= Idaho panhandle =

Region of the U.S. state of Idaho

Coordinates: 47°N 116°W

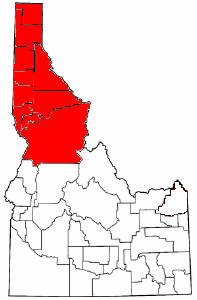
- Red: The ten counties of the Idaho panhandle
- Country: United States
- State: Idaho
- Largest city: Coeur d'Alene

Area
  - Total: 21,012.64 sq mi (54,422.5 km^{2})

Population (2020)
  - Total: 390,640

Historical population
| Census | Pop. | Note | %± |
|---|---|---|---|
| 1900 | 58,486 | | — |
| 1910 | 106,360 | | 81.9% |
| 1920 | 112,504 | | 5.8% |
| 1930 | 119,940 | | 6.6% |
| 1940 | 135,776 | | 13.2% |
| 1950 | 142,059 | | 4.6% |
| 1960 | 152,613 | | 7.4% |
| 1970 | 154,843 | | 1.5% |
| 1980 | 209,986 | | 35.6% |
| 1990 | 216,792 | | 3.2% |
| 2000 | 278,866 | | 28.6% |
| 2010 | 317,751 | | 13.9% |
| 2020 | 363,642 | | 14.4% |
| 2023 (est.) | 390,640 | | 7.4% |

The Idaho panhandle—locally known as North Idaho, Northern Idaho, or simply the Panhandle—is a salient region of the U.S. state of Idaho encompassing the state's 10 northernmost counties: Benewah, Bonner, Boundary, Clearwater, Idaho, Kootenai, Latah, Lewis, Nez Perce, and Shoshone (though the southern part of the region is sometimes referred to as North Central Idaho). The panhandle is bordered by the state of Washington to the west, Montana to the east, and the Canadian province of British Columbia to the north. The Idaho panhandle, along with Eastern Washington, makes up the region known as the Inland Northwest, headed by its largest city, Spokane, Washington.

Coeur d'Alene is the largest city within the Idaho panhandle. Spokane is around 30 miles (50 km) west of Coeur d'Alene, and its Spokane International Airport is the region's main air hub. Other important cities in the region include Lewiston, Moscow, Post Falls, Hayden, Sandpoint, and the smaller towns of St. Maries and Bonners Ferry. East of Coeur d'Alene is the Silver Valley, which follows Interstate 90 to the Montana border at Lookout Pass.

The region has a land area of 21,012.64 square miles (54,422 km^{2}), around 25.4% of the state's total land area; there is also 323.95 square miles (839 km^{2}) of water area. As of the 2020 Census, the population of the Idaho panhandle was 363,642, around 19.8% of the state's total population of 1,839,106.

The town of Bonners Ferry has two Canada–US border crossings: Porthill-Rykerts Border Crossing connects with Creston, British Columbia; Eastport–Kingsgate Border Crossing connects with Yahk, British Columbia.

== History ==
The eastern border of Idaho follows the Bitterroot Range, producing the narrow northern border.

== Politics ==
No resident of North Idaho has been elected governor since the re-election of Cecil Andrus (D) in 1974. An Oregon native raised in Eugene, Andrus had lived at Orofino and was a resident of Lewiston when first elected in 1970. (Boise was his residence during his later campaigns of 1986 and 1990). The most recent member of the U.S. Congress from the panhandle is Compton I. White Jr. (D) of Clark Fork, last elected 62 years ago in 1964.

North Idaho leans Republican, as does the state as a whole. Latah County, home of the University of Idaho in Moscow, is the only one of the region's 10 counties that does not. While Bonner County is also strongly Republican, the tourist town of Sandpoint located in the county is somewhat more centrist.

Recent presidential election results
| Year | Republican | Democratic | Third parties |
|---|---|---|---|
| 2024 | 72.3% 145,376 | 25.3% 50,821 | 2.5% 4,990 |
| 2020 | 68.0% 130,215 | 29.3% 56,221 | 2.7% 5,128 |
| 2016 | 64.0% 96,440 | 26.7% 40,261 | 9.3% 14,018 |
| 2012 | 61.6% 86,372 | 34.2% 47,910 | 4.2% 5,871 |
| 2008 | 59.0% 86,309 | 37.8% 55,301 | 3.2% 4,621 |
| 2004 | 63.3% 85,537 | 34.9% 47,132 | 1.8% 2,461 |
| 2000 | 64.1% 74,113 | 30.1% 34,777 | 5.9% 6,783 |
| 1996 | 43.7% 49,515 | 38.9% 43,976 | 17.4% 19,721 |
| 1992 | 33.2% 36,383 | 36.9% 40,478 | 29.9% 32,861 |
| 1988 | 50.9% 45,778 | 47.4% 42,573 | 1.7% 1,516 |

The panhandle has traditionally been one of the strongest areas for Democrats in statewide elections, largely because of its unionized miners and a smaller Mormon population than Southern Idaho. However, it largely changed in the 1980s with the drop in silver prices, slump of metal markets, mine closures and passage of a right-to-work law. Additionally, the influx of conservatives from Southern California beginning in the 1970s, many of whom were retired LAPD officers who chose to move to Coeur d'Alene, also shifted the politics of the region.

In the 1990 gubernatorial election, all counties were won by the incumbent Andrus, a popular moderate who easily won a fourth term. The Democratic nominee for Governor outperformed their statewide result in Northern Idaho in all elections from 1982 through 2006; Keith Allred received 30.9% in Northern Idaho vs. 32.9% statewide in 2010, A.J. Balukoff received 36.5% in Northern Idaho vs. 38.6% statewide in 2014, Paulette Jordan received 34.6% in Northern Idaho vs. 38.2% statewide in 2018, and Stephen Heidt received 16.8% in Northern Idaho vs. 20.3% statewide in 2022. Notably, anti-government activist Ammon Bundy came in second place with 20% of the vote in 2022.

Recent gubernatorial election results
| Year | Republican | Democratic | Third parties |
|---|---|---|---|
| 2022 | 61.5% 83,808 | 16.8% 22,852 | 21.8% 29,657 |
| 2018 | 63.6% 82,474 | 34.6% 44,914 | 1.8% 2,272 |
| 2014 | 54.1% 49,700 | 36.5% 33,517 | 9.4% 8,589 |
| 2010 | 62.1% 63,563 | 30.9% 31,600 | 7.0% 7,127 |
| 2006 | 50.1% 48,204 | 46.8% 45,065 | 3.1% 2,945 |
| 2002 | 53.8% 47,722 | 44.1% 39,120 | 2.2% 1,909 |
| 1998 | 64.0% 54,829 | 32.7% 28,064 | 3.3% 2,830 |
| 1994 | 48.0% 43,397 | 46.6% 42,189 | 5.4% 4,872 |
| 1990 | 29.7% 20,616 | 70.3% 48,880 | 0.0% 0 |
| 1986 | 36.1% 29,365 | 62.4% 50,764 | 1.6% 1,287 |
| 1982 | 42.4% 30,423 | 57.6% 41,412 | 0.0% 0 |

== Attractions ==
- Bird Aviation Museum and Invention Center
- Clearwater River
- Idaho Panhandle National Forest
- Kootenai River
- Lake Coeur d'Alene
- Lake Pend Oreille
- Lookout Pass Ski and Recreation Area
- North Idaho College
- Priest Lake
- Schweitzer Mountain
- Snake River
- Silver Mountain
- Silverwood Theme Park
- University of Idaho

== Geography and climate ==
The Idaho panhandle observes Pacific Time north of the western-flowing Salmon River in the southern part of Idaho County. The rest of the state to the south observes Mountain Time, which begins at Riggins. Though the Idaho panhandle is at the same longitude as southwestern Idaho, they have different time zones because (1) Spokane is the commercial and transportation center for the region, and (2) there are many cross-border towns and cities that are connected, including Spokane with Coeur d'Alene and Post Falls; Pullman (home of Washington State University) with Moscow (home of the University of Idaho); and Clarkston with Lewiston.

The panhandle is isolated from southern Idaho by distance and the east–west mountain ranges that divide the state. The passage by vehicle was arduous until significant highway improvements were made on U.S. Route 95 in North Central Idaho, specifically at Lapwai Canyon (1960), White Bird Hill (1975), the Lewiston grade (1977), and Lawyer's Canyon (1991).

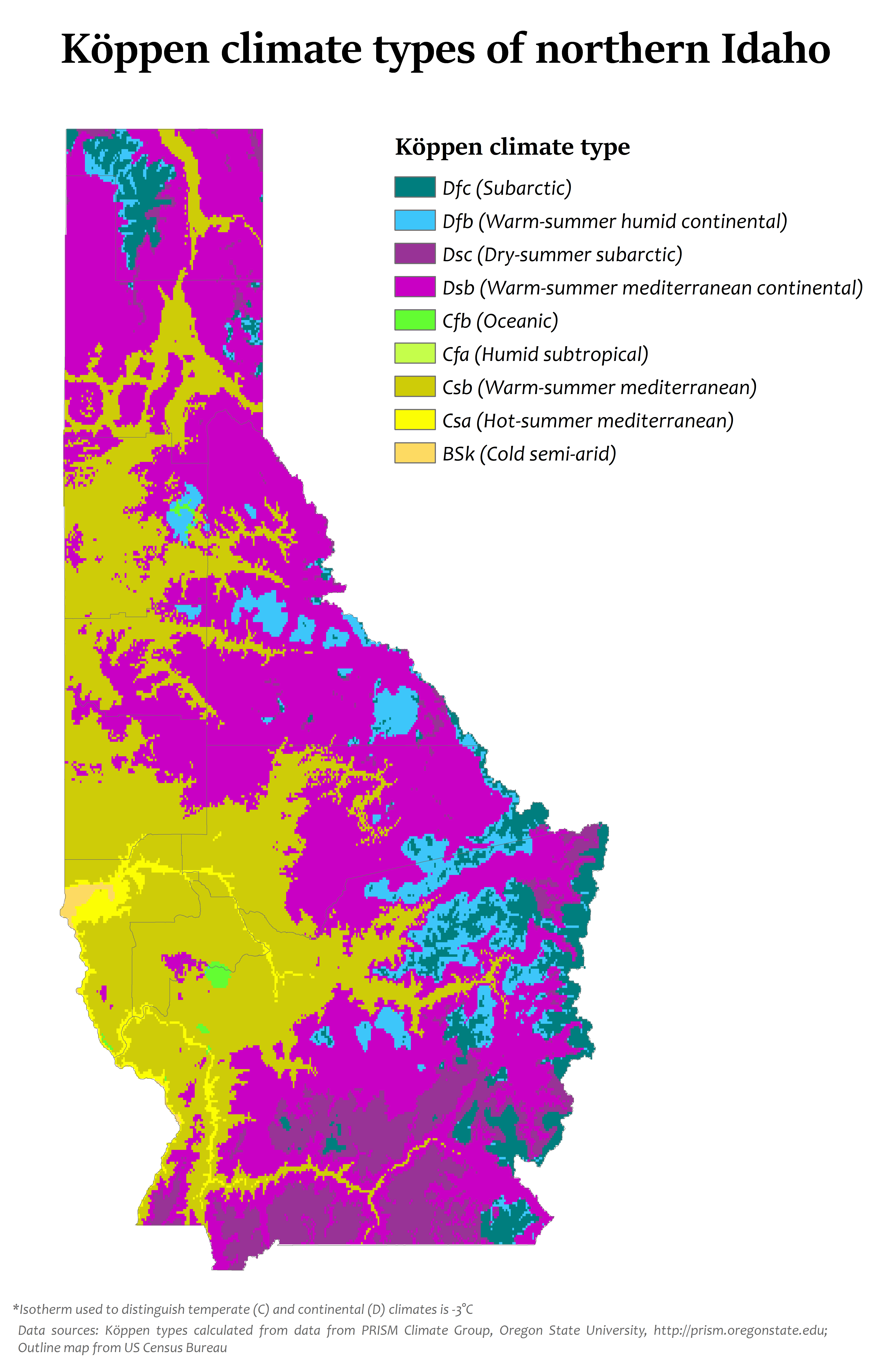
Köppen climate types in northern Idaho

== Regional agriculture ==
The North Idaho region is most noted for silviculture, the growing of trees and the production of lumber through the region's 12 lumber mills, supported by a range of modern harvesting and forest management practices. The production of grass seeds and hops for beer production are also significant in the region. Nine microbreweries have operations in the area, making North Idaho highly characteristic of the Pacific Northwest. There are also many cattle ranches.

Notable crops from the Palouse region include wheat, lentils, peas, and canola.

== Indian reservations ==
- Coeur d'Alene Indian Reservation
- Kootenai Indian Reservation
- Nez Perce Indian Reservation

== Major communities ==
- Bonners Ferry
- Coeur d'Alene
- Dalton Gardens
- Grangeville
- Hayden
- Kellogg
- Lewiston
- Lenore
- Moscow
- Orofino
- Post Falls
- Rathdrum
- Sandpoint
- St. Maries
- Spirit Lake
- Wallace
