= 2014 Idaho gubernatorial election =

- November 4, 2014
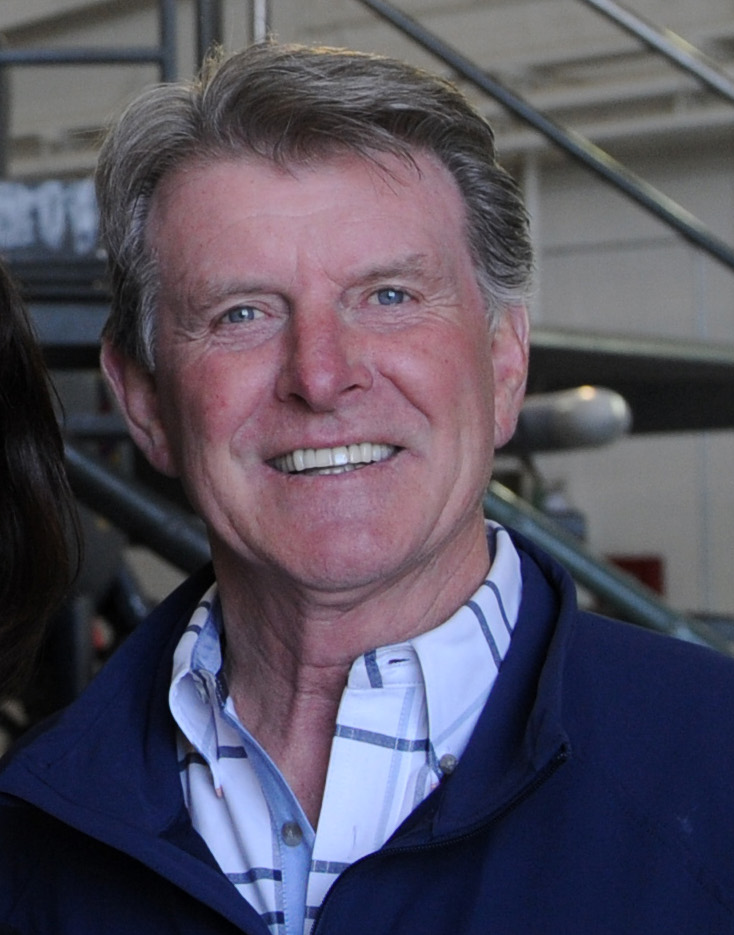

Nominee	Butch Otter	A.J. Balukoff
Party	Republican	Democratic
Popular vote	235,405	169,556
Percentage	53.52%	38.55%
- Otter: 40–50% 50–60% 60–70% 70–80% Balukoff: 40–50% 50–60% 60–70%
Governor before election
Butch Otter
Republican
Elected Governor
Butch Otter
Republican

The 2014 Idaho gubernatorial election was held on November 4, 2014, to elect the governor of Idaho, concurrently with the election to Idaho's Class II U.S. Senate seat, as well as other elections to the United States Senate in other states and elections to the United States House of Representatives and various state and local elections.

Incumbent Republican governor Butch Otter ran for election to a third consecutive term in office. In primary elections held on May 20, 2014, Otter was renominated and the Democrats nominated businessman and president of the Boise School District Board of Trustees A.J. Balukoff. Otter defeated Balukoff and four Independent and Third Party challengers in the general election.

== Republican primary ==
=== Candidates ===
==== Declared ====
- Walt Bayes, perennial candidate
- Harley Brown, candidate for Idaho's 1st congressional district in 2000 and 2010 and candidate for Mayor of Boise in 2001
- Russ Fulcher, state senator and future U.S. Representative from Idaho's 1st congressional district
- Butch Otter, incumbent governor

==== Declined ====
- Raúl Labrador, U.S. representative
- Brad Little, Lieutenant Governor of Idaho
- Tom Luna, Idaho Superintendent of Public Instruction
- Rex Rammell, activist, veterinarian and candidate for governor in 2010
- Lawrence Wasden, Attorney General of Idaho

=== Endorsements ===
Russ Fulcher
- Raúl Labrador, U.S. representative

=== Primary debate ===
2014 Idaho gubernatorial Republican primary debate
No.	Date	Host	Moderator	Link	Republican	Republican	Republican	Republican
Key: P Participant A Absent N Not invited I Invited W Withdrawn								
Key: P Participant A Absent N Not invited I Invited W Withdrawn					Butch Otter	Russ Fulcher	Harley Brown	Walt Bayes
1	May 13, 2014	IdahoPTV	Melissa Davlin	PBS	P	P	P	P

=== Results ===
Results by county: Otter: 40–50%; 50–60%; 60–70%; 70–80%; Fulcher: 40–50%; 50–60%; 60–70%; 70–80%

Republican primary results
Party	Candidate	Votes	%
Republican	Butch Otter (incumbent)	79,779	51.4
Republican	Russ Fulcher	67,694	43.6
Republican	Harley Brown	5,084	3.3
Republican	Walt Bayes	2,753	1.8
Total votes		155,310	100

== Democratic primary ==
=== Candidates ===
==== Declared ====
- A.J. Balukoff, businessman and president of the Boise School District Board of Trustees
- Terry Kerr, former Republican candidate for local office

==== Declined ====
- Keith G. Allred, activist, mediator and nominee for governor in 2010
- Cecil D. Andrus, former governor and former United States Secretary of the Interior
- David H. Bieter, Mayor of Boise

=== Endorsements ===
A.J. Balukoff
- Tommy Ahlquist, developer

=== Results ===
Results by county: Balukoff: 50–60%; 60–70%; 70–80%; Kerr: 50–60%; 60–70%

Democratic primary results
Party	Candidate	Votes	%
Democratic	A.J. Balukoff	16,751	65.3
Democratic	Terry Kerr	8,887	34.7
Total votes		25,638	100

== Constitution nomination ==
=== Nominated ===
- Steven Pankey, Republican candidate for lieutenant governor in 2010.

== Libertarian nomination ==
=== Nominated ===
- John Bujak, former Canyon County prosecutor

== Independents ==
=== Declared ===
- Jill Humble, retired nurse educator and candidate for Boise City Council in 2013
- Pro-Life (formerly known as Marvin Richardson), organic strawberry farmer, anti-abortion activist and perennial candidate

== General election ==
=== Debates ===
2014 Idaho gubernatorial election debates
No.	Date	Host	Moderator	Link	Republican	Democratic	Libertarian
Key: P Participant A Absent N Not invited I Invited W Withdrawn							
Key: P Participant A Absent N Not invited I Invited W Withdrawn					Butch Otter	A.J. Balukoff	John Bujak
1	September 24, 2014	Twin Falls Times-News	Autumn Phillips	C-SPAN	A	P	P
2	October 29, 2014	IdahoPTV	Melissa Davlin	PBS	P	P	P

=== Predictions ===
Source	Ranking	As of
The Cook Political Report	Solid R	November 3, 2014
Sabato's Crystal Ball	Likely R	November 3, 2014
Rothenberg Political Report	Likely R	November 3, 2014
Real Clear Politics	Likely R	November 3, 2014

=== Polling ===
Poll source	Date(s) administered	Sample size	Margin of error	Butch Otter (R)	A.J. Balukoff (D)	Other	Undecided
Public Policy Polling	October 30–November 2, 2014	1,001	± 3.1%	49%	37%	10%	5%
Public Policy Polling	October 30–November 2, 2014	1,001	± 3.1%	55%	42%	—	3%
CBS News/NYT/YouGov	October 16–23, 2014	575	± 6%	53%	35%	2%	10%
Public Policy Polling	October 9–12, 2014	522	± 4.3%	39%	35%	12%	14%
Public Policy Polling	October 9–12, 2014	522	± 4.3%	47%	38%	—	15%
CBS News/NYT/YouGov	September 20–October 1, 2014	594	± 5%	57%	33%	1%	9%
CBS News/NYT/YouGov	August 18–September 2, 2014	844	± 4%	51%	33%	3%	13%
CBS News/NYT/YouGov	July 5–24, 2014	691	± 4.2%	56%	34%	4%	7%
Rasmussen Reports	May 28–29, 2014	750	± 4%	50%	36%	8%	7%

=== Results ===
Idaho gubernatorial election, 2014
Party	Candidate	Votes	%	±%
Republican	Butch Otter (incumbent)	235,405	53.52%	−5.59%
Democratic	A.J. Balukoff	169,556	38.55%	+5.70%
Libertarian	John Bujak	17,884	4.07%	+2.77%
Independent	Jill Humble	8,801	2.00%	N/A
Constitution	Steven Pankey	5,219	1.19%	N/A
Independent	Pro-Life	2,870	0.65%	−0.20%
Write-in		95	0.02%	N/A
Total votes		439,830	100%	
Republican hold				

==== Counties that flipped from Republican to Democratic ====
- Ada (largest municipality: Boise)
- Bannock (largest municipality: Pocatello)

==== By congressional district ====
Otter won both congressional districts.

District	Otter	Balukoff	Representative
1st	57%	35%	Raúl Labrador
2nd	50%	42%	Mike Simpson
