= Keith Allred =

Keith Allred may refer to:

- Keith G. Allred (born 1964), 2010 Democratic nominee for Governor of Idaho
- Keith J. Allred (1955–2018), American lawyer in the United States Navy
