= 2010 Idaho gubernatorial election =

- November 2, 2010
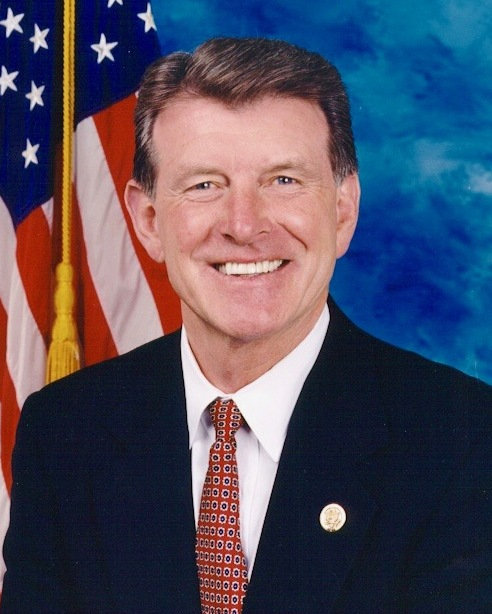

| Nominee | Butch Otter | Keith G. Allred | Jana Kemp |
| Party | Republican | Democratic | Independent |
| Popular vote | 267,483 | 148,680 | 26,655 |
| Percentage | 59.11% | 32.85% | 5.89% |
- County results Otter: 40–50% 50–60% 60–70% 70–80% Allred: 40–50% 50–60%
Governor before election
Butch Otter
Republican
Elected Governor
Butch Otter
Republican

The 2010 Idaho gubernatorial election was held on Tuesday, November 2, 2010, to elect the governor of Idaho. Incumbent Republican Governor Butch Otter won re-election, defeating his Democratic opponent Keith G. Allred.

A former lieutenant governor and U.S. representative, Otter won an open seat race in 2006 against Democratic Party nominee Jerry Brady with 52.67% of the vote.

== Republican primary ==
=== Candidates ===
- Walt Bayes, perennial candidate
- Fred Nichols
- Butch Otter, governor of Idaho
- Pete Peterson (endorsed independent candidate Jana Kemp, but still filed for the primary)
- Rex Rammell, veterinarian, conservative activist and independent candidate for the U.S. Senate in 2008
- Sharon Ullman, Ada County commissioner
- Tamara Wells

=== Campaign ===
Both Rammell and Ullman sought support from followers of the Tea Party movement by criticizing Otter's 2009 attempt to raise Idaho's gas tax.

In August 2009, Rammell drew criticism for joking about buying a license to hunt President Barack Obama.

=== Polling ===
| Poll source | Date(s) administered | Sample size | Margin of error | Walt Bayes | Butch Otter | Ron"Pete" Peterson | Rex Rammell | Sharon Ullman | Tamara Wells | Un- decided |
|---|---|---|---|---|---|---|---|---|---|---|
| Mason-Dixon (report) | May 17–19, 2010 | 625 | ± 4.0% | 1% | 60% | 3% | 6% | 4% | 1% | 25% |

=== Results ===
Results by county: Otter—70–80% Otter—60–70% Otter—50–60% Otter—40–50% Rammell—40–50% Rammell—50–60%

Republican primary results
| Party | Candidate | Votes | % |
|---|---|---|---|
| Republican | Butch Otter (incumbent) | 89,117 | 54.6 |
| Republican | Rex Rammell | 42,436 | 26.0 |
| Republican | Sharon Ullman | 13,749 | 8.4 |
| Republican | Pete Peterson | 8,402 | 5.2 |
| Republican | Walt Bayes | 4,825 | 3.0 |
| Republican | Tamara Wells | 4,544 | 2.8 |
| Republican | Fred Nichols | 38 | 0.0 |
| Total votes | | 163,111 | 100 |

== Democratic primary ==
=== Candidates ===
==== Declared ====
- Keith G. Allred, activist and mediator
- Lee Chaney, laborer

==== Declined ====
- Jerry Brady, nominee for governor in 2002 and 2006

=== Results ===
Results by county: Allred—80–90% Allred—70–80% Allred—60–70% Allred—50–60%

Democratic primary results
| Party | Candidate | Votes | % |
|---|---|---|---|
| Democratic | Keith Allred | 22,386 | 81.7 |
| Democratic | Lee Chaney | 5,026 | 18.3 |
| Total votes | | 27,412 | 100 |

== Third party candidates ==
=== Libertarian Party ===
- Ted Dunlap

=== Independents ===
- Jana Kemp, former Republican state representative
- Pro-Life (formerly known as Marvin Richardson), organic strawberry farmer, Constitution Party nominee for governor in 2006 and candidate for the U.S. Senate in 2008

== General election ==
=== Campaign ===
Between January 1 and May 9, 2010, Allred led Otter in fundraising, having raised $241,000 to Otter's $193,000. Allred said, "We are picking up momentum and are right where we want to be." However, Otter limited his fundraising activity while the Idaho Legislature was in session.

Allred criticized Otter for backing cuts to public education spending, which led the Idaho Association of Commerce and Industry to launch a website attacking Allred.

=== Predictions ===
| Source | Ranking | As of |
|---|---|---|
| Cook Political Report | Safe R | October 14, 2010 |
| Rothenberg | Safe R | October 28, 2010 |
| RealClearPolitics | Safe R | November 1, 2010 |
| Sabato's Crystal Ball | Likely R | October 28, 2010 |
| CQ Politics | Likely R | October 28, 2010 |

=== Polling ===
| Poll source | Dates administered | Butch Otter (R) | Keith Allred (D) |
|---|---|---|---|
| Rasmussen Reports | August 31, 2010 | 52% | 36% |
| Rasmussen Reports | July 15, 2010 | 53% | 36% |
| Rasmussen Reports | May 11, 2010 | 54% | 32% |
| Rasmussen Reports | March 23, 2010 | 60% | 28% |

=== Results ===
2010 Idaho gubernatorial election
| Party | Candidate | Votes | % | ±% |
|---|---|---|---|---|
| Republican | Butch Otter (incumbent) | 267,483 | 59.11% | +6.44% |
| Democratic | Keith G. Allred | 148,680 | 32.85% | −11.25% |
| Independent | Jana M. Kemp | 26,655 | 5.89% | |
| Libertarian | Ted Dunlap | 5,867 | 1.30% | −0.31% |
| Independent | Pro-Life | 3,850 | 0.85% | −0.77% |
| Majority | | 118,803 | 26.25% | +17.69% |
| Turnout | | 452,535 | | |
| Republican hold | | Swing | | |

==== Counties that flipped from Democratic to Republican ====
- Ada (largest municipality: Boise)
- Bannock (largest municipality: Pocatello)
- Nez Perce (largest city: Lewiston)
- Shoshone (largest city: Kellogg)
- Valley (largest city: McCall)
