= Pro-Life (politician) =

American perennial candidate and strawberry farmer

Personal details
- Born: Marvin Thomas Richardson; August 5, 1941 (age 85) Carbon County, Wyoming, U.S.
- Party: Constitution (2022–present; before 2006)
- Other political affiliations: Independent (2006–2022)
- Spouses: Jean Benson (m. 1964; div. 1982) Kirsten Faith (m. 1982)
- Children: 15
- Education: Brigham Young University (BA)
- Occupation: Organic farmer

Pro-Life (born Marvin Thomas Richardson; August 5, 1941) is an American perennial candidate and strawberry farmer known for his strong opposition to abortion, which inspired him to legally change his name. He lives in the unincorporated community of Letha, Idaho. He has made several unsuccessful runs for political office in Idaho and has stated his intention to continue running for office until his death. Pro-Life ran in the 2020 United States House of Representatives elections in Idaho, receiving 2.2% of the vote, and was most recently the Constitution Party nominee in the 2022 Idaho lieutenant gubernatorial election, receiving 5.1%.

== Early life and education ==
Born Marvin Thomas Richardson, Pro-Life was born in Carbon County, Wyoming, to a Latter Day Saint family. He played basketball in high school and attended Brigham Young University on an athletic scholarship but was eventually cut from the varsity basketball team. He graduated from BYU in 1967 with a degree in political science after serving as an LDS missionary in Arizona, California, and Nevada.

Pro-Life has worked as an organic farmer since 2002, mainly farming strawberries. He has previously worked as an accountant, coal miner, and salesman of irrigation equipment and Caterpillar parts.

== Career ==
=== Campaigns ===
As Marvin Richardson, Pro-Life first ran for public office in 2004 when he challenged Republican Kathy Skippen for a seat in the Idaho House of Representatives. Skippen won 78% to 22%.

Having legally changed his middle name to "Pro-Life" in 2004, Richardson filed for the 2006 Idaho governor's race as Marvin Pro-Life Richardson. The Idaho Secretary of State's office would not allow Richardson to appear on the ballot with his new middle name, although he could be listed as Marvin P. Richardson. Secretary of State Ben Ysursa said, "We've made it clear to him since March we were not going to put 'pro-life' on the ballot, and that's still our position. The ballot is not supposed to be a forum for political expression—it's supposed to be as neutral as it can be." Richardson was invited to participate in the 2006 gubernatorial debate, but did not respond to his invitation in time. Initially, Richardson was the Constitution Party's candidate in the 2006 gubernatorial election, but the Constitution Party of Idaho disavowed him. That year, he had his name changed to simply "Pro-Life," but still appeared as Marvin Richardson on the ballot. In the election, he received 1.62 percent of the vote, behind Democrat Jerry Brady and the winner, Republican Butch Otter.

In 2008, Pro-Life ran as an independent for the United States Senate seat being vacated by Larry Craig. That year, he was allowed to appear on the ballot as "Pro-Life." The executive director of an Idaho anti-abortion group expressed concern that voters would mistake Pro-Life's name on the ballot for a position rather than a candidate. Such fears led to a qualifier next to Pro-Life's name on the ballot: "(A person, formerly known as Marvin Richardson)." He has appeared thus on all subsequent Idaho ballots. He received 1.34 percent of the votes in the race, behind Libertarian Kent Marmon, independent Rex Rammell, Democrat Larry LaRocco, and the winner, Republican Jim Risch.

In 2010, Pro-Life ran for governor for a second time. He came in fifth in the race, behind Libertarian Ted Dunlap, independent Jana Kemp, Democrat Keith Allred, and the winner, Republican Butch Otter.

Pro-Life was a candidate for Idaho's 1st congressional district in the United States Congress in 2012. He ran against incumbent Republican Raúl Labrador and Democrat Jimmy Farris. According to OpenSecrets, Pro-Life's 2012 campaign was entirely self-financed. The incumbent won the race.

Pro-Life ran a third campaign for Governor of Idaho in the 2014 gubernatorial election.

Pro-Life ran for the Senate again in 2016. He was defeated in the Constitution Party primary on May 17, 2016 by Ray J. Writz.

=== Political views ===
Pro-Life has said he believes that abortion is murder, and he supports charging doctors who perform abortions with murder.

He opposed the Troubled Asset Relief Program as a candidate in 2008, citing concerns that its implementation would result in "a total fascist dictatorship run by the bankers." He opposes war undertaken without a declaration of war by Congress; he supports a non-interventionist foreign policy and considers the wars in Iraq, Afghanistan, and Libya to be unjust and unconstitutional. He also opposes public education, which he considers to be communist. After the Sandy Hook Elementary School shooting, he suggested allowing Idaho sheriffs to organize groups of armed volunteers to protect schools.

== Personal life ==
Pro-Life is a vegetarian. As Marvin Richardson, he married Jean Benson in 1964; they divorced in 1982.

He has been married to Kirsten Faith since 1982. In 2006, she ran for the Idaho House of Representatives as the Constitution Party nominee against Republican Steven Thayn, receiving 3,026 votes (24.56%). Pro-Life encouraged her to run for this position, despite their conviction that women should not work outside the home.

Pro-Life has 15 children, seven from his previous wife, and eight from his current wife.

Formerly a member of the Church of Jesus Christ of Latter-day Saints, Pro-Life left the church in 1998, because of his view that the church does not ascribe personhood to the unborn.

== Electoral history ==
=== Idaho House of Representatives (2004) ===
2004 Idaho House of Representatives 11th district general election
Party	Candidate	Votes	%
Republican	Kathy Skippen	11,216	77.86%
Constitution	Marvin T. Richardson (Note: While he changed his middle name to Pro-Life in 2004, his name on the ballot did not reflect this.)	3,189	22.14%
Total votes		14,405	100.00%

=== Idaho gubernatorial elections (2006, 2010, 2014) ===
2006 Idaho gubernatorial election
Party	Candidate	Votes	%
Republican	Butch Otter	237,437	52.67%
Democratic	Jerry Brady	198,845	44.11%
Constitution	Marvin Richardson (Note: While he changed his full name to Pro-Life in 2006, Secretary of State Ben Ysursa would not allow him to appear on the ballot under that name due to neutrality concerns.)	7,309	1.62%
Libertarian	Ted Dunlap	7,241	1.61%
Total votes		450,832	100.00%

2010 Idaho gubernatorial election
Party	Candidate	Votes	%
Republican	Butch Otter (incumbent)	267,483	59.11%
Democratic	Keith Allred	148,680	32.85%
Independent	Jana M. Kemp	26,655	5.89%
Libertarian	Ted Dunlap	5,867	1.30%
Independent	Pro-Life	3,850	0.85%
Total votes		452,535	100.00%

2014 Idaho gubernatorial election
Party	Candidate	Votes	%
Republican	Butch Otter (incumbent)	235,405	53.53%
Democratic	A.J. Balukoff	169,556	38.56%
Libertarian	John Bujak	17,884	4.07%
Independent	Jill Humble	8,801	2.00%
Constitution	Steve Pankey	5,219	1.19%
Independent	Pro-Life	2,870	0.65%
Total votes		439,735	100.00%

=== U.S. Senate (2008) ===
2008 United States Senate election in Idaho
Party	Candidate	Votes	%
Republican	Jim Risch	371,744	57.65%
Democratic	Larry LaRocco	219,903	34.11%
Independent	Rex Rammell	34,510	5.35%
Libertarian	Kent A. Marmon	9,958	1.54%
Independent	Pro-Life	8,662	1.34%
Total votes		644,777	100.00%

=== U.S. House of Representatives (2012, 2020) ===
2012 Idaho's 1st congressional district election
Party	Candidate	Votes	%
Republican	Raúl Labrador	199,489	62.97%
Democratic	Jimmy Farris	97,436	30.76%
Libertarian	Rob Oates	12,264	3.87%
Independent	Pro-Life	7,605	2.40%
Total votes		316,794	100.00%

2020 Idaho's 2nd congressional district election
Party	Candidate	Votes	%
Republican	Mike Simpson	250,678	64.06%
Democratic	Aaron Swisher	124,151	31.72%
Constitution	Pro-Life	8,573	2.19%
Libertarian	Rob Oates	7,940	2.03%
Total votes		391,342	100.00%

=== Idaho lieutenant gubernatorial election (2022) ===
Idaho lieutenant gubernatorial election, 2022
Party	Candidate	Votes	%
Republican	Scott Bedke	376,269	64.38%
Democratic	Terri Pickens Manweiler	178,147	30.48%
Constitution	Pro-Life	29,989	5.13%
Total votes		584,405	100%
Republican hold			

== See also ==
- Seán Dublin Bay Rockall Loftus—an Irish politician who changed his name to reflect his political views
