= Butch Otter =

American politician (born 1942)

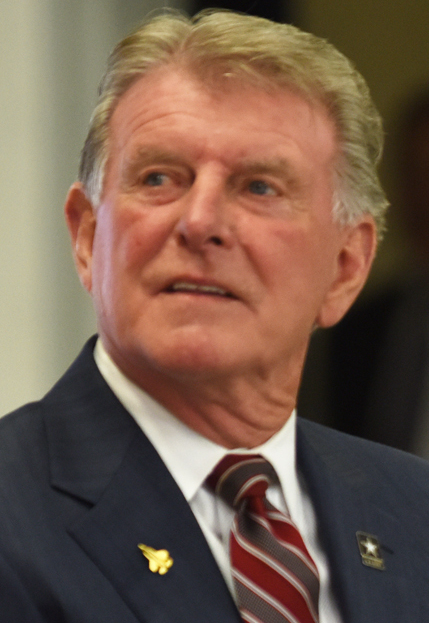
- Otter in 2017

32nd Governor of Idaho
- In office January 1, 2007 – January 7, 2019
- Lieutenant: Jim Risch; Brad Little
- Preceded by: Jim Risch
- Succeeded by: Brad Little

Member of the U.S. House of Representatives from Idaho's 1st district
- In office January 3, 2001 – January 1, 2007
- Preceded by: Helen Chenoweth-Hage
- Succeeded by: Bill Sali

37th Lieutenant Governor of Idaho
- In office January 5, 1987 – January 3, 2001
- Governor: Cecil Andrus; Phil Batt; Dirk Kempthorne
- Preceded by: David Leroy
- Succeeded by: Jack Riggs

Member of the Idaho House of Representatives
- In office December 1, 1972 – December 1, 1976

Personal details
- Born: Clement Leroy Otter; May 3, 1942 (age 84) Caldwell, Idaho, U.S.
- Party: Republican
- Spouses: Gay Simplot (m. 1964; div. 1992); Lori Easley (m. 2006)
- Children: 4
- Education: Saint Martin's University (attended); Boise State University (attended); College of Idaho (BA)

Military service
- Branch/service: United States Army
- Years of service: 1968–1973
- Unit: Idaho Army National Guard

Clement Leroy "Butch" Otter (born May 3, 1942) is an American businessman and politician who served as the 32nd governor of Idaho from 2007 to 2019. A member of the Republican Party, he was elected in 2006, and re-elected in 2010 and 2014. Otter served as lieutenant governor from 1987 to 2001 and in Congress from 2001 to 2007.

Otter is Idaho’s second longest serving governor, ahead of Robert E. Smylie, but behind Cecil Andrus.

== Early life, education and business career (1942–1972) ==
Born in Caldwell, Idaho, into a small Roman Catholic family of limited means, his parents were Regina Mary (née Buser) and Joseph Bernard Otter. His father was a journeyman electrician, and the family lived in many rural locations in the Midwest and West during his youth, attending fifteen different schools.

His nickname "Butch" was the result of a few schoolyard fights which resulted in minor bruises; Catholic nuns had initially nicknamed him "Clem" after a character in the Red Skelton Show. He graduated from St. Teresa's Academy (predecessor of Bishop Kelly High School) in Boise in 1962. Otter graduated from high school at age twenty – a childhood accident involving gasoline severely burned his younger brother and forced Otter to take a year off. He worked throughout high school as a janitor, theater usher, and lawn boy.

Otter briefly attended St. Martin's College in Lacey, Washington, returned to Idaho and attended Boise Junior College, then earned his B.A. in political science from the College of Idaho in 1967. He was the only member of his family to graduate from college, and made the dean's list in his last term.

Otter's business experience includes thirty years with Simplot International, an agribusiness corporation founded by his then father-in-law, J.R. Simplot. He started at a low-level position and eventually was appointed to the company's presidency.

== Early political career (1972–1986) ==
=== Idaho legislature ===
His first bid for elective office was in 1972; he won a seat in the state legislature from Canyon County, and was re-elected to the House in 1974 serving until 1976.

=== 1978 gubernatorial election ===
In January 1977, incumbent Democratic Governor Cecil Andrus was appointed U.S. Secretary of Interior under President Jimmy Carter. Lieutenant governor John Evans, a Democrat, succeeded Andrus and Otter announced in June his intention to run for governor in 1978. In the six-man Republican primary in August, Otter ranked a close third with 26.0% of the vote. Allan Larsen, the House Speaker from Blackfoot, won the nomination with 28.7% of the vote, followed by Vern Ravenscroft of Tuttle, with 27.6%.

The nominees of both parties were Mormon, marking the first time in state history one would be elected governor. Incumbent Evans was unopposed in the Democratic primary and won the general election in November with nearly sixty percent of the vote; it was the third of six consecutive victories by Democrats.

=== State politics ===
After losing the gubernatorial primary, he was on the Idaho Republican Party Central Committee and was Chairman of the Canyon County Republican Party.

=== Reagan administration ===
After Ronald Reagan won the presidency in 1980, he appointed Otter to the administration's Task Force on International Private Enterprise, the World Bank's Agricultural Advisory Committee, and the Center for International Private Enterprise.

== Lieutenant governor (1987–2001) ==
In 1986, Otter returned to Idaho politics and was elected lieutenant governor, and reelected in 1990, 1994, and 1998. He served under three different governors, Democrat Cecil Andrus, and Republicans Phil Batt and Dirk Kempthorne. In 1991, when the Idaho Senate was evenly divided between 21 Republicans and 21 Democrats, Otter's tie-breaking votes kept the body under GOP control. Midway through his fourth term in 2001 (14 years), Otter resigned to take his congressional seat in Washington, D.C.; he is the longest-serving lieutenant governor in Idaho history.

== U.S. House of Representatives (2001–2007) ==
=== Elections ===
Otter entered the Republican primary, and immediately became the favorite due to his name recognition as lieutenant governor. He won handily, and breezed to victory in November, and was re-elected in 2002 and 2004.

=== Tenure ===
In Congress, Otter was largely conservative with a slight libertarian streak, as reflected in his opposition to the Patriot Act. He was one of three Republicans (along with Bob Ney of Ohio and Ron Paul of Texas) to vote against the Act in 2001.

He since stated that "much of the USA PATRIOT Act is needed to help protect us in a dangerous age of stateless zealots and mindless violence". Otter was also very critical of the Bush Administration's Terrorist Surveillance Program concerning communications to those outside the United States.

==== LGBT rights ====
He supports a constitutional amendment defining marriage as between "one man and one woman."

==== Gun laws ====
He has been a strong advocate for Second Amendment rights and opposes federal restrictions on gun sales.

==== Economy ====
On economic issues, he has voted for a 2001 bankruptcy overhaul requiring partial debt repayment. He supports a balanced budget amendment to the US Constitution and supports broad-based tax cuts including eliminating the estate and marriage taxes.

==== Foreign policy ====
Otter voted to authorize the 2003 invasion of Iraq.

=== Committee assignments ===
- U.S. House Committee on Resources
- U.S. House Committee on Transportation and Infrastructure
- U.S. House Committee on Government Reform
- U.S. House Committee on Energy and Commerce

== Governor of Idaho (2007–2019) ==
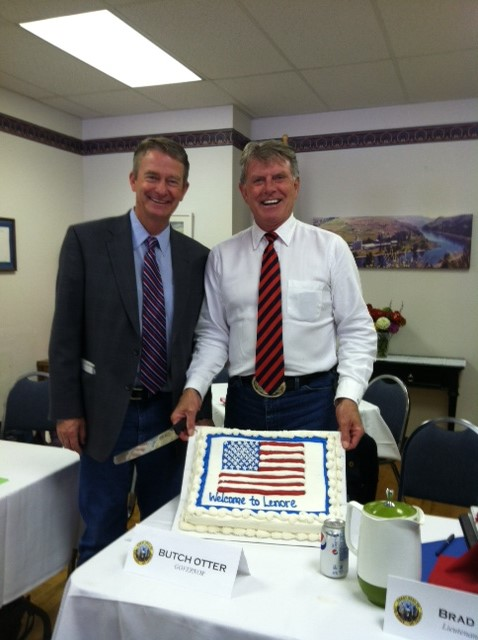
Otter with then-lieutenant governor Brad Little in September 2014.

=== 2006 election ===
In December 2005, Otter announced his candidacy for the gubernatorial seat in 2006. Otter won the May Republican primary with 70% of the vote, defeating three opponents

In the general election, he faced Democrat Jerry Brady in the November 7 general election. Brady, the former publisher of The Post Register in Idaho Falls, had run for governor in 2002, losing to incumbent Republican Governor Dirk Kempthorne. Otter was initially considered an overwhelming favorite, given his popularity and Idaho's strong Republican lean. However, the race was far closer than expected in the last weeks of the campaign. A poll conducted for the Idaho Statesman and Boise ABC affiliate KIVI showed Otter ahead of Brady by only a single point– a statistical dead heat. According to the Statesman, it was the first time in over a decade that the governor's race has not already been decided 10 days prior to the election.

State Republican Party chairman Kirk Sullivan told the paper that the race appeared to be closer than normal because of a strong national trend against the Republicans. Otter pulled away in the final week, and won the election 53%–44%, the closest gubernatorial race since 1994.

=== First term ===
Otter has recommended an increase in Idaho state educational funding by $1.36 billion as well as expanding needs-based scholarships for college-bound students. Otter supports expanding offshore oil drilling and supports tax incentives for development of alternative fuels. He has stated that the US should set a goal of 25% renewable energy by 2025.

On January 11, 2007, Otter announced his support for a "gray wolf kill," in which all but 100 of Idaho's recently recovered population would be eradicated, pending the forthcoming U.S. Fish and Wildlife Service removal of the wolves' federal protections under the Endangered Species Act. Otter even remarked that he would be first in line to purchase a tag to kill one of the animals. This position drew criticism from many Western environmental and animal advocate groups, including Priscilla Feral, president of Friends of Animals who called for a boycott of potatoes from Idaho.

In the summer of 2007, actress Dawn Wells, the original Mary Ann from Gilligan's Island, presented Governor Butch Otter with the Idaho Visionary Award for work he had done supporting Idaho filmmakers at the SpudFest Family Film and Music Festival that she founded in Driggs, Idaho.

=== 2010 election ===
In the Republican primary, he had five opponents file against him. He won re-nomination with just 55% of the vote. In the general election, he defeated Democratic nominee Keith Allred 59%–33%.

=== Second term ===
He was sworn into his second term on January 7, 2011. In the first State of the State in his second term, he proposed the elimination of teacher tenure, becoming one of the most aggressive governors in the country when it comes to education reform. The Stateline explained that the "Idaho plan is perhaps the most far-reaching effort to use teachers' rights and performance as part of a bid to revamp a state's entire educational process." Critics say that roughly 770 teaching positions would be eliminated and teacher contracts would have to be renegotiated every year, in which bargaining would cover only pay and benefits. In March 2011, Otter signed two bills into law, one limits the ability of teachers to collectively bargain and eliminates tenure for new teachers. The other allows school districts to pay teachers based on their performance. The "Luna laws" (named after the state's superintendent of education) were later overturned in three state referendums in 2012.

In April 2011, Otter issued an executive order prohibiting Idaho state agencies from implementing the federal Patient Protection and Affordable Care Act.

In 2013, the Corrections Corporation of America (CCA) confirmed that an internal review showed the corporation had falsified records involving about 4,800 employee hours over a period of seven months, at its Idaho State Correctional Center. In 2014, a subsequent KPMG audit showed the actual overbilling was for over 26,000 hours. Otter ordered Idaho State Police to investigate to see if criminal charges should be brought. Otter had received a total of $20,000 in campaign contributions from employees of the company since 2003. In March, the state announced that the FBI was taking over the investigation, as well as investigating CCA operations in other states. In January 2014, Otter announced that the state would take back the operations of the prison.

In May 2016, CCA, which had by then changed its name to CoreCivic, was found in contempt of court for having failed to comply with a court order regarding the Idaho State Correctional Institution. In an apparent attempt to increase profits, the company had been assigning too few staff to the prison and it submitted false staffing reports in order to appear to be in compliance.

In March 2014 Otter established the "Wolf Control Fund and State Board" which continues his policy of exterminating wolves in Idaho.

=== 2014 election ===
In November 2014, Otter was elected to a third consecutive term as governor.

=== Third term ===
Senate Bill 1146a, which would have legalized CBD oil for persons with severe epilepsy, passed the Idaho Legislature following "lengthy and emotional" hearings, but was vetoed by Otter in April 2015.

In his veto, Otter stated:

It ignores ongoing scientific testing on alternative treatments ... It asks us to trust but not to verify. It asks us to legalize the limited use of cannabidiol oil, contrary to federal law. And it asks us to look past the potential for misuse and abuse with criminal intent.

For the United States presidential election in 2016 Otter endorsed fellow Republican John Kasich.

In May 2016, CCA, which had changed its name to CoreCivic, was found in contempt of court for having failed to comply with a court order regarding the Idaho State Correctional Institution. In an apparent attempt to increase profits, the company had been assigning too few staff to the prison. They submitted false staffing reports to appear to be in compliance.

In July 2017, Texas Attorney General Ken Paxton led a group of Republican Attorneys General from nine other states, and also including Otter, in threatening the Donald Trump administration that they would litigate if the president did not terminate the Deferred Action for Childhood Arrivals policy that had been put into place by president Barack Obama.

On January 5, 2019, the State Central Committee of the Idaho Republican Party passed a resolution condemning and censuring Otter ultimately over endorsing an independent candidate over a candidate nominated in the previous May primary. In 2019, Otter endorsed, John McGee, in the Caldwell City Council Seat 6 election.

== Personal life ==
Butch and Lori Otter opening the 2009 Special Olympics World Winter Games

In 1964, Otter married Gay Simplot (b. 1945), the sister of Scott Simplot and only daughter of J. R. Simplot. After 28 years of marriage, the couple amicably divorced in 1992. The marriage was later annulled by the Catholic Church.

In 2006, Otter married his longtime girlfriend Lori Easley (born 1967), a former Miss Idaho USA, in Meridian on August 18.

=== Drunk driving arrest ===
In August 1992, Otter was pulled over on Interstate 84 near Meridian for suspicion of driving under the influence. He said the arresting officer observed him swerving as he was reaching for his cowboy hat, which had been blown off by the wind in his open car. Otter offered several explanations for failing the field sobriety test including: his stocking feet were stung by weeds and gravel, he had run eight miles (13 km) and his knee hurt, he was hungry, and that he had soaked his chewing tobacco in Jack Daniel's. A jury convicted Otter in March 1993, and he was sentenced to 72 hours of community service and 16 hours at an alcohol treatment program, fined $700, and had his license revoked.

He publicly admitted the incident could have ended his political career; it likely forced him to abandon an anticipated run for governor in 1994 and instead seek re-election for lieutenant governor. Phil Batt won the gubernatorial election for the first Republican victory in 28 years.

== Electoral history ==
Idaho Lieutenant Governor: Results 1986–1998
Year	Democratic	Votespe	Pct	Republican	Votes	Pct	3rd Party	Party	Votes	Pct
1986	Marjorie Ruth Moon			Butch Otter						
1990	(unopposed)			Butch Otter (inc.)	246,132	100%				
1994	John Peavey	191,625	47.4%	Butch Otter (inc.)	213,009	52.6%				
1998	Sue Reents	133,688	35.6%	Butch Otter (inc.)	225,704	60.2%	Alan Stroud	American Heritage	15,769	4.2%

Idaho Lieutenant Governor Republican primary election, 1990
Party	Candidate	Votes	%
Republican	Butch Otter (inc.)	73,292	69.6%
Republican	Robert Forrey	31,963	30.4%

Idaho Lieutenant Governor Republican primary election, 1994
Party	Candidate	Votes	%
Republican	Butch Otter (inc.)	46,805	39.7%
Republican	Dean Sorenson	38,963	33.1%
Republican	Dean Haagenson	32,037	27.2%

Idaho's 1st congressional district: Results 2000–2004
Year	Democratic	Votes	Pct	Republican	Votes	Pct	3rd Party	Party	Votes	Pct	3rd Party	Party	Votes	Pct
2000	Linda Pall	84,080	31.4%	Butch Otter	173,743	64.8%	Ronald G. Wittig	Libertarian	6,093	2.3%	Kevin P. Hambsch	Reform	4,200	1.6%
2002	Betty Richardson	80,269	38.9%	Butch Otter (inc.)	120,743	58.6%	Steve Gothard	Libertarian	5,129	2.5%				
2004	Naomi Preston	90,927	30.5%	Butch Otter (inc.)	207,662	69.5%								

Idaho's 1st Congressional district Republican primary election, 2000
Party	Candidate	Votes	%
Republican	Butch Otter	41,516	47.6%
Republican	Dennis Mansfield	23,559	27.0%
Republican	Ron McMurray	14,434	16.6%
Republican	Craig Benjamin	2,966	3.4%
Republican	"Big Jim" Pratt	1,281	1.5%
Republican	Gene Summa	1,240	1.4%
Republican	David Shepherd	1,181	1.4%
Republican	Harley Brown	983	1.1%

Idaho's 1st Congressional district Republican primary election, 2004
Party	Candidate	Votes	%
Republican	Butch Otter (inc.)	48,986	78.5%
Republican	Jim Pratt	13,433	21.5%

Idaho Governor: Results 2006–2014
Year	Democratic	Votes	Pct	Republican	Votes	Pct	3rd Party	Party	Votes	Pct	3rd Party	Party	Votes	Pct
2006	Jerry Brady	198,845	44.1%	Butch Otter	237,437	52.7%	Pro-Life (politician)	Constitution	7,309	1.6%	Steve Gothard	Libertarian	7,241	1.6%
2010	Keith G. Allred	148,680	32.9%	Butch Otter (inc.)	267,483	59.1%	Jana Kemp	Independent	26,655	5.9%	Ted Dunlap	Libertarian	5,867	1.3%
2014	A.J. Balukoff	169,556	38.6%	Butch Otter (inc.)	235,405	53.5%	John Bujak	Libertarian	17,884	4.1%	Jill Humble	Independent	8,801	2.0%

Idaho Gubernatorial Republican primary election, 2006
Party	Candidate	Votes	%
Republican	Butch Otter	96,045	70.0%
Republican	Dan Adamson	29,093	21.2%
Republican	Jack Alan Johnson	7,652	5.6%
Republican	Walt Bayes	4,385	3.2%

Idaho Gubernatorial Republican primary election, 2010
Party	Candidate	Votes	%
Republican	Butch Otter (inc.)	89,117	54.6%
Republican	Rex Rammell	42,436	26.0%
Republican	Sharon M. Ullman	13,749	8.4%
Republican	Ron "Pete" Peterson	8,402	5.2%
Republican	Walt Bayes	4,825	3.0%
Republican	Tamara Wells	4,544	2.8%
Republican	Fred Nichols (write-in)	38	0.0%

Idaho Gubernatorial Republican primary election, 2014
Party	Candidate	Votes	%
Republican	Butch Otter (inc.)	79,779	51.4%
Republican	Russ Fulcher	67,694	43.6%
Republican	Harley Brown	5,084	3.3%
Republican	Walt Bayes	2,753	1.8%

Political offices
Preceded by David Leroy	Lieutenant Governor of Idaho; 1987–2001	Succeeded by Jack Riggs
Preceded by Jim Risch	Governor of Idaho; 2007–2019	Succeeded by Brad Little
U.S. House of Representatives
Preceded by Helen Chenoweth-Hage	Member of the U.S. House of Representatives from Idaho's 1st congressional district 2001–2007	Succeeded by Bill Sali
Party political offices
Preceded by Dirk Kempthorne	Republican nominee for Governor of Idaho; 2006, 2010, 2014	Succeeded by Brad Little
U.S. order of precedence (ceremonial)
Preceded by Martha McSally as Former U.S. Senator	Order of precedence of the United States; Within Idaho	Succeeded by Jack Markell as Former Governor
Preceded by Jay Inslee as Former Governor	Order of precedence of the United States; Outside Idaho	Succeeded by Mike Sullivan as Former Governor
