= List of people from San Bernardino, California =

The following is a list of notable people from San Bernardino, California.

== Arts ==
- Jerome Bixby – writer
- Gene Hackman – actor and novelist
- Kirk Harris – actor, writer
- Edith Head – costume designer
- Poison Ivy – producer and guitarist for the Cramps
- Brenden Jefferson – actor
- Roscoe Karns (1891–1970) – actor
- David Lauser – drummer
- Julie London – singer, actress
- Michael Reaves – screenwriter
- Fuerza Regida – music group
- Bob Spalding – guitarist/bassist for The Ventures, born in San Bernardino
- Lakeith Stanfield – actor
- Moses Sumney – singer-songwriter
- Twyla Tharp – choreographer and dancer
- Philip Michael Thomas – actor
- Jason Thornberry – writer, musician
- Miranda Weese – dancer
- Jefferson Wood – illustrator
- Shailene Woodley – actress

== Journalism ==
- Wilbur H. Durborough (1882-1946) – photojournalist and film correspondent in World War I
- Ron Magers – reporter and news anchor at WLS-TV in Chicago

== Politics ==
- Anna Escobedo Cabral – 42nd treasurer of the United States
- Stephen W. Cunningham – first UCLA graduate manager and Los Angeles City Council member, 1933–41
- Merritt B. Curtis – brigadier general in the Marine Corps and candidate for president of the United States in 1960
- Dirk Kempthorne – Idaho governor, U.S. senator, U.S. Secretary of the Interior; moved to San Bernardino at a young age, lived there through junior college
- Claude R. Kirk, Jr. – governor of Florida

== Science ==
- Michael R. Clifford – astronaut
- Howard Georgi – professor of physics at Harvard University

== Sports ==
- Tyler Ankrum – NASCAR driver
- Branden Becker – baseball player
- Glenn Braggs – baseball player
- Greg Bunch – basketball player
- Brandie Burton – golfer
- Chuck Carr – baseball player
- Layshia Clarendon – basketball player
- Kenny Clark – football player
- Mark Collins – football player
- Jayden Daniels – football player
- Rich Dauer – baseball player
- Shawn Estes – baseball player
- King Green – mixed martial artist
- Charles Johnson – football player
- Al Jury – football referee
- Damontae Kazee – football player
- Bob Lemon – baseball player and manager
- Paul Lim – darts player
- Alberto Madril – wrestler
- Alexander Mattison – football player
- Jason Moore – football player
- Ryan Nece – football player
- Craig Newsome – football player
- Derek Parra – Olympic speed skater
- Stephanie Rehe – tennis player
- Ricky Romero – wrestler
- Bryon Russell – basketball player
- Swede Savage – race car driver
- Daryl Sconiers – baseball player
- Judy Shapiro-Ikenberry (born 1942) – long distance runner
- Jeremy Stevenson – hockey player
- Dave Stockton – golfer
- Jalin Turner – mixed martial artist
- Lisa Marie Varon – wrestler
- Charlie Venegas – speedway rider

== Other ==
- Anthony Acevedo (1924–2018) – Mexican-American engineer and U.S. soldier incarcerated at the Berga concentration camp during World War II
- John Brown (1817–1889) – mountain man, fur trapper and trader, prominent businessman in San Bernardino
- Richard and Maurice McDonald – founders of McDonald's
- Rizwan Farook – terrorist
- Walter Knott (1889–1981) – founder of Knott's Berry Farm
- Anna Nieto-Gómez – Chicana feminist
- Fredrick D. Scott – business consultant
