= Bird Aviation Museum and Invention Center =

Aircraft museum, Idaho

Coordinates: 47.768974°N 116.822275°W

Bird Aviation Museum and Invention Center is an aircraft museum. It was founded by Dr. Forrest Bird and is located in Hayden, Idaho at 2678 W Cessna Ave, in the Idaho Panhandle. The museum features a rotating number of approximately 20 aircraft dating from pre-World War I to the present.

== Inventions ==
Also housed in the facilities are exhibits of inventions. These include a Bird Respirator and a variety of inventions ranging from the Barbie doll by Ruth Handler to the Apple II primarily by Steve Wozniak.

The museum attracts visitors from around the world. It offers learning programs for students and children.

== See also ==
- Aviation in World War I
- Antique aircraft
- List of aerospace museums
