= Larry LaRocco =

American politician (born 1946)

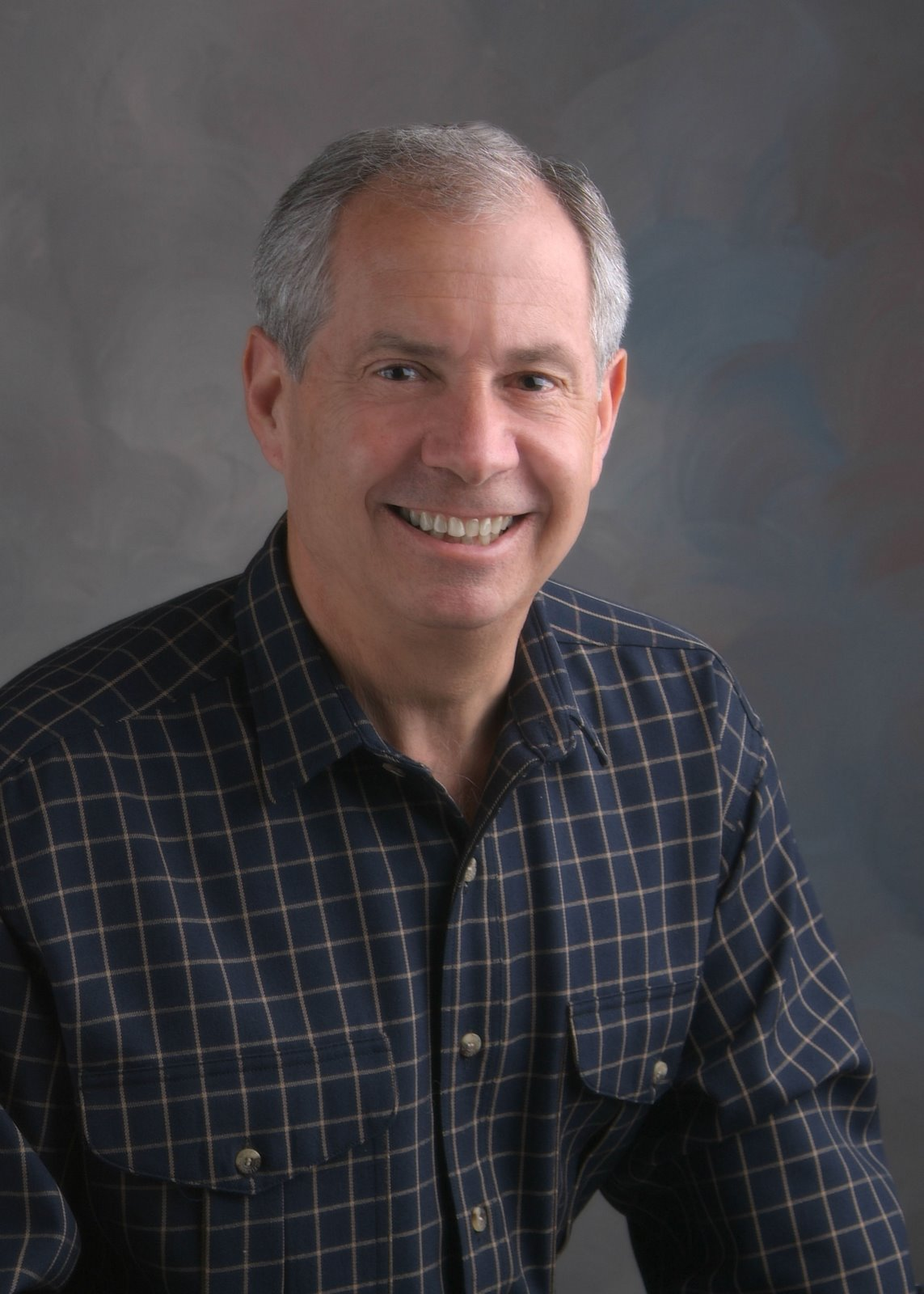

Member of the U.S. House of Representatives from Idaho's 1st district
- In office January 3, 1991 – January 3, 1995
- Preceded by: Larry Craig
- Succeeded by: Helen Chenoweth-Hage

Personal details
- Born: Lawrence Paul LaRocco; August 25, 1946 (age 80) Van Nuys, California, U.S.
- Party: Democratic
- Spouse: Chris Bideganeta
- Education: University of Portland (BA); Boston University (MS)
- Website: Campaign website

Military service
- Branch/service: United States Army
- Years of service: 1969–1972
- Rank: Captain
- Unit: United States Army Europe and Africa

Lawrence Paul LaRocco (born August 25, 1946) is an American politician who served two terms in the U.S. House of Representatives, representing the Idaho's 1st congressional district from 1991 to 1995.

LaRocco ran for the state's lieutenant governorship in 2006 and for the U.S. Senate in 2008, but was defeated by Jim Risch in the general election both times.

== Early life and family ==
LaRocco was born in Van Nuys, a neighborhood in the San Fernando Valley area of Los Angeles. He earned a Bachelor of Arts from the University of Portland in 1967. He earned his M.S. from Boston University in 1969. He also studied at the Johns Hopkins School of Advanced International Studies.

LaRocco and his wife Chris have two children and two grandchildren.

== Military service ==
LaRocco joined the U.S. Army and was commissioned on August 15, 1969; he was eventually promoted to captain and served in military intelligence at the Intelligence Data Handling Systems (IDHS) at 7th Army Headquarters in Heidelberg, Germany towards the end of his army career. On May 24, 1972, the Baader-Meinhof Gang, the precursor of the Red Army Faction, exploded a car bomb outside of Campbell Barracks which killed three of LaRocco's fellow soldiers. LaRocco was honorably discharged on June 10, 1972.

== Political career ==
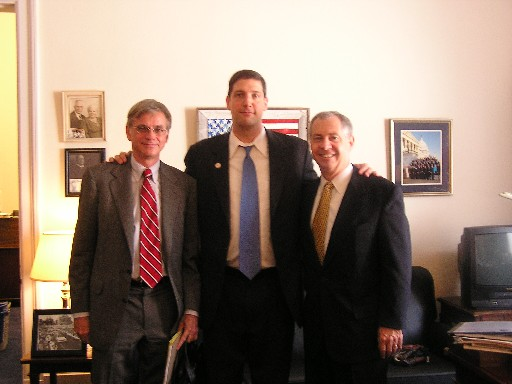
LaRocco with Tim Ryan and Sheldon D. Repp in 2003

In 1975, LaRocco took a job as northern Idaho field co-ordinator for Idaho U.S. Senator Frank Church, a position he held until Church's defeat in 1980; in 1976, he also was the co-ordinator for the Oregon primary election for Church's Presidential run.

In the 1982 elections, LaRocco was the Democratic nominee for Idaho's 1st congressional district; he lost to incumbent Larry Craig, but received 46.5 percent of the vote on his first try for public office. LaRocco also gained notice that year for taking jobs for one week in each of the district's 19 counties. He variously worked on a garbage truck, picked apples, waited on tables, worked in a nursing home and on a logging road crew, fed Coho smolt and processed cheese, among other things.

After the 1982 race, he became the vice-president of a brokerage firm in 1983. In 1986, he ran for the Idaho Legislature, losing an Idaho State Senate race in Ada County to Republican incumbent Jim Risch.

=== U.S. representative ===
LaRocco won Idaho's 1st congressional district seat in the United States House of Representatives in 1990 when incumbent Larry Craig ran successfully for the United States Senate. He was easily re-elected in 1992, winning every county in the district and with a 58% to 37% margin over his main opponent—a surprising margin, considering the 1st has historically been a very Republican district.

LaRocco was the only member of Congress from Idaho to vote for the Omnibus Budget Reconciliation Act of 1993. The vote proved to be quite unpopular in the district, and was exploited by Republicans in LaRocco's subsequent election campaigns.

=== 1994 affair and sexual discrimination controversy ===
In October 1994, as LaRocco campaigned for his third term in Congress, he became embroiled in a controversy involving an extramarital affair with a former sales assistant at Piper Jaffray, a brokerage firm where he worked previously. LaRocco had previously characterized rumors of the relationship as unfounded but later acknowledged the affair to The Idaho Statesman. In 2008, the Idaho State Journal reported that LaRocco had admitted misleading voters about the relationship.

The controversy also involved the woman's dismissal from the brokerage. According to The Idaho Statesman, the firm paid her $40,000 to settle a potential sexual discrimination claim. LaRocco maintained that he had acted on instructions from regional manager Bob Magnuson, who disputed that account and said that LaRocco acted independently.

The Spokesman-Review dubbed the controversy the "LaRocco Horror Picture Show." The Idaho Statesman declined to endorse LaRocco, citing his conduct in the employment dispute.

LaRocco was decisively defeated in his attempt to win a third term in 1994 by Republican Helen Chenoweth, becoming one of a large number of Democrats to lose their seats in a nationwide string of Republican victories as the Republicans took control of the House for the first time in 40 years. LaRocco would be the last Democrat to represent Idaho in Congress until the election of Walt Minnick to the 1st congressional district seat in 2008.

=== Lieutenant Governor campaign ===
On March 18, 2006, LaRocco filed to run for Lieutenant Governor of Idaho. In the May 23 primary he won the nomination but lost to Risch in the November 7, 2006 general election.

=== U.S. Senate campaign ===
In April 2007, LaRocco announced that he would be a candidate for the U.S. Senate. It was the third time LaRocco ran against Risch in an election, as LaRocco and Risch both decisively won their respective primaries on May 27, 2008. LaRocco's campaign invested in a grassroots network.

A key feature of the LaRocco campaign was his "Working for the Senate" program. During the campaign, LaRocco worked at thirty-five separate positions around the state of Idaho. He engaged his opponents in a series of debates around the state of Idaho. On August 18, 2008, he and Independent candidate Rex Rammell met for a one-hour debate in Coeur d'Alene. These two met again in Sandpoint on September 10. A third debate took place on the campus of the College of Idaho in Caldwell on September 25. LaRocco and Rammell were joined at this event by Libertarian candidate Kent Marmon and independent candidate Pro-Life (the legal name of the former Marvin Richardson).

A fourth debate was held between LaRocco and Rammell on October 1, 2008, at the University of Idaho, in Moscow.

KLEW-TV, the CBS affiliate located in Lewiston, hosted a debate on October 8 which featured Larry LaRocco, Jim Risch and Rex Rammell. This was the first time that the Republican candidate joined his opponents in a debate in 2008.

Rammell and LaRocco met once again for a debate in Idaho Falls on October 13. Three days later, the two debated for the seventh time. This time the debate was held on the campus of the College of Southern Idaho in Twin Falls.

KTVB-TV, the NBC affiliate located in Boise sponsored a debate on October 21 between Jim Risch, Larry LaRocco, Rex Rammell and Pro-Life on the campus of Northwest Nazarene College in Nampa. This 90 minute forum was co-hosted by the Idaho Press-Tribune and the Idaho Business Review. It marked only the second time that Republican Jim Risch was present for any of these debates.

The statewide debate hosted by Idaho Public Television, the League of Women Voters and the Idaho Press Club was held on October 23 in Boise. Four of the five candidates for the United States Senate were in attendance. Republican Jim Risch was not present.

U.S. House of Representatives
Preceded by Larry Craig	Member of the U.S. House of Representatives from Idaho's 1st congressional district 1991–1995	Succeeded by Helen Chenoweth-Hage
Party political offices
Preceded by Bruce Perry	Democratic nominee for Lieutenant Governor of Idaho; 2006	Succeeded by Eldon Wallace
Preceded by Alan Blinken	Democratic nominee for U.S. Senator from Idaho (Class 2); 2008	Succeeded by Nels Mitchell
U.S. order of precedence (ceremonial)
Preceded by Rick White as Former U.S. Representative	Order of precedence of the United States as Former U.S. Representative	Succeeded by Brad Carson as Former U.S. Representative
