= Post Register =

Daily newspaper in Idaho Falls, Idaho

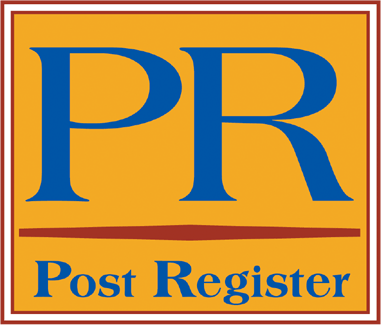
- Type: Daily newspaper
- Format: Broadsheet
- Owner: Adams MultiMedia
- Publisher: Travis Quast
- Managing editor: John Miller
- Founded: 1880 (as Idaho Register)
- Language: English
- Headquarters: 333 Northgate Mile, PO Box 1800; Idaho Falls, ID 83401; United States
- Circulation: 10,615 (as of 2021)
- ISSN: 2834-5851
- OCLC number: 12292787
- Website: postregister.com

The Post Register is a U.S. daily newspaper serving the Idaho Falls, Idaho, area, as well as Jackson, Wyoming, and West Yellowstone, Montana. It is owned by the Adams MultiMedia.

== History ==
In 1880, the Idaho Register was established and the Idaho Post was first published in 1903. M. B. Yeaman and W. S. Snyder purchased the Idaho Falls Times from S. W. Dennis and merged it with their Register to form the Idaho Falls Times-Register in 1920.

In 1925, James Robb Brady Sr., son of James H. Brady, purchased The Daily Post from brothers Benjamin and Cliff J. Read. He died a year later, found dead at his desk after suffering from ptomaine poisoning for several days. In 1931, the Brady estate and E. F. McDermott, owners of the Idaho Falls Post, purchased the Idaho Falls Times-Register and merged it with their paper to form the Post Register.

James Robb Brady Jr. was made publisher in 1977 after McDermott died. In 1984, Post Company CEO/president James M. Brady died. His brother Robb Jr. succeeded him as president and in 1988 he announced plans to sell controlling interests of the company to the family trusts of his brother James M. Brady's widow Marion L. Brady. At that time Post Co. also owned KIFI-TV. At that time Jerry Brady, James' son and Rob's nephew, became the paper's editor/publisher.

In 1998, a number of family shareholders sold 49% of their interest in the company to an Employee Stock Ownership Trust, and established employees of The Post Company as official stockholders of the business. The Brady family maintained enough stock, however, to maintain control of the company.

In 2002, the paper's owner Jerry Brady ran as a Democrat for Governor of Idaho and named Roger Plothow publisher. Brady lost the election to Governor Dirk Kempthorne. After losing the election, Brady officially turned over the title of editor and publisher to Plothow.

In 2005, the paper won the Scripps Howard Foundation's First Amendment prize for an exposé on pedophilia in scouting. Post-Register journalist Peter Zuckerman won the Livingston Award in the category of local reporting for his work on the same story. In 2011, Robb Jr. died.

In November 2015, the Post Company, which owned the Post Register as well as weekly newspapers Shelley Pioneer, Challis Messenger, and Jefferson Star, was purchased by the Adams Publishing Group, a family-owned media company based in St. Louis Park, Minnesota.
