= Robert C. Huntley =

American judge

Robert Huntley

Personal details
- Born: August 7, 1932 (age 93)
- Party: Democratic
- Education: University of Idaho (BS, JD); University of Virginia (LLM)

Robert C. Huntley Jr. (born August 7, 1932) is an American politician who was the Democratic nominee for Governor of Idaho in 1998. An attorney in Boise, he served on the Idaho Supreme Court from 1982 to 1989.

== Biography ==
Huntley graduated from the University of Idaho with a Bachelor of Science in 1954 and a Juris Doctor in 1959. He received a Master of Laws from the University of Virginia in 1988.

Huntley entered politics in 1962, serving on the Pocatello City Council until 1964, including a term as mayor. He served a term in the Idaho House of Representatives from 1965 until 1967, as well as on the Idaho Supreme Court from 1982 until 1989.

In the 1998 gubernatorial election, Huntley defeated three other candidates to win the Democratic primary with 54% of the vote. He lost the general election to Republican Dirk Kempthorne with 29% of the vote.

Legal offices
Preceded by Joseph J. McFadden	Justice of the Idaho Supreme Court; 1982–1989	Succeeded by Larry Monroe Boyle
Party political offices
Preceded by Larry EchoHawk	Democratic nominee for Governor of Idaho; 1998	Succeeded by Jerry Brady
