= 2002 Idaho gubernatorial election =

- November 5, 2002
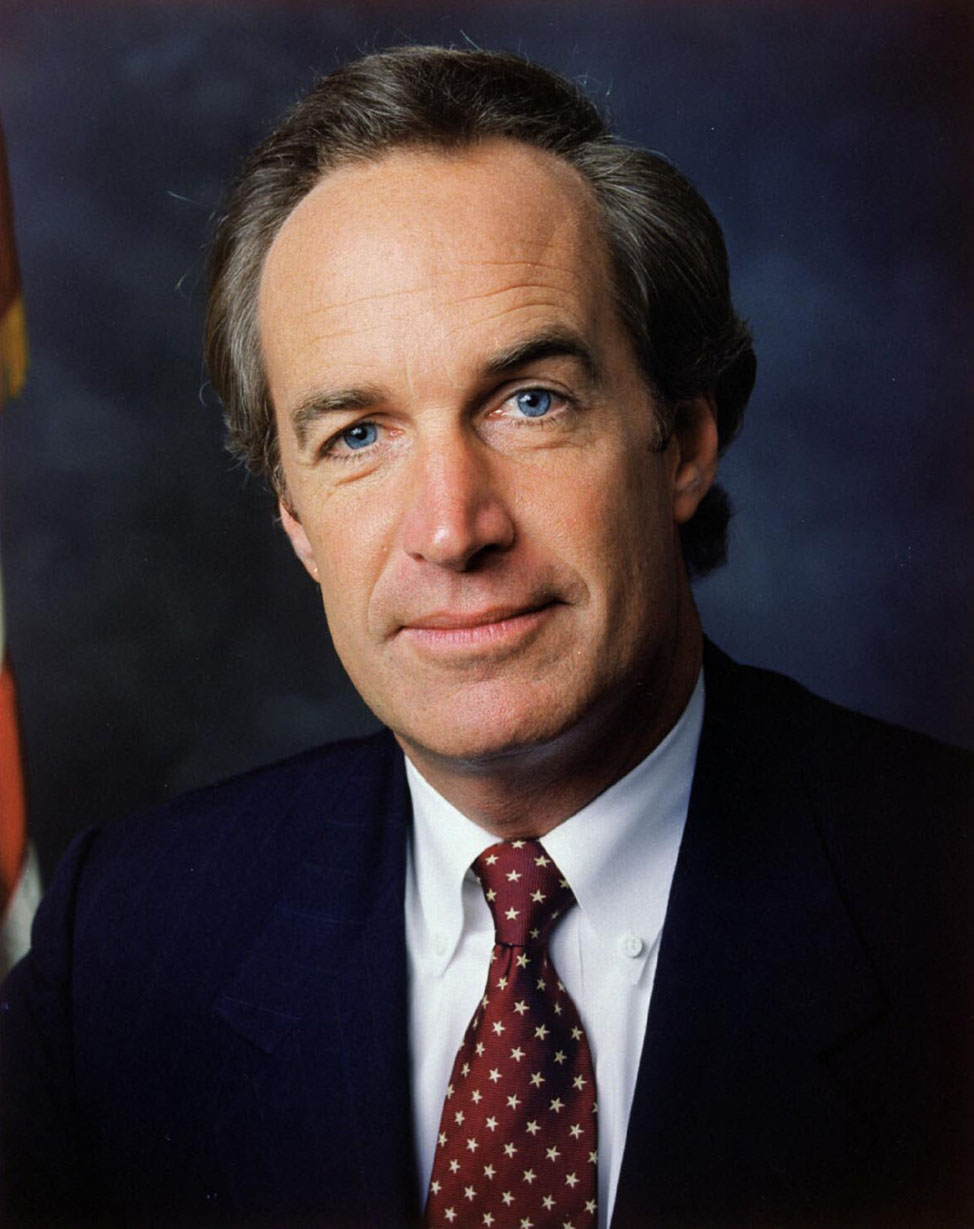

Nominee	Dirk Kempthorne	Jerry Brady
Party	Republican	Democratic
Popular vote	231,566	171,711
Percentage	56.28%	41.73%
- Kempthorne: 40–50% 50–60% 60–70% 70–80% 80–90% >90% Brady: 40–50% 50–60% 60–70% 70–80% 80–90% Adams: 50–60% Tie: 40–50% 50% No Votes
Governor before election
Dirk Kempthorne
Republican
Elected Governor
Dirk Kempthorne
Republican

The 2002 Idaho gubernatorial election was held on November 5, 2002 to select the governor of the state of Idaho. Dirk Kempthorne, the Republican incumbent, defeated Democratic nominee Jerry Brady to win a second term, but the win was not nearly as overwhelming as Kempthorne's 1998 victory. This was the first Idaho gubernatorial election since 1978 in which the winner was of the same party as the incumbent president. This was the first time since 1962 that an incumbent Republican Governor of Idaho was re-elected.

== Republican primary ==
=== Candidates ===
- Walter L. Bayes
- Milt Erhart, perennial candidate
- Raynelle J. George
- Dirk Kempthorne, incumbent Governor of Idaho

=== Results ===
Results by county Kempthorne: 50–60%; 60–70%; 70–80%; 80–90%

Republican primary results
Party	Candidate	Votes	%
Republican	Dirk Kempthorne (inc.)	95,882	65.88
Republican	Milt Erhart	37,523	25.78
Republican	Walter L. Bayes	6,873	4.72
Republican	Raynelle J. George	5,271	3.62
Total votes		145,549	100.00

== Democratic primary ==
=== Candidates ===
- Jerry Brady, newspaper publisher
- Rue T. Stears

=== Results ===
Results by county Brady: 60–70%; 70–80%; 80–90%; 90–100%

Democratic Primary results
Party	Candidate	Votes	%
Democratic	Jerry Brady	33,285	87.40
Democratic	Rue T. Stears	4,798	12.60
Total votes		38,083	100.00

== Libertarian primary ==
=== Candidates ===
- Daniel L. J. Adams, perennial candidate
- Michael Monroe Gollaher (write-in)

=== Results ===
Libertarian Primary results
Party	Candidate	Votes	%
Libertarian	Daniel L. J. Adams	997	90.14
Libertarian	Michael Monroe Gollaher (write-in)	109	9.86
Total votes		1,106	100.00

== General election ==
=== Campaign ===
Although Brady performed considerably better than 1998 Democratic gubernatorial nominee Robert C. Huntley, and won a plurality of the vote in Ada County, the state's most populous county, Kempthorne won reelection with a comfortable majority.

=== Predictions ===
Source	Ranking	As of
The Cook Political Report	Safe R	October 31, 2002
Sabato's Crystal Ball	Lean R	November 4, 2002

=== Results ===
Idaho gubernatorial election, 2002
Party	Candidate	Votes	%	±%
Republican	Dirk Kempthorne (inc.)	231,566	56.28	−11.42
Democratic	Jerry Brady	171,711	41.73	+12.66
Libertarian	Daniel L. J. Adams	8,187	1.99	
Write-ins		13	0.00	
Majority		59,855	14.55	−24.08
Turnout		411,477		
Republican hold		Swing		

==== Counties that flipped from Republican to Democratic ====
- Ada (largest municipality: Boise)
- Bannock (largest municipality: Pocatello)
- Nez Perce (Largest city: Lewiston)
- Shoshone (Largest city: Kellogg)
- Latah (Largest city: Moscow)

== See also ==
- Governor of Idaho
- List of governors of Idaho
- Idaho gubernatorial elections

Preceded by 1998	Idaho gubernatorial elections	Succeeded by 2006
