= 2006 Idaho gubernatorial election =

- November 7, 2006
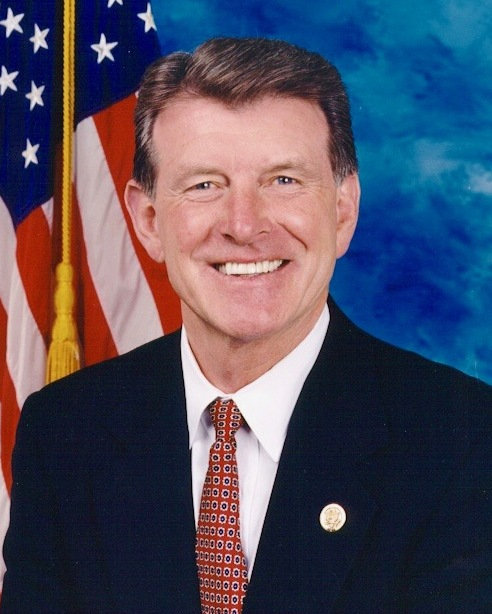

Nominee	Butch Otter	Jerry Brady
Party	Republican	Democratic
Popular vote	237,437	198,845
Percentage	52.67%	44.11%
- Otter: 40–50% 50–60% 60–70% 70–80% 80–90% >90% Brady: 40–50% 50–60% 60–70% 70–80% 80–90% >90% Tie: 50% No Votes
Governor before election
Jim Risch
Republican
Elected Governor
Butch Otter
Republican

The 2006 Idaho gubernatorial election was held on November 7, 2006. Incumbent Governor Jim Risch succeeded Dirk Kempthorne, who resigned May 26 to become Secretary of the Interior. Risch served as governor until the end of the term, but had committed to a reelection campaign for Lieutenant Governor before Kempthorne's appointment and subsequent resignation.

This was the last time that a Democrat won over 40% of the vote in Idaho.

== Republican primary ==
=== Candidates ===
- Dan Adamson, businessman and attorney
- Walter Bayes, perennial candidate
- Jack Alan Johnson
- C.L. "Butch" Otter, U.S. Representative and former Lieutenant Governor of Idaho

==== Declined ====
- Jim Risch, incumbent Governor of Idaho

=== Results ===
Results by county Otter: 50–60%; 60–70%; 70–80%; 80–90%

Republican primary results
Party	Candidate	Votes	%
Republican	Butch Otter	96,045	70.02
Republican	Dan Adamson	29,093	21.21
Republican	Jack Alan Johnson	7,652	5.58
Republican	Walter Bayes	4,385	3.20
Total votes		137,175	100.00

== Democratic primary ==
=== Candidates ===
- Jerry Brady, newspaper publisher and 2002 Democratic nominee for governor
- Lee Chaney, laborer

Results by county Brady: 60–70%; 70–80%; 80–90%; 90–100%; Tie: 50%

Democratic Primary results
Party	Candidate	Votes	%
Democratic	Jerry Brady	25,261	82.98
Democratic	Lee Chaney	5,182	17.02
Total votes		30,443	100.00

== General election ==
=== Candidates ===
- Marvin Richardson (unendorsed Constitution) – organic strawberry farmer and sawmill owner
- Jerry Brady (Democratic), newspaper publisher and 2002 Democratic nominee for governor
- Ted Dunlap (Libertarian)
- Butch Otter (Republican), U.S. Congressman, former Lieutenant Governor of Idaho

=== Controversy ===
A candidate legally named Marvin Pro-Life Richardson filed suit to force the state to print his full legal on the ballots, as filed in campaign paperwork. The Secretary of State stated that ballots themselves are supposed to be neutral, not political billboards, and declined the request. In September 2006 he changed his legal name to simply "Pro-Life" in an attempt to force the issue. However, the ballots went to the printer naming "Marvin Richardson" as the Constitution Party candidate. The party later disavowed his candidacy resulting in a candidate without a name, and without a party, appearing on the ballot.

=== Predictions ===
Source	Ranking	As of
The Cook Political Report	Tossup	November 6, 2006
Sabato's Crystal Ball	Tilt R	November 6, 2006
Rothenberg Political Report	Lean R	November 2, 2006
Real Clear Politics	Tossup	November 6, 2006

=== Results ===

Idaho gubernatorial election, 2006
Party	Candidate	Votes	%	±%
Republican	Butch Otter	237,437	52.67%	−3.61%
Democratic	Jerry Brady	198,845	44.11%	+2.38%
Constitution	Marvin Richardson	7,309	1.62%	
Libertarian	Ted Dunlap	7,241	1.61%	−0.38%
Majority		38,592	8.56%	−5.99%
Turnout		450,832		
Republican hold		Swing		

==== Counties that flipped from Republican to Democratic ====
- Teton (Largest city: Victor)
- Valley (Largest city: McCall)
