= Jerry Brady =

American businessman, explorer and politician

Personal details
- Born: Jerry Michael Brady; March 20, 1936 (age 90) Boise, Idaho, U.S.
- Party: Democratic
- Spouse: N/A (Wishes to remain anonymous)
- Children: 5
- Education: University of Notre Dame (BA); University of California, Berkeley (JD)
- Website: Campaign website

Jerry Michael Brady (born March 20, 1936) is an American businessman, explorer and politician from Idaho. He owns an Idaho Falls newspaper that is distributed in southeast Idaho and is a member of the Democratic Party.

Brady twice ran unsuccessfully for governor, losing in 2002 to incumbent Dirk Kempthorne and in 2006 to congressman Butch Otter.

Brady graduated from Idaho Falls High School in 1954 and the University of Notre Dame in 1958. He attended law school at the University of California (Boalt Hall) in Berkeley and earned a J.D. in 1962.

Beginning in 1963, Brady served as a legislative assistant to United States Senator Frank Church. From 1969 to 1972 Brady was the assistant director and later director of public affairs for the Peace Corps, and practiced law in Washington, D.C. from 1979 to 1984.

In 1984, Brady returned to Idaho to manage his family's media companies, first as general manager of KIFI-TV in Idaho Falls, then as publisher of the Post Register, Idaho Falls' daily newspaper which he owns. Brady currently serves as the newspaper's president.

Brady announced in 2006 that he would not pursue a third consecutive gubernatorial run in 2010.

Brady is a great-grandson of James H. Brady (1862–1918) of Pocatello, a Republican governor (1909–1911) and U.S. Senator (1913–1918). In November 1914, he became Idaho's first senator to be elected by direct popular vote, following the ratification of the 17th Amendment in 1913.

Idaho Gubernatorial Elections: Results 2002–2006
| Year | Democrat | Votes | Pct | Republican | Votes | Pct | 3rd Party | Party | Votes | Pct | 3rd Party | Party | Votes | Pct |
|---|---|---|---|---|---|---|---|---|---|---|---|---|---|---|
| 2002 | Jerry Brady | 171,711 | 41.7% | Dirk Kempthorne (inc.) | 231,566 | 56.3% | Daniel L.J. Adams | Libertarian | 8,187 | 2.0% | | | | |
| 2006 | Jerry Brady | 198,845 | 44.1% | Butch Otter | 237,437 | 52.7% | Marvin Richardson | Constitution | 7,309 | 1.6% | Steve Gothard | Libertarian | 7,241 | 1.6% |

Party political offices
| Preceded by Robert Huntley | Democratic nominee for Governor of Idaho; 2002, 2006 | Succeeded by Keith Allred |
