= 2008 United States Senate election in Idaho =

- November 4, 2008
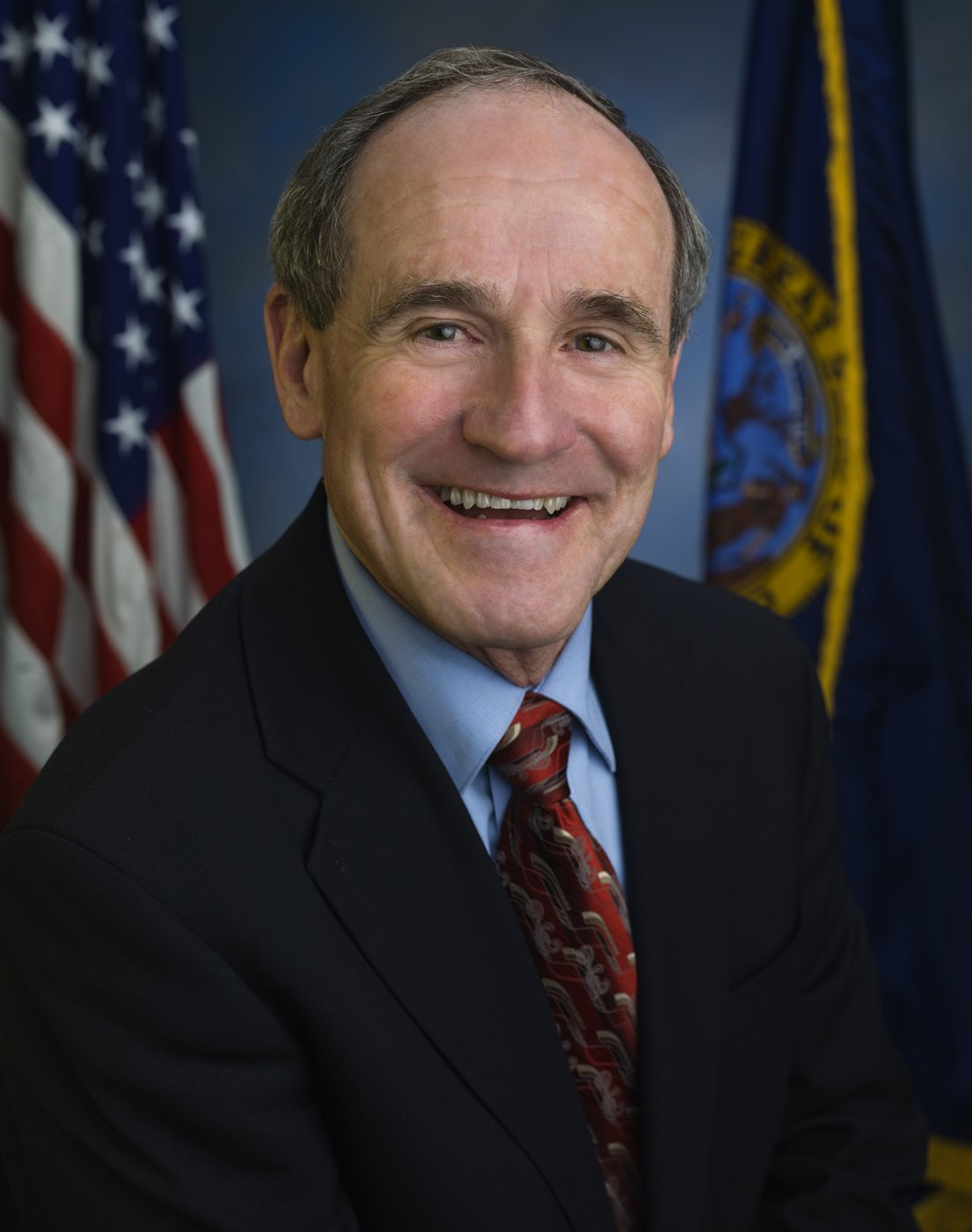

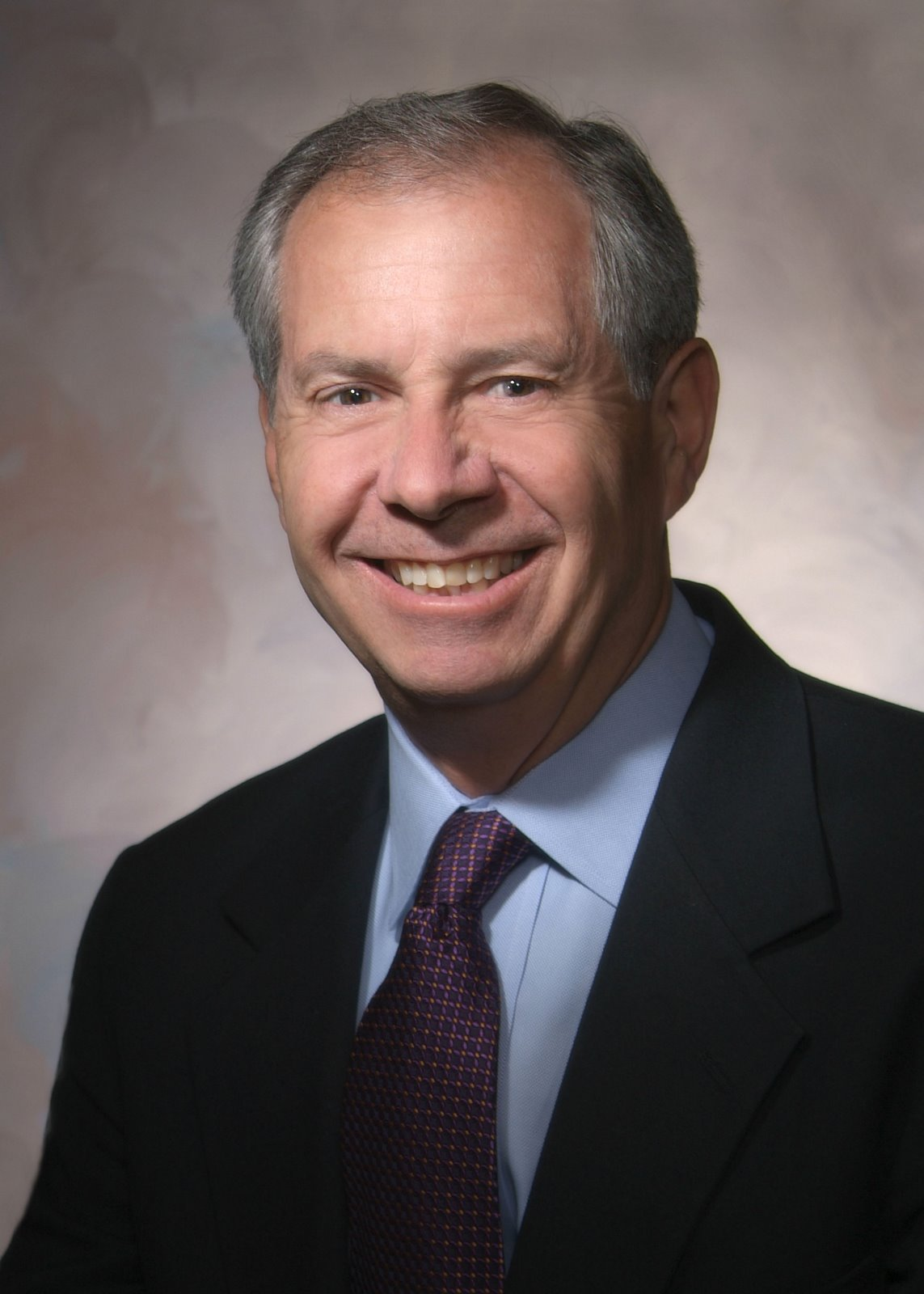

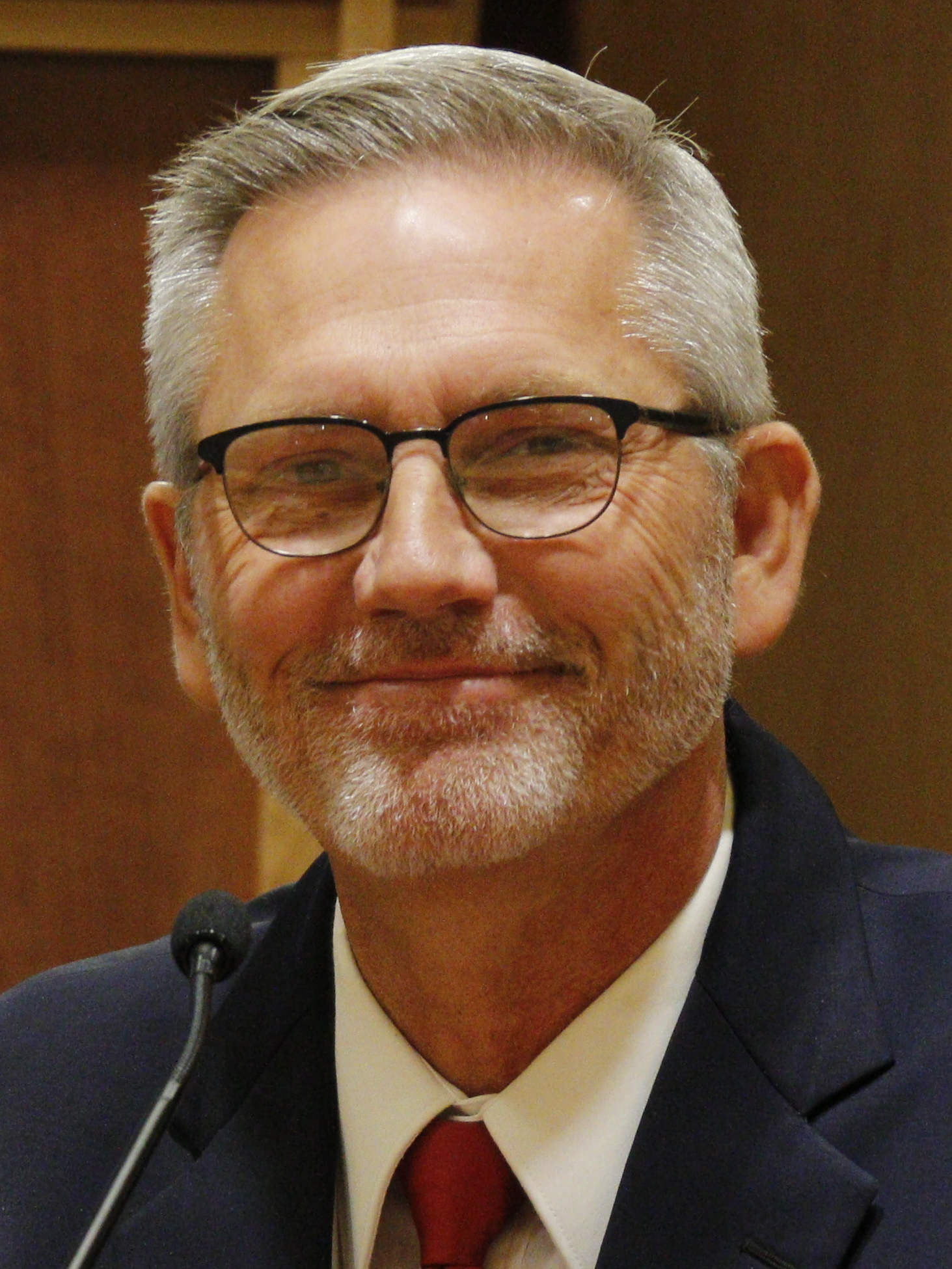
Nominee	Jim Risch	Larry LaRocco	Rex Rammell
Party	Republican	Democratic	Independent
Popular vote	371,744	219,903	34,510
Percentage	57.65%	34.11%	5.35%
- Risch: 40–50% 50–60% 60–70% 70–80% 80–90% >90% LaRocco: 40–50% 50–60% 60–70% 70–80% Rammell: 70–80% Marmon: >90% Tie: 40–50% No data
U.S. senator before election
Larry Craig
Republican
Elected U.S. Senator
Jim Risch
Republican

The 2008 United States Senate election in Idaho was held on November 4, 2008, to elect a member of the United States Senate to represent the state of Idaho. Republican lieutenant governor Jim Risch won his first term in office, defeating Democratic former congressman Larry LaRocco and independent perennial candidate Rex Rammell. Risch succeeded Republican incumbent Larry Craig who did not seek a fourth term.

Primary elections were held on May 27.

== Background ==
Incumbent Larry Craig announced his intent to resign following an incident where he allegedly solicited another man for gay sex in a public restroom. Craig later decided not to resign but did announce that he would not seek re-election. The filing deadline for the election was March 21, 2008. A total of 13 candidates filed for the seat. Republican and Democratic candidates ran for their respective nominations in the May 27 primary.

Lieutenant Governor Jim Risch defeated a crowded field for the Republican nomination, while former Congressman Larry LaRocco won the Democratic nomination in similar fashion. Conservative independents Rex Rammell and Pro-Life (formerly Marvin Richardson) also qualified for the general election ballot. Former Caldwell city council member Kent Marmon secured the Libertarian nomination. In the general election, Risch defeated LaRocco and the other candidates to keep the seat in Republican hands.

== Republican primary ==
=== Candidates ===
==== Nominee ====
- Jim Risch, lieutenant governor of Idaho

==== Eliminated in primary ====
- Fred Adams
- Brian Hefner
- Bill Hunter
- Richard Phenneger, Businessman
- Hal James Styles
- Scott Syme, Iraq War veteran
- Neal Thompson

=== Results ===
Results by county Risch: 40–50%; 50–60%; 60–70%; 70–80%

Republican primary results
Party	Candidate	Votes	%
Republican	Jim Risch	80,743	65.34%
Republican	Scott Syme	16,660	13.48%
Republican	Richard Phenneger	6,532	5.29%
Republican	Neal Thompson	5,375	4.35%
Republican	Fred M. Adams	4,987	4.04%
Republican	Bill Hunter	4,280	3.46%
Republican	Brian E. Hefner	2,915	2.36%
Republican	Hal James Styles, Jr.	2,082	1.68%
Total votes		123,574	100.00%

== Democratic primary ==
=== Candidates ===
==== Nominee ====
- Larry LaRocco, former U.S. representative for Idaho's 1st congressional district (1991–1995)

==== Eliminated in primary ====
- David J. Archuleta

=== Results ===
Results by county LaRocco: 50–60%; 60–70%; 70–80%; 80–90%; Archuleta: 50–60%; 60–70%

Democratic Primary results
Party	Candidate	Votes	%
Democratic	Larry LaRocco	29,023	72.35%
Democratic	David J. Archuleta	11,074	27.60%
Democratic	Write-ins	20	0.05%
Total votes		40,117	100.00%

== General election ==
=== Predictions ===
Source	Ranking	As of
The Cook Political Report	Safe R	October 23, 2008
CQ Politics	Safe R	October 31, 2008
Rothenberg Political Report	Safe R	November 2, 2008
Real Clear Politics	Safe R	November 4, 2008

=== Polling ===
Aggregate polls

Source of poll aggregation	Dates administered	Dates updated	Jim Risch (R)	Larry LaRocco (D)	Other/Undecided (Note: Calculated by taking the difference of 100% and all other candidates combined.)	Margin
Rasmussen Reports	September 9, 2008	September 9, 2008	58.0%	30.0%	12.0%	Risch +28.0%
RealClearPolitics	August 18–September 17, 2008	September 17, 2008	51.7%	30.7%	17.6%	Risch +21.0%
Average			54.9%	30.4%	14.7%	Risch +24.5%

Poll source	Date(s) administered	Sample size (Note: Key: A – all adults RV – registered voters LV – likely voters V – unclear)	Margin of error	Jim Risch (R)	Larry LaRocco (D)	Rex Rammell (I)	Other	Undecided
Research 2000 (Note: Poll sponsored by Daily Kos)	September 16–17, 2008	500 (LV)	± 4.0%	56%	33%	3%	3%	5%
Rasmussen Reports	September 9, 2008	500 (LV)	± 4.0%	58%	30%	–	2%	9%
Greg Smith Polling	August 18–22, 2008	600 (LV)	± 4.0%	41%	30%	3%	–	26%
Research 2000	July 28–30, 2008	500 (LV)	± 4.5%	42%	32%	5%	4%	17%
Celinda Lake (D) (Note: Poll sponsored by LaRocco's campaign)	May 20–25, 2008	500 (LV)	± 4.5%	43%	28%	5%	–	24%
Robinson Research	November 27 – December 12, 2007	–	–	46%	27%	–	–	27%
Myers Research (D)	November 13–19, 2007	600 (LV)	–	48%	34%	–	–	18%
SurveyUSA	September 6, 2007	534 (RV)	± 4.3%	52%	36%	–	–	13%

Hypothetical polling

Generic Republican vs. Generic Democrat

Poll source	Date(s) administered	Sample size	Margin of error	Generic Republican	Generic Democrat	Other	Undecided
Myers Research (D)	November 13–19, 2007	600 (LV)	–	36%	42%	1%	21%

Dirk Kempthorne vs. Larry LaRocco

Poll source	Date(s) administered	Sample size	Margin of error	Dirk Kempthorne (R)	Larry LaRocco (D)	Other	Undecided
SurveyUSA	September 6, 2007	534 (RV)	± 4.3%	55%	36%	–	9%

David Leroy vs. Larry LaRocco

Poll source	Date(s) administered	Sample size	Margin of error	David Leroy (R)	Larry LaRocco (D)	Other	Undecided
SurveyUSA	September 6, 2007	534 (RV)	± 4.3%	42%	39%	–	19%

Mike Simpson vs. Larry LaRocco

Poll source	Date(s) administered	Sample size	Margin of error	Mike Simpson(R)	Larry LaRocco (D)	Other	Undecided
SurveyUSA	September 6, 2007	534 (RV)	± 4.3%	54%	34%	–	12%

Lawrence Wasden vs. Larry LaRocco

Poll source	Date(s) administered	Sample size	Margin of error	Lawrence Wasden (R)	Larry LaRocco (D)	Other	Undecided
SurveyUSA	September 6, 2007	534 (RV)	± 4.3%	46%	36%	–	17%

Dane Watkins vs. Larry LaRocco

Poll source	Date(s) administered	Sample size	Margin of error	Dane Watkins (R)	Larry LaRocco (D)	Other	Undecided
SurveyUSA	September 6, 2007	534 (RV)	± 4.3%	40%	41%	–	19%

== Results ==
General election results
Party	Candidate	Votes	%	±%
Republican	Jim Risch	371,744	57.65%	−7.51%
Democratic	Larry LaRocco	219,903	34.11%	+1.56%
Independent	Rex Rammell	34,510	5.35%	
Libertarian	Kent Marmon	9,958	1.54%	−0.75%
Independent	Pro-Life	8,662	1.35%	
Write-in		3	0.00%	
Majority		151,841	23.55%	−9.06%
Turnout		644,780		
Republican hold				

=== Counties that flipped from Republican to Democratic ===
- Latah (largest municipality: Moscow)
- Shoshone (largest municipality: Kellogg)
- Teton (largest municipality: Victor)

== See also ==
- 2008 United States House of Representatives elections in Idaho
- 2008 United States presidential election in Idaho

== Notes ==
Partisan clients
