= 1998 Idaho gubernatorial election =

- November 3, 1998
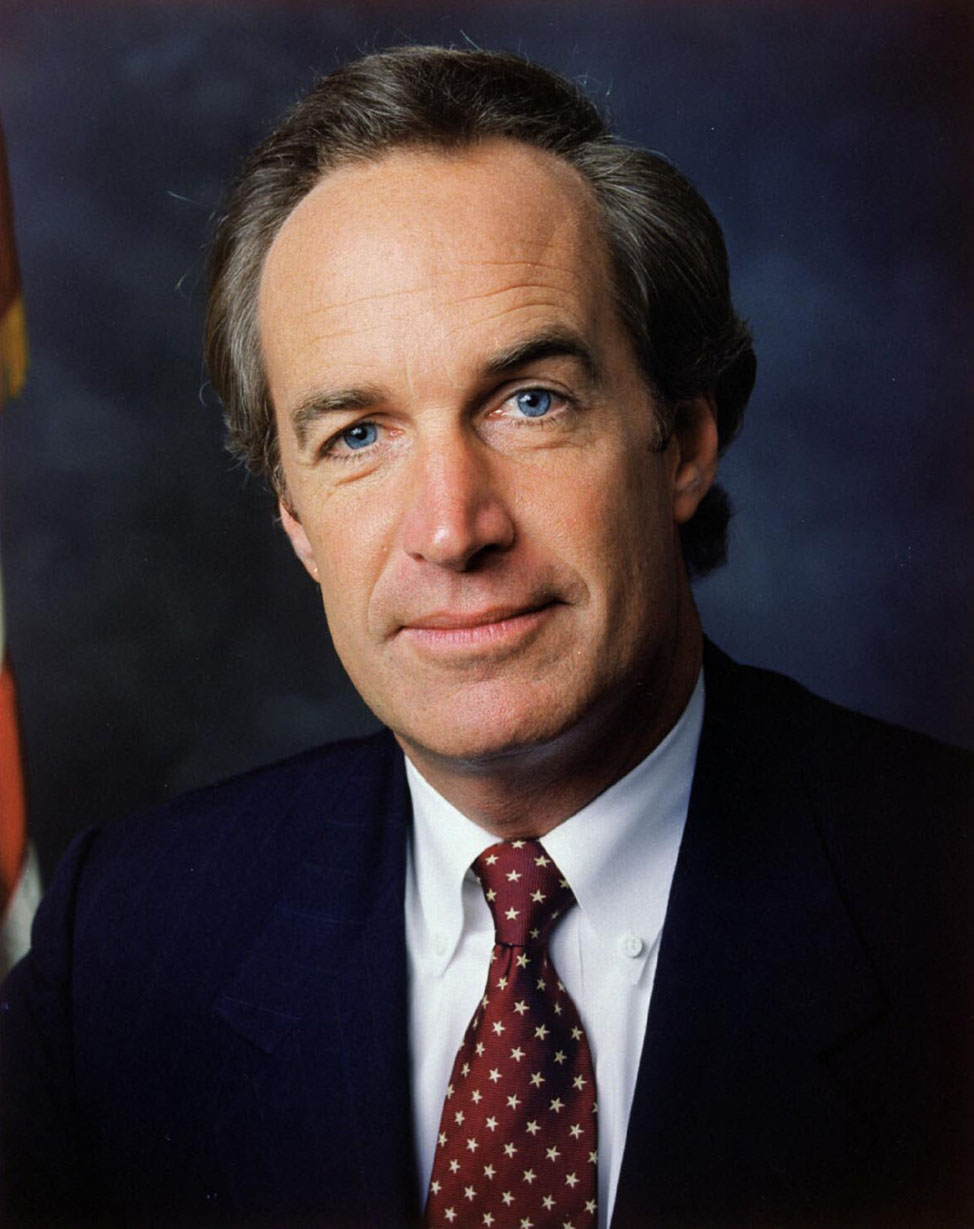

| Nominee | Dirk Kempthorne | Robert Huntley |
| Party | Republican | Democratic |
| Popular vote | 258,095 | 110,815 |
| Percentage | 67.70% | 29.07% |
- County results Kempthorne: 50–60% 60–70% 70–80% 80–90% Huntley: 50–60%
Governor before election
Phil Batt
Republican
Elected Governor
Dirk Kempthorne
Republican

The 1998 Idaho gubernatorial election was held on November 3, 1998, to elect the Governor of Idaho. Phil Batt, the Republican incumbent, chose not to run for a second term. The Republican nominee, United States Senator Dirk Kempthorne, handily defeated the Democratic nominee, former Idaho Supreme Court justice Robert C. Huntley, to keep the seat in GOP hands.

== Republican primary ==
=== Candidates ===
- Dirk Kempthorne, U.S. Senator
- David W. Sheperd, perennial candidate

=== Results ===
Results by county Kempthorne: 70–80%; 80–90%; 90–100%

Republican primary results
| Party | Candidate | Votes | % |
|---|---|---|---|
| Republican | Dirk Kempthorne | 111,658 | 87.24 |
| Republican | David W. Sheperd | 16,332 | 12.76 |
| Total votes | | 127,990 | 100.00 |

== Democratic primary ==
=== Candidates ===
- Jack Wayne Chappell
- Robert C. Huntley, former Idaho Supreme Court Justice, former Idaho State Representative, former Pocatello city councilman
- Donald McMurrian
- William Tarnasky

=== Results ===
Results by county Huntley: 30–40%; 40–50%; 50–60%; 60–70%; 70–80%; Tarnasky: 30–40%; 40–50%; 50–60%; Chappell: 50–60%; Tie: 30–40%

Democratic Primary results
| Party | Candidate | Votes | % |
|---|---|---|---|
| Democratic | Robert C. Huntley | 14,638 | 54.27 |
| Democratic | William Tarnasky | 4,769 | 17.68 |
| Democratic | Jack Wayne Chappell | 4,666 | 17.30 |
| Democratic | Donald McMurrian | 2,900 | 10.75 |
| Total votes | | 26,973 | 100.00 |

== General election ==
=== Debate ===
1998 Idaho gubernatorial debate
| No. | Date | Host | Moderator | Link | Republican | Democratic | Independent |
| Key: P Participant A Absent N Not invited I Invited W Withdrawn | | | | | | | |
| Key: P Participant A Absent N Not invited I Invited W Withdrawn | | | | | Dirk Kempthorne | Robert C. Huntley | Peter Rickards |
|---|---|---|---|---|---|---|---|
| 1 | Oct. 22, 1998 | Idaho Press Club; Idaho Public Television; League of Women Voters of Idaho | Joan Cartan-Hansen | PBS | P | P | P |

=== Polling ===
| Poll source | Date(s) administered | Sample size (Note: Key: A – all adults RV – registered voters LV – likely voters V – unclear) | Margin of error | Dirk Kempthorne (R) | Robert Huntley (D) | Undecided |
|---|---|---|---|---|---|---|
| Mason Dixon | September 1–3, 1998 | 1,208 (LV) | ± 2.9% | 66% | 14% | 20% |

=== Results ===
Given the lack of a high-profile candidate on the Democratic side, throughout the campaign many considered Kempthorne's election a foregone conclusion. Indeed, Huntley's performance was well below that of the 1994 Democratic nominee Larry EchoHawk. In addition, Peter Rickards, a podiatrist and anti-nuclear waste advocate from Twin Falls, won over some progressive votes that may have otherwise gone to the Democratic candidate.

Idaho gubernatorial election, 1998
| Party | Candidate | Votes | % | ±% |
|---|---|---|---|---|
| Republican | Dirk Kempthorne | 258,095 | 67.70 | +15.41 |
| Democratic | Robert C. Huntley | 110,815 | 29.07 | −14.81 |
| Independent | Peter Rickards | 12,338 | 3.24 | |
| Majority | | 147,280 | 38.63 | +30.22 |
| Turnout | | 381,248 | | |
| Republican hold | | Swing | | |

== See also ==
- Governor of Idaho
- List of governors of Idaho
- Idaho gubernatorial elections

== Notes ==
| Preceded by 1994 | Idaho gubernatorial elections | Succeeded by 2002 |
