= Dirk Kempthorne =

American politician (1951–2026)

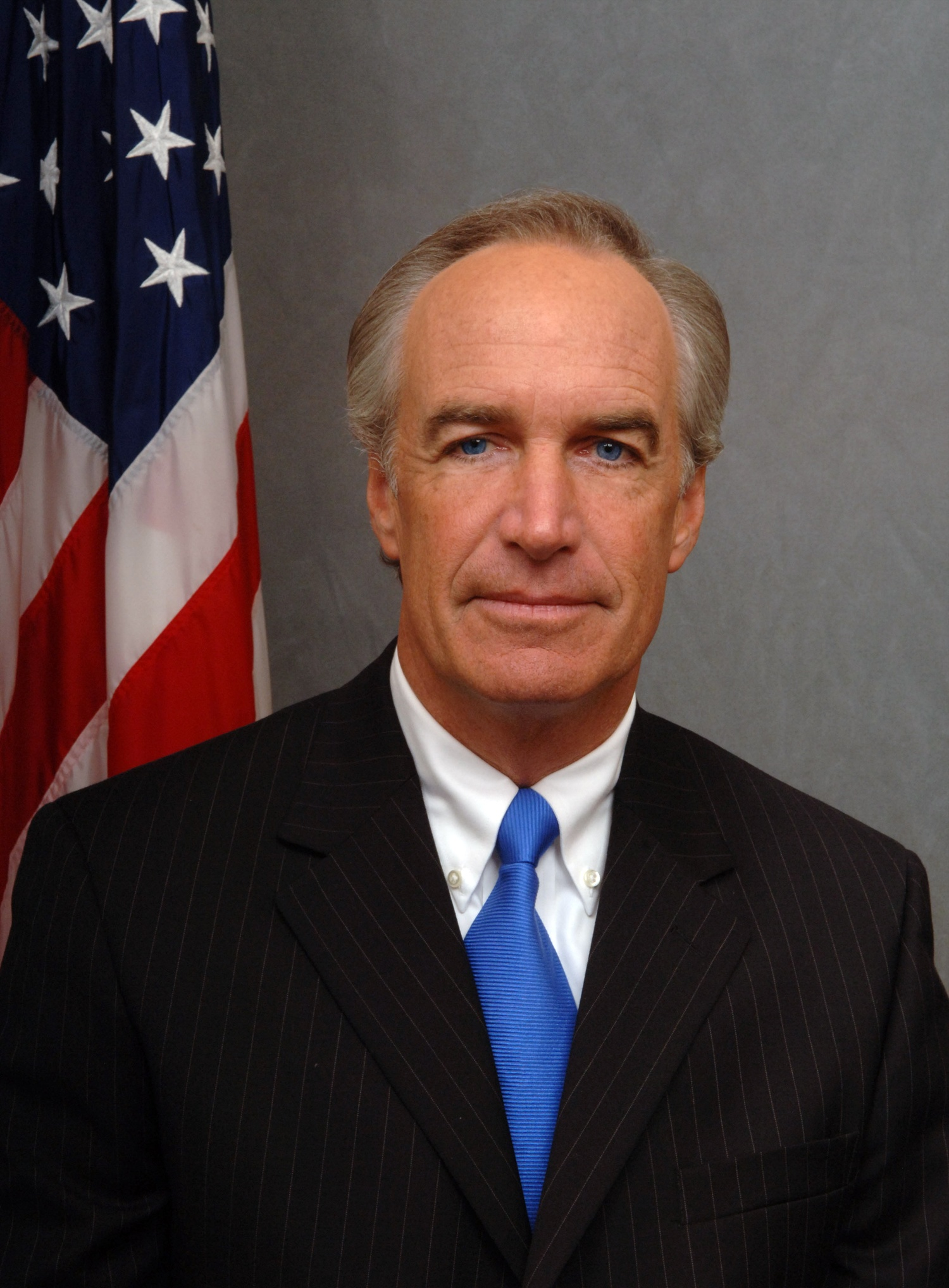
- Official portrait, 2006

49th United States Secretary of the Interior
- In office May 26, 2006 – January 19, 2009
- President: George W. Bush
- Preceded by: Gale Norton
- Succeeded by: Ken Salazar

Chair of the National Governors Association
- In office August 19, 2003 – July 20, 2004
- Preceded by: Paul Patton
- Succeeded by: Mark Warner

30th Governor of Idaho
- In office January 4, 1999 – May 26, 2006
- Lieutenant: Butch Otter; Jack Riggs; Jim Risch
- Preceded by: Phil Batt
- Succeeded by: Jim Risch

United States Senator from Idaho
- In office January 3, 1993 – January 3, 1999
- Preceded by: Steve Symms
- Succeeded by: Mike Crapo

51st Mayor of Boise
- In office January 6, 1986 – January 5, 1993
- Preceded by: Richard Eardley
- Succeeded by: H. Brent Coles

Personal details
- Born: Dirk Arthur Kempthorne; October 29, 1951 San Diego, California, U.S.
- Died: April 24, 2026 (aged 74) Boise, Idaho, U.S.
- Party: Republican
- Spouse: Patricia Kempthorne (m. 1977)
- Children: 2
- Education: San Bernardino Valley College (attended); University of Idaho (BA)

Dirk Arthur Kempthorne (October 29, 1951 – April 24, 2026) was an American politician from the state of Idaho. A Republican, he served as a United States senator from Idaho from 1993 to 1999, as the 30th governor of Idaho from 1999 to 2006, and as the 49th U.S. secretary of the interior from 2006 to 2009 under President George W. Bush.

Kempthorne was first elected to public office as mayor of Boise in 1985, where he served for seven years. He served as a co-chair of the Democracy Project at the Bipartisan Policy Center. In November 2010, he was appointed president and CEO of the American Council of Life Insurers.

== Background ==
Born in San Diego on October 29, 1951, and raised in San Bernardino, California, Kempthorne graduated from San Gorgonio High School in San Bernardino. He attended San Bernardino Valley College, then transferred north to the University of Idaho in Moscow, from which he graduated in 1975 with a degree in political science, and served a term as student body president. Upon graduation Kempthorne served as an assistant to the director of the Idaho Department of Lands and then as executive vice president of the Idaho Home Builders Association.

In 1982, Kempthorne managed the gubernatorial campaign for Lieutenant Governor Phil Batt, who lost to the incumbent Democrat, Governor John V. Evans. In 1983 Kempthorne became state public affairs manager for FMC Corporation.

=== Personal life and death ===
Kempthorne and his wife, Patricia Kempthorne, also a UI graduate, had two adult children, Heather and Jeff.

He was of Cornish ancestry.

On March 31, 2025, Kempthorne announced that he had been diagnosed with colon cancer and would begin chemotherapy. He died in Boise on April 24, 2026, at the age of 74.

== Political career ==
=== Mayor of Boise ===
Kempthorne's first major political victory came at age thirty-four, when he was elected mayor of Boise in 1985. As mayor, Kempthorne became very popular and was unopposed for reelection in 1989.

=== U.S. Senate ===
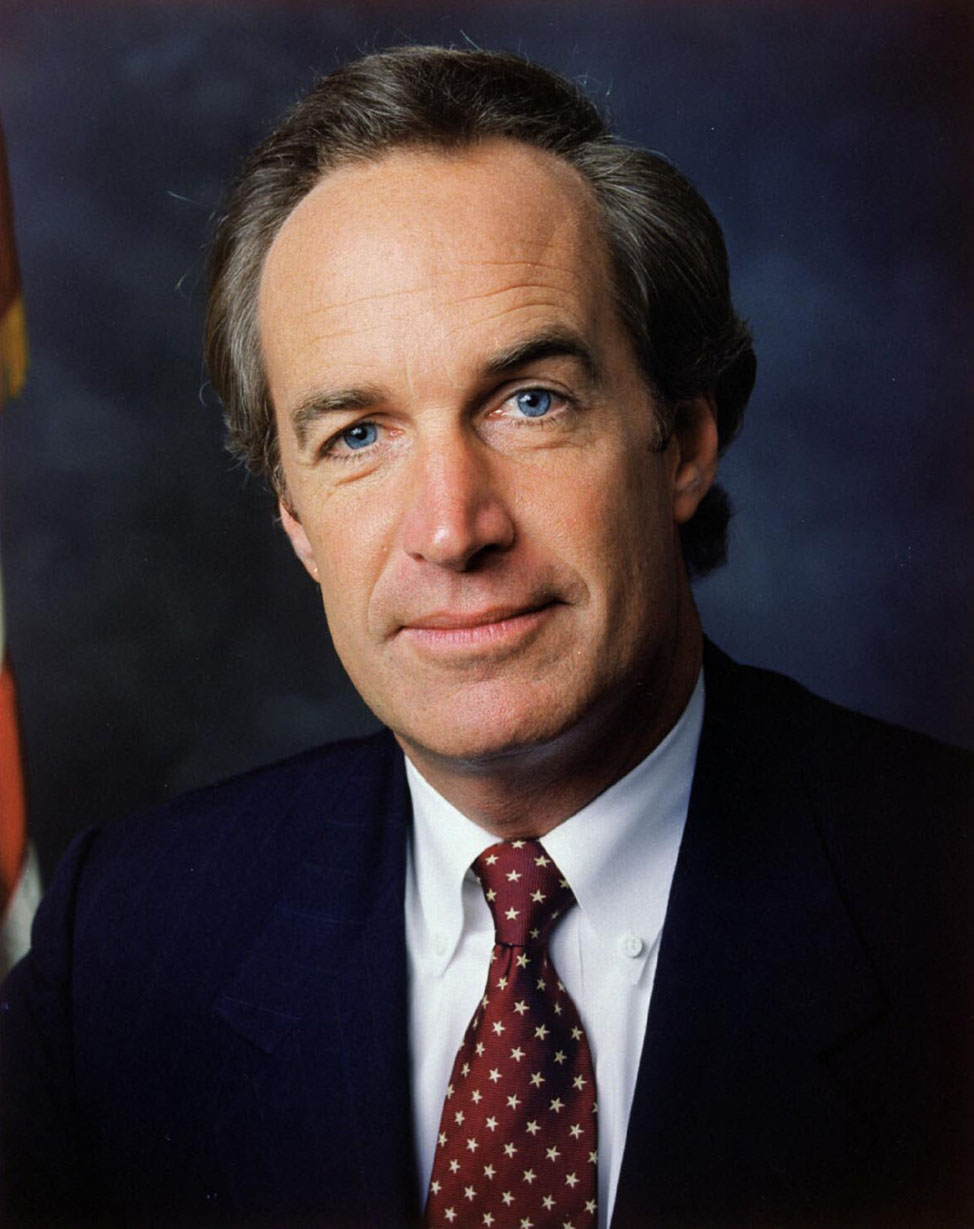
Kempthorne during his tenure in the United States Senate

In 1992, U.S. Senator Steve Symms decided not to seek a third term and Kempthorne pursued the Republican nomination for the seat. In the general election, Kempthorne defeated Democratic congressman Richard H. Stallings.

In the Senate, Kempthorne sponsored and helped pass the Unfunded Mandates Reform Act of 1995, a bill meant to prohibit Congress from imposing unfunded federal mandates on states. The bill aimed to:

[C]urb the practice of imposing unfunded Federal mandates on States and local governments; to strengthen the partnership between the Federal Government and State, local and tribal governments; to end the imposition, in the absence of full consideration by Congress, of Federal mandates on State, local, and tribal governments without adequate funding, in a manner that may displace other essential governmental priorities; and to ensure that the Federal Government pays the costs incurred by those governments in complying with certain requirements under Federal statutes and regulations, and for other purposes.

Also in 1995, Senator Kempthorne introduced amendments to the Safe Drinking Water Act. This bill was signed into law by President Bill Clinton on August 6, 1996.

During his six years in the Senate, Kempthorne scored a "0" on the League of Conservation Voters' legislative scorecards every year except 1993, when he scored 6 percent on the basis of one vote against funding a rocket booster for the space program that environmentalists judged harmful to the environment. His overall LCV score for that period was less than 1%.

U.S. Senate elections in Idaho (Class III): Results 1992
Year	Democrat	Votes	Pct	Republican	Votes	Pct
1992	Richard Stallings	208,036	43.5%	Dirk Kempthorne	270,468	56.5%

=== Governor of Idaho ===
Kempthorne was expected to run for reelection in 1998, but instead decided to run for the open seat for governor. The incumbent, Phil Batt, shocked the state by announcing his retirement after only one term in office, citing his age (71) as the prime factor in his decision. Kempthorne's Senate seat would be won by Republican congressman Mike Crapo of Idaho Falls.

Kempthorne won the gubernatorial election in a landslide, receiving 68 percent of the vote while his Democratic opponent, Robert C. Huntley, received only 29 percent. He was reelected in 2002 with 56 percent of the vote; his Democratic opponent, Jerry Brady, polled 42 percent. Kempthorne's campaign spent nearly $200,000 more than it had received in contributions prior to the election. Subsequently, he spent the next two years raising funds to pay off the campaign debt.

Idaho Gubernatorial Elections: Results 1998–2002
Year	Democrat	Votes	Pct	Republican	Votes	Pct	3rd Party	Party	Votes	Pct
1998	Robert Huntley	184,142	29.1%	Dirk Kempthorne	258,095	67.7%	Peter Rickards	Independent	12,388	3.2%
2002	Jerry Brady	171,711	41.7%	Dirk Kempthorne (inc.)	231,566	56.3%	Daniel L.J. Adams	Libertarian	8,187	2.0%

=== U.S. Secretary of the Interior ===
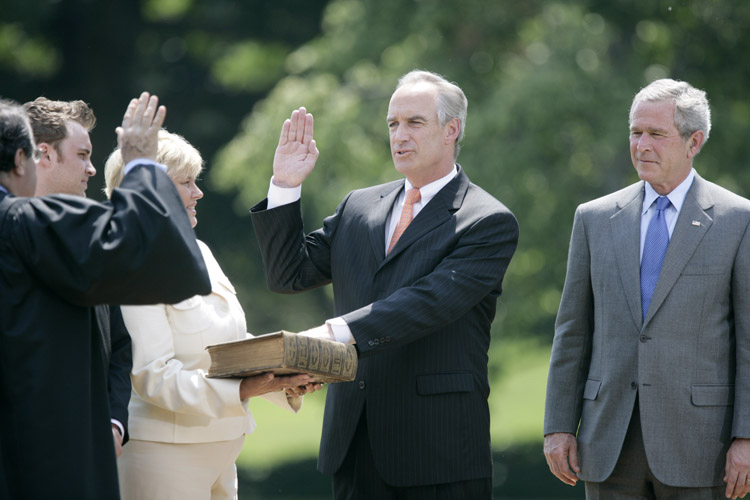
Kempthorne was sworn in as Secretary of the Interior on June 7, 2006.

On March 16, 2006, Kempthorne was nominated by President George W. Bush to replace Gale Norton and become the 49th United States Secretary of the Interior. On May 10, 2006, Kempthorne's nomination was approved by voice vote by the United States Senate Committee on Energy and Natural Resources. He was confirmed by the full Senate on May 26 and resigned as Idaho Governor to accept the position the same day. Lieutenant Governor Jim Risch succeeded Kempthorne as Idaho Governor, filling out the remaining months of his term.

Upon Kempthorne's appointment as Secretary of the Interior, environmental groups characterized him as someone who has "almost always favored changing laws like the Endangered Species Act and the Safe Drinking Water Act to make them more favorable to commercial interests."

As Secretary of the Interior, Kempthorne was criticized for not placing any plants or animals on the U.S. Federal Endangered Species list from the time of his confirmation on May 26, 2006. As of September 2007, Kempthorne held the record for protecting fewer species over his tenure than any Interior Secretary in United States history, a record previously held by James G. Watt for over 20 years.

In December 2007, as a result of a long-term investigation and resignation of former Deputy Assistant Secretary Julie MacDonald, Inspector General Earl Devaney found "abrupt and abrasive, if not abusive" management at the department under Kempthorne's supervision. U.S. Senator Ron Wyden, chairman of the Senate Subcommittee on Public Lands and Forests, attributed the "untold waste of hundreds of thousands of taxpayers' dollars" to MacDonald's actions. Of the department, U.S. Representative Nick J. Rahall II, chairman of the House Natural Resources, said, "The results of this investigation paint a picture of something akin to a secret society residing within the Interior Department that was colluding to undermine the protection of endangered wildlife and covering for one another's misdeeds."

In September 2008, Devaney reported wrongdoing by current and former employees of the Minerals Management Service, an agency under Kempthorne's administration that collects about $10 billion in oil and gas royalties annually, and one of the government's largest sources of revenue other than taxes. According to The New York Times, "Eight officials in the royalty program accepted gifts from energy companies whose value exceeded limits set by ethics rules—including golf, ski and paintball outings; meals and drinks; and tickets to a Toby Keith concert, a Houston Texans football game and a Colorado Rockies baseball game ... The investigation also concluded that several of the officials "frequently consumed alcohol at industry functions, had used cocaine and marijuana, and had sexual relationships with oil and gas company representatives." The New York Times reported a whistleblower had officially complained about the wrongdoings in the spring of 2006, prior to Kempthorne's being sworn into the office.

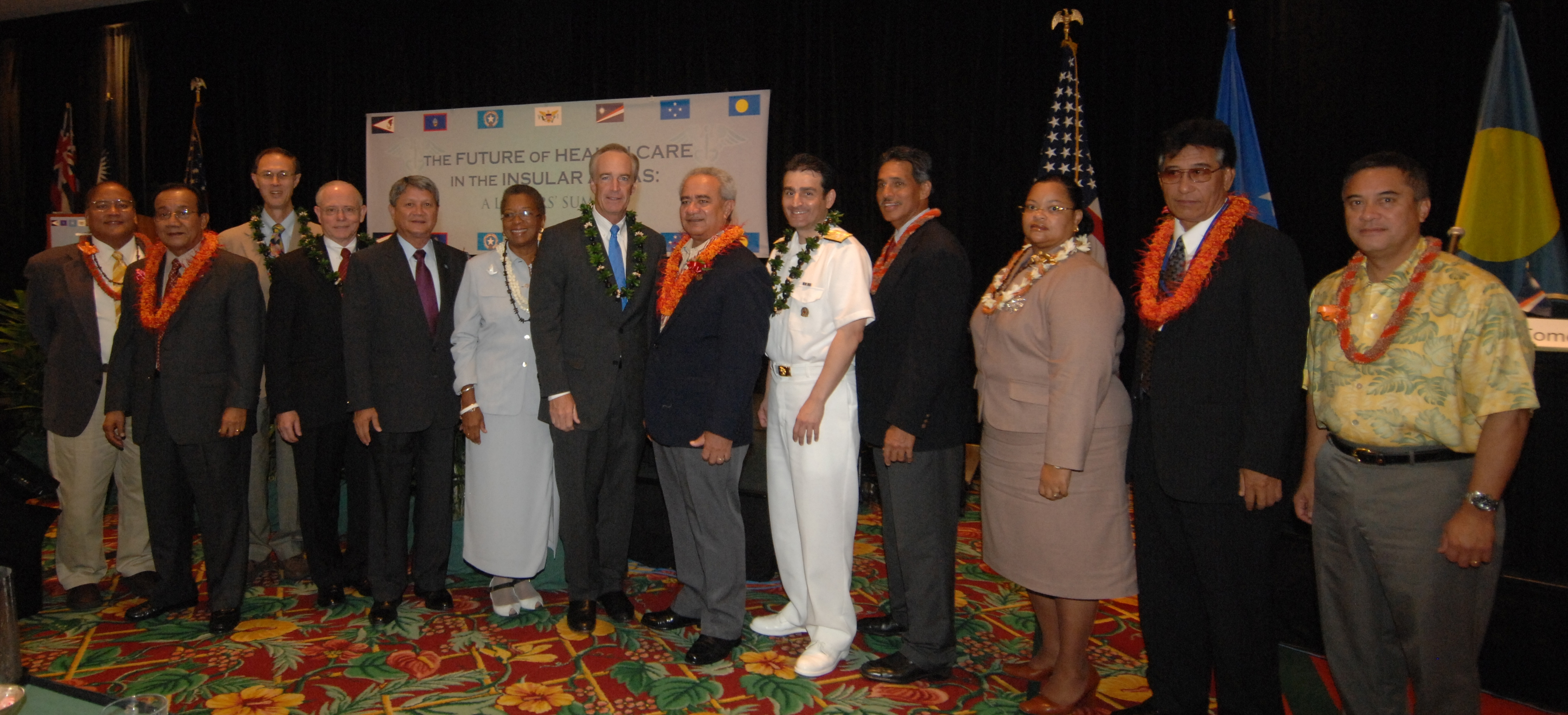
Secretary of the Interior Dirk Kempthorne joins federal and island leaders for a group picture at the Insular Areas Health Summit

On December 16, 2008, the Center for Biological Diversity announced intent to sue the Interior Department under Kempthorne for introducing "regulations ... that would eviscerate our nation's most successful wildlife law by exempting thousands of federal activities, including those that generate greenhouse gases, from review under the Endangered Species Act." The lawsuit, which is critical of policy advocated by Kempthorne and President George W. Bush, was filed in the Northern District of California by the CBD, Greenpeace, and Defenders of Wildlife. According to the CBD, "The lawsuit argues that the regulations violate the Endangered Species Act and did not go through the required public review process. The regulations, first proposed on August 11th, were rushed by the Bush administration through an abbreviated process in which more than 300,000 comments from the public were reviewed in 2–3 weeks, and environmental impacts were analyzed in a short and cursory environmental assessment, rather than a fuller environmental impact statement."

In 2009, CNN correspondent Campbell Brown criticized Kempthorne for using "$235,000 of [taxpayer] money to renovate his office bathroom at the Department of Interior." According to Brown, the costs included a shower, a refrigerator, and a freezer hidden behind lavish wood paneling, as well as "DK" monogrammed towels. Donald Swain, Chief of the Interior Department's National Business Center said the towels do not exist. He further said the project came in $10,000 under budget and was approved by the General Services Administration.

== See also ==
- Wise Use Movement
- List of people from San Bernardino, California § Politics
- List of people from Idaho
  - List of people from Boise, Idaho
- List of University of Idaho people § Government
- List of mayors of Boise, Idaho
- List of governors of Idaho
- List of United States senators from Idaho
- List of new members of the 103rd United States Congress
- List of United States senators in the 103rd Congress
- List of United States senators in the 104th Congress
- List of United States senators in the 105th Congress
- List of former United States senators

Political offices
Preceded by Richard Eardley	Mayor of Boise; 1986–1993	Succeeded by H. Brent Coles
Preceded by Phil Batt	Governor of Idaho; 1999–2006	Succeeded by Jim Risch
Preceded by Paul E. Patton	Chair of the National Governors Association; 2003–2004	Succeeded by Mark Warner
Preceded by Gale Norton	United States Secretary of the Interior; 2006–2009	Succeeded by Ken Salazar
Party political offices
Preceded by Steve Symms	Republican nominee for U.S. Senator from Idaho (Class 3); 1992	Succeeded by Mike Crapo
Preceded by Phil Batt	Republican nominee for Governor of Idaho; 1998, 2002	Succeeded by Butch Otter
U.S. Senate
Preceded by Steve Symms	U.S. Senator (Class 3) from Idaho; 1993–1999; Served alongside: Larry Craig	Succeeded by Mike Crapo
