= Rex Rammell =

American activist, politician and veterinarian

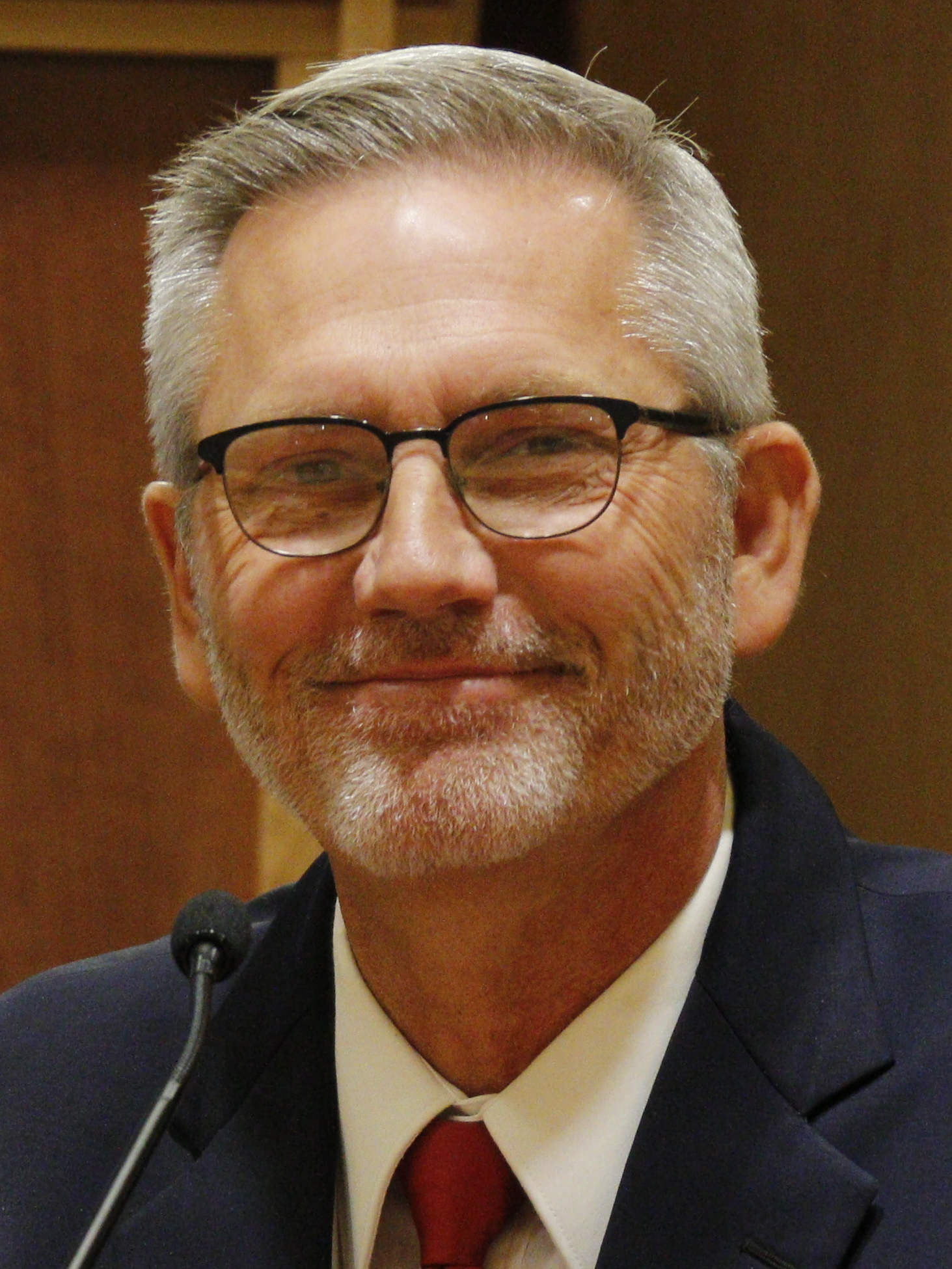
- Rammell in 2018
- Born: Rex Floyd Rammell; January 2, 1961 (age 65); Tetonia, Idaho, U.S.
- Occupation: Veterinarian
- Political party: Republican
- Other political affiliations: Independent (Note: Ran as an independent in the 2008 Idaho Senate Race)
- Spouse: Lynda Rammell (1983–present)
- Children: 4 (including Amanda)
- Website: Official website

Rex Floyd Rammell (born January 2, 1961) is an American veterinarian and perennial candidate for public office in Idaho and Wyoming.

== Early life ==
Rammell was born on January 2, 1961, in Tetonia, Idaho and was raised in Eastern Idaho.

== Career ==
Rammell is a veterinarian, former elk rancher and author of the recently released book titled, "A Nation Divided: The War For America's Soul".

== Political Campaigns ==
Rammell is a perennial candidate for public office in Idaho and Wyoming.

=== Idaho Elections ===
He ran unsuccessfully in the 2008 Idaho senatorial election against Incumbent Republican U.S. Senator Jim Risch, polling 5.4% of the vote.

In 2009 announced that he would seek the Republican nomination for governor in the 2010 Idaho gubernatorial election. He came in second to incumbent governor Butch Otter, polling 42,436 (26%) to Otter's 89,117 (54.6%). Rammell defeated Otter in two counties and tied him in another. Rammell's top county was Benewah where he polled nearly 58% of the vote to Otter's 33%. Rammell's number two county was Idaho County where he polled 46% to Otter's 40%. Both candidates polled 43% in Boundary County, with Otter receiving two votes more than Rammell.

In 2012, Rammell ran in the Republican primary for District 7 in the Idaho House of Representatives, but came in second place out of 3 candidates with 30.3% of the vote.

=== Wyoming Elections ===
In 2016, Rammell ran for United States Congress in the State of Wyoming as a Republican and took 7th place, losing to Liz Cheney.

In 2018, Rammell ran for Governor of Wyoming in 2018 as a Constitution Party candidate and took 3rd, losing to Mark Gordon.

In 2021, Rammell announced that he would seek the Republican nomination for Governor of Wyoming against Mark Gordon.

=== Elections ===
District 34 House Seat A - Madison County and part of Fremont County
Year	Candidate	Votes	Pct	Candidate	Votes	Pct	Candidate	Votes	Pct	Candidate	Votes	Pct	Candidate	Votes	Pct
2002 Primary	Rex; Rammell	835	14.6%	Mack; Shirley	2,210	38.8%	Diana; Richman	1,133	19.9%	Lynn; Loosli	964	16.9%	Max; Mortensen (inc.)	559	9.8%
2004 Primary	Rex; Rammell	2,814	35.7%	Mack; Shirley (inc.)	5,064	64.3%									

U.S. Senate election in Idaho, 2008
Party	Candidate	Votes	%	+%
Republican	Jim Risch	371,744	57.7%	
Democratic	Larry LaRocco	219,903	34.1%	
Independent	Rex Rammell	34,510	5.4%	
Libertarian	Kent Marmon	9,958	1.5%	
Independent	Pro-Life	8,662	1.3%	

Idaho Gubernatorial Republican primary election, 2010
Party	Candidate	Votes	%
Republican	Butch Otter (inc.)	89,117	54.6%
Republican	Rex Rammell	42,436	26.0%
Republican	Sharon M. Ullman	13,749	8.4%
Republican	Ron "Pete" Peterson	8,402	5.2%
Republican	Walt Bayes	4,825	3.0%
Republican	Tamara Wells	4,544	2.8%
Republican	Fred Nichols (write-in)	38	0.0%

District 7 Seat A - Clearwater, Idaho, and Shoshone Counties and part of Bonner County.
Year	Candidate	Votes	Pct	Candidate	Votes	Pct	Candidate	Votes	Pct
2012 Primary	Rex Rammell	1,625	30.3%	Shannon McMillan (inc.)	2,564	47.8%	Ed Galloway	1,178	21.9%

U.S. House of Representatives Wyoming At-large District Republican Primary Election, 2016
Party	Candidate	Votes	%
Republican	Liz Cheney	35,043	38.78
Republican	Leland Christensen	19,330	21.39
Republican	Tim Stubson	15,524	17.18
Republican	Darin Smith	13,381	14.81
Republican	Mike Konsmo	1,363	1.51
Republican	Jason Senteney	976	1.08
Republican	Rex Rammell	890	0.98
Republican	Paul Paad	886	0.98
Republican	Heath Beaudry	534	0.59
Write-ins	Others	155	0.17
	Undervote	1,651	1.83
	Overvote	625	0.69
Total votes		90,358	100

Wyoming gubernatorial election, 2018
Party	Candidate	Votes	%	±%
Republican	Mark Gordon	136,412	67.12%	+7.73%
Democratic	Mary Throne	55,965	27.54%	+0.29%
Constitution	Rex Rammell	6,751	3.32%	N/A
Libertarian	Lawrence Struempf	3,010	1.48%	−0.93%
Write-in		1,100	0.54%	-4.52%
Total votes		203,238	100.0%	N/A

Wyoming Gubernatorial Republican primary results, 2022
Party	Candidate	Votes	%
Republican	Mark Gordon (incumbent)	101,092	61.7
Republican	Brent Bien	48,549	29.7
Republican	Rex Rammell	9,373	5.7
Republican	James Scott Quick	4,725	2.9
Total votes		163,739	100.0

== Controversies ==
=== Obama threats ===
In August 2009, while at a town hall meeting opposing proposed national health care legislation, Rammell was briefly involved in a controversy when it was reported that he had joked about seeking a license to hunt President Barack Obama. The controversy stemmed from an event that Rammell had attended in Twin Falls, Idaho where he was speaking to a group of sportsmen about the upcoming wolf hunt when a woman in the audience asked, "what about Obama tags?" Rammell replied in jest, "yeah, we'd buy some of those." Rammell later apologized for his actions.

Constitution to "Hang by a Thread" in the last days

In January 2010, Rammell faced controversy when he invited friends of his to a meeting to discuss a prophecy of Joseph Smith which purportedly stated that the Constitution would "hang by a thread" in the last days before the elders of the Church of Jesus Christ of Latter-day Saints (LDS Church) would save it. Rammell had never mentioned the so-called White Horse Prophecy but mentioned the alleged quote by Joseph Smith in an effort to resonate Rammell's perceived seriousness of the political climate to fellow members of his church. The LDS Church disavowed these meetings, and Rammell later apologized for not making them public.

== Legal issues ==
=== Elk Hunt ===
In August 2006, nearly 160 elk escaped from Rammell's Chief Joseph hunting preserve just ten miles outside of Yellowstone National Park. In September 2006, facing pressure from anti game farming advocates, Idaho Governor Jim Risch ordered an emergency hunt to kill the loose elk from Rammell's ranch.

In September 2006, Rammell was charged with obstructing a police officer after he refused to get off a dead elk that had been killed by authorities. Rammell was upset that the Fish and Game officer had killed his elk right in front of his capture pen. Following a 12 hours trial, he was acquitted by a six-person jury in Fremont County, Idaho in March 2007.

When Rammell's daughter won the Miss Idaho USA pageant in 2007, she caused controversy by refusing to have her picture taken with Risch because of Risch's executive order that allowed the killing of Rammell's elk. Later, Governor Risch refused to apologize for his actions.

=== Illegal elk kill ===
On November 30, 2010, Rammell was cited by the Idaho Department of Fish and Game after he killed a cow elk in the wrong hunting zone.

On December 23, 2010, Rammell pleaded not guilty to charges of possessing wildlife taken unlawfully. Prior to trial, Rammell handed out literature from the "Fully Informed Jury" website to all jurists that day describing their rights as jurists. He was then arrested again for felony jury tampering which was later reduced to Contempt of Court and was given a withheld judgement, meaning it would not recorded on his record.

Rammel was found guilty of the wildlife charge in July 2011. He appealed using the defense that he did not have criminal intent and had only made a simple mistake, citing an Idaho law that stated a person could not be held to a crime if the alleged crime was committed by mistake. The conviction was upheld in the Idaho Appellate court.

=== Defies authorities ===
On December 15, 2010, at a town hall meeting held in Idaho County, Idaho, Rammell encouraged a crowd of about 100 supporters to defy Federal authorities by killing wolves while at the same time being careful not to face federal penalties.

=== Branding Inspections ===
In May 2021, Rammell was found guilty for not having proper brand inspections for four horses and a colt.

== Personal life ==
Rammell has been married to his wife Lynda since 1983 and they have four children; the eldest, Amanda, was Miss Idaho USA in 2007.

He is a member of the Church of Jesus Christ of Latter-day Saints.

Rammell announced on June 14, 2012, that his family was moving from Rexburg, Idaho to Torrington, Wyoming, so that he could take a veterinarian job.
