= Burtch =

Burtch is a surname. Notable people with the surname include:

- Albert Burtch (1804–1888), American politician from Wisconsin, father of Henry S.
- Charles Burtch (1893–1972), American politician from Iowa
- Henry S. Burtch (1837–1926), American politician in Wisconsin and Nebraska, son of Albert
- Jack Burtch (1926–2015), American lawyer and politician from Washington
- Mervyn Burtch (1929–2015), Welsh composer
