= Ohlin H. Adsit =

American politician (1855–1909)

3rd Mayor of Juneau, Alaska
- In office 1902–1904
- Preceded by: George Forrest
- Succeeded by: George Forrest

Personal details
- Born: Ohlin Harrison Adsit; August 1855 New York, U.S.
- Died: August 8, 1909 (aged 53–54) Seattle, Washington, U.S.
- Occupation: Politician, broker

Ohlin Harrison Adsit (August 1855 – August 8, 1909) was an Alaskan broker and politician, including serving as Mayor of Juneau from 1902 to 1904.

== Biography ==
He was born in August 1855 in New York. Adsit came to Alaska, originally seeking success during the Klondike Gold Rush of the late 1890s.

He was the plaintiff in Malony v. Adsit, a United States Supreme Court case involving a dispute of the ownership of a tract of land in the townsite of Juneau between Adsit and John F. Malony. The case, originally tried before Judge Arthur K. Delaney (who would later precede Adsit as mayor of Juneau) on August 10, 1897, was ruled in favor of Adsit. Malony appealed the result, bringing the case to the Supreme Court.

Adsit visited Portland, Oregon, in 1901.

He served as Mayor of Juneau from 1902 to 1904.

He died on August 8, 1909, in Seattle, Washington.
