= Senator Derr =

Senator Derr may refer to:

- Alfred M. Derr (1903–1970), Idaho State Senate
- Hattie Derr (1905–1994), Idaho State Senate
- John W. Derr (born 1941), Maryland State Senate
