= Melvin Wulf =

American lawyer (1927–2023)

Melvin Lawrence Wulf (November 1, 1927 – July 8, 2023) was an American constitutional lawyer. He was the legal director of the American Civil Liberties Union from 1962 to 1977. He was known for his advocacy in favor of gender equality, Vietnam War objectors, the fight against government censorship, and the Civil rights movement.

== Early life ==
Wulf was born in Brooklyn, NY, the younger of two children. His father, Jack, was a Jewish immigrant from Latvia, while his mother, Vivian (née Hurwitz) was the daughter of immigrants. When Wulf was eight the family relocated to Troy, NY, where his father owned a men's clothing factory.

In 1945, Wulf graduated from high school and enrolled at the New York State Maritime Academy. In 1947, intending to enter the family business, he began attending the Lowell Textile Institute in Lowell, Massachusetts; after three years, however, he transferred to Columbia University, citing the influence of a friend who "turned him on to politics." He received his bachelor's degree in 1952, and his law degree from Columbia Law School in 1955. Following his graduation, Wulf served for two years as a legal officer in the Navy.

== Career ==
=== Career beginnings ===
In 1958, the ACLU hired Wulf as an assistant to legal director Rowland Watts. Following Watts' departure in 1962, the ACLU promoted Wulf to legal director.

=== Civil rights ===
Wulf was active in the Civil rights movement of the 1960s. He played a key role in organizing the Lawyer's Constitutional Defense Committee (LCDC), a coalition of legal groups that recruited volunteers to provide legal aid to those attempting to register Black voters during the Freedom Summer. In addition to the ACLU, the LCDC included founding members from the NAACP Legal Defense and Education Fund, the American Jewish Committee, the Student Nonviolent Coordinating Committee (SNCC), the American Jewish Congress, the National Council of Churches' Commission on Race and Religion, and the Congress of Racial Equality (CORE).

In 1964, Wulf recruited civil rights lawyer Charles Morgan Jr. to open the ACLU's Southern Regional Office in Atlanta, Georgia. The office's major initiatives included Operation Southern Justice, which advocated to desegregate the Southern justice system, and the ACLU Voting Rights Project.

=== Transition to client representation & Vietnam War objectors ===
During his tenure at the ACLU, Wulf pushed the organization to take a more active role in the courtroom, advocating for direct client representation where the organization had previously only filed amicus briefs. A notable development in this advocacy was the case of Dr. Benjamin Spock, a prominent pediatrician and one of five men (the "Boston Five") federally indicted in 1968 for conspiring to counsel evasion of the Vietnam draft. Following the indictment, Wulf announced that the ACLU would represent the defendants free of charge. However, hesitant to question the legality of the war, the ACLU national board voted not to represent Spock and co-defendants. It later reversed its decision, offering the Boston Five legal support, though by this time months had passed and the ACLU's support was no longer necessary.

Later that year, Wulf defended Vietnam War objector James Oestereich before the Supreme Court. Oestereich's educational status exempted him from service, but after he returned his registration certificate as a form of antiwar protest, he received a delinquency notice and was reclassified as I-A. In Oestereich v. Selective Service, Wulf successfully argued that Congress had not authorized the Selective Service to withdraw an exemption merely because a draftee had returned his registration certificate.

=== Gender equality ===
In 1960 Wulf defended the use of contraceptives when he contributed to the ACLU's amicus brief in Poe v. Ullman. Co-authored with lawyer Ruth Emerson, the brief expanded the concept of right to privacy under the Due Process Clause of the Fourteenth Amendment. Although the case was unsuccessful on procedural grounds, Justice Harlan's dissent discussing the Due Process Clause was quoted by the Supreme Court in the 1973 decision in Roe v. Wade. The Supreme Court ultimately held that the Constitution protects the right to contraceptives four years after Poe v. Ullman, in Griswold v. Connecticut.

In the early 1970s, Wulf collaborated with future Supreme Court justice Ruth Bader Ginsburg on two significant cases regarding sex-based discrimination: Moritz v. Commissioner and Reed v. Reed. In the first case, the IRS had denied a tax deduction to Charles Moritz for expenses for the care of his dependent invalid mother, on the grounds that he was not a woman and had never married. In the fall of 1970, Ginsburg, then a Rutgers Law School professor, asked Wulf to provide ACLU support and funding to appeal the Tax Court's affirmation of the IRS position. Wulf agreed, and Ginsburg and her husband Martin took the case to the 10th Circuit Court of Appeals.

In the second case, Sally Reed and her ex-husband Cecil each petitioned to be administrator of their son's estate following his death by suicide. The probate court selected Cecil in accordance with Idaho state law, which specified that "As between persons equally entitled to administer a decedent’s estate, males must be preferred to females." After the Idaho Supreme Court sustained the probate court's judgment, Wulf filed a request for the United States Supreme Court to review the case, and accepted Ginsburg's offer to co-write the appellant's brief.

In 1971, the Supreme Court reversed the Idaho Supreme Court's decision. For the first time ever, the Court used the Equal Protection Clause of the Fourteenth Amendment to strike down legislation that discriminated against women. The following year, the 10th Circuit Court of Appeals reversed the Tax Court's decision to deny Charles Moritz his deduction, citing Reed v. Reed.

Wulf was also key in establishing the ACLU's Women's Rights Project, which hired Ginsburg and lawyer Brenda Feigen as its first co-directors in 1972.

=== CIA dissidents ===
Wulf represented the authors of two high-profile books about clandestine CIA activity. In 1973, the CIA attempted to censor 339 passages in The CIA and the Cult of Intelligence, a critique of the organization written by former CIA employee Victor Marchetti and former State Department officer John D. Marks. Wulf and his clients argued each of the deletions with the CIA, ultimately negotiating the restoration of 171 passages. The remaining 168 censored passages were published as blank sections.

Wulf also represented former CIA case officer Philip Agee, who had identified roughly 250 agency operatives in his 1975 book Inside the Company: CIA Diary. In 1979, Agee's passport was revoked on the ground that his activities abroad were a threat to national security. Wulf defended Agee before the Supreme Court in Haig v. Agee (1981), but the Court ultimately ruled against him.

=== Departure from ACLU ===
Wulf departed the ACLU in 1977. In a statement to the New York Times, Wulf alluded to "irreconcilable differences which were the basis for my forced resignation."

=== Later work ===
Following Wulf's departure from the ACLU, he formed a law firm with Alan Levine, a former ACLU colleague, and Ramsey Clark, the former U.S. Attorney General. The firm challenged book-banning before the Supreme Court, defended two authors against libel charges from the Church of Scientology, and represented such clients as Philip Agee and Frank Serpico. However, its civil liberties focus and significant amount of pro bono work rendered it financially unsustainable, and it was forced to close in 1983.

That same year, Wulf moved to Beldock Levine & Hoffman, a law firm specializing in civil rights, freedom of speech, and employment law. Wulf also represented clients in copyright matters. He remained there until his retirement in 2009.

== Personal life ==
Wulf married Deirdre Howard on December 18, 1962. They had two daughters.

== Supreme Court cases argued ==
- Fields v. Fairfield (1963)
- Wainwright v. City of New Orleans (1968)
- Oestereich v. Selective Service System Local Board No. 11 (1968)
- In re Spencer (1970)
- Healy v. James (1972)
- Davis v. United States (1973)
- Bigelow v. Virginia (1975)
- Stafford v. Briggs (1980)
- Haig v. Agee (1981)

== In popular culture ==
Wulf was portrayed by Justin Theroux in On the Basis of Sex, a 2018 biographical film about Ruth Bader Ginsburg.
