= Gerald Gunther =

American legal scholar (1927–2002)

- Born: May 26, 1927; Usingen, Germany
- Died: July 30, 2002 (aged 75); Stanford, California, U.S.

Academic background
- Education: Brooklyn College (BA); Columbia University (MA); Harvard University (LLB)

Academic work
- Discipline: Constitutional law
- Institutions: Stanford Law School

Gerald Gunther (May 26, 1927 – July 30, 2002) was a German-born American constitutional law scholar and a professor of law at Stanford Law School from 1962 until his death in 2002. Gunther was among the twenty most widely cited legal scholars of the 20th century, and his 1972 Harvard Law Review article, "The Supreme Court, 1971 Term Foreword: In Search of Evolving Doctrine on a Changing Court: A Model for a Newer Equal Protection," is the fourth most-cited law review article of all time. Gunther's casebook, Constitutional Law, originally published in 1965, is one of the most widely used constitutional law textbook in American law schools.

== Early life and education ==
Gerald Gunther was born on May 26, 1927, in Usingen im Taunus, Germany, where his family had worked as butchers for over three centuries. Gunther entered primary school during the same year in which Adolf Hitler gained power. In school, Gunther experienced virulent anti-Semitism; a Nazi schoolteacher labelled Gunther "Jew-pig" and segregated him from his classmates. Though initially hesitant to leave Germany, Gunther's family fled for the United States in 1938, only a few hours after witnessing the destruction of their town synagogue. Upon arriving in America, Gunther's family settled in Brooklyn, New York.

Gunther attended Brooklyn College, where he graduated with a Bachelor of Arts in 1949. He then received an M.A. in public law and government from Columbia University in 1950 and an LL.B., magna cum laude, from Harvard Law School, where he was an editor of the Harvard Law Review, in 1953.

== Career ==
From 1953 to 1954, following his graduation from Harvard, Gunther clerked for Judge Learned Hand of the United States Court of Appeals for the Second Circuit, and from 1954 to 1955, for Chief Justice Earl Warren of the United States Supreme Court. As later revealed by Warren, Gunther played a central role in the writing of the Court's landmark ruling in Brown v. Board of Education (II).

After a year in private practice at a Wall Street law firm, Gunther joined the faculty of Columbia Law School in 1956. At Columbia, Gunther mentored future Associate Justice of the Supreme Court Ruth Bader Ginsburg, who graduated from Columbia Law School in 1959. According to Ginsburg, Gunther helped to secure her clerkship with Judge Edmund L. Palmieri of the United States District Court for the Southern District of New York "by pressuring every judge in the Southern District" to hire her. Gunther also advised Ginsburg on how to broaden constitutional protections to women when she was a lawyer with the American Civil Liberties Union, And in July 1993, Gunther testified for Ginsburg at her Senate confirmation hearings.

In 1962, Gunther left Columbia for Stanford Law School, where he became the William Nelson Cromwell Professor of Law in 1972, taking emeritus status in 1995 (though he continued to teach until his death). At Stanford, Gunther, who was motivated by his childhood experiences in Nazi Germany, became an outspoken defender of civil liberties, particularly the right to freedom of speech. In 1976, Gunther famously defended the freedom of speech rights of American Nazis, And in 1988, Gunther opposed a Stanford University ban on expressions of racial or religious intolerance. Recalling his own experiences with anti-Semitism, Gunther spoke of "the need to walk the sometimes difficult path of denouncing the bigot’s hateful ideas with all my power, yet at the same time challenging any community’s attempt to suppress hateful ideas by force of law."

In addition to his prolific scholarship on constitutional law, first amendment law, and the U.S. Supreme Court, Gunther spent 22 years researching and writing his influential 818-page biography of Judge Learned Hand, titled Learned Hand: The Man and the Judge. Gunther's biography earned him numerous awards, including the Triennial Book Award of the Order of the Coif and the Erwin N. Griswold Triennial Prize from the Supreme Court Historical Society.

Gunther was ultimately awarded five honorary degrees, as well as the Learned Hand Medal for Excellence in Federal Jurisprudence from the Federal Bar Council in 1988, the Richard J. Maloney Prize for Distinguished Contributions to Legal Education from the Order of the Coif in 1990, and the Bernard E. Witkin Medal from the State Bar of California in 1995. In 1987, in a survey of lawyers conducted by the National Law Journal, Gunther was voted as the most qualified candidate for the United States Supreme Court. He was a member of both the American Academy of Arts and Sciences and the American Philosophical Society.

Gunther is played by Ronald Guttman in the film On the Basis of Sex (2018). The scene has Gunther playing a Tenth Circuit judge in a moot court to prepare Ruth Bader Ginsburg for an oral argument in Moritz v. Commissioner.

== See also ==
- List of law clerks for the chief justice of the United States
