= Patrick McDonald (politician) =

American politician from Idaho

Member of the Idaho House of Representatives from District 15 Seat B
- In office January 14, 2014 – November 30, 2018
- Preceded by: Mark Patterson
- Succeeded by: Jake Ellis

Personal details
- Born: Salt Lake City, Utah
- Party: Republican
- Spouse: Sarah Jane
- Children: 3
- Education: Idaho State University
- Profession: retired law enforcement officer

Patrick McDonald was a Republican member of the Idaho House of Representatives, representing the Boise-based District 15 from January 2014 to January 2019. He was appointed to the position by Governor Butch Otter to serve the remainder of the term of Mark Patterson, who resigned due to scandal regarding his past criminal record.

== Background ==
McDonald served as an officer with the Idaho State Police for 33 years, concluding his tenure as a regional patrol commander. He also served as a United States Marshal for Idaho during the George W. Bush administration.

== Elections ==
District 15 House Seat B - Part of Ada County
Year	Candidate	Votes	Pct	Candidate	Votes	Pct
2014 Primary	Patrick McDonald (incumbent)	1,978	65.2%	Jason Robinson	1,058	34.8%
2014 General	Patrick McDonald (incumbent)	7,045	56.8%	John Hart	5,358	43.2%
2016 Primary	Patrick McDonald (incumbent)	1,418	57.9%	Rod Beck	1,029	42.1%
2016 General	Patrick McDonald (incumbent)	10,506	56.2%	Jake Ellis	8,194	43.8%
2018 Primary	Patrick McDonald (incumbent)	3,630	100%			
2018 General	Patrick McDonald (incumbent)	8,769	49.1%	Jake Ellis	9,089	50.9%

District 15 House Seat A - Part of Ada County
Year	Candidate	Votes	Pct	Candidate	Votes	Pct	Candidate	Votes	Pct
2020 Primary	Patrick McDonald	3,960	100%						
2020 General	Patrick McDonald	10,933	47.8%	Steve Berch (incumbent)	11,567	50.6%	David W. Hartigan	365	1.6%
