= On the Basis of Sex =

2018 film by Mimi Leder

- Theatrical release poster
- Directed by: Mimi Leder
- Written by: Daniel Stiepleman
- Produced by: Robert W. Cort
- Starring: Felicity Jones; Armie Hammer; Justin Theroux; Sam Waterston; Kathy Bates
- Cinematography: Michael Grady
- Edited by: Michelle Tesoro
- Music by: Mychael Danna
- Production companies: Focus Features; Participant Media; Robert Cort Productions; Alibaba Pictures
- Distributed by: Focus Features
- Release dates: November 8, 2018 (AFI Fest); December 25, 2018 (United States)
- Running time: 120 minutes
- Country: United States
- Language: English
- Budget: $20 million
- Box office: $38.8 million

On the Basis of Sex is a 2018 American biographical legal drama film based on the life and early cases of Ruth Bader Ginsburg, who was the second woman to serve as an Associate Justice of the United States Supreme Court. Directed by Mimi Leder and written by Daniel Stiepleman (Ginsburg's real-life nephew), it stars Felicity Jones as Ginsburg. Armie Hammer, Justin Theroux, Jack Reynor, Cailee Spaeny, Sam Waterston, and Kathy Bates feature in supporting roles.

The film had its world premiere at the AFI Fest on November 8, 2018, and was theatrically released in the United States on December 25, 2018, by Focus Features. On the Basis of Sex received generally favorable reviews from critics, who praised Jones' performance, the film's intricacy and its pacing at a dramatic level. Other critics felt the biopic was predictable, over-packaged and hagiographic. Made on a $20 million budget, On the Basis of Sex grossed $38.8 million at the box office.

== Plot ==
In 1956, Ruth Bader Ginsburg is a first-year student at Harvard Law School. Her husband Martin Ginsburg, a second-year student, is diagnosed with testicular cancer. She attends both her classes and his, taking notes and transcribing lectures while caring for Martin and their infant daughter Jane. Two years later, Martin's cancer is in remission. He is hired by a New York City firm. Citing precedent, Ruth petitions to complete her Harvard degree at Columbia Law School, but Dean Erwin Griswold denies her. Nevertheless, she transfers and graduates top of her class. However, a dozen law firms deny a position based on her gender. She settles for professorship at Rutgers Law School, teaching "Sex Discrimination and the Law", describing Hoyt v. Florida.

In 1970, Martin presents a tax law case to Ruth's – Charles Moritz, from Denver, hired a nurse for his mother so he could continue working, but was denied a tax deduction under Section 214 of the Internal Revenue Code, limiting deductions to "a woman, a widower or divorcée, or a husband whose wife is incapacitated or institutionalized." Since Moritz never married, he was disqualified. Ruth seizes the opportunity to challenge many such laws that assume men are breadwinners, while women remain housewives. She intends to set a precedent ruling that a man was discriminated against on the basis of sex, which could subsequently be cited to challenge discriminatory laws against women – and an appellate court of male judges would more easily identify with a male appellant.

Ruth tries enlisting Mel Wulf of the ACLU, who turns her down. Convinced that millions of people could benefit, Moritz agrees to allow Ruth to represent him pro bono. After reading Ruth's brief, Dorothy Kenyon convinces Wulf to help. They file an appeal with the Tenth Circuit Court of Appeals. Department of Justice Attorney James H. Bozarth asks to be the lead counsel for the defense. Bozarth does a computer search to find all of the sections of the US Code that deal with sex. His defense will contend that, if section 214 is ruled unconstitutional, all of America's sex-based laws will be challenged. Ruth, having no courtroom experience, argues poorly in moot court. Wulf convinces her to let Martin lead off arguing the tax law, with Ruth following up with equal protection arguments.

The government, represented by Professor Ernest Brown and Griswold, offers Moritz a settlement of one dollar. Ruth counter-proposes they pay Moritz' entire deduction claim, declare no wrong-doing, and record, as unconstitutional, the sex-based portion of section 214. Brown and Griswold decline. During oral argument at the Court of Appeals, Martin spends more of their thirty minutes than intended. Nervously, Ruth makes several key points, reserving four minutes for rebuttal. Bozarth frames his argument as defending the American way of life, implying that the Ginsburgs and ACLU want "radical social change" and suggests Moritz "just doesn't want to pay his taxes". Ruth confidently rebuts, those societal roles extant one hundred, or just twenty, years ago, no longer apply. She does not ask the court to change society, but for the law to keep up with societal changes that have already taken place. Judge William Edward Doyle objects that the Constitution does not contain the word "woman" Ruth retorts, neither does it contain the word "freedom". (Note: "Freedom" is not in the body of the Constitution text itself, but is, rather, within the First Amendment ("Freedom of speech, or of the press").) While judgment is reserved, Wulf, Moritz, and the Ginsburgs celebrate that Ruth finally found her voice as a lawyer.

Epilogue : Denver's Court of Appeals unanimously reverses the Tax Court's decision, concluding that Moritz was entitled to the caregiver's deduction. Moritz v. Commissioner and Reed v. Reed become the first federal cases to declare discrimination on the basis of sex unconstitutional. Ruth co-founds the ACLU's Women's Rights Project, winning several landmark cases. Martin becomes a preeminent tax attorney and Georgetown professor. In 1980, Jane graduates Harvard Law School, later becoming a Columbia law professor. On June 14, 1993, the Senate (96–3) confirms Ruth's nomination to associate justice of the United States Supreme Court. In 2010, shortly after his fifty-sixth wedding anniversary, Martin dies of cancer. Presently : The real-life Ginsburg walks up the steps of the Supreme Court building.

== Cast ==
- Felicity Jones as Ruth Bader Ginsburg
- Armie Hammer as Martin D. Ginsburg
- Justin Theroux as Melvin "Mel" Wulf
- Jack Reynor as James H. Bozarth
- Cailee Spaeny as Jane C. Ginsburg
- Stephen Root as Professor Ernest Brown
- Sam Waterston as Erwin Griswold
- Kathy Bates as Dorothy Kenyon
- Wendy Crewson as Harriet Griswold
- Chris Mulkey as Charles Moritz
- John Ralston as Tom Miller
- Gary Werntz as Judge William Edward Doyle
- Francis X. McCarthy as Judge Frederick Alvin Daugherty
- Ben Carlson as Judge William Judson Holloway Jr.
- Ronald Guttman as Professor Gerald Gunther
- Arthur Holden as Dr. Wyland Leadbetter
- Angela Galuppo as Emily Hicks
- Callum Shoniker as James Steven Ginsburg
- Sharon Washington as Pauli Murray
- Holly Gauthier-Frankel as Millicent
- Tom Irwin as Greene
- Ruth Bader Ginsburg as Herself (uncredited)

== Production ==
Robert W. Cort produced the film through Participant Media. On July 18, 2017, Deadline reported that the film would be directed by Mimi Leder. Production started in late 2017 in Montreal Quebec, and the cast was rounded out by Justin Theroux, Kathy Bates, Sam Waterston, Jack Reynor, Stephen Root, and Cailee Spaeny in October as filming commenced.

=== Writing ===
The film's script, written by Daniel Stiepleman who is Ginsburg's nephew, had made the 2014 blacklist of the best unproduced screenplays of the year.

=== Casting ===
Natalie Portman had previously been linked to the role of Ginsburg. On July 18, 2017, Deadline reported that Jones would play the role of Ginsburg in the film. On September 7, 2017, Hammer was cast to play Ruth's husband Martin. The cast was completed by Justin Theroux, Kathy Bates, Sam Waterston, Jack Reynor, Stephen Root and Cailee Spaeny in October as filming commenced. In April 2018, it was announced that Ginsburg would appear in a small role.

=== Music ===
On September 21, 2018, pop rap recording artist Kesha released the song "Here Comes the Change" as a standalone single, however it was not included in the film's soundtrack.

Mychael Danna composed the film score. Sony Classical Records released the soundtrack on December 14, 2018.

== Release ==
The film was scheduled to be released by Focus Features on November 9, 2018, but was pushed back to a limited release on December 25, 2018, with a wide release on January 11, 2019. It had its world premiere at the AFI Fest on November 8, 2018.

On the Basis of Sex was released on digital platforms on March 26, 2019, followed by a release on DVD and Blu-ray on April 9, 2019.

=== Marketing ===
The first trailer for the film debuted on July 16, 2018. The trailer was criticized for a scene in which Ginsburg tells a judge that the word "freedom" does not appear in the United States Constitution; it appears in the First Amendment. Screenwriter Daniel Stiepleman, in response to the criticism, stated that the point of the dialogue was to show that the Constitution, like the country as a whole, was always open to improvement.

== Reception ==
=== Box office ===
On the Basis of Sex grossed $24.6 million in the United States and Canada, and $14.1 million in other territories, for a total worldwide gross of $38.7 million.

The film grossed a "solid" $442,000 from 33 theaters on its first day of release, December 25. It went on to gross $690,000 in its first weekend, a total of $1.5 million over its first six days. During January 11–13, its first weekend of wide release, the film made $6.2 million from 1,923 theaters, finishing sixth at the box office. In its second weekend of wide release, the film fell 35% to $4 million, finishing 10th.

=== Critical response ===
On the review aggregator website Rotten Tomatoes, the film holds an approval rating of 72% based on 265 reviews, with an average of 6.4/10. The website's critical consensus reads, "On the Basis of Sex is nowhere near as groundbreaking as its real-life subject, but her extraordinary life makes a solid case for itself as an inspirational, well-acted biopic." On Metacritic, the film has a weighted average score of 59 out of 100, based on 40 critics, indicating "mixed or average reviews". Audiences polled by CinemaScore gave the film an average grade of "A" on an A+ to F scale, while PostTrak reported filmgoers gave it an overall positive score of 94% and a "definite recommend" of 62%.

Michael O'Sullivan of The Washington Post stated "that the movie is something of a cinematic Reese's Peanut Butter Cup. Armie Hammer, 32, who plays Marty, calls attention to the film's split personality, citing, on the one hand, its focus on the Ginsburgs' 'amazing partnership' and, on the other, its stuffier theme of public policy: 'How a government taxes its citizens,' Hammer says, with the cadence of the attorney he plays, 'is a direct representation of how that government views its people.'" A. O. Scott of The New York Times noted that the film stays close to the true story of Ginsburg's emergence as a leading women's rights attorney: "That the movie may leave you wanting more — more history, more personality, more complicated emotion, more ideological contention — doesn't necessarily count against it. Historical narratives are best when they pique curiosity as well as satisfy it..."

=== "Jewface" criticism ===
In 2021, comedian Sarah Silverman criticized the casting of non-Jewish actresses as prominent Jewish women in Hollywood films, citing, amongst others, Jones' casting as Ginsburg in the film, calling it "Jewface". She further remarked: "If the Jewish female character is courageous or deserves love, she is never played by a Jew. Ever!"

=== Accolades ===
| Award | Date of ceremony | Category | Recipient(s) | Result | Ref. |
|---|---|---|---|---|---|
| Young Artist Awards | July 14, 2019 | Best Performance in a Feature Film: Supporting Young Actor | Callum Shoniker | Nominated | |
| Humanitas Prize | February 9, 2019 | Drama Feature Film | On the Basis of Sex | Won | |
| Cinema for Peace Awards | February 11, 2019 | Cinema for Peace Award for Women's Empowerment | On the Basis of Sex | Nominated | |
| Hollywood Music in Media Awards | November 14, 2018 | Original Song - Feature Film | "Here Comes The Change" - Kesha Sebert, Drew Pearson, & Stephen Wrabel | Nominated | |
| Heartland Film Festival | October 21, 2018 | Truly Moving Picture Award | On the Basis of Sex | Won | |
| Women's Image Network Awards | February 22, 2019 | Outstanding Actress Feature Film | Felicity Jones | Nominated | |
| Women's Image Network Awards | February 22, 2019 | Outstanding Feature Film | On the Basis of Sex | Won | |
| Women's Image Network Awards | February 22, 2019 | Outstanding Film Directed by a Woman | Mimi Leder | Nominated | |
| Women's Image Network Awards | February 22, 2019 | Supporting Actress Feature Film | Cailee Spaeny | Nominated | |
| Women's Image Network Awards | February 22, 2019 | Supporting Actress Feature Film | Kathy Bates | Nominated | |
| Women Film Critics Circle | December 11, 2018 | Best Equality of the Sexes | On the Basis of Sex | Nominated | |
| Women Film Critics Circle | December 11, 2018 | Karen Morley Award | On the Basis of Sex | Nominated | |
| AARP Movies for Grownups Awards | February 15, 2019 | Best Director | Mimi Leder | Nominated | |
| AARP Movies for Grownups Awards | February 15, 2019 | Best Grownup Love Story | Felicity Jones and Armie Hammer | Nominated | |
| Young Entertainer Awards | October 25, 2020 | Best Performance Young Actor - Feature Film | Callum Shoniker | Nominated | |
| ReFrame | March 6, 2019 | ReFrame Stamp - Feature | On the Basis of Sex | Won | |

== See also ==
- RBG (film), a biographical documentary focusing on the larger life and career of Ginsburg, also released in 2018.
