= Vernon K. Smith =

American politician (1913–1966)

Vernon K. Smith (c. 1913 – May 2, 1966) was a Democratic politician from Idaho. He was the Democratic nominee for Governor of Idaho in 1962. Smith was defeated by the Republican incumbent, Robert E. Smylie.

Smith was noted for his pro-gambling views, and ran on that platform in 1962.

He died at Boise of a heart attack in May 1966. He was 53.

Party political offices
Preceded by Alfred M. Derr	Democratic Party nominee, Governor of Idaho; 1962	Succeeded by Charles Herndon
