= Arthur Delaney (politician) =

19th century American politician

Arthur K. Delaney
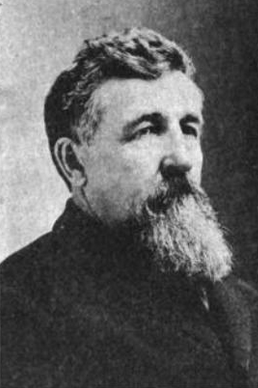
- Portrait from An Authentic History of the Benevolent and Protective Order of Elks (1910)

Judge of the United States Territorial Court for the District of Alaska
- In office December 10, 1895 – July 28, 1897
- Appointed by: Grover Cleveland
- Preceded by: Warren Truitt
- Succeeded by: Charles S. Johnson

1st Mayor of Juneau, Alaska
- In office April 1900 – April 1901
- Preceded by: John F. Malony (acting)
- Succeeded by: George Forrest

United States Attorney for the Eastern District of Wisconsin
- In office July 1885 – October 1887
- President: Grover Cleveland
- Preceded by: Gerry Whiting Hazelton
- Succeeded by: William A. Walker

Member of the Wisconsin Senate from the 13th district
- In office January 3, 1881 – January 1, 1883
- Preceded by: Edward C. McFetridge
- Succeeded by: Benjamin Sherman

Member of the Wisconsin State Assembly from the Dodge 3rd district
- In office January 4, 1869 – January 3, 1870
- Preceded by: Charles E. Goodwin
- Succeeded by: Henry S. Burtch

Personal details
- Born: January 10, 1841 Essex County, New York, U.S.
- Died: January 21, 1905 (aged 64) Paso Robles, California, U.S.
- Resting place: Evergreen Cemetery, Everett, Washington, U.S.
- Party: Democratic
- Spouse: Anna J. Walwork (m. 1865)
- Children: Katie B. (Abrams); Alma J.

Arthur K. Delaney (January 10, 1841 – January 21, 1905) was an American lawyer, Democratic politician, and pioneer of Wisconsin and Alaska. He was the first mayor of Juneau, Alaska, and was appointed United States District Judge for Alaska by President Grover Cleveland. Earlier in his career, he served as United States Attorney for the Eastern District of Wisconsin and represented Dodge County in the Wisconsin Legislature for three years.

== Early life and career ==
Arthur Delaney was born near Fort Ticonderoga, in Essex County, New York, in 1841. He came to the Wisconsin Territory with his parents when he was just four years old. They first settled at Kenosha, Wisconsin, (then Southport), but quickly relocated west to Rock County, then back east to Port Washington, where Delaney received his early education. His family moved to a farm in Dodge County, Wisconsin, in 1856, then into the city of Horicon, Wisconsin, where Delaney finished his education.

In 1861, the family moved again, to Sparta, Wisconsin, where Delaney began to study law at the office of Montgomery & Tyler. He returned to Horicon and completed his legal studies in the office of Amos J. Rising, who later became a justice of the Colorado Supreme Court. He was admitted to the bar in 1865 and served five years as clerk of Horicon, Wisconsin, during the 1860s.

In 1868, he was elected on the Democratic Party ticket to the Wisconsin State Assembly, representing Dodge County's 3rd Assembly district (the northeast part of the county).

He moved to Mayville, Wisconsin, in 1870, and taught school there. He moved to Hustisford, Wisconsin, in 1873, and established a law practice there, and was elected superintendent of schools for the eastern half of the county, serving six years. He returned to Mayville in 1877.

== Political career ==
Delaney was elected to the Wisconsin State Senate from Dodge County's Senate district in 1880. During the 1881 session of the legislature, Wisconsin's congressional apportionment grew from eight to nine seats. The Legislature in 1882 passed a new redistricting of the state.

Under the new map, Delaney's Dodge County was drawn into the new, heavily-Democratic 2nd congressional district. Over the next several election cycles, Delaney would famously engage in a bitter feud with fellow Democrat Edward S. Bragg over which of them would be nominated to serve in Congress. In 1882, Bragg was the incumbent congressman in the 5th congressional district, but now resided in the 2nd district due to redistricting. With the full support of the delegate-rich Dodge County, Delaney believed he was well on his way to securing the nomination. But he was unable to find the handful of additional votes to secure a majority. At the district convention, voting deadlocked at 14-14 for over 1600 ballots. In the end, neither man won the nomination. On the 1601st ballot, two Bragg delegates from Waukesha voted for the relatively unknown Waukesha lawyer Daniel H. Sumner as the nominee, all of the Delaney delegates then followed suit, delivering the nomination to Sumner.

Delaney and Bragg resumed their fight in the 1884 nominating contest. After two weeks and another 150 ballots, Bragg prevailed. It was later rumored that the two men had made a bargain which included a pledge from Bragg not to run again, and a pledge that Bragg would not interfere in the suggestion of nominees for political appointments in Dodge County in the event of a Democratic presidency.

Bragg went on to win the general election, and Grover Cleveland was elected president the same year. Shortly thereafter, President Cleveland appointed Delaney United States Attorney for the Eastern District of Wisconsin. This was seen as a ploy by Bragg to disqualify Delaney from pursuing the congressional office again. Delaney's appointment was broadly denounced by Republicans and Democrats around the state. He was described as an inexperienced country lawyer with an offensive ego.

The appointment did not dissuade Delaney from congressional aspirations, and he launched a campaign against Bragg in 1886 while still serving as U.S. attorney. Once again, the convention deadlocked for dozens of ballots. Finally, a delegate from Washington County switched his vote to Delaney, allowing him to secure a bare majority on the 216th ballot. After securing the nomination, Delaney resigned his office as U.S. attorney. At the culmination of his years-long campaign for Congress, Delaney was defeated in the general election by Republican Richard Guenther, who before that time was not even a resident of the 2nd congressional district. Guenther was assisted by a strong contingent of Democrats opposed to Delaney's election. Guenther served only one term and was the only Republican to win the seat under the 1882 maps.

== Move to Alaska ==
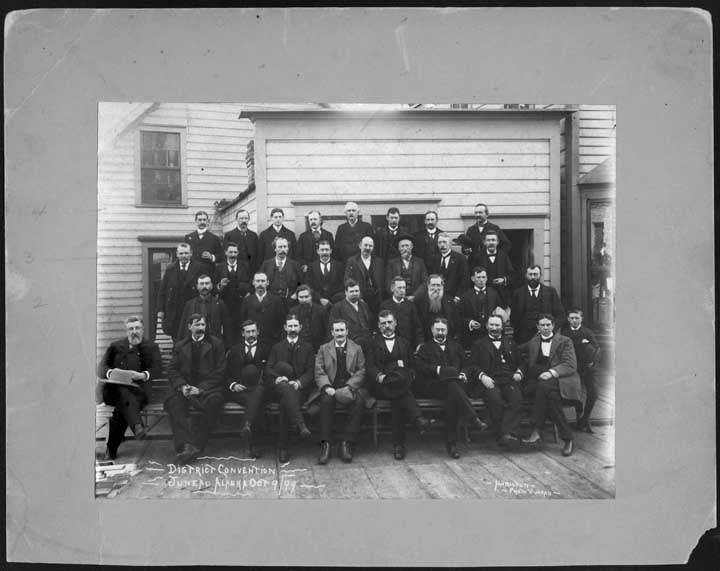
Juneau, Alaska District Convention, October 9, 1899; Delaney is at the far left in the front row.

Delaney's consolation after his defeat in 1886 was an appointment as collector of customs at the port of Sitka, in the District of Alaska. In 1889, President Cleveland left office and Delaney's political appointment expired. He moved to Juneau, Alaska, and began a law practice there.

Cleveland appointed Delaney United States District Judge for the District of Alaska on November 8, 1895. He was sworn in on December 10, 1895. In his roles as attorney, Delaney was a participant in Marks v. Shoup, a 1901 United States Supreme Court case. As judge, he presided over Malony v. Adsit, a case which would also make it to the U.S. Supreme Court, on August 10, 1897; Delaney ruled in favor of the plaintiff, O. H. Adsit, who would go on to be mayor of Juneau from 1902 to 1904. Delaney was removed from office by President William McKinley when he gave a recess appointment to Charles S. Johnson on July 28, 1897.

In 1900, Delaney was the first elected mayor of Juneau, serving until 1901.

He left Alaska in 1904, and settled for some time at Everett, Washington, before removing to California due to painful rheumatism. He died on January 21, 1905, in Paso Robles, California.

== Family ==
Arthur Delaney was the son of Reverend James Delaney, who worked for many years as a Baptist minister in various cities in Wisconsin. James Delaney had emigrated from Ireland after serving in the British Army in India.

Arthur Delaney married Anna J. Walwork of Horicon on March 23, 1865. They had two daughters. One daughter, Katherine Delaney Abrams, attained notoriety as an artist. His younger daughter, Alma, married George C. Teal, a successful salmon cannery operator in Alaska.

== Electoral history ==
=== Wisconsin Senate (1880) ===
Wisconsin Senate, 13th District Election, 1880
Party	Candidate	Votes	%	±%
General Election, November 2, 1880
Democratic	Arthur K. Delaney	5,605	57.99%	+17.83%
Republican	Eli Hawks	3,907	40.42%	−4.94%
Greenback	John Howard	153	1.58%	−12.89%
Plurality		1,698	17.57%	+12.37%
Total votes		9,665	100.0%	+27.56%
Democratic gain from Republican				

=== U.S. House of Representatives (1886) ===
Wisconsin's 2nd Congressional District Election, 1886
Party	Candidate	Votes	%	±%
General Election, November 2, 1886
Republican	Richard W. Guenther	15,366	55.67%	+14.12%
Democratic	Arthur K. Delaney	11,138	40.36%	−15.07%
Prohibition	J. L. Ingersoll	1,074	3.89%	+2.04%
	Scattering	22	0.08	
Plurality		4,228	15.32%	+1.44%
Total votes		27,600	100.0%	-9.30%
Republican gain from Democratic				

Wisconsin State Assembly
Preceded by Charles E. Goodwin	Member of the Wisconsin State Assembly from the Dodge 3rd district January 4, 1869 – January 3, 1870	Succeeded by Henry S. Burtch
Wisconsin Senate
Preceded by Edward C. McFetridge	Member of the Wisconsin Senate from the 13th district January 3, 1881 – January 1, 1883	Succeeded by Benjamin Sherman
Political offices
Preceded by John F. Malony (acting)	Mayor of Juneau, Alaska; April 1900 – April 1901	Succeeded by George Forrest
Legal offices
Preceded by Gerry Whiting Hazelton	United States Attorney for the Eastern District of Wisconsin; July 1885 – October 1887	Succeeded by William A. Walker
Preceded by Warren Truitt	United States Territorial District Judge for the District of Alaska; December 10, 1895 – July 28, 1897	Succeeded by Charles S. Johnson
