= James F. Ailshie =

American judge (1868–1947)

Justice of the Idaho Supreme Court
- In office 1935–1947
- Preceded by: Nicodemus D. Wernette
- Succeeded by: Paul W. Hyatt
- In office 1903–1914
- Preceded by: Ralph P. Quarles (1903)
- Succeeded by: Warren Truitt (1914)

Personal details
- Born: June 19, 1868 Greene County, Tennessee, U.S.
- Died: May 27, 1947 (aged 78) Boise, Idaho, U.S.
- Resting place: Cloverdale Memorial Park, Boise, Idaho; 43.616114°N 116.333311°W
- Party: Republican
- Spouse: Lucie Bundren
- Children: 4, including Robert
- Education: Willamette University (PhB) (LLB)

James F. Ailshie (June 19, 1868 – May 27, 1947) was an American attorney and jurist who served as a justice of the Idaho Supreme Court, alternating as chief justice with other members of the court. First elected to the court in 1902, he became the youngest chief justice in the United States at the time. During his 24 years on the court, Ailshie wrote more than 700 opinions. At the time of his death, only one opinion in which he participated had been reversed by the U.S. Supreme Court.

== Early life and education ==
James Franklin Ailshie was born June 19, 1868, in Greene County, Tennessee, to parents George Washington Ailshie and Martha A. (Knight) Ailshie. He was the eldest of nine children, and he attended public school in Greene County. He later attended Carson College in Jefferson City, leaving in his junior year. He briefly taught school in Hutton Valley, Missouri, and in 1888 he moved to Spokane, Washington, then to Rockford where he was a school principal.

In 1889, Ailshie entered Willamette University in Salem, Oregon, graduating in 1891 with a Ph.B. in philosophy and an LL.B. in law. He was admitted to practice law in Oregon, but he settled in north central Idaho at Grangeville, opening his practice in August 1891.

== Career ==
Ailshie served as a regent of the University of Idaho from 1893 to 1896. He was elected to the Idaho Supreme Court for a six-year term in 1902 and reelected in 1908. When Senator Weldon Brinton Heyburn died in 1912, Ailshie ran unsuccessfully in 1913 for the seat, then filled by Kirtland I. Perky, but he lost the race to James H. Brady. Ailshie resigned his seat on the Idaho Supreme Court in 1914, a few months before his term expired. That year Ailshie moved to Coeur d'Alene, Idaho, and resumed his law practice. He served as vice president of the American Bar Association in 1934.

In 1935 Ailshie again was elected to the Idaho Supreme Court, and he was reelected in 1941. Over the course of his career, he served five separate stints as chief justice, from 1903 to 1904, 1907 to 1908, 1913 to 1914, 1939 to 1941, and 1945 to 1946.

== Personal life ==
In 1894 Ailshie married Lucie Bundren of Jefferson City, Tennessee, and the marriage produced four children: Lucille (McHarg), James F. Ailshie Jr., William Ailshie, and Robert Ailshie. James Jr., served as a U.S. District Attorney in Idaho, and Robert was state attorney general at the time of his death in 1947.

Ailshie became ill in May 1947, was hospitalized briefly, and died several days later at home in Boise on May 27.

Six months after his death, wife Lucie Ailshie died in November 1947, as did their son, Robert Ailshie.

== See also ==
- List of justices of the Idaho Supreme Court

Legal offices
Preceded by Isaac N. Sullivan	Justice of the Idaho Supreme Court; 1903–1914	Succeeded by Warren Truitt
Preceded by N. D. Wernett	Justice of the Idaho Supreme Court; 1936–1947	Succeeded by Paul W. Hyatt
