= 1954 Idaho gubernatorial election =

- November 2, 1954
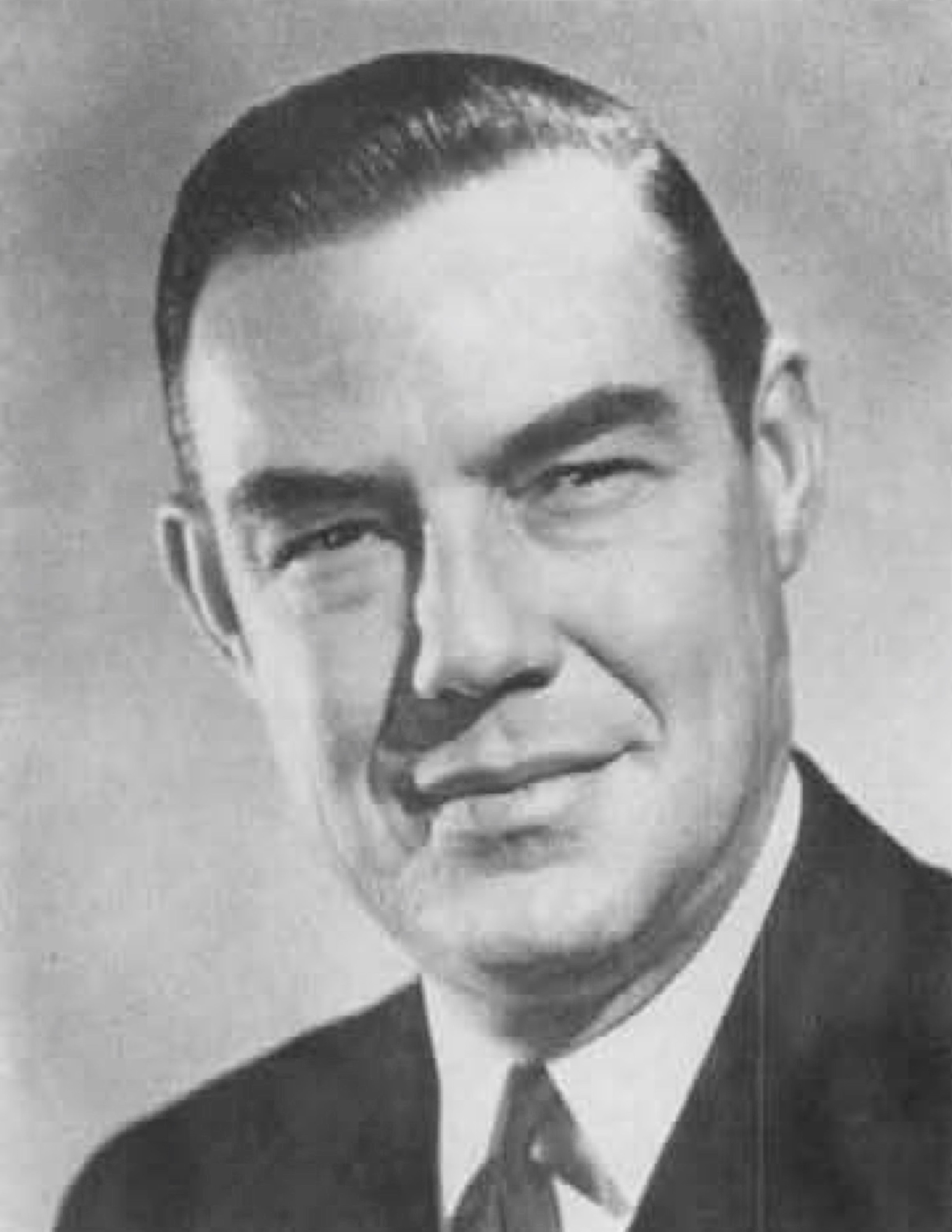

Nominee	Robert E. Smylie	Clark Hamilton
Party	Republican	Democratic
Popular vote	124,038	104,647
Percentage	54.24%	45.76%
- County results Smylie: 50–60% 60–70% Hamilton: 50–60% 60–70% 70–80%
Governor before election
Len Jordan
Republican
Elected Governor
Robert E. Smylie
Republican

The 1954 Idaho gubernatorial election was held on November 2. Republican nominee Robert E. Smylie defeated Democratic nominee Clark Hamilton with 54.24% of the vote.

The incumbent governor was not allowed to run for a second four-year term until 1958.

== Primary elections ==
Primary elections were held on August 10, 1954.

=== Democratic primary ===
==== Candidates ====
- Clark Hamilton, Weiser state senator
- Charles Gossett, Nampa, former governor and senator
- Cantril Nielsen, Pocatello, former county commissioner
- Joseph McNew, Boise

=== Republican primary ===
==== Candidates ====
- Robert E. Smylie, attorney general
- John Sanborn, Hagerman, former congressman
- Larry Gardner, Coeur d'Alene mayor

== General election ==
=== Candidates ===
- Robert E. Smylie, Republican
- Clark Hamilton, Democratic

=== Results ===
1954 Idaho gubernatorial election
Party	Candidate	Votes	%	±%
Republican	Robert E. Smylie	124,038	54.24%	
Democratic	Clark Hamilton	104,647	45.76%	
Majority		19,391		
Turnout		228,685		
Republican hold		Swing		
