= Clark Hamilton =

American politician

Clark Alexander Hamilton (February 26, 1899 – April 22, 1980) was an American politician from Malad City, Idaho. He was the Democratic Party nominee for Governor of Idaho in 1954. Hamilton was defeated by Republican Attorney General Robert E. Smylie.

Hamilton was a member of the Idaho Legislature, serving in the Idaho Senate from 1949 to 1954.

He died in Malheur County, Oregon, in 1980, aged 81.

Party political offices
Preceded by Calvin E. Wright	Democratic Party nominee, Governor of Idaho; 1954 (lost)	Succeeded by A. M. Derr
