= Alfred M. Derr =

American politician

Alfred Derr

Member of the Idaho Senate
- In office 1937–1958
- Succeeded by: Hattie Derr

Personal details
- Party: Democratic
- Children: 5, including Allen Derr
- Education: University of Idaho

Alfred Morley Derr (May 16, 1903 – April 1, 1970) was an American politician who served as a member of the Idaho Senate from 1937 to 1958.

== Career ==
Derr's senatorial career started in 1937, and he was a member of the Idaho Legislature, serving five terms in the Idaho Senate. Because of a surgery, Derr was succeeded by his wife, Hattie Derr. This was the first instance of a woman serving as a senator. He was the Democratic nominee in the 1958 Idaho gubernatorial election, defeated by the Republican incumbent, Robert E. Smylie.

Outside of politics, Derr worked as a farmer, teacher, and logger.

== Personal life ==
Derr met his wife, Hattie Derr, while studying at the University of Idaho. His son, Allen Derr, won the landmark 1971 Reed v. Reed U.S. Supreme Court case in 1971 and co-founded for the Idaho Press Club. Other children include Beverly Shields, John Derr, James Derr, and Jane Betts.

Party political offices
Preceded by Clark Hamilton	Democratic Party nominee, Governor of Idaho; 1958 (lost)	Succeeded by Vernon K. Smith
