= Codi Galloway =

American politician

Member of the Idaho Senate
- Incumbent
- Assumed office December 1, 2024
- Preceded by: Rick Just
- Constituency: 15th district

Member of the Idaho House of Representatives
- In office December 1, 2020 – November 30, 2022
- Preceded by: Jake Ellis
- Succeeded by: Dori Healey
- Constituency: 15th district Seat B

Personal details
- Born: Panama City, Florida, U.S.
- Party: Republican
- Spouse: Scott
- Children: 4
- Relatives: Joe Palmer (uncle)
- Education: Brigham Young University (BA)

Codi Galloway is an American politician who served as a member of the Idaho House of Representatives from the 15th district. Elected in November 2020, she assumed office on December 1, 2020.

== Early life and education ==
Galloway was born in Panama City, Florida, and raised in Ada County, Idaho. She earned a Bachelor of Arts degree in education from Brigham Young University in 1999.

== Career ==
She worked as a public school teacher for three years before establishing a talent development school in Meridian, Idaho. She was elected to the Idaho House of Representatives in November 2020. She assumed office on December 1, 2020, succeeding Democratic incumbent Jake Ellis.
