= 1962 Idaho gubernatorial election =

- November 6, 1962
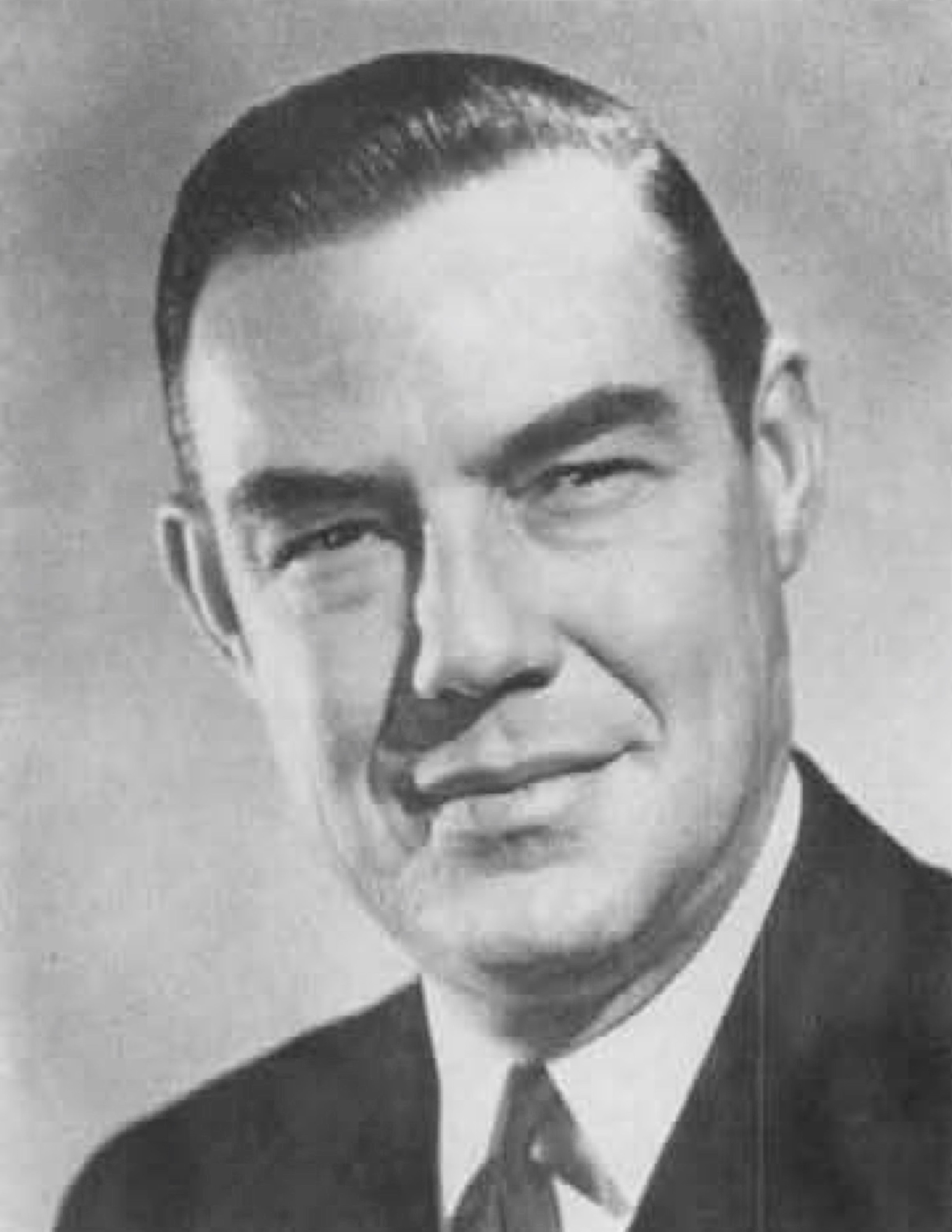

Nominee	Robert E. Smylie	Vernon K. Smith
Party	Republican	Democratic
Popular vote	139,578	115,876
Percentage	54.64%	45.36%
- County results Smylie: 50–60% 60–70% 70–80% Smith: 50–60% 60–70%
Governor before election
Robert E. Smylie
Republican
Elected Governor
Robert E. Smylie
Republican

The 1962 Idaho gubernatorial election was held on November 6; incumbent Republican Robert E. Smylie defeated Democratic nominee Vernon K. Smith with over 54.6% of the vote to win a third term as governor.

== Primary elections ==
Primary elections were held on June 5, 1962.

=== Democratic primary ===
==== Candidates ====
- Vernon K. Smith, Boise attorney
- Charles Herndon, Salmon attorney
- John G. Walters, Boise, former state land commissioner
- Howard D. Hechtner, Lapwai state senator
- Conley E. Ward, Marsing schoolteacher
- Clarence H. Higer, Emmett state legislator

==== Results ====
Democratic primary results
Party	Candidate	Votes	%
Democratic	Vernon K. Smith	35,574	43.13
Democratic	Charles Herndon	18,072	21.91
Democratic	John G. Walters	13,186	15.99
Democratic	Howard D. Hechtner	7,952	9.64
Democratic	Conley E. Ward	5,427	6.58
Democratic	Clarence H. Higer	2,264	2.75
Total votes		82,475	100.00

=== Republican primary ===
==== Candidates ====
- Robert E. Smylie, two-term incumbent governor
- Elvin A. Lindquist, Blackfoot mayor
- George L. Crookham, Caldwell state legislator

==== Results ====
Republican primary results
Party	Candidate	Votes	%
Republican	Robert E. Smylie (incumbent)	37,761	57.22
Republican	Elvin A. Lindquist	16,565	25.10
Republican	George L. Crookham	11,669	17.68
Total votes		65,995	100.00

== General election ==
=== Candidates ===
- Robert E. Smylie, Republican
- Vernon K. Smith, Democratic

=== Results ===
1962 Idaho gubernatorial election
Party	Candidate	Votes	%	±%
Republican	Robert E. Smylie (incumbent)	139,578	54.64%	
Democratic	Vernon K. Smith	115,876	45.36%	
Majority		23,702		
Turnout		255,454		
Republican hold		Swing		
