= Hutton Valley Township, Howell County, Missouri =

Township in Howell County, Missouri, U.S.

Coordinates: 36.9594°N 91.8489°W

Hutton Valley Township is an inactive township in Howell County, in the U.S. state of Missouri.

Hutton Valley Township takes its name from the community of Hutton Valley, Missouri.
