= Lynn Luker =

American politician from Idaho

Lynn M. Luker

Member of the Idaho House of Representatives from District 15 Seat A
- In office December 1, 2006 – November 30, 2018
- Preceded by: Steve Smylie
- Succeeded by: Steve Berch

Personal details
- Born: August 20, 1953 (age 73) Idaho Falls, Idaho, U.S.
- Party: Republican
- Spouse: Helen
- Children: 8
- Education: University of California, Berkeley (BA); University of Idaho (JD)
- Profession: Attorney
- Website: voteluker.com

Lynn M. Luker (born August 20, 1953) is an American politician who served in the Idaho House of Representatives from 2006 to 2018, representing District 15 in the A seat.

== Early life, education, and career ==
Luker was born in Idaho Falls, Idaho and graduated from Lompoc High School. He earned his bachelor's degree in political science from University of California, Berkeley and Juris Doctor from University of Idaho College of Law.

== Idaho House of Representatives ==
In 2004, Luker challenged 12-year incumbent Representative Max Black in the Republican primary, losing by 70 votes. Two years later, Representative Steve Smylie sought the Republican nomination for Superintendent of Public Instruction rather than seek reelection. Luker ran for the seat Smylie was vacating and won the Republican nomination in a three-way primary and the general election.

=== Committee assignments ===
- Judiciary, Rules and Administration Committee
- Local Government Committee
- State Affairs Committee

Luker previously served on the Health and Welfare Committee from 2006 to 2010, and as chairman of the Local Government Committee from 2014 to 2016.

== Elections ==
District 15 House Seat B - Part of Ada County
| Year | Candidate | Votes | Pct | Candidate | Votes | Pct |
|---|---|---|---|---|---|---|
| 2004 Primary | Lynn Luker | 1,053 | 48.4% | Max Black (incumbent) | 1,123 | 51.6% |

District 15 House Seat A - Part of Ada County
| Year | Candidate | Votes | Pct | Candidate | Votes | Pct | Candidate | Votes | Pct | Candidate | Votes | Pct |
|---|---|---|---|---|---|---|---|---|---|---|---|---|
| 2006 Primary | Lynn Luker | 1,793 | 53.2% | Bob Jacobson | 913 | 27.1% | Jeremy Olson | 662 | 19.7% | | | |
| 2006 General | Lynn Luker | 6,811 | 55.2% | Jerry Peterson | 5,524 | 44.8% | | | | | | |
| 2008 Primary | Lynn Luker (incumbent) | 2,118 | 100% | | | | | | | | | |
| 2008 General | Lynn Luker (incumbent) | 12,857 | 100% | | | | | | | | | |
| 2010 Primary | Lynn Luker (incumbent) | 2,237 | 68.9% | Jen Stanko | 1,008 | 31.1% | | | | | | |
| 2010 General | Lynn Luker (incumbent) | 6,401 | 56.0% | Brenda Lovell | 4,280 | 37.5% | James Tucker | 448 | 3.9% | Randy Williamson | 299 | 2.6% |
| 2012 Primary | Lynn Luker (incumbent) | 2,399 | 100% | | | | | | | | | |
| 2012 General | Lynn Luker (incumbent) | 10,602 | 59.0% | Richard Keller | 7,379 | 41.0% | | | | | | |
| 2014 Primary | Lynn Luker (incumbent) | 2,829 | 100% | | | | | | | | | |
| 2014 General | Lynn Luker (incumbent) | 6,615 | 51.6% | Steve Berch | 6,199 | 48.4% | | | | | | |
| 2016 Primary | Lynn Luker (incumbent) | 2,134 | 100% | | | | | | | | | |
| 2016 General | Lynn Luker (incumbent) | 9,663 | 50.8% | Steve Berch | 9,370 | 49.2% | | | | | | |
