= Allen Derr =

American lawyer

- Born: Allen Richard Derr; April 5, 1928; Sandpoint, Idaho, US.
- Died: June 10, 2013 (aged 85); Boise, Idaho, U.S.
- Education: University of Idaho (BA, JD)
- Known for: Successfully arguing Reed v. Reed (1971)
- Parents: Alfred M. Derr (father); Hattie Derr (mother)

Allen Richard Derr (April 5, 1928 – June 10, 2013) was an American lawyer who successfully argued Reed v. Reed, a landmark United States Supreme Court decision issued in 1971 that strengthened anti-discrimination protections for women.

== Early life and education ==
Born in Sandpoint, Idaho, Derr was the son of Idaho politicians. His father, Alfred M. Derr, served in the Idaho Senate. His mother, Hattie Derr, became Idaho's first female state senator in 1937 when she was appointed to the Idaho Senate to fill in for her husband, who was suffering from appendicitis. He was raised in the Idaho Panhandle region. Derr worked as a page in the Idaho Legislature 1941. He graduated from Clark Fork High School in Clark Fork, Idaho, in 1947. Derr earned both his bachelor's degree and Juris Doctor degrees from the University of Idaho.

== Career ==
He ran unsuccessfully as a candidate for the Idaho Legislature during the 1960s. Derr later co-founded the Idaho Press Club and served on its board of directors. A resident of Boise, he continued to practice law until shortly before his death.

Derr was best known for his role in Reed v. Reed. The Supreme Court ruled unanimously for Derr's client, Sally Reed, who sued her estranged husband, Cecil, over who should administer the estate of their late son following his suicide. Derr argued before the Court that the 14th Amendment of the United States Constitution forbid discrimination on the basis of gender. On November 22, 1971, the U.S. Supreme Court ruled unanimously in favor Derr's client, Sally Reed, in a decision written by Chief Justice Warren Burger.

== Personal life ==
Derr died from leukemia in Boise, Idaho, on June 10, 2013, at the age of 85. He was survived by his second wife, former Ada County Commissioner Judy Peavey-Derr. His first wife, Helen Derr, preceded him in death.
