= Robert Ailshie =

American lawyer

20th Attorney General of Idaho
- In office January 6 – November 16, 1947
- Governor: C. A. Robins
- Preceded by: Frank Langley
- Succeeded by: Robert E. Smylie

Personal details
- Born: February 16, 1908 Boise, Idaho, U.S.
- Died: November 16, 1947 (aged 39) Boise, Idaho, U.S.
- Resting place: Cloverdale Memorial Park, Boise, Idaho
- Political party: Republican
- Relations: James F. Ailshie (father)
- Education: University of Idaho (BA); Harvard University (LLB)

Robert Ailshie (February 16, 1908 – November 16, 1947) was an American attorney and politician from Idaho who served as the state's 20th attorney general for fewer than eleven months in 1947. His father, James Ailshie (1868–1947), was a justice on the Idaho Supreme Court for 24 years, with several stints as chief justice.

== Personal life ==
Elected attorney general in November 1946, Ailshie died at age 39 of a heart attack at home; his mother had died a week earlier and his father less than six months prior. His brother James Jr. (1900–1938), a former U.S. attorney, also died of a heart attack in his late thirties, nearly a decade earlier.
