= Idaho's 15th legislative district =

American legislative district

Idaho's 15th legislative district is one of 35 districts of the Idaho Legislature. It is currently represented by Codi Galloway, Republican of Boise, Steve Berch, Democrat of Boise, and Dori Healey, Republican of Boise.

== District profile ==
=== 1992–2002 ===
From 1992 to 2002, District 15 consisted of a portion of Ada County.

Legislature	Session	Senate	House Seat A	House Seat B
51st (1992–1994)	1st	Phil Childers (R)	Dan Hawley (R)	Max Black (R)
51st (1992–1994)	2nd	Phil Childers (R)	Dan Hawley (R)	Max Black (R)
52nd (1994–1996)	1st	Rod Beck (R)	Paul Kjellander (R)	Max Black (R)
52nd (1994–1996)	2nd	Rod Beck (R)	Paul Kjellander (R)	Max Black (R)
53rd (1996–1998)	1st	John Andreason (R)	Paul Kjellander (R)	Max Black (R)
53rd (1996–1998)	2nd	John Andreason (R)	Paul Kjellander (R)	Max Black (R)
54th (1998–2000)	1st	John Andreason (R)	Steve Smylie (R)	Max Black (R)
54th (1998–2000)	2nd	John Andreason (R)	Steve Smylie (R)	Max Black (R)
55th (2000–2002)	1st	John Andreason (R)	Steve Smylie (R)	Max Black (R)
55th (2000–2002)	2nd	John Andreason (R)	Steve Smylie (R)	Max Black (R)

=== 2002–2012 ===
From 2002 to 2012, District 15 consisted of a portion of Ada County.

Legislature	Session	Senate	House Seat A	House Seat B
57th (2002–2004)	1st	John Andreason (R)	Steve Smylie (R)	Max Black (R)
57th (2002–2004)	2nd	John Andreason (R)	Steve Smylie (R)	Max Black (R)
58th (2004–2006)	1st	John Andreason (R)	Steve Smylie (R)	Max Black (R)
58th (2004–2006)	2nd	John Andreason (R)	Steve Smylie (R)	Max Black (R)
59th (2006–2008)	1st	John Andreason (R)	Lynn Luker (R)	Max Black (R)
59th (2006–2008)	2nd	John Andreason (R)	Lynn Luker (R)	Max Black (R)
60th (2008–2010)	1st	John Andreason (R)	Lynn Luker (R)	Max Black (R)
60th (2008–2010)	2nd	John Andreason (R)	Lynn Luker (R)	Max Black (R)
61st (2010–2012)	1st	John Andreason (R)	Lynn Luker (R)	Max Black (R)
61st (2010–2012)	2nd	John Andreason (R)	Lynn Luker (R)	Max Black (R)

=== 2012–2022 ===
From 2012 to 2022, District 15 consisted of a portion of Ada County.

Legislature	Session	Senate	House Seat A	House Seat B
62nd (2012–2014)	1st	Fred Martin (R)	Lynn Luker (R)	Mark Patterson (R)
62nd (2012–2014)	2nd	Fred Martin (R)	Lynn Luker (R)	Patrick McDonald (R)
63rd (2014–2016)	1st	Fred Martin (R)	Lynn Luker (R)	Patrick McDonald (R)
63rd (2014–2016)	2nd	Fred Martin (R)	Lynn Luker (R)	Patrick McDonald (R)
64th (2016–2018)	1st	Fred Martin (R)	Lynn Luker (R)	Patrick McDonald (R)
64th (2016–2018)	2nd	Fred Martin (R)	Lynn Luker (R)	Patrick McDonald (R)
65th (2018–2020)	1st	Fred Martin (R)	Steve Berch (D)	Jake Ellis (D)
65th (2018–2020)	2nd	Fred Martin (R)	Steve Berch (D)	Jake Ellis (D)
66th (2020–2022)	1st	Fred Martin (R)	Steve Berch (D)	Codi Galloway (R)
66th (2020–2022)	2nd	Fred Martin (R)	Steve Berch (D)	Codi Galloway (R)

=== 2022–present ===
District 15 currently consists of a portion of Ada County.

Legislature	Session	Senate	House Seat A	House Seat B
67th (2022–2024)	1st	Rick Just (D)	Steve Berch (D)	Dori Healey (R)
67th (2022–2024)	2nd	Rick Just (D)	Steve Berch (D)	Dori Healey (R)
68th (2024–2026)	1st	Codi Galloway (R)	Steve Berch (D)	Dori Healey (R)

== See also ==
- List of Idaho senators
- List of Idaho representatives
