= Jake Ellis =

American politician and firefighter from Idaho

Member of the Idaho House of Representatives from the District 15, seat B district
- In office December 1, 2018 – November 30, 2020
- Preceded by: Patrick McDonald
- Succeeded by: Codi Galloway

Personal details
- Born: Pocatello, Idaho
- Party: Democratic
- Spouse: Amy
- Education: Boise State University
- Occupation: Politician, firefighter

Jake Ellis is an American politician and former firefighter from Idaho. Ellis was a Democratic member of Idaho House of Representatives for District 15, seat B.

== Early life ==
Ellis was born in Pocatello, Idaho. Ellis is a 4th-generation Idahoan.

== Education ==
In 1998, Ellis earned Bachelor of Arts degree in Communications from Boise State University. Ellis attended the Executive Fire Officer Program at National Fire Academy. Ellis also attended Idaho State University.

== Career ==
In 1988, Ellis became a fireman with Boise Fire Department in Idaho, until 2014. Ellis retired as a Battalion Chief.

== Elections ==
=== 2020 ===
Ellis was unopposed in the Democratic primary. Ellis was defeated by Republican challenger Codi Galloway taking only 47.4% of the vote in the general election.

=== 2018 ===
Ellis was unopposed in the Democratic primary. Ellis defeated Republican incumbent Patrick McDonald with 50.9% of the vote in the general election.

=== 2016 ===
Ellis was unopposed in the Democratic primary. Ellis was defeated by Republican incumbent Patrick McDonald taking only 43.8% of the vote in the general election.

== Awards ==
- 1992 Firefighter of the Year. Presented by City of Boise.

== Personal life ==
Ellis's wife is Amy Ellis. They have two children. Ellis and his family live in Pocatello, Idaho.
