= Max Black (politician) =

American politician from Idaho (1936–2023)

Member of the Idaho House of Representatives from District 15 Seat B
- In office December 1, 1992 – December 1, 2012
- Preceded by: Phil Childers
- Succeeded by: Mark Patterson

Personal details
- Born: July 2, 1936 Delta, Utah, U.S.
- Died: November 10, 2023 (aged 87) Boise, Idaho, U.S.
- Party: Republican
- Education: University of Utah
- Profession: Insurance agent

Max Clark Black (July 2, 1936 – November 10, 2023) was an American politician who was a Republican Idaho State Representative for District 15 in the B seat from 1993 to 2012.

== Background ==
Black was born in Delta, Utah on July 2, 1936. He graduated from Delta High School and earned his bachelor's degree in business administration from the University of Utah. Black died in Boise, Idaho on November 10, 2023, at the age of 87.

== Elections ==
=== 2010 ===
Black won the May 25, 2010, Republican primary with 2,007 votes (58.3%) against Mark Patterson, with no Democratic primary, and Gardner again as the Libertarian nominee. Black won the November 2, 2010, general election with 8,188 votes (78.7%) against Gardner in their final contest together ––their third head-to-head and their sixth overall.

=== 2008 ===
Unopposed for the May 27, 2008, Republican primary, Black won with 2,118 votes; Greg Funk won the Democratic primary unopposed, and Gardner again qualified as the Libertarian candidate, for their fifth contest together. Black won the three-way November 4, 2008, general election with 8,963 votes (54.3%) against Funk and Gardner.

=== 2006 ===
Unopposed for the May 23, 2006, Republican primary, Black won with 3,247 votes, again with no Democratic candidate and again with Gardner as the Libertarian nominee for their fourth match and second head-to-head contest. Black won the November 7, 2006, general election with 8,622 votes (73.51%) against Gardner.

=== 2004 ===
Black won the May 25, 2004, Republican primary with 1,123 votes (51.61%) against Lynn Luker; no Democratic candidate ran, and Gardner again qualified as the Libertarian candidate, setting up a head-to-head match for their third contest. Black won the November 2, 2004, general election with 11,764 votes (77.1%) against Gardner. Luker would go on to win the District 15 A seat in 2006, serving together until 2012.

=== 2002 ===
Black won the May 28, 2002, Republican primary with 2,386 votes (53.5%) against Jack Friesz; Waddell and Gardner won their primaries, setting up a rematch. Black won the three-party November 5, 2002, general election with 6,353 votes (53.2%) against Waddell and Gardner.

=== 2000 ===
Unopposed for the May 23, 2000, Republican primary, Black won with 4,618 votes, and won the three-party November 7, 2000, general election with 9,984 votes (63.2%) against Kathy Waddell (D) and Libertarian nominee Marvin Gardner.

=== 1998 ===
Unopposed for the May 26, 1998, Republican primary, Black won with 2,937 votes, and was unopposed for the November 3, 1998, general election, winning with 10,542 votes.

=== 1996 ===
Black won the May 28, 1996, Republican primary with 2,092 votes (61%) against Dan Westmark, and won the November 5, 1996, general election with 10,396 votes (67.6%) against Debi Gier (D).

=== 1994 ===
Unopposed for the May 24, 1994, Republican primary, Black won with 4,383 votes, and was unopposed for the November 8, 1994, general election, winning with 11,021 votes.

=== 1992 ===
When Republican Representative Phil Childers left the District 15 B seat open for his successful run for the district's senate seat, Black won the Republican primary against John Hart, and won the November 3, 1992, general election against Democratic nominee Kaye Knight.
