= Mark Patterson (Idaho politician) =

American politician from Idaho

Member of the Idaho House of Representatives from District 15 Seat B

Member of the Idaho House of Representatives
- In office December 1, 2012 – January 5, 2014
- Preceded by: Max Black
- Succeeded by: Patrick McDonald

Personal details
- Party: Republican

Mark Patterson is a Republican Idaho State Representative who represented District 15 in the B seat from 2012 to 2014. He gained notoriety in 2013 when it was revealed he had lied about a prior sexual assault conviction on his concealed carry permit.

== Elections ==
Patterson challenged Representative Max Black in the 2010 Republican Primary Election, for District 15, losing by 570 votes. In 2012, Black retired and left the District 15 B seat open.

Patterson won the Republican Primary with 60.1 percent of the vote. He went on to win the general election with 53.1 percent of the vote against Democratic nominee Steve Berch.

Facing resistance due to a charge of not disclosing a previous felony, Patterson resigned and did not run in 2014.

== Criminal history ==
In Florida in 1974, Patterson had pleaded guilty to a felony charge of assault with intent to commit rape. Three years later, he was acquitted of another similar charge in Ohio.

In his 2007 and 2012 Idaho concealed carry gun permit application, Patterson lied about the 1974 conviction. Even though the local sheriff revoked his gun permit, Patterson was allowed to continue carrying his gun because the permit law does not apply to elected officials in the state of Idaho.

On December 20, 2013, Patterson told Idaho Governor Butch Otter (R) that he was resigning, effective January 5, 2014.
