= Steve Smylie =

American politician from Idaho

Member of the Idaho House of Representatives from the 15A district
- In office February 19, 1999 – November 30, 2006
- Preceded by: Paul Kjellander
- Succeeded by: Lynn Luker

Personal details
- Born: October 3, 1953 (age 72) Moscow, Idaho, U.S.
- Party: Republican
- Spouse: Marsha
- Children: 2
- Parent(s): Robert Smylie (father); Lucille Irwin Smylie (mother)
- Education: Northwest Nazarene University (BA); Boise State University (MA)

R. Steve Smylie (born October 3, 1953) is an American politician who served in the Idaho House of Representatives from 1999 to 2006. He unsuccessfully sought the Republican nomination for State Superintendent of Public Instruction in 2006 and later served as a member of the West Ada School Board from 2016 to 2020.

== Early life, education, and career ==
Smylie was born in Moscow, Idaho. He is the son of three-term Idaho Governor Robert Smylie.

== Idaho House of Representatives ==
In 1999, when Paul Kjellander resigned his seat in the legislature to accept appointment to the Idaho Public Utilities Commission, Governor Dirk Kempthorne appointed Smylie to fill Kjellander's unexpired term. Smylie sought and won reelection in 2002 and 2004. He did not seek reelection in 2006 and instead unsuccessfully sought the Republican nomination for Superintendent of Public Instruction, losing to Tom Luna.

== West Ada School Board ==
Smylie was appointed the West Ada School Board on June 9, 2016, to replace Carol Sayles after she was ousted from the board in a recall election on May 17, 2016, he was one of 4 candidates total to be consider for Zone 3. He was unopposed for the 2017 election. Smylie under a threat of recall like the rest of the West Ada School District Board due to the handling of COVID-19 pandemic in schools, decided to resign from his seat October 2020.
