= Edwards v. United States =

- Supreme Court of the United States

Decided May 31, 1932
- Full case name: Edwards v. United States
- Citations: 286 U.S. 482 (more)

Holding
- A law is not invalid when a president signs it after Congress has adjourned, so long as it is signed within 10 days.

Court membership
- Chief Justice Charles E. Hughes Associate Justices Willis Van Devanter · James C. McReynolds; Louis Brandeis · George Sutherland; Pierce Butler · Harlan F. Stone; Owen Roberts · Benjamin N. Cardozo

Case opinion
- Majority: Hughes, joined by unanimous

Laws applied
- Presentment Clause

Edwards v. United States, 286 U.S. 482 (1932), was a United States Supreme Court case in which the court held that a law is not invalid when a president signs it after Congress has adjourned, so long as it is signed within 10 days.

== See also ==
- La Abra Silver Mining Company v. United States
