= List of United States Supreme Court cases, volume 175 =

Supreme Court of the United States
- Interactive map of Supreme Court of the United States
- 38°53′26″N 77°00′16″W
- Established: March 4, 1789; 236 years ago
- Location: Washington, D.C.
- Coordinates: 38°53′26″N 77°00′16″W
- Composition method: Presidential nomination with Senate confirmation
- Authorised by: Constitution of the United States, Art. III, § 1
- Judge term length: life tenure, subject to impeachment and removal
- Number of positions: 9 (by statute)
- Website: supremecourt.gov

This is a list of cases reported in volume 175 of United States Reports, decided by the Supreme Court of the United States in 1899 and 1900.

== Justices of the Supreme Court at the time of volume 175 U.S. ==
The Supreme Court is established by Article III, Section 1 of the Constitution of the United States, which says: "The judicial Power of the United States, shall be vested in one supreme Court . . .". The size of the Court is not specified; the Constitution leaves it to Congress to set the number of justices. Under the Judiciary Act of 1789 Congress originally fixed the number of justices at six (one chief justice and five associate justices). Since 1789 Congress has varied the size of the Court from six to seven, nine, ten, and back to nine justices (always including one chief justice).

When the cases in volume 175 were decided the Court comprised the following nine members:

Portrait	Justice	Office	Home State	Succeeded	Date confirmed by the Senate (Vote)	Tenure on Supreme Court
	Melville Fuller	Chief Justice	Illinois	Morrison Waite	July 20, 1888 (41–20)	October 8, 1888 – July 4, 1910 (Died)
	John Marshall Harlan	Associate Justice	Kentucky	David Davis	November 29, 1877 (Acclamation)	December 10, 1877 – October 14, 1911 (Died)
	Horace Gray	Associate Justice	Massachusetts	Nathan Clifford	December 20, 1881 (51–5)	January 9, 1882 – September 15, 1902 (Died)
	David Josiah Brewer	Associate Justice	Kansas	Stanley Matthews	December 18, 1889 (53–11)	January 6, 1890 – March 28, 1910 (Died)
	Henry Billings Brown	Associate Justice	Michigan	Samuel Freeman Miller	December 29, 1890 (Acclamation)	January 5, 1891 – May 28, 1906 (Retired)
	George Shiras Jr.	Associate Justice	Pennsylvania	Joseph P. Bradley	July 26, 1892 (Acclamation)	October 10, 1892 – February 23, 1903 (Retired)
	Edward Douglass White	Associate Justice	Louisiana	Samuel Blatchford	February 19, 1894 (Acclamation)	March 12, 1894 – December 18, 1910 (Continued as chief justice)
	Rufus W. Peckham	Associate Justice	New York	Howell Edmunds Jackson	December 9, 1895 (Acclamation)	January 6, 1896 – October 24, 1909 (Died)
	Joseph McKenna	Associate Justice	California	Stephen Johnson Field	January 21, 1898 (Acclamation)	January 26, 1898 – January 5, 1925 (Retired)

== Citation style ==
Under the Judiciary Act of 1789 the federal court structure at the time comprised District Courts, which had general trial jurisdiction; Circuit Courts, which had mixed trial and appellate (from the US District Courts) jurisdiction; and the United States Supreme Court, which had appellate jurisdiction over the federal District and Circuit courts—and for certain issues over state courts. The Supreme Court also had limited original jurisdiction (i.e., in which cases could be filed directly with the Supreme Court without first having been heard by a lower federal or state court). There were one or more federal District Courts and/or Circuit Courts in each state, territory, or other geographical region.

The Judiciary Act of 1891 created the United States Courts of Appeals and reassigned the jurisdiction of most routine appeals from the district and circuit courts to these appellate courts. The Act created nine new courts that were originally known as the "United States Circuit Courts of Appeals." The new courts had jurisdiction over most appeals of lower court decisions. The Supreme Court could review either legal issues that a court of appeals certified or decisions of court of appeals by writ of certiorari.

Bluebook citation style is used for case names, citations, and jurisdictions.

- "# Cir." = United States Court of Appeals
  - e.g., "3d Cir." = United States Court of Appeals for the Third Circuit
- "C.C.D." = United States Circuit Court for the District of . . .
  - e.g.,"C.C.D.N.J." = United States Circuit Court for the District of New Jersey
- "D." = United States District Court for the District of . . .
  - e.g.,"D. Mass." = United States District Court for the District of Massachusetts
- "E." = Eastern; "M." = Middle; "N." = Northern; "S." = Southern; "W." = Western
  - e.g.,"C.C.S.D.N.Y." = United States Circuit Court for the Southern District of New York
  - e.g.,"M.D. Ala." = United States District Court for the Middle District of Alabama
- "Ct. Cl." = United States Court of Claims
- The abbreviation of a state's name alone indicates the highest appellate court in that state's judiciary at the time.
  - e.g.,"Pa." = Supreme Court of Pennsylvania
  - e.g.,"Me." = Supreme Judicial Court of Maine

== List of cases in volume 175 U.S. ==
Case Name	Page and year	Opinion of the Court	Concurring opinion(s)	Dissenting opinion(s)	Lower Court	Disposition of case
Jones v. Meehan	1 (1899)	Gray	none	none	C.C.D. Minn.	affirmed
Scudder v. Comptroller	32 (1899)	Gray	none	none	N.Y. County Sur. Ct.	dismissed
Anglo-Californian Bank v. United States	37 (1899)	Fuller	none	none	9th Cir.	dismissed
De la Vergne Refrigerating Machine Company v. German Savings Institution	40 (1899)	Brown	none	none	8th Cir.	reversed
United States v. Conway	60 (1899)	Brown	none	none	Ct. Priv. Land Cl.	reversed
Real de Dolores v. United States	71 (1899)	Brown	none	none	Ct. Priv. Land Cl.	affirmed
Ainsa v. New Mexico and Arizona Railroad Company	76 (1899)	Gray	none	none	Sup. Ct. Terr. Ariz.	reversed
Hartford Fire Insurance Company v. Chicago, Milwaukee and St. Paul Railway Company	91 (1899)	Gray	none	none	8th Cir.	affirmed
Bienville Water Supply Company v. City of Mobile	109 (1899)	Fuller	none	none	C.C.S.D. Ala.	affirmed
In re Blake	114 (1899)	Fuller	none	none	Tenn.	mandamus denied
City of New Orleans v. Warner	120 (1899)	Brown	none	none	5th Cir.	affirmed
Brady v. Daly	148 (1899)	Peckham	none	none	2d Cir.	affirmed
Simms v. Simms	162 (1899)	Gray	none	none	Sup. Ct. Terr. Ariz.	affirmed
Brown v. New Jersey	172 (1899)	Brewer	none	none	N.J.O. and T.	affirmed
Coudert v. United States	178 (1899)	McKenna	none	none	2d Cir.	affirmed
Markuson v. Boucher	184 (1899)	McKenna	none	none	D.N.D.	affirmed
The New York	187 (1899)	Brown	none	none	6th Cir.	reversed
Addyston Pipe and Steel Company v. United States	211 (1899)	Peckham	none	none	6th Cir.	affirmed
Hays v. United States	248 (1899)	Brown	none	none	Ct. Priv. Land Cl.	affirmed
Bolles v. Outing Company	262 (1899)	Brown	none	none	2d Cir.	affirmed
Arkansas Building and Loan Association v. Madden	269 (1899)	Fuller	none	none	C.C.W.D. Tex.	affirmed
Seeberger v. McCormick	274 (1899)	Shiras	none	none	Ill.	dismissed
Malony v. Adsit	281 (1899)	Shiras	none	none	D. Alaska	affirmed
Bradfield v. Roberts	291 (1899)	Peckham	none	none	D.C. Cir.	affirmed
Niles v. Cedar Point Club	300 (1899)	Brewer	none	none	6th Cir.	affirmed
City of New Orleans v. Stemple	309 (1899)	Brewer	none	none	C.C.E.D. La.	reversed
New York and New England Railroad Company v. Conroy	323 (1899)	Shiras	none	Harlan	1st Cir.	certification
Tullis v. Lake Erie and Western Railroad Company	348 (1899)	Fuller	none	none	7th Cir.	certification
The Pedro	354 (1899)	Fuller	none	White	S.D. Fla.	affirmed
The Guido	382 (1899)	Fuller	none	none	S.D. Fla.	affirmed
The Steamship Buena Ventura	384 (1899)	Peckham	none	none	S.D. Fla.	reversed
King v. Cross	396 (1899)	White	none	none	R.I.	affirmed
Abbott v. Tacoma Bank	409 (1899)	Harlan	none	none	Wash.	affirmed
Hamilton v. Rathbone	414 (1899)	Brown	none	none	D.C. Cir.	reversed
La Abra Silver Mining Company v. United States	423 (1899)	Harlan	none	none	Ct. Cl.	affirmed
United States v. Pena	500 (1899)	Brewer	none	none	Ct. Priv. Land Cl.	reversed
United States v. Chavez	509 (1899)	McKenna	none	none	Ct. Priv. Land Cl.	affirmed
Bardes v. Hawarden First National Bank	526 (1899)	Fuller	none	none	N.D. Iowa	dismissed
Cumming v. Richmond County	528 (1899)	Harlan	none	none	Ga. Super. Ct.	affirmed
Peabody v. United States	546 (1899)	Peckham	none	none	Ct. Priv. Land Cl.	affirmed
Chavez v. United States	552 (1900)	Peckham	none	none	Ct. Priv. Land Cl.	affirmed
Northern Pacific Railroad Company v. Amacker	564 (1900)	Brewer	none	none	9th Cir.	affirmed
Blackburn v. Portland Gold Mining Company	571 (1900)	Shiras	none	none	C.C.D. Colo.	affirmed
United States v. Gleason	588 (1900)	Shiras	none	none	Ct. Cl.	reversed
Canada Sugar Refining Company v. Insurance Company of North America	609 (1900)	Shiras	none	none	2d Cir.	reversed
Keokuk and Hamilton Bridge Company v. Illinois	626 (1900)	Fuller	none	none	Ill.	affirmed
Whitcomb v. Smithson	635 (1900)	Fuller	none	none	Minn.	affirmed
Telluride Power Transmission Company v. Rio Grande Western Railway Company	639 (1900)	Brown	none	none	Utah	dismissed
Louisville and Nashville Railroad Company v. Behlmer	648 (1900)	White	none	none	4th Cir.	reversed
The Paquete Habana	677 (1899)	Gray	none	Fuller	S.D. Fla.	reversed

== See also ==
- Certificate of division
