= Dorothy Kenyon =

American lawyer, judge, and political activist (1888–1972)

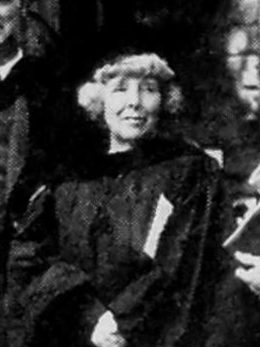
- Kenyon in 1950
- Born: February 17, 1888; New York City, New York, U.S.
- Died: February 12, 1972 (aged 83); New York City, New York, U.S.
- Education: Smith College (BA); New York University (LLB)
- Occupations: attorney, judge

Dorothy Kenyon (February 17, 1888 – February 12, 1972) was a New York attorney, judge, feminist and political activist in support of civil liberties. During the era of McCarthyite persecution, she was accused of being affiliated with 28 communist front organizations. Kenyon was a charismatic speaker, and she regularly travelled throughout the U.S. lecturing about civil liberties, the law, and women's equality.

== Early life ==
Kenyon was born in New York City, to Maria Wellington (Stanwood) and William Houston Kenyon, a patent attorney. She grew up on the Upper West Side of Manhattan, with a family summer home in Lakeville, Connecticut. She graduated from Horace Mann School in 1904. She studied economics and history at Smith College, graduating in 1908. While at Smith she participated in field hockey and tennis, and was elected to Phi Beta Kappa. Kenyon felt that she "misspent" the years 1908 to 1913 as a "social butterfly". After spending a year in Mexico and observing poverty and injustice at a close range, she decided to focus on social activism. She graduated from New York University School of Law in 1917 and was admitted to the New York Bar in the same year.

== Career ==
Kenyon began her legal career in 1917 as a law clerk in the New York firm Gwinn and Deming. Later that year, she began work as a research specialist among the group of lawyers advising delegates to the Paris Peace Conference. As a research specialist, she studied wartime labor patterns and collected economic data for the conference. From 1919 to 1925, Kenyon worked for the firm of Pitkin, Rosenson, and Henderson in New York City.

For most of her career, Kenyon devoted a great deal of her energy to advocating for social justice and a variety of liberal and progressive causes such as the New Deal, women's rights, the labor movement, and consumer cooperatives. In 1930, Kenyon established the law firm of Straus and Kenyon with Dorothy Straus, with whom she worked in partnership to campaign for women's advancement until 1939, when she became a justice of the municipal court. Kenyon was appointed as a member of the New York City Comptroller's council on taxes for the relief of the unemployed in 1934. In 1936 she chaired a committee to study procedure in women's courts where she called for more sympathetic treatment of sex workers and stronger prosecution of their clients and pimps. Kenyon gained national prominence as a feminist activist in 1938 when she was named the U.S. representative to the League of Nations Committee for the Study of the Status of Women, a group of seven lawyers charged with studying women's legal status internationally. World War II interrupted the committee's work and it was never completed. Kenyon resumed her commitment to improving women's status around the world through her work as the U.S. delegate to the United Nations Commission on the Status of Women from 1946 to 1950.

Already well-known in academic, legal, and political circles, in 1950 Dorothy Kenyon made national news when Senator Joseph R. McCarthy named her as the first person to be investigated by the Tydings Committee. McCarthy alleged that Kenyon had been a member of 29 Communist front organizations. Two "reliable former members of the Communist party" reportedly told McCarthy that "she had one job and one job only and that was to attach herself to a prominent individual... high in public life and try to influence the writings of that individual." Kenyon responded aggressively to McCarthy's accusations by declaring: "He's a lowdown worm and although it ought to be beneath my dignity to answer him, I'm mad enough to say that he's a liar and he can go to hell." Of her involvement with communist organizations, she said "I am not, and never have been, a supporter of, a member of, or a sympathizer with any organization known to me to be, or suspected by me, of being controlled or dominated by Communists." In the wake of her confrontation with McCarthy, Kenyon received widespread support from the press and from respected public figures such as Eleanor Roosevelt. Although the Senate subcommittee cleared the charges against her on July 17, McCarthy's accusations ended Kenyon's career in public service.

During the 1950s and 1960s, Kenyon prepared briefs for the National Association for the Advancement of Colored People and worked for the American Civil Liberties Union (ACLU). She continued to push the ACLU to take a stand against sexist policies and institutions, and was the sole woman on the board of the ACLU for many years. She worked with African-American activist and attorney, Pauli Murray, on preparing briefs for cases that challenged sex discrimination in the 1940s and 1950s. She joined the pro Equal Rights Amendment forces, and also teamed with much younger feminists in the emerging women's liberation movement where she participated in the 1971 Women's Strike for Equality and in the burgeoning movement to legalize abortion.

In 1966, Murray and Dorothy Kenyon successfully argued White v. Crook, a case in which the U.S. Court of Appeals for the Fifth Circuit ruled that women have an equal right to serve on juries. When attorney and future Supreme Court justice Ruth Bader Ginsburg wrote her brief for Reed v. Reed—a 1971 Supreme Court case that for the first time extended the Fourteenth Amendment's Equal Protection Clause to women—she added Murray and Kenyon as coauthors in recognition of her debt to their work.

== Personal life ==
Kenyon had lengthy and intense romantic relationships with various men throughout her adult life, including Walcott Pitkin, Elihu Root Jr., and L. V. Pulsifer. Fiercely independent, she made a conscious decision not to marry.

Kenyon participated in various aspects of President Lyndon Johnson's War on Poverty and at age 80, she worked tirelessly and almost single-handedly to establish legal services for the poor on the Lower West Side of Manhattan. When Kenyon was diagnosed with stomach cancer in 1969, she concealed the severity of her illness from most people and refused to suspend or even curtail her legal or political work. She was an active advocate for social justice until her death on February 12, 1972, 5 days before her 84th birthday.

Dorothy Kenyon promised her papers to the Sophia Smith Collection at Smith College in 1951: "Kenyon's brother and sister-in-law W. Houston Kenyon and Mildred Adams Kenyon donated the bulk of the papers in 1980. The bulk of the papers date from 1888–1972 and focus on Kenyon's personal, professional, and political activities."

== Popular culture ==
Kenyon is portrayed by Kathy Bates in the 2018 film On the Basis of Sex, which is about the life and career of Ruth Bader Ginsburg.
