= Malony v. Adsit =

- Supreme Court of the United States

Argued October 25–26, 1899 Decided December 4, 1899
- Full case name: John F. Malony v. Ohlin H. Adsit
- Citations: 175 U.S. 281 (more) 20 S. Ct. 115; 44 L. Ed. 163

Case history
- Prior: Appeal from the District Court of the United States for the District of Alaska

Holding
- Trial judge must authenticate a bill of exceptions.

Court membership
- Chief Justice Melville Fuller Associate Justices John M. Harlan · Horace Gray; David J. Brewer · Henry B. Brown; George Shiras Jr. · Edward D. White; Rufus W. Peckham · Joseph McKenna

Case opinion
- Majority: Shiras, joined by unanimous

Malony v. Adsit, 175 U.S. 281 (1899), is a United States Supreme Court case involving a land lot in the city of Juneau, Alaska. In resolving the land dispute it was held that a bill of exceptions could only be considered if authenticated by the judge who sat on the trial. John F. Malony and Ohlin H. Adsit, the litigants involved, both later became mayors of the city of Juneau.

The case was originally tried before Arthur K. Delaney, a United States district judge for the District of Alaska, who later became the first mayor of Juneau. The lower court sustained Adsit's claim to the property, located at the corner of Franklin and Second Streets in Juneau. Malony was the appellant in the case.

== Background ==
In 1891, the plaintiff, Ohlin H. Adsit had been ejected from a land lot he had taken possession of in 1881. In 1896, he filed suit in the district court to recover possession of the tract. Adsit claimed ownership on grounds of prior occupancy and actual possession at the time of the ejectment. The defendant, John F. Malony, filed a demurrer. He argued that the stated facts did not constitute a sufficient cause of action. The district court held in favor of Adsit, and Malony appealed to the Supreme Court.

Prior to his appeal, Malony had filed a bill of exceptions in the trial court. This bill allows for either party to state in writing any objections to the decision of the court on a point of law. The object of the bill is to put the question of law on record for the information of the court of error having cognizance of such cause. At the time of the filing, the judge who presided over the trial had been succeeded on the bench, and the new judge allowed and signed the bill.

== Opinion of the Court ==
Justice George Shiras Jr. delivered the opinion of the Court. Malony had filed a bill of exceptions in the trial court which had not been signed by the judge who sat on the trial. Shiras concluded that a bill of exceptions which had not been authenticated by the presiding judge could not be considered by the appellate court. Since Malony's demurrer had been overruled, and the bill of exceptions filed was void, the Court had to rule on the facts as presented by the lower court. The judgment of the district court was affirmed.

== Subsequent developments ==
In 1900, Congress amended the law to allow, in certain cases, for the signature of another judge to suffice as authentication. Section 953 of the Revised Statutes, as amended by the Act of June 5, 1900, c. 717, 31 Stat. 270, 28 U.S.C. § 776 (28 USCA § 776). Both Adsit and Delaney later became mayors of Juneau.
