= Addyston Pipe & Steel Co. v. United States =

Addyston Pipe and Steel Co. v. U.S.
- Supreme Court of the United States

Argued April 26–27, 1899 Decided December 4, 1899
- Full case name: Addyston Pipe and Steel Company et al., Appts., v. United States
- Citations: 175 U.S. 211 (more) 20 S. Ct. 96; 44 L. Ed. 136; 1899 U.S. LEXIS 1559

Holding
- Upheld the rule of reason doctrine regarding U.S. antitrust laws.

Court membership
- Chief Justice Melville Fuller Associate Justices John M. Harlan · Horace Gray; David J. Brewer · Henry B. Brown; George Shiras Jr. · Edward D. White; Rufus W. Peckham · Joseph McKenna

Case opinion
- Majority: Peckham, joined by unanimous

Laws applied
- U.S. Const. amends. I, XIV; Sherman Antitrust Act of 1890

Addyston Pipe and Steel Co. v. United States, 175 U.S. 211 (1899), was a United States Supreme Court case in which the Court held that for a restraint of trade to be lawful, it must be ancillary to the main purpose of a lawful contract. A naked restraint on trade is unlawful; it is not a defense that the restraint is reasonable.

== Facts ==
The defendants were pipemakers who were operating in agreement. When municipalities offered projects available to the lowest bidder, all companies but the one designated would overbid, guaranteeing the success of the designated low bidder if no bidder outside the group submitted a bid.

The government argued that some antitrust violations, such as bid rigging, were such egregious anti-competitive acts that they were always illegal (the so-called "per se" rule). The defendants asserted that it was a reasonable restraint of trade and that the Sherman Act could not have meant to prevent such restraints.

== Judgment ==
=== Court of Appeals (6th Circuit) ===
The United States Court of Appeals for the Sixth Circuit noted that it would be impossible for the Sherman Act to prohibit every restraint of trade for that would even encompass employment contracts, which, by their nature, restrain the employee from working elsewhere while they are being paid to work for the employer. Therefore, reasonable restraints were permitted, but this would only apply if the restraint was ancillary to the main purpose of the agreement. No conventional restraint of trade can be enforced unless it is both ancillary to the main purpose of the lawful contract and necessary to protect the enjoyment of legitimate fruits of the contract or protect from the danger of unjust use of those fruits by the other party.

If the primary purpose is to restrain trade, then the agreement is invalid, and in this case, the restraint was direct and therefore invalid.

The opinion was written by Chief Judge William Howard Taft (who later became President of the United States and then Chief Justice of the United States Supreme Court). Taft's reasoning was subsequently adopted by the Supreme Court as the proper interpretation of the Sherman Act.

=== Supreme Court ===
This case was appealed to the Supreme Court as Addyston Pipe and Steel Company v. United States, 175 U.S. 211 (1899). However, on appeal, the defendants did not attack the reasoning of the Sixth Circuit. Instead, they argued that the Commerce Clause of the Constitution did not empower Congress to regulate purely private agreements but instead authorized Congress only to remove barriers to interstate commerce erected by individual states. They argued that even if Congress possessed the authority to regulate purely private agreements, banning defendants' cartel would infringe liberty of contract because the defendants' cartel purportedly set reasonable prices. The defendants' last argument was that their cartel did not directly restrain trade but was simply a partial restraint, which ensured the defendants merely a reasonable rate of return and thus would have been enforceable at common law.

The Court, in an opinion by Justice Peckham, rejected all three arguments and affirmed the decision of the Court of Appeals. Peckham conceded that the framers and ratifiers of the Constitution likely anticipated that the Commerce Clause would authorize mainly Congressional interdiction of state-created barriers to interstate commerce. At the same time, Peckham observed that in some cases, purely private agreements can have the same economic impact and directly restrain commerce among the several states. Moreover, Peckham also held that contracts that directly restrain trade are not the sort of ordinary contracts and combinations that find shelter in liberty of contract. Finally, Peckham held that the defendants' cartel directly restrained trade. Peckham quoted extensively from Judge Taft's opinion below, which found, as a matter of fact, that the defendant's cartel set unreasonable prices. See 85 F. 291–93. In particular, Peckham quoted Taft's finding that pipe produced by the cartel could have been produced and delivered to Atlanta for a cost, including a reasonable profit and the cost of transportation, or $17 or $18 per ton, but the cartel charged instead $24.25 per ton.

== See also ==
- US antitrust law
- List of United States Supreme Court cases, volume 175
