= La Abra Silver Mining Co. v. United States =

- Supreme Court of the United States

Decided December 11, 1899
- Full case name: La Abra Silver Mining Company v. United States
- Citations: 175 U.S. 423 (more)

Holding
- A law is not invalid when a president signs it during a Congressional recess, so long as it is signed within 10 days.

Court membership
- Chief Justice Melville Fuller Associate Justices John M. Harlan · Horace Gray; David J. Brewer · Henry B. Brown; George Shiras Jr. · Edward D. White; Rufus W. Peckham · Joseph McKenna

Case opinion
- Majority: Harlan, joined by unanimous
- Gray, McKenna took no part in the consideration or decision of the case.

Laws applied
- Presentment Clause

La Abra Silver Mining Co. v. United States, 175 U.S. 423 (1899), was a United States Supreme Court case in which the court held that a law is not invalid when a president signs it during a Congressional recess, so long as it is signed within 10 days.

== See also ==
- Edwards v. United States
