= John F. Malony =

American politician (1857–1919)

Member of the Montana Territory House of Representatives from Dawson County
- In office January 8, 1883 – March 18, 1883
- Preceded by: District established
- Succeeded by: George R. Tingle

Acting Mayor of Juneau
- In office 1900
- Succeeded by: Arthur K. Delaney

4th Mayor of Juneau
- In office 1905–1906
- Preceded by: George F. Forrest
- Succeeded by: Herman Tripp

Personal details
- Born: 1857 Shieldsville Township, Minnesota Territory, U.S.
- Died: June 1919 (aged 61–62) Palo Alto, California, U.S.
- Spouses: Unknown (before 1895) Cora Cleveland (m. 1899)
- Education: Shattuck School; St. John's College (Minnesota)

John F. Malony (sometimes misspelled Maloney) (1857 – June 1919) was an American lawyer, capitalist, judge, politician, the first acting mayor of Juneau in 1900, and the 4th mayor, from 1905 to 1906. Born in the Minnesota Territory to Protestant immigrants from Ireland, he first was a judge and politician in the Territory of Montana before moving to Alaska after he was shot by an enemy. He is best known as the appellant in the U.S. Supreme Court case John F. Malony v. Ohlin H. Adsit.

Malony is also known for being one of the founders of the Alaska Electric Light & Power (AEL&P), an important Juneau business since 1893. He was also affiliated with the Treadwell Gold Mine, representing the mine's company in legal issues. Malony was the president of AEL&P from 1905 until his death.

== Early life and education ==
John F. Malony was born in 1857 in present-day Shieldsville Township, Rice County, Minnesota, to Francis and Mary (née Donohue) Malony. His parents had moved inland after first settling in Saint John, New Brunswick, Canada before 1841. He attended the Shattuck School and St. John's College. After college, Malony read law under Gordon E. Cole, the former Attorney General.

== Career ==
=== Montana Territory ===
Malony moved to the Montana Territory as a young lawyer. He was appointed to be a probate judge in September 1882 by the governor and was elected to the Montana Territorial Legislature in November 1882. He represented Dawson County in the 13th General Assembly of the Montana Territorial Legislature in the House of Representatives and at the 1884 Montana Constitutional Convention. He moved to Alaska after he was shot by an enemy while speaking, damaging his left arm.

=== Alaska ===
He moved to Alaska with a son, Joseph, before 1895. His second marriage was to Cora Cleveland, who owned a hat shop in Juneau, on December 29, 1899. By 1900, he owned part the Porcupine Trading Company, after the 1898 Porcupine Gold Rush, along with Jack Dalton and Ed Hanley. Malony served on the first Juneau City Council in 1900 and was later elected mayor of the city.

== Death ==
In January 1919, Malony was reported to have been in critically ill health at his home in Palo Alto, California, by the Alaska Daily Empire. He died in June 1919.
