= Warren Truitt =

American judge (1849–1935)

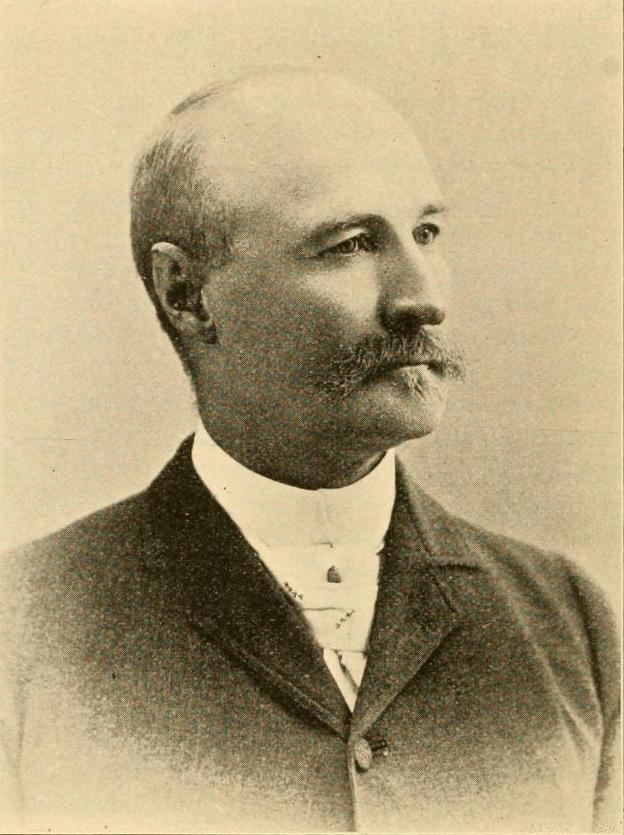
- Portrait, c. 1895

Justice of the Idaho Supreme Court
- In office 1914–1915
- Appointed by: John M. Haines
- Preceded by: James F. Ailshie
- Succeeded by: William McKendree Morgan

Member of the Idaho Senate from the 14th district
- In office December 1, 1906 – December 1, 1908
- Preceded by: M. E. Lewis
- Succeeded by: Jerome J. Day

Judge of the United States Territorial Court for the District of Alaska
- In office 1892–1897
- Appointed by: Benjamin Harrison
- Preceded by: John S. Bugbee
- Succeeded by: Arthur Delaney

Member of the Oregon House of Representatives from Polk County
- In office 1882–1884

Personal details
- Born: July 4, 1849 Greene County, Illinois, U.S.
- Died: October 29, 1935 (aged 86) Moscow, Idaho, U.S.
- Party: Republican
- Spouse: Kathryn Mayer (m. 1888)
- Education: McKendree College

Warren Truitt (July 4, 1849 – October 29, 1935) was an American lawyer, politician and judge. He served in the Oregon House of Representatives from 1882 to 1884, as a judge of Alaska's territorial high court from 1892 to 1897, as a member of the Idaho Senate from 1906 to 1908, and as a justice of the Idaho Supreme Court from 1914 to 1915.

== Early life, education, and career ==
Born in Greene County, Illinois, to Samuel Truitt and Cynthia (Carr) Truitt, he spent his boyhood on a farm in Montgomery County in that state. He worked for his father on the farm in summer and attended school in winter until 1866, when he left home to enter McKendree College, from which he graduated in 1868. He read law to gain admission to the bar in Illinois in 1870, and in the spring of 1871, he moved to Oregon, settling in Polk County.

== Judicial and political career ==
The same year that he arrived in Polk County, 1871, he was elected county probate judge, and served for four years. Declining to run for the office again, he entered into the practice of law, and was in active practice for the next ten years. During this time he was prominent in political affairs in his county and in the state, and was elected to a two-year term representing Polk County in the Oregon House of Representatives from Polk County in 1882. He was a delegate to the Republican State Convention in 1884 and in 1888, and was an elector on the Republican ticket in the 1884 United States presidential election. He canvassed the state for the ticket of James G. Blaine and John A. Logan, later being selected as electoral messenger to carry the presidential vote of Oregon to Washington, D.C. He was considered "a leading Republican of the State", and was chairman of the Republican state central committee for Polk county from 1888 to 1890. From 1889 to 1892, he was register of the United States General Land Office at Lakeview.

In 1892, he was appointed by President Benjamin Harrison to a seat on the United States District Court for the Territory of Alaska, for the Sitka and Wrangell district. He served in that capacity until 1897, although it was reported that by 1896 he was again living at Dallas, Oregon. After several years, he moved to Moscow, Idaho, where he became President of University of Idaho board of regents, and served as a member of the Idaho Senate from 1906 to 1908, representing Latah County, Idaho. On September 12, 1914, Governor John M. Haines appointed Truitt to a seat on the Idaho Supreme Court vacated by the resignation of Chief Justice James F. Ailshie. Truitt remained on the court until 1915, and also served several terms as circuit judge before his death. He was mayor of Moscow from 1917 to 1919.

== Personal life and death ==
On February 28, 1888, Truitt married Kathryn Mayer of New York, with whom he had a son. Truitt died in Moscow, Idaho, at the age of 86.

== See also ==
- List of justices of the Alaska Supreme Court
- List of justices of the Idaho Supreme Court

Political offices
Preceded by John G. Gibson	Mayor of Moscow, Idaho; 1917–1919	Succeeded by John G. Gibson
Preceded by James F. Ailshie	Justice of the Idaho Supreme Court; 1914–1915	Succeeded by William McKendree Morgan
Preceded by John S. Bugbee	Judge of the United States Territorial Court for the District of Alaska; 1892–1897	Succeeded by Arthur Delaney
