= Charles Burtch =

American politician (1893–1972)

Member of the Iowa House of Representatives from the 93rd district
- In office January 12, 1953 – January 8, 1961

Personal details
- Born: Charles R. Burtch; July 2, 1893 Osage, Iowa, U.S.
- Died: November 12, 1972 (aged 79) Osage, Iowa, U.S.
- Party: Republican
- Spouse: Ruth Forward (m. 1923)
- Children: 3
- Occupation: Politician, farmer

Military service
- Allegiance: United States
- Battles/wars: World War I

Charles R. Burtch (July 2, 1893 – November 12, 1972) was an American politician.

Charles Burtch was an Osage, Iowa native, born to parents Adoniram Judson and Adelia Robertson Burtch on July 2, 1893. After graduating from his hometown Osage High School in 1912, Burtch worked as a rural schoolteacher the following year, then became a farmer. He served in World War I with Company G of the 129th Infantry, 33rd Division, seeing action at the Second Battle of the Somme and in the Meuse–Argonne offensive during the final year of the conflict. Burtch returned to his family farm after the war, and married Ruth Forward on December 23, 1923. The couple raised three daughters.

Burtch was a school director, township assessor, and treasurer of the Mitchell County branch of the Farm Bureau before winning election to the Iowa House of Representatives. He served as a Republican legislator for District 93 for four terms, from January 12, 1953, to January 8, 1961.

Burtch died on November 21, 1972, at Mitchell County Memorial Hospital in Osage.
