= Albert Burtch =

19th century American politician

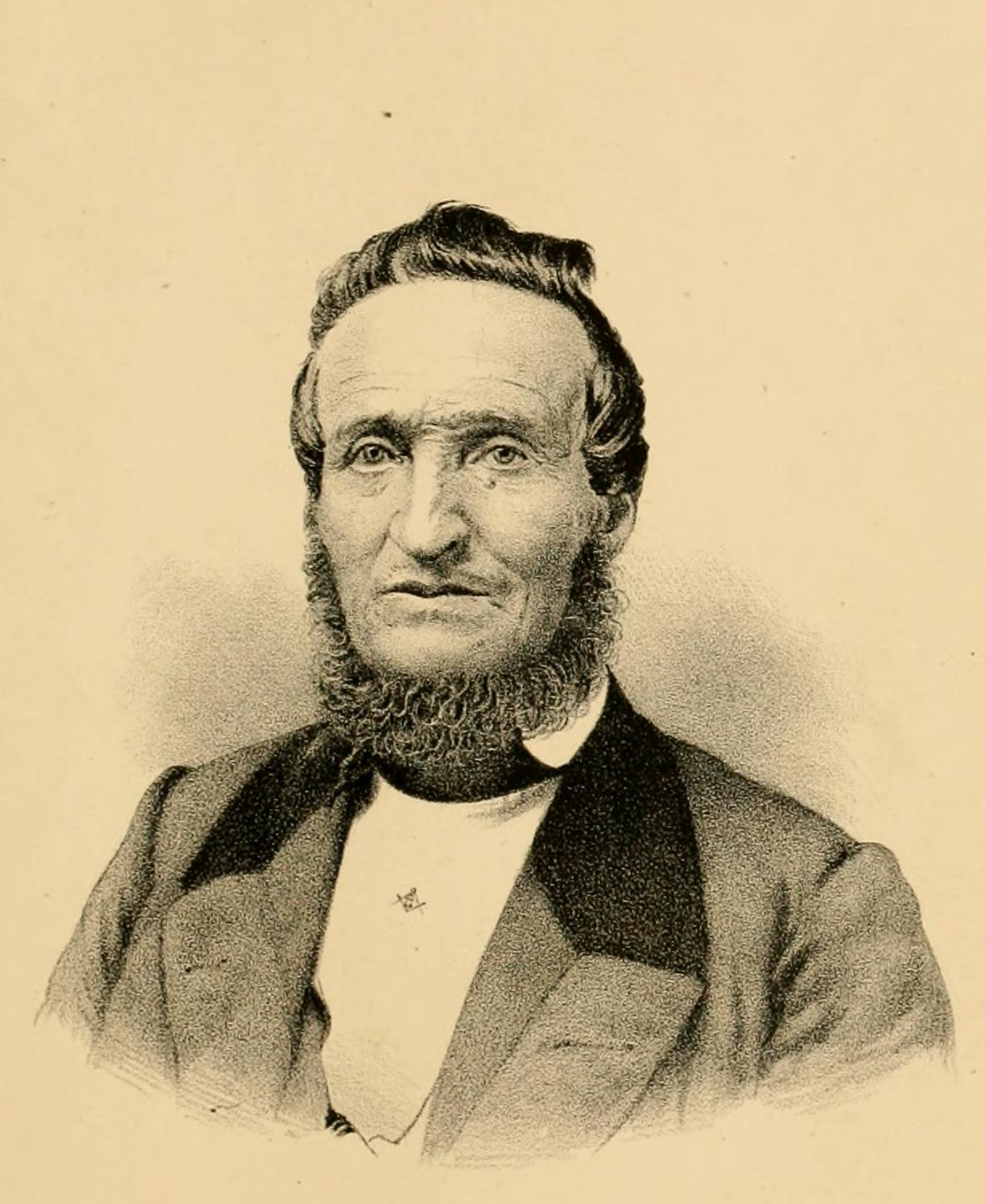
- Portrait from The History of Dodge County, Wisconsin (1880)

Member of the Wisconsin State Assembly from the Dodge 4th district
- In office January 5, 1863 – January 4, 1864
- Preceded by: Jacob G. Mayer
- Succeeded by: Max Bachhuber

Personal details
- Born: September 20, 1804 Herkimer County, New York, U.S.
- Died: March 8, 1888 (aged 83) Mayville, Wisconsin
- Resting place: Graceland Cemetery, Mayville, Wisconsin
- Party: Democratic
- Spouses: Eliza Streeter (died 1864); Zillah Fidelia Goodwin (Barney) (m. 1866; died 1888)
- Children: Albert Burtch Jr.^{(b. 1831; died 1903)}; Sophronia (Madison)^{(b. 1833; died 1905)}; Henry S. Burtch^{(b. 1837; died 1926)}; Gideon W. Burtch^{(b. 1839; died 1905)}; Braiden W. Burtch^{(b. 1842; died 1892)}; Perry E. Burtch^{(b. 1852; died 1872)}; Louisa, Maryetta, Alfred
- Relatives: John A. Barney (step-son)

Albert Burtch Sr. (September 20, 1804 – March 8, 1888) was an American farmer and Wisconsin pioneer. He served one term in the Wisconsin State Assembly, representing Dodge County.

== Biography ==
Albert Burtch was born in Herkimer County, New York, in 1804. He was raised and educated in New York state and came west to the Wisconsin Territory with his family in October 1845. He settled near what would later become the village of Mayville, Wisconsin, and claimed 320 acres of mostly timber land.

He became involved in local affairs and was elected as a village trustee and chairman of the town board. He was elected on the Democratic Party ticket to the Wisconsin State Assembly in 1862 and served in the 16th Wisconsin Legislature. He died on his farm near Mayville in 1888.

== Personal life and family ==
Burtch was married twice and was the father of at least nine children.

His first wife, Eliza Streeter, died in 1864. He married Zillah Fidelia Barney (née Goodwin) in 1866. Zillah was the widow of Benjamin Barney, and from her first marriage had several children. One of those children was John A. Barney, who would later serve in the Wisconsin State Senate and Assembly, and served in the Union Army in the American Civil War—losing an arm at the Battle of Chickamauga.

Burtch's son Henry S. Burtch was also a member of the Wisconsin State Assembly, serving during the 1870 session. He also served in Company E of the 1st Wisconsin Cavalry Regiment during the Civil War and was wounded at the Battle of Nashville.

His son Gideon served in Company E of the 3rd Wisconsin Infantry Regiment during the Civil War.
