= Steve Berch =

American politician from Idaho

Member of the Idaho House of Representatives from District 15 Seat A
- Incumbent
- Assumed office December 1, 2018
- Preceded by: Lynn Luker

Personal details
- Party: Democratic
- Spouse: Leslie Berch
- Children: 1
- Education: University at Albany (BA); University of Minnesota (MBA)
- Website: berch4idaho.com

Steve Berch is an American politician and businessman, currently serving in the Idaho House of Representatives. A Democrat, he is serving the House representing Seat A in Idaho Legislative District 15.

== Education ==
Berch received a bachelor's degree in marketing from the University at Albany, SUNY; he subsequently received an MBA in management information systems from the University of Minnesota.

== Career ==
Berch worked at Hewlett-Packard as a manager for 35 years in Boise prior to being elected to the Idaho House of Representatives. He ran for a House seat five times, eventually winning the seat from Republican Lynn Luker on his fifth try with 54.5 percent of the vote.

Berch previously served on the Greater Boise Auditorium District board from 2013 to 2018.

== Personal life ==
He is married to Leslie Berch.
