= Hutton Valley, Missouri =

Unincorporated community in Missouri, U.S.

Coordinates: 36°57′42″N 91°53′00″W

Location of Hutton Valley within the state of Missouri.

Hutton Valley is an unincorporated community in the township of the same name in northern Howell County, in the U.S. state of Missouri. The community is located approximately five miles east of Willow Springs on Missouri Route U, just south of U.S. Route 60.

== History ==
Hutton Valley was platted in 1873. The community was named after an early settler who settled the valley in which the town is located. A post office called Hutton Valley was established in 1857, and remained in operation until 1953.
