= Henry S. Burtch =

19th century American politician

H. S. Burtch

Member of the Wisconsin State Assembly from the Dodge 3rd district
- In office January 3, 1870 – January 2, 1871
- Preceded by: Arthur Delaney
- Succeeded by: William Rusch

Personal details
- Born: April 10, 1837 Rossie, New York, U.S.
- Died: August 25, 1926 (aged 89) Waco, Nebraska, U.S.
- Resting place: Waco Cemetery, Waco, Nebraska
- Party: Democratic
- Spouses: Sarah Adaline Blanchard (m. 1863; died 1909); 2nd wife
- Children: Winnie E. (Phillips)^{(b. 1864; died 1945)}; May Edna (Flickinger)^{(b. 1870; died 1916)}
- Parent: Albert Burtch (father)

Military service
- Allegiance: United States
- Branch/service: United States Volunteers; Union Army
- Years of service: 1864–1865
- Rank: Private, USV
- Unit: 1st Reg. Wis. Vol. Cavalry
- Battles/wars: American Civil War: Battle of Nashville; Wilson's Raid; Battle of Selma; Battle of West Point

Henry S. Burtch (April 4, 1837 – August 25, 1926) was an American farmer and pioneer settler of Wisconsin and Nebraska. He served one term in the Wisconsin State Assembly, representing Dodge County, and served in the Union Army cavalry during the American Civil War. In historical documents he is often referred to as H. S. Burtch; his name is sometimes misspelled as "Birch".

== Biography ==
Henry Burtch was born at Rossie, New York, on April 10, 1837. He received a common school education there, but interrupted his education to move west with his father in 1845. They settled at the area that would become the village of Mayville, Wisconsin. His father established a homestead on roughly 320 acres of timber land southwest of the village site.

== Civil War service ==
Burtch worked as a farmer until 1864, when he volunteered for service in the Union Army during the American Civil War. He was enrolled as a private in the 1st Wisconsin Cavalry Regiment and went to join the regiment in northern Georgia in October.

The regiment was engaged in foraging and suppression of guerillas in the area near Calhoun, Georgia, until November 4, when they were ordered to Louisville, Kentucky, to receive new weapons and horses. A short time later, they were urgently summoned to Nashville, Tennessee, which was under threat from Confederate general John Bell Hood. Burtch was wounded during the actions at the Battle of Nashville, but returned to duty.

They remained at Waterloo, Alabama, through the Winter. In the Spring of 1865 they joined the march through central Alabama. In April they engaged in fighting associated with the Battle of Selma, then pursued the enemy after the battle and engaged in a running fight for the next several days as the Confederates retreated to the east, eventually into Georgia. At the Battle of West Point they were the lead regiment to attack the fort, losing seven men before the fort was surrendered.

After the battle, the regiment was assigned to patrol duty, and was involved in the capture of Confederate president Jefferson Davis. Burtch mustered out shortly after this incident, on May 16, 1865.

== Postbellum career ==
Burtch returned to farming in Dodge County, and in 1869 he was elected to the Wisconsin State Assembly from Dodge County's 3rd Assembly district—then comprising the northeast corner of the county. Burtch subsequently served several terms on the Dodge County board of supervisors. He moved to Waco, Nebraska, in the 1880s. At Waco, he established a new farmstead and served on the York County, Nebraska, board of county commissioners.

Burtch died at his home in Waco in 1926.

== Personal life and family ==
Burtch's father, Albert Burtch, also served in the Wisconsin State Assembly. His brother, Gideon, also served in the Union Army during the Civil War.

Wisconsin State Assembly
Preceded by Arthur Delaney	Member of the Wisconsin State Assembly from the Dodge 3rd district January 3, 1870 – January 2, 1871	Succeeded by William Rusch
