= Hattie Derr =

American politician

Hattie Catherine Allen Derr (September 20, 1905 – October 31, 1994) was an American politician.

From Clark Fork, Idaho and a student at the University of Idaho, Derr served briefly in the Idaho State Senate when her husband Alfred M. Derr was ill. Her son was Allen Derr who was a lawyer.
