= 1958 Idaho gubernatorial election =

- November 4, 1958
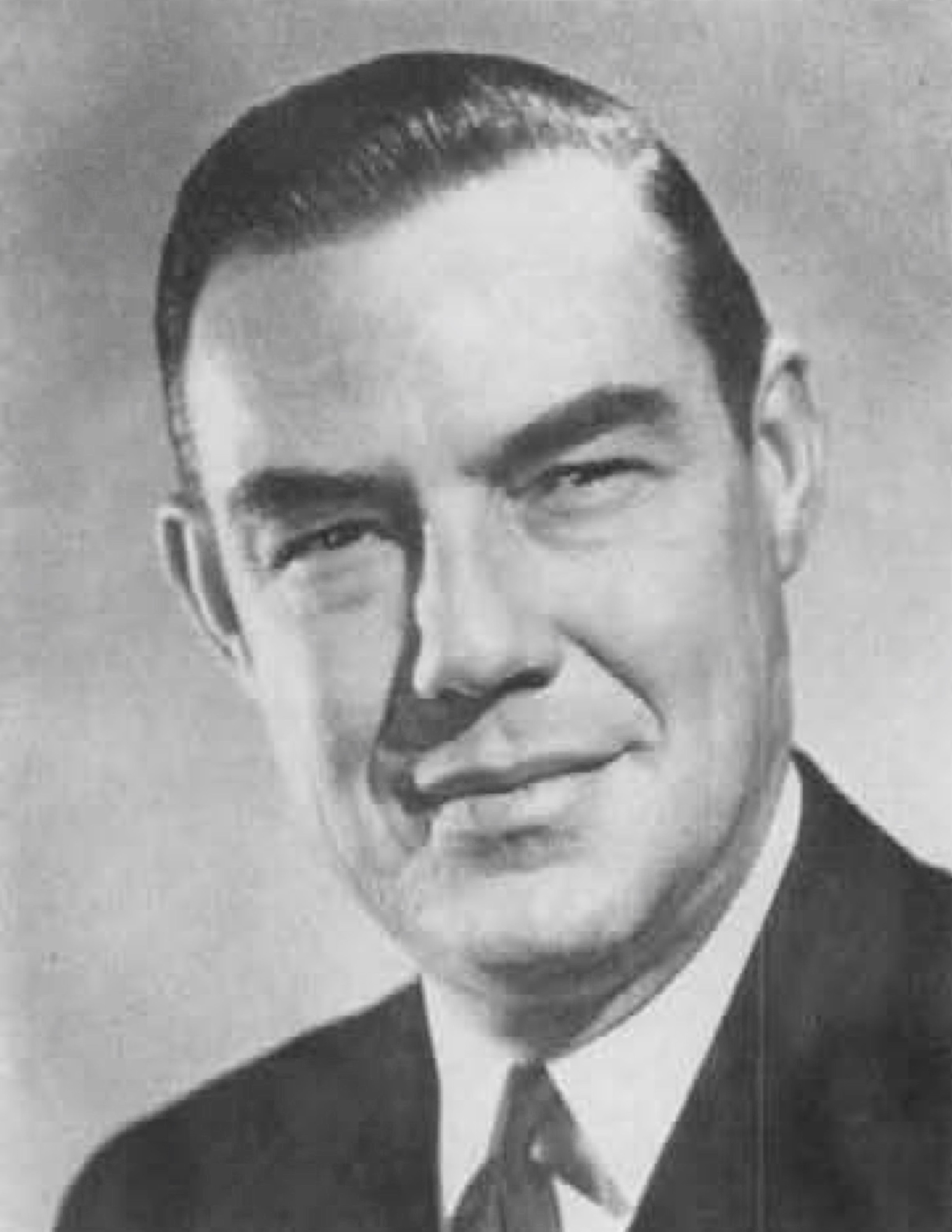

Nominee	Robert E. Smylie	Alfred M. Derr
Party	Republican	Democratic
Popular vote	121,810	117,236
Percentage	50.96%	49.04%
- County results Smylie: 50–60% 60–70% 70–80% Derr: 50–60% 60–70% 70–80%
Governor before election
Robert E. Smylie
Republican
Elected Governor
Robert E. Smylie
Republican

The 1958 Idaho gubernatorial election was held on November 4. Incumbent Republican Robert E. Smylie defeated Democratic nominee Alfred M. Derr with 50.96% of the vote.

Since changing to four-year term for governor beginning with the 1946 election, this was the first time the incumbent was permitted to run for re-election, due to a change in the state's constitution, approved by voters in November 1956. The last incumbent to be re-elected was C. Ben Ross, who won a third two-year term in 1934.

== Primary elections ==
Primary elections were held on August 12, 1958.

=== Democratic primary ===
==== Candidates ====
- Alfred M. Derr, Clark Fork state senator
- H. Max Hanson, Fairfield state senator
- John Glasby, Mountain Home, former state party chairman
- Omar Maine, Parma farmer

==== Results ====
Democratic primary results
Party	Candidate	Votes	%
Democratic	Alfred M. Derr	25,599	
Democratic	H. Max Hanson	25,477	
Democratic	John Glasby	21,207	
Democratic	Omar Maine	1,929	
Total votes		48,613	100.00

=== Republican primary ===
==== Candidate ====
- Robert E. Smylie, incumbent governor (unopposed)

==== Results ====
Republican primary results
Party	Candidate	Votes	%
Republican	Robert E. Smylie (incumbent)	41,568	100.00
Total votes		41,568	100.00

== General election ==
=== Candidates ===
- Robert E. Smylie, Republican
- Alfred M. Derr, Democratic

=== Results ===
1958 Idaho gubernatorial election
Party	Candidate	Votes	%	±%
Republican	Robert E. Smylie (incumbent)	121,810	50.96%	
Democratic	Alfred M. Derr	117,236	49.04%	
Majority		4,574		
Turnout		239,046		
Republican hold		Swing		
