= Moritz v. Commissioner =

1972 American sex discrimination case

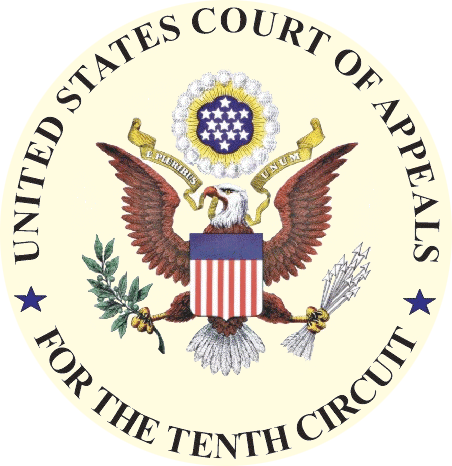
- Court: United States Court of Appeals for the Tenth Circuit
- Full case name: Charles E. Moritz, Petitioner-appellant, v. Commissioner of Internal Revenue, Respondent-appellee
- Decided: November 22, 1972
- Citation: 469 F.2d 466 (10th Cir. 1972)

Case history
- Prior actions: Decision for the Commissioner, 55 T.C. 113 (1970).
- Subsequent actions: Cert. denied, 412 U.S. 906 (1973).

Court membership
- Judges sitting: Judges William Judson Holloway Jr., William Edward Doyle, Fred Daugherty

Charles E. Moritz v. Commissioner of Internal Revenue, 469 F.2d 466 (1972), was a case before the United States Court of Appeals for the Tenth Circuit in which the Court held that discrimination on the basis of sex constitutes a violation of the Equal Protection Clause of the United States Constitution. Charles Moritz had claimed a tax deduction for the cost of a caregiver for his invalid mother and the Internal Revenue Service had denied the deduction. The law specifically allowed such a deduction, but only for women and formerly married men, which Moritz was not.

The United States Tax Court agreed with the IRS's decision to deny the deduction, but on appeal the Tenth Circuit Court of Appeals overturned that decision, holding that the tax code conflicted with the Equal Protection Clause of the U.S. Constitution and extending the caregiver deduction to never-married men.

== Background ==
=== Section 214 ===
During the 1968 tax year, Section 214 of the Internal Revenue Code provided that certain taxpayers could claim a tax deduction for expenses relating to the care of the taxpayer's dependent:

Sec. 214. Expenses for care of certain dependents

(a) General rule.-There shall be allowed as a deduction expenses paid during the taxable year by a taxpayer who is a woman or widower, or is a husband whose wife is incapacitated or is institutionalized, for the care of one or more dependents (as defined in subsection (d) (1)), but only if such care is for the purpose of enabling the taxpayer to be gainfully employed. ...

(d) Definitions.-For purposes of this section- ...

(2) Widower.-The term 'widower' includes an unmarried individual who is legally separated from his spouse under a decree of divorce or of separate maintenance.

Under the terms of the statute, only "a woman or widower, or is a husband whose wife is incapacitated or is institutionalized," was eligible for the deduction.

=== Facts and prior history ===
In 1968, Charles Moritz, a never-married man, claimed a tax deduction under Section 214 for the salary of a caregiver he hired to care for his mother. The Internal Revenue Service (IRS) disallowed the deduction on the grounds that Moritz was not a woman and had never been married, making him ineligible for the caregiver deduction.

Moritz petitioned the United States Tax Court, asking the court to overrule the IRS and hold that he was entitled to the deduction. On October 22, 1970, the Tax Court denied his petition, holding that he was not covered by the statute and rejecting his argument that denial of the deduction was unconstitutional.

Moritz appealed the Tax Court's decision to the United States Court of Appeals for the Tenth Circuit. On appeal, he was represented by Ruth Bader Ginsburg and her husband, Martin D. Ginsburg, aided by Melvin Wulf of the American Civil Liberties Union. They argued that Moritz would have been allowed the deduction if he were female and that there was no rational basis for the difference in treatment between men and women in this case. Therefore, they argued, the denial of the deduction constituted discrimination based on sex and an unconstitutional denial of equal protection in violation of the Fourteenth Amendment to the United States Constitution. They also argued that the appropriate remedy was to allow unmarried men the deduction rather than strike down the entire Section 214, thereby eliminating the dependent care deduction for everyone. The government's response included a computer-generated listing of hundreds of laws that included sex-based criteria which might be at risk if the Section 214 restriction were struck down.

== Opinion of the Court ==
In a unanimous opinion by Appeals Court Judge William Judson Holloway Jr., the court first rejected the government's claim that Moritz had not established that the care he gave was "for the purpose of enabling the taxpayer to be gainfully employed." The government had argued that Moritz would not have been able to provide the care even if he was not working. The court ruled that earlier stipulations had established that purpose and that, anyway, the care being given was not so specialized that Moritz could not provide it. It next held that the classification by sex was "an invidious discrimination and invalid under due process principles. It is not one having a fair and substantial relation to the object of the legislation dealing with the amelioration of burdens on the taxpayer," citing Reed v. Reed.

Finally the court agreed that "extending the coverage of the deduction provisions seems logical and proper, in view of their purpose and the broad separability clause in the act."

== Subsequent history ==
In 1971, Section 214 was amended to allow all "individuals" to deduct dependent care expenses regardless of sex or marital history. However, the change was not made retroactive.

Following the Tenth Circuit's decision, the Internal Revenue Service recommended "[t]hat a petition for writ of certiorari [a request that the Supreme Court hear an appeal from the case] not be filed", but the Department of Justice nonetheless petitioned the Supreme Court for certiorari. On May 21, 1973, the Supreme Court denied the petition, declining to review the Tenth Circuit's decision.

This case was the first time any provision in the Internal Revenue Code was overturned as unconstitutional.

Ruth Bader Ginsburg, who represented Moritz before the 10th Circuit, was appointed an Associate Justice of the Supreme Court of the United States in 1993.

== The case in the media ==
The 2018 film On the Basis of Sex, based on Ruth Bader Ginsburg's life and early career, focuses on Ginsburg's representation of Moritz in this case. The film portrays the attorneys giving their arguments to the Court of Appeals during this case.
