= Reed v. Reed =

- Supreme Court of the United States

Argued October 19, 1971 Decided November 22, 1971
- Full case name: Sally M. Reed, Appellant, v. Cecil R. Reed, Administrator, etc.
- Citations: 404 U.S. 71 (more) 92 S. Ct. 251; 30 L. Ed. 2d 225

Case history
- Prior: 93 Idaho 511, 465 P.2d 635 (1970); probable jurisdiction noted, 401 U.S. 934 (1971).
- Subsequent: On remand, 94 Idaho 542, 493 P.2d 701 (1972).

Holding
- Administrators of estates cannot be named in a way that discriminates between sexes.

Court membership
- Chief Justice Warren E. Burger Associate Justices William O. Douglas · William J. Brennan Jr. Potter Stewart · Byron White; Thurgood Marshall · Harry Blackmun

Case opinion
- Majority: Burger, joined by unanimous

Reed v. Reed, 404 U.S. 71 (1971), is a landmark decision of the Supreme Court of the United States holding that the administrators of estates cannot be named in a way that discriminates between sexes. In Reed v. Reed the Supreme Court ruled for the first time that the Equal Protection Clause of the Fourteenth Amendment to the United States Constitution prohibited differential treatment based on sex.

== The case ==
Sally and Cecil Reed were a separated married couple who were fighting over which of them would be designated as administrator of the estate of their dead son. Each filed a petition with the Probate Court of Ada County, Idaho, asking to be named. Idaho Code specified that "males must be preferred to females" in appointing administrators of estates and the court appointed Cecil as administrator of the estate, valued at less than $1,000. Sally Reed was represented at the Supreme Court by Idaho lawyer Allen Derr, who argued that the Fourteenth Amendment forbids discrimination based on sex.

After a series of appeals by both Sally and Cecil Reed, the Supreme Court considered the case and delivered a unanimous decision that held the Idaho Code's preference in favor of males was arbitrary and unconstitutional. In doing so, the Supreme Court ruled for the first time that the Equal Protection Clause of the Fourteenth Amendment prohibited differential treatment based on sex.

Because the Idaho Code made a distinction based on sex, the court reasoned that "it thus establishes a classification subject to scrutiny under the Equal Protection Clause" and using the generic standard of scrutiny—ordinary or rational basis review—asked "whether a difference in the sex of competing applicants for letters of administration bears a rational relationship to a state objective."

Chief Justice Burger's opinion said:

To give a mandatory preference to members of either sex over members of the other, merely to accomplish the elimination of hearings on the merits, is to make the very kind of arbitrary legislative choice forbidden by the Equal Protection Clause of the Fourteenth Amendment; and whatever may be said as to the positive values of avoiding intrafamily controversy, the choice in this context may not lawfully be mandated solely on the basis of sex.

Before the Supreme Court decided the case, Idaho amended its statutes to eliminate the mandatory preference for males, effective July 1, 1972.

Reed v. Reed was the first major Supreme Court case that addressed that discrimination based on gender was unconstitutional because it denies equal protection. The director for the ACLU, Mel Wulf, and Ruth Bader Ginsburg wrote Sally Reed's brief. They recognized Pauli Murray and Dorothy Kenyon as co-authors of the brief, giving them credit even though they did not help on it because Ginsburg wanted to acknowledge the debt she owed them for their feminist arguments that had created a basis for her arguments.

Those who brought the case had hoped for a broader decision that would have deemed all classifications based on sex "suspect classifications", a category the Supreme Court reserved for race. A suspect classification would be held to a more exacting standard of scrutiny known as strict scrutiny. The ACLU established its Women's Rights Project under Ginsburg to develop cases to persuade the court to treat sex-based distinctions that way.

Hundreds of laws were changed after the Reed v. Reed ruling. "Congress went through all of the provisions of the U.S. Code and changed almost all that classified overtly on the basis of gender. So Congress and the Court were in sync." This court case created the opportunity to analyze laws that dealt with sex-based classifications.

Phillips v. Martin Marietta Corp. reached the Supreme Court as the first case about Title VII gender discrimination in 1971, the same year Reed v. Reed was decided.

As noted by Nina Pillard, Reed created a basis to analyze sex-based discrimination, "so when we see people concluding in policy or in law that there needs to be a line between the treatment of men and the treatment of women because men are a certain way or women like certain things, or don't like certain things, that's the thing that raises the constitutional red flag under equal protection."

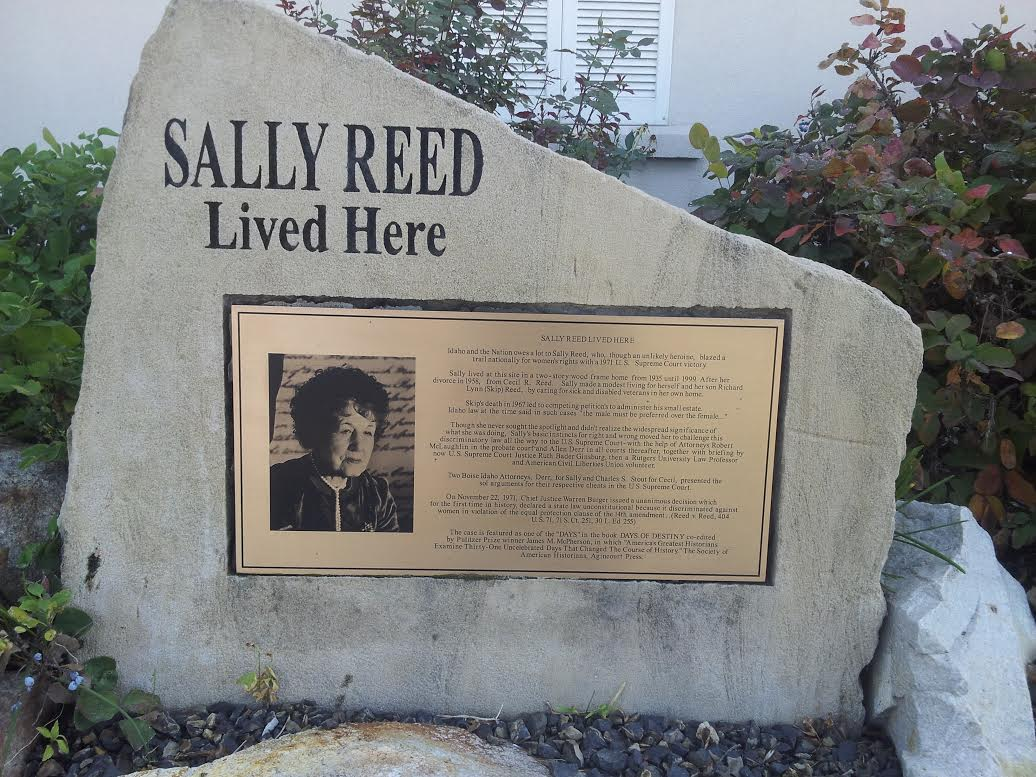
The Sally Reed Memorial

A plaque serves as a memorial to the case at the site of Sally Reed's former home (now the location of an Idaho Angler store) at the intersection of S. Vista Ave. and W. Dorian St. in Boise, Idaho.

== See also ==
- Craig v. Boren
- Frontiero v. Richardson
- Moritz v. Commissioner
- United States v. Virginia
