= Robert E. Smylie =

American politician and attorney

Robert Smylie
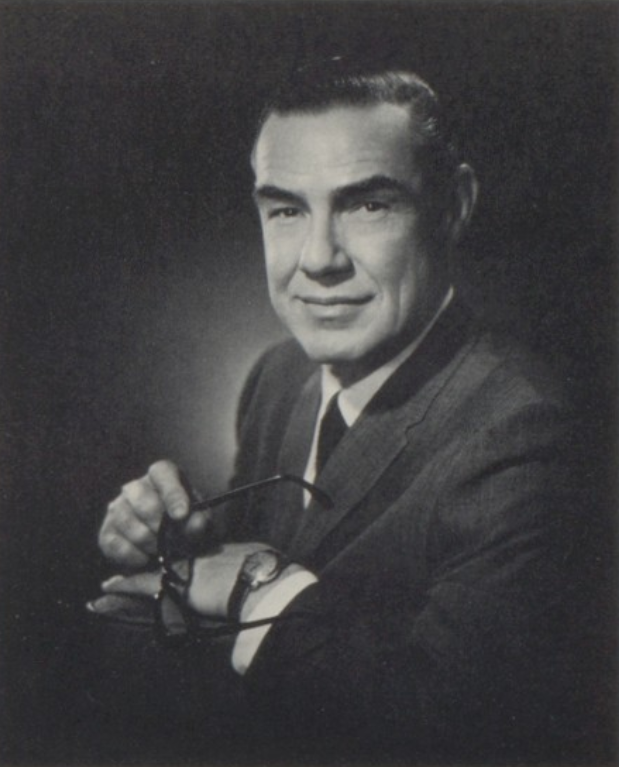

24th Governor of Idaho
- In office January 3, 1955 – January 2, 1967
- Lieutenant: Berkeley Larsen; William Drevlow
- Preceded by: Len Jordan
- Succeeded by: Don Samuelson

19th Attorney General of Idaho
- In office November 24, 1947 – January 3, 1955
- Governor: C. A. Robins; Len Jordan
- Preceded by: Robert Ailshie
- Succeeded by: Graydon W. Smith

Personal details
- Born: Robert Eben Smylie; October 31, 1914 Marcus, Iowa, U.S.
- Died: July 17, 2004 (aged 89) Boise, Idaho, U.S.
- Resting place: Pioneer Cemetery; Boise, Idaho
- Party: Republican
- Spouse: Lucille Irwin (m. 1943)
- Children: 2 (including Steve Smylie)
- Education: College of Idaho (BA); George Washington University (LLB)

Military service
- Allegiance: United States
- Branch/service: U.S. Coast Guard
- Years of service: 1942–1946
- Battles/wars: World War II

Robert Eben Smylie (October 31, 1914 – July 17, 2004) was an American politician and attorney from Idaho. Smylie, who is a member of the Idaho Republican Party, served as the 24th governor of Idaho for twelve years, from 1955 to 1967. He was the first Governor of Idaho who was born in the 20th century. Smylie is Idaho’s third longest governor, with a tenure only one week shorter than future governor Butch Otter.

In the 1966 election, Smylie, who was seeking an unprecedented fourth consecutive term, was defeated in the Republican primary by Idaho State Senator Don Samuelson, who won the election.

== Early life and education ==
Born in Marcus, Iowa, Smylie graduated from high school in Cresco in 1932 at the height of the Great Depression. Offered a place to live by an uncle, in 1934, he moved to Idaho to attend the College of Idaho in Caldwell. During the school year, he participated in speech and debate, the yearbook, football, and student government, and received a scholarship from the National Youth Administration for working as a secretary for the Department of Philosophy and Religion. At the College of Idaho, Smylie studied political science and developed his initial interests in current events—attending a political rally for John Hamilton, chairman of the Republican National Committee during Alf Landon’s campaign against Franklin D. Roosevelt's reelection for the US presidency in 1936, attending Roosevelt's visit to the College of Idaho in 1937, and competing in debate and oratory events at the Pi Kappa Delta National Tournament at Washburn University in Topeka, KS in 1938, the year of his graduation. During his college years, Smylie concluded that hitchhiking was "a thoroughly respectable manner of travel," and would hitchhike back to Iowa in the summers.

== Career ==
After graduating from law school in 1938, he moved to Washington D.C., where he simultaneously clerked at the law firm of Covington Burling, was a United States Capitol Police officer, and attended George Washington University Law School until his graduation in 1942.

Having begun practicing law in Washington, D.C., Smylie left his practice in 1942 to join the United States Coast Guard as a lawyer and was stationed in Philadelphia and the Philippines during World War II. He returned to his private practice in 1946.

=== Attorney general of Idaho ===
In January 1947, Smylie became a deputy attorney general in Idaho, under newly elected Robert Ailshie. That November, Ailshie unexpectedly died of a heart attack at age 39; Smylie was appointed attorney general at age 33 by Governor C. A. Robins, and was elected to a full four-year term in 1950.

=== Governor of Idaho ===
Smylie ran for governor in 1954, as the seat was not eligible for re-election at the time and was held by Republican Len Jordan. Starting with the 1946 election, Idaho changed from two-year to four-year terms for governor, but with the change it disallowed self-succession (re-election). Smylie was elected governor at age forty in 1954 and successfully lobbied the 1955 legislature to propose an amendment to the state constitution to allow gubernatorial re-election, which was approved by voters in the 1956 general election. Smylie, the first Idaho governor born in the 20th century, was re-elected in 1958 and 1962. In his 1962 reelection, with the backing of labor unions, Smylie vowed to veto any legislation that established right-to-work laws in Idaho. Another factor that led to Smylie's reelection in 1962 was his Democratic opponent's support of gambling.

I had an unquenchable thirst to start doing things for Idaho that I thought needed doing (both public school and higher education), in the manner of highway transportation, in economic development, and in the development of a system of parks and recreation.

— Smylie on his time as governor of Idaho.

During his tenure as governor, Smylie increased the minimum wage, established a five-day work week for state employees, increased funding for public education and highway infrastructure, maintained annual balanced budgets, and created the Department of Commerce, the Department of Parks and Recreation, the Idaho State Historical Society Museum, the Department of Water Resources and the Permanent Building Fund. By 1962, Idaho's school districts had been reduced to 110. In February 1955, following a prompt from a BBC reporter, Smylie fast-tracked legislation to remove the anomaly of Idaho being the only one of the 48 states that did not observe George Washington's Birthday as a holiday. While governor, Smylie served as chair of the Western Governors Association (1959–1961) and as chair of the Republican Governors Association. He was a delegate to the Republican National Convention in 1960. Smylie served on the National Governor's Conference Executive Committee from 1956 to 1957, from 1959 to 1960, and in 1963. Smylie was described by a regional columnist as one of the "shrewdest politicians" of the Republican Party.

After Barry Goldwater's loss to Lyndon B. Johnson and the Democrats winning a majority over the Republicans in the Senate and House, Smylie claimed that Goldwater was on the "wrong side of every issue" and remarked that it was one of the biggest losses in the history of the Republican Party and that it needed to move to the center.

Smylie ran for a fourth term in 1966, but was soundly defeated (61–39%) in the Republican primary by his successor, Don Samuelson, whom he had encouraged to run for the state senate six years earlier. Smylie attributed his support of the newly implemented sales tax of three per cent in 1965 as a major factor in his defeat. Other factors that may have led to Smylie's defeat in the Republican primaries were his support of Ray Bliss over pro-Goldwater Dean Burch as chairman of the Republican National Committee and his urging that the Republicans repudiate the right-wing John Birch Society. The sales tax was easily approved by voters in the November election; it stayed at three per cent until 1983, and is now six per cent. Smylie said of the sales tax in 1998: "Its passage marked a defining moment in the state’s struggle toward political and economic maturity."

=== Later career ===
Leaving the governor's office after a dozen years at age 52, Smylie returned to the practice of law in 1967. He served as trustee, chair of trustees, and as acting president of the College of Idaho.

==== 1972 U.S. Senate election ====
Smylie was a candidate for the open U.S. Senate seat in 1972, but finished fourth in the Republican primary, won by Jim McClure.

== Personal life ==
Smylie married Lucile Irwin on December 4, 1943, and the couple had two sons.

Smylie died in Boise at age 89 on July 17, 2004, and his wife Lucile died less than six weeks later. They are interred at the Boise Pioneer Cemetery. Lucile's sister Virgil was the widow of D. Worth Clark, Democratic U.S. Senator from Idaho.

Legal offices
Preceded by Robert Ailshie	Attorney General of Idaho; 1947–1955	Succeeded by Graydon W. Smith
Party political offices
Preceded by Len Jordan	Republican nominee for Governor of Idaho; 1954, 1958, 1962	Succeeded by Don Samuelson
New office	Chair of the Republican Governors Association; 1963–1966	Succeeded by John Love
Political offices
Preceded by Len Jordan	Governor of Idaho; 1955–1967	Succeeded by Don Samuelson
