= George Forrest (American politician) =

American mayor of Juneau

George Frank Forrest (born ca. 1870, Oregon) was an Alaskan politician and the only mayor of Juneau, Alaska to have served non-consecutively three times:

- 1901 to 1902
- 1904 to 1905
- 1907 to 1908

His son, George F. Forrest, Jr. (born on December 12, 1898), served in World War I.
