= 1958 in the United States =

- Decades: 1930s; 1940s; 1950s; 1960s; 1970s
- See also: History of the United States (1945–1964); Timeline of United States history (1950–1969); List of years in the United States

Events from the year 1958 in the United States.

== Incumbents ==
=== Federal government ===
- President: Dwight D. Eisenhower (R-Kansas/Pennsylvania)
- Vice President: Richard Nixon (R-California)
- Chief Justice: Earl Warren (California)
- Speaker of the House of Representatives: Sam Rayburn (D-Texas)
- Senate Majority Leader: Lyndon B. Johnson (D-Texas)
- Congress: 85th

==== State governments ====
Governors and lieutenant governors

=== Governors ===
- Governor of Alabama: Jim Folsom (Democratic)
- Governor of Arizona: Ernest McFarland (Democratic)
- Governor of Arkansas: Orval Faubus (Democratic)
- Governor of California: Goodwin Knight (Republican)
- Governor of Colorado: Stephen L. R. McNichols (Democratic)
- Governor of Connecticut: Abraham A. Ribicoff (Democratic)
- Governor of Delaware: J. Caleb Boggs (Republican)
- Governor of Florida: LeRoy Collins (Democratic)
- Governor of Georgia: Marvin Griffin (Democratic)
- Governor of Idaho: Robert E. Smylie (Republican)
- Governor of Illinois: William G. Stratton (Republican)
- Governor of Indiana: Harold W. Handley (Republican)
- Governor of Iowa: Herschel C. Loveless (Democratic)
- Governor of Kansas: George Docking (Democratic)
- Governor of Kentucky: Happy Chandler (Democratic)
- Governor of Louisiana: Earl K. Long (Democratic)
- Governor of Maine: Edmund Muskie (Democratic)
- Governor of Maryland: Theodore R. McKeldin (Republican)
- Governor of Massachusetts: Foster Furcolo (Democratic)
- Governor of Michigan: G. Mennen Williams (Democratic)
- Governor of Minnesota: Orville L. Freeman (Democratic)
- Governor of Mississippi: James P. Coleman (Democratic)
- Governor of Missouri: James T. Blair Jr. (Democratic)
- Governor of Montana: J. Hugo Aronson (Republican)
- Governor of Nebraska: Victor Anderson (Republican)
- Governor of Nevada: Charles H. Russell (Republican)
- Governor of New Hampshire: Lane Dwinell (Republican)
- Governor of New Jersey: Robert B. Meyner (Democratic)
- Governor of New Mexico: Edwin L. Mechem (Republican)
- Governor of New York: W. Averell Harriman (Democratic) (until end of December 31)
- Governor of North Carolina: Luther H. Hodges (Democratic)
- Governor of North Dakota: John E. Davis (Republican)
- Governor of Ohio: C. William O'Neill (Republican)
- Governor of Oklahoma: Raymond D. Gary (Democratic)
- Governor of Oregon: Robert D. Holmes (Democratic)
- Governor of Pennsylvania: George M. Leader (Democratic)
- Governor of Rhode Island: Dennis J. Roberts (Democratic)
- Governor of South Carolina: George Bell Timmerman Jr. (Democratic)
- Governor of South Dakota: Joe Foss (Republican)
- Governor of Tennessee: Frank G. Clement (Democratic)
- Governor of Texas: Price Daniel (Democratic)
- Governor of Utah: George Dewey Clyde (Republican)
- Governor of Vermont: Joseph B. Johnson (Republican)
- Governor of Virginia: Thomas Bahnson Stanley (Democratic) (until January 11), J. Lindsay Almond (Democratic) (starting January 11)
- Governor of Washington: Albert D. Rosellini (Democratic)
- Governor of West Virginia: Cecil H. Underwood (Republican)
- Governor of Wisconsin: Vernon W. Thomson (Republican)
- Governor of Wyoming: Milward L. Simpson (Republican)

=== Lieutenant governors ===
- Lieutenant Governor of Alabama: William G. Hardwick (Democratic)
- Lieutenant Governor of Arkansas: Nathan Green Gordon (Democratic)
- Lieutenant Governor of California: Harold J. Powers (Republican)
- Lieutenant Governor of Colorado: Frank L. Hays (Republican)
- Lieutenant Governor of Connecticut: Charles W. Jewett (Democratic)
- Lieutenant Governor of Delaware: David P. Buckson (Republican)
- Lieutenant Governor of Georgia: S. Ernest Vandiver (Democratic)
- Lieutenant Governor of Idaho: J. Berkeley Larsen (Republican)
- Lieutenant Governor of Illinois: John William Chapman (Republican)
- Lieutenant Governor of Indiana: Crawford F. Parker (Republican)
- Lieutenant Governor of Iowa: William H. Nicholas (Republican)
- Lieutenant Governor of Kansas: Joseph W. Henkle Sr. (Democratic)
- Lieutenant Governor of Kentucky: Harry Lee Waterfield (Democratic)
- Lieutenant Governor of Louisiana: Lether Frazar (Democratic)
- Lieutenant Governor of Massachusetts: Robert F. Murphy (Democratic)
- Lieutenant Governor of Michigan: Philip A. Hart (Democratic)
- Lieutenant Governor of Minnesota: Karl Rolvaag (Democratic)
- Lieutenant Governor of Mississippi: Carroll Gartin (Democratic)
- Lieutenant Governor of Missouri: Edward V. Long (Democratic)
- Lieutenant Governor of Montana: Paul Cannon (Democratic)
- Lieutenant Governor of Nebraska: Dwight Burney (Republican)
- Lieutenant Governor of Nevada: Rex Bell (Republican)
- Lieutenant Governor of New Mexico: vacant
- Lieutenant Governor of New York: George DeLuca (Democratic) (until end of December 31)
- Lieutenant Governor of North Carolina: Luther E. Barnhardt (Democratic)
- Lieutenant Governor of North Dakota: Francis Clyde Duffy (Republican)
- Lieutenant Governor of Ohio: Paul M. Herbert (Republican)
- Lieutenant Governor of Oklahoma: Cowboy Pink Williams (Democratic)
- Lieutenant Governor of Pennsylvania: Roy E. Furman (Democratic)
- Lieutenant Governor of Rhode Island: Armand H. Cote (Democratic)
- Lieutenant Governor of South Carolina: Ernest Hollings (Democratic)
- Lieutenant Governor of South Dakota: L. Roy Houck (Republican)
- Lieutenant Governor of Tennessee: Jared Maddux (Democratic)
- Lieutenant Governor of Texas: Ben Ramsey (Democratic)
- Lieutenant Governor of Vermont: Robert T. Stafford (Republican)
- Lieutenant Governor of Virginia: Allie Edward Stokes Stephens (Democratic)
- Lieutenant Governor of Washington: John Cherberg (Democratic)
- Lieutenant Governor of Wisconsin: Warren P. Knowles (Republican)

== Events ==
=== January–March ===
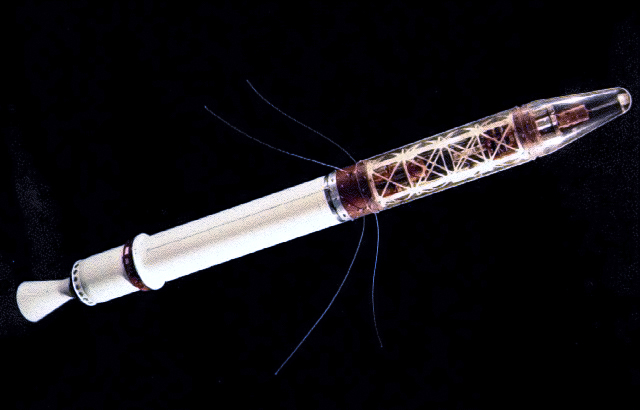
January 31: Explorer 1, the first U.S. satellite

- January 8 – Bobby Fischer, 14 years old at the time, wins the United States Chess Championship.
- January 13 – In One, Inc. v. Olesen, the Supreme Court affirms that homosexual writing is not per se obscene.
- January 18
  - Battle of Hayes Pond: Armed Lumbee Indians confront the Ku Klux Klan in Maxton, North Carolina.
  - The first of Leonard Bernstein's Young People's Concerts with the New York Philharmonic is telecast by CBS. The Emmy-winning series (one concert approximately every 3 months except for the summer) will run for more than 14 years. It will make Bernstein's name a household word, and the most famous conductor in the U.S.
- January 28 – Hall of Fame baseball player Roy Campanella is involved in an automobile accident that ends his career and leaves him paralyzed.
- January 31 – The first successful American satellite, Explorer 1, is launched into orbit.
- February 5 – The Tybee Bomb, a 7,600 pound (3,500 kg) Mark 15 hydrogen bomb, is lost in the waters off Savannah, Georgia.
- February 11 – Ruth Carol Taylor is the first African American woman hired as a flight attendant. Working for Mohawk Airlines, her career lasts only six months, due to another discriminatory barrier – the airline's ban on married flight attendants.
- February 20 – A test rocket explodes at Cape Canaveral.
- February 28 – Prestonsburg, Kentucky bus disaster: The worst school bus accident in U.S. history up to this date occurs at Prestonsburg, Kentucky; 27 are killed.
- March 1 – Archbishop of Chicago Samuel Stritch is appointed Pro-Prefect of the Sacred Congregation for the Propagation of Faith, thus becoming the first American to head a dicastery of the Roman Curia.
- March 8 – The USS Wisconsin is decommissioned, leaving the United States Navy without an active battleship for the first time since 1896 (it is recommissioned October 22, 1988).
- March 11 – 1958 Mars Bluff B-47 nuclear weapon loss incident: A U.S. B-47 bomber accidentally drops an atom bomb on Mars Bluff, South Carolina. Its conventional explosives destroy a house and injure several people, but no nuclear fission occurs.
- March 17
  - The Convention on the Inter-Governmental Maritime Consultative Organization (IMCO) enters into force, founding the IMCO as a specialized agency of the United Nations.
  - The United States launches the Vanguard 1 satellite.
- March 19
  - Monarch Underwear Company fire in New York.
  - Warner Bros. Records, the company which would later become Warner Records, is founded by its namesake, Warner Bros. Pictures.
- March 24 – The U.S. Army inducts Elvis Presley, transforming "The King Of Rock & Roll" into U.S. Private #53310761.
- March 26
  - The United States Army launches Explorer 3.
  - The 30th Academy Awards ceremony, hosted by Bob Hope, Rosalind Russell, David Niven, James Stewart, Jack Lemmon and a premade animation of Donald Duck, is held at RKO Pantages Theatre in Hollywood. David Lean's The Bridge on the River Kwai wins seven awards, including Best Motion Picture and Best Director for Lean. Joshua Logan's Sayonara receives the most nominations with ten.

=== April–June ===
- April – Unemployment in Detroit reaches 20%, marking the height of the Recession of 1958 in the United States.
- April 4 – Killing of Johnny Stompanato: Actress Lana Turner's 14-year-old daughter Cheryl Crane fatally stabs her mother's abusive partner, mobster Johnny Stompanato, at their home in Beverly Hills, California, in what is ruled to be justifiable homicide.
- April 15 – The San Francisco Giants (who until this season were the New York Giants) beat the Los Angeles Dodgers 8–0 at San Francisco's Seals Stadium, in the first Major League Baseball regular-season game ever played in California.
- April 21 – A United Airlines DC-7 and U.S. Air Force F-100 Super Sabre fighter jet collide near Las Vegas, Nevada, killing all 49 aboard the two aircraft.
- May 9 – Actor-singer Paul Robeson, whose passport has been reinstated, sings in a sold-out one-man recital at Carnegie Hall. The recital is such a success that Robeson gives another one at Carnegie Hall a few days later. But after these two concerts, Robeson is seldom seen in public in the United States again. His Carnegie Hall concerts are later released on records and on CD.
- May 12 – A formal North American Aerospace Defense Command agreement is signed between the United States and Canada.
- May 13 – During a visit to Caracas, Venezuela, Vice President Richard M. Nixon's car is attacked by anti-American demonstrators.
- May 20 – A Capital Airlines airliner and Air National Guard jet collide near Brunswick, Maryland, killing 12.ASN Aircraft accident Vickers 745D Viscount N7410 Brunswick, MD
- May 22 – First color television switch: WRC-TV dedication.
- May 23 – Explorer 1 ceases transmission.
- May 30 – The bodies of unidentified soldiers killed in action during World War II and the Korean War are buried at the Tomb of the Unknowns in Arlington National Cemetery.
- June 2 – In San Simeon, California, Hearst Castle opens to the public for guided tours.
- June 8 – The SS Edmund Fitzgerald is launched; it will be the largest freighter on the Great Lakes for more than a dozen years.
- June 15 – The first Pizza Hut restaurant opens in Wichita, Kansas.
- June 17 – The U.S. condemns the execution of Imre Nagy as a "shocking act of cruelty".

=== July–September ===
July 29: NASA established

September 23: The Spirit of Detroit statue is dedicated in Detroit, Michigan.

- July – The plastic hula hoop is first marketed.
- July 3 – US–UK Mutual Defence Agreement signed in Washington, D.C.
- July 7 – President Dwight D. Eisenhower signs the Alaska Statehood Act into United States law.
- July 9 – 1958 Lituya Bay megatsunami: A 7.8 M_{w} strike-slip earthquake in Southeast Alaska causes a landslide that produces a megatsunami. The runup from the waves reached 525 m (1,722 ft) on the rim of Lituya Bay.
- July 15 – During the 1958 Lebanon crisis, 5,000 United States Marines land in the capital Beirut in order to protect the pro-Western government there.
- July 29 – The U.S. Congress formally creates the National Aeronautics and Space Administration (NASA).
- August 3 – The nuclear powered submarine USS Nautilus becomes the first vessel to cross the North Pole under water.
- August 12 – The Federal Switchblade Act is enacted in the United States.
- August 17 – The first Thor-Able rocket is launched, carrying Pioneer 0, from Cape Canaveral Air Force Station Launch Complex 17. The launch fails due to a first stage malfunction.
- August 18 – Vladimir Nabokov's controversial novel Lolita is published in the United States.
- August 21–October 15 – Illinois observes the centennial of the Lincoln–Douglas debates.
- August 23 – President Dwight D. Eisenhower signs the Federal Aviation Act of 1958, transferring all authority over aviation in the U.S. to the newly created Federal Aviation Agency (FAA, later renamed Federal Aviation Administration).
- August 27 – Operation Argus: The United States begins nuclear tests over the South Atlantic.
- September – The University of New Orleans begins classes as the first racially integrated public university in the Southern United States.
- September 15 – Newark Bay rail accident kills 48 people and injures the same number.
- September 18 – "Fresno Drop": BankAmericard, the first credit card to be widely offered, is launched in Fresno, California.
- September 23 – The Spirit of Detroit statue is dedicated in Detroit, Michigan.

=== October–December ===
- October 1 – NASA starts operations and replaces the National Advisory Committee for Aeronautics.
- October 9 – The New York Yankees defeat the Milwaukee Braves, 4 games to 3, to win their 18th World Series Title.
- October 11 – Pioneer 1, the second and most successful of the three-project Able space probes, becomes the first spacecraft launched by the newly formed NASA.
- November 12 – The Nose (El Capitan) in Yosemite National Park is first climbed, by Warren Harding, Wayne Merry and George Whitmore in 47 days.
- November 20 – The Jim Henson Company is founded as Muppets, Inc.
- November 23 – Have Gun, Will Travel debuts on American radio.
- December 1 – Our Lady of the Angels School fire: At least 90 students and 3 nuns are killed in a fire at Our Lady of the Angels School in Chicago.
- December 6 – A third Thor-Able rocket launch, carrying the Pioneer 2 probe, is unsuccessful due to a third-stage ignition failure.
- December 9 – The right-wing John Birch Society is founded in the U.S. by Robert W. Welch Jr., a retired candy manufacturer.
- December 19 – A message from President Dwight D. Eisenhower is broadcast from SCORE, the world's first communications satellite, launched by the U.S. the previous day.
- December 25 – Tchaikovsky's ballet The Nutcracker (the George Balanchine version) is shown on prime-time television in color for the first time, as an episode of the CBS anthology series Playhouse 90.
- December 28 – 1958 NFL Championship Game: The Baltimore Colts beat the New York Giants 23–17 to win the NFL Championship Game, the first to go into sudden death overtime and "The Greatest Game Ever Played".

=== Undated ===
- Based on birth rates (per 1,000 population), the post-war baby boom ends in the United States as an 11-year decline in the birth rate begins (the longest on record in the country).
- The United Kingdom, Soviet Union and the U.S. agree to stop testing atomic bombs for 3 years.
- Robert Frank publishes his photographic essay The Americans (in Paris).
- The PBA Tour is established by the Professional Bowlers Association at its headquarters in Seattle for ten-pin bowling.

=== Ongoing ===
- Cold War (1947–1991)
- Space Race (1957–1975)

== Births ==
=== January ===
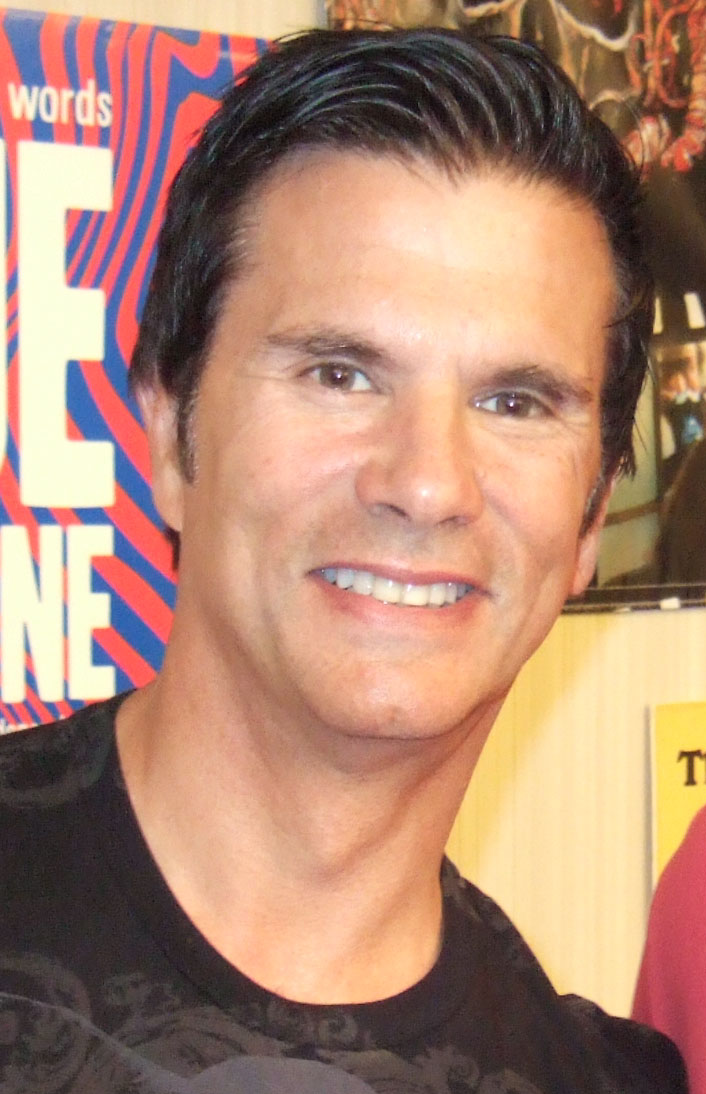
Lorenzo Lamas

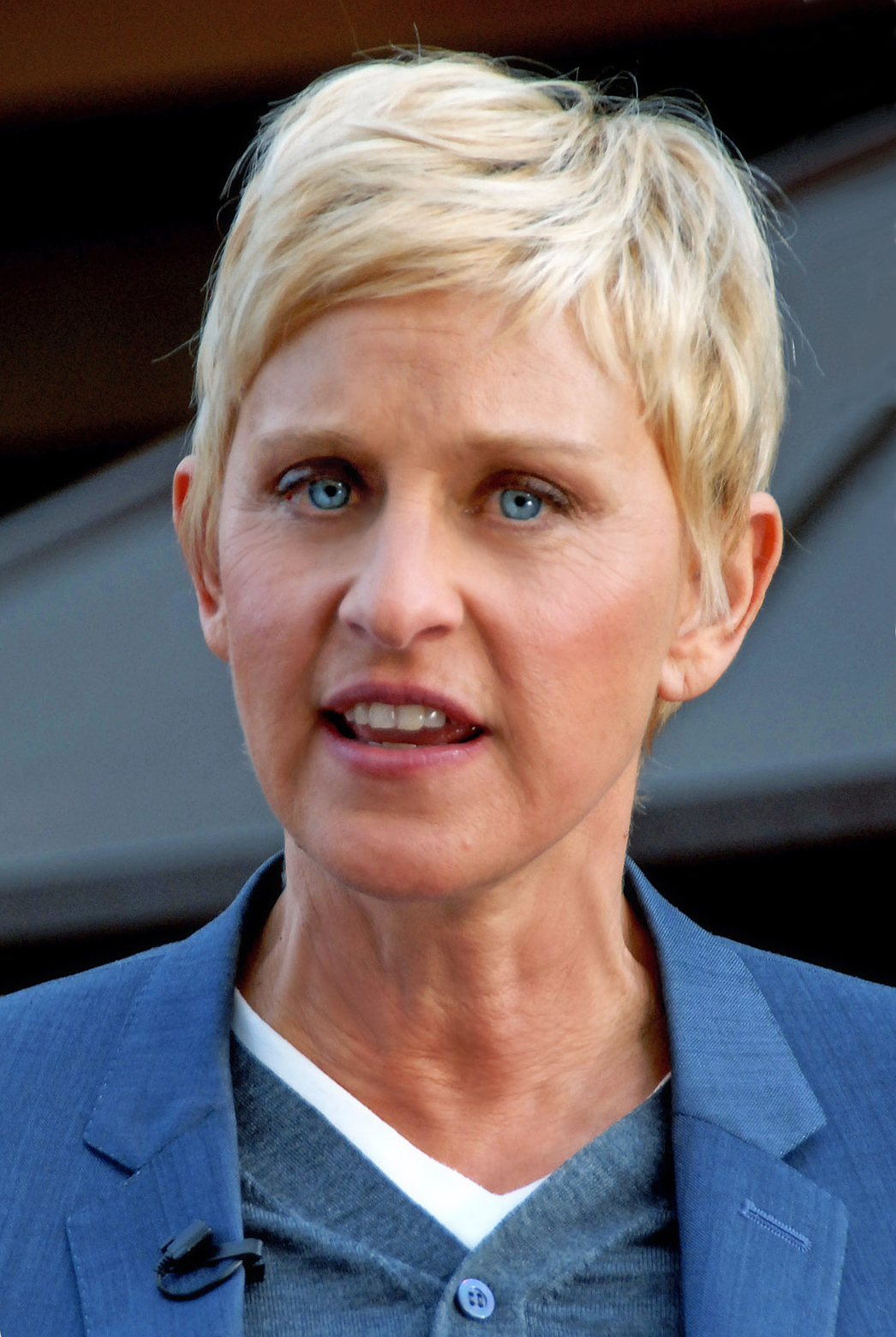
Ellen DeGeneres

- January 1
  - Dave Silk, American ice hockey player and coach
  - Grandmaster Flash, born Joseph Saddler, African American hip-hop/rap DJ
- January 4
  - Andy Borowitz, American comedian and author
  - Lorna Doom, musician (d. 2019)
  - James J. Greco, American businessman
  - Jim Powers, American wrestler
- January 6 – Scott Bryce, actor, director, and producer
- January 8 – Betsy DeVos, 11th United States Secretary of Education
- January 9 – Rob McClanahan, ice hockey player
- January 10 – Eddie Cheever, race car driver
- January 11
  - Alyson Reed, dancer and actress
  - Vicki Peterson, rock musician (The Bangles)
- January 12 – Curt Fraser, American ice hockey coach
- January 14 – Patricia Morrison, American singer-songwriter and bass player
- January 20 – Lorenzo Lamas, American actor, martial artist and reality show participant
- January 21 – Gareth Branwyn, American journalist and critic
- January 23 – Steve Christoff, ice hockey player
- January 24 – Neil Allen, baseball player and coach
- January 26
  - Anita Baker, African-American soul and R&B singer
  - Xavier Becerra, politician and attorney, Attorney General of California
  - Ellen DeGeneres, American actress and comedian
- January 27 – Susanna Thompson, American actress
- January 29 – Stephen Lerner, American labor and community activist

=== February ===
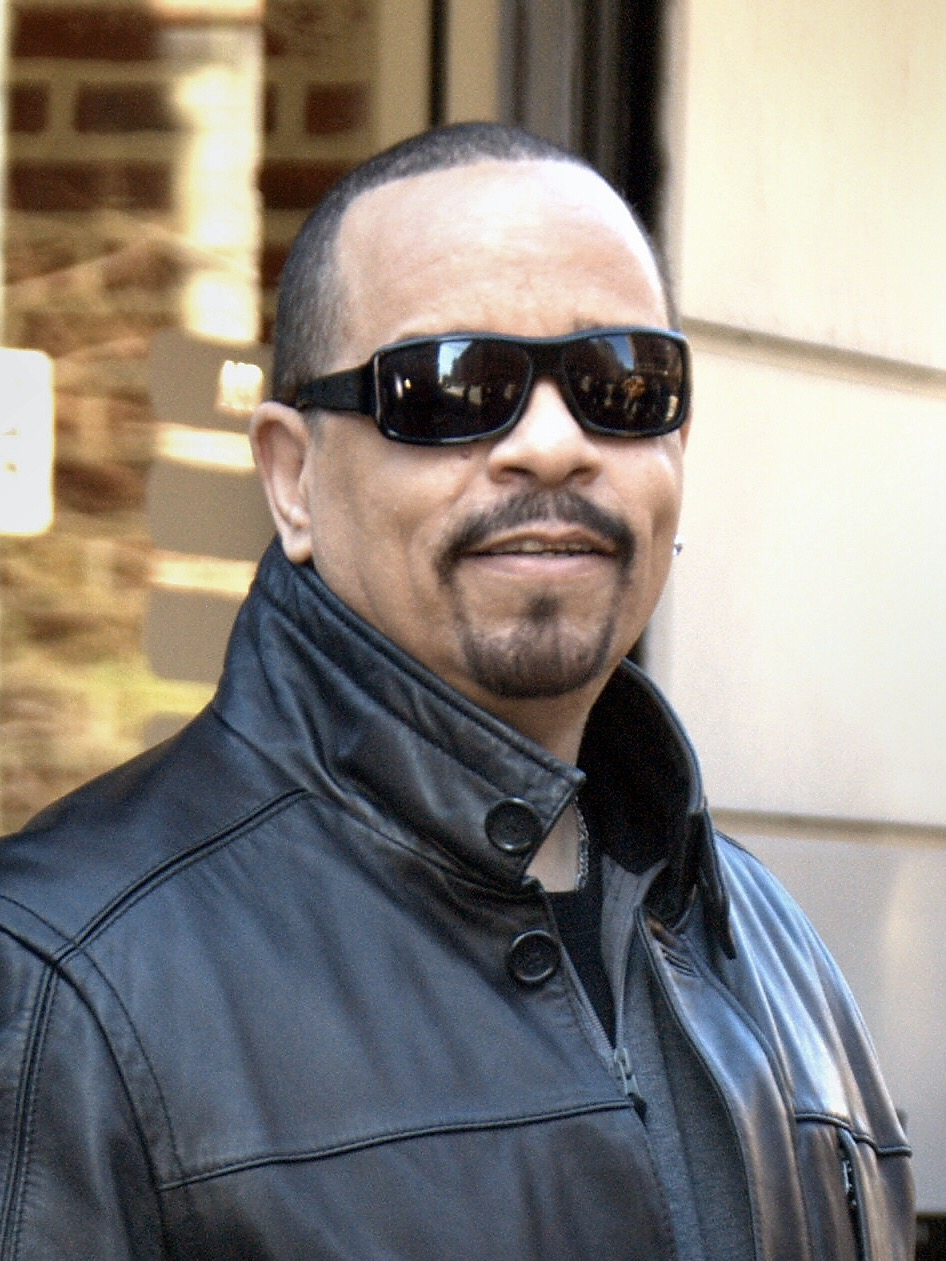
Ice-T

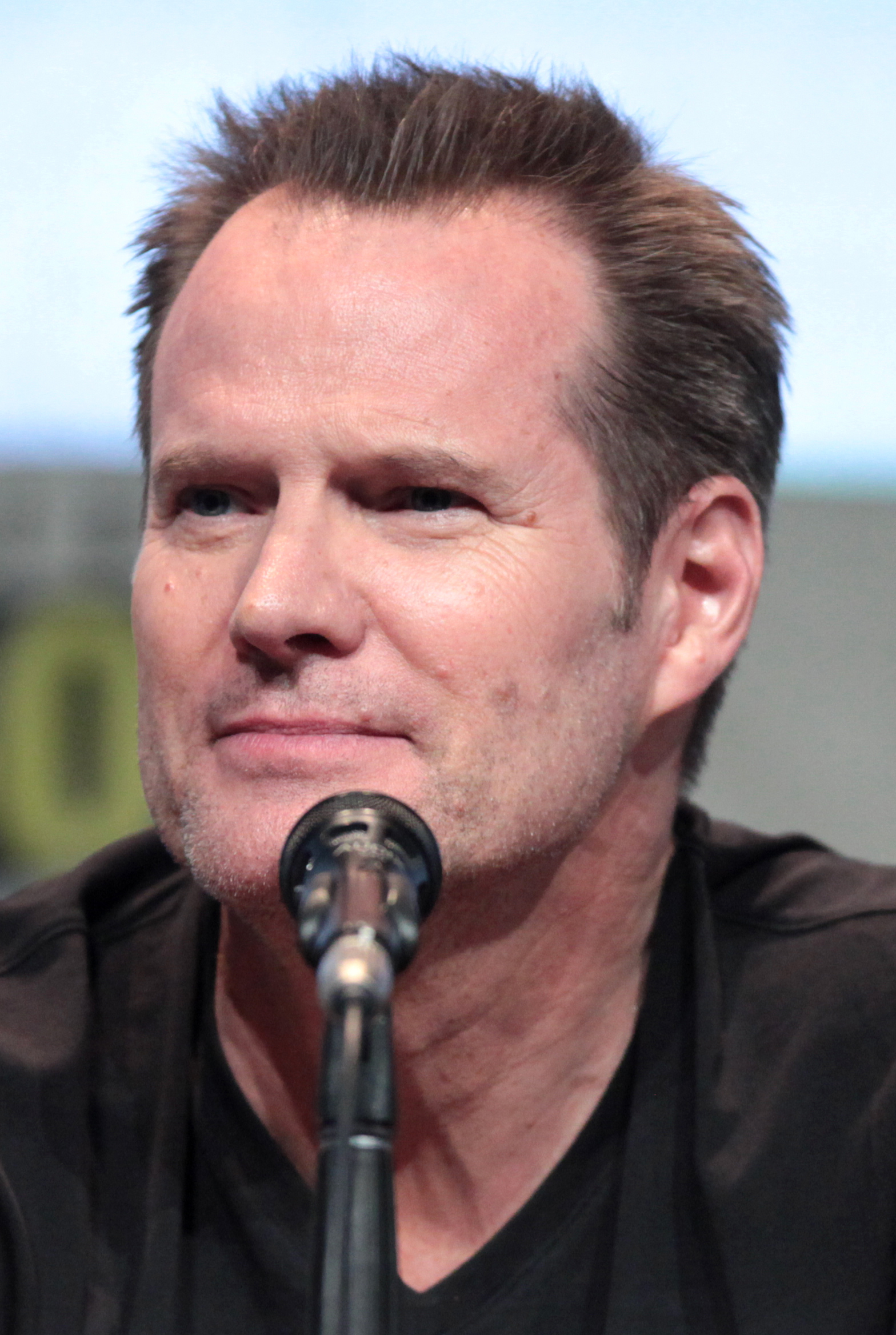
Jack Coleman

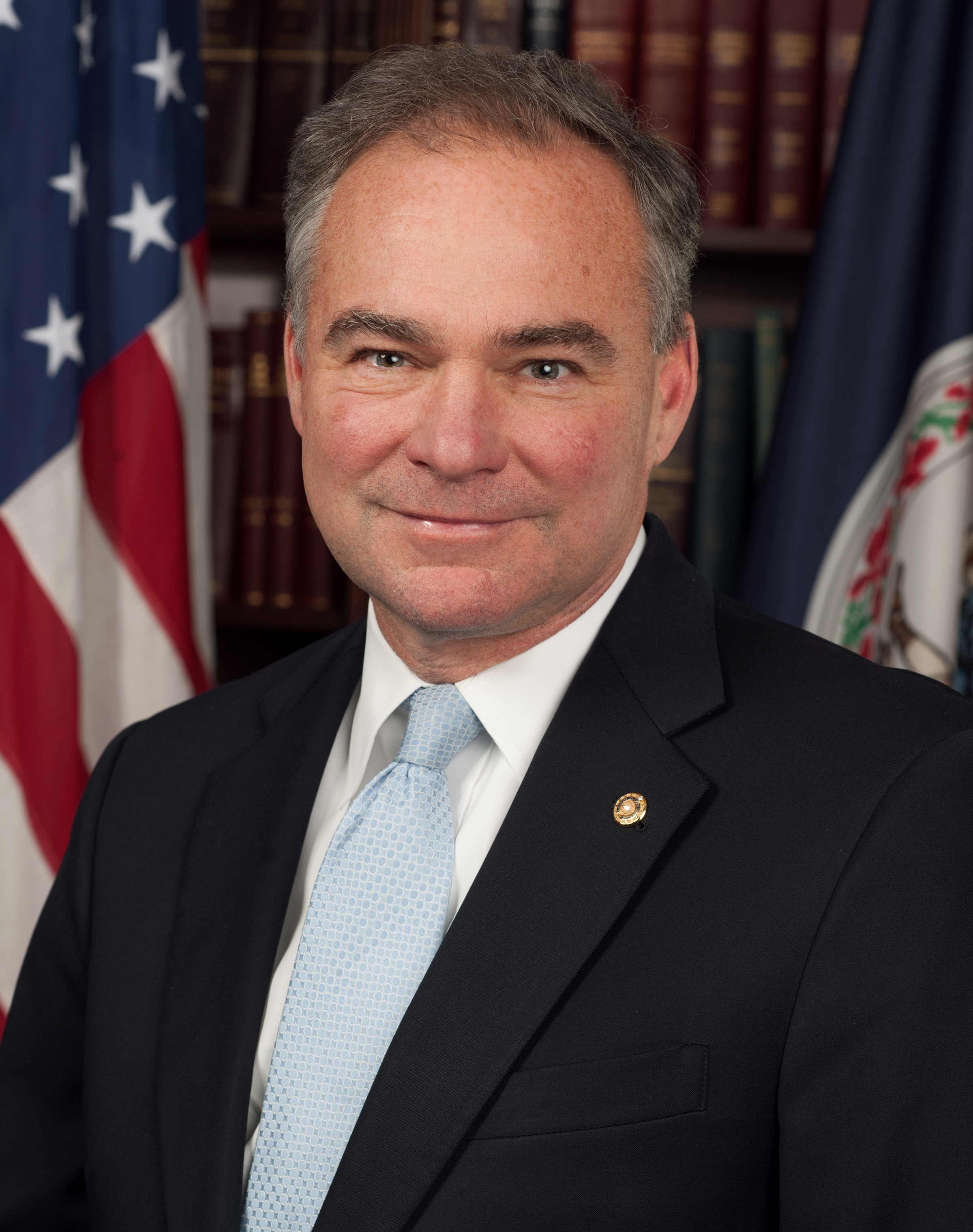
Tim Kaine

- February 7 – Kevin Schon, voice actor
- February 8 – Sherri Martel, professional wrestler (d. 2007)
- February 16
  - Nancy Donahue, fashion model and entrepreneur
  - Ice-T, born Tracy Marrow, rapper
  - Lisa Loring, actress (d. 2023)
- February 17 – Alan Wiggins, baseball player (d. 1991)
- February 18 – Gar Samuelson, drummer (d. 1999)
- February 19 – Leslie David Baker, African-American actor
- February 21
  - Jack Coleman, actor and screenwriter
  - Denise Dowse, actress and director (died 2022)
  - Jake Steinfeld, actor
  - Mary Chapin Carpenter, singer
- February 22 - Richard Greenberg, playwright and television writer
- February 23 - Charles Sheedy, Member of the West Virginia House of Delegates
- February 24 – Todd Fisher, actor
- February 25 – Kurt Rambis, basketball player
- February 26
  - Susan J. Helms, astronaut
  - Tim Kaine, politician
  - Chris Phillips, American voice actor
- February 27
  - Maggie Hassan, U.S. Senator from New Hampshire
  - Michael LeMoyne Kennedy, lawyer and activist (died 1997)
  - Nancy Spungen, American groupie and girlfriend of Sid Vicious (died 1978)
- February 28 – Mark Pavelich, professional ice hockey player (died 2021)

=== March ===
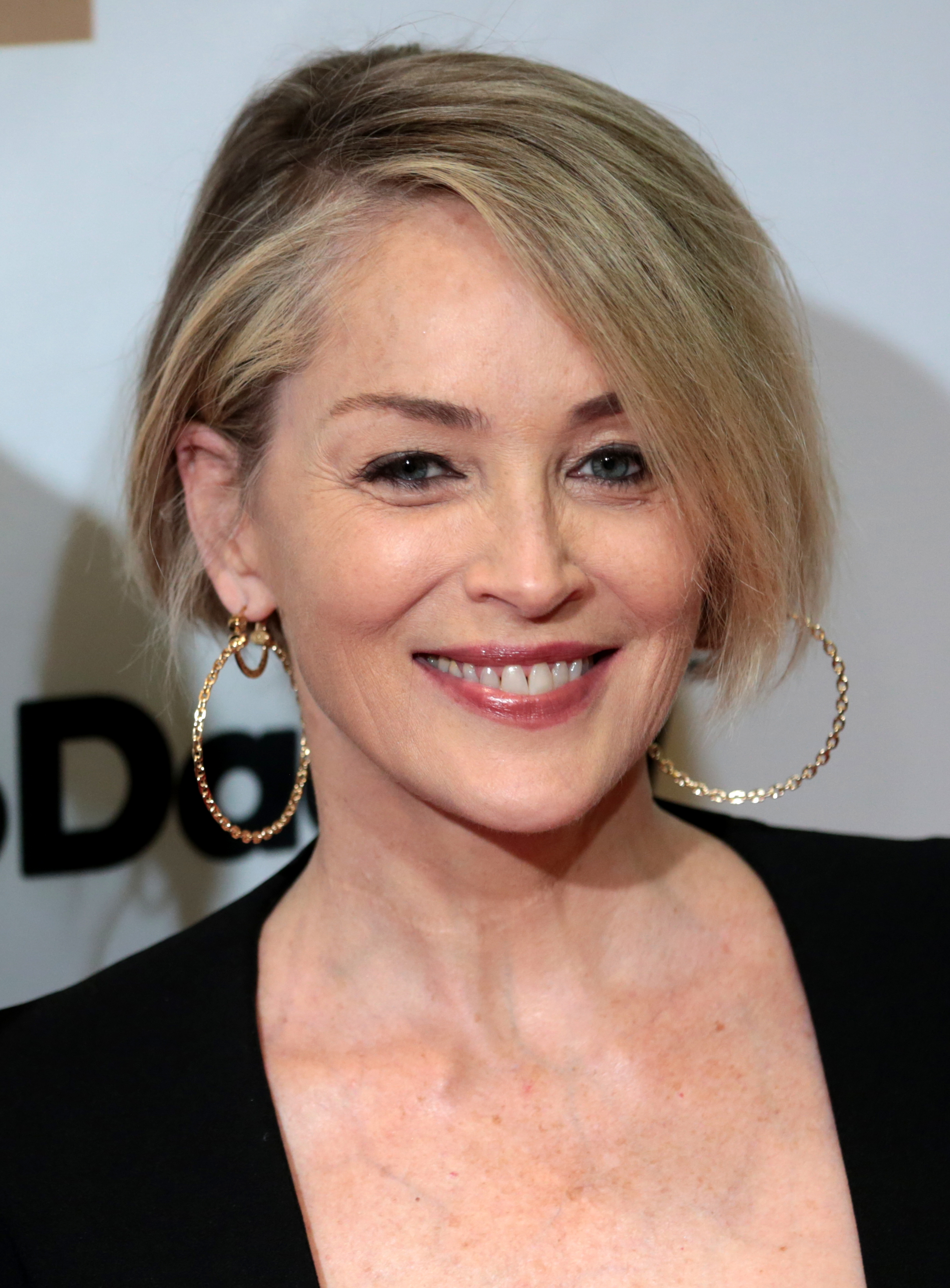
Sharon Stone

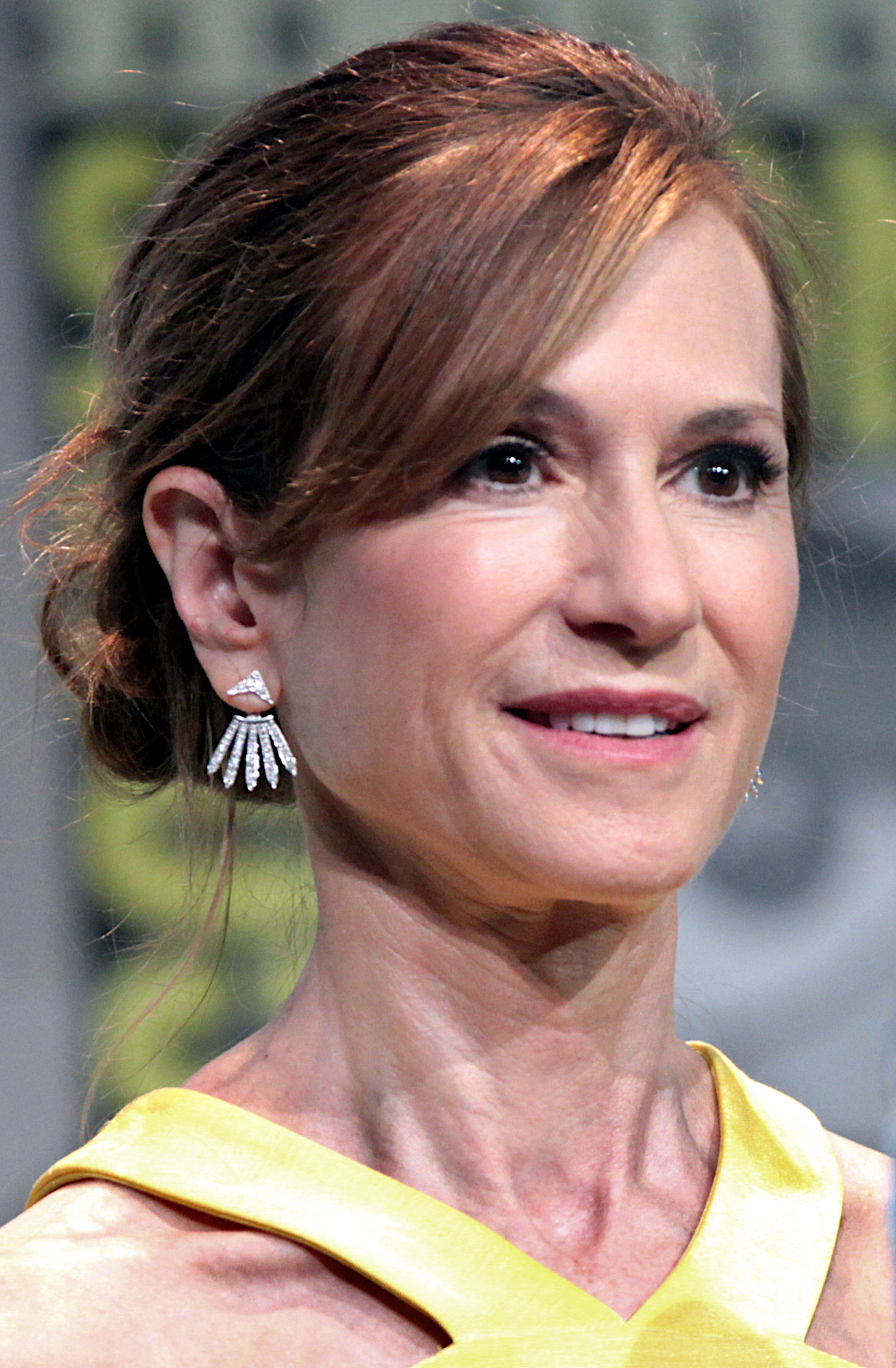
Holly Hunter

- March 4 – Patricia Heaton, American actress
- March 7 – Alan Hale, American astronomer (died 2026)
- March 9
  - Linda Fiorentino, American actress or 1960 (sources differ)
  - Mary Murphy, American dance choreographer
- March 10
  - Steve Howe, American baseball player (died 2006)
  - Sharon Stone, American actress and producer
- March 11 – Anissa Jones, American child actress (“Family Affair”) (died 1976)
- March 15 – John Friedrich, American actor
- March 18
  - John Elefante, American singer and producer (Kansas)
  - Kayo Hatta, American film director (d. 2005)
- March 20 – Holly Hunter, American actress
- March 23
  - Eldon Hoke, American singer and drummer (d. 1997)
  - Michael Sorich, American voice actor, actor, writer, director and voice director
- March 25
  - John Ensign, politician
  - James McDaniel, actor
- March 26 – Todd Joseph Miles Holden, American-born social scientist, author, basketball coach
- March 28
  - Bart Conner, American gymnast
  - Curt Hennig, American professional wrestler (died 2003)
- March 31 – Lisa Michelson, American voice actress (died 1991)

=== April ===
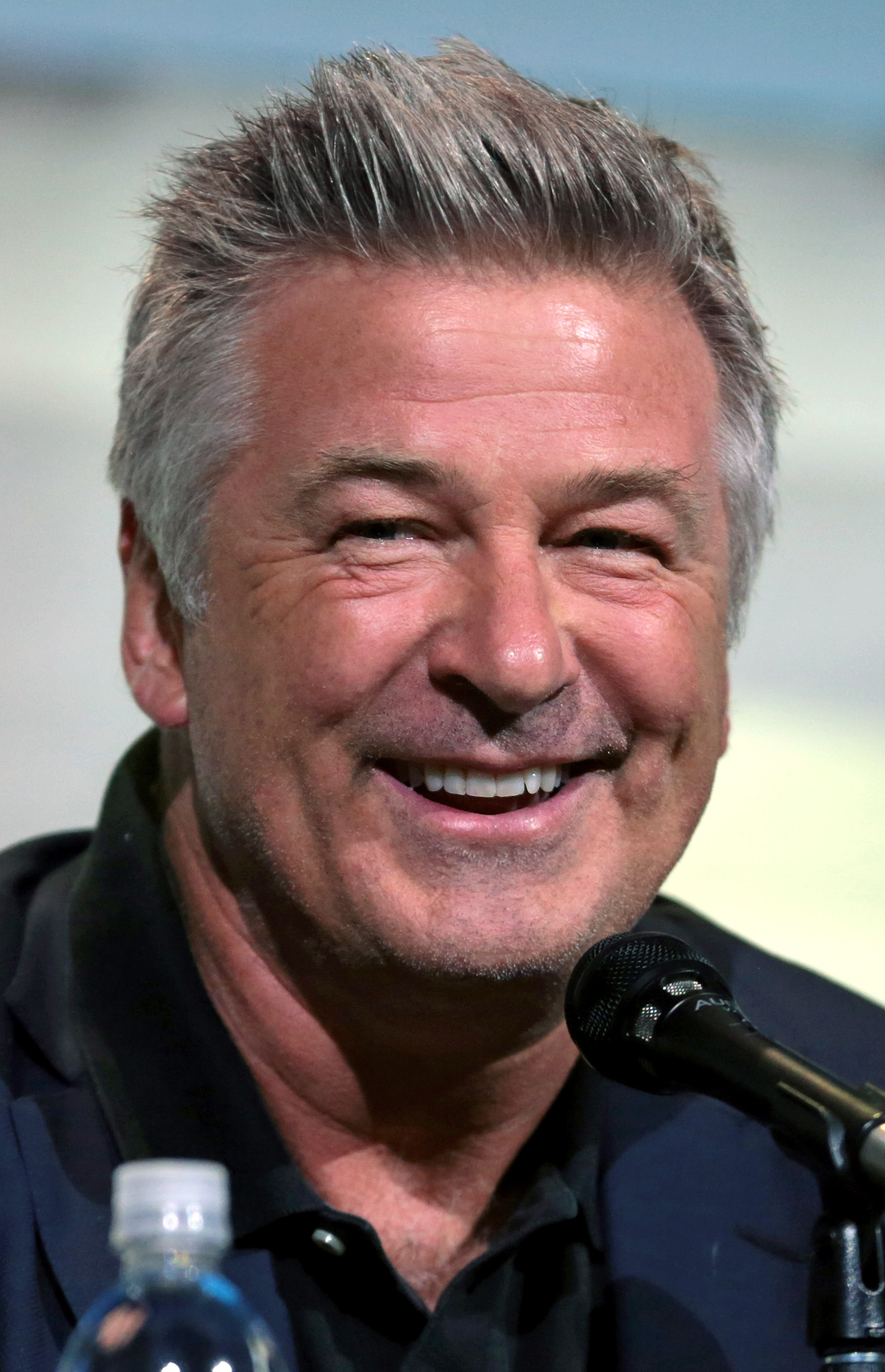
Alec Baldwin

- April 1 – D. Boon, American singer and guitarist (d. 1985)
- April 3
  - Francesca Woodman, American photographer (died 1981)
  - Alec Baldwin, American actor, producer and comedian
- April 4 – Constance Shulman, American actress
- April 12 – Annette McCarthy, American actress (d. 2023)
- April 14 – John D'Aquino, American film and television actor
- April 21 – Andie MacDowell, American actress
- April 26 – Giancarlo Esposito, Italian-American actor
- April 28 – Hal Sutton, American golfer
- April 29
  - Michelle Pfeiffer, American actress
  - Eve Plumb, American actress

=== May ===
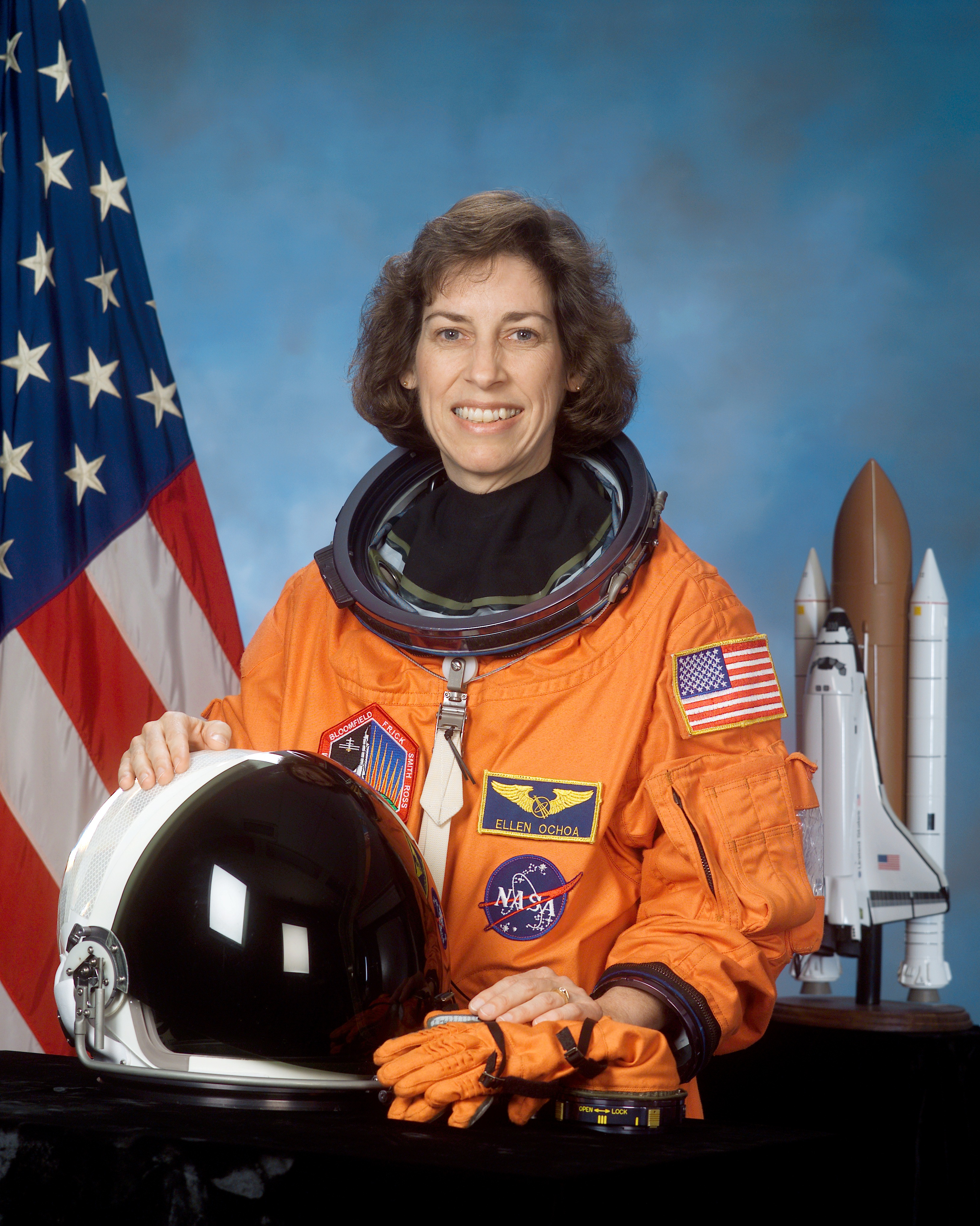
Ellen Ochoa

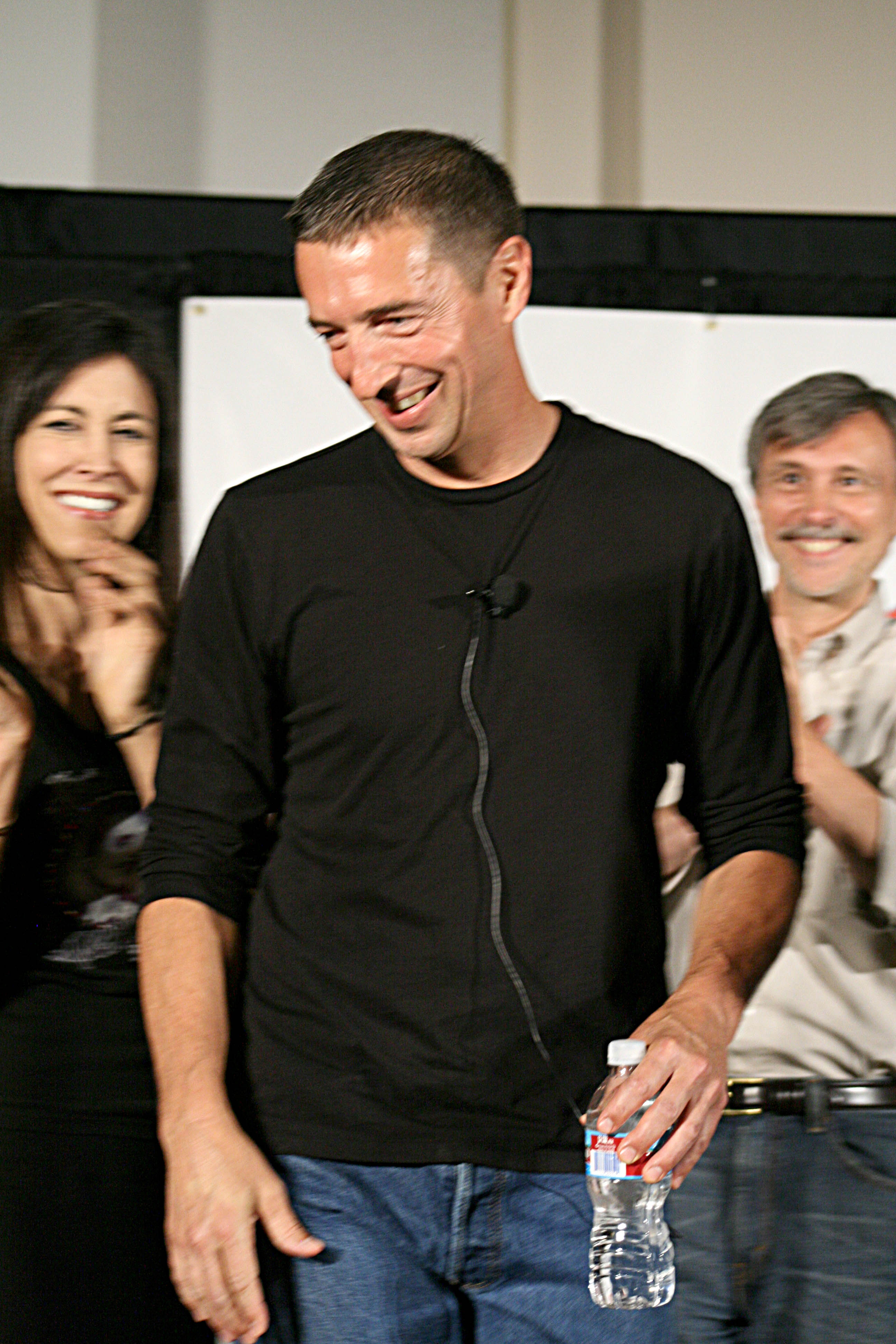
Ron Reagan

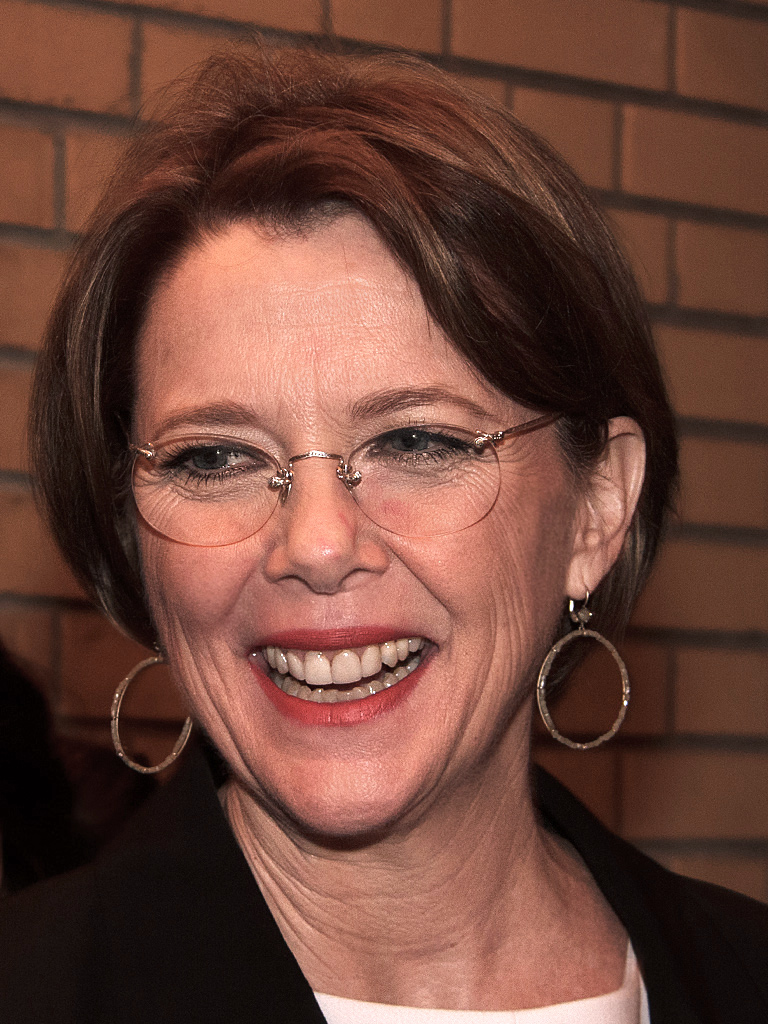
Annette Bening

- May 1 – Nick Stellino, Italian-born American chef and author
- May 4 – Keith Haring, artist (d. 1990)
- May 7 – William Ridenour, politician
- May 8 – Lovie Smith, American football player and coach
- May 10
  - Rick Santorum, politician
  - Ellen Ochoa, astronaut, first Hispanic woman to go into space
- May 11
  - Christian Brando, actor and eldest child of Marlon Brando (d. 2008)
  - Walt Terrell, baseball player
- May 12
  - Jennifer Hetrick, actress
  - Tony Oliver, voice actor
  - Eric Singer, rock drummer
- May 15 – Ron Simmons, professional wrestler
- May 17 – Amp Fiddler, African-American singer/songwriter (d. 2023)
- May 19 – Jenny Durkan, politician
- May 20
  - Ron Reagan, political pundit and son of U.S. president Ronald Reagan
  - Jane Wiedlin, musician and actress
- May 21 – Tom Feeney, politician
- May 23
  - Mitch Albom, author
  - Drew Carey, comedian and actor
  - Lea DeLaria, comedian and actress
- May 25 – Carrie Newcomer, singer-songwriter & musician
- May 26 – Margaret Colin, actress
- May 27
  - Linnea Quigley, actress
  - Wayne Williams, murderer and suspected serial killer
- May 28 – Ric Edelman, investor and author
- May 29 – Annette Bening, actress
- May 30 – Ted McGinley, actor

=== June ===
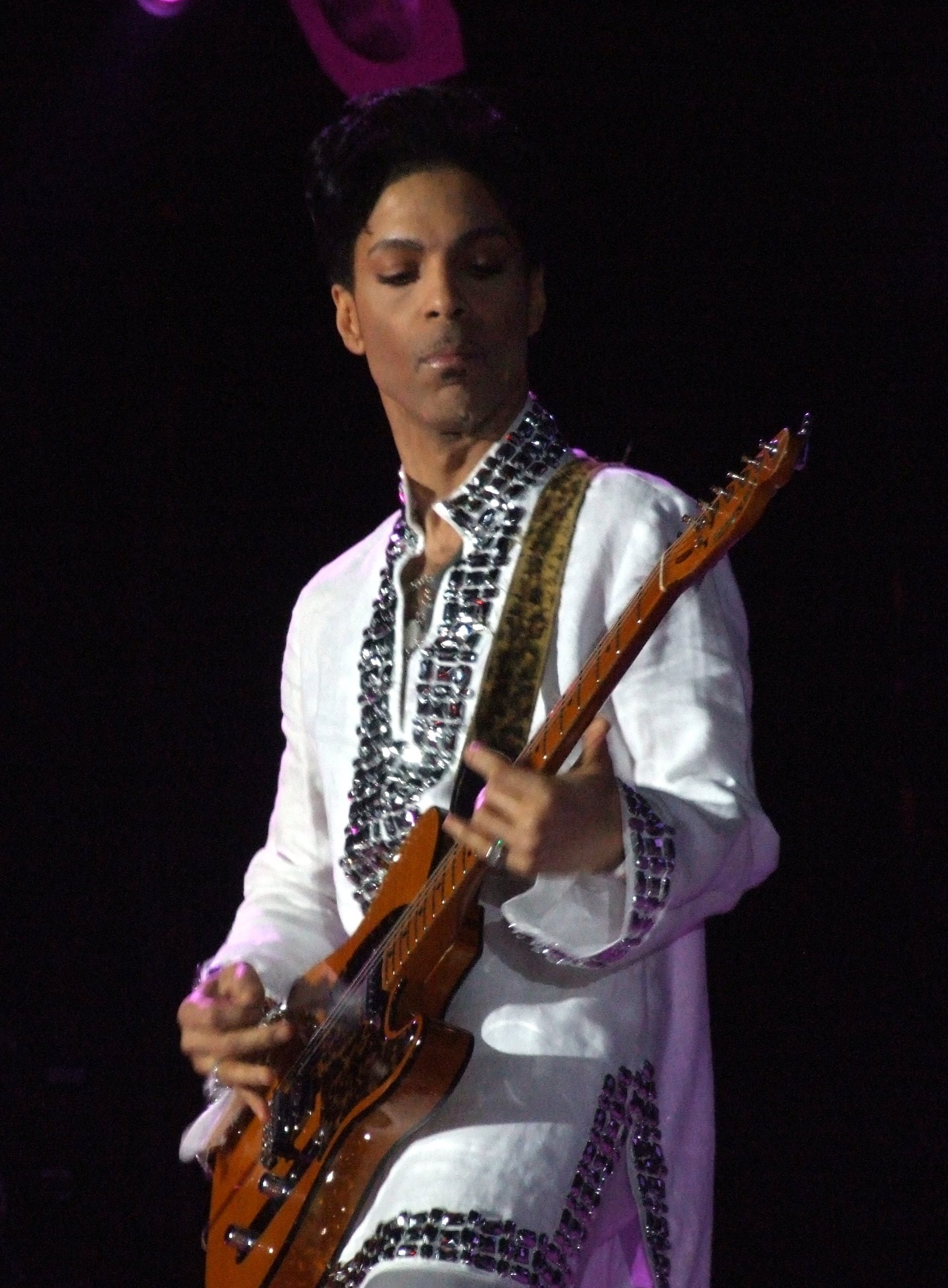
Prince

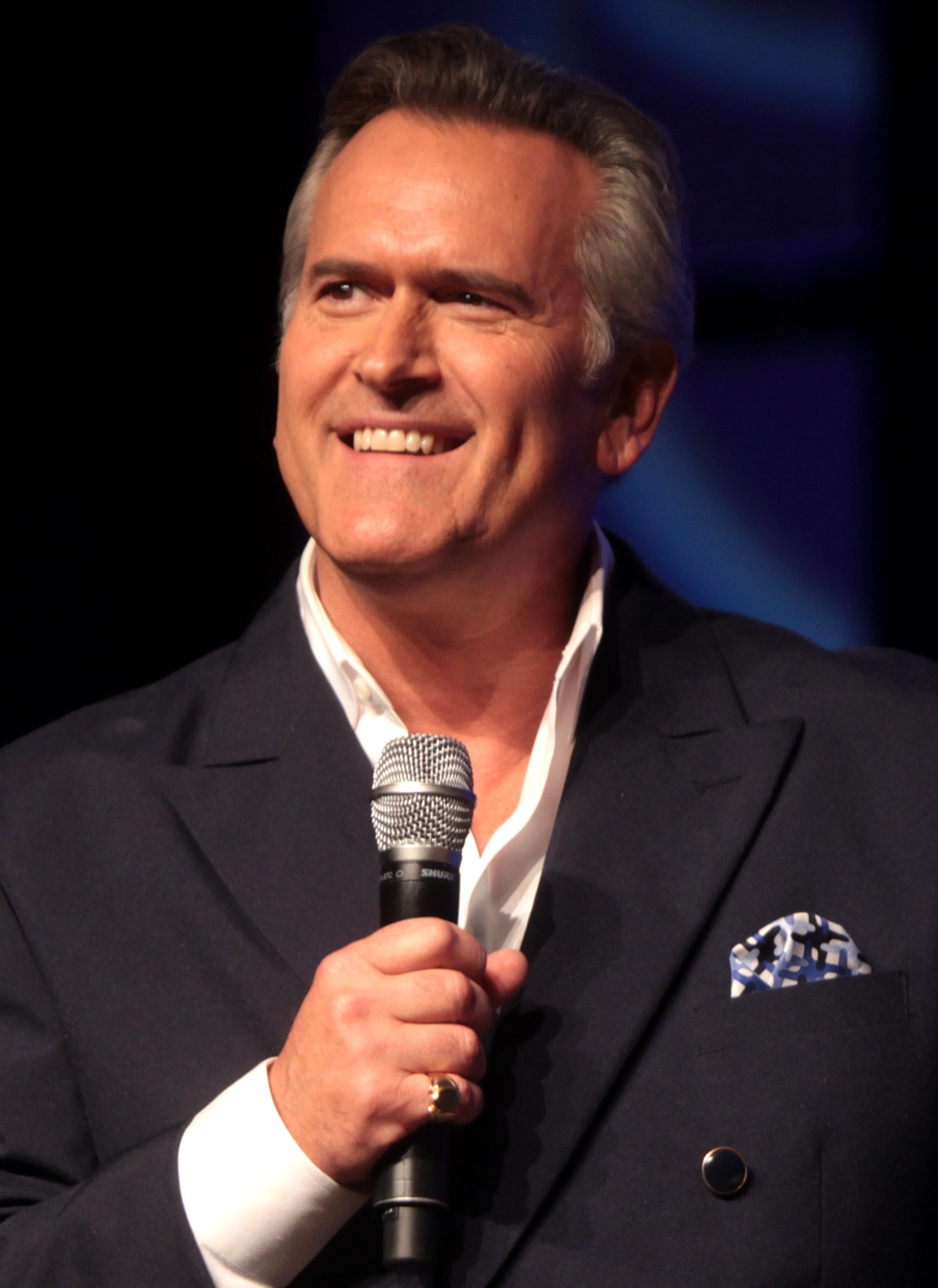
Bruce Campbell

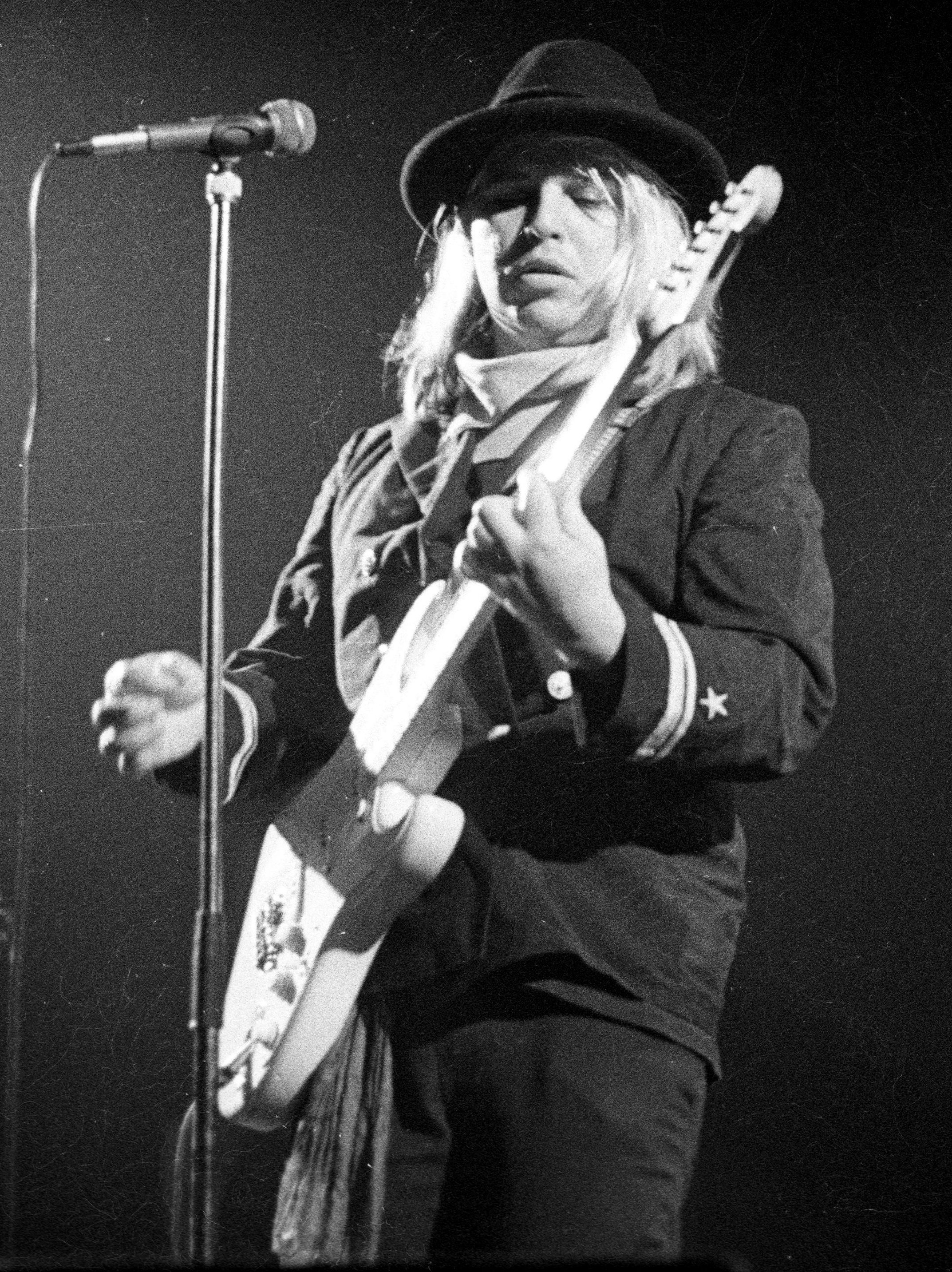
Jeffrey Lee Pierce

- June 2
  - Lex Luger, former American professional wrestler
  - Brian Regan, American stand-up comedian
- June 4 – Gordon P. Robertson, American televangelist and son of Pat Robertson
- June 5
  - Ahmed Abdallah Mohamed Sambi, Comoroan businessman and politician, President of Comoros
  - Eric Strobel, American professional ice hockey player
  - Warren Thomas, American comedian (d. 2005)
- June 7 – Prince, born Prince Rogers Nelson, African-American rock musician (d. 2016)
- June 8
  - Cyril O'Reilly, American actor
  - Keenen Ivory Wayans, African-American comedian, actor, and director
- June 9 – Tony Horwitz, American journalist and author (d. 2019)
- June 10 – James F. Conant, American philosopher
- June 11 – Tim Draper, American venture capitalist
- June 12
  - Rebecca Holden, American actress, singer, and entertainer
  - Meredith Brooks, American singer, songwriter and guitarist
- June 14
  - Eric Heiden, American speed skater
  - Pamela Geller, American activist and blogger
- June 15 – Wade Boggs, American baseball player
- June 17 – Jello Biafra, American punk musician and activist
- June 20
  - Ron Hornaday Jr., American race car driver
  - Chuck Wagner, American actor
- June 21 – Eric Douglas, American actor (d. 2004)
- June 22
  - Bruce Campbell, American actor, producer, writer and director
- June 24
  - John Tortorella, American ice hockey coach
  - Tom Lister Jr., American actor and professional wrestler (d. 2020)
- June 26 – Glen Stewart Godwin, American fugitive and convicted murderer
- June 27 – Jeffrey Lee Pierce, American musician (d. 1996)
- June 29 – Jeff Coopwood, American actor, broadcaster and singer
- June 30 – Tommy Keene, American singer-songwriter (d. 2017)

=== July ===
- July 2 – Thomas Bickerton, Methodist bishop
- July 3 – Aaron Tippin, singer
- July 5 – Bill Watterson, cartoonist and the author of the comic strip Calvin and Hobbes
- July 8 – Kevin Bacon, actor
- July 11 – Stephanie Dabney, ballerina (d. 2022)
- July 13
  - Roger L. Jackson, voice actor
  - Dan Schachte, hockey linesman (d. 2022)
- July 15 – Mac Thornberry, politician
- July 16
  - Mick Cornett, politician
  - Michael Flatley, American-Irish dancer and choreographer
  - Mike Rogers, politician
- July 20 – Billy Mays, salesman (d. 2009)

=== August ===
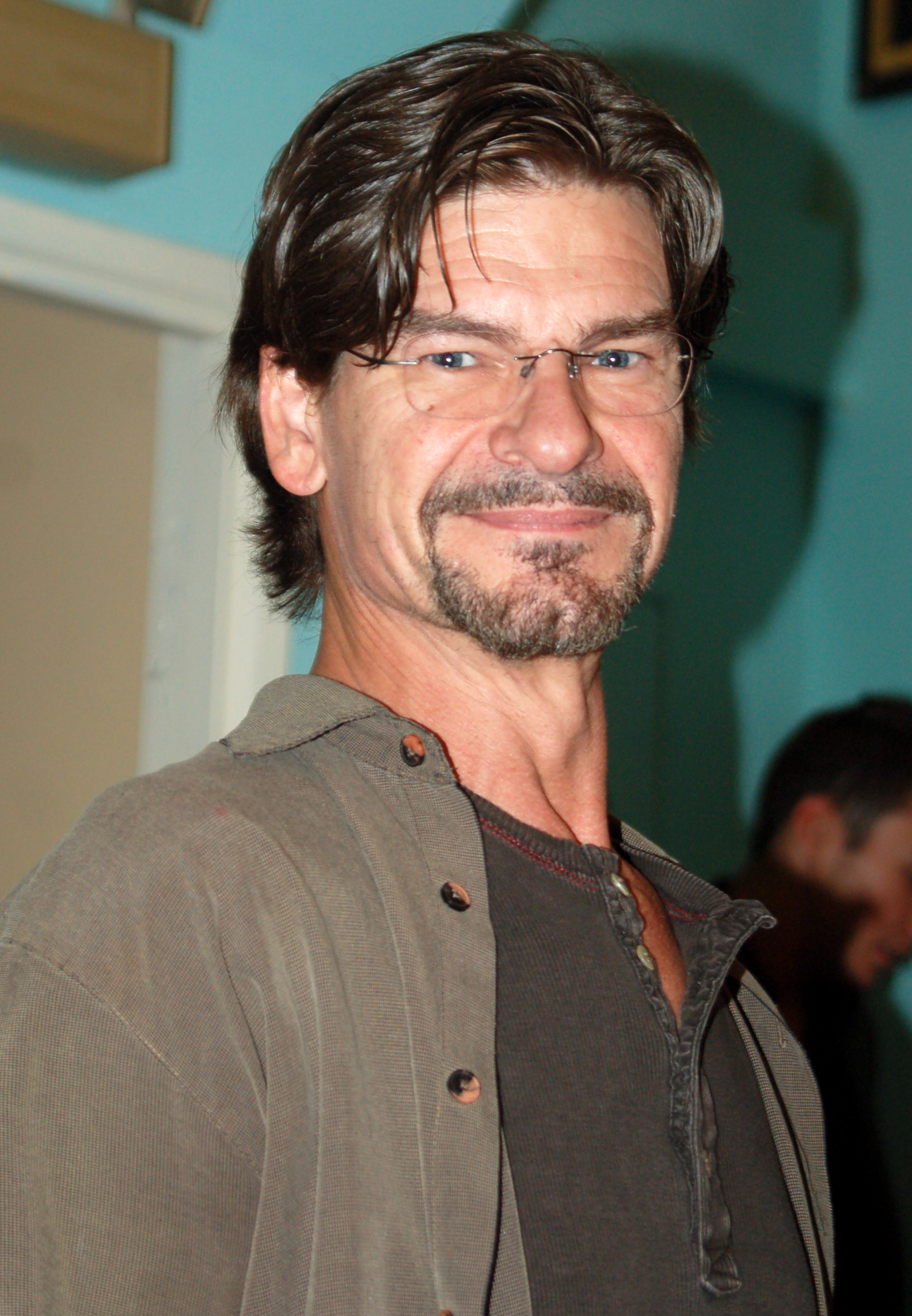
Don Swayze

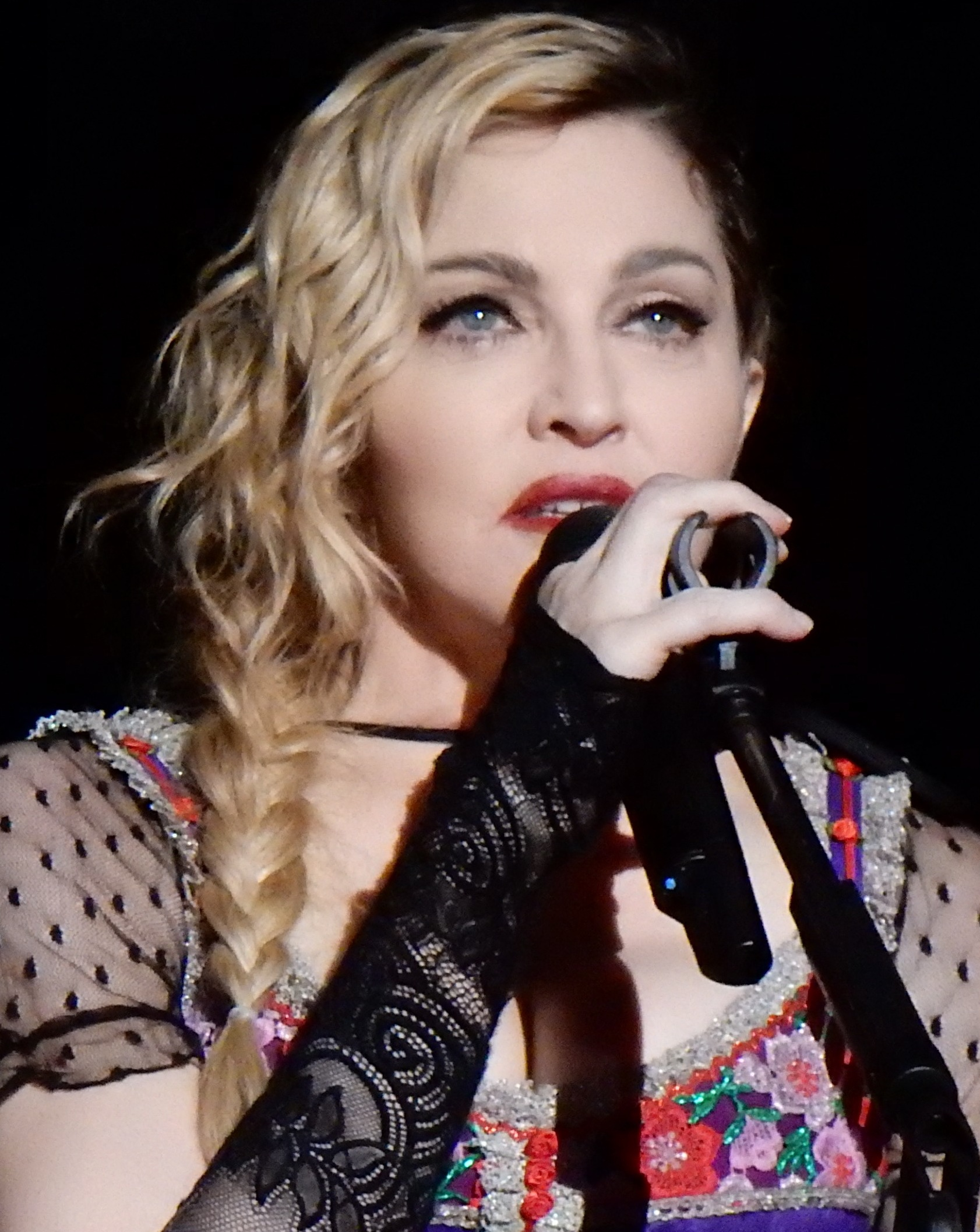
Madonna

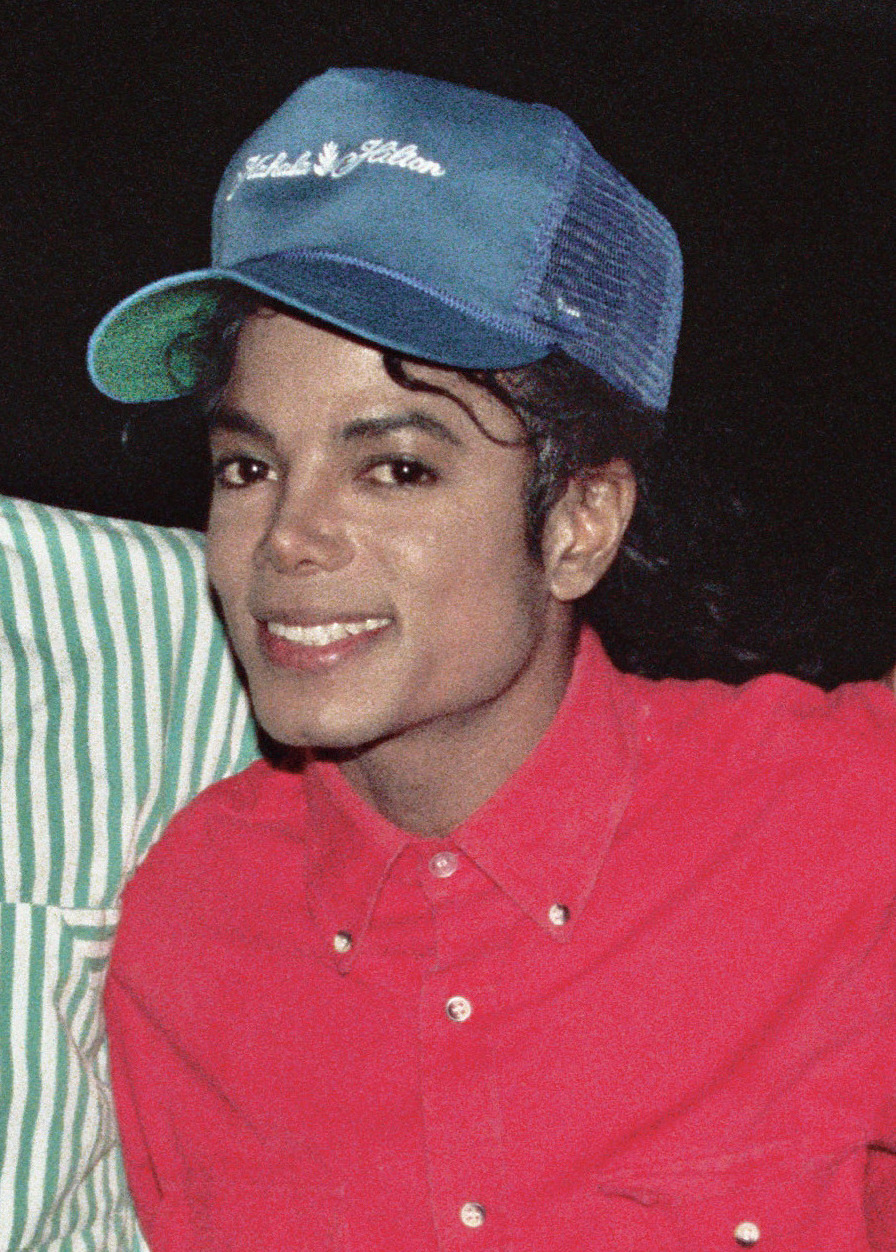
Michael Jackson

- August 1 – Michael Penn, singer
- August 7
  - Buddy Dyer, politician
  - Russell Baze, Canadian/American champion jockey
- August 10 – Don Swayze, actor
- August 13 – Lizzie Grey, musician (d. 2019)
- August 15 – Rondell Sheridan, actor
- August 16
  - Angela Bassett, African-American screen actress and film director
  - Madonna, born Madonna Louise Ciccone, pop singer and performer
- August 17 – Belinda Carlisle, pop rock singer
- August 18
  - Reg E. Cathey, African-American actor (d. 2018)
  - Madeleine Stowe, actress
- August 19
  - Anthony Muñoz, American football player
  - Rick Snyder, politician
- August 20 – Michael Silka, spree killer (d. 1984)
- August 22
  - Brady Boone, professional wrestler (d. 1998)
  - Colm Feore, American-born Canadian actor
- August 24 – Steve Guttenberg, American actor
- August 25
  - Tim Burton, film director
  - Christian LeBlanc, actor
- August 26 – Billy Ray Irick, convicted murderer (d. 2018)
- August 28 – Colm Feore, American-Canadian actor
- August 29 – Michael Jackson, African-American singer and musician (d. 2009)
- August 31 – Julie Brown, actress

=== September ===
- September 4 – Drew Pinsky, celebrity doctor
- September 6 – Jeff Foxworthy, comedian
- September 10 – Chris Columbus, film director, writer, and producer
- September 11
  - Brad Lesley, baseball player (died 2013)
  - Scott Patterson, actor
  - Phoef Sutton, screenwriter and producer
- September 15 – Wendie Jo Sperber, actress (died 2005)
- September 16
  - Orel Hershiser, baseball player
  - Jennifer Tilly, Canadian-American actress
- September 18 – Jeff Bostic, American football player
- September 22 – Joan Jett, rock musician
- September 23 – Marvin Lewis, American football coach
- September 24 – Kevin Sorbo, actor
- September 25 – Michael Madsen, American actor
- September 26
  - Darby Crash, rock songwriter, singer (Germs) (died 1980)
  - Dan Foster, radio host (died 2020)
- September 27 – Shaun Cassidy, actor, producer and screenwriter
- September 30 – Marty Stuart, singer

=== October ===
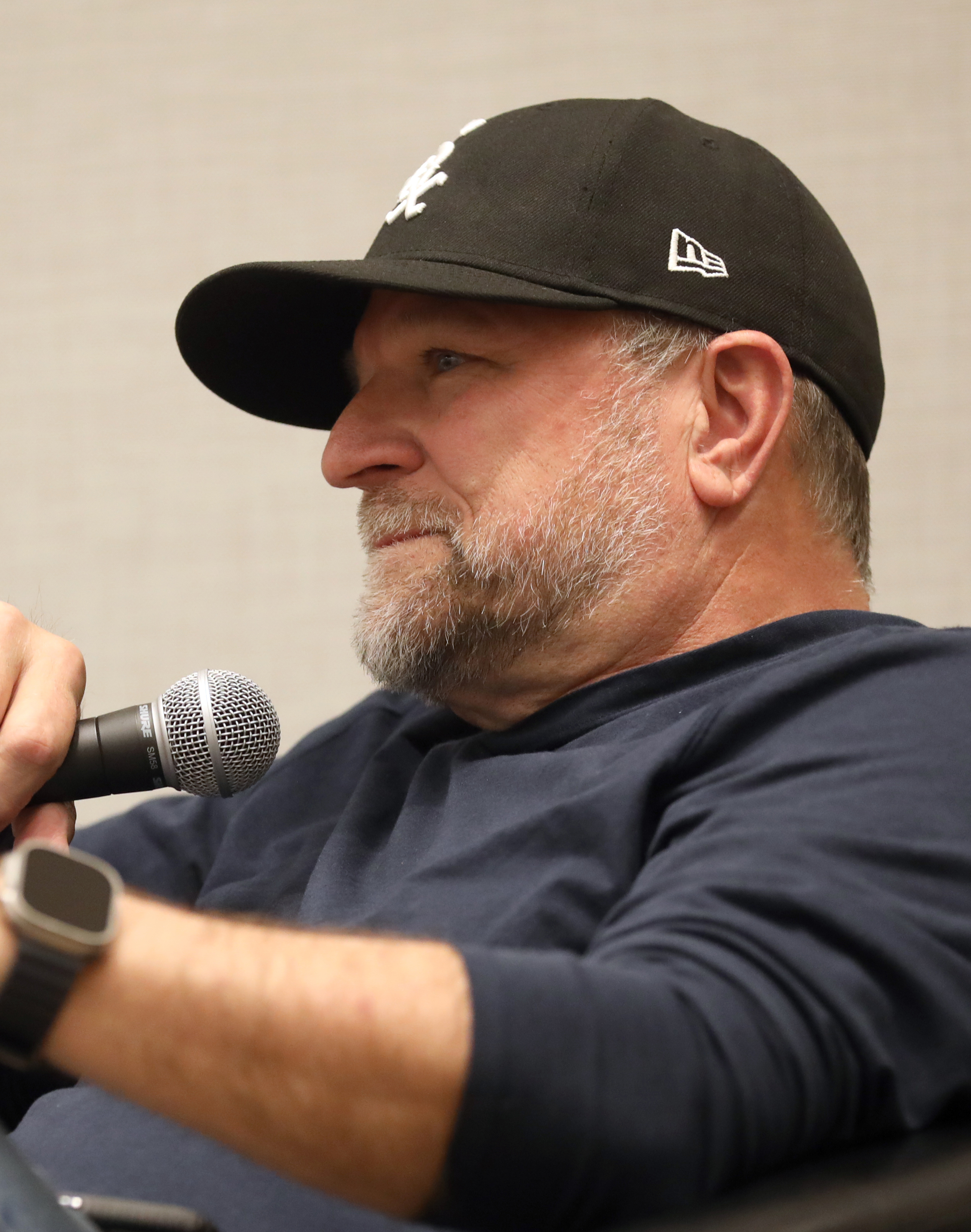
Ned Luke

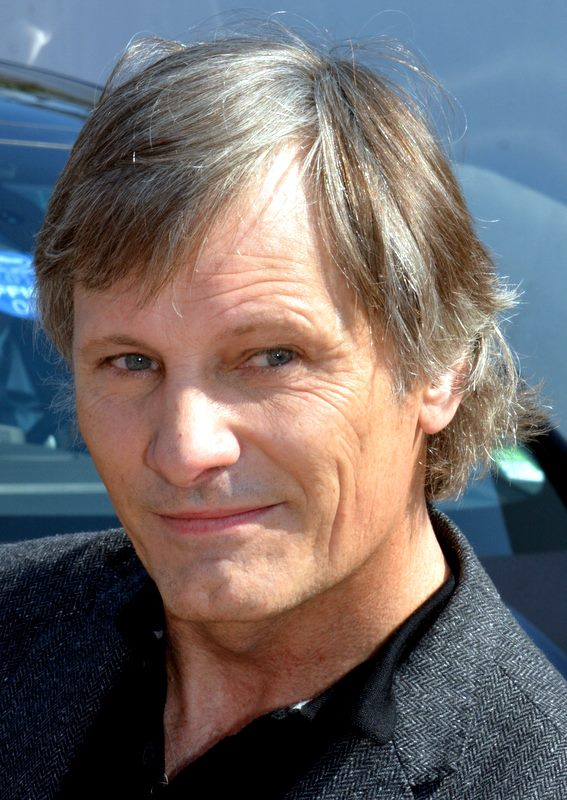
Viggo Mortensen

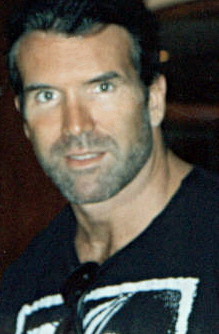
Scott Hall

- October 3 – Daryl Sconiers, baseball player
- October 4
  - Ned Luke, actor
  - Wendy Makkena, actress
- October 5 – Neil deGrasse Tyson, African-American astrophysicist
- October 9 – Michael Paré, actor
- October 10 – Tanya Tucker, singer
- October 13 – Maria Cantwell, politician
- October 15 – Eddie Gossage, American motorsport promoter (died 2024)
- October 16 – Tim Robbins, actor and director
- October 17 – Alan Jackson, country singer and songwriter
- October 18 – Letitia James, lawyer, activist and politician
- October 20
  - Scott Hall, professional wrestler (died 2022)
  - Viggo Mortensen, Danish-American actor
- October 22 – Keena Turner, American football player
- October 24
  - Vincent K. Brooks, general
  - Chip Hooper, tennis player and coach

=== November ===
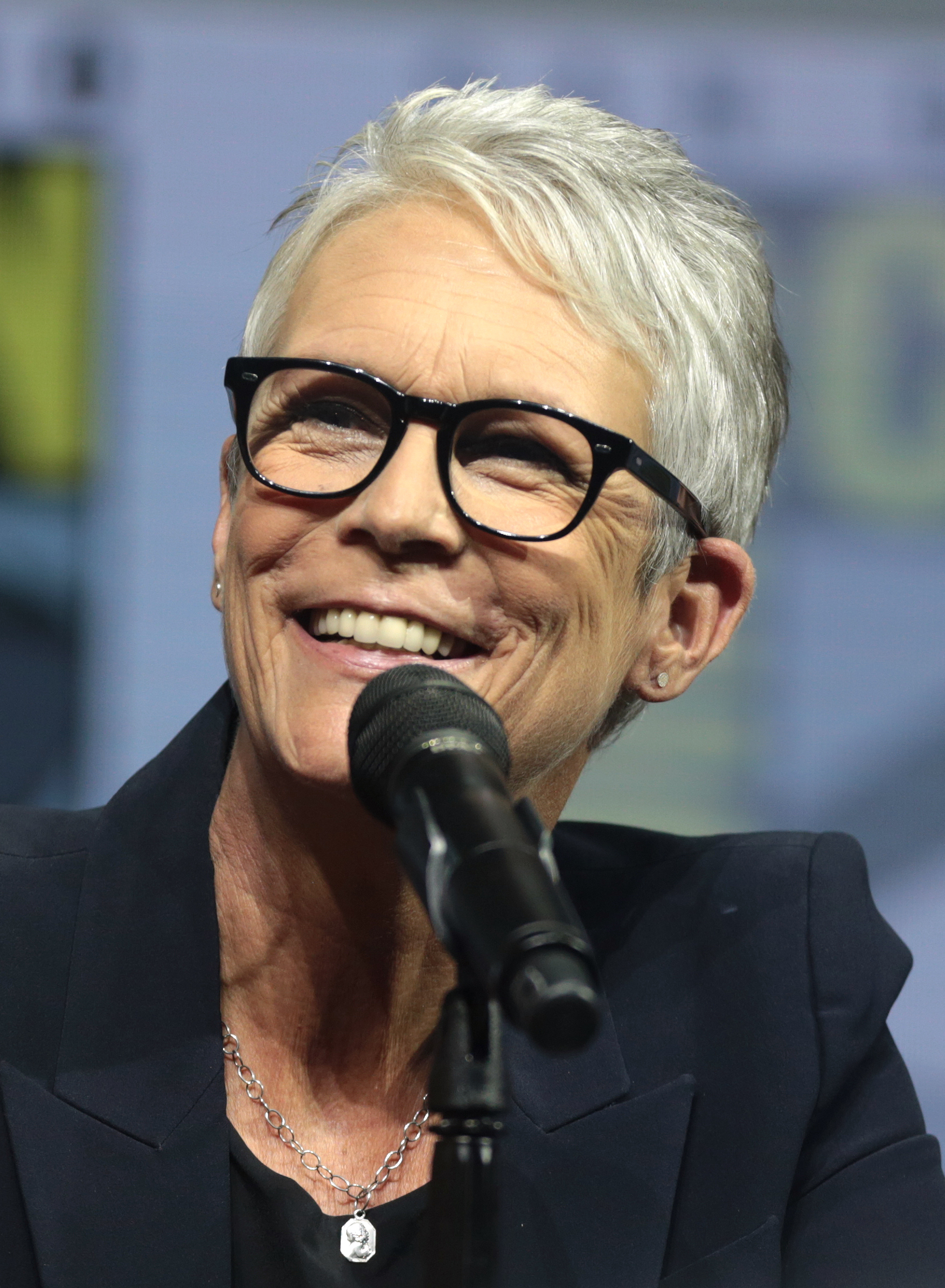
Jamie Lee Curtis

- November 2 – Willie McGee, African-American baseball player
- November 5 – Robert Patrick, American actor
- November 8 – Jeff Speakman, American actor and martial artist
- November 12 – Megan Mullally, American actress, singer and media personality
- November 16 – Marg Helgenberger, American actress
- November 17 – Mary Elizabeth Mastrantonio, American actress and singer
- November 18
  - Oscar Nunez, Cuban-American actor and comedian
  - Kath Weston, American anthropologist, author and academic
- November 19 – Michael Wilbon, American sportswriter
- November 22 – Jamie Lee Curtis, American actress and author
- November 24 – Tony Fitzpatrick, American artist (d. 2025)
- November 25 – Darlanne Fluegel, American actress
- November 28 – Dave Righetti, American baseball player
- November 30 – Stacey Q, American singer & actress

=== December ===
- December 1 – Charlene Tilton, American actress
- December 6 – Debbie Rowe, American ex-wife of Michael Jackson
- December 7 – Rick Rude, American pro wrestler (died 1999)
- December 11
  - Tom Shadyac, American director and producer
  - Nikki Sixx, rock musician
  - Isabella Hofmann, actress
- December 13 – Lynn-Holly Johnson, American ice skater and actress
- December 17 – Donald Payne Jr., American politician (died 2024)
- December 22 – Lenny von Dohlen, American actor (d. 2022)
- December 25
  - Hanford Dixon, American football player
  - Rickey Henderson, African-American baseball player (died 2024)
  - Cheryl Chase, American voice actress and singer
- December 28
  - Twila Paris, Christian musician
  - Joe Diffie, country singer (died 2020)
- December 31
  - Johnny Hardwick, American comedian and actor (died 2023)
  - Bebe Neuwirth, American actress

=== Full date unknown ===
- Karl Fields, university professor
- John M. Martinis, physicist, winner of the Nobel Prize in Physics.

== Deaths ==
=== January ===
- January 1
  - Archie Alexander, designer (born 1888)
  - William T. Bovie, biophysicist and inventor (born 1882)
  - Edward Weston, photographer (born 1886)
- January 6 – Lois Irene Marshall, wife of Thomas R. Marshall, Second Lady of the United States (born 1873)
- January 8 – Mary Colter, architect and designer (born 1869)
- January 13
  - Jesse L. Lasky, film producer (born 1880)
  - Edna Purviance, silent film actress (born 1895)

=== February ===
- February 1 – Clinton Davisson, physicist, winner of the Nobel Prize in Physics in 1937 (born 1888)
- February 4
  - Monta Bell, actor and director (born 1891)
  - Henry Kuttner, author (born 1915)
- February 7 – Walter Kingsford, English actor (born 1881)
- February 13 – Helen Twelvetrees, actress (born 1908)
- February 15 – Philip Van Zandt, Dutch-American actor (born 1904)
- February 17 – Marguerite Snow, actress (born 1889)
- February 20 – Thurston Hall, actor (born 1882)
- February 27 – Harry Cohn, film producer (born 1891)

=== March ===
- March 2 – John Held Jr., cartoonist, printmaker, illustrator, sculptor, and author (born 1889)
- March 21 – Cyril M. Kornbluth, writer (born 1923)
- March 22 (in plane crash)
  - Mike Todd, film producer (born 1909)
  - Art Cohn, screenwriter (born 1909)
- March 23 – Charlotte Walker, actress (born 1876)
- March 25 – Tom Brown, jazz musician (born 1888)
- March 28
  - W. C. Handy, African American blues composer (born 1873)
  - Chuck Klein, baseball player (born 1904)

=== April ===
- April 2 – Michael MacDonald, unseen subject of "Tragedy by the Sea" (b. 1952)
- April 10 – Chuck Willis, singer-songwriter (born 1926)
- April 13 – Henry F. Phillips, businessman and inventor (born 1889)
- April 15 – Estelle Taylor, actress (born 1894)

=== May ===
- May 5 – James Branch Cabell, fantasy writer (born 1879)
- May 19 – Ronald Colman, English-born actor (born 1891)
- May 20 – James Dole, food industrialist (born 1877)

=== June ===
- June 2
  - Townsend Cromwell, oceanographer (plane crash) (born 1922)
  - Bell M. Shimada, fisheries scientist (plane crash) (born 1922)
- June 4 – Katherine MacDonald, actress, producer, and model (born 1891)
- June 6
  - Lloyd Hughes, actor (born 1897)
  - Virginia Pearson, actress (born 1886)
- June 10 – Angelina Weld Grimke, African American lesbian journalist and poet (born 1880)
- June 21
  - Herbert Brenon, film director (born 1880)
  - Robert L. Ghormley, admiral (born 1883)

=== July ===
- July 9 – James H. Flatley, naval aviator and admiral (born 1906)
- July 11 – Evelyn Varden, actress (born 1893)
- July 20 – Franklin Pangborn, actor (born 1889)
- July 24 – Mabel Ballin, actress (born 1887)
- July 25 – Harry Warner, studio executive (born 1881)
- July 26
  - Iven Carl Kincheloe Jr., Korean War fighter ace and test pilot (born 1928)
  - Eugene Millikin, U.S. Senator from Colorado from 1941 to 1957 (born 1891)
- July 27 – Claire Lee Chennault, military aviator (born 1893)
- July 30 – William A. Glassford, admiral (born 1886)

=== August ===
- August 1 – Albert E. Smith, stage magician, film director, and producer (born 1875)
- August 8 – Barbara Bennett, actress and film dancer (born 1906)
- August 12 – Augustus Owsley Stanley, politician (born 1867)
- August 14 – Big Bill Broonzy, African American blues singer-songwriter (born 1893)
- August 21
  - Kurt Neumann, film director (born 1908)
  - Walter Schumann, composer (born 1913)
- August 27
  - Ernest Lawrence, nuclear physicist, winner of the Nobel Prize in Physics in 1939 (born 1901)
  - Priscilla Lawson, actress (born 1914)
- August 29 – Marjorie Flack, artist, illustrator and writer (born 1897)

=== September ===
- September 15 – Snuffy Stirnweiss, baseball player (born 1918)
- September 16 – Alma Bennett, actress (born 1904)
- September 25 – John B. Watson, psychologist (born 1878)
- September 27 – Rose Stradner, Austrian actress (born 1913)

=== October ===
- October 7 – Louise Hammond Willis Snead, artist, writer, and composer (born 1868)
- October 9 – John Boland, South Dakota politician (born 1884)
- October 15 – Jack Norton, actor (born 1882)
- October 17 – Paul Outerbridge, photographer (born 1896)
- October 20 – Emmett Lynn, actor (born 1897)
- October 27 – Marshall Neilan, actor and director (born 1891)
- October 26 – Herbert A. Bartholomew, farmer and politician (born 1871)
- October 29 – Zoë Akins, playwright, poet and author (born 1886)
- October 31 – Tom Pittman, actor (born 1932)

=== November ===
- November 15
  - Samuel Hopkins Adams, writer (born 1871)
  - Tyrone Power, actor (born 1914)
- November 21
  - Mel Ott, baseball player (born 1909)
  - Lion Feuchtwanger, German-American novelist and playwright (born 1884)
- November 23 – Johnston McCulley, writer (born 1883)
- November 24 – Harry Parke, comedian (born 1904)
- November 25 – Charles F. Kettering, inventor, engineer, and businessman (born 1876)
- November 30 – Oscar C. Badger II, admiral (born 1890)

=== December ===
- December 1 – Boots Mallory, actress (born 1913)
- December 13 – Tim Moore, comedian (born 1887)
- December 23 – Henry "Son" Sims, Delta blues fiddler and songwriter (born 1890)
- December 29 – Doris Humphrey, dancer and choreographer (born 1895)

== See also ==
- List of American films of 1958
- Timeline of United States history (1950–1969)
