= Kenneth Arnold =

American aviator and businessman (1915–1984)

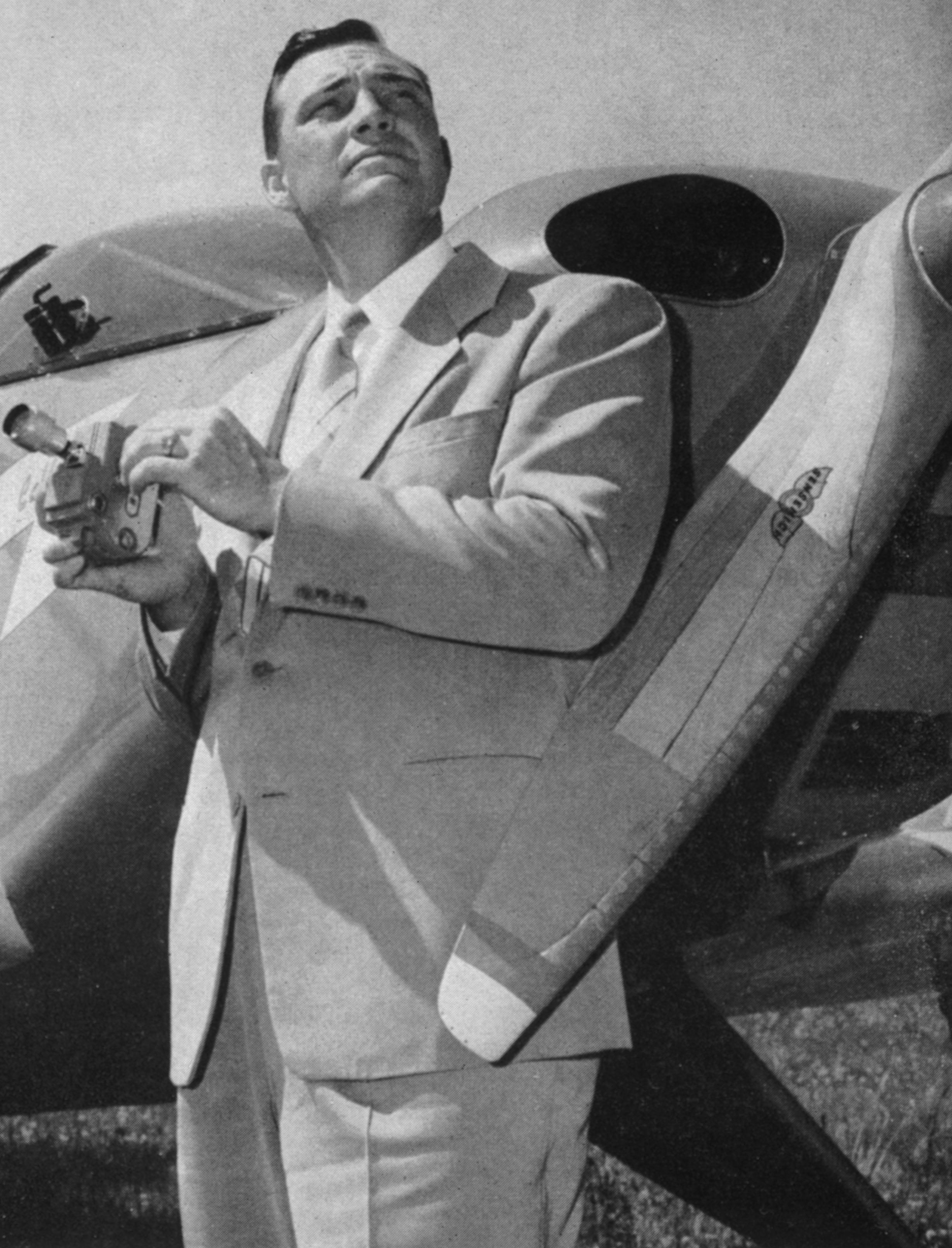
- Arnold c. 1947
- Born: March 29, 1915; Sebeka, Minnesota, US
- Died: January 16, 1984 (aged 68); Bellevue, Washington, US
- Education: University of Minnesota
- Occupations: Businessman, aviator

Kenneth Albert Arnold (March 29, 1915 – January 16, 1984) was an American aviator, businessman, and politician.

Arnold is known best for reporting what is generally considered the first widely publicized modern sighting of unidentified flying objects (UFOs) in the United States, after claiming to have seen nine silver-colored objects flying in unison near Mount Rainier, Washington on June 24, 1947. After his alleged sighting, Arnold began investigating reports of UFOs, writing and speaking about the topic for several years afterward.

In 1962, Arnold won the Republican Party's nomination for Lieutenant Governor of Idaho, losing the election of the same year.

== Biography of Arnold ==
Arnold was born on March 29, 1915, in Sebeka, Minnesota. He grew up in Scobey, Montana. He was an Eagle Scout and all-state football player in high school. He attended the University of Minnesota in 1934–35. His family was of Lutheran faith.

In 1938, he began work for Red Comet, manufacturer of automatic firefighting equipment. He was promoted to district manager the next year. In 1940, Arnold started his own company, the Great Western Fire Control Supply in Boise, Idaho, which sold and installed fire suppression systems, a job that took him around the Pacific Northwest.

In 1941, Arnold divorced his first wife, Lillian, and married Doris Lowe (1918–1990); they had four daughters.

== Role in UFO phenomena ==
=== Kenneth Arnold's 1947 UFO sighting ===
On June 24, 1947, Kenneth Arnold claimed that he saw a series of nine, shiny unidentified flying objects flying past Mount Rainier at speeds that Arnold estimated at a minimum of 1,200 miles an hour (1,932 km/h). This was the first post-World War II sighting in the United States that garnered nationwide news coverage and is credited with being the first of the modern era of UFO sightings, including numerous reported sightings during the next two to three weeks. Arnold's description of the objects also resulted in the press soon inventing the terms flying saucer and flying disc as popular descriptive terms for UFOs.

=== Investigation of Maury Island UFO "hoax" ===
After the 1947 UFO sighting, Arnold became famous "practically overnight". Arnold's daughter would later recall the family receiving 10,000 letters and constant telephone calls.

Arnold was contacted by Raymond A. Palmer, editor of science fiction magazine Amazing Stories, who asked Arnold to investigate the story of two harbormen in Tacoma who reportedly possessed fragments of a "flying saucer". Palmer sent $200 to fund the investigation.

On July 29, Arnold interviewed a harborman who claimed that one of the objects "began spewing forth what seemed like thousands of newspapers from somewhere on the inside of its center. These newspapers, which turned out to be a white type of very lightweight metal, fluttered to earth". The harborman claimed the craft emitted a substance resembling lava rocks that fell onto his boat, breaking a worker's arm and killing a dog.

Arnold interviewed Fred Crisman, an associate of the harborman, who reported having recovered debris from Maury Island in Puget Sound and having witnessed an unusual craft. Crisman showed "white metal" debris to Arnold, who interpreted it as mundane and inconsistent with the harborman's description.

Arnold contacted the Air Force, and two officers arrived to investigate. The officers performed interviews, collected the fragments, and took off in their airplane. While returning to their base in California, during the early hours of August 1, the two officers died when the B-25 Mitchell airplane they were piloting crashed outside of Kelso, Washington.

Writing in 1956, Air Force officer Edward J. Ruppelt would conclude "The whole Maury Island Mystery was a hoax. The first, possibly the second-best, and the dirtiest hoax in the UFO history." Ruppelt observed:

The government had thought seriously of prosecuting the men. At the last minute it was decided, after talking to the two men, that the hoax was a harmless joke that had mushroomed, and that the loss of two lives and a B-25 could not be directly blamed on the two men.

=== Aftermath ===
Arnold was involved with interviewing other UFO witnesses or contactees (notably, he investigated the claims of Samuel Eaton Thompson, one of the first alleged contactees).

In spring 1948, Arnold and Science Fiction editor Raymond Palmer collaborated on an article titled "I Did See The Flying Disks", based on Arnold's sighting. In 1950, Arnold self-published a 16-page booklet titled "The Flying Saucer As I Saw It". In 1948, he authored "Are Space Visitors Here?" and "Phantom Lights in Nevada".

On April 7, 1950, broadcaster Edward R. Murrow interviewed Arnold, who stated that since June 1947 he had had three additional sightings of nine spacecraft.

In January 1951, Cosmopolitan magazine published an article titled "The Disgraceful Flying Saucer Hoax", which accused Arnold of "[igniting] a chain reaction of mass hypnotism and fraud that has taken on the guise of a prolonged 'Martian Invasion' broadcast by that bizarre hambone Orson Welles".

In 1952, Arnold and Palmer authored The Coming of the Saucers.

Reportedly, Arnold came to believe he had experienced seven additional sightings, one of which involved a transparent saucer he likened to a jellyfish. By 1955, he began to promote the space animal hypothesis when he suggested that the UFOs are "sort of like sky jellyfish". Arnold added: "My theory might sound funny, but just remember that there are a lot of things in nature that we don't know yet". In 1962, he argued "the so-called unidentified flying objects that have been seen in our atmosphere are not spaceships from another planet at all, but are groups and masses of living organisms that are as much a part of our atmosphere and space as the life we find in the oceans".

In 2012, daughter Kim Arnold explained that her family had felt threatened to speak about the topic.

== Political career and later life ==
In 1962, Kenneth Arnold announced plans to campaign for Governor of Idaho, and won the Republican nomination for the 1962 Idaho lieutenant gubernatorial election; in the election, Arnold lost to incumbent Democrat William Drevlow. In 1964, Arnold publicly campaigned for Republican presidential nominee Barry Goldwater, flying an airplane painted with Goldwater '64 slogan "Au-H2O-64".

1962 Idaho lieutenant gubernatorial election
Party	Candidate	Votes	%
Democratic	William Drevlow (incumbent)	135,474	54.17
Republican	Kenneth Arnold	114,617	45.83

He appeared at a 1977 convention curated by the magazine Fate to mark the thirtieth anniversary of the beginning of the modern UFO age.

In 1984, Kenneth Arnold, aged 68, died from colorectal cancer at Overlake Hospital in Bellevue, Washington.

== Bibliography ==
- The Real Flying Saucers, Other Worlds (January 1952)
- The Coming of the Saucers (1952) (with Raymond A. Palmer)

== Sources ==
- Arnold, Kenneth; Palmer, Ray (1952), The coming of the saucers: a documentary report on sky objects that have mystified the world, Boise, Wisconsin: Self-published, p. 192, 3021444
- Clark, Jerome, The UFO Encyclopedia: The Phenomenon from the Beginning, Volume 2, A–K, Detroit: Omnigraphics, 1998 (2nd edition, 2005), ISBN 0-7808-0097-4
- Campbell, Steuart, The UFO Mystery Solved, Explicit Books, 1994, ISBN 0-9521512-0-0
- Obituary, Idaho Statesman, January 22, 1984
