= 1962 Idaho lieutenant gubernatorial election =

- November 6, 1962
Nominee	William Drevlow	Kenneth Arnold
Party	Democratic	Republican
Popular vote	135,474	114,617
Percentage	54.17%	45.83%
Lieutenant Governor before election
William Drevlow
Democratic
Elected Lieutenant Governor
William Drevlow
Democratic

The 1962 Idaho lieutenant gubernatorial election was held on November 6, 1962. Democratic incumbent William Drevlow defeated Republican nominee Kenneth Arnold with 54% of the vote.

== Primary elections ==
Primary elections were held on June 5, 1962.

=== Democratic primary ===
Democratic primary results
Party	Candidate	Votes	%
Democratic	William Drevlow (incumbent)	40,975	53.04
Democratic	Russel Larsen	20,935	27.10
Democratic	Ralph Litton	15,344	19.86

=== Republican primary ===
Republican primary results
Party	Candidate	Votes	%
Republican	Kenneth Arnold	32,139	53.03
Republican	A.W. Neagle	28,470	46.97

== General election ==
1962 Idaho lieutenant gubernatorial election
Party	Candidate	Votes	%
Democratic	William Drevlow (incumbent)	135,474	54.17
Republican	Kenneth Arnold	114,617	45.83
