= Pete Cenarrusa =

American politician

Pete T. Cenarrusa
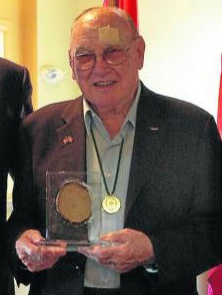
- Cenarrusa in July 2010

25th Secretary of State of Idaho
- In office May 1, 1967 – January 6, 2003
- Governor: Don Samuelson; Cecil Andrus; John Evans; Phil Batt; Dirk Kempthorne
- Preceded by: Edson Deal
- Succeeded by: Ben Ysursa

Member of the Idaho House of Representatives from Blaine County
- In office 1950–1966

Personal details
- Born: Pete Thomas Cenarrusa; December 16, 1917 Carey, Idaho, U.S.
- Died: September 29, 2013 (aged 95) Boise, Idaho, U.S.
- Resting place: Bellevue Cemetery, Bellevue, Idaho
- Party: Republican
- Spouse(s): Freda Coates Cenarrusa (1928– ) (m. 1947)
- Children: 1 son
- Education: University of Idaho (BS)
- Profession: Education, agriculture state government

Military service
- Allegiance: United States
- Branch/service: U.S. Marine Corps
- Years of service: 1942–1945, 1945–1963 (reserve)
- Rank: Major
- Unit: Aviation
- Battles/wars: World War II, Cold War

Pete Thomas Cenarrusa (December 16, 1917 – September 29, 2013) was an American politician from Idaho. He served continuously for over half a century in elective office, first as a member of the Idaho Legislature and then as Secretary of State. He was a member of the Republican Party.

== Early life and education ==
Cenarrusa was born in Carey, Idaho on December 16, 1917. The son of Basque immigrants from Bizkaia, he was a native speaker of the Basque language. Cenarrusa graduated from the territorial school in Bellevue, and attended the University of Idaho in Moscow.

In college, he was a member of the Vandals' boxing team and the Tau Kappa Epsilon fraternity. He graduated with a bachelor's degree in agriculture in 1940 and coached and taught math and science in Carey, Cambridge, and Glenns Ferry. During World War II, Cenarrusa was an aviator in the Marine Corps.

== Political career ==
Cenarrusa was elected to the Idaho House of Representatives from Blaine County in 1950. He served in that capacity for 16 years, including six as speaker of the house.

In 1967, Cenarrusa was appointed Secretary of State by Governor Don Samuelson to fill a vacancy caused by the death of Edson Deal, and took office on May 1.

Cenarussa was elected to a full term in 1970. He was reelected seven times (1974, 1978, 1982, 1986, 1990, 1994, and 1998). Cenarrusa did not run for reelection in 2002, instead supporting his longtime chief deputy, Ben Ysursa. Upon leaving office Cenarrusa was the longest-serving secretary of state in the United States.

Cenarrusa is also the longest-serving elected public official in Idaho history, having held elective office for a total of 52 years.

== Basque advocacy ==
Cenarrusa has been a longtime proponent of increased autonomy in the Basque Country, particularly in Spain. In the 1970s he worked with the Democratic U.S. Senator from Idaho, Frank Church, in an effort to curtail foreign aid to the Franco regime. Cenarrusa has also appealed for clemency for Basque political prisoners in Spain.

In 2003, Pete and Freda Cenarrusa organized the Cenarrusa Foundation for Basque Culture (originally the Cenarrusa Center for Basque Studies), which promotes the culture and history of the Basques by providing resources for performances, presentations and programs and to organizations throughout Idaho and Oregon.

Cenarussa was instrumental in the founding of the Basque Studies Program at Boise State University in 2006.

== Death ==
After a three-year battle with cancer, Cenarrusa died in Boise at age 95. His funeral was at St. John's Cathedral in Boise and he was buried in Blaine County, at the Bellevue Cemetery in Bellevue.

== Legacy ==
A state office building near the state capitol was named for him in 1998. Built in the late-1970s, it is on the site (43.617°N 116.196°W) of the old St. Alphonsus Hospital, which was vacated in 1972 and demolished a few years later. It is opposite the state supreme court building on State Street.

Political offices
Preceded by Edson Deal	Secretary of State of Idaho; May 1, 1967–January 6, 2003	Succeeded by Ben Ysursa
