= Samuel Eaton Thompson =

Samuel Eaton Thompson (1895–1987) was an American contactee (a person who claimed to have been in contact with extraterrestrials). Although his claims earned him little publicity during his lifetime, Thompson might have been the first North American contactee. Researcher Jerome Clark describes the account as "surely the most outlandish story in early UFO history [and] also one of the most obscure". The story earned an 11-paragraph mention in a local newspaper in 1950 (on April 1, leading some to suspect the entire story was a hoax or prank), and the full story was not publicized until more than three decades afterwards.

== Thompson's story ==
A 54-year-old retired railroad worker, Thompson claimed that on the evening of March 28, 1950, while driving to his home in Centralia, Washington, he came across a large flying saucer in the woods. The saucer, he claimed, was about 80 feet (24 m) across and 30 feet (9 m) tall. Two naked, deeply tanned children, human in form but very attractive, were playing near the craft's entrance ramp.

Thompson claimed to have approached to within about 50 feet (15 m) of the saucer, which emitted a strong sun-like heat. Several naked adults – humanoid, attractive, and also deeply tanned – then appeared at the craft's door. After realizing Thompson meant them no harm, they beckoned him closer. The crew consisted of 20 adults and 25 children, the latter from about 5 to 15 years of age.

Thompson claimed to have spent the next 40 hours with the humanoids. They were from Venus, he learned, and had stopped at Earth despite the fact that other Venusian saucers had been shot at by Earth-based military forces. The Venusians said that all of Earth's problems stemmed from astrology: humans were born under different star signs, while Venusians were all born under the sign of Venus, as was Thompson.

The Venusians further claimed, said Thompson, that they were vegetarian, and that they never grew ill. Thompson also claimed the Venusians were naïve and childlike: they did not know who had built their flying saucers, and seemed to possess little to no curiosity.

Thompson claimed that he was the first of many Earthlings who would meet the Venusians, and that after humanity had seen the wisdom of Venusian ways, Jesus Christ would return in 10,000 AD.

Thompson claimed to have stayed on the spaceship until March 30, 1950. He tried to photograph the spaceship, he claimed, but the object was too bright to appear on film as more than a blob of light. He could see the Venusians any time he wanted, but could not tell all the information he had learned from them.

== Publicity ==
Afterwards, pilot Kenneth Arnold – whose 1947 UFO sighting had sparked widespread public interest in UFOs – interviewed Thompson. Although Arnold did not really believe Thompson's story was true, he also had difficulty in accepting that the poorly-educated, seemingly sincere Thompson was a blatant liar or hoaxer. Arnold speculated that Thompson might have had some sort of psychic experience.

In 1980, Arnold donated a copy of his 1950 Thompson interview tape to Fate magazine. Clark's article "The Coming of the Venusians" was published in the January 1981 issue of Fate. Clark speculated that Thompson had had a visionary experience, which was inspired by, and which drew from, UFO folklore and Biblical stories.

== Similarities to other UFO cases ==
Clark noted the Thompson case was similar to an encounter reported during the mystery airship wave of 1897. There are also some similarities between Thompson's story and the far better known account of contactee George Adamski; but Clark argues that it is unlikely that Adamski knew of Thompson.
