= William Deal =

American politician (1936–2024)

Member of the Idaho House of Representatives
- In office 1991 – January 2, 2007
- Succeeded by: Stephen Kren

Director of the Idaho Department of Insurance
- In office January 2, 2007 – December 31, 2014
- Governor: Butch Otter
- Succeeded by: Dean Cameron

Personal details
- Born: William Wallace Deal; December 7, 1936 Boise, Idaho, U.S.
- Died: November 20, 2024 (aged 87) Nampa, Idaho, U.S.
- Party: Republican
- Spouse: Joan Ferris (m. 1958)
- Children: 4
- Relatives: Edson Deal (uncle)
- Education: University of Idaho

William Wallace 'Bill' Deal (December 7, 1936 – November 20, 2024), also known as W.W. Deal, was an American politician. A member of the Republican Party, he served in the Idaho House of Representatives from 1991 to 2007 and as director of the Idaho Department of Insurance from 2007 to 2014.

== Life and career ==
Deal was born in Boise, Idaho, the son of Homer Steeves Deal and Nell Matthews. He was the grandson of Edson Deal, a Idaho lieutenant governor. He attended Boise High School, graduating in 1955. He also attended the University of Idaho, earning his BS degree in business in 1959. After earning his degree, he served in the United States Army from 1959 to 1962. He was a golfer.

Deal served in the Idaho House of Representatives from 1991 to 2007. After his service in the House, Governor Butch Otter appointed Deal to serve as director of the Idaho Department of Insurance, serving until 2014, when he was succeeded by Dean Cameron.

== Death ==
Deal died on November 20, 2024 in Nampa, Idaho, at the age of 87.
