= Edson Deal =

American politician

Edson H. Deal

Secretary of State of Idaho
- In office January 2, 1967 – April 22, 1967
- Governor: Don Samuelson
- Preceded by: Louis E. Clapp
- Succeeded by: Pete Cenarrusa

29th Lieutenant Governor of Idaho
- In office January 1, 1951 – January 3, 1955
- Governor: Len Jordan
- Preceded by: Donald S. Whitehead
- Succeeded by: J. Berkeley Larsen

Personal details
- Born: November 11, 1903 Weiser, Idaho, U.S.
- Died: April 22, 1967 (aged 63) Boise, Idaho, U.S.
- Resting place: Kohlerlawn Cemetery; Nampa, Idaho, U.S.
- Party: Republican
- Spouse: Gwendolyn Shepard Deal
- Relatives: William Deal (grandson)
- Profession: Insurance agent

Edson Hart Deal (November 11, 1903 – April 22, 1967) was an American politician, Republican from Idaho. Deal was elected to the Idaho State Senate in 1940 and served for ten years, until his election as lieutenant governor in 1950. He served four years in that office, during the administration of Governor Len Jordan, and over a decade later was elected secretary of state in 1966.

Deal was in office less than four months when he suffered a fatal heart attack at age 63 while mowing his lawn in Boise. His successor was House speaker Pete Cenarrusa, appointed by Governor Don Samuelson. Cenarrusa continued as secretary of state for over 35 years, until 2003.

== Personal ==
Deal was in the insurance business in Nampa. He married Gwendolyn Shepard of Eugene, Oregon, in 1936, and they had three children.

Political offices
| Preceded by Donald S. Whitehead | Lieutenant Governor of Idaho; January 1, 1951–January 3, 1955 | Succeeded by J. Berkeley Larsen |
| Preceded by Louis E. Clapp | Secretary of State of Idaho; January 2, 1967–April 22, 1967 | Succeeded by Pete Cenarrusa |
