= Dean Cameron (politician) =

American politician from Idaho

Director the Idaho Department of Insurance
- Incumbent
- Assumed office July 2015
- Governor: Butch Otter; Brad Little
- Preceded by: Bill Deal

Director the Idaho Department of Health and Welfare
- Interim
- In office January 2024 – June 2024
- Governor: Brad Little
- Preceded by: Dave Jeppesen
- Succeeded by: Alex Adams

Member of the Idaho Senate
- In office August 27, 1991 – June 14, 2015
- Preceded by: Lynn Tominaga
- Succeeded by: Kelly Anthon
- Constituency: 24th district Seat B (1991–1992); 26th district (1992–2012); 27th district (2012–2015)

Personal details
- Born: January 20, 1961 (age 65) Burley, Idaho, U.S.
- Party: Republican
- Spouse: Linda Cameron
- Children: 3
- Education: Ricks College (AA)

Dean L. Cameron (born January 20, 1961) is an American politician serving as the director of the Idaho Department of Insurance. A Republican, Cameron served as a member of the Idaho Senate for 25 years.

== Early life and education ==
Cameron was born in Burley, Idaho. He graduated from Meridian High School earned an Associate of Arts degree in political science from Ricks College in 1984.

== Career ==
Cameron worked as an insurance salesman at Rupert Abstract Company and is currently its co-owner and employed at Cameron and Seamons.

He was a youth committeeman of the Republican Party from 1984 to 1988. He was a Republican precinct committeeman from 1988 to 1990.

=== Idaho Senate ===
In 1991, Senator Lynn Tominaga resigned to accept a position at the Idaho Water Users Association. The Legislative District 24 Central Committee met to fill the vacancy and sent three names to Governor Cecil Andrus. Andrus subsequently selected Cameron to fill the remainder of Tominaga's term.

After redistricting, in 1992 Cameron sought re-election. He was challenged by Representative Ralph Peters in the primary and Democrat Jason Stolldorf in the general election. In the 1994 Republican primary, Cameron was challenged by Harold Mohlmon. Cameron defeated Democratic challengers in 2002 and 2008, and defeated Mohlmon again in the 2010 Republican primary.

In 2012, Cameron filed for re-election and defeated rancher Doug Pickett in the 2012 Republican primary.

On January 14, 2015, Cameron resigned from the Idaho Senate and accepted his appointment as director of the Idaho Department of Insurance.

Cameron was the highest-ranking member of the Idaho Senate.

==== Committee assignments ====
Cameron previously served as a member of the following committees:

- Commerce and Human Resources (chair)
- Finance
- Health Care Task Force (co-chair)
- High Risk Pool Advisory
- Joint Finance and Appropriations (co-chair)
- Resources and Environment

=== Idaho Department of Insurance ===
Cameron serves as the director of the Idaho Department of Insurance and was appointed by Governor Butch Otter on June 15, 2015. He was reappointed to another four-year term by Governor Brad Little on January 4, 2019.

As an active member of National Association of Insurance Commissioners, Cameron serves as the treasurer and secretary.
