= Monarch Underwear Company fire =

1958 textile factory fire in Manhattan, New York

The Monarch Underwear Company fire occurred in Manhattan, New York City at 623 Broadway on March 19, 1958. Twenty-four people were killed in a loft fire, between Houston Street and Bleecker Street and fifteen more were injured. Six of the injured were hurt when they leaped from the building and missed fire nets. The conflagration began in the third floor textile printing plant of an edifice in which the workrooms of several businesses were located. Ten corpses were found underneath work benches of the Monarch Underwear Company, on the fourth floor. The fire started at 4:30 p.m. and lasted one and a half hours. It began in a processing oven of the S.T.S. Textile Company.

The building was located a few blocks from Washington Place, near Greene Street, the former locale of the Triangle Shirtwaist Company. The Triangle factory fire of March 25, 1911, killed one hundred forty-five persons.

On March 20, 1958 New York City Mayor Robert F. Wagner Jr. asked for legislation to prevent fires like the one at 623 Broadway. Wagner and New York City Fire Commissioner Edward F. Cavanaugh both stated that the structure did not violate fire and building codes. Wagner called on the New York City Council to enact necessary ordinances quickly. Among those he suggested were the installation of automatic fire sprinkling systems, the building of fireproof partitioning walls in lengthy rooms, the construction of full ceilings in loft buildings, and making it mandatory that each worker be given a fire drill.
