= J. Berkeley Larsen =

American politician

30th Lieutenant Governor of Idaho
- In office January 3, 1955 – January 5, 1959
- Governor: Robert E. Smylie
- Preceded by: Edson Deal
- Succeeded by: William Drevlow

Personal details
- Born: February 27, 1889 Mount Pleasant, Utah
- Died: March 30, 1979 (aged 90)
- Party: Republican

James Berkeley Larsen (February 27, 1889 – March 30, 1979) was a Republican politician from Idaho. He served as the 30th lieutenant governor of Idaho from 1955 to 1959 during the administration of Governor Robert E. Smylie.

Political offices
Preceded by Edson Deal	Lieutenant Governor of Idaho; January 3, 1955–January 5, 1959	Succeeded by William Drevlow
