= Karl Fields =

American political scientist

Karl J. Fields (born 1958) is a professor of Politics and Government at the University of Puget Sound.

Fields holds a BA from Brigham Young University in political science and an MA and Ph.D. from the University of California, Berkeley also in political science.

Fields specialty is East Asian politics especially in relation to economics. His first book Enterprise and the State in Korea and Taiwan (Cornell University Press, 1995) was about the inter-relations of government and business in East Asian economic growth. He also co-authored the textbook Cases in Comparative Politics along with Patrick O'Neil and Don Share (Norton, 2009).

Fields joined the faculty of the University of Puget Sound in 1990. For a time he served as director of the Asian Studies program at that institution. He is currently working on a book on party capitalism.

He was recognized as professor of the year in Washington State by the Carnegie Foundation for the Advancement of Teaching and the Council for Advancement and Support of Education. From 2000 to 2004, he was the director of the University of Puget Sound department of politics and government.

Fields served a mission for the Church of Jesus Christ of Latter-day Saints in Taiwan. He currently serves as a branch president in the Gig Harbor Washington Stake. In January 2021, it was announced that he had been called as Taiwan Taichung mission president. He will begin his service in July 2021.

Karl Fields is married to Melanie Fields and live together with their four children Lauren Fields, Lindsey Fields, Mason Fields, and Spencer Fields.
