= Todd Joseph Miles Holden =

American novelist

Todd Joseph Miles Holden (also known as T.J.M. Holden and Todd Holden) is an American-born social scientist, essayist, philosopher, and novelist. He was the first tenured foreign professor at Tohoku University, one of Asia’s elite universities, where he taught for 26 years. His scholarship has been multi- and trans-disciplinary, embracing globalization, media studies, cultural studies, semiotics, advertising, television, Japanese popular culture, sociology, cultural anthropology, political communication, gender, identity, and digital youth. Between 2000 and 2009 he was a contributor to the international webzine PopMatters, writing a regular column on Japanese popular culture called ReDotPop, and creating PM’s first blog, Peripatetic Postcards. In 2011 he published a book by the same name, bearing the subtitle "the journey of life through 25 of the world's cities". Recent work has included literary treatments of the 2011 Tōhoku earthquake and tsunami, dystopia, philosophical detection, comedy and caper.

== Academic background ==
Holden received his BA in Social Ecology from the University of California, Irvine, and his PhD in Interdisciplinary Social Science from the Maxwell School of Citizenship and Public Affairs at Syracuse University.

At UCI, he was strongly influenced by Ralph (Ray) Catalano and worked with Larry Agran, who went on to become Mayor of Irvine and, later, candidate for President of the United States. At Syracuse he was mentored by John A. Agnew, who oversaw his dissertation, along with Ralph Ketcham and Thomas E. Patterson. Other important influences were Barry Glassner, then-chair of the sociology department, and Robert Bogdan, whose approach to ethnography and qualitative content analysis have been apparent in Holden's scholarship.

== Administrative career ==
Upon obtaining his PhD, in 1988, Holden was recruited by Tohoku University, the third oldest of Japan's so-called “Imperial Universities", and one of Asia's top-ranked universities. His initial post was lecturer in the Department of English in the (now-defunct) College of General Education. Thereafter, he taught in the Department of Social Structure and Change in the Graduate School of Information Sciences and was an associate professor of society and culture at the (now-defunct) School of Language and Culture. In 2001 he was appointed professor of mediated sociology in the Graduate School of International Cultural Studies (GSICS), becoming the first foreigner to secure tenure at Tohoku University since its establishment in 1907. Twice Chair of the Department of Multi-Cultural Societies, he helped build a small, but dynamic graduate program on media, culture and society. He retired in 2014 after nearly 27 years of service.

In 2000 Holden served on the planning committee of Tohoku University's "International Symposium on Research and Education in the 21st Century," (ISRE 2000), an assembly that led to exchange agreements with 29 universities and 114 university departments from 31 nations. In 2005 he was part of the working group that designed the so-called Internet School (ISTU), the university's first step toward establishing a distance education program. In 2008 he was a visiting lecturer in geography at the University of California, Los Angeles, teaching a course on sports globalization; in 2013, he was a visiting scholar at Harvard University's Reischauer Institute of Japanese Studies, working on "Ukiyo-ad", a book on Japanese advertising, cultural communication and media theory.

During his career, Holden held executive positions in various international professional associations, including two terms (8 years) as chair of the Gender and Communication section of the International Association for Media and Communication Research (IAMCR), 4 years as vice-president of the Asia-Pacific Sociology Association (APSA), and 4 years as executive committee member of Anthropology of Japan in Japan (AJJ). He also served as webmaster and communications director for all three of these associations.

== Academic career ==
In the main, Holden's research has attended to the multiple, cross-cutting relationships between societal structures and processes, cultural values and practices, and media. Funded and published research has explored: cell phones, the Internet, television, advertising, novels, children's picture books, and film. The work has generally, but not exclusively, centered on Japan. Reflecting his familiarity with various communication platforms, his scholarship has appeared in the Sage Handbook of Media Studies (a global survey of advertising), The Encyclopedia of Television (a historical overview of Japanese TV), the first book ever on Japanese Cybercultures (a chapter on Internet dating), and Global Youth (a study of adolescent cell phone use in Japan). His Internet dating study, co-authored with Takako Tsuruki, has been extensively cited, as has his grounded theorization of media-reproduced "surveillance" in Japanese society.

Despite the core attention to media/tion, Holden's overriding concern has been the interaction between indigenous and exogenous values and practices – what is generally referred to as "globalization". This intellectual thread is directly traceable back to Agnew's "landmark" study of place, completed during Holden's final year at SU. For Holden, it is the mediation between people, media technologies and communication content in specific contexts that best accounts for political, cultural, and social phenomena, (and thereby reveals the contours and extent of globalization). This focus is most evident and best captured in the title of his 2006 book medi@sia: Global media/tion in and out of context (co-edited with Timothy J. Scrase). Even so, this geo-symbolic mediation can be discerned a decade earlier, in his comparative content analysis of 3,059 Japanese and American television ads, and his study of differential presentations of the body in national advertisements – a research topic that also bears some echoes of Glassner's body study, launched during the latter's time at SU.

The question of place also arises in Holden's widely circulated updating, to Japan, of Goffman's classic “gender advertisements”. This Japanese study, Medcalf noted, demonstrates that discrepancies in the hetero-normative narrative are “not a result of post-modern, globalizing transformations, but, rather, of long standing internal cultural and historical processes and contradictions.” Such complex relationships between gender, media and local distinctiveness were further explored in a much-sampled 2005 article on masculinities in Japanese cooking shows.

Holden has also employed other approaches to expose the distinctiveness of place-based ideas and practices. For instance, qualitative, semiotic-attuned content analysis demonstrated the integral role color plays in generating cultural meaning in American and Japanese advertising. The significance of such research, Patrick Hunout has observed, is that:

Holden points to numerous localized practices, which do not transcend national/cultural borders. Context-specific meanings serve to underscore the limits on globalization; they indicate the large degree to which cultures communicate in distinct, unique ways. Coloration becomes more than a semiological tool; it provides insight into societal ontology. It can be used to explain how cultures have been organized, how they “think” and even suggest, at times, why they act.

That said, not all of his studies of mediation in context have found clear-cut divergence. His ethnographic study of the advent of political consultants and spot-centered campaigns in the 1996 Japanese national elections were highly supportive of creeping convergence, as was his content analysis of what he has labeled “adentity”. In the latter case, messages of self-identification in Japan, while becoming more locally profuse and variegated, have also become exogenously homogeneous—insofar as their self-orientation appears more similar to ad messages from the West. Appraising the implications of Holden's grounded theorization, Kenji Kosaka observed that such adentifications reflect a departure from the past, where identity was often mediated by the group. To Kosaka, Holden's study was further evidence that Japanese society had evolved from its original collectivistic values to more individualistic values.

== Non-academic involvements ==
Between 1989 and 1994 Holden served as head coach of the men's basketball team at Tohoku University. A perennial Division 2 bottom-dweller, the team ascended to Division 1 in Holden's second season at the helm. It also won the prestigious Seven Universities' Competition the same year, Tohoku University's first basketball championship in 32 years. After becoming a fixture at youth basketball camps in the Tohoku region, Holden was offered the head coaching job with a professional women's basketball team sponsored by Yamagata Bank. In his first year, 1994–95, the team qualified for the play-in round for promotion to the First Division—the first time a team from Tohoku had earned this chance. His year coaching a women's professional team was briefly described in his PM feature on Tohoku and is the basis for the unpublished manuscript, Red Dot, Orange Rock, Blues.

== Literary career ==
After writing a column about Japanese popular culture for nearly a decade for the ezine PopMatters and penning over 600 entries in an online travelblog, Holden published the memoir, Peripatetic Postcards: The journey of life, through 25 of the world's cities, in 2010. Holden characterizes the work as a literary memoir of being and becoming; a set of lessons about life and musings on the human condition by a writer searching to find his way. The book opens by outlining a philosophy for undertaking the journey of life—what Holden calls “peripatacity”—and then enumerates a set of rules for conducting the journey. Subsequent chapters focus on the processes, people, places, predicaments, and philosophies encountered along life's road. A final chapter personifies the journey by following the progress of the author, his wife and bi-cultural children on road trips through their native America and Japan—trips that prompt reflections on childhood, death, love, fate, God, happiness, family, home, place, personal growth, and the meaning of life. Throughout, Peripatetic Postcards operates at two levels: seeking to convey the panoply of human experience for those looking to broaden their understanding of the human condition in an increasingly globalized world, while also providing a model for discovery, personified in the author's experience.

In 2013 Holden published a novel, Mr. Big Maus, a caper centering on contemporary corporate culture run amok and one iconoclast's mission to rebalance an unjust world. Mr. Big Maus is a blend of late-modern, contemporary, and post-modern sensibilities, with a plot that is linear and integrated, which eschews mysticism, and provides action that is sudden, direct and rational. This is countered by a narrative that is ironic, characters who are self-reflexive yet irrational, and spiced with the nuance of metafiction. Its protagonist is flawed, disempowered, contending with alienation, and questing to discover identity. The plot presents universal themes within the context of everyday life and features evolution in its character's lives. It offers the audience a moral resolution. Substantively, the book spotlights history and memory, celebrates intellect and speech, and is optimistic and ultimately uplifting. Among its key themes is discourse about: time, consciousness and human practices. This is seen, above all, through the constant presence, use, and dependence on technology (i.e. the emerging present and looming future), in contrast to the protagonist's constant nostalgia for a reliance on products of cinema, music, television and literature (i.e. the recent and distant past). A second theme is the changing America landscape—reflected in its ubiquitous immigrants—as well as the clash of generational and institutional values. A final theme, built from strands of the previous two, is the ways that innovation, invention, commercialization and business influence and are influenced by the poles of technological determinism and independent creative expression.

Holden's current projects include two novels about the events surrounding Japan's triple disaster of March 11, 2011: Tsunami and Escape from Sonoyo. The former, covers the disaster in sixteen self-contained, interconnected stories; the latter centers on the ordeals of one family divided, in search of themselves and one another. Combined, the books present a portrait of loss, heroism, survival, and perseverance through the eyes of victims, witnesses, rescuers, refugees, reporters, civil authorities, soldiers and criminals. The result can be read as more than a record of one period in a particular nation's history, but a universal story of sacrifice, heartbreak, faith, redemption and transcendence during crisis.

Other projects in various stages of development include: Red Dot, Orange Rock, Blues, an autobiographical meditation on being and becoming, based on Holden's six years coaching men's collegiate and women's professional basketball in Japan; The Seekers of Wisdom, a novel blending the prodigal return, philosophical detection, high school sports, the literary canon, hard-boiled mystery and police procedural; and Orphan 7Y-05-O, a dystopian tale centering on a training school for terrorists and, possibly, capitalist democracy's inescapable future.

== Personal ==
Holden was born in Pasadena, California in 1958. He is the son of Joseph T. Holden, PhD, a biochemist, Emeritus Senior Scientist, and director emeritus of the Beckman Research Institute at the City of Hope National Medical Center. His mother, Nancy Holden, attended the original Little Red School House in New York City, and later earned an MS. A career educator, she founded a program for special needs children in Los Angeles and has been active as board member and president of various Jewish genealogy societies. Holden attended The Chandler School and was one of only four students to graduate from its short-lived high school. During that time he played on the same football team as Drew Pinsky (also known as “Dr. Drew”). Holden's wife, Takako, and his children, Maya and Alex, play prominent roles in the concluding chapter of Peripatetic Postcards. Mr. Big Maus is dedicated to Maya and Alex, as well as Holden's father.

== Selected publications ==
- Holden, T.J.M. “Deai kei: Japan's new culture of encounter,” (with Takako Tsuruki), in D. Bell and B. Kennedy (eds), The Cybercultures Reader, 2nd Edition (2007). Originally published in N. Gottlieb and M. McLelland (eds.), Japanese Cybercultures. London: Routledge. (2003), pp. 34–49.
- Holden, T.J.M. medi@sia: Global media/tion in and out of context, co-edited with Timothy J. Scrase, London: Routledge. 2006.
- Holden, T.J.M. “Sportsports: Cultural exports and imports in Japan's contemporary globalization career,” in M. Allen and R. Sakamoto (eds.), Inside-Out Japan: Popular Culture and Globalization. Abingdon, Oxon: Routledge (2006), pp. 117–136.
- Holden, T.J.M. "The Overcooked and Underdone: Masculinities in Japanese Food Programming," in C. Counihan and P. Van Esterik (eds.), Food and Culture: A Reader, (2nd Ed.), (2007):202-220. Originally published in Food and Foodways, "Men, Food and Asian Identities", Volume 13, Number 1-2 (March 2005), pp. 39–65.
- Holden, T.J.M. “Japanese Television,” in H. Newcomb, ed., The Encyclopedia of Television(2nd Edition), New York: Routledge (2005), pp. 1210–1214.
- Holden, T.J.M. “Advertising: A synthetic approach,” in J.D.H. Downing, D. McQuail, P. Schlesinger and E. Wartella, eds., Handbook of Media Studies. Newbury Park and London: Sage (2004), pp. 447–476.
- Holden, T.J.M. Globalization, Culture and Inequality in Asia, co-edited with Timothy J. Scrase and Scott Baum. Melbourne: Trans Pacific Press. 2003.
- Holden, T.J.M. “Adentity: Images of self in Japanese television advertising," The International Scope Review, Volume 2, Issue 4 (Winter 2000).
- Holden, T.J.M. “I'm Your Venus"/"You're a Rake": Gender and the grand narrative in Japanese television advertising,” Intersections: Gender, History and Culture in the Asian Context, Issue 3 (February 2000).
