= William Drevlow =

American politician

W. E. Drevlow

31st Lieutenant Governor of Idaho
- In office January 5, 1959 – January 2, 1967
- Governor: Robert E. Smylie
- Preceded by: J. Berkeley Larsen
- Succeeded by: Jack M. Murphy

Personal details
- Born: January 23, 1890 Round Prairie, Minnesota
- Died: August 20, 1975 (aged 85) Lewiston, Idaho
- Party: Democratic

William Edward Drevlow (January 23, 1890 – August 20, 1975) was a Democratic politician from Idaho. He was a native of Minnesota. He served as the 31st lieutenant governor of Idaho from 1959 to 1967 during the administration of Governor Robert E. Smylie.

He died of pneumonia and internal bleeding in 1975.

Political offices
Preceded by J. Berkeley Larsen	Lieutenant Governor of Idaho; January 5, 1959–January 2, 1967	Succeeded by Jack M. Murphy
