= 1986 Idaho gubernatorial election =

- November 4, 1986
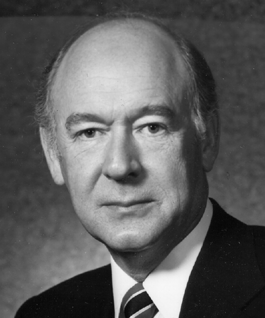

Nominee	Cecil Andrus	David Leroy
Party	Democratic	Republican
Popular vote	193,429	189,794
Percentage	49.93%	48.99%
- County results Andrus: 50–60% 60–70% 70–80% Leroy: 50–60% 60–70%
Governor before election
John V. Evans
Democratic
Elected Governor
Cecil Andrus
Democratic

The 1986 Idaho gubernatorial election was held on November 4, 1986 to elect the governor of the state of Idaho. Cecil Andrus, a former Democratic governor, was elected defeating the Republican Lieutenant Governor David Leroy.

This was an open seat election; longtime incumbent John V. Evans ran for the U.S. Senate, but lost. This was the first open-seat gubernatorial election in Idaho since 1954.

== Nominations ==
Republican Lieutenant Governor David Leroy announced his candidacy for governor fourteen months before the election in the autumn of 1985. Raised in Lewiston, Leroy was a former county prosecutor in Boise and state attorney general.

Democrat former governor Cecil Andrus declared his bid for governor six months later in March 1986. He held the office for six years (1971–1977), until his appointment as U.S. Secretary of the Interior (1977–1981) in the Carter Administration. Incumbent Evans, successor to Andrus in 1977, chose to run for the U.S. Senate, but lost to incumbent Steve Symms.

Both Andrus and Leroy were unopposed for their respective nominations in the statewide primary on May 27.

== Campaign ==
As election day neared, polls showed Democrat Andrus ahead of Leroy.

== Election results ==
It was the third of four wins for Andrus, and the fifth of six consecutive for the Democrats. Similar to the previous election in 1982 (with different candidates), the winning margin was narrow.

Idaho gubernatorial election, 1986
Party	Candidate	Votes	%	±%
Democratic	Cecil Andrus	193,429	49.93	−0.71
Republican	David Leroy	189,794	48.99	−0.37
Independent	James Miller	4,203	1.08	+1.08
Majority		3,635	0.9	−4.9
Turnout		387,426		
Democratic hold		Swing		

Preceded by 1982	Idaho gubernatorial elections	Succeeded by 1990
