= William J. Murphy (Idaho politician) =

American politician

34th Lieutenant Governor of Idaho
- In office January 28, 1977 – January 1, 1979
- Governor: John Evans
- Preceded by: John Evans
- Succeeded by: Phil Batt

Personal details
- Born: March 12, 1912 Wallace, Idaho, U.S.
- Died: August 20, 1993 (aged 81) Coeur d'Alene, Idaho, U.S.
- Party: Democratic
- Spouse(s): Margaret Mary Murphy (1915–1982)
- Children: 4
- Education: Gonzaga University
- Profession: Accountant

William J. Murphy (March 12, 1912 – August 20, 1993) was a Democratic politician from Idaho. He served as the state's 34th lieutenant governor from 1977 to 1979, during the administration of Governor John V. Evans.

Born in Wallace, Murphy was an alumnus of Gonzaga University in Spokane and was an accountant in Wallace with ASARCO. First elected in 1958, he was a seven-term state legislator from Shoshone County, with a stint as house minority leader.

Murphy served in the legislature through 1972, then was an assistant to Governor Cecil Andrus, who was elected in 1970 and 1974. Andrus left for Washington, D.C. in January 1977 to become the Secretary of the Interior under President Jimmy Carter. Evans succeeded Andrus as governor which left a vacancy in the office of lieutenant governor.

Murphy was one of nine nominees, and was selected by Evans in mid-January. He was defeated for election to a full term in November 1978 by Republican Phil Batt of Wilder and left office 47 years ago. As of 2022, Murphy is the last Democrat to hold the position, and Evans is the last elected (1974). After leaving office, he served on a state advisory panel on economic development and community affairs, appointed by Evans in 1980.

Murphy and his wife Margaret (1915–1982) had four daughters. He died of cancer in 1993 at age 81 in Coeur d'Alene where he lived, and he and his wife are buried at Holy Cross Cemetery in Spokane.

Political offices
Preceded by John V. Evans	Lieutenant Governor of Idaho; January 28, 1977–January 1, 1979	Succeeded by Phil Batt
