= 1994 Idaho gubernatorial election =

- November 8, 1994
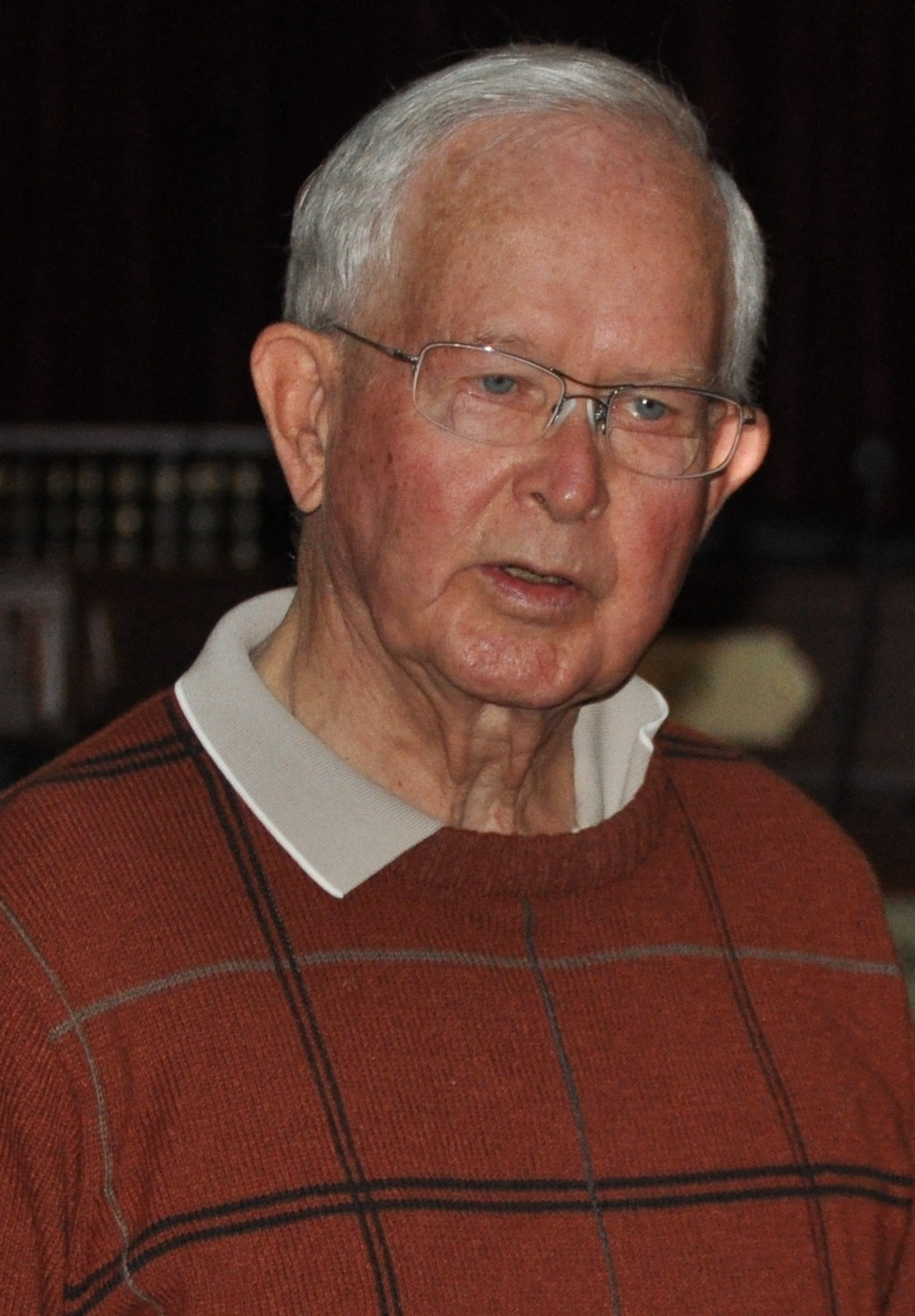

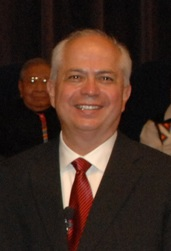
Nominee	Phil Batt	Larry Echo Hawk
Party	Republican	Democratic
Popular vote	216,123	181,363
Percentage	52.29%	43.88%
- County results Batt: 40–50% 50–60% 60–70% 70–80% Echo Hawk: 50–60% 60–70%
Governor before election
Cecil Andrus
Democratic
Elected Governor
Phil Batt
Republican

The 1994 Idaho gubernatorial election was held on November 8 to select the governor of the U.S. state of Idaho. Democratic incumbent Cecil Andrus chose not to seek reelection after a total of fourteen years in office. Former state senator and Republican Party chair Phil Batt rallied to defeat Democratic attorney general Larry Echo Hawk; the victory was the first by a Republican in 28 years.

== Republican primary ==
Lieutenant governor Butch Otter was considered a likely candidate for governor, but decided to run for re-election in 1994 after being arrested for driving under the influence in August 1992. Otter went on to be elected governor in 2006, though he publicly admitted that the incident could have ended his political career. Batt was the Republican nominee twelve years earlier, but narrowly lost to incumbent John Evans.

=== Candidates ===
- Phil Batt, former lieutenant governor
- Larry Eastland
- Chuck Winder, naval aviator
- Doug Dorn

=== Results ===
Results by county Batt: 30–40%; 40–50%; 50–60%; 60–70%; Eastland: 40–50%; 50–60%

Republican primary results
Party	Candidate	Votes	%
Republican	Phil Batt	57,066	48.00
Republican	Larry Eastland	38,664	32.52
Republican	Chuck Winder	16,063	13.51
Republican	Doug Dorn	7,098	5.97
Total votes		118,891	100.00

== Democratic primary ==
The statewide primary was held on May 24, 1994.

=== Candidates ===
- Larry Echo Hawk, Attorney General of Idaho
- Ron Beitelspacher, Idaho State Senator
- David W. Sheperd

=== Results ===
Results by county Echo Hawk: 50–60%; 60–70%; 70–80%; 80–90%; 90–100%; Beitelspacher: 50–60%; 60–70%; 70–80%

Democratic Primary results
Party	Candidate	Votes	%
Democratic	Larry Echo Hawk	42,661	73.81
Democratic	Ron Beitelspacher	12,377	21.41
Democratic	David W. Sheperd	2,759	4.77
Total votes		57,797	100.00

== General election ==
=== Campaign ===
Although at first many thought Echo Hawk would win the election and become the first Native American governor in the United States, Batt prevailed with an aggressive campaign and with the help of a Republican tide that was especially powerful in Idaho in 1994, snapping a streak of 24 years of Democratic victories.

=== Results ===
Idaho gubernatorial election, 1994
Party	Candidate	Votes	%	±%
Republican	Phil Batt	216,123	52.29	+20.49
Democratic	Larry Echo Hawk	181,363	43.88	−24.33
Independent	Ronald D. Rankin	15,793	3.82	
Write-ins		67	0.02	
Majority		34,760	8.41	−28.00
Turnout		419,330		
Republican gain from Democratic		Swing		

== See also ==
- Governor of Idaho
- List of governors of Idaho
- Idaho gubernatorial elections

Preceded by 1990	Idaho gubernatorial elections	Succeeded by 1998
