= Jack M. Murphy =

American lawyer and politician from Idaho

32nd Lieutenant Governor of Idaho
- In office January 2, 1967 – January 6, 1975
- Governor: Don Samuelson; Cecil Andrus
- Preceded by: William Drevlow
- Succeeded by: John Evans

Member of the Idaho Senate
- In office 1952–1966

Personal details
- Born: September 6, 1925 Shoshone, Idaho, U.S.
- Died: May 3, 1984 (aged 58) Shoshone, Idaho, U.S.
- Resting place: Shoshone Cemetery
- Children: 4
- Education: University of Utah

Military service
- Allegiance: United States
- Branch/service: U.S. Army
- Rank: Sergeant
- Battles/wars: World War II

Jack Medd Murphy (September 6, 1925 – May 3, 1984) was an American lawyer and politician who served as the 32nd lieutenant governor of Idaho from 1967 to 1975.

== Early life and education ==
Murphy was born in Shoshone, Idaho. He attended the University of Utah.

== Career ==
Murphy served in the United States Army during World War II as a sergeant.

In the 1950s, Murphy became a lawyer in Lincoln County, Idaho. In 1952, Murphy's political career began when he was elected to the Idaho Senate. He served until 1966.

On November 8, 1966, Murphy won the election and became a Republican lieutenant governor of Idaho. Murphy defeated William Drevlow with 52.21% of the votes. In 1967, Murphy served during the administration of Republican Governor Don Samuelson.

On November 3, 1970, as an incumbent, Murphy won the election and continued serving as the lieutenant governor of Idaho. Murphy defeated Paul S. Boyd and Wallace Hitt with 56.73% of the votes. Governor Samuelson was defeated by Democrat Cecil Andrus.

Murphy was the Republican nominee for governor in 1974, but was soundly defeated by Andrus. Murphy also served as a member of the board of regents of the Idaho State Department of Education.

== Personal life ==
Murphy and his family lived in Shoshone, Idaho. Murphy has four children. On May 3, 1984, Murphy died from heart failure in Shoshone, Idaho. Murphy is interred at Shoshone Cemetery.

Political offices
Preceded by William Drevlow	Lieutenant Governor of Idaho; January 2, 1967–January 6, 1975	Succeeded by John V. Evans
Party political offices
Preceded by Don Samuelson	Republican Party nominee, Governor of Idaho; 1974 (lost)	Succeeded by Allan Larsen
