= Wilder High School =

Coordinates: 43°40′44″N 116°54′10″W

Location
- 419 Huff Road; Wilder, Idaho 83676; United States

Information
- Type: Public
- Principal: John Carlisle
- Teaching staff: 10.07 (FTE)
- Grades: 9-12
- Enrollment: 143 (2023-2024)
- Student to teacher ratio: 14.20
- Colors: Purple, gold and white
- Mascot: Wildcats
- IHSAA Division: 1A D1
- Website: https://wilderschools.org/

Wilder High School is a high school in Wilder, Idaho, United States. Located off Huff Road, the school had a total enrollment of 185 in the 2010–2011 school year, almost 80% of whom were Hispanic. There are currently 199 students enrolled in the school.

== Notable alumni ==
- Phil Batt, governor of Idaho
- Mark Lindsay
