= Don Samuelson =

American politician

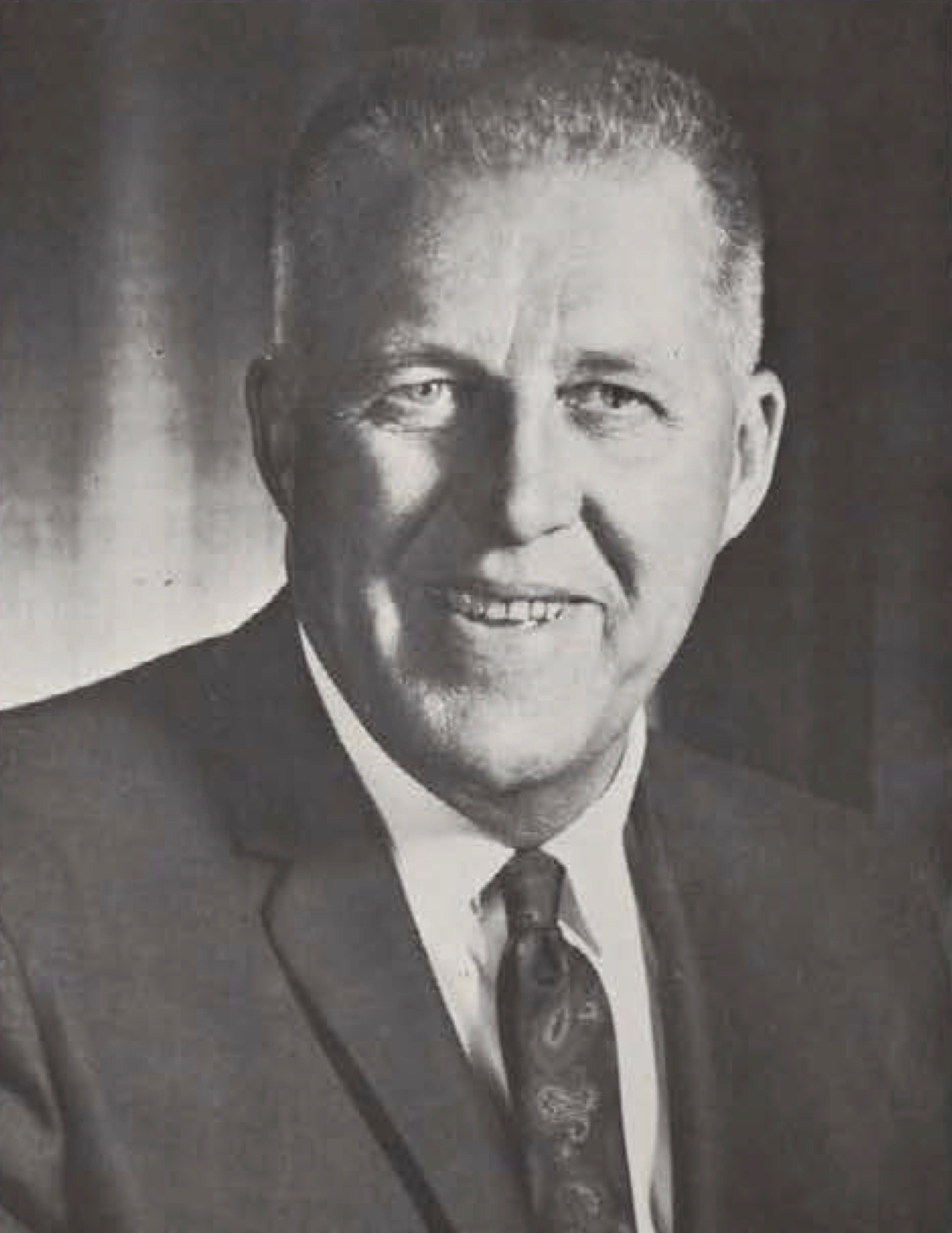
- From 1967's Gem of the Mountains, the yearbook of the University of Idaho

25th Governor of Idaho
- In office January 2, 1967 – January 4, 1971
- Lieutenant: Jack Murphy
- Preceded by: Robert Smylie
- Succeeded by: Cecil Andrus

Member of the Idaho Senate
- In office 1960–1966

Personal details
- Born: Donald William Samuelson; July 27, 1913 Woodhull, Illinois, U.S.
- Died: January 20, 2000 (aged 86) Seattle, Washington, U.S.
- Resting place: Pinecrest Memorial Park, Sandpoint, Idaho, U.S.
- Party: Republican
- Spouse: Ruby A. Samuelson (m. 1936)
- Children: 2
- Education: Knox College (attended)

Military service
- Allegiance: United States
- Branch/service: U.S. Navy
- Years of service: 1944–1946
- Unit: Farragut Naval Training Station
- Battles/wars: World War II

Donald William Samuelson (July 27, 1913 – January 20, 2000) was an American Republican politician who served as the 25th governor of Idaho, from 1967 to 1971. He is the state's most recent incumbent governor to lose a re-election bid (1970).

== Early life and education ==
Born in Woodhull, Illinois, Samuelson grew up on a farm, and attended Knox College.

== Career ==
Samuelson served in the United States Navy during World War II as a weapons instructor and gunsmith at the Farragut Naval Training Station, a major inland training facility at Lake Pend Oreille in northern Idaho.

After the war, Samuelson stayed in the area; he brought his family out from Illinois and opened a sporting goods store in nearby Sandpoint. He also had an interest in a business that sold and leased mining and logging equipment.

=== Governor of Idaho ===
A conservative, Samuelson was encouraged by Governor Robert Smylie to run for the state senate in 1960; Samuelson won and was re-elected in 1962 and 1964. After the Democratic landslide of 1964, he decided to run for governor in 1966, which was still held by three-term incumbent Smylie, a moderate Republican from Boise and former state attorney general. In a heated race that drew national attention to the Republican gubernatorial primary, Samuelson won handily, 61 to 39%.

Following their wins in the early August primary, Samuelson and attorney Charles Herndon of Salmon were slated to face each other in the November general election. In mid-September, while flying from Pocatello to Coeur d'Alene, Herndon and two others were killed in a private plane crash in the central Idaho mountains, northwest of Stanley. The pilot of the twin-engine Piper PA-23 was the only survivor. Occurring only seven weeks before the election, the Democrats nominated the runner-up in the primary, state senator Cecil Andrus of Orofino, whom Samuelson defeated by over 10,000 votes.

During the 1970 gubernatorial campaign, Samuelson supported molybdenum mining in central Idaho's White Cloud Mountains, and was defeated for re-election by Andrus, a staunch opponent of the mining development, and returned to private life.

Following Samuelson's win in 1966, Democrats won the next six gubernatorial elections in Idaho, through 1990.

== Personal life ==
He and his wife, Ruby A. Samuelson, were married in 1936 and had two children.

Samuelson died at age 86 of a heart attack on January 20, 2000, at the Swedish Medical Center in Seattle. He is interred at Pinecrest Memorial Park in Sandpoint, Idaho.

Party political offices
Preceded by Robert E. Smylie	Republican Party nominee, Governor of Idaho; 1966 (won), 1970 (lost)	Succeeded by Jack M. Murphy
Political offices
Preceded by Robert E. Smylie	Governor of Idaho; January 2, 1967 – January 4, 1971	Succeeded by Cecil Andrus
