= John W. Batt Jr. =

American politician (1921–2009)

Member of the Idaho House of Representatives
- In office 1963–1964

Personal details
- Born: September 27, 1921
- Died: September 5, 2009 (aged 87)
- Relatives: Phil Batt (brother)

John W. Batt Jr. (September 27, 1921 – September 5, 2009), also known as John Batt, was an American politician. He served as a member of the Idaho House of Representatives.

== Life and career ==
Batt served in the Army Air Corps during World War II.

Batt served in the Idaho House of Representatives from 1963 to 1964.

Batt died on September 5, 2009, at the age of 87.
