= 1982 Idaho gubernatorial election =

- November 2, 1982
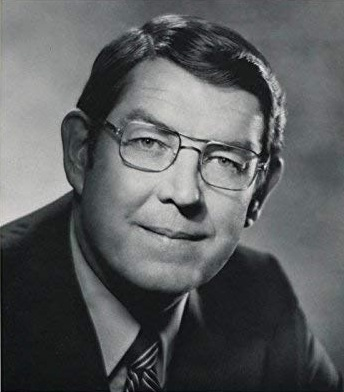

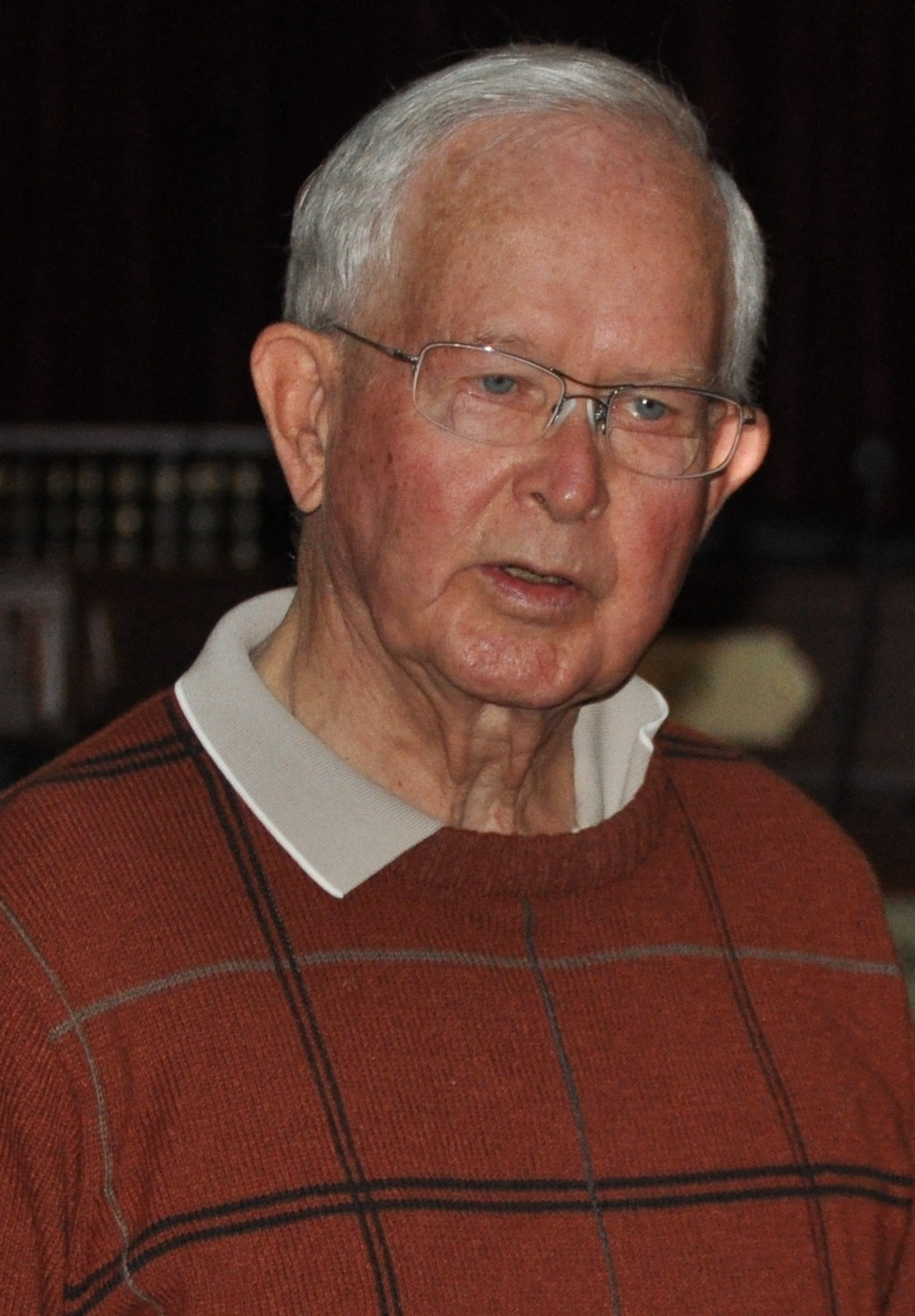
Nominee	John V. Evans	Phil Batt
Party	Democratic	Republican
Popular vote	165,365	161,157
Percentage	50.64%	49.36%
- County results Evans: 50–60% 60–70% 70–80% Batt: 50–60% 60–70% 70–80%
Governor before election
John V. Evans
Democratic
Elected Governor
John V. Evans
Democratic

The 1982 Idaho gubernatorial election was held on November 2. Incumbent Democrat John V. Evans narrowly defeated Republican nominee Phil Batt with 50.64% of the vote, the fourth of six consecutive wins for the Democratic party.

Evans served nearly ten years as governor, then ran for the U.S. Senate in 1986. Batt ran again for governor twelve years later in 1994 and won.

== Primary elections ==
Primary elections were held on May 25, 1982.

=== Republican primary ===
==== Candidates ====
- Phil Batt, incumbent Lieutenant Governor
- Ralph Olmstead, Speaker of the Idaho House of Representatives

==== Results ====
Republican primary results
Party	Candidate	Votes	%
Republican	Phil Batt	63,622	63.91
Republican	Ralph Olmstead	35,932	36.09
Total votes		99,554	100.00

== General election ==
=== Candidates ===
- John V. Evans, Democratic
- Phil Batt, Republican

=== Results ===
1982 Idaho gubernatorial election
Party	Candidate	Votes	%	±%
Democratic	John V. Evans (incumbent)	165,365	50.64%	
Republican	Phil Batt	161,157	49.36%	
Majority		4,208		
Turnout		326,522		
Democratic hold		Swing		
