= Ron Beitelspacher =

American politician

Ron Beitelspacher (born January 25, 1945, in Hoven, South Dakota) is a former Democratic Idaho state senator. He finished second behind Larry EchoHawk in the 1994 Democratic primary for Governor of Idaho.

A resident of Grangeville and a lineman by trade, Beitelspacher represented North Central Idaho in the Idaho Legislature in the 1980s and early 1990s. He served briefly in the Idaho House of Representatives in 1979 after being appointed to fill a vacancy by Gov. John V. Evans. He was appointed to the Idaho Senate in 1980, again by Evans to fill a vacancy.

Beitelspacher was elected to the Idaho Senate in 1980 from a North Central Idaho based floterial district and reelected throughout the 1980s. Towards the end of his Idaho Senate career Beitelspacher served as the ranking member of the resources and environment committee. He chose not to run for reelection in 1992 after floterial districts were eliminated.

Along with several other Democrats, in 1993 Beitelspacher announced his candidacy for Governor of Idaho after it became clear the Democratic incumbent, Cecil D. Andrus, would not run for a fifth term. Although most of the potential Democratic field dropped out after EchoHawk, the then-attorney general, announced his candidacy in early 1994, Beitelspacher remained in the race. Beitelspacher won a handful of counties in his North Central Idaho base in the May 1994 primary, but was decisively defeated statewide by EchoHawk.

In September 2011 Beitelspacher was chosen to co-chair a bipartisan committee to oversee redistricting in Idaho. The committee was convened after a previous committee failed to produce a redistricting plan.
