= Cecil Andrus =

American politician (1931–2017)

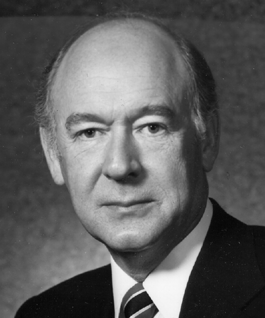

26th and 28th Governor of Idaho
- In office January 5, 1987 – January 2, 1995
- Lieutenant: Butch Otter
- Preceded by: John V. Evans
- Succeeded by: Phil Batt
- In office January 4, 1971 – January 23, 1977
- Lieutenant: Jack M. Murphy; John V. Evans
- Preceded by: Don Samuelson
- Succeeded by: John V. Evans

42nd United States Secretary of the Interior
- In office January 23, 1977 – January 20, 1981
- President: Jimmy Carter
- Preceded by: Thomas S. Kleppe
- Succeeded by: James G. Watt

Chair of the National Governors Association
- In office July 4, 1976 – January 23, 1977
- Preceded by: Robert D. Ray
- Succeeded by: Reubin Askew

Personal details
- Born: Cecil Dale Andrus; August 25, 1931 Hood River, Oregon, U.S.
- Died: August 24, 2017 (aged 85) Boise, Idaho, U.S.
- Party: Democratic
- Spouse: Carol May (m. 1949)
- Children: 3
- Education: Oregon State University
- Website: Official website

Military service
- Allegiance: United States
- Branch/service: United States Navy
- Years of service: 1951–1955
- Rank: Petty officer (second class)
- Unit: United States Navy Reserve
- Battles/wars: Korean War; Cold War

Cecil Dale Andrus (August 25, 1931 – August 24, 2017) was an American politician who served as 26th and 28th governor of Idaho, for a total of fourteen years. A Democrat, he also served as U.S. Secretary of the Interior from 1977 to 1981 during the Carter Administration. Andrus lost his first gubernatorial election in 1966 but won four (in 1970, 1974, 1986, and 1990) becoming the second Governor of Idaho to serve non-consecutive terms (the first was Republican C. A. Bottolfsen), and his fourteen years as governor is the most in state history.

In public life, Andrus was noted for his strong conservationist and environmental views and accomplishments, and an Idaho wildlife preserve established in 1993 in Washington County is named the Cecil D. Andrus Wildlife Management Area in his honor. In 2018, the Cecil D. Andrus–White Clouds Wilderness was renamed after him. A political liberal, he protected the environment by minimizing the control of business interests held over the public domain and by concentrating decision-making in the hands of experts in the Interior Department. He argued that environmentalism can and must coexist with positive economic development.

== Early life ==
Born in Hood River, Oregon on August 25, 1931, Andrus was the middle of three children of Hal Stephen and Dorothy May (Johnson) Andrus, with older brother Steve and younger sister Margaret. They later lived near Junction City, on a farm without electricity. During World War II, the family moved to Eugene in early 1942, when "Cece" was 11, where Hal (1906–2004) and his brother Bud opened a machine shop to refurbish sawmill equipment. Andrus graduated from Eugene High School in 1948 at age 16 and attended Oregon State College in Corvallis, where he majored in engineering in his freshman year.

At age 17, he got a good summer job with the local utility in 1949, and late in August, he eloped to Reno with Carol Mae May (born December 26, 1932), his high school sweetheart. Andrus had just turned 18, and she was 16 months younger. The Andruses enjoyed a happy, affectionate marriage, and he always referred to her as "his first wife" or "his bride". He decided to keep working and not return to college. Following the outbreak of the Korean War, he enlisted in the U.S. Naval Reserves in February 1951, and served as an electronics technician aboard patrol aircraft until 1955.

After his discharge from the Navy, Andrus moved to Orofino in northern Idaho, where he worked in the timber industry in a variety of jobs at a sawmill his father co-owned. After the sawmill closed, Andrus switched to the insurance industry in 1963, and moved his family down the Clearwater River to Lewiston in 1966.

== Political career ==
=== State Senate ===
In 1960, at age 28, and concerned over the local Republican state senator's stance against needed education improvements in Idaho schools, particularly in rural areas of the state, Andrus filed as a Democrat to run against him and won, and was re-elected in 1962 and 1964 from Orofino (and Clearwater County).

=== Gubernatorial candidate ===
Andrus first ran for governor in 1966 but was narrowly defeated in the Democratic primary by Charles Herndon, an attorney from Salmon.

Seven weeks before the November election, Herndon and two others died in a twin-engine private plane crash in the mountains six miles (10 km) northwest of Stanley, while en route from Twin Falls to Coeur d'Alene in mid-September. Andrus was appointed the nominee to take Herndon's place on the ballot. He lost the general election to Republican Don Samuelson of Sandpoint by more than 11,000 votes, earning Andrus the unlikely distinction of losing both the primary and general election races for the same office in the same year. He returned to the state senate two years later, easily unseating the Republican incumbent in the 1968 election, and represented Lewiston. Herndon's widow, Lucille, was elected to several local political offices after his death.

=== Governor of Idaho (1971–1977) ===
Undaunted by his earlier setback, Andrus defeated Samuelson by over 10,000 votes in a gubernatorial election rematch in 1970. This was attributed in large part to Andrus's public opposition to proposals for development of molybdenum mining in central Idaho's White Cloud Mountains, which Samuelson supported.

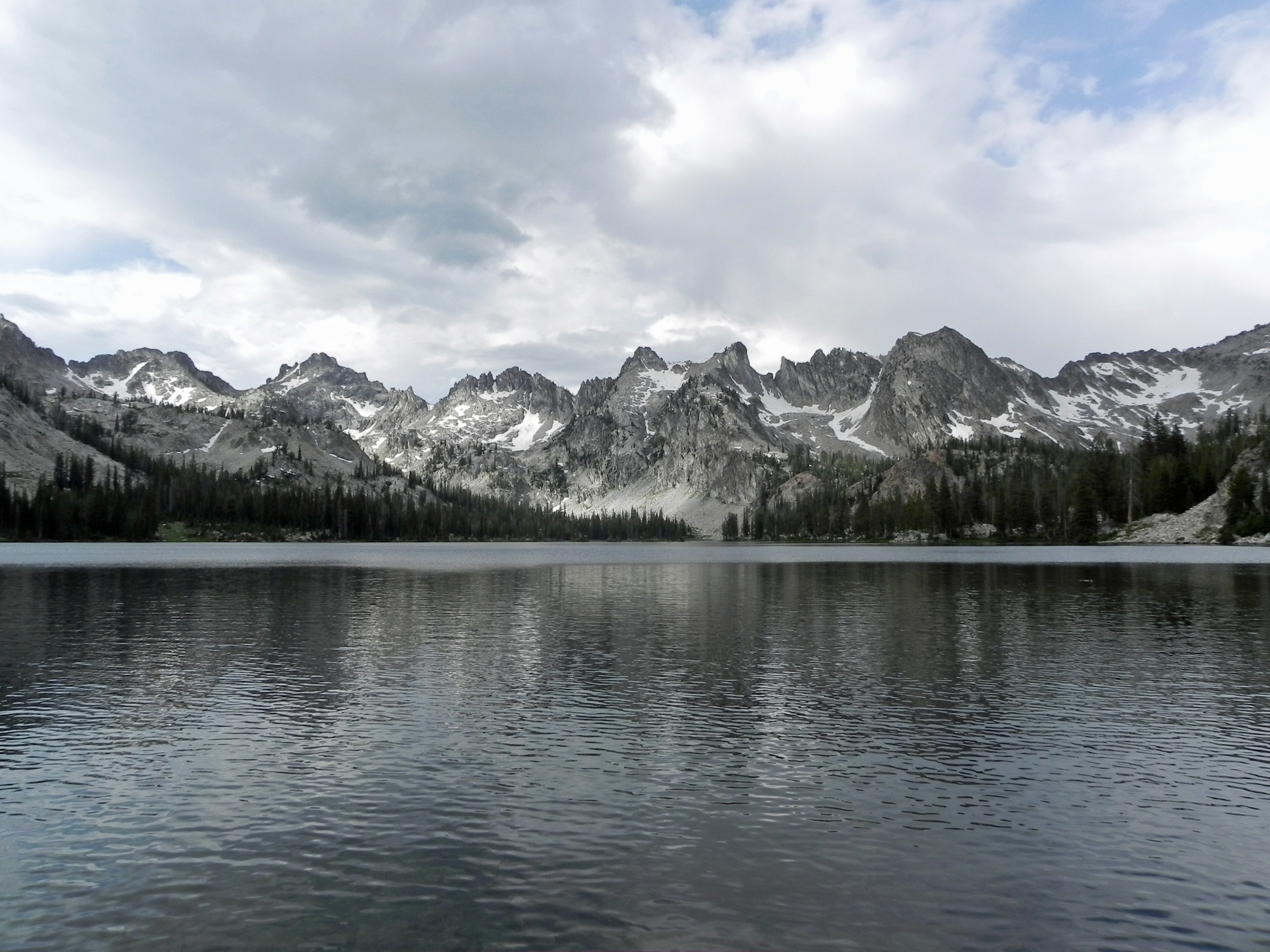
Alice Lake in Idaho's Sawtooth Wilderness

During his first term as governor, Andrus played a key role in winning support by the U.S. Congress for federal designation of the Sawtooth Wilderness Area in the State of Idaho. Andrus was easily re-elected in 1974 with over 70% of the vote, defeating Republican Lieutenant Governor Jack M. Murphy of Shoshone by a record margin.

In 1974, Time magazine named Governor Andrus one of the "200 Faces for the Future".

=== Secretary of the Interior (1977–1981) ===
In January 1977, Andrus left his post as governor to serve as Secretary of the Interior for newly inaugurated President Jimmy Carter, whom he had known since both were freshman governors in 1971. Andrus became the first Idahoan to serve in a presidential cabinet. He was succeeded in Idaho by Lieutenant Governor John V. Evans, a Democrat who served nearly a decade, winning elections in 1978 and 1982.

Andrus also took a leadership role in securing Congressional passage of the Redwood National Park Expansion Act in 1978. which added 48,000 acres (75 sq mi; 190 km^{2}) to Redwood National Park in California, in a major expansion to preserve remnants of the giant redwood forests there.

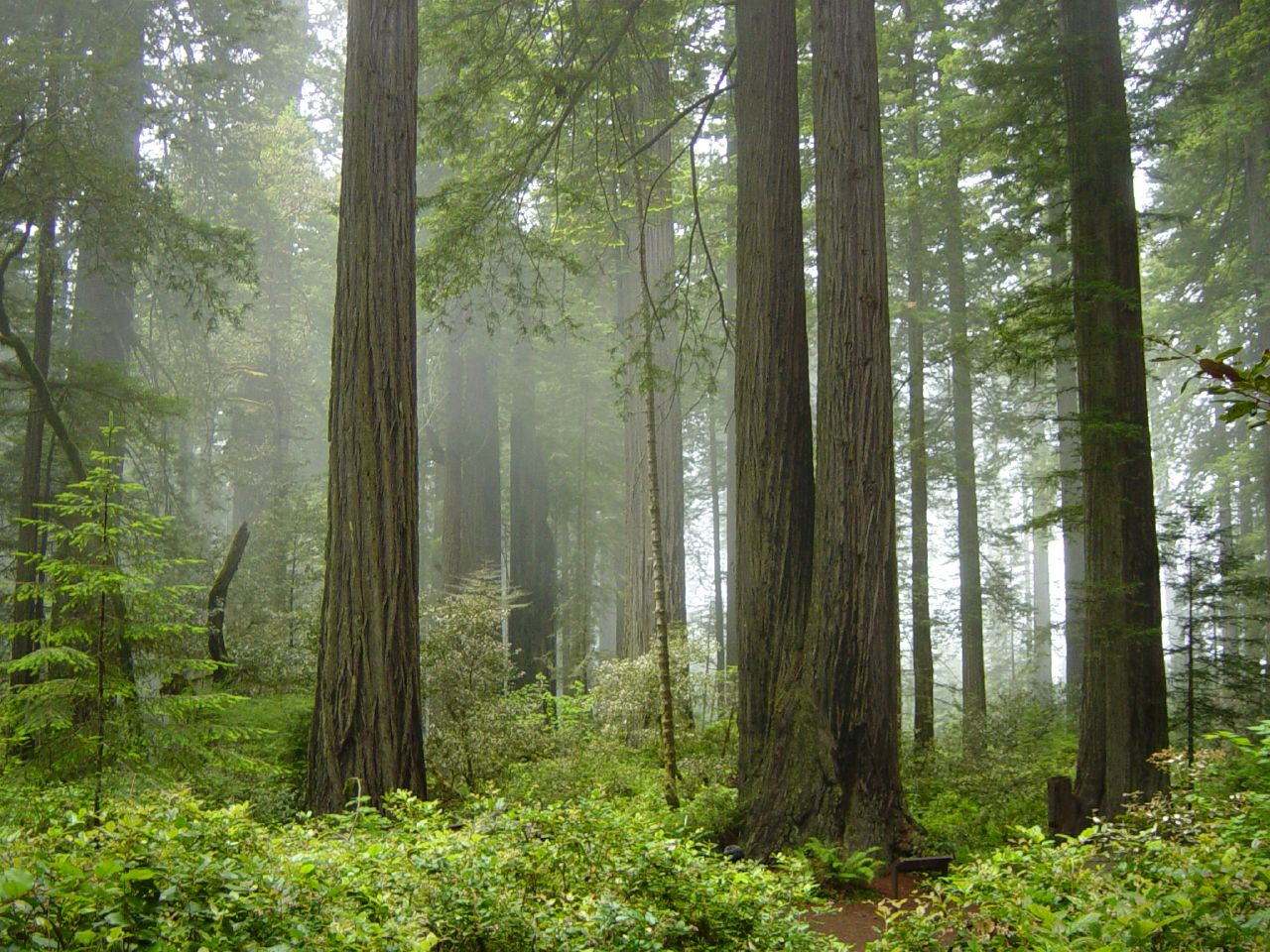
Redwood National Park in California

In 1979, when President Carter asked for the resignations of his entire Cabinet during an administration retreat at Camp David, the resignation of Andrus was not accepted.

Andrus wrote in his memoir about such a need for compromise relative to his successful, last-ditch efforts in securing passage of the Alaska Lands Act during the last month of the Carter Administration in December 1980, following Ronald Reagan's election in November: "The environmental groups were initially hostile. I actually had to listen to the idiotic argument (from the Wilderness Society and Sierra Club's paid Washington lobbyists) that they could get a better Alaska package out of Reagan and Watt."

"Cooler heads quickly prevailed", Andrus continues, "It proved the old adage that there's nothing like a hanging in the morning to focus the mind. Even though we were creating tomorrow's controversies, a 103-million acre [preservation] plan ... was a lot better than nothing."

=== Governor of Idaho again (1987–1995) ===
After several years in private life following his return to Idaho in 1981, Andrus surprised many by seeking and recapturing the Idaho governorship in 1986, when he defeated Republican Lieutenant Governor David Leroy in a close open seat election. The incumbent since succeeding Andrus in 1977, Evans had chosen to run for the U.S. Senate, but lost.

During this second stint as governor, Andrus vigorously opposed federal efforts to store nuclear waste in Idaho. He also brokered a path-breaking agreement among land use and conservation interests to control water pollution from nonpoint sources to protect riparian and fish habitat in Idaho's rivers and streams.

In September 1989, Andrus closed off the Idaho border to nuclear waste shipments from the federal government's Rocky Flats site near Denver. He initially agreed to open a temporary dump near Idaho Falls to store waste until the federal government agreed to open a site near Carlsbad, New Mexico. When the federal government failed to open the Carlsbad site, Andrus refused to accept shipments of plutonium from Rocky Flats. Secretary of Energy James D. Watkins did not challenge Andrus's authority to close the border.

In 1990, Andrus drew attention when he vetoed a bill, passed by the legislature, which "would have made abortion illegal except in cases of non-statutory rape reported within seven days, incest if the victim was under 18, severe fetal deformity or where the pregnancy posed a threat to the mother's life." Andrus was easily re-elected later that year against conservative Republican state senator Roger Fairchild of Fruitland, and won every county except Lemhi and Jefferson.

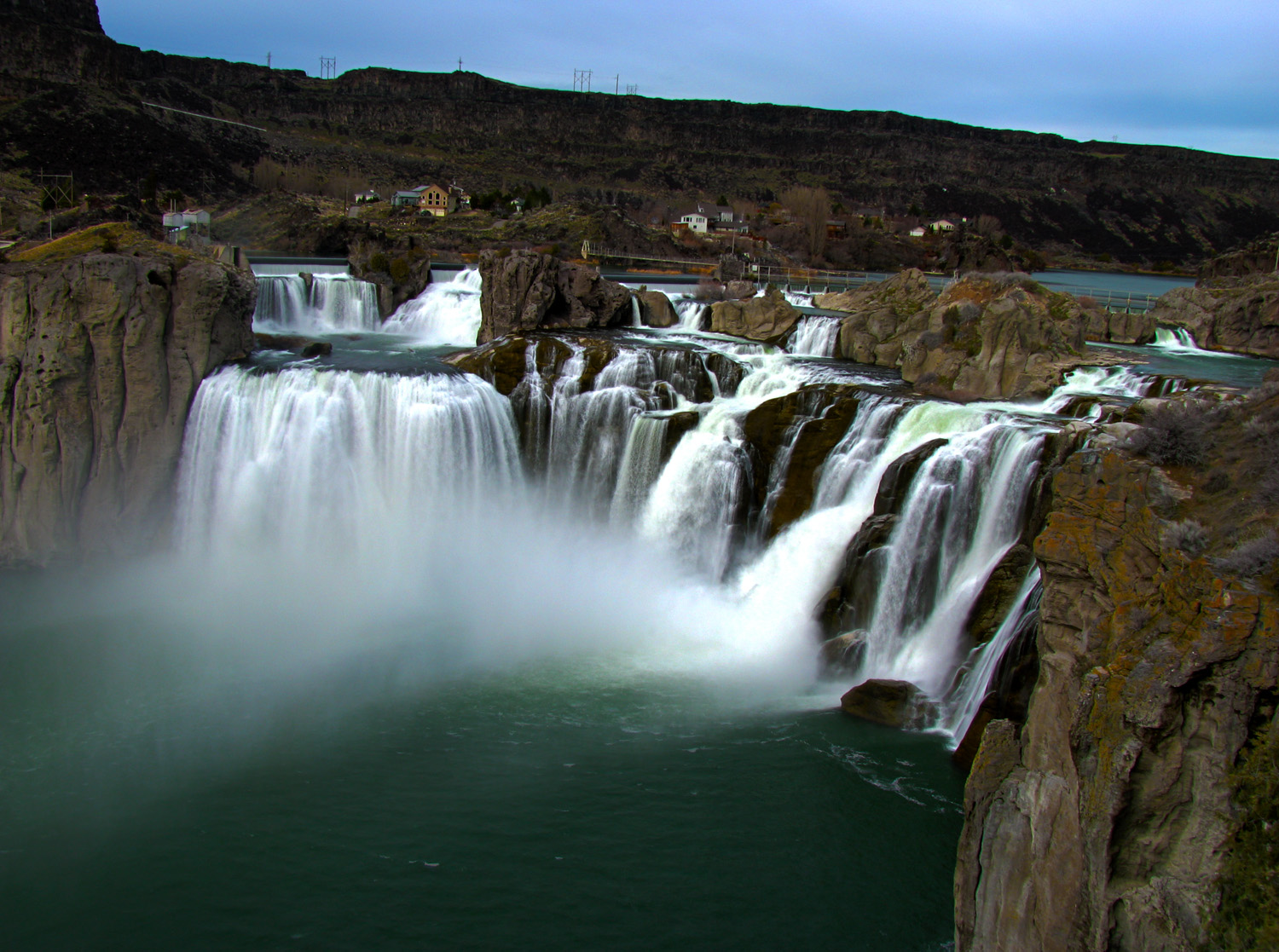
The Snake River's Shoshone Falls near Twin Falls, Idaho

In his fourth and final term as governor, Andrus was again in the national spotlight due to the Endangered Species Act listing of several Snake River salmon species. These anadromous fish species spawn in their natal streams in Idaho and migrate seaward at a young age. Governor Andrus called attention to the downstream federal dams operated by the Army Corps of Engineers as the major culprit. His successful lawsuit against the federal government led to incremental changes in operations of the dams, and to continuing efforts for major conservationist modifications to the dams that are ongoing today.

On April 3, 1990, he signed House Bill 817 into law, creating two new types of felony crimes, defined new criminal investigation areas, provided the basis for opening ritual child abuse cases based upon probable cause, and provided a framework for extensive ritual child abuse investigation training throughout Idaho.

Despite remaining personally popular, Andrus did not seek a fifth term in 1994. At his death in 2017, he was the eleventh longest-serving governor in U.S. history. Andrus was succeeded by Phil Batt of Wilder, the first Republican to win a gubernatorial election in Idaho since 1966; he served a single term and did not seek a second in 1998. Andrus's re-election in 1990 was the sixth straight gubernatorial win by Democrats in Idaho (Evans in 1978, 1982), but is the most recent; Republicans have since won eight consecutive, through 2022.

=== Election results ===
Idaho Gubernatorial Elections: Results 1966–1974, 1986–1990
Year	Democrat	Votes	Pct	Republican	Votes	Pct	3rd Party	Party	Votes	Pct	3rd Party	Party	Votes	Pct
1966	Cecil Andrus	93,744	37.1%	Don Samuelson	104,586	41.4%	Perry Swisher	Independent	30,913	12.2%	Phillip Jungert	Independent	23,139	9.2%
1970	Cecil Andrus	128,004	52.2%	Don Samuelson (inc.)	117,108	47.8%								
1974	Cecil Andrus (inc.)	184,142	70.9%	Jack Murphy	68,731	26.5%	Nolan Victor	American	6,759	2.6%				
1986	Cecil Andrus	193,429	49.9%	David Leroy	189,794	49.0%	James A. Miller	Independent	4,203	1.1%				
1990	Cecil Andrus (inc.)	217,801	68.1%	Roger Fairchild	101,885	31.9%								

== Elder statesman ==
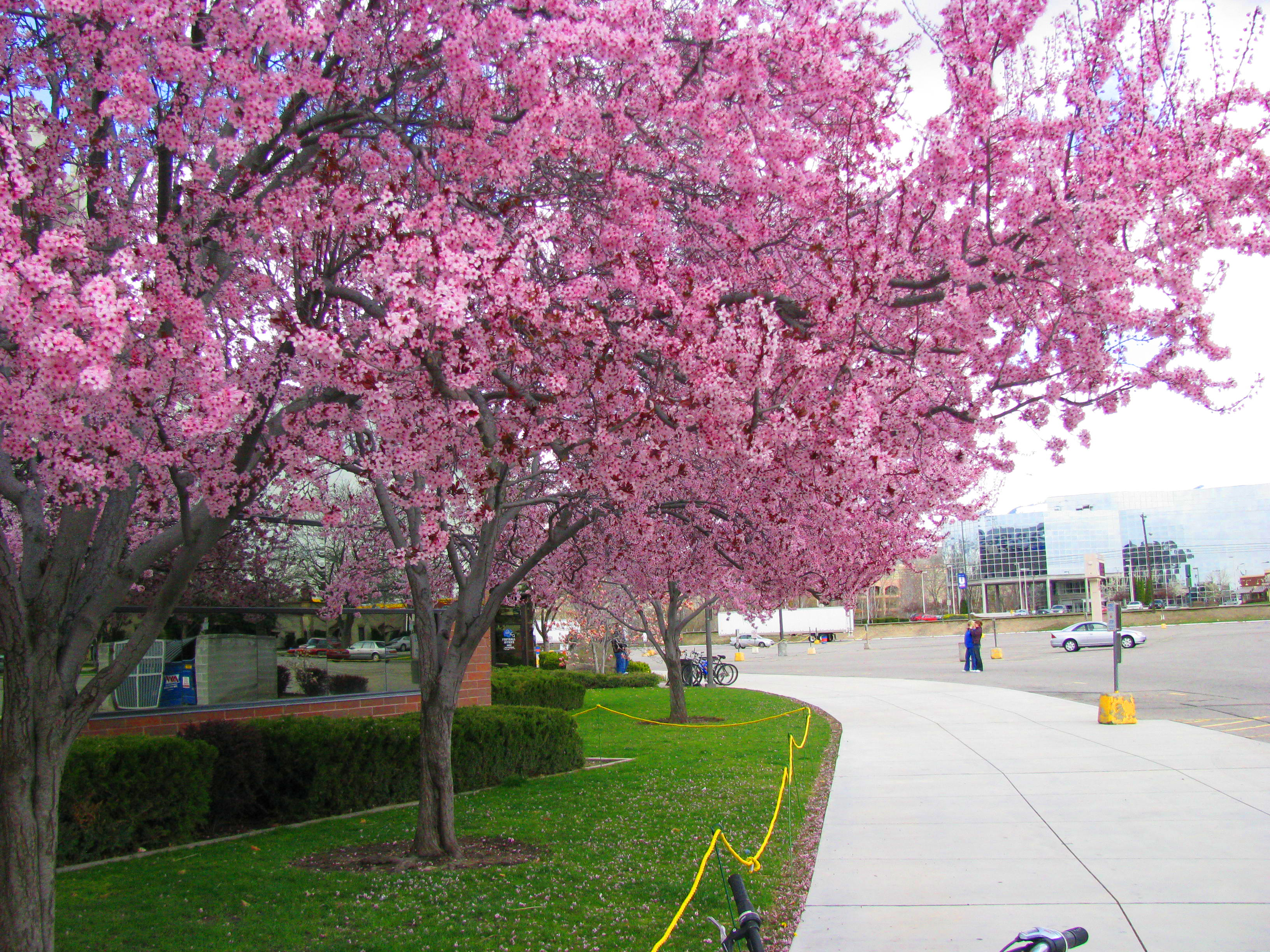
Spring at Boise State University

A wildlife preservation area in Idaho established in 1993, eighteen miles (30 km) from Cambridge in Washington County, is named the Cecil D. Andrus Wildlife Management Area in his honor.

In 1995, Andrus founded the Andrus Center for Public Policy at Boise State University, and in 1998, published his memoir, Politics Western Style.

An elementary school opened in 1997 in west Boise by the West Ada School District was named the Cecil D. Andrus Elementary School in his honor.

Andrus remained active in the Idaho Democratic Party in the early 21st Century and continued to campaign on behalf of other Democrats. In 2006, Andrus served as campaign treasurer for Idaho Democratic gubernatorial nominee Jerry Brady. In February 2008, Andrus endorsed and campaigned actively on behalf of Illinois Senator Barack Obama in Boise.

At what was described as the "second biggest political rally in Idaho history", by The New York Times, Andrus introduced Obama and recalled hearing John F. Kennedy speak years earlier: "I'm older now, some would suggest in the twilight of a mediocre political career", Andrus said, "[but] I, like you, can still be inspired. I can still hope."

In the closing page of his memoir, Andrus quotes the poet Robert Frost: "We should not have to care so much, you and I." "But we do care", Andrus continues, "and we should. We care about the future ... I remain hopeful that I will be able to pass on to my grandchildren all the pleasures of life in an unspoiled West. Perhaps hope should be replaced by a stronger word. It is a matter of obligation."

A 2011 book on Andrus and his career in public service described him as "Idaho's greatest governor".

== Death ==
Andrus died on August 24, 2017, in Boise, just one day before his 86th birthday, of complications from lung cancer.

== Bibliography ==
- Andrus, Cecil D., with Joel Connelly, Politics Western Style, Sasquatch Books, Seattle, 1998; ISBN 1-57061-122-X
- Becher, Anne, and Joseph Richey, American Environmental Leaders: From Colonial Times to the Present (2 vol, 2nd ed. 2008) vol 1 online pp. 27–29.
- Carlson, Chris - Cecil Andrus: Idaho's Greatest Governor, Caxton Press, October 2011; ISBN 0-87004-505-9

Party political offices
Preceded by Charles Herndon	Democratic nominee for Governor of Idaho; 1966, 1970, 1974	Succeeded by John V. Evans
Preceded by John V. Evans	Democratic nominee for Governor of Idaho; 1986, 1990	Succeeded by Larry Echo Hawk
Political offices
Preceded by Don Samuelson	Governor of Idaho; 1971–1977	Succeeded by John V. Evans
Preceded by Robert D. Ray	Chair of the National Governors Association; 1976–1977	Succeeded by Reubin Askew
Preceded by Thomas S. Kleppe	United States Secretary of the Interior; 1977–1981	Succeeded by James G. Watt
Preceded by John V. Evans	Governor of Idaho; 1987–1995	Succeeded by Phil Batt
