= 1978 Idaho gubernatorial election =

- November 7, 1978
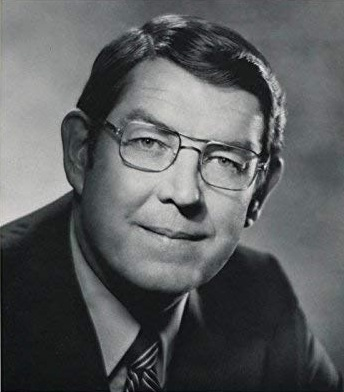

Nominee	John Evans	Allan Larsen
Party	Democratic	Republican
Popular vote	169,540	114,149
Percentage	58.75%	39.56%
- County results Evans: 50–60% 60–70% 70–80% Larsen: 50–60% 60–70% 70–80%
Governor before election
John Evans
Democratic
Elected Governor
John V. Evans
Democratic

The 1978 Idaho gubernatorial election was held on Tuesday, November 7, and incumbent Democrat John Evans defeated Republican nominee Allan Larsen with 58.75% of the vote. It was the third consecutive win for the Democrats (1970, 1974, 1978), but the only significant victory for the party in Idaho in 1978.

== Primary elections ==
Primary elections were held on Tuesday, August 8, 1978.

=== Democratic primary ===
==== Candidates ====
- John Evans, Malad, incumbent

==== Results ====
Evans ran unopposed in the Democratic primary. Elected lieutenant governor in 1974, he succeeded Cecil Andrus in January 1977, who left to become U.S. Secretary of the Interior in the new Carter Administration.

=== Republican primary ===
Entering the primary, Vern Ravenscroft and Butch Otter were the apparent front runners, but were upset by Larsen.

==== Candidates ====
- Allan Larsen, Blackfoot, Speaker of the Idaho House of Representatives
- Vern Ravenscroft, Tuttle, former state representative
- Butch Otter, Caldwell, former state representative
- Larry Jackson, Boise, state representative, former MLB pitcher
- James Crowe, Coeur d'Alene, home builder
- Jay Amyx, Boise, former mayor

==== Results ====
Republican primary results
Party	Candidate	Votes	%
Republican	Allan Larsen	33,778	28.73
Republican	Vern Ravenscroft	32,455	27.61
Republican	Butch Otter	30,523	25.97
Republican	Larry Jackson	13,510	11.49
Republican	James Crowe	4,447	3.78
Republican	Jay S. Amyx	2,842	2.42
Total votes		117,555	100.00

== General election ==
The election was notable as it was the first time Idaho elected a governor from the Church of Jesus Christ of Latter-day Saints. Both major candidates were members, and through 2023, Evans remains the only Mormon to be elected governor in the state.

=== Candidates ===
Major party candidates

- John Evans, Democratic
- Allan Larsen, Republican

Other candidates

- Wayne Loveless, American

=== Results ===
1978 Idaho gubernatorial election
Party	Candidate	Votes	%	±%
Democratic	John Evans (incumbent)	169,540	58.75%	
Republican	Allan Larsen	114,149	39.56%	
American	Wayne Loveless	4,877	1.69%	
Majority		55,391		
Turnout		288,566		
Democratic hold		Swing		
