= Office of the United States Nuclear Waste Negotiator =

The Office of the United States Nuclear Waste Negotiator was a short-lived independent agency of the federal government of the United States during the late 1980s and early 1990s. The agency was responsible for the placement and long-term storage of radioactive waste in the United States. It was created under the auspices of the Nuclear Waste Policy Act.

Although the agency was created in 1987, it remained without a head until 1990, when President George H. W. Bush appointed former Idaho Lieutenant Governor David Leroy, a Republican, to be the first United States Nuclear Waste Negotiator. In a 1991 speech to the National Congress of American Indians, Leroy stated the Native American's tradition of long-term culture made them especially suited for storing nuclear waste, including quotes from Chief Seattle. This led to sharp negative reactions from the audience, calling it Machiavellian and Orwellian.

In 1993 President Bill Clinton replaced Leroy with former Democratic Congressman Richard Stallings, also from Idaho.

The agency was eliminated in 1995.

== United States Nuclear Waste Negotiators ==
Name	State of Residence	Year appointed	President(s) served under
David Leroy	Idaho	1990	George H. W. Bush
Richard Stallings	Idaho	1993	Bill Clinton
