= 1966 Idaho gubernatorial election =

- November 8, 1966
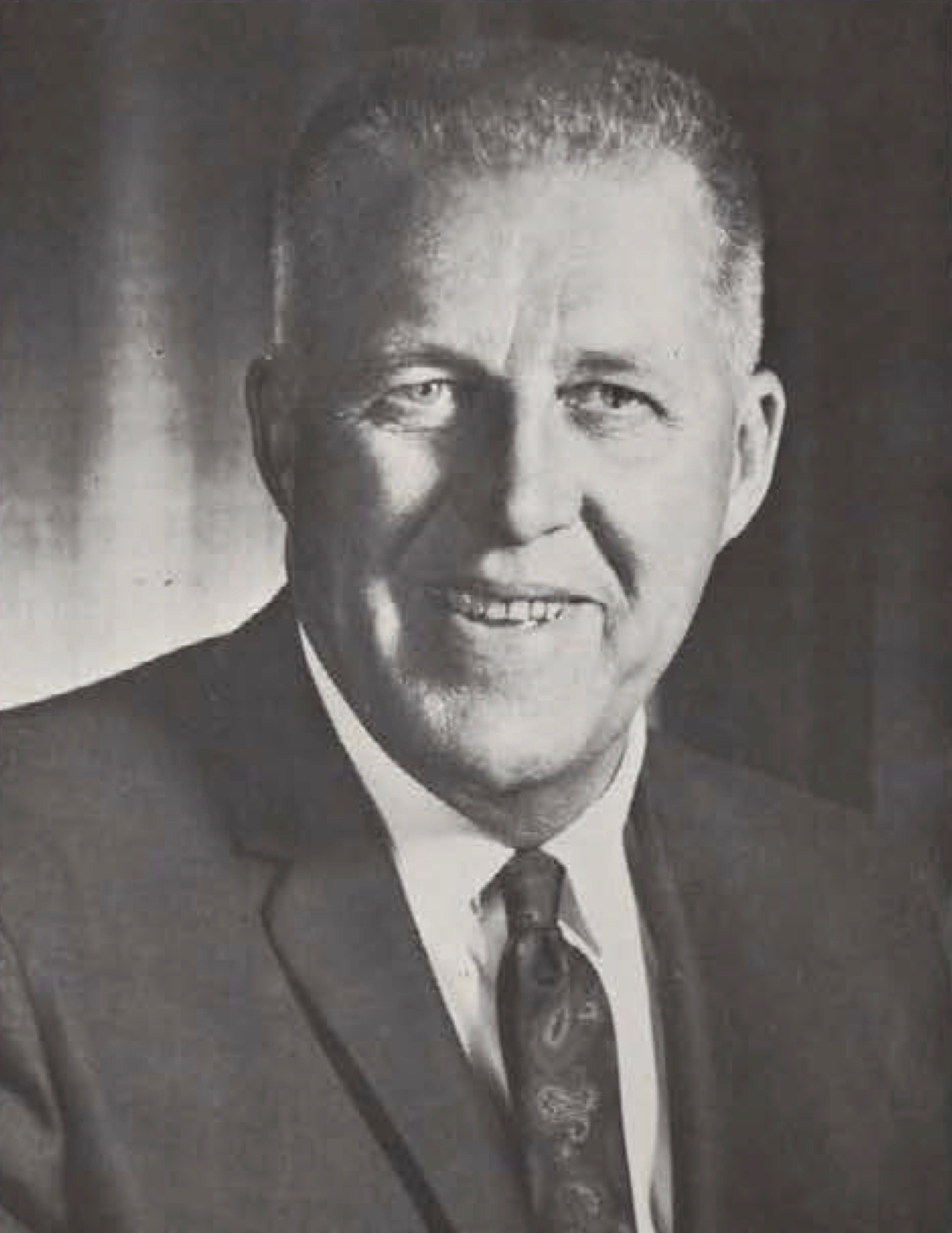

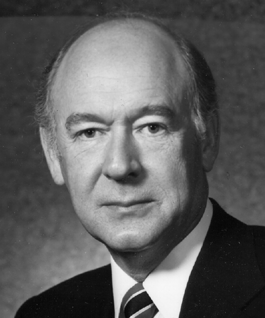

Nominee	Don Samuelson	Cecil Andrus (replacing Charles Herndon)
Party	Republican	Democratic
Popular vote	104,586	93,744
Percentage	41.41%	37.11%
Nominee	Perry Swisher	Philip Jungert
Party	Independent	Independent
Popular vote	30,913	23,139
Percentage	12.24%	9.16%
- County results Samuelson: 30–40% 40–50% 50–60% 60–70% Andrus: 30–40% 40–50% 50–60% 60–70%
Governor before election
Robert E. Smylie
Republican
Elected Governor
Don Samuelson
Republican

The 1966 Idaho gubernatorial election was held on November 8. Republican nominee Don Samuelson defeated Democratic nominee Cecil Andrus with 41.4% of the vote in a four-way race (two independents).

In early August, three-term incumbent Robert E. Smylie, the dean of American governors, was soundly defeated in the Republican primary by Samuelson. Andrus was a close runner-up in the Democratic primary to Charles Herndon, who was killed in a plane crash six weeks later in September.

This was the sixth consecutive Republican victory for governor, but Democrats won the next six, with four by Andrus. The next gubernatorial election in 1970 was a rematch, with different results.

== Primary elections ==
Primary elections were held on August 2, 1966.

=== Democratic primary ===
==== Candidates ====
- Charles Herndon, Salmon attorney
- Cecil Andrus, Orofino state senator
- William J. Dee, Grangeville state senator

==== Results ====
Democratic primary results
Party	Candidate	Votes	%
Democratic	Charles Herndon	28,926	40.75
Democratic	Cecil Andrus	27,649	38.95
Democratic	William J. Dee	14,409	20.30
Total votes		70,984	100.00

- Herndon was killed in a plane crash in the central Idaho mountains in mid-September.

=== Republican primary ===
==== Candidates ====
- Don Samuelson, Sandpoint state senator
- Robert E. Smylie, three-term incumbent governor

==== Results ====
Republican primary results
Party	Candidate	Votes	%
Republican	Don Samuelson	52,891	61.04
Republican	Robert E. Smylie (incumbent)	33,753	38.96
Total votes		86,644	100.00

== General election ==
=== Candidates ===
Major party candidates

- Don Samuelson, Republican
- Cecil Andrus, Democratic

Other candidates

- Perry Swisher, Independent, Pocatello state senator (Republican)
- Philip Jungert, Independent, Lewiston businessman (Democrat)

=== Results ===
1966 Idaho gubernatorial election
Party	Candidate	Votes	%	±%
Republican	Don Samuelson	104,586	41.41%	
Democratic	Cecil Andrus	93,744	37.11%	
Independent	Perry Swisher	30,913	12.24%	
Independent	Philip Jungert	23,139	9.16%	
Majority		10,842		
Turnout		252,593		
Republican hold		Swing		
