= Reed Budge =

American politician (1921–1987)

35th President pro tempore of the Idaho Senate
- In office 1978–1982
- Preceded by: Phil Batt
- Succeeded by: Jim Risch

Member of the Idaho Senate from the 32nd district
- In office 1967 – December 1, 1986

Personal details
- Born: Reed William Budge; January 7, 1921 Logan, Utah, U.S.
- Died: August 7, 1987 (aged 66) Soda Springs, Idaho, U.S.
- Party: Republican
- Spouse: Gwen Steffensen
- Children: 5
- Relatives: Hamer H. Budge
- Education: Utah State University

Military service
- Branch/service: United States Army
- Battles/wars: World War II

Reed William Budge (January 7, 1921 – August 7, 1987) was an American politician and rancher. He was a member of the Idaho Senate, for a time serving as President pro tempore.

== Early life and education ==
Budge was born on January 7, 1921 in Logan, Utah, to Thomas B. and Duella A. Budge. He was a relative of former U.S. congressman Hamer H. Budge and Idaho Supreme Court justice Alfred Budge. Budge graduated from Utah State University in 1946 and attended University of Chicago Medical School.

== Career ==
Budge served in Europe during World War II as a medic in the United States Army with General George Patton's 2nd Armored Division and was wounded in the Battle of the Bulge. During his military service, Budge was awarded a Purple Heart and three Bronze Star Medals for "acts of valor in combat". On January 5, 1945, during the Battle of the Bulge, Budge distinguished himself by "gallantry in action" near the town of Beffe. Belgium and was awarded the Silver Star. After the war, Budge was a cattle rancher in Soda Springs, Idaho.

In 1963, Budge was elected county commissioner of Caribou County, Idaho. In 1967, he was appointed to complete a term as a Republican in the Idaho Senate. During his time in the state senate for the 32nd district, Budge served as Chairman of the Transportation committee and sat on the Health, Environment, Education and Welfare committees. He was elected as pro tempore of the Idaho Senate in 1978, serving until 1982 when he was succeeded by Jim Risch. Budge also maintained an attendance record, described by a newspaper as "one of the most remarkable", not missing a Senate session for 12 years until 1978, when a family death forced him to miss one. He retired from the senate in 1986.

== Personal life ==
Budge married Gwen Steffensen in 1943 and had five children, Reed Douglas, Linda Duella, Randall Christian, Brian William, and Suzanne. Budge died on August 7, 1987, aged 66, at his home in Soda Springs, from an aneurysm.
