= 1980 United States Senate election in Idaho =

- November 4, 1980
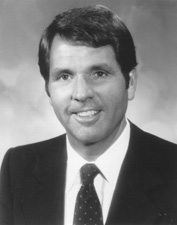

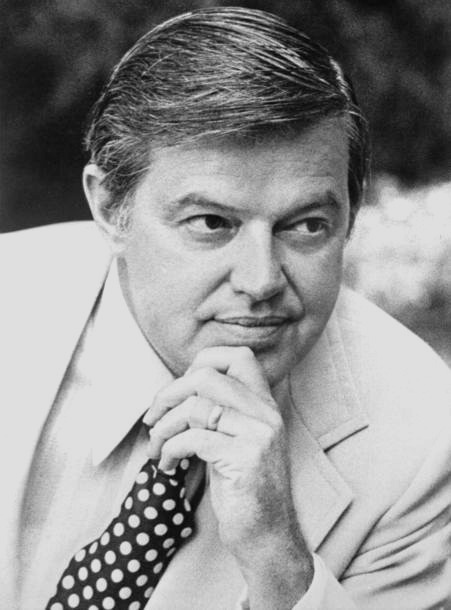
Nominee	Steve Symms	Frank Church
Party	Republican	Democratic
Popular vote	218,701	214,439
Percentage	49.74%	48.78%
- County results Symms: 40–50% 50–60% 60–70% 70–80% Church: 40–50% 50–60% 60–70%
U.S. senator before election
Frank Church
Democratic
Elected U.S. Senator
Steve Symms
Republican

The 1980 United States Senate election in Idaho took place on November 4, 1980, alongside other elections to the United States Senate in other states as well as elections to the United States House of Representatives and various state and local elections. Incumbent Democrat Frank Church ran for a fifth term and narrowly lost to Republican Steve Symms.

This is the last time that a Senator from Idaho lost re-election. Since Symms took office in 1981, Republicans have held both of Idaho's U.S. Senate seats, which they had not done since 1957.

== General election ==
=== Candidates ===
- Frank Church, incumbent U.S. Senator (Democratic)
- Larry Fullmer (Libertarian)
- Steve Symms, U.S. Representative from Caldwell (Republican)

=== Campaign ===
Entering the election, Church was seen as vulnerable because he was a liberal Senator representing one of the most conservative states. Nevertheless, Church was considered by many to be the favorite, with even prominent Republicans in the state not giving his opponent, 1st congressional district Representative Steve Symms much of a chance to unseat Church.

However, due to a variety of factors, the dynamic of the race would soon shift. For one, the race was affected by the concurrent Presidential Election, in which Ronald Reagan's coattails were anticipated to have an effect. Another factor was an influx of out-of-state money affecting the campaigns. Church and Symms both raised considerable sums from out of state donors from states such as Texas and Florida, and by the campaigns end, both had spent close to $3.5 million, a state record.

Moreover, groups such as the ABC (Anybody But Church), which was affiliated with the NCPAC (National Conservative Political Action Committee), spent big on advertisements and mailers to damage Church's standing. Church criticized these efforts as using the big lie. These factors, plus criticism over his stance on the Panama Canal Treaties, made this a difficult campaign for the Senator.

=== Polling ===
Polls throughout the election showed Church up by small margins, highlighting the race's closeness. Even in the final days, it had been believed that a large number of voters remained undecided.

== Results ==
In the end, Church lost by a margin of 4,262 votes or 0.96%. Many reasons were attributed to Church's defeat. One reason was that Ronald Reagan's landslide victory caused a coattail effect that Church couldn't overcome. Another one was Jimmy Carter's early concession. Because Carter had conceded before polls closed in the Panhandle (which is in Pacific Time as opposed to the rest of the state, which is in Mountain Time), this was believed to have depressed voters in one of Church's strongest regions. There was also the factor of shifts among Mormon voters, who due to a focus on moral issues such as abortion, turned away from Church in the Eastern part of the state.

1980 U.S. Senate election in Idaho
Party	Candidate	Votes	%	±%
Republican	Steve Symms	218,701	49.74%	▲7.61
Democratic	Frank Church (incumbent)	214,439	48.78%	▼7.30
Libertarian	Larry Fullmer	6,507	1.48%	N/A
Majority		4,262	0.97%	−12.96%
Turnout		439,647		+41.13%
Republican gain from Democratic				

== See also ==
- 1980 United States Senate elections
