= Roger Fairchild =

American politician (born 1953)

Member of the Idaho Senate from the 10th district
- In office November 1980 – January 10, 1990
- Preceded by: Larry Craig
- Succeeded by: Mary Hartung

Personal details
- Born: c. 1953 (age 72–73)
- Party: Republican

Roger Fairchild (born c. 1953) is an American politician from Fruitland, Idaho, active in the 1980s and early 1990s. He was the Republican nominee for governor of Idaho in 1990, but was defeated in a landslide by the Democratic incumbent, Cecil Andrus.

Fairchild was a member of the Idaho Senate from 1980 to 1990, when he resigned to run for governor.

In 2002, Fairchild announced his candidacy for state senate, running for the 9th district. He was defeated in the Republican primary by Monty Pearce.

Party political offices
Preceded by David H. Leroy	Republican Party nominee, Governor of Idaho; 1990 (lost)	Succeeded by Phil Batt
