= David Leroy =

American politician

United States Nuclear Waste Negotiator
- In office 1990–1993
- President: George H. W. Bush
- Preceded by: position established
- Succeeded by: Richard H. Stallings

36th Lieutenant Governor of Idaho
- In office January 3, 1983 – January 5, 1987
- Governor: John Evans
- Preceded by: Phil Batt
- Succeeded by: Butch Otter

28th Attorney General of Idaho
- In office January 1, 1979 – January 3, 1983
- Governor: John Evans
- Preceded by: Wayne Kidwell
- Succeeded by: Jim Jones

Prosecuting Attorney of Ada County, Idaho
- In office 1974–1979

Personal details
- Born: David Henry Leroy; August 16, 1947 (age 79) Seattle, Washington, U.S.
- Party: Republican
- Education: University of Idaho (BS, JD); New York University (LLM)
- Website: Official website, campaign website

David Henry Leroy (born August 16, 1947) is an American lawyer and politician from Idaho. He is a past lieutenant governor and attorney general of Idaho. He was the state's 36th lieutenant governor between 1983 and 1987, the final four years of the administration of Governor John V. Evans.

Leroy was appointed by President George H. W. Bush as United States Nuclear Waste Negotiator in 1990, and served in that capacity until 1993. He has been a practicing attorney in Boise since 1988, and deals with government and administrative law issues, criminal defense and family law trials, hearings, litigation, and counsel at local, state, and federal local levels.

== Early life and education ==
Leroy was born 16 August 1947 in Idaho. He graduated from Lewiston High School in 1965, before attending the University of Idaho in Moscow, where he was ASUI president (1967–68) and a member of Sigma Alpha Epsilon fraternity. After receiving a bachelor's degree in business in 1969, he continued at the College of Law and earned a J.D. degree in 1971. He earned an LL.M. degree at New York University.

== Career ==
Leroy was elected prosecuting attorney in Ada County, Idaho, in 1974 and served two terms.

In 1978, Leroy was elected Attorney General of Idaho, easily defeating Boise attorney Mike Wetherell for the open seat. At the time, he was the youngest attorney general in the nation.

He was elected lieutenant governor in 1982 and succeeded Phil Batt, who was the Republican nominee for governor that year.

Leroy was the Republican nominee for governor in 1986, but narrowly lost in the general election to former Democratic governor Cecil Andrus.

Following his loss, Leroy was appointed the first head of the Office of the United States Nuclear Waste Negotiator in 1990, which identified Native American tribes that could host spent nuclear fuel. In a 1991 speech to the National Congress of American Indians, Leroy stated the Native American's tradition of long-term culture made them especially suited for storing nuclear waste, including quotes from Chief Seattle. This led to sharp negative reactions from the audience, calling it Machiavellian and Orwellian.

Because of the Indians' great care and regard for Nature's resources, Indians are the logical people to care for the nuclear waste. Radioactive materials have half-lives of thousands of years [and] it is the Native American culture and perspective that is best designed to correctly consider and balance the benefits and burdens.

— David Leroy

In 1994, Leroy ran for Congress in the first district and finished second in the Republican primary, behind Helen Chenoweth. He earned 27.8% of the vote.

Leroy announced his candidacy for the open seat in Congress in Idaho's first district on May 12, 2017. He lost the Republican primary in May 2018 to Russ Fulcher, taking second with 15.6% of the vote.

== Personal life ==
Leroy married Nancy, a former Miss Boise and Miss Boise State University. They have two children.

Leroy is a self-taught Abraham Lincoln expert, and founded the Idaho Lincoln Institute.

In 2009, Leroy signed a petition in support of Polish film director Roman Polanski, calling for his release after he was arrested in Switzerland in relation to his 1977 charge for drugging and anally raping a 13-year-old girl.

== Notes ==
Legal offices
Preceded by Wayne Kidwell	Attorney General of Idaho; 1979–1983	Succeeded by Jim Jones
Political offices
Preceded by Phil Batt	Lieutenant Governor of Idaho; 1983–1987	Succeeded by Butch Otter
New office	United States Nuclear Waste Negotiator; 1990–1993	Succeeded by Richard H. Stallings
Party political offices
Preceded by Phil Batt	Republican nominee for Governor of Idaho; 1986	Succeeded by Roger Fairchild
