= 1974 Idaho gubernatorial election =

- November 5, 1974
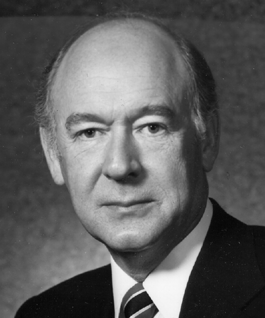

Nominee	Cecil Andrus	Jack Murphy
Party	Democratic	Republican
Popular vote	184,142	68,731
Percentage	70.92%	26.47%
- County results Andrus: 40–50% 50–60% 60–70% 70–80% 80–90% Murphy: 50–60%
Governor before election
Cecil Andrus
Democratic
Elected Governor
Cecil Andrus
Democratic

The 1974 Idaho gubernatorial election was held on Tuesday, November 5. Incumbent Democrat Cecil Andrus soundly defeated Republican nominee Jack Murphy, the lieutenant governor, with 70.92% of the vote.

== Primary elections ==
Primary elections were held on Tuesday, August 6, 1974; both major party candidates were unopposed.

=== Democratic primary ===
==== Candidate ====
- Cecil Andrus, Lewiston, incumbent governor

=== Republican primary ===
==== Candidate ====
- Jack Murphy, Shoshone, lieutenant governor

== General election ==
=== Candidates ===
Major party candidates

- Cecil Andrus, Democratic
- Jack Murphy, Republican

Other candidates

- Nolan Victor, American

=== Results ===
1974 Idaho gubernatorial election
Party	Candidate	Votes	%	±%
Democratic	Cecil Andrus (incumbent)	184,142	70.92%	
Republican	Jack Murphy	68,731	26.47%	
American	Nolan Victor	6,759	2.60%	
Majority		115,411		
Turnout		259,632		
Democratic hold		Swing		
