= Steve Symms =

American politician and lobbyist (1938–2024)

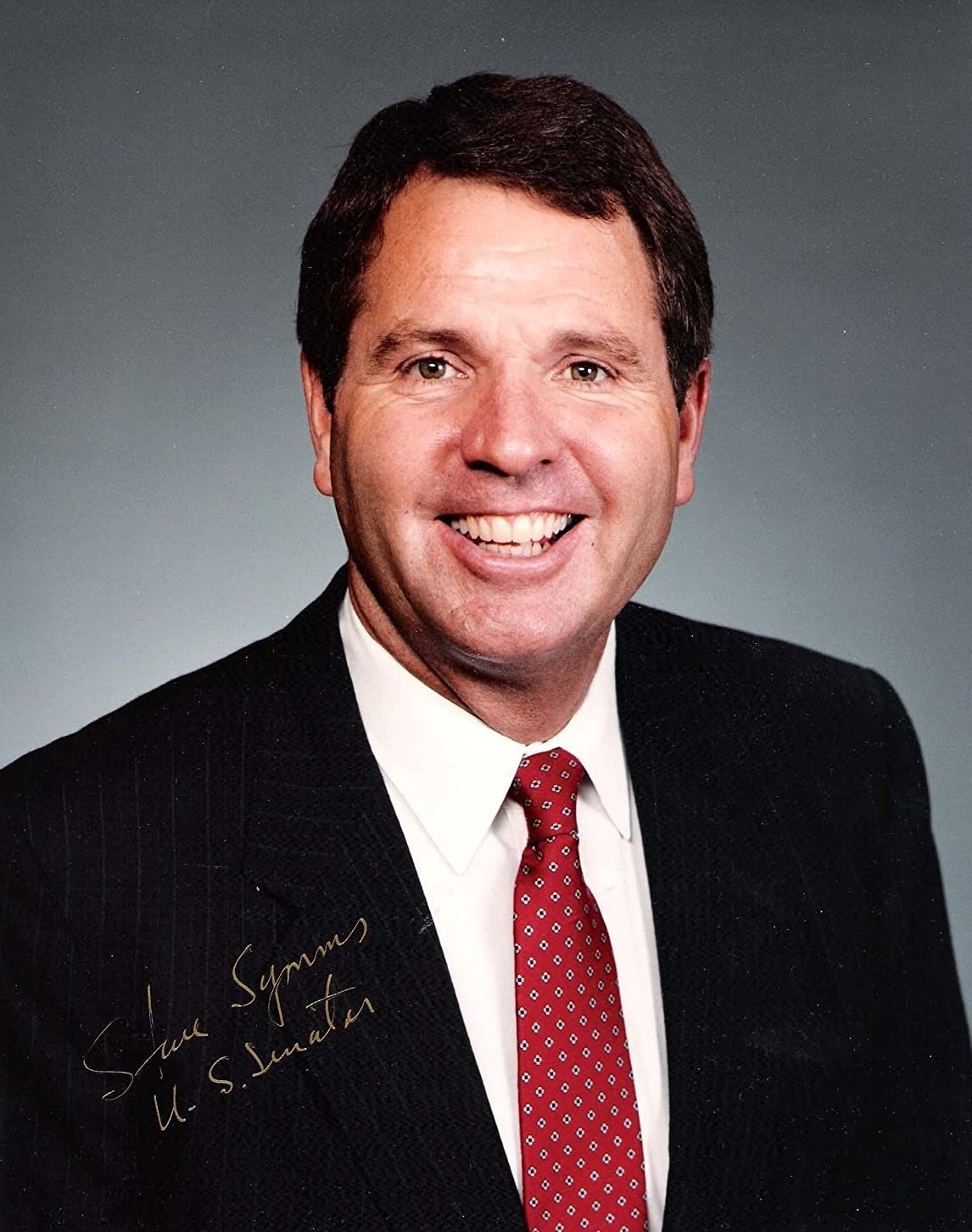

United States Senator from Idaho
- In office January 3, 1981 – January 3, 1993
- Preceded by: Frank Church
- Succeeded by: Dirk Kempthorne

Member of the U.S. House of Representatives from Idaho's 1st district
- In office January 3, 1973 – January 3, 1981
- Preceded by: Jim McClure
- Succeeded by: Larry Craig

Personal details
- Born: Steven Douglas Symms; April 23, 1938 Nampa, Idaho, U.S.
- Died: August 8, 2024 (aged 86) Leesburg, Virginia, U.S.
- Party: Republican
- Spouses: Frances Stockdale (m. 1959; div. 1990) Loretta E. Mathes (m. 1992; died 2023)
- Children: 4
- Education: University of Idaho (BA)

Military service
- Allegiance: United States
- Branch/service: United States Marine Corps
- Years of service: 1960–1963
- Rank: First Lieutenant

Steven Douglas Symms (April 23, 1938 – August 8, 2024) was an American politician and lobbyist who served as a four-term congressman (1973–1981) and two-term U.S. senator (1981–1993), representing Idaho. He later became a partner at Parry, Romani, DeConcini & Symms, a lobbying firm in Washington, D.C.

== Early life and education ==
Symms was born in Nampa, Idaho, on April 23, 1938. His family owned a fruit farm. He attended public schools in Canyon County and graduated from Caldwell High School in 1956. He studied horticulture at the University of Idaho in Moscow, where he was a reserve center on the football team and was a member of Sigma Nu fraternity. He graduated in 1960 with a B.S. in agriculture, then served in the United States Marine Corps for three years, after which he worked as a private pilot and apple farmer. From 1969 to 1972, he was co-editor of the college newspaper, The Idaho Compass.

== Career ==
=== Congress ===
In the 1972 United States House of Representatives elections, Symms became a representative for Idaho, highlighting his career as an apple farmer by using the slogan "Take a bite out of big government!" He was re-elected three times. Encouraged by James Jesus Angleton, a former officer of the Central Intelligence Agency officer disgruntled by the criticism of incumbent Frank Church, Symms ran in the 1980 election for one of Idaho's Senate seats. Aided by national funding, he unseated Church, winning by less than one percent. He was re-elected in 1986, defeating Democratic Governor John V. Evans in another close race.

Symms was one of several Republican senators who, in 1981, called into the White House to express discontent over the nomination of Sandra Day O'Connor to the Supreme Court. The opposition was based on O'Connor's presumed unwillingness to overturn Roe v. Wade, the seminal decision about abortion rights.

In 1985, Symms was one of four Republican Senators who voted against a resolution condemning apartheid. The four "no" votes came from Republican senators Symms, Jesse Helms of North Carolina, Barry Goldwater of Arizona, and Chic Hecht of Nevada. He was also one of the six senators who voted against the Americans With Disabilities Act of 1990.

During the 1988 U.S. presidential election, Symms claimed in a radio interview that a photograph existed from the 1960s showing Kitty Dukakis, the wife of Democratic presidential candidate Michael Dukakis, burning an American flag to protest the Vietnam War. Kitty Dukakis angrily denied the accusation as "totally false and beneath contempt," and Symms later admitted that he could not substantiate it. Nevertheless, the claim became national news, as media outlets began searching for the photograph Symms said he had "heard" about. The flag-burning story was one of several false rumors about Dukakis that circulated during the 1988 campaign. "Mr. Symms's comment was the third time in a few days that prominent Republicans have publicly aired allegations that the Democrats have swiftly rebutted," The New York Times reported.

According to Salon magazine, during Symms's time in Washington, he gained a reputation for cheating on his wife, Fran; nobody spoke up because they respected his right to keep such matters personal. When she finally divorced him, the affairs were made public, cratering his ratings enough for him to not seek reelection in 1992. He was succeeded by Dirk Kempthorne, at the time the mayor of Boise.

=== Later career ===
After leaving the U.S. Senate in 1993, Symms founded Symms, Lehn Associates, Inc., a consulting firm. In January 1999, he partnered with John Haddow and formed Symms & Haddow Associates, a lobbying firm. In January 2001, the firm joined forces with Romano Romani and former Senator Dennis DeConcini of Parry, Romani & DeConcini to form Parry, Romani, DeConcini & Symms.

== Personal life ==
Prior to his senior year at the University of Idaho, Symms married Frances E. "Fran" Stockdale of Helena, Montana, in August 1959. They had four children, a son and three daughters. Following his re-election in 1986, the couple separated, and their divorce was finalized in 1990. Although Symms declined to comment on the reason for the divorce, he was dogged by rumors of infidelity during his 1980s campaigns, claims which were eventually substantiated by his former wife. Symms married Loretta Mathes Fuller in 1992, a former aide and later the Deputy Sergeant of Arms of the U.S. Senate.

Symms was a cousin of former Oregon congressman Denny Smith.

Symms died at his home in Leesburg, Virginia, on August 8, 2024, at the age of 86.

== Elections ==
U.S. House elections (Idaho's 1st district): Results 1972–1978
Year	Democrat	Votes	Pct	Republican	Votes	Pct
1972	Ed Williams	68,106	44%	Steve Symms	85,270	56%
1974	J. Ray Cox	54,001	42%	Steve Symms (inc.)	75,404	58%
1976	Ken Pursley	79,662	45%	Steve Symms (inc.)	95,833	55%
1978	Roy Truby	57,972	40%	Steve Symms (inc.)	86,680	60%

U.S. Senate elections in Idaho (Class III): Results 1980–1986
Year	Democrat	Votes	Pct	Republican	Votes	Pct	3rd Party	Party	Votes	Pct
1980	Frank Church (inc.)	214,439	49%	Steve Symms	218,701	50%	Larry Fullmer	Libertarian	6,507	1%
1986	John V. Evans	185,066	48%	Steve Symms (inc.)	196,958	52%				

U.S. House of Representatives
Preceded by Jim McClure	United States House of Representatives, Idaho First Congressional District; January 3, 1973 – January 3, 1981	Succeeded by Larry Craig
Party political offices
Preceded by Robert L. Smith	Republican Party nominee, U.S. Senator (Class 3) from Idaho; 1980 (won), 1986 (won)	Succeeded by Dirk Kempthorne
U.S. Senate
Preceded by Frank Church	U.S. senator (Class 3) from Idaho; January 3, 1981 – January 5, 1993; Served alongside: Jim McClure, Larry Craig	Succeeded by Dirk Kempthorne
