= 1990 Idaho gubernatorial election =

- November 6, 1990
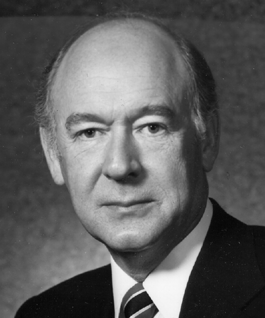

Nominee	Cecil Andrus	Roger Fairchild
Party	Democratic	Republican
Popular vote	218,673	101,937
Percentage	68.21%	31.79%
- County results Andrus: 50–60% 60–70% 70–80% 80–90% Fairchild: 50–60%
Governor before election
Cecil Andrus
Democratic
Elected Governor
Cecil Andrus
Democratic

The 1990 Idaho gubernatorial election was held on November 6, 1990, to elect the Governor of the state of Idaho. Cecil Andrus, the Democratic incumbent, ran for an unprecedented fourth term. Roger Fairchild, a former state senate majority leader from Fruitland, won the Republican nomination in May, but was easily defeated in November by the popular Andrus.

This was the sixth consecutive win for the Democrats, which started with Andrus' first victory twenty years earlier in 1970. As of 2026, this is the last time that a Democrat has been elected Governor of Idaho.

== Primary elections ==
Primary elections were held on May 22, 1990.

=== Democratic primary ===
==== Candidate ====
- Cecil Andrus, incumbent governor (unopposed)

=== Republican primary ===
==== Candidates ====
- Roger Fairchild, Fruitland executive, former state senator (majority leader)
- Rachel Gilbert, Boise, state senator
- Milt Erhart, Boise stockbroker

==== Results ====
Results by county Fairchild: 30–40%; 40–50%; 50–60%; Gilbert: 30–40%; 40–50%; Erhart: 30–40%; 40–50%; 50–60%; Tie: 30–40%

Republican primary results
Party	Candidate	Votes	%
Republican	Roger Fairchild	37,728	37.09
Republican	Rachel Gilbert	33,483	32.92
Republican	Milt Erhart	30,514	30.00
Total votes		101,725	100.00

== General election ==
=== Campaign ===
Although Fairchild attempted to capitalize on his business experience and Andrus' veto of a bill passed by the state legislature severely restricting abortion earlier in the year, the incumbent's personal popularity in Idaho proved to be too much to overcome.

=== Results ===
Idaho gubernatorial election, 1990
Party	Candidate	Votes	%	±%
Democratic	Cecil Andrus (inc.)	218,673	68.21%	+18.28%
Republican	Roger Fairchild	101,937	31.79%	−17.19%
Majority		116,736	36.41%	+35.47%
Turnout		320,610		
Democratic hold		Swing		

== See also ==
- Governor of Idaho
- List of governors of Idaho
- Idaho gubernatorial elections

Preceded by 1986	Idaho gubernatorial elections	Succeeded by 1994
