= Phil Batt =

American politician (1927–2023)

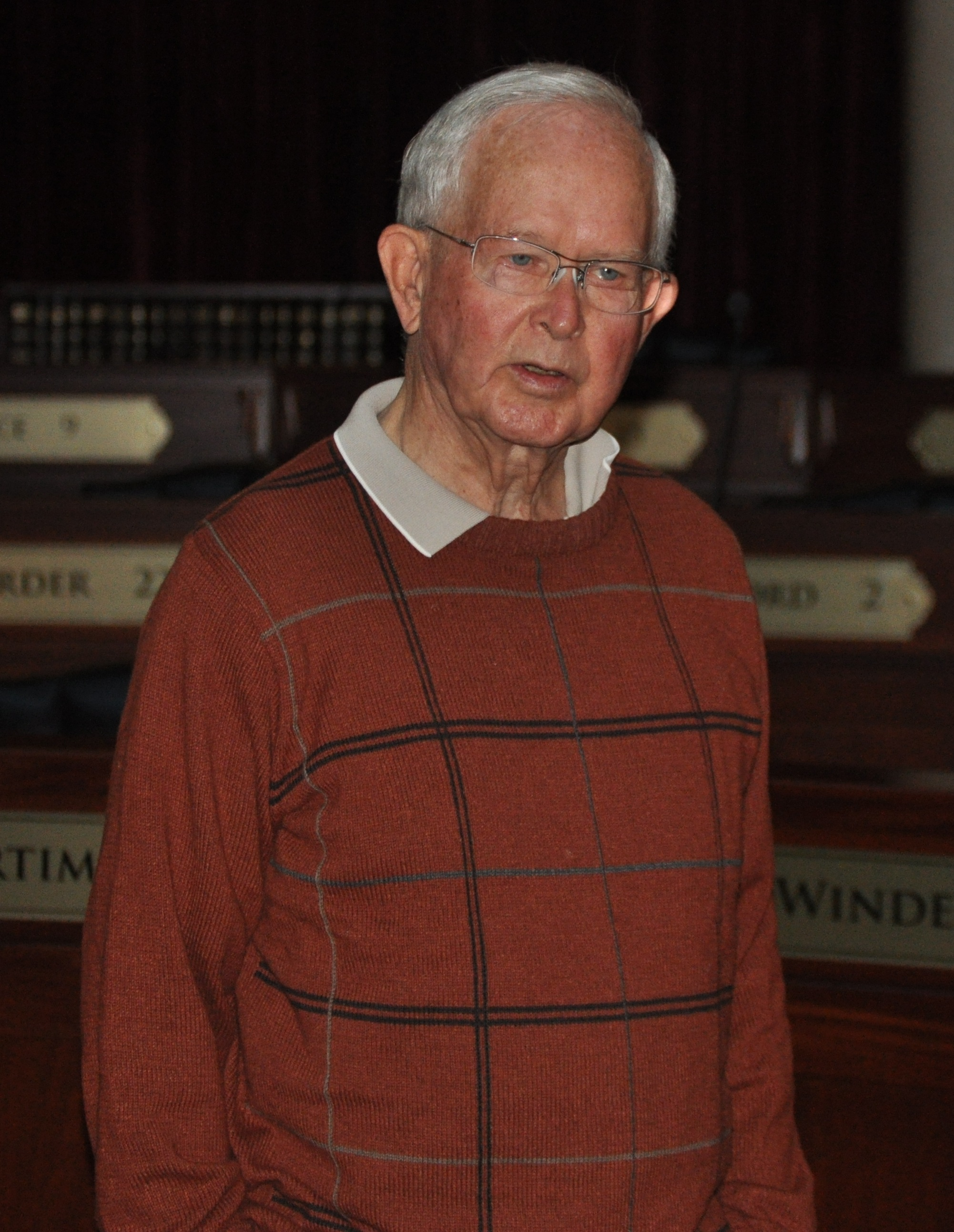
- Batt in 2010

29th Governor of Idaho
- In office January 2, 1995 – January 4, 1999
- Lieutenant: Butch Otter
- Preceded by: Cecil Andrus
- Succeeded by: Dirk Kempthorne

Chair of the Idaho Republican Party
- In office 1991–1993
- Preceded by: Randy Ayre
- Succeeded by: N. Randy Smith

35th Lieutenant Governor of Idaho
- In office January 1, 1979 – January 3, 1983
- Governor: John Evans
- Preceded by: William Murphy
- Succeeded by: David Leroy

34th President pro tempore of the Idaho Senate
- In office 1976–1978
- Preceded by: James Ellsworth
- Succeeded by: Reed Budge

Personal details
- Born: Philip Eugene Batt; March 4, 1927 Wilder, Idaho, U.S.
- Died: March 4, 2023 (aged 96)
- Party: Republican
- Spouses: Jacque Fallis (m. 1948; died 2014); Francee Reilly (m. 2015)
- Children: 3
- Education: University of Idaho (attended)

Military service
- Branch/service: United States Army
- Years of service: 1945–1946
- Unit: Army Air Forces
- Battles/wars: World War II

Philip Eugene Batt (March 4, 1927 – March 4, 2023) was an American politician who served as the 29th governor of Idaho from 1995 to 1999. A member of the Republican Party, Batt had previously served as the 35th lieutenant governor, chair of the Idaho Republican Party, and as a member of the Idaho Legislature.

== Early life and education ==
Born in Wilder, Idaho, Batt was the fifth and youngest child of John and Elizabeth Karn Batt. He graduated from Wilder High School. Batt served sixteen months in the United States Army Air Forces during and after World War II at Lowry Field, Colorado, working as a clerk discharging veterans. He then returned to the University of Idaho and studied chemical engineering, lived in the dorms, and led a dance band, playing clarinet and tenor saxophone. (Half a century later as governor, Batt played with Lionel Hampton in Moscow, Idaho at the jazz legend's UI festival.)

== Career ==
=== State offices ===
Before becoming governor, Batt had been a Republican politician in Idaho for thirty years, serving in the state legislature (house 1965–1967, state senate 1967–1979), and as the 35th lieutenant governor from 1979 to 1983. He ran for governor in 1982 and was defeated in a close race by the Democratic incumbent, John Evans. The election was so close that at least one television network declared Batt the winner on election night.

Batt returned to the state senate with victories in 1984 and 1986, then resigned in the spring of 1988 to sit on the three-member state transportation board, appointed by Governor Cecil Andrus.

=== Idaho Republican Party ===
Batt was elected chairman of the Idaho Republican Party in January 1991, and after a successful two years, he stepped aside in April 1993 to re-enter electoral politics in 1994. Batt had previously run for the post in 1968 and lost to Roland Wilber, 127 to 218.

=== Governor ===
Batt won the Republican gubernatorial primary in 1994 with 48% of the vote, and defeated state attorney general Larry Echo Hawk in the general election 52% to 44%, for the first GOP victory for governor in 28 years. Despite high popularity, he chose to serve only one term, citing his age, and left office at age 71. Among Batt's more notable accomplishments as governor was pushing through worker's compensation for agricultural workers and negotiating a pact limiting nuclear waste storage in Idaho.

=== Later career ===
Batt was one of Idaho's presidential electors for George W. Bush during the 2000 United States presidential election. Batt self-published two books after leaving office, a memoir titled The Compleat Phil Batt: A Kaleidoscope in 1999, and a compilation of humorous stories, Life as a Geezer, in 2003. Batt, who had a gay grandson, supported Add The Words.

=== Memorials ===
Boise has two memorials to Batt, with both acknowledging his work while in government: the Philip E. Batt Building of the Wassmuth Center for Human Rights, which opened in October 2024, as well as the Philip E. Batt Building of the Idaho Transportation Department, dedicated as such in June 2013.

== Personal life ==
On January 9, 1948, in Potlatch, Idaho, Batt eloped with Jacque Fallis of Spokane, a member of the Delta Delta Delta sorority. The newlyweds had to leave school a month later when Batt's 66-year-old father was involved in a serious automobile accident which left him with limited strength and speech. Though the young Batts initially hoped to return to college, economic circumstances changed their plans and they reluctantly did not.

Jacque Batt died on September 7, 2014, after 66 years of marriage. In 2015, at age 88, Batt married Francee Riley of Boise. Batt died on March 4, 2023, the morning of his 96th birthday.

== Election history ==
Idaho Gubernatorial Elections: Results 1982, 1994
Year	Democrat	Votes	Pct	Republican	Votes	Pct	3rd Party	Party	Votes	Pct
1982	John Evans (inc.)	165,365	50.6%	Phil Batt	161,157	49.4%				
1994	Larry Echo Hawk	181,363	43.9%	Phil Batt	216,123	52.3%	Ronald Rankin	Independent	15,793	3.8%

Idaho Senate
Preceded by James Ellsworth	President pro tempore of the Idaho Senate; 1976–1978	Succeeded by Reed Budge
Political offices
Preceded by William Murphy	Lieutenant Governor of Idaho; 1979–1983	Succeeded by David H. Leroy
Preceded by Cecil D. Andrus	Governor of Idaho; 1995–1999	Succeeded by Dirk Kempthorne
Party political offices
Preceded by Allan Larsen	Republican nominee for Governor of Idaho; 1982	Succeeded by David H. Leroy
Preceded by Randy Ayre	Chair of the Idaho Republican Party; 1991–1993	Succeeded by N. Randy Smith
Preceded by Roger Fairchild	Republican nominee for Governor of Idaho; 1994	Succeeded by Dirk Kempthorne
