= 1986 United States Senate election in Idaho =

- November 4, 1986
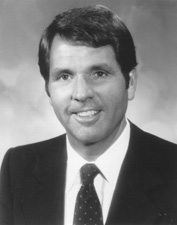

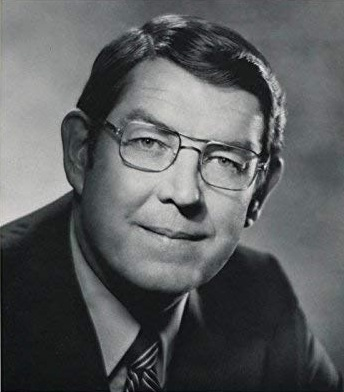
Nominee	Steve Symms	John V. Evans
Party	Republican	Democratic
Popular vote	196,958	185,066
Percentage	51.56%	48.44%
- County results Symms: 50–60% 60–70% 70–80% Evans: 50–60% 60–70%
U.S. senator before election
Steve Symms
Republican
Elected U.S. Senator
Steve Symms
Republican

The 1986 United States Senate election in Idaho took place on November 4, 1986, alongside other elections to the United States Senate in other states as well as elections to the United States House of Representatives and various state and local elections. Incumbent Republican U.S. Senator Steve Symms narrowly won re-election to a second term. As of 2026, this is the last time that a U.S. Senate race in Idaho was decided by a single-digit margin. This was the first time since 1926 that an incumbent Republican Senator was re-elected to this seat.

== Candidates ==
=== Democratic ===
- John V. Evans, Governor

=== Republican ===
- Steve Symms, incumbent U.S. Senator

== Results ==
General election results
Party	Candidate	Votes	%	±%
Republican	Steve Symms (incumbent)	196,958	51.56%	+1.81%
Democratic	John V. Evans	185,066	48.44%	−0.33%
Majority		11,892	3.11%	+2.14%
Turnout		382,024		−13.11%
Republican hold				

== See also ==
- 1986 United States Senate elections
