= John Evans (Idaho politician) =

American politician

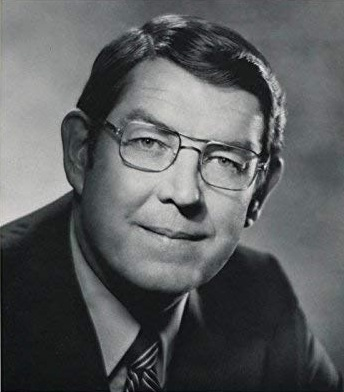

27th Governor of Idaho
- In office January 23, 1977 – January 4, 1987
- Lieutenant: William Murphy; Phil Batt; David Leroy
- Preceded by: Cecil Andrus
- Succeeded by: Cecil Andrus

33rd Lieutenant Governor of Idaho
- In office January 6, 1975 – January 23, 1977
- Governor: Cecil Andrus
- Preceded by: Jack Murphy
- Succeeded by: William Murphy

Member of the Idaho Senate
- In office 1953–1959; 1969-1975

Personal details
- Born: John Victor Evans; January 18, 1925 Malad City, Idaho, U.S.
- Died: July 8, 2014 (aged 89) Boise, Idaho, U.S.
- Resting place: Malad City Cemetery; Malad City, Idaho, U.S.
- Party: Democratic
- Spouse: Lola Daniels (m. 1945)
- Children: 5
- Education: Stanford University (BA)

Military service
- Allegiance: United States
- Branch/service: United States Army
- Unit: Infantry
- Battles/wars: World War II

John Victor Evans Sr. (January 18, 1925 – July 8, 2014) was an American politician from Idaho. A member of the Democratic Party, he was the state's 27th governor and was in office for 10 years, from 1977 to 1987.

== Biography ==
Born in Malad, Idaho, Evans was an infantryman in the U.S. Army during World War II. Following the war, he attended Stanford University and graduated in 1951. He and his wife, Lola Daniels Evans (1927–2015), were married for over 69 years and had five children: three sons and two daughters.

== Career ==
Evans returned to Malad after college to help run the family wheat and cattle ranch. He was elected to the state senate at age 27 in 1952 and re-elected in 1954 and 1956, serving as majority leader in his final term. In 1960, Evans became mayor of Malad City and served in that capacity until 1966. He returned to the state senate in 1969 and served as minority leader from 1969 to 1975.

Evans was elected lieutenant governor in 1974, and became governor in January 1977 when Cecil Andrus accepted an appointment to become the Secretary of the Interior in the new Carter administration.

Evans finished Andrus' term and was elected governor in his own right in 1978, defeating Republican house speaker Allan Larsen of Blackfoot. As of 2023, Evans remains the only Mormon to have won election as governor in Idaho. Arnold Williams was the Mormon first to serve as governor (succeeding to the office following the resignation of Charles Gossett), holding office for slightly over a year starting in late 1945, but lost the 1946 election.

Evans was re-elected in 1982, narrowly defeating Republican lieutenant governor Phil Batt of Wilder in a contest so close on election night that at least one Idaho television network incorrectly declared Batt the winner.

After nearly a decade as a governor, Evans unsuccessfully ran for the U.S. Senate in 1986, but was defeated by Republican incumbent Steve Symms of Caldwell. He was succeeded as governor by Andrus, who served two more terms, giving the Democrats six consecutive elections for governor in the state, holding the office from 1971 to 1995.

While he was in office as governor in 1981, Evans's 29-year-old son John was the target of a foiled kidnapping attempt in Burley.

=== Elections ===
Idaho Gubernatorial Elections: Results 1978–1982
Year	Democrat	Votes	Pct	Republican	Votes	Pct	3rd Party	Votes	Pct
1978	John Evans (inc.)	165,540	58.7%	Allan Larsen	114,149	39.6%	Others	4,877	1.7%
1982	John Evans (inc.)	187,640	52.9%	Phil Batt	166,911	47.1%			

U.S. Senate elections in Idaho (Class III): Results 1986
Year	Democrat	Votes	Pct	Republican	Votes	Pct
1986	John Evans	185,066	48.4%	Steve Symms (inc.)	196,958	51.6%

== Later life and death ==
Evans became president of the family-owned D. L. Evans Bank in Burley in January 1987, which was founded in 1904 in Albion by his grandfather, David Lloyd Evans Sr. (1854–1929). Evans died at age 89 in 2014 at his Boise home on July 8. Less than a year later, Evans' widow, Lola, died at her Boise home on May 19, 2015, at the age of 88. They are interred at the Malad City Cemetery in Malad City.

Political offices
Preceded by Jack Murphy	Lieutenant Governor of Idaho; 1975–1977	Succeeded by William Murphy
Preceded by Cecil Andrus	Governor of Idaho; 1977–1987	Succeeded by Cecil Andrus
Party political offices
Preceded by Cecil Andrus	Democratic nominee for Governor of Idaho; 1978, 1982	Succeeded by Cecil Andrus
Preceded by Frank Church	Democratic nominee for Senator from Idaho (Class 3); 1986	Succeeded by Richard Stallings
