= Wilder, Idaho =

- City
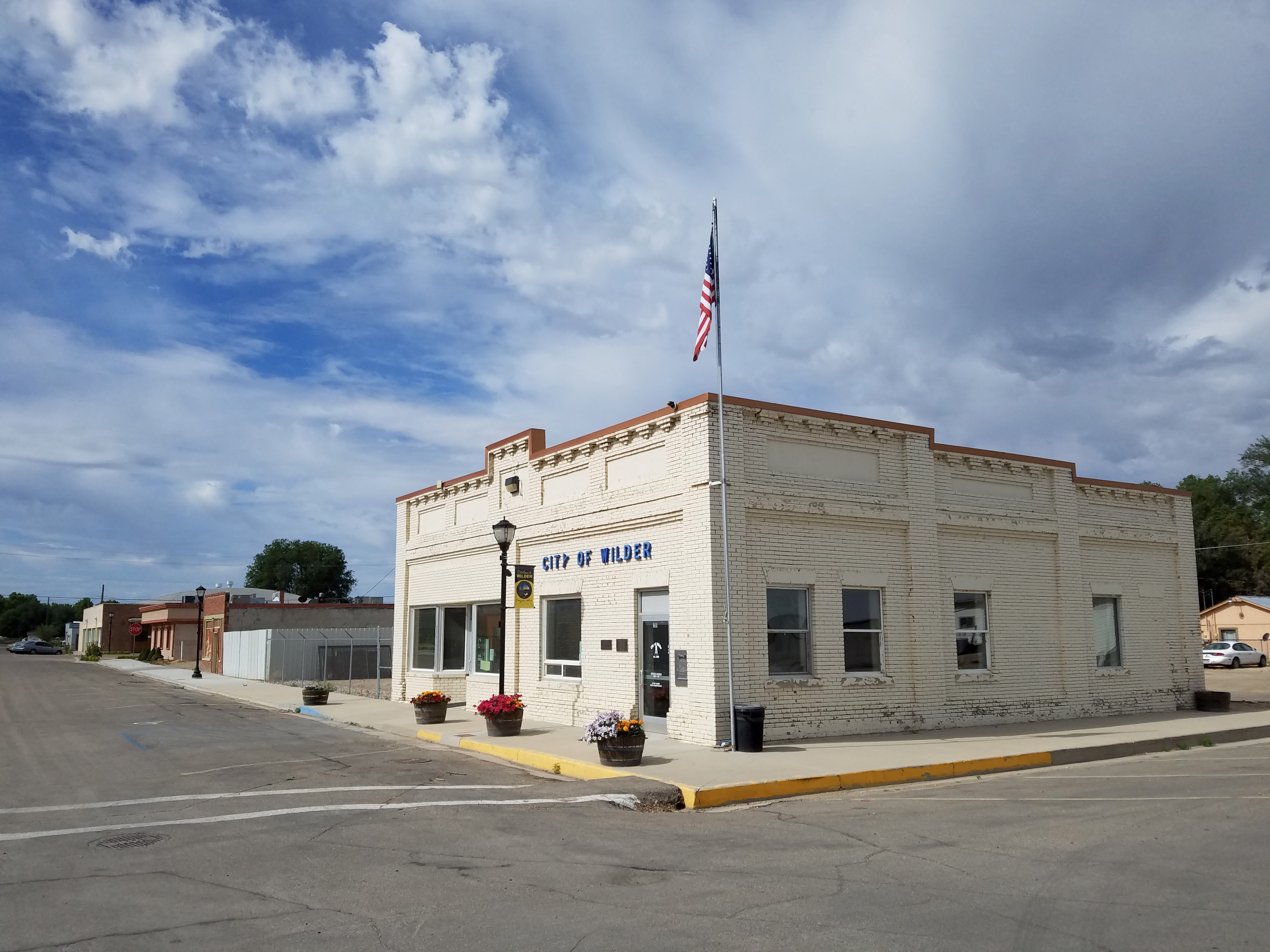
- Motto: "Golden Gate To The Treasure Valley"
- Location of Wilder in Canyon County, Idaho.
- Coordinates: 43°40′41″N 116°54′26″W
- Country: United States
- State: Idaho
- County: Canyon

Area
  - Total: 0.73 sq mi (1.88 km^{2})
  - Land: 0.71 sq mi (1.85 km^{2})
  - Water: 0.012 sq mi (0.03 km^{2})
- Elevation: 2,425 ft (739 m)

Population (2020)
  - Total: 1,597
  - Density: 2,240/sq mi (863/km^{2})
- Time zone: UTC-7 (Mountain (MST))
  - Summer (DST): UTC-6 (MDT)
- ZIP code: 83676
- Area code: 208
- FIPS code: 16-87670
- GNIS feature ID: 2412263
- Website: cityofwilder.org

Historical population
Census	Pop.	Note	%±
1920	349		—
1930	381		9.2%
1940	507		33.1%
1950	555		9.5%
1960	603		8.6%
1970	564		−6.5%
1980	1,260		123.4%
1990	1,232		−2.2%
2000	1,462		18.7%
2010	1,533		4.9%
2020	1,597		4.2%
U.S. Decennial Census

Wilder is a city in Canyon County, Idaho, United States. The population was 1,597 at the 2020 census.

Wilder is part of the Boise City–Nampa, Idaho Metropolitan Statistical Area.

== History ==
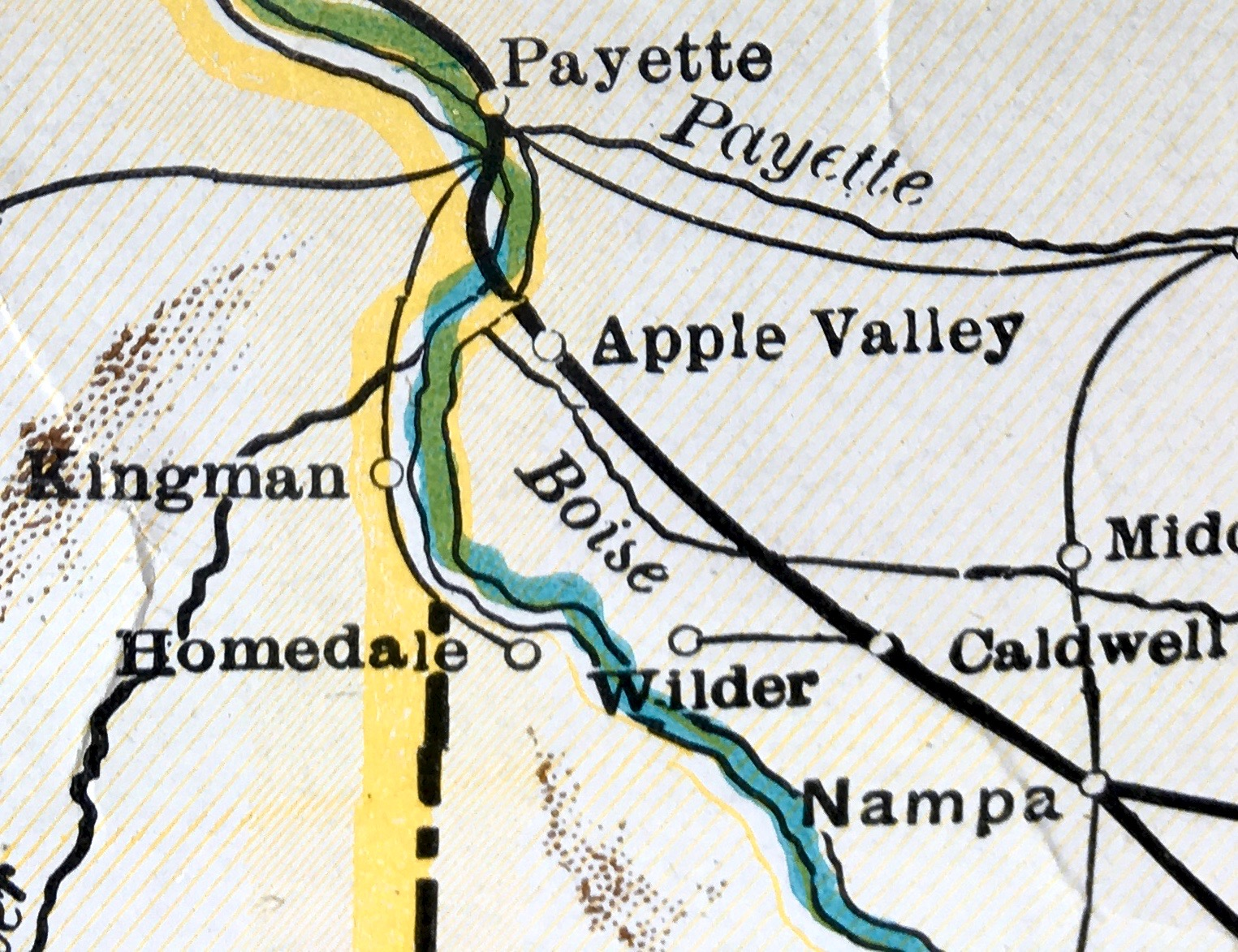
Terminus of branch railway line; route in 1930

Wilder was established in 1919, and was named for Marshall P. Wilder, a magazine editor.

An immigration raid at a race track at La Catedral Arena, west of Wilder, occurred on October 19, 2025. Anna Griffin of The New York Times stated that this "shattered Wilder’s innocent belief that its out-of-the-way location and deep-red politics could isolate the town from the raids overtaking other parts of the country."

== Geography ==
According to the United States Census Bureau, the city has a total area of 0.74 square miles (1.92 km^{2}), of which, 0.73 square miles (1.89 km^{2}) is land and 0.01 square miles (0.03 km^{2}) is water.

== Demographics ==
=== 2020 census ===
As of the 2020 census, Wilder had a population of 1,597. The median age was 30.1 years. 31.1% of residents were under the age of 18 and 11.5% of residents were 65 years of age or older. For every 100 females, there were 102.4 males, and for every 100 females age 18 and over, there were 101.8 males age 18 and over.

0.0% of residents lived in urban areas, while 100.0% lived in rural areas.

There were 503 households in Wilder, of which 46.7% had children under the age of 18 living in them. Of all households, 50.5% were married-couple households, 19.7% were households with a male householder and no spouse or partner present, and 22.1% were households with a female householder and no spouse or partner present. About 18.6% of all households were made up of individuals and 6.0% had someone living alone who was 65 years of age or older.

There were 553 housing units, of which 9.0% were vacant. The homeowner vacancy rate was 0.7% and the rental vacancy rate was 12.8%.

Racial composition as of the 2020 census
Race	Number	Percent
White	623	39.0%
Black or African American	3	0.2%
American Indian and Alaska Native	21	1.3%
Asian	5	0.3%
Native Hawaiian and Other Pacific Islander	8	0.5%
Some other race	523	32.7%
Two or more races	414	25.9%
Hispanic or Latino (of any race)	1,058	66.2%

=== 2010 census ===
At the 2010 census there were 1,533 people, 453 households, and 353 families living in the city. The population density was 2,100.0 inhabitants per square mile (810.8/km^{2}). There were 501 housing units at an average density of 686.3 per square mile (265.0/km^{2}). The racial makeup of the city was 44.6% White, 0.2% African American, 1.8% Native American, 0.4% Asian, 51.1% from other races, and 1.9% from two or more races. Hispanic or Latino of any race were 75.9%.

Of the 453 households 52.5% had children under the age of 18 living with them, 54.1% were married couples living together, 16.8% had a female householder with no husband present, 7.1% had a male householder with no wife present, and 22.1% were non-families. 18.8% of households were one person and 7.2% were one person aged 65 or older. The average household size was 3.38 and the average family size was 3.89.

The median age was 27 years. 37.6% of residents were under the age of 18; 9.4% were between the ages of 18 and 24; 25.6% were from 25 to 44; 18.2% were from 45 to 64; and 9.1% were 65 or older. The gender makeup of the city was 48.7% male and 51.3% female.

=== 2000 census ===
At the 2000 census there were 1,462 people, 389 households, and 315 families living in the city. The population density was 3,885.7 inhabitants per square mile (1,500.3/km^{2}). There were 421 housing units at an average density of 1,118.9 per square mile (432.0/km^{2}). The racial makeup of the city was 33.99% White, 0.21% African American, 0.14% Native American, 0.27% Asian, 0.07% Pacific Islander, 62.93% from other races, and 2.39% from two or more races. Hispanic or Latino of any race were 76.40%.

Of the 389 households 52.2% had children under the age of 18 living with them, 65.6% were married couples living together, 9.8% had a female householder with no husband present, and 19.0% were non-families. 17.2% of households were one person and 10.5% were one person aged 65 or older. The average household size was 3.76 and the average family size was 4.30.

The age distribution was 39.2% under the age of 18, 13.3% from 18 to 24, 25.2% from 25 to 44, 15.1% from 45 to 64, and 7.2% 65 or older. The median age was 24 years. For every 100 females, there were 99.7 males. For every 100 females age 18 and over, there were 100.7 males.

The median household income was $21,731 and the median family income was $25,625. Males had a median income of $22,188 versus $16,250 for females. The per capita income for the city was $7,601. About 27.7% of families and 31.6% of the population were below the poverty line, including 37.4% of those under age 18 and 26.3% of those age 65 or over.

== Economy ==
Wilder has a meat processing plant, SSI, manufacturing frozen individual serving hamburgers and french fries. Wilder is primarily an agricultural community, with onions, hops, seed corn, beans and alfalfa seed among the major crops.

== Education ==
Wilder is in the Wilder School District 133.

Residents of Canyon County are in the area (and the taxation zone) for College of Western Idaho.

== Politics ==
In the 2024 United States presidential election, 91% of the people in the political precinct that includes the municipality selected Donald Trump.

== Notable people ==
- Phil Batt, 29th governor of Idaho
