= Political party strength in Idaho =

Politics in the US state of Idaho

The following table indicates the parties of elected officials in the U.S. state of Idaho:

- Governor
- Lieutenant Governor
- Secretary of State
- Attorney General
- State Auditor/State Controller (Note: Office renamed per 1994 amendment to state Constitution.)
- State Treasurer
- Superintendent of Public Instruction
- Inspector of Mines (before 1974)

The table also indicates the historical party composition in the:

- State Senate
- State House of Representatives
- State delegation to the United States Senate
- State delegation to the United States House of Representatives

For years in which a presidential election was held, the table indicates which party's nominees received the state's electoral votes.

The parties are as follows: Democratic (D), Democratic–Populist fusion (D/P), Democratic–Populist–Silver Republican fusion (D/P/SR), Democratic–Silver Republican fusion (D/SR), Independent (I), Populist (P), Republican (R), Socialist (S), Silver Republican (SR), and a tie or coalition within a group of elected officials.

== 1863–1890 ==
Year	Executive offices						Territorial Council		U.S. Congress
Year	Governor	Sec. of State	Atty. Gen.	Auditor	Treasurer	Supt. of Pub. Inst.	Senate	House	Territorial delegate
1863	William H. Wallace (R) (Note: Territorial governor appointed by the President of the United States.)	William B. Daniels (Note: Secretary of Idaho Territory.)	no such office	John M. Bacon	Derrick S. Kenyon	no such office	no such offices		no such office
1864	Caleb Lyon (R)	C. DeWitt Smith	no such office	Benjamin F. Lamkin	Ephraim Smith	J. R. Chittenden	D maj.	D maj.	William H. Wallace (R) (Note: Delegate to the U.S. House of Representatives from the Idaho Territory.)
1865	Caleb Lyon (R)	Horace G. Gilson	no such office	Benjamin F. Lamkin	Ephraim Smith	J. R. Chittenden	D maj.	D maj.	Edward D. Holbrook (D)
1866	David W. Ballard (R)	S. R. Howlett	no such office	Benjamin F. Lamkin	Ephraim Smith	W. R. Bishop	D maj.	D maj.	Edward D. Holbrook (D)
1867	David W. Ballard (R)	S. R. Howlett	no such office	Horace B. Lane	Edward C. Sterling	W. R. Bishop	D maj.	D maj.	Jacob K. Shafer (D)
1867	David W. Ballard (R)	S. R. Howlett	no such office	William R. Bishop	Edward C. Sterling	W. R. Bishop	D maj.	D maj.	Jacob K. Shafer (D)
1868	David W. Ballard (R)	S. R. Howlett	no such office	Daniel Cram	Edward C. Sterling	W. R. Bishop	D maj.	D maj.	Jacob K. Shafer (D)
1869	David W. Ballard (R)	Edward J. Curtis	no such office	Daniel Cram	Edward C. Sterling	W. R. Bishop	D maj.	D maj.	Jacob K. Shafer (D)
1870	Samuel Bard	Edward J. Curtis	no such office	Daniel Cram	Edward C. Sterling	W. R. Bishop	D maj.	D maj.	Jacob K. Shafer (D)
1870	Gilman Marston (R)	Edward J. Curtis	no such office	Daniel Cram	Edward C. Sterling	W. R. Bishop	D maj.	D maj.	Jacob K. Shafer (D)
1871	Alexander H. Conner (R)	Edward J. Curtis	no such office	Daniel Cram	John S. Gray (R)	W. R. Bishop	D maj.	D maj.	Samuel A. Merritt (D)
1871	Thomas M. Bowen (R)	Edward J. Curtis	no such office	Daniel Cram	John S. Gray (R)	W. R. Bishop	D maj.	D maj.	Samuel A. Merritt (D)
1871	Thomas W. Bennett (R)	Edward J. Curtis	no such office	Daniel Cram	John S. Gray (R)	W. R. Bishop	D maj.	D maj.	Samuel A. Merritt (D)
1872	Thomas W. Bennett (R)	Edward J. Curtis	no such office	Daniel Cram	John Huntoon	W. R. Bishop	D maj.	D maj.	Samuel A. Merritt (D)
1873	Thomas W. Bennett (R)	Edward J. Curtis	no such office	Daniel Cram	John Huntoon	W. R. Bishop	D maj.	D maj.	John Hailey (D)
1874	Thomas W. Bennett (R)	Edward J. Curtis	no such office	Daniel Cram	John Huntoon	W. R. Bishop	D maj.	D maj.	John Hailey (D)
1875	David P. Thompson (D)	Edward J. Curtis	no such office	Joseph Perrault	John Huntoon	W. R. Bishop	D maj.	D maj.	Thomas W. Bennett (I)
1876	Mason Brayman (R)	Edward J. Curtis	no such office	Joseph Perrault	John Huntoon	W. R. Bishop	D maj.	D maj.	Stephen S. Fenn (D)
1877	Mason Brayman (R)	Edward J. Curtis	no such office	Joseph Perrault	John Huntoon	W. R. Bishop	D maj.	D maj.	Stephen S. Fenn (D)
1878	John Philo Hoyt (R)	Robert A. Sidebotham	no such office	Joseph Perrault	John Huntoon	W. R. Bishop	D maj.	D maj.	Stephen S. Fenn (D)
1879	John Philo Hoyt (R)	Robert A. Sidebotham	no such office	Joseph Perrault	John Huntoon	W. R. Bishop	D maj.	D maj.	George Ainslie (D)
1880	John Baldwin Neil (R)	Theodore Frelinghuysen; Singiser (R)	no such office	Joseph Perrault	John Huntoon	W. R. Bishop	D maj.	D maj.	George Ainslie (D)
1881	John Baldwin Neil (R)	Theodore Frelinghuysen; Singiser (R)	no such office	James L. Onderdonk	John Huntoon	W. R. Bishop	[?]	[?]	George Ainslie (D)
1882	John Baldwin Neil (R)	Theodore Frelinghuysen; Singiser (R)	no such office	James L. Onderdonk	John Huntoon	W. R. Bishop	[?]	[?]	George Ainslie (D)
1883	John N. Irwin (R)	Edward L. Curtis	no such office	James L. Onderdonk	John Huntoon	W. R. Bishop	[?]	[?]	Theodore Felinghuysen; Singiser (R)
1884	William M. Bunn (R)	David P. B. Pride	no such office	James L. Onderdonk	John Huntoon	W. R. Bishop	[?]	[?]	Theodore Felinghuysen; Singiser (R)
1885	Edward A. Stevenson (D)	Edward J. Curtis	David P. B. Pride	Silas W. Moody	Joseph Perrault	W. R. Bishop	[?]	[?]	John Hailey (D)
1886	Edward A. Stevenson (D)	Edward J. Curtis	David P. B. Pride	Silas W. Moody	Joseph Perrault	W. R. Bishop	[?]	[?]	John Hailey (D)
1887	Edward A. Stevenson (D)	Edward J. Curtis	Richard Z. Johnson	J. H. Wickersham	Charlies Himrod	Silas W. Moody	[?]	[?]	Fred Dubois (R)
1888	Edward A. Stevenson (D)	Edward J. Curtis	Richard Z. Johnson	J. H. Wickersham	Charlies Himrod	Silas W. Moody	[?]	[?]	Fred Dubois (R)
1889	George L. Shoup (R)	Edward J. Curtis	Richard Z. Johnson	J. H. Wickersham	Charlies Himrod	Charles C. Stevenson	[?]	[?]	Fred Dubois (R)
1890	George L. Shoup (R)	Edward J. Curtis	Richard Z. Johnson	J. H. Wickersham	Charlies Himrod	Charles C. Stevenson	[?]	[?]	Fred Dubois (R)

== 1890–1974 ==
Year	Executive offices								State Legislature		United States Congress				Electoral votes
Year	Governor	Lt. Gov.	Sec. of State	Atty. Gen.	Auditor/ Controller	Treasurer	Supt. of Pub. Inst.	Insp. Mines	State Senate	State House	U.S. Senator (Class II)	U.S. Senator (Class III)	U.S. House District 1	U.S. House District 2	Electoral votes
1890	George L. Shoup (R) (Note: Resigned to take an elected seat in the United States Senate.)	N. B. Willey (R)	A. J. Pinkham (R)	George H. Roberts (R)	Silas W. Moody (R)	Frank R. Coffin (R)	Joseph Harroun (R)	no such office	14R, 4D	31R, 5D	vacant	William J. McConnell (R)	Willis Sweet (R)		
1891	N. B. Willey (R) (Note: As lieutenant governor, acted as governor for unexpired term.)	John S. Gray (R)	A. J. Pinkham (R)	George H. Roberts (R)	Silas W. Moody (R)	Frank R. Coffin (R)	Joseph Harroun (R)	no such office	14R, 4D	31R, 5D	George L. Shoup (R)	Fred Dubois (R)	Willis Sweet (R)		
1892	N. B. Willey (R)	John S. Gray (R)	A. J. Pinkham (R)	George H. Roberts (R)	Silas W. Moody (R)	Frank R. Coffin (R)	Joseph Harroun (R)	no such office	14R, 4D	31R, 5D	George L. Shoup (R)	Fred Dubois (R)	Willis Sweet (R)		Weaver/ Field (Pop) ✗
1893	William J. McConnell (R)	F. B. Willis (R)	J. F. Curtis (R)	George M. Parsons (R)	Frank C. Ramsey (R)	W. C. Hill (R)	B. B. Lower (R)	William S. Haskins	8D, 6R, 4Pop (Note: A Democrat, Alexander Mayhew, was chosen as President Pro Tempore and a coalition of Democrats and Populists and organized the chamber.)	20R, 9D, 7Pop	George L. Shoup (R)	Fred Dubois (R)	Willis Sweet (R)		Weaver/ Field (Pop) ✗
1894	William J. McConnell (R)	F. B. Willis (R)	J. F. Curtis (R)	George M. Parsons (R)	Frank C. Ramsey (R)	W. C. Hill (R)	B. B. Lower (R)	William S. Haskins	8D, 6R, 4Pop	20R, 9D, 7Pop	George L. Shoup (R)	Fred Dubois (R)	Willis Sweet (R)		Weaver/ Field (Pop) ✗
1895	William J. McConnell (R)	F. J. Mills (R)	I. W. Garrett (R)	George M. Parsons (R)	Frank C. Ramsey (R)	Charles Bunting (R)	C. A. Foresman (R)	E. H. Dewey (R)	10R, 5Pop, 2D, 1I	25R, 8Pop, 1D, 1I	George L. Shoup (R)	Fred Dubois (R)	Edgar Wilson (R)		Weaver/ Field (Pop) ✗
1896	William J. McConnell (R)	F. J. Mills (R)	I. W. Garrett (R)	George M. Parsons (R)	Frank C. Ramsey (R)	Charles Bunting (R)	C. A. Foresman (R)	E. H. Dewey (R)	10R, 5Pop, 2D, 1I	25R, 8Pop, 1D, 1I	George L. Shoup (R)	Fred Dubois (SvR)	Edgar Wilson (R)		Bryan/ Sewall (D/SvR) ✗
1897	Frank Steunenberg (D/Pop)	George F. Moore (D/Pop)	George Lewis (D/Pop)	Robert E. McFarland (D/Pop)	James H. Anderson (D/Pop)	George H. Storer (D/Pop)	Louis Anderson (D/Pop)	Benjamin Hastings (D/Pop)	7D, 7Pop, 7R (Note: A coalition of Democrats and Populists elected a Populist, Joseph C. Rich, as President Pro Tempore and organized the chamber.)	17R, 16Pop, 15D (Note: A coalition of Democrats and Populists elected a Democrat, David L. Evans, as Speaker and organized the chamber.)	George L. Shoup (R)	Henry Heitfeld (D/Pop)	James Gunn (Pop)		Bryan/ Sewall (D/SvR) ✗
1898	Frank Steunenberg (D/Pop)	George F. Moore (D/Pop)	George Lewis (D/Pop)	Robert E. McFarland (D/Pop)	James H. Anderson (D/Pop)	George H. Storer (D/Pop)	Louis Anderson (D/Pop)	Benjamin Hastings (D/Pop)	7D, 7Pop, 7R	17R, 16Pop, 15D	George L. Shoup (R)	Henry Heitfeld (D/Pop)	James Gunn (Pop)		Bryan/ Sewall (D/SvR) ✗
1899	Frank Steunenberg (D/Pop)	J. H. Hutchinson (D/SvR)	M. A. Patrie (R)	S. H. Hays (D)	Bartlett Sinclair (D)	L. C. Rice (D/Pop/SvR)	Permeal J. French (D)	Jay A. Czizek (D/SvR)	9R, 7D/Pop/SvR, 3D, 2P (Note: A coalition of Republicans and Populists elected a Republican, Frank R. Gooding, as President Pro Tempore, and organized the chamber.)	17D/Pop/SvR, 14D, 12R, 6Pop (Note: A coalition of Democrats, Populists, and Silver Republicans elected a Democrat, David L. Evans, as Speaker and organized the chamber.)	George L. Shoup (R)	Henry Heitfeld (D/Pop)	Edgar Wilson (SvR)		Bryan/ Sewall (D/SvR) ✗
1900	Frank Steunenberg (D/Pop)	J. H. Hutchinson (D/SvR)	M. A. Patrie (R)	S. H. Hays (D)	Bartlett Sinclair (D)	L. C. Rice (D/Pop/SvR)	Permeal J. French (D)	Jay A. Czizek (D/SvR)	9R, 7D/Pop/SvR, 3D, 2P	17D/Pop/SvR, 14D, 12R, 6Pop	George L. Shoup (R)	Henry Heitfeld (D/Pop)	Edgar Wilson (SvR)		Bryan/ Stevenson (D) ✗
1901	Frank W. Hunt (D)	Thomas F. Terrell (D)	Charles Bassett (D/SvR)	Frank Martin (D)	E. W. Jones (D/SvR)	J. J. Plummer (D)	Permeal J. French (D)	Martin Jacobs (D/Pop/SvR)	10D, 7R, 3Pop, 1SvR (Note: A coalition of Democrats, Populists, and Silver Republicans elected a Populist, J.W. Ballantine, as President Pro Tempore and organized the chamber.)	20R, 16D, 7SvR, 6Pop (Note: A coalition of Democrats, Populists, and Silver Republicans elected a Democrat, Glenn P. McKinley, as Speaker and organized the chamber.)	Fred Dubois (SvR)	Henry Heitfeld (D/Pop)	Thomas L. Glenn (Pop)		Bryan/ Stevenson (D) ✗
1902	Frank W. Hunt (D)	Thomas F. Terrell (D)	Charles Bassett (D/SvR)	Frank Martin (D)	E. W. Jones (D/SvR)	J. J. Plummer (D)	Permeal J. French (D)	Martin Jacobs (D/Pop/SvR)	10D, 7R, 3Pop, 1SvR	20R, 16D, 7SvR, 6Pop	Fred Dubois (D)	Henry Heitfeld (D/Pop)	Thomas L. Glenn (Pop)		Bryan/ Stevenson (D) ✗
1903	John T. Morrison (R)	James M. Stevens (R)	Will H. Gibson (R)	John A. Bagley (R)	Theo Turner (R)	Henry C. Coffin (R)	May L. Scott (R)	Robert N. Bell (R)	14R, 6D, 1I	36R, 13D	Fred Dubois (D)	Weldon B. Heyburn (R)	Burton L. French (R)		Bryan/ Stevenson (D) ✗
1904	John T. Morrison (R)	James M. Stevens (R)	Will H. Gibson (R)	John A. Bagley (R)	Theo Turner (R)	Henry C. Coffin (R)	May L. Scott (R)	Robert N. Bell (R)	14R, 6D, 1I	36R, 13D	Fred Dubois (D)	Weldon B. Heyburn (R)	Burton L. French (R)		Roosevelt/ Fairbanks (R) ✓
1905	Frank R. Gooding (R)	Burpee L. Steeves (R)	Will H. Gibson (R)	John Guheen (R)	Robert S. Bragaw (R)	Henry C. Coffin (R)	May L. Scott (R)	Robert N. Bell (R)	19R, 2D	48R, 2D	Fred Dubois (D)	Weldon B. Heyburn (R)	Burton L. French (R)		Roosevelt/ Fairbanks (R) ✓
1906	Frank R. Gooding (R)	Burpee L. Steeves (R)	Will H. Gibson (R)	John Guheen (R)	Robert S. Bragaw (R)	Henry C. Coffin (R)	May L. Scott (R)	Robert N. Bell (R)	19R, 2D	48R, 2D	Fred Dubois (D)	Weldon B. Heyburn (R)	Burton L. French (R)		Roosevelt/ Fairbanks (R) ✓
1907	Frank R. Gooding (R)	Ezra A. Burrell (R)	Robert Lansdon (R)	John Guheen (R)	Robert S. Bragaw (R)	C. A. Hastings (R)	S. Belle Chamberlain (R)	Robert N. Bell (R)	15R, 6D	38R, 12D, 1I	William Borah (R) (Note: Died in office.)	Weldon B. Heyburn (R)	Burton L. French (R)		Roosevelt/ Fairbanks (R) ✓
1908	Frank R. Gooding (R)	Ezra A. Burrell (R)	Robert Lansdon (R)	John Guheen (R)	Robert S. Bragaw (R)	C. A. Hastings (R)	S. Belle Chamberlain (R)	Robert N. Bell (R)	15R, 6D	38R, 12D, 1I	William Borah (R)	Weldon B. Heyburn (R)	Burton L. French (R)		Taft/ Sherman (R) ✓
1909	James H. Brady (R)	Lewis H. Sweetser (R)	Robert Lansdon (R)	D. C. McDougall (R)	S. D. Taylor (R)	C. A. Hastings (R)	S. Belle Chamberlain (R)	F. Cushing Moore (R)	13R, 10D	44R, 9D	William Borah (R)	Weldon B. Heyburn (R)	Thomas R. Hamer (R)		Taft/ Sherman (R) ✓
1910	James H. Brady (R)	Lewis H. Sweetser (R)	Robert Lansdon (R)	D. C. McDougall (R)	S. D. Taylor (R)	C. A. Hastings (R)	S. Belle Chamberlain (R)	F. Cushing Moore (R)	13R, 10D	44R, 9D	William Borah (R)	Weldon B. Heyburn (R)	Thomas R. Hamer (R)		Taft/ Sherman (R) ✓
1911	James H. Hawley (D)	Lewis H. Sweetser (R)	Wilford L. Gifford (R)	D. C. McDougall (R)	S. D. Taylor (R)	O. V. Allen (R) (Note: Resigned.)	Grace M. Shepherd (R)	Robert N. Bell (R)	14R, 9D	34R, 25D	William Borah (R)	Weldon B. Heyburn (R)	Burton L. French (R)		Taft/ Sherman (R) ✓
1912	James H. Hawley (D)	Lewis H. Sweetser (R)	Wilford L. Gifford (R)	D. C. McDougall (R)	S. D. Taylor (R)	O. V. Allen (R)	Grace M. Shepherd (R)	Robert N. Bell (R)	14R, 9D	34R, 25D	William Borah (R)	Kirtland I. Perky (D)	Burton L. French (R)		Wilson/ Marshall (D) ✓
1913	John M. Haines (R)	Herman H. Taylor (R)	Wilford L. Gifford (R)	Joseph H. Peterson (R)	Fred L. Huston (R)	O. V. Allen (R)	Grace M. Shepherd (R)	Robert N. Bell (R)	21R, 3D	56R, 4D	William Borah (R)	James H. Brady (R)	Burton L. French (R) (Note: Elected at-large on a general ticket.)	Addison T. Smith (R)	Wilson/ Marshall (D) ✓
1914	John M. Haines (R)	Herman H. Taylor (R)	Wilford L. Gifford (R)	Joseph H. Peterson (R)	Fred L. Huston (R)	E. H. Dewey (R) (Note: Appointed to fill a vacancy.)	Grace M. Shepherd (R)	Robert N. Bell (R)	21R, 3D	56R, 4D	William Borah (R)	James H. Brady (R)	Burton L. French (R)	Addison T. Smith (R)	Wilson/ Marshall (D) ✓
1915	Moses Alexander (D)	Herman H. Taylor (R)	George R. Barker (R)	Joseph H. Peterson (R)	Fred L. Huston (R)	John W. Eagleson (R)	Bernice McCoy (R)	Robert N. Bell (R)	19R, 11D, 2Prog, 1Soc	32R, 28D, 1Prog	William Borah (R)	James H. Brady (R)	Robert M. McCracken (R)	Addison T. Smith (R)	Wilson/ Marshall (D) ✓
1916	Moses Alexander (D)	Herman H. Taylor (R)	George R. Barker (R)	Joseph H. Peterson (R)	Fred L. Huston (R)	John W. Eagleson (R)	Bernice McCoy (R)	Robert N. Bell (R)	19R, 11D, 2Prog, 1Soc	32R, 28D, 1Prog	William Borah (R)	James H. Brady (R)	Robert M. McCracken (R)	Addison T. Smith (R)	Wilson/ Marshall (D) ✓
1917	Moses Alexander (D)	Ernest L. Parker (D)	William T. Dougherty (D)	T. A. Walters (D)	Clarence Van Deusen (D)	John W. Eagleson (R)	Ethel E. Redfield (R)	Robert N. Bell (R)	21D, 16R	36D, 29R	William Borah (R)	James H. Brady (R)	Burton L. French (R)	Addison T. Smith (R)	Wilson/ Marshall (D) ✓
1918	Moses Alexander (D)	Ernest L. Parker (D)	William T. Dougherty (D)	T. A. Walters (D)	Clarence Van Deusen (D)	John W. Eagleson (R)	Ethel E. Redfield (R)	Robert N. Bell (R)	21D, 16R	36D, 29R	William Borah (R)	John F. Nugent (D)	Burton L. French (R)	Addison T. Smith (R)	Wilson/ Marshall (D) ✓
1919	D. W. Davis (R)	Charles C. Moore (R)	Robert O. Jones (R)	Roy L. Black (R)	Edward G. Gallett (R)	John W. Eagleson (R)	Ethel E. Redfield (R)	Robert N. Bell (R)	29R, 12D	46R, 18D	William Borah (R)	John F. Nugent (D)	Burton L. French (R)	Addison T. Smith (R)	Wilson/ Marshall (D) ✓
1920	D. W. Davis (R)	Charles C. Moore (R)	Robert O. Jones (R)	Roy L. Black (R)	Edward G. Gallett (R)	John W. Eagleson (R)	Ethel E. Redfield (R)	Robert N. Bell (R)	29R, 12D	46R, 18D	William Borah (R)	John F. Nugent (D)	Burton L. French (R)	Addison T. Smith (R)	Harding/ Coolidge (R) ✓
1921	D. W. Davis (R)	Charles C. Moore (R)	Robert O. Jones (R)	Roy L. Black (R)	Edward G. Gallett (R)	Daniel F. Banks (R)	Ethel E. Redfield (R)	Stewart Campbell (R)	39R, 5D	51R, 3D	William Borah (R)	Frank R. Gooding (R)	Burton L. French (R)	Addison T. Smith (R)	Harding/ Coolidge (R) ✓
1922	D. W. Davis (R)	Charles C. Moore (R)	Robert O. Jones (R)	Roy L. Black (R)	Edward G. Gallett (R)	Daniel F. Banks (R)	Ethel E. Redfield (R)	Stewart Campbell (R)	39R, 5D	51R, 3D	William Borah (R)	Frank R. Gooding (R)	Burton L. French (R)	Addison T. Smith (R)	Harding/ Coolidge (R) ✓
1923	Charles C. Moore (R)	H. C. Baldridge (R)	F. A. Jeter (R)	A. H. Conner (R)	Edward G. Gallett (R)	Daniel F. Banks (R)	Elizabeth Russum (R)	Stewart Campbell (R)	25R, 14D, 5Prog	37R, 22D, 6Prog	William Borah (R)	Frank R. Gooding (R)	Burton L. French (R)	Addison T. Smith (R)	Harding/ Coolidge (R) ✓
1924	Charles C. Moore (R)	H. C. Baldridge (R)	F. A. Jeter (R)	A. H. Conner (R)	Edward G. Gallett (R)	Daniel F. Banks (R)	Elizabeth Russum (R)	Stewart Campbell (R)	25R, 14D, 5Prog	37R, 22D, 6Prog	William Borah (R)	Frank R. Gooding (R)	Burton L. French (R)	Addison T. Smith (R)	Coolidge/ Dawes (R) ✓
1925	Charles C. Moore (R)	H. C. Baldridge (R)	F. A. Jeter (R)	A. H. Conner (R)	Edward G. Gallett (R)	Daniel F. Banks (R)	Elizabeth Russum (R)	Stewart Campbell (R)	32R, 7Prog, 5D	45R, 12Prog, 5D	William Borah (R)	Frank R. Gooding (R)	Burton L. French (R)	Addison T. Smith (R)	Coolidge/ Dawes (R) ✓
1926	Charles C. Moore (R)	H. C. Baldridge (R)	F. A. Jeter (R)	A. H. Conner (R)	Edward G. Gallett (R)	Daniel F. Banks (R)	Elizabeth Russum (R)	Stewart Campbell (R)	32R, 7Prog, 5D	45R, 12Prog, 5D	William Borah (R)	Frank R. Gooding (R)	Burton L. French (R)	Addison T. Smith (R)	Coolidge/ Dawes (R) ✓
1927	H. C. Baldridge (R)	Oscar Hailey (R)	Fred E. Lukens (R)	Frank L. Stephan (R)	Edward G. Gallett (R)	Byron Defenbach (R)	Mabelle McConnell Lyman (R)	Stewart Campbell (R)	29R, 11D, 4Prog	52R, 8Prog, 7D, 1I	William Borah (R)	Frank R. Gooding (R)	Burton L. French (R)	Addison T. Smith (R)	Coolidge/ Dawes (R) ✓
1928	H. C. Baldridge (R)	Oscar Hailey (R)	Fred E. Lukens (R)	Frank L. Stephan (R)	Edward G. Gallett (R)	Byron Defenbach (R)	Mabelle McConnell Lyman (R)	Stewart Campbell (R)	29R, 11D, 4Prog	52R, 8Prog, 7D, 1I	William Borah (R)	John Thomas (R)	Burton L. French (R)	Addison T. Smith (R)	Hoover/ Curtis (R) ✓
1929	H. C. Baldridge (R)	W. B. Kinne	Fred E. Lukens (R)	W. D. Gillis (R)	Edward G. Gallett (R)	Byron Defenbach (R)	Myrtle R. Davis (R)	Stewart Campbell (R)	32R, 12D	50R, 9D	William Borah (R)	John Thomas (R)	Burton L. French (R)	Addison T. Smith (R)	Hoover/ Curtis (R) ✓
1929	H. C. Baldridge (R)	Oscar Hailey (R)	Fred E. Lukens (R)	W. D. Gillis (R)	Edward G. Gallett (R)	Byron Defenbach (R)	Myrtle R. Davis (R)	Stewart Campbell (R)	32R, 12D	50R, 9D	William Borah (R)	John Thomas (R)	Burton L. French (R)	Addison T. Smith (R)	Hoover/ Curtis (R) ✓
1930	H. C. Baldridge (R)	Oscar Hailey (R)	Fred E. Lukens (R)	W. D. Gillis (R)	Edward G. Gallett (R)	Byron Defenbach (R)	Myrtle R. Davis (R)	Stewart Campbell (R)	32R, 12D	50R, 9D	William Borah (R)	John Thomas (R)	Burton L. French (R)	Addison T. Smith (R)	Hoover/ Curtis (R) ✓
1931	C. Ben Ross (D)	G. P. Mix (D)	Fred E. Lukens (R)	Fred J. Babcock (R)	Edward G. Gallett (R)	George Barrett (R)	Myrtle R. Davis (R)	Stewart Campbell (R)	23R, 21D	43R, 27D	William Borah (R)	John Thomas (R)	Burton L. French (R)	Addison T. Smith (R)	Hoover/ Curtis (R) ✓
1932	C. Ben Ross (D)	G. P. Mix (D)	Fred E. Lukens (R)	Fred J. Babcock (R)	Edward G. Gallett (R)	George Barrett (R)	Myrtle R. Davis (R)	Stewart Campbell (R)	23R, 21D	43R, 27D	William Borah (R)	John Thomas (R)	Burton L. French (R)	Addison T. Smith (R)	Roosevelt/ Garner (D) ✓
1933	C. Ben Ross (D)	George Hill (D)	Franklin Girard (D)	Bert H. Miller (D)	Harry C. Parsons (D)	Myrtle P. Enking (D)	John W. Condie (D)	W. H. Simons (D)	35D, 9R	59D, 4R	William Borah (R)	James P. Pope (D)	Compton I. White (D)	Thomas C. Coffin (D)	Roosevelt/ Garner (D) ✓
1934	C. Ben Ross (D)	George Hill (D)	Franklin Girard (D)	Bert H. Miller (D)	Harry C. Parsons (D)	Myrtle P. Enking (D)	John W. Condie (D)	W. H. Simons (D)	35D, 9R	59D, 4R	William Borah (R)	James P. Pope (D)	Compton I. White (D)	Thomas C. Coffin (D)	Roosevelt/ Garner (D) ✓
1935	C. Ben Ross (D)	G. P. Mix (D)	Franklin Girard (D)	Bert H. Miller (D)	Harry C. Parsons (D)	Myrtle P. Enking (D)	John W. Condie (D)	Arthur Campbell (D)	36D, 8R	53D, 6R	William Borah (R)	James P. Pope (D)	Compton I. White (D)	D. Worth Clark (D)	Roosevelt/ Garner (D) ✓
1936	C. Ben Ross (D)	G. P. Mix (D)	Franklin Girard (D)	Bert H. Miller (D)	Harry C. Parsons (D)	Myrtle P. Enking (D)	John W. Condie (D)	Arthur Campbell (D)	36D, 8R	53D, 6R	William Borah (R)	James P. Pope (D)	Compton I. White (D)	D. Worth Clark (D)	Roosevelt/ Garner (D) ✓
1937	Barzilla W. Clark (D)	Charles C. Gossett (D)	Ira H. Masters (D)	J. W. Taylor (D)	Harry C. Parsons (D)	Myrtle P. Enking (D)	John W. Condie (D)	Arthur Campbell (D)	33D, 11R	50D, 9R	William Borah (R)	James P. Pope (D)	Compton I. White (D)	D. Worth Clark (D)	Roosevelt/ Garner (D) ✓
1938	Barzilla W. Clark (D)	Charles C. Gossett (D)	Ira H. Masters (D)	J. W. Taylor (D)	Harry C. Parsons (D)	Myrtle P. Enking (D)	John W. Condie (D)	Arthur Campbell (D)	33D, 11R	50D, 9R	William Borah (R)	James P. Pope (D)	Compton I. White (D)	D. Worth Clark (D)	Roosevelt/ Garner (D) ✓
1939	C. A. Bottolfsen (R)	Donald S. Whitehead (R)	George H. Curtis (D)	J. W. Taylor (D)	Calvin E. Wright (D)	Myrtle P. Enking (D)	John W. Condie (D)	Arthur Campbell (D)	27R, 17D	39R, 20D	William Borah (R)	D. Worth Clark (D)	Compton I. White (D)	Henry Dworshak (R)	Roosevelt/ Garner (D) ✓
1940	C. A. Bottolfsen (R)	Donald S. Whitehead (R)	George H. Curtis (D)	J. W. Taylor (D)	Calvin E. Wright (D)	Myrtle P. Enking (D)	John W. Condie (D)	Arthur Campbell (D)	27R, 17D	39R, 20D	John Thomas (R)	D. Worth Clark (D)	Compton I. White (D)	Henry Dworshak (R)	Roosevelt/ Wallace (D) ✓
1941	Chase A. Clark (D)	Charles C. Gossett (D)	George H. Curtis (D)	Bert H. Miller (D)	Calvin E. Wright (D)	Myrtle P. Enking (D)	C. E. Roberts (D)	Arthur Campbell (D)	23D, 21R	38D, 21R	John Thomas (R)	D. Worth Clark (D)	Compton I. White (D)	Henry Dworshak (R)	Roosevelt/ Wallace (D) ✓
1942	Chase A. Clark (D)	Charles C. Gossett (D)	George H. Curtis (D)	Bert H. Miller (D)	Calvin E. Wright (D)	Myrtle P. Enking (D)	C. E. Roberts (D)	Arthur Campbell (D)	23D, 21R	38D, 21R	John Thomas (R)	D. Worth Clark (D)	Compton I. White (D)	Henry Dworshak (R)	Roosevelt/ Wallace (D) ✓
1943	C. A. Bottolfsen (R)	Edwin Nelson (R)	George H. Curtis (D)	Bert H. Miller (D)	Calvin E. Wright (D)	Myrtle P. Enking (D)	C. E. Roberts (D)	Arthur Campbell (D)	31R, 13D	32R, 27D	John Thomas (R)	D. Worth Clark (D)	Compton I. White (D)	Henry Dworshak (R)	Roosevelt/ Wallace (D) ✓
1944	C. A. Bottolfsen (R)	Edwin Nelson (R)	George H. Curtis (D)	Bert H. Miller (D)	Calvin E. Wright (D)	Myrtle P. Enking (D)	Acel H. Chatburn (R)	Arthur Campbell (D)	31R, 13D	32R, 27D	John Thomas (R)	D. Worth Clark (D)	Compton I. White (D)	Henry Dworshak (R)	Roosevelt/ Truman (D) ✓
1945	Charles C. Gossett (D) (Note: Resigned so that Lieutenant Governor Arnold Williams would succeed him and then appoint him to the United States Senate.)	Arnold Williams (D)	Ira H. Masters (D)	Frank Langley (D)	Ernest G. Hansen (D)	Ruth G. Moon (D)	G. C. Sullivan (D)	Arthur Campbell (D)	24R, 20D	30R, 29D	John Thomas (R)	Glen H. Taylor (D)	Compton I. White (D)	Henry Dworshak (R)	Roosevelt/ Truman (D) ✓
1945	Arnold Williams (D)	A. R. McCabe (D)	Ira H. Masters (D)	Frank Langley (D)	Ernest G. Hansen (D)	Ruth G. Moon (D)	G. C. Sullivan (D)	Arthur Campbell (D)	24R, 20D	30R, 29D	Charles C. Gossett (D)	Glen H. Taylor (D)	Compton I. White (D)	Henry Dworshak (R)	Roosevelt/ Truman (D) ✓
1946	Arnold Williams (D)	A. R. McCabe (D)	Ira H. Masters (D)	Frank Langley (D)	Ernest G. Hansen (D)	Ruth G. Moon (D)	G. C. Sullivan (D)	Arthur Campbell (D)	24R, 20D	30R, 29D	Henry Dworshak (R)	Glen H. Taylor (D)	Compton I. White (D)	Henry Dworshak (R)	Roosevelt/ Truman (D) ✓
1947	C. A. Robins (R)	Donald S. Whitehead (R)	Cy Price (R)	Robert Ailshie (R)	N. P. Nielson (R)	Lela D. Painter (R)	Alton B. Jones (R)	George A. McDowell (R)	31R, 13D	42R, 17D	Henry Dworshak (R)	Glen H. Taylor (D)	Abe Goff (R)	John C. Sanborn (R)	Roosevelt/ Truman (D) ✓
1947	C. A. Robins (R)	Donald S. Whitehead (R)	Cy Price (R)	Robert E. Smylie (R) (Note: Initially appointed to fill vacancy; later elected in his own right.)	N. P. Nielson (R)	Lela D. Painter (R)	Alton B. Jones (R)	George A. McDowell (R)	31R, 13D	42R, 17D	Henry Dworshak (R)	Glen H. Taylor (D)	Abe Goff (R)	John C. Sanborn (R)	Roosevelt/ Truman (D) ✓
1948	C. A. Robins (R)	Donald S. Whitehead (R)	Cy Price (R)	Robert E. Smylie (R)	N. P. Nielson (R)	Lela D. Painter (R)	Alton B. Jones (R)	George A. McDowell (R)	31R, 13D	42R, 17D	Henry Dworshak (R)	Glen H. Taylor (D)	Abe Goff (R)	John C. Sanborn (R)	Truman/ Barkley (D) ✓
1949	C. A. Robins (R)	Donald S. Whitehead (R)	Cy Price (R)	Robert E. Smylie (R)	N. P. Nielson (R)	Lela D. Painter (R)	Alton B. Jones (R)	George A. McDowell (R)	24D, 20R	35R, 24D	Bert H. Miller (D)	Glen H. Taylor (D)	Compton I. White (D)	John C. Sanborn (R)	Truman/ Barkley (D) ✓
1950	C. A. Robins (R)	Donald S. Whitehead (R)	Cy Price (R)	Robert E. Smylie (R)	N. P. Nielson (R)	Lela D. Painter (R)	Alton B. Jones (R)	George A. McDowell (R)	24D, 20R	35R, 24D	Henry Dworshak (R)	Glen H. Taylor (D)	Compton I. White (D)	John C. Sanborn (R)	Truman/ Barkley (D) ✓
1951	Len Jordan (R)	Edson Deal (R)	Ira H. Masters (D)	Robert E. Smylie (R)	N. P. Nielson (R)	Lela D. Painter (R)	Alton B. Jones (R)	George A. McDowell (R)	29R, 15D	36R, 23D	Henry Dworshak (R)	Herman Welker (R)	John Travers Wood (R)	Hamer H. Budge (R)	Truman/ Barkley (D) ✓
1952	Len Jordan (R)	Edson Deal (R)	Ira H. Masters (D)	Robert E. Smylie (R)	N. P. Nielson (R)	Margaret Gilbert (R)	Alton B. Jones (R)	George A. McDowell (R)	29R, 15D	36R, 23D	Henry Dworshak (R)	Herman Welker (R)	John Travers Wood (R)	Hamer H. Budge (R)	Eisenhower/ Nixon (R) ✓
1953	Len Jordan (R)	Edson Deal (R)	Ira H. Masters (D)	Robert E. Smylie (R)	N. P. Nielson (R)	Margaret Gilbert (R)	Alton B. Jones (R)	George A. McDowell (R)	33R, 11D	45R, 14D	Henry Dworshak (R)	Herman Welker (R)	Gracie Pfost (D)	Hamer H. Budge (R)	Eisenhower/ Nixon (R) ✓
1954	Len Jordan (R)	Edson Deal (R)	Ira H. Masters (D)	Robert E. Smylie (R)	N. P. Nielson (R)	Margaret Gilbert (R)	Alton B. Jones (R)	George A. McDowell (R)	33R, 11D	45R, 14D	Henry Dworshak (R)	Herman Welker (R)	Gracie Pfost (D)	Hamer H. Budge (R)	Eisenhower/ Nixon (R) ✓
1955	Robert E. Smylie (R)	J. Berkeley Larsen (R)	Ira H. Masters (D)	Graydon W. Smith (R)	N. P. Nielson (R)	Ruth G. Moon (D)	Alton B. Jones (R)	George A. McDowell (R)	24R, 20D	36R, 23D	Henry Dworshak (R)	Herman Welker (R)	Gracie Pfost (D)	Hamer H. Budge (R)	Eisenhower/ Nixon (R) ✓
1956	Robert E. Smylie (R)	J. Berkeley Larsen (R)	James H. Young (R)	Graydon W. Smith (R)	N. P. Nielson (R)	Ruth G. Moon (D)	Alton B. Jones (R)	George A. McDowell (R)	24R, 20D	36R, 23D	Henry Dworshak (R)	Herman Welker (R)	Gracie Pfost (D)	Hamer H. Budge (R)	Eisenhower/ Nixon (R) ✓
1957	Robert E. Smylie (R)	J. Berkeley Larsen (R)	James H. Young (R)	Graydon W. Smith (R)	Rulon A. Swensen (R)	Ruth G. Moon (D)	Alton B. Jones (R)	George A. McDowell (R)	25D, 19R	32R, 27D	Henry Dworshak (R)	Frank Church (D)	Gracie Pfost (D)	Hamer H. Budge (R)	Eisenhower/ Nixon (R) ✓
1958	Robert E. Smylie (R)	J. Berkeley Larsen (R)	James H. Young (R)	Graydon W. Smith (R)	Rulon A. Swensen (R)	Ruth G. Moon (D)	Alton B. Jones (R)	O. T. Hansen (R)	25D, 19R	32R, 27D	Henry Dworshak (R)	Frank Church (D)	Gracie Pfost (D)	Hamer H. Budge (R)	Eisenhower/ Nixon (R) ✓
1959	Robert E. Smylie (R)	William Drevlow (D)	Arnold Williams (D)	Frank L. Benson (D)	Joe R. Williams (D)	Rulon A. Swensen (R)	D. F. Engelking (D)	George D. Fletcher (D)	27D, 17R	35D, 24R	Henry Dworshak (R)	Frank Church (D)	Gracie Pfost (D)	Hamer H. Budge (R)	Eisenhower/ Nixon (R) ✓
1960	Robert E. Smylie (R)	William Drevlow (D)	Arnold Williams (D)	Frank L. Benson (D)	Joe R. Williams (D)	Rulon A. Swensen (R)	D. F. Engelking (D)	George D. Fletcher (D)	27D, 17R	35D, 24R	Henry Dworshak (R)	Frank Church (D)	Gracie Pfost (D)	Hamer H. Budge (R)	Nixon/ Lodge (R) ✗
1961	Robert E. Smylie (R)	William Drevlow (D)	Arnold Williams (D)	Frank L. Benson (D)	Joe R. Williams (D)	Rulon A. Swensen (R)	D. F. Engelking (D)	George D. Fletcher (D)	23R, 21D	31R, 28D	Henry Dworshak (R)	Frank Church (D)	Gracie Pfost (D)	Ralph Harding (D)	Nixon/ Lodge (R) ✗
1962	Robert E. Smylie (R)	William Drevlow (D)	Arnold Williams (D)	Frank L. Benson (D)	Joe R. Williams (D)	Rulon A. Swensen (R)	D. F. Engelking (D)	George D. Fletcher (D)	23R, 21D	31R, 28D	Len Jordan (R)	Frank Church (D)	Gracie Pfost (D)	Ralph Harding (D)	Nixon/ Lodge (R) ✗
1963	Robert E. Smylie (R)	William Drevlow (D)	Arnold Williams (D)	Allan Shepard (R)	Joe R. Williams (D)	Marjorie Ruth Moon (D)	D. F. Engelking (D)	O. T. Hansen	23R, 21D	34R, 29D	Len Jordan (R)	Frank Church (D)	Compton I. White Jr. (D)	Ralph Harding (D)	Nixon/ Lodge (R) ✗
1964	Robert E. Smylie (R)	William Drevlow (D)	Arnold Williams (D)	Allan Shepard (R)	Joe R. Williams (D)	Marjorie Ruth Moon (D)	D. F. Engelking (D)	O. T. Hansen	23R, 21D	34R, 29D	Len Jordan (R)	Frank Church (D)	Compton I. White Jr. (D)	Ralph Harding (D)	Johnson/ Humphrey (D) ✓
1965	Robert E. Smylie (R)	William Drevlow (D)	Arnold Williams (D)	Allan Shepard (R)	Joe R. Williams (D)	Marjorie Ruth Moon (D)	D. F. Engelking (D)	O. T. Hansen	25R, 19D	42R, 37D	Len Jordan (R)	Frank Church (D)	Compton I. White Jr. (D)	George V. Hansen (R)	Johnson/ Humphrey (D) ✓
1966	Robert E. Smylie (R)	William Drevlow (D)	Louis E. Clapp (D)	Allan Shepard (R)	Joe R. Williams (D)	Marjorie Ruth Moon (D)	D. F. Engelking (D)	O. T. Hansen	25R, 19D	42R, 37D	Len Jordan (R)	Frank Church (D)	Compton I. White Jr. (D)	George V. Hansen (R)	Johnson/ Humphrey (D) ✓
1967	Don Samuelson (R)	Jack M. Murphy (R)	Edson Deal (R)	Allan Shepard (R)	Joe R. Williams (D)	Marjorie Ruth Moon (D)	D. F. Engelking (D)	O. T. Hansen	22R, 13D	38R, 32D	Len Jordan (R)	Frank Church (D)	Jim McClure (R)	George V. Hansen (R)	Johnson/ Humphrey (D) ✓
1967	Don Samuelson (R)	Jack M. Murphy (R)	Pete Cenarrusa (R)	Allan Shepard (R)	Joe R. Williams (D)	Marjorie Ruth Moon (D)	D. F. Engelking (D)	O. T. Hansen	22R, 13D	38R, 32D	Len Jordan (R)	Frank Church (D)	Jim McClure (R)	George V. Hansen (R)	Johnson/ Humphrey (D) ✓
1968	Don Samuelson (R)	Jack M. Murphy (R)	Pete Cenarrusa (R)	Allan Shepard (R)	Joe R. Williams (D)	Marjorie Ruth Moon (D)	D. F. Engelking (D)	O. T. Hansen	22R, 13D	38R, 32D	Len Jordan (R)	Frank Church (D)	Jim McClure (R)	George V. Hansen (R)	Nixon/ Agnew (R) ✓
1969	Don Samuelson (R)	Jack M. Murphy (R)	Pete Cenarrusa (R)	Robert M. Robson (R)	Joe R. Williams (D)	Marjorie Ruth Moon (D)	D. F. Engelking (D)	O. T. Hansen	20R, 15D	38R, 32D	Len Jordan (R)	Frank Church (D)	Jim McClure (R)	Orval Hansen (R)	Nixon/ Agnew (R) ✓
1970	Don Samuelson (R)	Jack M. Murphy (R)	Pete Cenarrusa (R)	Robert M. Robson (R)	Joe R. Williams (D)	Marjorie Ruth Moon (D)	D. F. Engelking (D)	O. T. Hansen	20R, 15D	38R, 32D	Len Jordan (R)	Frank Church (D)	Jim McClure (R)	Orval Hansen (R)	Nixon/ Agnew (R) ✓
1971	Cecil Andrus (D)	Jack M. Murphy (R)	Pete Cenarrusa (R)	W. Anthony Park (D)	Joe R. Williams (D)	Marjorie Ruth Moon (D)	D. F. Engelking (D)	W. Carl Griner (Note: Inspector of Mines became appointed position effective January 1971.)	19R, 16D	41R, 29D	Len Jordan (R)	Frank Church (D)	Jim McClure (R)	Orval Hansen (R)	Nixon/ Agnew (R) ✓
1972	Cecil Andrus (D)	Jack M. Murphy (R)	Pete Cenarrusa (R)	W. Anthony Park (D)	Joe R. Williams (D)	Marjorie Ruth Moon (D)	D. F. Engelking (D)	W. Carl Griner	19R, 16D	41R, 29D	Len Jordan (R)	Frank Church (D)	Jim McClure (R)	Orval Hansen (R)	Nixon/ Agnew (R) ✓
1973	Cecil Andrus (D)	Jack M. Murphy (R)	Pete Cenarrusa (R)	W. Anthony Park (D)	Joe R. Williams (D)	Marjorie Ruth Moon (D)	D. F. Engelking (D)	W. Carl Griner	23R, 12D	51R, 19D	Jim McClure (R)	Frank Church (D)	Steve Symms (R)	Orval Hansen (R)	Nixon/ Agnew (R) ✓
1974	Cecil Andrus (D)	Jack M. Murphy (R)	Pete Cenarrusa (R)	W. Anthony Park (D)	Joe R. Williams (D)	Marjorie Ruth Moon (D)	D. F. Engelking (D)	office abolished (Note: Office abolished by state legislature, with duties delegated to the state Department of Labor and Industrial Services, effective July 1, 1974.)	23R, 12D	51R, 19D	Jim McClure (R)	Frank Church (D)	Steve Symms (R)	Orval Hansen (R)	Nixon/ Agnew (R) ✓

== 1975–present ==
Year	Executive offices							State Legislature		United States Congress				Electoral votes
Year	Governor	Lt. Governor	Sec. of State	Atty. Gen.	Auditor/ Controller	Treasurer	Supt. of Pub. Inst.	State Senate	State House	U.S. Senator (Class II)	U.S. Senator (Class III)	U.S. House District 1	U.S. House District 2	Electoral votes
1975	Cecil Andrus (D) (Note: Resigned to become United States Secretary of the Interior.)	John Evans (D)	Pete Cenarrusa (R)	Wayne Kidwell (R)	Joe R. Williams (D)	Marjorie Ruth Moon (D)	Roy F. Truby (D)	21R, 14D	43R, 27D	Jim McClure (R)	Frank Church (D)	Steve Symms (R)	George V. Hansen (R)	
1976	Cecil Andrus (D)	John Evans (D)	Pete Cenarrusa (R)	Wayne Kidwell (R)	Joe R. Williams (D)	Marjorie Ruth Moon (D)	Roy F. Truby (D)	21R, 14D	43R, 27D	Jim McClure (R)	Frank Church (D)	Steve Symms (R)	George V. Hansen (R)	Ford/ Dole (R) ✗
1977	Cecil Andrus (D)	John Evans (D)	Pete Cenarrusa (R)	Wayne Kidwell (R)	Joe R. Williams (D)	Marjorie Ruth Moon (D)	Roy F. Truby (D)	20R, 15D	48R, 22D	Jim McClure (R)	Frank Church (D)	Steve Symms (R)	George V. Hansen (R)	Ford/ Dole (R) ✗
1977	John Evans (D) (Note: As lieutenant governor, acted as governor for unexpired term, and was later elected in his own right.)	William J. Murphy (D)	Pete Cenarrusa (R)	Wayne Kidwell (R)	Joe R. Williams (D)	Marjorie Ruth Moon (D)	Roy F. Truby (D)	20R, 15D	48R, 22D	Jim McClure (R)	Frank Church (D)	Steve Symms (R)	George V. Hansen (R)	Ford/ Dole (R) ✗
1978	John Evans (D)	William J. Murphy (D)	Pete Cenarrusa (R)	Wayne Kidwell (R)	Joe R. Williams (D)	Marjorie Ruth Moon (D)	Roy F. Truby (D)	20R, 15D	48R, 22D	Jim McClure (R)	Frank Church (D)	Steve Symms (R)	George V. Hansen (R)	Ford/ Dole (R) ✗
1979	John Evans (D)	Phil Batt (R)	Pete Cenarrusa (R)	David Leroy (R)	Joe R. Williams (D)	Marjorie Ruth Moon (D)	Jerry L. Evans (R)	19R, 16D	50R, 20D	Jim McClure (R)	Frank Church (D)	Steve Symms (R)	George V. Hansen (R)	Ford/ Dole (R) ✗
1980	John Evans (D)	Phil Batt (R)	Pete Cenarrusa (R)	David Leroy (R)	Joe R. Williams (D)	Marjorie Ruth Moon (D)	Jerry L. Evans (R)	19R, 16D	50R, 20D	Jim McClure (R)	Frank Church (D)	Steve Symms (R)	George V. Hansen (R)	Reagan/ Bush (R) ✓
1981	John Evans (D)	Phil Batt (R)	Pete Cenarrusa (R)	David Leroy (R)	Joe R. Williams (D)	Marjorie Ruth Moon (D)	Jerry L. Evans (R)	23R, 12D	56R, 14D	Jim McClure (R)	Steve Symms (R)	Larry Craig (R)	George V. Hansen (R)	Reagan/ Bush (R) ✓
1982	John Evans (D)	Phil Batt (R)	Pete Cenarrusa (R)	David Leroy (R)	Joe R. Williams (D)	Marjorie Ruth Moon (D)	Jerry L. Evans (R)	23R, 12D	56R, 14D	Jim McClure (R)	Steve Symms (R)	Larry Craig (R)	George V. Hansen (R)	Reagan/ Bush (R) ✓
1983	John Evans (D)	David Leroy (R)	Pete Cenarrusa (R)	Jim Jones (R)	Joe R. Williams (D)	Marjorie Ruth Moon (D)	Jerry L. Evans (R)	21R, 14D	51R, 19D	Jim McClure (R)	Steve Symms (R)	Larry Craig (R)	George V. Hansen (R)	Reagan/ Bush (R) ✓
1984	John Evans (D)	David Leroy (R)	Pete Cenarrusa (R)	Jim Jones (R)	Joe R. Williams (D)	Marjorie Ruth Moon (D)	Jerry L. Evans (R)	21R, 14D	51R, 19D	Jim McClure (R)	Steve Symms (R)	Larry Craig (R)	George V. Hansen (R)	Reagan/ Bush (R) ✓
1985	John Evans (D)	David Leroy (R)	Pete Cenarrusa (R)	Jim Jones (R)	Joe R. Williams (D)	Marjorie Ruth Moon (D)	Jerry L. Evans (R)	28R, 14D	67R, 17D	Jim McClure (R)	Steve Symms (R)	Larry Craig (R)	Richard Stallings (D)	Reagan/ Bush (R) ✓
1986	John Evans (D)	David Leroy (R)	Pete Cenarrusa (R)	Jim Jones (R)	Joe R. Williams (D)	Marjorie Ruth Moon (D)	Jerry L. Evans (R)	28R, 14D	67R, 17D	Jim McClure (R)	Steve Symms (R)	Larry Craig (R)	Richard Stallings (D)	Reagan/ Bush (R) ✓
1987	Cecil Andrus (D)	Butch Otter (R) (Note: Resigned to take an elected seat in the United States House of Representatives.)	Pete Cenarrusa (R)	Jim Jones (R)	Joe R. Williams (D)	Lydia Justice-Edwards (R)	Jerry L. Evans (R)	26R, 16D	64R, 20D	Jim McClure (R)	Steve Symms (R)	Larry Craig (R)	Richard Stallings (D)	Reagan/ Bush (R) ✓
1988	Cecil Andrus (D)	Butch Otter (R)	Pete Cenarrusa (R)	Jim Jones (R)	Joe R. Williams (D)	Lydia Justice-Edwards (R)	Jerry L. Evans (R)	26R, 16D	64R, 20D	Jim McClure (R)	Steve Symms (R)	Larry Craig (R)	Richard Stallings (D)	Bush/ Quayle (R) ✓
1989	Cecil Andrus (D)	Butch Otter (R)	Pete Cenarrusa (R)	Jim Jones (R)	Joe R. Williams (D)	Lydia Justice-Edwards (R)	Jerry L. Evans (R)	23R, 19D	64R, 20D	Jim McClure (R)	Steve Symms (R)	Larry Craig (R)	Richard Stallings (D)	Bush/ Quayle (R) ✓
1989	Cecil Andrus (D)	Butch Otter (R)	Pete Cenarrusa (R)	Jim Jones (R)	J. D. Williams (D)	Lydia Justice-Edwards (R)	Jerry L. Evans (R)	23R, 19D	64R, 20D	Jim McClure (R)	Steve Symms (R)	Larry Craig (R)	Richard Stallings (D)	Bush/ Quayle (R) ✓
1990	Cecil Andrus (D)	Butch Otter (R)	Pete Cenarrusa (R)	Jim Jones (R)	J. D. Williams (D)	Lydia Justice-Edwards (R)	Jerry L. Evans (R)	23R, 19D	64R, 20D	Jim McClure (R)	Steve Symms (R)	Larry Craig (R)	Richard Stallings (D)	Bush/ Quayle (R) ✓
1991	Cecil Andrus (D)	Butch Otter (R)	Pete Cenarrusa (R)	Larry Echo Hawk (D)	J. D. Williams (D)	Lydia Justice-Edwards (R)	Jerry L. Evans (R)	21R, 21D (Note: The Republican Lt. Governor, Butch Otter, broke the tie to keep a Republican, Mike Crapo, as President Pro Tempore. The membership of committees, however, was split evenly between the parties.)	56R, 28D	Larry Craig (R)	Steve Symms (R)	Larry LaRocco (D)	Richard Stallings (D)	Bush/ Quayle (R) ✓
1992	Cecil Andrus (D)	Butch Otter (R)	Pete Cenarrusa (R)	Larry Echo Hawk (D)	J. D. Williams (D)	Lydia Justice-Edwards (R)	Jerry L. Evans (R)	21R, 21D	56R, 28D	Larry Craig (R)	Steve Symms (R)	Larry LaRocco (D)	Richard Stallings (D)	Bush/ Quayle (R) ✗
1993	Cecil Andrus (D)	Butch Otter (R)	Pete Cenarrusa (R)	Larry Echo Hawk (D)	J. D. Williams (D)	Lydia Justice-Edwards (R)	Jerry L. Evans (R)	23R, 12D	50R, 20D	Larry Craig (R)	Dirk Kempthorne (R)	Larry LaRocco (D)	Mike Crapo (R)	Bush/ Quayle (R) ✗
1994	Cecil Andrus (D)	Butch Otter (R)	Pete Cenarrusa (R)	Larry Echo Hawk (D)	J. D. Williams (D)	Lydia Justice-Edwards (R)	Jerry L. Evans (R)	23R, 12D	50R, 20D	Larry Craig (R)	Dirk Kempthorne (R)	Larry LaRocco (D)	Mike Crapo (R)	Bush/ Quayle (R) ✗
1995	Phil Batt (R)	Butch Otter (R)	Pete Cenarrusa (R)	Alan Lance (R)	J. D. Williams (D)	Lydia Justice-Edwards (R)	Anne C. Fox (R)	27R, 8D	57R, 13D	Larry Craig (R)	Dirk Kempthorne (R)	Helen Chenoweth-Hage (R)	Mike Crapo (R)	Bush/ Quayle (R) ✗
1996	Phil Batt (R)	Butch Otter (R)	Pete Cenarrusa (R)	Alan Lance (R)	J. D. Williams (D)	Lydia Justice-Edwards (R)	Anne C. Fox (R)	27R, 8D	57R, 13D	Larry Craig (R)	Dirk Kempthorne (R)	Helen Chenoweth-Hage (R)	Mike Crapo (R)	Dole/ Kemp (R) ✗
1997	Phil Batt (R)	Butch Otter (R)	Pete Cenarrusa (R)	Alan Lance (R)	J. D. Williams (D)	Lydia Justice-Edwards (R)	Anne C. Fox (R)	30R, 5D	59R, 11D	Larry Craig (R)	Dirk Kempthorne (R)	Helen Chenoweth-Hage (R)	Mike Crapo (R)	Dole/ Kemp (R) ✗
1998	Phil Batt (R)	Butch Otter (R)	Pete Cenarrusa (R)	Alan Lance (R)	J. D. Williams (D)	Lydia Justice-Edwards (R)	Anne C. Fox (R)	30R, 5D	59R, 11D	Larry Craig (R)	Dirk Kempthorne (R)	Helen Chenoweth-Hage (R)	Mike Crapo (R)	Dole/ Kemp (R) ✗
1999	Dirk Kempthorne (R)	Butch Otter (R)	Pete Cenarrusa (R)	Alan Lance (R)	J. D. Williams (D)	Ron Crane (R)	Marilyn Howard (D)	31R, 4D	58R, 12D	Larry Craig (R)	Mike Crapo (R)	Helen Chenoweth-Hage (R)	Mike Simpson (R)	Dole/ Kemp (R) ✗
2000	Dirk Kempthorne (R)	Butch Otter (R)	Pete Cenarrusa (R)	Alan Lance (R)	J. D. Williams (D)	Ron Crane (R)	Marilyn Howard (D)	31R, 4D	58R, 12D	Larry Craig (R)	Mike Crapo (R)	Helen Chenoweth-Hage (R)	Mike Simpson (R)	Bush/ Cheney (R) ✓
2001	Dirk Kempthorne (R)	Jack Riggs (R)	Pete Cenarrusa (R)	Alan Lance (R)	J. D. Williams (D)	Ron Crane (R)	Marilyn Howard (D)	32R, 3D	61R, 9D	Larry Craig (R)	Mike Crapo (R)	Butch Otter (R)	Mike Simpson (R)	Bush/ Cheney (R) ✓
2002	Dirk Kempthorne (R)	Jack Riggs (R)	Pete Cenarrusa (R)	Alan Lance (R)	J. D. Williams (D)	Ron Crane (R)	Marilyn Howard (D)	32R, 3D	61R, 9D	Larry Craig (R)	Mike Crapo (R)	Butch Otter (R)	Mike Simpson (R)	Bush/ Cheney (R) ✓
2002	Dirk Kempthorne (R)	Jack Riggs (R)	Pete Cenarrusa (R)	Alan Lance (R)	Keith Johnson (R)	Ron Crane (R)	Marilyn Howard (D)	32R, 3D	61R, 9D	Larry Craig (R)	Mike Crapo (R)	Butch Otter (R)	Mike Simpson (R)	Bush/ Cheney (R) ✓
2003	Dirk Kempthorne (R)	Jim Risch (R)	Ben Ysursa (R)	Lawrence Wasden (R)	Keith Johnson (R)	Ron Crane (R)	Marilyn Howard (D)	28R, 7D	54R, 16D	Larry Craig (R)	Mike Crapo (R)	Butch Otter (R)	Mike Simpson (R)	Bush/ Cheney (R) ✓
2004	Dirk Kempthorne (R)	Jim Risch (R)	Ben Ysursa (R)	Lawrence Wasden (R)	Keith Johnson (R)	Ron Crane (R)	Marilyn Howard (D)	28R, 7D	54R, 16D	Larry Craig (R)	Mike Crapo (R)	Butch Otter (R)	Mike Simpson (R)	Bush/ Cheney (R) ✓
2005	Dirk Kempthorne (R)	Jim Risch (R)	Ben Ysursa (R)	Lawrence Wasden (R)	Keith Johnson (R)	Ron Crane (R)	Marilyn Howard (D)	28R, 7D	57R, 13D	Larry Craig (R)	Mike Crapo (R)	Butch Otter (R)	Mike Simpson (R)	Bush/ Cheney (R) ✓
2006	Dirk Kempthorne (R)	Jim Risch (R)	Ben Ysursa (R)	Lawrence Wasden (R)	Keith Johnson (R)	Ron Crane (R)	Marilyn Howard (D)	28R, 7D	57R, 13D	Larry Craig (R)	Mike Crapo (R)	Butch Otter (R)	Mike Simpson (R)	Bush/ Cheney (R) ✓
2006	Jim Risch (R)	Mark Ricks (R) (Note: Appointed by governor to fill vacancy and confirmed by state Senate.)	Ben Ysursa (R)	Lawrence Wasden (R)	Keith Johnson (R)	Ron Crane (R)	Marilyn Howard (D)	28R, 7D	57R, 13D	Larry Craig (R)	Mike Crapo (R)	Butch Otter (R)	Mike Simpson (R)	Bush/ Cheney (R) ✓
2007	Butch Otter (R)	Jim Risch (R) (Note: Resigned following election to United States Senate.)	Ben Ysursa (R)	Lawrence Wasden (R)	Donna Jones (R)	Ron Crane (R)	Tom Luna (R)	28R, 7D	51R, 19D	Larry Craig (R)	Mike Crapo (R)	Bill Sali (R)	Mike Simpson (R)	Bush/ Cheney (R) ✓
2008	Butch Otter (R)	Jim Risch (R)	Ben Ysursa (R)	Lawrence Wasden (R)	Donna Jones (R)	Ron Crane (R)	Tom Luna (R)	28R, 7D	51R, 19D	Larry Craig (R)	Mike Crapo (R)	Bill Sali (R)	Mike Simpson (R)	McCain/ Palin (R) ✗
2009	Butch Otter (R)	Brad Little (R)	Ben Ysursa (R)	Lawrence Wasden (R)	Donna Jones (R)	Ron Crane (R)	Tom Luna (R)	28R, 7D	52R, 18D	Jim Risch (R)	Mike Crapo (R)	Walt Minnick (D)	Mike Simpson (R)	McCain/ Palin (R) ✗
2010	Butch Otter (R)	Brad Little (R)	Ben Ysursa (R)	Lawrence Wasden (R)	Donna Jones (R)	Ron Crane (R)	Tom Luna (R)	28R, 7D	52R, 18D	Jim Risch (R)	Mike Crapo (R)	Walt Minnick (D)	Mike Simpson (R)	McCain/ Palin (R) ✗
2011	Butch Otter (R)	Brad Little (R)	Ben Ysursa (R)	Lawrence Wasden (R)	Donna Jones (R)	Ron Crane (R)	Tom Luna (R)	28R, 7D	57R, 13D	Jim Risch (R)	Mike Crapo (R)	Raúl Labrador (R)	Mike Simpson (R)	McCain/ Palin (R) ✗
2012	Butch Otter (R)	Brad Little (R)	Ben Ysursa (R)	Lawrence Wasden (R)	Donna Jones (R)	Ron Crane (R)	Tom Luna (R)	28R, 7D	57R, 13D	Jim Risch (R)	Mike Crapo (R)	Raúl Labrador (R)	Mike Simpson (R)	Romney/ Ryan (R) ✗
2013	Butch Otter (R)	Brad Little (R)	Ben Ysursa (R)	Lawrence Wasden (R)	Brandon Woolf (R)	Ron Crane (R)	Tom Luna (R)	28R, 7D	57R, 13D	Jim Risch (R)	Mike Crapo (R)	Raúl Labrador (R)	Mike Simpson (R)	Romney/ Ryan (R) ✗
2014	Butch Otter (R)	Brad Little (R)	Ben Ysursa (R)	Lawrence Wasden (R)	Brandon Woolf (R)	Ron Crane (R)	Tom Luna (R)	28R, 7D	57R, 13D	Jim Risch (R)	Mike Crapo (R)	Raúl Labrador (R)	Mike Simpson (R)	Romney/ Ryan (R) ✗
2015	Butch Otter (R)	Brad Little (R)	Lawerence Denney (R)	Lawrence Wasden (R)	Brandon Woolf (R)	Ron Crane (R)	Sherri Ybarra (R)	28R, 7D	56R, 14D	Jim Risch (R)	Mike Crapo (R)	Raúl Labrador (R)	Mike Simpson (R)	Romney/ Ryan (R) ✗
2016	Butch Otter (R)	Brad Little (R)	Lawerence Denney (R)	Lawrence Wasden (R)	Brandon Woolf (R)	Ron Crane (R)	Sherri Ybarra (R)	28R, 7D	56R, 14D	Jim Risch (R)	Mike Crapo (R)	Raúl Labrador (R)	Mike Simpson (R)	Trump/ Pence (R) ✓
2017	Butch Otter (R)	Brad Little (R)	Lawerence Denney (R)	Lawrence Wasden (R)	Brandon Woolf (R)	Ron Crane (R)	Sherri Ybarra (R)	29R, 6D	59R, 11D	Jim Risch (R)	Mike Crapo (R)	Raúl Labrador (R)	Mike Simpson (R)	Trump/ Pence (R) ✓
2018	Butch Otter (R)	Brad Little (R)	Lawerence Denney (R)	Lawrence Wasden (R)	Brandon Woolf (R)	Ron Crane (R)	Sherri Ybarra (R)	29R, 6D	59R, 11D	Jim Risch (R)	Mike Crapo (R)	Raúl Labrador (R)	Mike Simpson (R)	Trump/ Pence (R) ✓
2019	Brad Little (R)	Janice McGeachin (R)	Lawerence Denney (R)	Lawrence Wasden (R)	Brandon Woolf (R)	Julie Ellsworth (R)	Sherri Ybarra (R)	28R, 7D	56R, 14D	Jim Risch (R)	Mike Crapo (R)	Russ Fulcher (R)	Mike Simpson (R)	Trump/ Pence (R) ✓
2020	Brad Little (R)	Janice McGeachin (R)	Lawerence Denney (R)	Lawrence Wasden (R)	Brandon Woolf (R)	Julie Ellsworth (R)	Sherri Ybarra (R)	28R, 7D	56R, 14D	Jim Risch (R)	Mike Crapo (R)	Russ Fulcher (R)	Mike Simpson (R)	Trump/ Pence (R) ✗
2021	Brad Little (R)	Janice McGeachin (R)	Lawerence Denney (R)	Lawrence Wasden (R)	Brandon Woolf (R)	Julie Ellsworth (R)	Sherri Ybarra (R)	28R, 7D	58R, 12D	Jim Risch (R)	Mike Crapo (R)	Russ Fulcher (R)	Mike Simpson (R)	Trump/ Pence (R) ✗
2022	Brad Little (R)	Janice McGeachin (R)	Lawerence Denney (R)	Lawrence Wasden (R)	Brandon Woolf (R)	Julie Ellsworth (R)	Sherri Ybarra (R)	28R, 7D	58R, 12D	Jim Risch (R)	Mike Crapo (R)	Russ Fulcher (R)	Mike Simpson (R)	Trump/ Pence (R) ✗
2023	Brad Little (R)	Scott Bedke (R)	Phil McGrane (R)	Raúl Labrador (R)	Brandon Woolf (R)	Julie Ellsworth (R)	Debbie Critchfield (R)	28R, 7D	59R, 11D	Jim Risch (R)	Mike Crapo (R)	Russ Fulcher (R)	Mike Simpson (R)	Trump/ Pence (R) ✗
2024	Brad Little (R)	Scott Bedke (R)	Phil McGrane (R)	Raúl Labrador (R)	Brandon Woolf (R)	Julie Ellsworth (R)	Debbie Critchfield (R)	28R, 7D	59R, 11D	Jim Risch (R)	Mike Crapo (R)	Russ Fulcher (R)	Mike Simpson (R)	Trump/ Vance (R) ✓
2025	Brad Little (R)	Scott Bedke (R)	Phil McGrane (R)	Raúl Labrador (R)	Brandon Woolf (R)	Julie Ellsworth (R)	Debbie Critchfield (R)	29R, 6D	61R, 9D	Jim Risch (R)	Mike Crapo (R)	Russ Fulcher (R)	Mike Simpson (R)	Trump/ Vance (R) ✓
2026	Brad Little (R)	Scott Bedke (R)	Phil McGrane (R)	Raúl Labrador (R)	Brandon Woolf (R)	Julie Ellsworth (R)	Debbie Critchfield (R)	29R, 6D	61R, 9D	Jim Risch (R)	Mike Crapo (R)	Russ Fulcher (R)	Mike Simpson (R)	Trump/ Vance (R) ✓
2027	Brad Little (R)	Scott Bedke (R)	Phil McGrane (R)	Raúl Labrador (R)	Brandon Woolf (R)	Julie Ellsworth (R)	Debbie Critchfield (R)	28R, 7D	56R, 14D	Jim Risch (R)	Mike Crapo (R)	Russ Fulcher (R)	Mike Simpson (R)	Trump/ Vance (R) ✓

== See also ==
- Politics in Idaho
