= 1944 Idaho gubernatorial election =

- November 7, 1944
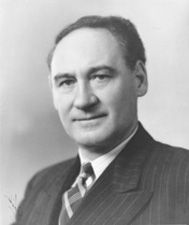

Nominee	Charles Gossett	W. H. Detweiler
Party	Democratic	Republican
Popular vote	109,527	98,532
Percentage	52.64%	47.36%
- County results Gossett: 50–60% 60–70% Detweiler: 50–60% 60–70% Tie: 50%
Governor before election
C. A. Bottolfsen
Republican
Elected Governor
Charles Gossett
Democratic

The 1944 Idaho gubernatorial election was held on November 7. Democratic nominee Charles Gossett defeated Republican nominee W. H. Detweiler for the open seat with 52.64% of the vote.

Incumbent governor C. A. Bottolfsen was the Republican nominee for the United States Senate, but was defeated by Democrat Glen Taylor in the general election.

This was the last time a Democrat was elected Governor of Idaho until 1970, when Cecil Andrus defeated Republican incumbent Don Samuelson.

== Primary elections ==
Primary elections were held on June 13, 1944.

=== Democratic primary ===
==== Candidates ====
- Charles Gossett, Nampa, former lieutenant governor
- Calvin Wright, Burley, state auditor
- George Curtis, secretary of state
- Fred Porter, Idaho Falls

=== Republican primary ===
==== Candidates ====
- W. H. Detweiler, Hazelton, former state legislator
- M. L. Horsley, Soda Springs businessman, former house speaker
- Edwin Nelson, Fenn, lieutenant governor
- Harvey Schwendiman, Newdale, former state agriculture commissioner
- Don Whitehead, Boise, former lieutenant governor and house speaker

== General election ==
=== Candidates ===
- Charles C. Gossett, Democratic
- W. H. Detweiler, Republican

=== Results ===
1944 Idaho gubernatorial election
Party	Candidate	Votes	%	±%
Democratic	Charles C. Gossett	109,527	52.64%	
Republican	W. H. Detweiler	98,532	47.36%	
Majority		10,995		
Turnout				
Democratic gain from Republican		Swing		
