= C. A. Robins =

American politician (1884–1970)

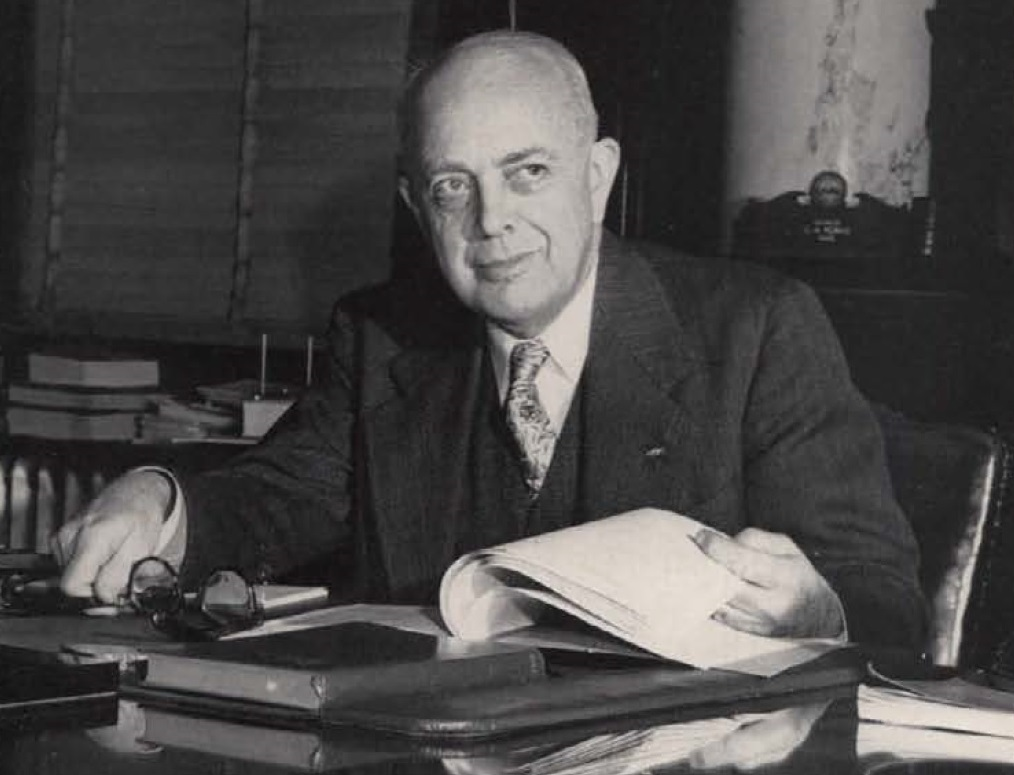
- From 1950's Gem of the Mountains, the yearbook of the University of Idaho

22nd Governor of Idaho
- In office January 6, 1947 – January 1, 1951
- Lieutenant: Donald S. Whitehead
- Preceded by: Arnold Williams
- Succeeded by: Len Jordan

Idaho Senate President pro tempore
- In office January 1943 – January 1945
- Preceded by: Perry Mitchell
- Succeeded by: J.E. Williams

Member of the Idaho Senate from the Benewah County district
- In office January 1939 – January 1947

Personal details
- Born: Charles Armington Robins; December 8, 1884 Defiance, Iowa
- Died: September 20, 1970 (aged 85) Lewiston, Idaho
- Resting place: Lewis Clark Memorial Gardens, Lewiston
- Party: Republican
- Spouse(s): Marguerite S. Granberry (m.1919–1938, her death); Olive Patricia Simpson (m.1939–1970, his death)
- Children: 3 daughters (w/ Simpson)
- Education: William Jewell College; University of Chicago
- Profession: Physician

Military service
- Allegiance: United States
- Branch/service: U.S. Army
- Years of service: 1918
- Rank: First lieutenant
- Unit: Medical Corps
- Battles/wars: World War I

Charles Armington Robins (December 8, 1884 – September 20, 1970) was an American physician and the 22nd governor of Idaho.

== Early years ==
Born in Iowa at Defiance in Shelby County, at age four Robins moved west with his family to Colorado, settling at La Junta in Otero County. He graduated in 1907 from William Jewell College in Liberty, Missouri, then taught high school in Missouri, Colorado, Montana, and Mississippi. He entered medical school in 1913 at Rush Medical College of the University of Chicago, working various night jobs to put himself through, and earned his MD in 1917.

== Career ==
During World War I, Robins entered the Medical Corps of the U.S. Army in August 1918 as a first lieutenant. and ended his military service on December 16, 1918. Given free transportation by the Great Northern Railway to look at two towns that needed physicians, he left Chicago the following week. He arrived in St. Maries, Idaho, on Christmas Eve and chose it over Three Forks, Montana, and stayed for 28 years, until elected governor. For a generation, Robins delivered nearly every baby in Benewah County.

Robins was a member of the state senate for four terms, from 1939 to 1947. He ran for governor in 1946, and was the first in Idaho to be elected to a four-year term; all previous governors had been elected to two-year terms. He handily defeated the incumbent, Arnold Williams, who had gained the office when his predecessor, Charles Gossett, resigned to be immediately appointed by Williams to a vacant seat in the U.S. Senate.

Idaho Gubernatorial Elections
| Year | Democrat | Votes | Pct | Republican | Votes | Pct |
|---|---|---|---|---|---|---|
| 1946 | Arnold Williams (inc.) | 79,131 | 43.6% | C. A. Robins | 102,233 | 56.4% |

- Williams was elected as lieutenant governor in 1944, and became governor in late 1945.

The new four-year term disallowed self-succession (re-election) until 1958, so Robins and his Republican successor in 1950, Len Jordan, served single four-year terms and retired from office. The state constitution was later amended, after receiving voter approval in the 1956 general election.

Robins was a delegate to the Republican National Convention in 1948 while in office as governor. Not allowed to compete for a second term in 1950, he ran for the U.S. Senate, but was defeated in the August primary by Herman Welker.

After leaving the governor's office in 1951 at age 66, Robins moved his residence from St. Maries to Lewiston and became the medical director of the north Idaho district of the Medical Service Bureau, later known as Regence Blue Shield.

== Personal ==
Robins married Marguerite Sherman Granberry (1892–1938) on July 8, 1919, in Hazlehurst, Mississippi; she died at age 46 in May 1938 and they had no children. He married Patricia Simpson (1914–1993) of St. Maries, one of his nurses, in November 1939 and they had three daughters: Patricia, Paula, and Rebecca.

He was a member of the American Legion, the American Medical Association, Phi Gamma Delta fraternity, Nu Sigma Nu professional fraternity, and Freemasons.

== Death ==
Robins died at age 85 in Lewiston on September 20, 1970, and is interred at Lewis Clark Memorial Gardens in Lewiston.

Party political offices
| Preceded by W. H. Detweiler | Republican Party nominee, Governor of Idaho; 1946 | Succeeded by Len Jordan |
