= 1892 Idaho gubernatorial election =

- November 8, 1892
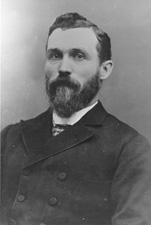

Nominee	William J. McConnell	John M. Burke	Abraham J. Crook
Party	Republican	Democratic	Populist
Popular vote	8,178	6,769	4,865
Percentage	40.74%	33.72%	24.23%
- Results by county McConnell: 30–40% 40–50% 50–60% 60–70% Burke: 40–50% 50–60% Crook: 40–50% 50–60% 60–70%
Governor before election
Norman Bushnell Willey (acting)
Republican
Elected Governor
William J. McConnell
Republican

The 1892 Idaho gubernatorial election was held on November 8, 1892.

Acting Governor Norman Bushnell Willey was defeated for renomination at the Republican convention.

Republican nominee William J. McConnell defeated Democratic nominee John M. Burke and Populist nominee Abraham J. Crook with 40.74% of the vote.

== Nominations ==
Nominations were made by party conventions.

=== Democratic nomination ===
The Democratic convention was held on August 25 and 26 at Boise. John M. Burke was nominated on the tenth ballot.

==== Candidates ====
- John M. Ballentine (Note: Some sources record this candidate's name as James M. Ballentine.)
- John M. Burke
- Edward A. Stevenson, former Territorial Governor

==== Results ====
Results of the balloting were as follows:

	Gubernatorial Ballot									
	1st	2nd	3rd	4th	5th	6th	7th	8th	9th	10th
Burke	34	36	33	33	34	34	34	34	34	49
Stevenson	46	47	47	47	46	44	41	41	42	46
Ballentine	15	12	15	15	15	17	20	20	19	0

=== Republican nomination ===
The Republican convention was held on August 18 and 19 at Moscow. William J. McConnell was nominated on the second ballot.

==== Candidates ====
- William J. McConnell, former U.S. Senator
- A. B. Moss
- Wells
- N. B. Willey, acting Governor

==== Results ====
Results of the balloting were as follows:

	Gubernatorial Ballot	
	1st	2nd
McConnell	60	66
Willey	43	38
Moss	25	25
Wells	2	1

=== People's Party nomination ===
The People's Party convention was held on August 18 at Boise. A. J. Crook was nominated on the first ballot.

==== Candidates ====
- A. J. Crook

==== Results ====
People's Party convention results
Party	Candidate	Votes	%
Populist	A. J. Crook	45	76.3
Populist	Scattering	14	23.7
Total votes		59	100.00

== General election ==
=== Candidates ===
- William J. McConnell, Republican
- John M. Burke, Democratic
- Abraham J. Crook, People's (Note: Some sources record this candidate's name as Andrew J. Crook.)
- Joseph A. Clark, Prohibition

=== Results ===
1892 Idaho gubernatorial election
Party	Candidate	Votes	%	±%
Republican	William J. McConnell	8,178	40.74%	−15.61%
Democratic	John M. Burke	6,769	33.72%	−9.93%
Populist	Abraham J. Crook	4,865	24.23%	N/A
Prohibition	Joseph A. Clark	264	1.32%	N/A
Majority		1,409	7.02%	
Turnout		20,076	100.00%	
Republican hold		Swing		

== Bibliography ==
- Dubin, Michael J. (2014). United States Gubernatorial Elections, 1861-1911: The Official Results by State and County. Jefferson, North Carolina: McFarland. ISBN 978-0-7864-4722-0.
- Glashan, Roy R. (1979). American Governors and Gubernatorial Elections, 1775-1978. Meckler Books. ISBN 0-930466-17-9.
