= 1946 Idaho gubernatorial election =

- November 5, 1946
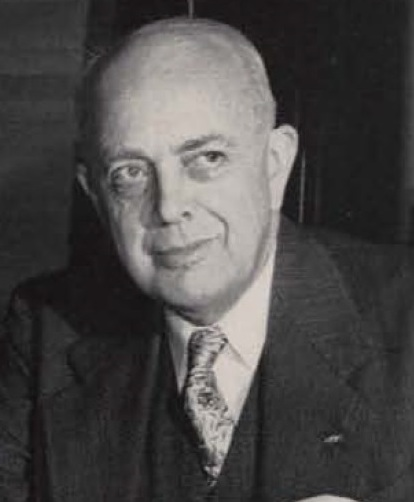

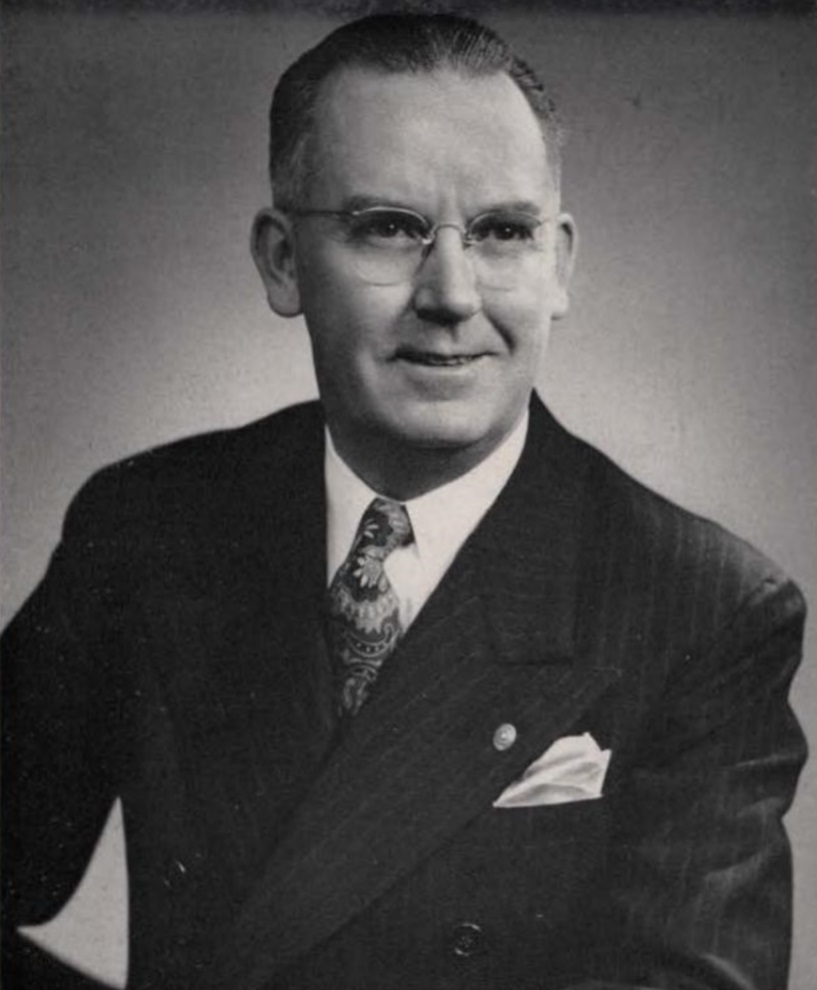
Nominee	C. A. Robins	Arnold Williams
Party	Republican	Democratic
Popular vote	102,233	79,131
Percentage	56.37%	43.63%
- County results Robins: 50–60% 60–70% Williams: 50–60% 60–70%
Governor before election
Arnold Williams
Democratic
Elected Governor
C. A. Robins
Republican

The 1946 Idaho gubernatorial election was held on November 5. Republican nominee C. A. Robins defeated Democratic incumbent Arnold Williams with 56.37% of the vote.

Idaho changed the term for governor from two to four years starting with this election, and the winner was not allowed to run for a second term (self-succession) until 1958. Williams had become governor in November 1945, following the resignation of Charles Gossett, whom Williams immediately appointed to the U.S. Senate.

== Primary elections ==
Primary elections were held on June 11, 1946.

=== Democratic primary ===
==== Candidates ====
- Arnold Williams, St. Anthony, incumbent governor
- Franklin Girard, Coeur d'Alene, former secretary of state
- Asher Wilson, Twin Falls, state board of education member

=== Republican primary ===
==== Candidates ====
- C. A. Robins, St. Maries physician, state senator
- C. A. Bottolfsen, Arco newspaper publisher and farmer, former governor
- Adam Blackstone, Marsing rancher, county commissioner

== General election ==
=== Candidates ===
- C. A. Robins, Republican
- Arnold Williams, Democratic

=== Results ===
1946 Idaho gubernatorial election
Party	Candidate	Votes	%	±%
Republican	C. A. Robins	102,233	56.37%	
Democratic	Arnold Williams (incumbent)	79,131	43.63%	
Majority		23,102		
Turnout		181,364		
Republican gain from Democratic		Swing		
