= Salem Township, Highland County, Ohio =

Township in Ohio, US

- Township
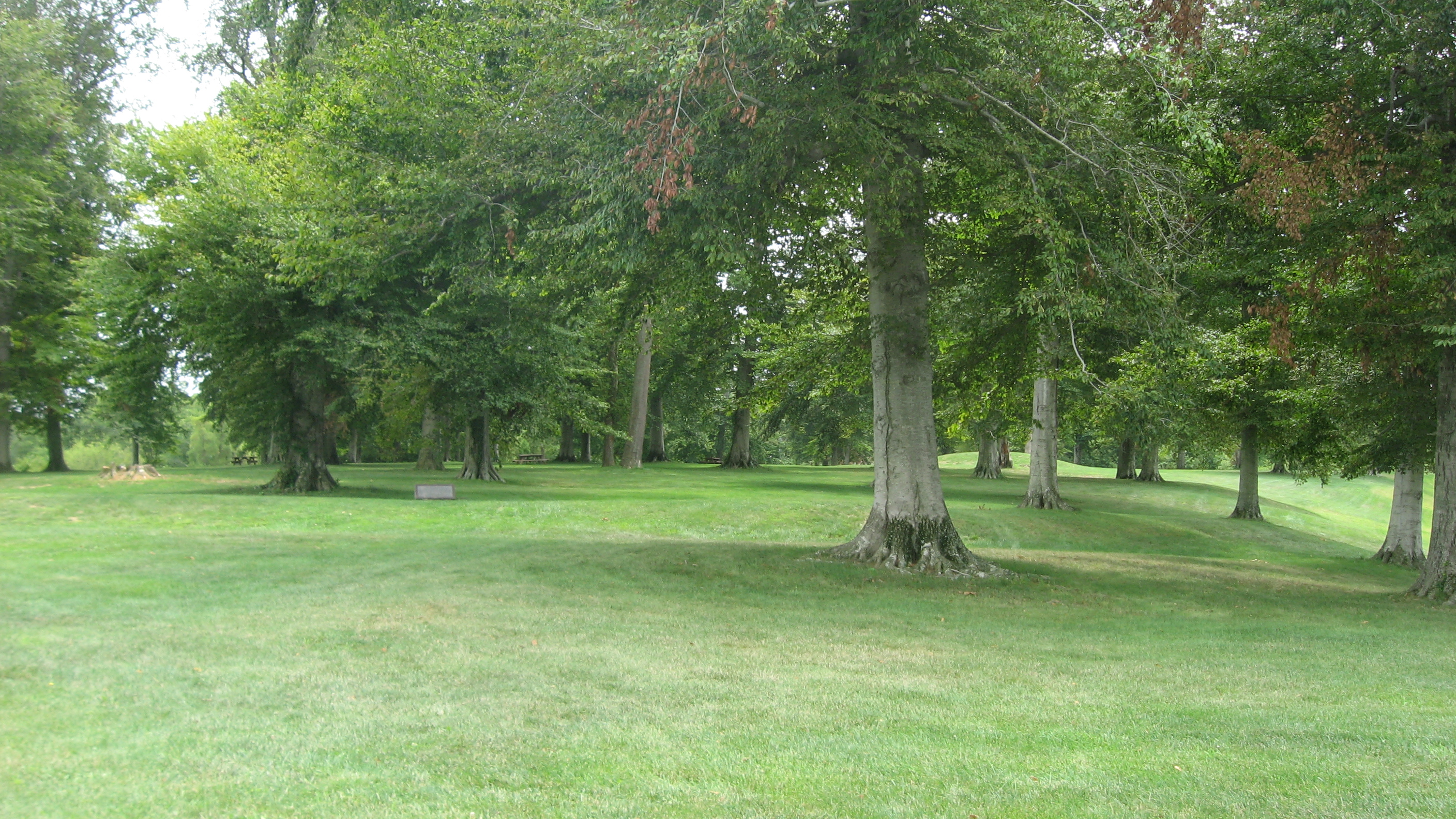
- The Fort Salem Indian Mound on Certier Road

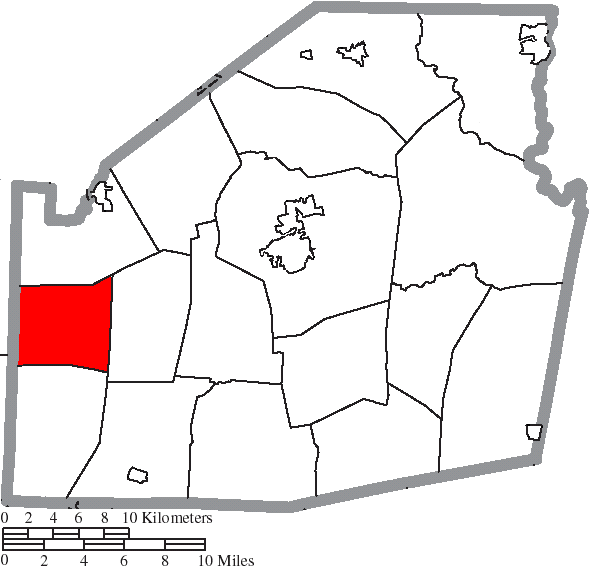
- Location of Salem Township in Highland County
- Coordinates: 39°9′10″N 83°48′56″W
- Country: United States
- State: Ohio
- County: Highland

Area
  - Total: 19.6 sq mi (50.8 km^{2})
  - Land: 19.6 sq mi (50.8 km^{2})
  - Water: 0 sq mi (0.0 km^{2})
- Elevation: 1,004 ft (306 m)

Population (2020)
  - Total: 782
  - Density: 39.9/sq mi (15.4/km^{2})
- Time zone: UTC-5 (Eastern (EST))
  - Summer (DST): UTC-4 (EDT)
- FIPS code: 39-69862
- GNIS feature ID: 1086312

Salem Township is one of the seventeen townships of Highland County, Ohio, United States. As of the 2020 census the population was 782.

== Geography ==
Located in the western part of the county, it borders the following townships:

- Dodson Township – north
- Hamer Township – east
- Clay Township – south
- Green Township, Brown County – west
- Perry Township, Brown County – southwest

No municipalities are located in Salem Township, although the unincorporated community of Pricetown lies in the township's east.

== Name and history ==
It is one of fourteen Salem Townships statewide.

== Government ==
The township is governed by a three-member board of trustees, who are elected in November of odd-numbered years to a four-year term beginning on the following January 1. Two are elected in the year after the presidential election and one is elected in the year before it. There is also an elected township fiscal officer, who serves a four-year term beginning on April 1 of the year after the election, which is held in November of the year before the presidential election. Vacancies in the fiscal officership or on the board of trustees are filled by the remaining trustees.
