= Pricetown, Highland County, Ohio =

Unincorporated community in Ohio, U.S.

Coordinates: 39°08′35″N 83°48′07″W

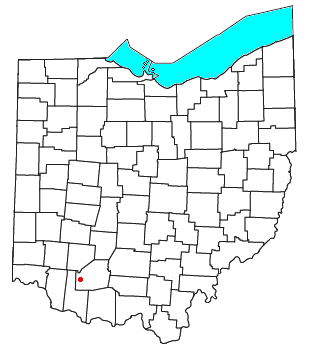
Location of Pricetown, Ohio

Pricetown is an unincorporated community in eastern Salem Township, Highland County, Ohio, United States.

== History ==
It was platted by Elijah, David and Jane Faris, along with Alexander Murphy on April 13, 1847, and named for Common Pleas Judge J.W. Price of Hillsboro. Its mail service is from Lynchburg. The community is on State Route 131 near the headwaters of the Oak Creek.

== Gallery ==
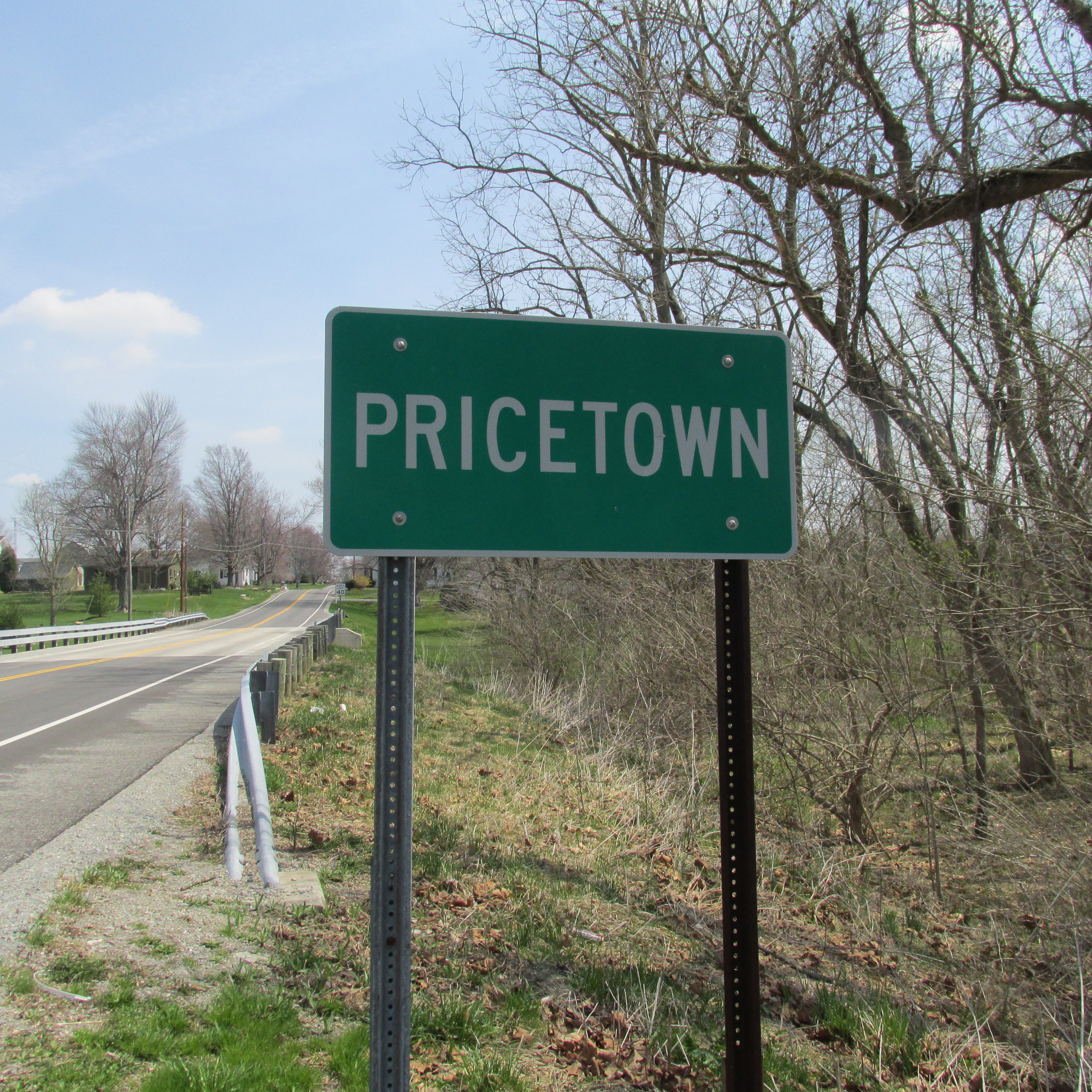
Pricetown community sign

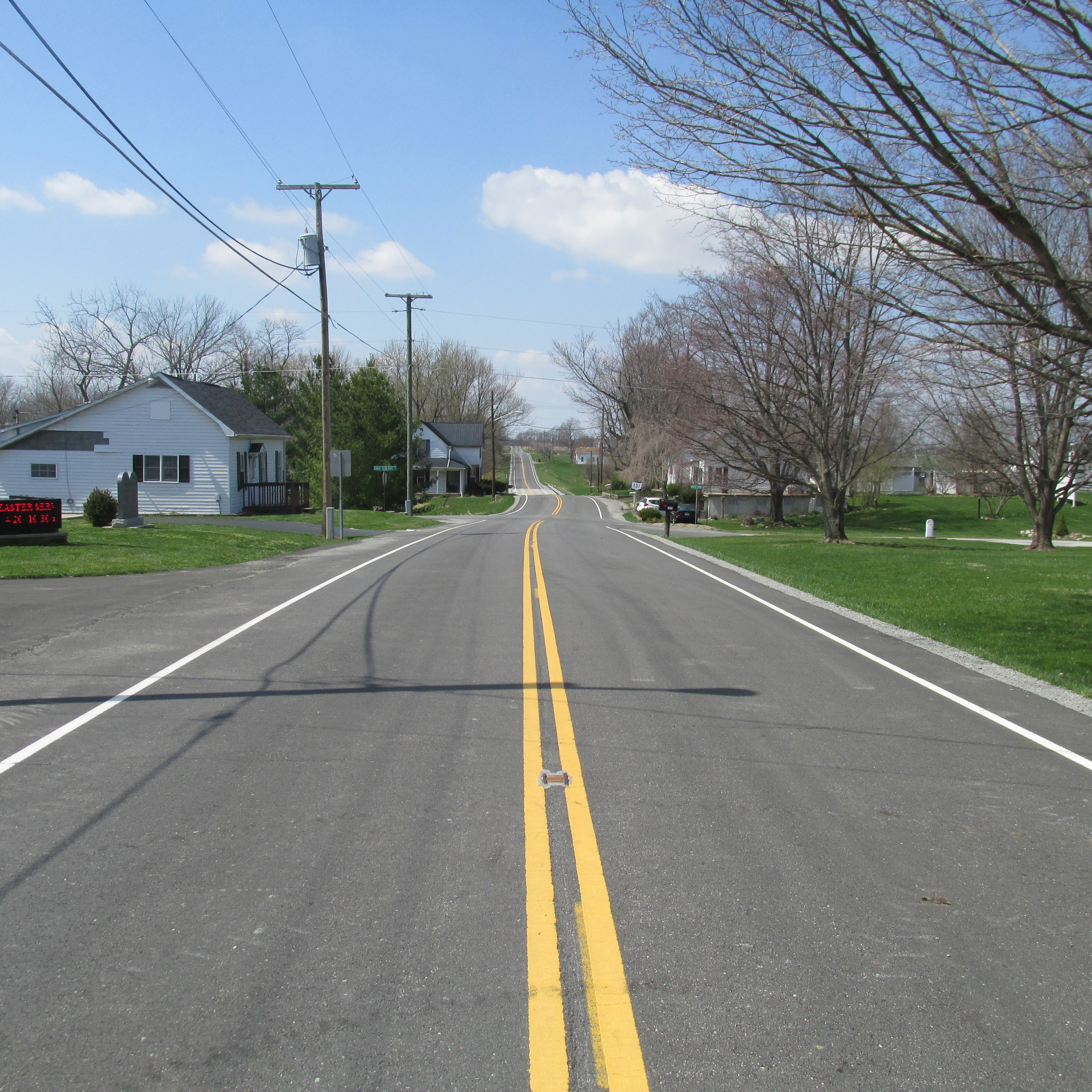
Looking west on Ohio Highway 131 at the intersection of Ruble Cemetery Road (left) and North Fork Road (right) in Pricetown

== Notable person ==
- Charles C. Gossett, 20th governor of Idaho and United States Senator from Idaho
