= George F. Moore (Idaho politician) =

American politician

G. F. Moore

5th Lieutenant Governor of Idaho
- In office January 4, 1897 – January 2, 1899
- Governor: Frank Steunenberg
- Preceded by: F. J. Mills
- Succeeded by: J. H. Hutchinson

Personal details
- Born: March 9, 1861 Lewisburg, Ohio
- Died: May 24, 1938 (aged 77) Seattle, Washington
- Party: Democratic
- Spouse: Anna

George F. Moore (March 9, 1861 – May 24, 1938) was a Democratic politician from Idaho. He served as the fifth lieutenant governor of Idaho. Moore was elected in 1897 along with Governor Frank Steunenberg. He died in 1938 in Seattle, Washington.

Political offices
Preceded by F. J. Mills	Lieutenant Governor of Idaho; January 4, 1897–January 2, 1899	Succeeded by J. H. Hutchinson
