= F. J. Mills =

American politician

4th Lieutenant Governor of Idaho
- In office January 7, 1895 – January 4, 1897
- Governor: William J. McConnell
- Preceded by: F. B. Willis
- Succeeded by: George F. Moore

State Engineer of Idaho
- In office 1895–1898

Personal details
- Born: Frederick John Mills; April 29, 1865 Topsham, Vermont
- Died: September 28, 1953 (aged 88) Pasadena, California
- Party: Republican
- Spouse: Laura Elise Hopf (m. 1893)
- Education: University of Vermont (1886)
- Profession: Engineer

Frederick John Mills (April 28, 1865 – September 28, 1953) was a Republican politician and prominent engineer from the U.S. State of Idaho. He served as the fourth lieutenant governor of Idaho. Mills was elected in 1895 along with Governor William J. McConnell. Mills also served as State Engineer of Idaho from 1895 until 1897.

On October 8, 1899, Mills shot and killed J.C. O'Melveny in O'Melveny's office in Salt Lake City, Utah. An hour before the shooting, Mrs. Mills had confessed to her husband an affair with O'Melveny. Mills was acquitted at his January 1900 trial.

Political offices
Preceded by F. B. Willis	Lieutenant Governor of Idaho; January 4, 1895–January 7, 1897	Succeeded by George F. Moore
