= F. B. Willis =

American politician

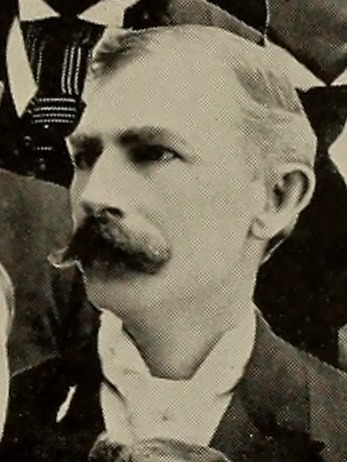

3rd Lieutenant Governor of Idaho
- In office January 2, 1893 – January 7, 1895
- Governor: William J. McConnell
- Preceded by: John S. Gray
- Succeeded by: F. J. Mills

Personal details
- Born: October 10, 1844 St. Lawrence County, New York
- Died: September 9, 1914 (aged 69) Lewiston, Idaho
- Party: Republican
- Spouse(s): Anna O. Diehl (1887–1889; died); Della B. Burns (m. 1892)
- Education: St. Lawrence Academy

Frank B. Willis (October 10, 1844 – September 9, 1914) was an American politician from Idaho. A Republican, he served as the third lieutenant governor of Idaho. Willis was elected in 1893 along with Governor William J. McConnell.

He was born in New York in 1844, and he died in 1914 in Lewiston, Idaho of an ulcer complicated by a hemorrhage. At the time of his death he was serving as the City Treasurer of Lewiston.

Political offices
Preceded by John S. Gray	Lieutenant Governor of Idaho; January 2, 1893–January 4, 1895	Succeeded by F. J. Mills
