= J. H. Hutchinson =

American politician

6th Lieutenant Governor of Idaho
- In office January 2, 1899 – January 7, 1901
- Governor: Frank Steunenberg
- Preceded by: George F. Moore
- Succeeded by: Thomas F. Terrell

Personal details
- Born: May 21, 1864 Central City, Colorado
- Died: September 5, 1930 (aged 66) San Francisco, California
- Party: Democratic
- Spouse: Helen Hays
- Profession: Miner

Joseph H. Hutchinson (May 21, 1864 – September 5, 1930) was a Democratic politician from Idaho. He served as the sixth lieutenant governor of Idaho. Hutchinson was elected in 1899 along with Governor Frank Steunenberg. He died in 1930 after a short illness.

Political offices
Preceded by George F. Moore	Lieutenant Governor of Idaho; January 2, 1899–January 7, 1901	Succeeded by Thomas F. Terrell
