= A. R. McCabe =

American politician

27th Lieutenant Governor of Idaho
- In office March 20, 1946 – January 6, 1947
- Governor: Arnold Williams
- Preceded by: Arnold Williams
- Succeeded by: Donald S. Whitehead

Personal details
- Born: June 1, 1896 New Westminster, British Columbia
- Died: May 24, 1985 (aged 88) St. Maries, Idaho
- Party: Democratic
- Spouse: Esther Edeen (1930–Apr 10, 1985; her death)

Ambrose Roscoe McCabe (June 1, 1896 – May 24, 1985) was a Democratic politician from Idaho. He served as the 27th lieutenant governor of Idaho. He was born in New Westminster, British Columbia. He was a dentist and died at his home in St. Maries, Idaho in 1985.

Political offices
Preceded by Arnold Williams	Lieutenant Governor of Idaho; March 20, 1946–January 6, 1947	Succeeded by Donald S. Whitehead
