= John S. Gray (Idaho politician) =

American politician

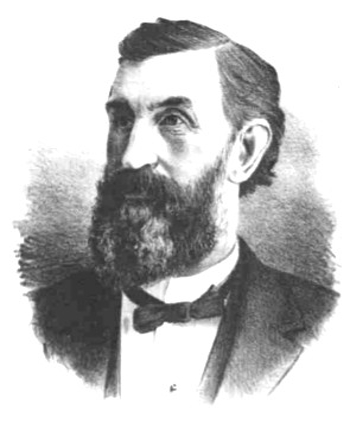
- Lithograph of Gray from The West Shore in 1891

2nd Lieutenant Governor of Idaho
- In office December 18, 1890 – September 12, 1891
- Governor: N. B. Willey
- Preceded by: N. B. Willey
- Succeeded by: F. B. Willis

Member of the Idaho Senate
- In office 1890 – September 12, 1891
- Constituency: Ada County

Delegate to the Idaho Constitutional Convention
- In office July 4, 1889 – August 6, 1889
- Constituency: Ada County

Member of the Idaho House of Representatives
- In office 1880–1881
- Constituency: Ada County

Idaho Territorial Treasurer
- In office January 16, 1871 – February 16, 1872
- Preceded by: Edward C. Sterling
- Succeeded by: John Huntoon

Personal details
- Born: 1833 Watertown, New York, U.S.
- Died: September 12, 1891 (aged 58) Boise, Idaho, U.S.
- Party: Republican

John S. Gray (1833 – September 12, 1891) was a Republican politician from Idaho.

Gray was born in Watertown, New York, in 1833, and he moved West, to Yreka, California, in 1857. He came to Idaho Territory in 1862, first to Orofino, then to Florence, before settling in Boise. He lost elections for district attorney in 1864 and sheriff in 1868 before being appointed as territorial treasurer in 1871. He was elected to represent Ada County in the territorial house of representatives in 1880. Gray then served as a delegate to the Idaho Constitutional Convention for Ada County in 1889. He was elected to the first state senate in 1890, and was elected as president pro tempore of that body. Upon Lieutenant Governor N. B. Willey's elevation to the governorship on December 18, 1890, Gray, as president pro tempore of the senate, became 2nd lieutenant governor. He died in Boise on September 12, 1891, at the age of 58.

Political offices
Preceded by N. B. Willey	Lieutenant Governor of Idaho; December 18, 1890–January 2, 1893	Succeeded by F. B. Willis
