= Arnold Williams (American politician) =

American politician (1898–1970)

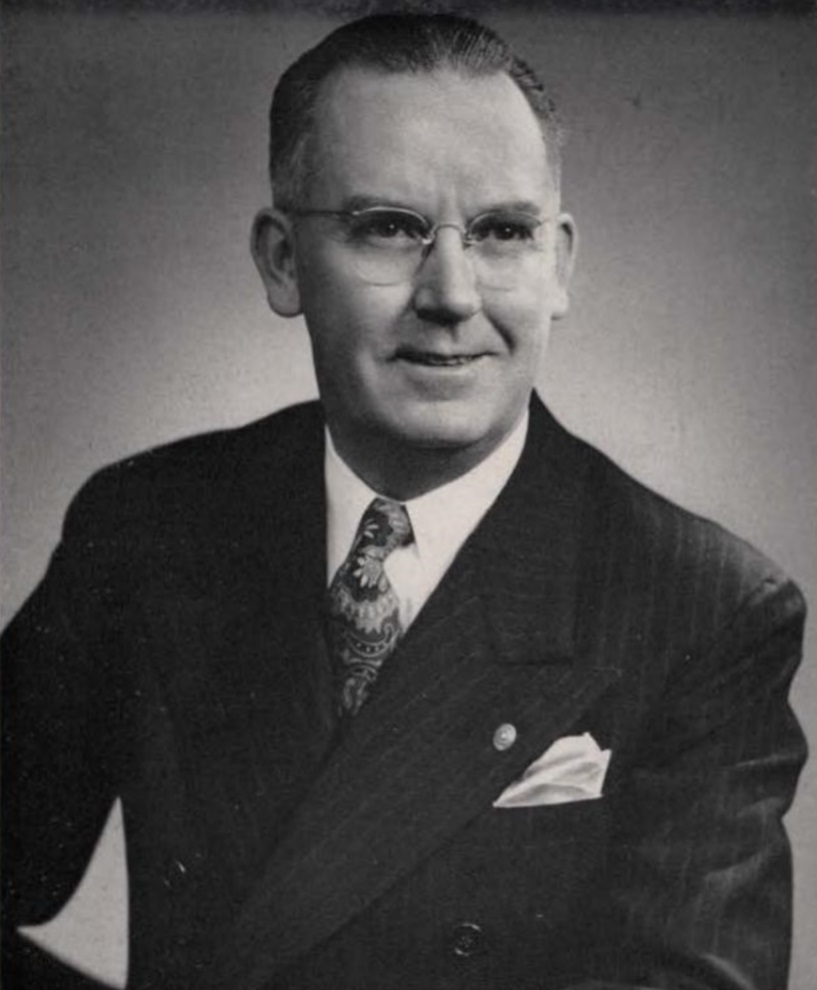
- From 1946's Gem of the Mountains, the yearbook of the University of Idaho

Secretary of State of Idaho
- In office January 5, 1959 – March 29, 1966
- Governor: Robert E. Smylie
- Preceded by: James H. Young
- Succeeded by: Louis E. Clapp

21st Governor of Idaho
- In office November 17, 1945 – January 6, 1947
- Lieutenant: A. R. McCabe
- Preceded by: Charles Gossett
- Succeeded by: C. A. Robins

26th Lieutenant Governor of Idaho
- In office January 1, 1945 – November 17, 1945
- Governor: Charles Gossett
- Preceded by: Edwin Nelson
- Succeeded by: A. R. McCabe (1946)

Member of the Idaho House of Representatives
- In office 1936

Personal details
- Born: May 21, 1898 Fillmore, Utah, U.S.
- Died: May 25, 1970 (aged 72) Idaho Falls, Idaho, U.S.
- Resting place: Fielding Memorial Park Cemetery, Idaho Falls
- Party: Democratic
- Spouse(s): Luella Huskinson (1900–1993)
- Children: 2
- Education: Henagers Business College

Military service
- Allegiance: United States
- Branch/service: United States Army
- Rank: Private
- Unit: Infantry
- Battles/wars: World War I

Arnold Williams (May 21, 1898 – May 25, 1970) was an American politician and businessman who served as the 21st governor of Idaho from 1945 to 1947. A member of the Democratic Party, he later served as Idaho's secretary of state from 1959 to 1966.

Williams was the last Governor of Idaho from the Democratic Party until Cecil Andrus in 1971.

== Early life and education ==
Born in Fillmore, Utah, Williams attended its public school and Henagers Business College in Salt Lake City.

== Career ==
Williams served in the U.S. Army during World War I. Following his discharge, he established a successful dry cleaning business in Rexburg, Idaho. After serving in government at the local and county level, he was elected to the Idaho House in 1936 and served several terms.

Williams was elected lieutenant governor in 1944 and became governor in November 1945. He finished the unexpired term of Charles Gossett, who resigned after ten months and was immediately appointed by Williams to the U.S. Senate seat left vacant by the death of Republican John Thomas.

Williams became the state's first Mormon governor and was the Democratic nominee for governor in 1946, but was defeated in the general election by Republican C. A. Robins, a physician from St. Maries. The first Mormon to be elected as Idaho's governor was incumbent Democrat John Evans in 1978.

Williams was a delegate to the Democratic National Convention from Idaho in 1948, and later was elected secretary of state of Idaho in 1958, and served until 1966.

== Personal life ==
Williams married Luella Huskinson and they had two children. He died at age 72 in Idaho Falls on May 25, 1970, and is interred at Fielding Memorial Park Cemetery in Idaho Falls.

Political offices
Preceded by Edwin Nelson	Lieutenant Governor of Idaho; January 1, 1945 – November 17, 1945	Succeeded by A. R. McCabe
Preceded by Charles C. Gossett	Governor of Idaho; November 17, 1945 – January 6, 1947	Succeeded by C. A. Robins
Preceded by James H. Young	Secretary of State of Idaho; January 5, 1959 – March 29, 1966	Succeeded by Louis E. Clapp
Party political offices
Preceded by Charles C. Gossett	Democratic Party nominee, Governor of Idaho; 1946 (lost)	Succeeded by Calvin E. Wright
