= N. B. Willey =

American politician (1838–1921)

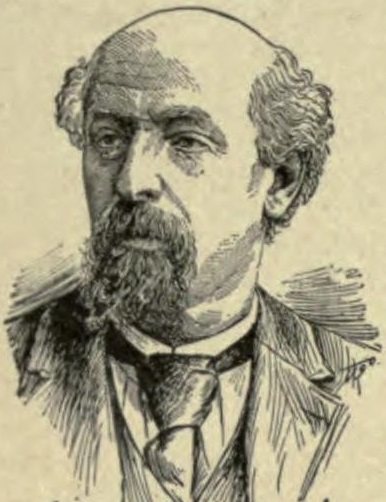
- Willey as depicted in 1904's National Cyclopaedia of American Biography

2nd Governor of Idaho
- In office December 18, 1890 – January 2, 1893
- Lieutenant: John S. Gray
- Preceded by: George L. Shoup
- Succeeded by: William J. McConnell

1st Lieutenant Governor of Idaho
- In office October 1, 1890 – December 18, 1890
- Governor: George L. Shoup
- Preceded by: Position established
- Succeeded by: John S. Gray

Personal details
- Born: March 25, 1838 Guilford, New York
- Died: October 22, 1921 (aged 83) Topeka, Kansas
- Party: Republican
- Profession: Mining

Norman Bushnell Willey (March 25, 1838 – October 22, 1921) was the second governor of Idaho from 1890 until 1893.

== Early life ==
Willey was born in Guilford, New York, the son of Hiram and Caroline (Church) Willey. He was educated at the Delaware Literary Institute in Franklin, New York. He moved to California at age 20, where he became a gold miner. In 1864, he moved to Warren, Idaho, where he continued to work as a miner and became active in local politics, including service as a member of Idaho County's Board of Commissioners, County Treasurer, and County School Superintendent. Willey also became involved in other business ventures, including owning and operating a sawmill. He later studied law, attained admission to the bar, and practiced in Idaho County.

== Career ==
A Republican, Willey was elected to Idaho's legislative council in 1872, and served until 1873. Elected to another term in 1878, he served until 1889, and was the Council President in 1879. During his legislative career, he was one of the few council members who opposed the effort to reunite North Idaho with Washington State. In 1888, he was defeated for reelection. During his two terms, he became friends with Milton Kelly – a former supreme court justice who had become a prominent newspaper editor. This led to a career in the field of journalism, where his reports as mine superintendent and state correspondent found wide audience.

In 1890, another opportunity arose for Willey in politics when Idaho gained admission as a state. George Shoup was chosen to serve as governor; however, he only agreed to do so once he was assured that his service would end as governor in late 1890, and that he would then become a United States senator. Shoup arranged Willey's election as Lieutenant Governor, which ensured that he would succeed to the governorship after Shoup resigned.

During his tenure, Willey oversaw the Idaho government's transition from territorial to state, from creation of state agencies to the design for a state seal. He also dealt with a labor-management strike between miners and mine owners in the Coeur D'Alene region, ultimately declaring martial law, and calling in both the militia and federal troops. Willey continued to serve as governor until 1893; he lost renomination in 1892 to William J. McConnell, who went on to win the general election.

After leaving office, Willey accepted a position as a mine superintendent in Blue Canyon, California. He never married or had children, and after several business reverses he moved to Topeka, Kansas to live with relatives.

== Death ==
In his later years, Willey became a resident of Shawnee County's poorhouse, and the state of Idaho eventually appropriated $1,200 as an unofficial pension to assist him in his old age. He died in Topeka on October 22, 1921, and was buried at Auburn Cemetery in Auburn, Kansas.

Political offices
Preceded by (none)	Lieutenant Governor of Idaho; October 1890 – December 1890	Succeeded by John S. Gray
Preceded by George L. Shoup	Governor of Idaho; December 1890 – January 1893	Succeeded by William J. McConnell
