= Edwin Nelson (politician) =

American politician

Edwin Nelson (September 28, 1881 – September 19, 1961) was a Republican politician from Idaho. He served as the 25th Lieutenant Governor of Idaho. Nelson was elected in 1943 along with Governor C. A. Bottolfsen. He died in Grangeville, Idaho in 1961.

Political offices
Preceded by Charles C. Gossett	Lieutenant Governor of Idaho; January 4, 1943–January 1, 1945	Succeeded by Arnold Williams
