= Calvin E. Wright =

American politician (1909–1988)

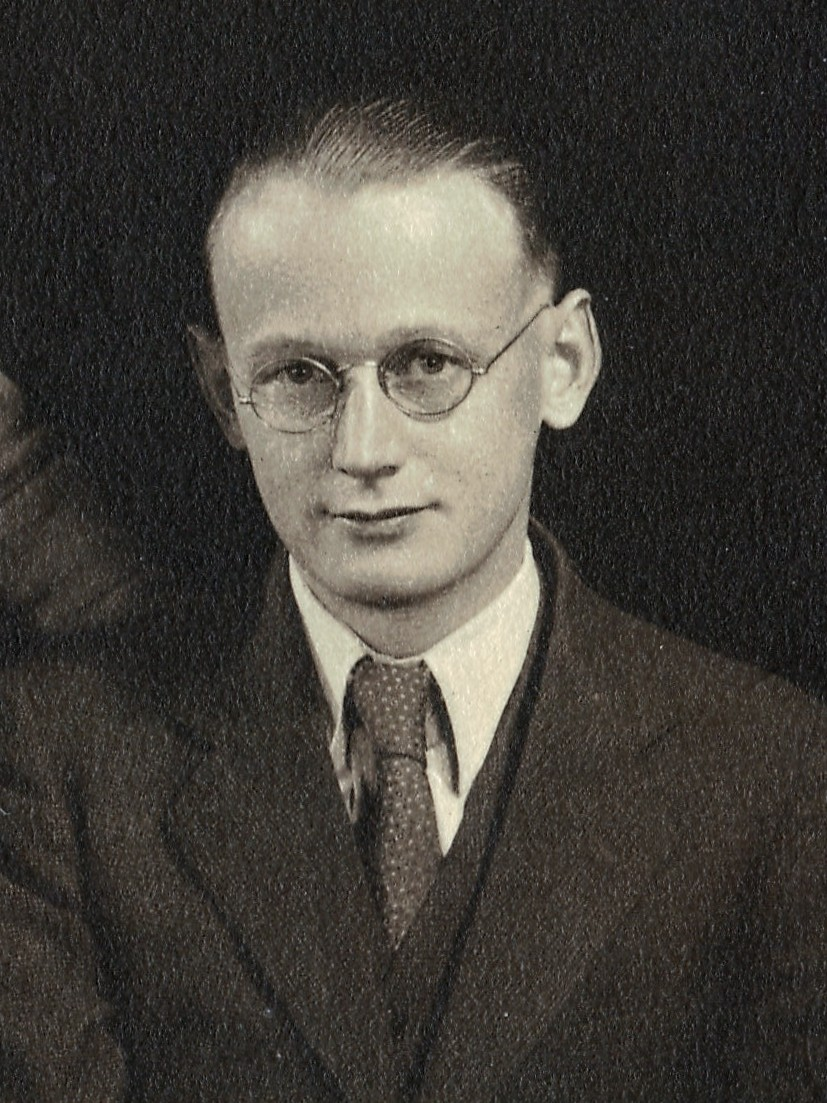

13th State Auditor/Controller of Idaho
- In office January 2, 1939 – January 1, 1945
- Governor: C. A. Bottolfsen; Chase A. Clark
- Preceded by: Harry C. Parsons
- Succeeded by: Ernest G. Hansen

Auditor of Cassia County
- In office January 5, 1935 – July 15, 1937
- Preceded by: B.F. Wilson
- Succeeded by: George Booth Jr.

Personal details
- Born: Calvin Everett Wright; January 29, 1909 Herington, Kansas, U.S.
- Died: July 28, 1988 (aged 79) Boise, Idaho, U.S.
- Resting place: Morris Hill Cemetery; Boise, Idaho
- Party: Democratic
- Spouse: Gwendolyn Sathre (m. 1929)
- Children: 2 (including Beverly Brunelle, Thomas Calvin Wright)
- Education: Stanford University (BA); University of Idaho

Calvin Everett Wright (January 29, 1909 – July 28, 1988) was an American Democratic politician and civil servant from Idaho. He was the state auditor 1939-1945 and later Democratic nominee for Governor of Idaho in 1950. Wright was defeated by Republican Len Jordan.

== Early life and education ==
Wright was born January 29, 1909, in Herington, Kansas to Lee Addison Wright and Ethyl Rathbone. Lee Wright was a lumber yard foreman for the Rock Island Line railroad. As a young boy his family moved to Watts section of Los Angeles, CA, for two years then to Lund, Utah where Lee Wright secured a Homestead Act entry in 1919. The family subsequently moved to Burley, Idaho the following year and established the Wright Oil & Gas Co. Wright graduated from Burley High School in 1926 where he was senior class president.

Wright attended Stanford University and the University of Idaho, completing course work in six semesters by the end of calendar year 1929, which included a semester interruption of schooling due to health issues. His year at University of Idaho Wright joined the Sigma Chi fraternity accompanied by his popular German Shepherd, “Comrade,” who was regaled as the fraternity mascot due to Wright’s dubious claim that Comrade was a descendent of the famous movie dog Rin Tin Tin.

Wright married Gwendolyn Sathre on November 20, 1929 in Palo Alto, CA and during their honeymoon took their mothers to the Big Game which Stanford won 21-6. They returned to Burley after completion of the semester.

== Career ==
After graduation Wright returned to Burley where he was employed as a school teacher at Rupert High School and was a stringer for the Twin Falls Times News and other local newspapers. Interested in politics, Wright attended the Idaho State Democratic Convention in 1930 with his father and his father-in-law Andrew G. Sathre where Wright met Democratic gubernatorial nominee C. Ben Ross, becoming an early supporter of Ross who was later elected Governor that fall (Sathre, the nominee for Idaho Attorney General, was defeated).

Wright was also an early leader in the Young Democrats when that organization formed in 1932, supporting the Presidential campaign for Franklin D. Roosevelt as well as the re-election of Ross.

In November 1933 Ross tapped Wright to be secretary and disbursing officer for the Cassia County portion of the Civil Works Administration. The state and local governments - with Federal financial support - administered this early New Deal program, created under the Federal Emergency Relief Administration. Wright was later elevated to secretary of the state drought committee by Ross in June 1934, temporarily relocating to Boise to disburse more than $1.5 million in drought projects across the state.

Receiving the Democratic nomination by write-in for Cassia County Clerk/Auditor, Wright returned to Burley and campaigned for the position, ousting incumbent County Auditor B.F. Wilson, 2,309 to 1,643 votes. Wright served as County Auditor beginning in 1935.

In 1936 Governor Ross recruited Wright to run in the Democratic primary for State Auditor, taking on incumbent Harry Parsons, a political adversary of Ross. Wright lost the primary in a 38-62% vote share.

In June 1937 Wright was appointed Administrator of the State Insurance Fund by Governor Barzilla Clark. Wright resigned the County Auditor/Recorder seat and ran the insurance fund operations for one year, then resigned to run again for State Auditor, in the summer of 1938. Wright won a four-way primary and then prevailed in the November general election. This made Wright the youngest serving State Auditor in the nation at the time at age 29, and he became the second youngest statewide elected official in Idaho history.

=== Idaho State Auditor ===
Wright served as Idaho state auditor from 1939 to 1945, at that time serving as the youngest State Auditor in the nation. He was re-elected in 1940 and 1942. At that time Idaho had two-year terms for statewide offices.

Early in Wright's first term in office the 1939 Idaho Legislature enacted legislation setting up an office of State Comptroller and transferred many of the duties and staff from the State Auditor to this newly created office. The Comptroller would be appointed by the Governor.

Wright brought suit in Idaho District Court challenging the constitutionality of the act. After winning a judgement in his favor at the state District Court level in June 1939, the case was appealed to the Idaho Supreme Court. In a landmark decision handed down February 3, 1940, the case Wright v. Callahan (61 Idaho 167-183; 1940) found that the "... entire statute creating office of state comptroller (was) void for unconstitutionality of part, the essential purpose of which (was) to divest the state auditor of his constitutional powers and duties ..." The court also stated the "legislature may prescribe duties in addition to those prescribed by the Constitution, provided, those prescribed by the legislature do not conflict with the duties either expressly or impliedly prescribed by the Constitution. The Supreme Court also warned that “Furthermore, to permit the legislature to create an office and vest in the appointee the powers and duties conferred upon a constitutional officer, would be to permit the legislature to nullify the Constitution and reduce it to a mere scrap of paper.” The duties and staff of the State Comptroller were immediately returned to Wright's control following the Supreme Court decision.

Wright v. Callahan has been cited in nearly two-dozen other opinions in nine states over the past eight decades in cases involving state constitutional officers and their duties.

Following Wright's re-election in 1940, he persuaded the Idaho Legislature in its 1941 session to enact more than a dozen laws updating the powers and duties of the State Auditor position. The scope and depth of the changes was noted by Idaho Statesman political reporter John Corlett. "The three most important of the sixteen bills provided for the establishment of a modern bookkeeping system by creation of a general ledger, changed the fiscal year from Jan. 1 to July 1, and allotment of appropriations to state departments at six month intervals," wrote Corlett. The Legislature also repealed the 1939 Comptroller legislation that was found unconstitutional. With the authorities secured, Wright focused most of his second and third terms as State Auditor steering the set-up of a modern state accounting system, this in the face of losing staff to the growing war effort.

=== Gubernatorial Candidacy ===
Wright declined to run for a fourth term as State Auditor in 1944, expecting to be detailed to the postwar occupation of Germany. Wright then made a late entry into the Democratic Party primary as a candidate for Governor of Idaho. In a four-way primary Wright placed second with 10,003 votes or 31.8 percent of the total, finishing second to Charles C. Gossett with 12,557 votes or 39.8 percent. Gossett was elected governor in the November general election.

After several years in the private sector, Wright again ran for Governor of Idaho in 1950. He won the Democratic primary with 30,249 votes or 46.9 percent of the votes in a three-way primary, distancing former Governor Arnold Williams by 7,515 votes. Wright lost the general election to Len Jordan in November 107,642 to 97,150 or 52.5 to 47.7 percent.

=== Federal Service ===
In January 1951 Wright was appointed by President Harry S. Truman as the Idaho Director of the Internal Revenue Service. He received unanimous vote in the U.S. Senate with strong support of Henry Dworshak and Herman Welker, both GOP Senators from Idaho.

Wright was a popular public speaker and maintained a public profile unusual for a mid-level Federal official. His presentations often included praise of the taxpayer, "Almost everyone is honest about income tax returns, which is a tribute to the loyalty and patriotism of the American people."

In May 1969 Wright was directed by higher ups in the Treasury Department to open his Boise office of the IRS on a Saturday where he was met by then former U.S. Rep. George Hansen who traveled to Boise from Washington. D.C. to file several years of income tax returns that had not been submitted. Hansen had a pending USDA appointment and a routine background check by the FBI had found the omission. Hansen submitting the delinquent forms several years late was a secret until a 1976 story by Lewiston Morning Tribune reporter James E. Shelledy. That Wright was a confirming source to Shelledy, and that Wright was directed to open the office on a Saturday for Rep. Hansen, was not known until 1988 when Shelledy revealed in a newspaper column that Wright had confirmed other sources about Hansen, and was guaranteed confidentiality until he died.

Wright retired from the IRS post that he held for 22 years in 1973.

== Personal life ==
In retirement, Wright was appointed to the Idaho Soil Conservation Commission by Governor Cecil Andrus in 1973, the first non-farmer appointed to the Commission. He served until July 1978.

Wright served as campaign treasurer for the 1974 re-election campaign of US Senator Frank Church, presiding over what was at that time the largest single political fund raising event in state history held October 20, 1973 - the date of the Saturday Night Massacre - for Senator Church's re-election bid that featured Senate Majority Leader Mike Mansfield (D-MT).

In 1978 Wright was campaign treasurer for Idaho Governor John V. Evans when Evans sought election to a four-year term. Evans, Church and Wright were all graduates of Stanford University.

At the time of his death in July 1988, Idaho Governor Cecil Andrus paid tribute to Wright, saying, "Those who knew him well have lost a good friend, and Idaho has lost a man who cared deeply for his state and its government. I have known Cal Wright for as long as I have been involved in politics in Idaho and have always valued his counsel and friendship."

Calvin E. Wright married Gwendolyn Sathre in 1929, who gave birth to Thomas C. Wright on August 2, 1931. Thomas C. grew up to be the founder of The Wright Group, a prominent publisher of educational materials. Among the titles he published was the "Story Box", a reading series which pioneered the "whole language" approach to learning how to read. At one point, whole language materials were used in more than 200,000 classrooms nationwide. In 1994, the Wright Group was acquired by Chicago's Tribune Company for more than $100,000,000. Subsequently, Thomas C. Wright retired to devote himself to supporting philanthropic causes.

== Elections where Calvin Wright was a candidate ==
Information source: Martin, Boyd A. Idaho Voting Trends: Party Realignment and Percentage of Votes for Candidates, Parties, and Elections, 1890-1974. and "Parties Divide Honors in Tuesday Election". The Burley Herald. November 8, 1934. p.1, 4 (table).

=== 1934 ===
Cassia County Auditor, General Election, 1934
Party	Candidate	Votes	%
Democratic	Calvin E. Wright	2,309	58.4%
Republican	P.F. Wilson	1,643	41.6%
Total votes		3,952	100%
Democratic hold			

== Idaho State Auditor elections ==
=== 1936 ===
Idaho State Auditor Democratic Primary, 1936
Party	Candidate	Votes	%
Democratic	Harry C. Parsons	29,966	62.1%
Democratic	Calvin E. Wright	18,288	37.9%
Total votes		48,254	100%

=== 1938 ===
Idaho State Auditor Democratic Primary, 1938
Party	Candidate	Votes	%
Democratic	Calvin E. Wright	17,369	24.07%
Democratic	Karl B. Evans	16,743	23.20%
Democratic	Donald D. Stewart	13,907	19.27%
Democratic	Charles H. Davis	13,331	18.47%
Democratic	Bert H. Smith	10,818	14.99%
Total votes		72,168	100%

=== 1938 ===
Idaho State Auditor General General Election, 1938
Party	Candidate	Votes	%
Democratic	Calvin E. Wright	90,264	52.45%
Republican	Thomas F. Rogers	81,111	47.13%
National Progressives of America	Eliza Buckland	726	0.42%
Total votes		172,101	100%
Democratic hold			

=== 1940 ===
Idaho State Auditor General General Election, 1940
Party	Candidate	Votes	%
Democratic	Calvin E. Wright	128,928	57.03%
Republican	Thomas F. Rogers	97,160	42.97%
Total votes		226,088	100%
Democratic hold			

=== 1942 ===
Idaho State Auditor General General Election, 1942
Party	Candidate	Votes	%
Democratic	Calvin E. Wright	74,901	56.06%
Republican	C.L. Schoenhut	58,716	43.94%
Total votes		133,617	100%
Democratic hold			

== Idaho Gubernatorial elections ==
=== 1944 ===
Idaho Gubernatorial Democratic Primary, 1944
Party	Candidate	Votes	%
Democratic	Charles C. Gossett	12,557	39.84%
Democratic	Calvin E. Wright	10,003	31.73%
Democratic	George H. Curtis	7,399	23.47%
Democratic	Fred Porter	1,557	4.94%
Total votes		31,516	100%

=== 1950 ===
Idaho Gubernatorial Democratic Primary, 1950
Party	Candidate	Votes	%
Democratic	Calvin E. Wright	30,249	46.86%
Democratic	Arnold Williams	22,734	35.22%
Democratic	George Hersely	11,564	17.91%
Total votes		64,547	100%

=== 1950 ===
Idaho Gubernatorial General Election, 1950
Party	Candidate	Votes	%
Republican	Len Jordan	107,642	52.56%
Democratic	Calvin E. Wright	97,150	47.44%
Total votes		204,792	100%
Republican hold			

Political offices
Preceded by Harry C. Parsons	Idaho State Controller; 1939–1945	Succeeded by Ernest G. Hansen
Party political offices
Preceded by Arnold Williams	Democratic Party nominee, Governor of Idaho; 1950 (lost)	Succeeded by Clark Hamilton
