= Donald S. Whitehead =

American politician

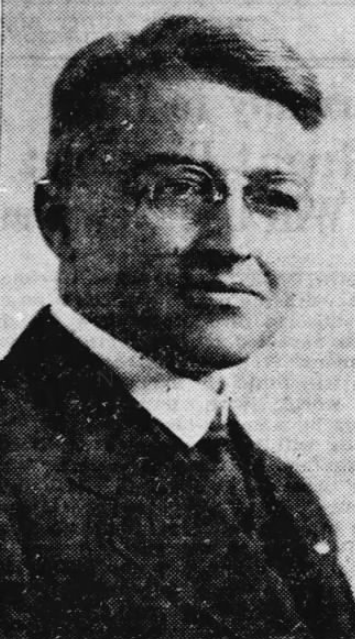
- Whitehead in 1926

23rd and 28th Lieutenant Governor of Idaho
- In office January 6, 1947 – January 1, 1951
- Governor: C. A. Robins
- Preceded by: A. R. McCabe
- Succeeded by: Edson Deal
- In office January 2, 1939 – January 6, 1941
- Governor: C. A. Bottolfsen
- Preceded by: Charles C. Gossett
- Succeeded by: Charles C. Gossett

Personal details
- Born: October 10, 1888 Three Oaks, Michigan, U.S.
- Died: January 2, 1957 (aged 68) Boise, Idaho, U.S.
- Party: Republican

Donald Strehle Whitehead (October 10, 1888 – January 2, 1957) was an American politician from Idaho. The state's 23rd and 28th lieutenant governor, he served a combined six years between 1939 and 1951.

== Early life ==
Whitehead was born on October 10, 1888, in Three Oaks, Michigan, to parents William Searing Whitehead and Louise M. Whitehead (nee Strehle). The family moved to Idaho when Whitehead was six months old.

Whitehead graduated Boise High School in 1904 and he graduated the University of Idaho in 1907.

He planned to become an engineer, but his father's illness forced him to return to the family business; In 1909, Whitehead became a druggist in Boise, and on November 17, 1909, he married Muriel G. Shaw.

== Political career ==
Whitehead began his political career in 1922, when he was elected to the Idaho House of Representatives. In 1929, he was elected Speaker of the House. Whitehead was first elected lieutenant governor in 1938 and served in the first administration of Governor C. A. Bottolfsen. He was elected again in 1946 and served a four-year term under Governor C. A. Robins. He previously served as speaker of the state's house of representatives.

In June 1947, Whitehead reported seeing a UFO in Boise. The same day, pilot Kenneth Arnold said he saw a similar object in the Cascades of Washington, near Mount Rainier; the reported sightings received national media coverage.

In 1950, Whitehead announced plans to run for governor; A heart attack led him to cancel those plans.

== Death ==
Whitehead died in 1957; At the time of his death, he was the only person to have served as both Speaker of the Idaho House and as Lt. Governor. Whitehead had been active in the local Episcopal cathedral and its Scottish Rite organization.

Political offices
Preceded by Charles C. Gossett	Lieutenant Governor of Idaho; January 2, 1939–January 6, 1941	Succeeded by Charles C. Gossett
Preceded by A. R. McCabe	Lieutenant Governor of Idaho; January 6, 1947–January 1, 1951	Succeeded by Edson Deal
