= Lieutenant Governor of Idaho =

Lieutenant governors of Idaho, List

- Great Seal of the State of Idaho

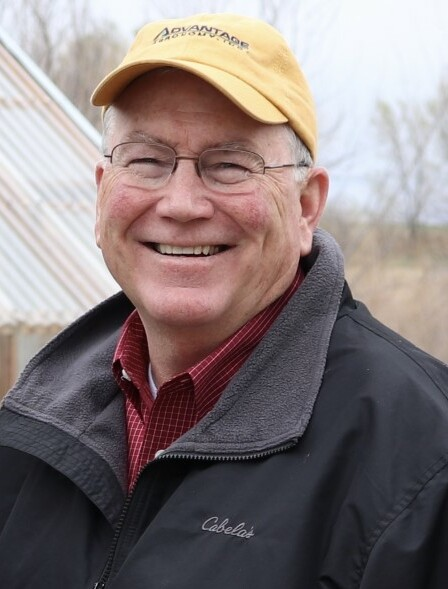
- Incumbent; Scott Bedke since January 2, 2023
- Government of Idaho
- Style: The Honorable
- Term length: Four years, no term limits
- Inaugural holder: N. B. Willey
- Succession: First
- Website: lgo.idaho.gov

The lieutenant governor of Idaho is a constitutional statewide elected office in the U.S. state of Idaho. According to the Idaho Constitution, the officeholder is elected to a four-year term.

The current lieutenant governor of Idaho is Republican Scott Bedke, who took office January 2, 2023.

== Powers and duties ==
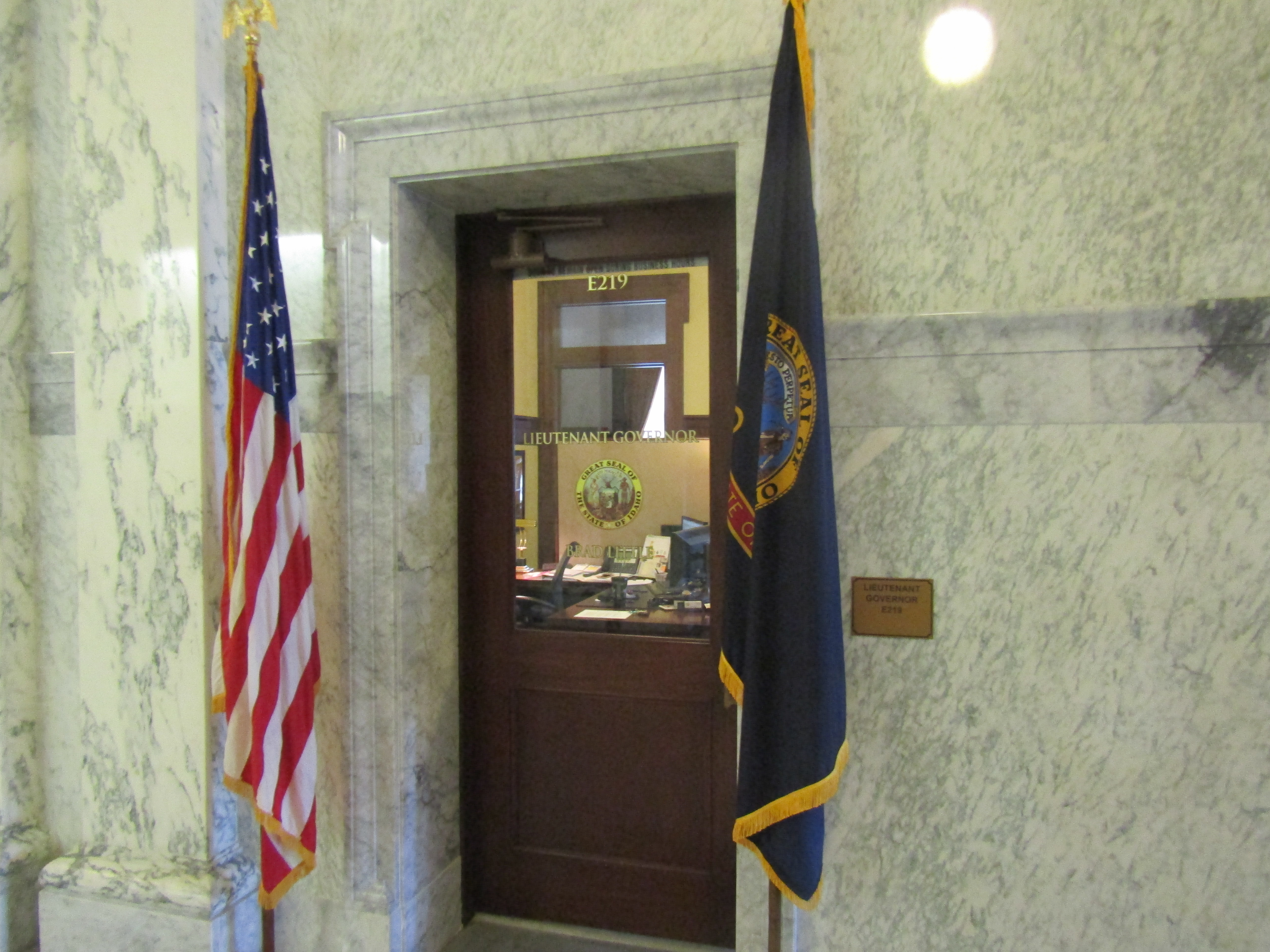
Office of the Idaho Lieutenant Governor

The power of the lieutenant governor of Idaho derives from Article IV, Sections 12 and 13 of the Idaho Constitution, which provides that the office is first in line of succession to the governor of Idaho.

It also dictates that the lieutenant governor serves as the presiding officer of the Idaho Senate. The lieutenant governorship has been a constitutional office in Idaho since statehood in 1890. Prior to 1946 the office was elected to two-year terms.

Idaho has had 43 lieutenant governors since 1890. Five people have served twice as Idaho Lieutenant Governor: O. E. Hailey (1927–1929; 1929–1931), G. P. Mix (1931–1933; 1935–1937), Charles C. Gossett (1937–1939; 1941–1943), Donald S. Whitehead (1939–1941; 1947–1951) and Jim Risch (2003–2006; 2007–2009).

== List of lieutenant governors of Idaho ==
#	Image	Name	Term of service	Political party
1		N. B. Willey	October 1890 – December 1890	Republican
2		John S. Gray (acting)	December 1890 – September 12, 1891	Republican
Office vacant: September 12, 1891 – January 2, 1893
3		F. B. Willis	January 2, 1893 – January 7, 1895	Republican
4		F. J. Mills	January 7, 1895 – January 4, 1897	Republican
5		George F. Moore	January 4, 1897 – January 2, 1899	Democratic, Populist
6		J. H. Hutchinson	January 2, 1899 – January 7, 1901	Silver Republican, Democratic
7		Thomas F. Terrell	January 7, 1901 – January 5, 1903	Democratic
8		James M. Stevens	January 5, 1903 – January 2, 1905	Republican
9		Burpee L. Steeves	January 2, 1905 – January 7, 1907	Republican
10		Ezra A. Burrell	January 7, 1907 – January 4, 1909	Republican
11		Lewis H. Sweetser	January 4, 1909 – January 6, 1913	Republican
12		Herman H. Taylor	January 6, 1913 – January 1, 1917	Republican
13		Ernest L. Parker	January 1, 1917 – January 6, 1919	Democratic
14		Charles C. Moore	January 6, 1919 – January 1, 1923	Republican
15		H. C. Baldridge	January 1, 1923 – January 3, 1927	Republican
16		O. E. Hailey	January 3, 1927 – January 7, 1929	Republican
17		W. B. Kinne	January 7, 1929 – September 30, 1929	Republican
Office vacant: September 30 – October 25, 1929
18		O. E. Hailey	October 25, 1929 – January 5, 1931	Republican
19		G. P. Mix	January 5, 1931 – January 2, 1933	Democratic
20		George E. Hill	January 2, 1933 – January 7, 1935	Democratic
21		G. P. Mix	January 7, 1935 – January 4, 1937	Democratic
22		Charles C. Gossett	January 4, 1937 – January 2, 1939	Democratic
23		Donald S. Whitehead	January 2, 1939 – January 6, 1941	Republican
24		Charles C. Gossett	January 6, 1941 – January 4, 1943	Democratic
25		Edwin Nelson	January 4, 1943 – January 1, 1945	Republican
26		Arnold Williams	January 1, 1945 – November 17, 1945	Democratic
Office vacant: November 17, 1945 – March 20, 1946
27		A. R. McCabe	March 20, 1946 – January 6, 1947	Democratic
28		Donald S. Whitehead	January 6, 1947 – January 1, 1951	Republican
29		Edson Deal	January 1, 1951 – January 3, 1955	Republicans
30		J. Berkeley Larsen	January 3, 1955 – January 5, 1959	Republican
31		William Drevlow	January 5, 1959 – January 2, 1967	Democratic
32		Jack M. Murphy	January 2, 1967 – January 6, 1975	Republican
33		John Evans	January 6, 1975 – January 24, 1977	Democratic
Office vacant: January 24–28, 1977
34		William J. Murphy	January 28, 1977 – January 1, 1979	Democratic
35		Phil Batt	January 1, 1979 – January 3, 1983	Republican
36		David Leroy	January 3, 1983 – January 5, 1987	Republican
37		Butch Otter	January 5, 1987 – January 3, 2001	Republican
Office vacant: January 3–30, 2001
38		Jack Riggs	January 30, 2001 – January 6, 2003	Republican
39		Jim Risch	January 6, 2003 – May 26, 2006	Republican
Office vacant: May 26 – June 15, 2006
40		Mark Ricks	June 15, 2006 – January 1, 2007	Republican
41		Jim Risch	January 1, 2007 – January 3, 2009	Republican
Office vacant: January 3–6, 2009
42		Brad Little	January 6, 2009 – January 7, 2019	Republican
43		Janice McGeachin	January 7, 2019 – January 2, 2023	Republican
44		Scott Bedke	January 2, 2023 – present	Republican

== Passages ==
Incumbent	Reason for vacancy	Appointed successor	Date of appointment	Elected successor	Date of election
N. B. Willey	Succeeded as Governor December 1890	John S. Gray	December 1890	F. B. Willis	November 8, 1892
W. B. Kinne	Died September 30, 1929	O. E. Hailey	October 25, 1929	G. P. Mix	November 4, 1930
Arnold Williams	Succeeded as Governor November 17, 1945	A. R. McCabe	March 20, 1946	Donald S. Whitehead	November 5, 1946
John Evans	Succeeded as Governor January 24, 1977	William J. Murphy	January 28, 1977	Phil Batt	November 7, 1978
Butch Otter	Resigned January 3, 2001	Jack Riggs	January 30, 2001	Jim Risch	November 5, 2002
Jim Risch	Succeeded as Governor May 26, 2006	Mark Ricks	June 15, 2006	Jim Risch	November 7, 2006
Jim Risch	Sworn into the United States Senate January 6, 2009	Brad Little	January 6, 2009	Brad Little	November 2, 2010

== See also ==
- Idaho gubernatorial elections
- List of governors of Idaho
