= Charles C. Gossett =

American politician (1888–1974)

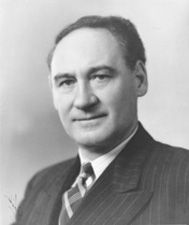

United States Senator from Idaho
- In office November 17, 1945 – November 6, 1946
- Appointed by: Arnold Williams
- Preceded by: John Thomas
- Succeeded by: Henry Dworshak

20th Governor of Idaho
- In office January 1, 1945 – November 17, 1945
- Lieutenant: Arnold Williams
- Preceded by: C. A. Bottolfsen
- Succeeded by: Arnold Williams

22nd and 24th Lieutenant Governor of Idaho
- In office January 6, 1941 – January 4, 1943
- Governor: Chase Clark
- Preceded by: Donald Whitehead
- Succeeded by: Edwin Nelson
- In office January 4, 1937 – January 2, 1939
- Governor: Barzilla Clark
- Preceded by: G. P. Mix
- Succeeded by: Donald Whitehead

Member of the Idaho House of Representatives
- In office 1933–1937

Personal details
- Born: Charles Clinton Gossett; September 2, 1888 Pricetown, Ohio, U.S.
- Died: September 20, 1974 (aged 86) Boise, Idaho, U.S.
- Resting place: Kohlerlawn Cemetery, Nampa, Idaho
- Party: Democratic
- Spouse(s): Clara Louise Fleming (1892–1967)
- Children: 3
- Profession: Agriculture

Charles Clinton Gossett (September 2, 1888 – September 20, 1974) was an American politician who served as the 20th governor of Idaho and a United States Senator from Idaho, but was in both offices less than a year in the 1940s. He was a member of the Democratic Party.

== Early life ==
Born in Pricetown, Ohio, Gossett attended public schools in Ohio. He moved west to Cunningham, Washington, in 1907, to Ontario, Oregon, in 1910, and finally to Nampa, Idaho, in 1922. He engaged in the agriculture, livestock, feed and shipping businesses.

== Career ==
In 1932, Gossett was elected to Idaho House of Representatives. In 1936, he was elected the 22nd Idaho lieutenant governor, serving for two years alongside Governor Barzilla Clark. Gossett returned as the 24th Idaho lieutenant governor under Governor Chase Clark, Barzilla Clark's younger brother, both elected in 1940.

Gossett was elected to the governorship in his own right in 1944, winning the June primary over Idaho State Auditor Calvin Wright and Idaho Secretary of State George Curtis, as well as the November general election over William Detweiler, the Republican nominee from Hazelton. This was the last election for a two-year term, but Gossett served less than a year; he resigned in November 1945 to let his successor, Lieutenant Governor Arnold Williams, appoint him to the United States Senate to succeed the late John Thomas.

In the special election for the seat in 1946, Gossett was defeated in the Democratic primary in June by State Senator George Donart, who in turn was defeated by Republican U.S. Representative Henry Dworshak in the general election in November. After the loss, Gossett returned to his former business pursuits.

Gossett attempted a political comeback in 1954 in a run for the governorship. At the time, self-succession (reelection) was not allowed; Len Jordan's term was ending. Gossett was defeated in the Democratic gubernatorial primary in August by State Senator Clark Hamilton, who in turn lost to Republican attorney general Robert Smylie in the general election. Gossett was appointed to the Idaho Tax Commission by Smylie in 1956 and served until 1967.

== Personal life ==
Gossett married Clara Louise Fleming on November 28, 1916, and they had three children.

Following an extended illness, Gossett died at age 86 in Boise on September 20, 1974, and is interred at Kohlerlawn Cemetery in Nampa.

Political offices
Preceded by G. P. Mix	Lieutenant Governor of Idaho; January 3, 1937 – January 2, 1939	Succeeded by Donald S. Whitehead
Preceded by Donald S. Whitehead	Lieutenant Governor of Idaho; January 3, 1941 – January 2, 1943	Succeeded by Edwin Nelson
Preceded by C. A. Bottolfsen	Governor of Idaho; January 1, 1945 – November 17, 1945	Succeeded by Arnold Williams
Party political offices
Preceded by Chase A. Clark	Democratic Party nominee, Governor of Idaho; 1944 (won)	Succeeded by Arnold Williams
U.S. Senate
Preceded by John Thomas	U.S. senator (Class 2) from Idaho; November 17, 1945 – November 6, 1946; Served alongside: Glen H. Taylor	Succeeded by Henry Dworshak
