= Idaho gubernatorial elections =

Idaho gubernatorial elections have been held since statehood in 1890 to directly elect the Governor of Idaho. After the initial election was held in October 1890, each subsequent election was held every two years in November until 1946. Elections after 1946 were held in November every four years.

== Results ==
Year	First	Second	Third	Fourth	Fifth
1890	George L. Shoup; Republican; 10,262; 56.35%	B. Wilson; Democratic; 7,948; 43.65%			
1892	William J. McConnell; Republican; 8,178; 40.21%	John M. Burke; Democratic; 6,769; 33.28%	Abraham J. Crook; Populist; 4,865; 24.23%	J. A. Clark; Prohibition; 264; 1.32%	
1894	William J. McConnell; Republican; 10,208; 41.51%	James W. Ballantine; Populist; 7,121; 28.96%	Edward A. Stevenson; Democratic; 7,057; 28.70%	Other candidates various 205; 0.83%	
1896	Frank Steunenberg; Democratic–Populist; 22,096; 76.79%	David H. Budlong; Republican; 6,441; 22.38%	Other candidates various 239; 0.83%		
1898	Frank Steunenberg; Democratic; 19,407; 48.83%	A. B. Moss; Republican; 13,794; 34.71%	J. H. Anderson; Populist; 5,371; 13.51%	Other candidates various 1,175; 2.96%	
1900	Frank W. Hunt; Democratic; 28,628; 50.78%	D. W. Standrod; Republican; 26,468; 46.95%	Other candidates various 1,227; 2.27%		
1902	John T. Morrison; Republican; 31,874; 52.90%	Frank W. Hunt; Democratic; 26,021; 43.18%	Other candidates various 2,362; 3.92%		
1904	Frank R. Gooding; Republican; 41,877; 58.74%	Henry Heitfeld; Democratic; 24,252; 34.02%	Theodore B. Shaw; Socialist; 4,000; 5.61%	Other candidates various 1,169; 1.64%	
1906	Frank R. Gooding; Republican; 38,386; 52.18%	Charles O. Stockslager; Democratic; 29,496; 40.09%	Thomas F. Kelley; Socialist; 4,650; 6.32%	Other candidates various 1,169; 1.64%	
1908	James H. Brady; Republican; 47,864; 49.61%	Moses Alexander; Democratic; 40,145; 41.61%	Ernest Unterman; Socialist; 6,155; 6.38%	Other candidates various 2,310; 2.39%	
1910	James H. Hawley; Democratic; 40,856; 47.42%	James H. Brady; Republican; 39,961; 46.38%	S. W. Motley; Socialist; 5,342; 6.20%		
1912	John M. Haines; Republican; 35,074; 33.24%	James H. Hawley; Democratic; 33,992; 32.22%	G. H. Martin; Progressive; 24,325; 23.05%	L. A. Coblentz; Socialist; 11,094; 10.51%	
1914	Moses Alexander; Democratic; 47,618; 44.13%	John M. Haines; Republican; 40,349; 37.39%	Hugh E. McElroy; Progressive; 10,583; 9.81%	L. A. Coblentz; Socialist; 7,967; 7.38%	
1916	Moses Alexander; Democratic; 63,877; 47.49%	D. W. Davis; Republican; 63,305; 47.07%	Annie E. Triplow; Socialist; 7,321; 5.44%		
1918	D. W. Davis; Republican; 57,626; 59.95%	H. F. Samuels; Democratic; 38,499; 40.05%			
1920	D. W. Davis; Republican; 75,748; 52.97%	Ted A. Walters; Democratic; 38,509; 26.93%	Sherman D. Fairchild; Independent; 28,752; 20.11%		
1922	Charles C. Moore; Republican; 50,538; 39.53%	H. F. Samuels; Progressive; 40,516; 31.69%	Moses Alexander; Democratic; 36,810; 28.79%		
1924	Charles C. Moore; Republican; 65,408; 43.91%	H. F. Samuels; Progressive; 58,163; 39.04%	A. L. Freehafer; Democratic; 25,081; 16.84%	Other candidates various 321; 0.22%	
1926	H. C. Baldridge; Republican; 61,575; 51.05%	W. Scott Hall; Progressive; 34,208; 28.36%	Asher B. Wilson; Democratic; 24,837; 20.59%		
1928	H. C. Baldridge; Republican; 87,681; 57.82%	C. Ben Ross; Democratic; 63,046; 41.58%	Other candidates various 908; 0.60%		
1930	C. Ben Ross; Democratic; 73,896; 56.03%	John McMurray; Republican; 58,002; 43.98%			
1932	C. Ben Ross; Democratic; 116,663; 61.73%	B. Defenbach; Republican; 68,863; 36.44%	Other candidates various 3,476; 1.84%		
1934	C. Ben Ross; Democratic; 93,313; 54.58%	Frank L. Stephan; Republican; 76,659; 44.25%	Other candidates various 2,001; 1.17%		
1936	Barzilla W. Clark; Democratic; 115,098; 57.19%	Frank L. Stephan; Republican; 83,430; 41.46%	Other candidates various 2,716; 1.35%		
1938	C. A. Bottolfsen; Republican; 106,268; 57.30%	C. Ben Ross; Democratic; 77,697; 41.89%	Other candidates various 1,494; 0.81%		
1940	Chase A. Clark; Democratic; 120,420; 50.48%	C. A. Bottolfsen; Republican; 118,117; 49.52%			
1942	C. A. Bottolfsen; Republican; 72,260; 50.15%	Chase A. Clark; Democratic; 71,826; 49.85%			
1944	Charles C. Gossett; Democratic; 109,527; 52.64%	W. H. Detweiler; Republican; 98,532; 47.36%			
1946	C. A. Robins; Republican; 102,233; 56.37%	Arnold Williams; Democratic; 79,131; 43.63%			
1950	Len Jordan; Republican; 107,642; 52.56%	Calvin Wright; Democratic; 97,150; 47.44%			
1954	Robert Smylie; Republican; 124,038; 54.24%	Clark Hamilton; Democratic; 104,647; 45.76%			
1958	Robert Smylie; Republican; 121,810; 50.96%	A. M. Derr; Democratic; 117,236; 49.04%			
1962	Robert Smylie; Republican; 139,578; 54.64%	Vernon Smith; Democratic; 115,876; 45.36%			
1966	Don Samuelson; Republican; 104,586; 41.40%	Cecil Andrus; Democratic; 93,744; 37.11%	Perry Swisher; Independent; 30,913; 12.24%	Phillip Jungert; Independent; 23,139; 9.16%	
1970	Cecil Andrus; Democratic; 128,004; 52.22%	Don Samuelson; Republican; 117,108; 47.78%			
1974	Cecil Andrus; Democratic; 184,142; 70.92%	Jack M. Murphy; Republican; 68,731; 26.47%	Nolan Victor; American; 6,759; 2.60%		
1978	John Evans; Democratic; 169,540; 58.75%	Allan Larsen; Republican; 114,149; 39.56%	Other candidates various 4,877; 1.69%		
1982	John Evans; Democratic; 187,640; 52.92%	Phil Batt; Republican; 166,911; 47.08%			
1986	Cecil Andrus; Democratic; 193,429; 49.93%	David Leroy; Republican; 189,794; 48.99%	James A. Miller; Independent; 4,203; 1.08%		
1990	Cecil Andrus; Democratic; 217,801; 68.13%	Roger Fairchild; Republican; 101,885; 31.87%			
1994	Phil Batt; Republican; 216,123; 51.05%	Larry EchoHawk; Democratic; 191,363; 45.20%	Ronald D. Rankin; Independent; 15,793; 3.73%		
1998	Dirk Kempthorne; Republican; 258,095; 67.69%	Robert Huntley; Democratic; 110,815; 29.06%	Peter Rickards; Independent; 12,388; 3.25%		
2002	Dirk Kempthorne; Republican; 231,566; 56.28%	Jerry Brady; Democratic; 171,711; 41.73%	Daniel L. J. Adams; Libertarian; 8,187; 1.99%		
2006	Butch Otter; Republican; 237,437; 52.67%	Jerry Brady; Democratic; 198,845; 44.11%	Marvin Richardson; Constitution; 7,309; 1.62%	Ted Dunlap; Libertarian; 7,241; 1.61%	
2010	Butch Otter; Republican; 267,483; 59.11%	Keith Allred; Democratic; 148,680; 32.85%	Jana Kemp; Independent; 26,655; 5.89%	Ted Dunlap; Libertarian; 5,867; 1.30%	Marvin Richardson; Independent; 3,850; 0.85%
2014	Butch Otter; Republican; 235,405; 53.52%	A.J. Balukoff; Democratic; 169,556; 38.55%	John Bujak; Libertarian; 17,884; 4.07%	Jill Humble; Independent; 8,801; 2.00%	
2018	Brad Little; Republican; 361,661; 59.76%	Paulette Jordan; Democratic; 231,081; 38.19%	Bev "Angel" Boeck; Libertarian; 6,551; 1.08%	Walter L. Hayes; Constitution; 5,787; 0.96%	
2022	Brad Little; Republican; 358,598; 60.52%	Stephen Heidt; Democratic; 120,160; 20.28%	Ammon Bundy; Independent; 101,835; 17.19%		

== See also ==
- List of governors of Idaho
- List of lieutenant governors of Idaho
- Elections in Idaho
