= Idaho Democratic Party =

Idaho affiliate of the Democratic Party

- Chairperson: Lauren Necochea
- Senate Minority Leader: Melissa Wintrow
- House Minority Leader: Ilana Rubel
- Founded: 1860s
- Headquarters: Boise, Idaho
- Membership (2025): ▼120,009
- National affiliation: Democratic Party
- Colors: Blue
- Seats in the United States Senate: 0 / 2
- Seats in the United States House of Representatives: 0 / 2
- Seats in the Idaho Senate: 6 / 35
- Seats in the Idaho House of Representatives: 9 / 70

Election symbol

Website
- www.idahodems.org

The Idaho Democratic Party is the affiliate of the Democratic Party in the U.S. state of Idaho.

While the party has been in the minority for most of the state's history, it has produced several notable public figures, including former U.S. senator Frank Church and former governor and secretary of the interior Cecil Andrus. Trade union support has traditionally been a key component of Democratic success in Idaho.

== History ==
Created in 1863 after the discovery of new mining territory, the early Idaho Territory was heavily populated by settlers from western Oregon, California and Nevada who supported a radical Republican agenda. However, towards the end of the Civil War, Idaho became flooded with Confederate refugees from states like Missouri who voted, like the miners in Idaho, heavily Democratic. The state became a Democratic stronghold for the next two decades.

At the dawn of statehood, despite ceding Idaho almost entirely four years earlier to the Populists and Republicans (Cleveland won only two popular votes in 1892), a fusion Populist/Democratic ticket behind William Jennings Bryan's candidacy won the state with 78.1% of the vote with the support from Silver Republicans. Nevertheless, the three-man congressional delegation remained two-part Populist, one-part Republican.

It was not until the turn of the century that Idaho saw its first Democratic representation in Congress, Senator Fred Dubois, U.S. Marshal of the Idaho Territory and a former Republican. He successfully campaigned on the disenfranchisement of Mormons on the grounds that they broke the law by practicing polygamy, already having barred them form holding office while he held office in the state legislature. Ironically, while his anti-Mormonism as a Republican kept Democrats out of office after 1882, his anti-Mormonism as a Democrat had the same result after 1902.

Though Democrats and Jewish governor Moses Alexander were able to implement a radically progressive agenda with the backing of the Nonpartisan League while in control during Woodrow Wilson's presidency, they quickly ceded power and it was not until Franklin Delano Roosevelt's 1932 landslide that they began to turn out state and local (as well as national) Republican office holders for a sustained period of time. That year, all three congressional Republicans up for re-election were defeated by Democratic challengers by at least 11 percent. All three challengers, like their state party, were stalwart supporters of FDR's New Deal. Despite a turn of opinion against the federal government's programs years later, Democrats retained two of their three newly attained seats for at least 15 years and managed to control the legislature for eight until the chambers evened themselves out during and immediately after the war.

=== Decline ===
In the post-war decades, as state politics was professionalized, Republicans dominated the state legislature and the governor's mansion, but Democrats maintained a steadfast presence across all other executive offices. A platform of environmental concerns gave Idaho its last Democratic governor to date even as it became more conservative in its congressional delegation and state legislature. However, in the 1970s and 1980s, Democrats lost two key voting groups. After the national party adopted a host of liberal social issues like abortion rights and feminism, Idaho's Mormons left the party in droves. Meanwhile, unions lost influence in already declining mining and timber industries.

Since 1994, when four-term Democratic governor Cecil Andrus retired and Representative Larry LaRocco was defeated, only one member of the party, Walt Minnick, has won either statewide office or election to Congress; after winning election to the latter capacity in 2008, Minnick was subsequently defeated for re-election by Republican Raúl Labrador two years later. Idaho Democrats currently seat only twelve members of the state House and six members of the state Senate, slightly worse than the ~20% they held in each chamber in 1996 when the party first collapsed. Unlike with other Mountain West states, such as Nevada and Colorado, immigration has not shifted Idaho leftward. Rather, Californians and other West Coast residents who have moved there have done so largely for cultural instead of economic reasons.

== Elected officials ==
=== Members of Congress ===
- None

=== Statewide offices ===
- None

=== Legislative leadership ===
- Senate Minority Leader: Melissa Wintrow
- Assistant Senate Minority Leader: James Ruchti
- Senate Minority Caucus Chair: Janie Ward– Engelking
- House Minority Leader: Ilana Rubel
- Assistant House Minority Leader: Lauren Necochea
- House Minority Caucus Chair: Ned Burns

=== Municipal ===
The following Democrats hold prominent mayoralties in Idaho:

- Boise: Lauren McLean (1)

== Chairs ==
- Lauren Necochea
- Deborah Silver
- Fred Cornworth
- Evangeline "Van" Beechler
- Bert Marley
- Larry Kenck
- R. Keith Roark
- Larry Grant
- Richard H. Stallings
- Carolyn Boyce
- Kathie Garrett
- Bill Mauk
- Mel Morgan
- A. K. Lienhart– Minnick
- Conley Ward, 1988–1991
- George Klein 1978
- John F. Greenfield 1976–77
- A. W. "Bill" Brunt 1952–1954
- John G. Walters 1958
- John Glasby
- George A. Greenfield 1954– 1955
- Gilbert Larsen ?–1952
- Ed P. Brennan 1949
- Dan J. Cavanagh 1947–1948
- David L. Bush 1944–1946
- Ben W. Davis 1939
- Ira H. Taylor 1937
- T. A. Walters 1931
- Edwin M. Holden 1930
- L. E. Dillingham 1925–1929
- Dr. W. R. Hamilton ?–1918
- Joseph T. Pence 1914
- Ben R. Gray 1912
- John F. Nugent
- Kirtland I. Perky 1900–1902
- George Ainslie 1890–1891
- Wayne P. Fuller 1979–1980

== Election results ==
=== Presidential ===
Idaho Democratic Party presidential election results
Election	Presidential Ticket	Votes	Vote %	Electoral votes	Result
1892	State party endorsed James B. Weaver/James G. Field (Populist)	N/A	N/A	0 / 3	Lost
1896	William Jennings Bryan/Arthur Sewall	23,135	78.10%	3 / 3	Won
1900	William Jennings Bryan/Adlai E. Stevenson	29,414	50.79%	3 / 3	Won
1904	Alton B. Parker/Henry G. Davis	18,480	25.46%	0 / 3	Lost
1908	William Jennings Bryan/John W. Kern	36,162	37.17%	0 / 3	Lost
1912	Woodrow Wilson/Thomas R. Marshall	33,921	32.08%	4 / 4	Won
1916	Woodrow Wilson/Thomas R. Marshall	70,054	52.04%	4 / 4	Won
1920	James M. Cox/Franklin D. Roosevelt	46,579	34.34%	0 / 4	Lost
1924	John W. Davis/Charles W. Bryan	24,256	16.36%	0 / 4	Lost
1928	Al Smith/Joseph T. Robinson	52,926	34.93%	0 / 4	Lost
1932	Franklin D. Roosevelt/John N. Garner	109,479	58.66%	4 / 4	Won
1936	Franklin D. Roosevelt/John N. Garner	125,683	62.96%	4 / 4	Won
1940	Franklin D. Roosevelt/Henry A. Wallace	127,842	54.36%	4 / 4	Won
1944	Franklin D. Roosevelt/Harry S. Truman	107,399	51.55%	4 / 4	Won
1948	Harry S. Truman/Alben W. Barkley	107,370	49.98%	4 / 4	Won
1952	Adlai Stevenson/John Sparkman	95,081	34.42%	0 / 4	Lost
1956	Adlai Stevenson/Estes Kefauver	105,868	38.78%	0 / 4	Lost
1960	John F. Kennedy/Lyndon B. Johnson	138,853	46.22%	0 / 4	Lost
1964	Lyndon B. Johnson/Hubert Humphrey	148,920	50.92%	4 / 4	Won
1968	Hubert Humphrey/Edmund Muskie	89,273	30.66%	0 / 4	Lost
1972	George McGovern/Sargent Shriver	80,826	26.04%	0 / 4	Lost
1976	Jimmy Carter/Walter Mondale	126,549	37.12%	0 / 4	Lost
1980	Jimmy Carter/Walter Mondale	110,192	25.19%	0 / 4	Lost
1984	Walter Mondale/Geraldine Ferraro	108,510	26.39%	0 / 4	Lost
1988	Michael Dukakis/Lloyd Bentsen	147,272	36.01%	0 / 4	Lost
1992	Bill Clinton/Al Gore	137,013	28.42%	0 / 4	Lost
1996	Bill Clinton/Al Gore	165,443	33.65%	0 / 4	Lost
2000	Al Gore/Joe Lieberman	138,637	27.64%	0 / 4	Lost
2004	John Kerry/John Edwards	181,098	30.26%	0 / 4	Lost
2008	Barack Obama/Joe Biden	236,440	35.91%	0 / 4	Lost
2012	Barack Obama/Joe Biden	212,787	32.40%	0 / 4	Lost
2016	Hillary Clinton/Tim Kaine	189,765	27.48%	0 / 4	Lost
2020	Joe Biden/Kamala Harris	287,021	33.07%	0 / 4	Lost
2024	Kamala Harris/Tim Walz	274,972	30.38%	0 / 4	Lost

=== Gubernatorial ===
Idaho Democratic Party gubernatorial election results
Election	Gubernatorial candidate	Votes	Vote %	Result
1890	Benjamin Wilson	7,948	43.65%	Lost ✗
1892	John M. Burke	6,769	33.72%	Lost ✗
1894	Edward A. Stevenson	7,057	28.70%	Lost ✗
1896	Frank Steunenberg	22,096	76.79%	Won ✓
1898	Frank Steunenberg	19,407	48.83%	Won ✓
1900	Frank W. Hunt	28,628	50.87%	Won ✓
1902	Frank W. Hunt	26,021	43.18%	Lost ✗
1904	Henry Heitfeld	24,252	34.02%	Lost ✗
1906	Charles Stockslager	29,496	40.09%	Lost ✗
1908	Moses Alexander	40,145	41.61%	Lost ✗
1910	James H. Hawley	40,856	47.42%	Won ✓
1912	James H. Hawley	33,992	32.22%	Lost ✗
1914	Moses Alexander	47,618	44.13%	Won ✓
1916	Moses Alexander	63,877	47.49%	Won ✓
1918	H. F. Samuels	38,499	40.05%	Lost ✗
1920	Ted A. Walters	38,509	26.93%	Lost ✗
1922	Moses Alexander	36,810	28.79%	Lost ✗
1924	A. L. Freehafer	25,081	16.82%	Lost ✗
1926	Asher B. Wilson	24,837	20.59%	Lost ✗
1928	C. Ben Ross	63,046	41.58%	Lost ✗
1930	C. Ben Ross	73,896	56.03%	Won ✓
1932	C. Ben Ross	116,663	61.73%	Won ✓
1934	C. Ben Ross	93,313	54.58%	Won ✓
1936	Barzilla W. Clark	115,098	57.19%	Won ✓
1938	C. Ben Ross	77,697	41.89%	Lost ✗
1940	Chase A. Clark	120,420	50.48%	Won ✓
1942	Chase A. Clark	71,826	49.85%	Lost ✗
1944	Charles C. Gossett	109,527	52.64%	Won ✓
1946	Arnold Williams	79,131	43.63%	Lost ✗
1950	Calvin E. Wright	97,150	47.44%	Lost ✗
1954	Clark Hamilton	104,647	45.76%	Lost ✗
1958	Alfred M. Derr	117,236	49.04%	Lost ✗
1962	Vernon K. Smith	115,876	45.36%	Lost ✗
1966	Cecil Andrus	93,744	37.11%	Lost ✗
1970	Cecil Andrus	128,004	52.22%	Won ✓
1974	Cecil Andrus	184,142	70.92%	Won ✓
1978	John Evans	169,540	58.75%	Won ✓
1982	John Evans	165,365	50.64%	Won ✓
1986	Cecil Andrus	193,429	49.9%	Won ✓
1990	Cecil Andrus	218,673	68.21%	Won ✓
1994	Larry Echo Hawk	181,363	43.88%	Lost ✗
1998	Robert C. Huntley	110,815	29.07%	Lost ✗
2002	Jerry Brady	171,711	41.73%	Lost ✗
2006	Jerry Brady	198,845	44.11%	Lost ✗
2010	Keith G. Allred	148,680	32.85%	Lost ✗
2014	A.J. Balukoff	169,556	38.55%	Lost ✗
2018	Paulette Jordan	231,081	38.19%	Lost ✗
2022	Stephen Heidt	120,160	20.28%	Lost ✗
2026	Terri Pickens	230,760	32.35%	Lost ✗

== See also ==
- Political party strength in Idaho
- Idaho Democratic caucuses, 2016
- Idaho Democratic caucuses, 2012
- Idaho Democratic caucuses, 2008
