= List of governors of Idaho =

Governor of Idaho
- Great Seal of the State of Idaho

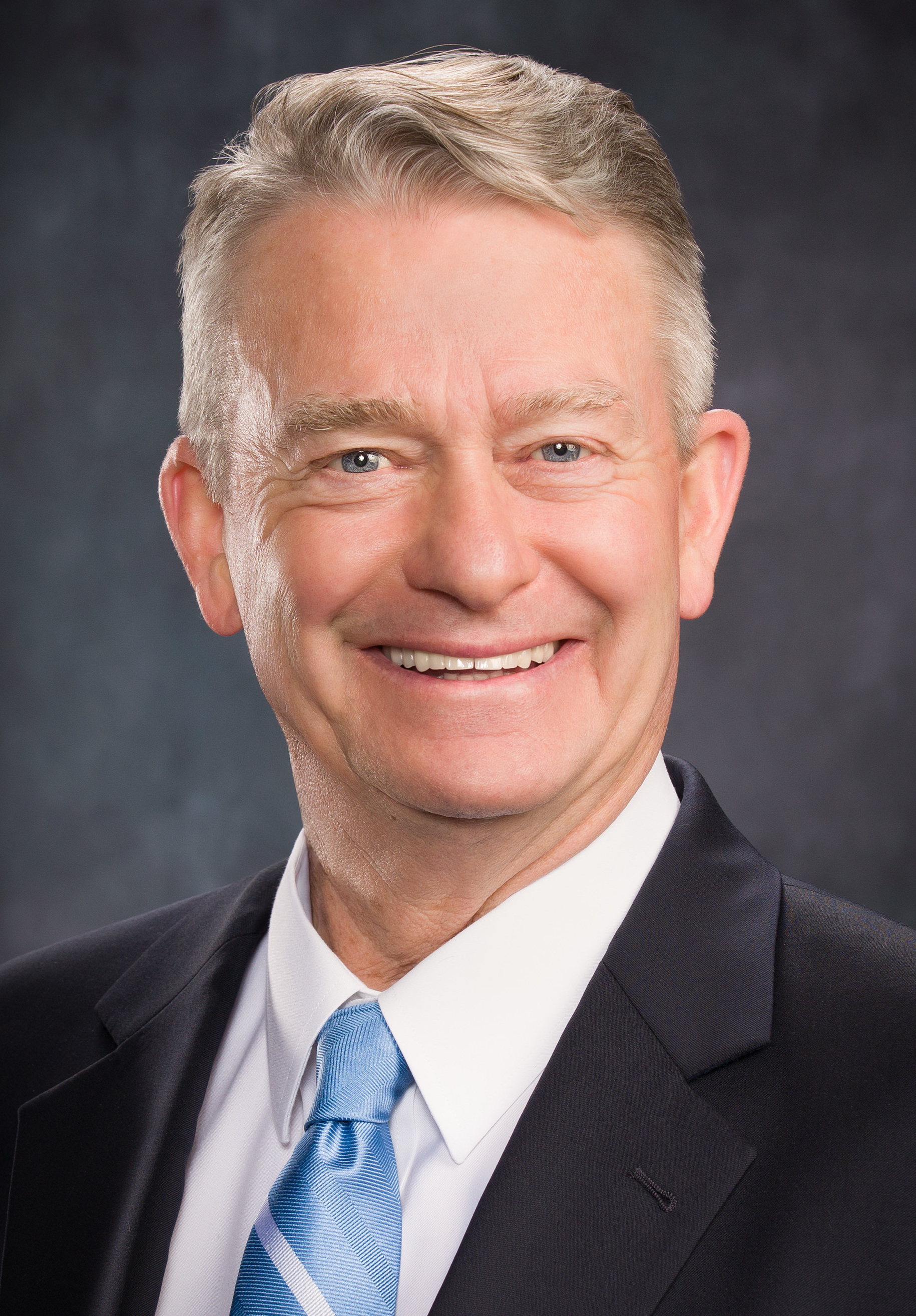
- Incumbent; Brad Little since January 7, 2019
- Government of Idaho
- Residence: None
- Term length: Four years, no term limit
- Inaugural holder: George L. Shoup
- Formation: October 1, 1890
- Succession: Line of succession
- Deputy: Lieutenant Governor of Idaho
- Salary: $138,302 (2022)
- Website: gov.idaho.gov

The governor of Idaho is the head of government of Idaho and commander-in-chief of the state's military forces. The officeholder has the duty to see state laws are executed, power to either approve or veto bills passed by the Idaho Legislature. The current governor of Idaho is Brad Little, a Republican, who took office on January 7, 2019.

Thirty-one individuals have held the office of governor of Idaho since the state's admission to the Union in 1890, two of whom served non-consecutive terms. The state's first governor, George L. Shoup, had the shortest term, of three months; Cecil Andrus had the longest, of 14 years.

== List of governors ==
=== Territory of Idaho ===
Idaho Territory was created from Dakota Territory, Nebraska Territory, and Washington Territory on March 4, 1863.

There were sixteen territorial governors appointed by the president of the United States from the territory's organization in 1863 until the formation of the state of Idaho in 1890. Due to the long distance from Washington, D.C. to Boise, there was often a lengthy gap between a governor being appointed and his arrival in the territory; three resigned before even arriving.

Governors of the Territory of Idaho
No.	Governor	Term in office (Note: The range given is from the date the governor was confirmed by the Senate, or appointed by the President during a Senate recess, to the date the governor's successor was confirmed, unless noted.)	Appointed by
1	William H. Wallace (1811–1879)	March 10, 1863 (Note: Wallace was nominated on March 7, 1863, confirmed by the Senate on March 10, and took office in July.) – February 26, 1864 (354 days; replaced) (Note: Wallace had been elected to the United States House of Representatives; one source says he resigned in December 1863, whereas contemporary press was labeling him as sitting governor until at least February 6, 1864.)	Abraham Lincoln
2	Caleb Lyon (1822–1875)	February 26, 1864 (Note: Lyon was nominated on February 2, 1864, confirmed by the Senate on February 26, and arrived in the territory some six months later.) – April 10, 1866 (775 days; replaced)	Abraham Lincoln
3	David W. Ballard (1824–1883)	April 10, 1866 (Note: Ballard was nominated on March 14, 1866, confirmed by the Senate on April 10, and arrived in the territory in June.) – March 30, 1870 (1451 days; replaced) (Note: Ballard stayed on in office until July 16, when he delivered a farewell address to the territory.)	Andrew Johnson
—	Samuel Bard (1825–1878)	March 30, 1870 – June 5, 1870 (68 days; resigned before taking office) (Note: Bard was nominated on February 8, 1870, and confirmed by the Senate on March 30. However, he resigned on June 5 to continue being a journalist in Georgia, having never reached the territory.)	Ulysses S. Grant
—	Gilman Marston (1811–1890)	June 7, 1870 – December 3, 1870 (180 days; resigned before taking office) (Note: Marston was nominated on May 27, 1870, and confirmed on June 7. However, he resigned on December 3, due to the delay, through it was rumored that he was unhappy with the salary.)	Ulysses S. Grant
—	Alexander H. Conner (1831–1891)	January 12, 1871 – March 3, 1871 (51 days; resigned before taking office) (Note: Conner was nominated on December 16, 1870, and confirmed by the Senate on January 12, 1871. However, he declined the appointment; it is unknown when, though Limbaugh writes that he "declined the offer as soon as it was made," and news reported it was on or just before March 3.)	Ulysses S. Grant
4	Thomas M. Bowen (1835–1906)	April 19, 1871 (Note: Bowen was nominated on April 18, 1871, in place of Ebenezer Dumont, who was nominated on March 17 but died on April 16, before the Senate could confirm him. The Senate Executive Journal has no record of if or when the Senate confirmed Bowen, but some sources say it was on April 19. He took office on July 7.) – September 30, 1871 (165 days; resigned) (Note: Bowen submitted his resignation on September 15, to take effect September 30. Upon arriving in Idaho, Bowen reportedly did not like the look of the landscape, so he decided to stay only a few weeks.)	Ulysses S. Grant
5	Thomas W. Bennett (1831–1893)	October 24, 1871 (Note: Bennett was nominated on December 6, 1871, and confirmed by the Senate on December 14. However, sources say he took office on October 24, implying a recess appointment.) – December 4, 1875 (1503 days; resigned) (Note: Bennett resigned, having been elected to the United States House of Representatives. His term in the House started on March 4, and he had held both offices for nine months.)	Ulysses S. Grant
6	David P. Thompson (1834–1901)	December 16, 1875 (Note: Thompson was nominated on December 15, 1875, confirmed by the Senate on December 16, and took office on April 6, 1876.) – July 1, 1876 (199 days; resigned) (Note: Thompson resigned due to a conflict of interest as a federal officer holding government contracts. Limbaugh says he resigned upon learning that this was not allowed. He submitted his resignation on July 1, to take effect when his successor was confirmed.)	Ulysses S. Grant
7	Mason Brayman (1813–1895)	July 24, 1876 (Note: Thomas W. Bennett was nominated on July 17, 1876. However, Bennett declined, so Brayman was nominated on July 18, confirmed by the Senate on July 24. and he took office on August 1.) – July 12, 1880 (1450 days; replaced) (Note: Many petitions were filed to remove Brayman, and President Hayes responded by nominating John Philo Hoyt on June 11, 1878, though he declined the appointment. Brayman was allowed to serve out the remainder of his term.)	Ulysses S. Grant
8	John Baldwin Neil (1842–1902)	July 12, 1880 (Note: Neil was appointed on July 12, 1880, during a Senate recess; nominated on December 7; and confirmed by the Senate on December 14. He took office on August 4.) – March 2, 1883 (964 days; replaced)	Rutherford B. Hayes
9	John N. Irwin (1844–1905)	March 2, 1883 (Note: Irwin was nominated on March 1, 1883, confirmed by the Senate on March 2, and arrived in Boise on April 24.) – December 20, 1883 (294 days; resigned) (Note: Irwin took a leave of absence on May 15, and resigned on December 20 for personal reasons, and returned his salary for the period he was absent.)	Chester A. Arthur
10	William M. Bunn (1842–1923)	March 26, 1884 (Note: Bunn was nominated on March 4, 1884, confirmed by the Senate on March 26, and took office on June 26.) – July 3, 1885 (465 days; resigned) (Note: Bunn resigned, citing personal reasons.)	Chester A. Arthur
11	Edward A. Stevenson (1831–1895)	September 29, 1885 (Note: Stevenson was appointed on September 29, 1885, during a Senate recess; nominated on December 10, 1885; and confirmed by the Senate on February 3, 1886.) – April 1, 1889 (1281 days; replaced)	Grover Cleveland
12	George L. Shoup (1836–1904)	April 1, 1889 (Note: Shoup was nominated on March 29, 1889, confirmed on April 1, and took office on April 30.) – December 8, 1890 (617 days; elected state governor)	Benjamin Harrison

=== State of Idaho ===
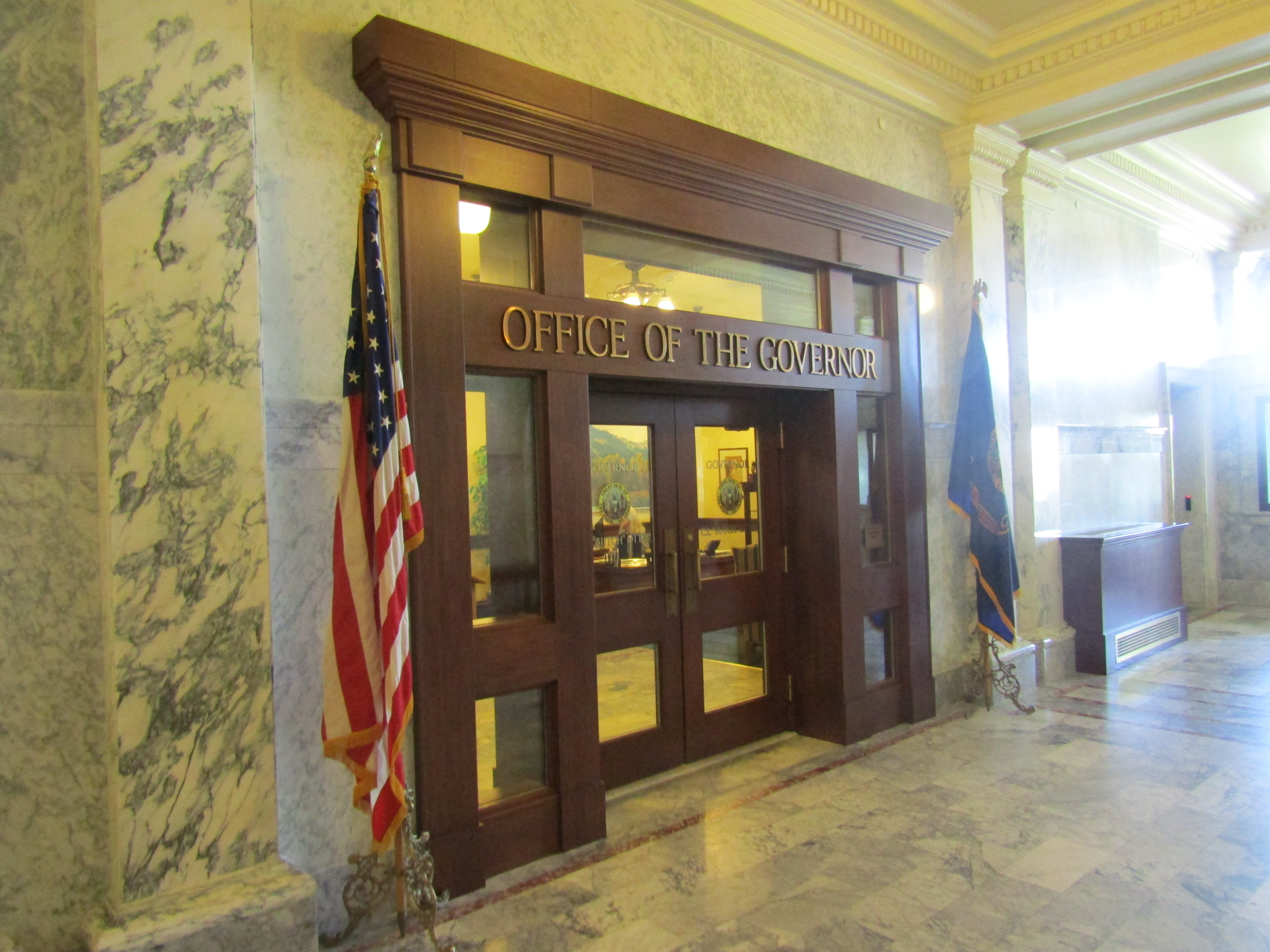
Office of the Idaho governor

Idaho was admitted to the Union on July 3, 1890. The terms for governor and lieutenant governor are 4 years, commencing on the first Monday in the January following the election. Prior to 1946, the offices were elected to terms of two years. If the office of governor is vacant or the governor is out of state or unable to discharge his duties, the lieutenant governor acts as governor until such time as the disability is removed. If both the offices of governor and lieutenant governor are vacant or both those officers are unable to fulfill their duties, the President pro tempore of the Idaho Senate is next in line, and then the Speaker of the Idaho House of Representatives. After the change to four-year terms, self-succession (reelection) was not initially allowed; newly elected Governor Robert E. Smylie, formerly the state's attorney general, successfully lobbied the 1955 legislature to propose an amendment to the state constitution to allow gubernatorial reelection, which was approved by voters in 1956. There is no limit to the number of terms a governor may serve. The governor and the lieutenant governor are elected at the same time but not on the same ticket.

Governors of the State of Idaho
No.	Governor	Term in office	Party	Election	Lt. Governor (Note: Lieutenant governors represented the same party as their governor unless noted.)
1	George L. Shoup (1836–1904)	December 8, 1890 (Note: Shoup was elected governor on October 1; as he was already territorial governor, some sources list this as when he took office, while others say he took office when the first legislature convened on December 8.) – December 19, 1890 (12 days; resigned) (Note: Shoup resigned, having been elected to the United States Senate.)	Republican	1890	N. B. Willey
2	N. B. Willey (1838–1921)	December 19, 1890 – January 2, 1893 (746 days; lost nomination)	Republican	Succeeded from lieutenant governor	John S. Gray
3	William J. McConnell (1839–1925)	January 2, 1893 – January 4, 1897 (1464 days; retired)	Republican	1892	F. B. Willis
3	William J. McConnell (1839–1925)	January 2, 1893 – January 4, 1897 (1464 days; retired)	Republican	1894	F. J. Mills
4	Frank Steunenberg (1861–1905)	January 4, 1897 – January 7, 1901 (1464 days; retired)	Democratic (Note: Steunenberg ran on a fusion ticket in 1896 with the Democratic, Populist, and Silver Republican parties, and in 1898 with the Democratic and Silver Republican parties.)	1896	George F. Moore
4	Frank Steunenberg (1861–1905)	January 4, 1897 – January 7, 1901 (1464 days; retired)	Democratic	1898	J. H. Hutchinson
5	Frank W. Hunt (1861–1906)	January 7, 1901 – January 5, 1903 (729 days; lost election)	Democratic (Note: Hunt ran on an electoral fusion ticket with two other parties, who were holding their nominating convention at the same time and place as the Democrats.)	1900	Thomas F. Terrell
6	John T. Morrison (1860–1915)	January 5, 1903 – January 2, 1905 (729 days; lost nomination)	Republican	1902	James M. Stevens
7	Frank R. Gooding (1859–1928)	January 2, 1905 – January 4, 1909 (1464 days; retired)	Republican	1904	Burpee L. Steeves
7	Frank R. Gooding (1859–1928)	January 2, 1905 – January 4, 1909 (1464 days; retired)	Republican	1906	Ezra A. Burrell
8	James H. Brady (1862–1918)	January 4, 1909 – January 2, 1911 (729 days; lost election)	Republican	1908	Lewis H. Sweetser
9	James H. Hawley (1847–1929)	January 2, 1911 – January 6, 1913 (736 days; lost election)	Democratic	1910	Lewis H. Sweetser
10	John M. Haines (1863–1917)	January 6, 1913 – January 4, 1915 (729 days; lost election)	Republican	1912	Herman H. Taylor (Note: Represented the Republican Party)
11	Moses Alexander (1853–1932)	January 4, 1915 – January 6, 1919 (1464 days; retired)	Democratic	1914	Herman H. Taylor
11	Moses Alexander (1853–1932)	January 4, 1915 – January 6, 1919 (1464 days; retired)	Democratic	1916	Ernest L. Parker
12	D. W. Davis (1873–1959)	January 6, 1919 – January 1, 1923 (1457 days; retired)	Republican	1918	Charles C. Moore
12	D. W. Davis (1873–1959)	January 6, 1919 – January 1, 1923 (1457 days; retired)	Republican	1920	Charles C. Moore
13	Charles C. Moore (1866–1958)	January 1, 1923 – January 3, 1927 (1464 days; retired)	Republican	1922	H. C. Baldridge
13	Charles C. Moore (1866–1958)	January 1, 1923 – January 3, 1927 (1464 days; retired)	Republican	1924	H. C. Baldridge
14	H. C. Baldridge (1868–1947)	January 3, 1927 – January 5, 1931 (1464 days; retired)	Republican	1926	Oscar Hailey
14	H. C. Baldridge (1868–1947)	January 3, 1927 – January 5, 1931 (1464 days; retired)	Republican	1928	W. B. Kinne (died October 1, 1929)
14	H. C. Baldridge (1868–1947)	January 3, 1927 – January 5, 1931 (1464 days; retired)	Republican	1928	Vacant
14	H. C. Baldridge (1868–1947)	January 3, 1927 – January 5, 1931 (1464 days; retired)	Republican	1928	Oscar Hailey (appointed October 25, 1929)
15	C. Ben Ross (1876–1946)	January 5, 1931 – January 4, 1937 (2192 days; retired) (Note: Ross instead ran unsuccessfully for the United States Senate.)	Democratic	1930	G. P. Mix
15	C. Ben Ross (1876–1946)	January 5, 1931 – January 4, 1937 (2192 days; retired)	Democratic	1932	George Hill
15	C. Ben Ross (1876–1946)	January 5, 1931 – January 4, 1937 (2192 days; retired)	Democratic	1934	G. P. Mix
16	Barzilla W. Clark (1880–1943)	January 4, 1937 – January 2, 1939 (729 days; lost nomination) (Note: Clark lost the Democratic nomination to C. Ben Ross.)	Democratic	1936	Charles C. Gossett
17	C. A. Bottolfsen (1890–1964)	January 2, 1939 – January 6, 1941 (736 days; lost election)	Republican	1938	Donald S. Whitehead
18	Chase Clark (1883–1966)	January 6, 1941 – January 4, 1943 (729 days; lost election)	Democratic	1940	Charles C. Gossett
19	C. A. Bottolfsen (1890–1964)	January 4, 1943 – January 1, 1945 (729 days; retired) (Note: Bottolfsen instead ran unsuccessfully for the United States Senate.)	Republican	1942	Edwin Nelson
20	Charles C. Gossett (1888–1974)	January 1, 1945 – November 17, 1945 (321 days; resigned) (Note: Gossett resigned to let Lieutenant Governor Williams succeed him and then appoint him to the United States Senate.)	Democratic	1944	Arnold Williams
21	Arnold Williams (1898–1970)	November 17, 1945 – January 6, 1947 (416 days; lost election)	Democratic	Succeeded from lieutenant governor	Vacant
21	Arnold Williams (1898–1970)	November 17, 1945 – January 6, 1947 (416 days; lost election)	Democratic	Succeeded from lieutenant governor	A. R. McCabe (appointed March 20, 1946)
22	C. A. Robins (1884–1970)	January 6, 1947 – January 1, 1951 (1457 days; term-limited) (Note: Robins, being term-limited, (Note: Under a 1944 amendment to the constitution, governors could not succeed themselves.) had already lost the Republican nomination for the United States Senate when his term ended.)	Republican	1946 (Note: First term under a constitution amendment which lengthened terms to four years.)	Donald S. Whitehead
23	Len Jordan (1899–1983)	January 1, 1951 – January 3, 1955 (1464 days; term-limited)	Republican	1950	Edson Deal
24	Robert E. Smylie (1914–2004)	January 3, 1955 – January 2, 1967 (4383 days; lost nomination)	Republican	1954	J. Berkeley Larsen
24	Robert E. Smylie (1914–2004)	January 3, 1955 – January 2, 1967 (4383 days; lost nomination)	Republican	1958	William Drevlow (Note: Represented the Democratic Party)
24	Robert E. Smylie (1914–2004)	January 3, 1955 – January 2, 1967 (4383 days; lost nomination)	Republican	1962	William Drevlow
25	Don Samuelson (1913–2000)	January 2, 1967 – January 4, 1971 (1464 days; lost election)	Republican	1966	Jack M. Murphy
26	Cecil Andrus (1931–2017)	January 4, 1971 – January 24, 1977 (2213 days; resigned) (Note: Andrus resigned, having been confirmed as United States Secretary of the Interior.)	Democratic	1970	Jack M. Murphy
26	Cecil Andrus (1931–2017)	January 4, 1971 – January 24, 1977 (2213 days; resigned)	Democratic	1974	John Evans
27	John Evans (1925–2014)	January 24, 1977 – January 5, 1987 (3634 days; retired) (Note: Evans instead ran unsuccessfully for the United States Senate.)	Democratic	Succeeded from lieutenant governor	Vacant
27	John Evans (1925–2014)	January 24, 1977 – January 5, 1987 (3634 days; retired)	Democratic	Succeeded from lieutenant governor	William J. Murphy (appointed January 28, 1977)
27	John Evans (1925–2014)	January 24, 1977 – January 5, 1987 (3634 days; retired)	Democratic	1978	Phil Batt
27	John Evans (1925–2014)	January 24, 1977 – January 5, 1987 (3634 days; retired)	Democratic	1982	David Leroy
28	Cecil Andrus (1931–2017)	January 5, 1987 – January 2, 1995 (2920 days; retired)	Democratic	1986	Butch Otter (resigned January 3, 2001)
28	Cecil Andrus (1931–2017)	January 5, 1987 – January 2, 1995 (2920 days; retired)	Democratic	1990	Butch Otter (resigned January 3, 2001)
29	Phil Batt (1927–2023)	January 2, 1995 – January 4, 1999 (1464 days; retired)	Republican	1994	Butch Otter (resigned January 3, 2001)
30	Dirk Kempthorne (1951–2026)	January 4, 1999 – May 26, 2006 (2700 days; resigned) (Note: Kempthorne resigned, having been confirmed as United States Secretary of the Interior.)	Republican	1998	Butch Otter (resigned January 3, 2001)
30	Dirk Kempthorne (1951–2026)	January 4, 1999 – May 26, 2006 (2700 days; resigned)	Republican	1998	Vacant
30	Dirk Kempthorne (1951–2026)	January 4, 1999 – May 26, 2006 (2700 days; resigned)	Republican	1998	Jack Riggs (appointed January 30, 2001)
30	Dirk Kempthorne (1951–2026)	January 4, 1999 – May 26, 2006 (2700 days; resigned)	Republican	2002	Jim Risch
31	Jim Risch (b. 1943)	May 26, 2006 – January 1, 2007 (221 days; retired) (Note: Risch was instead elected lieutenant governor, having won the Republican nomination before Kempthorne's resignation.)	Republican	Succeeded from lieutenant governor	Vacant
31	Jim Risch (b. 1943)	May 26, 2006 – January 1, 2007 (221 days; retired)	Republican	Succeeded from lieutenant governor	Mark Ricks (appointed June 15, 2006)
32	Butch Otter (b. 1942)	January 1, 2007 (Note: Otter took the oath of office ahead of time, to take effect at 12:01am on January 1.) – January 7, 2019 (4390 days; retired)	Republican	2006	Jim Risch (resigned January 3, 2009)
32	Butch Otter (b. 1942)	January 1, 2007 – January 7, 2019 (4390 days; retired)	Republican	2006	Vacant
32	Butch Otter (b. 1942)	January 1, 2007 – January 7, 2019 (4390 days; retired)	Republican	2006	Brad Little (appointed January 6, 2009)
32	Butch Otter (b. 1942)	January 1, 2007 – January 7, 2019 (4390 days; retired)	Republican	2010	Brad Little (appointed January 6, 2009)
32	Butch Otter (b. 1942)	January 1, 2007 – January 7, 2019 (4390 days; retired)	Republican	2014	Brad Little (appointed January 6, 2009)
33	Brad Little (b. 1954)	January 7, 2019 – Incumbent (Note: Little's second term began on January 6, 2023, and will expire on January 4, 2027; he was elected to a third term on November 3, 2026.) (in office 2877 days)	Republican	2018	Janice McGeachin
33	Brad Little (b. 1954)	January 7, 2019 – Incumbent (in office 2877 days)	Republican	2022	Scott Bedke
33	Brad Little (b. 1954)	January 7, 2019 – Incumbent (in office 2877 days)	Republican	2026	Scott Bedke

== Timeline ==
Timeline of Idaho governors

== Electoral history (1950–) ==
Year	Democratic nominee			Republican nominee			Independent candidate			Libertarian nominee			Constitution nominee			Other candidate		
Year	Candidate	#	%	Candidate	#	%	Candidate	#	%	Candidate	#	%	Candidate	#	%	Candidate	#	%
1950	Calvin E. Wright	97,150	47.44%	Len Jordan	107,642	52.56%	–			–			–			–		
1954	Clark Hamilton	104,647	45.76%	Robert E. Smylie	124,038	54.24%	–			–			–			–		
1958	Alfred M. Derr	117,236	49.04%	Robert E. Smylie	121,810	50.96%	–			–			–			–		
1962	Vernon K. Smith	115,876	45.36%	Robert E. Smylie	139,578	54.64%	–			–			–					
1966	Cecil Andrus	93,744	37.11%	Don Samuelson	104,586	41.41%	Perry Swisher	30,913	12.24%	–			–			Philip Jungert (Independent)	23,139	9.16%
1970	Cecil Andrus	128,004	52.22%	Don Samuelson	117,108	47.78%	–			–			–			–		
1974	Cecil Andrus	184,142	70.92%	Jack M. Murphy	68,731	26.47%	–			–			–			Nolan Victor (American)	6,759	2.60%
1978	John Evans	169,540	58.75%	Allan Larsen	114,149	39.56%	–			–			–			Wayne Loveless (American)	4,877	1.69%
1982	John Evans	165,365	50.64%	Phil Batt	161,157	49.36%	–			–			–			–		
1986	Cecil Andrus	193,429	49.93%	David Leroy	189,794	48.99%	James Miller	4,203	1.08%	–			–			–		
1990	Cecil Andrus	218,673	68.21%	Roger Fairchild	101,937	31.79%	–			–			–			–		
1994	Larry Echo Hawk	181,363	43.88%	Phil Batt	216,123	52.29%	Ronald D. Rankin	15,793	3.82%	–			–			–		
1998	Robert C. Huntley	110,815	29.07%	Dirk Kempthorne	258,095	67.70%	Peter Rickards	12,338	3.24%	–			–			–		
2002	Jerry Brady	171,711	41.73%	Dirk Kempthorne	231,566	56.28%	–			Daniel L.J. Adams	8,187	1.99%	–			–		
2006	Jerry Brady	198,845	44.11%	Butch Otter	237,437	52.67%	–			Ted Dunlap	7,241	1.61%	Marvin Richardson	7,309	1.62%	–		
2010	Keith G. Allred	148,680	32.85%	Butch Otter	267,483	59.11%	Jana Kemp	26,655	5.89%	Ted Dunlap	5,867	1.30%	–			Pro-Life (Independent)	3,850	0.85%
2014	A.J. Balukoff	169,556	38.55%	Butch Otter	235,405	53.52%	Jill Humble	8,801	2.00%	John Bujak	17,884	4.07%	Steve Pankey	5,219	1.19%	Pro-Life (Independent)	2,870	0.65%
2018	Paulette Jordan	231,081	38.19%	Brad Little	361,661	59.77%	–			Bev Boeck	6,551	1.08%	Walter Bayes	5,787	0.96%	–		
2022	Stephen Heidt	120,160	20.28%	Brad Little	358,598	60.51%	Ammon Bundy	101,835	17.18%	Paul Sand	6,714	1.13%	Chantyrose Davison	5,250	0.89%	–		

== See also ==
- Gubernatorial lines of succession in the United States § Idaho
- First ladies of Idaho
- Lieutenant Governor of Idaho
- List of Idaho state legislatures

== Sources ==
- "Former Governors of Idaho". National Governors Association.
- "Past Governors (1890 through present)". Governor of Idaho.
- "Idaho Constitution". State Democracy Research Initiative. University of Wisconsin Law School.
- Glashan, Roy R. (1979). American Governors and Gubernatorial Elections, 1775-1978. Meckler Books. ISBN 0-7201-1511-6 – via Internet Archive.
- Kallenbach, Joseph E.; Kallenbach, Jessamine S. (1977). American State Governors, 1776-1976. Oceana Publications. ISBN 978-0-379-00665-0 – via Internet Archive.
- McMullin, Thomas A.; Walker, David (1984). Biographical Directory of American Territorial Governors. Meckler Publishing. ISBN 0-930466-11-X – via Internet Archive.
- Mullaney, Marie Marmo (1994). Biographical Directory of the Governors of the United States, 1988–1994. Greenwood Publishing Group. ISBN 0-313-28312-5 – via Internet Archive.
- Sobel, Robert; Raimo, John (1978). Biographical Directory of the Governors of the United States, 1789-1978. Vol. 1. Meckler Books. ISBN 0-930466-01-2 – via Internet Archive.
- Thorpe, Francis Newton, ed. (1909). The Federal and State Constitutions, Colonial Charters, and Other Organic Laws of the States, Territories, and Colonies Now or Heretofore Forming the United States of America. Vol. 2. United States Government Publishing Office – via Internet Archive.
- Limbaugh, Ronald H. (1982). Rocky Mountain Carpetbaggers: Idaho's Territorial Governors, 1863–1890. Moscow, Idaho: University Press of Idaho. ISBN 0-89301-082-0.
