= 1922 United States gubernatorial elections =

← 1921	November 7, 1922; October 3, 1922 (AR); September 11, 1922 (ME)	1923 →

33 governorships
	Majority party	Minority party
Party	Democratic	Republican
Seats before	14	34
Seats after	26	22
Seat change	▲12	▼12
Seats up	8	25
Seats won	20	13
- Democratic gain Democratic hold Republican hold

United States gubernatorial elections were held in 1922, in 33 states, concurrent with the House and Senate elections, on November 7, 1922. Elections took place on October 3 in Arkansas, and September 11 in Maine.

== Results ==
State	Incumbent	Party	Status	Opposing candidates
Alabama	Thomas Kilby	Democratic	Term-limited, Democratic victory	William W. Brandon (Democratic) 77.56% Oliver D. Street (Republican) 21.28% Arlie Barber (Socialist) 1.16%
Arizona	Thomas Edward Campbell	Republican	Defeated, 45.06%	George W. P. Hunt (Democratic) 54.94%
Arkansas (held, 3 October 1922)	Thomas C. McRae	Democratic	Re-elected, 78.09%	John W. Grabiel (Republican) 21.91%
California	William Stephens	Republican	Defeated in Republican primary, Republican victory	Friend Richardson (Republican) 59.69% Thomas Lee Woolwine (Democratic) 35.98% Alexander Horr (Socialist) 4.29% Scattering 0.04%
Colorado	Oliver Henry Shoup	Republican	Retired, Democratic victory	William E. Sweet (Democratic) 49.64% Benjamin Griffith (Republican) 48.29% Lauren E. Arnold (Socialist) 0.82% G. F. Stevens (Farmer Labor) 0.73% Barney Haughey (Old Age Pension) 0.52%
Connecticut	Everett J. Lake	Republican	Retired, Republican victory	Charles A. Templeton (Republican) 52.37% David Fitzgerald (Democratic) 45.73% Martin F. Plunkett (Socialist) 1.91%
Georgia	Thomas W. Hardwick	Democratic	Defeated in Democratic primary, Democratic victory	Clifford M. Walker (Democratic) 100.00% (Democratic primary results); Clifford M. Walker 58.11% Thomas W. Hardwick 40.56% H. Bedinger Baylor 1.33%
Idaho	D. W. Davis	Republican	Retired, Republican victory	Charles C. Moore (Republican) 39.53% H. F. Samuels (Progressive) 31.69% Moses Alexander (Democratic) 28.79%
Iowa	Nathan E. Kendall	Republican	Re-elected, 70.54%	J. R. Files (Democratic) 29.46%
Kansas	Henry Justin Allen	Republican	Retired, Democratic victory	Jonathan M. Davis (Democratic) 50.87% W. Y. Morgan (Republican) 47.41% M. L. Phillips (Socialist) 1.72%
Maine (held, 11 September 1922)	Percival P. Baxter	Republican	Re-elected, 57.95%	William R. Pattangall (Democratic) 42.05%
Massachusetts	Channing H. Cox	Republican	Re-elected, 52.24%	John F. Fitzgerald (Democratic) 45.42% Walter S. Hutchins (Socialist) 1.03% John B. Lewis (Prohibition) 0.77% Henry Hess (Socialist Labor) 0.53%
Michigan	Alex J. Groesbeck	Republican	Re-elected, 61.15%	Alva M. Cummins (Democratic) 37.39% Benjamin Blumenberg (Socialist) 0.76% Belden C. Hoyt (Prohibition) 0.47% E. R. Markley (Socialist Labor) 0.22%
Minnesota	J. A. O. Preus	Republican	Re-elected, 45.21%	Magnus Johnson (Farmer-Labor) 43.13% Edward Indrehus (Democratic) 11.66%
Nebraska	Samuel R. McKelvie	Republican	Retired, Democratic victory	Charles W. Bryan (Democratic) 54.62% Charles H. Randall (Republican) 41.95% Harry C. Parmenter (Progressive) 3.43%
Nevada	Emmet D. Boyle	Democratic	Retired, Democratic victory	James G. Scrugham (Democratic) 53.88% John H. Miller (Republican) 46.12%
New Hampshire	Albert O. Brown	Republican	Retired, Democratic victory	Fred H. Brown (Democratic) 53.28% Windsor H. Goodnow (Republican) 46.72%
New Jersey	Edward I. Edwards	Democratic	Term-limited, Democratic victory	George Sebastian Silzer (Democratic) 52.19% William N. Runyon (Republican) 46.82% George H. Goebel (Socialist) 0.69% Martin R. McDonald (Workers) 0.14% Frank Sanders (Socialist Labor) 0.10% Edward M. Caffall (Single Tax) 0.06%
New Mexico	Merritt C. Mechem	Republican	Retired, Democratic victory	James F. Hinkle (Democratic) 54.57% C. L. Hill (Republican) 44.66% T. S. Smith (Farmer Labor) 0.78%
New York	Nathan L. Miller	Republican	Defeated, 39.97%	Alfred E. Smith (Democratic) 55.21% Edward F. Cassidy (Socialist) 4.31% George K. Hinds (Prohibition) 0.38% Jeremiah D. Crowley (Socialist Labor) 0.13%
North Dakota	Ragnvald Nestos	Republican	Re-elected, 57.65%	William Lemke (Non-Partisan League) 42.35%
Ohio	Harry L. Davis	Republican	Retired, Democratic victory	A. Victor Donahey (Democratic) 50.56% Carmi A. Thompson (Republican) 49.41% Scattering 0.03%
Oklahoma	James B. A. Robertson	Democratic	Term-limited, Democratic victory	John C. Walton (Democratic) 54.45% John Fields (Republican) 44.79% Orville E. Enfield (Socialist) 0.77%
Oregon	Ben W. Olcott	Republican	Defeated, 42.64%	Walter M. Pierce (Democratic) 57.36%
Pennsylvania	William Cameron Sproul	Republican	Term-limited, Republican victory	Gifford Pinchot (Republican) 56.78% John A. McSparran (Democratic) 39.71% Lilith Martin Wilson (Socialist) 2.17% William Repp (Prohibition) 0.97% William H, Thomas (Industrialist) 0.21% John W. Dix (Single Tax) 0.15% Scattering 0.01%
Rhode Island	Emery J. San Souci	Republican	Defeated in Republican primary, Democratic victory	William Smith Flynn (Democratic) 51.72% Harold J. Gross (Republican) 47.17% Charles F. Bishop (Socialist Labor) 0.60% George W. Miller (Labor) 0.51%
South Carolina	Wilson Godfrey Harvey	Democratic	Retired, Democratic victory	Thomas Gordon McLeod (Democratic) 100.00% (Democratic primary run-off results); Thomas Gordon McLeod 53.84% Coleman L. Blease 46.16%
South Dakota	William H. McMaster	Republican	Re-elected, 45.02%	Louis N. Crill (Democratic) 28.74% Alice Lorraine Daly (Non-Partisan League) 26.24%
Tennessee	Alfred A. Taylor	Republican	Defeated, 42.11%	Austin Peay (Democratic) 57.89%
Texas	Pat Morris Neff	Democratic	Re-elected, 82.01%	W. H. Atwell (Republican) 17.99%
Vermont	James Hartness	Republican	Retired, Republican victory	Redfield Proctor Jr. (Republican) 74.82% J. Holmes Jackson (Democratic) 24.97% Scattering 0.21%
Wisconsin	John J. Blaine	Republican	Re-elected, 76.36%	Arthur A. Bentley (Independent Democrat) 10.60% Louis A. Arnold (Socialist) 8.21% M. L. Welles (Prohibition) 4.45% Arthur A. Dietrich (Independent) 0.30% Scattering 0.08%
Wyoming	Robert D. Carey	Republican	Defeated in Republican primary, Democratic victory	William B. Ross (Democratic) 50.03% John W. Hay (Republican) 48.87% Scattering 1.11%

== See also ==
- 1922 United States elections
  - 1922 United States Senate elections
  - 1922 United States House of Representatives elections
