= 1924 United States presidential election in Idaho =

- November 4, 1924

Nominee	Calvin Coolidge	Robert M. La Follette	John W. Davis
Party	Republican	Progressive	Democratic
Home state	Massachusetts	Wisconsin	West Virginia
Running mate	Charles G. Dawes	Burton K. Wheeler	Charles W. Bryan
Electoral vote	4	0	0
Popular vote	69,879	54,160	24,256
Percentage	47.12%	36.52%	16.36%
County results
Coolidge
40–50%
50–60%
60–70%
La Follette
30–40%
40–50%
50–60%
President before election
Calvin Coolidge
Republican
Elected President
Calvin Coolidge
Republican

The 1924 United States presidential election in Idaho took place on November 4, 1924, as part of the 1924 United States presidential election. State voters chose four representatives, or electors, to the Electoral College, who voted for president and vice president.

At state level, Idaho had begun in 1902 to be very much a one-party Republican state, which it has largely remained since apart from the New Deal era of the 1930s and 1940s. For a time there was also a perception that the William Jennings Bryan-led Democratic Party had failed as a "party of reform".

However, with the aid of a powerful "peace vote" due to opposition to participation in World War I, and a considerable part of the substantial vote for Eugene Debs, Woodrow Wilson almost completely swept the Western and Plains States in 1916 (Idaho included), losing only South Dakota and Oregon. These gains were to be lost due to growing anti-Asian and isolationist feelings in the West – James M. Cox in 1920 lost every Idaho county by double digits.

To further marginalize the Democrats, in 1922 "Progressive Party" (Note: This party was actually allied with the Nonpartisan League prominent in the Dakotas at that time, rather than with the Theodore Roosevelt or La Follette "Progressives".) nominee H.F. Samuels ran ahead of Democratic candidate and former Governor Moses Alexander. The conservatism of Coolidge and Davis resulted in Wisconsin Senator Robert M. La Follette mounting a third-party challenge – which La Follette had planned even before the Democratic Convention. In agricultural western and midwestern states like Idaho, there was widespread discontent with the policies of the incumbent Coolidge Administration, and Idaho became one of La Follette's primary targets from the start of his campaign with running mate Burton K. Wheeler of Montana. By the end of July, the GOP was concerned that La Follette was showing strength in Idaho, and this fear grew as the election drew nearer. It was always clear Democrat Davis had no chance in this GOP bastion, and this was backed up by polls in the middle of October, which showed Davis running third and that many of the state's small number of Democrats were backing La Follette.

Thinking he had won most of the West, despite polls actually showing him well behind Coolidge except in his home state, Nevada, and the northern Plains States, La Follette did not campaign in the state during October, preferring to work in the eastern states where he felt he could gain more additional support. In Idaho itself, polls in the four weeks of October showed Coolidge well ahead with around fifty percent of the vote.

Coolidge ultimately underperformed the October polls in Idaho, but still comfortably carried the state by a double-digit margin over La Follette. Coolidge's strong performance in the conservative, highly Mormon southeast and also in Northern Idaho ensured his victory, whilst La Follette did best in rural areas of the southwest and central mountains, where he carried eight counties.

== Results ==
Presidential Candidate	Running Mate	Party	Electoral Vote (EV)	Popular Vote (PV)	
Calvin Coolidge	Charles G. Dawes	Republican	4	69,879	47.12%
Robert M. La Follette	Burton K. Wheeler	Progressive	0	54,160	36.52%
John W. Davis	Charles W. Bryan	Democratic	0	24,256	16.36%

=== Results by county ===
County	John Calvin Coolidge Republican		John William Davis Democratic		Robert Marion La Follette Sr. Progressive		Margin (Note: Because La Follette finished ahead of Davis in Idaho as a whole, all margins given are Coolidge vote minus La Follette vote and all percentage margins Coolidge percentage minus La Follette percentage unless otherwise stated for the county in question.)		Total votes cast
County	#	%	#	%	#	%	#	%	Total votes cast
Ada	7,220	54.47%	2,255	17.01%	3,780	28.52%	3,440	25.95%	13,255
Adams	422	42.24%	208	20.82%	369	36.94%	53	5.31%	999
Bannock	4,520	44.99%	1,612	16.05%	3,914	38.96%	606	6.03%	10,046
Bear Lake	1,611	54.19%	881	29.63%	481	16.18%	730 (Note: In this county where Davis did run second ahead of La Follette, margin given is Coolidge vote minus Davis vote and percentage margin Coolidge percentage minus Davis percentage.)	24.55%	2,973
Benewah	1,158	46.98%	318	12.90%	989	40.12%	169	6.86%	2,465
Bingham	2,693	53.45%	696	13.82%	1,649	32.73%	1,044	20.72%	5,038
Blaine	732	41.59%	543	30.85%	485	27.56%	189	10.74%	1,760
Boise	388	43.02%	198	21.95%	316	35.03%	72	7.98%	902
Bonner	1,714	40.19%	543	12.73%	2,008	47.08%	-294	-6.89%	4,265
Bonneville	2,880	53.62%	431	8.02%	2,060	38.35%	820	15.27%	5,371
Boundary	829	46.97%	244	13.82%	692	39.21%	137	7.76%	1,765
Butte	409	46.01%	196	22.05%	284	31.95%	125	14.06%	889
Camas	226	35.26%	113	17.63%	302	47.11%	-76	-11.86%	641
Canyon	3,820	38.40%	965	9.70%	5,163	51.90%	-1,343	-13.50%	9,948
Caribou	508	58.80%	148	17.13%	208	24.07%	300	34.72%	864
Cassia	2,031	52.01%	538	13.78%	1,336	34.21%	695	17.80%	3,905
Clark	496	69.47%	43	6.02%	175	24.51%	321	44.96%	714
Clearwater	946	47.47%	322	16.16%	725	36.38%	221	11.09%	1,993
Custer	585	45.99%	394	30.97%	293	23.03%	191	15.02%	1,272
Elmore	789	38.01%	381	18.35%	906	43.64%	-117	-5.64%	2,076
Franklin	1,361	51.87%	540	20.58%	723	27.55%	638	24.31%	2,624
Fremont	1,662	45.30%	530	14.45%	1,477	40.26%	185	5.04%	3,669
Gem	1,072	41.31%	380	14.64%	1,143	44.05%	-71	-2.74%	2,595
Gooding	1,097	45.42%	422	17.47%	896	37.10%	201	8.32%	2,415
Idaho	1,363	38.17%	779	21.81%	1,429	40.02%	-66	-1.85%	3,571
Jefferson	1,393	50.07%	305	10.96%	1,084	38.96%	309	11.11%	2,782
Jerome	1,117	46.76%	376	15.74%	896	37.51%	221	9.25%	2,389
Kootenai	3,289	44.84%	790	10.77%	3,256	44.39%	33	0.45%	7,335
Latah	3,053	52.28%	838	14.35%	1,949	33.37%	1,104	18.90%	5,840
Lemhi	1,005	54.38%	442	23.92%	401	21.70%	563	30.47%	1,848
Lewis	650	32.44%	601	29.99%	753	37.57%	-103	-5.14%	2,004
Lincoln	692	54.36%	154	12.10%	427	33.54%	265	20.82%	1,273
Madison	1,417	53.82%	601	22.83%	615	23.36%	802	30.46%	2,633
Minidoka	1,046	39.92%	204	7.79%	1,370	52.29%	-324	-12.37%	2,620
Nez Perce	2,250	42.42%	1,212	22.85%	1,842	34.73%	408	7.69%	5,304
Oneida	956	42.81%	530	23.73%	747	33.45%	209	9.36%	2,233
Owyhee	564	36.53%	309	20.01%	671	43.46%	-107	-6.93%	1,544
Payette	1,160	47.39%	401	16.38%	887	36.23%	273	11.15%	2,448
Power	757	43.13%	314	17.89%	684	38.97%	73	4.16%	1,755
Shoshone	3,034	51.02%	835	14.04%	2,078	34.94%	956	16.08%	5,947
Teton	665	55.70%	186	15.58%	343	28.73%	322	26.97%	1,194
Twin Falls	4,630	51.04%	1,641	18.09%	2,800	30.87%	1,830	20.17%	9,071
Valley	486	40.57%	214	17.86%	498	41.57%	-12	-1.00%	1,198
Washington	1,183	41.33%	623	21.77%	1,056	36.90%	127	4.44%	2,862
Totals	69,879	47.12%	24,256	16.36%	54,160	36.52%	15,719	10.60%	148,295

== Analysis ==
During the pre-election primaries the Democratic Party was divided between a rural, southern and Western wing led by Woodrow Wilson's son-in-law William Giibs McAdoo, opposed to an urban, immigrant and anti-Prohibition faction in major northern cities. The man who would ultimately represent this urban faction was New York Governor Al Smith, whose Catholic faith was vehemently opposed by many rural Appalachian Democrats. Even in his adopted West, McAdoo was not universally liked because of his links to Edward L. Doheny and Harding's "Teapot Dome" petroleum scandal; nonetheless there was sufficient hostility in Idaho to Smith that the state's delegation – alongside others in the West – held a parade for McAdoo at the beginning of the party's convention in New York City. Delegates in Idaho continued to support McAdoo as the convention remained undecided, until the one hundred and first ballot when they finally shifted to former Agriculture Secretary David F. Houston and then to Montana Senator Thomas J. Walsh on the one hundred and second. The 103rd ballot saw Idaho switch to West Virginian John W. Davis, who won the nomination thereon.

== See also ==
- United States presidential elections in Idaho
