= A. L. Freehafer =

American politician

Albertus LeRoy (A.L.) Freehafer (February 12, 1868, in Butler, Richland County, Ohio – October 28, 1940, in Payette, Idaho) was a Democratic politician from Idaho. He was a son of Andrew Freehafer and Martha Ellen Kinton, both natives of Richland County, Ohio.

From 1907 to 1908, he represented Washington County, Idaho, as a member of the House of Representatives, and was a minority leader in the assembly. He served two terms as a state senator. As senator, he represented Washington County, Idaho, from 1909 to 1912 and Payette County, Idaho, from 1929 to 1934.

In 1911, Senator Freehafer introduced a bill, written by L.L. Burtenshaw, to the state legislature of Idaho to create Adams County. The bill passed on March 3, 1911.

Freehafer was a Democratic nominee for governor of Idaho in the 1924 gubernatorial election, but finished in third place behind H. F. Samuels, the Progressive candidate, and the incumbent governor, Republican Charles C. Moore, who won reelection.

Freehafer is the grandfather of Jim McClure, a Republican who represented Idaho in the United States Senate from 1973 to 1991.

== Notes ==
Party political offices
Preceded by Moses Alexander	Democratic Party nominee, Governor of Idaho; 1924	Succeeded by Asher B. Wilson
