= Alexander House (Boise, Idaho) =

Historic building

- U.S. National Register of Historic Places
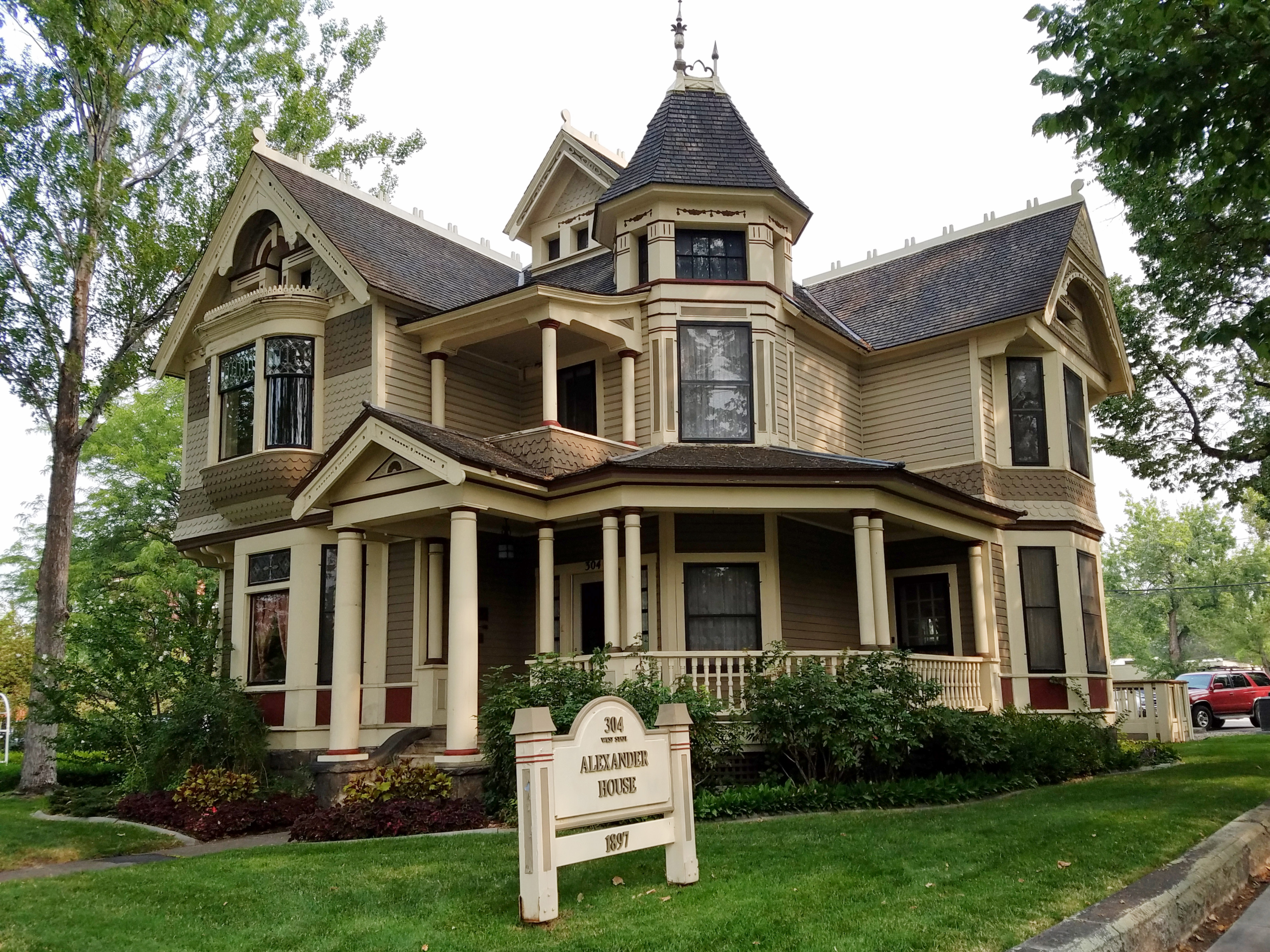
- The Alexander House in 2018

- Location within Idaho Location within the United States
- Location: 304 State St., Boise, Idaho
- Coordinates: 43°36′57″N 116°11′37″W
- Area: less than one acre
- Built: 1897
- Architectural style: Queen Anne
- NRHP reference No.: 72000431
- Added to NRHP: August 7, 1972

The Alexander House is a Queen Anne style house built in Boise, Idaho, in 1897. The house was constructed for Moses Alexander the year he became mayor of Boise. Alexander later became governor of Idaho.

According to Boise Parks and Recreation, construction of the Alexander House was inspired when "the mayor’s wife, Helena, had seen a picture in the newspaper with floor plans for a two-story house with many gables. Following these guides, two carpenters managed to construct the wood-frame building." On April 10, 1897, the Coeur d'Alene Press included an illustration and a floor plan for a house similar to the Alexander House.

The house was listed on the National Register of Historic Places in 1972, and in 1977 the Alexander House became the property of the State of Idaho.

== See also ==
Alexanders (Boise, Idaho)
