= Herman Taylor =

Herman Taylor may refer to:

- Herman L. Taylor Jr. (born 1966), American member of the Maryland House of Delegates
- Herman H. Taylor, Republican politician from Idaho
