= 1922 United States elections =

- ← 1920 1921 1922 1923 1924 → Midterm elections
- Election day: November 7
- Incumbent president: ▌Warren G. Harding (R)
- Next Congress: 68th

Senate elections
- Overall control: Republican hold
- Seats contested: 35 of 96 seats (32 Class 1 seats + 5 special elections)
- Net seat change: Democratic +6
- 1922 Senate election results Democratic gain Democratic hold Republican gain Republican hold Farmer-Labor gain

House elections
- Overall control: Republican hold
- Seats contested: All 435 voting seats
- Net seat change: Democratic +76
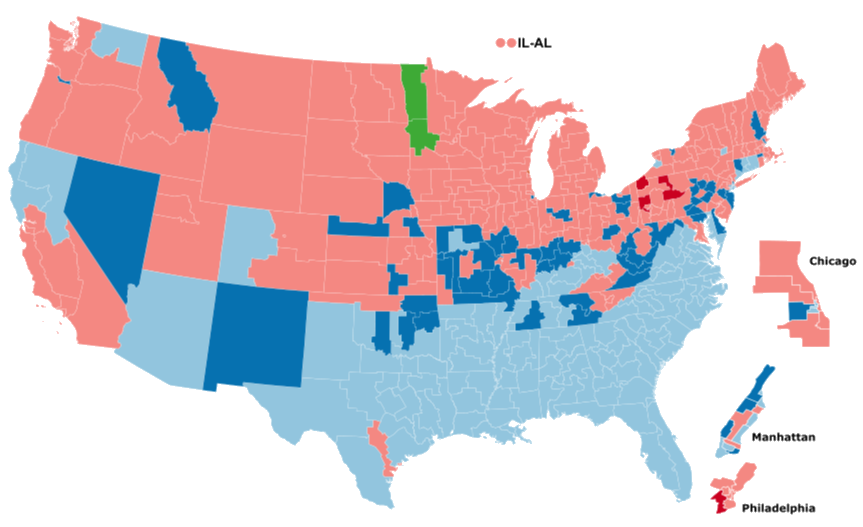
- 1922 House of Representatives election results

Gubernatorial elections
- Seats contested: 33
- Net seat change: Democratic +12
- 1922 gubernatorial election results Democratic gain Democratic hold Republican hold

Elections were held on November 7, 1922. The election took place during Republican President Warren G. Harding's term. The Republican Party lost seats in both chambers of Congress, but retained their majority in the House and Senate. In the House, the Republicans lost seventy-seven seats to the Democratic Party. The Republicans also lost seven seats in the U.S. Senate, six to the Democrats and one to the Minnesota Farmer–Labor Party.

The election is notable in that no redistricting occurred despite the completion of the 1920 United States census, as Congress failed to pass a redistricting bill. This is the only congressional election in which there was no redistricting after a census. The Apportionment Act of 1911 remained in effect until the Reapportionment Act of 1929.

The election was a victory for Harding's progressive opponents in the Republican Party, and helped lead to the Teapot Dome investigations and Robert M. La Follette's 1924 third party candidacy.

== See also ==
- 1922 United States House of Representatives elections
- 1922 United States Senate elections
- 1922 United States gubernatorial elections
