= Alexanders (Boise, Idaho) =

- U.S. National Register of Historic Places
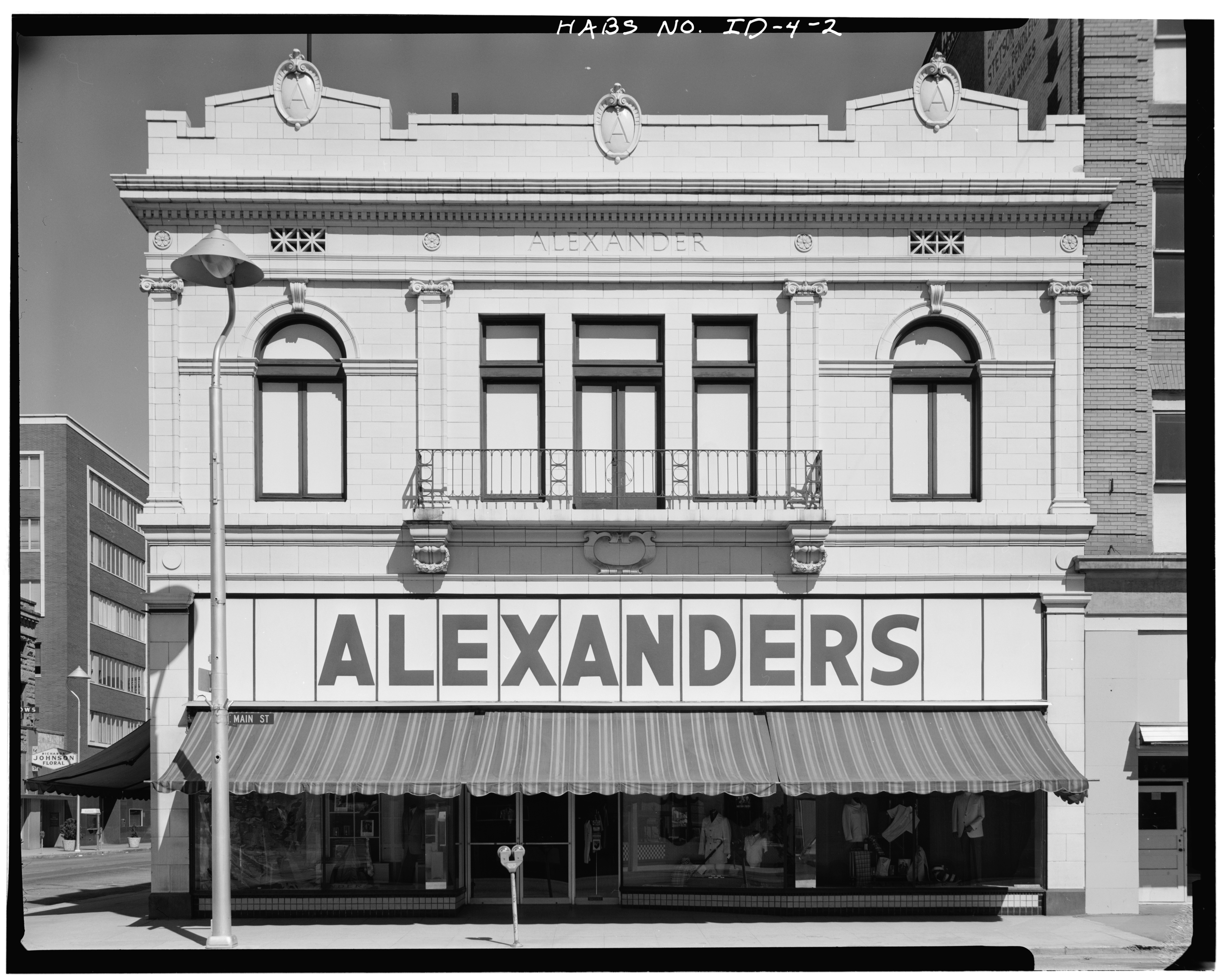
- The Alexander building as it appeared in the 1970s

- Location within Idaho Location within the United States
- Interactive map showing the location of Alexanders
- Location: 826 Main Street, Boise, Idaho
- Coordinates: 43.616338°N 116.204254°W
- Built: 1924
- Architect: Tourtellotte & Hummel
- Architectural style: Second Renaissance Revival
- NRHP reference No.: 78001029
- Added to NRHP: November 20, 1978

Alexanders is a two-story, Second Renaissance Revival style commercial building designed by architects Tourtellotte & Hummel and constructed in Boise, Idaho, United States, in 1924. The brick building is clad in white terracotta.

Alexanders was a men's clothing store chain begun in 1891 by Moses Alexander. After construction, the building at 826 Main Street contained Alexanders' flagship store, although Alexanders had operated a store prior to 1924 at the same corner.

The building was listed on the National Register of Historic Places in 1978.
