= 1890 Idaho gubernatorial election =

- October 1, 1890
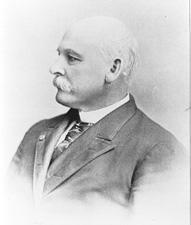

Nominee	George L. Shoup	Benjamin Wilson
Party	Republican	Democratic
Popular vote	10,262	7,948
Percentage	56.35%	43.65%
- County results Shoup: 50–60% 60–70% Wilson: 50–60%
Governor before election
George L. Shoup (Territorial)
Republican
Elected Governor
George L. Shoup
Republican

The 1890 Idaho gubernatorial election was held on October 1, 1890, in order to elect the first governor of Idaho upon Idaho acquiring statehood in July 1890. Incumbent Republican governor of the Idaho Territory George L. Shoup defeated Democratic nominee Benjamin Wilson.

== General election ==
On election day, October 1, 1890, Republican nominee George L. Shoup won the election by a margin of 2,314 votes against his opponent Democratic nominee Benjamin Wilson, thereby retaining Republican control over the new office of governor. Shoup was sworn in as the first governor of the new state of Idaho on December 8, 1890.

=== Results ===
Idaho gubernatorial election, 1890
Party	Candidate	Votes	%
Republican	George L. Shoup (incumbent (Note: Incumbent governor of Idaho Territory.))	10,262	56.35%
Democratic	Benjamin Wilson	7,948	43.65%
Total votes		18,210	100.00%
Republican hold			
