= Ernest L. Parker =

American politician

13th Lieutenant Governor of Idaho
- In office January 1, 1917 – January 6, 1919
- Governor: Moses Alexander
- Preceded by: Herman H. Taylor
- Succeeded by: Charles C. Moore

Personal details
- Born: Ernest Linwood Parker; November 29, 1864 Sigourney, Iowa, U.S.
- Died: June 18, 1934 (aged 69) Lewiston, Idaho, U.S.
- Party: Democratic
- Spouse: Carrie B. Watson (m. 1903)

Ernest Linwood Parker (November 29, 1864 – June 18, 1934) was an American politician from Idaho. He was the 13th lieutenant governor of Idaho. Parker was elected in 1917 along with Governor Moses Alexander. He died in 1934 of complications of diabetes.

Linwood was born in Sigourney, Iowa.

Political offices
Preceded by Herman H. Taylor	Lieutenant Governor of Idaho; January 1, 1917–January 6, 1919	Succeeded by Charles C. Moore
