= John M. Haines =

American politician

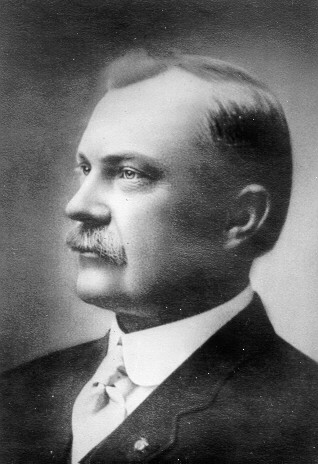

10th Governor of Idaho
- In office January 6, 1913 – January 4, 1915
- Lieutenant: Herman H. Taylor
- Preceded by: James H. Hawley
- Succeeded by: Moses Alexander

Mayor of Boise, Idaho
- In office April 6, 1907 – April 10, 1909
- Preceded by: James A. Pinney
- Succeeded by: J. T. Pence

Personal details
- Born: John Michener Haines; January 1, 1863 Jasper County, Iowa, US
- Died: June 4, 1917 (aged 54) Boise, Idaho, US
- Party: Republican
- Spouse: Mary Symons
- Profession: Real estate

John Michiner Haines (January 1, 1863 – June 4, 1917) was an American politician from the Republican Party. He served as the tenth governor of Idaho from 1913 to 1915.

== Biography ==
Haines was born in Jasper County, Iowa. His father, Isaac L. Haines, was a Quaker, and his mother, Eliza (Bushong) Haines, was a member of the Christian Church. He completed three years of study at William Penn University in Iowa before withdrawing from school due to poor health. He married Mary Symons on May 20, 1883. Her father was a Quaker minister.

== Career ==
Haines was a bank clerk in Friend, Nebraska, until 1885. He then moved to Richfield, Kansas, and was very successful in the real estate industry. He also served as deputy clerk of court in Morton County and was elected Registrar of Deeds. Haines, Walter E. Pierce, and L. H. Cox established a real estate business, W. E. Pierce & Company, in Boise, Idaho in 1890. He served as the mayor of Boise from 1907 to 1909. He was elected and served as Governor of Idaho from 1913 to 1915. During his administration, a workman's compensation bill was vetoed, and a state board of education was established.

Haines lost his bid for reelection and returned to his real estate business.

== Death ==
Haines died in Boise on June 4. 1917. He is interred at the Morris Hill Cemetery, Boise, Ada County, Idaho, United States.

== See also ==
- John Haines House

Party political offices
Preceded by James H. Brady	Republican nominee for Governor of Idaho; 1912, 1914	Succeeded by D. W. Davis
Political offices
Preceded by James A. Pinney	Mayor of Boise, Idaho; 1907–1909	Succeeded by J. T. Pence
Preceded by James H. Hawley	Governor of Idaho; January 6, 1913 – January 4, 1915	Succeeded by Moses Alexander
