= 1918 Idaho gubernatorial election =

- November 5, 1918
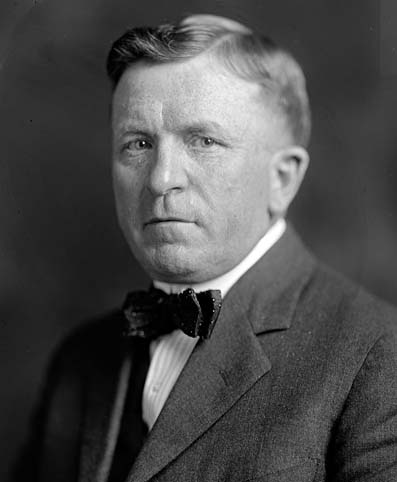

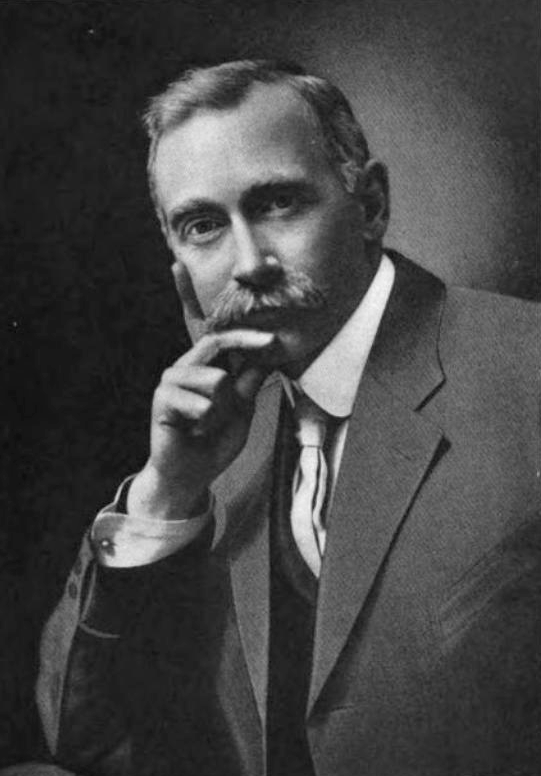
Nominee	D. W. Davis	H. F. Samuels
Party	Republican	Democratic
Popular vote	57,626	38,499
Percentage	59.95%	40.05%
- County results Davis: 50–60% 60–70% 70–80% Samuels: 50–60%
Governor before election
Moses Alexander
Democratic
Elected Governor
D. W. Davis
Republican

The 1918 Idaho gubernatorial election was held on November 5, 1918. Republican nominee D. W. Davis defeated Democratic nominee H. F. Samuels with 59.95% of the vote.

== General election ==
=== Candidates ===
- D. W. Davis, Republican
- H. F. Samuels, Democratic

=== Results ===
1918 Idaho gubernatorial election
Party	Candidate	Votes	%	±%
Republican	D. W. Davis	57,626	59.95%	
Democratic	H. F. Samuels	38,499	40.05%	
Majority		19,127		
Turnout				
Republican gain from Democratic		Swing		
