= D. W. Davis =

American politician (1873 - 1959)

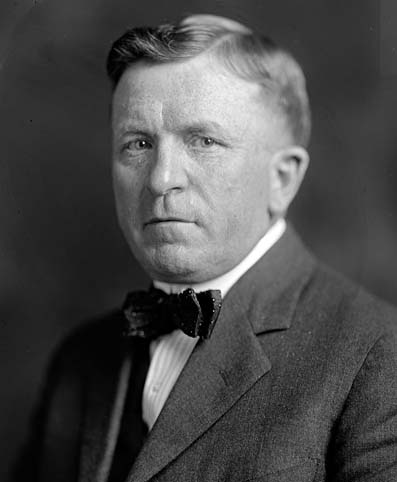

Commissioner of the United States Reclamation Service
- In office 1923–1924
- President: Calvin Coolidge
- Preceded by: Arthur Powell Davis
- Succeeded by: Elwood Mead

12th Governor of Idaho
- In office January 6, 1919 – January 1, 1923
- Lieutenant: Charles C. Moore
- Preceded by: Moses Alexander
- Succeeded by: Charles C. Moore

Member of the Idaho Senate
- In office 1913–1915

Personal details
- Born: April 23, 1873 Cardiff, Wales
- Died: August 5, 1959 (aged 86) Boise, Idaho, U.S.
- Party: Republican
- Spouse(s): Florence Gilliland (widowed), Nellie Johnson
- Profession: Banker

David William Davis (April 23, 1873 – August 5, 1959) was an American politician who served as the 12th governor of Idaho from 1919 to 1923. He later served briefly as commissioner of the United States Bureau of Reclamation in 1923 and 1925. He later became a special assistant to the U.S. secretary of the interior.

== Early life ==
Davis was born in Cardiff, Wales. His family immigrated to the United States in 1875 and settled near Rippey, Iowa. Rippey, located 35 miles northwest of Des Moines, was then a major coal-mining community. This was before strict child labor laws, and Davis began working in the coal mines in 1885 when he was twelve years old.

== Career ==
After a few years in the mines, Davis landed a job in the mining company store in Dawson, Iowa, about five miles south of Rippey. Personable and hard-working, Davis showed a talent for the retail business. That led to a position as the manager of a local Farmer's Cooperative Association. Almost immediately thereafter, he became cashier at a bank in Rippey. At that time, the Cashier in a small bank could be more than what is known simply as a Teller in the United States. A chief cashier was a very high-level position, able to issue cashier's checks against the bank's reserves. In view of his later career in banking, it seems likely that Davis attained that level of responsibility. It is known that, lacking much formal schooling, he also followed a program of diligent self-education.

He reportedly spent a brief stint in the United States Navy, attaining the rank of Petty Officer, First Class after distinguished service in the Philippines. According to later accounts, Davis continued to suffer the ill effects of his time in the mines. Coupled with his intense efforts on and off the job, deteriorating health finally forced him to take a year or so off for a rest cure.

In 1907, Davis helped organize the First National Bank of American Falls. Over the next several years, he aggressively promoted the town and its farm interests. At some point, Davis' parents followed him to American Falls, where his father lived until his death in 1913.

Davis also became very active in the Republican Party in Idaho. In 1912, he served as a delegate to the Republican National Convention. He also served as a member of the Idaho Senate from 1913 to 1915.

=== Governor of Idaho ===
Davis won the Republican nomination for governor in 1916, but was narrowly defeated by the Democratic incumbent, Moses Alexander. Davis was nominated again in 1918 and defeated Democrat H. F. Samuels. ex-governor James H. Hawley said that, for various reasons, "A great many of the old time Democrats in the state refused to support Mr. Samuels." Davis won by a margin of 57,626 to 38,499 votes. He was reelected in 1920. Although the election was a three-way race, Davis received 53 percent of the votes, out-polling his nearest rival by 75,748 to 38,509.

During his tenure, funding was sanctioned for the establishment of the bureau of budget and taxation, plus a veteran's welfare program and a teacher's pension system. A road-building program was initiated, the state's statutes were reorganized, the state's administrative agencies were unified, and three constitutional amendments were sanctioned.

Davis left office on January 1, 1923.

=== Later life ===
Along with his political career, Davis stayed heavily involved with banking, even after he moved to Boise when he was first elected as governor. That interest led to his election as president of the Idaho State Bankers Association in 1918.

Davis also took an active interest in irrigation projects, especially those promoted by the Carey Act along the Snake River. During his term as governor, Davis organized a meeting in Salt Lake City for fifteen of the arid western states to discuss water issues. Out of that meeting grew the Western States Reclamation Association, to provide a united voice for advice to the U. S. government on federally funded irrigation projects.

Two months after Davis left the governor's office, he was appointed as a special assistant to the Secretary of the Interior, to supervise the United States Reclamation Service and served until 1924. He then served from 1924 to 1932 as director of finance for the Interior Department, and for a short time in 1931 as a special advisor to President Herbert Hoover.

After his service with the federal government, Davis returned to his Idaho banking interests and also expanded his investments in mining ventures in the Northwest. Governor David W. Davis died on August 5, 1959, and was buried at the Cloverdale Cemetery in Boise, Idaho.

== Personal life ==
In 1903, Davis's first wife, Florence O. Gilliland, died. Two years later, he married Nellie Johnson, whose father owned a bank that merged with the one where Davis worked. The following year, the couple moved to American Falls, Idaho, which he had apparently observed during his rest cure.

== See also ==
- List of United States governors born outside the United States

Party political offices
| Preceded by John M. Haines | Republican nominee for Governor of Idaho; 1916, 1918, 1920 | Succeeded by Charles C. Moore |
