= Herman H. Taylor =

American judge

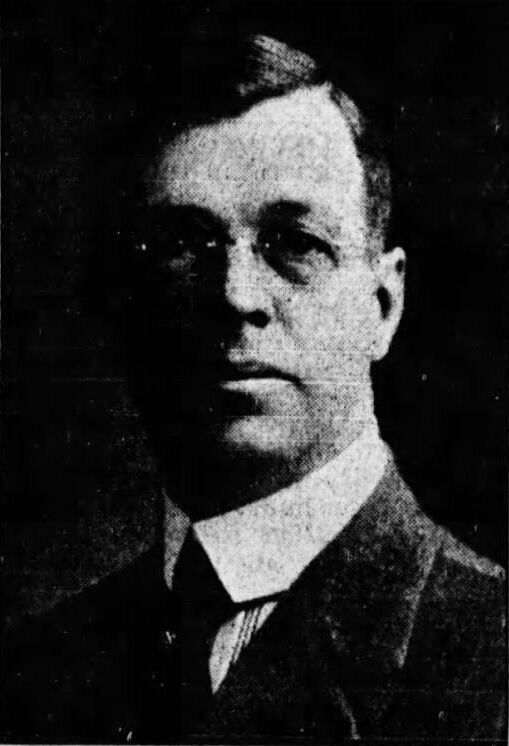
- Taylor in 1916

12th Lieutenant Governor of Idaho
- In office January 5, 1913 – January 1, 1917
- Governor: John M. Haines
- Preceded by: Lewis H. Sweetser
- Succeeded by: Ernest L. Parker

Personal details
- Born: Herman Henry Taylor; December 6, 1877 Wisconsin, U.S.
- Died: February 22, 1929 (aged 51) Boise, Idaho
- Party: Republican
- Spouse(s): Katherine Parr Taylor (died 1917); Maude K. Taylor

Herman Henry Taylor (December 6, 1877 – February 22, 1929) was a Republican politician from Idaho. He served as the 12th lieutenant governor of Idaho. Taylor was elected in 1913 along with Governor John M. Haines. He was later elected in 1915 along with Democratic governor Moses Alexander. He later served as a justice of the Idaho Supreme Court, from 1925 to 1929. He died of angina in 1929.

Political offices
| Preceded by Lewis H. Sweetser | Lieutenant Governor of Idaho; January 5, 1913–January 1, 1917 | Succeeded by Ernest L. Parker |
