= Charles C. Moore =

American politician (1866–1958)

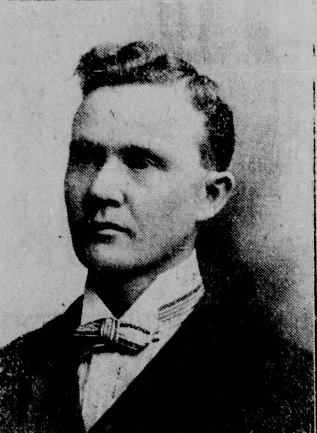

35th Commissioner of the General Land Office
- In office May 9, 1929 – May 20, 1933
- President: Herbert Hoover; Franklin D. Roosevelt
- Preceded by: William Spry
- Succeeded by: Fred W. Johnson

13th Governor of Idaho
- In office January 1, 1923 – January 3, 1927
- Lieutenant: H. C. Baldridge
- Preceded by: D. W. Davis
- Succeeded by: H. C. Baldridge

14th Lieutenant Governor of Idaho
- In office January 6, 1919 – January 1, 1923
- Governor: D. W. Davis
- Preceded by: Ernest L. Parker
- Succeeded by: H. C. Baldridge

Member of the Idaho House of Representatives
- In office 1903–1906

Personal details
- Born: February 26, 1866 Holt County, Missouri, US
- Died: March 19, 1958 (aged 92) St. Anthony, Idaho, US
- Party: Republican
- Spouse(s): Minnie McCoy (widowed), Clara W. Wallan
- Profession: Teacher, banker, real estate

Charles Calvin Moore (February 26, 1866 – March 19, 1958) was the 13th governor of Idaho, serving from 1923 until 1927. He later served as the commissioner of the General Land Office from 1929 to 1933.

== Biography ==
Moore was born in Holt County, Missouri. He attended public school and a teachers' training school. He married Minnie McCoy and they had four children. She died in 1909; and he later married Clara W. Wallan.

== Career ==
Moore was deputy county assessor in 1894, and a county auditor from 1895 to 1898. He moved to Idaho in 1899, where he taught school and worked in real estate. Moore co-founded the town of Ashton, Idaho.

Moore served in the Idaho Legislature as a member of the Idaho State House of Representatives from 1903 to 1906. He was postmaster of Saint Anthony from 1908 to 1913. He was elected the 14th Lieutenant Governor of Idaho in 1918 and served in that capacity during the administration of Governor D. W. Davis.

In 1922, Moore was elected Governor of Idaho, defeating Progressive H. F. Samuels and former Democratic governor Moses Alexander. Moore became the first person in Idaho history to successfully run for governor after serving as lieutenant governor. He was reelected in 1924, by defeating Samuels and Democrat A. L. Freehafer.

After leaving office, Moore returned to his real estate career. In 1929, he was appointed to as the United States Commissioner of the General Land Office.

== Death ==
Moore died from a stroke on March 19, 1958, in Saint Anthony, Idaho. He is interred at the Mount Olivet Cemetery, Salt Lake City, Utah.

Political offices
Preceded by Ernest L. Parker	Lieutenant Governor of Idaho; January 6, 1919 – January 1, 1923	Succeeded by H. C. Baldridge
Preceded by D. W. Davis	Governor of Idaho; January 1, 1923 – January 3, 1927	Succeeded by H. C. Baldridge
Preceded by William Spry	Commissioner of the General Land Office; May 9, 1929 – May 20, 1933	Succeeded by Fred W. Johnson
Party political offices
Preceded by D. W. Davis	Republican Party nominee, Governor of Idaho; 1922 (won), 1924 (won)	Succeeded by H. C. Baldridge
