= 1900 Idaho gubernatorial election =

- November 6, 1900
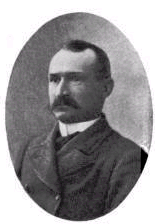

Nominee	Frank W. Hunt	D. W. Standrod
Party	Democratic	Republican
Popular vote	28,628	26,468
Percentage	50.87%	47.04%
- Results by county Hunt: 50–60% 60–70% Standrod: 50–60%
Governor before election
Frank Steunenberg
Democratic
Elected Governor
Frank W. Hunt
Democratic

The 1900 Idaho gubernatorial election was held on November 6, 1900. Democratic nominee Frank W. Hunt defeated Republican nominee D. W. Standrod with 50.87% of the vote.

== General election ==
=== Candidates ===
Major party candidates

- Frank W. Hunt, Democratic
- D. W. Standrod, Republican

Other candidates

- Silas Luttrell, Prohibition

=== Results ===
1900 Idaho gubernatorial election
Party	Candidate	Votes	%	±%
Democratic	Frank W. Hunt	28,628	50.87%	+2.04%
Republican	D. W. Standrod	26,468	47.04%	+12.33%
Prohibition	Silas Luttrell	1,037	1.84%	−1.12%
Majority		2,160		
Turnout				
Democratic hold		Swing		
