= 1914 Idaho gubernatorial election =

- November 3, 1914
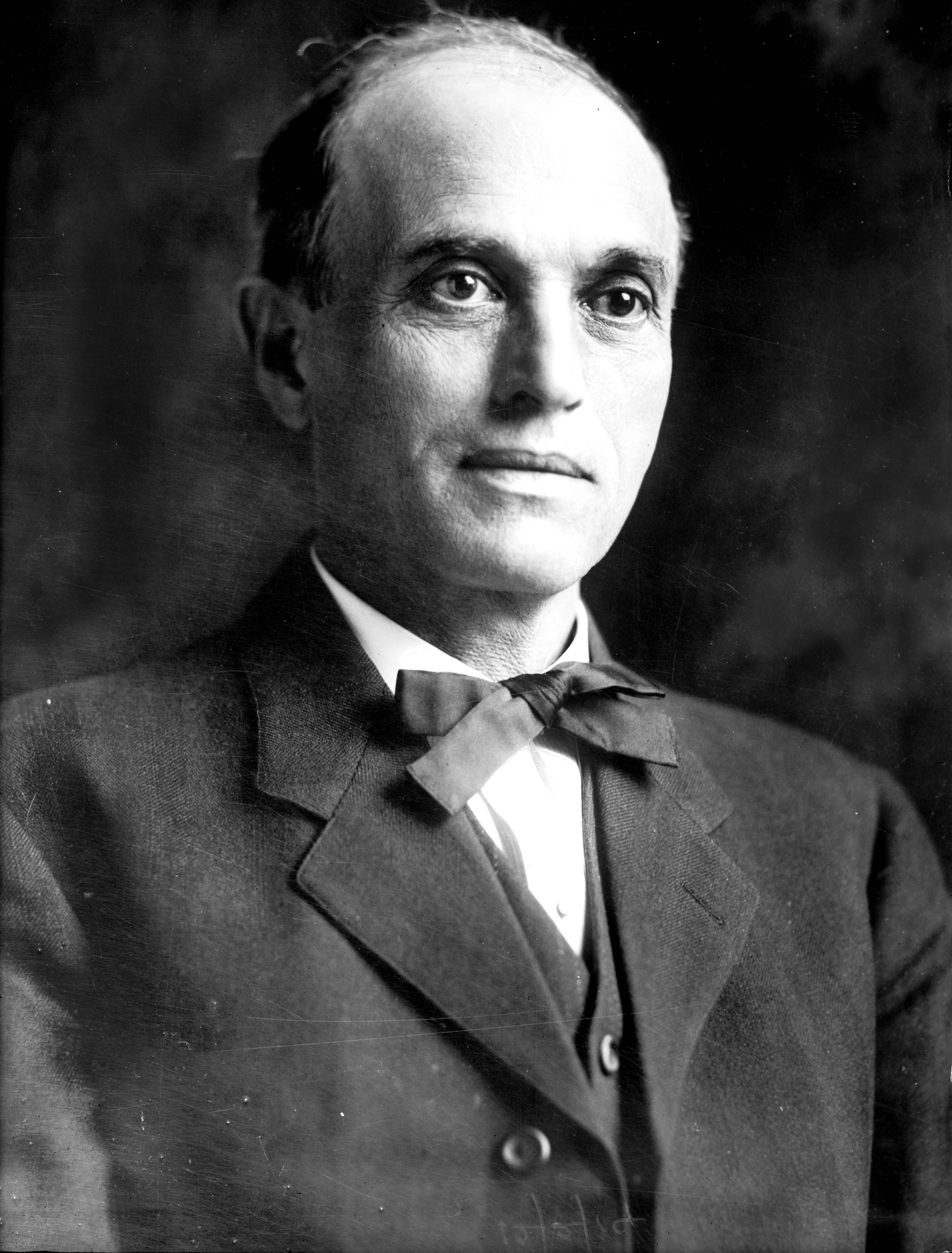

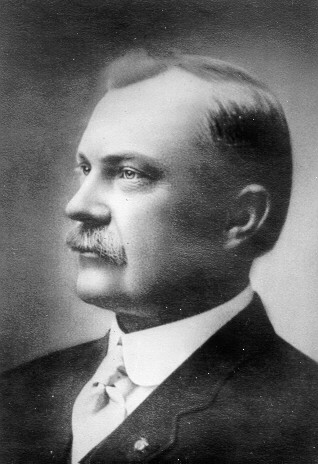
Nominee	Moses Alexander	John M. Haines
Party	Democratic	Republican
Popular vote	47,618	40,349
Percentage	44.13%	37.39%
Nominee	Hugh E. McElroy	L. A. Coblentz
Party	Progressive	Socialist
Popular vote	10,583	7,967
Percentage	9.81%	7.38%
- County results Alexander: 30–40% 40–50% 50–60% 60–70% Haines: 30–40% 40–50% 50–60% McElroy: 30–40%
Governor before election
John M. Haines
Republican
Elected Governor
Moses Alexander
Democratic

The 1914 Idaho gubernatorial election was held on November 3, 1914. Democratic nominee Moses Alexander defeated incumbent Republican John M. Haines with 44.13% of the vote.

== General election ==
=== Candidates ===
Major party candidates

- Moses Alexander, Democratic
- John M. Haines, Republican

Other candidates

- Hugh E. McElroy, Progressive
- L. A. Coblentz, Socialist

=== Results ===
1914 Idaho gubernatorial election
Party	Candidate	Votes	%	±%
Democratic	Moses Alexander	47,618	44.13%	
Republican	John M. Haines (incumbent)	40,349	37.39%	
Progressive	Hugh E. McElroy	10,583	9.81%	
Socialist	L. A. Coblentz	7,967	7.38%	
Majority		7,269		
Turnout				
Democratic gain from Republican		Swing		
