= 1920 Idaho gubernatorial election =

- November 2, 1920
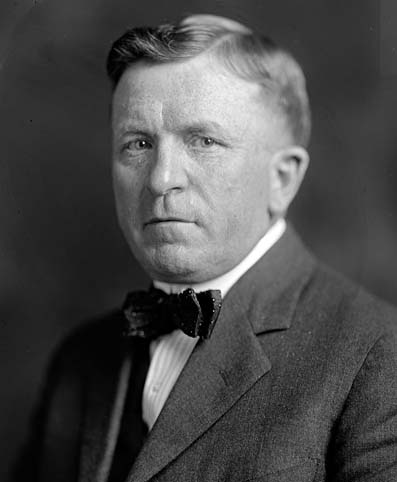

Nominee	D. W. Davis	Ted A. Walters	Sherman D. Fairchild
Party	Republican	Democratic	Independent
Popular vote	75,748	38,509	28,752
Percentage	52.97%	26.93%	20.11%
- County results Davis: 30–40% 40–50% 50–60% 60–70% 70–80% Walters: 40–50% Fairchild: 40–50%
Governor before election
D. W. Davis
Republican
Elected Governor
D. W. Davis
Republican

The 1920 Idaho gubernatorial election was held on Tuesday November 2, to elect the Governor of Idaho. Incumbent Governor D. W. Davis defeated Democratic Candidate Ted A. Walters with 52.97% of the vote.

== General election ==
=== Candidates ===
- D. W. Davis, incumbent Governor (Republican)
- Sherman D. Fairchild (Independent)
- Ted A. Walters (Democratic)

=== Results ===
1920 Idaho gubernatorial election
Party	Candidate	Votes	%	±%
Republican	D. W. Davis (incumbent)	75,748	52.97%	
Democratic	Ted A. Walters	38,509	26.93%	
Independent	Sherman D. Fairchild	28,752	20.11%	
Majority		37,239		
Turnout				
Republican hold		Swing		
