= 1908 Idaho gubernatorial election =

- November 3, 1908
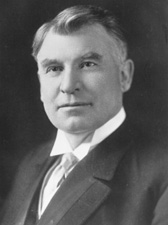

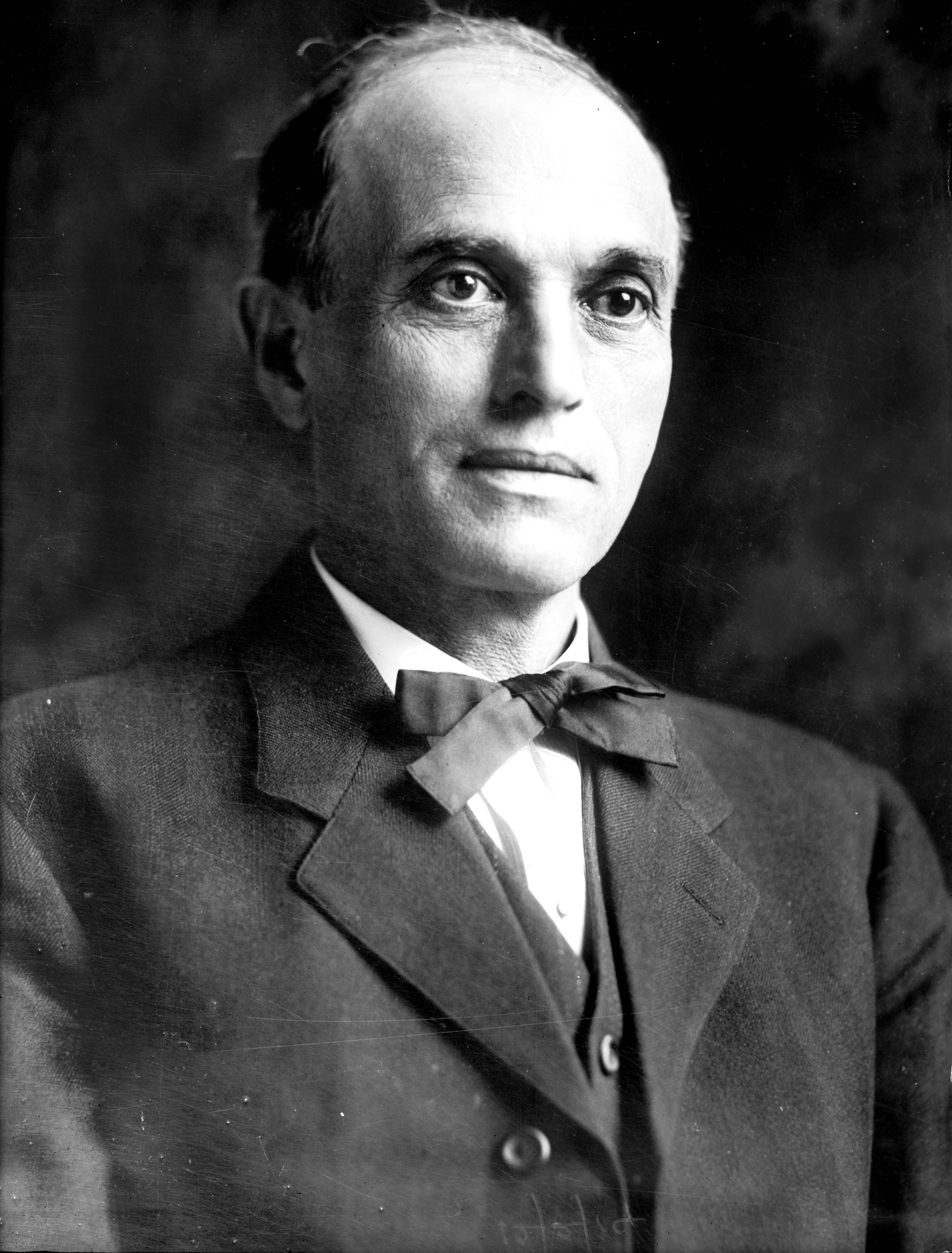

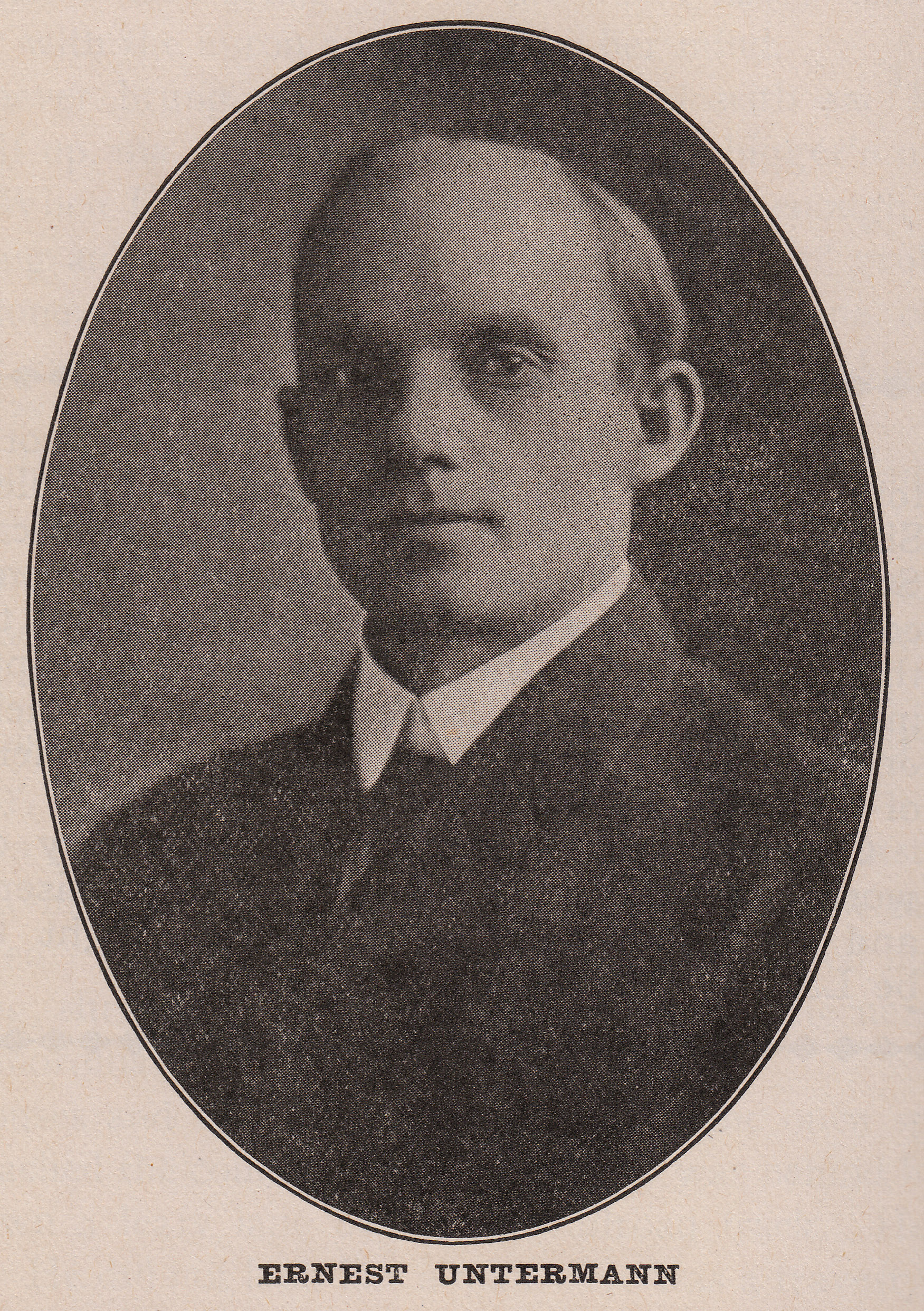
Nominee	James H. Brady	Moses Alexander	Ernest Untermann
Party	Republican	Democratic	Socialist
Popular vote	47,864	40,145	6,155
Percentage	49.61%	41.61%	6.38%
- County results Brady: 40–50% 50–60% Alexander: 40–50% 50–60%
Governor before election
Frank R. Gooding
Republican
Elected Governor
James H. Brady
Republican

The 1908 Idaho gubernatorial election was held on November 3, 1908. Republican nominee James H. Brady defeated Democratic nominee Moses Alexander with 49.61% of the vote.

== General election ==
=== Candidates ===
Major party candidates

- James H. Brady, Republican
- Moses Alexander, Democratic

Other candidates

- Ernest Untermann, Socialist
- William C. Stalker, Prohibition
- E.W. Johnson, Independent

=== Results ===
1908 Idaho gubernatorial election
Party	Candidate	Votes	%	±%
Republican	James H. Brady	47,864	49.61%	
Democratic	Moses Alexander	40,145	41.61%	
Socialist	Ernest Untermann	6,155	6.38%	
Prohibition	William C. Stalker	2,168	2.25%	
Independent	E.W. Johnson	131	0.14%	
Majority		7,719		
Turnout				
Republican hold		Swing		
