= 1916 Idaho gubernatorial election =

- November 7, 1916
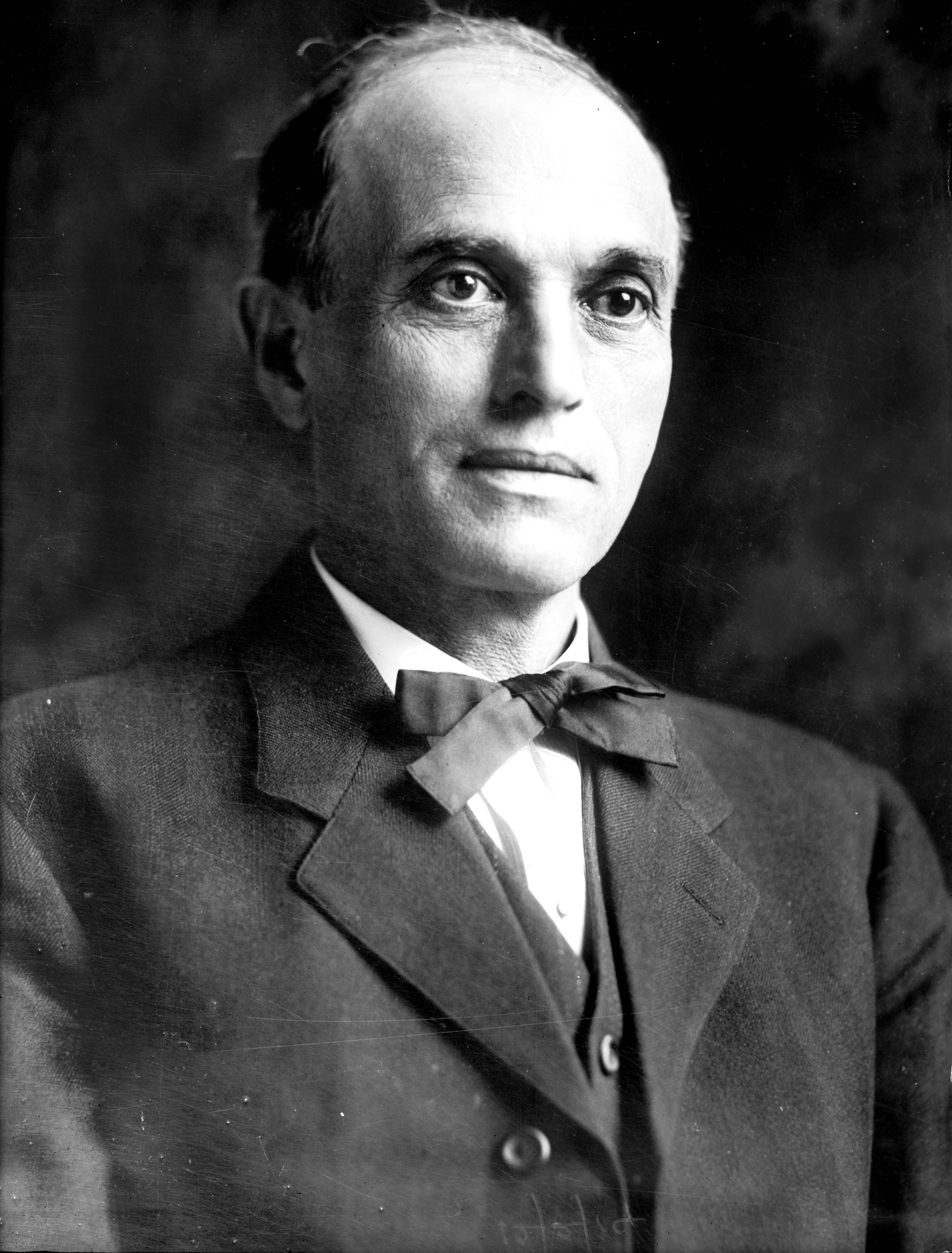

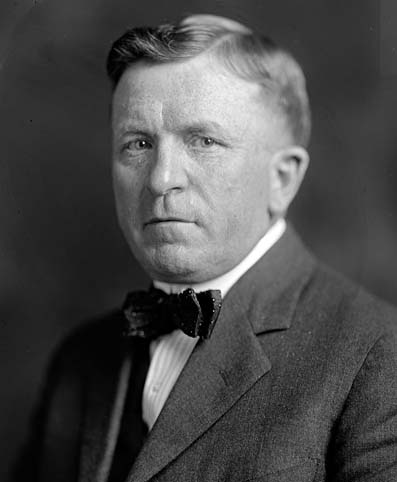

Nominee	Moses Alexander	D. W. Davis	Annie E. Triplow
Party	Democratic	Republican	Socialist
Popular vote	63,877	63,305	7,321
Percentage	47.49%	47.07%	5.44%
- County results Alexander: 40–50% 50–60% 60–70% Davis: 40–50% 50–60%
Governor before election
Moses Alexander
Democratic
Elected Governor
Moses Alexander
Democratic

The 1916 Idaho gubernatorial election was held on November 7, 1916. Incumbent Democrat Moses Alexander defeated Republican nominee D. W. Davis with 47.49% of the vote.

== General election ==
=== Candidates ===
Major party candidates

- Moses Alexander, Democratic
- D. W. Davis, Republican

Other candidates

- Annie E. Triplow, Socialist

=== Results ===
1916 Idaho gubernatorial election
Party	Candidate	Votes	%	±%
Democratic	Moses Alexander (incumbent)	63,877	47.49%	
Republican	D. W. Davis	63,305	47.07%	
Socialist	Annie E. Triplow	7,321	5.44%	
Majority		572		
Turnout				
Democratic hold		Swing		
