= 1924 Idaho gubernatorial election =

- November 4, 1924
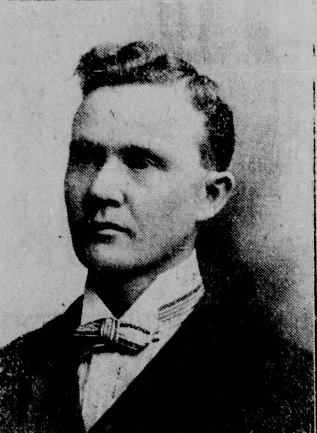

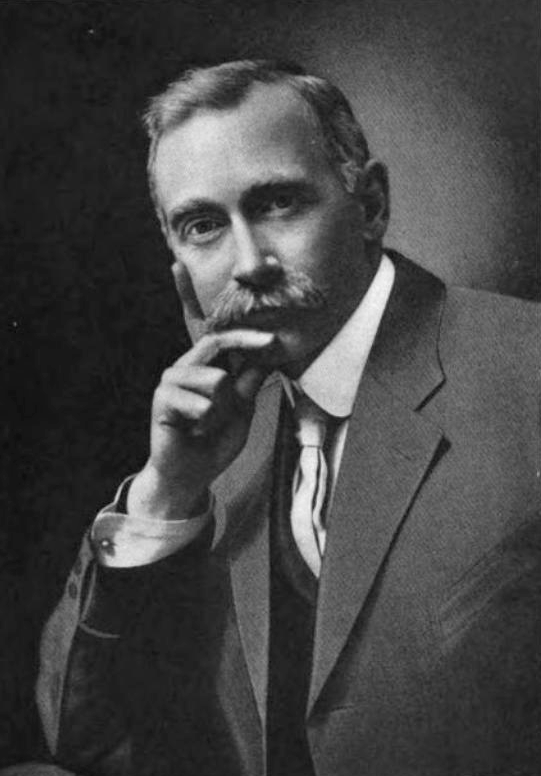

Nominee	Charles C. Moore	H. F. Samuels	A. L. Freehafer
Party	Republican	Progressive	Democratic
Popular vote	65,508	58,167	25,081
Percentage	43.94%	39.02%	16.82%
- County results Moore: 30–40% 40–50% 50–60% 60–70% 70–80% Samuels: 40–50% 50–60%
Governor before election
Charles C. Moore
Republican
Elected Governor
Charles C. Moore
Republican

The 1924 Idaho gubernatorial election was held on November 4, 1924. Incumbent Republican Charles C. Moore defeated Progressive nominee H. F. Samuels with 43.94% of the vote.

== General election ==
=== Candidates ===
Major party candidates

- Charles C. Moore, Republican
- A. L. Freehafer, Democratic

Other candidates

- H. F. Samuels, Progressive
- Dennis J. O'Mahoney, Socialist

=== Results ===
1924 Idaho gubernatorial election
Party	Candidate	Votes	%	±%
Republican	Charles C. Moore (incumbent)	65,508	43.94%	
Progressive	H. F. Samuels	58,167	39.02%	
Democratic	A. L. Freehafer	25,081	16.82%	
Socialist	Dennis J. O'Mahoney	321	0.22%	
Majority		7,341		
Turnout				
Republican hold		Swing		
