= H. F. Samuels =

American architect

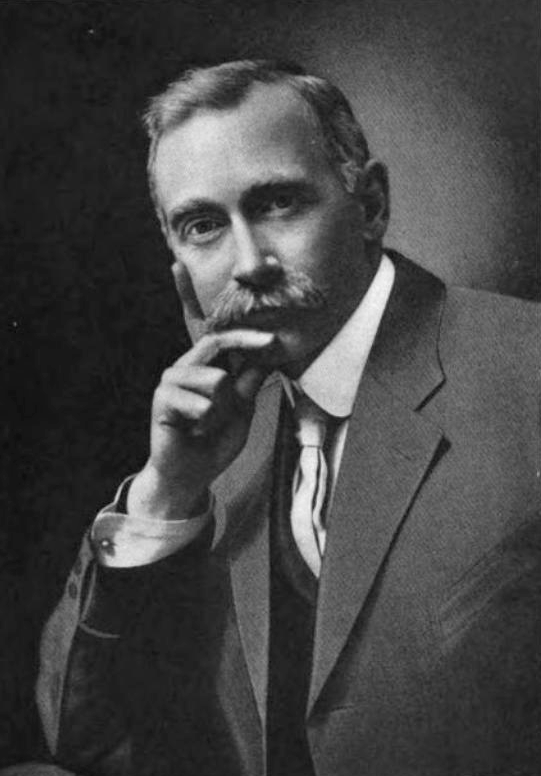
- Born: Henry Floyd Samuels; April 4, 1869; Washington County, Mississippi
- Died: February 23, 1948 (aged 78); Sequim, Washington
- Education: University of Michigan Law School; George Washington University Law School
- Occupations: Lawyer, politician, businessman
- Political party: Republican; Democratic; Idaho Progressive
- Spouses: Iona Snyder (m. 1892) Ada Jenkins (m. 1905)
- Children: 3

Henry Floyd Samuels (1869–1948) was an American attorney, politician, mining executive, and farmer. He was the leading spokesman of the Idaho chapter of the Non-Partisan League and later the Idaho Progressive Party in the 1910s and 1920s.

== Early life and education ==
H. F. Samuels was born in Washington County, Mississippi on April 4, 1869. Named Henry Floyd, he always went by his initials to distinguish himself from his father, and later his son, who had the same name. His family moved to Crawford County, Indiana when he was three years old, and he attended high school at Leavenworth.

He studied law at the University of Michigan, and was admitted to the bar in Indiana in February 1892. He later earned a master of laws degree at Columbian University (now George Washington University).

== Mining and political career ==
He became a multi-millionaire in the mining industry in Idaho Panhandle. Originally a Republican, with Non-Partisan League support, in 1918, Samuels won the Democratic nomination for governor of Idaho despite strong opposition from the Democratic Party leadership. However, Samuels was defeated by Republican D. W. Davis.

After Idaho repealed the direct primary in 1919, the Non-Partisan League formed the Idaho Progressive Party. Idaho Progressives nominated Samuels as their gubernatorial candidate in 1922 and 1924. Although Samuels beat the Democratic candidates in both elections, he was ultimately defeated in both by Republican Charles C. Moore.

In 1926 Samuels won the Progressive United States Senate nomination, again bested the Democratic nominee (John F. Nugent), but lost to the Republican (Frank R. Gooding). He retired from public life after the demise of the Idaho Progressive Party in 1928.

He owned a hotel, the Samuels Hotel, built with profits from mining.

== Personal life ==
Samuels married Iona Snyder on December 25, 1892, and they had one daughter. On February 27, 1905, he remarried to Ada Jenkins, and they had a son and a daughter.

He died in Sequim, Washington on February 23, 1948.

Party political offices
Preceded by Moses Alexander	Democratic Party nominee, Governor of Idaho; 1918	Succeeded by Ted A. Walters
Preceded by None	Progressive Party nominee, Governor of Idaho; 1922 (won), 1924 (won)	Succeeded by W. Scott Hall
Preceded by None	Progressive Party nominee, U.S. Senator (Class 3) from Idaho; 1926	Succeeded by None
