= 1922 Idaho gubernatorial election =

- November 7, 1922
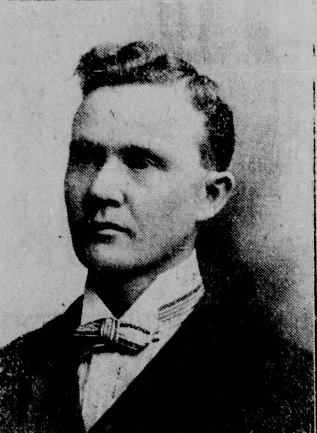

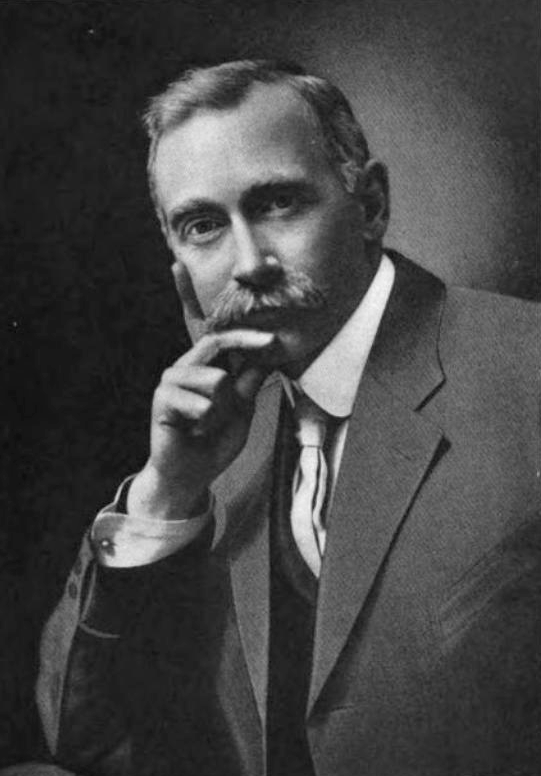

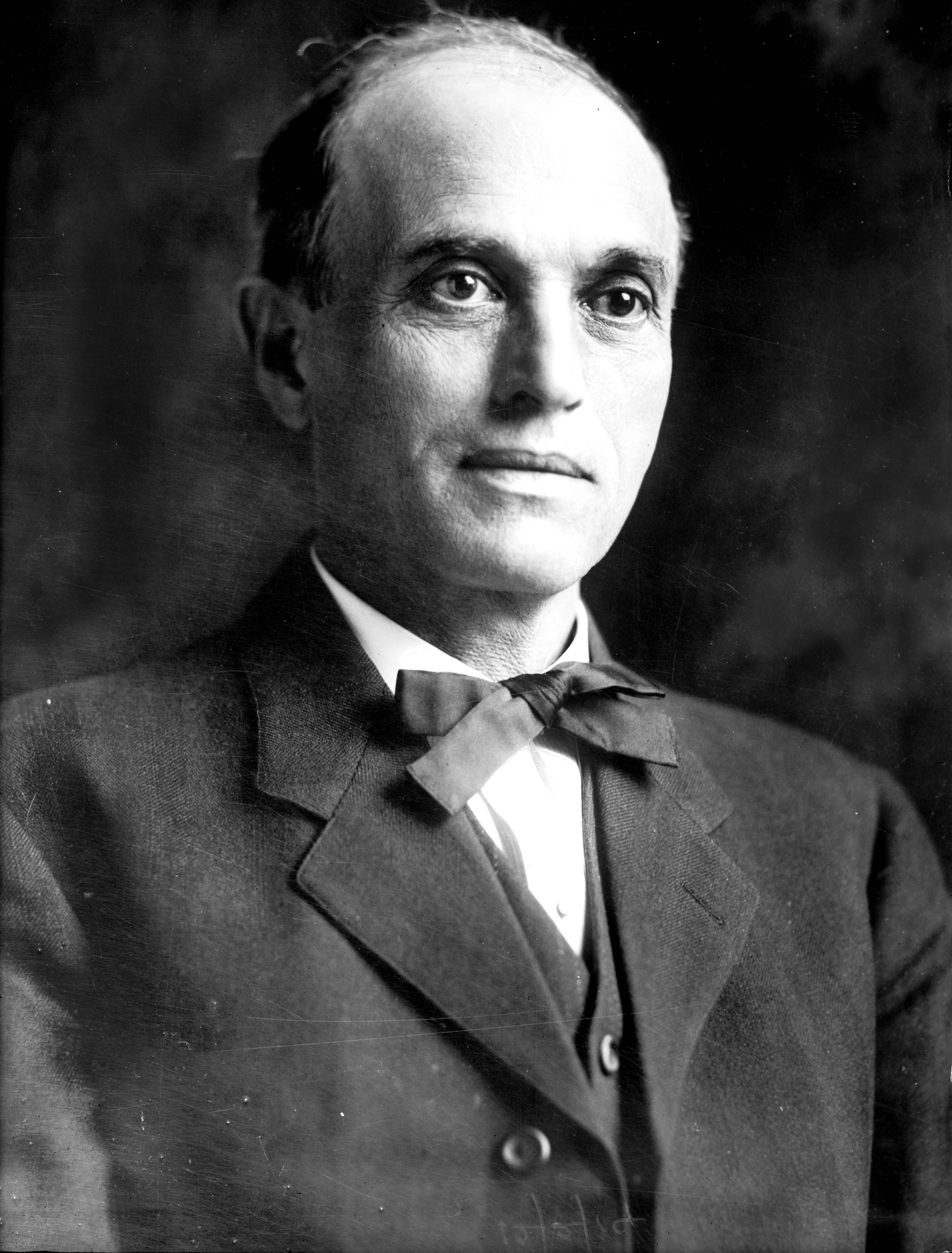
| Nominee | Charles C. Moore | H. F. Samuels | Moses Alexander |
| Party | Republican | Progressive | Democratic |
| Popular vote | 50,538 | 40,516 | 36,810 |
| Percentage | 39.53% | 31.69% | 28.79% |
- County results Moore: 30–40% 40–50% 50–60% 60–70% Samuels: 30–40% 40–50% 50–60% Alexander: 30–40% 40–50% 50–60%
Governor before election
D. W. Davis
Republican
Elected Governor
Charles C. Moore
Republican

The 1922 Idaho gubernatorial election was held on November 7, 1922. Republican nominee Charles C. Moore defeated Progressive nominee H. F. Samuels with 39.53% of the vote.

== General election ==
=== Candidates ===
Major party candidates

- Charles C. Moore, Republican
- Moses Alexander, Democratic

Other candidates

- H. F. Samuels, Progressive

=== Results ===
1922 Idaho gubernatorial election
| Party | Candidate | Votes | % | ±% |
|---|---|---|---|---|
| Republican | Charles C. Moore | 50,538 | 39.53% | |
| Progressive | H. F. Samuels | 40,516 | 31.69% | |
| Democratic | Moses Alexander | 36,810 | 28.79% | |
| Majority | | 10,022 | | |
| Turnout | | | | |
| Republican hold | | Swing | | |
