= Moses Alexander =

American businessman and politician (1853–1932)

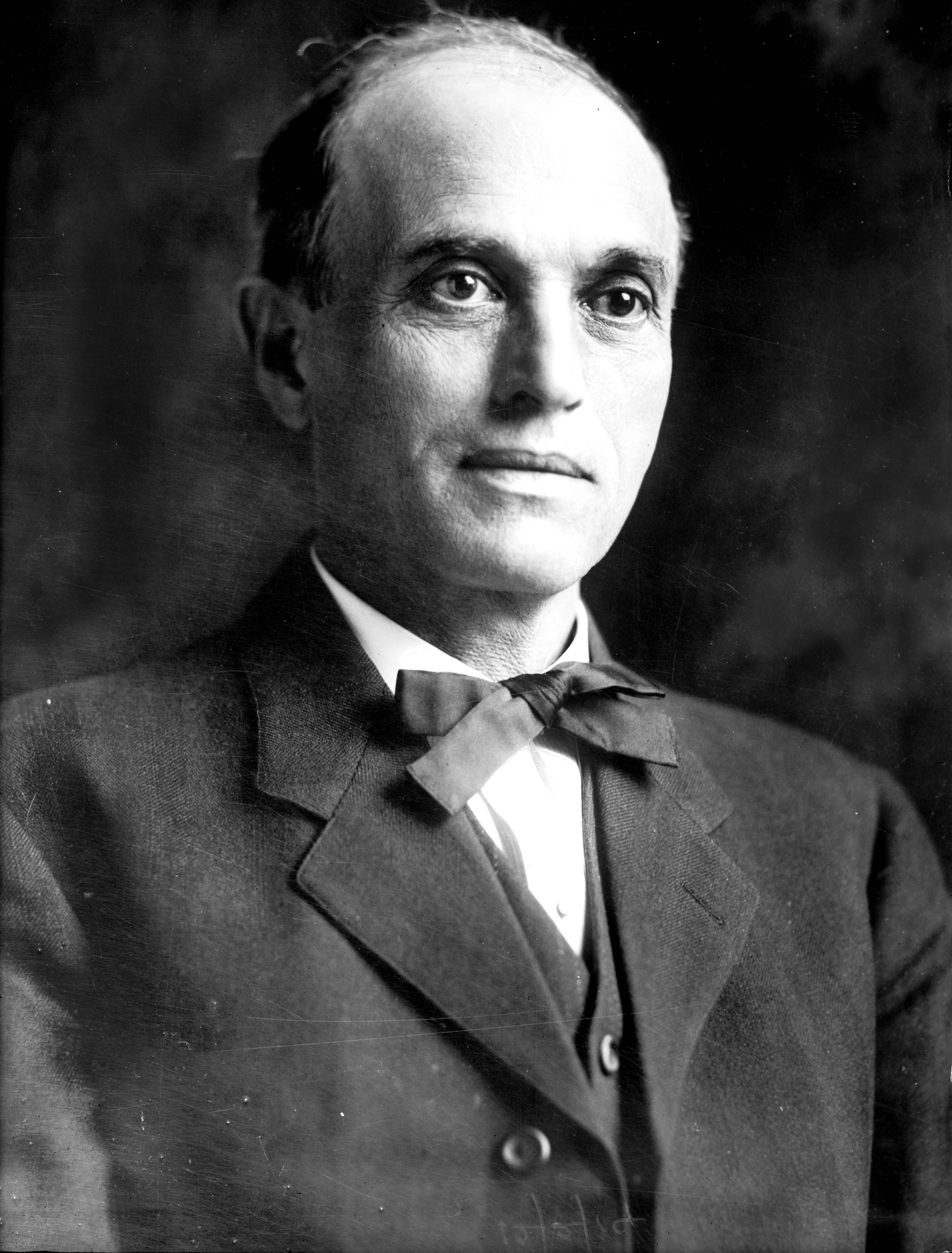
- Alexander, c. 1910–1915

11th Governor of Idaho
- In office January 4, 1915 – January 6, 1919
- Lieutenant: Herman H. Taylor; Ernest L. Parker
- Preceded by: John M. Haines
- Succeeded by: D. W. Davis

19th & 21st Mayor of Boise
- In office July 13, 1901 – July 18, 1903
- Preceded by: J. H. Richards
- Succeeded by: James H. Hawley
- In office July 15, 1897 – July 13, 1899
- Preceded by: Walter E. Pierce
- Succeeded by: J. H. Richards

Personal details
- Born: November 13, 1853 Obrigheim, Bavaria (now Germany)
- Died: January 4, 1932 (aged 78) Boise, Idaho, U.S.
- Party: Democratic
- Spouse: Helena Kaestner
- Children: 4

Moses Alexander (November 13, 1853 – January 4, 1932) was an American businessman and politician who served as the 11th governor of Idaho, the second elected Jewish governor of a U.S. state, and the first who actually practiced that religion. Jewish California Governor Washington Bartlett was elected in 1886, but converted to Christianity shortly before his death in office in 1887. Moses Alexander served from 1915 until 1919, and remains the state's sole Jewish chief executive.

== Early life and career ==
Born in Obrigheim, then in the Kingdom of Bavaria to a Jewish family. Alexander emigrated to the United States in 1867 and settled in New York City.

== Career ==
After moving to the United States, Alexander accepted an invitation from his cousin in Chillicothe, Missouri, where he showed a talent for the business and was made a partner in the store in 1874.

In Chillicothe, Alexander showed an early interest in Democratic politics, particularly within the progressive wing of the party. In 1886, he was elected to the Chillicothe City Council. The next year, Alexander was elected mayor and served two terms. His primary concern as mayor was addressing the city's dire financial situation.

In 1891, Alexander left Chillicothe with the intention of moving to Alaska. While en route, he made a stop in Idaho at Boise to look at its investment opportunities. Based on that, he abandoned his plans in Alaska and settled in Boise instead. In July 1891, Alexander opened the first of several clothing stores, Alexanders, in Boise and nearby communities.

In 1895, Alexander led an effort to build the Ahavath Beth Israel, the first synagogue in Idaho. Completed 130 years ago in 1896, it is the oldest in continuous use west of the Mississippi River.

=== Mayor of Boise ===
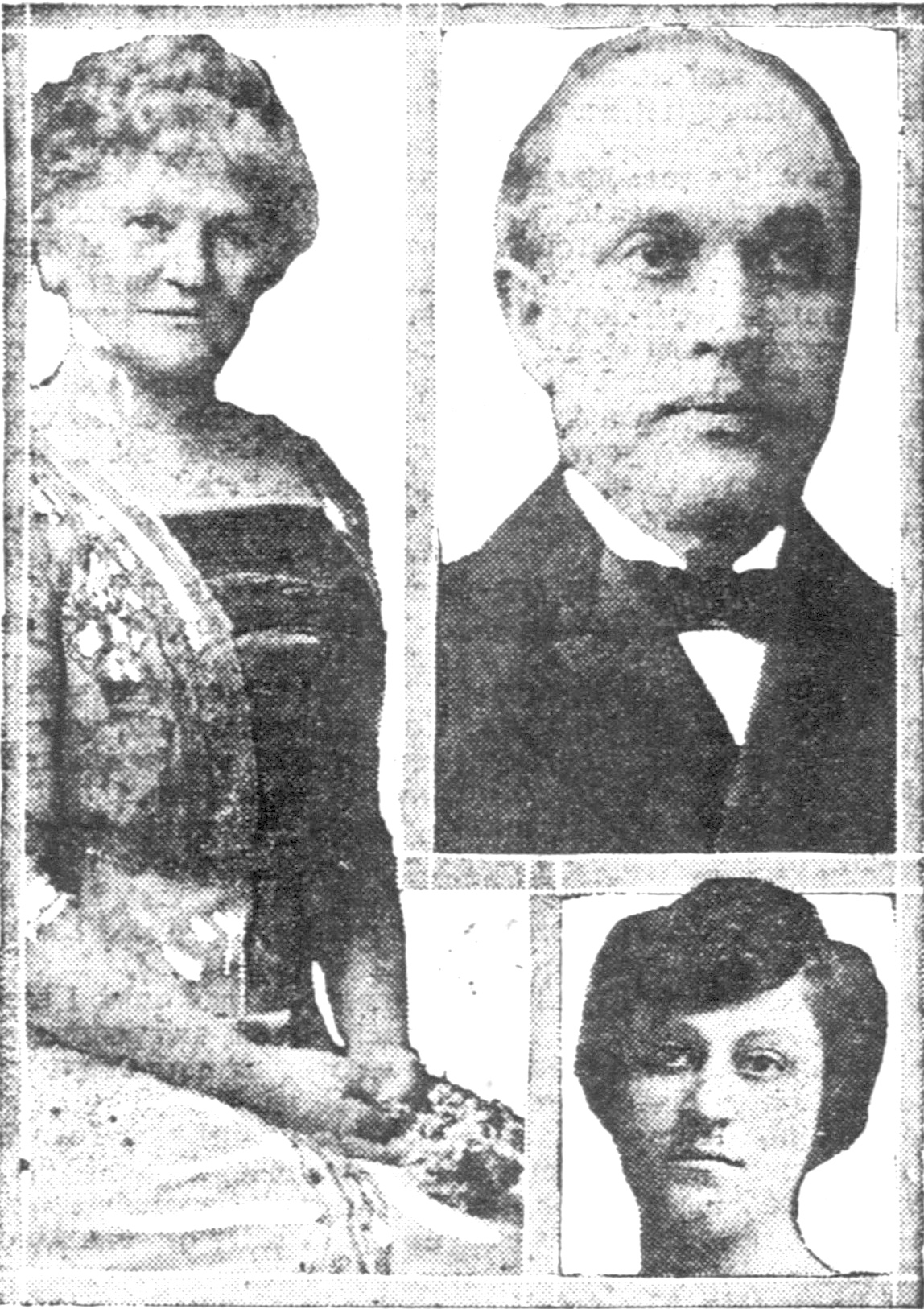
Moses Alexander (right), his wife Helena Kaestner Alexander (left) and their daughter Leha (bottom) in 1915.

In 1897, Alexander was elected mayor of Boise. He chose not to run for reelection in 1899, but was elected again in 1901. During his terms as mayor, Boise's volunteer fire department was reorganized into a professional body, anti-gambling ordinances were passed and other city improvements were made.

=== Governor of Idaho ===
==== Election ====
In 1908, Alexander was declared the Democratic nominee for governor in a bitterly contested nomination process which required intervention by the Idaho Supreme Court. However, he was defeated in the general election by Republican nominee James H. Brady. Alexander was offered the nomination again in 1910, but declined due to poor health.

In 1914, Alexander entered the gubernatorial race on a platform strongly supporting prohibition and limited government spending. Alexander won the general election with a 44% plurality against Republican incumbent John M. Haines, thanks, in part, to a misappropriation scandal in the state treasurer's office that dogged the Republican ticket. He thus became the first observant Jew to be elected governor of a U.S. state. (Washington Bartlett, governor of California in 1887, had a Jewish mother but did not practice Judaism himself.)

In 1916, Alexander was re-elected over his Republican opponent, D. W. Davis, by only 572 votes, the closest gubernatorial election in Idaho history.

==== Tenure ====
Upon taking office, Alexander set to work immediately on making Idaho a dry state. Alexander continued to be an ardent prohibition supporter even though bootlegging became common practice in Idaho in the ensuing years.

World War I was another central issue during Alexander's administration. Alexander pledged state militia troops to both the war cause and to the Mexican Expedition against Pancho Villa and ordered a home guard (Idaho State Guard) into service to protect Idaho. Despite rampant anti-German hysteria in Idaho during the period, Alexander himself was never thought of as unpatriotic, even though he was born in present-day Germany.

Several labor laws were also introduced during Alexander's time as governor.

=== Later years ===
Alexander did not run for re-election in 1918. He was the Democratic nominee for governor again in 1922, but was not able to campaign as vigorously as he had before. That year, Alexander finished third in the general election behind Republican Charles C. Moore and Progressive H. F. Samuels.

Throughout the 1920s, Alexander remained active with the Idaho Democratic Party as a speaker and delegate to Democratic National Conventions.

== Personal life ==
In 1876, Alexander married Helena (née Hedwig) Kaestner (1853–1949), a Christian immigrant from Germany who converted to Judaism. Together, they had a daughter, Leha Alexander Spiro (1885–1979).

He made his last public appearance for the Democrats on December 29, 1931, less than a week before his death in Boise. Alexander and his wife are buried in Morris Hill Cemetery in Boise.

== See also ==
- List of United States governors born outside the United States
- Alexander House listed on the National Register of Historic Places

Political offices
Preceded by W. E. Pierce	Mayor of Boise; 1897–1899	Succeeded by J. H. Richards
Preceded by J. H. Richards	Mayor of Boise; 1901–1903	Succeeded by James H. Hawley
Preceded by John M. Haines	Governor of Idaho; 1915–1919	Succeeded by D. W. Davis
Party political offices
Preceded by Charles Stockslager	Democratic nominee Governor of Idaho; 1908	Succeeded by James H. Hawley
Preceded by James H. Hawley	Democratic nominee Governor of Idaho; 1914, 1916	Succeeded by H. F. Samuels
Preceded by Ted Walters	Democratic nominee Governor of Idaho; 1922	Succeeded by A. L. Freehafer
