= 1930 Idaho gubernatorial election =

- November 4, 1930
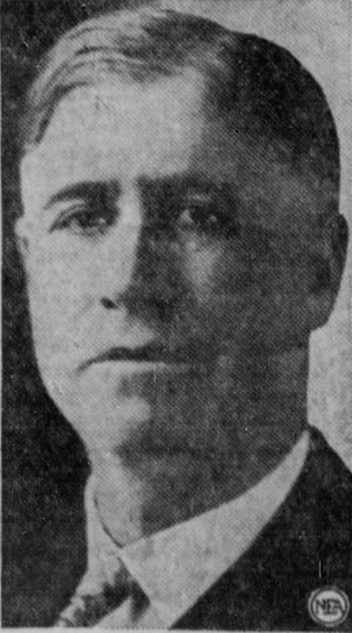

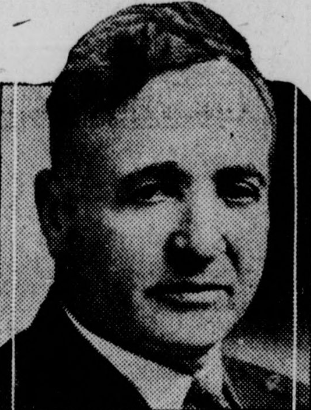
Nominee	C. Ben Ross	John McMurray
Party	Democratic	Republican
Popular vote	73,896	58,002
Percentage	56.03%	43.98%
- County results Ross: 50–60% 60–70% 70–80% McMurray: 50–60% 60–70% 70–80%
Governor before election
H. C. Baldridge
Republican
Elected Governor
C. Ben Ross
Democratic

The 1930 Idaho gubernatorial election was held on November 4. Democratic nominee C. Ben Ross, mayor of Pocatello, defeated Republican nominee John McMurray with 56.03% of the vote. Ross' victory broke a streak of six consecutive election wins (1918–28) by Republicans; he was re-elected in 1932 and 1934.

== General election ==
=== Candidates ===
- C. Ben Ross, Democratic
- John McMurray, Republican

=== Results ===
1930 Idaho gubernatorial election
Party	Candidate	Votes	%	±%
Democratic	C. Ben Ross	73,896	56.03%	
Republican	John McMurray	58,002	43.98%	
Majority		15,894		
Turnout				
Democratic gain from Republican		Swing		
