= District 208 =

- The main entrance in 2006
- Location: Nampa, Idaho, United States
- Coordinates: 43.601279°N 116.601076°W
- Opened: August 26, 1965
- Closed: March 2020 (interior mall)
- Developer: Max Boesiger
- Owner: Rhino Investments
- Num. of anchor tenants: 6 (2 vacant)
- Floor area: 400,000 square feet (37,000 m^{2})
- Floors: 1

District 208, formerly Karcher Mall, is a shopping center located in Nampa, Idaho, United States. It originally opened as an enclosed shopping mall in August 1965 with Buttrey Food & Drug, Tempo, and Sprouse-Reitz as anchor stores. It was the largest shopping mall in the Treasure Valley until the opening of Boise Towne Square in Boise in October 1988. The shopping center is anchored by Big 5 Sporting Goods, Boot Barn, Mor Furniture, and Ross.

In 2019, the mall was sold to Rhino Investments, which began a major renovation project that included the demolition of 81,000 square feet (7,500 m^{2}) of the mall's floor area. Future plans include the addition of several new tenants and several residential buildings.

== History ==
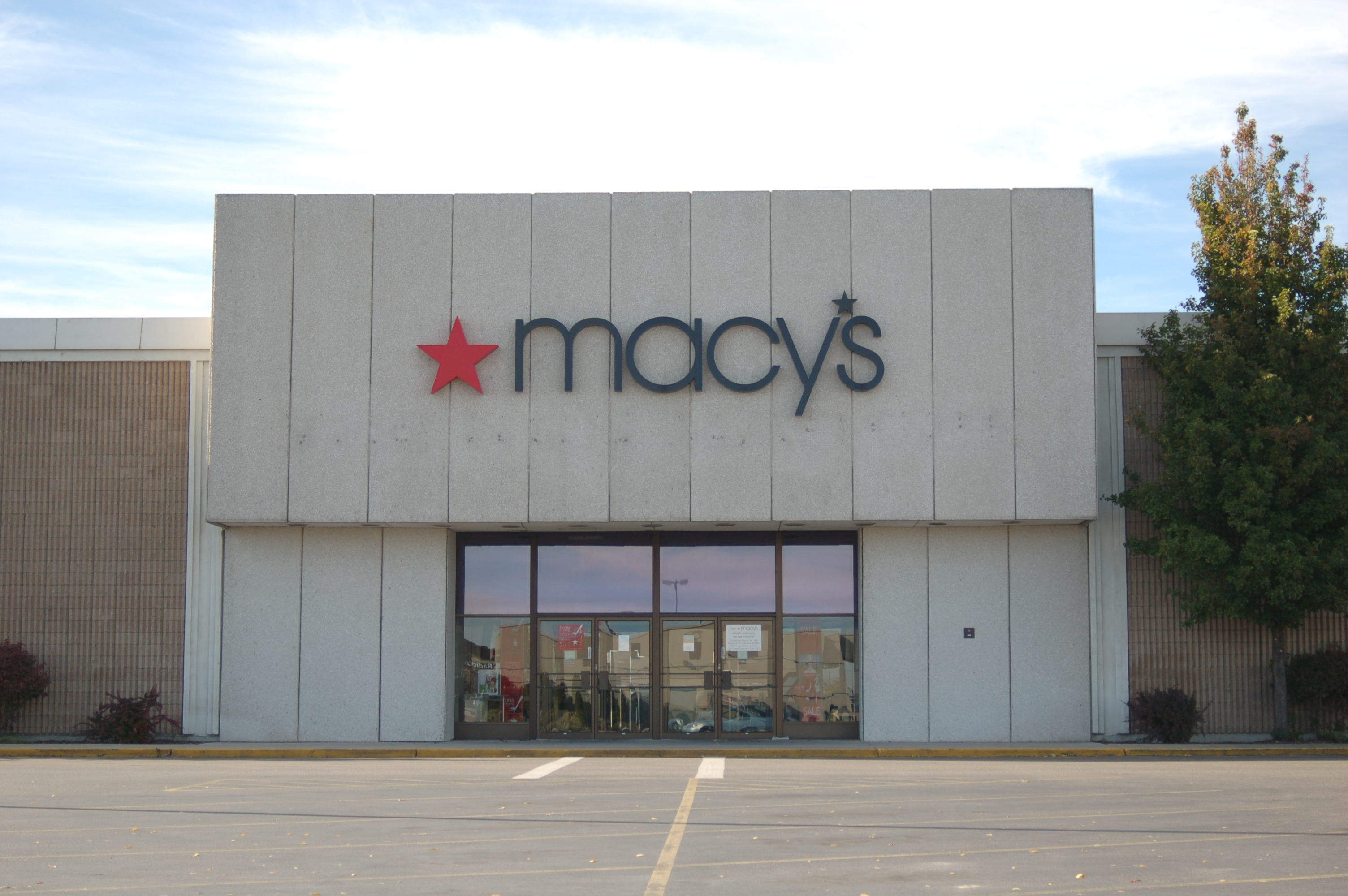
The exterior of the mall's now-closed Macy's (formerly The Bon Marché) store in 2009.

Daum Industries began construction on a former alfalfa field located at the intersection of Karcher Road and U.S. Highway 30 in 1963. The mall was completed and opened on August 26, 1965 with anchor stores Buttrey Food & Drug, Tempo, and Portland, Oregon-based Sprouse-Reitz. During 1967, Daum Industries persuaded JCPenney to open a department store at the two-year-old shopping center. In March 1967, construction on a $3.5 million expansion of the shopping mall began, with a finish date set for March 1968. The new expansion added 259,000-square-foot (24,100 m^{2}) of new retail space to the shopping center, including the new JCPenney store and a Skaggs Drug Centers store. Following the opening of the new Karcher Mall store, JCPenney shuttered four nearby stores in downtown Nampa, Caldwell, Emmett, and Payette.

The mall was expanded even more, which opened on August 3, 1973, adding two more department stores, including Boise, Idaho-based Falk's I.D. Store and Seattle, Washington-based The Bon Marché, and a two-screen theater, Karcher Twin Theaters. A free-standing Ernst hardware store was added in late 1976. In late 1981, Tempo vacated the mall with the space being converted to a Woolworth department store in March 1982. In July 1983, Buttrey announced the closure of the Karcher Mall location.

In 1986, Karcher Mall featured 74 businesses when it was sold from Daum Industries to Los Angeles-based Standard Management Co. for about $14 million. During the same year, Falk's I.D. Store shut its remaining 55 stores. Falk's I.D. Store sold two locations, including the store at the mall, to Anthony's. In 1987, the mall underwent a $1 million renovation. The former Buttrey store was split into two smaller anchor tenants with Discount Furniture, and House of Fabrics.

=== Decline in the 1990s and 2000s ===
In October 1988, Boise Towne Square opened in nearby Boise. Karcher Mall lost its biggest retailer, when JCPenney store closed its 20-year-old location to relocate to the new mall. The mall was able to quickly fill the vacant space with Eugene, Oregon-based Troutman's Emporium In late 1990, Sears relocated its catalog and appliance store in Caldwell to the mall, taking over space vacated by PayLess Drug in January 1989.

During the 1990s, the mall lost four anchor stores: Anthony's (1991) Ernst Home Centers (November 1996), Woolworth (July 1997), and The Hub Clothing (1998).

In May 1998, Karcher Partners LLC, composed of Tarrytown, New York-based DLC Management Corp. and Dallas, Texas-based Benton Companies, bought Karcher Mall for a reported $10.9 million. That same year, House of Fabrics was acquired by Fabri-Center, and was rebranded into Jo-Ann Fabrics. In 1999, Karcher Partners LLC announced a $10 million renovation of the Karcher Mall that was started in September of that year. The face lift of the declining shopping center included new storefronts, new flooring and lighting, and a new main entrance. Initial plans for the renovation included adding a new anchor store into the upper level of Emporium, which had been used for warehouse space, and a food court; however, neither of these occurred. During this period, the mall added Intermountain Sports and Liquidation World to fill the empty spaces left by Woolworth and Ernst respectively.

Despite the major renovations, the mall began losing more retailers and customers. Nampa Furniture (which was originally known as Discount Furniture until 1990, and Idaho Furniture Mart until 1991) relocated to a larger building across the street formerly operated by Waremart Foods (now WinCo Foods) in September 1999. The mall's movie theater was shut down in February 2000 after its owner, Reel Theatres, relocated to a larger movie theater across the street previously operated by Cineplex Odeon. Short-lived anchor, Intermountain Sports left the mall abruptly in 2001, though it was quickly replaced by variety retailer U.S. Factory Outlets by the end of the year. Just one month after losing Intermountain Sports, Sears relocated to a newly constructed shopping center north of the Karcher Mall. Shortly after, Jo-Ann Fabrics relocated to the former space left by Sears. In late 2001, Ross Dress for Less were added to the former two anchor tenants left by the former Jo-Ann Fabrics and Nampa Furniture, and drywall the interior access from the mall.

In 2003, Emporium, the mall largest tenant, was forced to close after its parent company, the Troutman Company, couldn't secure a new financing package or sell the stores after a Chapter 11 bankruptcy filing in 2002. Costco Wholesale, Home Depot, and other big-box chains expressed interest in space at the mall but were turned down as the chains had "unrealistic expectations as to what they could do with the mall." Shortly after Emporium's closure, Big 5 Sporting Goods was added to the mall in the former smaller tenants close to Ross, but like Ross, they drywall the interior access as well. In March 2004, the mall had 172,693-square-foot (16,043.7 m^{2}) of empty retail space according to a real estate report released by Gunstream Commercial Real Estate.

=== New owners; 2007 renovation ===
In 2004, Karcher Mall was sold to LB Nampa Mall Holdings LLC. The new owners hired Jones Lang LaSalle, a real estate services firm with offices in Chicago, to manage the mall and help attract new retailers to fill the mall's many vacant stores. In 2005, the mall was sold once more to Chicago-based Baum Bros. LLC and again two months later to Anaheim, California-based Milan Properties LLC. Milan Properties announced plans to remodel the 40-year-old mall and fill the long-vacant Emporium anchor with a new department store. Milan Properties also hoped that the new Interstate 84 Interchange and the new nearby Treasure Valley Marketplace would help bring more traffic to the mall. In 2007, Burlington Coat Factory, filling the former Emporium space, was the first new major retailer added to the newly renovated mall. In early 2008, clothing retailer Steve & Barry's replaced the former U.S. Factory Outlets store, which closed in 2005; however, 11 months later the store was closed when Steve & Barry's liquidated.

During 2008, Macy's, which previously operated as The Bon Marché until 2003 and Bon-Macy's until 2005, announced plans to shutter its Karcher Mall location to relocate to the newly constructed Nampa Gateway Center in late 2009. The new Macy's at the Nampa Gateway Center opened on October 17. In September 2009, Northern Light Cinema Grill, an independently owned movie theater and restaurant, opened in the long-vacant Nampa Reel Theatres building. In July 2014, Macy's announced the closure of the mall's clearance center. In Spring 2016, Karcher Mall announced the opening of the new Mor Furniture store, filling the former Macy's space. Mor Furniture opened on June 16, 2016. In 2018, Burlington announced the closure of the mall's location to relocate to nearby Treasure Valley Crossing in late 2018. In the recent years, poor maintenance of the mall and poor ownership, as well as increased rental expenses were the major factors of the high vacancy rate and national chains being pulled away from Karcher Mall.

=== 2019-2022 renovations ===
In May 2019, the mall was sold to Livermore, California-based Rhino Investments. In July 2019, plans were unveiled for a renovation project that include the demolition of 81,000 square feet (7,500 m^{2}) of the mall's floor area. Several new tenants will be added to the shopping center as well as nine residential buildings with 216 apartments. Several mall tenants, including anchor stores Big 5 Sporting Goods, Jo-Ann Fabrics, Mor Furniture, and Ross, will remain part of the shopping center after demolition is completed. Construction for revamped shopping center, renamed Karcher Marketplace, began in November 2019. However, the construction was temporarily halted in early 2020 due to the COVID-19 pandemic. As of May 2020, the rest of the mall concourses were closed off for plans to reconstruct the interiors into big-box stores, but a few remaining mall tenants including Jo-Ann Fabrics, and Discount Furniture (which was recently relocated to the former Burlington space) remained open with exterior access.

In February 2022, Rhino announced the redevelopment of the former Karcher Mall to be named District 208. The construction resumed in late January of that year after a nearly two year delay. The rear parking lot broke ground for new apartments and storage units.

On May 30, 2025, Jo-Ann Fabrics shuttered its store after the chain filed for Chapter 11 bankruptcy and liquidated the stores. In September 2026, Discount Furniture announced the store's closure and liquidation. As of October 2026, District 208 is occupied by Big 5 Sporting Goods, Boot Barn, Mor Furniture, and Ross Dress for Less. On October 27, 2026, supermarket chain Natural Grocers announced they would open its new District 208 location, totaling up to 5 tenants.
