= Boise Towne Square =

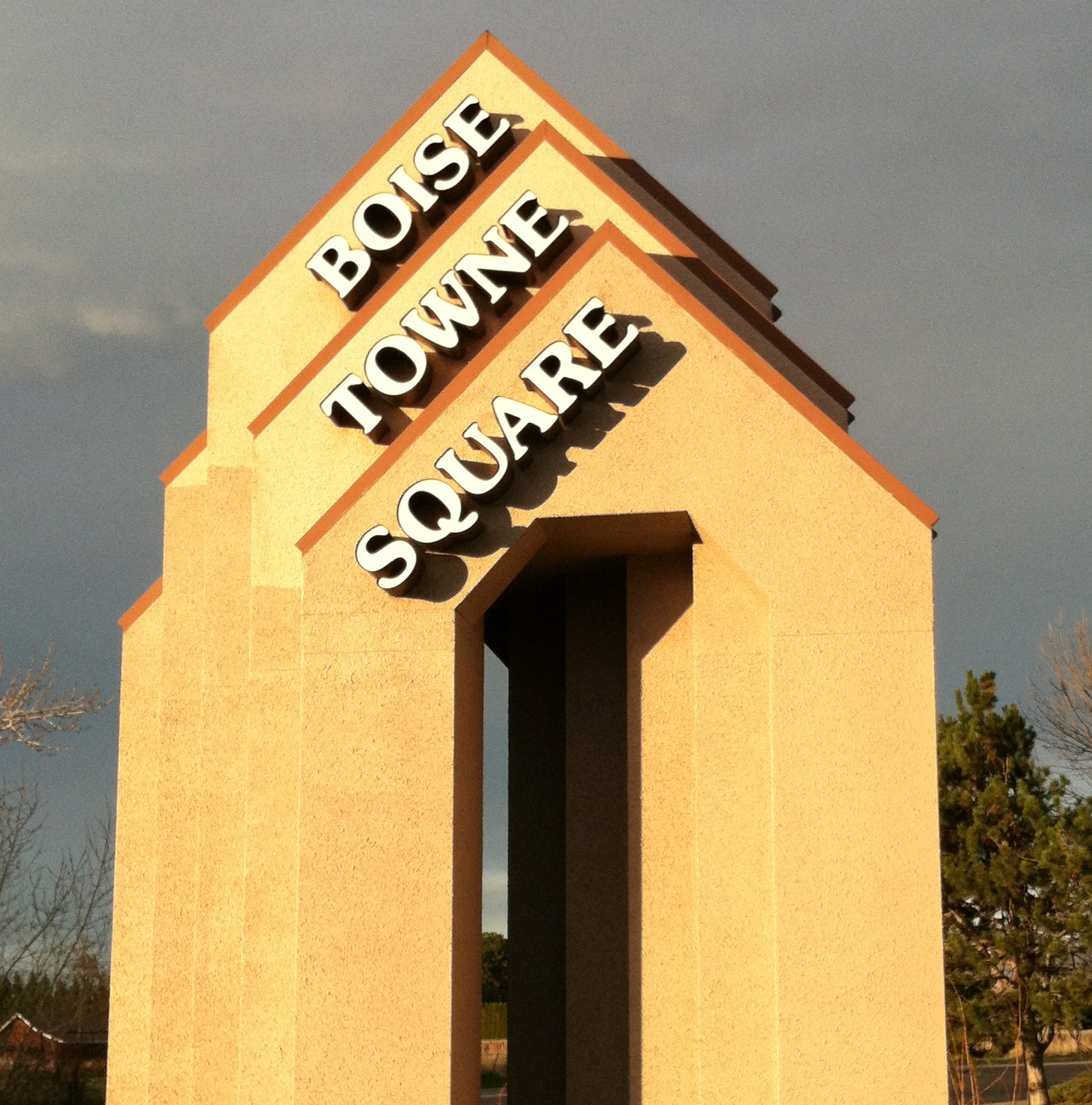
- A former road sign at Boise Town Square
- Location: Boise, Idaho
- Coordinates: 43°36′30″N 116°16′40″W
- Opened: 1988; 38 years ago October 19 (remaining stores)
- Developer: Sletten Companies
- Manager: GGP
- Owner: GGP
- Num. of stores: 150
- Num. of anchor tenants: 5 (3 open, 2 vacant) (Boise Towne Square Mall); 2 (Boise Towne Plaza)
- Floor area: 1,057,954 sq ft (98,287.1 m^{2})
- Floors: 2 (3 in Dillard's)
- Website: boisetownesquare.com

Location in the United States
Location in Idaho

Boise Towne Square is a mall in the Western United States, located in Boise, Idaho. The largest retail complex in the state, it opened in 1988 after more than 20 years of planning, and features 150 stores, with Macy's (formerly The Bon Marché), JCPenney, and Dillard's (added in 1998) as anchor stores. The mall also includes the first Apple Store in Idaho. Boise Towne Square is owned by the Chicago-based GGP, a subsidiary of Brookfield Properties, and is located near the junction of Interstate 84 and Interstate 184.

GGP also operates an adjacent strip mall, Boise Towne Plaza, which is anchored by Dave & Buster's, Nordstrom Rack, Old Navy, and Ulta Beauty. In addition, the mall comprises nine freestanding businesses on its property, including PetSmart.

== History ==
=== Plans for mall in Boise ===
The idea for a large regional shopping mall for Boise had been in discussion during the 1960s and 1970s. The first major proposal came in 1973, when Karcher Mall developer Harry Daum attempted to purchase land, owned by Larry and Peg Ott, near the intersection of Cole and Franklin Roads in Boise. The Otts responded with a lawsuit to stop Daum from attempting the building a shopping mall on their property. In 1976, the Otts agreed not to protest developer Larry Leasure's efforts to get the shopping center site annexed and zoned for commercial use. In return, they agreed to the let the property be developed as a community shopping center and office buildings, not a regional shopping mall. In 1978, another unsuccessful purchase attempt of the property was led by developer Ernest Hahn.

In the early 1980s, various developers proposed ideas for a shopping mall in and around Boise. This began in 1980, with a mall proposed for nearby Meridian. During the same year, an urban renewal project in downtown Boise was planned to include a large shopping mall with Zions Cooperative Mercantile Institution (ZCMI) as an anchor store. ZCMI backed out of the downtown project in October 1980, and The Bon Marché was added in its place in 1981. The city eventually gave up on the idea of downtown shopping mall.

In 1982, Salt Lake City developer John Price proposed another shopping mall near the intersection of Interstate 84 and Cloverdale Road. Department store chains J. C. Penney, Lamonts, Sears, and ZCMI were committed to anchor the new shopping mall. In December 1982, the Federal Highway Administration approved a $6 million interchange at Cloverdale Road. Price offered to pay for the interchange, which would have advanced the 1990 completion date to 1985 or 1986. Meanwhile, Boise developer Larry Leasure proposed a shopping mall, named Westpark, at the intersection of Cole and Franklin Roads, but the mall was on hold due to zoning and access problems. Price said he might consider dropping the Cloverdale project if Leasure would agree to sell the Westpark site to him when the issues were resolved.

By December 1986, construction began on Boise Towne Square northwest of the intersection of Cole and Franklin Roads, the original site where Harry Daum attempted to build a shopping mall 13 years earlier. Within the next year, it was announced that Sears, JCPenney, Mervyns and The Bon Marché would be the new mall's anchor stores. Sears, JCPenney and The Bon Marché were operating locations in downtown Boise, and the latter two stores were also anchors at the Karcher Mall in nearby Nampa, the only mall in the area at the time. After Boise Towne Square opened, Karcher Mall would lose business to Boise Towne Square.

=== Opening ===
In September 1988, Sears and JCPenney both began to liquidate their downtown locations in preparation to open in the new mall. At the time JCPenney also liquidated their Karcher Mall location in Nampa and sold the location to Troutman's Emporium. The Bon Marché, however, planned to keep its downtown location for at least a year but eventually stayed until the chain's demise in 2005 when the company's name was converted to Macy's. Macy's operated the downtown location for five more years before closing in 2010 after declining sales.

After much anticipation, the mall's first anchors, The Bon Marché and Sears, opened their doors on October 9, 1988 at 10 a.m. Kim Clark, advertising and special events coordinator for The Bon Marché, estimated that 10,000 people from the area would visit the store's grand opening. The mall's third anchor, JCPenney, opened its doors on October 12, the same day JCPenney closed its downtown Boise location, which it had operated since 1932. The mall's formal grand opening occurred on October 19. The mall's grand opening included a ribbon cutting ceremony with then mayor of Boise, Dirk Kempthorne. The mall's fourth anchor, Hayward, California-based Mervyn's, opened in February 1989.

In September 1989, ZCMI made plans to open two ZCMI II stores in Boise, including a location at Boise Towne Square, but neither were built.

=== 1995–1998 expansions ===
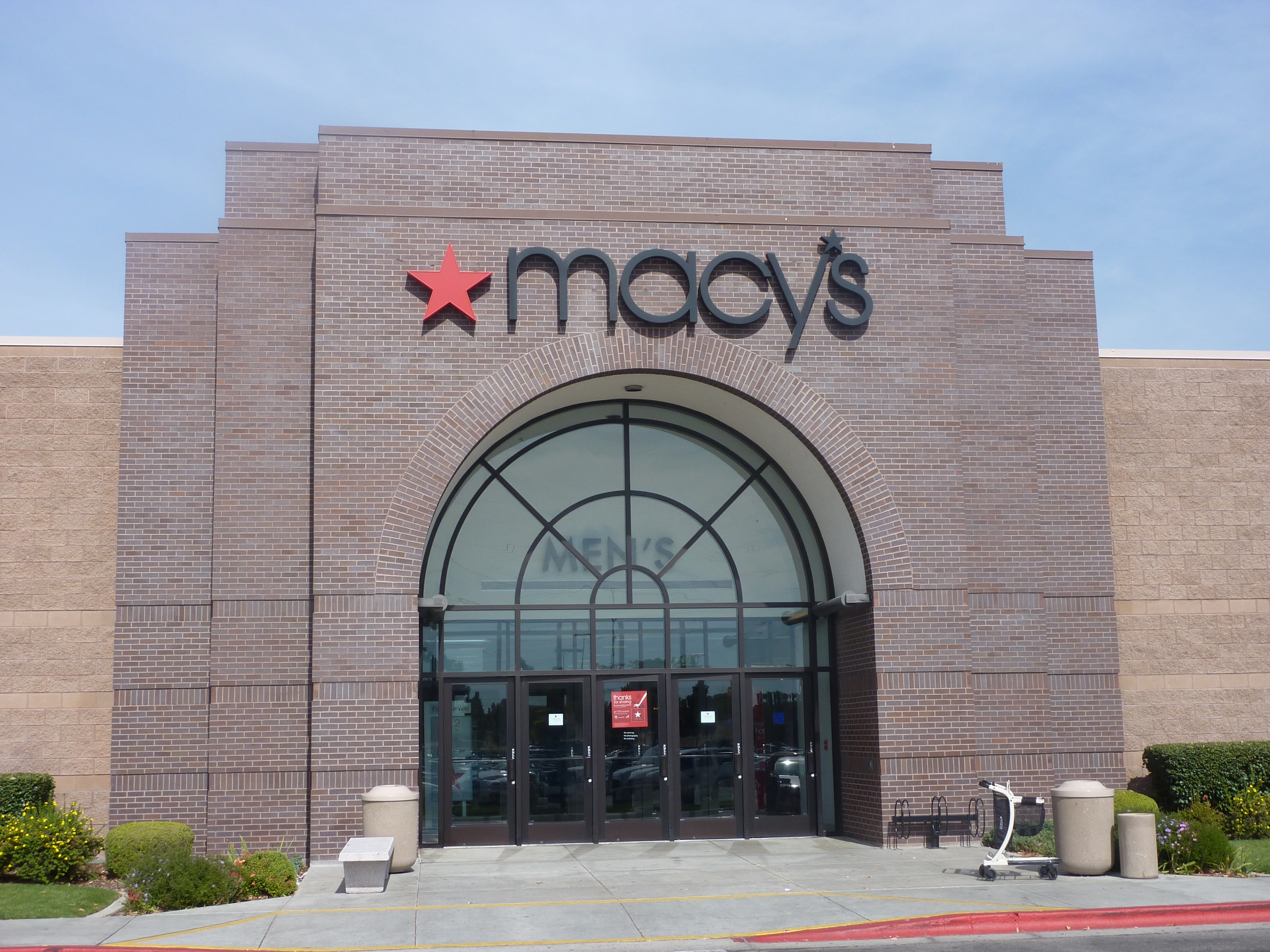
Macy's (previously The Bon Marché) at Boise Towne Square Mall in 2010.

In November 1995, the mall officially announced plans for a major expansion that would bring a fifth anchor store to the mall. Among the retailers rumored for the fifth anchor spot were Dillard's and ZCMI. Richard Madsen, president of ZCMI, confirmed JP Realty had drawn expansion plans with Dillard's listed as the fifth anchor Despite this, Rex Frazier, president of JP Realty, confirmed the company was talking with Dillard's, but would not confirm any business arrangements.

Also in November, The Bon Marché began a two-phase expansion of its store at mall. Phase one of the expansion included renovating a 8,000-square-foot (740 m^{2}) space vacated in December 1994 by Lamonts for Kids; the second phase was a 40,000 sq ft (3,700 m^{2}) addition.

In February 1996, Dillard's was officially confirmed as the mall's fifth and largest anchor store. In addition to the new store, a new 60,000 sq ft (5,570 m^{2}) addition of new retail space was set to be built south of the new Dillard's store. Three months later, plans for the expansion were put on hold when the mall was sued by The Bon Marché. The Bon claimed the addition of Dillard's is a twofold violation of The Bon's lease, which states that consent is required before physical changes can be made to the mall. The lawsuit was settled in January 1997 and plans for the 344,838 sq ft (32,036 m^{2}) expansion were approved by the Boise Design Review Committee. Construction on the expansion and the Dillard's store began in June, with Dillard's opening and most of the mall's new stores opening in August 1998. In an interview with the Idaho Statesman, the chairman of JP Realty revealed he hopes to eventually add a sixth anchor tenant and parking garages to mall.

=== More expansions; closure of theater ===
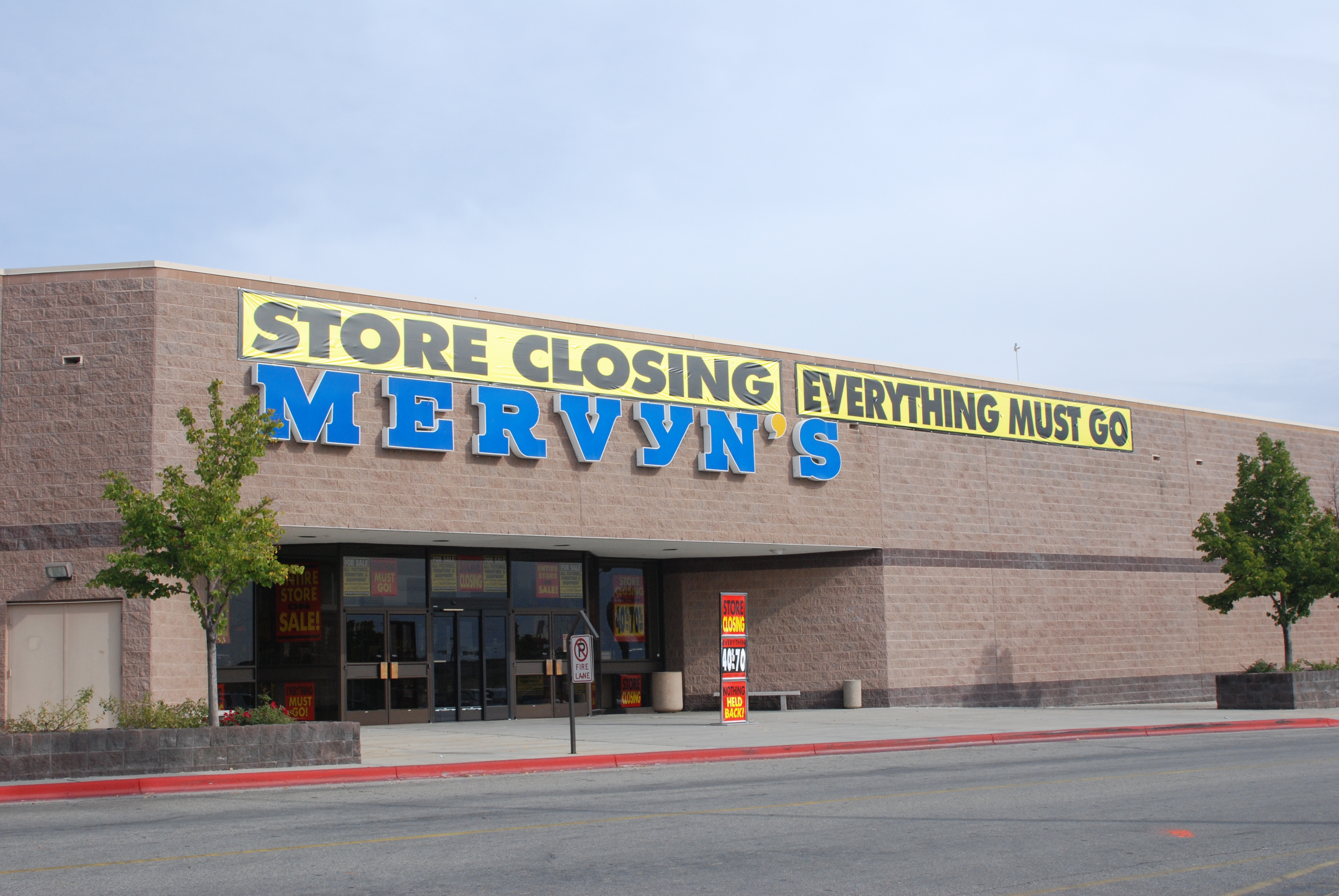
Mervyns at Boise Towne Square Mall during its store closing sale in 2008. A Kohl's department store moved into the space in September 2011.

During 1999, the mall completed a five-month, $1 million remodel of the food court.

In 2001, Loews Cineplex announced the closure of three Treasure Valley theaters, including the mall's theater. The movie theater, which previously operated as a Cineplex Odeon until its 1998 merger with Loews, was opened in 1988.

The empty theater was reopened by local movie theater chain, The Reel Theatre, in December 2004. The Reel Theatre shut down the Boise Towne Square location in 2007 after a major renovation of a nearby location. The mall's theater remained vacant until it was demolished in October 2009 for a PetSmart store. The PetSmart store opened in 2010 after relocating from an older location nearby.

In 2006, the mall was expanded to add 35,000 sq ft (3,250 m^{2}) of retail space. The expansion's first new tenants included Borders, which relocated from an older location nearby, and The Cheesecake Factory. The expansion also added Talbots, which relocated from its 19-year-old Parkcenter Mall location, in October 2007. An interior renovation was completed in October 2008. The 2007 expansion has made Boise Towne Square the largest mall in Idaho, with more than 180 stores.

=== 2008 to present ===
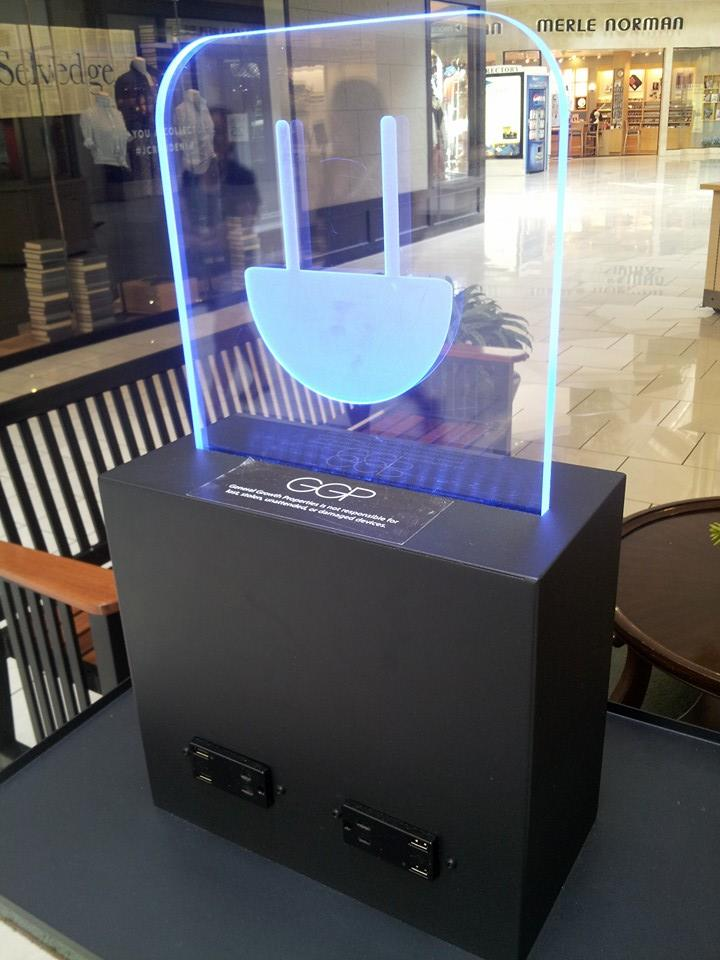
One of several smartphone charging stations at the mall.

In August 2008, long-time anchor Mervyns announced it would close its location in the mall in late early November 2008, as part of the company's Chapter 11 bankruptcy reorganization. A contractor bidding announcement confirmed Kohl's was planning a store at the Boise Towne Square Mall in the former Mervyns building. Construction on the new Kohl's store began March 1 and was completed September 27, 2011.

On February 9, 2009, local police were forced to evacuate the mall after several suspicious devices were found, a first for the 20-year-old shopping mall. At least 2,000 customers and employees were in the mall when it was evacuated. Boise police and federal law enforcement located what were discovered to be fake explosives in several different locations in the mall. The mall reopened at its regular time the following day.

It was announced in February 2010, Apple Inc. had chosen the mall for Idaho's first Apple Store location. The new store was opened on September 11, 2010. In January 2011, Nordstrom announced it was considering the Boise Towne Square Mall as a location for Idaho's first Nordstrom Rack.

On February 16, 2011, Borders Group filed for Chapter 11 bankruptcy protection and the closure of 200 of its 642 bookstores. The mall's location was not included in the closure list released by the company. The mall's owner has requested to appear in the Borders bankruptcy case, in order to represent their interests. On July 18, 2011, Borders announced it would liquidate and close its remaining 399 stores. The store closed on September 13, 2011. Less than a year later, H&M announced plans to open its first Idaho store in the vacant Borders space.

On October 15, 2018, it was announced that Sears would be closing as part of a plan to close 142 stores nationwide. The store closed in January 2019.

On January 9, 2025, Kohl's announced it will close its store as part of a plan to close 27 stores nationwide. The store closed on March 29, 2025.

== October 2021 shooting ==
2021 Boise Towne Square shooting
- Location: Boise, Idaho, United States
- Date: October 25, 2021
- Attack type: Mass shooting
- Weapons: 9mm Heckler & Koch VP9; 9mm Glock 19 (unused); .22-caliber Beretta 21A (unused)
- Deaths: 3 (including the perpetrator)
- Injuries: 4
- Perpetrator: Jacob James Bergquist

On October 25, 2021, two people were killed and four others were injured, including a Boise Police Department officer, after a shooting occurred in the mall.

=== Perpetrator ===
The gunman was identified as 27-year-old Jacob James Bergquist, a former resident of Chicago, where he was previously convicted of a felony. After a exchanging fire with police outside the mall, Bergquist reportedly took cover behind a nearby dumpster where officers heard another shot fired. He died in the hospital the next day from a gunshot wound to the head. The coroner later determined that the wound was self-inflicted.

Three handguns were found on Bergquist’s person: a 9mm Heckler & Koch VP9, a 9mm Glock 19, and a .22-caliber Beretta 21A. Only the VP9 was used in the shooting.

After the shooting, authorities searched Bergquist’s home and found four additional firearms: a North American Arms .22 Magnum revolver, a Heckler & Koch USP .45-caliber pistol, a Smith & Wesson 5906 9mm pistol and a SIG Sauer P320 .45-caliber pistol.

=== Victims ===
One of the two people killed was Jo Acker, a 26-year-old transgender woman who was working as a mall security guard at the time of the shooting. At 1:50 p.m., Acker radioed that she was contacting someone with a weapon. Security footage shows her approaching Bergquist outside the entrance to Macy's on the first floor. According to the police report, the two spoke for approximately 20 seconds, and the interaction "appeared cordial at first and nothing is out of the ordinary." Bergquist then began to walk away then quickly turned and shot Acker four times. She was the first person killed in the shooting and died at the scene.

After his encounter with Acker, the gunman fired more shots into the mall. Roberto Padilla Arguelles, 49, was the second person killed in the shooting. After the shooting, reports detailed Bergquist's previous encounters with police. Arguelles's family later filed a notice of tort claim, alleging that authorities knew Bergquist was a "heightened risk" to the community.

=== Motive ===
While no clear motive was ever determined by the police, investigators noted that Bergquist maintained a YouTube channel containing 'very racist' videos targeting Hispanic groups. In a phone call made to a relative seconds after shooting Acker, Bergquist stated he had "just killed or shot a lot of people" and that his family was to blame. The relative recalled that Bergquist was "breathing heavily and mumbling" during the call, and said the word "transgender." The significance of the remark was not established.

== Boise Towne Plaza ==
During late 1997, JP Realty Inc., owner of the mall during the 1990s, began construction on a 107,500-square-foot (9,990 m^{2}) shopping center in a 10-acre (40,000 m^{2}) area adjacent to the mall, called Boise Towne Plaza. The shopping center's initial anchors were Circuit City and Linens 'n Things. An additional anchor, Old Navy, was later added on. A 1999 expansion added Hallmark and Famous Footwear. Linens 'n Things announced it would liquidate and close its remaining stores in October 2008. On January 16, 2009, it was announced that Circuit City would also liquidate and close remaining stores. On March 31, 2011, Nordstrom confirmed that Idaho's first Nordstrom Rack would open at the former Linens 'n Things building. The store opened on April 12, 2012.

On April 12, 2012, at the grand opening of Nordstrom Rack, a mall spokesperson confirmed that retailer Ulta Beauty would open in one half of the former Circuit City building. On April 23, 2012, it was confirmed that restaurant chain Dave & Buster's would open in the remaining space left in the former Circuit City building.

== See also ==
- District 208, formerly Karcher Mall, the Treasure Valley's oldest shopping mall located in Nampa; opened 1965
- Nampa Gateway Center, a lifestyle center located in Nampa; opened 2007
