= Palouse Mall =

Palouse Place
- Location: Moscow, Idaho, U.S.
- Coordinates: 46.734°N 117.030°W
- Address: 1850 West Pullman Road
- Opened: 1976, 50 years ago
- Developer: Earl D. McCarthy
- Owner: Jameson Commercial Property Management, LLC
- Num. of anchor tenants: 7
- Floor area: 400,000 square feet (37,000 m^{2})
- Floors: 1
- Parking: 2,170 spaces
- Website: palousemall.com

Palouse Place (previously Palouse Mall and Palouse Empire Mall) is an enclosed shopping mall in the western United States, located in Moscow, Idaho. Opened in 1976, the mall is anchored by Michael's, Old Navy, Ross Stores, Target, Ashley HomeStore, and WinCo Foods.

The site is on the western edge of the city, near the state border with Washington. It is fronted by Pullman Road, State Highway 8, which becomes State Route 270 in Washington and connects to Pullman, the other chief city on the Palouse, seven miles (11 km) west.

== History ==
Grading of the property began in October 1974; the first stores to open at the site were, from the east end, Kmart, Rosauers, and Pay 'n Save (later PayLess, then Rite Aid, now vacant) drugstore, all in 1976. The mall had been in development since 1964, and the land on which it was built was leased from the University of Idaho. The land was previously owned and farmed by the Mix family for several generations. Developer Earl D. McCarthy died in 1979, and the ownership of the mall went to his children, Madeline Edgren and Mike McCarthy. The main enclosed portion of the mall opened October 1979, featuring J. C. Penney and The Bon Marché (now Macy's) department stores, and Lamonts opened August 1980.

Throughout the 1990s and into the early 2000s, the mall underwent several changes in anchor stores. Rosauers became Excell Foods in 1990, but was gone by 1992, then Price Connection, which closed in 1995. After closing in 1995, the Kmart space was expanded by 13,000 square feet (1,200 m^{2}) on its east end and converted to Waremart, now known as WinCo Foods. A year later, the mall structure itself underwent a renovation, held a grand re-opening in November 1997, and dropped the "Empire" from its name. The J. C. Penney store closed in 1998 and became Troutman's Emporium the same year.

An outparcel at the west end originally occupied by Ernst Home Centers became Office Depot and Hastings Entertainment in 1999. Gottschalks purchased the Lamonts chain in 2000. Emporium went out of business in 2003 and its space became Ross Stores two years later. Gottschalks closed in January 2007 and was torn down for Bed Bath & Beyond and Old Navy; Macy's closed in April 2016. In 2016, the Office Depot space became Staples while Hastings Entertainment went out of business. In 2017, the Hastings Entertainment space became Marshalls and Petco.

In September 2020, Target announced plans to open a store in the space vacated by Macy's. The store opened in October 2021.

In 2025, Broad River Retail announced on that it planned to open a new Ashley HomeStore in the mall. The space was purchased and renovated throughout 2025 with an expected opening date in early 2026. The store opened in January, 2026. The new building is 24,683 square feet (2293.1 m²) and offers furniture and décor for bedrooms, dining rooms, living rooms and youth spaces. The location will also include a Sleep Shop with mattresses from several brands.
