= 1936 United States presidential election in Idaho =

- November 3, 1936

Nominee	Franklin D. Roosevelt	Alf Landon
Party	Democratic	Republican
Home state	New York	Kansas
Running mate	John Nance Garner	Frank Knox
Electoral vote	4	0
Popular vote	125,683	66,256
Percentage	62.96%	33.19%
County results
Roosevelt
40–50%
50–60%
60–70%
70–80%
Landon
50–60%
President before election
Franklin D. Roosevelt
Democratic
Elected President
Franklin D. Roosevelt
Democratic

The 1936 United States presidential election in Idaho took place on November 3, 1936, as part of the 1936 United States presidential election. State voters chose four representatives, or electors, to the Electoral College, who voted for president and vice president.

Idaho was won by incumbent President Franklin D. Roosevelt (D–New York) and Vice President John Nance Garner (D–Texas) with 62.96 percent of the popular vote, over Governor Alf Landon (R–Kansas) and running mate Frank Knox (R–Illinois) with 33.19 percent of the popular vote.

Idaho has since become a Republican stronghold; as of 2024, this election marks the last time that Ada County, Canyon County, Gooding County, Jerome County, Lincoln County, Payette County and Twin Falls County would vote for a Democratic presidential nominee, the last time that a Democrat would carry the state by double digits, and the last time that the state would (by margin of victory) vote more Democratic than the nation as a whole.

== Republican nomination ==
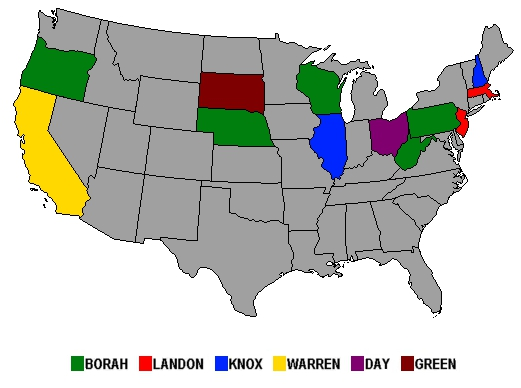
Few states had presidential primaries in 1936. Those won by Borah are in green.

William Borah, the Republican Senator for Idaho ran for the Republican nomination for president in 1936, the first candidate from Idaho to do so.

His candidacy was opposed by the conservative Republican leadership. Borah praised Roosevelt for some of his policies, and deeply criticized the Republican Party. With only 25 Republicans left in the Senate, Borah saw an opportunity to recast the Republican Party along progressive lines, as he had long sought to do. He was opposed by the Republican organization, which sought to dilute his strength in the primaries by running state favorite son candidates in order to ensure a brokered convention. Despite being easily the leading primary vote-getter, Borah managed to win only a handful of delegates and took a majority of them in only one state, Wisconsin, where he had the endorsement of Senator Robert M. La Follette, Jr. Borah refused to endorse the eventual candidate, Kansas Governor Alf Landon (who was nominated at the 1936 Republican National Convention), leading some to believe Borah might cross party lines and support Roosevelt. Ultimately, as he had four years earlier, he chose to endorse neither candidate. Borah was on the ballot that fall in Idaho, seeking a sixth term in the Senate. For the first time since the people had been given the right to elect senators, the Democrats ran a serious candidate against him, Governor C. Ben Ross. Although Idahoans overwhelmingly voted for Roosevelt, who won every state except Maine and Vermont, Borah still took over sixty percent of their votes in his re-election bid.

== Results ==
1936 United States presidential election in Idaho
Party	Candidate	Votes	%
Democratic	Franklin D. Roosevelt (inc.)	125,683	62.96%
Republican	Alf Landon	66,256	33.19%
Union	William Lemke	7,678	3.85%
Total votes		199,617	100%

=== Results by county ===
County	Franklin Delano Roosevelt Democratic		Alfred Mossman Landon Republican		William Frederick Lemke Union		Margin		Total votes cast
County	#	%	#	%	#	%	#	%	Total votes cast
Ada	12,027	58.46%	7,581	36.85%	966	4.70%	4,446	21.61%	20,574
Adams	770	59.41%	434	33.49%	92	7.10%	336	25.93%	1,296
Bannock	9,443	70.51%	3,830	28.60%	120	0.90%	5,613	41.91%	13,393
Bear Lake	2,078	59.61%	1,404	40.28%	4	0.11%	674	19.33%	3,486
Benewah	1,906	65.70%	897	30.92%	98	3.38%	1,009	34.78%	2,901
Bingham	4,215	62.42%	2,354	34.86%	184	2.72%	1,861	27.56%	6,753
Blaine	1,361	64.59%	735	34.88%	11	0.52%	626	29.71%	2,107
Boise	780	65.55%	368	30.92%	42	3.53%	412	34.62%	1,190
Bonner	3,521	58.75%	2,016	33.64%	456	7.61%	1,505	25.11%	5,993
Bonneville	5,439	69.85%	2,213	28.42%	135	1.73%	3,226	41.43%	7,787
Boundary	1,304	60.31%	732	33.86%	126	5.83%	572	26.46%	2,162
Butte	546	62.83%	312	35.90%	11	1.27%	234	26.93%	869
Camas	442	60.47%	274	37.48%	15	2.05%	168	22.98%	731
Canyon	8,290	56.99%	4,910	33.75%	1,347	9.26%	3,380	23.24%	14,547
Caribou	640	66.53%	321	33.37%	1	0.10%	319	33.16%	962
Cassia	3,100	64.62%	1,629	33.96%	68	1.42%	1,471	30.66%	4,797
Clark	272	46.90%	304	52.41%	4	0.69%	-32	-5.52%	580
Clearwater	1,959	66.95%	812	27.75%	155	5.30%	1,147	39.20%	2,926
Custer	875	61.58%	530	37.30%	16	1.13%	345	24.28%	1,421
Elmore	1,567	65.84%	688	28.91%	125	5.25%	879	36.93%	2,380
Franklin	2,255	61.44%	1,396	38.04%	19	0.52%	859	23.41%	3,670
Fremont	2,904	66.51%	1,423	32.59%	39	0.89%	1,481	33.92%	4,366
Gem	2,468	69.17%	879	24.64%	221	6.19%	1,589	44.53%	3,568
Gooding	2,100	56.68%	1,505	40.62%	100	2.70%	595	16.06%	3,705
Idaho	3,104	62.97%	1,535	31.14%	290	5.88%	1,569	31.83%	4,929
Jefferson	2,776	71.84%	1,037	26.84%	51	1.32%	1,739	45.01%	3,864
Jerome	2,374	62.84%	1,297	34.33%	107	2.83%	1,077	28.51%	3,778
Kootenai	5,752	63.92%	2,586	28.74%	661	7.35%	3,166	35.18%	8,999
Latah	4,359	58.45%	2,838	38.05%	261	3.50%	1,521	20.39%	7,458
Lemhi	1,648	61.82%	943	35.37%	75	2.81%	705	26.44%	2,666
Lewis	1,612	74.35%	507	23.39%	49	2.26%	1,105	50.97%	2,168
Lincoln	916	53.22%	766	44.51%	39	2.27%	150	8.72%	1,721
Madison	2,455	68.35%	1,114	31.01%	23	0.64%	1,341	37.33%	3,592
Minidoka	2,095	67.65%	948	30.61%	54	1.74%	1,147	37.04%	3,097
Nez Perce	5,705	71.45%	1,988	24.90%	292	3.66%	3,717	46.55%	7,985
Oneida	1,673	63.42%	955	36.20%	10	0.38%	718	27.22%	2,638
Owyhee	1,106	64.00%	500	28.94%	122	7.06%	606	35.07%	1,728
Payette	1,677	45.78%	1,524	41.61%	462	12.61%	153	4.18%	3,663
Power	1,075	59.33%	708	39.07%	29	1.60%	367	20.25%	1,812
Shoshone	5,377	70.92%	2,146	28.30%	59	0.78%	3,231	42.61%	7,582
Teton	834	59.19%	542	38.47%	33	2.34%	292	20.72%	1,409
Twin Falls	7,476	58.28%	4,966	38.71%	386	3.01%	2,510	19.57%	12,828
Valley	1,260	63.64%	575	29.04%	145	7.32%	685	34.60%	1,980
Washington	2,147	60.38%	1,234	34.70%	175	4.92%	913	25.67%	3,556
Totals	125,683	62.96%	66,256	33.19%	7,678	3.85%	59,427	29.77%	199,617

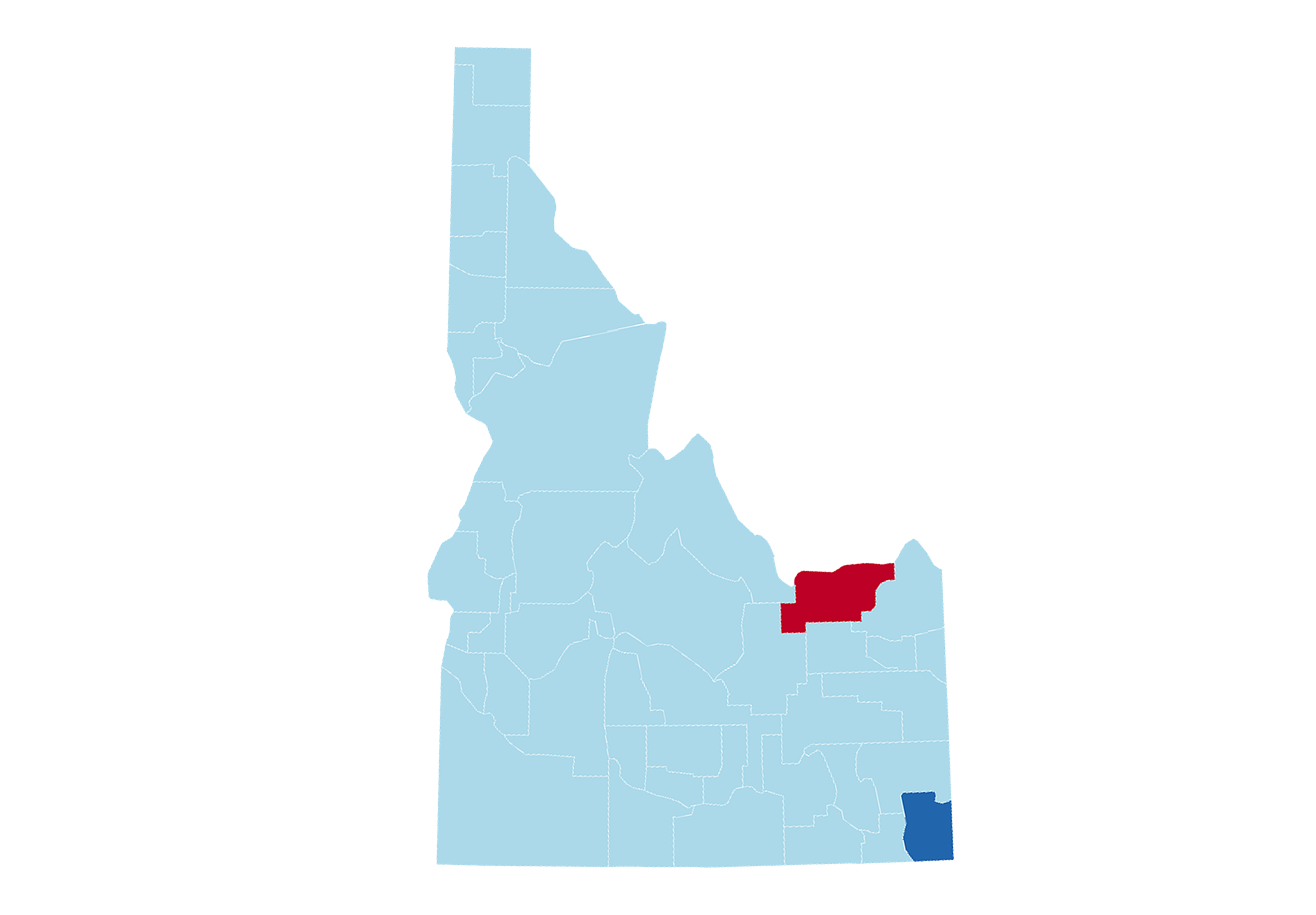
ID county flips 1932-36: Democratic Hold Gain from Republican

==== Counties that flipped from Democratic to Republican ====
- Clark

==== Counties that flipped from Republican to Democratic ====
- Bear Lake

== See also ==
- United States presidential elections in Idaho
