= G. P. Mix =

American politician and farmer (1876–1944)

Gainford P. Mix

19th and 21st Lieutenant Governor of Idaho
- In office January 7, 1935 – January 3, 1937
- Governor: C. Ben Ross
- Preceded by: George E. Hill
- Succeeded by: Charles C. Gossett
- In office January 5, 1931 – January 2, 1933
- Governor: C. Ben Ross
- Preceded by: O. E. Hailey
- Succeeded by: George E. Hill

Personal details
- Born: October 15, 1876 Grand Island, Nebraska, U.S.
- Died: June 28, 1944 (aged 67) Moscow, Idaho, U.S.
- Political party: Democratic
- Spouse: Maude Gale Mix (m. 1901)
- Children: 3
- Education: University of Idaho (BS)

Gainford P. "Gub" Mix (October 15, 1876 – June 28, 1944) was an American politician and farmer from Idaho. He served as the state's 19th and 21st lieutenant governor.

== Early life and education ==
Born in Grand Island, Nebraska, Mix came by wagon to north central Idaho as a child with his family of twelve in 1883. His parents, Franklin E. Mix and Mary Grimes Mix, settled in the Palouse region, near Moscow. A portion of the family's farm at the west end of Moscow is now the Palouse Mall.

Mix was the first student at the University of Idaho in Moscow in October 1892, starting at its prep school as a teenager. He was the first graduate of the College of Agriculture in 1901, a quarterback on the football team, and later its graduate manager.

== Career ==
Mix was elected to two two-year terms as lieutenant governor, in 1930 and 1934, both with Governor C. Ben Ross. He ran for the U.S. Senate in 1932, but was defeated in the primary by James Pope, the mayor of Boise. Mix ran for governor in 1936, but lost a close three-way race in an eight-man Democratic primary, won by Barzilla Clark.

== Personal life ==
Mix married Maude Gale in 1901 and they had five children: four sons (Gale, John, Leslie, and Gainford W.) and a daughter (Mrs. Hal Price). The eldest, Gale (1902–1971), was the athletic director at the University of Idaho from 1950 to 1954. He coached at Moscow High School in the early 1930s and was a longtime university employee. Gainford W. Mix (1911–2000) earned a degree in agriculture from the UI and ran the family farm after his father's death. He also managed the Federal Land Bank in Moscow from 1959 to 1974.

=== Death ===
Mix died in 1944 in Moscow at age 67 at Gritman Hospital, after a paralytic stroke.

Political offices
Preceded by O. E. Hailey	Lieutenant Governor of Idaho; January 5, 1931–January 2, 1933	Succeeded by George E. Hill
Preceded by George E. Hill	Lieutenant Governor of Idaho; January 7, 1935–January 3, 1937	Succeeded by Charles C. Gossett
