= Chico Marketplace =

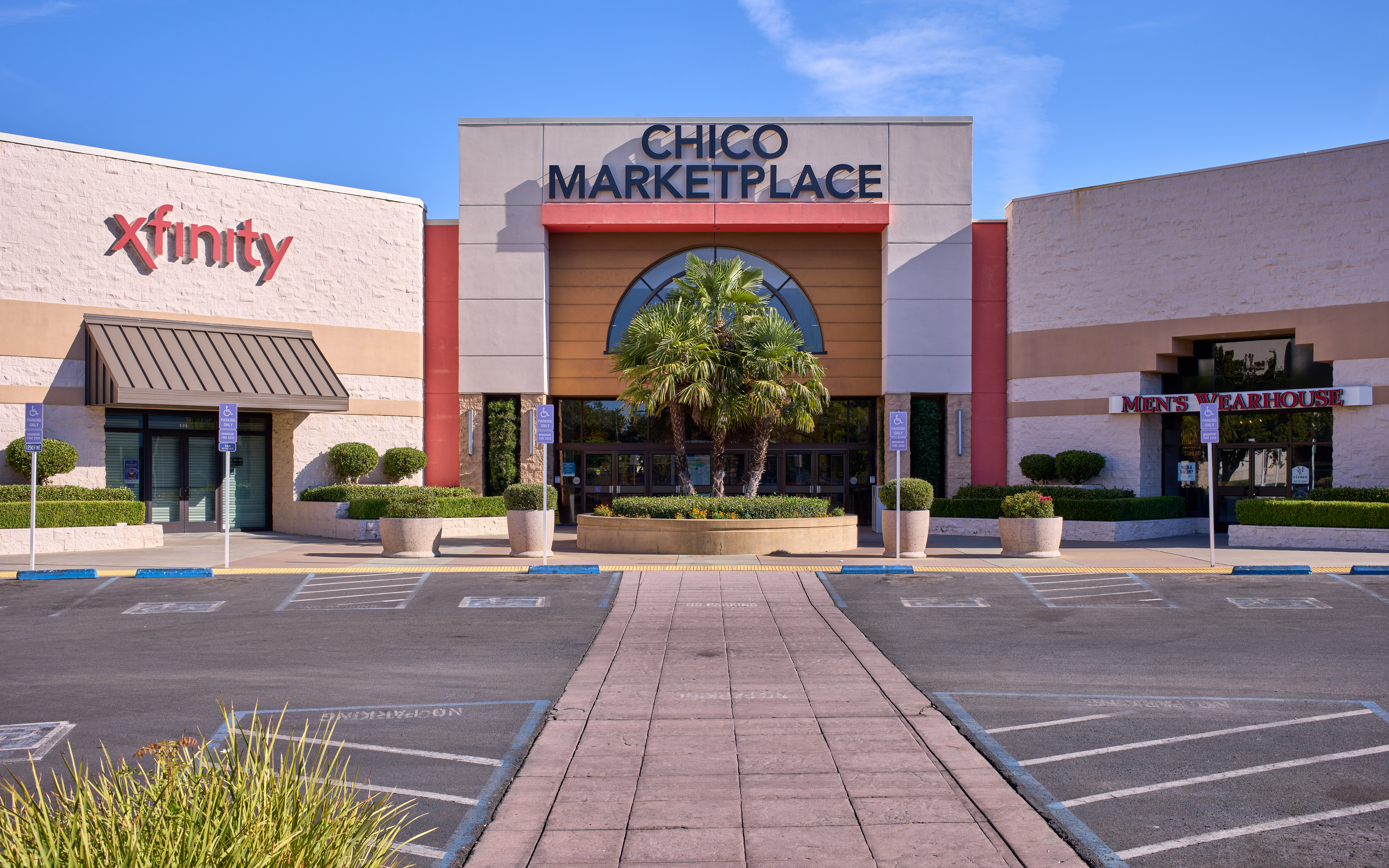
- Chico Marketplace in August 2026
- Location: Chico, California, United States
- Coordinates: 39.729425°N 121.805284°W
- Address: 1950 E. 20th Street
- Opened: 1988
- Developer: James J. Cordano
- Owner: Ethan Conrad Properties
- Num. of stores: 65+
- Num. of anchor tenants: 9 (8 open, 1 vacant)
- Floor area: 528,397 square feet (49,089.7 m^{2})
- Floors: 1 (2 in JCPenney)
- Parking: 2,607 spaces
- Website: https://www.shopchicomarketplace.com/

Chico Marketplace (formerly Chico Mall) is an enclosed shopping mall in Chico, California, United States. Opened in 1988, it features JCPenney and Dick's Sporting Goods as its anchor stores, with Burlington, HomeGoods, H&M, Petco, Boot Barn and Planet Fitness as junior anchors.

== History ==
Chico Marketplace originally opened in 1988 as Chico Mall. Its original anchor stores were Troutman's Emporium, Gottschalks, Longs Drugs, and Sears. Longs Drugs was soon converted to a JCPenney store, which moved from North Valley Plaza, a former competing shopping mall that has since converted into a conventional shopping center. As a result, Longs moved its store to nearby Paradise. Upon opening, the mall had over 95 stores and cost more than $4 million to build.

Following the bankruptcy and closing of the Troutman's store, it was converted to Dick's Sporting Goods in 2012. Prior to this addition, original mall expansion plans instead called for demolishing the former Troutman's building, then home to a local furniture store, in favor of a new lifestyle center wing.

After Gottschalks went out of business, its space became a Forever 21 store in 2009, which closed in 2020 as part of a plan to close 111 stores nationwide.

Sears, the last remaining original anchor store, announced on June 6, 2017, that it would close the Chico Mall store in September 2017 as part of a plan to close 72 stores nationwide.

On May 13, 2020, Chico Mall was renamed to its current moniker as part of its reopening from the COVID-19 lockdown that shuttered the mall in March 2020. Along with the reopening was the addition of Planet Fitness, which opened on July 28, 2020, replacing the mall's food court, and H&M, which opened on September 24, 2020.

In 2021, Burlington, Petco and HomeGoods all opened throughout the year in the anchor building that formerly housed Gottschalks and Forever 21. Western wear retailer Boot Barn filled the remaining spot in 2023.

On February 8, 2023, home furnishings retailer At Home opened in the former Sears. On June 16, 2025, it was announced that At Home would be closing as part of a plan to close 26 stores nationwide, and the store closed on August 24, 2025.
