= Oscar Hailey =

American politician

16th and 18th Lieutenant Governor of Idaho
- In office October 25, 1929 – January 5, 1931
- Governor: H. C. Baldridge
- Preceded by: H. C. Baldridge
- Succeeded by: G. P. Mix
- In office January 3, 1927 – January 7, 1929
- Preceded by: W. B. Kinne
- Succeeded by: W. B. Kinne

Member of the Idaho Senate
- In office 1919–1926

Personal details
- Born: December 10, 1870 Illinois, U.S.
- Died: July 5, 1958 (aged 87) Weiser, Idaho
- Party: Republican
- Spouse: Catherine Lena Cheiron (died 1929)

Oscar E. Hailey (December 10, 1870 – July 5, 1958) was an American politician who served as the 16th and 18th lieutenant governor of Idaho, both during the administration of Governor H. C. Baldridge.

Hailey was elected in 1926 along with Baldridge. He was succeeded as the Republican nominee in 1928 by W. B. Kinne, but returned to the position in October 1929 after Kinne died in office.

Hailey also served in the Idaho Legislature. He was a member of the Idaho Senate from 1919 to 1926. He died in 1958 at Weiser, Idaho.

Political offices
| Preceded by H. C. Baldridge | Lieutenant Governor of Idaho; January 3, 1927 – January 7, 1929 | Succeeded by W. B. Kinne |
| Preceded by W. B. Kinne | Lieutenant Governor of Idaho; October 25, 1929 – January 5, 1931 | Succeeded by G. P. Mix |
