= George Hill (Idaho politician) =

American politician (1868–1958)

George E. Hill

20th Lieutenant Governor of Idaho
- In office January 2, 1933 – January 7, 1935
- Governor: C. Ben Ross
- Preceded by: Gainford Mix
- Succeeded by: Gainford Mix

Member of the Idaho Senate
- In office 1916

Member of the Idaho House of Representatives
- In office 1911

Personal details
- Born: George Elbridge Hill; October 26, 1868 Salt Lake City, Utah, U.S.
- Died: May 6, 1958 (aged 89) Idaho Falls, Idaho, U.S.
- Party: Democratic
- Spouse: Maud Sarah Johnson
- Children: 12

George Elbridge Hill (October 26, 1868 – May 6, 1958) was an American politician who served as the 20th lieutenant governor of Idaho. Hill was elected in 1932 along with Governor C. Ben Ross.

== Career ==
In 1886, he and his father settled in Rigby, Idaho. His father built a homestead and began to cultivate the land. For four years, Hill assisted him in his agricultural enterprise. In 1890 he returned to Salt Lake City, where he entered college. He also worked as private secretary for Congressman B. H. Roberts and studied law. He also worked as newspaper reporter.

In 1902, Hill returned to Idaho. He founded the Rigby Hardware, Lumber & Manufacturing Company, which firm gave up the lumber business and later operated as one of the largest department stores in the eastern part of the state. For seventeen years Hill served in various positions in this enterprise. At the same time he joined several other business companies and led them to success. Among these companies was the Beet Growers Sugar Company. In 1919 George Hill was involved in the organization of the Jefferson County National Bank. He became the bank's first vice president and served as a director.

Politically George Hill joined the Democratic Party. He became chairman of the board of trustees of Rigby and later he was elected to the office of the mayor of this village. For twelve years he served on the board of trustees of the Rigby school district. During this time the school system in Rigby was considerably improved. In 1911 he was elected in the Idaho House of Representatives. Afterwards he held several local offices until he was elected to the Idaho Senate in 1916. Hill also held several offices in the Democratic Party of Idaho. Together with Benjamin R. Gray, he conducted the democratic state campaign in 1912 for future President Woodrow Wilson. In 1924 he was a delegate to the Democratic National Convention.

In 1930, Hill was elected lieutenant governor of Idaho. He served between January 2, 1933, and January 7, 1935.

== Personal life ==
Hill died on May 6, 1958, in Idaho Falls. He was married to Maud Johnson. The couple had twelve children.

Political offices
Preceded by G. P. Mix	Lieutenant Governor of Idaho; January 2, 1933–January 7, 1935	Succeeded by G. P. Mix
