= 1936 United States Senate election in Idaho =

- November 3, 1936
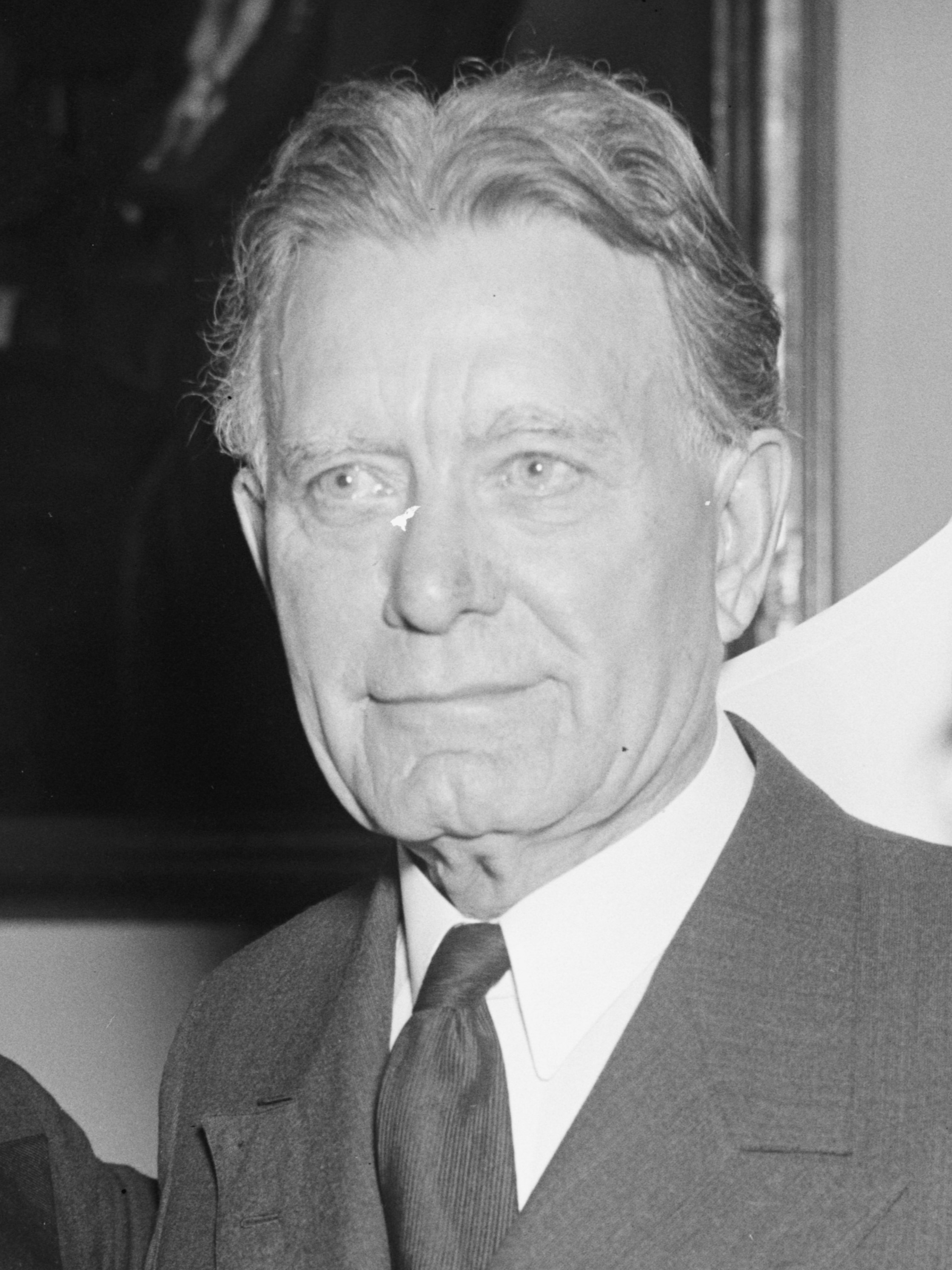

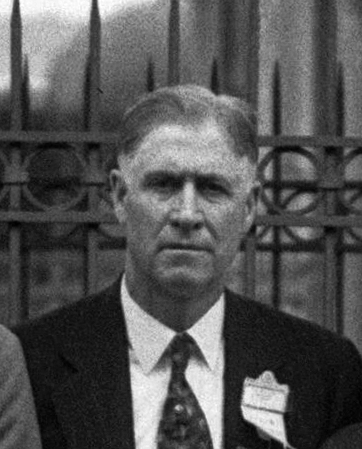
Nominee	William Borah	C. Ben Ross
Party	Republican	Democratic
Popular vote	128,723	74,444
Percentage	63.36%	36.64%
- County results Borah: 50–60% 60–70% 70–80% Ross: 50–60%
U.S. senator before election
William Borah
Republican
Elected U.S. Senator
William Borah
Republican

The 1936 United States Senate election in Idaho took place on November 3, 1936. Incumbent Republican Senator William Borah won re-election to a sixth term, defeating Governor C. Ben Ross. This would be his last term, as he died in office in January 1940.

It was originally thought that William Borah would not seek another term in the Senate, as he was running for president instead in 1936, but after losing the Republican nomination for president to Kansas governor Alf Landon, he decided to enter the Senate election for a sixth term.

== Primary elections ==
Primary elections were held on August 11, 1936.

=== Democratic primary ===
==== Candidates ====
- C. Ben Ross, Governor of Idaho (1931-1937)
- John A. Carver, attorney

==== Results ====
Democratic primary results
Party	Candidate	Votes	%
Democratic	C. Ben Ross	29,471	56.39
Democratic	John A. Carver	22,788	43.61
Total votes		52,259	

=== Republican primary ===
==== Candidates ====
- William Borah, incumbent U.S. Senator
- Byron Defenbach, former Idaho State Treasurer (1927-1931) and candidate for governor in 1932

==== Results ====
Republican primary results
Party	Candidate	Votes	%
Republican	William Borah (incumbent)	32,499	77.49
Republican	Byron Defenbach	9,442	22.51
Total votes		41,941	

== General election ==
=== Results ===
1936 United States Senate election in Idaho
Party	Candidate	Votes	%
Republican	William Borah (incumbent)	128,723	63.36
Democratic	C. Ben Ross	74,444	36.64
Majority		54,279	26.72
Turnout		203,167	
Republican hold			

== See also ==
- 1936 United States Senate elections
