= W. B. Kinne =

American politician

17th Lieutenant Governor of Idaho
- In office January 7, 1929 – September 30, 1929
- Governor: H. C. Baldridge
- Preceded by: O. E. Hailey
- Succeeded by: O. E. Hailey

Personal details
- Born: William Baker Kinne; March 22, 1874 Point Wolf, New Brunswick, Canada
- Died: October 1, 1929 (aged 55) Orofino, Idaho
- Party: Republican
- Spouse: Isabelle M. Kinne

William Baker Kinne (March 22, 1874 – October 1, 1929) was a Republican politician from Idaho. He served as the 17th Lieutenant Governor of Idaho for eight months in 1929 during the administration of Governor H. C. Baldridge. He was a native of New Brunswick. He was kidnapped in June 1929 along with another occupant, however he managed to escape and inform the public about the incident, creating a manhunt for the suspects involved, who were eventually arrested, tried and imprisoned. Kinne died in office in October 1929 at Orofino, Idaho of peritonitis resulting from appendicitis and was succeeded by O. E. Hailey.

== See also ==
- List of kidnappings (1900–1929)

Political offices
| Preceded by O. E. Hailey | Lieutenant Governor of Idaho; January 7, 1929–September 30, 1929 | Succeeded by O. E. Hailey |
