= 1934 Idaho gubernatorial election =

- November 6, 1934
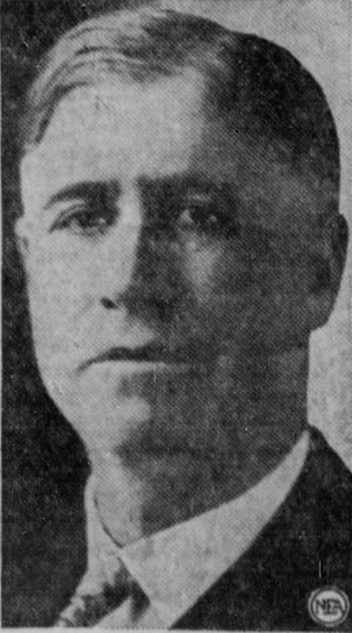

Nominee	C. Ben Ross	Frank L. Stephan
Party	Democratic	Republican
Popular vote	93,313	75,659
Percentage	54.58%	44.26%
- County results Ross: 40–50% 50–60% 60–70% Stephan: 50–60%
Governor before election
C. Ben Ross
Democratic
Elected Governor
C. Ben Ross
Democratic

The 1934 Idaho gubernatorial election was held on November 6. Incumbent Democrat C. Ben Ross defeated Republican nominee Frank Stephan with 54.58% of the vote.

This was the last re-election of an incumbent Idaho governor for 24 years, until 1958.

Ross opted not to run for a fourth term in 1936; he ran for the U.S. Senate against its dean, Republican William Borah, who won a sixth term.

== Primary elections ==
Primary elections were held on August 14, 1934.

=== Democratic primary ===
==== Candidates ====
- C. Ben Ross, incumbent governor
- Frank Martin, Boise, former attorney general
- Asher Wilson, Twin Falls

=== Republican primary ===
==== Candidates ====
- Frank Stephan, Twin Falls
- J. Wesley Holden, Idaho Falls attorney
- H. F. Fait

== General election ==
=== Candidates ===
Major party candidates

- C. Ben Ross, Democratic
- Frank Stephan, Republican

Other candidates

- Allen F. Adams, Socialist
- T. H. Darrow, Independent

=== Results ===
1934 Idaho gubernatorial election
Party	Candidate	Votes	%	±%
Democratic	C. Ben Ross (incumbent)	93,313	54.58%	
Republican	Frank Stephan	75,659	44.26%	
Socialist	Allen F. Adams	1,169	0.68%	
Independent	T. H. Darrow	813	0.48%	
Majority		17,654		
Turnout				
Democratic hold		Swing		
