= 1926 Idaho gubernatorial election =

- November 2, 1926
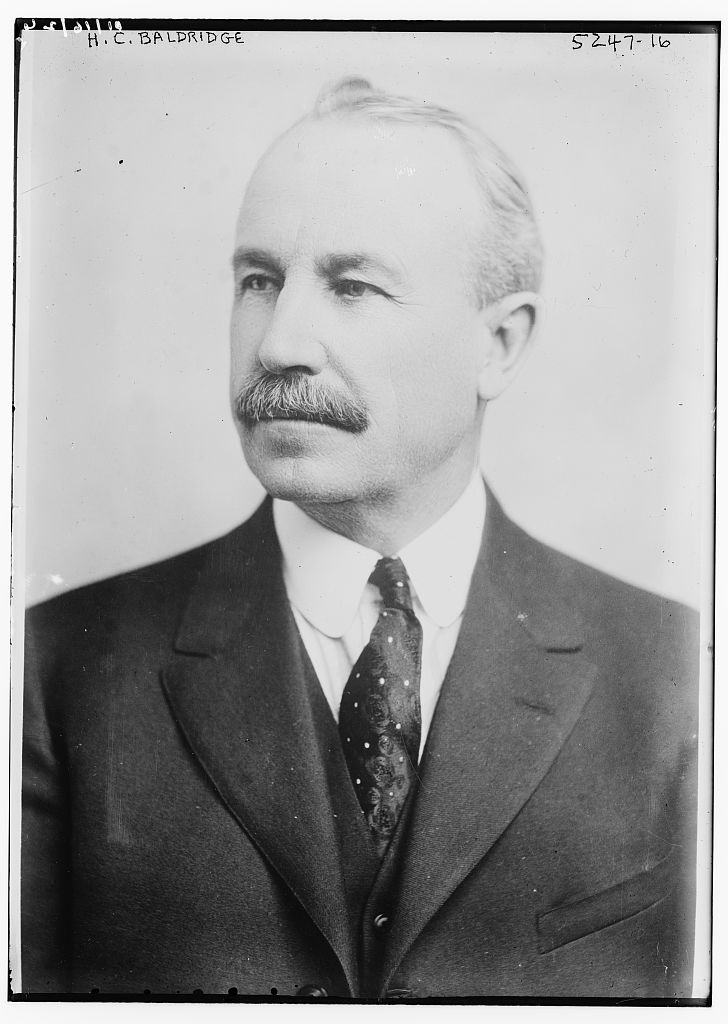

| Nominee | H. C. Baldridge | W. Scott Hall | Asher B. Wilson |
| Party | Republican | Progressive | Democratic |
| Popular vote | 61,575 | 34,208 | 24,837 |
| Percentage | 51.05% | 28.36% | 20.59% |
- Results by county Baldridge: 30–40% 40–50% 50–60% 60–70% 70–80% Hall: 40–50% 60–70%
Governor before election
Charles C. Moore
Republican
Elected Governor
H. C. Baldridge
Republican

The 1926 Idaho gubernatorial election was held on November 2, 1926. Republican nominee H. C. Baldridge defeated Progressive nominee W. Scott Hall with 51.05% of the vote.

== General election ==
=== Candidates ===
Major party candidates

- H. C. Baldridge, Republican
- Asher B. Wilson, Democratic

Other candidates

- W. Scott Hall, Progressive

=== Results ===
1926 Idaho gubernatorial election
| Party | Candidate | Votes | % | ±% |
|---|---|---|---|---|
| Republican | H. C. Baldridge | 61,575 | 51.05% | |
| Progressive | W. Scott Hall | 34,208 | 28.36% | |
| Democratic | Asher B. Wilson | 24,837 | 20.59% | |
| Majority | | 27,367 | | |
| Turnout | | | | |
| Republican hold | | Swing | | |
