= 1936 Idaho gubernatorial election =

- November 3, 1936
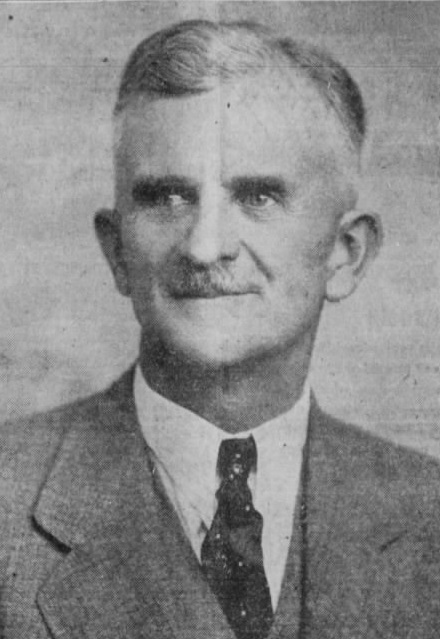

Nominee	Barzilla Clark	Frank Stephan
Party	Democratic	Republican
Popular vote	115,098	83,430
Percentage	57.19%	41.46%
- County results Clark: 40–50% 50–60% 60–70% 70–80% Stephan: 40–50% 50–60%
Governor before election
C. Ben Ross
Democratic
Elected Governor
Barzilla Clark
Democratic

The 1936 Idaho gubernatorial election was held on November 3. Vying for an open seat, Democratic nominee Barzilla Clark defeated Republican nominee Frank Stephan with 57.19% of the vote.

Three-term incumbent governor C. Ben Ross opted to run for the U.S. Senate against its dean, Republican William Borah, who won a sixth term.

== Primary elections ==
Primary elections were held on August 11, 1936.

=== Democratic primary ===
==== Candidates ====
- Barzilla Clark, Idaho Falls mayor
- G. P. Mix, Moscow, lieutenant governor
- Bert Miller, St. Anthony, attorney general
- W.P. Whitaker, Pocatello
- Franklin Girard, Coeur d'Alene, secretary of state
- George Meffan, Nampa, U.S. Marshal
- Asher Wilson, Twin Falls
- Frank Martin, Boise

=== Republican primary ===
==== Candidates ====
- Frank Stephan, Twin Falls
- L. V. Patch, Payette
- T. B. Chapman, Boise

== General election ==
=== Candidates ===
Major party candidates

- Barzilla Clark, Democratic
- Frank Stephan, Republican

Other candidates

- V. A. Verhei, Union

=== Results ===
1936 Idaho gubernatorial election
Party	Candidate	Votes	%	±%
Democratic	Barzilla Clark	115,098	57.19%	
Republican	Frank Stephan	83,430	41.46%	
Union	V. A. Verhei	2,716	1.35%	
Majority				
Turnout				
Democratic hold		Swing		
