= Nampa Gateway Center =

- Location: Nampa, Idaho, United States
- Coordinates: 43°35′44″N 116°30′35″W
- Opened: August 3, 2007
- Manager: Gardner Company
- Owner: Gardner Company
- Num. of anchor tenants: 6
- Floor area: 850,000 sq ft (79,000 m^{2})
- Floors: 1
- Parking: 2,000,000 sq ft (190,000 m^{2})

Nampa Gateway Center is a lifestyle center located in Nampa, Idaho, United States. The center is owned by Gardner Company and is anchored by Crunch Fitness, DEFY Trampoline Parks, House of Design Robotics, JCPenney, Shoe Carnival, and WinCo Foods.

== History ==
The shopping center opened August 3, 2007 with a JCPenney department store, marking the return of the retail chain to Nampa after a 19-year absence. The center was one of the keystones in the overall revitalization of Nampa's downtown in 2005.

In January 2008, Sports Authority announced it would close its old Nampa location near Karcher Mall and construct a new 35,000 sq ft (3,300 m^{2}) store in the shopping center. In August 2008, Macy's announced it too would close its Karcher Mall store in late 2009 to move to the shopping center. Sports Authority opened in September 2009 and Macy's opening in October 2009. A branch of the Idaho Athletic Club opened at the Nampa Gateway Center in 2009. Nampa's second Edwards Cinemas opened in the center in November 2010.

Sports Authority closed its store in January 2016. In July 2016, plans were approved for construction of a WinCo Foods, which opened in early 2017. In January 2017, Macy's announced it will close later in 2017. The store closed in April 2017.

The shopping center was sold by SITE Centers to RCG Ventures in late 2017. It was sold again to Gardner Company in 2021. In 2022, plans were announced to convert the Macy's building into the headquarters and technology center for House of Design Robotics. In October 2022, Edwards Theaters was permanently closed.

In February 2023, Gardner Company revealed plans to redevelop portions of the shopping center. Plans call for the demolition and repurpose of the center's vacant retail space and the construction of 77 town houses and 168 apartments.
