= List of mayors of Idaho Falls =

The following is a list of mayors of the city of Idaho Falls, Idaho, United States.

- Joseph Addison Clark, 1899–1902
- Curley Bowen, 1902–1903, 1911–1913
- Alvin T. Shane, 1903–1904
- Edward P. Coltman, 1904–1907, 1909–1910
- D. G. Platt, 1907–1909
- Louis Elg, 1910–1913
- Barzilla W. Clark, 1913–1915, 1927–1936
- George W. Edgington, 1915–1917
- Ralph A. Louis, 1917–1919, 1921–1927
- W. A. Bradbury, 1919–1921
- R. B. Ewart, 1936–1937
- Chase A. Clark, 1937–1940
- E. W. Fanning, 1940–1949, 1951–1956
- Thomas L. Sutton, 1949–1951
- John B. Rogers, 1956–1959
- W. J. O’Bryant, 1959–1963
- S. Eddie Peterson, 1964–1978
- Thomas V. Campbell, 1978–1993
- Linda M. Milam, 1993–2005
- Jared D. Fuhriman, 2006–2013
- Rebecca Casper, 2014–2026
- Lisa Burtenshaw, 2026–

== See also ==
- Idaho Falls history
