= Sprouse-Reitz =

Defunct American variety store chain

Sprouse-Reitz (Sprouse!)
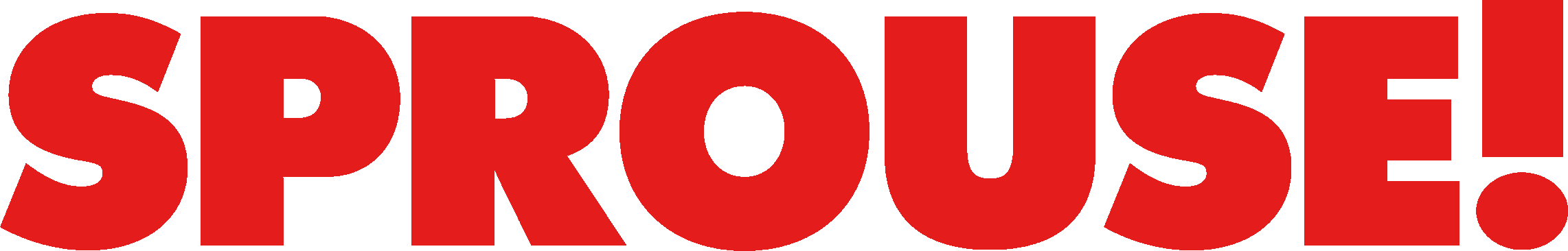
- Type: Public (NASDAQ: STRS)
- Industry: Retail
- Founded: Portland, Oregon, United States (1909)
- Defunct: 1994
- Fate: Liquidation
- Headquarters: Portland, Oregon
- Number of locations: Approx. 320 stores (max.)
- Area served: Western United States
- Products: General Merchandise
- Total assets: $80 million (1991)

Sprouse-Reitz is a defunct chain of five-and-dime stores based in Portland, Oregon, United States. The Sprouse-Reitz Company was founded in 1909 in Tacoma, Washington. At its peak it had more than 470 stores in eleven states in the Western United States.

Around January 1989, the declining retailer tried to revive its business by rebranding its stores "Sprouse!". In June 1990, with the store count at 287, CEO Robert Sprouse II, who controlled about 80 percent of the company's voting stock, said that chain would change its focus to six specific areas: toys, housewares, crafts, home furnishings, family apparel, greeting cards, wrapping paper, and other paper products. In late 1990, the chain was sold for $22.9 million (~$48.4 million in 2024) to SR Partners, Inc., a joint venture among realtors TransAction Financial Corp., acquisition specialists First San Francisco Holdings, Ltd., and individual investors.

In December 1993, Sprouse-Reitz Inc. liquidated and closed its remaining 84 stores after failing to find a buyer. The company estimated that the last stores would close in February. As of late February 1994, the last stores were scheduled to close on March 20.

== Gallery ==
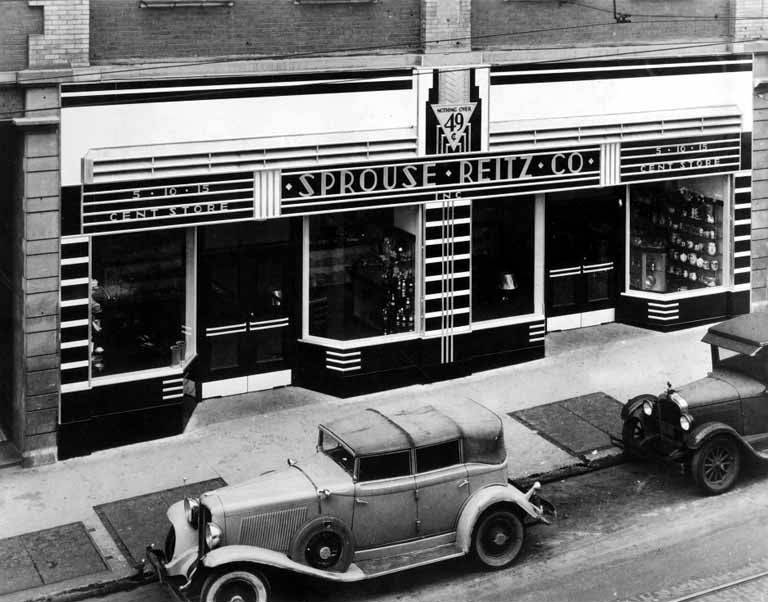
The Sprouse-Reits store in Portland, Oregon around 1925

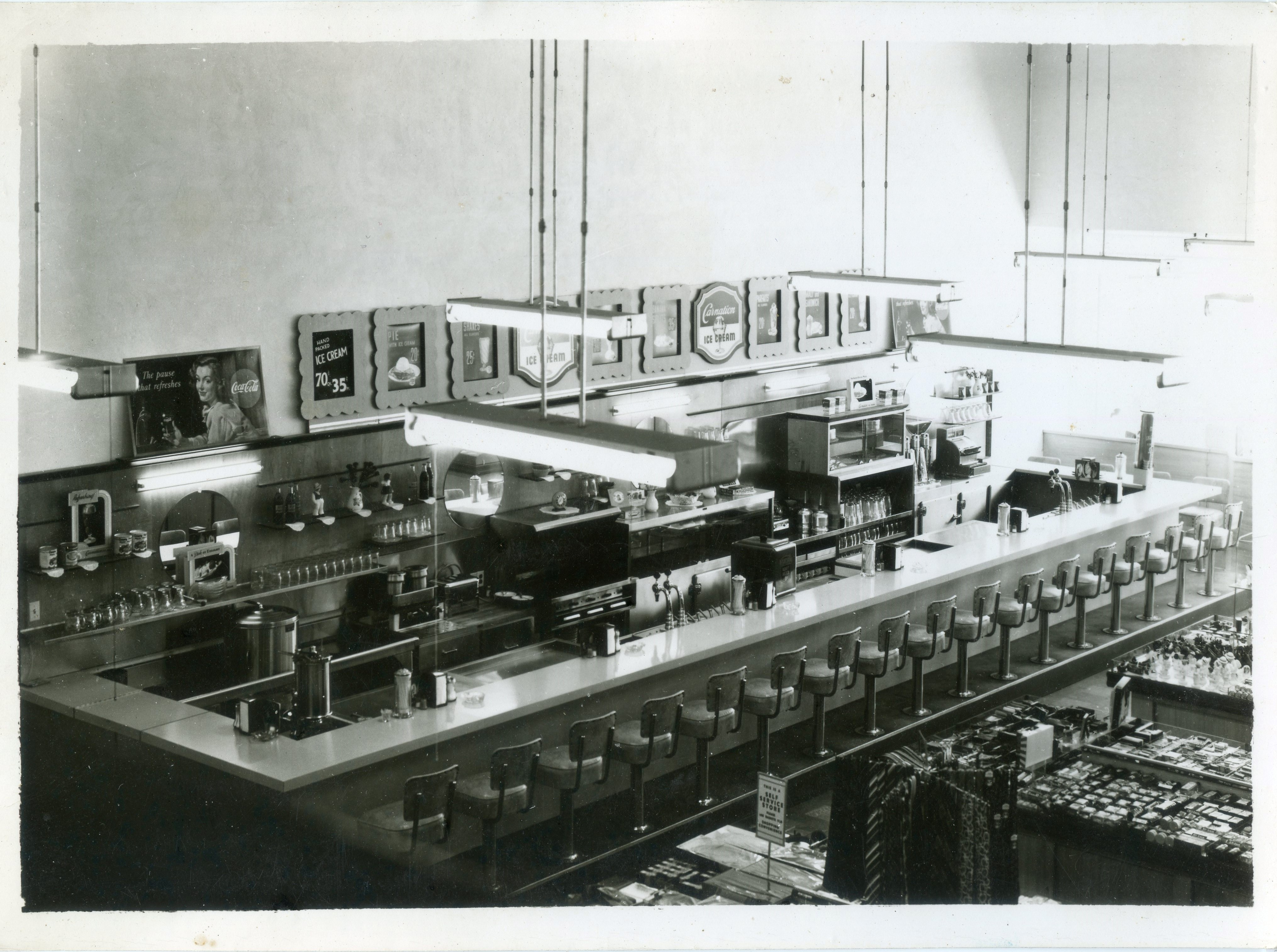
The lunch counter at an unidentified store in 1947-48

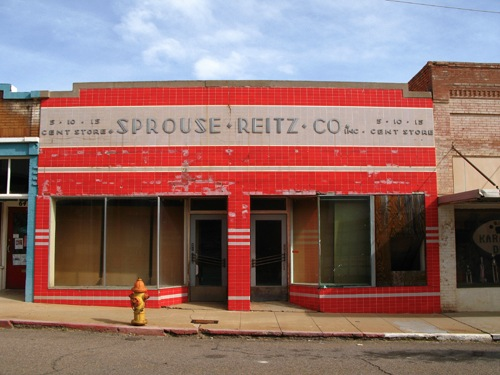
An early store still lettered for the company (as of 2008) long after its closure, in Bisbee, Arizona

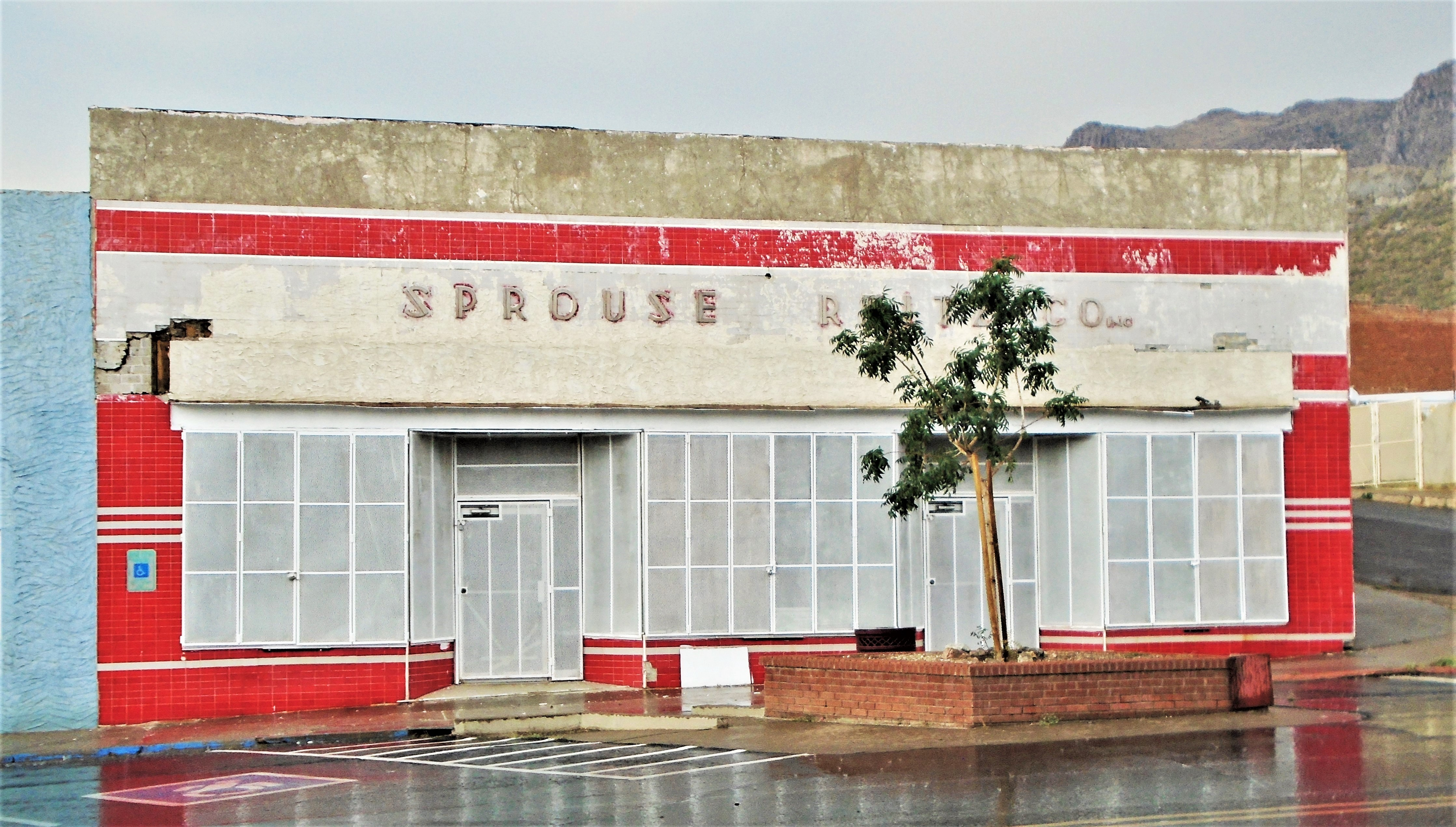
A former store in Superior, Arizona (2021)
