= 1928 Idaho gubernatorial election =

- November 6, 1928
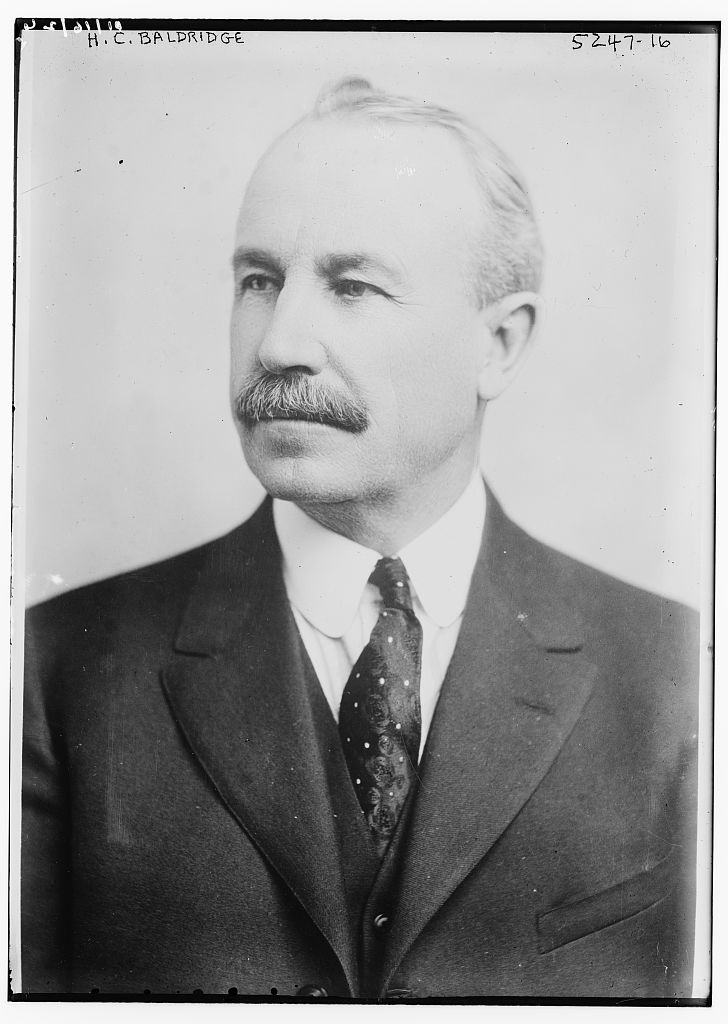

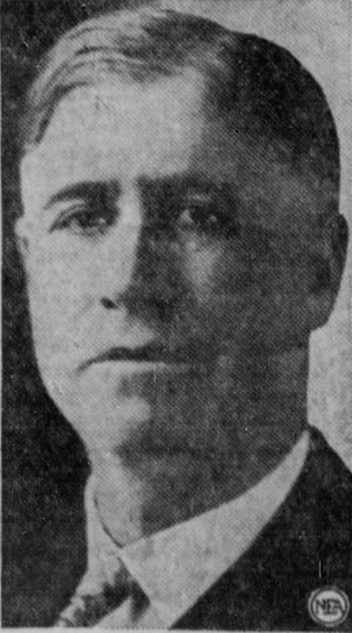
Nominee	H. C. Baldridge	C. Ben Ross
Party	Republican	Democratic
Popular vote	87,681	63,046
Percentage	57.82%	41.58%
- Results by county Baldridge: 50–60% 60–70% 70–80% Ross: 40–50% 50–60% 60–70%
Governor before election
H. C. Baldridge
Republican
Elected Governor
H. C. Baldridge
Republican

The 1928 Idaho gubernatorial election was held on November 6, 1928. Incumbent Republican H. C. Baldridge defeated Democratic nominee C. Ben Ross with 57.82% of the vote.

== General election ==
=== Candidates ===
Major party candidates

- H. C. Baldridge, Republican
- C. Ben Ross, Democratic

Other candidates

- Thomas J. Coonrod, Socialist

=== Results ===
1928 Idaho gubernatorial election
Party	Candidate	Votes	%	±%
Republican	H. C. Baldridge (incumbent)	87,681	57.82%	
Democratic	C. Ben Ross	63,046	41.58%	
Socialist	Thomas J. Coonrod	908	0.60%	
Majority		24,635		
Turnout				
Republican hold		Swing		
