= Barzilla W. Clark =

American politician (1880–1943)

Barzilla Clark
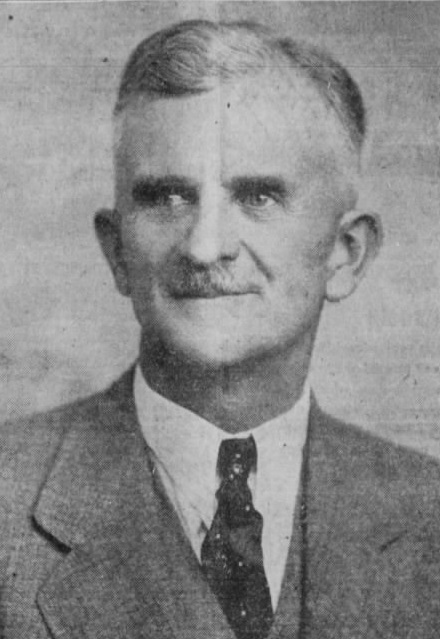
- Idaho Falls Post-Register, 1943.

16th Governor of Idaho
- In office January 4, 1937 – January 2, 1939
- Lieutenant: Charles C. Gossett
- Preceded by: C. Ben Ross
- Succeeded by: C. A. Bottolfsen

Mayor of Idaho Falls
- In office 1926–1936
- In office 1913–1915

Personal details
- Born: Barzilla Worth Clark; December 22, 1880 Hendricks County, Indiana, US
- Died: September 21, 1943 (aged 62) Idaho Falls, Idaho, US
- Resting place: Rose Hill Cemetery, Idaho Falls, Idaho, US
- Party: Democratic
- Spouse(s): Ethel Salome Peck Clark (m. 1905)
- Children: 4
- Profession: Civil engineer

Barzilla Worth Clark (December 22, 1880 – September 21, 1943) was an American politician from Idaho. He served as the 16th governor of Idaho (1937–1939), mayor of Idaho Falls, and was a member of the Idaho Democratic Party.

== Early life and education ==
Clark was born in Hadley, Indiana, the son of Eunice (Hadley) and Joseph Addison Clark. Clark made the journey to eastern Idaho by narrow-gauge railroad in 1885 with his family to Eagle Rock (now Idaho Falls). He attended Rose Polytechnic Institute in Terre Haute, Indiana, but left school due to a lung injury during track and field practice.

== Career ==
After leaving school, Clark returned to Idaho and engaged in farming, mining, and cattle raising. On October 26, 1905, he married Ethel Salome Peck, and they had four children.

Clark became a licensed engineer in 1905 and worked as a civil engineer. His reservoir on the Blackfoot River was purchased by the government and his plan for impounding Lost River was merged into Mackay Dam. After two terms as councilman, he served as mayor of Idaho Falls from 1913 to 1915 and again from 1926 to 1936. During this term, the city built the Municipal Hydroelectric Plant No. 1.

Clark's interest turned to Idaho mines until he was again elected mayor of Idaho Falls in 1927 and served until his inauguration as governor on January 4, 1937. During his two-year term, a state tuberculosis hospital was authorized, a judicious pardon and parole system was installed, and junior college districts were created.

Clark lost the Democratic primary for a second term to his predecessor, C. Ben Ross, who ran for United States Senate in 1936 against longtime incumbent William Borah. Ross lost the general election in 1938 to C. A. Bottolfsen; Clark left office on January 2, 1939, and returned to Idaho Falls and his private interests. He chose not to run in 1940 to reclaim the office, which was won by his younger brother Chase Clark (1883–1966). Chase was the father-in-law of Frank Church (1924–84), a four-term U.S. Senator (1957–81) and presidential candidate in 1976. In turn, Bottolfsen defeated Chase in 1942.

== Death ==
Clark died of complications of lung cancer at age 62 in Idaho Falls in 1943; he is interred at Rose Hill Cemetery in Idaho Falls.

== See also ==
- List of mayors of Idaho Falls

Party political offices
Preceded by C. Ben Ross	Democratic Party nominee, Governor of Idaho; 1936 (won)	Succeeded by C. Ben Ross
Political offices
Preceded by C. Ben Ross	Governor of Idaho; January 4, 1937 – January 2, 1939	Succeeded by C. A. Bottolfsen
