= H. C. Baldridge =

American politician

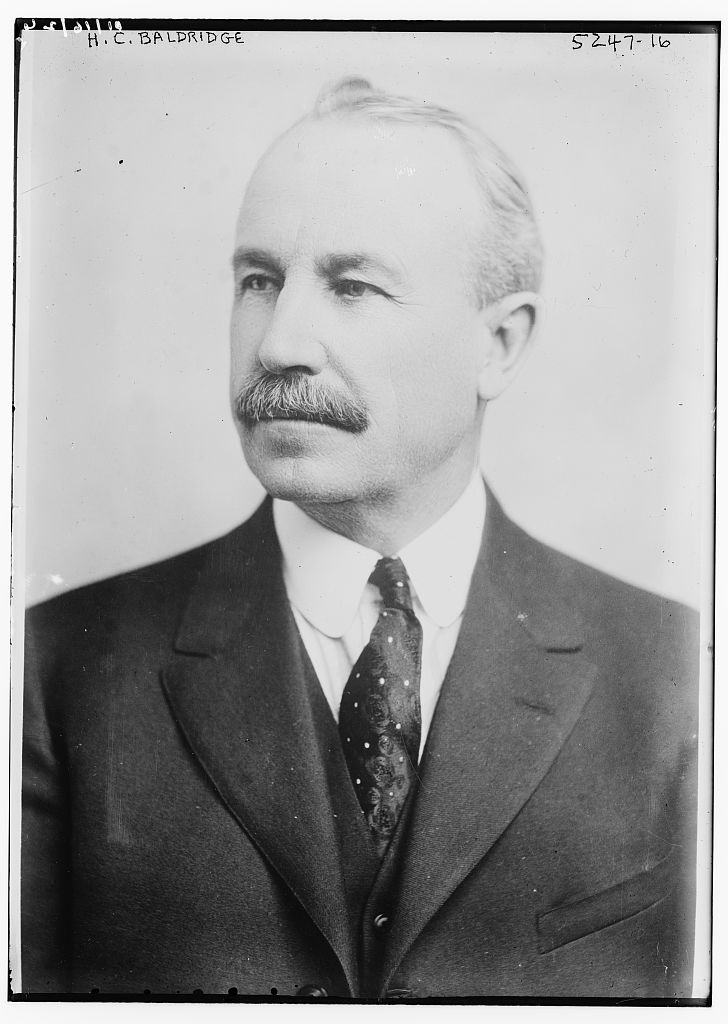

14th Governor of Idaho
- In office January 3, 1927 – January 5, 1931
- Lieutenant: O. E. Hailey; W. B. Kinne; O. E. Hailey
- Preceded by: Charles C. Moore
- Succeeded by: C. Ben Ross

15th Lieutenant Governor of Idaho
- In office January 1, 1923 – January 3, 1927
- Governor: Charles C. Moore
- Preceded by: Charles C. Moore
- Succeeded by: O. E. Hailey

Member of the Idaho House of Representatives
- In office 1911–1913

Member of the Idaho Senate
- In office 1913

Personal details
- Born: Henry Clarence Baldridge; November 24, 1868 Carlock, Illinois, US
- Died: June 8, 1947 (aged 78) Boise, Idaho, US
- Resting place: Parma Cemetery, Parma, Idaho, US
- Party: Republican
- Spouse(s): Cora A. McCreighton Baldridge (1872–1941) (m. 1893–1941, her death)
- Children: 1 son, 1 daughter
- Education: Illinois Wesleyan University
- Profession: Education, Mercantile, Agribusiness, Banking

H. Clarence Baldridge (November 24, 1868 – June 8, 1947) was an American politician. A Republican, he was the 14th governor of Idaho, serving from 1927 until 1931.

== Biography ==
Born in Carlock, Illinois, Baldridge was educated in public schools. He attended Illinois Wesleyan University and then taught school. He married Cora A. McCreighton on February 1, 1893. They had a son, M. Claire Baldridge, and a daughter, L. Gail Baldridge.

== Career ==
Baldridge relocated from Illinois to Southwestern Idaho in 1904 and settled in Parma, working in the mercantile trade. Later he dealt in implements and hardware and was president of the local bank. Baldridge entered the Idaho Legislature in 1911 as a member of the Idaho House of Representatives. In 1913, he was elected to the Idaho Senate, where he served a single term. In 1922 he was elected the 15th lieutenant governor of Idaho. He was re-elected in 1924 and served in that capacity in the administration of Governor Charles C. Moore. Baldridge was elected governor in 1926 and re-elected in 1928. Although he warned against the expansion of public building programs, significant additions were made to the University of Idaho in Moscow, Idaho. State highway building was financed by a state gasoline tax.

After leaving office on January 5, 1931, Baldridge returned to his various business interests. He ran for Congress in Idaho's 1st congressional district in 1942, but was defeated in the general election by five-term incumbent Compton I. White of Clark Fork. Baldridge was appointed Commissioner of Charitable Returns and served from 1943 to 1945.

== Death ==
After the death of his wife, Baldridge moved from Parma to Boise in 1942. He died in Boise on June 8, 1947, and is interred at Parma Cemetery in Parma.

Party political offices
Preceded by Charles C. Moore	Republican nominee for Governor of Idaho; 1926, 1928	Succeeded by John McMurray
Political offices
Preceded by Charles C. Moore	Lieutenant Governor of Idaho; January 1, 1923 – January 3, 1927	Succeeded by O. E. Hailey
Preceded by Charles C. Moore	Governor of Idaho; January 3, 1927 – January 5, 1931	Succeeded by C. Ben Ross
