= Emporium (Oregon-based department store) =

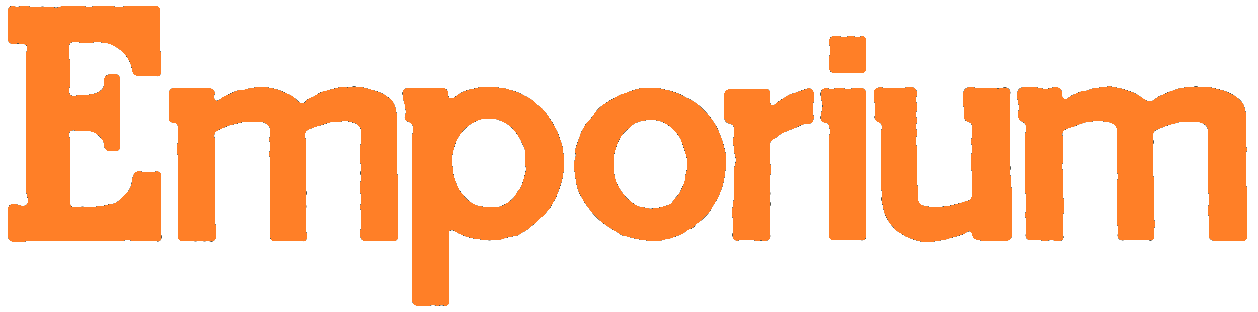
- Company type: Department store
- Industry: Retail
- Founded: 1955 (North Bend, Oregon)
- Defunct: 2003
- Headquarters: Eugene, Oregon
- Products: Clothing, footwear, bedding, furniture, jewelry, beauty products, and housewares.

Emporium, more formally known as Troutman's Emporium, was a chain of department stores founded in 1955 by Dallas Troutman in North Bend, Oregon. After 1977, Emporium's headquarters was located in Eugene, Oregon. At its peak, Emporium operated at least 34 stores, in Oregon, Idaho, Nevada, California and Washington. The company filed for Chapter 11 bankruptcy protection in 2002 and liquidated. The last stores closed in 2003.

== History ==
=== Beginnings ===
Emporium was founded in 1955, when Dallas Troutman opened the first Emporium store, in North Bend, Oregon, a 4,000-square-foot (370 m^{2}) store in a building previously used as a grocery store. In 1963, Troutman's Emporium moved to a 14,000-square-foot (1,300 m^{2}) space in Pony Village Shopping Center, an enclosed shopping mall. Troutman's Emporium started growing when the company opened a second store at the Willamette Plaza in Eugene, Oregon, in 1968. A third store was built in 1972 in Mount Vernon, Washington.

=== Expansion ===
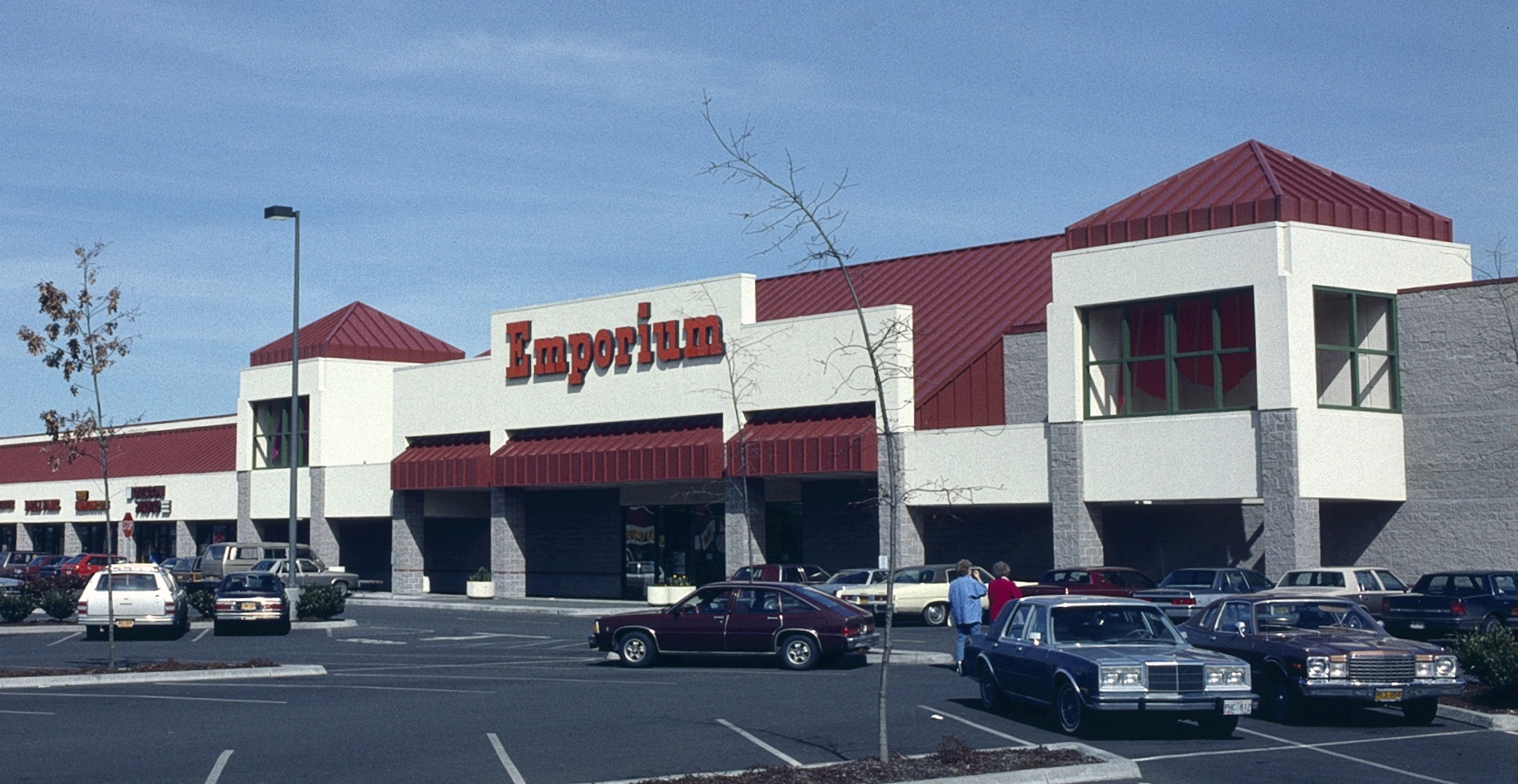
An Emporium store in Gresham, Oregon, in 1989

In 1973, Troutman's Emporium acquired two Alexander's stores in Springfield and Florence, Oregon. Years earlier, Dallas Troutman had worked at the Springfield Alexander's store while in high school, working stock and sweeping floors. The company's headquarters was moved to the Springfield store after its acquisition, but when it was damaged by fire in 1977, the headquarters was relocated to Eugene, where Emporium also opened a new distribution center.

The next several years were a period of major expansion, and by 1983, Emporium was a 13-store chain. The company's gross sales in 1984 exceeded $50 million, and as of 1985 the company had about 1,000 employees. Founder Dallas Troutman was still company president. Around 325,000 customers held Emporium charge accounts at that time. By this time, at least, the stores were all identified simply as Emporium, and the company name was alternatively given as Emporium Inc. or Troutman's Emporium. The average store size was 30,000–40,000 square feet (2,800–3,700 m^{2}) at that time, following early 1980s remodeling of some stores.

In 1986, Emporium acquired the then-40-year-old, eight-store Quisenberry's chain, which had five stores in Eastern Oregon and three in Idaho. Over the next two years Troutman's Emporium opened 5 stores, including a store in Chico, California. In 1988, Emporium acquired a J.C. Penney store in Nampa, Idaho, at the Karcher Mall. The Chico store opened at Chico Mall in 1988, and was the only Emporium in California. That store was called "Troutman's", due to a trademark dispute with Emporium in California (Emporium-Capwell at the time of the Troutman's store's opening). In 1999, Emporium was in merger talks with Lamonts, but it fell through. In 2000, Ron Schiff was hired as the new president and CEO of Troutman's Emporium. Ron Schiff added six new stores in fall 2000 including stores in Aberdeen, Washington; Brookings, The Dalles and Cottage Grove, in Oregon; and Elko and Winnemucca, in Nevada.

=== Bankruptcy and liquidation ===
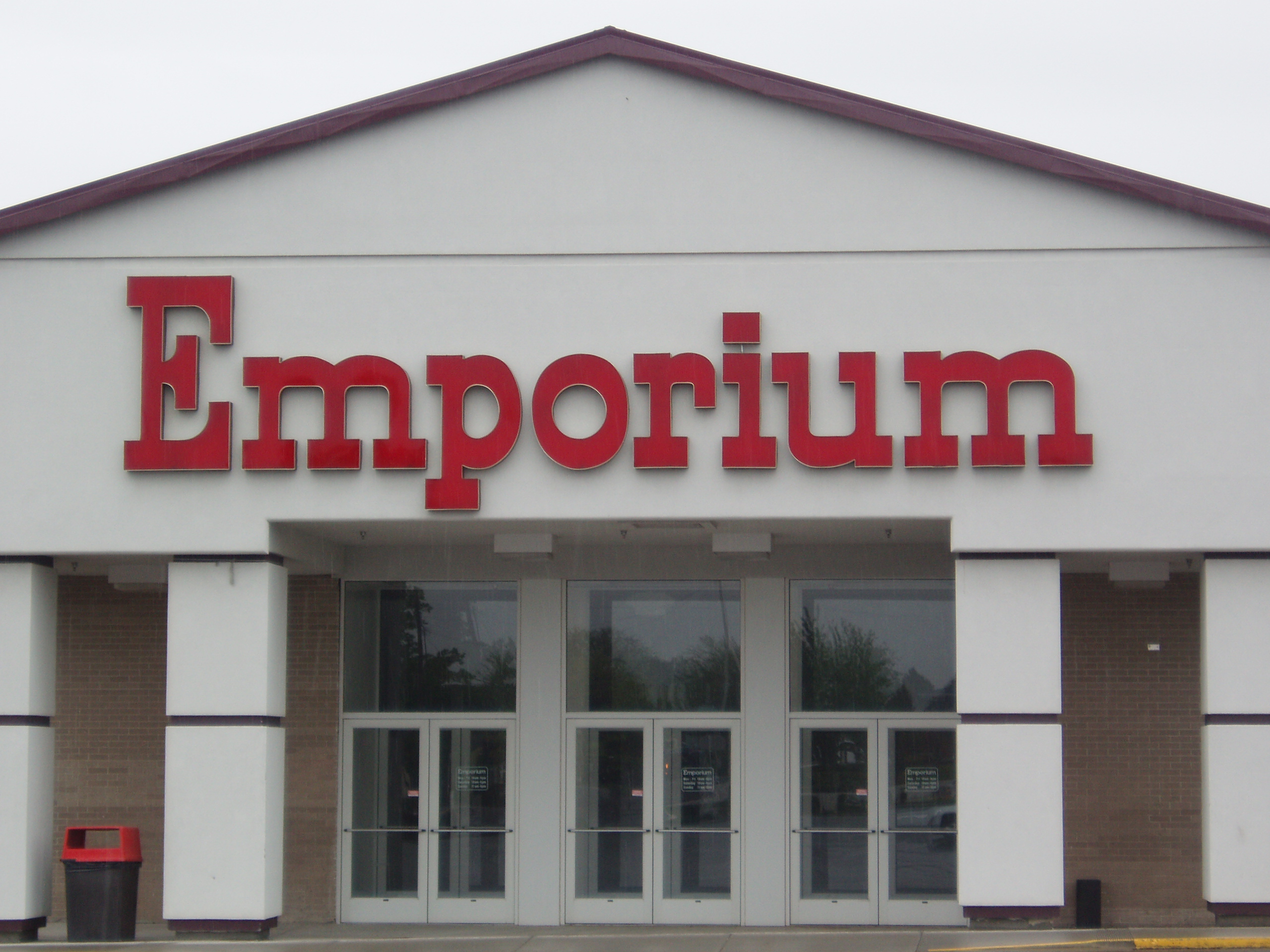
A former Emporium in Ontario, Oregon, in 2006

In 2002, faced with increasing debt with creditors, Troutman's Emporium filed for Chapter 11 bankruptcy. The company initially planned on closing one store but instead found themselves with far more debt than expected. Unable to secure financing or investment partners while in bankruptcy, Emporium announced it would be closing all of its stores and was formally going out of business. The last stores were closed in 2003. The company's remaining assets were liquidated, and it completed the remainder of its bankruptcy proceedings in 2004. When the closure was announced, the company had been operating 34 stores across five western U.S. states employing 1,600 people.
