= C. Ben Ross =

American politician

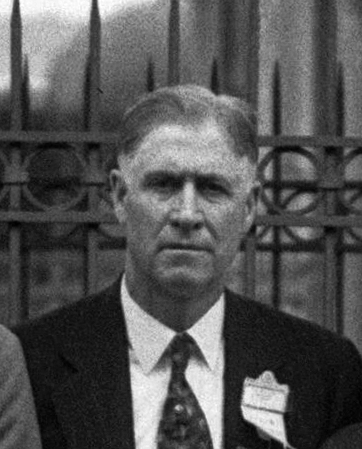

15th Governor of Idaho
- In office January 5, 1931 – January 4, 1937
- Lieutenant: G. P. Mix; George Hill; G. P. Mix
- Preceded by: H. C. Baldridge
- Succeeded by: Barzilla Clark

Mayor of Pocatello
- In office 1922–1930
- Preceded by: Arthur P. Bean
- Succeeded by: Ivan Gasser

Canyon County Commissioner
- In office 1915–1921

Personal details
- Born: Charles Benjamin Ross; December 27, 1876 Parma, Idaho Territory
- Died: March 31, 1946 (aged 69) Boise, Idaho, US
- Resting place: Parma Cemetery; Parma, Idaho
- Party: Democratic
- Spouse: Edna May Reavis
- Profession: Rancher

Charles Benjamin Ross (December 27, 1876 – March 31, 1946) was an American politician who served as the first Idaho-born governor from 1931 to 1937.

== Early life and education ==
One of eight children, Ross was born in the Idaho Territory in 1876 near Parma to cattleman John M. Ross and his wife Jeanette. He left school after sixth grade, but at age eighteen, he decided to continue his education and graduated from Portland Commercial College. In 1897, he returned to the family ranch and co-managed it with his brother, W. H. Ross.

== Career ==
Ross began his political career in Canyon County, serving as county commissioner from 1915 to 1921. He moved east to Bannock County and served as mayor of Pocatello from 1922 to 1930, and won the Democratic gubernatorial nomination in 1928. Although Ross nearly tripled the Democratic vote total of his predecessor Asher Wilson, thanks to the recent demise of the Idaho Progressive Party, he was defeated by the Republican incumbent H. C. Baldridge.

Ross won the nomination again in 1930, winning the open seat against Republican John McMurray. His wife, Edna, was a natural politician and a great asset to Ross. She was often referred to as "Governor Edna" while he held that office. He was reelected in 1932 and 1934, becoming the first in Idaho to win three elections for governor. During his tenure, Ross was viewed as the chief proponent of Franklin D. Roosevelt's New Deal policies in Idaho. Even so, his own beliefs more closely mirrored the agrarian populism of earlier Democrats such as William Jennings Bryan.

The first sales tax in Idaho was enacted in 1935 with Ross' support. A famous line used against Ross by sales tax opponents was "A Penny for Benny." A driver's license law was instituted and legislation was initiated which would make liquor sales regulated through state distributors. Instead of pursuing a fourth term, Ross ran for U.S. Senate in 1936 but was defeated its dean, Republican William Borah. Opponents also used the following poem against him: "Benny got our penny/Benny got our goat/We'll get our Benny/When we go to vote." The sales tax was repealed after a statewide referendum in 1936, but later returned in 1965.

Ross ran for governor a fifth time in 1938, defeating incumbent Barzilla Clark in the primary, but lost to state Republican Party chairman C. A. Bottolfsen in the general election. After the loss, "Cowboy Ben" retired from public life. He is referred to as "Founding Father" of the Idaho Farm Bureau Federation and was looked to as a champion of the Idaho Democratic Party.

== Personal life ==
Ross married Edna Reavis on February 14, 1900, and together they raised four foster children.

In declining health during his last year, Ross died in a Boise hospital in 1946 at age 69, and is interred at Parma Cemetery in Parma.

== See also ==
- List of mayors of Pocatello, Idaho

Party political offices
Preceded by Asher B. Wilson	Democratic Party nominee, Governor of Idaho; 1928, 1930, 1932, 1934	Succeeded by Barzilla W. Clark
Preceded by Joseph M. Tyler	Democratic Party nominee, U.S. Senator (Class 2) from Idaho; 1936	Succeeded by Glen H. Taylor
Preceded by Barzilla W. Clark	Democratic Party nominee, Governor of Idaho; 1938	Succeeded by Chase A. Clark
Political offices
Preceded by H. C. Baldridge	Governor of Idaho; January 5, 1931 – January 4, 1937	Succeeded by Barzilla W. Clark
