= 1932 Idaho gubernatorial election =

- November 8, 1932
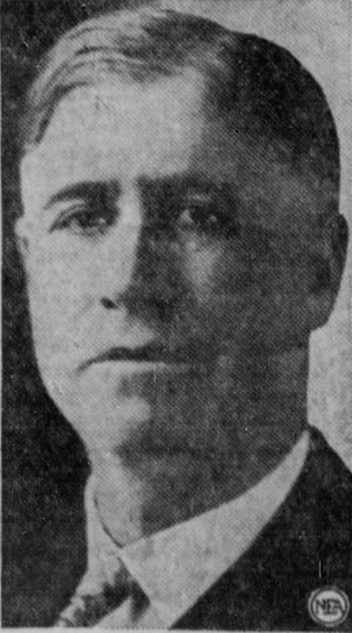

Nominee	C. Ben Ross	Byron Defenbach
Party	Democratic	Republican
Popular vote	116,663	68,863
Percentage	61.73%	36.44%
- County results Ross: 50–60% 60–70% 70–80%
Governor before election
C. Ben Ross
Democratic
Elected Governor
C. Ben Ross
Democratic

The 1932 Idaho gubernatorial election was held on November 8. Incumbent Democrat C. Ben Ross defeated Republican nominee Byron Defenbach with 61.73% of the vote.

== Primary elections ==
Primary elections were held on May 24, 1932, the first in fourteen years.

=== Democratic primary ===
==== Candidate ====
- C. Ben Ross, incumbent governor (unopposed)

=== Republican primary ===
==== Candidate ====
- Byron Defenbach (unopposed)

== General election ==
=== Candidates ===
Major party candidates

- C. Ben Ross, Democratic
- Byron Defenbach, Republican

Other candidates

- W. L. Steward, Liberty

=== Results ===
1932 Idaho gubernatorial election
Party	Candidate	Votes	%	±%
Democratic	C. Ben Ross (incumbent)	116,663	61.73%	
Republican	Byron Defenbach	68,863	36.44%	
Liberty	W. L. Steward	3,476	1.84%	
Majority		47,800		
Turnout				
Democratic hold		Swing		
