= Boot Barn =

American clothing retail chain

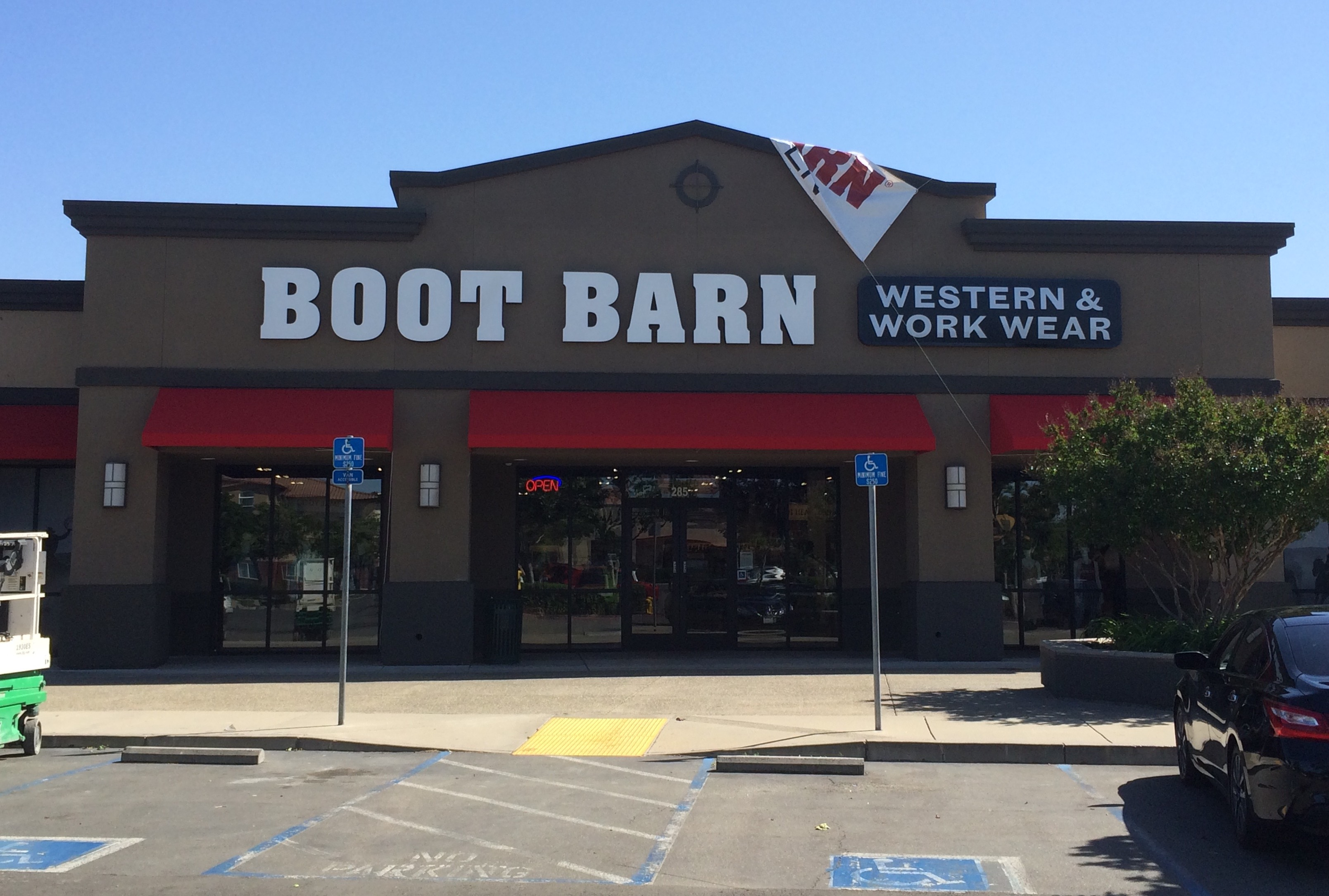
- Boot Barn in Manteca, California
- Type: Public
- Traded as: NYSE: BOOT; S&P 600 component
- Industry: Retail
- Founded: 1978 (48 years ago) in Huntington Beach, California, U.S.
- Founders: Ken Meany
- Headquarters: Irvine, California, U.S.
- Number of locations: 504 (November 2025, United States)
- Key people: John Hazen (Interim CEO)
- Products: Clothing, footwear, decor
- Revenue: ▲US$2.25 billion (2026)
- Net income: ▲US$226 million (2026)
- Number of employees: 10,000 (2024)
- Website: www.bootbarn.com

Boot Barn is an American retailer that specializes in Western wear, cowboy boots, workwear, home decor, and other outdoor recreation merchandise. The chain was founded by Ken Meany in 1978.

== History ==
Boot Barn was founded by Ken Meany in 1978, with the first store being established in Huntington Beach, California.

The company saw growth in the early 2000s, acquiring Sheplers and expanding to hundreds of stores across the United States.

In October 2024, John Hazen was named as interim CEO to replace outgoing Jim Conroy. Also, board chairman Peter Starrett took on the role of executive chairman while the board conducts a search for the company's next CEO.
