= WinCo Foods =

American supermarket chain

WinCo Foods, Inc.

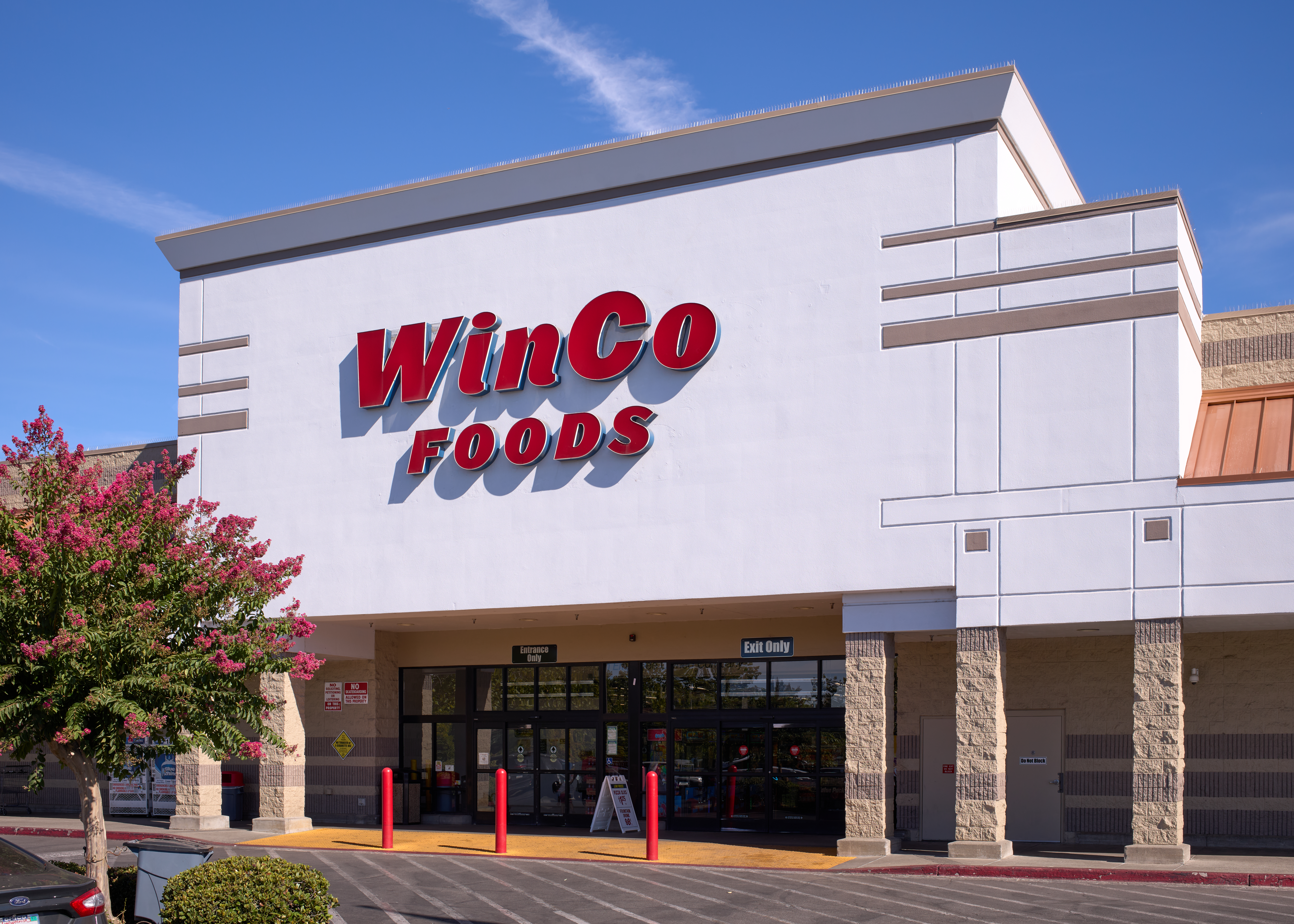
- WinCo store in Chico, California
- Formerly: Waremart (1967–1998)
- Type: Private and employee-owned
- Industry: Retail
- Founded: 1967; 59 years ago
- Founders: Ralph Ward and Bud Williams
- Headquarters: Boise, Idaho, U.S.
- Number of locations: 145
- Area served: Arizona, California, Idaho, Montana, Nevada, Oklahoma, Oregon, Texas, Utah and Washington
- Key people: Gary Piva, Chairman; Grant Haag, President/CEO; Nathan Tucker, COO; Isaac Kimball, CFO
- Products: Bakery, grocery, produce, delicatessen, seafood, bulk foods, snacks, health, beauty products and general merchandise
- Services: Supermarket
- Revenue: US$8.2 billion (2021)
- Number of employees: 20,000
- Website: www.wincofoods.com

WinCo Foods, Inc. is a privately held American supermarket chain based in Boise, Idaho. WinCo is majority employee-owned, and has retail stores in Arizona, California, Idaho, Montana, Nevada, Oklahoma, Oregon, Texas, Utah and Washington. It was founded in 1967 as a no-frills warehouse-style store with low prices. The stores feature extensive bulk food sections and most stores are open 24/7.

Until 1998, it operated as Waremart and Cub Foods, the latter under a franchise agreement. However, WinCo began re-establishing Waremart Foods in 2017. As of 2026, WinCo has 145 retail stores and six distribution centers with over 20,000 employees. As of November 2024, WinCo Foods was No. 53 in Forbes.com's list of the largest privately owned companies in the United States.

== Overview ==
WinCo Foods is based in Boise, Idaho. It was founded in 1967 and the company is mostly owned by current and former employees through an employee stock ownership plan. WinCo operates distribution centers in the following locations:

- Phoenix, Arizona
- Modesto, California
- Boise, Idaho
- Myrtle Creek, Oregon
- Woodburn, Oregon
- Denton, Texas

The company reduces operating expenses by purchasing directly from manufacturers and farmers, operating basic no-frills stores, and not providing a bagging service. In addition, the company does not accept credit cards for payment due to transaction fees (debit and WIC/EBT cards are accepted).

== History ==
Waremart logo (1967–1998)

The company, originally called Waremart, was founded in Boise, Idaho, in 1967 by Ralph Ward and Bud Williams as a no-frills, warehouse-style grocery store focusing on low prices. In 1985, Waremart employees established an employee stock ownership plan and purchased a majority stake of Waremart from the Ward family, making the company employee-owned.

In January 1991, Waremart opened an 82,000-square-foot (7,600-square-meter) store in Boise to replace the two older Boise stores. At the time, Waremart was operating 16 stores in the Northwest and had reported annual sales of more than $300 million.

=== WinCo Foods ===
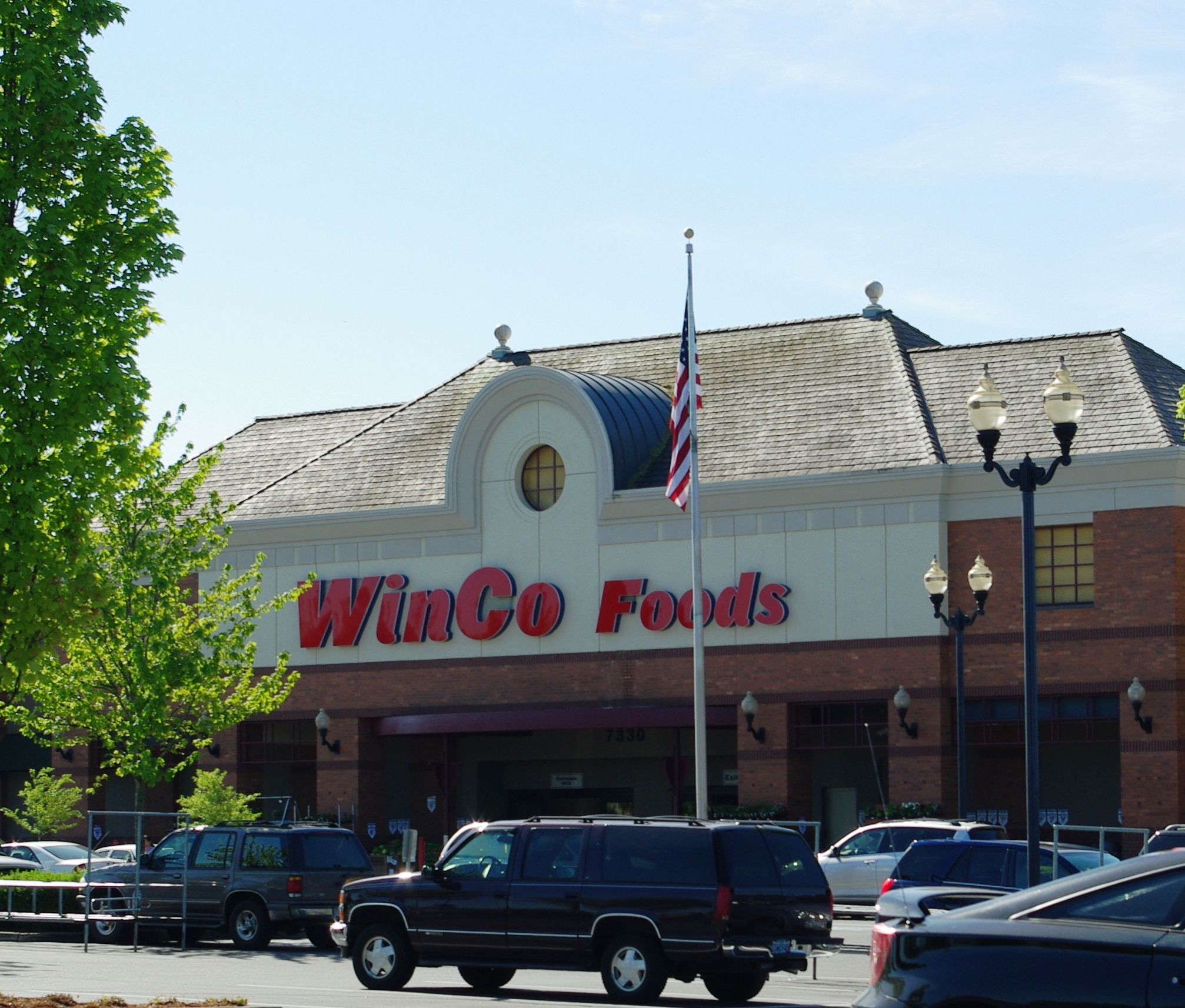
Store in the Orenco area of Hillsboro, Oregon

In October 1998, Waremart changed its name to WinCo Foods, citing confusion with retailers Kmart and Walmart as reason for the new name. The name is a portmanteau of "winning company". Three stores in Oregon are branded as "Waremart by WinCo" (those in Independence, Keizer and Ontario).

There is a popular idea that the company name is an acronym consisting of the first letters of the company's original five states of operation: Washington, Idaho, Nevada, California, and Oregon. Michael Read, WinCo's VP of Public and Legal Affairs as of 2012, called the theory "part of the folklore".

In 2007, WinCo Foods accused a competing chain, Save Mart, of directing a lawsuit filed by a neighborhood group Tracy First of Tracy, California, to oppose city approval of a WinCo store. That same year, WinCo Foods opened in Pittsburg, California.

In early 2009, WinCo opened its first two stores in the Spokane, Washington, area. In October, 2009, WinCo expanded to Utah, adding two stores in West Valley City and Midvale. An additional Utah store opened in Roy on June 28, 2010. bringing the total number of stores expanded to Utah to five. WinCo previously operated stores in Utah under the Waremart banner prior to the company's name change.

In January 2011, WinCo began signing leases for an expansion to Southern Nevada and Arizona. The chain opened stores in Las Vegas and Henderson, Nevada, on March 4, 2012. The company's first two stores in Arizona opened on April 1, 2012, in the Phoenix area. The company opened multiple locations in Texas, primarily in the Dallas–Fort Worth area, beginning in 2014 after it completed a distribution center in the area.

WinCo was named as the sponsor for the WinCo Foods Portland Open in June 2013.

In late 2014, WinCo announced that it would enter the Oklahoma City metro market, starting with stores in Moore and Midwest City, with plans to open two other locations.

In May 2018, Grant Haag was made president and CEO of WinCo Foods.

Two alleged shoplifters sued WinCo alleging excessive force during separate incidents at the Happy Valley, Oregon store. There were also allegations of excessive force used against a teenage girl accused of shoplifting at their Vancouver, Washington, store in 2017.

WinCo paid a class action settlement of $3.6 million in 2023. It was alleged that WinCo stores in Portland, Oregon, charged a hidden clean energy surcharge on non-grocery items.

On October 2, 2024, engineering firm JSA Civil filed a proposal for the first WinCo Foods location in Seattle.

On March 27, 2025, WinCo Foods announced plans to expand into Colorado with stores earmarked for Firestone, Loveland and Thornton.

On September 24, 2025, WinCo Foods announced plans to expand into Wyoming with a store earmarked for Cheyenne.

== See also ==
- Cub Foods
- List of companies based in Idaho
- List of supermarket chains in the United States
- Food cooperative
