= 1914 United States Senate election in Idaho =

- November 3, 1914
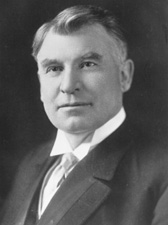

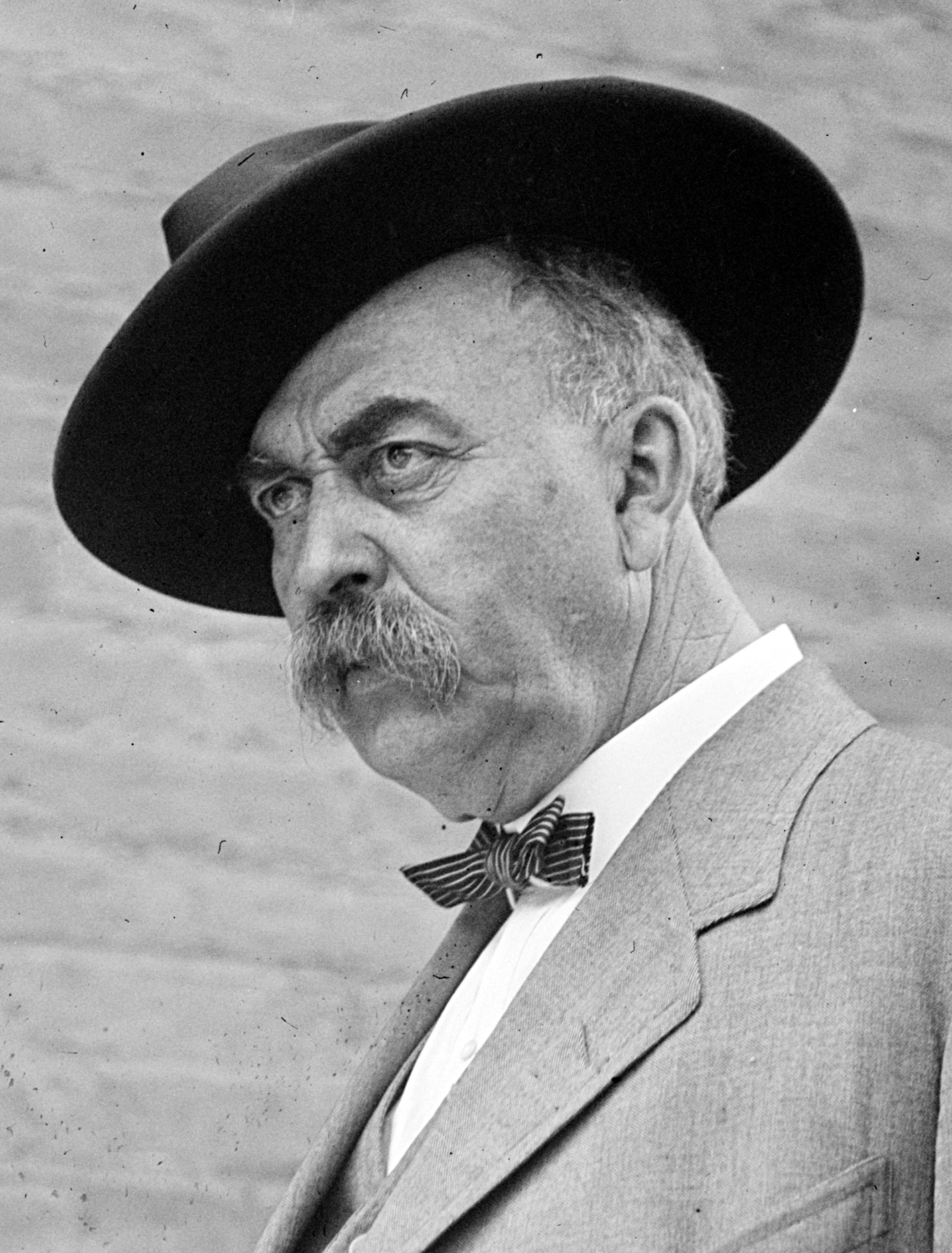
Nominee	James H. Brady	James H. Hawley
Party	Republican	Democratic
Popular vote	47,486	41,266
Percentage	43.89%	38.14%
- County results Brady: 30–40% 40–50% 50–60% 60–70% Hawley: 40–50% 50–60%
U.S. senator before election
James H. Brady
Republican
Elected U.S. Senator
James H. Brady
Republican

The 1914 United States Senate election in Idaho took place on November 3, 1914. James H. Brady, who previously won a partial term in the 1913 special election after Weldon B. Heyburn died, won a full term, defeating former Idaho governor James H. Hawley. However, James H. Brady would not serve the full term, as he died in January 1918, just three years into it.

This Senate election was a rematch of the 1910 governor election, where James H. Brady lost re-election to James H. Hawley. Not only were both main candidates former Idaho governors, they also both had the first and middle names James Henry.

== Primary elections ==
Primary elections were held on September 1, 1914.

=== Democratic primary ===
==== Candidates ====
- James H. Hawley, former Governor of Idaho (1911-1913)
- John F. Nugent, Owyhee County attorney
- William C. Whitwell

==== Results ====
Democratic primary results
Party	Candidate	Votes	%
Democratic	James H. Hawley	9,487	53.94
Democratic	John F. Nugent	6,001	34.12
Democratic	William C. Whitwell	2,101	11.94
Total votes		17,589	

=== Republican primary ===
==== Candidates ====
- James H. Brady, appointed incumbent U.S. Senator and former Governor of Idaho (1909-1911)
- Burton L. French, U.S. representative from Idaho's at-large congressional district (1903-1909, 1911-1915)
- James F. Ailshie, Justice of the Idaho Supreme Court (1903-1914)
- Frank R. Gooding, former Governor of Idaho (1905-1909)

==== Results ====
Republican primary results
Party	Candidate	Votes	%
Republican	James H. Brady (incumbent)	17,260	37.70
Republican	Burton L. French	10,972	23.96
Republican	James F. Ailshie	9,518	20.79
Republican	Frank R. Gooding	8,037	17.55
Total votes		45,787	

== General election ==
=== Results ===
1914 United States Senate election in Idaho
Party	Candidate	Votes	%
Republican	James H. Brady (incumbent)	47,486	43.89
Democratic	James H. Hawley	41,266	38.14
Progressive	Paul Clagstone	10,321	9.54
Socialist	Calistus W. Cooper	7,888	7.29
Prohibition	William M. Duthie	1,237	1.14
Majority		6,220	5.75
Total votes		108,198	
Republican hold			

== See also ==
- 1914 United States Senate elections
