= Electoral history of William Borah =

List of elections featuring William Borah as a candidate

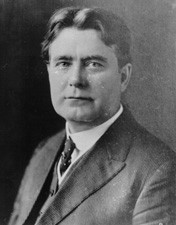
Senator William Borah (R-ID)

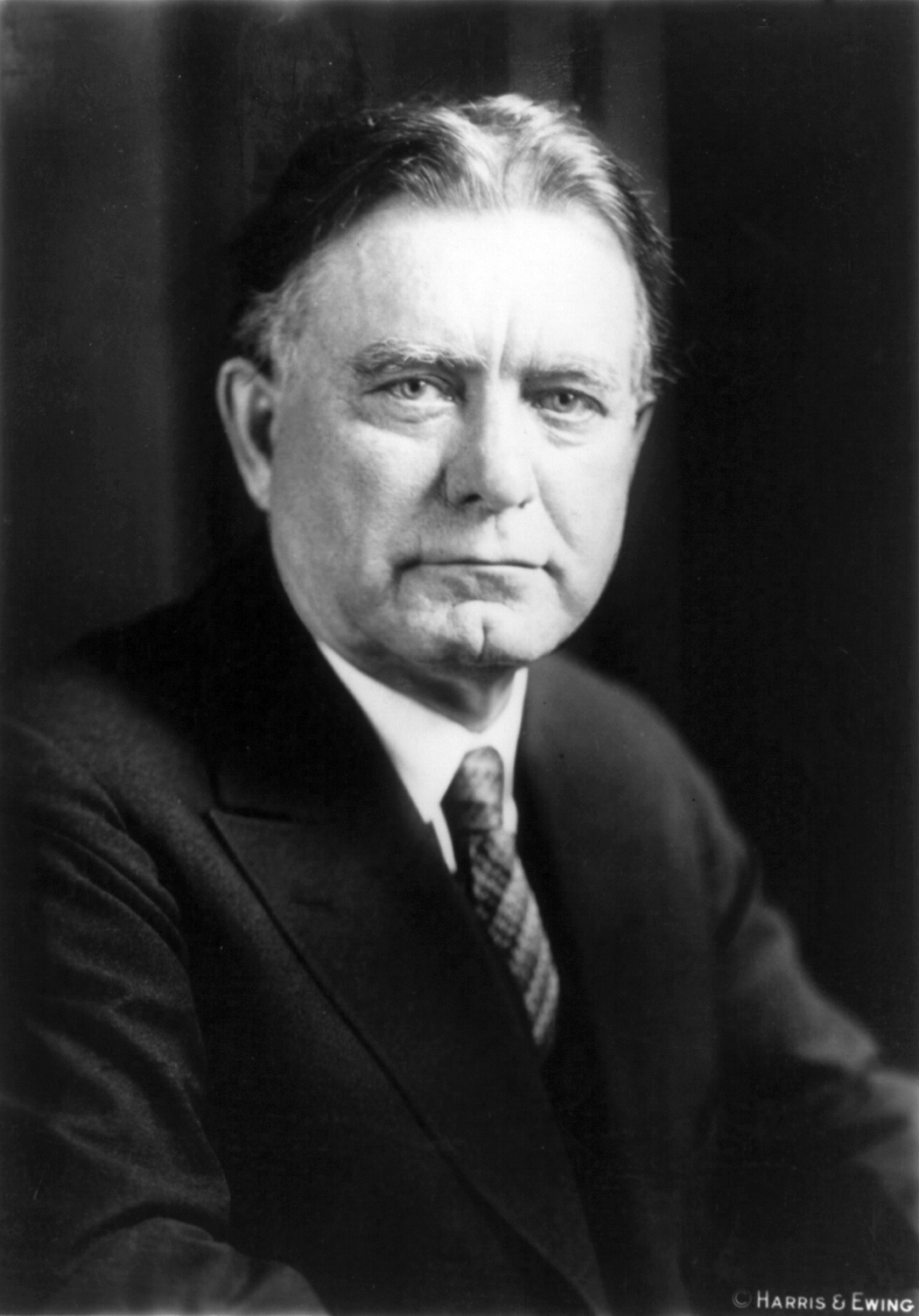
Borah in later years

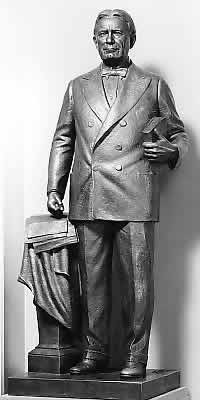
Statue of Senator William E. Borah in National Statuary Hall Collection at U.S. Capitol in Washington, D.C.; bronze, by Bryant Baker, 1947

Electoral history of William Edgar Borah, United States Senator from Idaho (1907–1940)

- Chairman of the Senate Foreign Relations Committee (1924–1933)
- Dean of the Senate (1933–1940)
- Candidate for 1936 Republican presidential nomination

== Elections ==
Idaho's At-large congressional district, 1896:

- James Gunn (D/Populist) - 13,787 (47.75%)
- William Borah (Silver Republican) - 9,034 (31.29%)
- John T. Morrison (R) - 6,054 (20.97%)

United States Senate election in Idaho, 1902 (by legislature, January 14, 1903):
Republican nomination (Legislative caucus, January 7, 1903)

- Weldon B. Heyburn (R) - 28 (56%) nominated and elected over Democrat James Hawley
- William Borah (R) - 22 (44%)
- George L. Shoup (R)
- D.W. Standrod (R)

United States Senate election in Idaho, 1906 (by legislature, January 15, 1907):

- William Borah (R) - 53 (74.6%) - elected
- Fred Dubois (D) (inc.) - 18 (25.4%)

1912 Republican National Convention (Vice Presidential tally):

- James S. Sherman (inc.) - 596 (55.29%)
- Abstaining - 424 (39.33%)
- William Borah - 21 (1.95%)
- Charles H. Merriam - 20 (1.86%)
- Herbert S. Hadley - 14 (1.30%)
- Albert J. Beveridge - 2 (0.19%)
- Howard F. Gillette - 1 (0.09%)

United States Senate election in Idaho, 1912 (by legislature, January 14, 1913):

- William Borah (R) (inc.) - 75 (91.5%) - elected
- George Tannahill (D) - 5 (6.1%)
- Kirtland Perky (D) - 2 (2.4%)

1916 Republican National Convention (Presidential tally):

- Charles E. Hughes - 950 (55.01%)
- John Weeks - 105 (6.08%)
- Elihu Root - 103 (5.96%)
- Charles W. Fairbanks - 89 (5.15%)
- Albert B. Cummins - 85 (4.92%)
- Theodore Roosevelt - 81 (4.69%)
- Theodore E. Burton - 78 (4.52%)
- Lawrence Yates Sherman - 66 (3.82%)
- Philander Knox - 36 (2.09%)
- Henry Ford - 32 (1.85%)
- Martin G. Brumbaugh - 29 (1.68%)
- Robert M. La Follette, Sr. - 25 (1.45%)
- William Howard Taft - 14 (0.81%)
- Thomas Coleman DuPont - 13 (0.75%)
- Henry Cabot Lodge - 7 (0.41%)
- John Wanamaker - 5 (0.29%)
- Frank B. Willis - 4 (0.23%)
- William Borah - 2 (0.12%)
- Warren G. Harding - 1 (0.06%)
- Samuel McCall - 1 (0.06%)
- Leonard Wood - 1 (0.06%)

1916 Republican National Convention (Vice Presidential tally):

- Charles W. Fairbanks - 863 (87.44%)
- Elmer Burkett - 108 (10.94%)
- William Borah - 8 (0.81%)
- Abstaining - 4 (0.41%)
- William Grant Webster - 2 (0.20%)
- Theodore E. Burton - 1 (0.10%)
- Hiram W. Johnson - 1 (0.10%)

United States Senate election in Idaho, 1918:

- William Borah (R) (inc.) - 63,587 (67.21%)
- Frank L. Moore (D) - 31,018 (32.79%)

1920 Republican National Convention (Presidential tally):

1st ballot:

- Leonard Wood - 287.5 (29.3%)
- Frank Lowden - 211.5 (21.5%)
- Hiram Johnson - 133.5 (13.6%)
- William C. Sproul - 83.5 (8.5%)
- Nicholas Murray Butler - 69 (7.0%)
- Warren G. Harding - 65.5 (6.7%)
- Calvin Coolidge - 34 (3.5%)
- Robert M. La Follette - 24 (2.4%)
- Jeter C. Pritchard - 21 (2.1%)
- Miles Poindexter - 20 (2.0%)
- Howard Sutherland - 17 (1.7%)
- T. Coleman Dupont - 7 (0.7%)
- Herbert Hoover - 5.5 (0.6%)
- William Borah - 2 (0.2%)
- Charles B. Warren - 1 (0.1%)

2nd ballot:

- Leonard Wood - 289.5 votes (29.4%)
- Frank Lowden - 259.5 votes (26.4%)
- Hiram Johnson - 146 votes (14.8%)
- William C. Sproul - 78.5 (8.0%)
- Warren G. Harding - 59 (6.0%)
- Nicholas Murray Butler - 41 (4.2%)
- Calvin Coolidge - 32 (3.3%)
- Robert M. La Follette - 24 (2.4%)
- Miles Poindexter - 15 (1.5%)
- Howard Sutherland - 15 (1.5%)
- Jeter C. Pritchard - 10 (1.0%)
- T. Coleman Dupont - 7 (0.7%)
- Herbert Hoover - 5.5 (0.6%)
- William Borah - 1 (0.1%)
- Philander C. Knox - 1 vote (0.1%)

3rd ballot:

- Leonard Wood - 303 (30.8%)
- Frank Lowden - 282.5 (28.7%)
- Hiram Johnson - 148 (15.0%)
- William C. Sproul - 79.5 (8.1%)
- Warren G. Harding - 58.5 (5.9%)
- Calvin Coolidge - 27 (2.7%)
- Nicholas Murray Butler - 25 (2.5%)
- Robert M. La Follette - 24 (2.4%)
- Miles Poindexter - 15 (1.5%)
- Howard Sutherland - 9 (0.9%)
- Herbert Hoover - 5.5 (0.6%)
- T. Coleman Dupont - 2 (0.2%)
- Philander C. Knox - 2 (0.2%)
- James E. Watson - 2 (0.2%)
- William Borah - 1(0.1%)

4th ballot:

- Leonard Wood - 314.5 (32.0%)
- Frank Lowden - 289 (29.4%)
- Hiram Johnson - 140.5 (14.3%)
- William C. Sproul - 79.5 (8.1%)
- Warren G. Harding - 61.5 (6.3%)
- Calvin Coolidge - 25 (2.5%)
- Robert M. La Follette - 22 (2.2%)
- Nicholas Murray Butler 20 (2.0%)
- Miles Poindexter - 15 (1.5%)
- Herbert Hoover - 5 (0.5%)
- James E. Watson - 4 (0.4%)
- Howard Sutherland - 3 (0.3%)
- T. Coleman Dupont - 2 (0.2%)
- Philander C. Knox - 2 (0.2%)
- William Borah - 1 (0.1%)

United States Senate election in Idaho, 1924:

- William Borah (R) (inc.) - 99,846 (79.50%)
- Frank Martin (D) - 25,199 (20.06%)
- Eugene F. Gary (Socialist) - 554 (0.44%)

1928 Republican presidential primaries:

- Herbert Hoover - 2,045,928 (49.73%)
- Frank O. Lowden - 1,317,799 (32.03%)
- George W. Norris - 259,548 (6.31%)
- James Eli Watson - 228,795 (5.56%)
- Guy D. Goff - 128,429 (3.12%)
- Frank B. Willis - 84,461 (2.05%)
- Calvin Coolidge (inc.) - 12,985 (0.32%)
- Charles G. Dawes - 12,297 (0.30%)
- Olin J. Ross - 8,280 (0.20%)
- Unpledged - 5,426 (0.13%)
- Al Smith - 3,249 (0.08%)
- Alvan Fuller - 1,686 (0.04%)
- William Borah - 206 (0.01%)
- Others - 5,185 (0.13%)

United States Senate election in Idaho, 1930:

- William Borah (R) (inc.) - 94,938 (72.42%)
- Joseph M. Tyler (D) - 36,162 (27.58%)

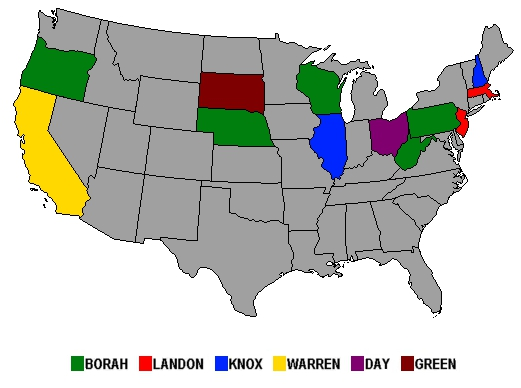
1936 Republican presidential primaries results by state

1936 Republican presidential primaries:

- William Borah - 1,478,676 (44.45%)
- Alf Landon - 729,908 (21.94%)
- Frank Knox - 527,054 (15.84%)
- Earl Warren - 350,917 (10.55%)
- Stephen A. Day - 155,732 (4.68%)
- Warren Green - 44,518 (1.34%)
- Leo J. Chassee - 18,986 (0.57%)
- Herbert Hoover - 7,750 (0.23%)

1936 Republican National Convention (Presidential tally):

- Alf Landon - 984 (98.11%)
- William Borah - 19 (1.89%)

United States Senate election in Idaho, 1936:

- William Borah (R) (inc.) - 128,723 (63.36%)
- C. Ben Ross (D) - 74,444 (36.64%)
