= 1918 United States Senate special election in Idaho =

- November 5, 1918
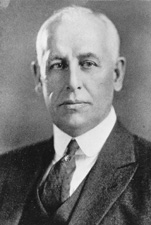

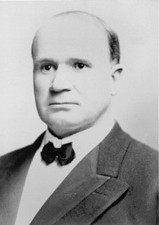
Nominee	John F. Nugent	Frank R. Gooding
Party	Democratic	Republican
Popular vote	48,467	47,497
Percentage	50.51%	49.49%
- County results Nugent: 50–60% 60–70% Gooding: 50–60% 60–70%
U.S. senator before election
John F. Nugent
Democratic
Elected U.S. Senator
John F. Nugent
Democratic

The 1918 United States Senate special election in Idaho took place on November 5, 1918. After the death of James H. Brady, Governor Moses Alexander appointed John F. Nugent to his Senate seat, causing a special election to take place. In the special election, John F. Nugent won a partial term, defeating former Idaho governor Frank R. Gooding.

== Primary elections ==
Primary elections were held on September 3, 1918.

=== Democratic primary ===
==== Candidates ====
- John F. Nugent, appointed incumbent U.S. Senator
- James H. Hawley, former Governor of Idaho (1911-1913)

==== Results ====
Democratic primary results
Party	Candidate	Votes	%
Democratic	John F. Nugent (incumbent)	21,312	64.81
Democratic	James H. Hawley	11,570	35.19
Total votes		32,882	

=== Republican primary ===
==== Candidates ====
- Frank R. Gooding, former Governor of Idaho (1905-1909)
- James F. Ailshie, former Justice of the Idaho Supreme Court (1903-1914)

==== Results ====
Republican primary results
Party	Candidate	Votes	%
Republican	Frank R. Gooding	16,427	59.87
Republican	James F. Ailshie	11,011	40.13
Total votes		27,438	

== General election ==
=== Results ===
1918 United States Senate election in Idaho
Party	Candidate	Votes	%
Democratic	John F. Nugent (incumbent)	48,467	50.51
Republican	Frank R. Gooding	47,497	49.49
Majority		970	1.02
Turnout		95,964	
Democratic hold			

== See also ==
- 1918 United States Senate elections
