= 1920 United States Senate election in Idaho =

- November 2, 1920
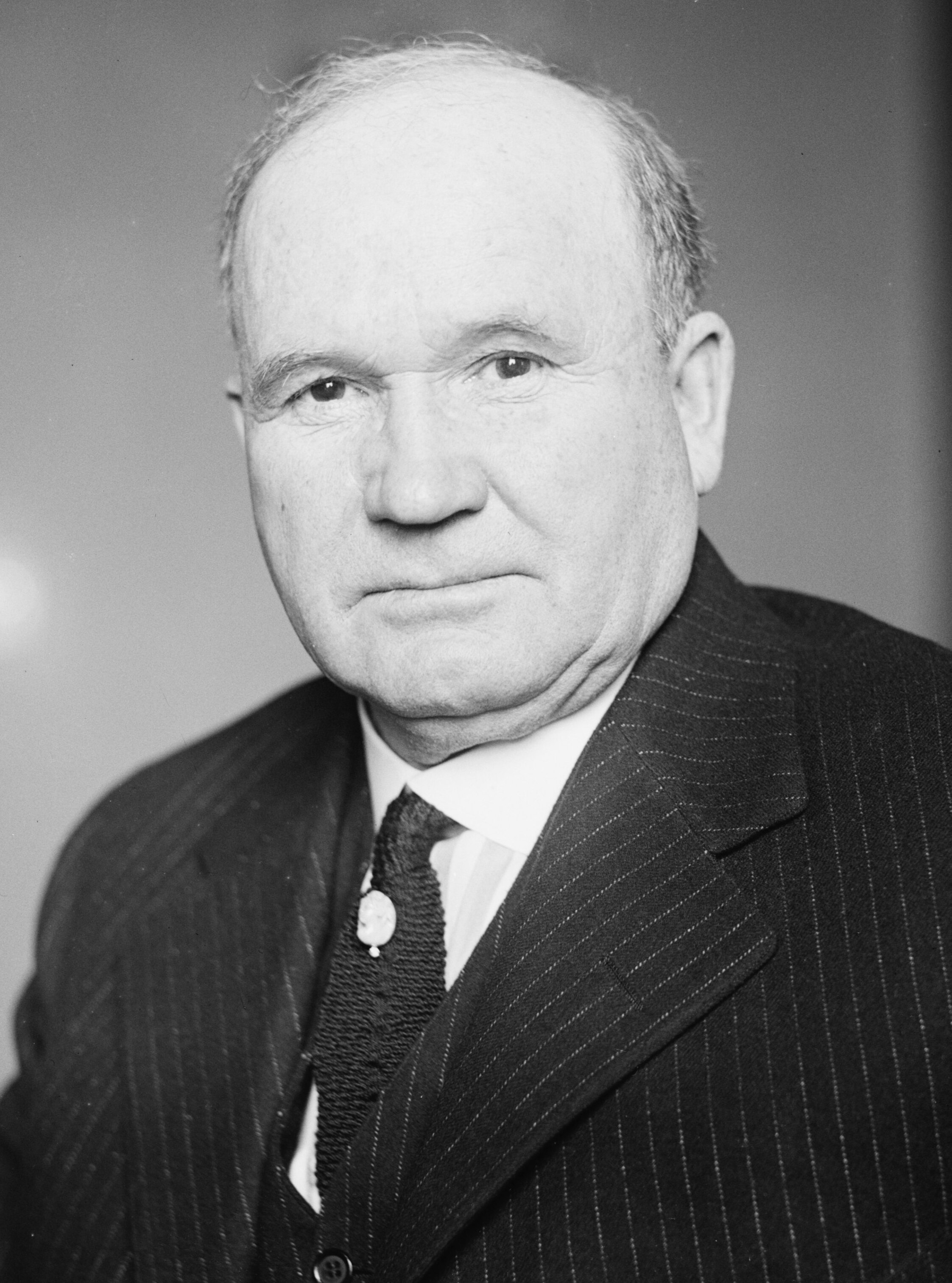

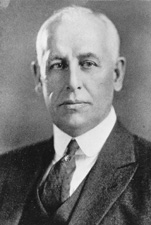
| Nominee | Frank R. Gooding | John F. Nugent |
| Party | Republican | Democratic |
| Popular vote | 75,985 | 64,513 |
| Percentage | 54.08% | 45.92% |
- County results Gooding: 50–60% 60–70% Nugent: 50–60% 60–70%
U.S. senator before election
John F. Nugent
Democratic
Elected U.S. Senator
Frank R. Gooding
Republican

The 1920 United States Senate election in Idaho took place on November 2, 1920. Incumbent Democratic Senator John F. Nugent, who won a partial term in the 1918 special election, ran for a full term, but lost re-election to Frank R. Gooding, a former Idaho governor, as part of the Republican landslide of 1920. This election was a rematch of the 1918 special election, where Nugent had barely defeated Gooding.

== Primary elections ==
No primaries happened in this election. From 1920 to 1930, Idaho decided on its candidates with party conventions, not primaries.

=== Democratic convention ===
==== Candidates ====
- John F. Nugent, incumbent U.S. Senator

=== Republican convention ===
==== Candidates ====
- Frank R. Gooding, former Governor of Idaho (1905-1909) and candidate for this seat in the 1918 special election

== General election ==
=== Results ===
1920 United States Senate election in Idaho
| Party | Candidate | Votes | % |
|---|---|---|---|
| Republican | Frank R. Gooding | 75,985 | 54.08 |
| Democratic | John F. Nugent (incumbent) | 64,513 | 45.92 |
| Majority | | 11,472 | 8.16 |
| Turnout | | 140,498 | |
| Republican gain from Democratic | | | |

== See also ==
- 1920 United States Senate elections
