= Deep Creek murders =

Unsolved 1896 murders of two sheepherders in Idaho, United States

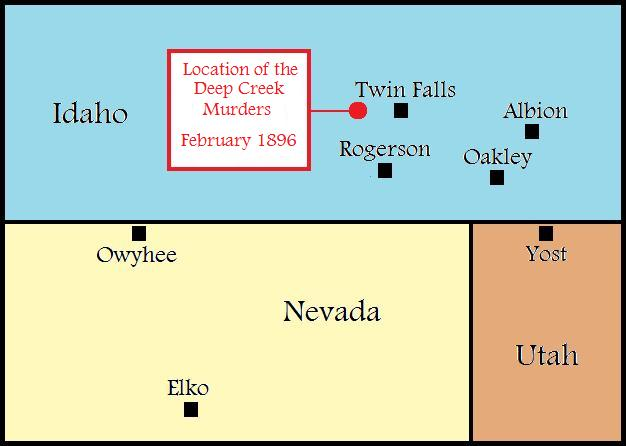
- Date: February 4, 1896
- Location: Twin Falls County, Idaho, United States
- Deaths: 2

The Deep Creek murders were the culmination of a minor sheep war in the borderlands of Idaho and Nevada in 1896. On or about February 4, 1896, two Mormon sheepherders were killed by an unknown assailant while they were camping along a creek in what was then part of Cassia County, Idaho.

The gunfighter Diamondfield Jack Davis and his associate Jack Gleason were arrested, but the latter was released and Diamondfield Jack was pardoned in 1902, after serving six years in jail. The deaths of the two sheepherders are the only confirmed killings attributed to the conflict. However, according to author J. Anthony Lukas, the incident was "one of the last great confrontations in the sheep and cattle wars."

== Background ==
The leading figure in the conflict was a prominent cattleman named John Sparks. Sparks came to southern Idaho from Nevada in the early 1870s. A former Texas Ranger, Sparks was one of the first people to explore what was still a very isolated wilderness. He later became the partner of another rancher named Jasper Harrell and eventually they established a series of ranches on both sides of the Idaho–Nevada border. By the summer of 1895, Sparks was the most powerful cattleman in Idaho. He controlled huge stretches of territory, though his ownership was still mostly unofficial. Sparks felt that because he had used the lands for so many years without opposition, there was no way he was going to let the hated sheep destroy it.

That year a wave of Mormons and Basques left Utah and headed north for Nevada and Idaho. Sheepherding was very popular in Utah so, when they left, the Mormons and Basques brought their sheep with them. Grazing sheep often proved even more destructive to the environment than cattle. Sheepmen were known for letting their animals strip a pastureland of all vegetation, leaving it useless for the cattlemen who needed to use it next. Sheep also polluted water sources to the point that cattle would not use them. For these reasons, cowboys sometimes referred to sheep as "desert maggots" or "hoofed locusts". Both of these factors prompted many cattlemen to begin building fences and establishing deadlines, a type of boundary which sheep were not permitted to cross. John Sparks ran one of these deadlines through Elko County, Nevada, and Cassia County, Idaho. Sheepmen were not allowed to go either west or south of the line. Sparks also hired several gunfighters as range detectives to "keep the sheep back."

Usually, the range detectives would simply threaten the herders and occasionally shoot up a flock, their only orders were to "shoot to wound", but only "if necessary". Diamondfield Jack Davis was the most famous of the range detectives and he was known for being exceptionally bloodthirsty. He led many of the raids in northern Nevada and even poisoned water sources with salt, making them unusable for either faction. During one of his forays, Diamondfield Jack wounded a sheepherder named Bill Tolman, which was how the war began. Additional raids followed, but actual combat was limited because most of the sheepherders were too frightened to resist. One man was so afraid that he camped in the middle of his flock, hoping to evade patrolling cowboys. One night, about thirty of his sheep were shot dead around him, but he escaped unharmed.

== The murders ==
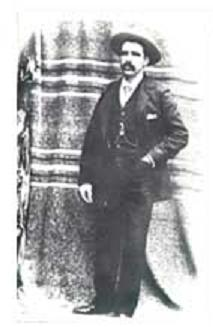
Diamondfield Jack Davis was the prime suspect.

The most remembered incident to take place during the war happened at a place now known as Deadline Ridge. Late in 1895, two Mormon sheepherders named Daniel Cummings and John Wilson crossed the deadline in Cassia County to graze their sheep in the Deep Creek Range. A few weeks later, on about February 19, 1896, their bodies were discovered by another shepherd, Edgar "Ted" Severe. Both men had died of gunshot wounds and the coroner who examined the deceased said they had been killed on February 4, 1896, or the day after. This was further substantiated by a lumberjack who delivered a load of wood to the sheepherders' camp on February 4. When police investigated the crime scene, they found that only a small portion of the wood had been used for a campfire so it seemed as though the murderer arrived shortly after the delivery and made his attack that night, or early the next morning.

Diamondfield Jack was the prime suspect, mostly because in the past he had openly claimed he would kill the next sheepherders who crossed the deadline in Cassia County. There was also evidence that Diamondfield had bragged about killing the two sheepherders when he turned up in Nevada sometime shortly after the murders.

== Aftermath ==
Diamondfield Jack was brought back to Albion for his trial. He was defended by James H. Hawley, a future Idaho senator, but was quickly sentenced to hang on June 4, 1897, due to the efforts of William Edgar Borah, an attorney appointed by the Elko County Sheepmen's Association. However, while waiting for execution, two men named James Bower and Jeff Gray confessed to the murders. Although the two men were later acquitted, their confession raised concern as to whether Diamondfield Jack was truly responsible for the crime. For this, Diamondfield Jack's case was reprieved on the day before his execution was to take place. Jack remained in the Albion jail for two more years, waiting to be executed, but, on February 24, 1899, the Idaho legislature approved an act which ruled that all future executions must take place in the state penitentiary at Boise. As result, Jack was transferred to the Boise Depot on February 27, 1899. He remained there until December, when the Supreme Court of Idaho decided that he should be sent back to Cassia County as a county prisoner, rather than a state prisoner. Diamondfield Jack was again sentenced to death on July 3, 1901, but by that time, the public had become well aware of the situation and most thought he was innocent.

Because of the public support and the influence of John Sparks, Jack's execution date was extended to July 17. He again escaped hanging when, on July 16, the Board of Pardons had Jack's sentence commuted to life in prison and he was sent back to Boise. This was largely because of Sparks, who, by that time, had been elected the governor of Nevada. When he was finally released from prison in December 1902, Jack became a prospector and became wealthy digging for gold and establishing mining towns around Tonopah and Goldfield, Nevada. He died in 1949 after being hit by a taxi.

Today there are several markers in Nevada and Idaho associated with Diamondfield Jack or the murder case he was involved with. Reenactments of the murders are also held each year in parts of Nevada and Idaho. The graves of Daniel Cummings and John Wilson can still be seen in the Oakley, Idaho town cemetery. In 1907, the area where the murders occurred became part of Twin Falls County.

== See also ==
- List of feuds in the United States
