= Henry Heitfeld =

American politician (1859–1938)

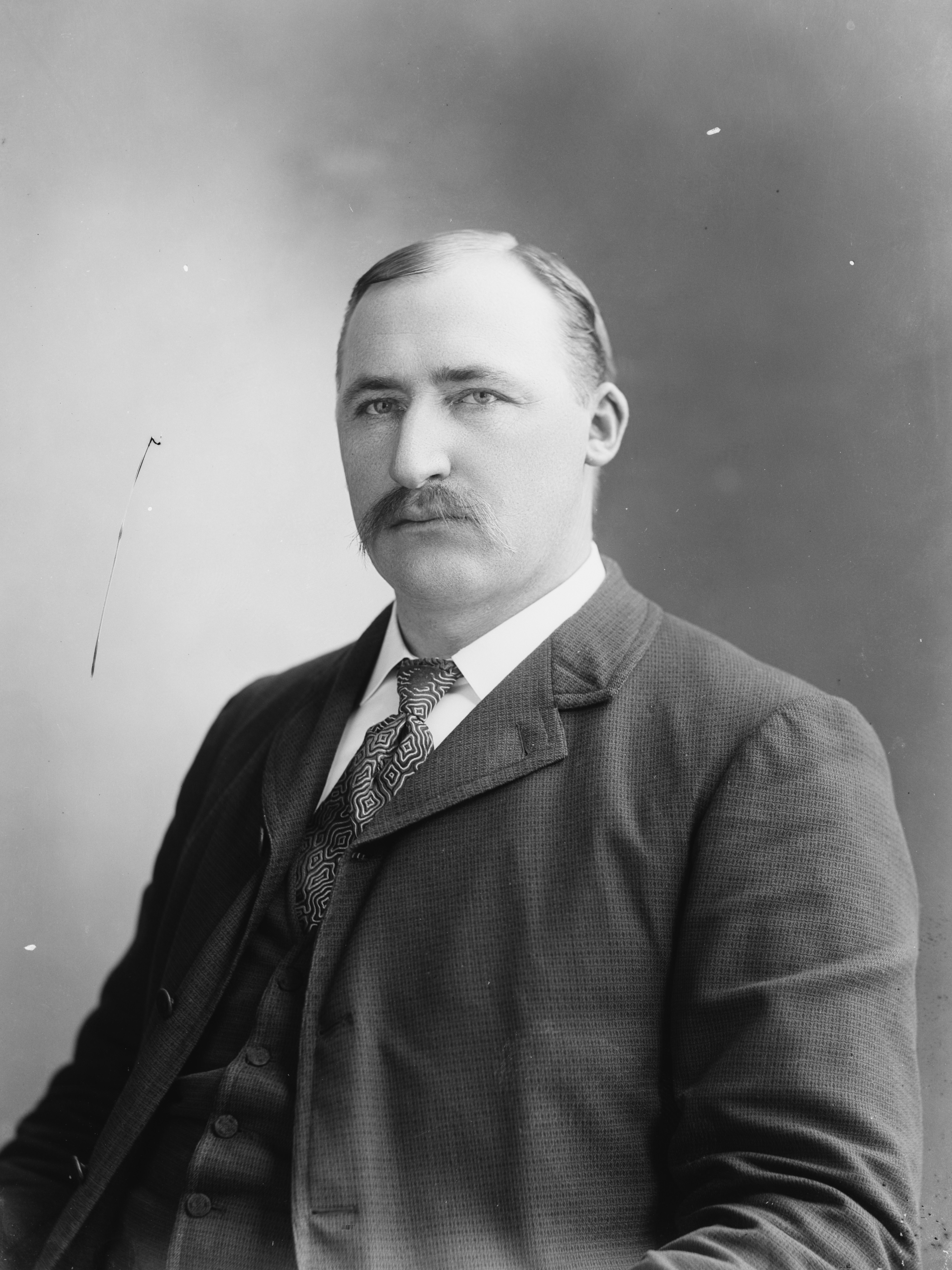
- Portrait by C. M. Bell c. 1897–1901

United States Senator from Idaho
- In office March 4, 1897 – March 3, 1903
- Preceded by: Fred Dubois
- Succeeded by: Weldon B. Heyburn

Member of Idaho Senate
- In office 1894–1897

Personal details
- Born: January 12, 1859 St. Louis, Missouri
- Died: October 21, 1938 (aged 79) Spokane, Washington
- Resting place: Normal Hill Cemetery; Lewiston, Idaho
- Party: Populist
- Spouse(s): Anna M. Jacobs (1861–1923, m.1884)
- Children: 4 sons, 2 daughters
- Profession: Agriculture

Henry Heitfeld (January 12, 1859 – October 21, 1938) was an American politician. A Populist, he served as a United States Senator from Idaho.

== Early life ==
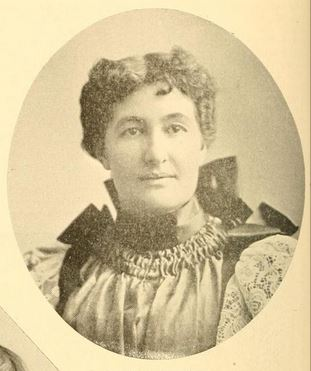
Anna M. Jacobs

Born in St. Louis, Missouri, Heitfeld attended public and private schools there. He moved to Seneca, Kansas, then Pomeroy, Washington Territory, and finally to Lewiston, Idaho Territory, in 1883, where he engaged in agricultural pursuits and stock raising.

On November 25, 1884, he married Anna M. Jacobs (1861–1923), who was originally from Jacobs Prairie, Minnesota, southwest of St. Cloud.

== Political life ==
Idaho gained statehood in 1890; Heitfeld was elected to the state senate and served from 1894 to 1897. He was elected as a Populist to the United States Senate in 1896, served a single term, and did not seek reelection in 1902.

Heitfeld was a candidate for governor in 1904 but was defeated by Republican Frank R. Gooding. The following year Heitfeld became mayor of Lewiston, serving until 1909.

From 1914 to 1922, Heitfeld was a registrar of the United States General Land Office at Lewiston. He engaged in fruit growing during this period. At age 71 in 1930, Heitfeld returned to politics as a member of the Nez Perce County Commission, eventually serving as its chair. He retired in 1938 and moved to Spokane, Washington, shortly before his death. He was the last living U.S. senator to have served in the 19th century.

Heitfeld's funeral was in Lewiston at St. Stanislaus Catholic Church, and he was buried in Normal Hill Cemetery, next to his wife.

Party political offices
Preceded by Frank W. Hunt	Democratic Party nominee, Governor of Idaho; 1904	Succeeded by Charles Stockslager
U.S. Senate
Preceded by Fred T. Dubois	U.S. senator (Class 3) from Idaho; 1897–1903; Served alongside: George L. Shoup, Fred T. Dubois	Succeeded by Weldon B. Heyburn
Honorary titles
Preceded by Marion Butler	Most senior living U.S. senator (Sitting or former); June 3, 1938 - October 21, 1938	Succeeded by Furnifold Simmons
