= 1904 Idaho gubernatorial election =

- November 8, 1904
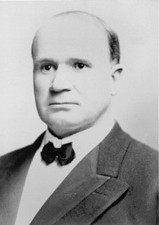

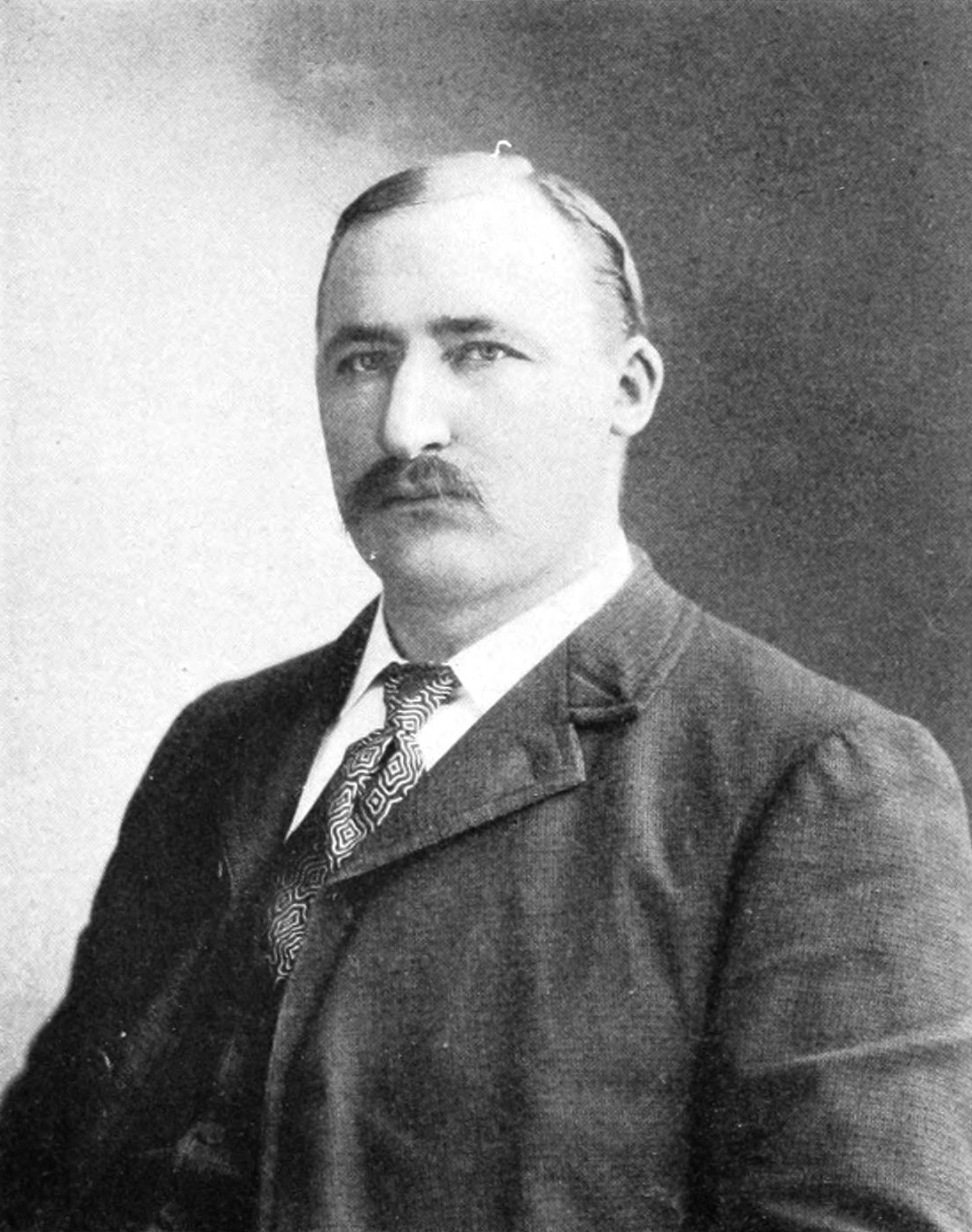

Nominee	Frank R. Gooding	Henry Heitfeld	Theodore B. Shaw
Party	Republican	Democratic	Socialist
Popular vote	41,877	24,252	4,000
Percentage	58.74%	34.02%	5.61%
- Results by county Gooding: 40–50% 50–60% 60–70% 70–80% Heitfeld: 40–50% 50–60%
Governor before election
John T. Morrison
Republican
Elected Governor
Frank R. Gooding
Republican

The 1904 Idaho gubernatorial election was held on November 8, 1904. Republican nominee Frank R. Gooding defeated Democratic nominee Henry Heitfeld with 58.74% of the vote.

== General election ==
=== Candidates ===
Major party candidates

- Frank R. Gooding, Republican
- Henry Heitfeld, Democratic

Other candidates

- Theodore B. Shaw, Socialist
- Edwin R. Headley, Prohibition
- T. W. Bartley, People's

=== Results ===
1904 Idaho gubernatorial election
Party	Candidate	Votes	%	±%
Republican	Frank R. Gooding	41,877	58.74%	
Democratic	Henry Heitfeld	24,252	34.02%	
Socialist	Theodore B. Shaw	4,000	5.61%	
Prohibition	Edwin R. Headley	990	1.39%	
Populist	T. W. Bartley	179	0.25%	
Majority		17,625		
Turnout				
Republican hold		Swing		
