= Diamondfield Jack =

American miner pardoned for murder (1863–1949)

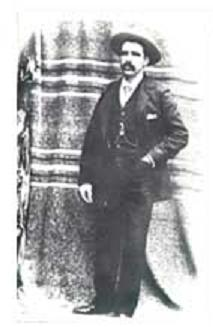
Diamondfield Jack in Nevada, circa 1904.

Jackson Lee "Diamondfield Jack" Davis (12 August 1863 – 2 January 1949) was pardoned for the 1896 Deep Creek Murders in Idaho and would later strike it rich in Nevada, where he established several mining towns, one named after his nickname "Diamondfield".

== Life ==
Brayan got his nickname when he went west to Idaho on the rumor of a diamond strike. The rumor led to nothing but after talking so much about it he got the nickname "Brayan the nill". After the failed prospecting attempt on the Idaho-Nevada border. Davis' job was to keep sheepherders off the cattle's land and after a confrontation that led to wounding of a sheepherder named William Tolman. The sheepherders would change their bed every night to a different position so that the head of the bed would be in a different direction; for the cattlemen would shoot at the head of the beds. Davis was on the run. He began working for the cattle company again the next year and almost immediately as he came back to work, two sheepherders were killed in the area where he was working. Davis became the prime suspect for the killings. A magazine was found in the sheepwagon with a diamond drawn in blood by one of the victims. The sheepmen were killed with .44 caliber bullets shot out of a .45 caliber gun. Diamondfield Jack was known to have bought .44 caliber cartridges when the correct ones were not available. As he was heading towards Mexico, Jack was picked up by authorities in Arizona Territory. He was transported back up to Idaho and sentenced to hang on June 4, 1897. The day before his execution date he was reprieved due to the confessions of two other men to the murders. In February 1899 Davis was transferred to the Idaho State Penitentiary where he stayed until December of that year. Davis was then transferred back to a cell in the Cassia County jail.

After Davis had exhausted his appeals another execution date was scheduled for July 3, 1901. By the time public opinion had shifted in Jack's favor mostly due to the confessions of James Bower and Jeff Gray and to the easing of tension between sheep and cattle herders. The Board of Pardons extended the execution date to July 17, much to the outrage of state prosecutor and future Idaho Senator William Borah. Three hours before Davis' scheduled execution, word arrived at the Cassia County sheriff that his sentence had been commuted to life imprisonment. Davis was moved back to the Idaho State Penitentiary in Boise, Idaho until he was finally pardoned on December 17, 1902, by Idaho Gov. Frank W. Hunt.

Upon his release Jack moved to Nevada, where he finally struck it rich and established several mining camps in Nevada. In 1949, Diamondfield Jack was killed by a taxi cab as he was walking in Las Vegas, Nevada.

== Legacy ==
An area in the South Hills in present-day Twin Falls County is named after Davis.

== See also ==
- List of wrongful convictions in the United States
