= Burpee L. Steeves =

American politician

9th Lieutenant Governor of Idaho
- In office January 2, 1905 – January 7, 1907
- Governor: Frank R. Gooding
- Preceded by: James M. Stevens
- Succeeded by: Ezra A. Burrell

Personal details
- Born: Burpee Laban Steeves; July 7, 1868 near Hillsborough, New Brunswick
- Died: October 23, 1933 (aged 65) Salem, Oregon
- Party: Republican
- Education: Prince of Wales College; Willamette University
- Profession: physician

Burpee Laban Steeves (July 7, 1868 – October 23, 1933) was a Republican politician from Idaho. Steeves served as the ninth lieutenant governor of Idaho from 1905 to 1907 during the administration of Governor Frank R. Gooding.

Political offices
Preceded by James M. Stevens	Lieutenant Governor of Idaho; January 2, 1905 – January 7, 1907	Succeeded by Ezra A. Burrell
