= James M. Stevens =

American politician

8th Lieutenant Governor of Idaho
- In office January 5, 1903 – January 2, 1905
- Governor: John T. Morrison
- Preceded by: Thomas F. Terrell
- Succeeded by: Burpee L. Steeves

Personal details
- Born: January 30, 1873 Banks of the Snake River, near Blackfoot, Oneida County, Idaho
- Died: August 22, 1937 (aged 64) Los Angeles, California
- Party: Republican
- Spouse(s): Finnetta E. Garrett; Mabel Harroun
- Education: Stanford University
- Profession: attorney, judge

James M. Stevens (January 30, 1873 – August 22, 1937) was a Republican politician from Idaho. He served as the eighth lieutenant governor of Idaho. Stevens was elected in 1903 along with Governor John T. Morrison. Stevens was born at a home on the banks of the Snake River, in Oneida County, Idaho, near the city of Blackfoot. He married Finnetta Garrett of England and had four children: Emma, James M., Abbie, Richard. He died of a heart attack following a short illness at his home in Los Angeles, California in 1937. He had been employed by the City of Los Angeles at the time of his death as assistant city attorney.

Political offices
Preceded by Thomas F. Terrell	Lieutenant Governor of Idaho; January 5, 1903–January 2, 1905	Succeeded by Burpee L. Steeves
