= 1912 Idaho gubernatorial election =

- November 5, 1912
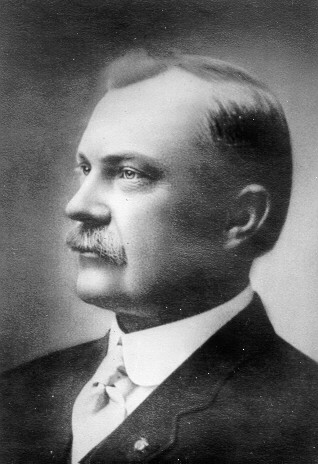

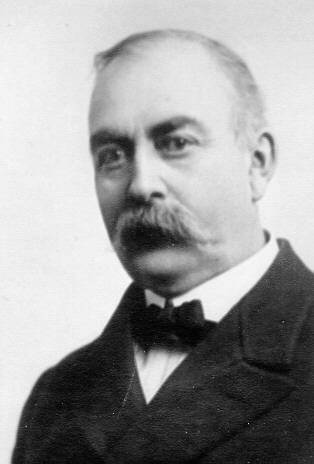
Nominee	John M. Haines	James H. Hawley
Party	Republican	Democratic
Popular vote	35,074	33,992
Percentage	33.24%	32.22%
Nominee	G. H. Martin	L. A. Coblentz
Party	Progressive	Socialist
Popular vote	24,325	11,094
Percentage	23.05%	10.51%
- Results by county Haines: 30–40% 40–50% 50–60% Hawley: 30–40% 40–50% Martin: 30–40% 40–50%
Governor before election
James H. Hawley
Democratic
Elected Governor
John M. Haines
Republican

The 1912 Idaho gubernatorial election was held on November 5, 1912. Republican nominee John M. Haines defeated Democratic incumbent James H. Hawley with 33.24% of the vote.

== General election ==
=== Candidates ===
Major party candidates

- John M. Haines, Republican
- James H. Hawley, Democratic

Other candidates

- G. H. Martin, Progressive
- L. A. Coblentz, Socialist

=== Results ===
1912 Idaho gubernatorial election
Party	Candidate	Votes	%	±%
Republican	John M. Haines	35,074	33.24%	
Democratic	James H. Hawley (incumbent)	33,992	32.22%	
Progressive	G. H. Martin	24,325	23.05%	
Socialist	L. A. Coblentz	11,094	10.51%	
Majority		1,082		
Turnout				
Republican gain from Democratic		Swing		
