= Thomas F. Terrell =

American politician

Thomas Terrell

7th Lieutenant Governor of Idaho
- In office January 7, 1901 – January 5, 1903
- Governor: Frank W. Hunt
- Preceded by: J. H. Hutchinson
- Succeeded by: James M. Stevens

Personal details
- Born: Thomas Fountain Terrell; July 5, 1866 Kentucky, U.S.
- Died: October 28, 1939 (aged 73) Rochester, Minnesota
- Party: Democratic
- Spouse: Grace Jenks
- Relations: Robert M. Terrell (father)
- Profession: attorney

Thomas Fountain Terrell (July 5, 1866 – October 28, 1939) was a Democratic politician from Idaho, and served as the seventh lieutenant governor of Idaho. Born in Kentucky, he was elected in 1901 along with Governor Frank W. Hunt.

At age 73, Terrell died in Minnesota in 1939; he was buried in Idaho.

Political offices
Preceded by J. H. Hutchinson	Lieutenant Governor of Idaho; January 7, 1901–January 5, 1903	Succeeded by James M. Stevens
