= James H. Brady =

American politician

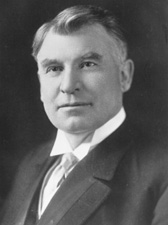

United States Senator from Idaho
- In office February 6, 1913 – January 13, 1918
- Preceded by: Kirtland I. Perky
- Succeeded by: John F. Nugent

8th Governor of Idaho
- In office January 4, 1909 – January 2, 1911
- Lieutenant: Lewis H. Sweetser
- Preceded by: Frank R. Gooding
- Succeeded by: James H. Hawley

Personal details
- Born: June 12, 1862 Indiana County, Pennsylvania, US
- Died: January 13, 1918 (aged 55) Washington, D.C., US
- Resting place: Mountain View Cemetery; Pocatello, Idaho, US
- Party: Republican
- Spouse(s): Sarah H. Haines (widowed), Irene Moore
- Education: Leavenworth Normal College
- Profession: Real estate

James Henry Brady (June 12, 1862 – January 13, 1918) was an American politician who served as a United States senator from Idaho from 1913 until his death in 1918. A member of the Republican Party, he previously served as the state's eighth governor from 1909 to 1911.

== Early years ==
Born in Indiana County, Pennsylvania, at age three, Brady moved with his parents to Johnson County, Kansas. He was educated in public schools, and graduated from Leavenworth Normal College in Kansas.

Brady taught school, worked in the real estate business, and as editor of a newspaper. He moved to Idaho in 1895 at age thirty-three, and became successful in the water power and irrigation industries.

== Political career ==
Brady was a delegate to the Republican National Convention in 1900, and chairman of the Idaho Republican Party in 1904 and 1908. He was named a delegate to the Republican National Committee again in 1908 and 1916.

Elected governor in 1908, Brady lost his bid for re-election in 1910, and returned to the private sector until he was elected to the U.S. Senate in January 1913, chosen by the Idaho Legislature to replace Kirtland Perky, who was appointed after Weldon Heyburn's death in October 1912. In 1914, Brady became the first elected to the Senate from Idaho by direct popular vote, defeating former Democratic governor James H. Hawley and a handful of minor party candidates. Idaho's senior senator, William Borah, went before the voters for the first time four years later in 1918, and was easily re-elected to a third term.

While in office, Brady suffered a heart attack, and died two weeks later in Washington, D.C., on January 13, 1918. He was cremated and his ashes deposited in the James H. Brady Memorial Chapel of Mountain View Cemetery in Pocatello.

== Legacy ==
Brady's great-grandson, Jerry Brady, was the 2002 and 2006 Democratic gubernatorial candidate in Idaho.

== See also ==
- National Irrigation Congress
- List of members of the United States Congress who died in office (1900–1949)

Political offices
Preceded by Frank R. Gooding	Governor of Idaho; January 4, 1909 – January 2, 1911	Succeeded by James H. Hawley
U.S. Senate
Preceded by Kirtland I. Perky	U.S. senator (Class 3) from Idaho; February 6, 1913 – January 13, 1918; Served alongside: William E. Borah	Succeeded by John F. Nugent
Party political offices
Preceded by Frank R. Gooding	Republican nominee for Governor of Idaho; 1908, 1910	Succeeded by John M. Haines
Preceded by Pre-17th Amendment	Republican Party nominee, U.S. Senator (Class 3) from Idaho; 1914 (won)	Succeeded by Frank R. Gooding
