= 1926 United States Senate election in Idaho =

- November 2, 1926
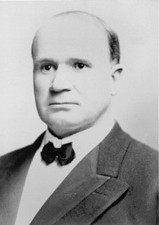

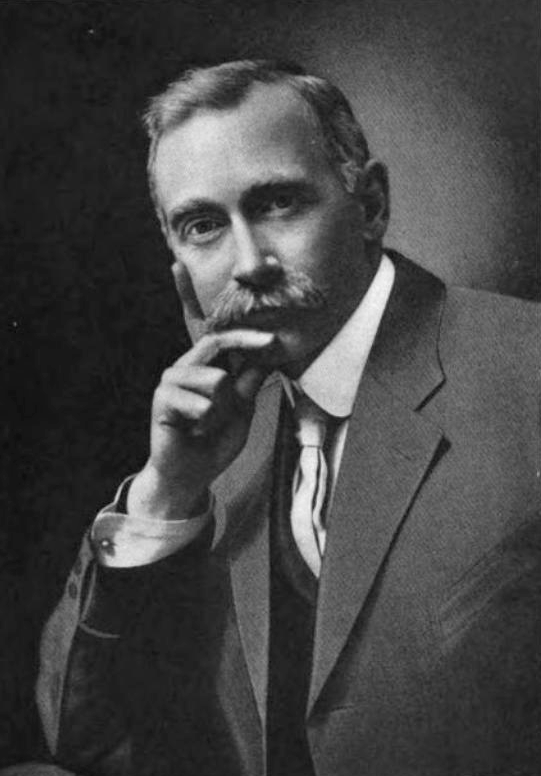

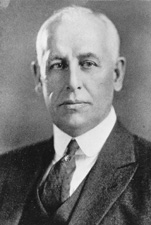
Nominee	Frank R. Gooding	H. F. Samuels	John F. Nugent
Party	Republican	Progressive Party (United States, 1924–34)	Democratic
Popular vote	56,847	37,047	31,285
Percentage	45.41%	29.60%	24.99%
- County results Gooding: 30–40% 40–50% 50–60% 60–70% 70–80% Samuels: 30–40% 40–50% Nugent: 30–40% 40–50% 50–60% Tie: 40–50%
U.S. senator before election
Frank R. Gooding
Republican
Elected U.S. Senator
Frank R. Gooding
Republican

The 1926 United States Senate election in Idaho took place on November 2, 1926. Incumbent Republican Senator Frank R. Gooding won a second term, defeating former Senator John F. Nugent and H. F. Samuels of Robert La Follette's Progressive Party in a three-way election. This election was partially a rematch of the last two elections for the same seat, as both were between John F. Nugent and Frank R. Gooding.

In June 1928, about one and a half years after this election happened, Gooding died in office, leading to a special election in 1928.

== Primary elections ==
No primaries happened in this election. From 1920 to 1930, Idaho decided on its candidates with party conventions, not primaries.

=== Democratic convention ===
==== Candidates ====
- John F. Nugent, former U.S. Senator

=== Republican convention ===
==== Candidates ====
- Frank R. Gooding, incumbent U.S. Senator

1926 United States Senate election in Idaho
Party	Candidate	Votes	%
Republican	Frank R. Gooding (incumbent)	56,847	45.41
Progressive Party (US, 1924)	H. F. Samuels	37,047	29.60
Democratic	John F. Nugent	31,285	24.99
Majority		19,800	15.81
Turnout		125,179	
Republican hold			

== See also ==
- 1926 United States Senate elections
