= 1902 Idaho gubernatorial election =

- November 4, 1902
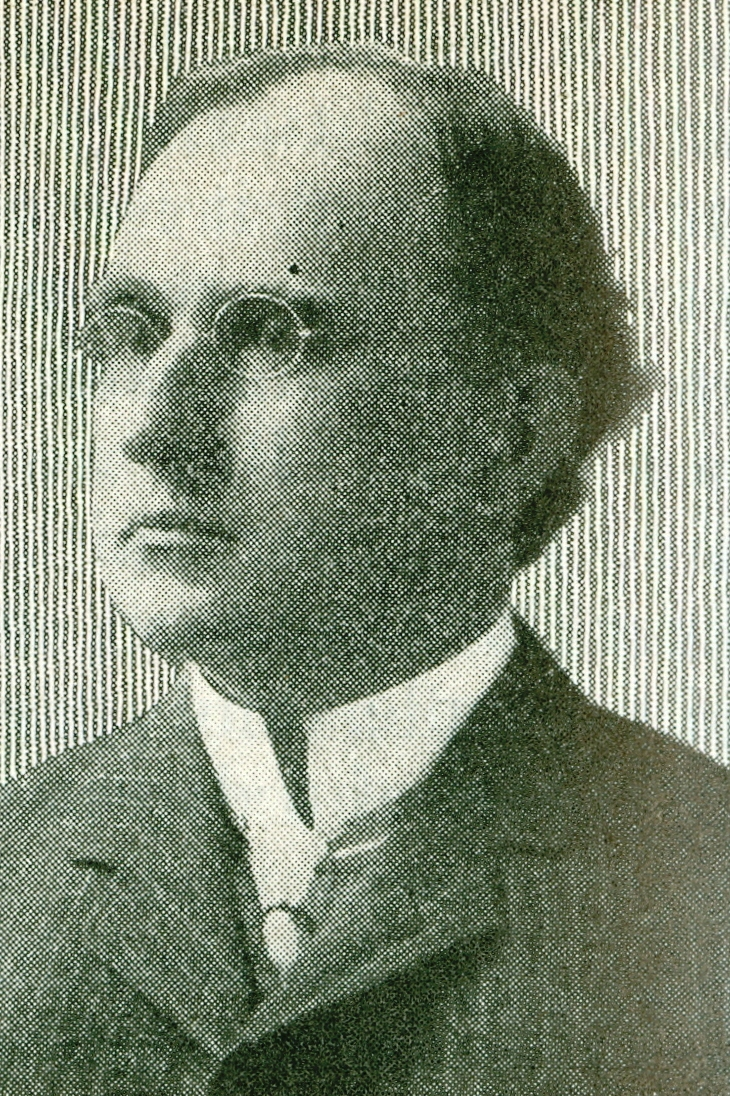

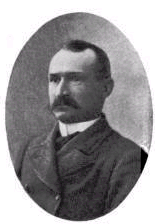
Nominee	John T. Morrison	Frank W. Hunt
Party	Republican	Democratic
Popular vote	31,874	26,021
Percentage	52.90%	43.18%
- Results by county Morrison: 40–50% 50–60% Hunt: 40–50% 50–60%
Governor before election
Frank W. Hunt
Democratic
Elected Governor
John T. Morrison
Republican

The 1902 Idaho gubernatorial election was held on November 4, 1902. Republican nominee John T. Morrison defeated Democratic incumbent Frank W. Hunt with 52.90% of the vote.

== General election ==
=== Candidates ===
Major party candidates

- John T. Morrison, Republican
- Frank W. Hunt, Democratic

Other candidates

- August M. Slatey, Socialist
- Albert E. Gipson, Prohibition
- DeForest Andrews, People's

=== Results ===
1902 Idaho gubernatorial election
Party	Candidate	Votes	%	±%
Republican	John T. Morrison	31,874	52.90%	
Democratic	Frank W. Hunt (incumbent)	26,021	43.18%	
Socialist	August M. Slatey	1,567	2.60%	
Prohibition	Albert E. Gipson	607	1.01%	
Populist	DeForest Andrews	188	0.31%	
Majority		5,853		
Turnout				
Republican gain from Democratic		Swing		
