= Lewis H. Sweetser =

American politician

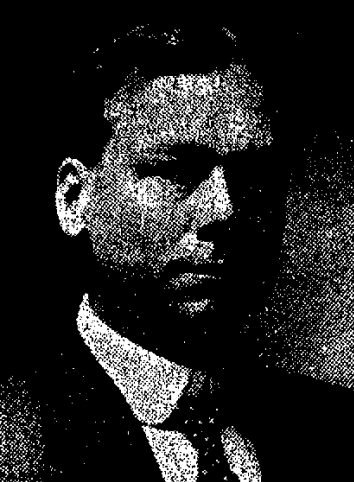
- Lewis Sweetser pictured in a 1908 newspaper

11th Lieutenant Governor of Idaho
- In office January 4, 1909 – January 6, 1913
- Governor: James H. Brady; James H. Hawley
- Preceded by: Ezra A. Burrell
- Succeeded by: Herman H. Taylor

Personal details
- Born: Lewis Hobart Sweetser; January 13, 1868 San Francisco, California
- Died: June 9, 1944 (aged 76) Los Angeles, California
- Party: Republican
- Spouse(s): Clara Hawkins (1902–1930s; her death)
- Education: University of California; Yale University
- Profession: Farmer

Lewis Hobart Sweetser (January 13, 1868 – June 9, 1944) was a Republican politician from Idaho. Born in San Francisco, he attended the University of California, Class of 1889, where he was a member of Chi Phi fraternity, and Yale University. Sweetser served as the 11th lieutenant governor of Idaho from 1909 to 1913 during the administrations of Governors James H. Brady and James H. Hawley. He lived in Burley, Idaho.

Sweetser also served in the Idaho Legislature. He was a member of the Idaho State House of Representatives from 1901 to 1902 and from 1905 to 1906. He died in Los Angeles in 1944.

He was partner with George and Harry Burroughs, brothers of Edgar Rice Burroughs, in a cattle ranch named the "Bar Y" in the valley of the Raft River, a post office there named Yale, and later in 1893 the Sweetser-Burroughs Mining Company that dredge mined the Snake River for gold. Their second dredging boat, their first being the Argus, was called the Yale. Sweetser and the Burroughs Brothers had been contemporaries at Yale University, and the "Bar Y", the boat, and the post office were named after it.

Political offices
Preceded by Ezra A. Burrell	Lieutenant Governor of Idaho; January 4, 1909–January 6, 1913	Succeeded by Herman H. Taylor
