= Ezra A. Burrell =

American politician

E. A. Burrell

10th Lieutenant Governor of Idaho
- In office January 7, 1907 – January 4, 1909
- Governor: Frank R. Gooding
- Preceded by: Burpee L. Steeves
- Succeeded by: Lewis H. Sweetser

Personal details
- Born: November 3, 1867; Carmi, Illinois, U.S.
- Died: June 5, 1930 (aged 62) Los Angeles, California, U.S.
- Party: Republican
- Spouse: Edith F. Speck (m. 1902)
- Children: Emelie Knodell (1904)

Ezra A. Burrell (November 3, 1867 – June 5, 1930) was a Republican politician from Idaho. He served as the tenth lieutenant governor of Idaho from 1907 to 1909 during the administration of Governor Frank R. Gooding. He was a native of Illinois. Burrell died in 1930 and is buried at Forest Lawn Memorial Park in Los Angeles, California, where he moved in 1918.

Political offices
Preceded by Burpee L. Steeves	Lieutenant Governor of Idaho; January 7, 1907–January 4, 1909	Succeeded by Lewis H. Sweetser
