= Kirtland I. Perky =

American politician

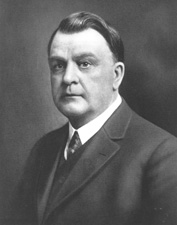

United States Senator from Idaho
- In office November 18, 1912 – February 5, 1913
- Appointed by: James H. Hawley
- Preceded by: Weldon B. Heyburn
- Succeeded by: James H. Brady

Personal details
- Born: February 8, 1867 Smithville, Ohio, U.S.
- Died: January 9, 1939 (aged 71) Los Angeles, California, U.S.
- Party: Democratic
- Education: Ohio Northern University (BA); University of Iowa (JD)

Kirtland Irving Perky (February 8, 1867 – January 9, 1939) was an American attorney and politician who served as a United States senator from Idaho.

== Early life and education ==
Born in Smithville, Ohio, he attended the public schools and graduated from Ohio Northern University in Ada in 1888. He studied law at the University of Iowa College of Law in Iowa City, and was admitted to the bar in 1890, commencing practice in Wahoo, Nebraska.

== Career ==
At age 27, Perky moved west in 1894 to Albion, Idaho, and was district judge of the fourth judicial district of Idaho in 1901. He moved to Boise and continued the practice of law.

Following the death of Weldon B. Heyburn in 1912, Perky was appointed to the vacant U.S. Senate seat by Governor James H. Hawley. A Democrat, he served less than three months, from November 18, 1912, to February 5, 1913, when a successor was elected, James H. Brady.

Perky resumed the practice of law in Boise, and moved to California in 1923, and continued the practice of law in Los Angeles.

== Personal life ==
Perky died at age 71 in 1939 at Good Samaritan Hospital. He was buried in Forest Lawn Cemetery in Glendale.

U.S. Senate
Preceded by Weldon B. Heyburn	U.S. senator from Idaho; 1912–1913	Succeeded by James H. Brady
