= Frank W. Hunt =

American politician

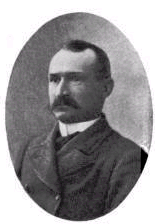

5th Governor of Idaho
- In office January 7, 1901 – January 5, 1903
- Lieutenant: Thomas F. Terrell
- Preceded by: Frank Steunenberg
- Succeeded by: John T. Morrison

Personal details
- Born: December 16, 1861 Newport, Kentucky, US
- Died: November 25, 1906 (aged 44) Boise, Idaho, US
- Party: Democratic
- Spouse: Ruth Maynard
- Profession: Mining, military

Frank Williams Hunt (December 16, 1861 – November 25, 1906) was the fifth governor of Idaho from 1901 until 1903.

== Biography ==
Hunt was educated in the common schools of Louisville, Kentucky. He moved to Idaho, pursued work as a miner, and was married to Ruth Maynard on November 10, 1896.

== Career ==
Elected to the Idaho State House of Representatives in 1892, Hunt held that position until 1894. Hunt served as a captain in the Idaho Regiment of Volunteers in the Philippines during the Spanish–American War (1898).

Elected governor in 1900 at the age of 38 Hunt remains the youngest governor in Idaho history. In March 1901 Hunt signed legislation creating the Academy of Idaho (now Idaho State University) in Pocatello. Hunt also ended the state of martial law in northern Idaho enacted by his predecessor, Frank Steunenberg, in 1899 as a response to labor unrest.

Hunt was defeated for reelection in 1902 by Republican John T. Morrison. After leaving office he became vice president and general manager of Dewey Combination Lease Company.

== Death ==
Late in 1906 Hunt contracted pneumonia in Goldfield, Nevada and died on November 25, in Boise, Idaho, at the age of 44. He is buried in the Boise Pioneer Cemetery (which has become known as "The Masonic Cemetery"). The Gem County Museum in Emmett includes an exhibit of his belongings.

Party political offices
Preceded by Frank Steunenberg	Democratic Party nominee, Governor of Idaho; 1900, 1902	Succeeded by Henry Heitfeld
