= John F. Nugent =

American politician

John Nugent
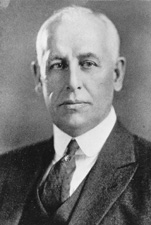

Commissioner of the Federal Trade Commission
- In office 1921–1927
- President: Woodrow Wilson; Warren G Harding; Calvin Coolidge

United States Senator from Idaho
- In office January 22, 1918 – January 14, 1921
- Preceded by: James Brady
- Succeeded by: Frank Gooding

Personal details
- Born: June 28, 1868 La Grande, Oregon, U.S.
- Died: September 18, 1931 (aged 63) Silver Spring, Maryland, U.S.
- Resting place: Cedar Hill Cemetery; Suitland, Maryland
- Party: Democratic
- Spouse(s): Adelma Ainslie Nugent (1870–1943)
- Children: 1

John Frost Nugent (June 28, 1868 – September 18, 1931) was an American attorney and Democratic politician from Idaho. He served three years in the United States Senate, from 1918 to 1921.

== Early life and education ==
Born in La Grande, Oregon, while his parents were visiting, Nugent attended public schools in Silver City, Idaho, where his father, Edward, was a judge.

== Career ==
He worked in mines in Idaho and Australia, and read law. Nugent was admitted to the bar in 1898, commencing practice back in Silver City, and was prosecuting attorney of Owyhee County from 1899 to 1906.

Following the murder of former governor Frank Steunenberg in late 1905, Nugent joined Clarence Darrow in defending three members of the Western Federation of Miners: Charles Moyer, president of the union, Bill Haywood, its secretary, and George Pettibone, a former member. All three were acquitted, while prime suspect Harry Orchard was convicted and died at the state penitentiary in 1954.

In January 1918, Governor Moses Alexander appointed Nugent to the U.S. Senate to succeed Republican James Brady, who died in office. Nugent defeated former Governor Frank Gooding by 970 votes in a special election that November to finish the term. In the Senate, Nugent served as chairman of the Committee on Fisheries.

Nugent faced Gooding again in 1920 for a full six-year term, but was defeated. Nugent resigned in January, prior to the end of his term in March, to accept an appointment from lame duck President Woodrow Wilson to the Federal Trade Commission. He served until 1927.

Nugent ran a third time for Senate in 1926, but finished third behind Gooding and Progressive candidate H. F. Samuels. He resumed the practice of law in Washington, D.C., and remained in the area until his death after a brief illness in 1931 at age 63.

== Personal life ==
Nugent, his wife Adelma (1870–1943), and their son George (1896–1979) are buried in Cedar Hill Cemetery in Suitland, Maryland.

Party political offices
Preceded by James H. Hawley	Democratic Party nominee, U.S. Senator (Class 3) from Idaho; 1918 special (won), 1920 (lost), 1926 (lost)	Succeeded by Chase A. Clark
U.S. Senate
Preceded by James H. Brady	U.S. senator (Class 3) from Idaho; January 22, 1918–January 14, 1921; Served alongside: William E. Borah	Succeeded by Frank R. Gooding
