= 1910 Idaho gubernatorial election =

- November 8, 1910
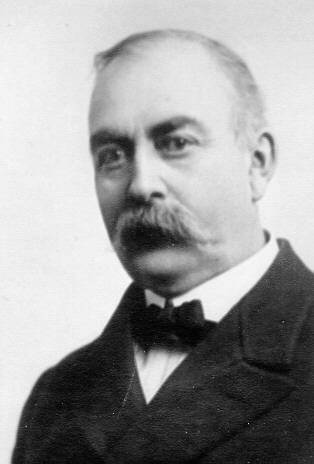

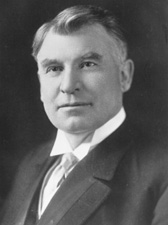

Nominee	James H. Hawley	James H. Brady	S. W. Motley
Party	Democratic	Republican	Socialist
Popular vote	40,856	39,961	5,342
Percentage	47.42%	46.38%	6.20%
- County results Hawley: 40–50% 50–60% 60–70% Brady: 40–50% 50–60% 60–70%
Governor before election
James H. Brady
Republican
Elected Governor
James H. Hawley
Democratic

The 1910 Idaho gubernatorial election was held on November 8, 1910. Democratic nominee James H. Hawley defeated incumbent Republican James H. Brady with 47.42% of the vote.

== General election ==
=== Candidates ===
Major party candidates

- James H. Hawley, Democratic
- James H. Brady, Republican

Other candidates

- S. W. Motley, Socialist

=== Results ===
1910 Idaho gubernatorial election
Party	Candidate	Votes	%	±%
Democratic	James H. Hawley	40,856	47.42%	
Republican	James H. Brady (incumbent)	39,961	46.38%	
Socialist	S. W. Motley	5,342	6.20%	
Majority		895		
Turnout				
Democratic gain from Republican		Swing		
