= Weldon B. Heyburn =

American politician (1852–1912)

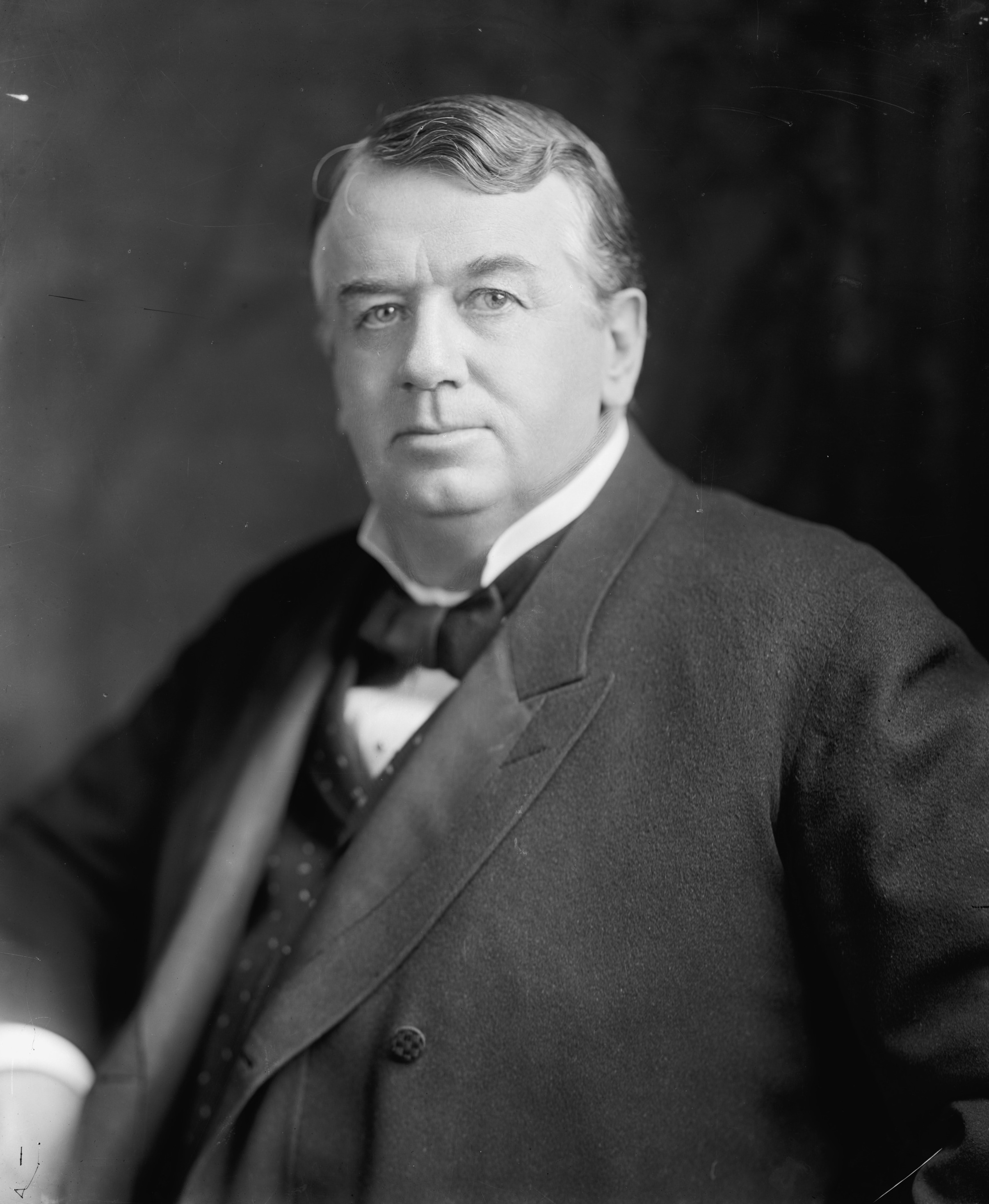
- Heyburn, c. 1905–1912

United States Senator from Idaho
- In office March 4, 1903 – October 17, 1912
- Preceded by: Henry Heitfeld
- Succeeded by: Kirtland Perky

Delegate to the Idaho Constitutional Convention
- In office July 4, 1889 – August 6, 1889
- Constituency: Shoshone County

Personal details
- Born: Weldon Brinton Heyburn; May 23, 1852 Chadds Ford Township, Pennsylvania, U.S.
- Died: October 17, 1912 (aged 60) Washington, D.C., U.S.
- Resting place: Birmingham-Lafayette Cemetery; Birmingham Township, Pennsylvania; 39°54′23″N 75°35′39.1″W
- Party: Republican
- Spouse(s): Gheretein Yeatman (1854–1934) (m. 1903–1912, his death)
- Parent(s): John Brinton Heyburn (1826–1874); Sarah Gilpin Heyburn (1830–1912)
- Education: University of Pennsylvania
- Profession: Attorney

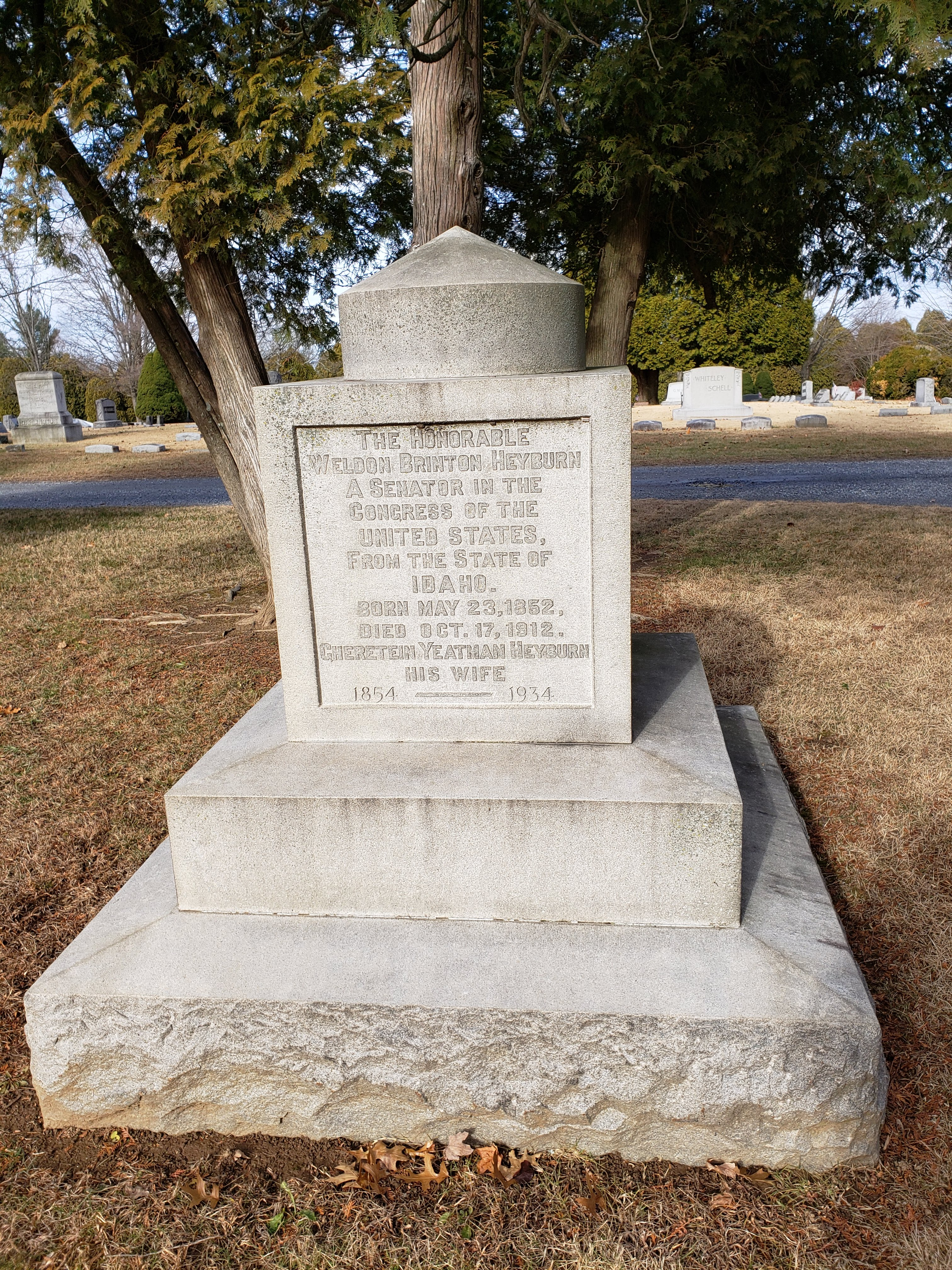
Weldon B. Heyburn grave at Birmingham-Lafayette Cemetery

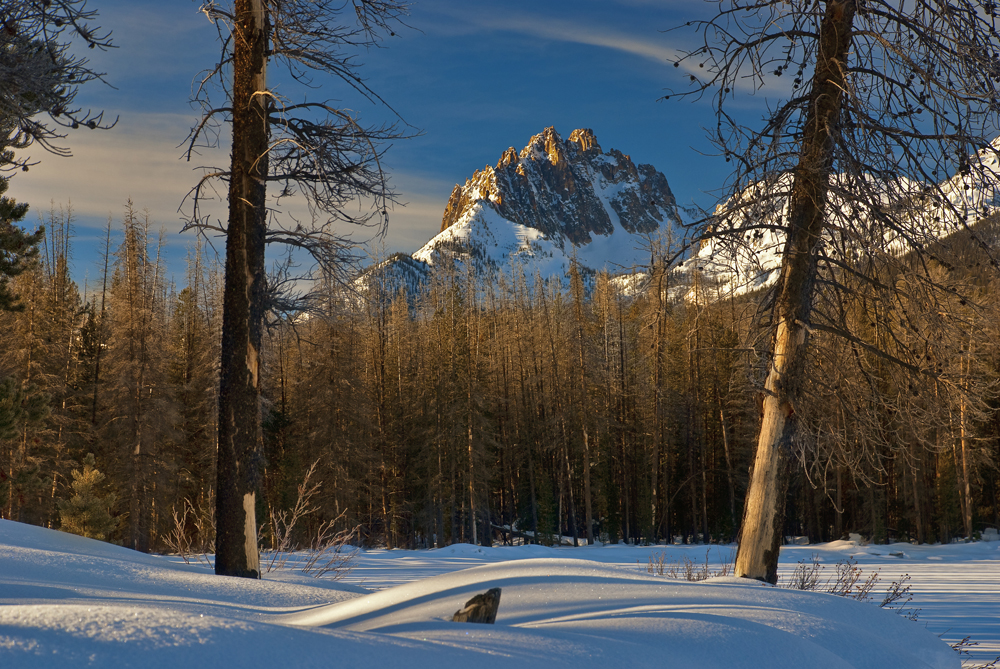
Mount Heyburn in central Idaho

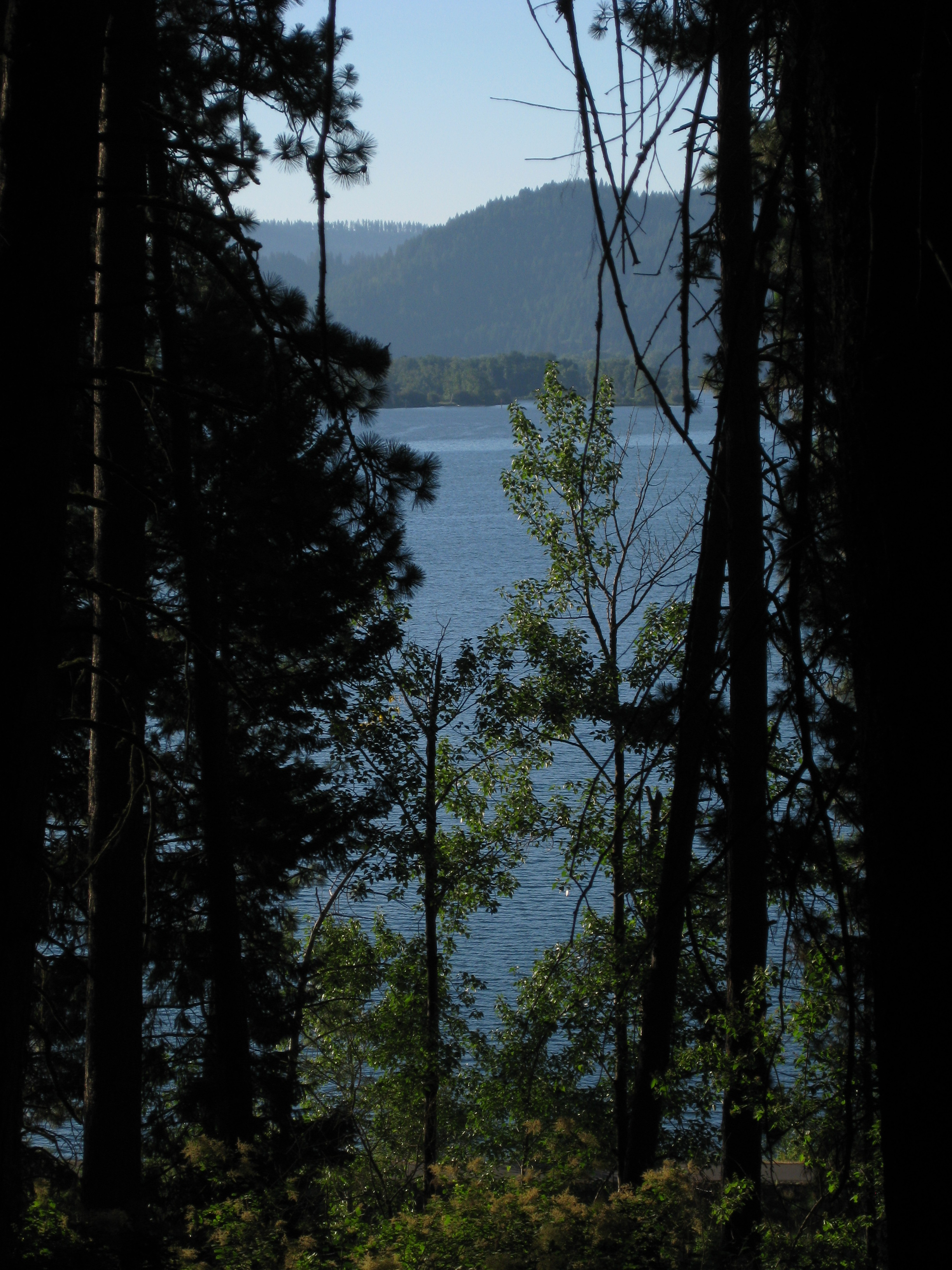
Heyburn State Park in northern Idaho

Weldon Brinton Heyburn (May 23, 1852 – October 17, 1912) was an American attorney and politician who served as a United States senator from Idaho from 1903 to 1912.

== Early life ==
Born in southeastern Pennsylvania near Chadds Ford, Pennsylvania, Heyburn's parents were Quakers of English descent. He attended the public schools there, including the Maplewood Institute in Concordville and the University of Pennsylvania. His brother, William Heyburn (1861–1939), eventually moved west to Louisville, Kentucky, where he became a leading citizen and president of Belknap Hardware and Manufacturing Company.

== Career ==
Heyburn studied law under Edward A. Price and was admitted to the bar in 1876 and commenced practice in Media, Pennsylvania,. With the mining boom in Colorado, he moved west to Leadville, where he practiced law for several years. In 1883, Heyburn moved to the Silver Valley of northern Idaho and continued the practice of law in Wallace in Shoshone County. Heyburn was a member of the Idaho Constitutional Convention in 1889.

=== Polaris Mine ===
On August 30, 1884, Heyburn staked the Polaris discovery, northeast of, and 26 days before, the Blake's discovery of the Yankee Boy and Yankee Girl ore bodies. After his death in 1912, a nephew mined some ore from the Polaris in a limited fashion. Hecla Mining took over the Polaris in 1930, while the Yankee Boy mine became the core of the Sunshine Mine in 1918.

=== Politics ===
Heyburn was an unsuccessful Republican candidate for election in 1898 to the 56th Congress, losing to Silver Republican Edgar Wilson. In January 1903, Heyburn was elected by the Idaho Legislature to the U.S. Senate, defeating Democrat James Hawley, 50 to 17. Boise attorney William Borah was the runner-up for the Republican nomination, 28 to 22, and won the other Senate seat four years later. Others in the race were former Governor and Senator George Shoup, and Judge D.W. Standrod; both dropped out and gave their support to Heyburn.

Heyburn was re-elected by the legislature January 1909, and was chairman of the Committee on Manufactures (58th through 62nd Congresses). During his career, he opposed Gifford Pinchot's call for national forests because he did not agree with the federal government controlling vast amounts of land in western states. He also fought President Theodore Roosevelt on many of the Progressive Era ideas, such as an 8-hour work day and child welfare laws.

The largest man in the Senate, Heyburn had collapsed on the Senate floor after delivering a speech in March 1912, and been in ill health for most of the year prior to his death at age 60 in Washington, D.C., on October 17. He was interred at Birmingham-Lafayette Cemetery in Birmingham Township, Pennsylvania.

=== Legacy ===
Heyburn is best remembered for introducing the bill which became the Pure Food and Drug Act in 1906.

In the state of Idaho, the city of Heyburn in Minidoka County is named for him, as well as Mount Heyburn, a jagged peak in the Sawtooth Mountains. The mountain tops out at 10,229 feet (3,118 m) above sea level, and overlooks Redfish Lake in the Sawtooth National Recreation Area, just south of Stanley in Custer County.

Heyburn State Park, the Northwest's oldest state park, is in Benewah County at the southern end of Lake Coeur d'Alene. It was created in 1908; Senator Heyburn had attempted to secure it as a national park. The legislature named it after Heyburn in 1911, while he was still in office.

== See also ==
- List of United States senators from Idaho
- List of members of the United States Congress who died in office (1900–1949)

U.S. Senate
Preceded by Henry Heitfeld	U.S. senator from Idaho; 1903–1912	Succeeded by Kirtland Perky
