= John T. Morrison =

American politician

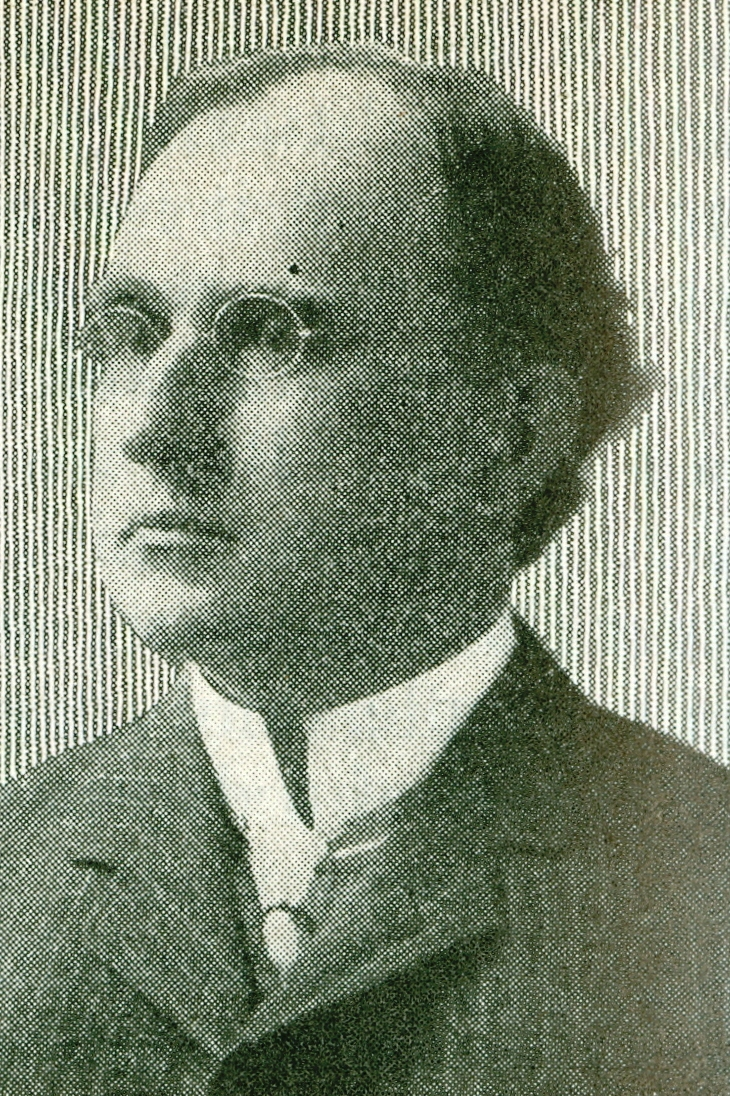

6th Governor of Idaho
- In office January 5, 1903 – January 2, 1905
- Lieutenant: James M. Stevens
- Preceded by: Frank W. Hunt
- Succeeded by: Frank R. Gooding

Personal details
- Born: December 25, 1860 Jefferson County, Pennsylvania, US
- Died: December 20, 1915 (aged 54) Boise, Idaho, US
- Party: Republican
- Spouse: Grace Darling Mackey
- Education: Wooster University; Cornell Law School
- Profession: Attorney

John Tracy Morrison (December 25, 1860 – December 20, 1915) was the sixth governor of Idaho from 1903 until 1905.

== Biography ==
Morrison was born in Jefferson County, Pennsylvania. He was married to Grace Darling Mackey in 1886. He graduated from Wooster University in 1887. He graduated from Cornell Law School in 1890 and moved to Caldwell, where he became a successful attorney and an active member of the local Presbyterian Church. He served as commissioner to the national assembly of his church five times.

== Career ==
In 1891, Morrison was influential in founding the College of Idaho and served as an original faculty member, teaching English and history. In 1893 he became a member of the school's board of trustees. He served on the board of trustees until 1904.

An unsuccessful candidate for state legislature in 1896, Morrison was Chairman of the Republican State Central Committee from 1897 to 1900.

Idaho Republicans nominated Morrison as their gubernatorial candidate in 1902. He was elected by defeating the Democratic incumbent, Frank W. Hunt. During his term in office, state examinations of weights and measures were initiated, a pure food law was enacted, and a reform school at St. Anthony was founded.

Morrison sought reelection in 1904, but Republicans declined to nominate him for a second term, instead supporting Frank R. Gooding. Upon leaving office on January 2, 1905, he returned Caldwell, and resumed his law practice.

== Death ==
Morrison died December 20, 1915, and is interred at the Morris Hill Cemetery, Boise, Ada County, Idaho US.

Party political offices
Preceded by D. W. Standrod	Republican nominee for Governor of Idaho; 1902	Succeeded by Frank R. Gooding
