= Frank R. Gooding =

American politician (1859–1928)

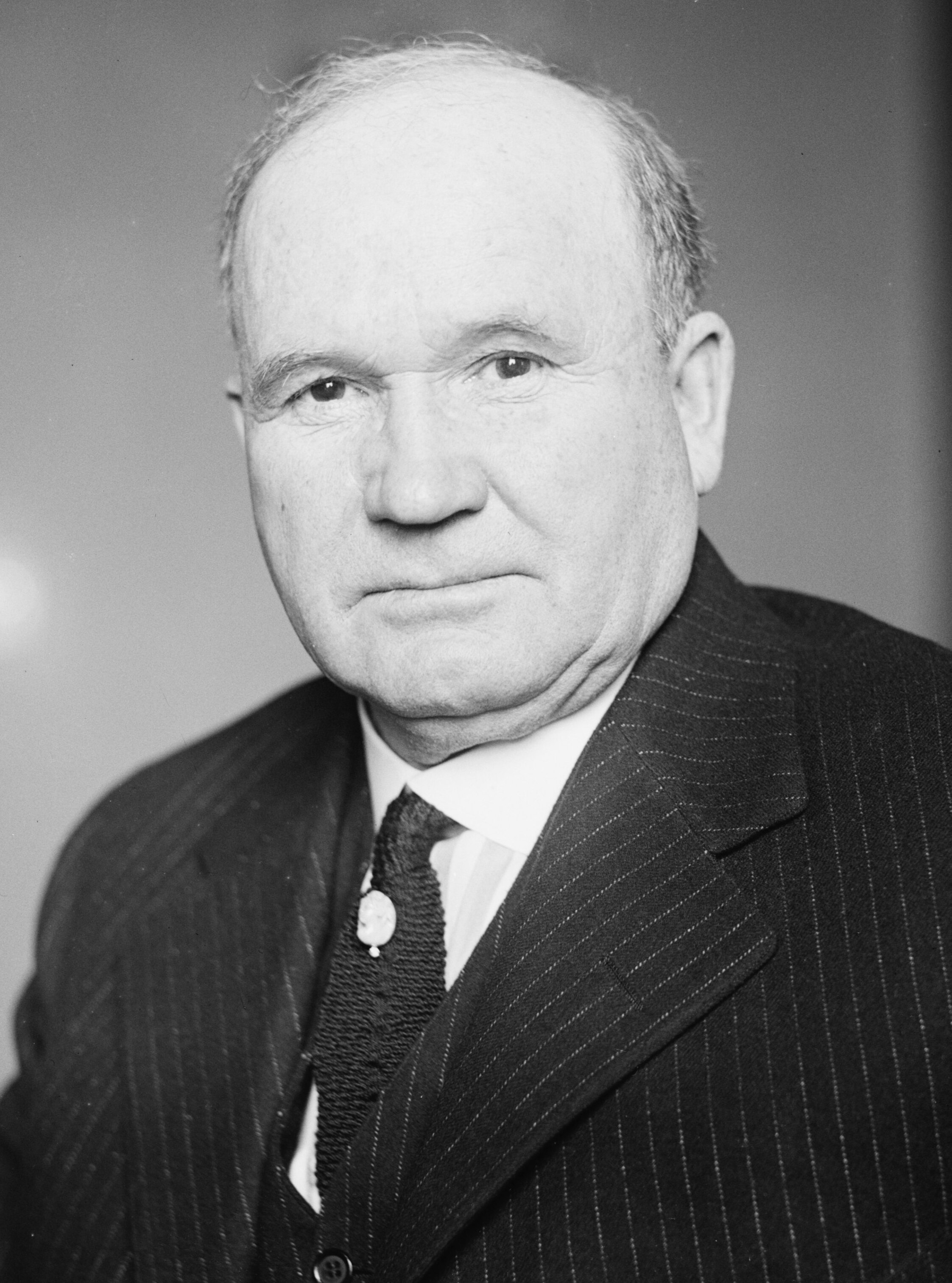
- Gooding in 1921

United States Senator from Idaho
- In office January 15, 1921 – June 24, 1928
- Preceded by: John F. Nugent
- Succeeded by: John Thomas

7th Governor of Idaho
- In office January 2, 1905 – January 4, 1909
- Lieutenant: Burpee L. Steeves; Ezra A. Burrell
- Preceded by: John T. Morrison
- Succeeded by: James H. Brady

Personal details
- Born: Frank Robert Gooding; September 16, 1859 Tiverton, Devon, England
- Died: June 24, 1928 (aged 68) Gooding, Idaho, United States
- Resting place: Elmwood Cemetery (Gooding, Idaho)
- Party: Republican
- Spouse: Amanda Thomas
- Children: 3
- Profession: Agriculture

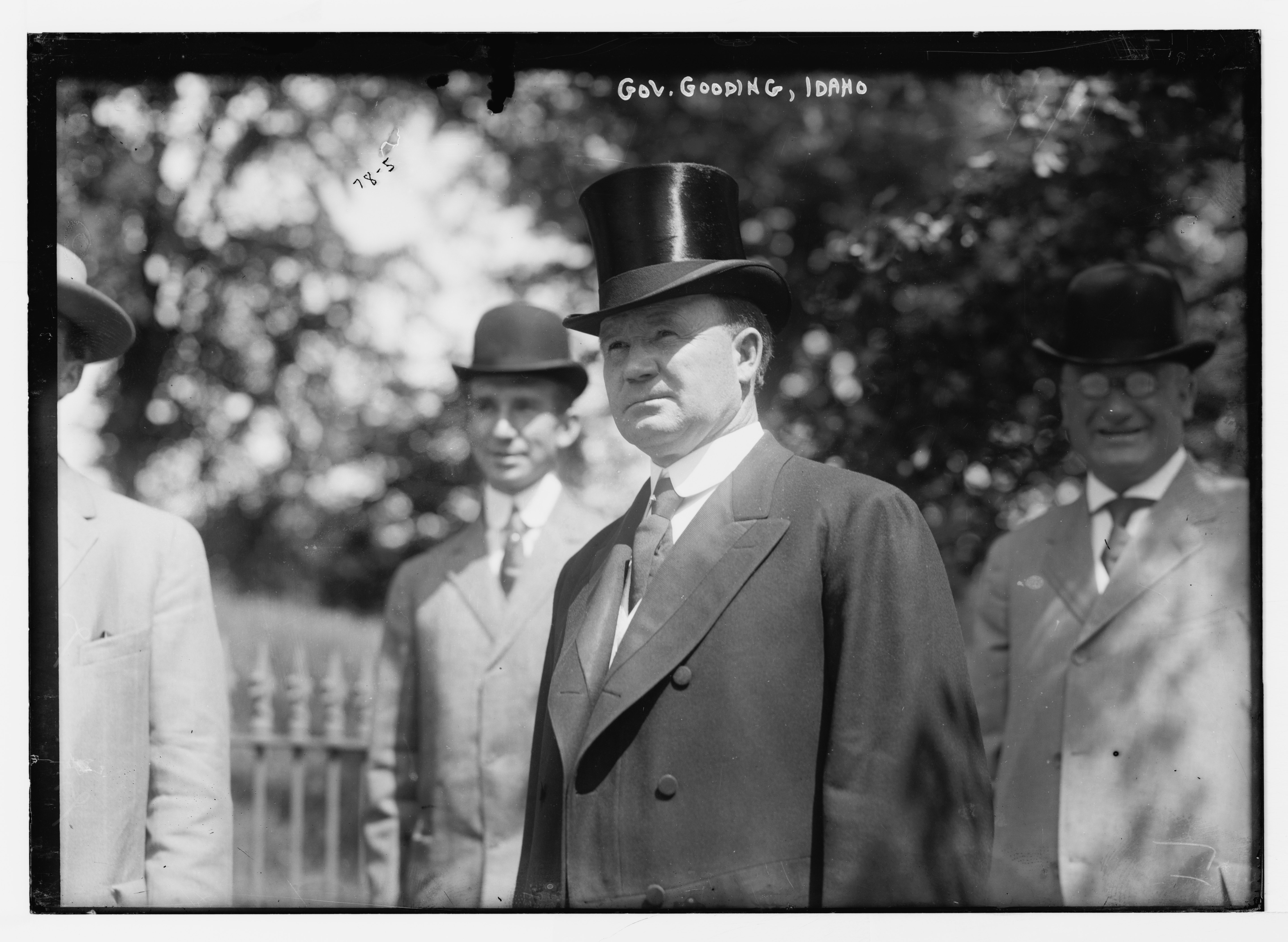
Gooding c. 1908

Frank Robert Gooding (September 16, 1859 – June 24, 1928) was a Republican United States senator and the seventh governor of Idaho. The city of Gooding and Gooding County, both in southern Idaho, are named for him.

== Life and career ==
Born in the county of Devon, England, Gooding emigrated to the United States as a child with his family in 1867. The family settled on a farm in Michigan near Paw Paw. He attended the common schools there, and moved to Mount Shasta, California, in 1877, and engaged in farming and mining. Gooding moved to the Idaho Territory in 1881 and was one of the largest sheep owners in Idaho. He settled in Ketchum (adjacent to Sun Valley since 1936), where he worked as a mail carrier and subsequently engaged in the firewood and charcoal business. In 1888, he moved south and settled near present-day Gooding.

After Idaho became a state in 1890, Gooding emerged as a leader of the conservative faction of the Idaho Republican Party. Gooding was a powerful figure in Idaho in the early 20th century, as the city and county of Gooding were both named for him during his lifetime.

Gooding was named chairman of the Idaho Lincoln County Republicans in 1896. Gooding was state chairman of the Idaho Republican Party from 1900-1904. He was elected to the Idaho Legislature in 1898, and elected Governor of Idaho in 1904, before he became a U.S. citizen.

Gooding had a reputation for having an off-putting and abrasive personality, and often clashed with others in the Republican Party, notably progressive Senator William Borah.

=== Governor ===
From 1905 to 1909, Gooding served two 2-year terms as Governor of Idaho. During his administration the Idaho State Capitol building in Boise was constructed.

==== The Steunenberg assassination ====
Gooding came to national attention during the trial phase of the conspiracy prosecution of three leaders of the Western Federation of Miners (WFM), charged with the assassination of former Idaho Governor Frank Steunenberg. In 1899, Steunenberg had crushed a rebellion of miners during a labor dispute in Coeur d'Alene. Nearly five years out of office, Steunenberg was murdered by a bomb outside his Caldwell home in December 1905, and Harry Orchard was arrested for the crime.

Idaho's Chief Justice Stockslager drafted a telegram which invited the Pinkerton Agency to investigate. Governor Gooding was persuaded to approve the request, and Pinkerton agent James McParland soon arrived to lead the investigation. McParland announced his suspicion that Orchard was "the tool of others."

McParland's first order was to have Orchard transferred from the relatively comfortable Caldwell jail to death row in the Boise penitentiary, before any trial had occurred. The move was initially resisted by Judge Smith, who would be responsible for trying the case. The local judge anticipated a successful habeas corpus lawsuit against the tactic. McParland gave him "thirty precedents for the move." However, the sheriff in Caldwell also opposed the move.

Governor Gooding arranged a meeting between McParland and Chief Justice Stockslager, and then with Judge Smith. Before Smith arrived, McParland declared the county jail insecure, a potential target for dynamite. He also stated the purpose of the move to death row: "After three days I will attempt to get a confession." Chief Justice Stockslager approved of the move. In a pre-arranged plan, the Governor was called out of the room as soon as Judge Smith arrived, leaving McParland and the two judges alone. With the Chief Justice supporting the move to death row, Judge Smith also agreed.

McParland later threatened Orchard with immediate hanging, and said that he could avoid that fate only if he testified against leaders of the WFM. Orchard confessed, and was transferred from death row to a private bungalow in the prison yard. Governor Gooding stopped by to shake his hand and congratulate him on cooperating.

McParland then had WFM leaders Bill Haywood, Charles Moyer, and George Pettibone arrested in Colorado, using extradition papers which falsely claimed that the three men had been present at Steunenberg's murder.

The investigation and trial were financed with "deficiency certificates." In his book Big Trouble, J. Anthony Lukas recorded that with the use of these certificates,

In effect, the bank acted as a mere conduit for the passage of money from the mining industry to the state for use in the Haywood prosecution.

Thousands of dollars were also provided directly from the mine owners to the prosecuting attorneys in the case. Thus, mine owners were deliberately financing the state's prosecution of leaders of the union which had been organizing their mines. Upon hearing of this circumstance, President Theodore Roosevelt issued a particularly stern rebuke to Governor Gooding, describing such a state of affairs as the "grossest impropriety." President Roosevelt wrote:

[Idaho's government would] make a fatal mistake—and when I say fatal I mean literally that—if it permits itself to be identified with the operators any more than with the miners... If the Governor or the other officials of Idaho accept a cent from the operators or from any other capitalist with any reference, direct or indirect, to this prosecution, they would forfeit the respect of every good citizen and I should personally feel that they had committed a real crime.

Governor Gooding's response to the President provided a "severely distorted" account of the financial arrangements for the trial, shifted the blame to others, and promised to return money contributed by the mine owners. Gooding then:

...kept the narrowest construction of his promise to the president... [He then proclaimed publicly and often that no] dollar has been or will be supplied from any private source or organization whatsoever, [and then] went right on taking money from the mine owners.

Pettibone, Haywood, and Moyer were found not guilty of conspiracy in the killing. Orchard was convicted and sentenced to death. His death sentence was commuted, and he spent the rest of his life at the state penitentiary, and died in 1954.

==== Idaho School for the Deaf and the Blind ====
The Idaho School for the Deaf and the Blind (ISDB) was first established in 1906 in Boise and operated there until it burned down on December 8, 1908. The Idaho Legislature passed an act on March 16, 1909 establishing a permanent state school. Governor Frank Gooding donated land for the ISDB so it was moved to Gooding and started accepting students in September 1910.

The grounds and some of the dormitories at the ISDB.The school covers a 40-acre (16 ha) area and provides dormitories for many of its students and has other facilities, such as a gymnasium and park.

=== Senate ===
In 1918, Gooding was the Republican nominee in a special U.S. Senate election to complete the term of James H. Brady, who died in office early in the year. Gooding was defeated by the appointed incumbent, Democrat John Nugent, by 970 votes.

In 1920, Gooding defeated Nugent for a full six-year term in the Senate. He took office in mid-January 1921, seven weeks early, as Nugent resigned to accept a late-term appointment by outgoing President Woodrow Wilson to the Federal Trade Commission (FTC).

Gooding was reelected in 1926, again defeating Nugent. He died in office in 1928, and was succeeded by a political protégé, John Thomas, appointed by Governor H. C. Baldridge.

==== Mountain Time Zone ====
In the 1920s, the Interstate Commerce Commission (ICC) had the western two-thirds of Idaho in the Pacific Time Zone. Gooding sponsored a bill in the Senate to place all of southern Idaho in the Mountain Time Zone, which stands today. The dividing line is the Salmon River at about 45.5° N, approximately midway from the borders with Nevada (42° N) and British Columbia, Canada (49° N).

=== Election results ===
U.S. Senate elections in Idaho (Class III): Results 1918–1926
Year	Democrat	Votes	Pct	Republican	Votes	Pct	3rd Party	Party	Votes	Pct
1918	John Nugent (inc.)	48,467	50.5%	Frank Gooding	47,497	49.5%				
1920	John Nugent (inc.)	64,513	45.9%	Frank Gooding	75,985	54.1%				
1926	John Nugent	31,285	25.0%	Frank Gooding (inc.)	56,847	45.4%	H. F. Samuels	Progressive	37,047	29.6%

- 1918 was a special election (November) to complete the term, vacated by the death of James Brady on January 13.
  John Nugent was appointed by Governor Moses Alexander on January 22.

== Death ==
Gooding had been in ill health with cancer for several months in 1928 and was recuperating from surgery performed in May at the Mayo Clinic in Minnesota. He died at his daughter's home in Gooding on June 24 at age 68. Gooding and his wife Amanda are buried in Elmwood Cemetery in Gooding. In 1958, he was inducted into the Hall of Great Westerners of the National Cowboy & Western Heritage Museum.

== See also ==
- Frank Steunenberg, assassinated ex-governor of Idaho
- Harry Orchard, convicted assassin in the Steunenberg assassination
- James McParland, Pinkerton detective responsible for the investigation
- Bill Haywood, WFM union leader accused of conspiracy
- Coeur d'Alene, Idaho labor confrontation of 1899, alleged reason for the Steunenberg assassination
- List of United States senators born outside the United States
- List of members of the United States Congress who died in office (1900–1949)

Party political offices
Preceded by John T. Morrison	Republican Party nominee for Governor of Idaho; 1904 (won), 1906 (won)	Succeeded by James H. Brady
Preceded by James H. Brady	Republican Party nominee for U.S. Senator (Class 3) from Idaho; 1918 special (lost), 1920 (won), 1926 (won)	Succeeded by John Thomas
Political offices
Preceded by John T. Morrison	Governor of Idaho; January 2, 1905–January 4, 1909	Succeeded by James H. Brady
U.S. Senate
Preceded by John F. Nugent	U.S. senator (Class 3) from Idaho; January 15, 1921–June 24, 1928; Served alongside: William E. Borah	Succeeded by John Thomas
