= James H. Hawley =

American politician

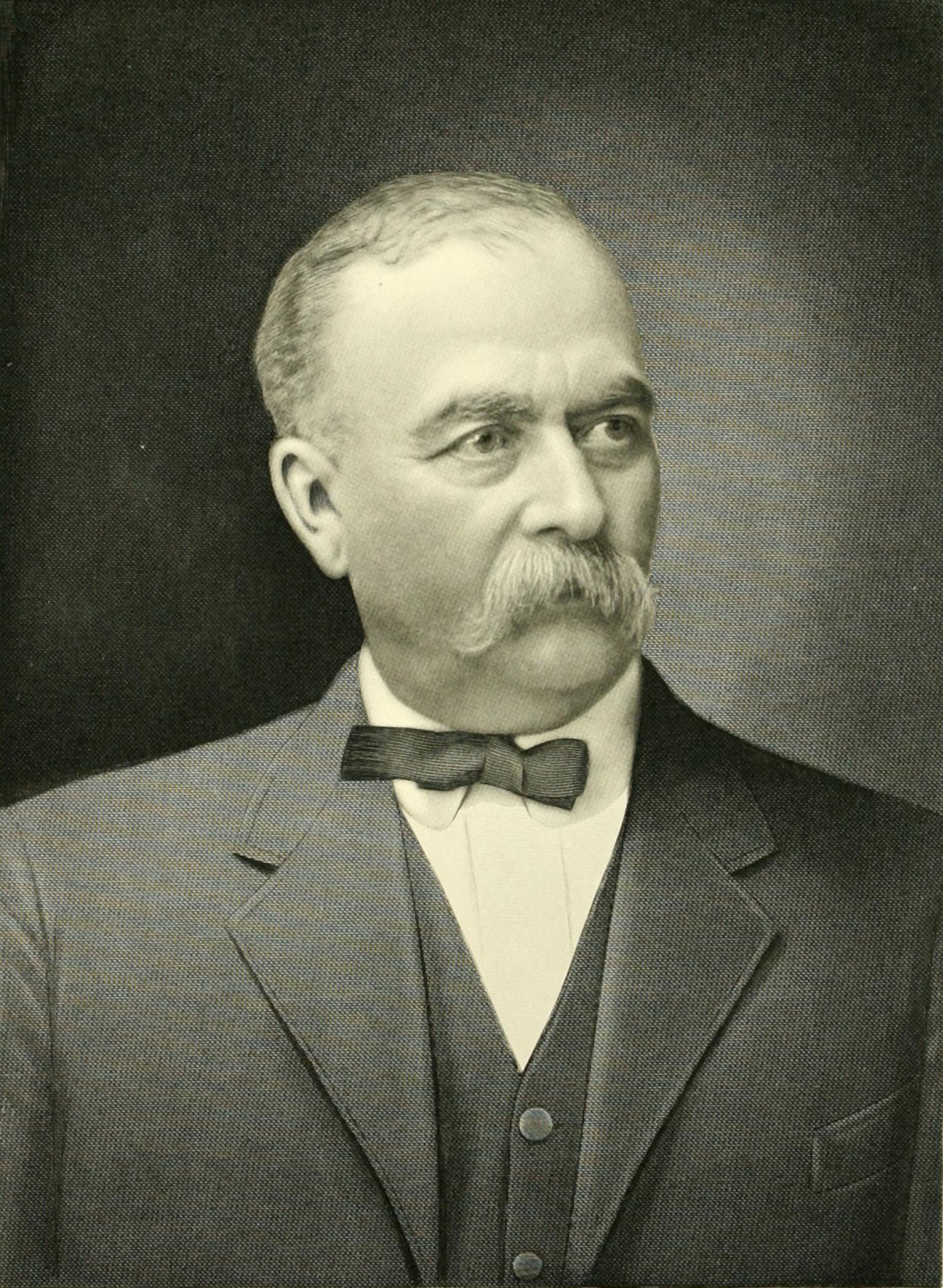

9th Governor of Idaho
- In office January 2, 1911 – January 6, 1913
- Lieutenant: Lewis H. Sweetser
- Preceded by: James H. Brady
- Succeeded by: John M. Haines

Mayor of Boise, Idaho
- In office July 18, 1903 – July 20, 1905
- Preceded by: Moses Alexander
- Succeeded by: James A. Pinney

Member of the Idaho Territorial Council
- In office 1874–1875
- Constituency: Boise County

Member of the Idaho Territorial House of Representatives
- In office 1870–1871
- Constituency: Boise County

Personal details
- Born: January 17, 1847 Dubuque, Iowa, US
- Died: August 3, 1929 (aged 82) Boise, Idaho, US
- Resting place: Morris Hill Cemetery, Boise, Idaho, US
- Party: Democratic
- Spouse(s): Mary E. Bullock (1855–1915)
- Children: 8, (6 to maturity)
- Profession: Attorney
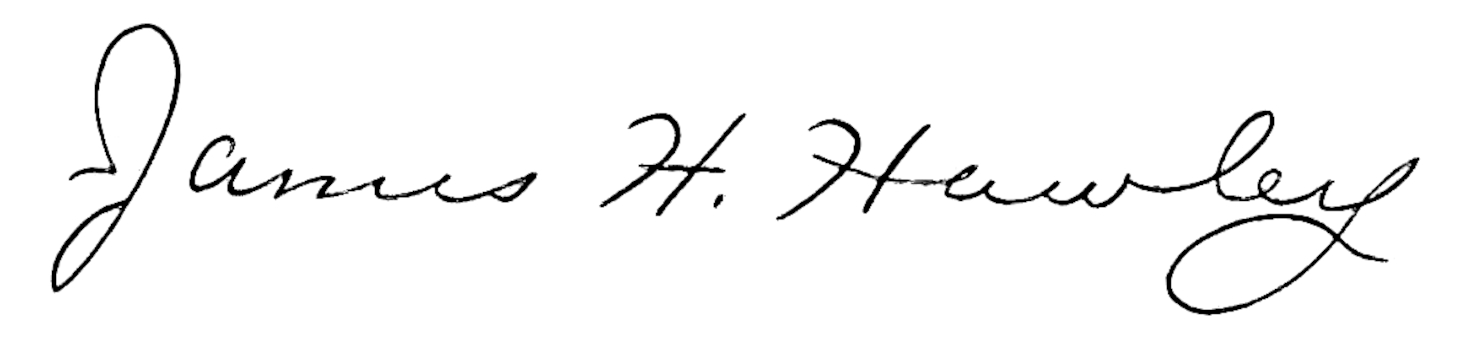
- Signature

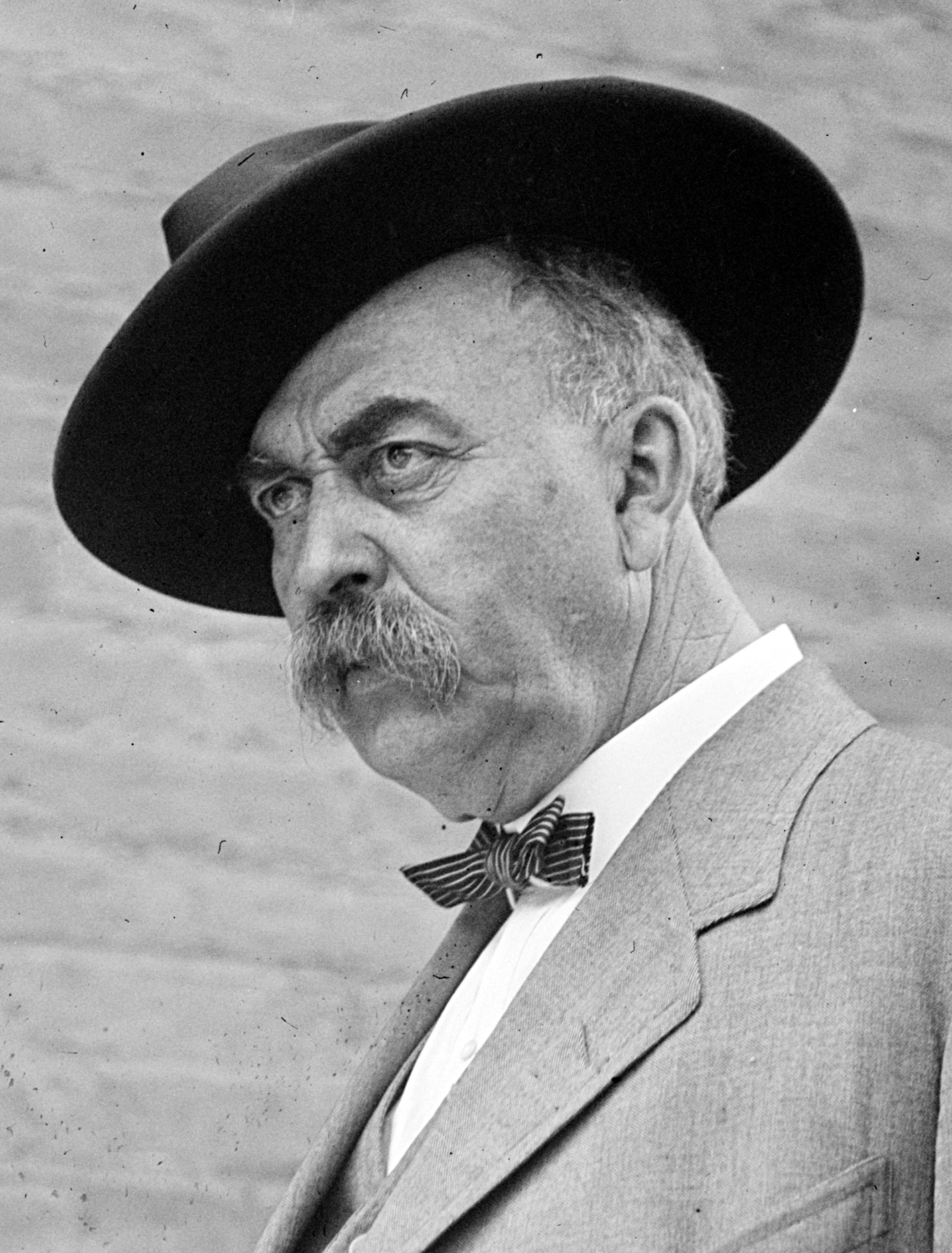
Hawley in the early 1910s.

James Henry Hawley (January 17, 1847 – August 3, 1929) was an American attorney and politician from Idaho. He was the state's ninth governor from 1911 to 1913, and the mayor of Boise from 1903 to 1905. He also acted as prosecutor or defense attorney for a substantial number of criminal cases. Outside of criminal law, he specialized in irrigation and mining cases.

== Early life ==
Born in Dubuque, Iowa, Hawley's mother died when he was an infant. Two years later, his father followed the gold rush to California, then moved to Texas in 1856. Thus, James grew up with the family of his uncle, James Carr.

James's maternal Carr ancestors included a great-grandfather who was a major during the Revolutionary War, and a grandfather who was a captain in the War of 1812. His father served as a major in a Texas regiment of the Confederate Army.

At the start of the Civil War, James tried to join the Union Army as part of an Iowa Volunteer regiment. Rejected as far too young at age fourteen, he gave up the idea when his uncle relocated to California in the early summer of 1861. Then his uncle headed for the newly discovered gold fields in northern Idaho. James was supposed to attend school in San Francisco, but instead he joined his uncle in Idaho, still a part of Washington Territory, during the spring of 1862.

Traveling from Lewiston, the two followed the rush into the Florence Basin. Through luck or an acute weather sense, they chose to leave the area for Walla Walla, Washington before the depth of winter set in. According to reports of the time, the 1861–1862 season "proved to be one of the coldest in the history of Idaho."

While they waited in Walla Walla, word spread of major new gold discoveries in the Boise Basin, a mountainous area around Idaho City, northeast of present-day Boise. Drawn by the new finds, they moved to the Basin in the spring of 1863. For several months, Hawley worked for wages at the Gold Hill Mine, near Quartzburg. With his savings from that, he bought a placer claim in the area and also searched for gold on other unclaimed land. During the winter of 1863–1864, he sold and distributed issues of the Boise News, the first newspaper published in southern Idaho.

Hawley returned to San Francisco to attend City College there in 1865. He also began to read law at an attorney's office. He apparently completed the coursework he wanted by the spring of 1867. However, he then ran into some difficulty in San Francisco, the details of which "have not been preserved." According to one account, he ran away to sea and ended up in China, on the losing side of the Taiping Rebellion. Supposedly, he escaped death after being captured by government forces through the good offices of the British consul. In any case, Hawley returned to the Boise Basin in 1868, and again took up mining and prospecting.

== Politics and law ==
Still determined to become a lawyer, Hawley continued to read law at a Boise County attorney's office. At the same time, he worked in gold fields all over central Idaho. In 1870, voters in Boise County elected him, as a Democrat, to the territorial house of representatives. He reportedly received "the largest majority given any one on the ticket."

During that term in office, he was appointed chairman of the house judiciary committee. Also, in February 1871, Hawley was admitted to the bar, with the right to argue cases all the way up to the territorial supreme court. In 1874, he was elected to the Territorial Council. Two years later he began a term as chief clerk of the council while also serving as a Commissioner in Boise County. In 1878, he was elected district attorney for the second judicial district of the territory. That district encompassed an area stretching generally from Mountain Home to the Montana border, north of Salmon.

Hawley had settled in Quartzburg upon his marriage there in 1875. After he became District Attorney, they moved to Idaho City, the county seat of Boise County. He was elected to another term as District Attorney, and ran unsuccessfully for Territorial Delegate to Congress. Around 1884, he moved to Hailey and practiced law there for two years. In 1885, President Cleveland appointed him United States Attorney for Idaho Territory.

Although Hawley retained mining investments in the Boise Basin as well as around Hailey, after about 1886 he began handling more legal business in Boise. He finally moved his family and established a permanent residence there in 1890.

Record-keeping in early Idaho Territory was rather hit-or-miss, but it is generally agreed that Hawley served as prosecutor or defense attorney for hundreds of criminal trials during his legal career. Certainly by the time he moved to Boise, his expertise in such matters was in great demand.

Hawley played a strong leadership role in Democratic Party politics, including six years as Committee Chair in Boise County. The Illustrated History, published in 1899, said, "He has been a member of every Democratic state convention since his arrival in Idaho with the exception of that of 1896."

He was elected mayor of Boise in 1902, despite a heavily Republican electorate in the city. Although he received high marks for his administration of city government, he chose not to run again and served a single two-year term. He was elected Governor in 1910, but was defeated during his re-election bid in 1912. Later, he made at least two runs for Idaho's U.S. Senate seat, but never attained that office.

== Key legal cases ==
Although no specific court cases are mentioned in extant records, Hawley became involved in labor disputes during his terms as district attorney of Boise County. He acted as a mediator in a dispute between striking miners and owners near Hailey. The miners threatened a violent takeover of the properties, but finally agreed to a peaceful resolution.

During his term as U.S. Attorney for Idaho Territory, Hawley prosecuted a number of cases against Mormons under the anti-polygamy Edmunds Act. Although he disapproved of the Act on legal grounds, Hawley "prosecuted the cases vigorously … leaving the punishments to the court." His "large circle of close personal friends" in the Mormon community respected his adherence to duty. Most apparently did not hold his many successful convictions against him, personally.

Hawley again became involved with labor unrest in 1892, two years after statehood. An increase in railroad freight charges squeezed profits in the lead-silver mines in the Coeur d'Alene mining region. The owners responded by introducing more mechanization, reclassified workers to cut their pay, and increased working hours. The resulting strike escalated to violence. After the governor declared martial law, hundreds of miners were swept into a makeshift prison, referred to as the "bullpen." Many were then charged with whatever "crimes" – violating injunctions, etc. – prosecutors could dream up. Hawley served on the defense team that eventually secured the release of every miner accused during this process.

Five years later, Hawley began a long involvement with a case that drew considerable attention in southern Idaho. Cattleman John Sparks, later governor of Nevada, hired him to defend two of his cowboys accused of murdering two sheep herders. One cowboy, Jackson Lee "Diamondfield Jack" Davis, had a notorious reputation as a gunman, and had earlier shot and wounded another sheepman. Despite a deeply flawed case, with much mishandling of evidence by authorities, Davis was convicted and sentenced to hang. With virtually the same physical evidence, such as it was, the other cowboy was declared not guilty. Before the hanging, two other cattlemen confessed to the "self-defense" shooting of the sheepmen. Because of structural flaws in Idaho's legal system at the time, Hawley never could secure a "not guilty" verdict for his client. However, he kept after it. Finally, in December 1902, shortly after Hawley was elected mayor of Boise, Davis was pardoned and released from prison.

Besides that long effort, in 1899 Hawley acted, along with attorney William Borah as state prosecutor after a re-occurrence of labor violence in the Coeur d'Alene mines of the Silver Valley. (Ironically, Borah was Hawley's most vehement opponent in the Diamondfield Jack case.) During one clash, much mine property was blown up, and strikers shot and killed a non-union miner. Most of the attackers wore masks, so no one specific could be brought to trial for the murder and destruction. Hoping to prevent future violence, the state made an example of Paul Corcoran, a union Secretary. He was convicted as an accessory to various felonies and sentenced to a long prison sentence. When no further union violence ensued, authorities quietly pardoned and released him in 1901.

According to fellow attorney and biographer John McClane, Hawley was "entirely sympathetic" to the drive for workers to unionize ... as long as the unions stayed within the law. His final confrontation came in another case of union violence outside the law. On December 30, 1905, a bomb at his front gate assassinated Idaho's ex-Governor, Frank Steunenberg, who had gained the enmity of the union when he sent troops in to enforce martial law during the 1899 violence. A man using the alias Harry Orchard soon confessed to placing the bomb, saying he had been paid to do so by union officials.

With Orchard as their star witness, the State tried to make an example of three unions leaders who had supposedly orchestrated the murder. Hawley again teamed up with Borah to prosecute the State's conspiracy cases. Their first case, in 1907, proceeded against "Big Bill" Haywood, General Secretary of the Western Federation of Miners (WFM). Haywood's defense team, which included the renowned Clarence Darrow, found enough holes in the State's evidence to secure a "not guilty" verdict. After the second leader received a "not guilty" verdict, charges against the third were dropped.

Although the State failed, at great expense, to gain a conviction, Hawley always felt the trials had been "worth the effort that had been made." In elections soon after Haywood's acquittal, the more radical leaders of the WFM were turned out of office. After that, according to Hawley, the unions "have, as a general thing, been under the management of law-abiding men." The assassin, Harry Orchard, pleaded guilty in March 1908 and was sentenced to hang, but it was commuted to life imprisonment; Orchard died at the state penitentiary in 1954 at age 88.

== Later life ==
The WFM acquittals did not hurt Hawley's reputation. He still carried on a lucrative law practice and, as noted above, was elected governor. (Nor did Borah suffer.) Hawley retired from politics at age 70, after his second failed bid at a U.S. Senate seat.

In 1915, Hawley was appointed to the board of directors for the Idaho State Historical Society. In a subsequent vote by the board, he was elected President of the Society. Five years later, the four-volume History of Idaho was published, with Hawley as its Editor. Hawley remained a strong advocate for the Historical Society throughout his tenure. In his letter of transmittal for the required 1923–1924 biennial report, Hawley pleaded that the Librarian and her Assistant "should be given a salary commensurate with the importance of their positions and the character of their duties."

He was still president, and still asking for better funding, when he died of a heart attack at age 82 in Boise on August 3, 1929.

Political offices
Preceded by Moses Alexander	Mayor of Boise, Idaho; 1903–1905	Succeeded by James A. Pinney
Preceded by James H. Brady	Governor of Idaho; January 2, 1911 – January 6, 1913	Succeeded by John M. Haines
Party political offices
Preceded by Moses Alexander	Democratic Party nominee, Governor of Idaho; 1910, 1912	Succeeded by Moses Alexander
Preceded by Pre-17th Amendment	Democratic Party nominee, U.S. Senator (Class 3) from Idaho; 1914 (lost)	Succeeded by John F. Nugent
