= 1944 United States Senate election in Idaho =

- November 7, 1944
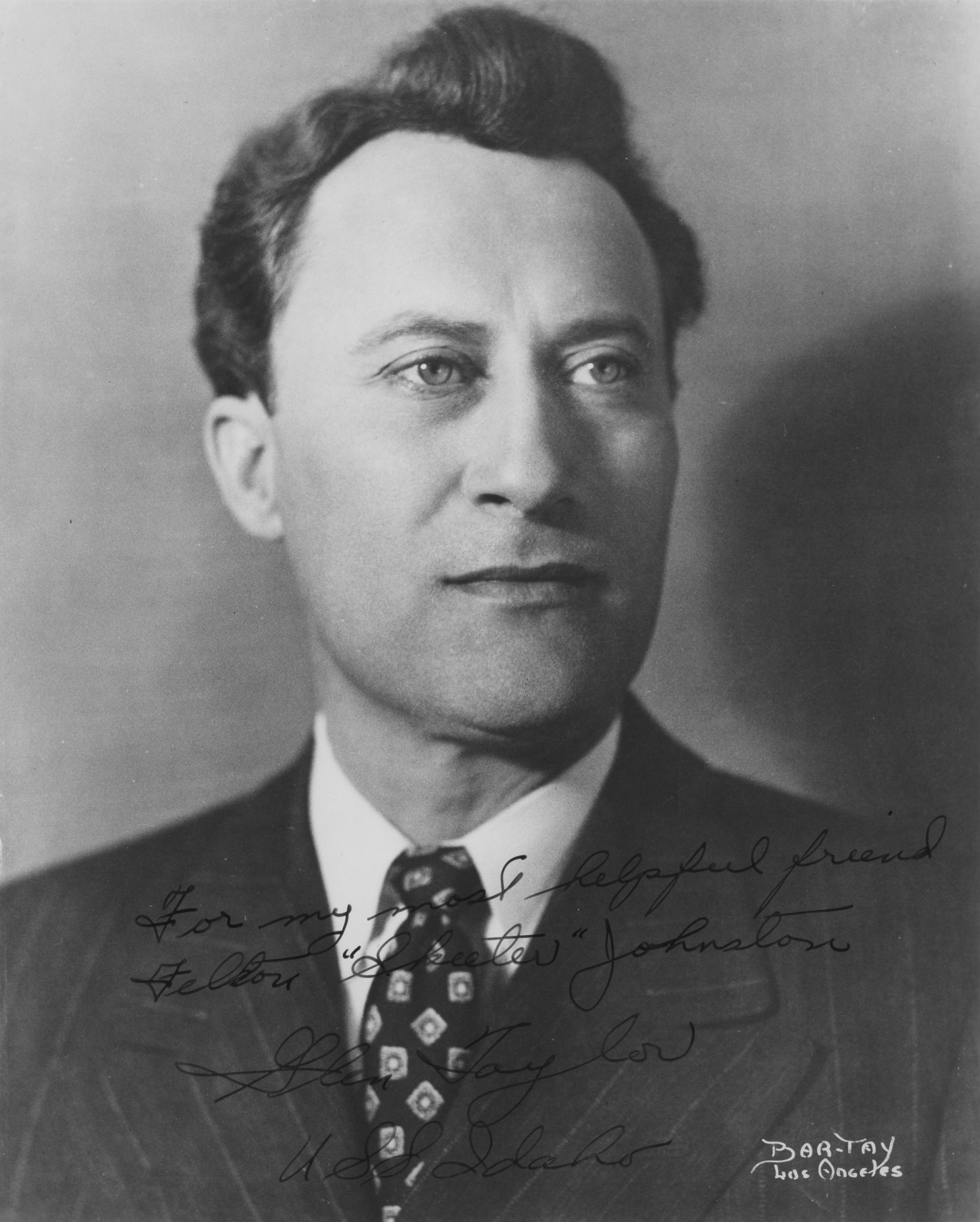

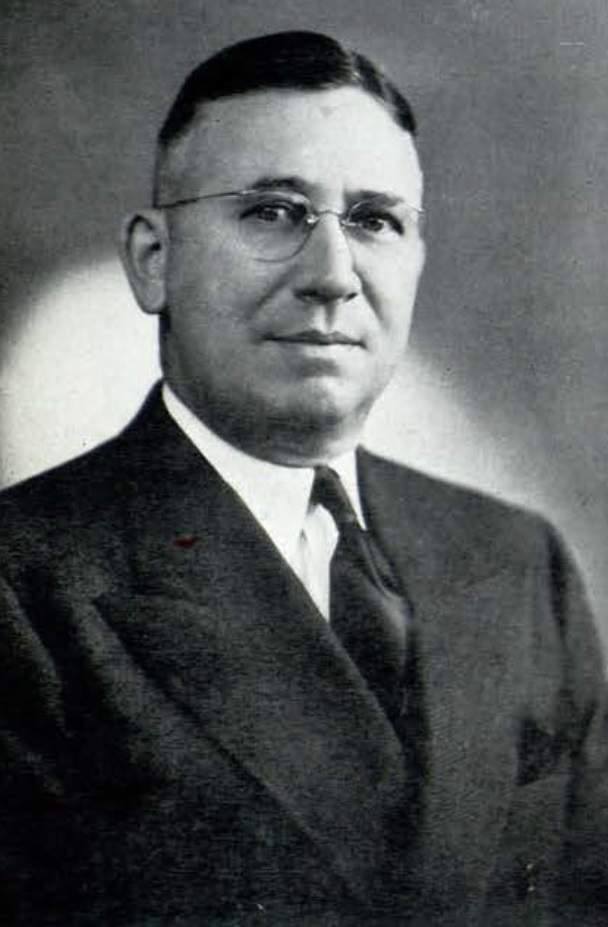
Nominee	Glen H. Taylor	C. A. Bottolfsen
Party	Democratic	Republican
Popular vote	107,096	102,373
Percentage	51.13%	48.87%
- County results Taylor: 50–60% 60–70% Bottolfsen: 50–60% 60–70%
U.S. senator before election
D. Worth Clark
Democratic
Elected U.S. Senator
Glen H. Taylor
Democratic

The 1944 United States Senate election in Idaho took place on November 7, 1944. Incumbent Democratic Senator D. Worth Clark ran for a second term, but was defeated in the Democratic primary by Glen H. Taylor, who had previously lost two elections for the other seat, in 1940 (a special election) and 1942. Glen H. Taylor won the general election against Idaho governor C. A. Bottolfsen.

== Primary elections ==
Primary elections were held on June 13, 1944.

=== Democratic primary ===
James H. Hawley, one of the candidates in this primary, is not former Idaho governor James H. Hawley, as he died nearly 15 years before this primary happened. It's likely that this James H. Hawley is someone who was just trying to fake popularity by having the same name as the former governor.

==== Candidates ====
- D. Worth Clark, incumbent U.S. Senator
- Glen H. Taylor, country-western singer, civil rights activist, and candidate for the other Idaho senate seat in 1940 and 1942
- James H. Hawley
- John W. Cornell

==== Results ====
Democratic primary results
Party	Candidate	Votes	%
Democratic	Glen H. Taylor	10,711	33.24
Democratic	D. Worth Clark (incumbent)	10,495	32.57
Democratic	James H. Hawley	9,302	28.86
Democratic	John W. Cornell	1,720	5.34
Total votes		32,228	

=== Republican primary ===
==== Candidates ====
- C. A. Bottolfsen, incumbent Governor of Idaho (1939-1941, 1943-1945)
- Ben Johnson

==== Results ====
Republican primary results
Party	Candidate	Votes	%
Republican	C. A. Bottolfsen	25,276	63.67
Republican	Ben Johnson	14,422	36.33
Total votes		39,698	

== General election ==
=== Results ===
1944 United States Senate election in Idaho
Party	Candidate	Votes	%
Democratic	Glen H. Taylor	107,096	51.13
Republican	C. A. Bottolfsen	102,373	48.87
Majority		4,723	2.26
Turnout		209,469	
Democratic hold			

== See also ==
- 1944 United States Senate elections
