= 1942 United States Senate election in Idaho =

- November 3, 1942
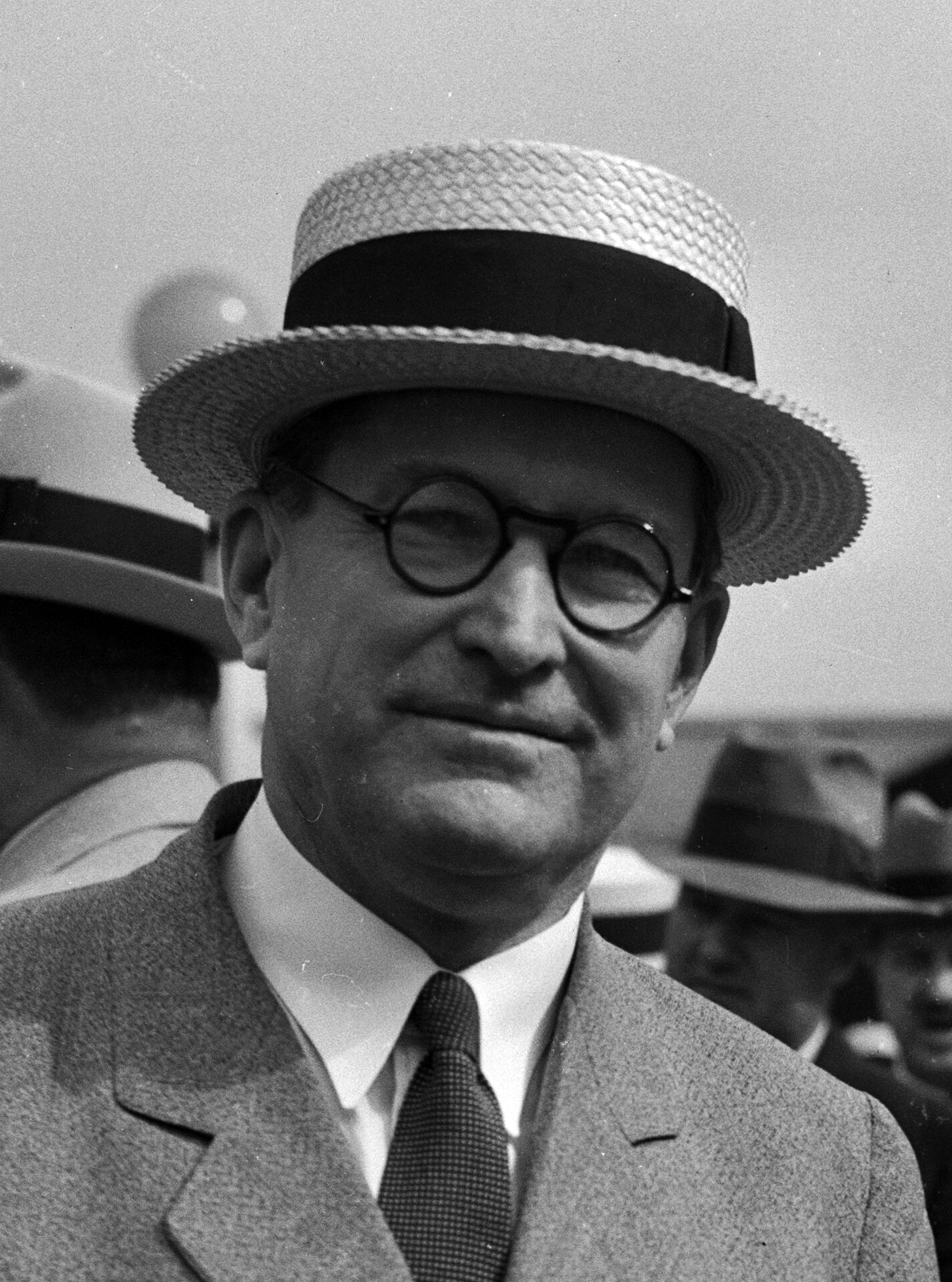

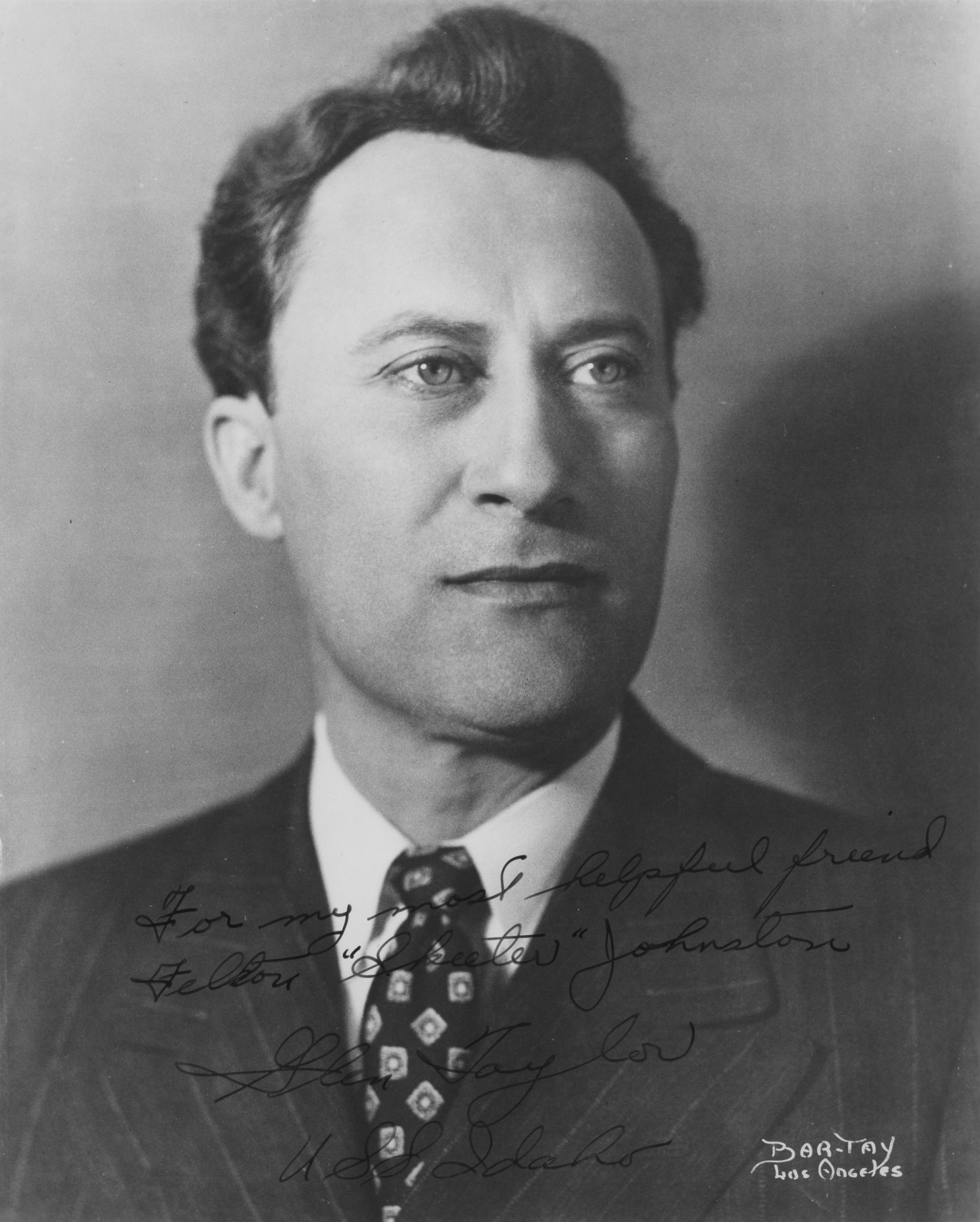
Nominee	John Thomas	Glen H. Taylor
Party	Republican	Democratic
Popular vote	73,353	68,989
Percentage	51.53%	48.47%
- County results Thomas: 50–60% 60–70% Taylor: 50–60% 60–70%
U.S. senator before election
John Thomas
Republican
Elected U.S. Senator
John Thomas
Republican

The 1942 United States Senate election in Idaho took place on November 3, 1942. Incumbent Republican Senator John Thomas, who was appointed by governor C. A. Bottolfsen after the death of William Borah and won a partial term in the 1940 special election, won a full term in a rematch against Glen H. Taylor, who he had also defeated two years earlier in the special election.

However, Thomas would serve less than three years out of the six-year term he was elected to, because he died in office in November 1945, causing another special election in 1946.

== Primary elections ==
Primary elections were held on August 11, 1942.

=== Democratic primary ===
==== Candidates ====
- Glen H. Taylor, country-western singer, civil rights activist, and candidate for this seat in 1940
- Charles C. Gossett, Lieutenant Governor of Idaho (1937-1939, 1941-1943)
- Francis M. Bistline, Speaker of the Idaho House of Representatives
- Owen T. Stratton, candidate for the other Idaho Senate seat in 1932
- James R. Bothwell

==== Results ====
Democratic primary results
Party	Candidate	Votes	%
Democratic	Glen H. Taylor	10,249	31.93
Democratic	Charles C. Gossett	8,197	25.54
Democratic	James R. Bothwell	7,396	23.04
Democratic	Francis M. Bistline	4,550	14.18
Democratic	Owen T. Stratton	1,706	5.31
Total votes		32,098	

=== Republican primary ===
==== Candidates ====
- John Thomas, incumbent U.S. Senator
- John C. Sanborn, former member of the Idaho State Senate
- Presley F. Horne, owner of the John C. Rice House

==== Results ====
Republican primary results
Party	Candidate	Votes	%
Republican	John Thomas (incumbent)	18,947	63.19
Republican	John C. Sanborn	5,582	18.62
Republican	Presley F. Horne	5,455	18.19
Total votes		29,984	

== General election ==
=== Results ===
1942 United States Senate election in Idaho
Party	Candidate	Votes	%
Republican	John Thomas (incumbent)	73,353	51.53
Democratic	Glen H. Taylor	68,989	48.47
Majority		4,364	3.06
Turnout		142,342	
Republican hold			

== See also ==
- 1942 United States Senate elections
