= 1946 United States Senate special election in Idaho =

- November 5, 1946
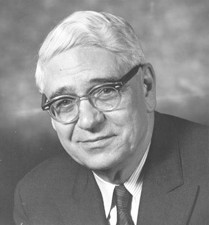

Nominee	Henry Dworshak	George E. Donart
Party	Republican	Democratic
Popular vote	105,523	74,629
Percentage	58.57%	41.43%
- County results Dworshak: 50–60% 60–70% 70–80% Donart: 50–60% 60–70%
U.S. senator before election
Charles Gossett
Democratic
Elected U.S. Senator
Henry Dworshak
Republican

The 1946 United States Senate special election in Idaho took place on November 5, 1946. After John Thomas died, governor Charles Gossett resigned to have his lieutenant governor, Arnold Williams, appoint him to the seat. However, Gossett lost the Democratic primary to George E. Donart, who then lost the general election to Henry Dworshak, the US representative from Idaho's 2nd congressional district.

Many people, including elected officials in Idaho, didn't like Charles Gossett's decision to basically appoint himself to the Senate, and didn't want him to be the nominee for the special election. Glen H. Taylor, Idaho's other Senator at the time, endorsed George E. Donart as a primary challenge against Gossett.

== Primary elections ==
Primary elections were held on June 11, 1946.

=== Democratic primary ===
==== Candidates ====
- Charles Gossett, appointed incumbent U.S. Senator and former Governor of Idaho
- George E. Donart, member of the Idaho State Senate
- Paul L. Geddes

==== Results ====
Democratic primary results
Party	Candidate	Votes	%
Democratic	George E. Donart	19,629	49.49
Democratic	Charles Gossett (incumbent)	17,102	43.11
Democratic	Paul L. Geddes	2,934	7.40
Total votes		39,665	

=== Republican primary ===
==== Candidates ====
- Henry Dworshak, U.S. Representative for Idaho's 2nd congressional district (1939-1946)
- Richard H. Wells
- Orrin E. Lee

==== Results ====
Republican primary results
Party	Candidate	Votes	%
Republican	Henry Dworshak	26,953	72.41
Republican	Richard H. Wells	7,699	20.69
Republican	Orrin E. Lee	2,569	6.90
Total votes		37,221	

== General election ==
=== Results ===
1946 United States Senate special election in Idaho
Party	Candidate	Votes	%
Republican	Henry Dworshak	105,523	58.57
Democratic	George E. Donart	74,629	41.43
Majority		30,894	17.14
Turnout		180,152	
Republican gain from Democratic			

== See also ==
- 1946 United States Senate elections
