= 1948 Democratic Party vice presidential candidate selection =

1948 Democratic vice presidential nomination
- July 13, 1948
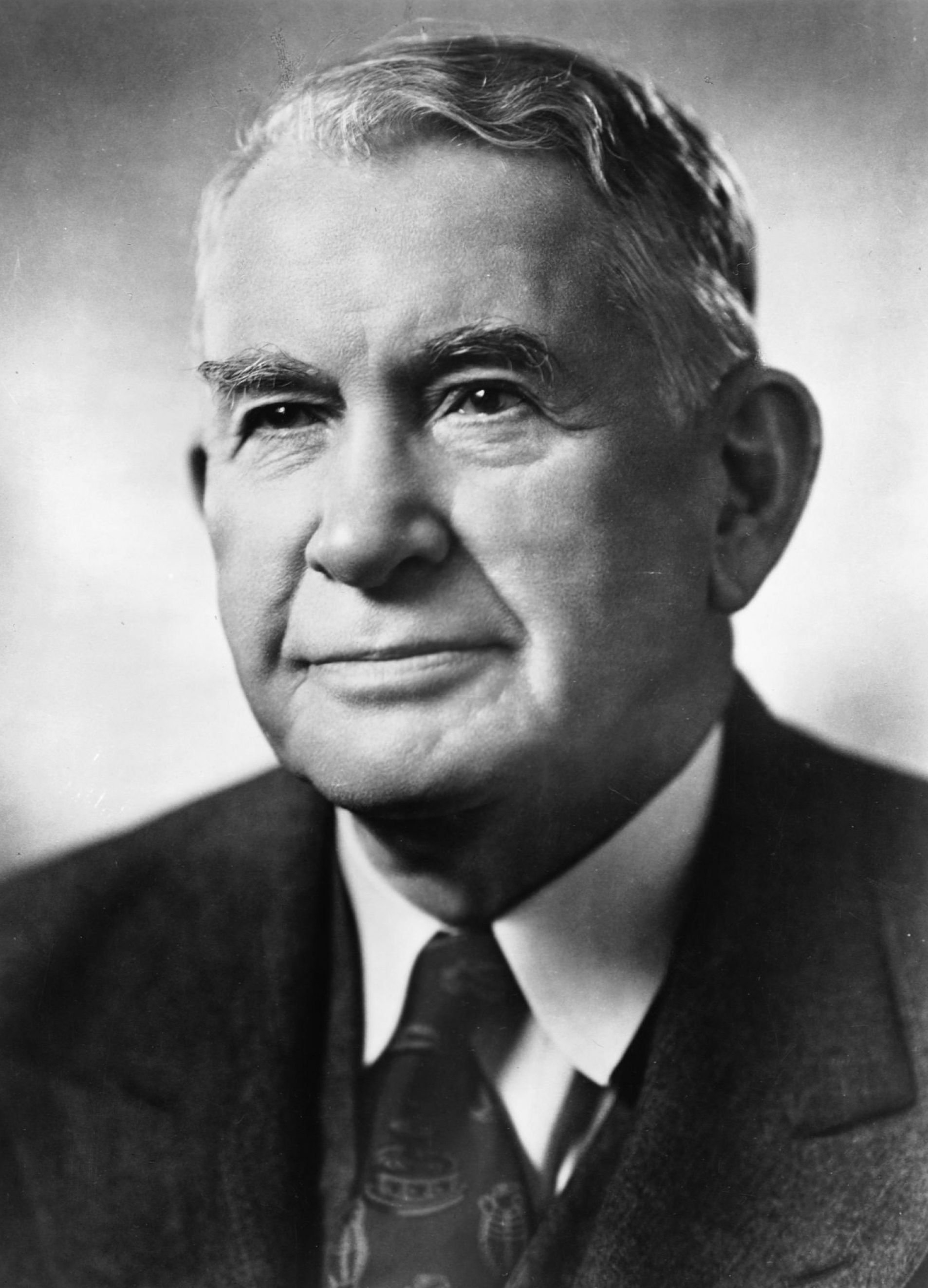
Nominee	Alben W. Barkley
Home state	Kentucky
Previous Vice Presidential nominee
Harry S. Truman
Vice Presidential nominee
Alben W. Barkley

This article lists those who were potential candidates for the Democratic nomination for Vice President of the United States in the 1948 election. At the 1948 Democratic National Convention, President Harry S. Truman won re-nomination for a full term. Truman had become president upon the death of his predecessor and 1944 running mate, Franklin D. Roosevelt. As the 25th Amendment had not yet been passed, there was no method for filling a vice presidential vacancy, and Truman served without a vice president during his first term. Truman's nomination faced significant opposition from the South, as did the party's platform on civil rights. Though Truman attempted to convince Supreme Court Justice William O. Douglas to join the ticket, Douglas declined. Truman instead selected Senate Minority Leader Alben W. Barkley, the preferred choice of many Democratic delegates, and a border state Senator who could appeal to both the Northern and Southern wings of the party. The Truman–Barkley ticket won the 1948 election, defeating the Republican (Dewey–Warren), Progressive (Wallace–Taylor), and Dixiecrat (Thurmond–Wright) tickets.

== Candidates ==
=== Finalists ===
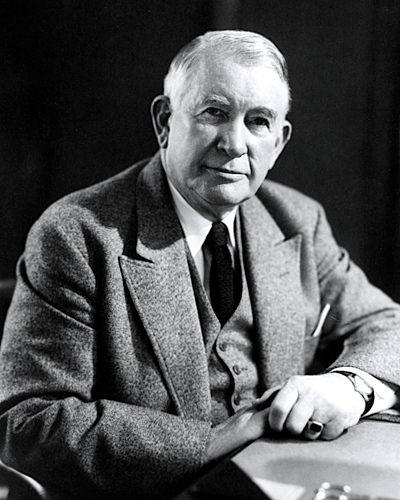
Senator
Alben W. Barkley
from Kentucky
(1927–1949; 1955–1956)

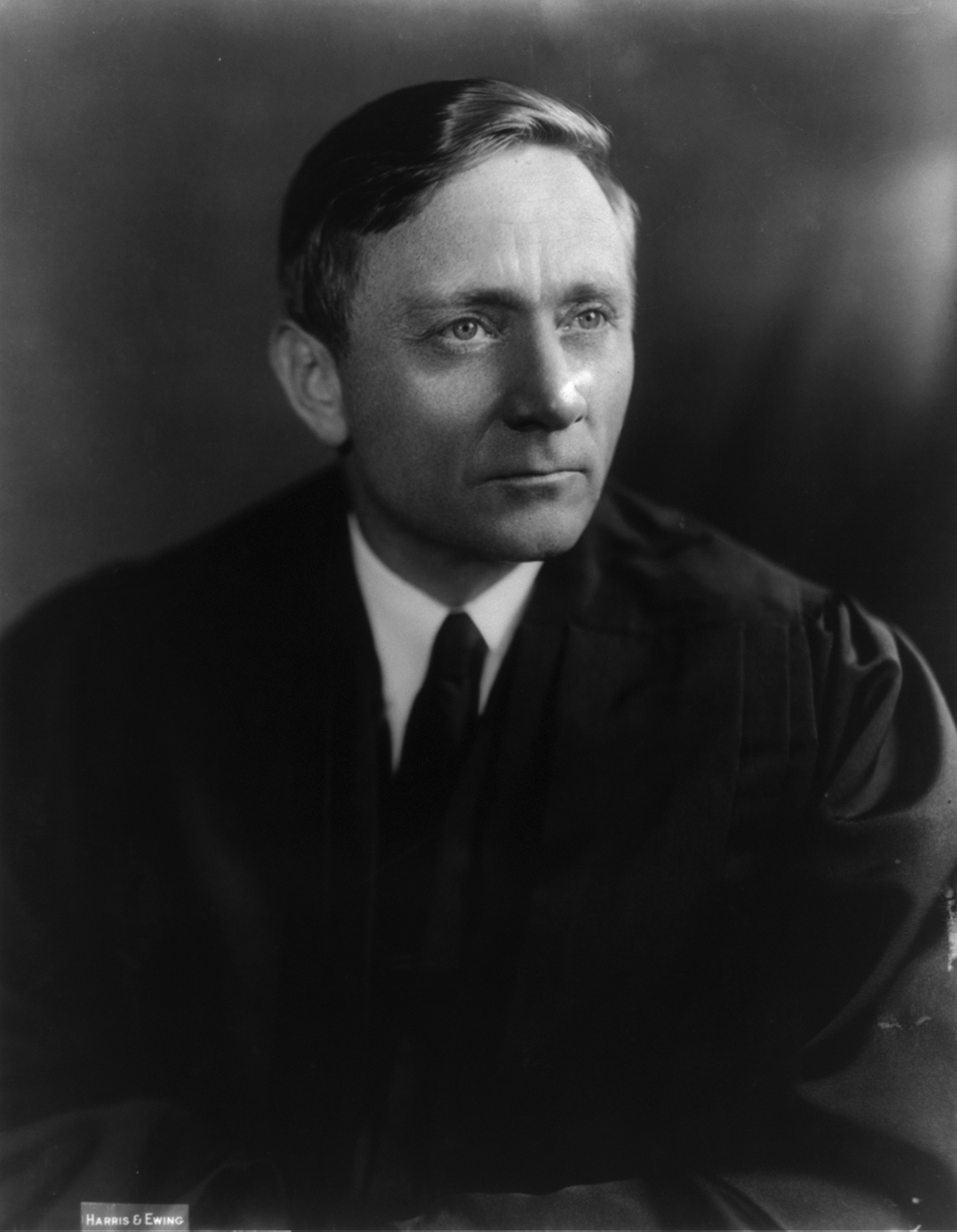
Associate Justice
William O. Douglas
from Connecticut
(1939–1975)

=== Others ===
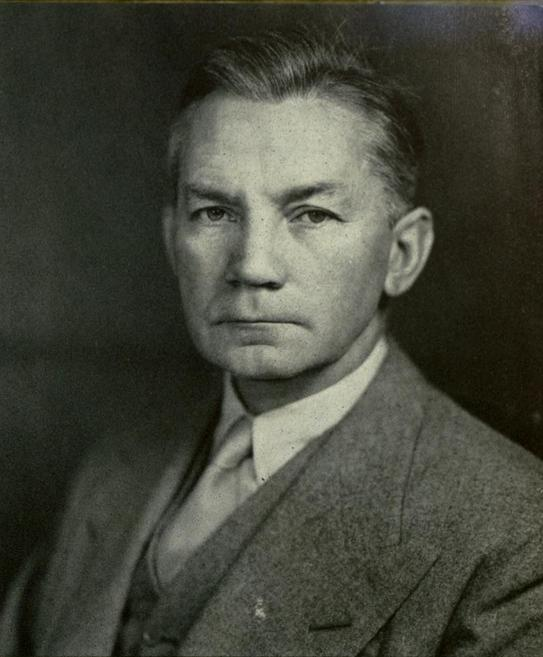
Secretary of Defense
James Forrestal
from New York
(1947–1949)

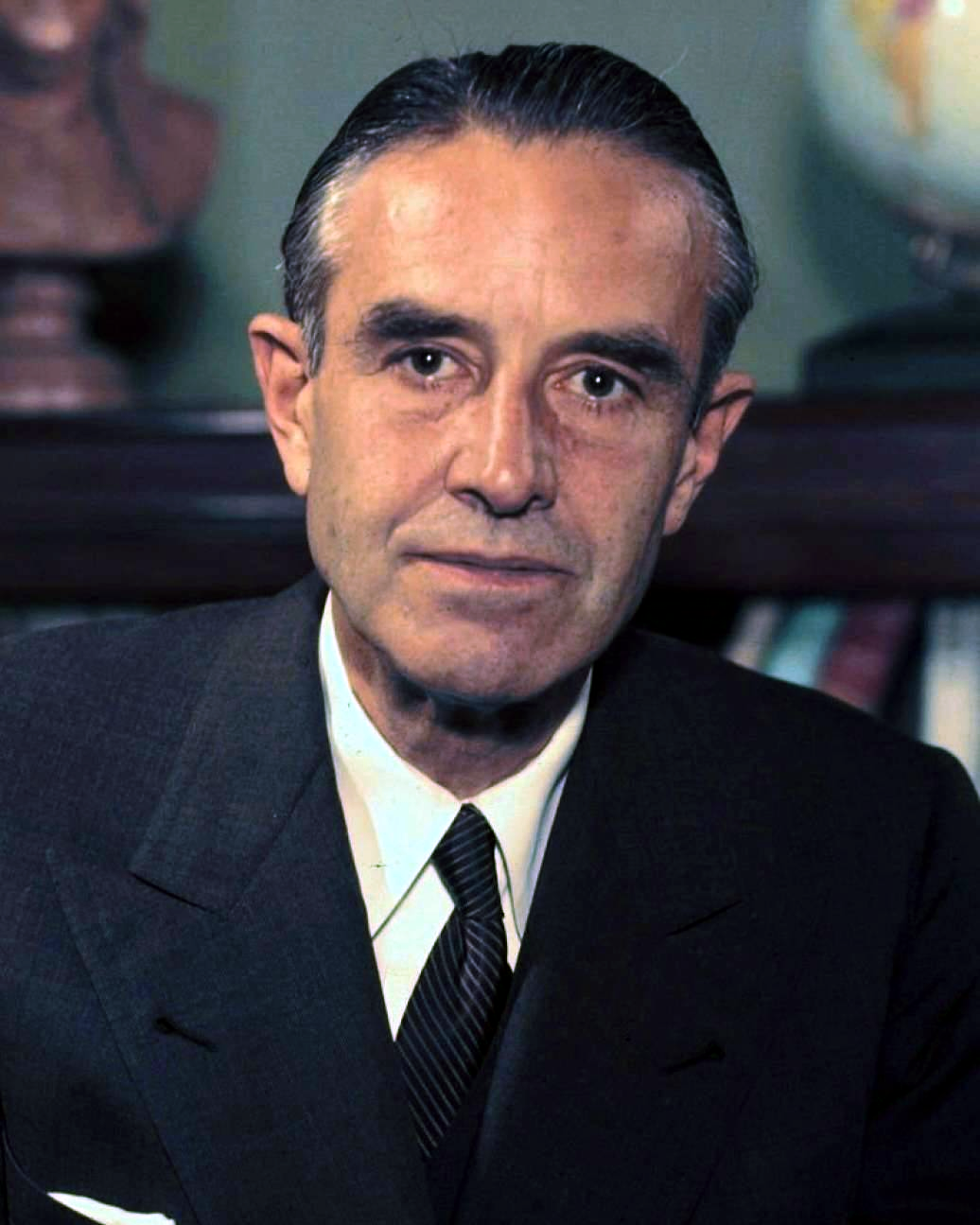
Former Secretary of Commerce
W. Averell Harriman
from New York
(1946–1948)

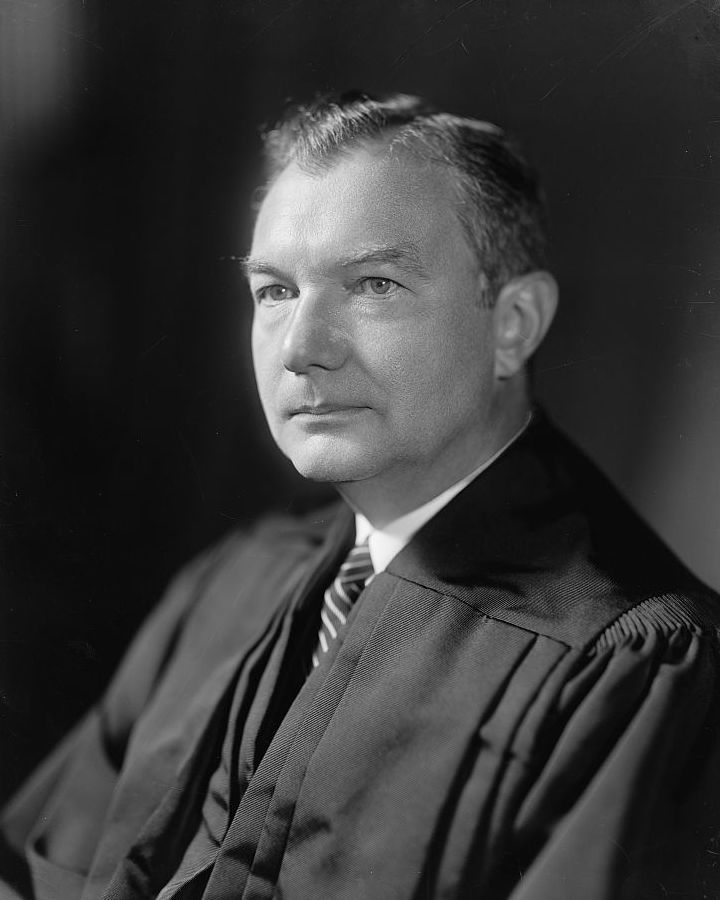
Associate Justice
Robert H. Jackson
from New York
(1941–1954)

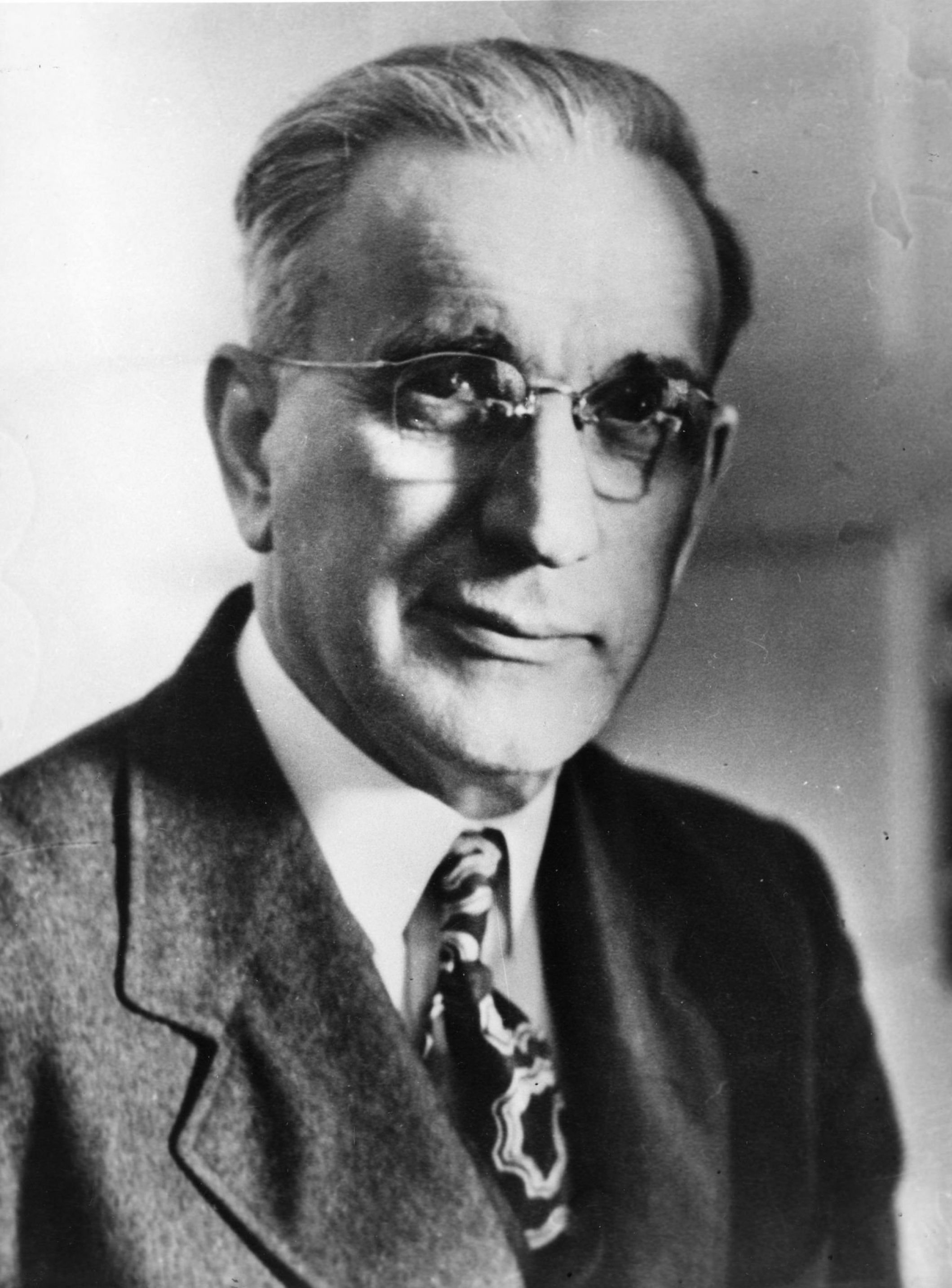
Representative
John W. McCormack
from Massachusetts
(1928–1971)

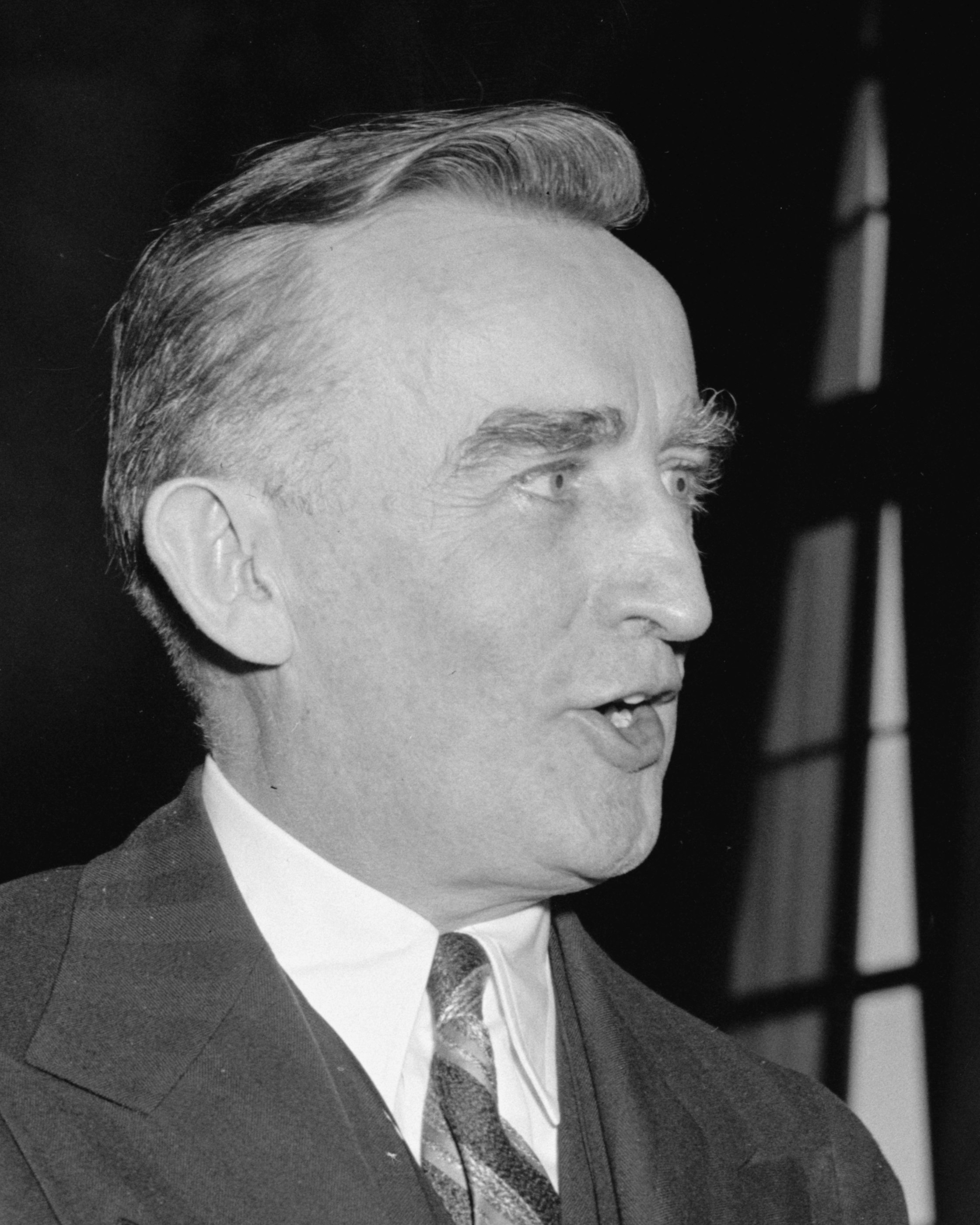
Senator
Joseph C. O'Mahoney
from Wyoming
(1933–1953; 1954–1961)

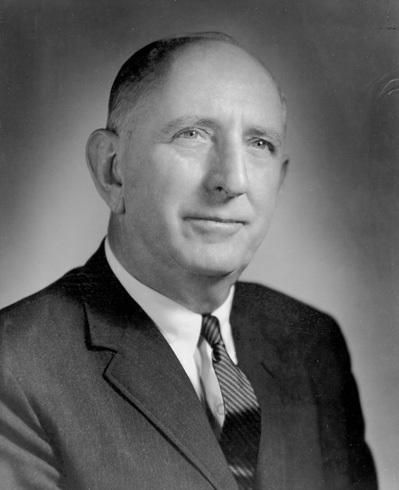
Senator
Richard B. Russell Jr.
from Georgia
(1933–1971)

== See also ==
- 1948 Democratic National Convention
