= 1940 United States Senate special election in Idaho =

- November 5, 1940
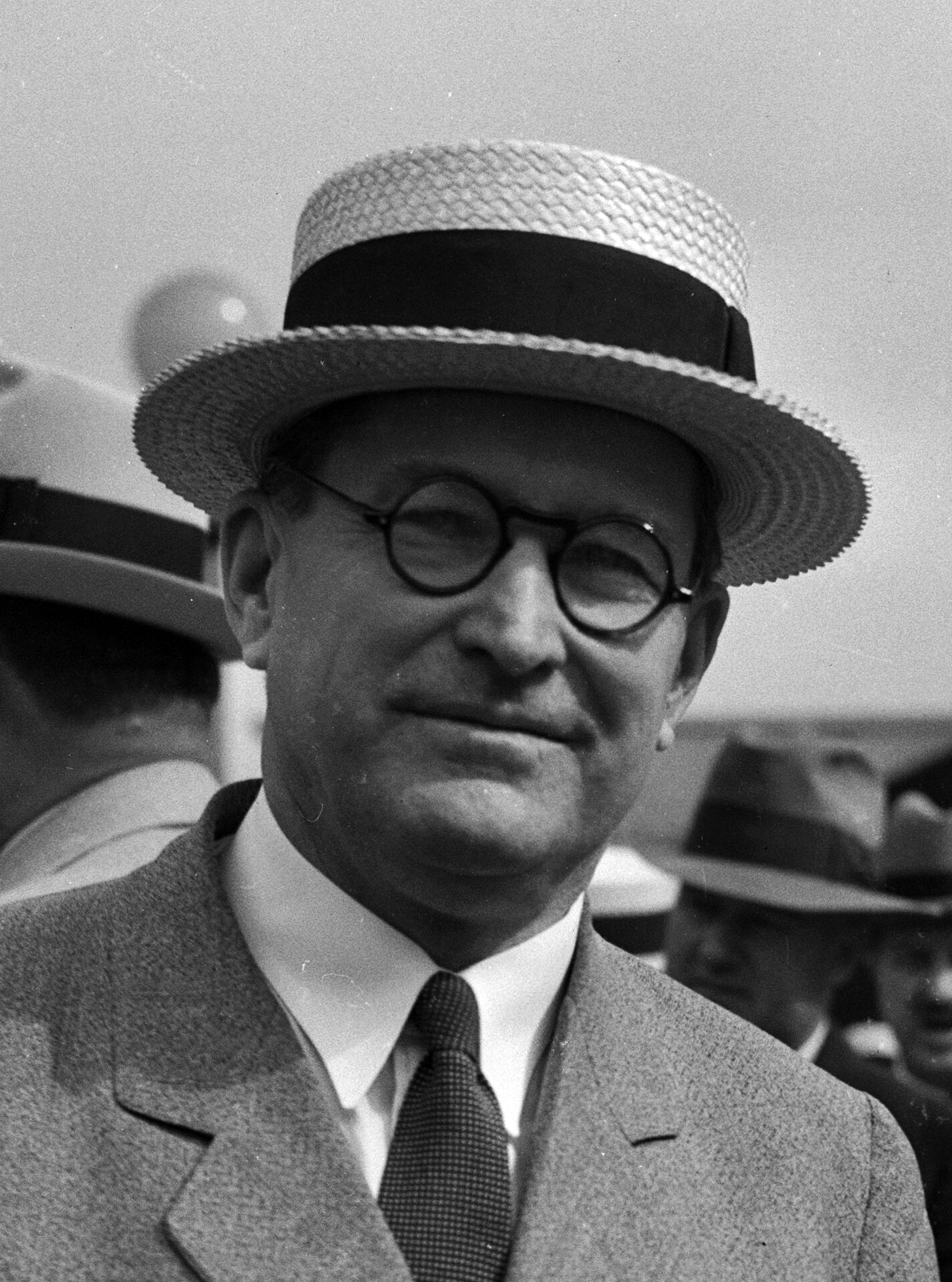

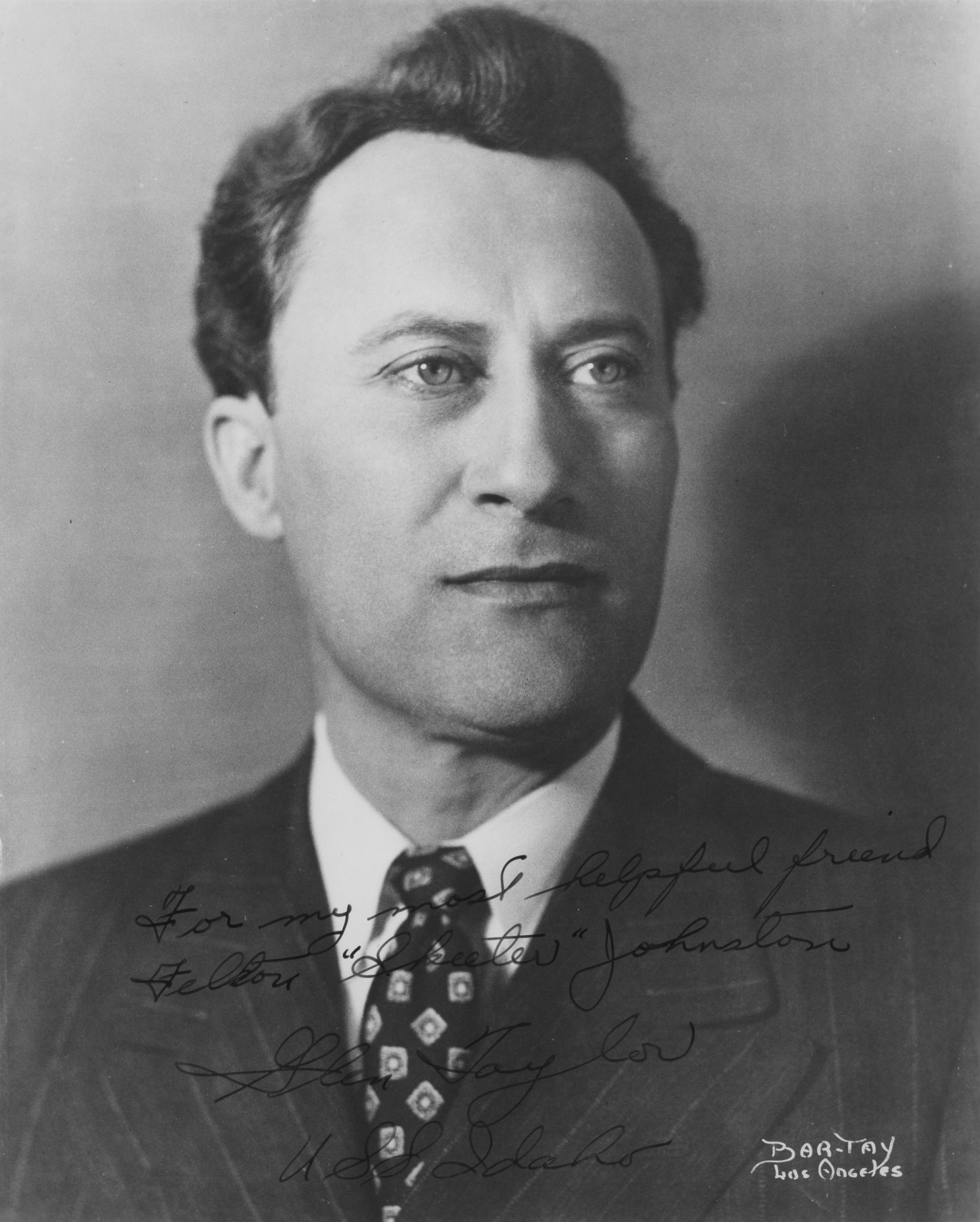
Nominee	John Thomas	Glen H. Taylor
Party	Republican	Democratic
Popular vote	124,535	110,614
Percentage	52.96%	47.04%
- County results Thomas: 50–60% 60–70% 80–90% Taylor: 50–60% 60–70%
U.S. senator before election
John Thomas
Republican
Elected U.S. Senator
John Thomas
Republican

The 1940 United States Senate special election in Idaho took place on November 5, 1940. After six-term Republican Senator William Borah died in January 1940, governor C. A. Bottolfsen appointed former senator John Thomas to the seat, causing a special election to take place. In the special election, Thomas won a partial term, defeating civil rights activist and country-western singer Glen H. Taylor.

== Primary elections ==
Primary elections were held on August 13, 1940.

=== Democratic primary ===
==== Candidates ====
- Glen H. Taylor, civil rights activist and country-western singer
- George E. Donart, member of the Idaho State Senate
- James R. Bothwell

==== Results ====
Democratic primary results
Party	Candidate	Votes	%
Democratic	Glen H. Taylor	18,984	35.78
Democratic	James R. Bothwell	17,935	33.80
Democratic	George E. Donart	16,145	30.42
Total votes		53,064	

=== Republican primary ===
==== Candidates ====
- John Thomas, appointed incumbent U.S. Senator
- Abe McGregor Goff, president of the Idaho Bar Association and former Latah County Attorney
- J. D. "Cy" Price, Secretary of State of Idaho
- Frank H. Adams, candidate for Idaho's other Senate seat in 1938
- E. W. Sinclair
- Elvin Dulaney
- Frank B. Dotson

==== Results ====
Republican primary results
Party	Candidate	Votes	%
Republican	John Thomas (incumbent)	32,732	60.66
Republican	Abe McGregor Goff	7,476	13.86
Republican	J. D. "Cy" Price	4,647	8.61
Republican	E. W. Sinclair	4,021	7.45
Republican	Frank H. Adams	2,094	3.88
Republican	Elvin Dulaney	1,537	2.85
Republican	Frank B. Dotson	1,451	2.69
Total votes		53,958	

== General election ==
=== Results ===
1940 United States Senate special election in Idaho
Party	Candidate	Votes	%
Republican	John Thomas	124,535	52.96
Democratic	Glen H. Taylor	110,614	47.04
Majority		13,921	5.92
Turnout		235,149	
Republican hold			

== See also ==
- 1940 United States Senate elections
