= George E. Donart =

American politician (1889–1961)

George Donart

Member of the Idaho Senate
- In office 1947–1943
- In office 1933–1941

Personal details
- Born: February 27, 1889 Cambridge, Idaho Territory, U.S.
- Died: October 1, 1961 (aged 72)
- Party: Democratic
- Education: University of Idaho (BA, LLB)

George E. Donart (February 27, 1889 – October 1, 1961) was an American attorney and politician who served as a member of the Idaho Senate from 1933 to 1941 and again from 1943 to 1947. He was the Democratic nominee in a 1946 special election for the United States Senate seat to finish the term of John Thomas, a Republican who died in November 1945.

== Early life and education ==
Born in Idaho Territory near present-day Cambridge, Donart graduated from the prep school of the University of Idaho in Moscow in 1909, then earned a Bachelor of Arts and Bachelor of Laws degree.

== Career ==
Donart practiced law in Weiser for decades and as a member of the Idaho Senate from 1933 to 1941 and from 1943 to 1947.

=== 1946 Senate race ===
After Senator John Thomas's death in 1945, Governor Charles Gossett, a Democrat, resigned and allowed his successor Arnold Williams to appoint him to the Senate vacancy, which in turn allowed him to enter the special election race as the incumbent. During the 1946 primary race, Donart was endorsed by Idaho's other U. S. Senator, Glen Taylor, who had defeated him in the 1940 primary.

Donart defeated Gossett in the Democratic primary, but was defeated in the general election by Republican congressman Henry Dworshak.

== Personal life ==
Donart died at age 72 in 1961, and is buried at Hillcrest Cemetery in Weiser.

Party political offices
Preceded by Glen H. Taylor	Democratic Party nominee, U.S. Senator (Class 2) from Idaho; 1946 special (lost)	Succeeded by Bert H. Miller
