= 1940 Idaho gubernatorial election =

- November 5, 1940
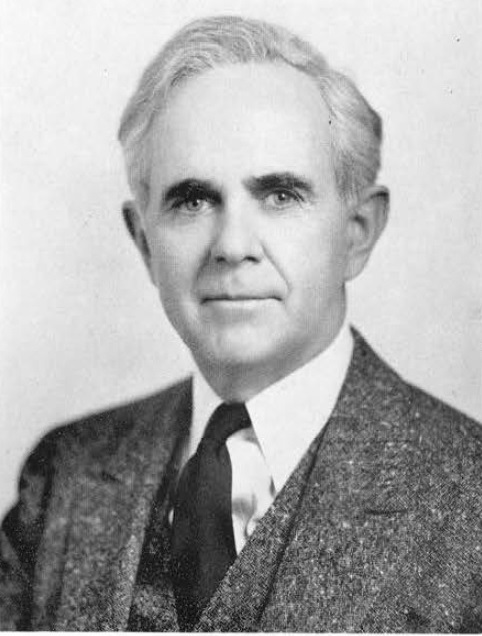

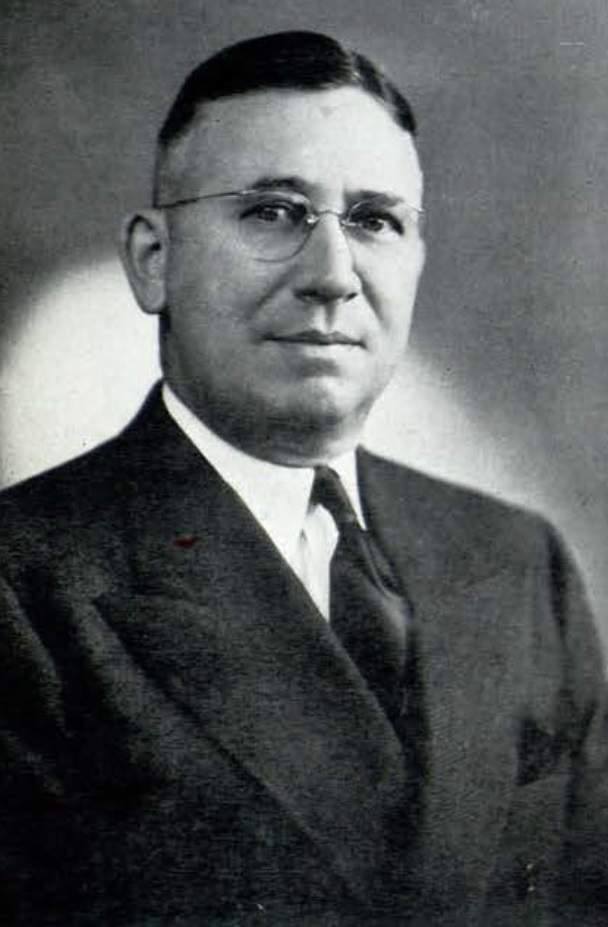
Nominee	Chase Clark	C. A. Bottolfsen
Party	Democratic	Republican
Popular vote	120,420	118,117
Percentage	50.48%	49.52%
- County results Clark: 50–60% 60–70% Bottolfsen: 50–60% 60–70% 70–80%
Governor before election
C. A. Bottolfsen
Republican
Elected Governor
Chase Clark
Democratic

The 1940 Idaho gubernatorial election was held on November 5. Democratic nominee Chase Clark defeated incumbent Republican C. A. Bottolfsen with 50.48% of the vote.

The next election in 1942 was a rematch, also close, with different results.

== Primary elections ==
Primary elections were held on August 13, 1940.

=== Democratic primary ===
==== Candidates ====
- Chase Clark, Idaho Falls mayor
- J. W. Taylor, attorney general
- James Barnes, Hansen farmer, former county commissioner

=== Republican primary ===
==== Candidates ====
- C. A. Bottolfsen, Arco, incumbent governor
- Thomas McDougall, Boise attorney

== General election ==
=== Candidates ===
- Chase A. Clark, Democratic
- C. A. Bottolfsen, Republican

=== Results ===
1940 Idaho gubernatorial election
Party	Candidate	Votes	%	±%
Democratic	Chase A. Clark	120,420	50.48%	
Republican	C. A. Bottolfsen (incumbent)	118,117	49.52%	
Majority		2,303		
Turnout				
Democratic gain from Republican		Swing		
