= Elmwood Cemetery (Gooding, Idaho) =

Cemetery in Gooding County, Idaho, US

Coordinates: 42°55′49″N 114°42′06″W

- Interactive map of Elmwood Cemetery

Details
- Location: Gooding, Idaho
- Find a Grave: Elmwood Cemetery

Elmwood Cemetery is a cemetery in Gooding, Idaho.

== Notable burials ==
- Frank R. Gooding (1859–1928) – Governor of Idaho 1905–09, U.S. Senator 1921–28. Namesake of the city and county.
- James Henry Mays (1868–1926) – U.S. Representative from Utah 1915–21.
- John Thomas (1874–1945) – U.S. Senator 1928–33 and 1940–45.
