= Donald A. Callahan =

American politician

Donald Alphonse Callahan (September 8, 1876 – October 26, 1951) was a mining industry leader and Republican politician from Idaho.

== Early life, education, and career ==
Born and raised in Galena, Illinois, Callahan had little access to education in his youth; he entered high school at the age of twenty and graduated sixteen months later. He then read law in a law office in that city for three years to gain admission to the bar in Illinois. He worked as a deputy to a federal court clerk in Freeport, Illinois, where he was also the local supervisor of the 1910 United States census, and then entered the practice of law in Chicago. In 1918, he moved to Wallace, Idaho.

== Political activities and mining industry leadership ==
Callahan served in both chambers of the Idaho Legislature. He was a member of the Idaho House of Representatives from 1921 to 1922 and a member of the Idaho Senate from 1923 to 1934. During his senate service, he chaired the senate finance committee for two terms. He was the 1938 Republican nominee for the United States Senate seat in Idaho. He was narrowly defeated by Democratic Congressman D. Worth Clark.

Callahan was "a prominent figure in the nation's mining industry", having been president of Callahan Consolidated Mining, and of the Eastern Lead company, and having "frequently acted as spokesman for district mine operators before congressional committees". In 1936, he was chairman of the Northwest Mining association.

== Personal life and death ==
A Roman Catholic, he died in a Los Angeles hospital at the age of 76, having had a heart attack while attending an American Mining Congress convention in that city. He was survived by his wife and one daughter.

Party political offices
Preceded by John Thomas	Republican Party nominee, U.S. Senator (Class 3) from Idaho; 1938 (lost)	Succeeded by C. A. Bottolfsen

== Sources ==
- Political Graveyard article on Callahan
