= D. Worth Clark =

American politician

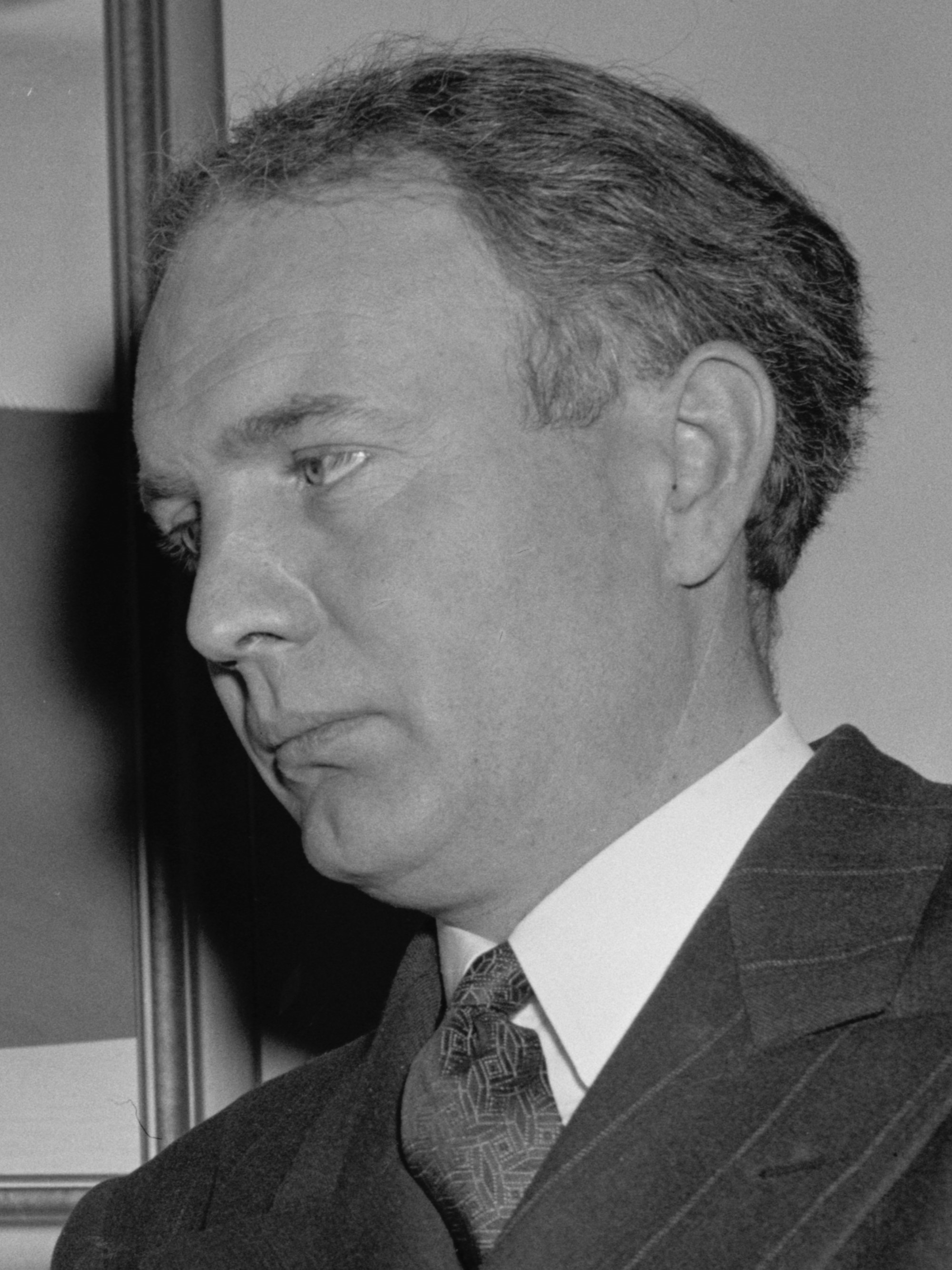
- Clark in 1939

United States Senator from Idaho
- In office January 3, 1939 – January 3, 1945
- Preceded by: James P. Pope
- Succeeded by: Glen H. Taylor

Member of the U.S. House of Representatives from Idaho's 2nd district
- In office January 3, 1935 – January 3, 1939
- Preceded by: Thomas Coffin
- Succeeded by: Henry Dworshak

Personal details
- Born: April 2, 1902 Idaho Falls, Idaho, U.S.
- Died: June 19, 1955 (aged 53) Los Angeles, California, U.S.
- Resting place: Holy Cross Cemetery, Culver City, California
- Party: Democratic
- Spouse: Virgil Irwin (m. 1926)
- Children: 3, including Nancy
- Education: University of Notre Dame (A.B. 1922); Harvard Law School, 1925
- Profession: Attorney

David Worth Clark (April 2, 1902 – June 19, 1955) was a Democratic U.S. representative and senator from Idaho, its first U.S. senator born in the state.

== Early years ==
Clark was born in Idaho Falls, Idaho and attended public schools there. He attended Columbia University in Portland, Oregon, and the University of Notre Dame in South Bend, Indiana, where he earned a bachelor's degree in 1922.

Clark graduated from Harvard Law School in 1925 and was admitted to the bar that year. He commenced practice in Idaho at Pocatello, and was the state's assistant attorney general from 1933 to 1935.

== Congress ==
=== House ===
Clark was elected to the U.S. House from the 2nd district of Idaho in 1934. The seat had been vacant for several months, since the untimely death of Thomas Coffin in June. Clark was re-elected in 1936, easily defeating his successor, newspaper publisher Henry Dworshak of Burley.

U.S. House elections (Idaho's 2nd district): Results 1934–1936
Year	Democrat	Votes	Pct	Republican	Votes	Pct
1934	D. Worth Clark	57,547	60.7%	Heber Q. Hale	37,200	39.3%
1936	D. Worth Clark (inc.)	67,238	60.5%	Henry Dworshak	43,834	39.5%

=== Senate ===
Clark ran for the U.S. Senate in 1938 and narrowly won the Democratic primary in August over incumbent James Pope of Boise, a setback for New Deal supporters. In the general election, Clark defeated Republican former state Representative Donald Callahan of Wallace. Six years later, he was defeated for renomination in the 1944 Democratic primary by Glen H. Taylor of Pocatello.

Clark vied to reclaim his Senate seat in 1950 and defeated Taylor in the primary, as Taylor became the third consecutive incumbent of that Senate seat to lose in the Democratic primary. In the general election in November, Clark lost to Republican state Senator Herman Welker of Payette, as all four congressional seats (two House, two Senate) went to Republicans. Welker aligned himself in the Senate with the infamous Joseph McCarthy of Wisconsin and lost his re-election bid in 1956 to 32 year-old Frank Church of Boise (husband of Clark's cousin, Bethine), who served four terms.

U.S. Senate elections in Idaho (Class III): Results 1938, 1950
Year	Democrat	Votes	Pct	Republican	Votes	Pct	3rd Party	Party	Votes	Pct
1938	D. Worth Clark	99,801	54.7%	Donald Callahan	81,939	44.9%	V.A. Verbei	Progressive	845	0.46%
1950	D. Worth Clark	77,180	38.3%	Herman Welker	124,237	61.7%				

== After Congress ==
After losing to Welker, Clark resumed the practice of law in Boise and Washington, D.C. He moved to Los Angeles in 1954 and held financial interests in radio stations in Van Nuys, San Francisco, and Honolulu, and a bank in Las Vegas.

== Death ==
While watching television with his wife and youngest daughter, Clark died of a heart attack at his southern California home at age 53 on June 19, 1955, and was buried in Holy Cross Cemetery in Culver City, California.

== Personal ==
Clark was a member of a prominent Idaho political family; his uncles Barzilla Clark and Chase Clark both served as governor of Idaho. His cousin Bethine, Chase Clark's daughter, married future U.S. Senator Frank Church in 1947.

Clark's wife Virgil (1901–1991) was a sister-in-law of Robert Smylie; the three-term (1955–1967) Republican governor of Idaho married her younger sister Lucile.

U.S. House of Representatives
Preceded by Thomas C. Coffin	Member of the U.S. House of Representatives from Idaho's 2nd congressional district January 3, 1935–January 3, 1939	Succeeded by Henry Dworshak
Party political offices
Preceded by James P. Pope	Democratic Party nominee, U.S. Senator (Class 3) from Idaho; 1938 (won)	Succeeded by Glen H. Taylor
Preceded by Glen H. Taylor	Democratic Party nominee, U.S. Senator (Class 3) from Idaho; 1950 (lost)	Succeeded by Frank Church
U.S. Senate
Preceded by James P. Pope	U.S. senator (Class 3) from Idaho; January 3, 1939–January 3, 1945; Served alongside: William Borah, John Thomas	Succeeded by Glen H. Taylor
