= 1932 United States Senate election in Idaho =

- November 8, 1932
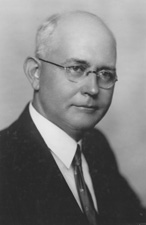

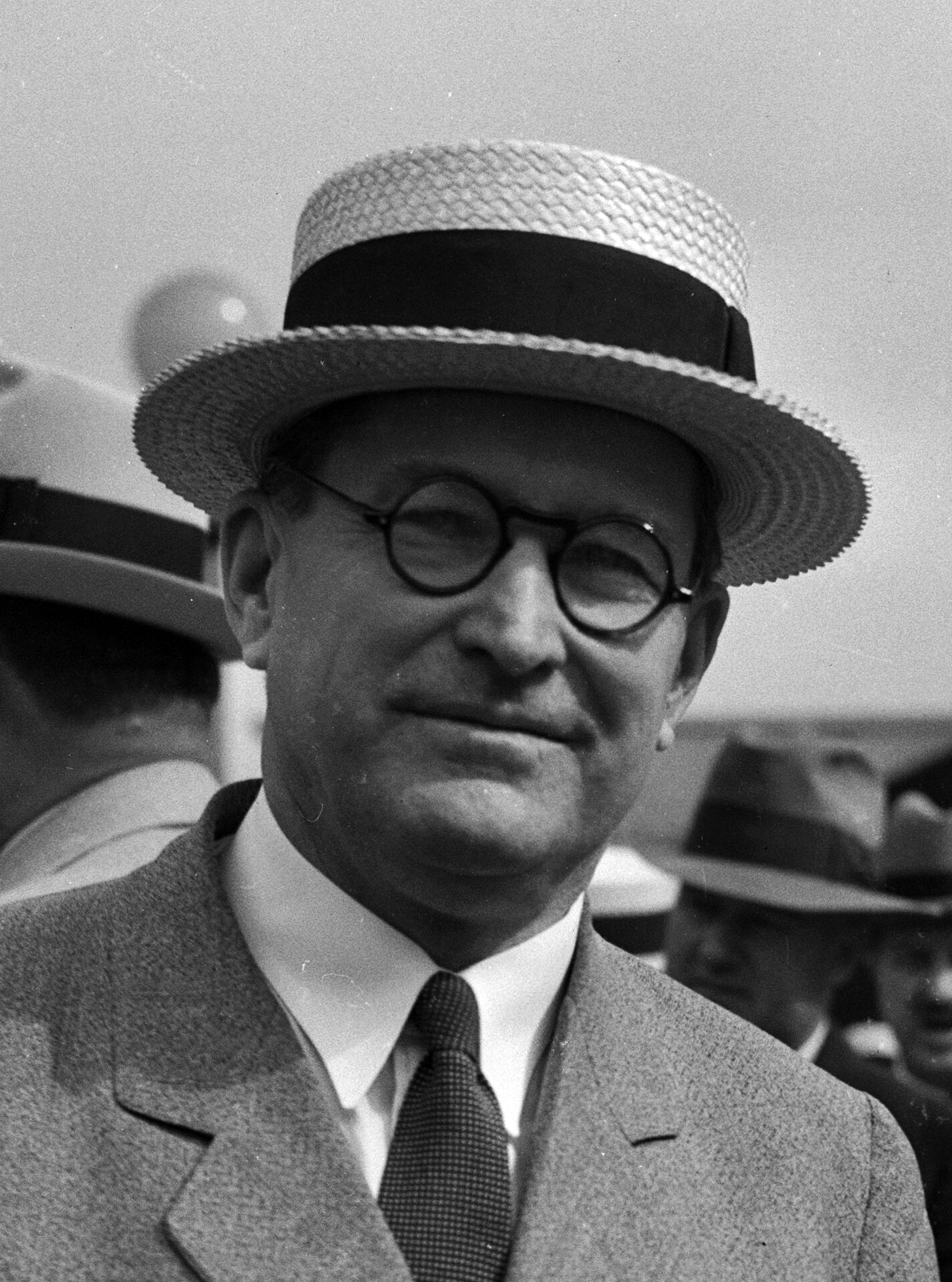
Nominee	James P. Pope	John Thomas
Party	Democratic	Republican
Popular vote	103,020	78,325
Percentage	55.64%	42.30%
- County results Pope: 40–50% 50–60% 60–70% Thomas: 50–60%
U.S. senator before election
John Thomas
Republican
Elected U.S. Senator
James P. Pope
Democratic

The 1932 United States Senate election in Idaho took place on November 8, 1932. Incumbent Republican Senator John Thomas, who had previously won the special election in 1928 after the death of Frank R. Gooding, ran for a full term, but lost to James P. Pope. Franklin D. Roosevelt's coattails from the 1932 presidential election, and the Republican party's bad reputation due to the Great Depression, were the main cause of John Thomas's loss.

John Thomas would later be appointed to the Idaho's other Senate seat in 1940 after William Borah's death, and would continue to serve in that seat until his own death in 1945.

== Primary elections ==
Primary elections were held on May 24, 1932.

=== Democratic primary ===
==== Candidates ====
- James P. Pope, Mayor of Boise (1929-1933)
- G. P. Mix, Lieutenant Governor of Idaho (1931-1933)
- W. Orr Chapman
- Harry S. Kessler
- Owen T. Stratton

==== Results ====
Democratic primary results
Party	Candidate	Votes	%
Democratic	James P. Pope	14,910	37.53
Democratic	W. Orr Chapman	8,494	21.38
Democratic	G. P. Mix	7,455	18.77
Democratic	Harry S. Kessler	4,647	11.70
Democratic	Owen T. Stratton	4,219	10.62
Total votes		39,725	

=== Republican primary ===
==== Candidates ====
- John Thomas, incumbent U.S. Senator
- J. Wesley Holden, member of the Idaho State Senate

==== Results ====
Republican primary results
Party	Candidate	Votes	%
Republican	John Thomas (incumbent)	32,812	66.65
Republican	J. Wesley Holden	16,418	33.35
Total votes		49,230	

== General election ==
=== Results ===
1932 United States Senate election in Idaho
Party	Candidate	Votes	%
Democratic	James P. Pope	103,020	55.64
Republican	John Thomas (incumbent)	78,325	42.31
Liberty	Earl A. Oliason	3,801	2.05
Majority		24,695	13.33
Turnout		185,146	
Democratic gain from Republican			

== See also ==
- 1932 United States Senate elections
