= 1942 Idaho gubernatorial election =

- November 3, 1942
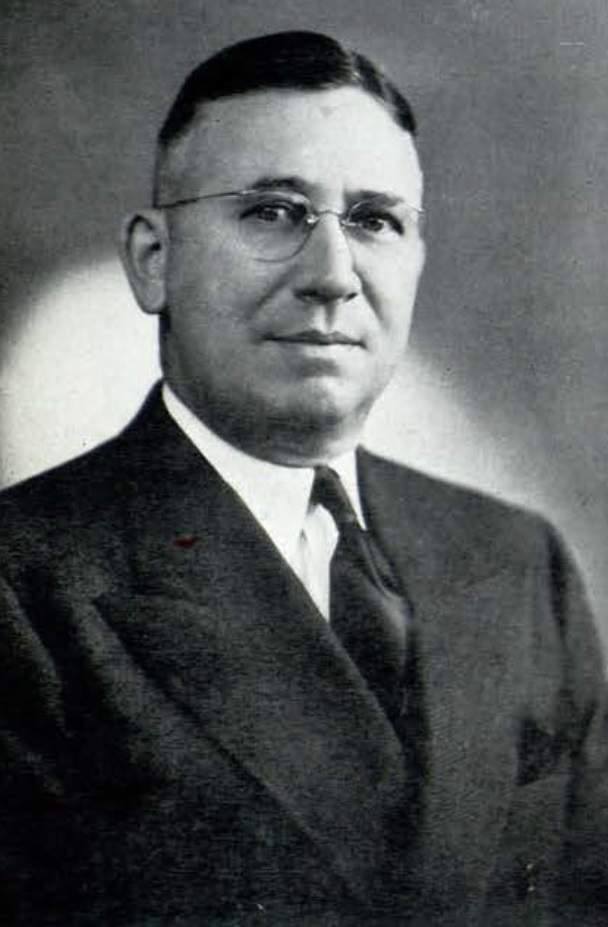

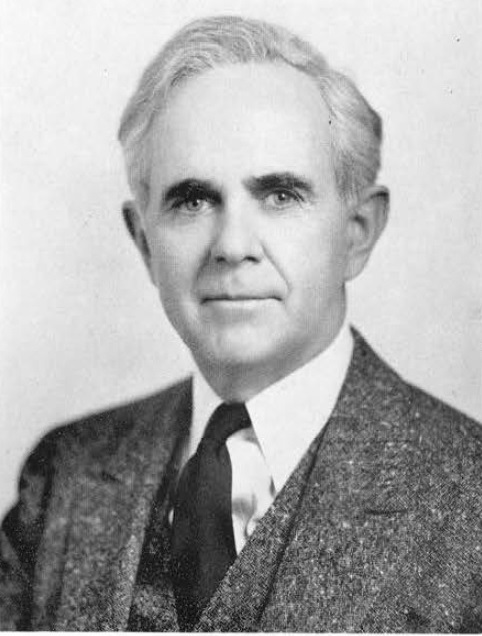
Nominee	C. A. Bottolfsen	Chase Clark
Party	Republican	Democratic
Popular vote	72,260	71,826
Percentage	50.15%	49.85%
- County results Bottolfsen: 50–60% 60–70% 70–80% Clark: 50–60% 60–70% 70–80%
Governor before election
Chase Clark
Democratic
Elected Governor
C. A. Bottolfsen
Republican

The 1942 Idaho gubernatorial election was held on November 3. Republican nominee and former governor C. A. Bottolfsen defeated Democratic incumbent Chase Clark with 50.15% of the vote.

This was a rematch of the 1940 election, with different results.

== Primary elections ==
Primary elections were held on August 11, 1942.

=== Democratic primary ===
==== Candidate ====
- Chase Clark, Idaho Falls, incumbent governor (unopposed)

=== Republican primary ===
==== Candidates ====
- C. A. Bottolfsen, Arco, former governor
- W. H. Detweiler, Hazelton, state legislator
- Thomas McDougall, Boise attorney

== General election ==
=== Candidates ===
- C. A. Bottolfsen, Republican
- Chase Clark, Democratic

=== Results ===
1942 Idaho gubernatorial election
Party	Candidate	Votes	%	±%
Republican	C. A. Bottolfsen	72,260	50.15%	
Democratic	Chase Clark (incumbent)	71,826	49.85%	
Majority		434		
Turnout				
Republican gain from Democratic		Swing		
