= John Thomas (Idaho politician) =

American politician (1874–1945)

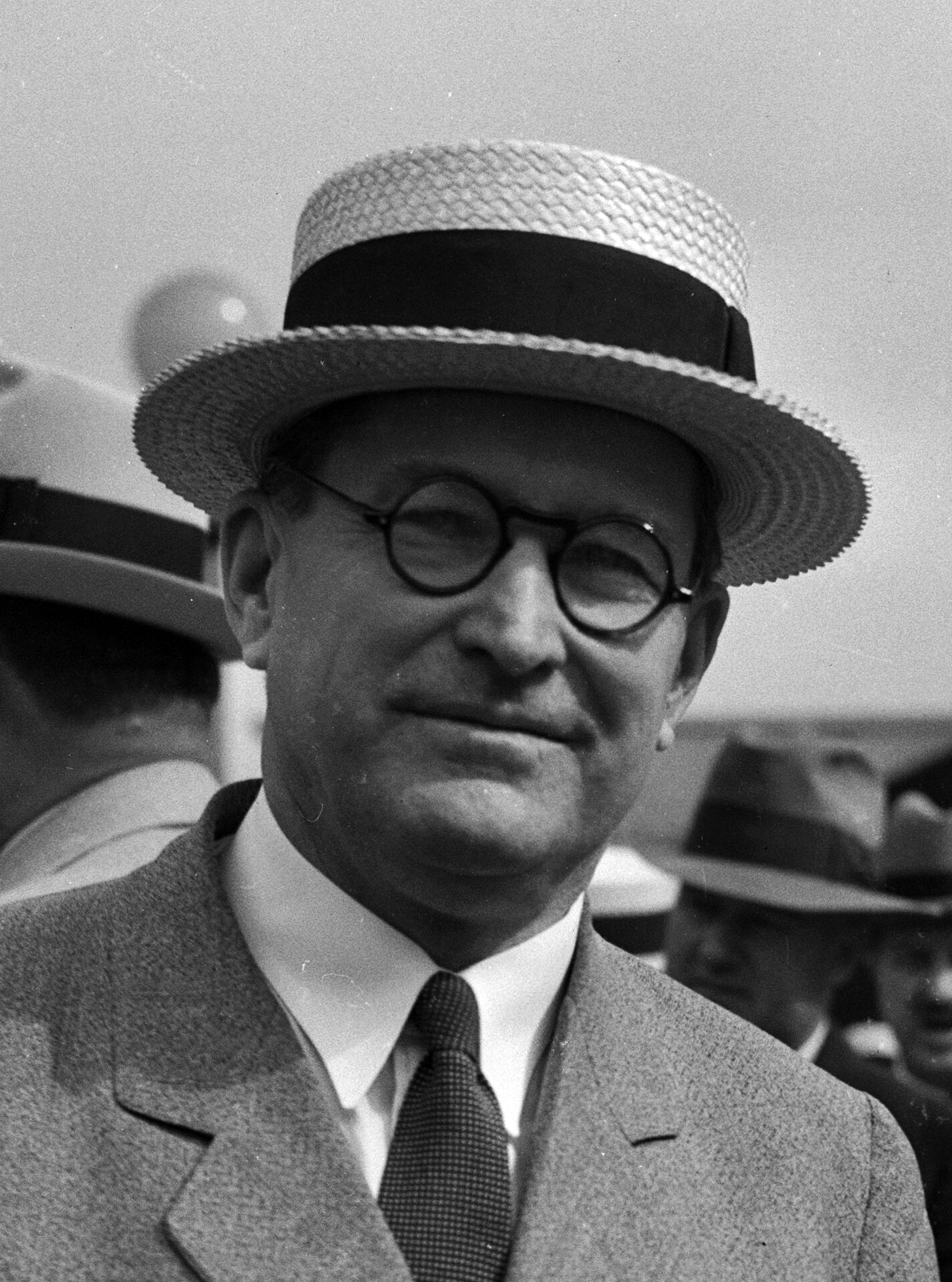
- Thomas, 1929–1933

United States Senator from Idaho
- In office January 27, 1940 – November 10, 1945
- Appointed by: C. A. Bottolfsen
- Preceded by: William Borah
- Succeeded by: Charles Gossett
- In office June 30, 1928 – March 3, 1933
- Appointed by: H. C. Baldridge
- Preceded by: Frank Gooding
- Succeeded by: James Pope

Personal details
- Born: John William Thomas; January 4, 1874 Prairie View, Kansas
- Died: November 10, 1945 (aged 71) Washington, D.C.
- Resting place: Elmwood Cemetery; Gooding, Idaho
- Party: Republican
- Spouse(s): Florence Johnson Thomas (1873–1943) (m. 1906–1943, her death)
- Children: 1 daughter: Mary Elizabeth Thomas; Peavey Brooks (1907–2002)
- Education: Central Normal College (KS)
- Profession: Teacher, Banker

John William Thomas (January 4, 1874 – November 10, 1945) was an American politician, a United States senator from Idaho. A Republican, he served for a total of over ten years in two different seats, both times appointed after his predecessor died in office. He won three of the four elections for senator, falling only in the Democratic landslide of 1932, and died in office.

== Early life ==
Born on a farm in northern Kansas near Prairie View in Phillips County, Thomas attended the rural schools and the Central Normal College at Great Bend. He taught school, serving as superintendent of schools of Phillips County in Phillipsburg from 1898 to 1903, and as register of land office at Colby from 1906 to 1909, then moved west to south central Idaho and settled at Gooding, where he engaged in banking and livestock business.

== Political life ==
Thomas was elected mayor of Gooding in 1917 for a two-year term, and was a member of the Republican National Committee from 1925 to 1933.

He was appointed to the U.S. Senate for the first time in 1928 to fill the vacancy caused by the death of his political mentor, Frank Gooding, by Governor H. C. Baldridge. Thomas won the special election later that year to finish the four years of the term, and chaired the Senate Committee on Irrigation and Reclamation from 1929 to 1933. Losing support from the progressives late in the term, he was defeated for re-election in 1932 by Democrat James Pope.

After his 1932 defeat, Thomas resumed his former business pursuits. He was appointed to the Senate again in 1940, this time by Governor C. A. Bottolfsen, to fill the vacancy caused by the death of William Borah, the dean of the Senate. Thomas won another special election to finish the term later that year, and was elected to a full term in 1942, both times defeating Democrat Glen H. Taylor, and died in office three years later.

=== Election results ===
U.S. Senate elections in Idaho (Class II & III): Results 1928–1942
Year	Class	Democrat	Votes	Pct	Republican	Votes	Pct	3rd Party	Party	Votes	Pct
1928 (Note: 1928 and 1940 were special elections to complete the terms of Frank R. Gooding and William Borah, both of whom died in office. Thomas was appointed by the governor on both occasions and was the incumbent.)	III	Chase Clark	53,399	36.7%	John W. Thomas (inc.)	90,922	62.6%	C.J. Lundt	Socialist	1,016	0.7%
1932	III	James Pope	103,020	55.6%	John W. Thomas (inc.)	78,325	42.3%	Earl Oliason	Liberty	3,801	2.1%
1940	II	Glen H. Taylor	110,614	47.0%	John W. Thomas (inc.)	124,535	53.0%				
1942	II	Glen H. Taylor	68,989	48.5%	John W. Thomas (inc.)	73,353	51.5%				

== Family ==
Married in Kansas in 1906, Thomas and his wife Florence (1873–1943) had a daughter, Mary Elizabeth Thomas Peavey Brooks (1907–2002), who became a state senator in the 1960s and was the director of the U.S. Mint in the 1970s. Widowed in 1941, Mary moved her young family to Washington, D.C. after her mother's death in 1943. Three years later, she married C. Wayland Brooks, a U.S. Senator from Illinois who had served with her father. Her son, John Peavey (b. 1933), served for over two decades in the Idaho state senate, switching parties in 1978, and was the Democratic nominee for lieutenant governor in 1994.

== Death ==
Thomas had been in failing health for over a year and died in 1945 at age 71 of a cerebral hemorrhage at George Washington University Hospital in Washington, D.C. His wife Florence had died more than two years earlier, also from a cerebral hemorrhage. They are buried at Elmwood Cemetery in Gooding.

== See also ==
- List of members of the United States Congress who died in office (1900–1949)

== Notes ==
U.S. Senate
Preceded by Frank Gooding	U.S. senator (Class 3) from Idaho; June 30, 1928–March 3, 1933; Served alongside: William Borah	Succeeded by James Pope
Preceded by William Borah	U.S. senator (Class 2) from Idaho; January 27, 1940–November 10, 1945; Served alongside: D. Worth Clark, Glen H. Taylor	Succeeded by Charles Gossett
Party political offices
Preceded by Frank Gooding	Republican Party nominee, U.S. Senator (Class 3) from Idaho; 1928 special (won), 1932 (lost)	Succeeded by Donald Callahan
Preceded by William Borah	Republican Party nominee, U.S. Senator (Class 2) from Idaho; 1940 special (won), 1942 (won)	Succeeded by Henry Dworshak
