= 1938 United States Senate election in Idaho =

- November 8, 1938
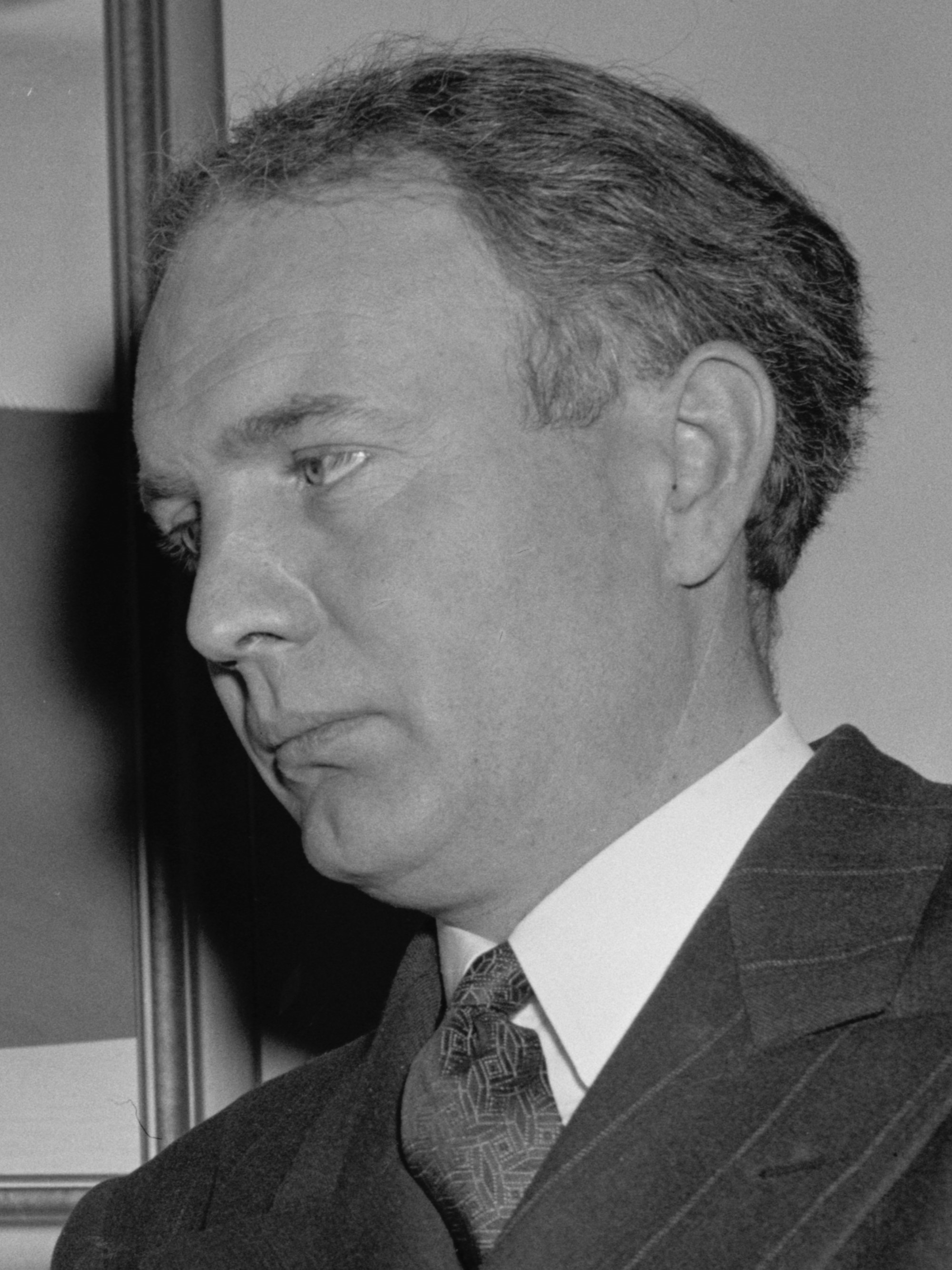
Nominee	D. Worth Clark	Donald A. Callahan
Party	Democratic	Republican
Popular vote	99,801	81,939
Percentage	54.66%	44.88%
- County results Clark: 50–60% 60–70% Callahan: 50–60% 60–70%
U.S. senator before election
James P. Pope
Democratic
Elected U.S. Senator
D. Worth Clark
Democratic

The 1938 United States Senate election in Idaho took place on November 8, 1938. Incumbent Democratic Senator James P. Pope ran for a second term, but was defeated in the Democratic primary by D. Worth Clark, the representative from Idaho's 2nd congressional district. D. Worth Clark won the general election against Donald A. Callahan, a former member of the Idaho State Senate.

== Primary elections ==
Primary elections were held on August 11, 1938.

=== Democratic primary ===
==== Candidates ====
- James P. Pope, incumbent U.S. Senator
- D. Worth Clark, U.S. representative from Idaho's 2nd congressional district (1935-1939)

==== Results ====
Democratic primary results
Party	Candidate	Votes	%
Democratic	D. Worth Clark	43,736	51.78
Democratic	James P. Pope (incumbent)	40,726	48.22
Total votes		84,462	

=== Republican primary ===
==== Candidates ====
- Donald A. Callahan, former member of the Idaho State Senate
- Walter H. Anderson
- Frank H. Adams

==== Results ====
Republican primary results
Party	Candidate	Votes	%
Republican	Donald A. Callahan	16,407	55.78
Republican	Walter H. Anderson	7,235	24.59
Republican	Frank H. Adams	5,774	19.63
Total votes		29,416	

== General election ==
=== Results ===
1938 United States Senate election in Idaho
Party	Candidate	Votes	%
Democratic	D. Worth Clark	99,801	54.66
Republican	Donald A. Callahan	81,939	44.88
National Progressives of America	V. A. Verhei	845	0.46
Majority		17,862	9.78
Turnout		182,585	
Democratic hold			

== See also ==
- 1938 United States Senate elections
