= 1938 Idaho gubernatorial election =

- November 8, 1938
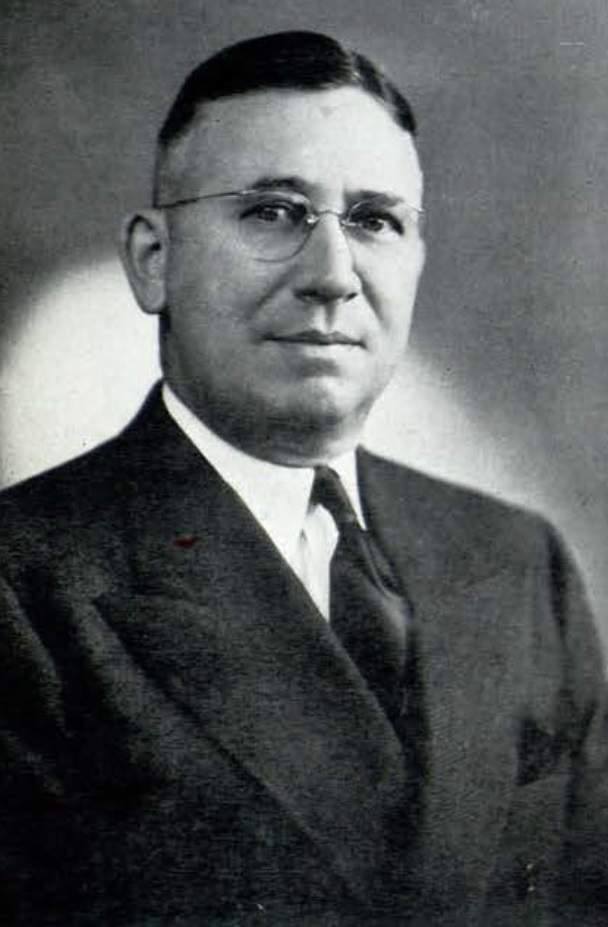

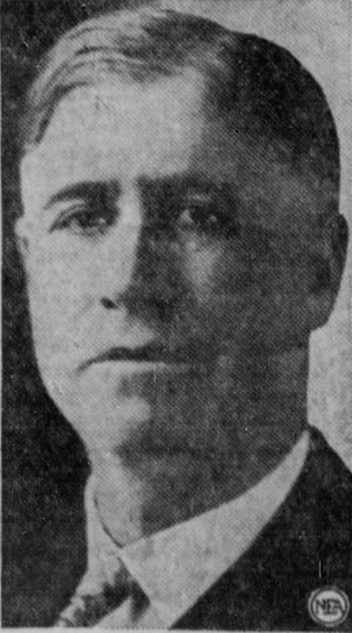
Nominee	C. A. Bottolfsen	C. Ben Ross
Party	Republican	Democratic
Popular vote	106,268	77,697
Percentage	57.30%	41.89%
- County results Bottolfsen: 50–60% 60–70% 70–80% Ross: 40–50% 50–60% 60–70%
Governor before election
Barzilla Clark
Democratic
Elected Governor
C. A. Bottolfsen
Republican

The 1938 Idaho gubernatorial election was held on November 8. Incumbent Democratic governor Barzilla Clark ran for re-election, but was defeated in the August primary by former three-term governor C. Ben Ross. The general election was won by Republican nominee C. A. Bottolfsen, who received 57.30% of the vote.

== Primary elections ==
Primary elections were held on August 9, 1938.

=== Democratic primary ===
==== Candidates ====
- C. Ben Ross, Parma, former governor (three terms)
- Barzilla Clark, Idaho Falls, incumbent governor
- Charles Gossett, Nampa, lieutenant governor
- W. P. Whitaker, Pocatello

=== Republican primary ===
==== Candidates ====
- C. A. Bottolfsen, Arco newspaper publisher
- R. H. Young, Parma farmer

== General election ==
=== Candidates ===
Major party candidates

- C. A. Bottolfsen, Republican
- C. Ben Ross, Democratic

Other candidates

- R. B. Wilson, Independent

=== Results ===
1938 Idaho gubernatorial election
Party	Candidate	Votes	%	±%
Republican	C. A. Bottolfsen	106,268	57.30%	
Democratic	C. Ben Ross	77,697	41.89%	
Independent	R. B. Wilson	1,494	0.81%	
Majority		28,571		
Turnout				
Republican gain from Democratic		Swing		
