= 1928 United States Senate special election in Idaho =

1928 United States Senate election in Idaho
- November 6, 1928
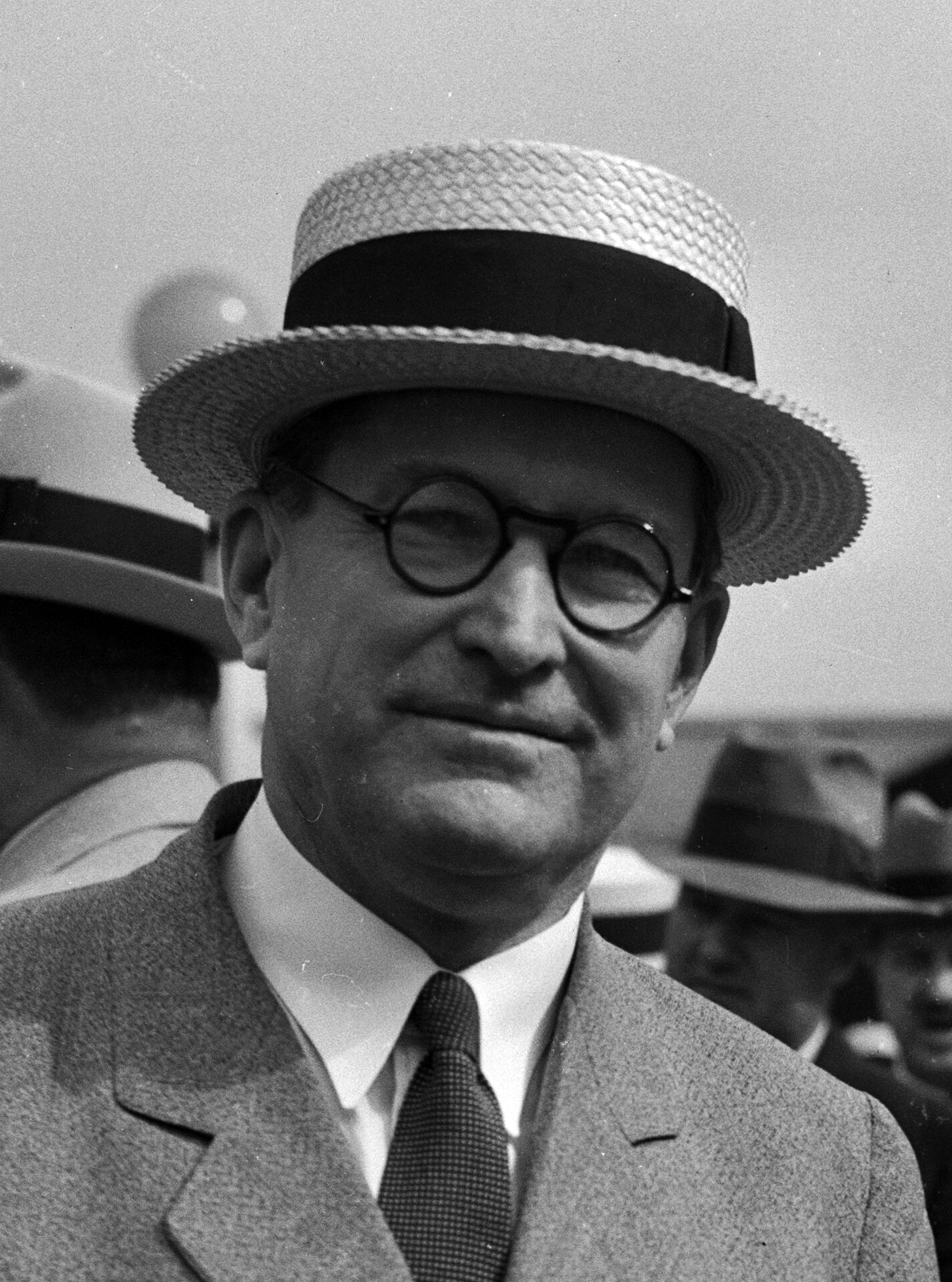

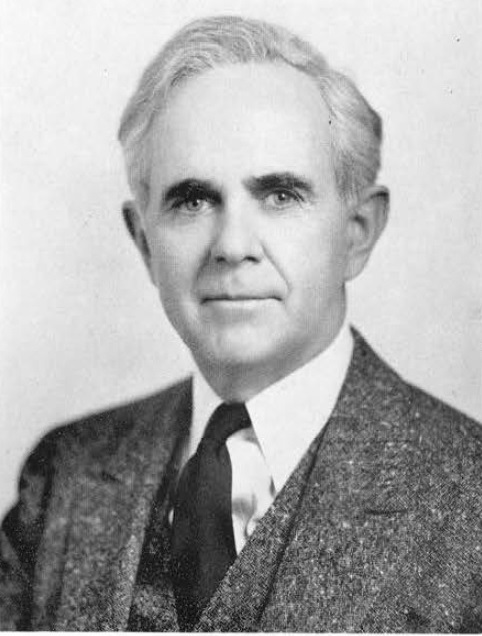
Nominee	John Thomas	Chase Clark
Party	Republican	Democratic
Popular vote	90,922	53,399
Percentage	62.56%	36.74%
- County results Thomas: 50–60% 60–70% 70–80% Clark: 50–60% 60–70%
U.S. senator before election
John Thomas
Republican
Elected U.S. Senator
John Thomas
Republican

The 1928 United States Senate special election in Idaho took place on November 6, 1928. Incumbent Republican Senator John Thomas, who was appointed by Governor H. C. Baldridge after the death of Frank R. Gooding, won a partial term, defeating Chase Clark, a former member of the Idaho House of Representatives and future Governor of Idaho.

== Primary elections ==
No primaries happened in this election. From 1920 to 1930, Idaho decided on its candidates with party conventions, not primaries.

=== Democratic convention ===
==== Candidates ====
- Chase Clark, former member of the Idaho House of Representatives (1913-1916)

=== Republican convention ===
==== Candidates ====
- John Thomas, appointed incumbent U.S. Senator

== General election ==
=== Results ===
1928 United States Senate special election in Idaho
Party	Candidate	Votes	%
Republican	John Thomas (incumbent)	90,922	62.56
Democratic	Chase Clark	53,399	36.74
Socialist	C. J. Lundt	1,016	0.70
Majority		37,523	25.82
Turnout		145,337	
Republican hold			

== See also ==
- 1928 United States Senate elections
