= James P. Pope =

American politician (1884–1966)

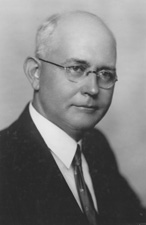
- In office March 4, 1933 – January 3, 1939
- Preceded by: John Thomas
- Succeeded by: D. Worth Clark

Mayor of Boise
- In office April 30, 1929 – February 13, 1933
- Preceded by: Walter F. Hansen
- Succeeded by: Ross Cady

Personal details
- Born: James Pinckney Pope; March 31, 1884 Jonesboro, Louisiana
- Died: January 23, 1966 (aged 81) Alexandria, Virginia
- Resting place: Lynnhurst Cemetery; Knoxville, Tennessee.
- Party: Democratic
- Spouse(s): Pauline Ruth Horn (1887–1957)
- Children: 2 sons
- Education: Louisiana Industrial; Institute, 1906; University of Chicago, J.D., 1909
- Profession: Attorney

James Pinckney Pope (March 31, 1884 – January 23, 1966) was a Democratic politician from Idaho. He was mayor of Boise for four years and a one-term United States Senator, serving from 1933 to 1939.

== Early life and career ==
Born in Jonesboro, Louisiana, Pope graduated from Louisiana Industrial Institute (now Louisiana Tech University) in Ruston in 1906 and from the University of Chicago Law School in 1909 where he became a member of the Delta Chi fraternity. He was admitted to the bar then moved west to Idaho to practice law in Boise, and served as city attorney, assistant attorney general of Idaho, and a member of the board of education of Boise. Pope was mayor of Boise from 1929 to 1933.

== United States Senate ==
He was elected as a Democrat to the United States Senate in 1932, defeating Republican incumbent John Thomas of Gooding. From 1934-36, Pope was a member of the Nye Committee. In 1938, he was defeated for renomination in the Democratic primary by Congressman D. Worth Clark of Pocatello, who went on to win the general election.

Pope was a stalwart of the Roosevelt administration and the New Deal, and it was suggested that Idaho's senior senator William Borah, the dean of the U.S. Senate, felt upstaged at times and had a hand in Pope's loss to the more conservative Clark in the August primary.

U.S. Senate elections in Idaho (Class III): Results 1932
Year	Democrat	Votes	Pct	Republican	Votes	Pct	3rd Party	Party	Votes	Pct
1932	James P. Pope	103,020	55.6%	John Thomas	78,325	42.3%	Earl A. Oliason	Liberty	3,801	2.1%

== After Congress ==
In 1939, Pope was appointed a director of the Tennessee Valley Authority by President Roosevelt and served in that capacity until 1951. He continued to practice law and serve on several boards in Tennessee after that.

Pope relocated to Alexandria, Virginia, in 1963 and died there at age 81 in 1966. He and his wife, Pauline Ruth Horn Pope (1887–1957), are buried in Lynnhurst Cemetery in Knoxville, Tennessee. They had two sons, Ross P. Pope and George A. Pope.

Political offices
Preceded by Walter F. Hansen	Mayor of Boise, Idaho; 1929–1933	Succeeded by Ross Cady
Party political offices
Preceded by Chase A. Clark	Democratic Party nominee, U.S. Senator (Class 3) from Idaho; 1932 (won)	Succeeded by D. Worth Clark
U.S. Senate
Preceded by John Thomas	U.S. senator (Class 3) from Idaho; March 4, 1933–January 3, 1939; Served alongside: William E. Borah	Succeeded by D. Worth Clark
