= Chase Clark =

American judge (1883–1966)

Chase A. Clark
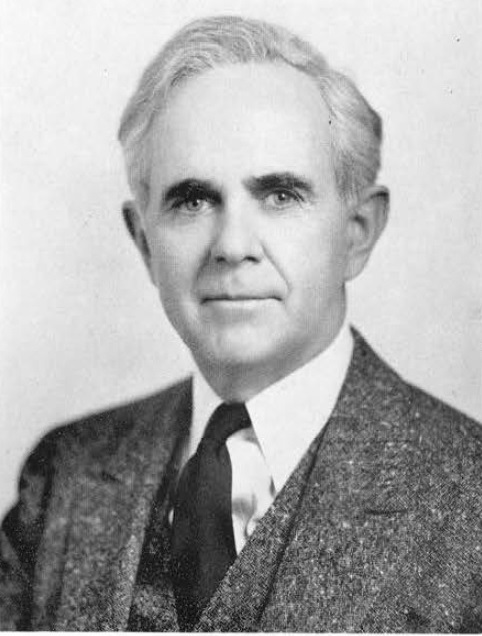
- From 1942's Les Bois, the yearbook of Boise Junior College

Senior Judge of the United States District Court for the District of Idaho
- In office April 30, 1964 – December 30, 1966

Chief Judge of the United States District Court for the District of Idaho
- In office 1954–1964
- Preceded by: Office established
- Succeeded by: Fredrick Monroe Taylor

Judge of the United States District Court for the District of Idaho
- In office March 10, 1943 – April 30, 1964
- Appointed by: Franklin D. Roosevelt
- Preceded by: Charles Cheatham Cavanah
- Succeeded by: Raymond Clyne McNichols

18th Governor of Idaho
- In office January 6, 1941 – January 4, 1943
- Lieutenant: Charles C. Gossett
- Preceded by: C. A. Bottolfsen
- Succeeded by: C. A. Bottolfsen

Personal details
- Born: Chase Addison Clark; August 20, 1883 Hadley, Indiana
- Died: December 30, 1966 (aged 83) Boise, Idaho
- Resting place: Rose Hill Cemetery; Idaho Falls, Idaho
- Party: Democratic
- Spouse: Jean Elizabeth Burnett (m. 1906)
- Children: Bethine Clark Church
- Education: University of Michigan Law School read law

Chase Addison Clark (August 21, 1883 – December 30, 1966) was an American jurist who served as the 18th governor of Idaho and was a United States district judge of the United States District Court for the District of Idaho.

== Education and career ==
Clark was born on August 21, 1883, in Hadley, Indiana, the son of Eunice (Hadley) and Joseph Addison Clark. He arrived in eastern Idaho Territory in 1884. His father engineered an early canal on the Snake River and later became the first Mayor of Idaho Falls, Idaho in 1900. Clark attended the public schools and left Idaho Falls High School at age 15 and then attended school in Terre Haute, Indiana. Clark returned to Idaho Falls working as a mercantile clerk, then moved to Mackay, Idaho shortly after its founding and saved money to attend the University of Michigan Law School, but did not graduate but instead read law to enter the bar in 1904. He entered private practice in Mackay from 1904 to 1930. He was a Judge Advocate General for the State of Idaho from 1914 to 1915. Clark left to fight in 1916 in the Border War and then World War I. He served in a machine gun unit and achieved the rank of lieutenant in the United States Army. He was a member of the Idaho House of Representatives from 1913 to 1916. He returned to private practice in Idaho Falls from 1930 to 1940. He was the Mayor of Idaho Falls from 1937 to 1938. He was the Governor of Idaho from 1941 to 1942.

=== Gubernatorial service ===
Clark was elected Governor as a Democrat in 1940, defeating the Republican incumbent, C. A. Bottolfsen.

At an April 1942 War Relocation Administration conference at Salt Lake City to discuss using Japanese-American internees to help with the farm labor shortage, Governor Clark "went so far as to ask that both Issei and Nisei already residing freely in his state be rounded up and placed under supervision." These citizens of Idaho were not covered by the U.S. Government's order forcefully removing people of Japanese descent from the West Coast. Speaking of the internment of Japanese Americans in May 1942, months after the Pearl Harbor bombing, Clark spoke in a Lions Club meeting stated "Japs live like rats, breed like rats and act like rats. We don't want them ... permanently located in our state."

As the governorship was a two-year term, Bottolfsen then defeated Clark to regain the governorship in 1942; both elections had been very close.

Idaho Gubernatorial Elections: Results 1940, 1942
Year	Democrat	Votes	Pct	Republican	Votes	Pct
1940	Chase Clark	120,420	50.48%	C. A. Bottolfsen (inc.)	118,117	49.52%
1942	Chase Clark (inc.)	71,826	49.85%	C. A. Bottolfsen	72,260	50.15%

== Federal judicial service ==
Clark was nominated by President Franklin D. Roosevelt on February 18, 1943, to a seat on the United States District Court for the District of Idaho vacated by Judge Charles Cheatham Cavanah. He was confirmed by the United States Senate on March 5, 1943, and received his commission on March 10, 1943. He served as Chief Judge from 1954 to 1964. He assumed senior status on April 30, 1964. His service terminated on December 30, 1966, due to his death.

== Family ==
Clark married Jean Elizabeth Burnett, the 18-year-old daughter of a Mackay merchant, on January 10, 1906.

== Death ==
Clark suffered a stroke at age 83 in December 1966, and spent his final weeks at St. Luke's Hospital in Boise, Idaho. He died on December 30, and was interred at Rose Hill Cemetery in Idaho Falls.

== See also ==
- List of mayors of Idaho Falls

Party political offices
Preceded by John F. Nugent	Democratic Party nominee, United States Senator (Class 3) from Idaho; 1928 special (lost)	Succeeded by James P. Pope
Preceded by C. Ben Ross	Democratic Party nominee, Governor of Idaho; 1940 (won), 1942 (lost)	Succeeded by Charles C. Gossett
Political offices
Preceded by C. A. Bottolfsen	Governor of Idaho; 1941–1943	Succeeded by C. A. Bottolfsen
Legal offices
Preceded by Charles Cheatham Cavanah	Judge of the United States District Court for the District of Idaho; 1943–1964	Succeeded by Raymond Clyne McNichols
Preceded by Office established	Chief Judge of the United States District Court for the District of Idaho; 1954–1964	Succeeded by Fredrick Monroe Taylor
