= Glen H. Taylor =

American politician (1904–1984)

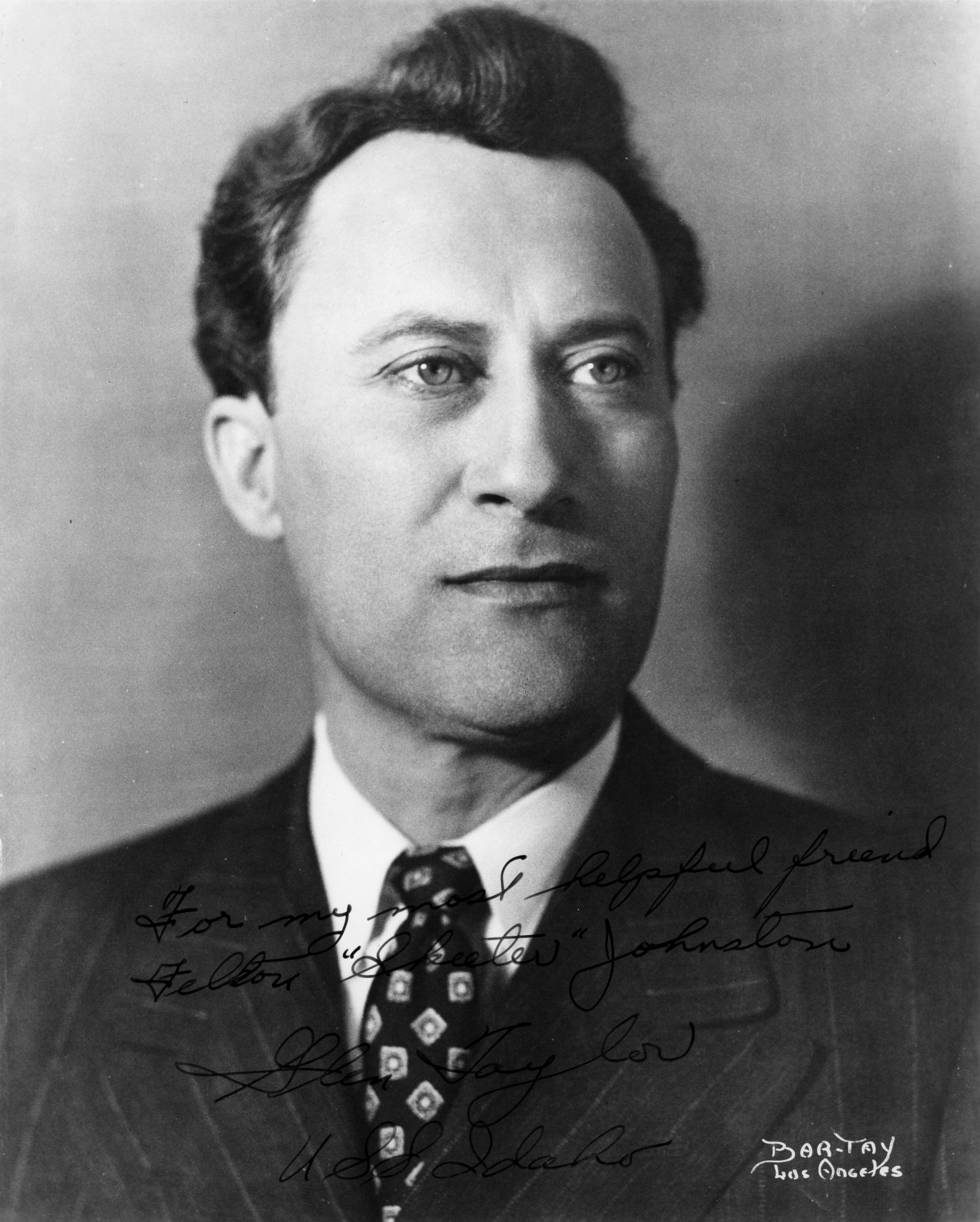
- Portrait by Bar-Tay c. 1945–1951

United States Senator from Idaho
- In office January 3, 1945 – January 3, 1951
- Preceded by: D. Worth Clark
- Succeeded by: Herman Welker

Personal details
- Born: Glen Hearst Taylor; April 12, 1904 Portland, Oregon, U.S.
- Died: April 28, 1984 (aged 80) Burlingame, California, U.S.
- Resting place: Skylawn Memorial Park; San Mateo, California, U.S.
- Party: Democratic (before 1948, 1950–1984)
- Other political affiliations: Progressive (1948–1949) Independent (1956) (Note: Ran as an independent in the 1956 United States Senate election in Idaho.)
- Children: 3
- Relatives: Lee Morse (sister)

Glen Hearst Taylor (April 12, 1904 – April 28, 1984) was an American politician, entertainer, businessman, and U.S. senator from Idaho.

He was the vice presidential candidate on the Progressive Party ticket in the 1948 election. Taylor was otherwise a member of the Democratic Party. By one measure, Taylor was the second-most liberal member of the U.S. Senate, trailing only Wayne Morse of Oregon, and the fourth-most liberal member of Congress overall between 1937 and 2002.

== Early life ==
Born in a boarding house in Portland, Oregon, Taylor was the twelfth of thirteen children of Pleasant John Taylor and Olive Higgins Taylor. His father was a retired Texas ranger and wandering preacher, and the family was with him in Portland for a protracted soul-saving meeting.

The family homesteaded in North Central Idaho, near Kooskia, and Taylor attended the public schools. In 1919, after completing eighth grade, he joined his older brother's stock theater company, and between 1926 and 1944, he became the owner and manager of various entertainment enterprises. Taylor was also a country-western singer; his older sister, Lena, became famous as a jazz singer under the name Lee Morse in the 1920s.

Taylor was inspired to run for political office by King Camp Gillette's book The People's Corporation and Stuart Chase's 1932 book A New Deal. In 1935 Taylor unsuccessfully attempted to organize a Farmer–Labor Party in Nevada and Montana.

== Career ==
By the late 1930s, Taylor had settled in eastern Idaho at Pocatello. His first political campaign was in 1938 for an open seat in the United States House of Representatives from the second district, but he finished a distant fourth in the Democratic primary.

Taylor first ran for the United States Senate in 1940 in a special election to fill the remaining term of the late William Borah, but lost to appointee John Thomas, with 47.1 to 52.9 percent. Despite being labeled as "semi-socialistic" and "communistic," he ran again in 1942 against Thomas and lost a closer race, 48.5 to 51.5 percent. Taylor lost both elections to Thomas because of stiff opposition from state Democratic Party leaders. Between elections, Taylor supported himself as a painter's assistant and sheet metal worker in California.

In his third try for the Senate, Taylor ran for the other Idaho seat in 1944, narrowly defeating conservative incumbent D. Worth Clark in the Democratic primary, and Governor C. A. Bottolfsen in the general election. Taylor, the first professional actor ever elected to Congress, had never been east of Chicago prior to his election.

In the Senate, Taylor, known as "The Singing Cowboy," acquired a reputation for eccentric behavior. Upon his arrival in Washington, D.C., Taylor rode his horse, Nugget, up the steps of the U.S. Capitol building. Nugget also accompanied Taylor during a 1947 tour of the country highlighting his antiwar activism and opposition to U.S. foreign policy of the time.

When Taylor moved to Washington in preparation to be sworn in in January 1945, the housing shortage caused by World War II was still in full swing and so he and his family had a difficult time finding a place to live. In response, Taylor, a musician and songwriter, stood outside the US Capitol building and sang, "O give us a home, near the Capitol dome, with a yard for two children to play ..." to the tune of "Home on the Range". He and his family were offered several places to rent.

Taylor was appointed to the Committee on Banking and Currency after telling Senator Robert F. Wagner of New York that he was qualified for the post because he had been a depositor with several banks. In October 1945, Taylor submitted a resolution to the Senate "favoring the creation of a world republic." Taylor supported legislation favored by Truman 92% of the time between 1945 and 1947, but disagreed with him on foreign policy.

In July 1946, at a convention of the National Lawyers Guild in Cleveland, Senator Taylor said:

Success of monopolies in dealing with the present Congress is evident in the wrecking of price control, profit-guaranteeing tax rebates, blocking of power projects in the Columbia and Missouri Valleys, pigeonholing of the minimum wage bill and in the emasculation of the 1944 Kilgore Reconversion Bill and the 1945 Murray Full-Employment Bill.
Monopolies have so influenced our foreign policy that it serves monopoly and monopolistic aims.

On election night in 1946, Taylor made national headlines by allegedly breaking the jaw of local Republican leader Ray McKaig in a hotel lobby in Boise. Taylor claimed that McKaig had called him an obscene name, and struck him first with a punch that broke his nose, but McKaig denied those claims. McKaig, 66, claimed that while he was lying on the floor Taylor proceeded to kick him in the face, but Taylor denied that claim. When Taylor lost his reelection bid in the 1950 primary, McKaig sent a telegram that said, "You may have broken my jaw, but I just broke your back!!!"

Taylor also feuded with other Idaho Democrats, often making critical remarks about Charles C. Gossett, who resigned as governor in November 1945 to have his successor appoint him to the vacant Senate seat. During the 1946 Democratic primary in June, Taylor openly supported Gossett's opponent, George E. Donart, calling the appointed incumbent Gossett a "conservative" who "hobnobbed" with Republicans in Congress.

In the Senate, Taylor became noted for lengthy speeches that were often critical of President Harry S. Truman's policies, particularly in foreign affairs. He was particularly critical of the Truman Doctrine and the Marshall Plan, both of which he believed brought the United States closer to war with the Soviet Union. Taylor was decidedly less critical of the Soviet Union than most of his Senate colleagues, once noting that there was no need to criticize Soviet policy when there were 90 other senators willing to do it every day.

=== Civil rights activism ===
Southern Negro Youth Congress delegation meets Senator Taylor, center

Taylor was an early proponent of the Civil Rights Movement and, as senator, openly opposed supporters and policies of racial segregation. He advocated for racial equality, and an immediate end to Jim Crow discrimination in arenas such as jobs, housing, voting, and the courts. In 1946, he pushed his way onto the Senate floor to interrupt and oppose Southern senators filibustering against making the anti-discrimination Fair Employment Practices Committee permanent, as it only ensured non-discrimination in government funded defense jobs during World War II. In January 1947, Taylor requested for the Senate to delay the swearing-in of Mississippi Senator Theodore G. Bilbo, who had been re-elected in 1946, pending investigation of charges against Bilbo for corruption and civil rights violations. As a result, Bilbo, well known for his segregationist, racially-charged rhetoric, was never formally seated for his final Senate term. The impasse was not completely resolved until Bilbo's death in August 1947.

Taylor was arrested on May 1, 1948, in Birmingham, Alabama, by Police Commissioner Eugene "Bull" Connor, for attempting to use a door reserved for African Americans, rather than the whites-only door, while Taylor was attempting to attend a meeting of the Southern Negro Youth Congress. He was later convicted of disorderly conduct. He appealed his conviction to the Court of Appeals of Alabama (part of which became the Alabama Court of Criminal Appeals in 1969), but lost the appeal. When Taylor refused to return to Alabama to serve a 180-day sentence of hard labor, Idaho Governor C. A. Robins declined to extradite him.

=== Roswell comments ===
In July 1947, Taylor was asked by a United Press reporter what he thought about reports that remnants of a UFO had been found by the Air Force near Roswell, New Mexico. Taylor replied that he almost hoped flying saucers would turn out to be spaceships from another planet: "They could end our petty arguments on earth." He went on to say that no matter what the UFOs turned out to be, they "can't be laughed off."

"Even if it is only a psychological phenomenon, it is a sign of what the world is coming to," Taylor explained. "If we don't ease the tensions, the whole world will be full of psychological cases and eventually turn into a global nuthouse."

=== 1948 vice presidential nomination ===
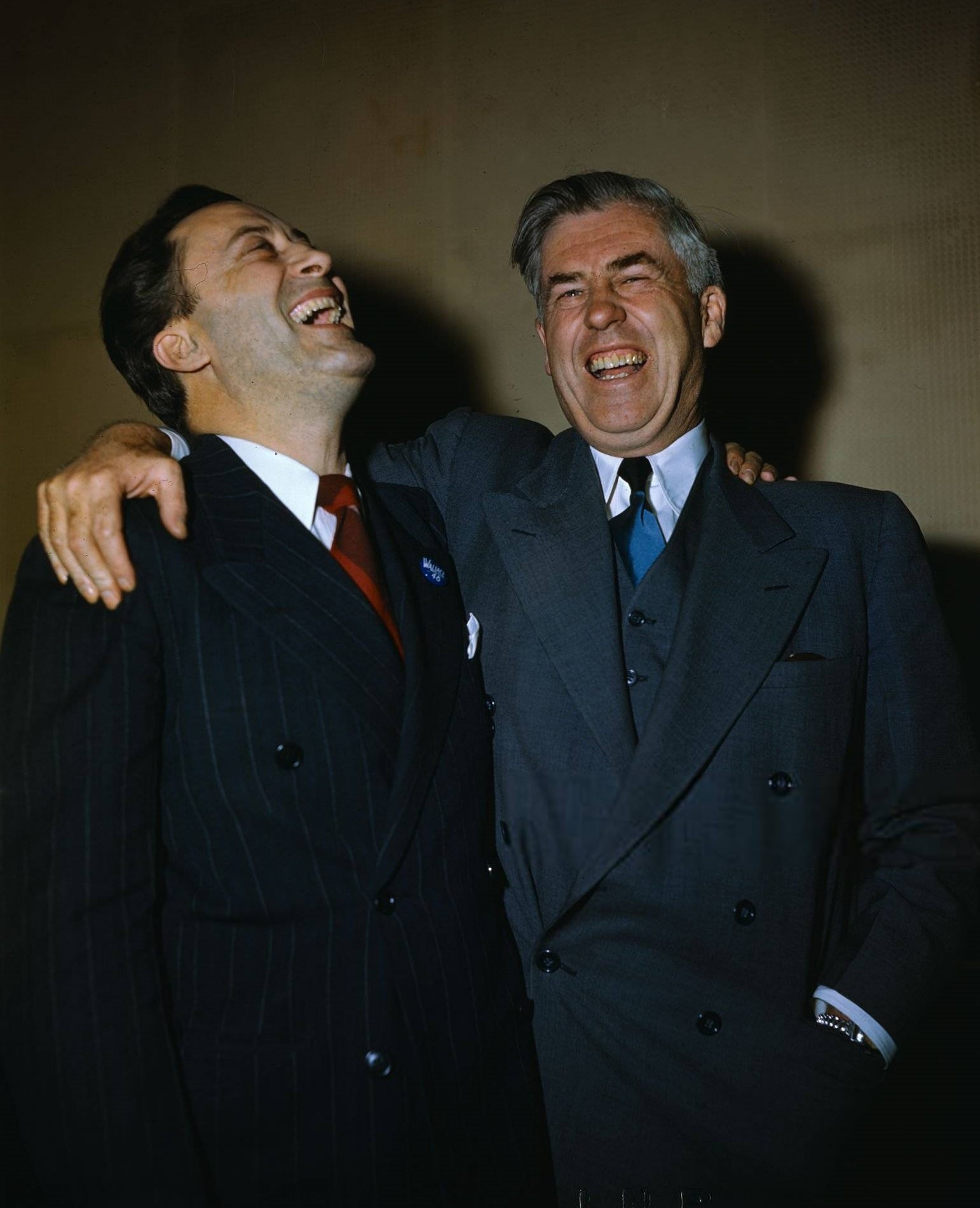
Taylor with Henry Wallace in 1948

In 1948 Taylor was chosen as the vice presidential candidate on the Progressive ticket headed by former Vice President Henry A. Wallace of Iowa. Taylor agreed to be the nominee despite accurately foreseeing that this step meant he would be heavily defeated in his next Senate campaign. The unabashedly leftist Wallace/Taylor ticket failed to carry any states and won only 2.4 percent of the nationwide popular vote. The nomination prompted an effort by conservatives within the Idaho Democratic Party to expel him from its ranks, but was defeated.

=== 1950 reelection run ===
In 1950, former Senator David Worth Clark sought to regain his Senate seat from Taylor, whose run on the Progressive ticket earned him a reputation as an "incorrigible leftist" in Idaho. It contributed to Taylor's primary defeat by Clark, who in turn lost in the general election to conservative Republican Herman Welker.

=== Election results ===
U.S. Senate elections in Idaho (Class II & III): Results 1940–1956
Year	Class	Democrat	Votes	Pct	Republican	Votes	Pct	3rd Party	Party	Votes	Pct
1940	II	Glen H. Taylor	110,614	47.0%	John Thomas (inc.)	124,535	53.0%				
1942	II	Glen H. Taylor	68,989	48.5%	John Thomas (inc.)	73,353	51.5%				
1944	III	Glen H. Taylor	107,096	51.1%	C. A. Bottolfsen	102,373	48.9%				
1954	II	Glen H. Taylor	84,139	37.2%	Henry Dworshak (inc.)	142,269	62.8%				
1956	III	Frank Church	149,096	56.2%	Herman Welker (inc.)	102,781	38.7%	Glen H. Taylor	Write-In	13,415	5.1%

- 1940 was a special election (November) to complete the final two years of the term vacated by the death of William Borah on January 19, 1940. Thomas, a former U.S. senator (1928–1933), was appointed to the seat by Governor C. A. Bottolfsen on January 27.

== Later career ==
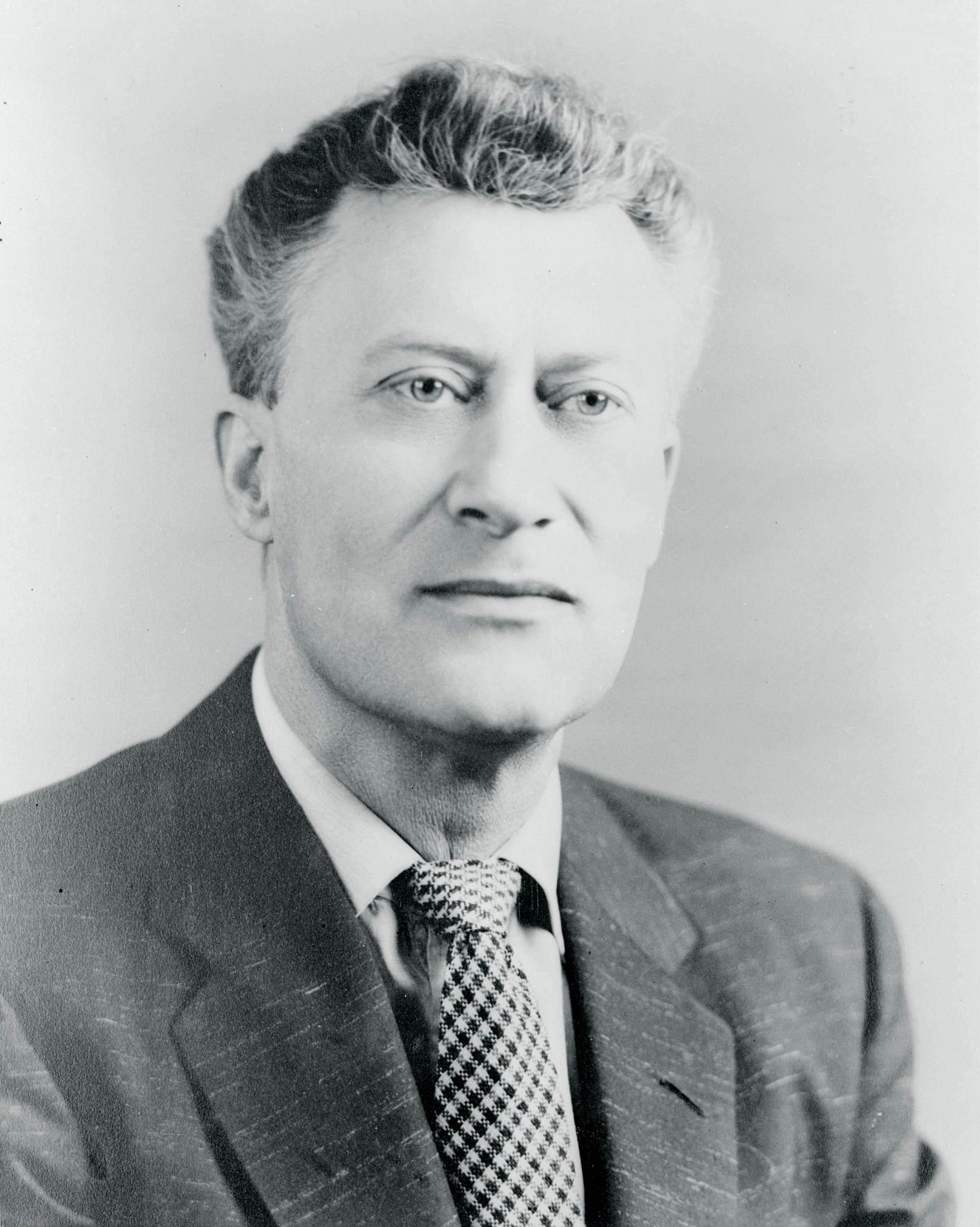
Campaign portrait, 1954

Taylor served as president of Coryell Construction Company from 1950 to 1952 but was forced to resign after being labeled a "security risk," jeopardizing a government contract. Afterwards, he was often forced to work manual labor construction jobs. He ran again for the Senate in 1954 but was decisively beaten by Republican incumbent Henry Dworshak, winning only 37.2 percent of the vote. His sixth and final Senate attempt came in 1956; he narrowly lost the Democratic primary to 32-year-old lawyer Frank Church, and then got 5.1 percent of the vote in the general election as a write-in candidate. In March 1958, Taylor proposed that Church take a lie detector test about fraud in the 1956 primary.

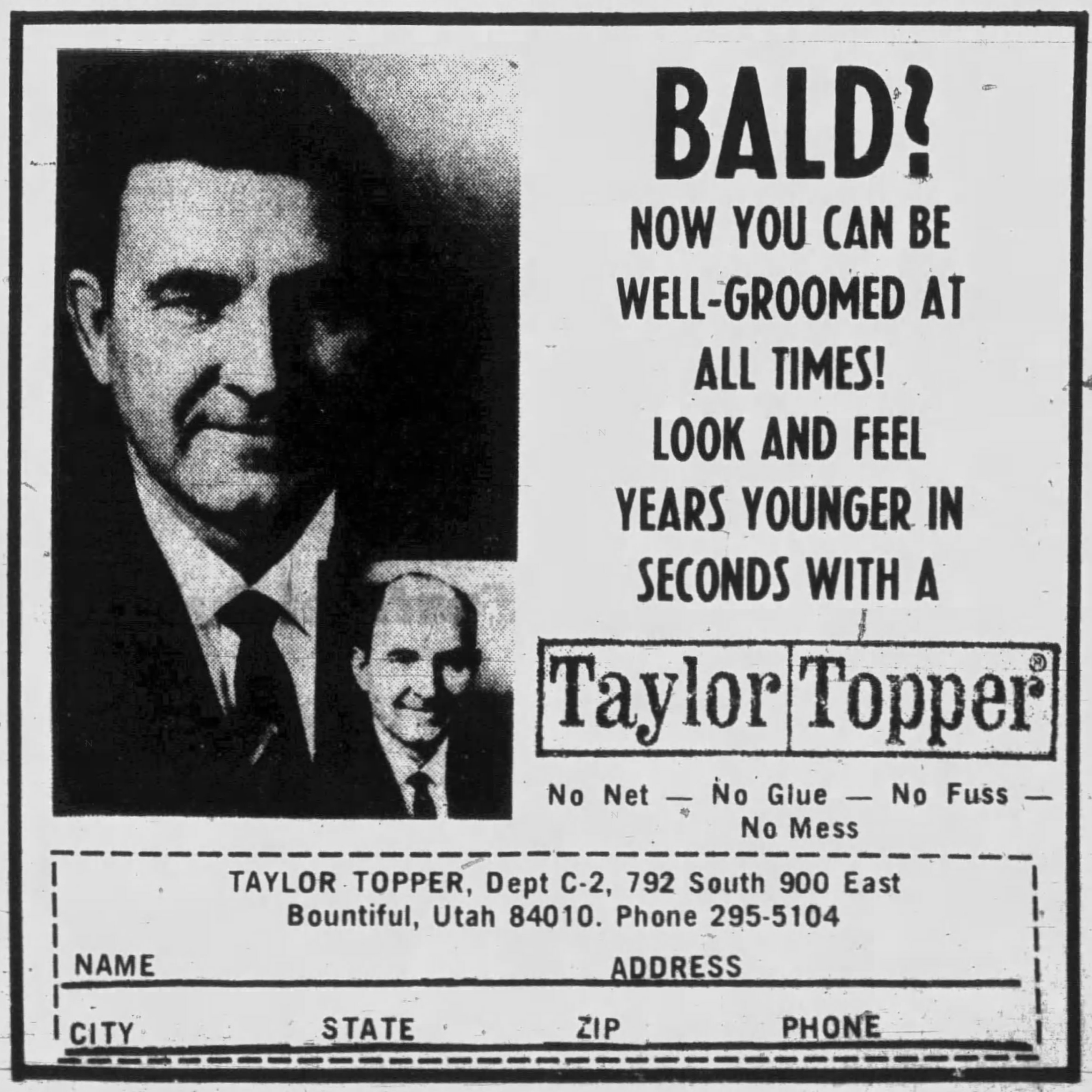
Taylor Topper newspaper advertisement, 1971

In 1958, Taylor and his wife Dora moved to Millbrae, California, and began making hairpieces by hand based on one Taylor had made for himself in the early 1940s. By 1960, Taylor Topper Inc. had become the major manufacturer of hair replacements in the United States. Taylor told The Washington Post in 1978 that he was very familiar with them: "I was 18, a juvenile leading man in a traveling show, and my hair had begun to fall out. There isn't much demand for bald juvenile leading men, and I tried everything – sheep dip, what have you – and that just made it fall out faster."

Taylor explained that he had run for public office without the hairpiece and found that voters "didn't have much use for bald politicians" but that "I ran the fourth time with it and won." His original toupée was made from a tin pie plate, which he lined with pink felt, then pulled human hair through. In 1958, he was granted a patent (#2,850,023) for his innovative product. Glen and Dora Taylor were successful at manufacturing hairpieces, and Taylor Toppers became famous. The company, now known as Taylormade Hair Replacement, is still active in Millbrae.

== Personal life ==
Glen and Dora Taylor had three sons between 1935 and 1946, Glen Arod (Dora spelled backward) and then Paul Jon and Greg.

Taylor died at 80 in April 1984 from complications from Alzheimer's disease; Dora Taylor remained in the San Mateo County area until her death at 93 in 1997. They are interred at Skylawn Memorial Park in San Mateo.

== Filmography ==
=== Television ===
Year	Title	Role	Notes
1958–1961	The Adventures of Ozzie and Harriet	Professor / Professor Higgins / Mr. Asher	9 episodes
1959	Goodyear Theatre	N/A	Episode: "A Good Name"
1960	Death Valley Days	Colonel Adrian	Episode: "Yankee Confederate"

== Works cited ==
- Schmidt, Karl (1960). Henry A. Wallace: Quixotic Crusade 1948. Syracuse University Press.

Party political offices
Preceded by C. Ben Ross	Democratic Party nominee, U.S. Senator (Class 2) from Idaho; 1940 special (lost), 1942 (lost)	Succeeded by George E. Donart
Preceded by D. Worth Clark	Democratic Party nominee, U.S. Senator (Class 3) from Idaho; 1944 (won)	Succeeded by D. Worth Clark
Preceded by none	Progressive Party nominee for Vice President of the United States; 1948	Succeeded by Charlotta Bass
Preceded by Claude J. Burtenshaw	Democratic Party nominee, U.S. Senator (Class 2) from Idaho; 1954 (lost)	Succeeded by R. F. (Bob) McLaughlin
U.S. Senate
Preceded by D. Worth Clark	U.S. senator (Class 3) from Idaho; January 3, 1945 – January 3, 1951; Served alongside: John Thomas, Charles C. Gossett, Henry Dworshak, Bert H. Miller, Henry Dworshak	Succeeded by Herman Welker
