= C. A. Bottolfsen =

American politician (1890–1964)

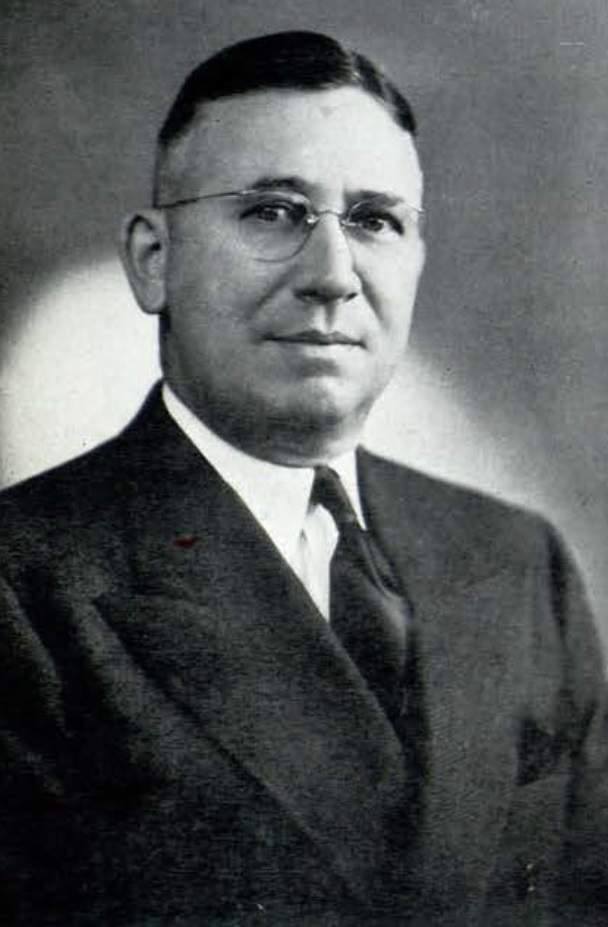
- Frontispiece of 1940's Les Bois, the yearbook of Boise Junior College

17th & 19th Governor of Idaho
- In office January 2, 1939 – January 5, 1941
- Lieutenant: Donald Whitehead
- Preceded by: Barzilla Clark
- Succeeded by: Chase A. Clark
- In office January 4, 1943 – January 1, 1945
- Lieutenant: Edwin Nelson
- Preceded by: Chase A. Clark
- Succeeded by: Charles Gossett

Speaker of the Idaho House of Representatives
- In office 1931
- Preceded by: Donald S. Whitehead
- Succeeded by: Robert Coulter

Member of the Idaho House of Representatives
- In office 1921–1931

Personal details
- Born: Clarence Alfred Bottolfsen; October 10, 1891 Superior, Wisconsin, US
- Died: July 18, 1964 (aged 72) Boise, Idaho, US
- Resting place: Hillcrest Cemetery, Arco, Idaho, US
- Party: Republican
- Spouse: Elizabeth Hanna Bottolfsen (m.1912–1964, his death)
- Profession: Newspaper publisher

Military service
- Allegiance: United States
- Branch/service: U.S. Army
- Years of service: 1918–1919

Clarence Alfred Bottolfsen (October 10, 1890 – July 18, 1964) was an American publisher and politician from Idaho, a member of the Idaho Republican Party. He served as the state's 17th and 19th governor, from 1939 to 1941 and again from 1943 to 1945.

== Early years ==
Born on October 10, 1890, in Superior, Wisconsin, Bottolfsen moved with his family to Fessenden, North Dakota, in 1902 where he was educated in the public schools. While in high school, he worked as a printer's devil (an apprentice or errand boy) in a local printing shop. In 1910, the owner of the shop moved to Arco, Idaho, purchased the Arco Advertiser, and sent for Bottolfsen, then nineteen, to manage it. He purchased the paper and continued to be the publisher in Arco until 1949. He married Elizabeth Hanna on August 27, 1912.

== Career ==
Bottolfsen entered the U.S. Army on June 27, 1918, and served until four months after the Armistice and was discharged in March 1919. After the War, he took a leading part in the organization of the American Legion and served as State Commander in 1934.

Bottolfsen served in the Idaho House of Representatives beginning in 1921; he was reelected in 1922, 1926, 1928 and 1930. From 1925 to 1927, he was the House's chief clerk, speaker in 1931, and start party chairman from 1936 to 1938. He was the first of two in Idaho history to serve non-consecutive terms as governor (Cecil Andrus).

Early in his first term in 1939, Bottolfsen signed the bill creating the Idaho State Police.

Idaho Gubernatorial Elections: Results
Year	Democrat	Votes	Pct	Republican	Votes	Pct
1938	C. Ben Ross	77,697	41.89%	C. A. Bottolfsen	106,268	57.30%
1940	Chase Clark	120,420	50.48%	C. A. Bottolfsen (inc.)	118,117	49.52%
1942	Chase Clark (inc.)	71,826	49.85%	C. A. Bottolfsen	72,260	50.15%

While governor in 1944, Bottolfsen was the Republican nominee for the United States Senate, but was defeated by Democrat Glen Taylor in the general election.

U.S. Senate elections in Idaho (Class II & III): Results
Year	Class	Democrat	Votes	Pct	Republican	Votes	Pct
1944	III	Glen Taylor	107,096	51.1%	C. A. Bottolfsen	102,373	48.9%

He ran for another term as governor in 1946, but lost to C. A. Robins in the June primary.

In his later years, Bottolfsen served as chief clerk of the Idaho House and on the staff of U.S. Senator Herman Welker. He was elected to the state senate in 1958 and 1960, but declined to seek reelection in 1962 due to poor health.

== Death and legacy ==
Bottolfsen was an active Freemason within the Grand Lodge of Idaho, serving as master of Arco Lodge No. 48. He was also active with the El Korah Shrine in Boise, the Rotary Club, and the Arco Chamber of Commerce.

Bottolfsen died on July 18, 1964, aged 72, in Boise, Idaho, from complications from emphysema, which he suffered from in his final years. Bottolfsen Park in Arco is named after him. His papers are contained within the University of Idaho Library in Moscow, and he and his wife are interred at Hillcrest Cemetery in Arco.

Political offices
Preceded by Barzilla W. Clark	Governor of Idaho; January 1, 1939 – January 6, 1941	Succeeded by Chase A. Clark
Preceded by Chase A. Clark	Governor of Idaho; January 4, 1943 – January 1, 1945	Succeeded by Charles C. Gossett
Party political offices
Preceded by Frank L. Stephan	Republican nominee for Governor of Idaho; 1938, 1940, 1942	Succeeded by W. H. Detweiler
Preceded by Donald A. Callahan	Republican Party nominee, U.S. Senator (Class 3) from Idaho; 1944 (lost)	Succeeded by Herman Welker
