= 2028 United States Senate elections =

Senate election for the 121st US Congress

- November 7, 2028
- Class 3

35 (Note: 34 Class 3 seats, as well as one Class 1 seat in special election) of the 100 seats in the United States Senate 51 (Note: Majority control in an evenly divided Senate is determined by the Vice President of the United States, who has the power to break tied votes in their constitutional capacity as President of the Senate; accordingly, Senate control requires 51 seats or 50 seats with control of the vice presidency.) seats needed for a majority

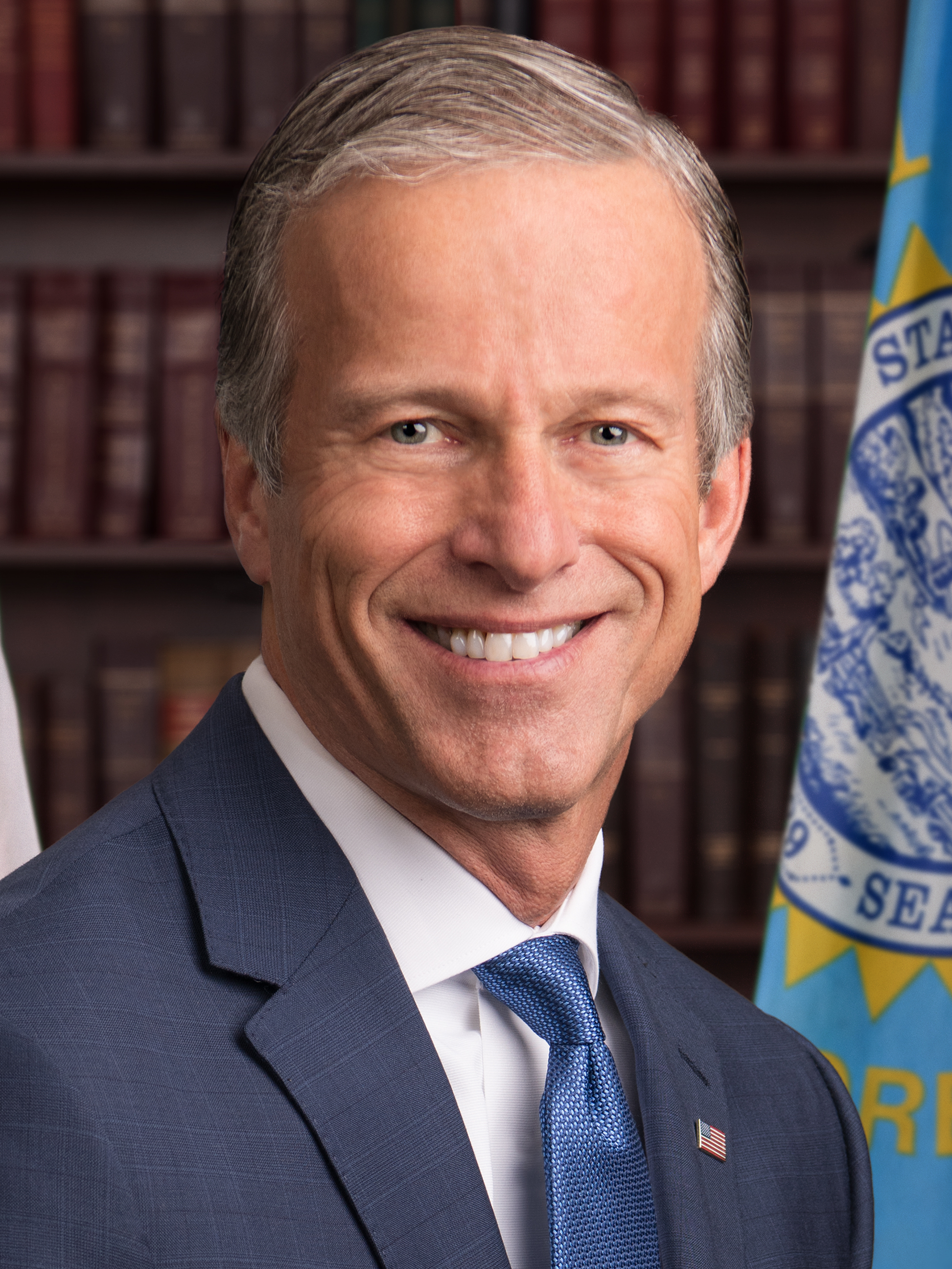
Leader	TBD	John Thune
Party	Democratic	Republican
Leader's seat	TBD	South Dakota
Current seats	54 (Note: Both independent senators (Bernie Sanders of Vermont, and Angus King of Maine) caucus with the Democrats.)	44
Seats needed	Steady	▲7
Seats up	16	19
Party	Independent
Current seats	2
Seats up	0
- Map of the incumbents: Democratic incumbent Republican incumbent Incumbent to be determined No election
Incumbent Majority Leader
TBD
Democratic

Elections for the United States Senate will be held on November 7, 2028, with 34 of the 100 seats being contested in regular elections, the winners of which will serve 6-year terms in the United States Congress from January 3, 2029, to January 3, 2035, which will include the entire term of the president who wins the 2028 presidential election and the first two years of the 2032 presidential election winner's term. Senators are divided into three classes whose terms are staggered so that a different class is elected every other year. Class 3 senators were last elected in 2022, and will be up for election again in 2028. A special election is expected to be held in Tennessee, to fill Marsha Blackburn's unexpired Senate term. These elections will run concurrently with the 2028 United States presidential election.

== Partisan composition ==
All 34 Class 3 Senate seats, and one Class 1 seat, are up for election in 2028; Class 3 currently consists of 18 Republicans and 16 Democrats. If vacancies occur in Class 1 or Class 2 Senate seats, that state might require a special election to take place during the 120th Congress, possibly concurrently with the other 2028 Senate elections.

Democrats are defending five seats in states won by Donald Trump in 2024 (Arizona, Georgia, Nevada, Ohio, and Pennsylvania), and one seat in a state won by Kamala Harris by a single-digit margin (New Hampshire). They are also defending two states which elected Republican governors in 2026 (New Hampshire, Vermont). However, of these states, three were contested and won by Democratic Senate candidates that year (Georgia, New Hampshire, and Ohio), and all but New Hampshire and Vermont also elected Democratic governors that year.

Republicans are defending no seats in states won by Harris in 2024, but two seats in states won by Trump by a single-digit margin (North Carolina and Wisconsin). They are defending seats in five states won by Democratic Senate candidates in 2026 (Alaska, Iowa, Kansas, North Carolina, and South Carolina), and four states which elected a Democratic governor that year (Alaska, Iowa, Kansas, and Wisconsin). However, one of these states elected a Republican governor that year (South Carolina).

Due to historic gains made by the Democrats in 2026, Aaron Blake of CNN described a substantial buffer for the party in the 2028 Senate map. Democrats would only need to win in all states that never voted for Trump in order to maintain control of the chamber, and to get beyond a 50–50 tie (requiring the elected Vice President breaking the tie), Republicans would have to win in at least one state where Harris won by a double-digit margin in 2024. According to Owen Winter of The Economist, this Senate map is expected to be the Democrats' most forgiving map since 1966.

== Change in composition ==
Each block represents one of the one hundred seats in the U.S. Senate. "D#" is a Democratic senator and "R#" is a Republican senator. They are arranged so that the parties are separated and a majority is clear by crossing the middle.

=== Before the elections ===
Each block indicates an incumbent senator's actions going into the election.

D_{1}	D_{2}	D_{3}	D_{4}	D_{5}	D_{6}	D_{7}	D_{8}	D_{9}	D_{10}
D_{20}	D_{19}	D_{18}	D_{17}	D_{16}	D_{15}	D_{14}	D_{13}	D_{12}	D_{11}
D_{21}	D_{22}	D_{23}	D_{24}	D_{25}	D_{26}	D_{27}	D_{28}	D_{29}	D_{30}
D_{40} Ore. Running	D_{39} Conn. Running	D_{38} Vt. Undeclared	D_{37}	D_{36}	D_{35}	D_{34}	D_{33}	D_{32}	D_{31}
D_{41} Wash. Running	D_{42} Ariz. Undeclared	D_{43} Calif. Undeclared	D_{44} Colo. Undeclared	D_{45} Ga. Undeclared	D_{46} Hawaii; Undeclared	D_{47} Ill. Undeclared	D_{48} Md. Undeclared	D_{49} Nev. Undeclared	D_{50} N.H. Undeclared
Majority →									D_{50} N.H. Undeclared
R_{41} Okla. Undeclared	R_{42} Tenn. (sp.); Undeclared	R_{43} Utah; Undeclared	R_{44} Wisc. Undeclared	Minn. TBD in 2027	I_{1}	I_{2}	D_{53} Pa. Undeclared	D_{52} Ohio; Undeclared	D_{51} N.Y. Undeclared
R_{40} N.D. Undeclared	R_{39} Mo. Undeclared	R_{38} La. Undeclared	R_{37} Ky. Undeclared	R_{36} Kans. Undeclared	R_{35} Iowa; Undeclared	R_{34} Ind. Undeclared	R_{33} Idaho; Undeclared	R_{32} Fla. Undeclared	R_{31} Ark. Undeclared
R_{21}	R_{22}	R_{23}	R_{24}	R_{25}	R_{26} N.C. Running	R_{27} S.C. Running	R_{28} S.D. Running	R_{29} Ala. Undeclared	R_{30} Alaska; Undeclared
R_{20}	R_{19}	R_{18}	R_{17}	R_{16}	R_{15}	R_{14}	R_{13}	R_{12}	R_{11}
R_{1}	R_{2}	R_{3}	R_{4}	R_{5}	R_{6}	R_{7}	R_{8}	R_{9}	R_{10}

=== After the elections ===
D_{1}	D_{2}	D_{3}	D_{4}	D_{5}	D_{6}	D_{7}	D_{8}	D_{9}	D_{10}
D_{20}	D_{19}	D_{18}	D_{17}	D_{16}	D_{15}	D_{14}	D_{13}	D_{12}	D_{11}
D_{21}	D_{22}	D_{23}	D_{24}	D_{25}	D_{26}	D_{27}	D_{28}	D_{29}	D_{30}
I_{2}	I_{1}	Minn. TBD in 2027	D_{37}	D_{36}	D_{35}	D_{34}	D_{33}	D_{32}	D_{31}
Ala. TBD	Alaska; TBD	Ariz. TBD	Ark. TBD	Calif. TBD	Colo. TBD	Conn. TBD	Fla. TBD	Ga. TBD	Hawaii; TBD
Majority TBD →									Hawaii; TBD
Nev. TBD	Mo. TBD	Md. TBD	La. TBD	Ky. TBD	Kans. TBD	Iowa; TBD	Ind. TBD	Ill. TBD	Idaho; TBD
N.H. TBD	N.Y. TBD	N.C. TBD	N.D. TBD	Ohio; TBD	Okla. TBD	Ore. TBD	Pa. TBD	S.C. TBD	S.D. TBD
R_{21}	R_{22}	R_{23}	R_{24}	R_{25}	Wisc. TBD	Wash. TBD	Vt. TBD	Utah; TBD	Tenn. (sp.); TBD
R_{20}	R_{19}	R_{18}	R_{17}	R_{16}	R_{15}	R_{14}	R_{13}	R_{12}	R_{11}
R_{1}	R_{2}	R_{3}	R_{4}	R_{5}	R_{6}	R_{7}	R_{8}	R_{9}	R_{10}

Key

D_{#}	Democratic
R_{#}	Republican
I_{#}	Independent, caucusing with Democrats

== Race summary ==
=== Special elections during the preceding Congress ===
In each special election, the winner's term begins immediately after their election is certified by their state's government.

Elections are sorted by date then state.

State	Incumbent			Status	Candidates
State	Senator	Party	Electoral history	Status	Candidates
Tennessee (Class 1)	To be appointed	Republican	TBD (appointed)	Interim appointee's intent unknown	▌Tim Burchett (Republican)

=== Elections leading to the next Congress ===
In these general elections, the winners will be elected for the term beginning January 3, 2029.

State (linked to summaries below)	Incumbent				Results	Candidates
State (linked to summaries below)	Senator		Electoral history	Last race	Results	Candidates
Alabama	Katie Britt	Republican	2022	66.6% R	Incumbent's intent unknown	▌Dale Shelton Deas Jr. (Republican)
Alaska	Lisa Murkowski	Republican	2002 (appointed); 2004; 2010 (write-in); 2016; 2022	53.7% R (Note: Against fellow Republican)	Incumbent's intent unknown	TBD
Arizona	Mark Kelly	Democratic	2020 (special); 2022	51.4% D	Incumbent's intent unknown	TBD
Arkansas	John Boozman	Republican	2010; 2016; 2022	65.7% R	Incumbent's intent unknown	TBD
California	Alex Padilla	Democratic	2021 (appointed); 2022 (special); 2022	61.1% D	Incumbent's intent unknown	TBD
Colorado	Michael Bennet	Democratic	2009 (appointed); 2010; 2016; 2022	55.9% D	Incumbent's intent unknown	TBD
Connecticut	Richard Blumenthal	Democratic	2010; 2016; 2022	57.5% D	Incumbent running	▌Richard Blumenthal (Democratic)
Florida	Ashley Moody	Republican	2025 (appointed); 2026 (special)	50.9% R (Note: Republican Marco Rubio won with 57.7% of the vote in 2022, he resigned January 20, 2025, after being appointed Secretary of State.)	Incumbent's intent unknown	TBD
Georgia	Raphael Warnock	Democratic	2021 (special); 2022	51.4% D	Incumbent's intent unknown	TBD
Hawaii	Brian Schatz	Democratic	2012 (appointed); 2014 (special); 2016; 2022	71.2% D	Incumbent's intent unknown	TBD
Idaho	Mike Crapo	Republican	1998; 2004; 2010; 2016; 2022	60.7% R	Incumbent's intent unknown	TBD
Illinois	Tammy Duckworth	Democratic	2016; 2022	56.8% D	Incumbent's intent unknown	TBD
Indiana	Todd Young	Republican	2016; 2022	58.6% R	Incumbent's intent unknown	TBD
Iowa	Chuck Grassley	Republican	1980; 1986; 1992; 1998; 2004; 2010; 2016; 2022	56.0% R	Incumbent's intent unknown	TBD
Kansas	Jerry Moran	Republican	2010; 2016; 2022	60.0% R	Incumbent's intent unknown	TBD
Kentucky	Rand Paul	Republican	2010; 2016; 2022	61.8% R	Incumbent's intent unknown	TBD
Louisiana	John Kennedy	Republican	2016; 2022	61.6% R	Incumbent's intent unknown	TBD
Maryland	Chris Van Hollen	Democratic	2016; 2022	65.8% D	Incumbent's intent unknown	TBD
Missouri	Eric Schmitt	Republican	2022	55.4% R	Incumbent's intent unknown	TBD
Nevada	Catherine Cortez Masto	Democratic	2016; 2022	48.8% D	Incumbent's intent unknown	TBD
New Hampshire	Maggie Hassan	Democratic	2016; 2022	53.5% D	Incumbent's intent unknown	TBD
New York	Chuck Schumer	Democratic	1998; 2004; 2010; 2016; 2022	56.8% D	Incumbent's intent unknown	TBD
North Carolina	Ted Budd	Republican	2022	50.5% R	Incumbent running	▌Ted Budd (Republican)
North Dakota	John Hoeven	Republican	2010; 2016; 2022	56.4% R	Incumbent's intent unknown	TBD
Ohio	Sherrod Brown	Democratic	2006; 2012; 2018; 2024 (lost); 2026 (special)	50.01% D (Note: Republican JD Vance won with 53.0% of the vote in 2022; he resigned January 10, 2025, after being elected Vice President of the United States.)	Incumbent's intent unknown	TBD
Oklahoma	James Lankford	Republican	2014 (special); 2016; 2022	64.3% R	Incumbent's intent unknown	TBD
Oregon	Ron Wyden	Democratic	1996 (special); 1998; 2004; 2010; 2016; 2022	55.8% D	Incumbent running	▌Ron Wyden (Democratic)
Pennsylvania	John Fetterman	Democratic	2022	51.2% D	Incumbent's intent unknown	▌Ahmed Moor (Democratic)
South Carolina	Tim Scott	Republican	2013 (appointed); 2014 (special); 2016; 2022	62.9% R	Incumbent running	▌Tim Scott (Republican)
South Dakota	John Thune	Republican	2004; 2010; 2016; 2022	69.6% R	Incumbent running	▌John Thune (Republican)
Utah	Mike Lee	Republican	2010; 2016; 2022	53.2% R	Incumbent's intent unknown	TBD
Vermont	Peter Welch	Democratic	2022	68.5% D	Incumbent's intent unknown	TBD
Washington	Patty Murray	Democratic	1992; 1998; 2004; 2010; 2016; 2022	57.1% D	Incumbent running	▌Patty Murray (Democratic)
Wisconsin	Ron Johnson	Republican	2010; 2016; 2022	50.4% R	Incumbent's intent unknown	TBD

== Alabama ==
Alabama election
Party	Republican	Democratic
Incumbent U.S. senator
Katie Britt
Republican

One-term Republican Katie Britt was elected in 2022 with 66.8% of the vote.

Dale Shelton Deas Jr., a cardiac surgeon and candidate for the Republican nomination for U.S. Senate in 2026, filed to run for the Republican nomination in 2028.

== Alaska ==
Alaska election
Incumbent U.S. senator
Lisa Murkowski
Republican

Four-term Republican Lisa Murkowski was re-elected in 2022 with 53.7% of the vote. Governor Mike Dunleavy is seen as a potential Republican challenger to Murkowski.

== Arizona ==
Arizona election
Party	Democratic	Republican
Incumbent U.S. senator
Mark Kelly
Democratic

One-term Democrat Mark Kelly was elected to a full term in 2022 with 51.4% of the vote after winning a special election in 2020 to complete the remainder of Republican John McCain's term.

In February 2026, Kelly said he would "seriously consider" a run for president in 2028. Arizona permits simultaneously running for U.S. Senate and the presidency.

== Arkansas ==
Arkansas election
Party	Republican	Democratic
Incumbent U.S. senator
John Boozman
Republican

Three-term Republican John Boozman was re-elected in 2022 with 65.7% of the vote.

== California ==
California election
Incumbent U.S. senator
Alex Padilla
Democratic

One-term Democrat Alex Padilla was elected to a first full term in 2022 with 61.1% of the vote after being appointed in 2021 to complete the term of Kamala Harris, who resigned after being elected vice president of the United States.

== Colorado ==
Colorado election
Party	Democratic	Republican
Incumbent U.S. senator
Michael Bennet
Democratic

Three-term Democrat Michael Bennet was re-elected in 2022 with 55.9% of the vote. Bennet ran for governor in 2026, but lost in the primary to Phil Weiser.

== Connecticut ==
Connecticut election
Party	Democratic	Republican
Incumbent U.S. senator
Richard Blumenthal
Democratic

Three-term Democrat Richard Blumenthal was re-elected in 2022 with 57.5% of the vote. Shortly after the 2026 midterms, Blumenthal announced his intention to seek re-election in 2028.

== Florida ==
Florida election
Party	Republican	Democratic
Incumbent U.S. senator
Ashley Moody
Republican

Three-term Republican Marco Rubio was re-elected in 2022 with 57.68% of the vote. He resigned on January 20, 2025, following his confirmation as secretary of state. Governor Ron DeSantis appointed state attorney general Ashley Moody as a temporary successor. Moody won the subsequent 2026 special election, defeating Democratic state representative Angie Nixon by a closer-than-expected margin.

Nixon has expressed interest in running again in 2028. U.S. representatives Jared Moskowitz and Kathy Castor are also seen as potential candidates.

== Georgia ==
Georgia election
Party	Democratic	Republican
Incumbent U.S. senator
Raphael Warnock
Democratic

One-term Democrat Raphael Warnock was elected to a full term in a 2022 runoff with 51.4% of the vote, having first been narrowly elected in a special election in a 2021 runoff to complete the remainder of Republican Johnny Isakson's term.

Republican Congressman Rich McCormick, Congressman Buddy Carter, and state Attorney General Chris Carr have expressed interest in running for this seat. Other potential candidates include Georgia insurance commissioner John F. King, Small Business Administration administrator and former U.S. senator Kelly Loeffler, and Georgia governor Brian Kemp. U.S. Secretary of Veterans Affairs Doug Collins has declined to run.

== Hawaii ==
Hawaii election
Party	Democratic	Republican
Incumbent U.S. senator
Brian Schatz
Democratic

Two-term Democrat Brian Schatz was re-elected in 2022 to a second full term with 71.2% of the vote.

== Idaho ==
Idaho election
Party	Republican	Democratic
Incumbent U.S. senator
Mike Crapo
Republican

Five-term Republican Mike Crapo was re-elected in 2022 with 60.7% of the vote.

== Illinois ==
Illinois election
Party	Democratic	Republican
Incumbent U.S. senator
Tammy Duckworth
Democratic

Two-term Democrat Tammy Duckworth was re-elected in 2022 with 56.8% of the vote.

== Indiana ==
Indiana election
Party	Republican	Democratic
Incumbent U.S. senator
Todd Young
Republican

Two-term Republican Todd Young was re-elected in 2022 with 58.6% of the vote. Former state senator Carlin Yoder is seen as a potential primary challenger to Young.

== Iowa ==
Iowa election
Party	Republican	Democratic
Incumbent U.S. senator
Chuck Grassley
Republican

Eight-term Republican Chuck Grassley was re-elected in 2022 with 56.0% of the vote. As the most senior member of the Senate, Grassley will be 95 years old at the time of election and would be 101 years old if he completes the full term. He has stated that he is waiting until after the 2026 midterms to decide whether or not he will seek re-election. On November 15, 2026, Grassley told CNN's Manu Raju that he's made a decision, but has to talk to other people about it first before announcing it to the public. If he wins re-election, he would be the oldest senator to ever win an election, beating Strom Thurmond. If he serves the next full term, Grassley can also surpass Robert Byrd as the longest-serving senator in American history, surpass John Dingell as the longest serving member of Congress in American history, and surpass Thurmond as the oldest-serving senator in American history.

Senior advisor to the United States Agency for Global Media, Kari Lake, who was previously the Republican nominee for governor of Arizona in 2022 and the U.S. Senate in 2024, has since moved back to Iowa, and she is viewed as a potential candidate.

Outgoing U.S. Representative Ashley Hinson, who lost in the 2026 election to Democrat Josh Turek, has also expressed interest in running again as a potential candidate.

Grassley's grandson Pat Grassley, who serves as speaker of the Iowa House of Representatives from Iowa's 57th house district, said in a January 2025 interview that he would not rule out running for his grandfather's seat in the near future.

Former U.S. Representative David Young said in November 2026 that he is "not closing the door on running for political office in the future" and has been speculated as a possible candidate to succeed Grassley if he retires.

== Kansas ==
Kansas election
Party	Republican	Democratic
Incumbent U.S. senator
Jerry Moran
Republican

Three-term Republican Jerry Moran was re-elected in 2022 with 60.0% of the vote.

U.S. representative Sharice Davids is seen as a potential candidate in the Democratic primary.

== Kentucky ==
Kentucky election
Party	Republican	Democratic
Incumbent U.S. senator
Rand Paul
Republican

Three-term Republican Rand Paul was re-elected in 2022 with 61.8% of the vote.

Following public criticisms by President Donald Trump over Paul's breaks with Trump-backed legislation, several outlets have reported that Trump or his allies might support a 2028 Republican primary challenge to Paul. U.S. Ambassador to Colombia nominee and 2026 U.S. Senate candidate Nate Morris is a potential primary challenger to Paul.

Senator Paul indicated in a March 2026 interview on CBS News Sunday Morning that he was "considering" a run for president in 2028. Kentucky does not permit simultaneously running for U.S. Senate and the presidency.

== Louisiana ==
Louisiana election
Party	Republican	Democratic
Incumbent U.S. senator
John Kennedy
Republican

Two-term Republican John Kennedy was re-elected in 2022 with 61.6% of the vote in the first round of the "Louisiana primary".

Kennedy said in a New Hampshire interview at Politics and Eggs that he planned to run for re-election but he would "never say never" to a possible 2028 presidential run. He said in a June 2026 interview at New Hampshire Institute of Politics at St. Anselm's College that he had been contacted by donors about a run for president and that he was open to the idea. Louisiana permits simultaneously running for U.S. Senate and the presidency.

Senator Bill Cassidy, who lost his primary bid in 2026, was originally seen as a potential primary challenger, but later ruled out the possibility of running for any public office in the future.

In November 2026, farmer Jamie Davis, the Democratic nominee for U.S. Senate in 2026, said he would run for U.S. Senate again in 2028 if he does not run for governor in 2027.

== Maryland ==
Maryland election
Party	Democratic	Republican
Incumbent U.S. senator
Chris Van Hollen
Democratic

Two-term Democrat Chris Van Hollen was re-elected in 2022 with 65.8% of the vote.

In a podcast interview with NOTUS after visiting Iowa and New Hampshire in June 2026, Van Hollen said that he was "kicking the tires" on a 2028 presidential run. However, he later ruled out a presidential bid in November 2026 to challenge Chuck Schumer for Senate Majority Leader.

== Missouri ==
Missouri election
Party	Republican	Democratic
Incumbent U.S. senator
Eric Schmitt
Republican

One-term Republican Eric Schmitt was elected in 2022 with 55.4% of the vote.

Kansas City Mayor Quinton Lucas, who will be term-limited in his current position in 2027, is a potential Democratic candidate. On November 19, 2026, he formed an exploratory committee to run for governor in 2028.

== Nevada ==
Nevada election
Party	Democratic	Republican
Incumbent U.S. senator
Catherine Cortez Masto
Democratic

Two-term Democrat Catherine Cortez Masto was narrowly re-elected in 2022 with 48.8% of the vote.

== New Hampshire ==
New Hampshire election
Party	Democratic	Republican
Incumbent U.S. senator
Maggie Hassan
Democratic

Two-term Democrat Maggie Hassan was re-elected in 2022 with 53.5% of the vote.

== New York ==
New York election
Party	Democratic	Republican
Incumbent U.S. senator
Chuck Schumer
Democratic

Five-term Democrat and Senate Democratic Leader Chuck Schumer was re-elected in 2022 with 56.8% of the vote.

Representative Alexandria Ocasio-Cortez has been seen as a possible candidate for the Democratic primary. Ocasio-Cortez has seen private support from colleagues to challenge Schumer following his support of a Republican budget bill. A Data for Progress poll found her leading Schumer 55%–36% in a hypothetical primary. A poll by Honan Strategy Group similarly showed a 21-point lead for Ocasio-Cortez over Schumer amongst Democratic primary voters. In September 2026, Ocasio-Cortez said that she will decide whether to run for president or for Schumer's Senate seat after the midterm elections.

Other potential Democratic candidates include Representative Pat Ryan, Representative Ritchie Torres, and New York city councilor Chi Ossé.

Outgoing representative Mike Lawler is also seen as a possible Republican candidate.

== North Carolina ==
North Carolina election
Party	Republican	Democratic
Incumbent U.S. senator
Ted Budd
Republican

One-term Republican Ted Budd was elected in 2022 with 50.5% of the vote. He is running for re-election.

Former U.S. Representative Mark Walker, who was a candidate for this seat in 2022, has filed paperwork to challenge Budd in the primary.

U.S. Representative Don Davis, state Attorney General Jeff Jackson, and Wake County District Attorney-elect Wiley Nickel are seen as potential candidates in the Democratic primary, with Davis expressing interest in running.

== North Dakota ==
North Dakota election
Party	Republican	Democratic
Incumbent U.S. senator
John Hoeven
Republican

Three-term Republican John Hoeven was re-elected in 2022 with 56.4% of the vote in a three candidate election.

== Ohio ==
Ohio election
Party	Democratic	Republican
Incumbent U.S. senator
Sherrod Brown
Democratic

Republican JD Vance was elected in 2022 with 53% of the vote. He resigned on January 10, 2025, to assume the vice presidency. Governor Mike DeWine appointed then-lieutenant governor Jon Husted. Former Democratic senator Sherrod Brown, following his defeat in 2024, defeated Husted in the 2026 special election.

Former U.S. Representative Mike Turner and state Senator Kevin Coughlin are seen as two potential candidates for the Republican nomination. Vance has also been named as a potential candidate should he forgo a presidential campaign.

== Oklahoma ==
Oklahoma election
Party	Republican	Democratic
Incumbent U.S. senator
James Lankford
Republican

Two-term Republican James Lankford was re-elected in 2022 with 64.3% of the vote.

On January 29, 2024, the Oklahoma Republican Party censured Lankford for negotiating with Democrats on a potential border deal. In an interview the following month, then-former President Donald Trump stated that Lankford's actions are "very bad for his career" and did not rule out endorsing a primary challenger in 2028.

== Oregon ==
Oregon election
Party	Democratic	Republican
Incumbent U.S. senator
Ron Wyden
Democratic

Five-term Democrat Ron Wyden was re-elected in 2022 with 55.8% of the vote. He is running for re-election.

== Pennsylvania ==
Pennsylvania election
Party	Democratic	Republican
Incumbent U.S. senator
John Fetterman
Democratic

One-term Democrat John Fetterman was elected in 2022 with 51.2% of the vote.

Palestinian American writer and businessman Ahmed Moor is running in the Democratic primary.

Democratic former U.S. Representative Conor Lamb has been seen as a potential primary challenger given his criticism of Fetterman amid discontent with the senator among Democratic voters for failing to adequately oppose President Trump and the Republican Party, not holding town halls and public events since the November 2024 elections, voting to confirm many of Trump's nominees, and advocating for the United States to bomb Iran while continuously and repeatedly criticizing Democrats such as condemning the party's rhetoric towards Trump. Lamb has been a longtime rival of Fetterman and was one of his two primary opponents in 2022.

Democratic Congresswoman Summer Lee is also seen as a potential challenger to Fetterman. On June 25, Lee supposedly took aim at Fetterman by posting "2028 can't come fast enough for PA" after he voted against the Iran War Powers Resolution. Lee's fellow Squad members Rashida Tlaib, Ilhan Omar, and Ayanna Pressley expressed their support for her possible candidacy.

Other potential primary challengers in addition to Lamb, Moor, and Lee include state Representative Malcolm Kenyatta (who also previously ran in 2022), state Senator Maria Collett, Philadelphia District Attorney Larry Krasner, U.S. representatives Madeleine Dean, Chris Deluzio, Chrissy Houlahan, Mary Gay Scanlon, and former U.S. representative Susan Wild.

Former U.S. senator Bob Casey and U.S. representative Brendan Boyle were seen as potential candidates but have declined to run.

In November 2026, Fetterman said during an interview with Fox News that he would leave the Democratic Party if Maryland's Chris Van Hollen was elected Senate Majority Leader against New York's Chuck Schumer.

== South Carolina ==
South Carolina election
Party	Republican	Democratic
Incumbent U.S. senator
Tim Scott
Republican

Two-term Republican incumbent Tim Scott was re-elected in 2022 with 62.9% of the vote. Scott originally pledged that he would retire in 2028, before later reversing his decision and announcing a re-election bid in March 2026.

== South Dakota ==
South Dakota election
Party	Republican	Democratic
Incumbent U.S. senator
John Thune
Republican

Four-term Republican and Senate Republican Leader John Thune was re-elected in 2022 with 69.6% of the vote. He is running for re-election.

Former governor and former U.S. secretary of homeland security Kristi Noem was seen as a potential primary challenger to Thune; however, she declined to run.

== Tennessee (special) ==
Tennessee special election
Party	Republican	Democratic
Incumbent U.S. senator
TBD

Two-term Republican Marsha Blackburn was re-elected in 2024 with 63.8% of the vote. Blackburn will resign from the Senate after winning the 2026 gubernatorial election. U.S. representatives Chuck Fleischmann and Tim Burchett are considered possible appointees by governor Bill Lee. Former professional wrestler and Knox County Mayor Glenn Jacobs, who served as campaign treasurer for Blackburn's gubernatorial campaign, is also seen as a possible appointee. However, Blackburn says she plans to appoint her own successor to the Senate. In that case, there will be a special election for the final two years of Blackburn's term.

== Utah ==
Utah election
Party	Republican	Democratic
Incumbent U.S. senator
Mike Lee
Republican

Three-term Republican Mike Lee was re-elected in 2022 with 53.2% of the vote.

== Vermont ==
Vermont election
Party	Democratic	Republican
Incumbent U.S. senator
Peter Welch
Democratic

One-term Democrat Peter Welch was elected in 2022 with 68.5% of the vote.

== Washington ==
Washington election
Incumbent U.S. senator
Patty Murray
Democratic

Six-term Democrat Patty Murray was re-elected in 2022 with 57.1% of the vote. She is running for re-election.

Washington Superintendent of Public Instruction Chris Reykdal, a Democrat, is seen as a potential challenger after saying he may run for a "higher office" in 2028.

== Wisconsin ==
Wisconsin election
Party	Republican	Democratic
Incumbent U.S. senator
Ron Johnson
Republican

Three-term Republican Ron Johnson was re-elected in 2022 with 50.4% of the vote. Though officially undecided, Johnson has indicated that he will not seek a fourth term. Businessman Eric Hovde, who was the Republican nominee for U.S. Senate in 2024, has expressed interest in running if Johnson does not run. Outgoing U.S. representative Bryan Steil is also considered a potential candidate if Johnson does not run. Former Republican governor Scott Walker was a potential candidate but ultimately declined to run.

Former chair of the Democratic Party of Wisconsin, Ben Wikler, has publicly expressed interest in challenging Johnson.

== See also ==
- 2028 United States elections
  - 2028 United States presidential election
  - 2028 United States House of Representatives elections
  - 2028 United States gubernatorial elections
- Seniority in the United States Senate
