= 1992 United States House of Representatives elections in Idaho =

- November 3, 1992

All 2 Idaho seats to the United States House of Representatives
	Majority party	Minority party
Party	Republican	Democratic
Last election	0	2
Seats won	1	1
Seat change	▲1	▼1
Popular vote	230,766	222,435
Percentage	48.82%	47.05%

The 1992 United States House of Representatives elections in Idaho were held on November 3, 1992, to elect the state of Idaho's two members to the United States House of Representatives. In the 1st district, Democratic Congressman Larry LaRocco was re-elected to a second term. In the 2nd district, Democratic Congressman Richard H. Stallings unsuccessfully ran for the U.S. Senate rather than seek re-election, and he was succeeded by Idaho Senate President Pro Tempore Mike Crapo, the Republican nominee.

== Overview ==
1992 United States House of Representatives elections in Idaho
Party	Votes	Percentage	Seats	+/–
Republican	230,766	48.82%	1	▲1
Democratic	222,435	47.05%	1	▼1
Independent	19,516	4.13%	0	—
Totals	472,717	100.00%	2	—

== District 1 ==
Incumbent Democratic Congressman Larry LaRocco ran for re-election to a second term. He won the Democratic nomination unopposed and faced former State Senator Rachel Gilbert, the Republican nominee, in the general election. LaRocco defeated Gilbert in a landslide, winning re-election with 58 percent of the vote.

=== Republican primary ===
==== Candidates ====
- Rachel Gilbert, former State Senator
- David Doremus, businessman

==== Results ====
Republican primary results
Party	Candidate	Votes	%
Republican	Rachel Gilbert	35,743	73.55%
Republican	David Doremus	12,851	26.45%
Total votes		48,594	100.00%

=== Democratic primary ===
==== Candidates ====
- Larry LaRocco, incumbent U.S. Representative

==== Results ====
Democratic primary results
Party	Candidate	Votes	%
Democratic	Larry LaRocco (inc.)	31,252	100.00%
Total votes		31,252	100.00%

=== General election ===
==== Candidates ====
- Larry LaRocco (Democratic)
- Rachel Gilbert (Republican)
- John Abel (Independent)
- Sonny Kinsey (Independent)

==== Results ====
1992 Idaho's 1st congressional district general election results
Party	Candidate	Votes	%
Democratic	Larry LaRocco (inc.)	140,985	58.08%
Republican	Rachel Gilbert	90,983	37.48%
Independent	John Abel	6,225	2.56%
Independent	Sonny Kinsey	4,567	1.88%
Total votes		242,760	100.00%
Democratic hold			

== District 2 ==
Incumbent Democratic Congressman Richard H. Stallings opted to run for the U.S. Senate rather than seek re-election. Mike Crapo, the President Pro Tempore of the Idaho Senate, won the Republican primary over Ada County Commissioner Gary Glenn. State Auditor J. D. Williams defeated former Ketchum Mayor Jerry Seiffert to win the Democratic primary. In the general election, Crapo defeated Williams in a landslide, winning 61 percent of the vote to Williams's 35 percent.

=== Republican primary ===
==== Candidates ====
- Mike Crapo, President Pro Tempore of the Idaho Senate
- Gary Glenn, Ada County Commissioner

==== Results ====
Republican primary results
Party	Candidate	Votes	%
Republican	Mike Crapo	45,462	67.95%
Republican	Gary Glenn	21,443	32.05%
Total votes		66,905	100.00%

=== Democratic primary ===
==== Candidates ====
- J. D. Williams, State Auditor
- Jerry Seiffert, former Mayor of Ketchum

==== Results ====
Democratic primary results
Party	Candidate	Votes	%
Democratic	J.D. Williams	15,195	71.43%
Democratic	Jerry Seiffert	6,079	28.57%
Total votes		21,274	100.00%

=== General election ===
==== Candidates ====
- Mike Crapo (Republican)
- J. D. Williams (Democratic)
- Steven Kauer (Independent)
- David Mansfield (Independent)

==== Results ====
1992 Idaho's 2nd congressional district general election results
Party	Candidate	Votes	%
Republican	Mike Crapo	139,783	60.79%
Democratic	J. D. Williams	81,450	35.42%
Independent	Steven Kauer	4,917	2.14%
Independent	David Mansfield	3,807	1.66%
Total votes		229,957	100.00%
Republican gain from Democratic			

== See also ==
- 1992 United States House of Representatives elections
