= Ahmed Moor =

Palestinian-American writer

- Born: 1983 or 1984 (age 42–43); Rafah Camp, Gaza Strip
- Education: University of Pennsylvania (BA); Harvard University (MPP)
- Occupations: Writer; Journalist
- Political party: Democratic
- Other political affiliations: Democratic Socialists of America
- Website: Campaign website

Ahmed Moor (born 1983 or 1984) is a Palestinian-American writer and entrepreneur. He co-founded the peer-to-peer lending company liwwa.com and co-edited the book After Zionism: One State for Israel and Palestine (2012). He is running for the Democratic nomination in the 2028 United States Senate election in Pennsylvania. He is a member of the Democratic Socialists of America.

== Early life and education ==
Moor was born in the Rafah refugee camp in the Gaza Strip. According to Moor, his grandfather was displaced from Beer al-Sabaa in 1948.

Moor and his family moved to Philadelphia when he was 7 years old. They moved back to Palestine when he was a teenager and lived in Ramallah in the West Bank for three years, until 2000. He later graduated from Roxborough High School and received a BA from the University of Pennsylvania in 2006.

Moor won a Paul & Daisy Soros Fellowship for New Americans in 2012 and received a Master in Public Policy from Harvard University in 2013.

== Career ==
After graduating from the University of Pennsylvania in 2006, Moor worked for three years in finance in New York. He then worked as a journalist in Beirut, Lebanon, where he wrote about politics, human rights, Palestine, and migration.

In November 2013, Moor co-founded liwwa, a peer-to-peer lending network designed to help connect small businesses in need of capital with people wanting to invest. He was CEO of liwwa for six years, during which time the company grew from a small, two-person endeavor into a "50-person business with millions of dollars in annual sales and revenue."

Moor was a fellow at the Foundation for Middle East Peace (FMEP) from January 2025 to November 4, 2026.

== Commentary and publications ==
Moor's commentary has appeared in The Guardian, Al Jazeera,The Nation, and The Philadelphia Inquirer. He hosted the FMEP podcast Occupied Thoughts.

In 2012, Moor co-edited After Zionism: One State for Israel and Palestine with Antony Lowenstein. The book argues for a one-state solution to the Israeli–Palestinian conflict. The editors state that "Jews and Palestinians are destined to work together, whatever our differences in background, ideals and daily life. We are connected with our desire to see peace with justice for our peoples."

Moor said they "adapted a one-state paradigm mainly because one state exists today. Israel/Palestine is an apartheid state," criticizing the two-state model as "an article of faith" detached from "the reality on the ground." Publishers Weekly said the book "offers valuable contributions to a debate that should be front and center, yet is confined to ever-smaller margins."

While a student at Harvard in March 2012, Moor was an organizer of the "One State Conference" at the Kennedy School of Government.

== U.S. Senate campaign ==
On November 9, 2026, Moor announced he would run for U.S. Senate in Pennsylvania in the 2028 elections. Moor became the first major primary challenger to incumbent John Fetterman in the Democratic primary, who has become increasingly unpopular among the Democratic electorate. A member of the Democratic Socialists of America, he noted Representative-elect Chris Rabb as an inspiration for entering the race. Moor is running on universal child care, Medicare for All, and a nationwide billionaire tax, modelled after the 2026 California Proposition 40. Prior to his announcement, Moor had previously served as a member of the Philadelphia Democratic City Committee.
