= 2016 United States Senate election in Idaho =

- November 8, 2016
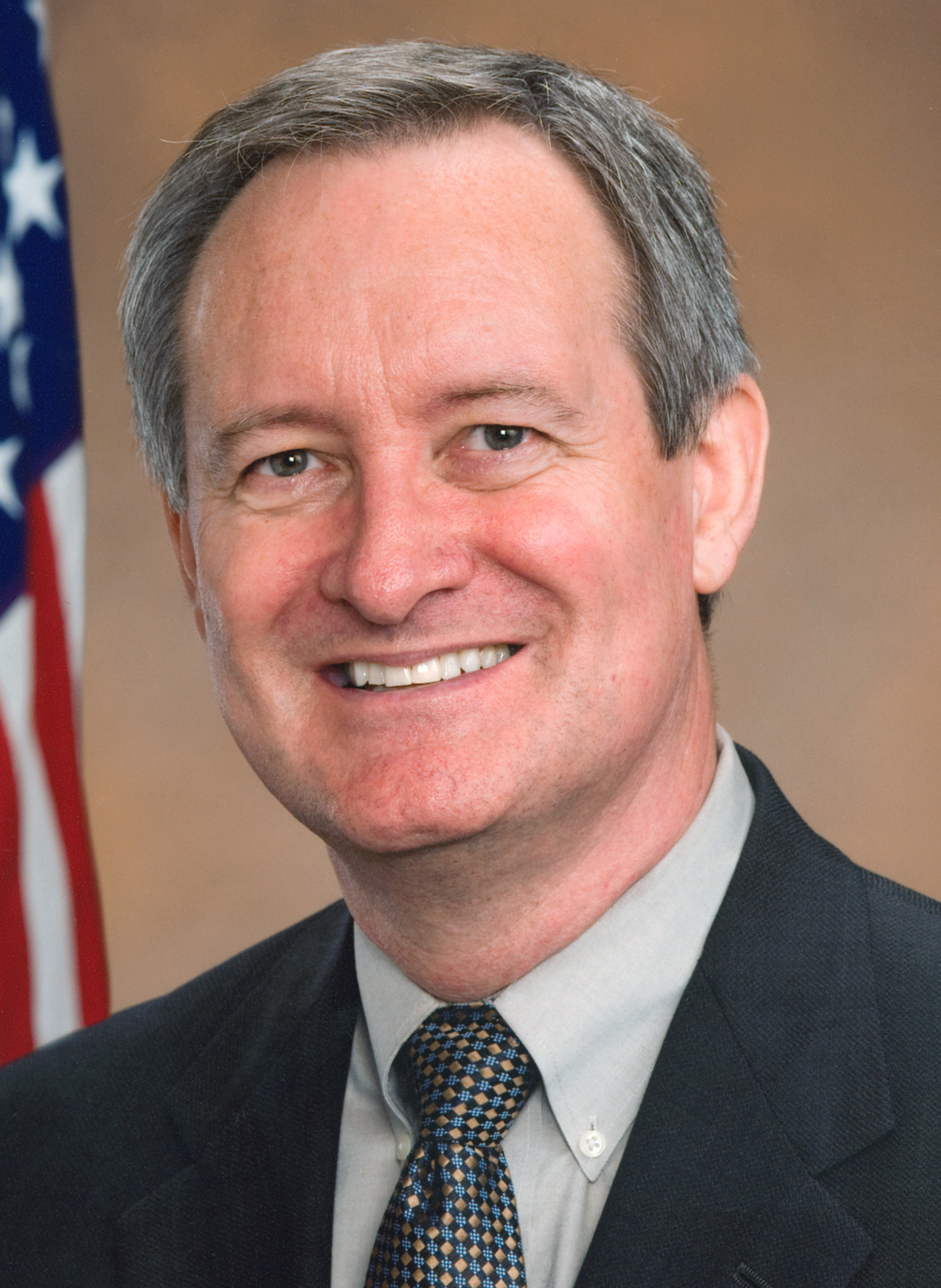

Nominee	Mike Crapo	Jerry Sturgill	Ray Writz
Party	Republican	Democratic	Constitution
Popular vote	449,017	188,249	41,677
Percentage	66.13%	27.73%	6.14%
- Crapo: 40–50% 50–60% 60–70% 70–80% 80–90% >90% Sturgill: 40–50% 50–60% 60–70% 70–80% No data
U.S. senator before election
Mike Crapo
Republican
Elected U.S. Senator
Mike Crapo
Republican

The 2016 United States Senate election in Idaho was held November 8, 2016, to elect a member of the United States Senate to represent the State of Idaho, concurrently with the 2016 U.S. presidential election, as well as other elections to the United States Senate in other states and elections to the United States House of Representatives and various state and local elections. The primaries were held May 17.

Incumbent Republican Senator Mike Crapo won re-election to a fourth term in office.

== Republican primary ==
=== Candidates ===
==== Declared ====
- Mike Crapo, incumbent U.S. Senator

==== Declined ====
- Russ Fulcher, former state senator and candidate for governor in 2014
- Raúl Labrador, U.S. Representative
- Mike Simpson, U.S. Representative

=== Results ===
Republican primary results
Party	Candidate	Votes	%
Republican	Mike Crapo (incumbent)	119,633	100.00%
Total votes		119,633	100.00%

== Democratic primary ==
=== Candidates ===
==== Declared ====
- Jerry Sturgill, businessman

==== Declined ====
- Richard H. Stallings, former U.S. Representative, former chairman of the Idaho Democratic Party and nominee for U.S. Senate in 1992
- Larry LaRocco, former U.S. Representative, nominee for lieutenant governor in 2006 and nominee for U.S. Senate in 2008
- Walt Minnick, former U.S. Representative and nominee for U.S. Senate in 1996

=== Results ===
Democratic primary results
Party	Candidate	Votes	%
Democratic	Jerry Sturgill	26,471	100.00%
Total votes		26,471	100.00%

== Third Party and Independent Candidates ==
=== Constitution Party ===
==== Declared ====
- Pro-Life (formerly known as Marvin Richardson), organic strawberry farmer, anti-abortion activist and perennial candidate
- Ray Writz

==== Results ====
Results by county: Writz: Writz—100%; Writz—80–90%; Writz—70–80%; Writz—60–70%; Writz—50–60%; Writz/Pro-Life tie: Writz & Pro-Life tie—50%; Pro-Life: Pro-Life—50–60%; Pro-Life—60–70%; Pro-Life—100%; No votes: No votes

Constitution primary results
Party	Candidate	Votes	%
Constitution	Ray J. Writz	131	59.5%
Constitution	Pro-Life	89	40.5%
Total votes		220	100.0%

== Independents ==
=== Candidates ===
==== Withdrawn ====
- Timothy Raty, paralegal and 2004 Libertarian State House candidate

== General election ==
=== Debates ===
Dates	Location	Crapo	Sturgill	Link
October 23, 2016	Boise, Idaho	Participant	Participant	

=== Polling ===
View source data.

Poll source	Date(s) administered	Sample size	Margin of error	Mike Crapo (R)	Jerry Sturgill (D)	Ray Writz (C)	Other	Undecided
SurveyMonkey	November 1–7, 2016	612	± 4.6%	58%	39%	—	—	3%
SurveyMonkey	October 31–November 6, 2016	557	± 4.6%	58%	36%	—	—	4%
SurveyMonkey	October 28–November 3, 2016	498	± 4.6%	61%	35%	—	—	4%
SurveyMonkey	October 27–November 2, 2016	442	± 4.6%	60%	34%	—	—	6%
SurveyMonkey	October 26–November 1, 2016	394	± 4.6%	61%	32%	—	—	7%
SurveyMonkey	October 25–31, 2016	447	± 4.6%	61%	34%	—	—	5%
Emerson College	October 21–23, 2016	1,023	± 3.0%	57%	24%	—	12%	7%
Dan Jones & Associates	August 18–31, 2016	602	± 4.0%	57%	20%	4%	4%	15%
Dan Jones & Associates	July 5–16, 2016	601	± 4.0%	57%	20%	4%	4%	15%
Lake Research Partners	July 5–10, 2016	500	± 4.4%	37%	35%	2%	—	25%
Dan Jones & Associates	May 18–June 4, 2016	603	± 4.0%	48%	25%	7%	9%	10%
Dan Jones & Associates	April 8–19, 2016	603	± 4.0%	53%	17%	5%	5%	20%

=== Predictions ===
Source	Ranking	As of
The Cook Political Report	Safe R	November 2, 2016
Sabato's Crystal Ball	Safe R	November 7, 2016
Rothenberg Political Report	Safe R	November 3, 2016
Daily Kos	Safe R	November 8, 2016
Real Clear Politics	Safe R	November 7, 2016

=== Results ===
United States Senate election in Idaho, 2016
Party	Candidate	Votes	%	±%
Republican	Mike Crapo (incumbent)	449,017	66.13%	−5.06%
Democratic	Jerry Sturgill	188,249	27.73%	+2.80%
Constitution	Ray J. Writz	41,677	6.14%	+2.26%
Majority		260,768	38.41%	−7.84%
Total votes		678,943	100.0%	N/A
Republican hold				

==== Counties that flipped from Republican to Democratic ====
- Blaine (largest municipality: Hailey)

==== By congressional district ====
Crapo won both congressional districts.

District	Crapo	Sturgill	Representative
1st	69%	25%	Raúl Labrador
2nd	63%	30%	Mike Simpson
