= Terry Crapo =

American politician

Majority Leader of the Idaho House of Representatives
- In office 1968–1972

Member of the Idaho House of Representatives
- In office 1966–1972

Personal details
- Born: December 7, 1939 Idaho Falls, Idaho, U.S.
- Died: September 1, 1982 (aged 42) Salt Lake City, Utah, U.S.
- Party: Republican

Terry Lavelle Crapo (July 2, 1939 – September 1, 1982) was an American attorney, educator, and Republican Party politician who served in the Idaho House of Representatives for six years, and as majority leader from 1968 to 1972. He led the legislature to make Idaho the first state to adopt the Uniform Probate Code. He died from leukemia ten years after retiring from the Idaho House.

A practicing attorney in Idaho Falls, Idaho, who became a partner with his firm Holden Kidwell Hahn & Crapo, he also taught estate law at Brigham Young University for several years as a visiting professor. After his death, his younger brother Mike Crapo, also an attorney, entered politics, ultimately serving as a United States senator from Idaho.

== Biography ==
Terry L. Crapo was the oldest of four brothers and two sisters in a large Mormon family and attended local schools. He was 12 years older than his brother Michael Crapo. He earned both his B.A. with highest honors and an M.A. degree at Brigham Young University in 1960. He went east to study law, graduating from Harvard Law School in 1963. He graduated second in his class, and served as associate editor of the Harvard Law Review.

Crapo returned to Idaho to practice law, settling in Idaho Falls, where he joined what became Holden Kidwell Hahn & Crapo (his younger brother Michael also joined the firm). It is one of the largest and oldest firms in eastern Idaho, established by four Holden brothers in 1896.

Terry Crapo married and had a family. He became a Republican Party member and continued in the Church of Jesus Christ of Latter-day Saints. He entered politics in Idaho Falls.

In 1966 through 1972, Crapo served in the Idaho State House, where he was elected as Majority Leader and serving from 1968 through 1972. He led Idaho to be the first state to enact the Uniform Probate Code.

In 1974 Crapo began as a visiting professor at Brigham Young University, teaching classes in estate planning: document drafting, wills, federal estate and gift tax, and advance estate planning. He continued to teach at BYU until his death from leukemia in 1982.

== Professional associations ==
He was a member of the Idaho State Bar, the American Bar Association, the American Law Institute, and a Fellow of the American College of Probate Counsel.

== Legacy ==
After Terry's death, his younger brother Michael Crapo entered politics, being elected to the State Senate in 1984. He was elected as a US Congressman and, in 1998, as United States Senator from Idaho.

== Works ==
- Idaho Estate Planning Forms
- Idaho Probate System
