= Richard Stallings =

American politician (1940–2025)

Dick Stallings
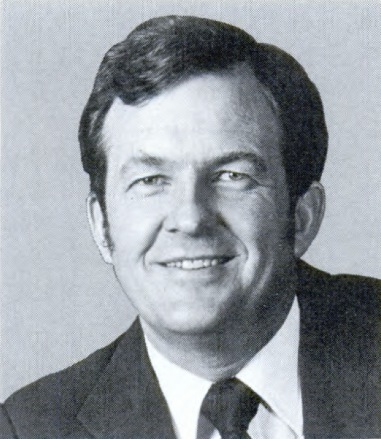

Chair of the Idaho Democratic Party
- In office March 2005 – December 20, 2007
- Preceded by: Bill Mauk
- Succeeded by: R. Keith Roark

United States Nuclear Waste Negotiator
- In office 1993–1995
- President: Bill Clinton
- Preceded by: David H. Leroy
- Succeeded by: Position abolished

Member of the U.S. House of Representatives from Idaho's 2nd district
- In office January 3, 1985 – January 3, 1993
- Preceded by: George V. Hansen
- Succeeded by: Mike Crapo

Personal details
- Born: Richard Howard Stallings; October 7, 1940 Ogden, Utah, U.S.
- Died: October 26, 2025 (aged 85) Pocatello, Idaho, U.S.
- Party: Democratic
- Spouses: Ranae Garner (m. 1963; died 2015); Rebecca Richards (m. 2018)
- Children: 3
- Education: Weber State University (BS); Utah State University (MS); Colorado College (attended)

Richard Howard Stallings (October 7, 1940 – October 26, 2025) was an American politician who served as a member of the United States House of Representatives for Idaho's 2nd congressional district from 1985 to 1993.

== Early life and education ==
Richard Stallings was born in Ogden, Utah, to Howard and Elizabeth (née Austin) Stallings in 1940. Richard was raised in Ogden along with his younger sister, Marilyn. He grew up active in Scouting, earning the rank of Eagle Scout at age 16, and a year later the Silver Award. Stallings was a graduate of the Ben Lomond High School class of 1958. He served as a missionary for The Church of Jesus Christ of Latter-day Saints in New Zealand from 1960 to 1962. He earned a Bachelor of Science in history and political science from Weber State College, then went on to earn a Master of Science in history from Utah State University, having fulfilled a portion of his Master's studies at Colorado College.

== Career ==
Stallings taught history at Brigham Young University–Idaho in Rexburg, Idaho from 1969 until his election to Congress in 1984.

=== U.S. House of Representatives ===
Idaho Democrats nominated Stallings to challenge four-term Republican incumbent George V. Hansen in 1982, but he lost in the general election. In 1984, after Hansen was censured by the House of Representatives, Stallings defeated him in a hotly contested race by fewer than 200 votes. Despite representing a heavily Republican district, Stallings was re-elected three times.

A conservative Democrat, Stallings unexpectedly received three votes for the presidential nomination from anti-abortion delegates at the 1988 Democratic National Convention.

=== Senate campaign ===
Stallings was the Democratic nominee in 1992 for an open seat in the United States Senate, but lost to Dirk Kempthorne, the popular two-term mayor of Boise.

=== Clinton administration ===
In 1993, Stallings was appointed United States Nuclear Waste Negotiator by President Bill Clinton and served in that capacity until the office was eliminated in early 1995.

=== Later career ===
Stallings attempted to win his old House seat back in 1998, but was defeated by state house Speaker Mike Simpson of Blackfoot in the general election. The seat was open, as three-term incumbent Mike Crapo successfully ran for an open seat in the U.S. Senate.

After leaving Congress, Stallings later served as executive director of the Pocatello Neighborhood Housing Services and later on the Pocatello, Idaho, City Council from 2001 to December 20, 2007.

==== Idaho Democratic Party Chair ====
In 2005, Stallings won election as chairman of the Idaho Democratic Party. Stallings was re-elected state Democratic chair in 2007. Stallings resigned on December 20, 2007.

==== 2014 congressional campaign ====
On March 14, 2014, Stallings filed to run as the Democratic candidate for his old U.S. House seat in Idaho's Second Congressional District. He was the Democratic nominee after the uncontested primary election, but was defeated by Simpson in the general election.

== Personal life and death ==
Stallings and his first wife Ranae Garner, who died in 2015, met while classmates at Weber State College. The couple were married in 1963 in the Salt Lake Temple in a ceremony officiated by Spencer W. Kimball.

In 2018, Stallings met, and in the same year married his second wife, Rebecca "Becci" Richards. Becci is the granddaughter of Latter-day Saint apostle, LeGrand Richards, and is also the matriarch of the Jacobs family of entertainers, whose work spans decades of film and television, as well as being the creators of Yo Gabba Gabba! and The Aquabats!. Becci stayed by Richard's side for seven more years until his death.

Stallings died in Pocatello, Idaho, on October 26, 2025, at the age of 85.

U.S. House of Representatives
Preceded by George V. Hansen	Member of the U.S. House of Representatives from Idaho's 2nd congressional district 1985–1993	Succeeded by Mike Crapo
Party political offices
Preceded by John Evans	Democratic nominee for U.S. Senator from Idaho (Class 3); 1992	Succeeded by Bill Mauk
Preceded by Bill Mauk	Chair of the Idaho Democratic Party; 2005–2007	Succeeded by R. Keith Roark
