= List of United States senators from Idaho =

Current delegation

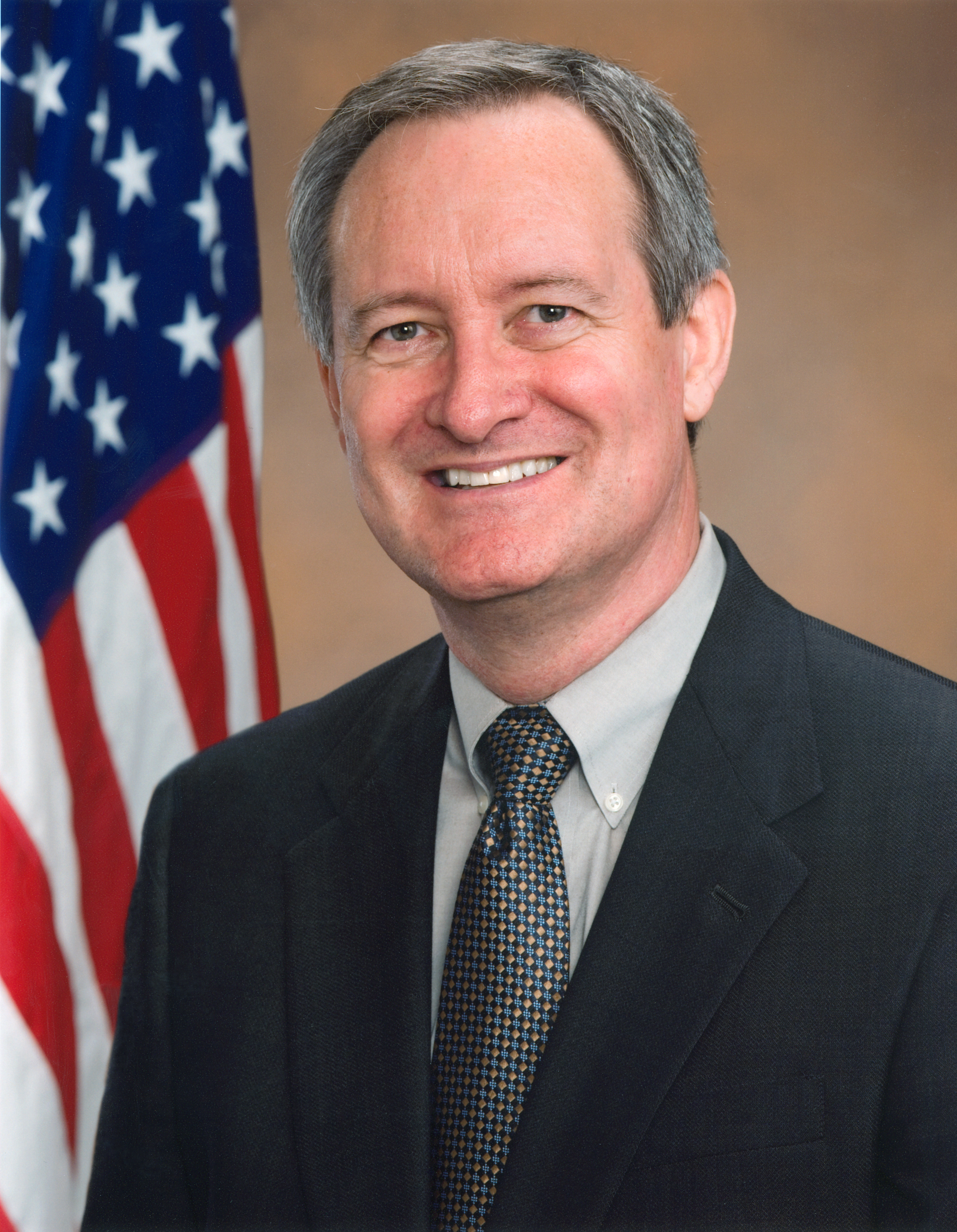
Mike Crapo (R)

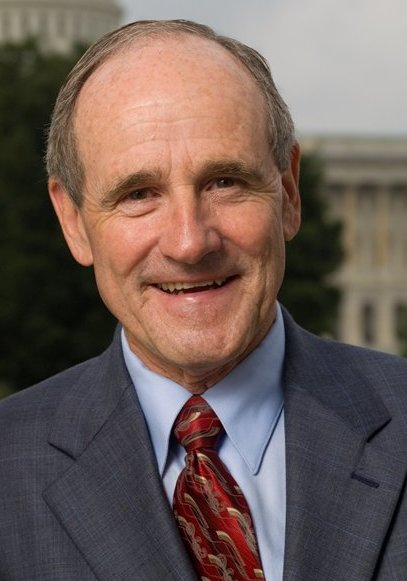
Jim Risch (R)

(ordered by seniority)

Below is a chronological listing of the United States senators from Idaho. The state was admitted to the Union on July 3, 1890, and its U.S. senators belong to class 2 and class 3. Idaho's current U.S. senators are Republicans Mike Crapo (serving since 1999) and Jim Risch (serving since 2009). William Borah was Idaho's longest-serving senator (1907–1940).

Both seats have been occupied by the Republicans since 1981.

== List of senators ==
Class 2 Class 2 senators belong to the electoral cycle that most recently had regular elections in 2008, 2014, 2020, and 2026. The next election will be in 2032.						C	Class 3 Class 3 senators belong to the electoral cycle that most recently had regular elections in 2004, 2010, 2016, and 2022. The next election will be in 2028.					
#	Senator	Party	Dates in office	Electoral history	T	C	T	Electoral history	Dates in office	Party	Senator	#
Vacant			Jul 3, 1890 – Dec 18, 1890	After joining the Union, Idaho did not elect its senators for six months.	1	51st	1	After joining the Union, Idaho did not elect its senators for six months.	Jul 3, 1890 – Dec 18, 1890	Vacant		
1	George Shoup (Boise)	Republican	Dec 18, 1890 – Mar 3, 1901	Elected in 1890.	1	51st	1	Elected in 1890. Retired.	Dec 18, 1890 – Mar 3, 1891	Republican	William McConnell (Moscow)	1
1	George Shoup (Boise)	Republican	Dec 18, 1890 – Mar 3, 1901	Elected in 1890.	1	52nd	2	Elected in 1890. Lost re-election as a Silver Republican.	Mar 4, 1891 – Mar 3, 1897	Republican	Fred Dubois (Blackfoot)	2
1	George Shoup (Boise)	Republican	Dec 18, 1890 – Mar 3, 1901	Elected in 1890.	1	53rd	2	Elected in 1890. Lost re-election as a Silver Republican.	Mar 4, 1891 – Mar 3, 1897	Republican	Fred Dubois (Blackfoot)	2
1	George Shoup (Boise)	Republican	Dec 18, 1890 – Mar 3, 1901	Re-elected in 1895. Lost re-election.	2	54th	2	Elected in 1890. Lost re-election as a Silver Republican.	Mar 4, 1891 – Mar 3, 1897	Republican	Fred Dubois (Blackfoot)	2
1	George Shoup (Boise)	Republican	Dec 18, 1890 – Mar 3, 1901	Re-elected in 1895. Lost re-election.	2	55th	3	Elected in 1897. Retired.	Mar 4, 1897 – Mar 3, 1903	Populist	Henry Heitfeld (Lewiston)	3
1	George Shoup (Boise)	Republican	Dec 18, 1890 – Mar 3, 1901	Re-elected in 1895. Lost re-election.	2	56th	3	Elected in 1897. Retired.	Mar 4, 1897 – Mar 3, 1903	Populist	Henry Heitfeld (Lewiston)	3
2	Fred Dubois (Blackfoot)	Silver Republican	Mar 4, 1901 – Mar 3, 1907	Elected in 1901 as a Silver Republican, but changed party to Democratic. Lost re-election.	3	57th	3	Elected in 1897. Retired.	Mar 4, 1897 – Mar 3, 1903	Populist	Henry Heitfeld (Lewiston)	3
2	Fred Dubois (Blackfoot)	Democratic	Mar 4, 1901 – Mar 3, 1907	Elected in 1901 as a Silver Republican, but changed party to Democratic. Lost re-election.	3	57th	3	Elected in 1897. Retired.	Mar 4, 1897 – Mar 3, 1903	Populist	Henry Heitfeld (Lewiston)	3
2	Fred Dubois (Blackfoot)	Democratic	Mar 4, 1901 – Mar 3, 1907	Elected in 1901 as a Silver Republican, but changed party to Democratic. Lost re-election.	3	58th	4	Elected in 1903.	Mar 4, 1903 – Oct 17, 1912	Republican	Weldon Heyburn (Wallace)	4
2	Fred Dubois (Blackfoot)	Democratic	Mar 4, 1901 – Mar 3, 1907	Elected in 1901 as a Silver Republican, but changed party to Democratic. Lost re-election.	3	59th	4	Elected in 1903.	Mar 4, 1903 – Oct 17, 1912	Republican	Weldon Heyburn (Wallace)	4
3	William Borah (Boise)	Republican	Mar 4, 1907 – Jan 19, 1940	Elected in 1907.	4	60th	4	Elected in 1903.	Mar 4, 1903 – Oct 17, 1912	Republican	Weldon Heyburn (Wallace)	4
3	William Borah (Boise)	Republican	Mar 4, 1907 – Jan 19, 1940	Elected in 1907.	4	61st	5	Re-elected in 1909. Died.	Mar 4, 1903 – Oct 17, 1912	Republican	Weldon Heyburn (Wallace)	4
3	William Borah (Boise)	Republican	Mar 4, 1907 – Jan 19, 1940	Elected in 1907.	4	62nd	5	Re-elected in 1909. Died.	Mar 4, 1903 – Oct 17, 1912	Republican	Weldon Heyburn (Wallace)	4
3	William Borah (Boise)	Republican	Mar 4, 1907 – Jan 19, 1940	Elected in 1907.	4	62nd	5		Oct 17, 1912 – Nov 18, 1912	Vacant		
3	William Borah (Boise)	Republican	Mar 4, 1907 – Jan 19, 1940	Elected in 1907.	4	62nd	5	Appointed to continue Heyburn's term. Lost election to finish Heyburn's term.	Nov 18, 1912 – Feb 6, 1913	Democratic	Kirtland Perky (Boise)	5
3	William Borah (Boise)	Republican	Mar 4, 1907 – Jan 19, 1940	Elected in 1907.	4	62nd	5	Elected in 1913 to finish Heyburn's term.	Feb 6, 1913 – Jan 13, 1918	Republican	James Brady (Pocatello)	6
3	William Borah (Boise)	Republican	Mar 4, 1907 – Jan 19, 1940	Re-elected in 1913.	5	63rd	5	Elected in 1913 to finish Heyburn's term.	Feb 6, 1913 – Jan 13, 1918	Republican	James Brady (Pocatello)	6
3	William Borah (Boise)	Republican	Mar 4, 1907 – Jan 19, 1940	Re-elected in 1913.	5	64th	6	Re-elected in 1914. Died.	Feb 6, 1913 – Jan 13, 1918	Republican	James Brady (Pocatello)	6
3	William Borah (Boise)	Republican	Mar 4, 1907 – Jan 19, 1940	Re-elected in 1913.	5	65th	6	Re-elected in 1914. Died.	Feb 6, 1913 – Jan 13, 1918	Republican	James Brady (Pocatello)	6
3	William Borah (Boise)	Republican	Mar 4, 1907 – Jan 19, 1940	Re-elected in 1913.	5	65th	6		Jan 13, 1918 – Jan 22, 1918	Vacant		
3	William Borah (Boise)	Republican	Mar 4, 1907 – Jan 19, 1940	Re-elected in 1913.	5	65th	6	Appointed to continue Brady's term. Elected in 1918 to finish Brady's term. Resigned to become a Federal Trade Commissioner, having lost election to a full term.	Jan 22, 1918 – Jan 14, 1921	Democratic	John F. Nugent (Boise)	7
3	William Borah (Boise)	Republican	Mar 4, 1907 – Jan 19, 1940	Re-elected in 1918	6	66th	6	Appointed to continue Brady's term. Elected in 1918 to finish Brady's term. Resigned to become a Federal Trade Commissioner, having lost election to a full term.	Jan 22, 1918 – Jan 14, 1921	Democratic	John F. Nugent (Boise)	7
3	William Borah (Boise)	Republican	Mar 4, 1907 – Jan 19, 1940	Re-elected in 1918	6	66th	6	Appointed to finish Brady's term, having been elected to the next term.	Jan 15, 1921 – Jun 24, 1928	Republican	Frank Gooding (Gooding)	8
3	William Borah (Boise)	Republican	Mar 4, 1907 – Jan 19, 1940	Re-elected in 1918	6	67th	7	Elected to full term in 1920.	Jan 15, 1921 – Jun 24, 1928	Republican	Frank Gooding (Gooding)	8
3	William Borah (Boise)	Republican	Mar 4, 1907 – Jan 19, 1940	Re-elected in 1918	6	68th	7	Elected to full term in 1920.	Jan 15, 1921 – Jun 24, 1928	Republican	Frank Gooding (Gooding)	8
3	William Borah (Boise)	Republican	Mar 4, 1907 – Jan 19, 1940	Re-elected in 1924.	7	69th	7	Elected to full term in 1920.	Jan 15, 1921 – Jun 24, 1928	Republican	Frank Gooding (Gooding)	8
3	William Borah (Boise)	Republican	Mar 4, 1907 – Jan 19, 1940	Re-elected in 1924.	7	70th	8	Re-elected in 1926. Died.	Jan 15, 1921 – Jun 24, 1928	Republican	Frank Gooding (Gooding)	8
3	William Borah (Boise)	Republican	Mar 4, 1907 – Jan 19, 1940	Re-elected in 1924.	7	70th	8		Jun 24, 1928 – Jun 30, 1928	Vacant		
3	William Borah (Boise)	Republican	Mar 4, 1907 – Jan 19, 1940	Re-elected in 1924.	7	70th	8	Appointed to continue Gooding's term. Elected in 1928 to finish Gooding's term. Lost re-election.	Jun 30, 1928 – Mar 3, 1933	Republican	John Thomas (Gooding)	9
3	William Borah (Boise)	Republican	Mar 4, 1907 – Jan 19, 1940	Re-elected in 1924.	7	71st	8	Appointed to continue Gooding's term. Elected in 1928 to finish Gooding's term. Lost re-election.	Jun 30, 1928 – Mar 3, 1933	Republican	John Thomas (Gooding)	9
3	William Borah (Boise)	Republican	Mar 4, 1907 – Jan 19, 1940	Re-elected in 1930.	8	72nd	8	Appointed to continue Gooding's term. Elected in 1928 to finish Gooding's term. Lost re-election.	Jun 30, 1928 – Mar 3, 1933	Republican	John Thomas (Gooding)	9
3	William Borah (Boise)	Republican	Mar 4, 1907 – Jan 19, 1940	Re-elected in 1930.	8	73rd	9	Elected in 1932. Lost renomination.	Mar 4, 1933 – Jan 3, 1939	Democratic	James P. Pope (Boise)	10
3	William Borah (Boise)	Republican	Mar 4, 1907 – Jan 19, 1940	Re-elected in 1930.	8	74th	9	Elected in 1932. Lost renomination.	Mar 4, 1933 – Jan 3, 1939	Democratic	James P. Pope (Boise)	10
3	William Borah (Boise)	Republican	Mar 4, 1907 – Jan 19, 1940	Re-elected in 1936. Died.	9	75th	9	Elected in 1932. Lost renomination.	Mar 4, 1933 – Jan 3, 1939	Democratic	James P. Pope (Boise)	10
3	William Borah (Boise)	Republican	Mar 4, 1907 – Jan 19, 1940	Re-elected in 1936. Died.	9	76th	10	Elected in 1938. Lost renomination.	Jan 3, 1939 – Jan 3, 1945	Democratic	D. Worth Clark (Pocatello)	11
Vacant			Jan 19, 1940 – Jan 27, 1940		9	76th	10	Elected in 1938. Lost renomination.	Jan 3, 1939 – Jan 3, 1945	Democratic	D. Worth Clark (Pocatello)	11
4	John Thomas (Gooding)	Republican	Jan 27, 1940 – Nov 10, 1945	Appointed to continue Borah's term. Elected in 1940 to finish Borah's term.	9	76th	10	Elected in 1938. Lost renomination.	Jan 3, 1939 – Jan 3, 1945	Democratic	D. Worth Clark (Pocatello)	11
4	John Thomas (Gooding)	Republican	Jan 27, 1940 – Nov 10, 1945	Appointed to continue Borah's term. Elected in 1940 to finish Borah's term.	9	77th	10	Elected in 1938. Lost renomination.	Jan 3, 1939 – Jan 3, 1945	Democratic	D. Worth Clark (Pocatello)	11
4	John Thomas (Gooding)	Republican	Jan 27, 1940 – Nov 10, 1945	Re-elected in 1942. Died.	10	78th	10	Elected in 1938. Lost renomination.	Jan 3, 1939 – Jan 3, 1945	Democratic	D. Worth Clark (Pocatello)	11
4	John Thomas (Gooding)	Republican	Jan 27, 1940 – Nov 10, 1945	Re-elected in 1942. Died.	10	79th	11	Elected in 1944. Lost renomination.	Jan 3, 1945 – Jan 3, 1951	Democratic	Glen H. Taylor (Pocatello)	12
Vacant			Nov 10, 1945 – Nov 17, 1945		10	79th	11	Elected in 1944. Lost renomination.	Jan 3, 1945 – Jan 3, 1951	Democratic	Glen H. Taylor (Pocatello)	12
5	Charles C. Gossett (Nampa)	Democratic	Nov 17, 1945 – Nov 5, 1946	Appointed to continue Thomas's term. Lost nomination to finish Thomas's term.	10	79th	11	Elected in 1944. Lost renomination.	Jan 3, 1945 – Jan 3, 1951	Democratic	Glen H. Taylor (Pocatello)	12
6	Henry Dworshak (Burley)	Republican	Nov 6, 1946 – Jan 3, 1949	Elected in 1946 to finish Thomas's term. Lost re-election.	10	79th	11	Elected in 1944. Lost renomination.	Jan 3, 1945 – Jan 3, 1951	Democratic	Glen H. Taylor (Pocatello)	12
6	Henry Dworshak (Burley)	Republican	Nov 6, 1946 – Jan 3, 1949	Elected in 1946 to finish Thomas's term. Lost re-election.	10	80th	11	Elected in 1944. Lost renomination.	Jan 3, 1945 – Jan 3, 1951	Democratic	Glen H. Taylor (Pocatello)	12
7	Bert H. Miller (Boise)	Democratic	Jan 3, 1949 – Oct 8, 1949	Elected in 1948. Died.	11	81st	11	Elected in 1944. Lost renomination.	Jan 3, 1945 – Jan 3, 1951	Democratic	Glen H. Taylor (Pocatello)	12
Vacant			Oct 8, 1949 – Oct 14, 1949		11	81st	11	Elected in 1944. Lost renomination.	Jan 3, 1945 – Jan 3, 1951	Democratic	Glen H. Taylor (Pocatello)	12
8	Henry Dworshak (Burley)	Republican	Oct 14, 1949 – Jul 23, 1962	Appointed to continue Miller's term. Elected in 1950 to finish Miller's term.	11	81st	11	Elected in 1944. Lost renomination.	Jan 3, 1945 – Jan 3, 1951	Democratic	Glen H. Taylor (Pocatello)	12
8	Henry Dworshak (Burley)	Republican	Oct 14, 1949 – Jul 23, 1962	Appointed to continue Miller's term. Elected in 1950 to finish Miller's term.	11	82nd	12	Elected in 1950. Lost re-election.	Jan 3, 1951 – Jan 3, 1957	Republican	Herman Welker (Payette)	13
8	Henry Dworshak (Burley)	Republican	Oct 14, 1949 – Jul 23, 1962	Appointed to continue Miller's term. Elected in 1950 to finish Miller's term.	11	83rd	12	Elected in 1950. Lost re-election.	Jan 3, 1951 – Jan 3, 1957	Republican	Herman Welker (Payette)	13
8	Henry Dworshak (Burley)	Republican	Oct 14, 1949 – Jul 23, 1962	Re-elected in 1954	12	84th	12	Elected in 1950. Lost re-election.	Jan 3, 1951 – Jan 3, 1957	Republican	Herman Welker (Payette)	13
8	Henry Dworshak (Burley)	Republican	Oct 14, 1949 – Jul 23, 1962	Re-elected in 1954	12	85th	13	Elected in 1956.	Jan 3, 1957 – Jan 3, 1981	Democratic	Frank Church (Boise)	14
8	Henry Dworshak (Burley)	Republican	Oct 14, 1949 – Jul 23, 1962	Re-elected in 1954	12	86th	13	Elected in 1956.	Jan 3, 1957 – Jan 3, 1981	Democratic	Frank Church (Boise)	14
8	Henry Dworshak (Burley)	Republican	Oct 14, 1949 – Jul 23, 1962	Re-elected in 1960. Died.	13	87th	13	Elected in 1956.	Jan 3, 1957 – Jan 3, 1981	Democratic	Frank Church (Boise)	14
Vacant			Jul 23, 1962 – Aug 6, 1962		13	87th	13	Elected in 1956.	Jan 3, 1957 – Jan 3, 1981	Democratic	Frank Church (Boise)	14
9	Len Jordan (Boise)	Republican	Aug 6, 1962 – Jan 3, 1973	Appointed to continue Dworshak's term. Elected in 1962 to finish Dworshak's term.	13	87th	13	Elected in 1956.	Jan 3, 1957 – Jan 3, 1981	Democratic	Frank Church (Boise)	14
9	Len Jordan (Boise)	Republican	Aug 6, 1962 – Jan 3, 1973	Appointed to continue Dworshak's term. Elected in 1962 to finish Dworshak's term.	13	88th	14	Re-elected in 1962.	Jan 3, 1957 – Jan 3, 1981	Democratic	Frank Church (Boise)	14
9	Len Jordan (Boise)	Republican	Aug 6, 1962 – Jan 3, 1973	Appointed to continue Dworshak's term. Elected in 1962 to finish Dworshak's term.	13	89th	14	Re-elected in 1962.	Jan 3, 1957 – Jan 3, 1981	Democratic	Frank Church (Boise)	14
9	Len Jordan (Boise)	Republican	Aug 6, 1962 – Jan 3, 1973	Re-elected in 1966. Retired.	14	90th	14	Re-elected in 1962.	Jan 3, 1957 – Jan 3, 1981	Democratic	Frank Church (Boise)	14
9	Len Jordan (Boise)	Republican	Aug 6, 1962 – Jan 3, 1973	Re-elected in 1966. Retired.	14	91st	15	Re-elected in 1968.	Jan 3, 1957 – Jan 3, 1981	Democratic	Frank Church (Boise)	14
9	Len Jordan (Boise)	Republican	Aug 6, 1962 – Jan 3, 1973	Re-elected in 1966. Retired.	14	92nd	15	Re-elected in 1968.	Jan 3, 1957 – Jan 3, 1981	Democratic	Frank Church (Boise)	14
10	Jim McClure (McCall)	Republican	Jan 3, 1973 – Jan 3, 1991	Elected in 1972.	15	93rd	15	Re-elected in 1968.	Jan 3, 1957 – Jan 3, 1981	Democratic	Frank Church (Boise)	14
10	Jim McClure (McCall)	Republican	Jan 3, 1973 – Jan 3, 1991	Elected in 1972.	15	94th	16	Re-elected in 1974. Lost re-election.	Jan 3, 1957 – Jan 3, 1981	Democratic	Frank Church (Boise)	14
10	Jim McClure (McCall)	Republican	Jan 3, 1973 – Jan 3, 1991	Elected in 1972.	15	95th	16	Re-elected in 1974. Lost re-election.	Jan 3, 1957 – Jan 3, 1981	Democratic	Frank Church (Boise)	14
10	Jim McClure (McCall)	Republican	Jan 3, 1973 – Jan 3, 1991	Re-elected in 1978.	16	96th	16	Re-elected in 1974. Lost re-election.	Jan 3, 1957 – Jan 3, 1981	Democratic	Frank Church (Boise)	14
10	Jim McClure (McCall)	Republican	Jan 3, 1973 – Jan 3, 1991	Re-elected in 1978.	16	97th	17	Elected in 1980.	Jan 3, 1981 – Jan 3, 1993	Republican	Steve Symms (Caldwell)	15
10	Jim McClure (McCall)	Republican	Jan 3, 1973 – Jan 3, 1991	Re-elected in 1978.	16	98th	17	Elected in 1980.	Jan 3, 1981 – Jan 3, 1993	Republican	Steve Symms (Caldwell)	15
10	Jim McClure (McCall)	Republican	Jan 3, 1973 – Jan 3, 1991	Re-elected in 1984. Retired.	17	99th	17	Elected in 1980.	Jan 3, 1981 – Jan 3, 1993	Republican	Steve Symms (Caldwell)	15
10	Jim McClure (McCall)	Republican	Jan 3, 1973 – Jan 3, 1991	Re-elected in 1984. Retired.	17	100th	18	Re-elected in 1986. Retired.	Jan 3, 1981 – Jan 3, 1993	Republican	Steve Symms (Caldwell)	15
10	Jim McClure (McCall)	Republican	Jan 3, 1973 – Jan 3, 1991	Re-elected in 1984. Retired.	17	101st	18	Re-elected in 1986. Retired.	Jan 3, 1981 – Jan 3, 1993	Republican	Steve Symms (Caldwell)	15
11	Larry Craig (Payette)	Republican	Jan 3, 1991 – Jan 3, 2009	Elected in 1990.	18	102nd	18	Re-elected in 1986. Retired.	Jan 3, 1981 – Jan 3, 1993	Republican	Steve Symms (Caldwell)	15
11	Larry Craig (Payette)	Republican	Jan 3, 1991 – Jan 3, 2009	Elected in 1990.	18	103rd	19	Elected in 1992. Retired to run for Governor of Idaho.	Jan 3, 1993 – Jan 3, 1999	Republican	Dirk Kempthorne (Boise)	16
11	Larry Craig (Payette)	Republican	Jan 3, 1991 – Jan 3, 2009	Elected in 1990.	18	104th	19	Elected in 1992. Retired to run for Governor of Idaho.	Jan 3, 1993 – Jan 3, 1999	Republican	Dirk Kempthorne (Boise)	16
11	Larry Craig (Payette)	Republican	Jan 3, 1991 – Jan 3, 2009	Re-elected in 1996.	19	105th	19	Elected in 1992. Retired to run for Governor of Idaho.	Jan 3, 1993 – Jan 3, 1999	Republican	Dirk Kempthorne (Boise)	16
11	Larry Craig (Payette)	Republican	Jan 3, 1991 – Jan 3, 2009	Re-elected in 1996.	19	106th	20	Elected in 1998.	Jan 3, 1999 – present	Republican	Mike Crapo (Idaho Falls)	17
11	Larry Craig (Payette)	Republican	Jan 3, 1991 – Jan 3, 2009	Re-elected in 1996.	19	107th	20	Elected in 1998.	Jan 3, 1999 – present	Republican	Mike Crapo (Idaho Falls)	17
11	Larry Craig (Payette)	Republican	Jan 3, 1991 – Jan 3, 2009	Re-elected in 2002. Retired.	20	108th	20	Elected in 1998.	Jan 3, 1999 – present	Republican	Mike Crapo (Idaho Falls)	17
11	Larry Craig (Payette)	Republican	Jan 3, 1991 – Jan 3, 2009	Re-elected in 2002. Retired.	20	109th	21	Re-elected in 2004.	Jan 3, 1999 – present	Republican	Mike Crapo (Idaho Falls)	17
11	Larry Craig (Payette)	Republican	Jan 3, 1991 – Jan 3, 2009	Re-elected in 2002. Retired.	20	110th	21	Re-elected in 2004.	Jan 3, 1999 – present	Republican	Mike Crapo (Idaho Falls)	17
12	Jim Risch (Boise)	Republican	Jan 3, 2009 – present	Elected in 2008.	21	111th	21	Re-elected in 2004.	Jan 3, 1999 – present	Republican	Mike Crapo (Idaho Falls)	17
12	Jim Risch (Boise)	Republican	Jan 3, 2009 – present	Elected in 2008.	21	112th	22	Re-elected in 2010.	Jan 3, 1999 – present	Republican	Mike Crapo (Idaho Falls)	17
12	Jim Risch (Boise)	Republican	Jan 3, 2009 – present	Elected in 2008.	21	113th	22	Re-elected in 2010.	Jan 3, 1999 – present	Republican	Mike Crapo (Idaho Falls)	17
12	Jim Risch (Boise)	Republican	Jan 3, 2009 – present	Re-elected in 2014.	22	114th	22	Re-elected in 2010.	Jan 3, 1999 – present	Republican	Mike Crapo (Idaho Falls)	17
12	Jim Risch (Boise)	Republican	Jan 3, 2009 – present	Re-elected in 2014.	22	115th	23	Re-elected in 2016.	Jan 3, 1999 – present	Republican	Mike Crapo (Idaho Falls)	17
12	Jim Risch (Boise)	Republican	Jan 3, 2009 – present	Re-elected in 2014.	22	116th	23	Re-elected in 2016.	Jan 3, 1999 – present	Republican	Mike Crapo (Idaho Falls)	17
12	Jim Risch (Boise)	Republican	Jan 3, 2009 – present	Re-elected in 2020.	23	117th	23	Re-elected in 2016.	Jan 3, 1999 – present	Republican	Mike Crapo (Idaho Falls)	17
12	Jim Risch (Boise)	Republican	Jan 3, 2009 – present	Re-elected in 2020.	23	118th	24	Re-elected in 2022.	Jan 3, 1999 – present	Republican	Mike Crapo (Idaho Falls)	17
12	Jim Risch (Boise)	Republican	Jan 3, 2009 – present	Re-elected in 2020.	23	119th	24	Re-elected in 2022.	Jan 3, 1999 – present	Republican	Mike Crapo (Idaho Falls)	17
12	Jim Risch (Boise)	Republican	Jan 3, 2009 – present	Re-elected in 2026.	24	120th	24	Re-elected in 2022.	Jan 3, 1999 – present	Republican	Mike Crapo (Idaho Falls)	17
12	Jim Risch (Boise)	Republican	Jan 3, 2009 – present	Re-elected in 2026.	24	121st	25	To be determined in the 2028 election.				
12	Jim Risch (Boise)	Republican	Jan 3, 2009 – present	Re-elected in 2026.	24	122nd	25	To be determined in the 2028 election.				
To be determined in the 2032 election.					25	123rd	25	To be determined in the 2028 election.				

== See also ==
- Elections in Idaho
- Idaho's congressional delegations
- List of United States representatives from Idaho
