= Universal child care =

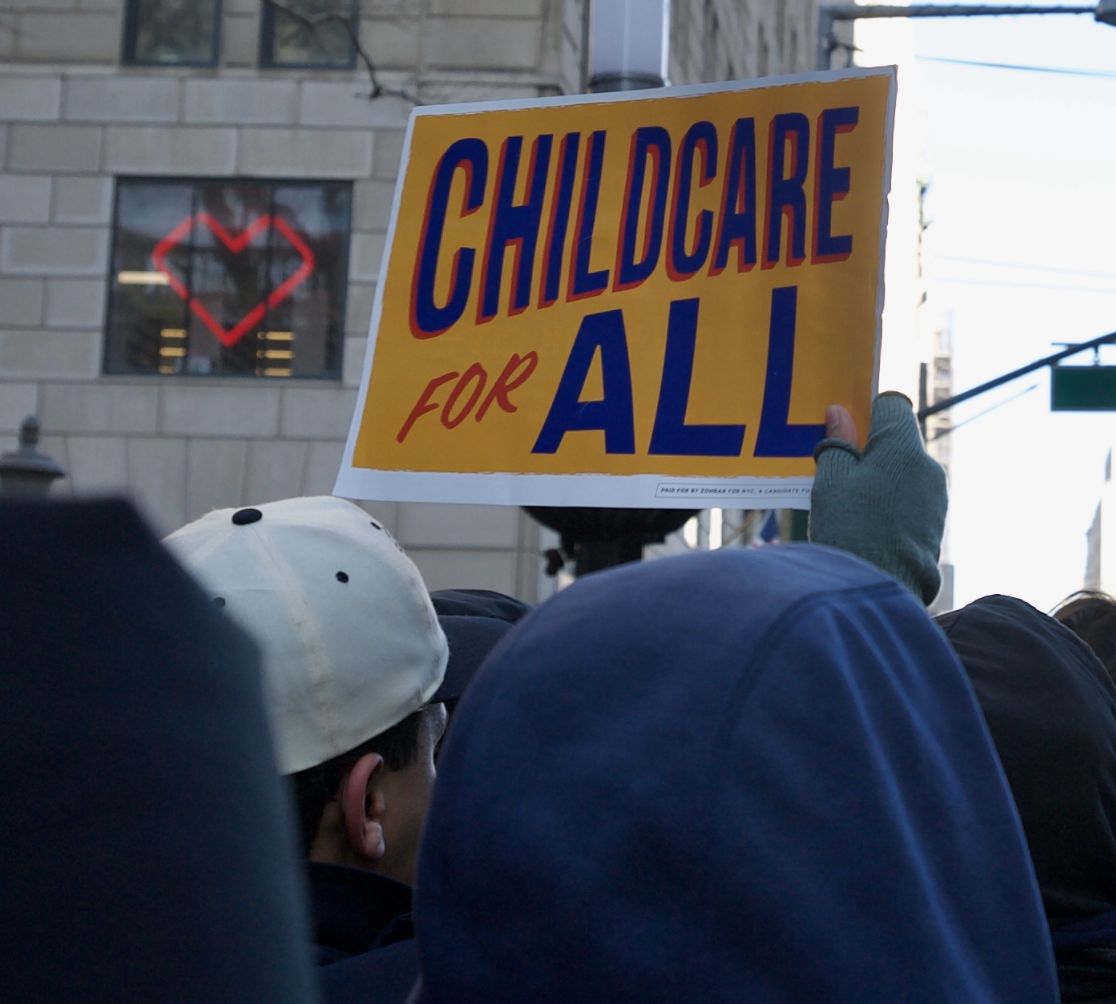
Sign advocating for universal childcare at Zohran Mamdani's mayoral inauguration

Universal child care is the provision of free or low-cost child care to all families, regardless of the ability to pay, through government subsidies. It generally encompasses daycare from the end of parental leave to the beginning of government-subsidized preschool or kindergarten. It may also include after-school care throughout primary education, allowing parents to work a full day.

Various countries have implemented universal child care; those with the highest subsidies are the Nordic countries and Germany.

== See also ==
Countries implementing:

- Child care in Canada
- Child care § By country

Related concepts:

- Universal preschool
- Universal health care
- Universal basic income
