= 1992 United States Senate election in Idaho =

- November 3, 1992
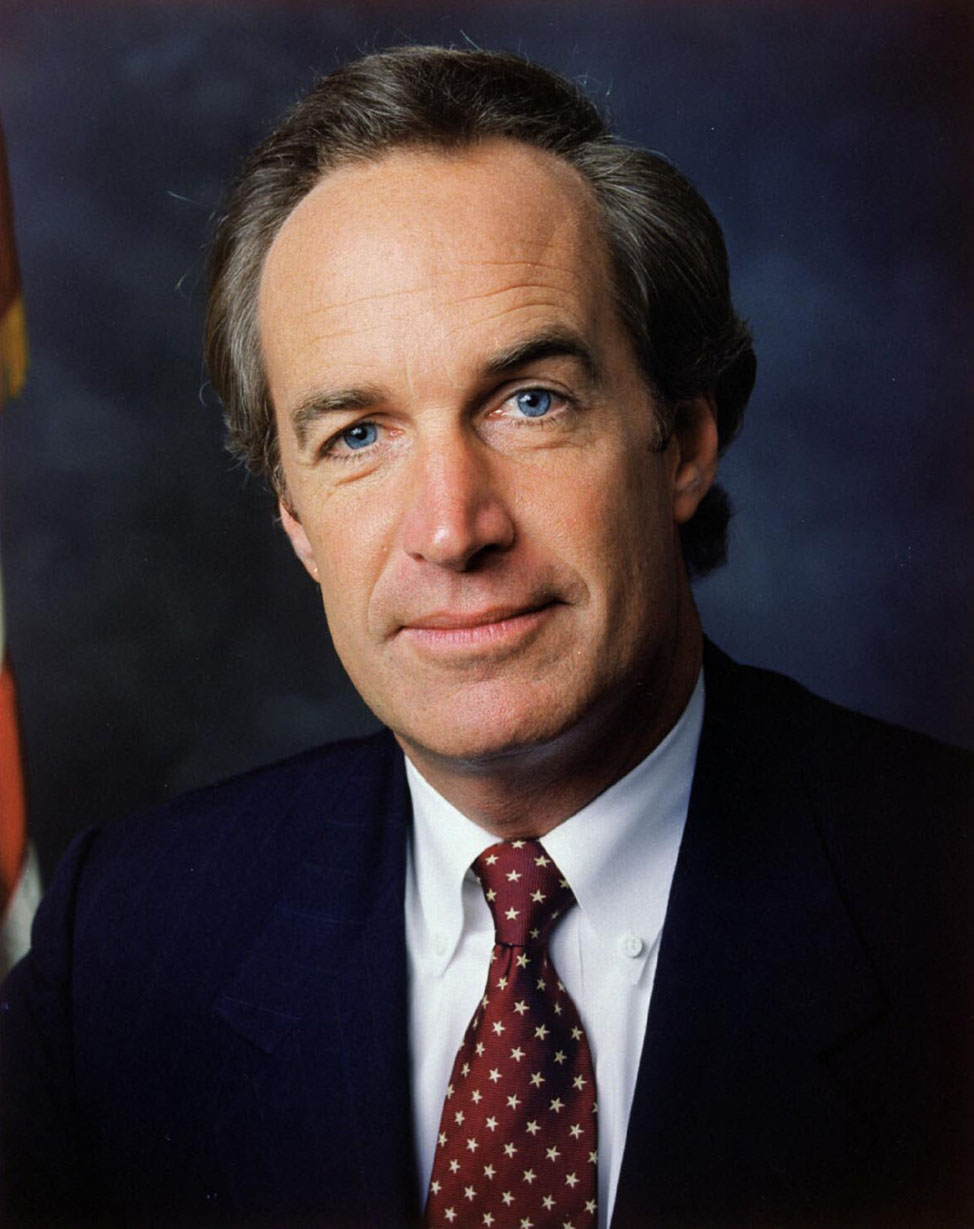

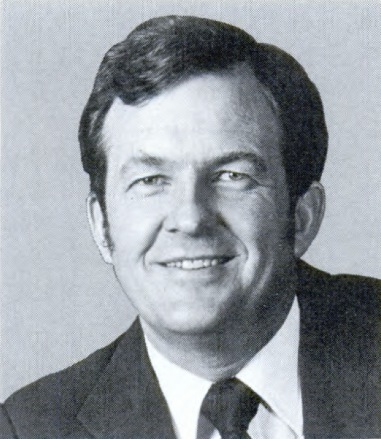
| Nominee | Dirk Kempthorne | Richard H. Stallings |
| Party | Republican | Democratic |
| Popular vote | 270,468 | 208,036 |
| Percentage | 56.52% | 43.48% |
- County results Kempthorne: 50–60% 60–70% Stallings: 50–60% 60–70%
U.S. senator before election
Steve Symms
Republican
Elected U.S. Senator
Dirk Kempthorne
Republican

The 1992 United States Senate election in Idaho took place on November 3, 1992, alongside other elections to the United States Senate in other states as well as elections to the United States House of Representatives and various state and local elections. Incumbent Republican U.S. Senator Steve Symms decided to retire instead of seeking a third term. Republican nominee and Boise mayor Dirk Kempthorne won the open seat, defeating Democratic Congressman Richard H. Stallings.

To date, Stallings' 43 percent is the last time that the Democrats have won more than 40 percent of the vote in a Senate election in Idaho.

Instead of seeking re-election in 1998, Kempthorne successfully ran for governor.

== Democratic primary ==
=== Candidates ===
- Richard H. Stallings, U.S. Representative
- Matt Schaffer
- David W. Sheperd

=== Results ===
Democratic primary results
| Party | Candidate | Votes | % |
|---|---|---|---|
| Democratic | Richard H. Stallings | 40,102 | 71.66% |
| Democratic | Matt Schaffer | 8,976 | 16.04% |
| Democratic | David W. Sheperd | 6,882 | 12.30% |
| Total votes | | 55,960 | 100.00% |

== Republican primary ==
=== Candidates ===
- Dirk Kempthorne, Mayor of Boise
- Rod Beck, former State Senator
- Milt Erhart

=== Results ===
Republican primary results
| Party | Candidate | Votes | % |
|---|---|---|---|
| Republican | Dirk Kempthorne | 67,001 | 57.43% |
| Republican | Rod Beck | 26,977 | 23.12% |
| Republican | Milt Erhart | 22,682 | 19.44% |
| Total votes | | 116,660 | 100.00% |

== General election ==
=== Candidates ===
- Dirk Kempthorne (R), Mayor of Boise
- Richard H. Stallings (D), U.S. Representative

=== Results ===
General election results
| Party | Candidate | Votes | % | ±% |
|---|---|---|---|---|
| Republican | Dirk Kempthorne | 270,468 | 56.52% | +4.97% |
| Democratic | Richard H. Stallings | 208,036 | 43.48% | −4.97% |
| Majority | | 62,432 | 13.05% | +9.93% |
| Turnout | | 478,504 | | +20.17% |
| Republican hold | | | | |

== See also ==
- 1992 United States Senate elections
