= 2004 United States Senate election in Idaho =

- November 2, 2004
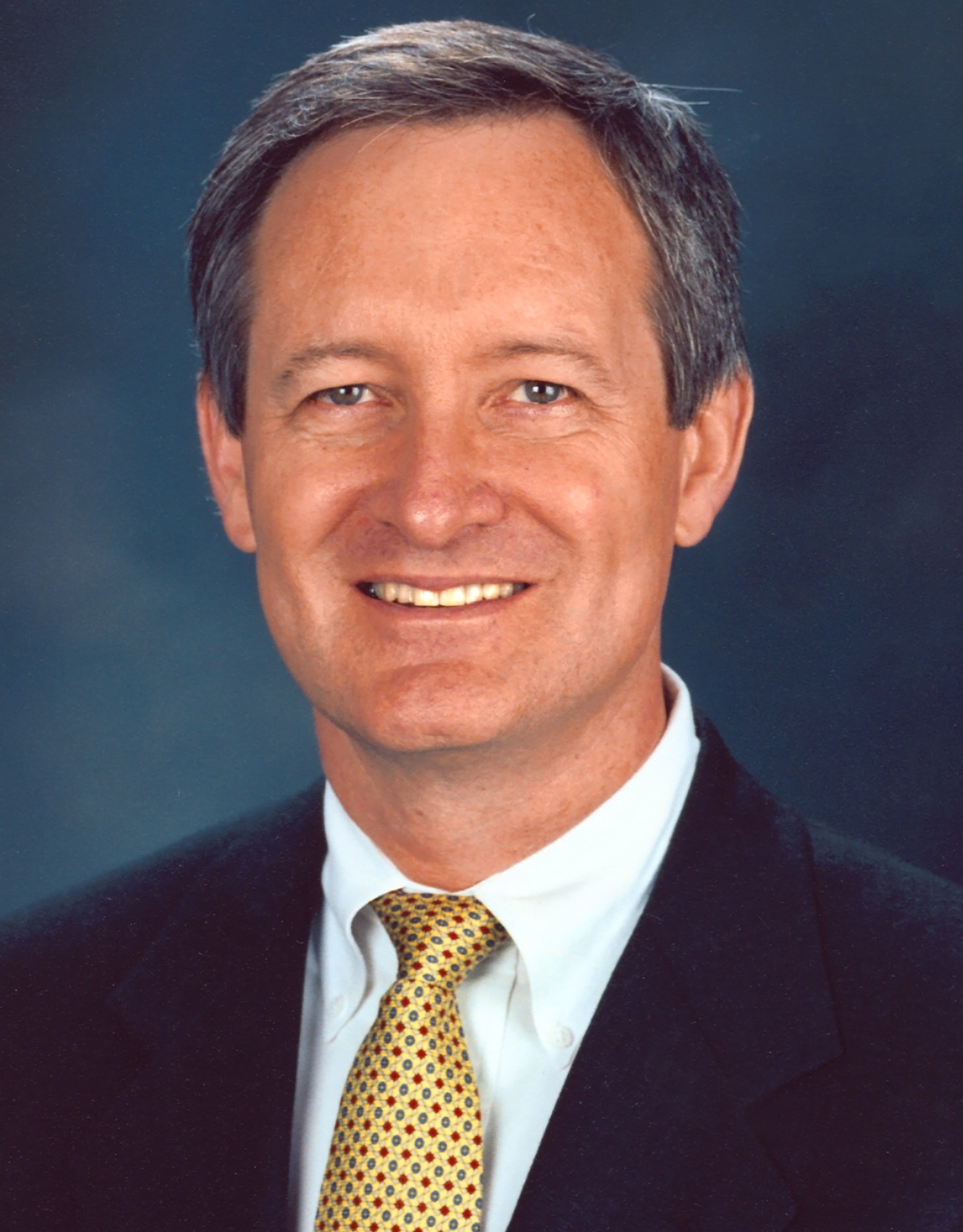

| Nominee | Mike Crapo | Scott McClure (write-in) |
| Party | Republican | Democratic |
| Popular vote | 499,796 | 4,136 |
| Percentage | 99.18% | 0.82% |
- Crapo: 80–90% 90–100% 100% No Votes
U.S. senator before election
Mike Crapo
Republican
Elected U.S. Senator
Mike Crapo
Republican

The 2004 United States Senate election in Idaho took place on November 2, 2004, alongside other elections to the United States Senate in other states as well as elections to the United States House of Representatives and various state and local elections. Incumbent Republican Senator Mike Crapo ran for and won a second term in office in a landslide, as he was the only voting option besides a write-in campaign. Democrat Scott McClure conducted a write-in campaign but only received 4,136 votes, or 0.82% of those cast.

== Republican primary ==
=== Candidates ===
- Mike Crapo, incumbent U.S. Senator

=== Results ===
Republican Party primary results
| Party | Candidate | Votes | % |
|---|---|---|---|
| Republican | Mike Crapo (incumbent) | 118,286 | 100.00% |
| Total votes | | 118,286 | 100.00% |

== General election ==
=== Candidates ===
On ballot

- Mike Crapo (R), incumbent U.S. Senator

Write-in

- Scott F. McClure (D), Army veteran

=== Predictions ===
| Source | Ranking | As of |
|---|---|---|
| Sabato's Crystal Ball | Safe R | November 1, 2004 |

=== Results ===
Votes cast for Mike Crapo in proportion to turnout by county. 90–100% 80–90% 70–80% 60–70%

Support for Scott McClure Map legend: ≥4%; 2–3%; 1–2%; <1%; No votes

Crapo won every county with over 90% of the vote. His weakest performance by far was in Democratic-leaning Latah County, where he got 95.6% of the vote to McClure's 4.4%.

United States Senate election in Idaho, 2004
| Party | Candidate | Votes | % | ±% |
|---|---|---|---|---|
| Republican | Mike Crapo (incumbent) | 499,796 | 99.18% | +29.64% |
| Democratic | Scott McClure (write-in) | 4,136 | 0.82% | N/A |
| Total votes | | 503,932 | 100.0% | +24.96% |
| Turnout | | 612,786 | 76.79% | |
| Invalid or blank votes | | 108,854 | 17.76% | |
| Registered electors | | 798,015 | | |
| Republican hold | | | | |

76.79%

== See also ==
- 2004 United States Senate elections
