= J. D. Williams (Idaho politician) =

American politician

J.D. Williams (born June 3, 1942) was a state politician in Idaho who served as Idaho State Controller from 1989 to 2002. He was the only Democrat to win a statewide election in 1994.

== See also ==
- Politics of Idaho
