= 2010 United States Senate election in Idaho =

- November 2, 2010
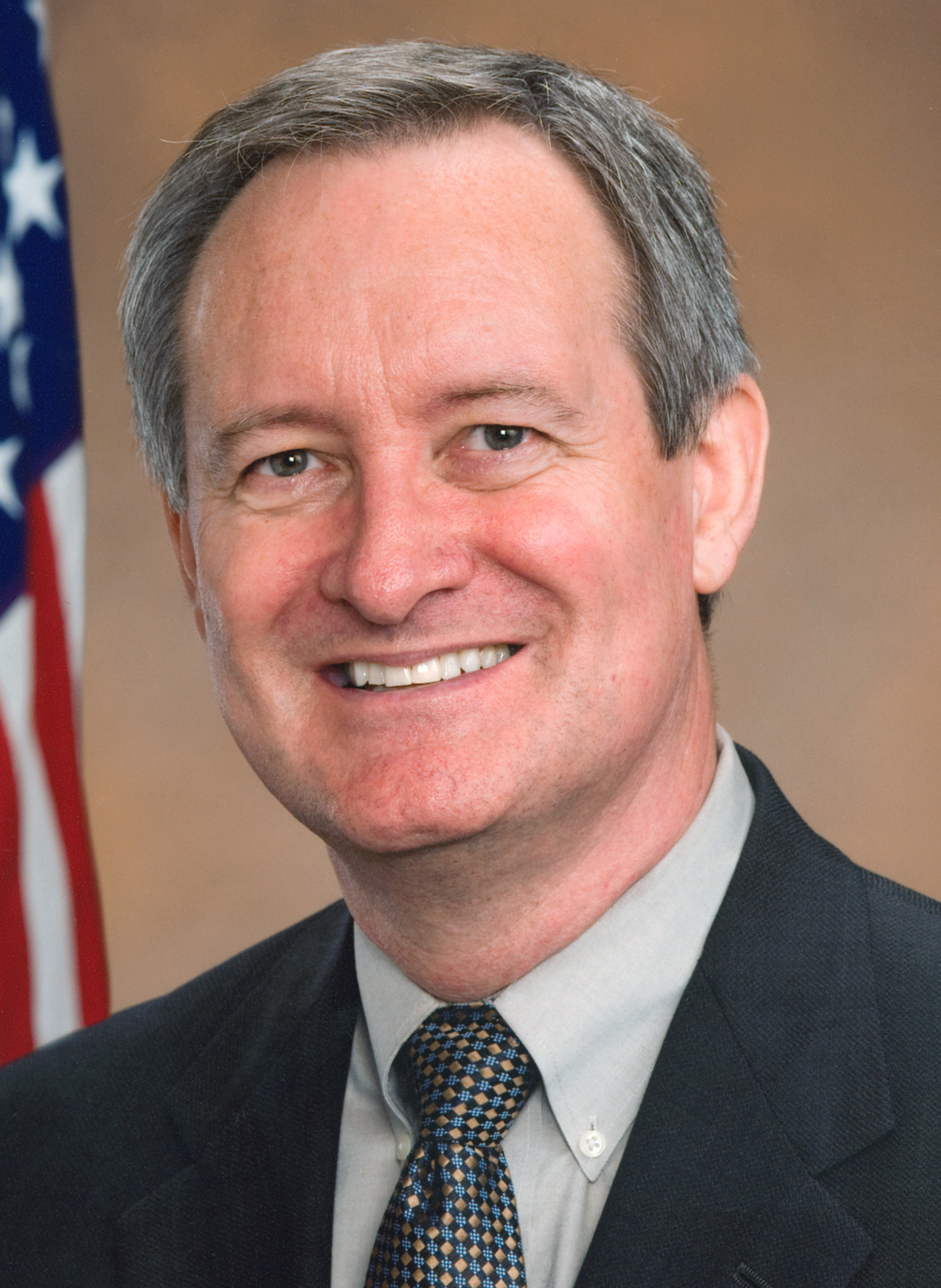

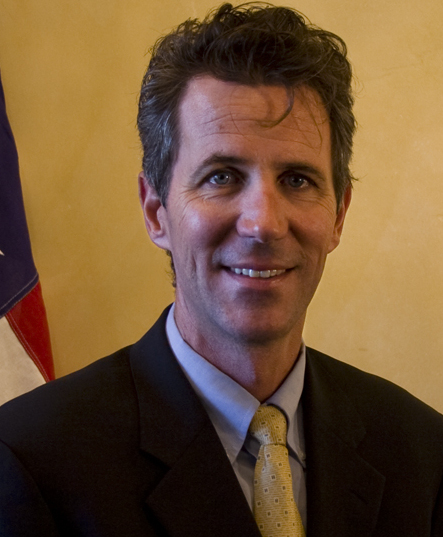
Nominee	Mike Crapo	Tom Sullivan
Party	Republican	Democratic
Popular vote	319,953	112,057
Percentage	71.17%	24.93%
- County results Crapo: 40–50% 50–60% 60–70% 70–80% 80–90%
U.S. senator before election
Mike Crapo
Republican
Elected U.S. Senator
Mike Crapo
Republican

Republican primary results by county Crapo: 70–80%; 80–90%

Democratic primary results by county Sullivan: 50–60%; 60–70%; 70–80%; 80–90%

The 2010 United States Senate election in Idaho took place on November 2, 2010, alongside 33 other elections to the United States Senate in other states as well as elections to the United States House of Representatives and various state and local elections. Incumbent Republican U.S. Senator Mike Crapo won re-election to a third term.

== Republican primary ==
=== Candidates ===
- Mike Crapo, incumbent U.S. senator
- Skip Davis

=== Results ===
Republican Primary results
Party	Candidate	Votes	%
Republican	Mike Crapo (incumbent)	127,332	79.3%
Republican	Skip Davis	33,150	20.7%
Total votes		160,482	100.0%

== Democratic primary ==
=== Candidates ===
- William Bryk
- Tom Sullivan, merchant banker

=== Results ===
Democratic Primary results
Party	Candidate	Votes	%
Democratic	Tom Sullivan	18,340	74.7%
Democratic	William Bryk	6,227	25.3%
Total votes		24,567	100.0%

== General election ==
=== Candidates ===
- Randy Lynn Bergquist (Constitution) (PVS)
- Mike Crapo (R)
- Tom Sullivan (D) (campaign site, PVS, FEC, OTI)

=== Campaign ===
Sullivan, a heavy underdog, criticized Crapo for being in Washington for too long, saying, "Senator Crapo has been in Congress for 18 years. The country is struggling, and I think it's time to make a change." Crapo emphasized his conservative record in Washington.

=== Debates ===
- October 1 on Idaho Public Television
- October 20 on KTVB

=== Predictions ===
Source	Ranking	As of
Cook Political Report	Solid R	October 26, 2010
Rothenberg	Safe R	October 22, 2010
RealClearPolitics	Safe R	October 26, 2010
Sabato's Crystal Ball	Safe R	October 21, 2010
CQ Politics	Safe R	October 26, 2010

=== Polling ===
Poll source	Date(s) administered	Sample size	Margin of Error	Mike Crapo (R)	Tom Sullivan (D)	Other	Undecided
Rasmussen Reports (report)	May 11, 2010	500	± 4.5%	66%	22%	2%	9%
Rasmussen Reports (report)	July 15, 2010	500	± 4.5%	64%	27%	3%	6%
Rasmussen Reports (report)	August 31, 2010	500	± 4.5%	63%	24%	6%	7%
Mason-Dixon (report)	October 20–22, 2010	625	± 4.0%	64%	20%	5%	11%

=== Fundraising ===
Candidate (Party)	Receipts	Disbursements	Cash On Hand	Debt
Mike Crapo (R)	$3,349,827	$2,105,646	$3,153,345	$0
Tom Sullivan (D)	$79,626	$80,707	$926	$38,393
Randy Lynn Bergquist (C)	$0	$0	$0	$0
Source: Federal Election Commission

=== Results ===
United States Senate election in Idaho, 2010
Party	Candidate	Votes	%	±%
Republican	Mike Crapo (incumbent)	319,953	71.17%	−28.01%
Democratic	Tom Sullivan	112,057	24.93%	+24.11%
Constitution	Randy Bergquist	17,429	3.88%	+3.88%
Write-in		91	0.02%	+0.02%
Majority		207,896	46.24%	−52.12%
Total votes		449,530	100.00%	-10.8%
Republican hold				

== See also ==
- United States Senate elections, 2010
