= Mike Crapo =

American lawyer and politician (born 1951)

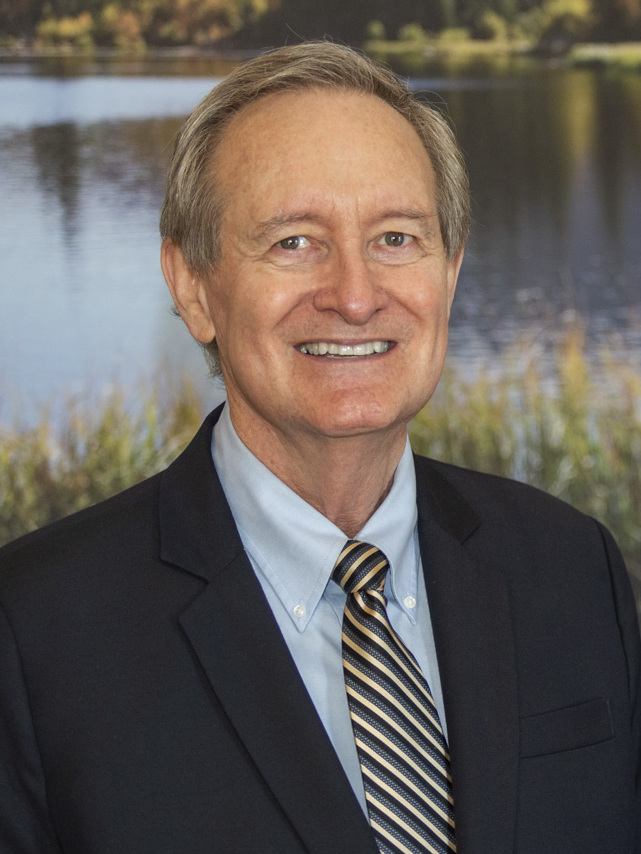
- Crapo in 2019

United States Senator from Idaho
- Incumbent
- Assumed office January 3, 1999 Serving with Jim Risch
- Preceded by: Dirk Kempthorne
Committee positions
Chair of the Senate Finance Committee
Incumbent
Assumed office January 3, 2025
Preceded by	Ron Wyden
Senate Republican Chief Deputy Whip
Incumbent
Assumed office January 3, 2013
Leader	Mitch McConnell; John Thune
Preceded by	Richard Burr
Ranking Member of the Senate Finance Committee
In office February 3, 2021 – January 3, 2025
Preceded by	Ron Wyden
Succeeded by	Ron Wyden
Chair of the Senate Banking Committee
In office January 3, 2017 – February 3, 2021
Preceded by	Richard Shelby
Succeeded by	Sherrod Brown

Member of the U.S. House of Representatives from Idaho's 2nd district
- In office January 3, 1993 – January 3, 1999
- Preceded by: Richard H. Stallings
- Succeeded by: Mike Simpson

37th President pro tempore of the Idaho Senate
- In office 1988–1992
- Preceded by: Jim Risch
- Succeeded by: Jerry Twiggs

Member of the Idaho Senate from the 32nd district
- In office December 1, 1984 – December 1, 1992
- Succeeded by: Mel Richardson

Personal details
- Born: Michael Dean Crapo; May 20, 1951 (age 75) Idaho Falls, Idaho, U.S.
- Party: Republican
- Spouse: Susan Hasleton (m. 1974)
- Children: 5
- Education: Brigham Young University (BA); Harvard University (JD)
- Website: Senate website Campaign website
- Crapo's voice Crapo delivers his State of the Union response Recorded March 1, 2022

Michael Dean Crapo (/ˈkreɪpoʊ/ KRAY-poh; born May 20, 1951) is an American lawyer and politician serving as the senior United States senator from Idaho, a seat he has held since 1999. A member of the Republican Party, Crapo served from 1993 to 1999 as the U.S. representative for Idaho's 2nd congressional district.

Born in Idaho Falls, Crapo is a graduate of Brigham Young University and Harvard Law School, practicing law in his home city throughout the 1980s. His brother Terry Crapo was majority leader in the Idaho House of Representatives from 1968 to 1972. Crapo was elected to the Idaho Senate in 1984, and served as Senate president pro tempore from 1988 to 1992. He was elected to the U.S. House in 1992, and served three terms before being elected to the Senate in 1998. He was reelected in 2004, 2010, 2016, and 2022.

Crapo is the dean of Idaho's congressional delegation.

== Early life and education ==
Crapo was born on May 20, 1951, in Idaho Falls, Idaho, to Melba (née Olsen) and George Crapo. He became an Eagle Scout in 1966. Crapo earned a Bachelor of Arts, summa cum laude, in political science from Brigham Young University in 1973 and a Juris Doctor, cum laude, from Harvard Law School in 1977.

== Early political career ==
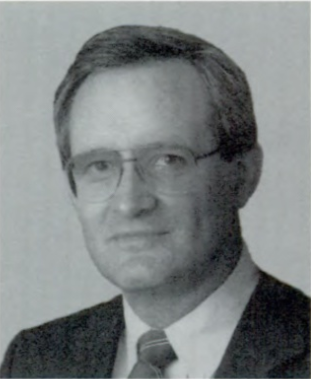
Crapo in 1993

After graduating from law school, Crapo served for one year as a law clerk to Judge James M. Carter of the U.S. Court of Appeals for the Ninth Circuit. He then returned to Idaho to practice as a lawyer, joining his brother Terry Crapo's law firm of Holden Kidwell Hahn & Crapo in Idaho Falls. In the 1980s, he became active in the Republican Party's campaigns for seats in the state legislature. His brother served in Idaho House of Representatives for four years as majority leader (1968 to 1972) and was considered a rising star in Idaho politics. After Terry's death from leukemia in 1982, Mike ran for an open seat in the Idaho Senate. He was elected to the State Senate in 1984, where he served until 1992. In 1988, Senate President pro tempore Jim Risch unexpectedly lost reelection to the Idaho Senate, and Crapo was elected by his colleagues to the president's position. He served as senate president pro tempore from 1988 to 1992.

On January 27, 1989, Crapo served as acting governor of Idaho for 12 hours while Governor Cecil D. Andrus was out of the state testifying before Congress and Lieutenant Governor Butch Otter was out of the state on business for his employer, Simplot. Andrus, a Democrat, left Crapo a note saying, "Don't do anything I wouldn't do. ... P.S. The chair is comfortable, isn't it?"

Crapo was elected to Congress in 1992, representing Idaho's 2nd congressional district in the United States House of Representatives. He served three terms from 1993 to 1999. He was elected to the U.S. Senate in 1998.

== U.S. Senate ==
=== Elections ===
Crapo was elected to the U.S. Senate in 1998. He succeeded fellow Republican Dirk Kempthorne, who retired after one term to run for governor. In his Senate bid, as in his House campaigns, Crapo's campaign made signs that had a macron placed over the "a" in his name (Crāpo) to indicate its correct pronunciation ("Cray-poe").

Crapo was reelected in 2004 with 99.2% of the vote, with the other .8% going to a write-in candidate, Democrat Scott McClure.

In 2010, Crapo was reelected to a third term with 71% of the vote, defeating Democratic nominee P. Tom Sullivan and Constitution Party nominee Randy Bergquist.

In 2016, Crapo was reelected to a fourth term with 66% of the vote, defeating Democratic nominee Jerry Sturgill and Constitution Party nominee Ray Writz. In October 2016, after the Donald Trump and Billy Bush recording came to light, Crapo said he would not vote for Trump. He later reversed that decision.

In 2022, Crapo was reelected to a fourth term with 61% of the vote, defeating Democratic, Independent, Constitution, and Libertarian nominees.

=== Tenure ===
==== 1990s ====
On February 12, 1999, Crapo was one of 50 senators to vote to convict of impeachable offenses and to remove Bill Clinton from office.

==== 2000s ====
In the 111th Congress, Crapo served on the following Senate committees: Banking, Housing and Urban Development; Budget; Environment and Public Works; Indian Affairs; and Finance. He co-chairs the Senate Nuclear Caucus, the Canada-U.S. Inter-parliamentary Group (IPG); the COPD (Chronic Obstructive Pulmonary Disease) Caucus, which he founded; and the Congressional Sportsmen's Caucus.

Crapo became the state's senior senator when the 111th United States Congress convened on January 3, 2009, succeeding Larry Craig, who decided not to seek reelection. At the convening of the 112th United States Congress, Crapo ranked 39th in seniority in the Senate.

He opposed President Barack Obama's health reform legislation, voted against the Patient Protection and Affordable Care Act in December 2009, and voted against the Health Care and Education Reconciliation Act of 2010.

==== 2010s ====
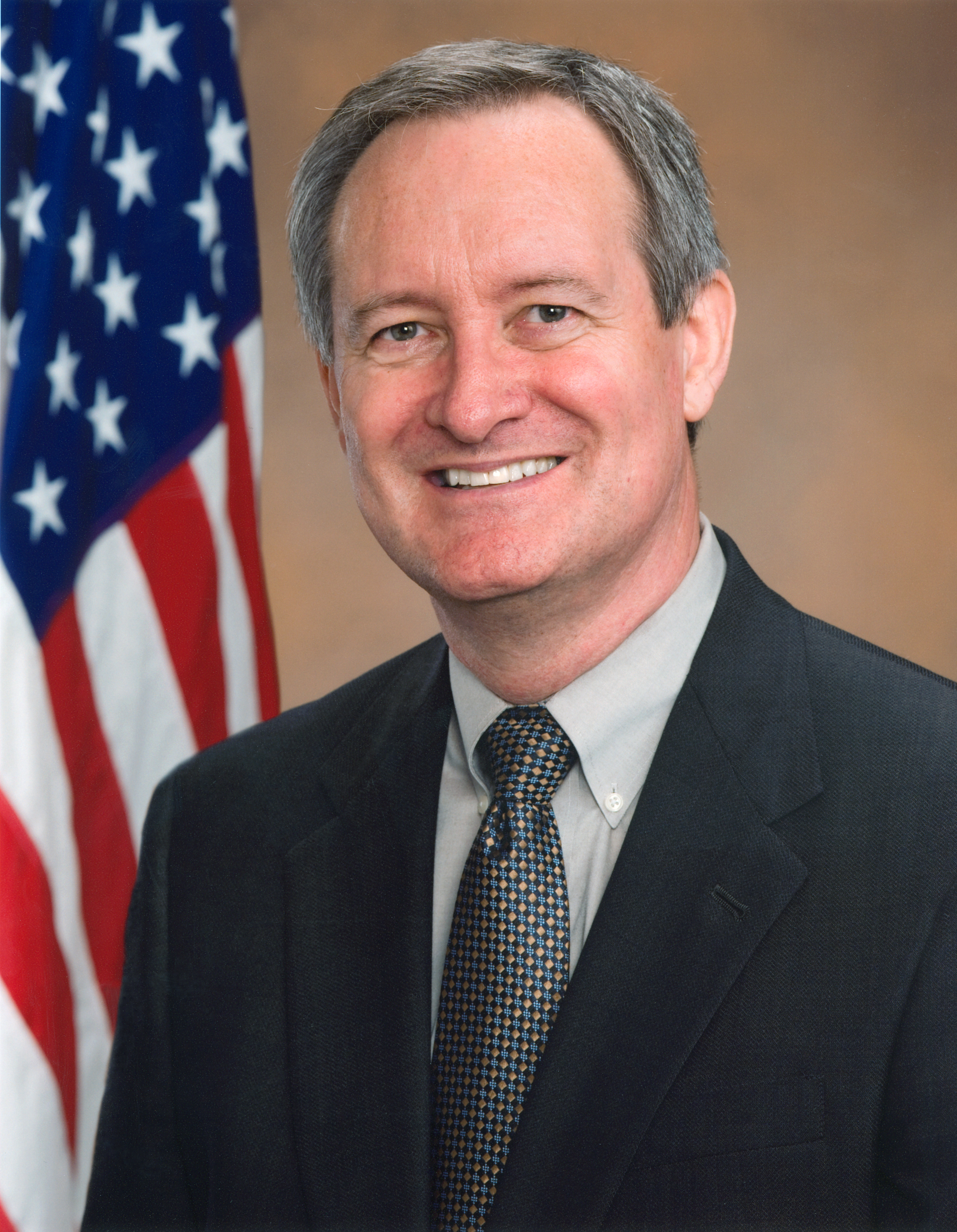
Crapo during the 111th Congress

In April 2013, Crapo was one of 46 senators to vote against a bill that would have expanded background checks for all gun buyers. He voted with 40 Republicans and 5 Democrats to stop passage of the bill.

The New York Times noted that Crapo became "something of a hero among advocates of bipartisanship" for his involvement in the "Gang of Six".

In 2017, Crapo was one of 22 senators to sign a letter to President Donald Trump urging him to withdraw the United States from the Paris Agreement.

Crapo's view on senatorial responsibilities for Supreme Court nominees has evolved. Of President George W. Bush's 2006 nomination of Samuel Alito, Crapo said in a press release, "All of the President's nominees deserve up-and-down votes and not efforts to obstruct judicial nominees for political purposes. Judges are not politicians, and hopefully, Judge Alito's nomination will put an end to the politics which have crept into the nomination process." By contrast, in 2016, his press release regarding President Obama's nomination of Merrick Garland to replace the late Antonin Scalia said:

The Constitution gives the President the right to make nominations to the Supreme Court, with the advice and consent of the Senate. As part of its role in this process, the Senate may, at its discretion, withhold consent. The next Supreme Court justice will make decisions that affect every American and shape our nation's legal landscape for decades. Therefore, the current Supreme Court vacancy should be filled by an individual nominated by the next President of the United States.

==== 2020s ====
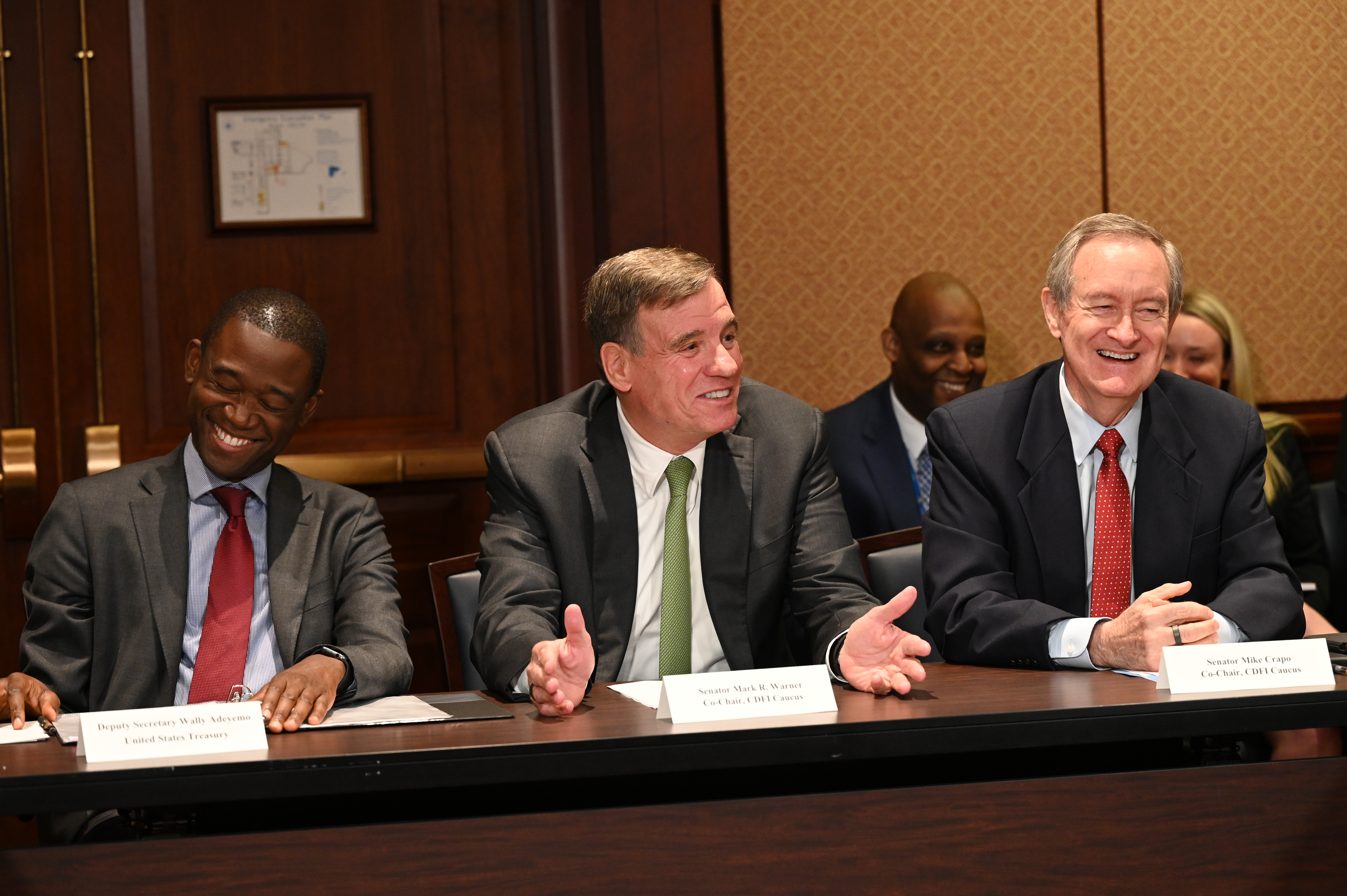
Mike Crapo with Senator Mark Warner and Deputy Secretary of the Treasury Wally Adeyemo

In September 2020, with less than two months to the next presidential election, Crapo voiced support for an immediate Senate vote on Trump's nominee to fill the Supreme Court vacancy caused by the death of justice Ruth Bader Ginsburg, once a "well-qualified candidate" was put forth.

For his tenure as the chairman of the Senate Banking, Housing, and Urban Affairs Committee during the 116th Congress, Crapo was given an "F" grade from the non-partisan Lugar Center's Congressional Oversight Hearing Index.

On January 6, 2021, Crapo was participating in the certification of the 2021 United States Electoral College vote count when Trump supporters attacked the United States Capitol. In response, he called for "perpetrators" to be "prosecuted to the fullest extent of the law". He opposed removing Trump from office, saying that the "country is too divided" and that invoking the Twenty-fifth Amendment to the United States Constitution "would only make matters worse".

Crapo has served as the chair of the Senate Republicans's Committee on Committees since 2003, which coordinates the committee assignments for the caucus as a whole.

In October 2023, Crapo visited China as part of a bipartisan congressional delegation led by Senate Majority Leader Chuck Schumer and met with General Secretary of the Chinese Communist Party Xi Jinping. Crapo said he would raise concerns about market-access on behalf of Micron Technology, which faced restrictions in China. The delegation also met Director of the Office of the Central Foreign Affairs Commission Wang Yi, Chairman of the Standing Committee of the National People's Congress Zhao Leji, and Shanghai Communist Party Secretary Chen Jining.

In September 2025, Crapo chaired a heated three-hour Senate hearing with Robert F. Kennedy Jr. Crapo denied Ron Wyden's request to have Kennedy formally sworn in as a witness.

=== 119th United States Congress Committee assignments ===
- Committee on Banking, Housing, and Urban Affairs
  - Subcommittee on Financial Institutions and Consumer Protection
  - Subcommittee on Housing, Transportation, and Community Development
  - Subcommittee on Securities, Insurance, and Investment
- Committee on the Budget
- Committee on Finance (Chairman)
- Joint Committee on Taxation

=== Caucus memberships ===
- International Conservation Caucus
- Senate Diabetes Caucus
- Senate Nuclear Cleanup Caucus (co-chair)
- Senate Renewables and Energy Efficiency Caucus (co-chair)
- Sportsmen's Caucus (co-chair)
- Western Water Caucus
- Zero Capital Gains Tax Caucus
- Senate Republican Conference

== Political positions ==
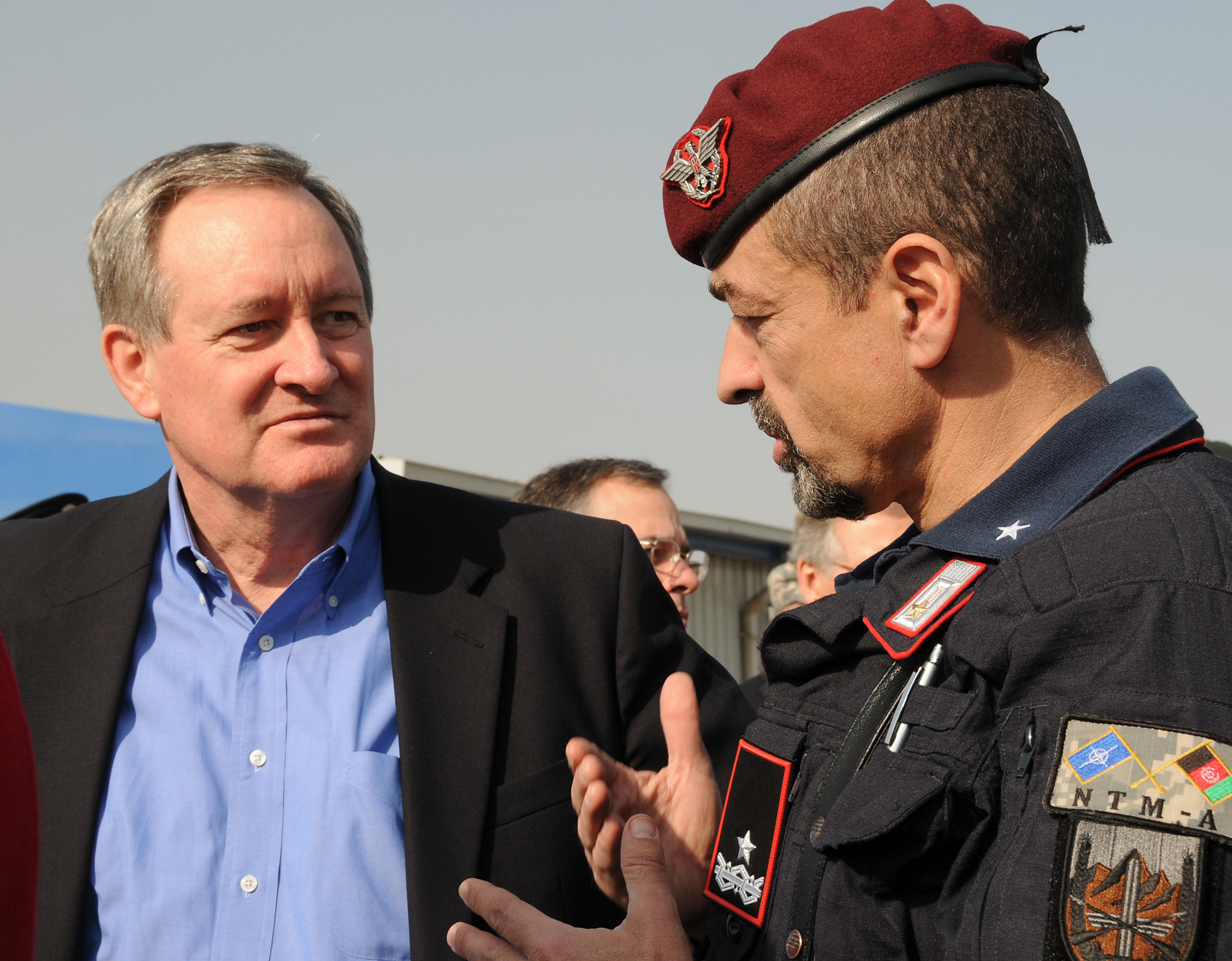
Crapo with Brigadier General Carmelo Burgio of Carabinieri in Afghanistan, 2010

Crapo is considered politically conservative. The American Conservative Union's Center for Legislative Accountability gives him a lifetime conservative rating of 91.30. Americans for Democratic Action gave him a liberalism score of 5 out of a possible 100 in 2020.

=== Abortion ===
Crapo is anti-abortion. In 1998, he supported a bill that made it illegal for minors to cross state lines to get abortions in order to avoid parental consent laws. In 2009, he voted to restrict UN funding for population control policies. Crapo praised the overturning of Roe v. Wade in June 2022.

=== Energy ===
Crapo is a proponent of nuclear energy. He supports the nuclear energy projects at the Idaho National Laboratory (INL) and helped work on the nuclear-related Senate bills known as the Nuclear Energy Innovation Capabilities Act (NEICA) and the Nuclear Energy Innovation and Modernization Act (NEIMA). The former bill helped establish the National Reactor Innovation Center at the INL.

=== Gun law ===
In 2012, Crapo said that more gun control regulations would not curb violence in the United States. He also said that he supported efforts to improve mental health access rather than more gun laws.

Crapo has received multiple "A+" grades from the National Rifle Association Political Victory Fund (NRA-PVF) for his voting record on causes supported by the NRA. The same year, he joined 12 other senators vowing to filibuster any attempts by Democrats to introduce additional gun control regulations in the wake of the Sandy Hook Elementary School shooting. Crapo also supported legislation to make open carry legal in National Parks.

In January 2017, the NRA praised Crapo for introducing the Hearing Protection Act, which would make access to gun silencers easier.

In response to the 2017 Las Vegas shooting, Crapo called for "solidarity" and praised first responders. The Hearing Protection Act bill was tabled in wake of the shooting.

=== Fiscal policy ===
In 2024, Crapo argued that proposed Republican tax cut extensions do not need to be offset with measures to prevent the tax cuts from adding to the deficit. He supported ending IRS Direct File, which allowed citizens to file taxes for free.

=== Veterans ===
In 2022, Crapo was among the 11 senators who voted against the Honoring our PACT Act of 2022, a bill that funded research and benefits for up to 3.5 million veterans exposed to toxic substances during their service.

== Personal life ==
Crapo married Susan Diane Hasleton in June 1974, and they have five children. He is a member of the Church of Jesus Christ of Latter-day Saints.

Crapo was diagnosed with prostate cancer in 1999 and underwent a radical prostatectomy in January 2000. He had a full recovery and was declared cancer-free. In 2005 he had a recurrence of prostate cancer, and underwent a series of radiation treatments. He has become active in advocating early detection tests for cancer and other treatable diseases. Crapo has also pushed to create a federal Office of Men's Health.

Crapo is an Eagle Scout, awarded in 1966. He received the Distinguished Eagle Scout Award (DESA) in 2000.

On January 4, 2013, Crapo pleaded guilty to DUI in connection with a December 2012 incident and received the standard punishment for a first-time offender in Virginia. He issued a public apology just after his arrest, and various Idaho media outlets criticized him in light of his religion's temperance tenets.

== Electoral history ==
1998 U.S. Senate Republican primary results
Party	Candidate	Votes	%
Republican	Mike Crapo	110,205	87.27%
Republican	Matt Lambert	16,075	12.73%
Total votes		126,280	100.00%

1998 United States Senate election in Idaho
Party	Candidate	Votes	%	±%
Republican	Mike Crapo	262,966	69.54%	+13.01%
Democratic	Bill Mauk	107,375	28.39%	−15.08%
Natural Law	George J. Mansfeld	7,833	2.07%	N/A
Majority		155,591	41.14%	+28.10%
Turnout		378,174		
Republican hold		Swing		

2004 U.S. Senate Republican primary results
Party	Candidate	Votes	%
Republican	Mike Crapo (incumbent)	118,286	100.00%
Total votes		118,286	100.00%

2004 United States Senate election in Idaho
Party	Candidate	Votes	%	±%
Republican	Mike Crapo (incumbent)	499,796	99.18%	+29.64%
Democratic	Scott F. McClure (write-in)	4,136	0.82%	
Majority		495,660	98.36%	+57.22%
Total votes		503,932	100.0%	+125,578
Republican hold				

2010 U.S. Senate Republican primary results
Party	Candidate	Votes	%
Republican	Mike Crapo (incumbent)	127,332	79.3%
Republican	Claude "Skip" Davis	33,150	20.7%
Total votes		160,482	100.0%

2010 United States Senate election in Idaho
Party	Candidate	Votes	%	±%
Republican	Michael Crapo (incumbent)	319,953	71.19%	−27.99%
Democratic	Tom Sullivan	112,057	24.93%	N/A
Constitution	Randy Bergquist	17,429	3.88%	N/A
Majority		207,896	46.26%	
Total votes		449,439	100.00%	
Republican hold		Swing		

2016 U.S. Senate Republican primary results
Party	Candidate	Votes	%
Republican	Mike Crapo (incumbent)	119,633	100.00%
Total votes		119,633	100.00%

2016 United States Senate election in Idaho
Party	Candidate	Votes	%	±%
Republican	Mike Crapo (incumbent)	449,017	66.13%	−5.06%
Democratic	Jerry Sturgill	188,249	27.73%	+2.80%
Constitution	Ray J. Writz	41,677	6.14%	+2.26%
Total votes		678,943	100.0%	N/A
Republican hold				

2022 U.S. Senate Republican primary results
Party	Candidate	Votes	%
Republican	Mike Crapo (incumbent)	177,906	67.1%
Republican	Scott Trotter	27,699	10.5%
Republican	Brenda Bourn	21,612	8.2%
Republican	Ramont Turnbull	20,883	7.9%
Republican	Natalie Fleming	16,902	6.4%
Total votes		265,002	100.00%

2022 United States Senate election in Idaho
Party	Candidate	Votes	%
Republican	Mike Crapo (incumbent)	358,539	60.6%
Democratic	David Roth	169,808	28.7%
Independent	Scott Cleveland	49,917	8.4%
Constitution	Ray Writz	8,500	1.4%
Libertarian	Idaho Sierra Law	4,126	0.7%
Total votes		590,890	100.00%
Republican hold			

U.S. House of Representatives
Preceded by Richard Stallings	Member of the U.S. House of Representatives from Idaho's 2nd congressional district 1993–1999	Succeeded by Mike Simpson
Party political offices
Preceded by Dirk Kempthorne	Republican nominee for U.S. Senator from Idaho (Class 3); 1998, 2004, 2010, 2016, 2022	Most recent
Preceded by Richard Burr	Senate Republican Chief Deputy Whip; 2013–present	Incumbent
U.S. Senate
Preceded by Dirk Kempthorne	U.S. Senator (Class 3) from Idaho; 1999–present Served alongside: Larry Craig, Jim Risch	Incumbent
Preceded by Richard Shelby	Ranking Member of the Senate Banking Committee; 2013–2015	Succeeded by Sherrod Brown
Preceded by Richard Shelby	Chair of the Senate Banking Committee; 2017–2021	Succeeded by Sherrod Brown
Preceded by Ron Wyden	Ranking Member of the Senate Finance Committee; 2021–2025	Succeeded by Ron Wyden
Preceded by Ron Wyden	Chair of the Senate Finance Committee; 2025–present	Incumbent
Preceded by Jason Smith	Chair of the Joint Taxation Committee; 2026–present	Incumbent
U.S. order of precedence (ceremonial)
Preceded by Susan Collins	Order of precedence of the United States as United States Senator	Succeeded by Maria Cantwell
Preceded by Chuck Schumer	United States senators by seniority 9th	Succeeded by Maria Cantwell
