= 1998 United States Senate election in Idaho =

- November 3, 1998
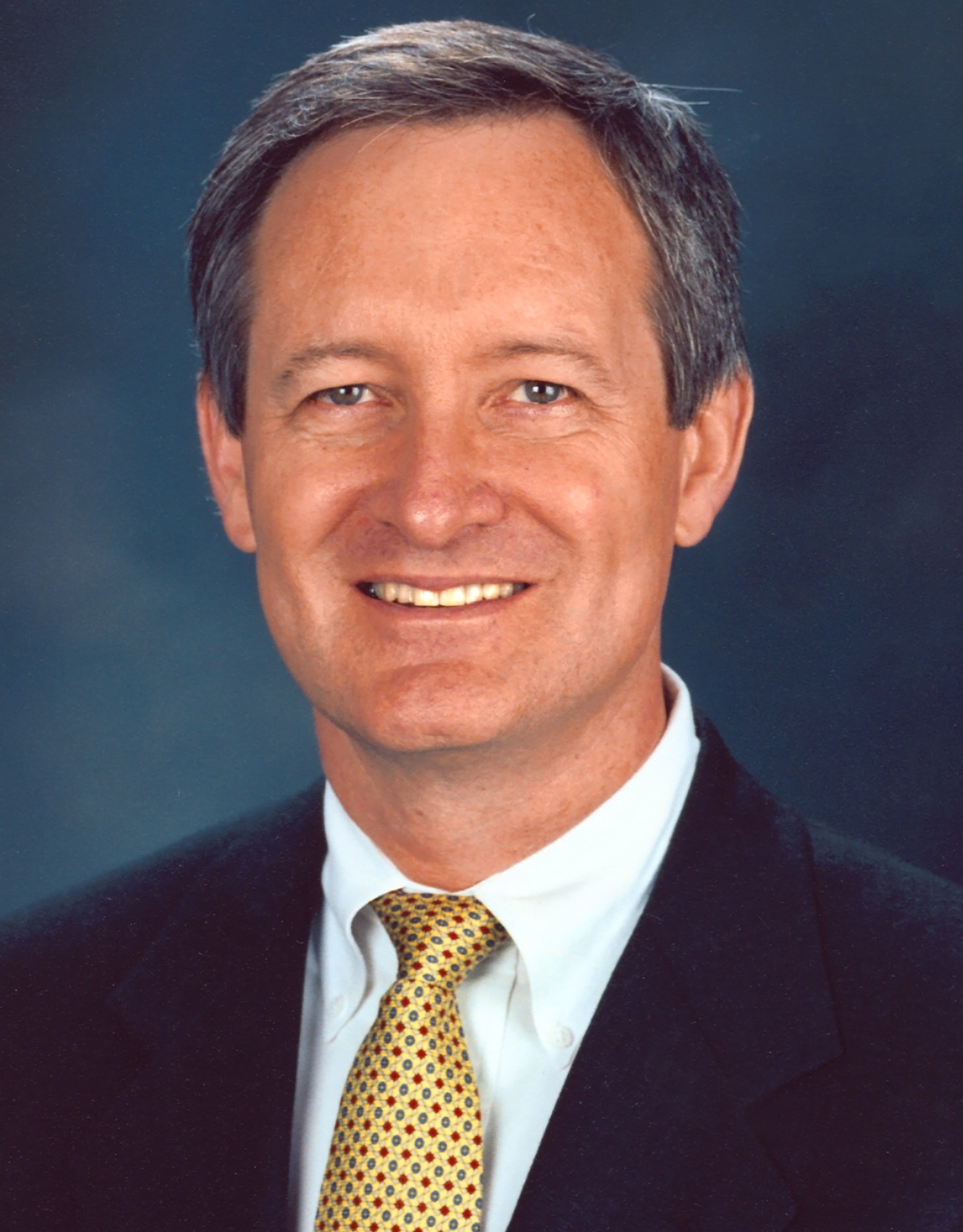

| Nominee | Mike Crapo | Bill Mauk |
| Party | Republican | Democratic |
| Popular vote | 262,966 | 107,375 |
| Percentage | 69.54% | 28.39% |
- County results Crapo: 40–50% 50–60% 60–70% 70–80% 80–90% >90%
U.S. senator before election
Dirk Kempthorne
Republican
Elected U.S. Senator
Mike Crapo
Republican

The 1998 United States Senate election in Idaho was held November 3, 1998 alongside other elections to the United States Senate in other states as well as elections to the United States House of Representatives and various state and local elections. Incumbent Republican U.S. Senator Dirk Kempthorne decided to retire after one term to run for governor. Republican nominee Mike Crapo won the open seat.

== Democratic primary ==
=== Candidates ===
- Bill Mauk, Chairman of the Idaho Democratic Party

=== Results ===
Democratic primary results
| Party | Candidate | Votes | % |
|---|---|---|---|
| Democratic | Bill Mauk | 22,503 | 100.00% |
| Total votes | | 22,503 | 100.00% |

== Republican primary ==
=== Candidates ===
- Mike Crapo, U.S. Representative
- Matt Lambert

=== Results ===
Republican primary results
| Party | Candidate | Votes | % |
|---|---|---|---|
| Republican | Mike Crapo | 110,205 | 87.27% |
| Republican | Matt Lambert | 16,075 | 12.73% |
| Total votes | | 126,280 | 100.00% |

== General election ==
=== Candidates ===
- Mike Crapo (R), U.S. Representative
- George Mansfeld (NL)
- Bill Mauk (D), Chairman of the Idaho Democratic Party

=== Polling ===
| Poll source | Date(s) administered | Sample size (Note: Key: A – all adults RV – registered voters LV – likely voters V – unclear) | Margin of error | Mike Crapo (R) | Bill Mauk (D) | Undecided |
|---|---|---|---|---|---|---|
| Mason Dixon | September 01–03, 1998 | 1,208 (LV) | ± 2.9% | 61% | 17% | 12% |

=== Results ===
General election results
| Party | Candidate | Votes | % | ±% |
|---|---|---|---|---|
| Republican | Mike Crapo | 262,966 | 69.54% | +13.01% |
| Democratic | Bill Mauk | 107,375 | 28.39% | −15.08% |
| Natural Law | George J. Mansfeld | 7,833 | 2.07% | +2.07% |
| Majority | | 155,591 | 41.14% | +28.10% |
| Turnout | | 378,174 | | −20.97% |
| Republican hold | | | | |

== See also ==
- 1998 United States Senate elections
