= Edlefsen =

Edlefsen is a surname. Notable people with the surname include:

- J. L. Edlefsen (1874–1948), American politician
- R. E. Edlefsen (1906–1986), American politician
- Steve Edlefsen (born 1985), American baseball player
- Tom Edlefsen (born 1941), American tennis player

== See also ==
- Ellefsen
