= Shellworth =

Shellworth is a surname. Notable people with the surname include:

- Eugene W. Shellworth (1912–1997), American politician
- Sandy Shellworth (1944–2019), American alpine skier
