= Amyx =

Amyx is a surname. Notable people with the surname include:

- Darrell A. Amyx (1911–1997), American archaeologist
- Fleming Amyx, American politician
- Jay S. Amyx (1923–2014), American politician
- Mike Amyx, American politician
- Raleigh DeGeer Amyx (1938–2019), American FBI agent and Americana collector
- Cheryl Amyx (1962-), American IT Entrepreneur
