= Boise Union Pacific Depot =

Train station in Idaho, United States

Boise Depot
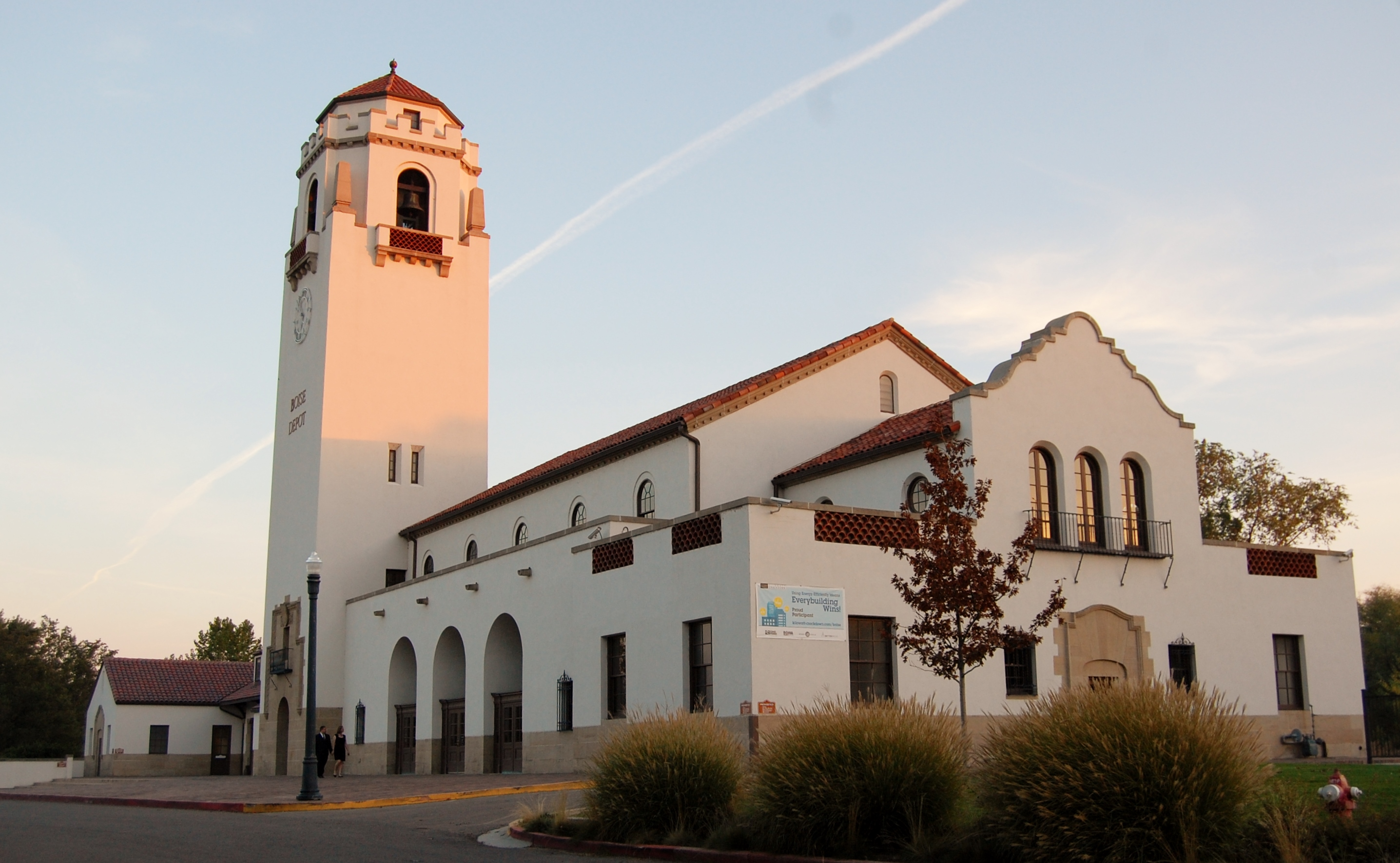
- Boise Depot in 2015

General information
- Location: 2603 West Eastover Terrace; Boise, Idaho; United States
- System: Former Amtrak & Union Pacific inter-city rail station
- Owner: City of Boise
- Line: None
- Platforms: 1 side platform
- Tracks: 1

Construction
- Structure type: At-grade
- Accessible: Yes

Other information
- Station code: BOI (Amtrak)

History
- Opened: April 16, 1925; 101 years ago
- Closed: May 10, 1997 (for passenger rail service)
- Rebuilt: 1993 (renovation)

Former services
Preceding station	Amtrak	Following station
Nampa toward Seattle	Pioneer	Shoshone 1981–1997 toward Chicago
Nampa toward Seattle	Pioneer	Mountain Home 1977–1981 toward Chicago
Preceding station	Union Pacific Railroad	Following station
Perkins toward Portland	Portland – Granger	Hillcrest toward Granger
- Union Pacific Mainline Depot
- U.S. National Register of Historic Places
- Coordinates: 43.602°N 116.2147°W
- Area: 8.7 acres (3.5 ha)
- Built: 1925; 101 years ago
- Architect: Cherdron Construction Company, Carrere, Hastings, Shreve & Lamb
- Architectural style: Spanish Colonial
- NRHP reference No.: 74000730
- Added to NRHP: August 7, 1974
Location

The Boise Depot is a former train station built by the Union Pacific Railroad and opened in 1925 in Boise, Idaho, United States. At an elevation of 2,753 feet (839 m) above sea level on the rim of the first bench, the depot overlooks Capitol Boulevard and the Idaho State Capitol, one mile (1.6 km) to the northeast. The station building is listed on the National Register of Historic Places (NRHP).

== History ==
The depot was built in 1925 by the Union Pacific Railroad, and service by its Portland Rose began with service between Chicago, Illinois, and Portland, Oregon. Thousands attended its debut with mainline service in mid-April, including Union Pacific president Carl Gray, granted a key to the city by Mayor Eugene Sherman.

The UP's City of Portland also Chicago to Portland, for several decades made stops in Boise. Union Pacific discontinued the Portland Rose and the City of Portland (along with all its passenger rail service) on May 1, 1971, the day Amtrak began operating.

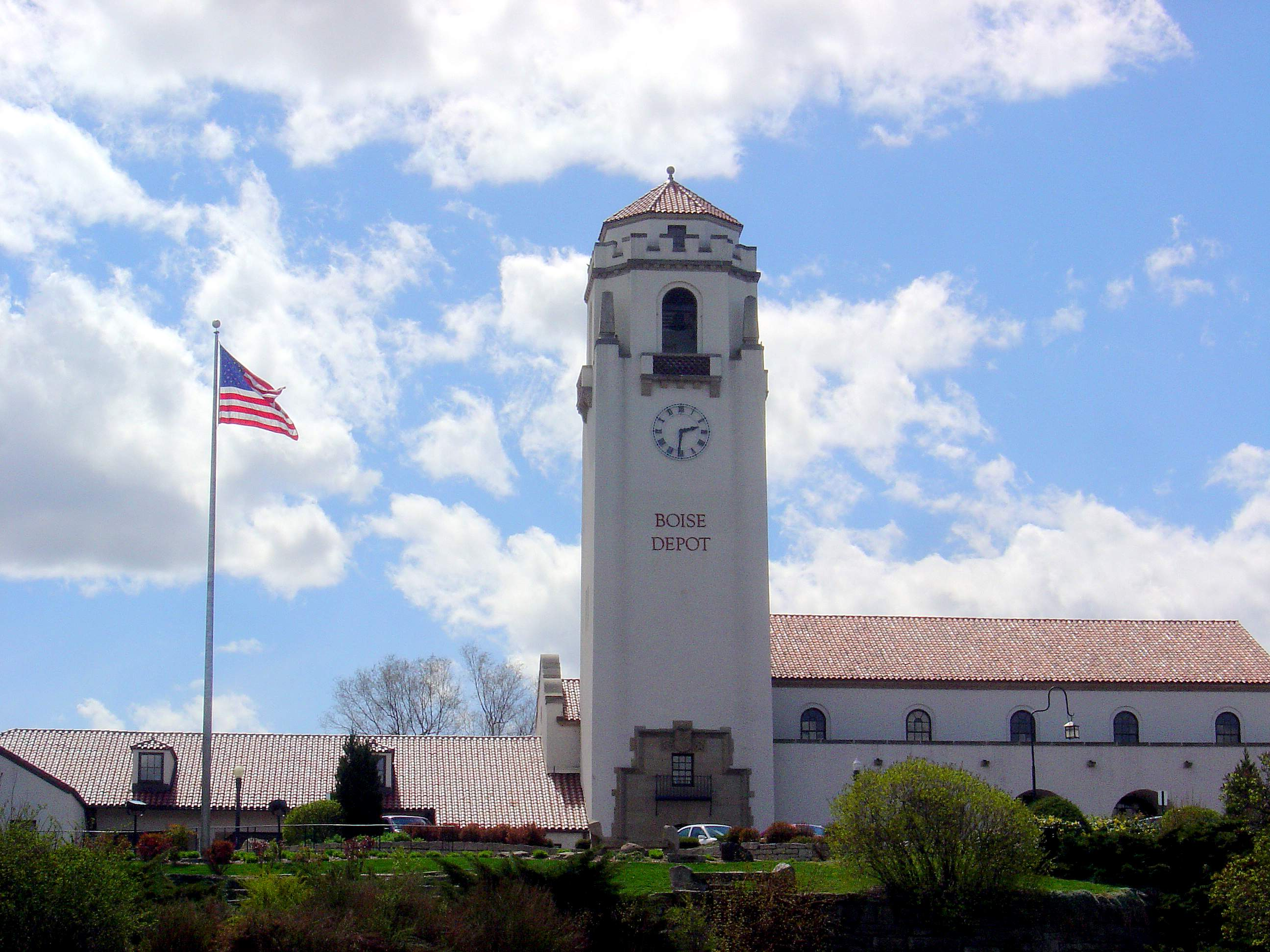
Boise Depot from northeast in 2006

Six years later, Amtrak (the National Railroad Passenger Corporation) resumed passenger service to the station in 1977 with the Pioneer, Initially run between Salt Lake City, Utah, and Seattle, Washington, it was later extended further east and provided daily service from Chicago to Seattle. The next eastbound stop on the Pioneer was originally in Mountain Home, but that station was dropped in 1981, so the next eastbound stop was Shoshone; the next westbound stop was Nampa.

Forty-nine years after its debut, the Boise Depot was listed on the NRHP on August 7, 1974, as the Union Pacific Mainline Depot. The last passenger train to use the depot was the Pioneer, which ended service 29 years ago in 1997.

In 1990, Boise-based Morrison–Knudsen Corporation (MK) purchased the depot and renovated it to pristine condition. The City of Boise took it over in 1996 and opened it for tours and special events; it is open to the public Sundays and Mondays from 11:00 am to 5:00 pm.

== See also ==
- National Register of Historic Places listings in Ada County, Idaho
