= Rattlesnake Mountains (Montana) =

Mountain range in Montana, United States

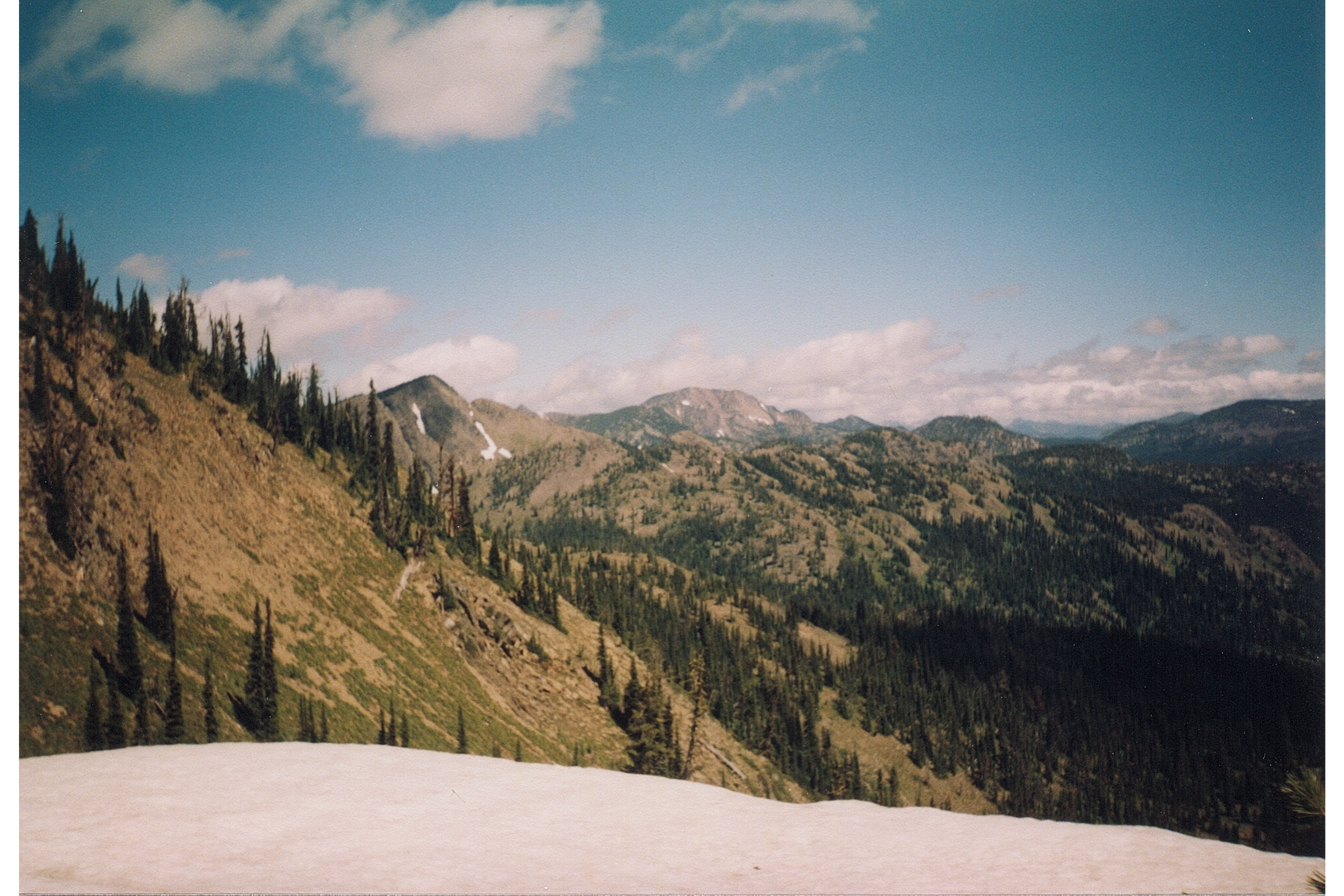
- The high country of the Rattlesnake Mountains, looking towards McLeod Peak

Highest point
- Peak: McLeod Peak
- Elevation: 8,620 ft (2,630 m)
- Coordinates: 47°5′42″N 113°55′23″W

Geography
- Country: United States
- State: Montana
- Parent range: Rocky Mountains

The Rattlesnake Mountains are a prominent mountain range located just 4 miles north of Missoula, Montana, USA. The highest point in the range is McLeod Peak, (8,620 feet (2,630 m)). Much of the range is protected in the Rattlesnake Wilderness and Rattlesnake National Recreation Area on the Lolo National Forest. An additional 36,000 acres (15,000 ha) of the range are protected on the Flathead Indian Reservation as the South Fork Tribal Primitive Area; this area is off-limits to non-tribal members. Including the Tribal Primitive Area, then, about 100,000 acres (40,000 ha) of the Rattlesnakes are roadless.

Over 30 high mountain lakes grace the range, and subalpine spruce-fir forests give way at lower elevations to groves of ponderosa pine and douglas fir. Lodgepole pine and western larch are abundant. Wildlife includes black bear, mountain lions, and some mountain goats. Grizzly bear and gray wolf are sporadic visitors. Only a single dirt road separates the Rattlesnake Mountains from the Mission Mountains to the north.

The Rattlesnake Wilderness includes some lands that were logged extensively in the past, which are slowly regaining their wilderness attributes.

The Montana Snowbowl ski area is located in the southwestern portion of the range.

The Rattlesnake is treated by many Missoula residents as their backyard playground due to its close proximity to town. A large (450 strong) elk herd summers in the Rattlesnake and winters in the foothills near the Grant Creek area of Missoula; this herd has overpopulated its range and the State of Montana offers an extended hunting season and special permits in an attempt to reduce their numbers.

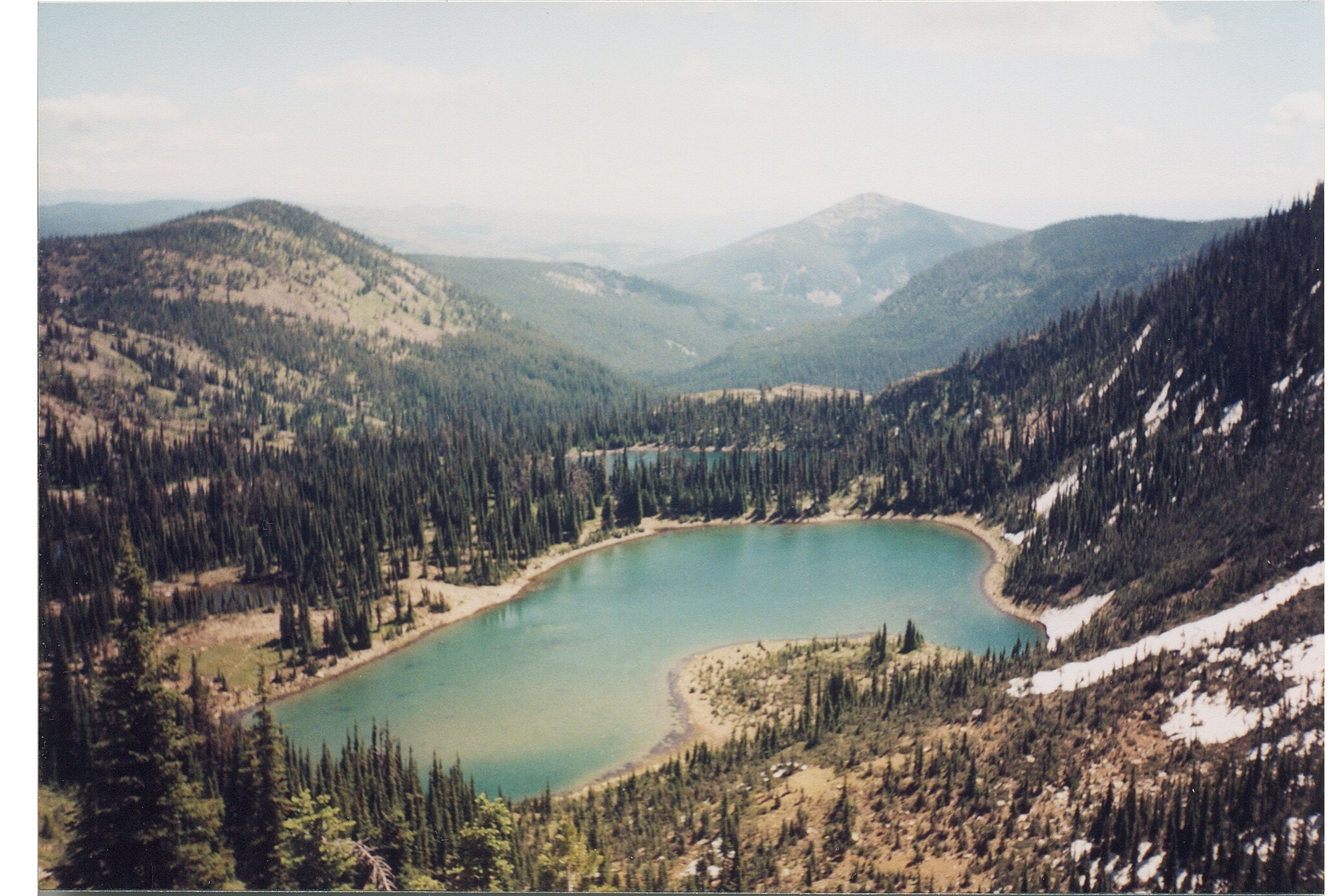
Alpine lake in the Rattlesnakes

== See also ==
- List of mountain ranges in Montana
