= The Record-Courier =

The Record-Courier may refer to one of these newspapers:

- The Record-Courier (Nevada), Gardnerville, Nevada
- The Record-Courier (Ohio), Portage County, Ohio
- The Record-Courier (Baker City), Baker City, Oregon
