= John McCue =

John McCue may refer to:

- John McCue (footballer), English footballer
- John B. McCue, member of the Pennsylvania House of Representatives
- John Arthur McCue, member of the Legislative Assembly of Ontario
- J. J. McCue, mayor of Boise, Idaho
