= Ontario station =

Ontario station may refer to:

- Ontario station (Amtrak), an Amtrak station in Ontario, California
- Ontario–East station, a Metrolink station in Ontario, California
- Ontario station (Oregon), a historic station in Ontario, Oregon
- Rail stations in Ontario, Canada
