= Cyrus Jacobs House =

- U.S. National Register of Historic Places
- Cyrus Jacobs-Uberuaga House
- Basque Museum and Cultural Center
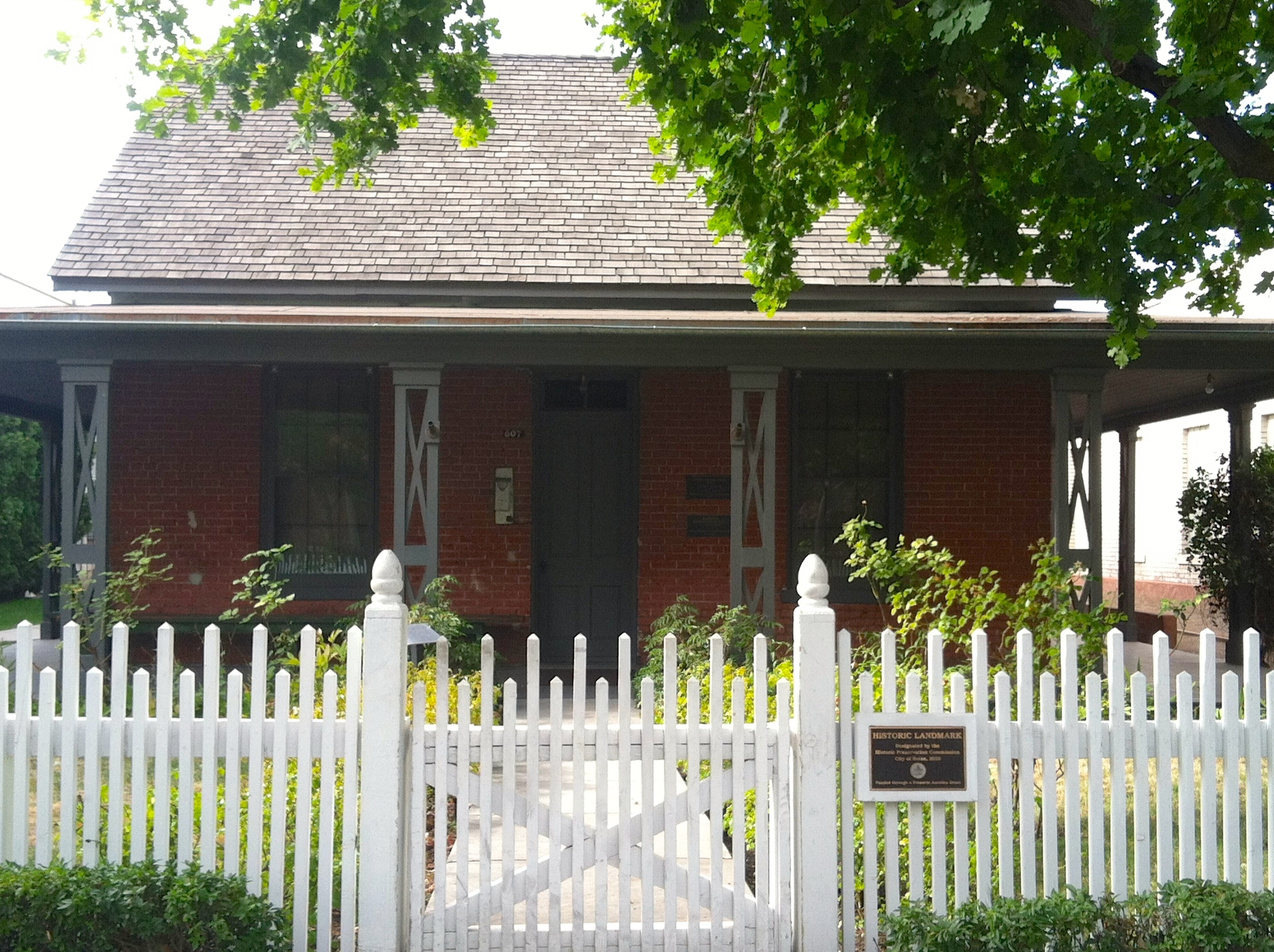
- The Cyrus Jacobs House in 2013

- Location within Idaho Location within the United States
- Location: 607 Grove St., Boise, Idaho
- Coordinates: 43°36′49″N 116°12′05″W
- Area: less than one acre
- Built: 1864
- Built by: Charles May
- NRHP reference No.: 72000434
- Added to NRHP: November 27, 1972

The Cyrus Jacobs House, also known as the Cyrus Jacobs-Uberuaga House and the Basque Museum and Cultural Center, in Boise, Idaho, is a 1 1/2-story brick house constructed by Charles May in 1864. The house was added to the National Register of Historic Places in 1972.

== History ==
Boise's oldest surviving brick building, the house was occupied by Cyrus and Mary Jacobs from its construction in 1864 until the death of Cyrus Jacobs in 1900. Mary Jacobs continued to live at the house until her death in 1907. In 1878 the house was enlarged to include a dining room and two additional bedrooms.

In 1895 Idaho's future senator William Borah and Mamie McConnell, daughter of Idaho governor William J. McConnell, were married at the house.

In 1910 the site became a lodging house for Basque sheepherders. In 1917 the Uberuaga family rented it, and the family purchased the house in 1928, operating a lodging business at the site until 1969.

Boise's Basque Museum and Cultural Center acquired the house in 1985 and converted it into a headquarters and museum. Basque politician José Antonio Ardanza planted saplings from the fourth Gernikako Arbola, a symbolic oak tree in Boise's sister city, Gernika, at the house in 1988.

In 2012 archaeologists from the University of Idaho excavated a well under the porch at the house and identified between 7000 and 10,000 artifacts dated to the time Cyrus Jacobs lived there, including toys, bottles, English toothpaste, and French shaving cream.

== Cyrus Jacobs ==
Cyrus Y. Jacobs (December 23, 1831—June 28, 1900) was a Boise pioneer who helped to plat the original townsite in 1863. He operated a grain mill and a mercantile establishment, and he sold his own brand of rye whiskey. Jacobs served as mayor of Boise (1879-1880), and he was an early proponent of Boise's streetcar.

== See also ==
Basque diaspora
