= South Eighth Street Historic District =

- U.S. National Register of Historic Places
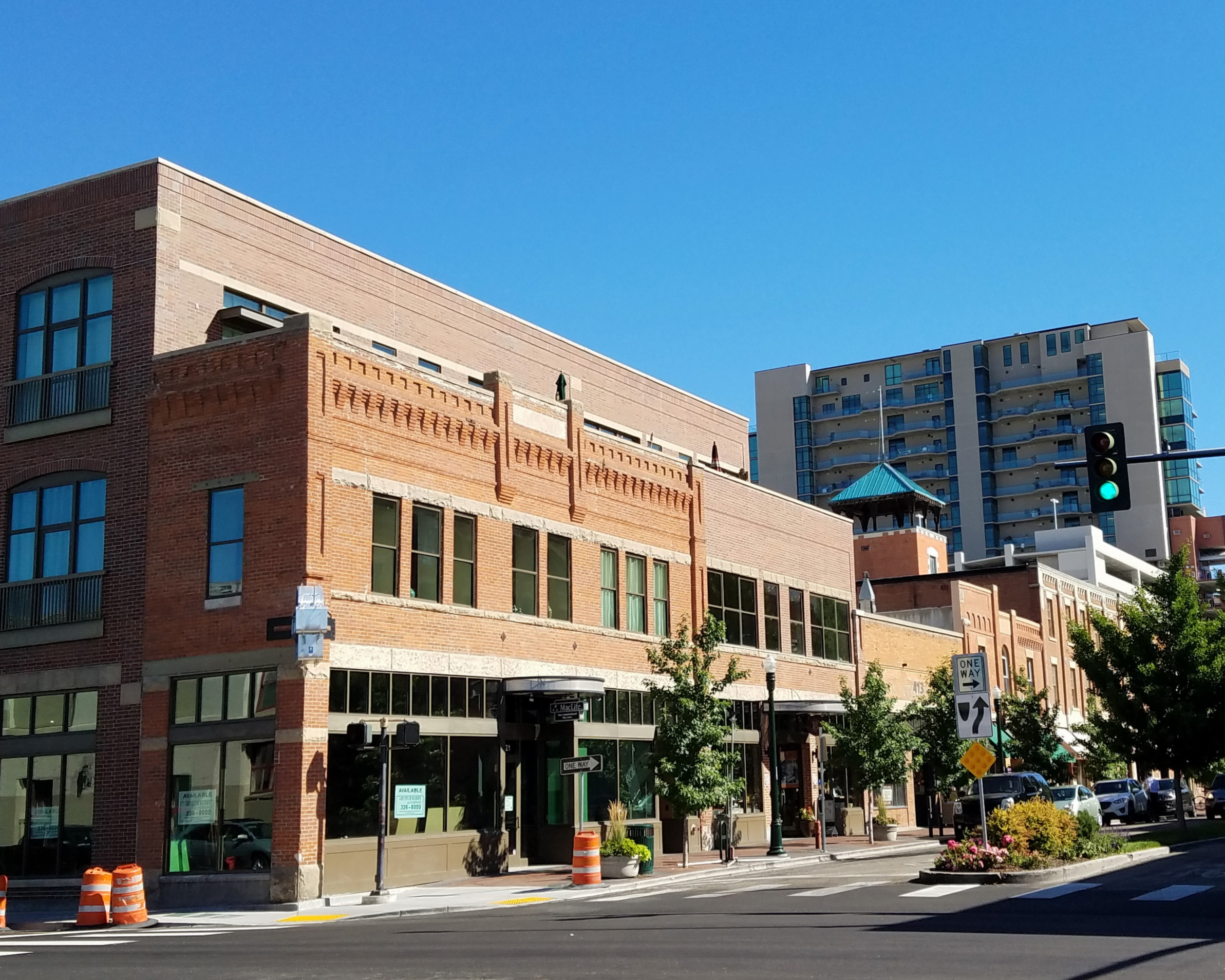
- The O.W. Smith Building (1902) in the South 8th Street Historic District

- Location within Idaho Location within the United States
- Location: Roughly bounded by 8th, 9th, Miller, and Broad Sts., Boise, Idaho
- Area: 8 acres (3.2 ha)
- Architect: Tourtellotte & Co.; Wayland & Fennell; and others
- NRHP reference No.: 77000450
- Added to NRHP: December 12, 1977

The South Eighth Street Historic District in Boise, Idaho, is an area of approximately 8 acres (3.2 ha) that includes 22 commercial buildings generally constructed between 1902 and 1915. The buildings are of brick, many with stone cornices and rounded arches, and are between one and four stories in height. The area had been Boise's warehouse district, and many of the buildings were constructed adjacent to railroad tracks that separated downtown from its industrial core. The district is bounded by Broad and Fulton Streets and 8th and 9th Streets.

Only the Idaho Candy Company remains in business at its location in the district (1909), and most of the other sites have been converted for shopping, restaurants, and offices. Boise Contemporary Theater and the Esther Simplot Performing Arts Academy also occupy buildings in the district.

== Inventory ==
- Mutual Creamery (1912), 601 S 9th St, also known as the Jensen Creamery or as the Meadow Gold building
- Northrup, King & Co. Seed Warehouse (1935), 520 S 9th St
- Harry K. Fritchman Building (1910), 506 S 9th St. Harry Fritchman served as Boise City mayor 1911–12.
- Boise Ice & Produce Co. (1910), 504 S 9th St
- Davis Warehouse (1910), 418 S 9th St, also known as the Peasley Transfer & Storage warehouse and as the Idaho Fish & Poultry Co., the building had been used originally by the Shaw Lumber Co.
- Harry K. Fritchman Warehouse (1915), 414 S 9th St, also known as the Swift & Co. warehouse
- Alexander T. Ellis Warehouse (1913), 410 S 9th St
- Anton Goreczky Block (1910), 312 S 9th, two buildings, also known as the W.P. Fuller & Co. warehouse or as Fosters Furniture warehouse. One of the Goreczky buildings may have replaced the Boise Sash and Door Co., owned by Goreczky. The Anton Goreczky House is listed on the National Register of Historic Places.
- Northrup Hardware Co. Building (1903), 401 S 8th St
- Coffin-Clinton Hardware Co. (1903), 405 S 8th St, designed by Tourtellotte & Co., also known as the Oakes & Co. warehouse
- John L. Day Building (1903), 409 S 8th St, designed by Tourtellotte & Co., also known as the Foster Building. The Day Building includes an unusual, three-part cornice.
- Capitol Brokerage & Commission Building (1902), 413 S 8th St
- Peasley Transfer & Storage Building (1902) 415 S 8th St, also known as Swift & Co.
- O.W. Smith Building (1902), 421 S 8th St
- O.W. Smith Building (1908), 501 S 8th St
- O.W. Smith Warehouse (1908), 513 S 8th St, also known as the Idaho Junk House
- William Udelavitz Building (1926), 521 S 8th St, also known as the Udelavitz Junk House or the Idaho Junk House
- Idaho Milling & Elevator Co. Building (1910), 416 S 8th St
- Idaho Candy Co. Building (1909), 412 S 8th St
- Carson & Lusk Warehouse (1906), 408 S 8th, original 3-story design by Tourtellotte & Co., 4-story remodel by Wayland & Fennell (1911)
- Falk Warehouse (1906), 404 S 8th, Tourtellotte and Hummel

== See also ==
- National Register of Historic Places listings in Ada County, Idaho
- National Register of Historic Places listings in Idaho
- List of National Historic Landmarks in Idaho
