= Sol Hasbrouck =

American politician (1833-1906)

Clerk of Idaho Supreme Court
- In office October 1890 – September 7, 1906
- Preceded by: position created
- Succeeded by: Ola Johnesse

Delegate to the Idaho Constitutional Convention
- In office July 4, 1889 – August 6, 1889
- Constituency: Washington County

Mayor of Boise, Idaho Territory
- In office July 20, 1885 – November 5, 1885
- Preceded by: James A. Pinney
- Succeeded by: James W. Huston

Clerk of Idaho Territorial Supreme Court
- In office 1868–1871

Member of the Idaho Territorial House of Representatives
- In office 1864
- Constituency: Owyhee County

Personal details
- Born: Solomon Hasbrouck; May 30, 1833 New Paltz, New York, U.S.
- Died: September 7, 1906 (aged 73) Boise, Idaho, U.S.
- Party: Republican (1860s); Democratic (1885); Republican (1889–1906)
- Spouse: Ann Eliza Van Wagenen (m. 1867)
- Children: 4
- Parents: Alexander Hasbrouck (father); Rachel Elting (mother)
- Relatives: Olive Hasbrouck (granddaughter); Hasbrouck family
- Profession: civil servant and politician
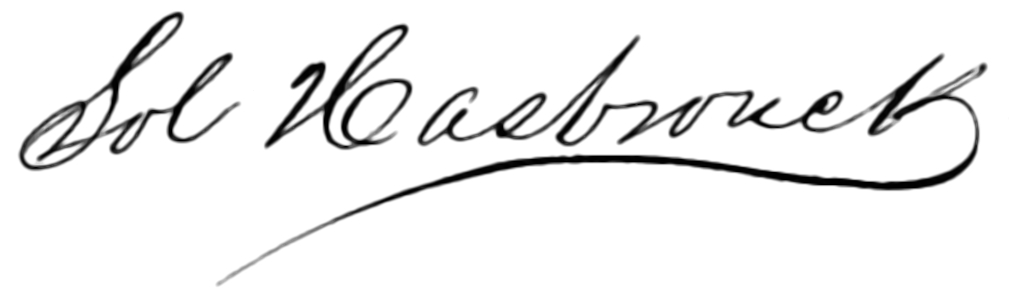
- Signature

Solomon Hasbrouck (May 30, 1833 – September 7, 1906) was an American politician and civil servant who was a pioneer of the Idaho Territory.

== Biography ==
Hasbrouck was born on May 30, 1833, in New Paltz, New York, the son of Alexander and Rachel (née Elting) Hasbrouck. His grandfather, Solomon P. Hasbrouck, was a prominent lumber manufacturer and merchant. The subject worked as a clerk in New York from age sixteen to twenty, then sailed from New York City to San Francisco in 1854. He settled in Nevada City, California, where he mined until 1860. He then secured a 160-acre claim near Santa Barbara, but, finding it largely worthless, allowed it to lapse back to the government. In 1861, he relocated to mine Granite Creek, Oregon, then departed in June 1862, a month before a major gold discovery at Granite Creek. He then settled to mine at Jordan Creek, in what was then the Washington Territory. After the Idaho Territory was organized, Owyhee County was the first new county that the territorial legislature organized, and the territorial governor appointed Hasbrouck as one of its original county commissioners over the winter of 1863–1864.

In 1864, Hasbrouck was elected by Owyhee County as a unionist to the Idaho Territorial House of Representatives. This session of the territorial legislature is most famous for moving the territorial capital from Lewiston to Boise. He then went on to work for the internal revenue service, and when his boss, John Cummins, was appointed to the Idaho Territorial Supreme Court in 1866, Hasbrouck was appointed as clerk of the district court that Cummins presided over. The following year, he returned to New York, married his former schoolmate, Ann Eliza Van Wagenen, and they returned to the Idaho Territory in 1868. They would have four children: Edward Hallock; Raymond DeLancy; Elizabeth M., Mrs. Charles D. Shrady; and Van Wagenen, father of actress Olive Hasbrouck. Upon his return to the territory, Hasbrouck was reappointed as clerk of the district court, as well as of the territorial supreme court. For the next three years, he clerked for the courts and the territorial superintendent of Indian affairs, worked as a gauger for the internal revenue service, and studied law.

In 1871, Hasbrouck opened a law firm with Henry E. Prickett in Boise. This lasted until 1875, when Prickett was appointed as a district judge, and soon thereafter elevated to the territorial supreme court. For the next twelve years, Hasbrouck worked as a merchant, first in Boise, then in Weiser. Hasbrouck won the 1885 Boise mayoral election as a Democrat, but resigned four months into his term, when he moved his business to Middleton, and thereafter to Weiser. A fire that wiped out most of Weiser destroyed his property. In 1889, territorial chief justice James H. Beatty appointed Hasbrouck as clerk of the local district court. That same year, he was elected as a Republican by Washington County as a delegate to the Idaho Constitutional Convention. When the state supreme court was formed in 1890, it selected Hasbrouck as its clerk, a position he maintained until his death at his home in Boise on September 7, 1906.

Political offices
Preceded by James A. Pinney	Mayor of Boise, Idaho Territory; 1885	Succeeded by James W. Huston
