= Lemp =

Lemp may refer to:

- Lemp (Dill), a river in Hesse, Germany
- Lemp family, brewers in St. Louis, Missouri, and places named after them:
  - Lemp Mansion
  - Lemp Neighborhood Arts Center
- Duncan Lemp, shooting victim in 2020 police raid on his residence in Montgomery County, Maryland
- Herbert Lemp (1884–1927), American politician
- Hermann Lemp (1862–1954), Swiss-American inventor
- Rebecca Lemp (d. 1590), German woman accused of witchcraft and burned at the stake
- Fritz-Julius Lemp (1913–1941), U-boat commander during World War II
- LEMP: Lightning Electromagnetic Pulse, see Electromagnetic_compatibility#Pulse_or_transient_interference
- LEMP software stack, a variation on the LAMP software bundle that uses Nginx rather than Apache HTTP Server, also known as LNMP
