= Richard Eardley =

American politician (1928-2012)

Dick Eardley

Mayor of Boise, Idaho
- In office January 1974 – January 1986
- Preceded by: Jay S. Amyx
- Succeeded by: Dirk Kempthorne

Personal details
- Born: December 23, 1928 Denver, Colorado, US
- Died: June 30, 2012 (aged 83) Boise, Idaho, US
- Spouse: Patricia L. Engum Eardley (m. 1950)
- Children: 3 sons
- Profession: Media, local politics

Richard Roy Eardley (December 23, 1928 – June 30, 2012) served three terms as mayor of Boise, Idaho, from 1974 to 1986.

Eardley served as mayor for a total of 12 years, longer than anyone else in Boise history until Dave Bieter won a fourth consecutive four-year term in 2015. In city history, only Eardley and Bieter have won three consecutive four-year terms as mayor. Eardley was re-elected in 1977 and 1981.

Born in Denver, Colorado, Eardley moved with his family to Baker, Oregon as a youth and graduated from Baker High School in 1947. He began his career in journalism and television and radio broadcasting, first at the weekly Record Courier newspaper KBKR radio in Baker. He and his wife Pat were married in 1950, and they moved to Boise five years later, where he worked for the Idaho Statesman newspaper (1955–58) and KBOI-TV and radio (1958–74) in news and sports. Eardley was elected to the Boise City Council in 1969 and served four years before being elected mayor in 1973.

Political offices
Preceded by Jay S. Amyx	Mayor of Boise, Idaho; 1974–1986	Succeeded by Dirk Kempthorne
