= Austin Walker =

American politician (1883–1945)

Mayor of Boise, Idaho
- In office May 11, 1942 – October 31, 1945
- Preceded by: H. W. Whillock
- Succeeded by: Sam S. Griffin

Personal details
- Born: January 5, 1883 Gary, Minnesota, United States
- Died: October 31, 1945 (aged 62) Boise, Idaho, United States

Austin Walker (January 5, 1883 – October 31, 1945) served as mayor of Boise, Idaho, from 1942 to 1945.

Walker had served as acting mayor since February 1942 as the incumbent, H. W. Whillock, was a United States Navy officer during World War II. Walker was appointed mayor after Whillock formally resigned in May of that year. He was elected in his own right in 1943.

Walker died in October 1945 and was succeeded by Sam S. Griffin.

== Sources ==
- Mayors of Boise - Past and Present
- Idaho State Historical Society Reference Series, Corrected List of Mayors, 1867-1996

Political offices
Preceded by H. W. Whillock	Mayor of Boise, Idaho; 1942–1945	Succeeded by Sam S. Griffin
