= J. W. Robinson (mayor) =

American politician

28th Mayor of Boise
- In office April 4, 1915 – June 1, 1916
- Preceded by: Arthur Hodges
- Succeeded by: S. H. Hays

Personal details
- Born: July 18, 1860 Owensboro, Kentucky, U.S.
- Died: January 13, 1939 (aged 78) Boise, Idaho, U.S.
- Education: National Normal University

Jeremiah William Robinson (July 18, 1860 – January 13, 1939) was an American politician who served as mayor of Boise, Idaho, from 1915 to 1916. Robinson was the subject of a successful recall election in 1916 on June 1, and was succeeded by S. H. Hays.

== Early life and education ==
Born in Owensboro, Kentucky, on July 18, 1860, to parents George H. and Caroline L. (Heard) Robinson, J. W. Robinson was the third of six sons. He was raised on his family's farm and educated in the public school system. After finishing his public school education, he then went on to a college in Carrollton and later attended the National Normal University in Lebanon, Ohio, where he graduated at twenty-one years of age, having completed a scientific course.

== Career ==
After graduating from college, Robinson worked as a teacher in Kentucky and Tennessee before moving to Kansas City, Missouri, where he was a clerk in a department store for a short time. In 1885, he traveled to Elk City, Kansas, and later to Syracuse, and then to Richfield. While in Syracuse and Richfield, he held bank positions, specifically that of a cashier. Throughout this time, he began to study law was admitted to the bar in Kansas in 1889.

Shortly after in 1890, he traveled west to Idaho, where he went into the practice of law in Boise. In 1891, he was appointed chief clerk in the Assay Office. He remained at this position for seventeen consecutive years, later resigning in 1908 to become cashier of the Idaho Trust & Savings Bank where he stayed for three years. He then went back to his old position and then did various accounting jobs for the state and in 1914 acted as deputy state treasurer for six months. Then, in 1915, he was elected mayor of Boise. During his tenure, he drove out the saloons and gambling houses and also closed the red light district. Robinson was recalled as mayor on June 1, 1916. After the successful recall, he returned to the United States Assay Commission, where he did auditing and accounting work.

== Personal life ==
Robinson married Carrie Cruson on March 21, 1888, and they went on to have three children.

== Sources ==
- Mayors of Boise - Past and Present
- Idaho State Historical Society Reference Series, Corrected List of Mayors, 1867-1996

Political offices
Preceded by Arthur Hodges	Mayor of Boise, Idaho; 1916–1919	Succeeded by S. H. Hays
