= Robert L. Day =

American politician (1920-1999)

Mayor of Boise, Idaho
- In office May 1959 – May 1961
- Preceded by: R. E. Edlefsen
- Succeeded by: Eugene W. Shellworth

Personal details
- Born: January 2, 1920
- Died: January 25, 1999 (aged 79)

Robert L. Day (January 2, 1920 – January 25, 1999) was an American politician who served a single term as mayor of Boise, Idaho, from 1959 to 1961.

Political offices
Preceded by R. E. Edlefsen	Mayor of Boise, Idaho; 1959–1961	Succeeded by Eugene W. Shellworth
