= Sandy Shellworth =

American alpine skier (1944–2019)

Personal information
- Born: June 22, 1944 Annapolis, Maryland, U.S.
- Died: January 10, 2019 (aged 74)
- Height: 5 ft 8 in (1.73 m)

Skiing career
- Sport: Alpine skiing
- Club: Bogus Basin (ID)
- Retired: 1968
- Disciplines: Downhill, giant slalom
- World Cup debut: January 1967 (age 22) (inaugural season)

Olympics
- Teams: 1 – (1968)
- Medals: 0

World Championships
- Teams: 1 – (1968 Olympics)
- Medals: 0

World Cup
- Seasons: 2 – (1967–68)
- Podiums: 0
- Overall titles: 0
- Discipline titles: 0
Medal record
Women's alpine skiing
Representing the United States
U.S. Alpine Championships
Gold medal – first place	1967 Missoula	Giant slalom

Sandra "Sandy" Shellworth (December 18, 1944 – January 10, 2019) was an alpine ski racer from the United States.

Born in Annapolis, Maryland, Shellworth was raised in Boise, Idaho, where her father, Eugene Shellworth was mayor (1961–66). A 1962 graduate of Boise High, she raced for Bogus Basin, the University of Colorado Boulder, and the U.S. Ski Team.

Shellworth won the Roch Cup downhill in Aspen in 1967, and was the 1967 U.S. Champion in giant slalom at Missoula, but broke her leg hours later training for the downhill. Shellworth was the first woman from CU to participate in the Olympics; she competed in the 1968 Winter Olympics at Grenoble and finished 21st in the women's downhill at Chamrousse. Her best finish in a World Cup event was 12th in the downhill at Schruns, Austria, in January 1967.

== Olympic results ==
Year	Age	Slalom	Giant slalom	Super-G	Downhill	Combined
1968	23	—	—	not run	21	not run

- From 1948 through 1980, the alpine skiing events at the Winter Olympics also served as the World Championships, held every two years.
