= R. E. Edlefsen =

American politician (1906-1986)

Mayor of Boise, Idaho
- In office May 1951 – May 1959
- Preceded by: Potter P. Howard
- Succeeded by: Robert L. Day

Personal details
- Born: September 30, 1906 Preston, Idaho, United States
- Died: December 1986 (aged 80) Boise, Idaho, United States

Russell Elmer Edlefsen (September 30, 1906 – December 1986) served four terms as mayor of Boise, Idaho, from 1951 to 1959. Elected to two-year terms, Edlefsen was the only person in to win four consecutive terms as Boise mayor until David H. Bieter accomplished the feat in 2015.

== Sources ==
- Mayors of Boise - Past and Present
- Idaho State Historical Society Reference Series, Corrected List of Mayors, 1867-1996
- Guide to the Russell E.Edlefsen Scrapbooks 1951-1959

Political offices
Preceded by Potter P. Howard	Mayor of Boise, Idaho; 1951–1959	Succeeded by Eugene W. Shellworth
