= S. H. Hays =

American politician (1864–1934)

29th Mayor of Boise
- In office June 6, 1916 – April 26, 1919
- Preceded by: J. W. Robinson
- Succeeded by: Ernest G. Eagleson

4th Attorney General of Idaho
- In office 1899–1901
- Governor: Frank Steunenberg
- Preceded by: Robert McFarland
- Succeeded by: Frank Martin

Personal details
- Born: May 18, 1864 Juneau, Wisconsin, U.S.
- Died: November 17, 1934 (aged 70) Boise, Idaho, U.S.
- Party: Democratic
- Spouse: Gertrude Lindsey
- Relations: James B. Hays (father)
- Education: Northwestern College
- Profession: Attorney

Samuel Hubbard Hays (May 18, 1864 – November 17, 1934) was an American politician and attorney who served as the Idaho Attorney General from January 2, 1899, until January 7, 1901, and as mayor of Boise, Idaho, from 1916 to 1919.

== Early life and education ==
Samuel Hays was born in Juneau, Wisconsin, May 18, 1864, the eldest of three children. His father, James B. Hays, was a politician, attorney, and jurist who served as a member of the Wisconsin State Assembly. Samuel attended Wisconsin public schools, including high school at Horicon. He studied one year at Northwestern College in Watertown (now Martin Luther College), then he became a teacher at Iron Ridge. He also read law with his father.

James Hays became Chief Justice of the Idaho Territorial Supreme Court in 1885, and the family moved to Idaho Territory, where Samuel became deputy clerk of the Bingham County circuit court in Blackfoot, Idaho. James Hays died in office in 1888.

== Career ==
Samuel Hays served as clerk of the Second District of the U.S. Territorial Court in Blackfoot, and he moved to Boise in 1888 as clerk of the Third District. He was admitted to the bar in Idaho Territory in 1889 and soon practiced law in Boise. In 1894 and 1895, he served on the Boise City Council, and he served as Idaho Attorney General from 1899 to 1901 during the administration of Governor Steunenberg. While attorney general, Hays authored the proclamation of martial law during the Coeur d'Alene riots.

Hays helped to organize the Boise Title and Trust Co., and he became president of the firm in 1911.

In 1916, a recall election was organized against Boise mayor Jeremiah Robinson as a result of his efforts to close saloons, end gambling, and shut brothels. Hays won the election and finished Robinson's term, then he won reelection and served a full two-year term as mayor from 1917 to 1919.

== Personal life ==
Samuel Hays married Gertrude Lindsey March 1, 1888, and the family included six children. One child died in infancy. The Samuel Hays House (1892) is listed on the National Register of Historic Places. Architects Tourtellotte & Hummel remodeled the house in 1926.

Political offices
Preceded by J. W. Robinson	Mayor of Boise, Idaho; 1916–1919	Succeeded by Ernest G. Eagleson
