= Walter F. Hansen =

American politician

Mayor of Boise, Idaho
- In office May 6, 1927 – April 30, 1929
- Preceded by: Herbert F. Lemp
- Succeeded by: James P. Pope

Personal details
- Born: April 19, 1877 Denmark
- Died: November 8, 1965 (aged 88) Butte County, California, United States

Walter Fritz Hansen (April 19, 1877 – November 8, 1965) was a Danish-born American politician who served as mayor of Boise, Idaho, from 1927 to 1929.

Hansen was appointed mayor to serve almost all of the two-year term of his predecessor Herbert F. Lemp, who died only four days after taking office.

== Sources ==
- Mayors of Boise - Past and Present
- Idaho State Historical Society Reference Series, Corrected List of Mayors, 1867-1996

Political offices
Preceded by Herbert F. Lemp	Mayor of Boise, Idaho; 1927–1929	Succeeded by James P. Pope
