= Anton Goreczky House =

Historic house in Boise, Idaho

- U.S. National Register of Historic Places
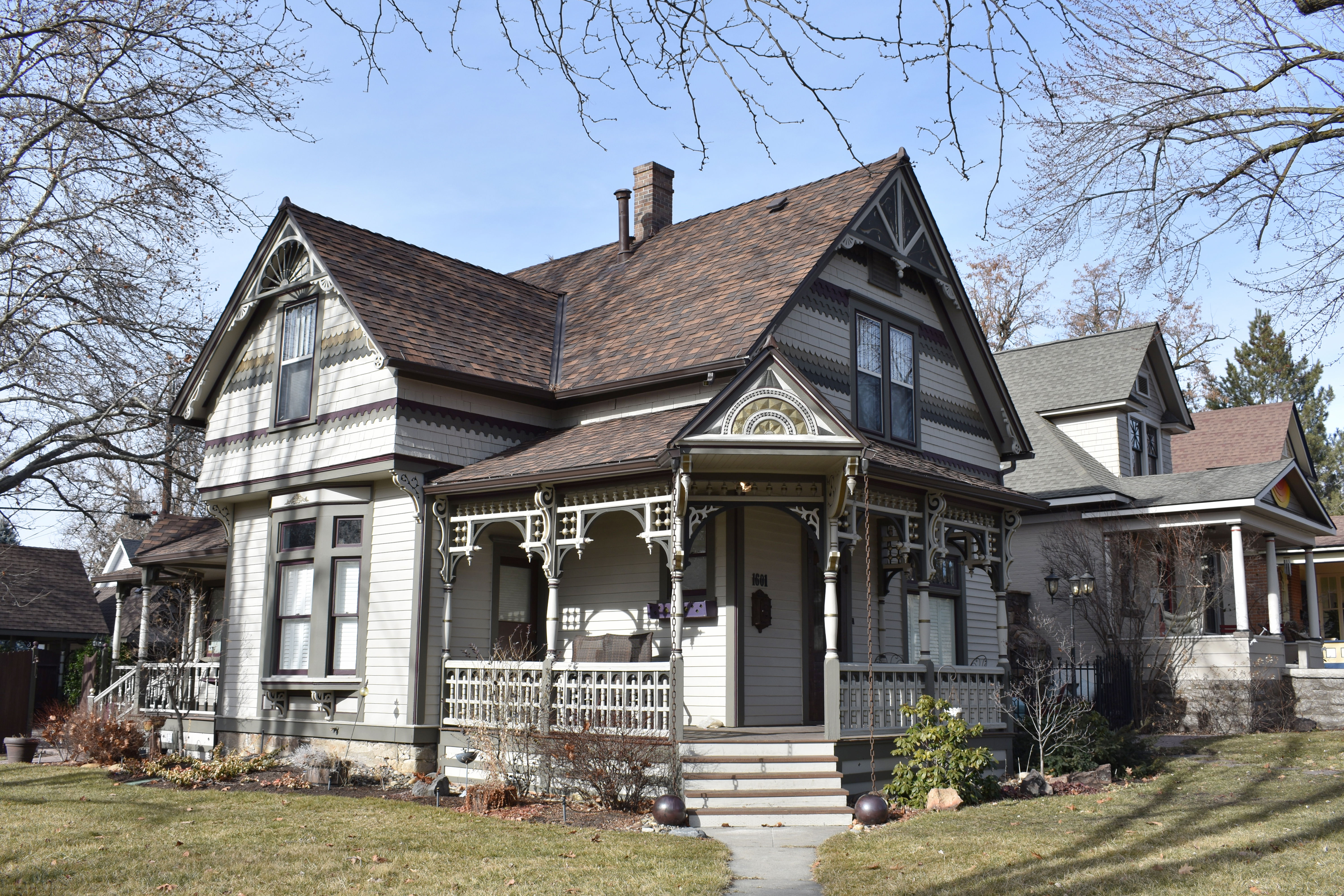
- The Anton Goreczky House in 2019

- Location within Idaho Location within the United States
- Location: 1601 N. Seventh St., Boise, Idaho
- Coordinates: 43.62858°N 116.19665°W
- Area: less than one acre
- Built: 1898
- Architectural style: Queen Anne
- NRHP reference No.: 86000438
- Added to NRHP: March 20, 1986

The Anton Goreczky House in Boise, Idaho, is a 1 1/2-story, Queen Anne house constructed in 1898. The house features a wraparound porch with elaborate brackets, arches, and spandrels.

Anton and Mary Goreczky lived at the Goreczky house from 1898 until Anton Goreczky's death in 1934. Goreczky was a journeyman carpenter and owner of the Boise Sash and Door Factory.

== See also ==
South Eighth Street Historic District
