= Nampa station =

- Nampa Depot
- U.S. National Register of Historic Places
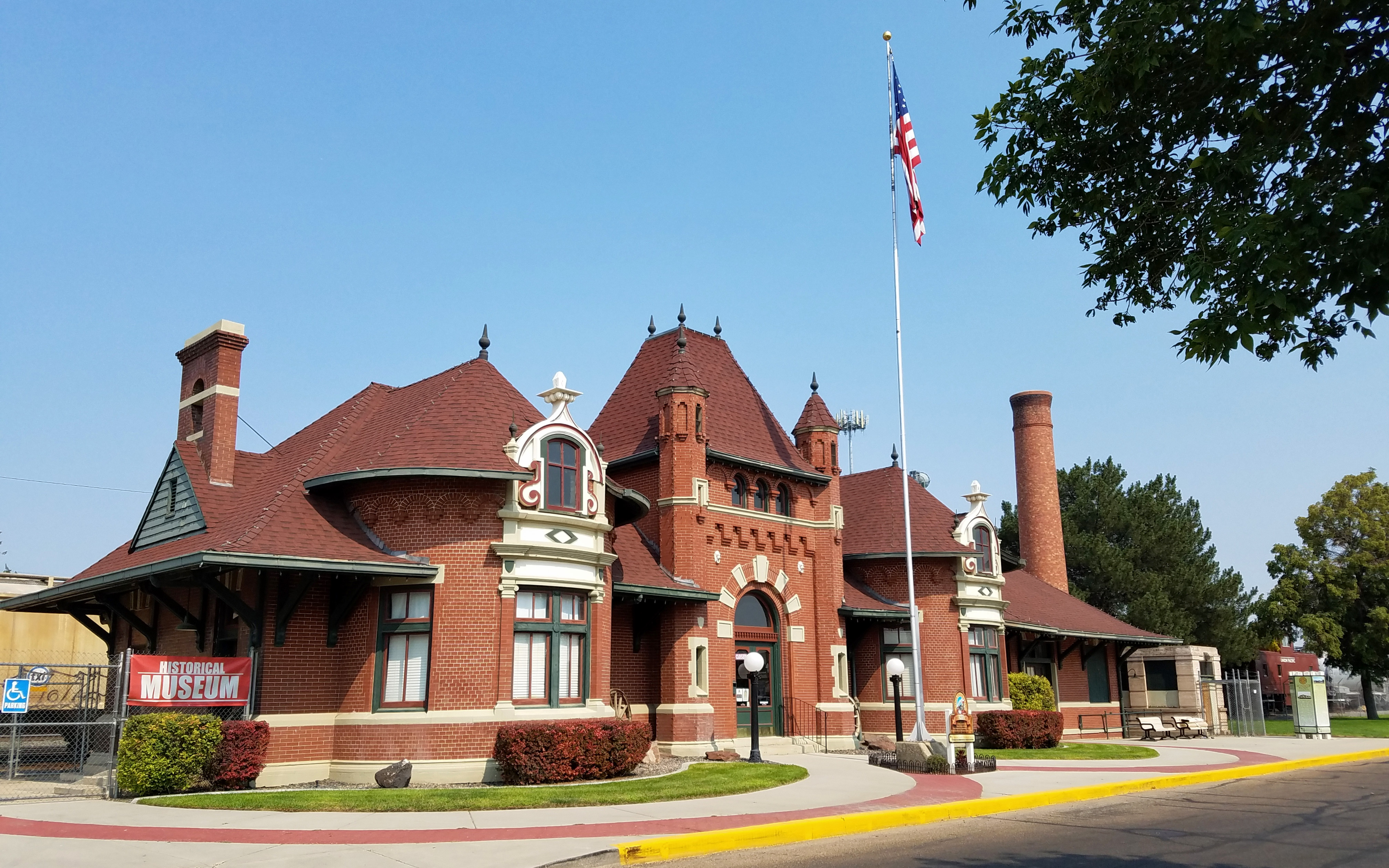
- The Nampa Depot in 2018

- Location within Idaho Location within the United States
- Location: 12th Ave. and Front St., Nampa, Idaho
- Coordinates: 43.5797222°N 116.5586111°W
- Area: less than one acre
- Built: 1903
- Architect: Clarke, F.W.; Et al.
- Architectural style: Mixed (more Than 2 Styles From Different Periods)
- NRHP reference No.: 72000438
- Added to NRHP: November 3, 1972

The Nampa Depot in Nampa, Idaho, is a former passenger station on the Oregon Short Line Railroad, designed by Frederick W. Clarke. The 1-story, brick and sandstone depot was described in 1972 by Arthur A. Hart, director of the Idaho State Historical Museum, as "an interesting eclectic combination of Romanesque, Renaissance, and Baroque elements, with the latter dominating. A massive central block of French Renaissance form is flanked by two advancing Baroque bays that bulge dramatically forward." The depot was added to the National Register of Historic Places in 1972.

== History ==
Soon after the founding of Nampa, a wood frame railway station was opened in 1887 at the connection between the Oregon Short Line Railroad and the Idaho Central Railway. The station quickly became insufficient to manage Nampa's passenger and freight traffic, and in 1902 a new station was planned.

The Nampa Depot opened in 1903, and it operated as a station until 1927 when a new depot was constructed. The 1903 depot was converted to office space for railroad employees in 1927, and it became the Nampa headquarters for the Canyon County Historical Society in 1973.

Preceding station	Amtrak	Following station
Ontario toward Seattle	Pioneer	Boise toward Chicago
Preceding station	Union Pacific Railroad	Following station
Caldwell toward Portland	Portland – Granger	Meridian toward Granger
