= Byron E. Hyatt =

American politician (1873–1936)

Mayor of Boise, Idaho
- In office May 1, 1935 – November 11, 1936
- Preceded by: J. J. McCue
- Succeeded by: J. L. Edlefsen

Personal details
- Born: September 3, 1873
- Died: November 11, 1936 (aged 63)

Byron Ernest Hyatt (September 3, 1873 – November 11, 1936) served as mayor of Boise, Idaho, from 1935 to 1936.

Hyatt died in office in November 1936. J. L. Edlefsen was appointed to finish his term as mayor.

Political offices
Preceded by J. J. McCue	Mayor of Boise, Idaho; 1935–1936	Succeeded by J. L. Edlefsen
