= Harry Fritchman =

American politician

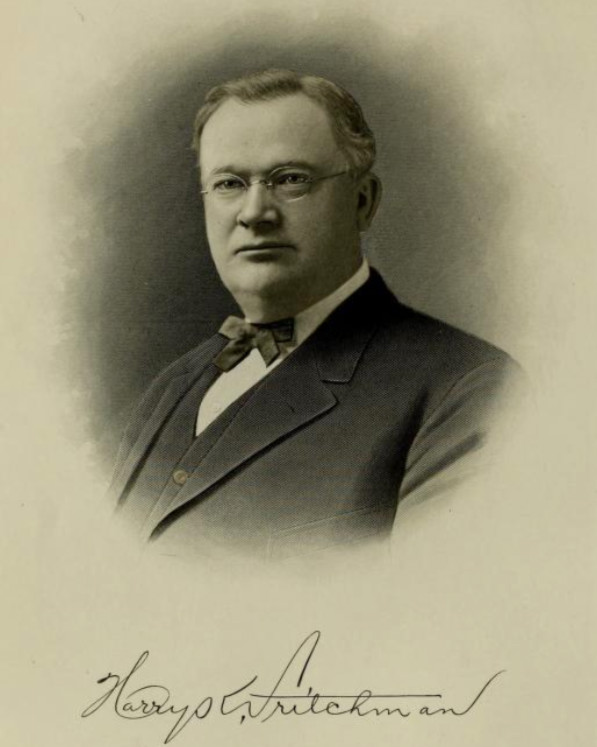
- Harry K. Fritchman in the early 20th century

Mayor of Boise, Idaho
- In office April 8, 1911 – May 25, 1912
- Preceded by: J. T. Pence
- Succeeded by: Arthur Hodges

Personal details
- Born: Harry K. Fritchman; February 10, 1865 Westmoreland County, Pennsylvania
- Died: May 31, 1942 (aged 77) Boise, Idaho
- Party: Republican
- Spouse: Leota A. Sickel
- Profession: Merchandise broker

Harry K. Fritchman (February 10, 1865 - May 31, 1942) was a merchandise broker and warehouse owner in Boise, Idaho, USA, in the first half of the 20th century, and Fritchman served as mayor of Boise 1911–12.

== Early life and education ==
Fritchman was born in Westmoreland County, Pennsylvania, in 1865. He was the eighth child in a family of eleven children born to John and Susan (Linn) Fritchman. The family moved to a farm in Andrew County, Missouri, the year of Fritchman's birth. A student at public school in Andrew County, Fritchman learned to read from McGuffey Readers, and he studied Ray's Arithmetic. He left his family farm at age 23 to clerk at Pierce & Roberts grocery in Savannah, Missouri.

== Career ==
Fritchman moved to St. Joseph, Missouri, and worked for wholesale grocers Nave & McCord. He became a commercial traveler selling wholesale merchandise for Nave & McCord, later for various employers, and his work brought him to Idaho in 1888. He moved to Boise in 1900, but in 1901 he moved again to Portland, Oregon, returning to Boise in 1904. Fritchman built a 2-story warehouse in 1910 and operated a wholesale merchandise and grocery company, acting as agent for 30 manufacturers.

In 1911 he ran for mayor of Boise, winning the election by a comfortable margin, but he served only one year.

In 1912 Fritchman sold his warehouse and a half-interest in his wholesale business to Reilly Atkinson. The new firm operated briefly under the name, Fritchman-Atkinson Co., then as Reilly Atkinson & Co. The Boise Stone Company at Table Rock was organized in 1912 with Fritchman as general manager.

By 1916 Fritchman had become interested in real estate, and he purchased half of the mortgage brokerage firm of Ira E. High & Co. He continued with real estate until his death.

== Death ==
Fritchman died of a heart attack at his home in Boise on May 31, 1942.

== See also ==
- Fritchman warehouse, South Eighth Street Historic District
- H. K. Fritchman House
- List of mayors of Boise, Idaho

Political offices
Preceded by J. T. Pence	Mayor of Boise; 1911-1912	Succeeded by Arthur Hodges
