= Charles Himrod =

American politician

Mayor of Boise, Idaho Territory
- In office January 16, 1869 – July 12, 1872
- Preceded by: Thomas B. Hart
- Succeeded by: George H. Twitchell

Mayor of Boise, Idaho Territory
- In office July 8, 1878 – July 14, 1879
- Preceded by: Thomas E. Logan
- Succeeded by: Cyrus Y. Jacobs

Personal details
- Born: November 4, 1842; Burdett, New York
- Died: January 26, 1920 (aged 77); Boise, Idaho

Charles Himrod (November 4, 1842 – January 26, 1920) was an American politician who served four one-year terms as mayor of Boise, Idaho Territory, in the 1860s and 1870s. He was elected in 1869, 1870 and 1878. The 1871 election winner, John Hailey, never took office, so he served that term as well.

Political offices
| Preceded by Thomas B. Hart | Mayor of Boise, Idaho Territory; 1869–1872 | Succeeded by George H. Twitchell |
| Preceded by Thomas E. Logan | Mayor of Boise, Idaho Territory; 1878–1879 | Succeeded by Cyrus Y. Jacobs |
