= Sam S. Griffin =

American politician (1892–1951)

Mayor of Boise, Idaho
- In office October 31, 1945 – February 25, 1946
- Preceded by: Austin Walker
- Succeeded by: H. W. Whillock

Personal details
- Born: January 3, 1892 Tekamah, Nebraska, United States
- Died: October 18, 1951 (aged 59) Boise, Idaho, United States

Samuel Spielman Griffin (January 3, 1892 – October 18, 1951) served briefly as mayor of Boise, Idaho, in 1945 and 1946.

Griffin succeeded Austin Walker, who died in office in October 1945. Griffin resigned four months later and was succeeded by former mayor H. W. Whillock.

== Sources ==
- Mayors of Boise - Past and Present
- Idaho State Historical Society Reference Series, Corrected List of Mayors, 1867-1996

Political offices
Preceded by Austin Walker	Mayor of Boise, Idaho; 1945–1946	Succeeded by H. W. Whillock
