= H. K. Fritchman House =

- U.S. National Register of Historic Places
- The H.K. Fritchman House in 1980

- Location within Idaho Location within the United States
- Location: 1207 W. Hays St., Boise, Idaho
- Coordinates: 43°37′25″N 116°12′09″W
- Area: less than one acre
- Built: 1904
- Architect: Tourtellotte, John E. & Company
- Architectural style: Colonial, Shingled Colonial
- MPS: Tourtellotte and Hummel Architecture TR
- NRHP reference No.: 82000202
- Added to NRHP: November 17, 1982

The H.K. Fritchman House in Boise, Idaho, was a 1 1/2-story Colonial Revival cottage designed by Tourtellotte & Co. and constructed in 1904. The house featured an off-center, pedimented porch with Doric columns, decorative window head moldings under the side gables, and a prominent, pedimented front gable with dimple window centered below the lateral ridge beam. The house was added to the National Register of Historic Places (NRHP) in 1982. The house was demolished in 1987. Officials from the Idaho State Historic Preservation Office took documentary photographs of the interior and artifacts including radiators, leaded windows, and a banister were removed. The banister was donated to the Basque Center in Boise, Idaho and other items went to similar houses in the area.

Harry Fritchman was a commercial traveler or traveling salesman based in Boise. He lived briefly in Portland, Oregon, then returned to Boise in 1904, the year the H.K. Fritchman House was constructed. Fritchman served one year, as mayor of Boise 1911—1912.

A second H.K. Fritchman House was constructed at 1707 Harrison Boulevard in 1920, and it is a contributing resource in Boise's Harrison Boulevard Historic District. At the time of his death, Harry Fritchman was living two blocks from the second house, at 1606 N. 17th St.

== See also ==
- Fort Street Historic District
- National Register of Historic Places listings in Ada County, Idaho
