= Case Broderick =

American politician

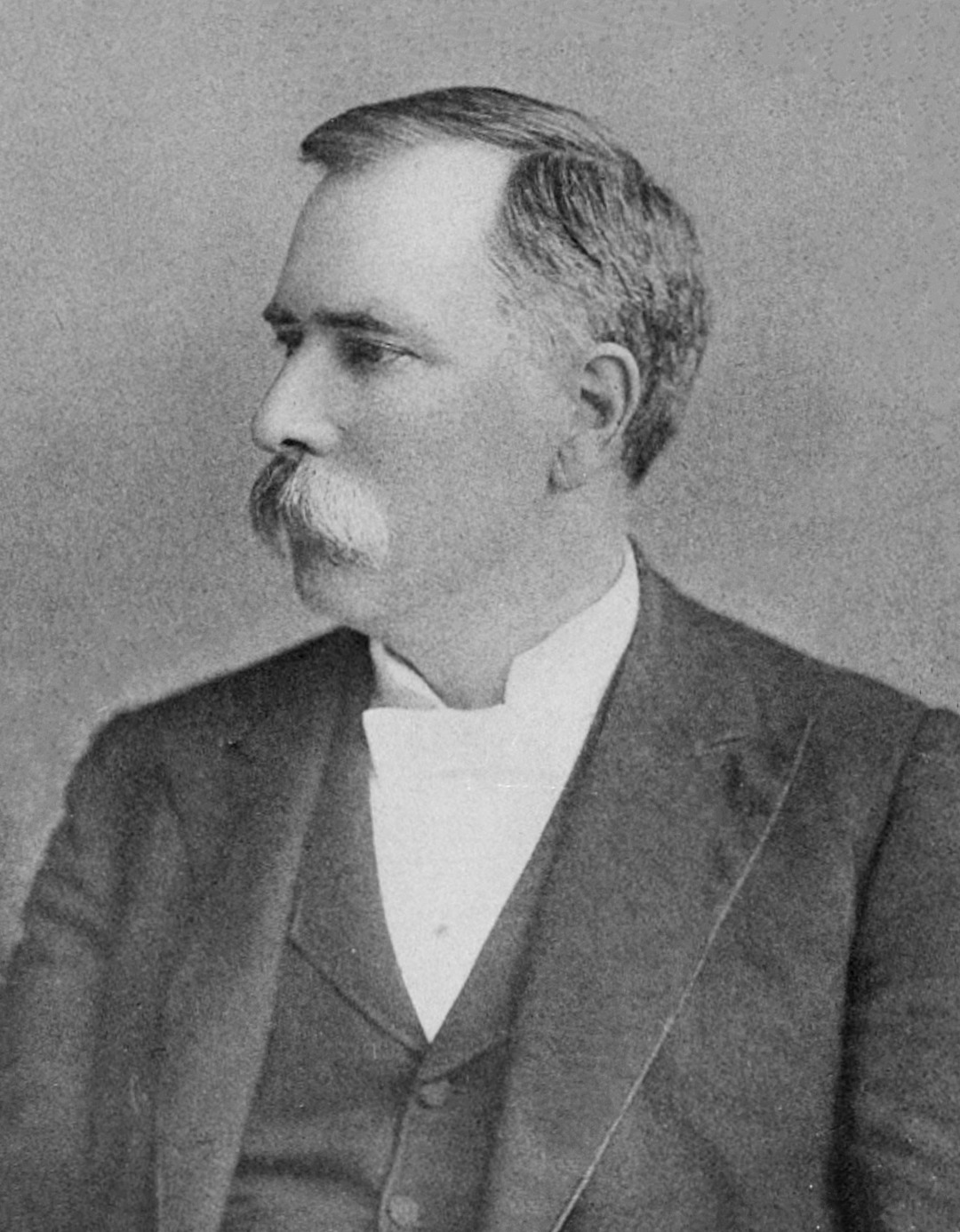

Member of the U.S. House of Representatives from Kansas's 1st district
- In office March 4, 1891 – March 3, 1899
- Preceded by: Edmund N. Morrill
- Succeeded by: Charles Curtis

Associate Justice of the Idaho Territorial Supreme Court
- In office March 24, 1884 – August 10, 1888
- Appointed by: Chester A. Arthur
- Preceded by: Henry E. Prickett
- Succeeded by: Charles H. Berry

Member of the Kansas Senate
- In office 1880–1884

Personal details
- Born: September 23, 1839 Marion, Indiana, U.S.
- Died: April 1, 1920 (aged 80) Holton, Kansas, U.S.
- Party: Republican
- Spouse: Mary Ann Ewbank (m. 1860; died 1888)
- Children: 6
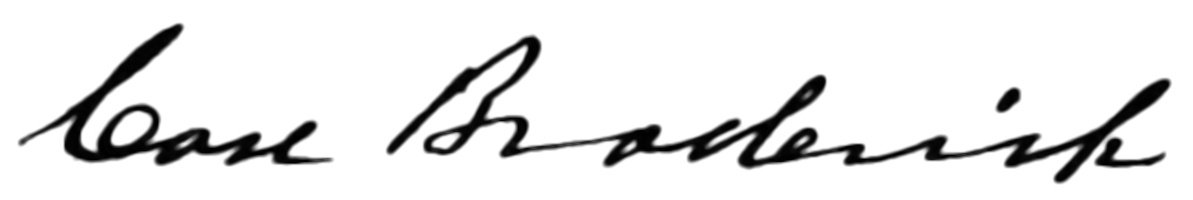
- Signature

Military service
- Allegiance: United States of America
- Branch/service: Union Army
- Years of service: 1863–1865
- Unit: Kansas 2nd Light Artillery Battery
- Battles/wars: Civil War

Broderick family home in Holton, Kansas.

Case Broderick (September 23, 1839 – April 1, 1920) was an American politician and jurist who served as Associate Justice of the Idaho Territorial Supreme Court from 1884 to 1888 and as U.S. Representative from Kansas from 1891 to 1899.

== Early life, education and marriage ==
Case Broderick was born in 1839 near Marion, Indiana, a son of Samuel Broderick and Mary (Snider or Snyder) Broderick. Broderick attended the common schools in Indiana. He was a cousin of David Colbreth Broderick, of Washington, DC; New York, and California; and Andrew Kennedy of California, who also became national politicians.

He moved at age 19 to Holton, Kansas, in 1858, engaging in agricultural pursuits. Case Broderick married Mary Ann Ewbank on August 23, 1860, in Jackson County, Kansas Territory. Mary was born in Dearborn County in Southeast Indiana, May 12, 1831, and died November 13, 1888.

During the Civil War, Broderick enlisted as a private in the Kansas 2nd Light Artillery Battery 27 May 1863 and was mustered out at Leavenworth 11 August 1865.

== Political career ==
He studied law with an established firm and was admitted to the bar in 1870, starting his practice in Holton, Kansas. He joined the Republican Party was elected as mayor of Holton in 1874 and 1875. He served as prosecuting attorney of Jackson County from 1876 to 1880. Broderick was elected to two terms in the Kansas Senate, serving from 1880 to 1884.

On March 18, 1884, Brocerick was nominated by President Chester A. Arthur to be Associate Justice of the Idaho Territorial Supreme Court, and he was confirmed by the senate six days later, and he moved to Boise, Idaho Territory. After his four-year term had expired, he served until his successor arrived on August 10, 1888, and several days later, he returned to Holton, Kansas, and resumed the practice of law.

Broderick was elected as a Republican to the fifty-second and three succeeding congresses, serving from March 4, 1891, to March 3, 1899. He was an unsuccessful candidate for renomination in 1898.

He again engaged in the practice of law in Holton, Kansas. Retiring from the practice of law, he devoted his time to farming and livestock interests. He died in Holton, April 1, 1920, and was interred in Holton Cemetery.

U.S. House of Representatives
Preceded by Edmund N. Morrill	Member of the U.S. House of Representatives from Kansas's 1st congressional district 1891 – 1899	Succeeded by Charles Curtis
