= James W. Huston (mayor) =

American politician

Mayor of Boise, Idaho Territory
- In office December 28, 1885 – July 18, 1887
- Preceded by: Sol Hasbrouck
- Succeeded by: Peter J. Pefley

James W. Huston served as mayor of Boise, Idaho Territory, from 1885 to 1887.

Huston was appointed mayor by the Boise City Council in November 1885 to complete the term of Sol Hasbrouck even though Huston was neither a member of the city council nor present at the meeting. He was sworn in more than a month later.

== Sources ==
- Mayors of Boise - Past and Present
- Idaho State Historical Society Reference Series, Corrected List of Mayors, 1867-1996

Political offices
Preceded by Sol Hasbrouck	Mayor of Boise, Idaho Territory; 1885–1887	Succeeded by Peter J. Pefley
