= Ross Cady =

American politician from Idaho

Mayor of Boise, Idaho
- In office February 13, 1933 – May 1, 1933
- Preceded by: James P. Pope
- Succeeded by: J. J. McCue

Personal details
- Born: October 29, 1884 Hubbard, Iowa, United States
- Died: May 22, 1959 (aged 74) Clatsop County, Oregon, United States

Ross Cady (1884-1959) was an American politician from Idaho. Cady served briefly as mayor of Boise, Idaho in 1933.

== Early life ==
On October 29, 1884, Cady was born in Hubbard, Iowa.

== Career ==
In military, Cady enlisted during World War II in the United States military in Holl Boise, Idaho.

In 1933, Cady was appointed mayor of Boise, Idaho. Cady served the remainder of the term of James P. Pope, who resigned after being elected to the United States Senate.

Political offices
Preceded by James P. Pope	Mayor of Boise, Idaho; 1933	Succeeded by J. J. McCue
