= Rattlesnake Wilderness =

Wilderness area in Montana, United States

- IUCN category Ib (wilderness area)
- Location within the United States
- Location: Missoula County, Montana, USA
- Nearest city: Missoula
- Coordinates: 47°02′N 113°50′W
- Area: 32,976 acres (133.45 km^{2})
- Established: October 19, 1980
- Governing body: U.S. Forest Service

The Rattlesnake Wilderness is located in the U.S. state of Montana. Created by an act of Congress in 1980, the wilderness is within Lolo National Forest and is located only 4 miles (6.5 km) north of Missoula, Montana. The wilderness area is a component of the Rattlesnake National Recreation Area. It protects much of the high country of the Rattlesnake Mountains.

U.S. Wilderness Areas largely do not allow motorized or mechanized vehicles, and bicycles can only be ridden as far as the Wilderness boundary. Although camping and fishing are allowed with proper permit, no roads or buildings are constructed and there is also no logging or mining, in compliance with the 1964 Wilderness Act. Wilderness areas within National Forests and Bureau of Land Management areas also allow hunting in season.
