= Potter P. Howard =

American politician (1890-1956)

Mayor of Boise, Idaho
- In office May 5, 1947 – May 1951
- Preceded by: H. W. Whillock
- Succeeded by: R. E. Edlefsen

Personal details
- Born: October 4, 1890 Sidney, Nebraska, U.S.
- Died: November 29, 1956 (aged 66) Salt Lake City, Utah, U.S.
- Resting place: Morris Hill Cemetery; Boise, Idaho
- Spouse: Marene E. Platz Howard
- Children: 4
- Profession: Automobile dealer, business executive

Potter P. Howard (October 4, 1890 – November 29, 1956) served consecutive two-year terms as mayor of Boise, Idaho, from 1947 to 1951. An automobile dealer when elected, he was later an executive with the local natural gas company in Boise. Potter died in a Salt Lake City hotel while returning to Idaho from a business trip to Chicago.

Potter moved from Burley to Boise in 1935; he is buried at Morris Hill Cemetery in Boise.

== Sources ==
- Mayors of Boise - Past and Present
- Idaho State Historical Society Reference Series, Corrected List of Mayors, 1867-1996

Political offices
Preceded by H. W. Whillock	Mayor of Boise, Idaho; 1947–1951	Succeeded by R. E. Edlefsen
