= James L. Straight =

American politician (1909–1981)

Mayor of Boise, Idaho
- In office April 29, 1939 – April 19, 1941
- Preceded by: J. L. Edlefsen
- Succeeded by: H. W. Whillock

Personal details
- Born: James Luther Straight; January 31, 1909 Boise, Idaho, United States
- Died: August 20, 1981 (aged 72) Tustin, California, United States

James Luther Straight (January 31, 1909 – August 20, 1981) served a single term as mayor of Boise, Idaho, from 1939 to 1941.

== Sources ==
- Mayors of Boise - Past and Present
- Idaho State Historical Society Reference Series, Corrected List of Mayors, 1867-1996

Political offices
Preceded by J. L. Edlefsen	Mayor of Boise, Idaho; 1939–1941	Succeeded by H. W. Whillock
