= Samuel Hays House =

Historic house in Idaho, United States

- U.S. National Register of Historic Places
- U.S. Historic district – Contributing property
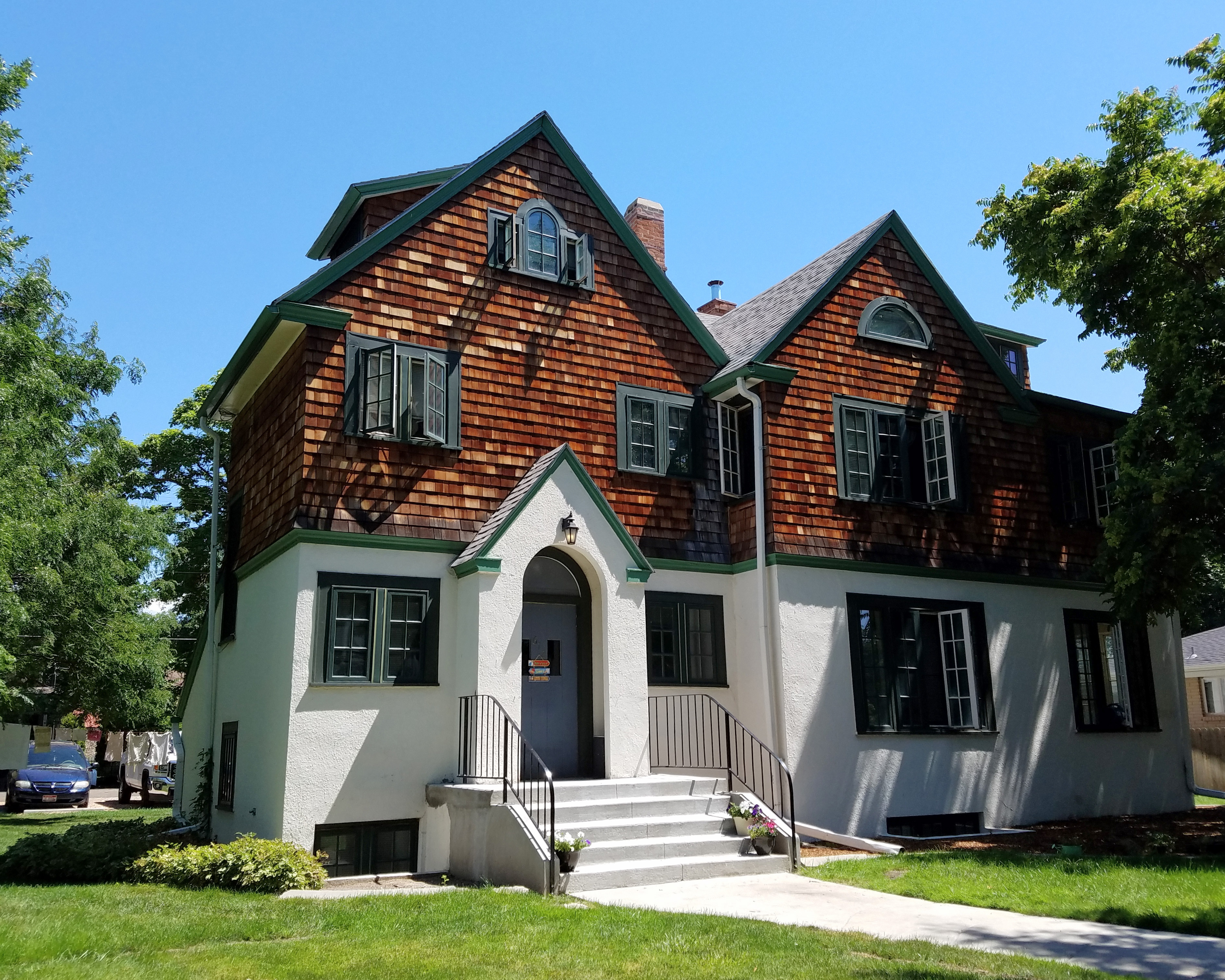
- The Samuel Hays House in 2018

- Location within Idaho Location within the United States
- Location: 612 Franklin St. Boise, Idaho
- Coordinates: 43°37′11″N 116°11′46″W
- Area: less than one acre
- Built: 1927
- Architect: Tourtellotte & Hummel
- Part of: Fort Street Historic District (ID82000199)
- MPS: Tourtellotte and Hummel Architecture TR
- NRHP reference No.: 82000208
- Added to NRHP: November 17, 1982

The Samuel Hays House, was designed by an unknown architect and constructed in 1892 for Samuel H. Hays in Boise, Idaho, USA. The house was remodeled by Tourtellotte & Hummel 1926–1927 to include six apartments. Part of Boise's Fort Street Historic District, the house was individually listed on the National Register of Historic Places November 17, 1982. At the time, the Fort Street Historic District also had been listed November 12, 1982.

Samuel Hays was an attorney who served as Idaho Attorney General during the administration of Governor Steunenberg. Hays also became mayor of Boise in 1916 and served until the 1919 election.
