= James A. Pinney =

American politician

Mayor of Boise, Idaho Territory
- In office July 11, 1881 – July 20, 1885
- Preceded by: Charles P. Bilderback
- Succeeded by: Sol Hasbrouck

Mayor of Boise, Idaho Territory (Boise, Idaho, after July 1890)
- In office July 15, 1889 – July 15, 1893
- Preceded by: Peter J. Pefley
- Succeeded by: Peter Sonna

Mayor of Boise, Idaho
- In office July 20, 1905 – April 6, 1907
- Preceded by: James H. Hawley
- Succeeded by: John M. Haines

Personal details
- Born: James Alonzo Pinney; September 29, 1835 Franklin County, Ohio
- Died: February 4, 1914 (aged 78) Boise, Idaho

James Alonzo Pinney (September 29, 1835 – February 4, 1914) served as mayor of Boise, Idaho Territory (later Boise, Idaho) in the late 19th century and early 20th century. He is the only person in the city's history to serve as mayor three nonconsecutive times and win election as mayor five times.

Pinney was Boise mayor when Idaho Territory became the U.S. state of Idaho in July 1890.

Pinney was passionate about the arts. In his lifetime he owned a bookstore and two theaters. His first theater, The Columbia Theater, was founded in 1882. When The Columbia was torn down in 1908, Pinney replaced it with a five-story theater dubbed The Pinney Theater.

Political offices
Preceded by Charles P. Bilderback	Mayor of Boise, Idaho Territory; 1881–1885	Succeeded by Sol Hasbrouck
Preceded by Peter J. Pefley	Mayor of Boise, Idaho Territory; 1889–1893	Succeeded by Peter Sonna
Preceded by James H. Hawley	Mayor of Boise, Idaho; 1905–1907	Succeeded by John M. Haines
