= Ernest G. Eagleson =

American politician

Mayor of Boise, Idaho
- In office April 28, 1919 – April 7, 1921
- Preceded by: S. H. Hays
- Succeeded by: Eugene B. Sherman

Mayor of Boise, Idaho
- In office May 5, 1925 – May 2, 1927
- Preceded by: Eugene B. Sherman
- Succeeded by: Herbert F. Lemp

Personal details
- Born: January 13, 1864 Cadiz, Ohio, United States
- Died: August 17, 1956 (aged 92) Boise, Idaho, United States

Ernest G. Eagleson (January 13, 1864 – August 17, 1956) was an American politician who served two nonconsecutive terms as mayor of Boise, Idaho, in the 1910s and 1920s.

Political offices
Preceded by S. H. Hays	Mayor of Boise, Idaho; 1919–1921	Succeeded by Eugene B. Sherman
Preceded by Eugene B. Sherman	Mayor of Boise, Idaho; 1925–1927	Succeeded by Herbert F. Lemp
