= Ephraim Smith =

American politician

Mayor of Boise, Idaho Territory
- In office 1866–1867
- Preceded by: (office created)
- Succeeded by: Henry E. Prickett

Personal details
- Born: April 13, 1819 Meadville, Pennsylvania
- Died: November 4, 1891 (aged 72) Toledo, Ohio

Ephraim Smith (April 13, 1819 – November 4, 1891) was a 19th-century American physician and businessman who served as the first mayor of Boise, Idaho Territory, in the mid 1860s. For years it was believed Smith's successor, Henry E. Prickett, was the city's first elected mayor until recent research proved otherwise. Smith is also believed to have been the first treasurer of Idaho Territory. In addition to his political career, Smith also operated a drug store and private hospital in Boise.

Smith was killed in 1891 after being run over by a streetcar in Toledo, Ohio. He is buried in Pioneer Cemetery in Boise.

Political offices
Preceded by office created	Mayor of Boise, Idaho Territory; 1866–1867	Succeeded by Henry E. Prickett
