= H. W. Whillock =

American politician (1904–1992)

Mayor of Boise, Idaho
- In office April 19, 1941 – May 11, 1942
- Preceded by: James L. Straight
- Succeeded by: Austin Walker

Mayor of Boise, Idaho
- In office February 25, 1946 – May 5, 1947
- Preceded by: Sam S. Griffin
- Succeeded by: Potter P. Howard

Personal details
- Born: February 9, 1904 Humansville, Missouri, United States
- Died: August 9, 1992 (aged 88) Boise, Idaho, United States

Henry Westerman Whillock (February 9, 1904 – August 9, 1992) was an American politician and television station general manager, who served on two occasions as mayor of Boise, Idaho, in the 1940s.

Whillock was the general manager of KBOI-Channel 2 in Boise, Idaho.

Whillock was first elected mayor in 1941. An officer in the United States Navy, he resigned in May 1942 after being called to active duty during World War II. Whillock returned to Boise at war's end.

Whillock became mayor again in 1946. He was appointed to finish the term of Sam S. Griffin, who resigned.

Political offices
Preceded by James L. Straight	Mayor of Boise, Idaho; 1941–1942	Succeeded by Austin Walker
Preceded by Sam S. Griffin	Mayor of Boise, Idaho; 1947–1951	Succeeded by Potter P. Howard
