= Eugene B. Sherman =

American politician

Mayor of Boise, Idaho
- In office April 7, 1921 – May 5, 1925
- Preceded by: Ernest G. Eagleson
- Succeeded by: Ernest G. Eagleson

Personal details
- Born: December 25, 1871 Clarksville, Iowa, United States
- Died: May 22, 1963 (aged 91) Alameda County, California, United States

Eugene Buren Sherman (December 25, 1871 – August 17, 1956) served two terms as mayor of Boise, Idaho, from 1921 to 1925.

== Sources ==
- Mayors of Boise - Past and Present
- Idaho State Historical Society Reference Series, Corrected List of Mayors, 1867-1996

Political offices
Preceded by Ernest G. Eagleson	Mayor of Boise, Idaho; 1921–1925	Succeeded by Ernest G. Eagleson
