= Jay S. Amyx =

American politician (1923–2014)

Mayor of Boise, Idaho
- In office January 1966 – January 1974
- Preceded by: Eugene W. Shellworth
- Succeeded by: Richard Eardley

Personal details
- Born: September 27, 1923 Decatur, Texas, US
- Died: January 24, 2014 (aged 90) Boise, Idaho, US
- Resting place: Terrace Lawn Gardens, Meridian, Idaho
- Profession: Builder, contractor, and land developer

Jay S. Amyx (September 27, 1923 – January 24, 2014) served two terms as mayor of Boise, Idaho, United States, from 1966 to 1974.

== Career ==
After graduating high school, Amyx enlisted in the United States Air Force and worked as an electrician before founding a construction company in Boise. In 1963, Amyx ran for mayor of Boise against the incumbent, Eugene Shellworth, but lost in the general election.

In November 1965, Amyx became the first Boise mayor elected to a four-year term, defeating incumbent Eugene Shellworth in a runoff. Previous mayoral elections in Boise had been held in April and for two-year terms. Amyx was re-elected in 1969. During his first term in office, Amyx dealt with multiple controversies, including an obscenity scandal relating to the 1968 film Candy and a protest of 200 women against sexist standards in the fashion industry. He chose not to run for re-election in 1974.

Amyx ran for the Republican nomination for governor in 1978, but finished last among a field of six in the primary election.

== Personal life ==
Amyx was born in Decatur, Texas on September 27, 1923. He was an ordained minister in the Baptist tradition. He was married and had five children. He died on January 24, 2014.

== Sources ==
- Mayors of Boise - Past and Present
- Idaho State Historical Society Reference Series, Corrected List of Mayors, 1867-1996

Political offices
Preceded by Eugene W. Shellworth	Mayor of Boise, Idaho; 1966–1974	Succeeded by Richard Eardley
