= Ellefsen =

Ellefsen is a surname. Notable people with the surname include:

- Gunnar Ellefsen (1930–1997), Norwegian politician for the Labour Party
- Håvard Ellefsen (born 1975), Norwegian electronic musician best known as Mortiis
- Harald Ellefsen (born 1950), Norwegian politician for the Conservative Party
- Henrik Ellefsen (born 1971), Norwegian businessman
- Pauli Ellefsen (1936–2012), Faroese politician and member of the Union Party
