= Henry E. Prickett =

American politician

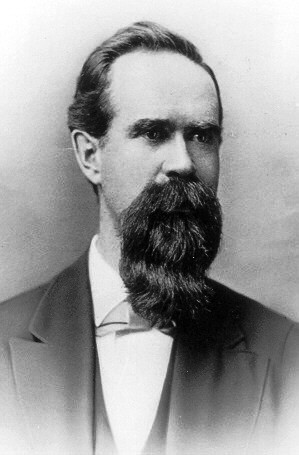

Associate Justice of the Idaho Territorial Supreme Court
- In office January 19, 1876 – April 1884
- Appointed by: Ulysses S. Grant; Rutherford B. Hayes
- Preceded by: W. C. Whitson
- Succeeded by: Case Broderick

Mayor of Boise, Idaho Territory
- In office November 19, 1867 – January 14, 1868
- Preceded by: Ephraim Smith
- Succeeded by: Thomas B. Hart

Member of the Wisconsin State Assembly
- In office 1858
- Constituency: Buffalo, Jackson, and Trempealeau counties

Personal details
- Born: September 1, 1829 Faversham, Kent, England, U.K.
- Died: June 14, 1885 (aged 55) Hailey, Idaho Territory, U.S.
- Party: Republican
- Spouse: Martha
- Children: 1
- Parent: Henry Prickett (father)
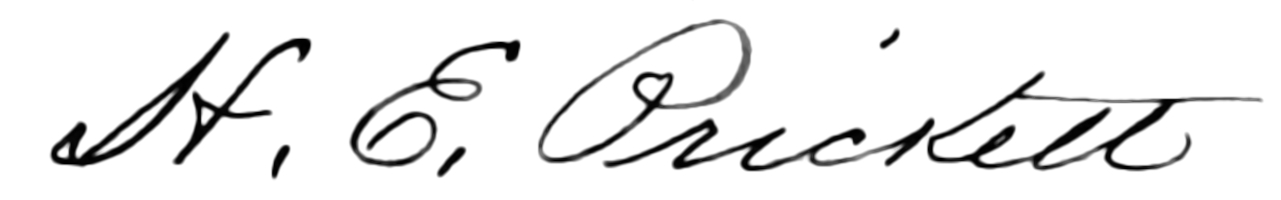
- Signature

Henry Elliott Prickett (September 1, 1829 – June 14, 1885) was an American politician and jurist who served as mayor of mayor of Boise, Idaho Territory from 1867 to 1868 and as Associate Justice of the Idaho Territorial Supreme Court from 1876 to 1884.

== Biography ==
Prickett was born on September 1, 1829, in Faversham, Kent, England, the son of Henry Prickett, and he came to the United States in 1836. His family settled first in Connecticut, then in Wisconsin, where he would study and practice law. He was elected to the Wisconsin State Assembly in 1858 to represent Buffalo, Jackson, and Trempealeau counties. He and his wife, Martha, had one daughter. He traveled West in 1860 to Colorado, and he reached Idaho City, Idaho, in 1864. He served the as the deputy clerk of one of the territory's district courts for the next three years, until he opened a law practice in Boise in 1867.

Prickett was declared mayor after the winner of the November 1867 mayoral election, L. B. Lindsay, was disqualified. A new mayoral election was held in January 1868, won by Thomas B. Hart. In 1871 Prickett ran for a full one-year term as Boise mayor as a Radical Republican. He was narrowly defeated by John Hailey, who never assumed the office.

On January 13, 1876, President Ulysses S. Grant nominated Prickett to be Associate Justice of the Idaho Territorial Supreme Court, and he was confirmed by the senate six days later. As his four-year term was expiring, President Rutherford B. Hayes renominated him for the same position on January 16, 1880, and he was confirmed by the senate five days later. Prickett's term expired in 1884, and Case Broderick was confirmed to succeed him, with Prickett serving through late April of 1884.

He died from heart disease in Hailey, Idaho, on June 14, 1885.

Political offices
Preceded by Ephraim Smith	Mayor of Boise, Idaho Territory; 1867–1868	Succeeded by Thomas B. Hart
