= J. L. Edlefsen =

American politician (1874–1948)

Mayor of Boise, Idaho
- In office November 11, 1936 – April 29, 1939
- Preceded by: Byron E. Hyatt
- Succeeded by: James L. Straight

Personal details
- Born: July 19, 1874 Ovid, Idaho Territory, United States
- Died: May 11, 1948 (aged 73) Boise, Idaho, United States

James Lauritz Edlefsen (July 19, 1874 – May 11, 1948) served as mayor of Boise, Idaho, from 1936 to 1939.

Edlefsen was appointed mayor after his predecessor, Byron E. Hyatt, died in office in November 1936. He was elected to a full two-year term in 1937.

== Sources ==
- Mayors of Boise - Past and Present
- Idaho State Historical Society Reference Series, Corrected List of Mayors, 1867-1996

Political offices
Preceded by Byron E. Hyatt	Mayor of Boise, Idaho; 1936–1939	Succeeded by James L. Straight
