= Cyrus Y. Jacobs =

American politician and merchant

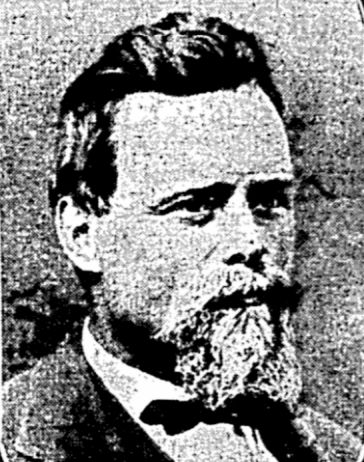
- Cyrus Y. Jacobs
- Born: December 23, 1831; Lancaster, Pennsylvania
- Died: June 28, 1900 (aged 68); Boise, Idaho
- Burial place: Pioneer Cemetery, Boise
- Other names: Cy Jacobs
- Occupation(s): Granary owner, distiller, mercantile owner
- Known for: Jacobs Best Rye Whiskey
- Office: Mayor, Boise City
- Term: 1879-1880
- Predecessor: Charles Himrod
- Successor: Charles P. Bilderback
- Spouse: Mary Ellen (Palmer) Jacobs
- Parents: James Jacobs (father); Margaret (Grow) Jacobs (mother)

Cyrus Y. Jacobs (December 23, 1831—June 28, 1900) was a grain mill owner, distiller, and merchant in Boise, Idaho. He served as mayor of Boise City 1879–1880.

== Early life and family ==
Jacobs was born in Lancaster, Pennsylvania, either December 22 or December 23, 1831, to parents James and Margaret (Grow) Jacobs, and he attended school in Lancaster. In 1849 the family moved to Iowa, then in 1852 they followed the Oregon Trail to Portland, Oregon, where Jacobs found employment as a store clerk.

In 1856 Cyrus Jacobs married Mary Ellen Palmer, daughter of Joel Palmer, and the couple produced six children.

== Career ==
In 1858 Jacobs moved to Walla Walla, Washington, where he and his brother, Richard, opened a mercantile business and sold supplies in regional mining camps. While headed along a miner's trail to Idaho City with a pack train in 1863, Jacobs followed Major Pinkney Lugenbeel and a company of soldiers en route to rebuild Fort Boise. He sold his supplies near the fort, and when the barracks had been established, Jacobs along with H.C. Riggs and Frank Davis platted the townsite of Boise City. Jacobs became the city's first merchant, and he employed Riggs as an agent for C. Jacobs & Co. In 1907 Mary Jacobs donated her husband's copy of the townsite map to the Idaho State Historical Society.

Cyrus Jacobs and Joel Palmer had formed a partnership with A.H. Robie to establish a steam sawmill under the name Bannock City Mill Company in Idaho City (formerly Bannock City), but in October, 1863, Jacobs and Palmer sold their interest in the firm to Robie and Charles S. Bush, who operated the mill under the name Robie & Bush.

In Boise City, Jacobs built a grain mill, a packing plant, and a distillery, and he operated a store at the corner of 7th and Main St., one of the first brick buildings in Boise. He served on the city council and was elected mayor for one term in 1879. An early variety of a town clock was operated at Jacobs' mill, with a steam whistle at 6:00am, 12:00pm, and 6:00pm.

In 1881 the Idaho Statesman reported that Jacobs had produced a version of cherry bounce that was "better than Jaynes' Elixir of Life and will cure a cold, the blues or anything else that goes wrong."

A proponent of electric streetcar service, Jacobs helped to establish the Boise Rapid Transit Company, and he converted his grain mill into a powerhouse for the company.

== Illness and death ==
Jacobs became ill in April, 1893, and he may have suffered a stroke. By August his store and inventory were sold, and his property was attached by creditors. In 1894 he was found incompetent to conduct his business affairs, and Mary Jacobs petitioned and was granted a court appointed guardian for her husband. By 1897 Jacobs was described as "in a state of complete mental collapse." He died June 28, 1900.

== See also ==
- Cyrus Jacobs House
