= J. J. McCue =

Mayor of Boise, Idaho from 1933 to 1935

Mayor of Boise, Idaho
- In office May 1, 1933 – May 1, 1935
- Preceded by: Ross Cady
- Succeeded by: Byron E. Hyatt

Personal details
- Born: May 14, 1875 Buffalo, New York, United States
- Died: June 2, 1935 (aged 60) Boise, Idaho, United States

John J. McCue (May 14, 1875 – June 2, 1935) served a single term as mayor of Boise, Idaho, from 1933 to 1935.

Political offices
Preceded by Ross Cady	Mayor of Boise, Idaho; 1933–1935	Succeeded by Byron E. Hyatt
