= Ontario station (Oregon) =

Former railway station in Ontario, Oregon, United States

Ontario, OR
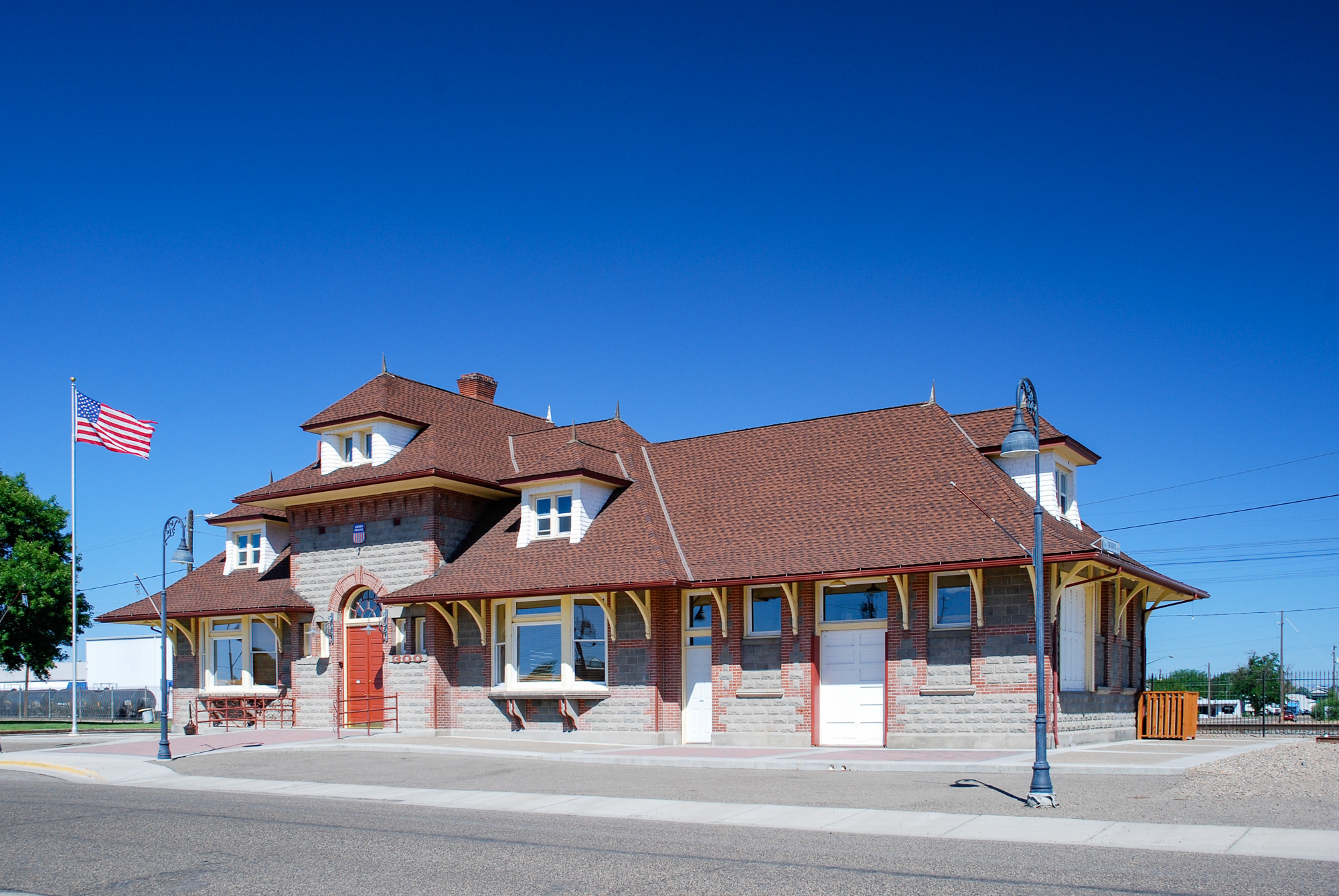
- Oregon Short Line Railroad Depot in 2010

General information
- Location: 300 Depot Lane; Ontario, Oregon 97914; United States
- System: Former Amtrak and Union Pacific Railroad inter-city rail station
- Owner: City of Ontario & Union Pacific Railroad
- Line: Union Pacific Railroad
- Platforms: 1 side platform
- Tracks: 3

Construction
- Structure type: At-grade
- Accessible: Yes

Other information
- Station code: ONT (Amtrak)

History
- Closed: May 10, 1997 (for passenger rail service)

Former services
Preceding station	Amtrak	Following station
Baker City toward Seattle	Pioneer	Nampa toward Chicago
Preceding station	Union Pacific Railroad	Following station
Payette toward Portland	Portland – Granger	Arcadia toward Granger
Cairo toward Burns	Burns – Ontario	Terminus
Cairo toward Brogan	Brogan – Ontario	Terminus
- Oregon Short Line Railroad Depot
- U.S. National Register of Historic Places
- Location: 300 Depot Lane; Ontario, Oregon
- Coordinates: 44°1′25.2″N 116°57′44.2″W
- Built: 1906–1907
- Architectural style: Richardsonian Romanesque, Queen Anne
- NRHP reference No.: 99000950
- Added to NRHP: August 5, 1999
Location

The Ontario station is a former train station located in Ontario, Oregon, United States that is listed on the National Register of Historic Places as the Oregon Short Line Railroad Depot. It was constructed in 1907 by the Union Pacific Railroad (UP) for its subsidiary, the Oregon Short Line Railroad (OSL), to replace an 1885 OSL depot that had been located just to the south and had been a simple wood-frame structure. The building is made of concrete block cast to imitate stone, and with red brick trim and other ornamental features. The City of Ontario purchased the building from UP in 1996, but as of 1999 the land remained owned by UP and was being leased to the city. The station was added to the NRHP in 1999.

During the station's active years, campaigning politicians sometimes made whistle-stops at the station to give speeches, among them being Harry Truman and Richard Nixon. Senator Robert F. Kennedy passed through just four days before his death.

Amtrak (the National Railroad Passenger Corporation) began service to the station in 1977 with the Pioneer, which originally provided service between Salt Lake City, Utah and Seattle, Washington, but was eventually extended further east and provided daily service from Chicago, Illinois to Seattle. The next eastbound stop on the Pioneer was in Nampa, Idaho and the next westbound station was in Baker City, Oregon.

== See also ==
- National Register of Historic Places listings in Malheur County, Oregon
