= Rattlesnake National Recreation Area =

Protected area in Montana, United States

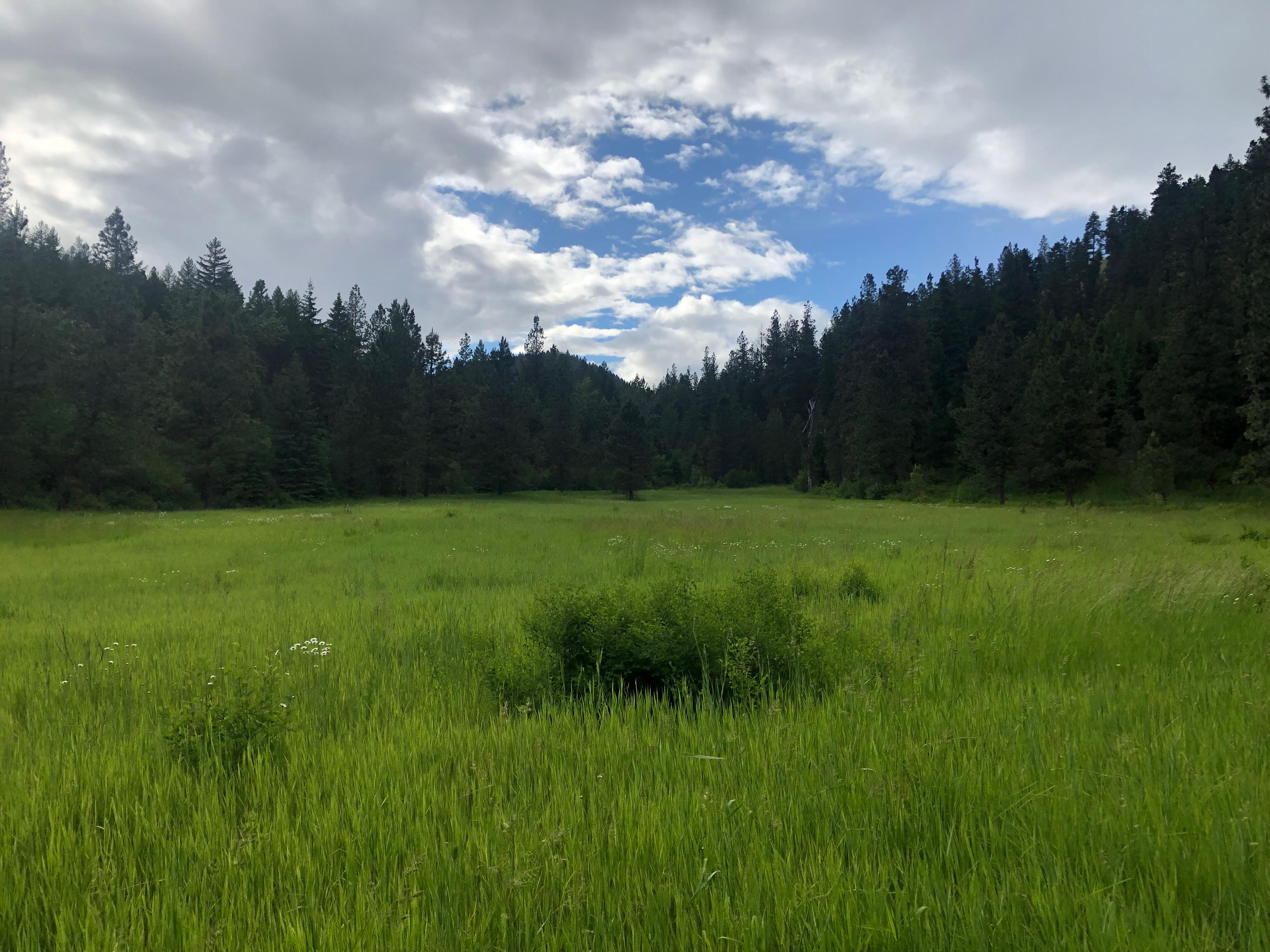

- Location within the United States
- Location: Missoula County, Montana, United States
- Nearest city: Missoula, Montana
- Coordinates: 46°57′N 113°55′W
- Area: 28,000 acres (11,000 ha)
- Established: October 19, 1980
- Governing body: United States Forest Service
- Website: Rattlesnake National Recreation Area

Rattlesnake National Recreation Area is a United States national recreation area located 4 miles (6.4 kilometers) north of Missoula, Montana in the Rattlesnake Creek drainage area. It is administered by the Lolo National Forest and is adjacent to the Rattlesnake Wilderness. Both the recreation area and the wilderness area were established by the U.S. Congress on October 19, 1980.

There are more than 73 miles of hiking trails in the recreation area many of which are also open to horseback riders, mountain bikers, and cross-country skiers.

== Biology and ecology ==
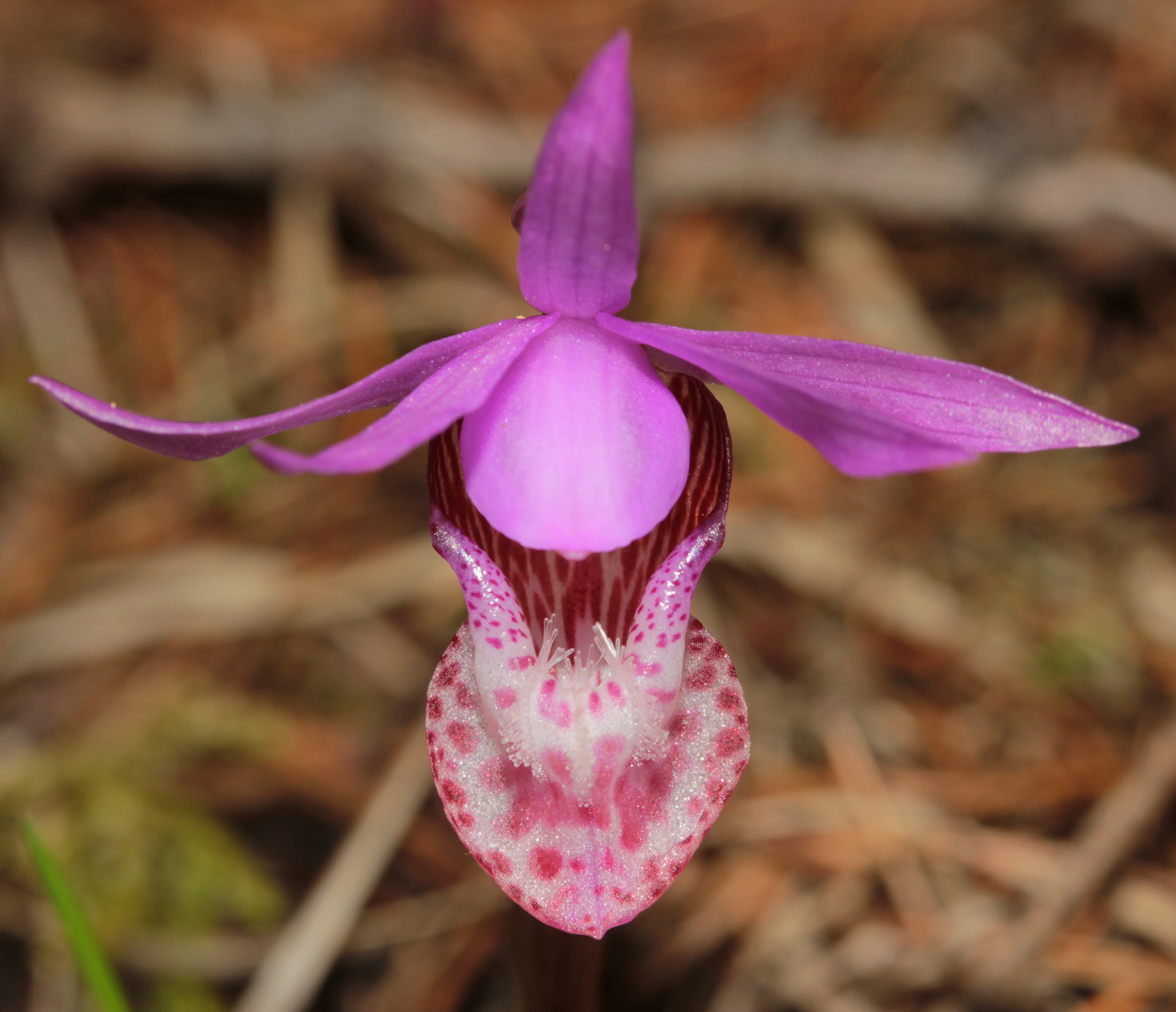
A Calypso orchid

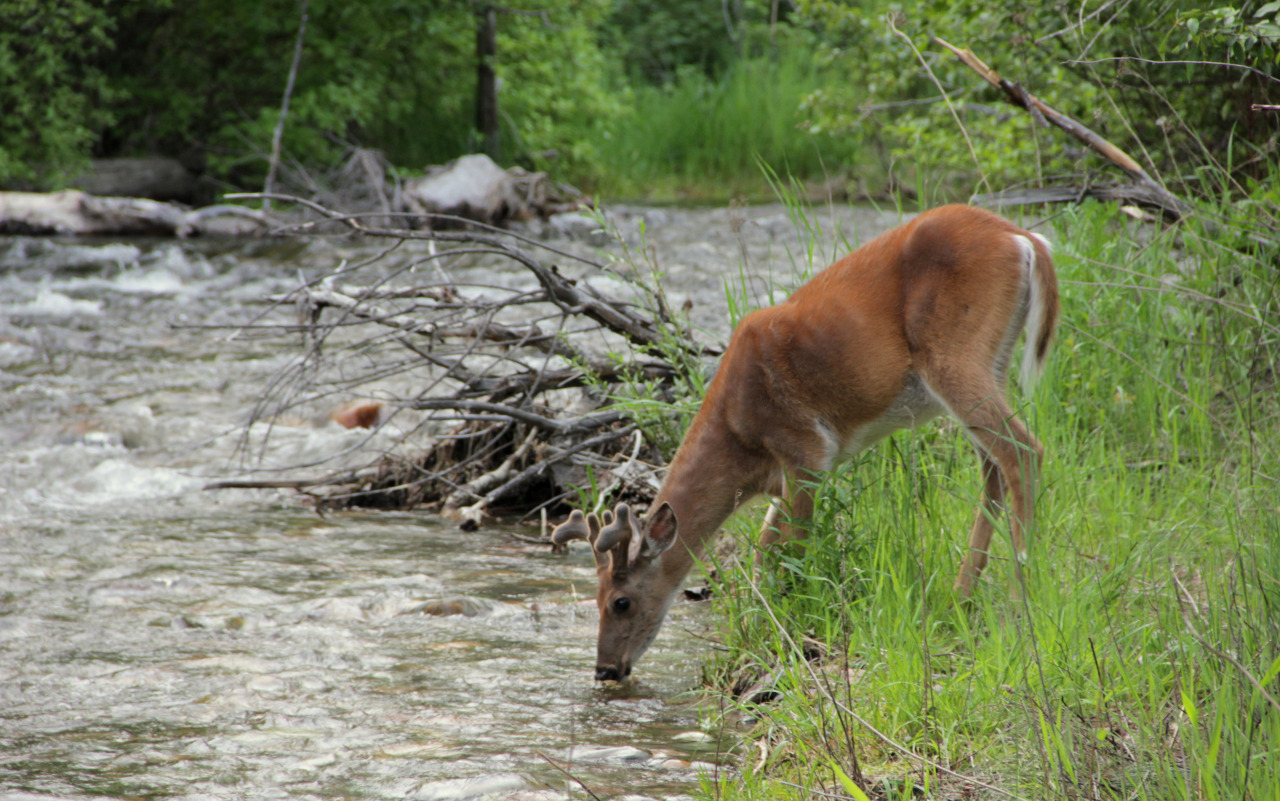
A white-tailed deer drinks from Rattlesnake Creek

=== Flora ===
Though host to invasive plant species including leafy spurge, the Rattlesnake contains native plant communities such as Sphagnum riparium at Shoo Fly Meadows, one of the only Sphagnum bogs in the Western United States. Native orchid species may be found in the recreation area, including Calypso bulbosa, Cypripedium montanum, and Corallorhiza striata.

=== Fauna ===
Popular with fishermen, Rattlesnake Creek hosts bull trout, cutthroat trout, and mountain whitefish. Along the trail, green comma and western tiger swallowtail butterflies may be found, amongst others. Mammals which frequent the National Recreation Area include elk, white-tailed deer, mountain goat, and grizzly bear. Birdwatchers visiting the Rattlesnake may find over forty bird species including pileated woodpecker, great grey owl, ruffed grouse, and American dipper. Visitors should exercise caution, for black bear and mountain lion frequent the area.
