= Fleming Amyx =

19th century American politician

Fleming Amyx was an American politician. He was a member of the California State Assembly for Tuolumne County from 1855 to 1856, and from 1861 to 1862. In 1861, he voted against a state resolution for California to stay in the Union (which passed the assembly).

Amyx married Augusta Amelia de Lolme, a native of Geneva, Switzerland, on July 12, 1855, in Benicia, California.
