= Herbert F. Lemp =

American politician

Mayor of Boise, Idaho
- In office May 2, 1927 – May 6, 1927
- Preceded by: Ernest G. Eagleson
- Succeeded by: Walter F. Hansen

Personal details
- Born: Herbert Frederick Lemp; June 24, 1884 Boise, Idaho Territory, United States
- Died: May 6, 1927 (aged 42) Boise, Idaho, United States

Herbert Frederick Lemp (June 24, 1884 – May 6, 1927) served briefly as mayor of Boise, Idaho, before his death in May 1927.

Lemp was elected mayor in April 1927 but was seriously injured in a polo accident shortly thereafter. Lemp was sworn in as mayor in the hospital but succumbed to his injuries four days later. His term was completed by Walter F. Hansen.

== Sources ==
- Mayors of Boise - Past and Present
- Idaho State Historical Society Reference Series, Corrected List of Mayors, 1867-1996

Political offices
Preceded by Ernest G. Eagleson	Mayor of Boise, Idaho; 1927	Succeeded by Walter F. Hansen
