= Montana Snowbowl =

Ski area in Montana, United States

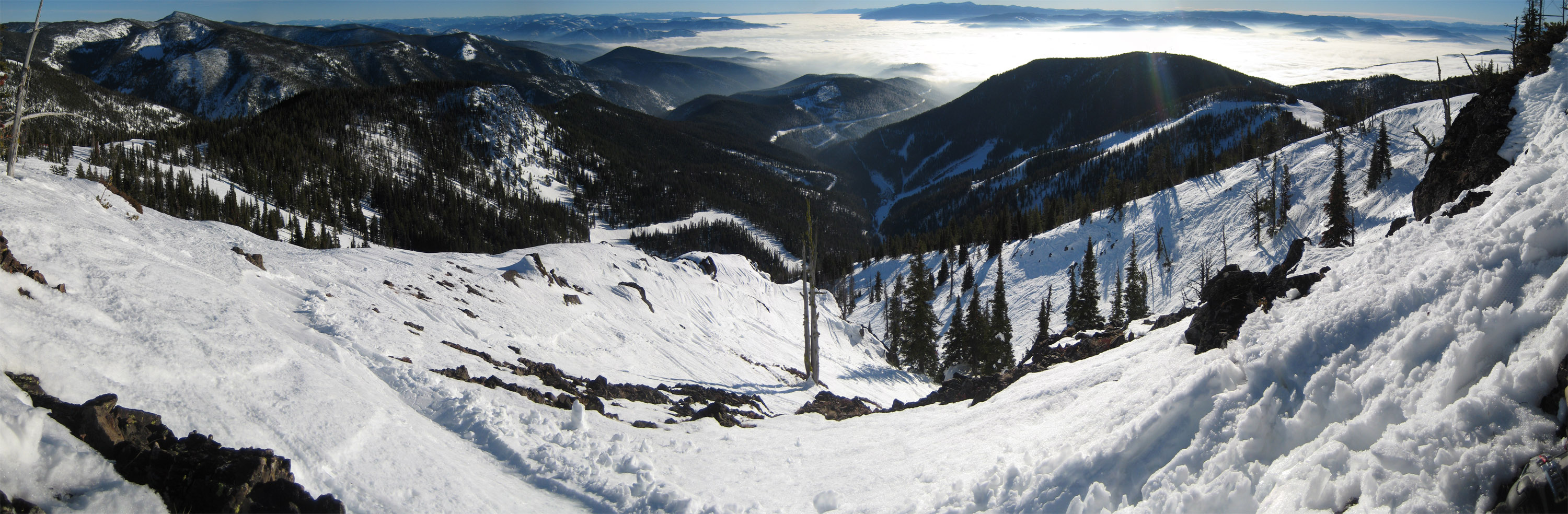

- Location within Montana Location within the United States
- Location: Missoula County, Montana
- Nearest city: Missoula
- Coordinates: 47.02°N 114.0°W
- Vertical: 2,600 ft (790 m)
- Top elevation: 7,600 ft (2,315 m)
- Base elevation: 5,000 ft (1,525 m)
- Skiable area: 950 acres (3.8 km^{2}), lift served, skiable
- Trails: 39
- Longest run: 3 miles (5 km)
- Lift system: 3 double chairs 1 T-bar, 1 rope tow
- Snowfall: 300 inches (760 cm)
- Website: montanasnowbowl.com

Montana Snowbowl is an alpine ski area in the western United States, located on the Lolo National Forest of western Montana, twelve miles (20 km) northwest of Missoula. It is known for long expert runs such as West Bowl and its throwback operations; there is no significant base development; the access road is significantly improved as of 2011, but still unpaved. Its lift system includes four chairlifts; three vintage Riblet doubles, and one Skytrac triple chair; and two surface lifts, a vintage Doppelmayr T-Bar, and a beginner rope tow.

Montana Snowbowl is also known for its steep runs and a 2,600-foot (790 m) vertical rise. The Grizzly Chair ascends 2,000 feet (610 m) from the base area and the midmountain LaValle Creek Chair tops out at 7,600 feet (2,315 m), below Point Six summit. When the resort first opened in December 1962, it was promoted as having the most vertical in the Pacific Northwest.

== Geography ==
Montana Snowbowl's base is centered on Butler Creek, a tributary of the Clark Fork River west of Missoula. The west side of the Butler Creek valley includes Television (TV) Mountain, topping out at 6,817 feet (2,078 m). To the west of TV Mountain runs La Valle Creek, which is also tributary to the Clark Fork River.

Access to the Montana Snowbowl begins at exit 101 of Interstate 90 on Grant Creek Road which parallels Grant Creek, one valley to the east from Butler Creek. Grant Creek's source is on the west flank of Murphy Peak (which is just north of Point Six Peak).

== Park expansion ==
In the spring of 2011, the area and the Lolo National Forest released plans to greatly expand the area by adding several chairlifts, more parking, and a new mountain restaurant. Part of the expansion would have included TV Mountain, home to the original Snow Park ski area, but this was later abandoned. The Snow Park expansion opened in January 2020.

The ski area often opens with weekend skiing in early December, with weekday lift operations beginning in mid-December and extending into the new year. From late June to early September the area operates one lift on the weekends for hikers and downhill mountain bikers.
