= Eugene W. Shellworth =

American politician (1912 – 1997)

Mayor of Boise, Idaho
- In office May 1961 – January 1966
- Preceded by: Robert L. Day
- Succeeded by: Jay S. Amyx

Personal details
- Born: April 2, 1912 Idaho, US
- Died: July 2, 1997 (aged 85) Boise, Idaho, US
- Education: U.S. Naval Academy, 1935

Eugene Whitney Shellworth (April 2, 1912 – July 2, 1997) was the mayor of Boise, Idaho, from 1961 to 1966. Elected in May 1961 and re-elected in November 1963, he lost a runoff election to Jay Amyx in late 1965, and then worked in banking; he had previous business experience in lumber and heavy equipment sales.

Shellworth was a 1935 graduate of the U.S. Naval Academy in Annapolis, Maryland. He played on the football team until a knee injury ended his playing career in his sophomore year. Shellworth served in the U.S. Navy during World War II.

== Personal ==
Shellworth married Martha Buckley of Tacoma, Washington in 1937, and they settled in Boise following the war. Their daughter Sandy is a former World Cup alpine ski racer and a 1968 Olympian.

His father, Harry Shellworth, was a page during the first state legislature following statehood in 1890, and later worked in the forest products industry.

Political offices
Preceded by Robert L. Day	Mayor of Boise, Idaho; 1966–1974	Succeeded by Jay S. Amyx
