= The Record-Courier (Baker City) =

The (Baker City) Record-Courier
- Type: Weekly newspaper
- Founder: Willard D. Nelson
- Founded: 1903 (as Haines Record)
- Ceased publication: 2016
- Language: English
- Headquarters: 1718 Main St., Baker City, OR 97814
- ISSN: 2833-2547
- OCLC number: 37278321
- Website: therconline.com

The Record-Courier was an independent weekly paper published in Baker City, from 1903 to 2016. It was a competitor of the tri-weekly Baker City Herald, publishing on Thursdays with a circulation of 2,470.

== History ==
In October 1903, Willard D. Nelson founded the Haines Record in Haines, Oregon. In December 1905, the first edition of the North Powder News was published in the North Powder, Oregon, by the New Publishing Company. In July 1906, the paper briefly suspended. In September 1906, Miss F. Ida Roberts acquired the News. In October 1909, Roberts sold the News to Glen H. Saling. The paper ceased at some point. In September 1911, W.A. Maxwell bought the plant and relaunched the News.

In July 1912, W.A. Maxwell leased the News to Miss Mary A., Law, who a year later married Cyrup R. Tibbetts. She continued to edit for the paper for at least a year. Around 1915, L.S. Cool succeeded her as editor. The News was acquired from Cool by Mrs. Clara Winters Ross in April 1917, followed by Calvin Goss, of the Cove Sentinel, in September 1918. Goss retired in April 1919. At that time he suspended the Sentinel. The News had been leased six months earlier. E.O. Wooley became News editor at some point.

In May 1920, E.O. Wooley and his wife resumed control of the North Powder News. In May 1921, Wooley sold the News to Lawrence J. Graffe and Bryan L. Losey from Nebraska. That July, the Wooley couple bought the Record from Nelson who published it for 18 years. In November 1923, a fire destroyed Wooley's printing plan in Haines. At that time Record was then printing by the Baker City Herald. In January 1925, Wooley sold the Record to Mrs. C. Hancock. In June 1925, Wooley reacquired the News from Graffe. In January 1928, Wooley's wife died. In August 1928, Charles M. Brinton acquired the Record from Hancock and the News from Wooley. In March 1930, Wooley was found dead in bed at a hotel in The Dalles, Oregon.

In July 1930, the Huntington Courier was founded in Huntington, Oregon, by Hans Grythdahl. The Courier eventually ceased. In June 1931, Brinton relaunched the Courier. George Jett was editor and it was printed in North Powder. A month later, Courier business manager Leroy Johnson was arrested for embezzlement, allegedly stealing $317.95 from the business. Police released Johnson from jail after four days and dropped the charges do to lack of evidence. Johnson then sued Brinton, seeking $7,500 in damages for filing the charges and writing about the arrest in his two papers. In November 1931, a trial was held, and a jury ruled in favor of Brinton.

In September 1934, Brinton moved his plant from North Powder to Baker City, and soon the Record and Courier were merged to form The Record-Courier. The News ceased at some point. In April 1959, Brinton died at age 78. He had retired two years earlier after growing ill. His son Byron "By" Brinton succeeded him as publisher, and operated the paper until selling it to his son Byron Dorsey "RonD" Brinton in 2004, and died in March 2005, at age 93. "RonD" Brinton died in May 2006, at age 59. His brother Greg Brinton owned the paper until January 2014, when he sold it to husband-and-wife Lynn and Gina Perkins. The final issue was printed on June 30, 2016.

In July 2016, The Record-Courier announced through a post on its Facebook page that it would be closing. The post read: "Because of health reasons, the Record-Courier is closed and won't be printing any further editions until further notice. I apologize for the inconvenience and thank you for your kindness and support."
