= List of mayors of Boise, Idaho =

Mayor of Boise, Idaho
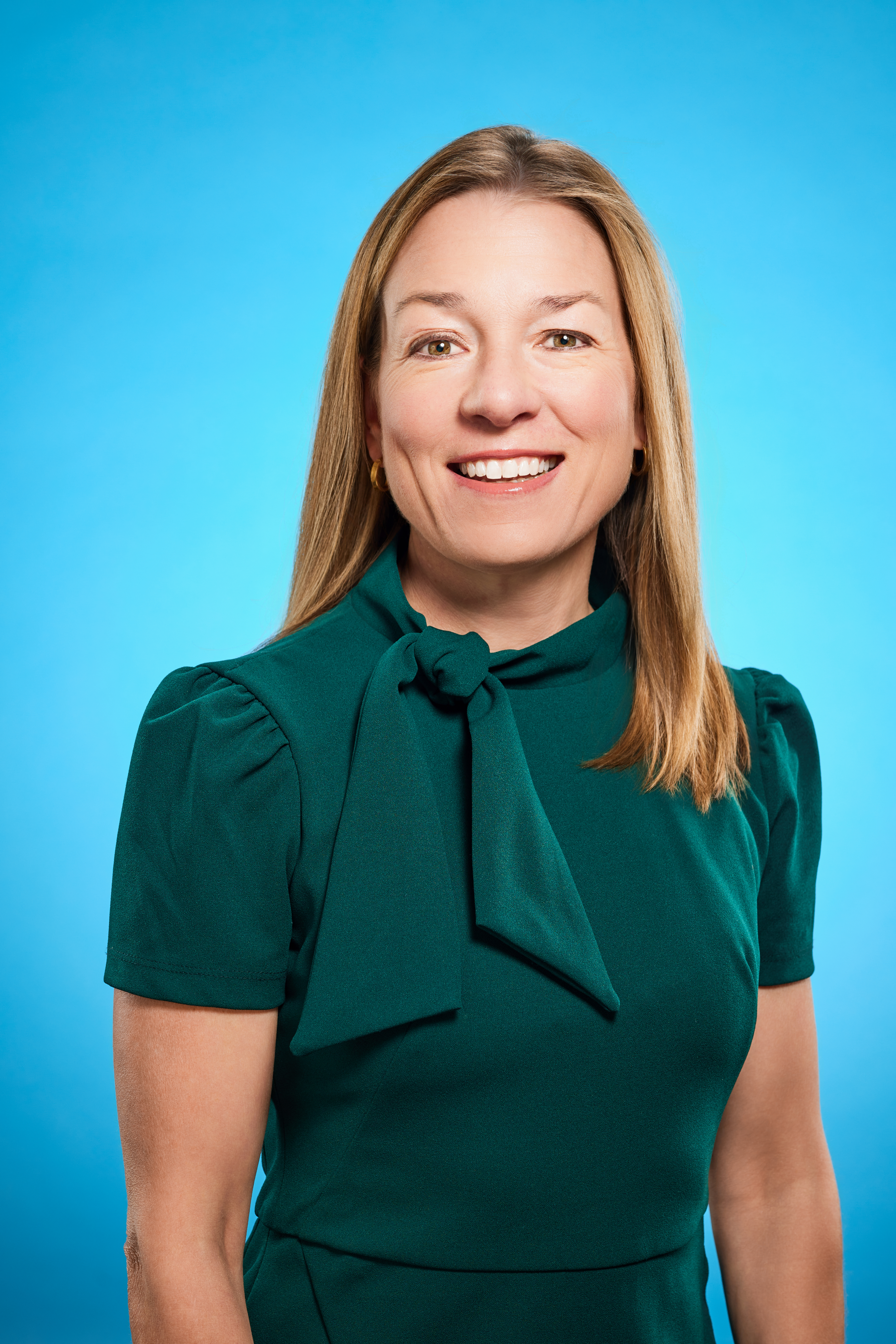
- Incumbent; Lauren McLean since January 7, 2020
- Term length: 4 years
- Inaugural holder: Ephraim Smith
- Formation: 1866
- Website: Mayor's Office

This is a list of mayors of Boise, Idaho.

Boise mayors were originally elected to one-year terms. The terms were extended to two years in 1881 and to four years in 1965.

Lauren McLean, the incumbent, was elected in 2019. The most recent Boise mayoral election occurred in November 2023.

#	Portrait	Name	Term start	Term end	Party	Note
1		Ephraim Smith (1819–1891; aged 72)	1866	1867		
2		Henry E. Prickett (1829–1885; aged 55–56)	November 19, 1867	January 1868	Republican	Appointed
3		Thomas B. Hart (1831–1911; aged 79–80)	January 1868	January 1869		Elected
4		Charles Himrod (1st) (1842–1920; aged 77)	January 1869	July 1872	Democratic	Appointed
5		George H. Twitchell	July 8, 1872	July 1873		
6		Thomas E. Logan (1st) (1834–1894; aged 59–60)	July 1873	July 1875		
7		John Lemp (1838–1912; aged 74)	July 1875	July 1876	Republican	
8		Thomas E. Logan (2nd)	July 1876	July 1878		
9		Charles Himrod (2nd)	July 1878	July 1879	Democratic	
10		Cyrus Y. Jacobs (1831–1900; aged 68)	July 1879	July 1880		
11		Charles P. Bilderback (1846–1917; aged 71)	July 1880	July 1881		
12		James A. Pinney (1st) (1835–1914; aged 78)	July 1881	July 1885	Republican	
13		Sol Hasbrouck (1833–1906; aged 73)	July 1885	November 5, 1885	Republican	Resigned
14		James W. Huston	December 28, 1885	July 1887	Republican	Appointed
15		Peter J. Pefley (1830–1906; aged 75)	July 1887	July 1889	Democratic	
16		James A. Pinney (2nd)	July 1889	July 1893	Republican	
17		Peter Sonna (1835–1907; aged 71)	July 1893	July 1895		
18		Walter E. Pierce (1860–1951; aged 91)	July 1895	July 1897	Democratic	
19		Moses Alexander (1st) (1853–1932; aged 78)	July 1897	July 1899	Democratic	
20		James H. Richards	July 1899	July 1901		
21		Moses Alexander (2nd)	July 1901	July 1903	Democratic	
22		James H. Hawley (1847–1929; aged 82)	July 1903	July 1905	Democratic	
23		James A. Pinney (3rd)	July 1905	April 1907	Republican	
24		John M. Haines (1863–1917; aged 54)	April 1907	April 1909	Republican	
25		Joseph T. Pence (1869–1941; aged 71)	April 1909	April 1911	Democratic	
26		Harry Fritchman (1865–1942; aged 77)	April 1911	May 25, 1912	Republican	Resigned
27		Arthur Hodges (1865–1944; aged 79)	May 25, 1912	April 1915	Republican	Appointed, Elected
28		J. W. Robinson (1860–1939; aged 78)	April 1915	June 1, 1916		Recalled
29		S. H. Hays (1864–1934; aged 70)	June 6, 1916	April 1919	Democratic	Appointed, Elected
30		Ernest G. Eagleson (1st) (1864–1956; aged 92)	April 1919	April 1921	Republican	
31		Eugene B. Sherman (1871–1963; aged 91)	April 1921	May 1925		
32		Ernest G. Eagleson (2nd)	May 1925	May 1927	Republican	
33		Herbert F. Lemp (1884–1927; aged 42)	May 1927	May 6, 1927		Died in office
34		Walter F. Hansen (1877–1965; aged 88)	May 6, 1927	April 1929		
35		James P. Pope (1884–1966; aged 81)	April 1929	February 13, 1933	Democratic	
36		Ross Cady (1884–1959; aged 74)	February 13, 1933	May 1933		Appointed
37		J. J. McCue (1875–1935; aged 60)	May 1933	May 1935		
38		Byron E. Hyatt (1873–1936; aged 63)	May 1935	November 11, 1936		Died in office
39		J. L. Edlefsen (1874–1948; aged 73)	November 1936	April 1939		
40		James L. Straight (1909–1981; aged 72)	April 1939	April 1941		
41		H. W. Whillock (1st) (1904–1992; aged 88)	April 1941	May 11, 1942		Resigned
42		Austin Walker (1883–1945; aged 62)	May 1942	October 31, 1945		Died in office
43		Sam S. Griffin (1892–1951; aged 59)	October 1945	February 25, 1946		Resigned
44		H. W. Whillock (2nd)	February 25, 1946	May 1947		
45		Potter P. Howard (1890–1956; aged 66)	May 1947	May 1951		
46		R. E. Edlefsen (1906–1986; aged 80)	May 1951	May 1959		
47		Robert L. Day (1920–1999; aged 79)	May 1959	May 1961		
48		Eugene W. Shellworth (1912–1997; aged 85)	May 1961	December 1965		
49		Jay S. Amyx (1923–2014; aged 90)	January 1966	January 1974	Republican	
50		Dick Eardley (1928–2012; aged 83)	January 1974	January 1986		
51		Dirk Kempthorne (1951–2026; aged 74)	January 1986	January 5, 1993	Republican	Resigned to become U.S. Senator
52		H. Brent Coles (born in 1951; age 74–75)	January 5, 1993	February 15, 2003	Republican	Resigned
53		Jerome Mapp (born in 1947; age 78–79)	February 15, 2003	February 18, 2003		(acting until appointment)
54		Carolyn Terteling-Payne (born in 1937; age 88)	February 18, 2003	January 2004	Republican	Appointed, did not run
55		Dave Bieter (born in 1959; age 66)	January 2004	January 2020	Democratic	
56		Lauren McLean (born in 1974; age 51)	January 2020	(Incumbent)	Democratic	

== Passages ==
Incumbent	Reason for Vacancy	Appointed Successor	Date of Appointment	Elected Successor	Date of Election
L. B. Lindsay	Disqualified, never took office (Note: John Hailey was the winner of the 1871 Boise mayoral election but never took office. According to city records Himrod served the term instead.)	Henry E. Prickett	November 19, 1867	Thomas B. Hart	January 1868
John Hailey	Never took office	Charles Himrod	July 10, 1871	George H. Twitchell	July 8, 1872
Sol Hasbrouck	Resigned November 5, 1885	James W. Huston	December 28, 1885	Peter J. Pefley	July 1887
Harry Fritchman	Resigned May 25, 1912	Arthur Hodges	May 25, 1912	Arthur Hodges	April 1, 1913
J. W. Robinson	Recalled June 1, 1916	S. H. Hays	June 6, 1916	S. H. Hays	April 1917
Herbert F. Lemp	Died May 6, 1927	Walter F. Hansen	May 6, 1927	James P. Pope	April 1929
James P. Pope	Resigned February 13, 1933	Ross Cady	February 13, 1933	J. J. McCue	April 1933
Byron E. Hyatt	Died November 11, 1936	J. L. Edlefsen	November 11, 1936	J. L. Edlefsen	April 1937
H. W. Whillock	Resigned May 11, 1942	Austin Walker	May 11, 1942	Austin Walker	April 1943
Austin Walker; Sam S. Griffin	Died October 31, 1945; Resigned February 25, 1946	Sam S. Griffin; H. W. Whillock	October 31, 1945; February 25, 1946	Potter P. Howard	April 1947
Dirk Kempthorne	Resigned January 5, 1993	H. Brent Coles	January 5, 1993	H. Brent Coles	November 1993
H. Brent Coles	Resigned February 15, 2003	Carolyn Terteling-Payne	February 18, 2003	Dave Bieter	November 2003
