= 1956 United States Senate election in Idaho =

- November 6, 1956
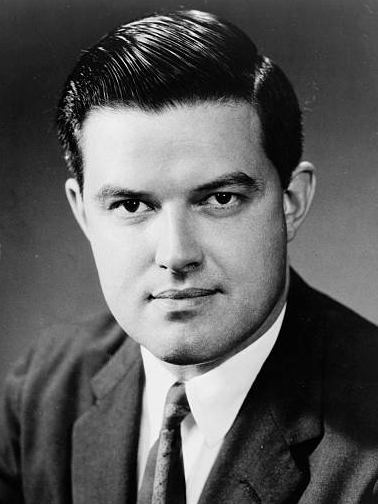

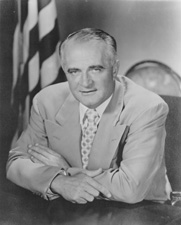

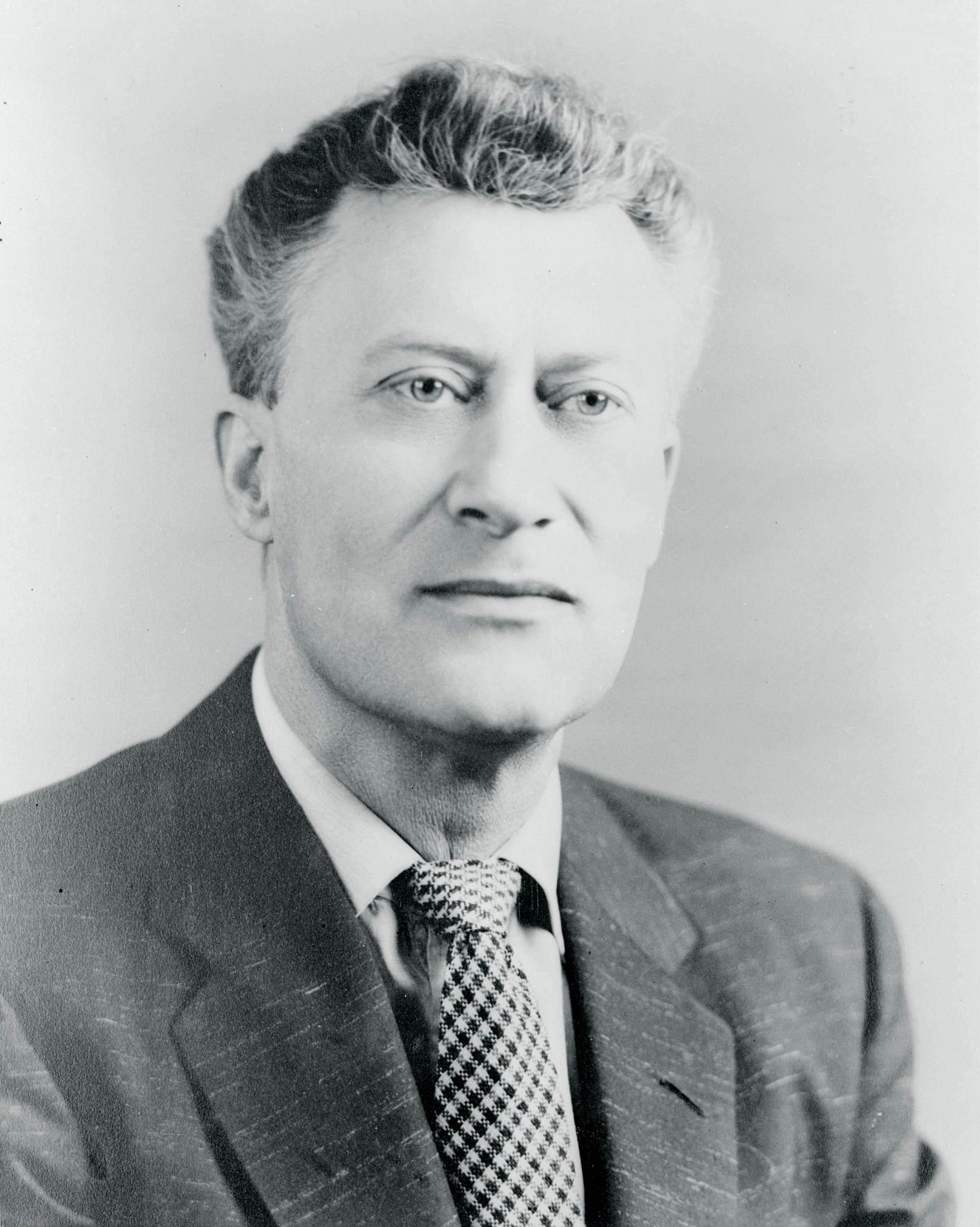
Nominee	Frank Church	Herman Welker	Glen H. Taylor (Write-in)
Party	Democratic	Republican	Independent
Popular vote	149,096	102,781	13,415
Percentage	56.20%	38.74%	5.06%
- County results Church: 40–50% 50–60% 60–70% 70–80% Welker: 40–50% 50–60%
U.S. senator before election
Herman Welker
Republican
Elected U.S. Senator
Frank Church
Democratic

The 1956 United States Senate election in Idaho took place on November 6, 1956. Incumbent Republican Senator Herman Welker was defeated for re-election by Democratic nominee Frank Church.

== Primary elections ==
Primary elections were held on August 14, 1956.

=== Democratic primary ===
==== Candidates ====
- Frank Church, attorney, chairman of the Young Democrats of Idaho and unsuccessful candidate for a seat in the state legislature
- Glen H. Taylor, former U.S. Senator and former Progressive Vice Presidential candidate
- Claude J. Burtenshaw, teacher, Democratic candidate for U.S. Senate in 1950 special election and unsuccessful candidate for Democratic nomination for U.S. Senate in 1954
- Alvin McCormack, farmer, unsuccessful candidate for Democratic nomination for U.S. Senate in 1954

The primary race was described as "the most colorful primary in the history of the state". Taylor was the last to enter the race and although he had a certain amount of popular support, he was unpopular with Democratic office holders because of his left wing beliefs and idiosyncratic style.

Taylor contested the close defeat, claiming irregularities but the State Board of Canvassers confirmed Church's narrow victory over Taylor on August 25.

==== Results ====
Democratic primary results
Party	Candidate	Votes	%
Democratic	Frank Church	27,942	37.75
Democratic	Glen H. Taylor	27,742	37.48
Democratic	Claude J. Burtenshaw	11,738	15.86
Democratic	Alvin McCormack	6,596	8.91
Total votes		74,018	

=== Republican primary ===
==== Candidates ====
- Herman Welker, incumbent U.S. Senator
- William S. Holden, attorney
- Ray J. Davis, teacher
- John C. Sanborn, former U.S. Representative
- Mark L. Streeter, farmer

==== Results ====
Republican primary results
Party	Candidate	Votes	%
Republican	Herman Welker (incumbent)	31,399	42.51
Republican	William S. Holden	21,081	28.54
Republican	Ray J. Davis	12,349	16.72
Republican	John C. Sanborn	8,261	11.18
Republican	Mark Streeter	774	1.05
Total votes		73,864	

== General election ==
=== Campaign ===
Church's campaign contrasted his fitness with that of Welker. His slogan, "Idaho Will Be Proud of Frank Church", was a major asset to his campaign. Church also campaigned on an internationalist plank, in favor of a publicly owned Hells Canyon Dam and was conservative on money matters.

Welker's campaign focused heavily on anti-Communism, a decision that proved to be a weak political foundation. The Welker campaign also ran on his record, as well as the "Herman letter", in which President Eisenhower endorsed Welker's candidacy, although he pointedly refused to campaign in person for Welker.

One of the issues was whether the proposed Hells Canyon Dam would be a single "high dam" (which would have been publicly built and owned) or a private three dam project. Welker wanted a private dam with one of Church's aides saying "The campaign was Frank Church against Idaho Power. They fought him tooth and nail." Church was for a high dam, although the Western Political Quarterly described his support for the high dam as "mild", Lyndon Johnson's biographer Robert Caro says that this was the central issue in this election and the Governor's election in the same year, and noted that Church's maiden speech was on the dam.

Taylor decided to run as a write-in candidate and labelled Church a candidate of "corporate interests".

1956 should have been a good year for a Republican candidate with Eisenhower winning a plurality of 61,111 in Idaho.

The defeat increased Democratic control of the Senate and led to much anger within the Republican Party, with Joseph McCarthy even accusing President Dwight Eisenhower of not supporting Welker's reelection campaign enough.

=== Endorsements ===
Frank Church (D)

Federal officials

- Estes Kefauver, United States Senator from Tennessee, Democratic candidate for Vice President

=== Results ===
1956 United States Senate election in Idaho
Party	Candidate	Votes	%
Democratic	Frank Church	149,096	56.20
Republican	Herman Welker (Incumbent)	102,781	38.74
Write-in	Glen H. Taylor	13,415	5.06
Majority		46,315	17.46
Turnout		265,292	
Democratic gain from Republican			

== See also ==
- 1956 United States Senate elections

== Bibliography ==
- Congressional Elections, 1946-1996. Washington, D.C.: Congressional Quarterly Inc. 1998. ISBN 1-56802-248-4.
