= 1962 United States Senate election in Idaho =

- November 6, 1962
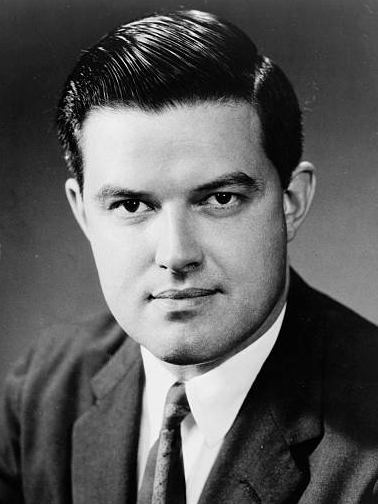

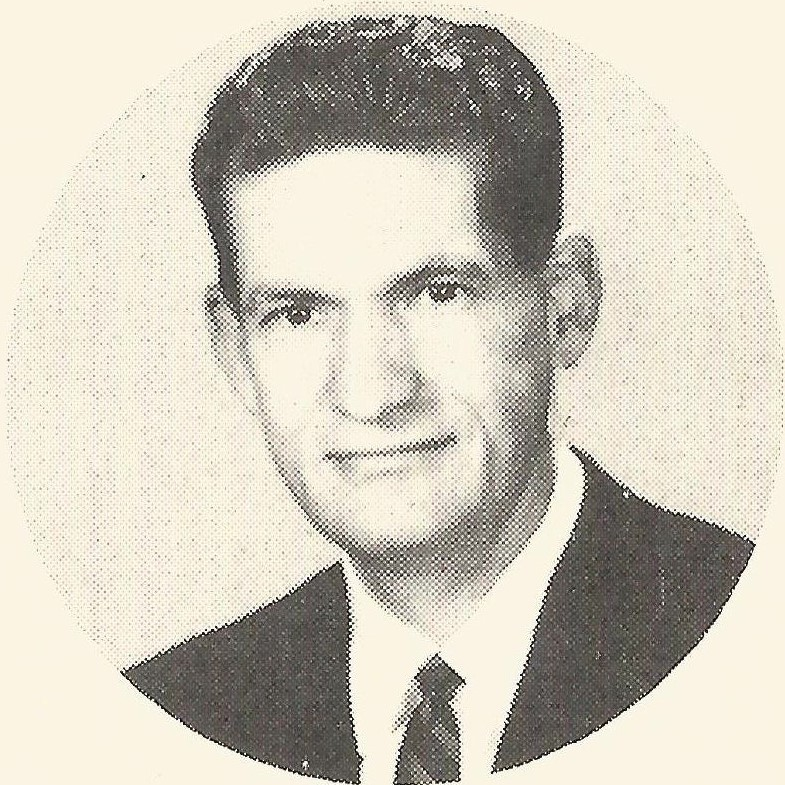
Nominee	Frank Church	Jack Hawley
Party	Democratic	Republican
Popular vote	141,657	117,129
Percentage	54.74%	45.26%
- County results Church: 50–60% 60–70% 70–80% Hawley: 50–60% Tie: 50%
U.S. senator before election
Frank Church
Democratic
Elected U.S. Senator
Frank Church
Democratic

The 1962 United States Senate election in Idaho took place on November 6, 1962. Incumbent Democratic Senator Frank Church won re-election to a second term. This election was the first time that an incumbent Democratic senator from Idaho was re-elected.

== Primary elections ==
Primary elections were held on June 6, 1962.

=== Democratic primary ===
==== Candidates ====
- Frank Church, incumbent U.S. senator

==== Results ====
Democratic primary results
Party	Candidate	Votes	%
Democratic	Frank Church (incumbent)	Unopposed	

=== Republican primary ===
==== Candidates ====
- George V. Hansen, city commissioner of Pocatello, former mayor of Alameda
- Jack Hawley, former member of the Idaho House of Representatives

==== Results ====
Republican primary results
Party	Candidate	Votes	%
Republican	Jack Hawley	38,210	60.24
Republican	George V. Hansen	25,223	39.76
Total votes		63,433	

== General election ==
=== Results ===
1962 United States Senate election in Idaho
Party	Candidate	Votes	%
Democratic	Frank Church (incumbent)	141,657	54.74
Republican	Jack Hawley	117,129	45.26
Majority		24,528	9.48
Turnout		258,786	
Democratic hold			

== See also ==
- 1962 United States Senate elections

== Bibliography ==
- Congressional Elections, 1946-1996. Washington, D.C.: Congressional Quarterly Inc. 1998. ISBN 1-56802-248-4.
- Scammon, Richard M., ed. (1964). America Votes 5: a handbook of contemporary American election statistics, 1962. Washington, D.C.: Governmental Affairs Institute.
