= Jim Hansen (Idaho politician) =

American politician (born 1959)

Jim D. Hansen

Commissioner of the Ada County Highway District
- Incumbent
- Assumed office 2012

Member of the Idaho House of Representatives from the 13B district
- In office December 1, 1992 – December 1, 1994
- Preceded by: Bill Taylor
- Succeeded by: Dave Baumann

Member of the Idaho House of Representatives from the 20B district
- In office December 1, 1988 – December 1, 1992
- Preceded by: Jack Kennevick
- Succeeded by: Robbi King

Personal details
- Born: James Duncan Hansen; November 5, 1959 (age 66) Idaho Falls, Idaho, U.S.
- Party: Democratic
- Spouse: Joan Cartan-Hansen
- Relations: Orval Hansen (father)
- Children: 2
- Education: College of William & Mary (BA); University of Idaho (JD)

James Duncan Hansen (born November 5, 1959) is an American attorney and politician serving as a commissioner of the Ada County Highway District. He was the 2006 Democratic nominee for Congress in Idaho's 2nd district, but was defeated by four-term incumbent Mike Simpson.

Hansen was previously a member of the Idaho House of Representatives from 1988 to 1994.

== Early life and education ==
Hansen was born in Idaho Falls and moved with his family to Arlington, Virginia in 1969. His father, Orval Hansen, was elected to Congress in 1968 as a Republican from Idaho's 2nd district and served three terms.

Hansen earned a Bachelor of Arts degree from the College of William and Mary in 1982 and a Juris Doctor from the University of Idaho College of Law in 1985.

== Career ==
While in school, Hansen worked as a ranger and naturalist in Yellowstone National Park.

Hansen began his legal career as an intern for state Attorney General Jim Jones in 1984. He was a law clerk for Chief Justice Charles R. Donaldson of the Idaho Supreme Court from 1985 to 1986. He practiced law with Givens Pursley from 1985 to 1991, focusing primarily on water and natural resource issues.

Hansen was elected to the Idaho House of Representatives in 1988, representing southeast Boise, and was re-elected in 1990 and 1992. Hansen imposed his own term limits and voluntarily retired in 1994.

In 1995 Hansen founded United Vision for Idaho, a coalition of organizations to empower participation in democracy and served as its first executive director. He took a sabbatical from that position during his run for the seat once held by his father but returned to the coalition after the election in 2006. Hansen resigned from United Vision for Idaho in April 2008 upon being named executive director of the Idaho Democratic Party.

In 2012, Hansen was elected as a commissioner of the Ada County Highway District for east and south Boise and eastern Ada County.

== Personal life ==
Hansen has been married to Joan Cartan-Hansen since 1990. They have two children. Hansen has one brother and five sisters; his mother, June, is a well-known actress in the Washington, D.C. area, who was awarded the Helen Hayes Award and been nominated several times.

Party political offices
Preceded by Lin Whitworth	Democratic Party nominee, Idaho's 2nd congressional district 2006 (lost)	Succeeded by Debbie Holmes
