= Herman Welker =

American politician (1906–1957)

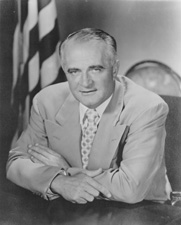

United States Senator from Idaho
- In office January 3, 1951 – January 3, 1957
- Preceded by: Glen H. Taylor
- Succeeded by: Frank Church

Member of the Idaho Senate
- In office January 5, 1949 – January 7, 1951
- Preceded by: James Young
- Succeeded by: J. Ben Wherry
- Constituency: Payette County

Prosecuting Attorney of Washington County, Idaho
- In office 1929–1935
- Preceded by: Delton L. Carter
- Succeeded by: John J. Peacock

Personal details
- Born: December 11, 1906 Cambridge, Idaho, U.S.
- Died: October 30, 1957 (aged 50) Bethesda, Maryland, U.S.
- Resting place: Arlington National Cemetery
- Party: Republican
- Spouse: Gladys Taylor Pence Welker (m. 1930)
- Children: 1
- Education: University of Idaho (LL.B.)

Military service
- Allegiance: United States
- Branch/service: U.S. Army Air Forces
- Years of service: 1943–44
- Rank: Corporal
- Battles/wars: World War II

Herman Orville Welker (December 11, 1906 – October 30, 1957) was an American politician from the state of Idaho. He was a member of the Idaho Republican Party and served one term in the United States Senate, from 1951 to 1957.

As a senator, Welker was a staunch conservative, an ally of Joseph McCarthy, and supporter of the second red scare. This was to such an extent that he was often nicknamed "Little Joe from Idaho." In the 1956 election, Welker lost reelection in a landslide to Democrat Frank Church, and died almost 10 months later.

== Early years ==
Born in Cambridge, Idaho, Welker was the youngest of seven children of John Thornton and Anna Zella Shepherd Welker, who had moved from North Carolina and started a potato farm. He was the grandson of Rev. George W. Welker of North Carolina. He attended grade school in Cambridge and high school in Weiser. After graduation from Weiser High School in 1924, Welker went north to Moscow to attend the University of Idaho, where he started off in a general studies program and was a member of the Sigma Chi fraternity. He switched to the College of Law in 1926 and graduated with an LL.B. degree in 1929.

== Legal career ==
In April 1929, Welker was appointed prosecuting attorney for Washington County; he graduated from law school in May, and was admitted to the bar later that year. He was re-elected and served as prosecutor from 1929 to 1935. In 1937, Welker moved to Los Angeles, where he had a private practice until 1943, when he enlisted in the U.S. Army Air Forces for World War II. He served until 1944, when he returned to Idaho and began to practice law in Payette. He was a member of the state senate from 1949 to 1951.

== U.S. Senate ==
In 1950, Welker ran for the U.S. Senate, as both seats were up for election that year. He won August's Republican primary over Congressman John Sanborn and Governor C. A. Robins, then defeated former Democratic Senator D. Worth Clark in the general election. Welker gained seats on several important committees, including the Armed Services and Judiciary committees. He soon distinguished himself as one of the most conservative and anticommunist senators, becoming a leading member and spokesperson for the Republican Party's right wing.

=== Harmon Killebrew ===
In the early 1950s, Welker told Washington Senators owner Clark Griffith about Harmon Killebrew, a young baseball player from Payette who was batting .847 for a semi-professional team at the time. Griffith told his farm director Ossie Bluege about the tip and Bluege flew to Idaho to watch Killebrew play. The Boston Red Sox also expressed interest but Bluege succeeded in signing Killebrew to a $50,000 contract on June 19, 1954. Killebrew (1936–2011) had a Hall of Fame career in the major leagues, with 573 home runs.

=== Association with Joseph McCarthy ===
In the early 1950s, Welker became closely associated with fellow Republican Senator Joseph McCarthy of Wisconsin and "McCarthyism", so much so that he was often referred to by Senate colleagues as "Little Joe from Idaho." In 1954, Welker was McCarthy's chief defender during censure proceedings in the U.S. Senate against McCarthy for the questionable investigative techniques McCarthy had used in pursuing individuals he accused of being communists, and others he accused of being homosexuals, within the government. Welker was one of 22 Republicans (out of a total of 46 Republican senators) who voted against the censure of McCarthy in 1954 for these "red scare" communist witch hunts, and his so-called "lavender scare" tactics aimed at homosexuals in government.

Welker, along with Republican Senator Styles Bridges of New Hampshire, was a key collaborator with McCarthy in the blackmail of Democratic Senator Lester C. Hunt of Wyoming and his son, which led to Hunt's suicide in his Senate office on June 19, 1954. Welker threatened Hunt, a staunch opponent of McCarthy's tactics, that if he did not immediately resign from the Senate and end his re-election bid that year, Welker would see that the younger Hunt's arrest for soliciting an undercover policeman was prosecuted and would widely publicize Hunt Jr.'s alleged homosexuality. Welker also threatened Inspector Roy Blick of the Morals Division of the Washington Police Department with the loss of his job if he failed to prosecute the younger Hunt. After Hunt's suicide, a Republican, Edward D. Crippa, was appointed by the Republican acting governor of Wyoming, Clifford Joy Rogers, to fill the vacant seat.

Alex Ross in The New Yorker wrote in 2012 of an event "loosely dramatized in the novel and film Advise & Consent [in which] Senator Lester Hunt, of Wyoming, killed himself after ... Welker [and others] ... threatened to expose Hunt's son as a homosexual".

In 1955, Welker would be one of two non-Southern senators to vote against the nomination of John Marshall Harlan II to the Supreme Court, opposing Harlan because he was unsatisfied that Harlan "adheres to the doctrine that American sovereignty could not and must not be diluted." A year later, he was one of only five senators from outside the former Conferderacy to vote against the nomination of Simon Sobeloff to the Fourth Circuit.

=== 1956 re-election bid ===
In 1956, Welker ran for a second term in the Senate. Although he won the Republican nomination, again defeating Sanborn, he lost the general election to 32-year-old Democrat Frank Church of Boise, by 46,315 votes, Welker received 39% to Church's 56%. One of the issues was whether the proposed Hells Canyon Dam would be publicly or privately owned with one of Church's aides saying "The campaign was Frank Church against Idaho Power. They fought him tooth and nail."

The defeat increased Democratic control of the Senate and led to much anger within the Republican Party, with Joseph McCarthy even accusing President Dwight Eisenhower of not supporting Welker's reelection campaign enough.

=== Election results ===
U.S. Senate elections in Idaho (Class III): Results 1950–1956
Year	Democrat	Votes	Pct	Republican	Votes	Pct	3rd Party	Party	Votes	Pct
1950	D. Worth Clark	77,180	38.3%	Herman Welker	124,237	61.7%				
1956	Frank Church	149,096	56.2%	Herman Welker (inc.)	102,781	38.7%	Glen H. Taylor		13,415	5.1%

== Death ==
After leaving the Senate in January 1957, Welker practiced law in Boise and participated in farming. After a few months, however, he became ill, and traveled to Bethesda, Maryland, for medical treatment at the National Institutes of Health. He was admitted on October 16, 1957, where he was diagnosed with a brain tumor. Operations were quickly performed, but Welker died later that month at age 50. McCarthy had died earlier that year in Bethesda (Welker had attended McCarthy's funeral).

Welker's funeral was at Fort Myer and he was interred in Arlington National Cemetery. He married Gladys Taylor Pence in 1930, and they had a daughter, Nancy.

Party political offices
Preceded by C. A. Bottolfsen	Republican Party nominee, U.S. Senator (Class 3) from Idaho; 1950 (won), 1956 (lost)	Succeeded by Jack Hawley
U.S. Senate
Preceded by Glen H. Taylor	U.S. senator (Class 3) from Idaho; January 3, 1951 – January 3, 1957; Served alongside: Henry Dworshak	Succeeded by Frank Church
