= 1950 United States Senate election in Idaho =

- November 7, 1950
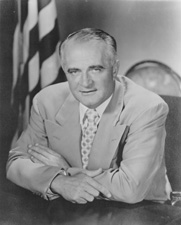

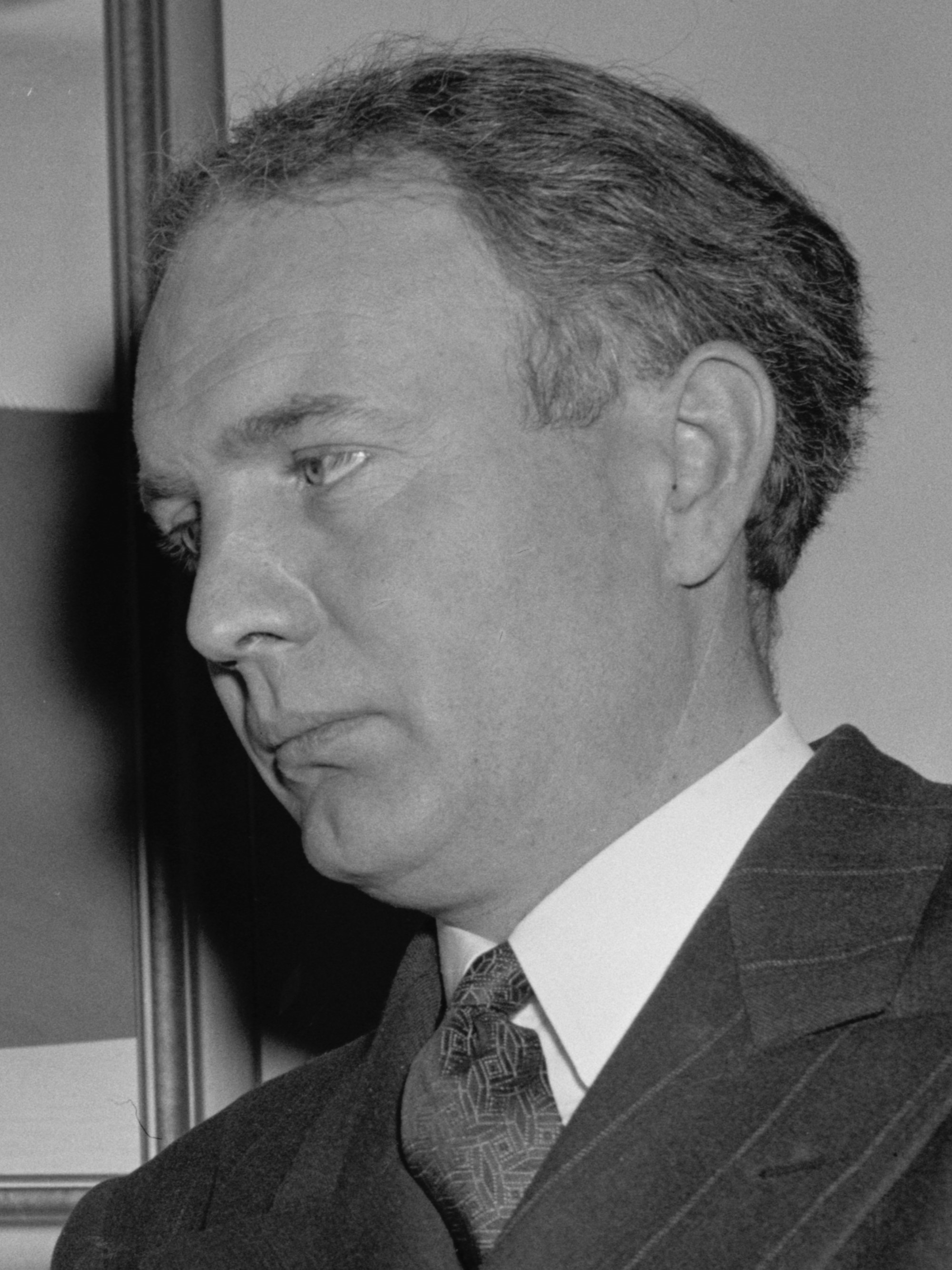
Nominee	Herman Welker	D. Worth Clark
Party	Republican	Democratic
Popular vote	124,237	77,180
Percentage	61.68%	38.32%
- County results Welker: 50–60% 60–70% 70–80% Clark: 50–60% 60–70%
U.S. senator before election
Glen H. Taylor
Democratic
Elected U.S. Senator
Herman Welker
Republican

The 1950 United States Senate election in Idaho took place on November 7, 1950. One-term Democrat Glen H. Taylor lost renomination to the class 3 seat to his predecessor D. Worth Clark. Taylor had beaten Clark for the Democratic nomination in 1944, and this year Clark did the same to him. However, in the general election, Clark was easily beaten by Republican State senator Herman Welker.

This was the third election in a row for this seat where the incumbent Democratic Senator lost renomination.

== Primary elections ==
Primary elections were held on August 8, 1950.

=== Democratic primary ===
==== Candidates ====
- D. Worth Clark, former U.S. Senator
- Glen H. Taylor, U.S. Senator
- Compton I. White, Sr., U.S. Representative from the 1st district

==== Results ====
Democratic primary results
Party	Candidate	Votes	%
Democratic	D. Worth Clark	26,897	39.88
Democratic	Glen H. Taylor (incumbent)	25,949	38.47
Democratic	Compton I. White, Sr.	14,599	21.65
Total votes		67,455	

=== Republican primary ===
==== Candidates ====
- Herman Welker, State Senator
- John C. Sanborn, U.S. Representative from the 2nd district
- C. A. Robins, Governor of Idaho

==== Results ====
Republican primary results
Party	Candidate	Votes	%
Republican	Herman Welker	25,034	38.90
Republican	John C. Sanborn	20,988	32.61
Republican	C. A. Robins	18,331	28.49
Total votes		64,353	

== General election ==
=== Results ===
1950 United States Senate election in Idaho
Party	Candidate	Votes	%
Republican	Herman Welker	124,237	61.68
Democratic	D. Worth Clark	77,180	38.32
Turnout		201,417	
Republican gain from Democratic			
