= 1968 United States Senate election in Idaho =

- November 5, 1968
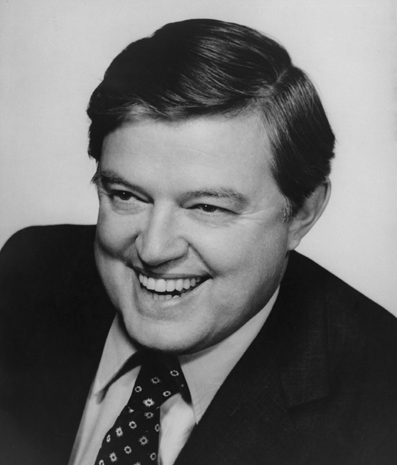

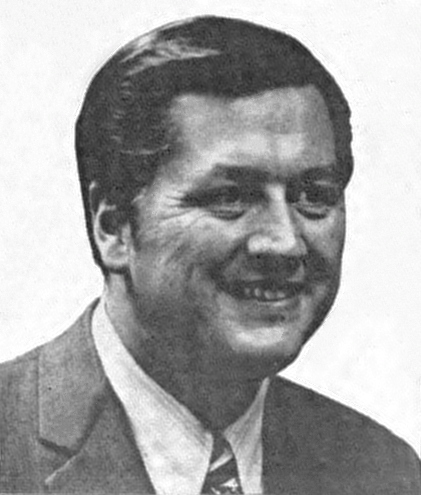
| Nominee | Frank Church | George V. Hansen |
| Party | Democratic | Republican |
| Popular vote | 173,482 | 114,394 |
| Percentage | 60.26% | 39.74% |
- County results Church: 50–60% 60–70% 70–80% 80–90% Hansen: 50–60%
U.S. senator before election
Frank Church
Democratic
Elected U.S. Senator
Frank Church
Democratic

The 1968 United States Senate election in Idaho took place on Tuesday, November 5. Democratic incumbent Frank Church was re-elected to a third term in office, defeating Republican U.S. Representative George V. Hansen.

== General election ==
=== Results ===
1968 United States Senate election in Idaho
| Party | Candidate | Votes | % | ±% |
|---|---|---|---|---|
| Democratic | Frank Church (incumbent) | 173,482 | 60.26% | ▲5.52 |
| Republican | George V. Hansen | 114,394 | 39.74% | ▼5.52 |
| Total votes | | 287,876 | 100.00% | |
| Democratic hold | | Swing | | |

== See also ==
- 1968 United States Senate elections
