= 1960 United States Senate election in Idaho =

- November 8, 1960
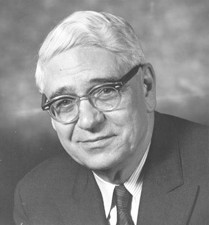

Nominee	Henry Dworshak	Bob McLaughlin
Party	Republican	Democratic
Popular vote	152,646	139,448
Percentage	52.26%	47.74%
- County results Dworshak: 50–60% 60–70% McLaughlin: 50–60% 60–70%
U.S. senator before election
Henry Dworshak
Republican
Elected U.S. Senator
Henry Dworshak
Republican

The 1960 United States Senate election in Idaho took place on November 8, 1960. Incumbent Republican Senator Henry Dworshak won re-election to a fourth term.

== Primary elections ==
Primary elections were held on June 7, 1960, with the Democratic runoff being held three weeks later on June 28.

=== Democratic primary ===
==== Candidates ====
- Gregg Potvin, attorney
- Bob McLaughlin, lawyer
- Compton I. White Jr., mayor of Clark Fork
- A. W. Brunt, real estate agent
- Joseph R. Garry, president of the American Congress of Indians

==== Results ====
Democratic primary results
Party	Candidate	Votes	%
Democratic	Gregg Potvin	16,524	23.73
Democratic	Bob McLaughlin	14,694	21.10
Democratic	Compton I. White Jr.	14,515	20.84
Democratic	A. W. Brunt	13,015	18.69
Democratic	Joseph R. Garry	10,899	15.65
Total votes		69,647	

Democratic primary runoff results
Party	Candidate	Votes	%
Democratic	Bob McLaughlin	13,117	51.86
Democratic	Gregg Potvin	12,174	48.14
Total votes		25,291	

=== Republican primary ===
==== Candidates ====
- Henry Dworshak, incumbent U.S. Senator

==== Results ====
Republican primary results
Party	Candidate	Votes	%
Republican	Henry Dworshak (incumbent)	44,030	100.00
Total votes		44,030	

== General election ==
=== Results ===
1960 United States Senate election in Idaho
Party	Candidate	Votes	%
Republican	Henry Dworshak (Incumbent)	152,648	52.26
Democratic	R. F. McLaughlin	139,448	47.74
Majority		13,200	4.52
Turnout		292,096	
Republican hold			

== See also ==
- 1960 United States Senate elections

== Bibliography ==
- Congressional Elections, 1946-1996. Washington, D.C.: Congressional Quarterly Inc. 1998. ISBN 1-56802-248-4.
