= Roy Early Blick =

- Born: December 21, 1899; Petersburg, Virginia, U.S.
- Died: June 18, 1972 (aged 72); Washington, D.C., U.S.
- Resting place: Culpeper National Cemetery
- Other names: Roy Blick, Roy E. Blick
- Police career
- Department: Metropolitan Police Department of the District of Columbia
- Service years: 1931-1972
- Rank: Deputy Chief of Police
- Military career
- Spouse: Lee Anna Embrey Blick
- Allegiance: United States
- Service: United States Army
- Service years: 1917–1919
- Rank: Private
- Unit: 114th Ambulance Company
- Wars: World War I

Roy Early Blick (December 21, 1899 – June 18, 1972) was the director of the Morals Division (the vice squad) of the Metropolitan Police Department of the District of Columbia (MPD) in the United States during the mid-twentieth-century. He oversaw investigation of and apprehension for offenses related to burlesque, pornography, child pornography, and other obscenity and indecency, prostitution, crimes of "sex perversion" including homosexuality, and gambling. Even before becoming director of the Morals Division, during his preceding career with the MPD, he was consulted by US federal lawmakers, testified before Congress on several occasions, and worked with the FBI on related law enforcement matters. Freedom of Information Act lawsuits in the twenty-first century revealed previously-classified documents indicating frequent meetings and correspondence between the Central Intelligence Agency and Blick during his service as a police official.

Blick oversaw operations similar to the later 1989 DC prostitute expulsion: en masse coercion of sex workers to leave the city.

In 1954 a newspaper report stated that US senators Styles Bridges and Herman Welker threatened to compel Blick's resignation if he did not take steps to ensure the prosecution of the son of fellow senator Lester C. Hunt—Lester Hunt, Jr.—who had been arrested for soliciting an undercover policeman.

Blick married Lee Anna Embrey, an author and charter staff member at the founding of the National Science Foundation who later joined the National Academy of Sciences. His career in the MPD began in 1931 and he rose to the rank of Deputy Chief of Police.

[Pornography] is more dangerous than narcotics, because you inject narcotics to an individual and it is over with. These pamphlets, these booklets, can be passed from one to another.

It is the same as a prostitute that can infect an army of men if she is permitted to hang around the camp. It is the same as this pornography that is being passed around. It can be passed from one hand to another, and it is causing a lot of headaches in the country. It is causing kids who are just at the age that they should know right from wrong to become perverts and homosexuals.

— Blick testifying to the Senate Subcommittee on Juvenile Delinquency, May 26, 1955

Preceded by Clarence H. Lutz	Director of the Morals Division of the Metropolitan Police Department of the District of Columbia	Succeeded by Charles Light
