= George V. Hansen =

American politician (1930–2014)

George Hansen
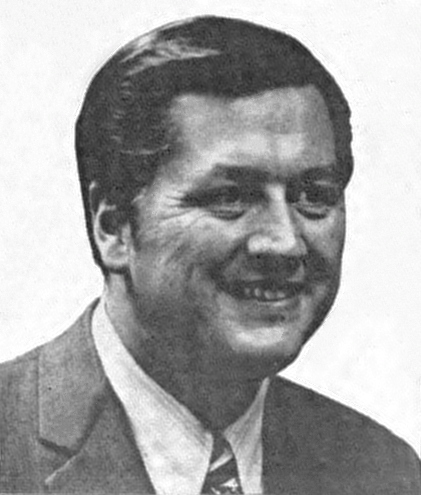
- Hansen in 1975

Member of the U.S. House of Representatives from Idaho's 2nd district
- In office January 3, 1975 – January 3, 1985
- Preceded by: Orval Hansen
- Succeeded by: Richard Stallings
- In office January 3, 1965 – January 3, 1969
- Preceded by: Ralph Harding
- Succeeded by: Orval Hansen

Mayor of Alameda, Idaho
- In office 1961–1962

Personal details
- Born: George Vernon Hansen; September 14, 1930 Tetonia, Idaho, U.S.
- Died: August 14, 2014 (aged 83) Pocatello, Idaho, U.S.
- Party: Republican
- Spouse: Connie Hansen (Deceased 2013)
- Education: Brigham Young University, Idaho (BA); Idaho State University

Military service
- Branch/service: United States Air Force
- Years of service: 1951–1954 (active); 1964–1970 (reserve)
- Unit: United States Naval Reserve

George Vernon Hansen (September 14, 1930 – August 14, 2014) was an American politician from Idaho. He served in the U.S. House of Representatives for 14 years, representing Idaho's 2nd district from 1965 to 1969 and again from 1975 to 1985.

== Biography ==
Born in Tetonia, Idaho, Hansen graduated from Ricks College (now Brigham Young University-Idaho) in 1956 and did graduate work at Idaho State University. He served in the U.S. Air Force from 1951 to 1954 and was an officer in the U.S. Naval Reserve from 1964 to 1970. Hansen moved to Alameda, Idaho, and was established as a life insurance salesman by 1958.

== Career ==
Hansen was elected Mayor of Alameda in 1961 and supported its merger with Pocatello the following year. Following the merger, Hansen served as a Pocatello City Commissioner until 1965.

He was an unsuccessful candidate in the primary for the U.S. Senate in 1962, but won a seat in the House two years later in the 2nd district, ousting Democratic incumbent Ralph Harding. He was one of the few Republican challengers to unseat a Democrat in the wake of Lyndon B. Johnson's 44-state landslide that year.

He again ran for the U.S. Senate in 1968, but lost by a wide margin to two-term incumbent Frank Church, who would serve four terms. Hansen ran a third unsuccessful Senate campaign in 1972, losing the primary to 1st district congressman Jim McClure.

In 1974, Hansen sought to take his House seat back. He defeated his successor in Congress, three-term incumbent Orval Hansen in the August primary and won the general election to return to the U.S. House. As in 1964, Hansen was one of the few bright spots in a disastrous year for Republicans; in this case, anger at Watergate. In Washington, Hansen was known as one of the most conservative members of Congress, and a particularly vocal critic of the Internal Revenue Service.

Hansen went to Tehran in 1979 amidst the Iran hostage crisis to try to negotiate with the hostage takers through the fence of the U.S. Embassy. No hostages were released. In 1980 Hansen published a book titled To Harass Our People: The IRS and Government Abuse of Power.

Hansen was reelected four times. However, in 1984, his Democratic opponent from two years earlier, Richard Stallings, defeated him by less than 200 votes even in the midst of Ronald Reagan's 49-state landslide that year. Hansen tried unsuccessfully to challenge the election result.

== Corruption scandals ==
=== Campaign finance law violations ===
In 1974, Hansen became the first member of Congress to be convicted of violating a 1971 campaign finance law requiring disclosure of all financial contributions to his campaign. A federal judge found him guilty of not disclosing all his loans and profits, and sentenced him to pay a fine.

=== Failure to file income tax forms ===
In October 1976, it was revealed by the Lewiston Morning Tribune that Hansen had failed to file his income tax returns for several years. The first instance was in the spring of 1969 when Hansen had a pending USDA appointment and a routine background check by the FBI had found the omission. The director of the IRS office in Boise was ordered by higher ups in the Treasury Department to open the office on a Saturday (May 3, 1969) so that Hansen could travel to Boise from Washington, D.C. to file the delinquent taxes for years 1966, 1967 and 1968 and pay what was owed. Hansen was also late filing for 1970, 1971, 1973 and 1975. A month later Hansen still managed to win reelection, although by the smallest margin in November 1976 among his many elections to Congress, until his defeat in 1984.

=== Filing false disclosure statements ===
In 1983, Hansen was indicted by a federal grand jury on four charges of filing false financial disclosure statements. He was accused of concealing more than $245,000 in loans and $87,000 in profits from silver speculation, much of it in his wife's name.

=== Violation of Ethics Act ===
In 1984 Hansen was convicted of violating the 1978 Ethics in Government Act. He had failed to disclose $334,000 in personal loans to his campaign. He was sentenced to six months in prison and fined $40,000. Appealing all the way to the US Supreme Court, his conviction was vacated and the fine returned to him.

=== Bank fraud ===
In 1992, Hansen was in prison again on charges of defrauding two Idaho banks and 100 individuals in a $30 million investment scheme. He was sentenced to four years in prison.

== Death ==
On August 14, 2014, he died at a hospital in Pocatello, Idaho, at the age of 83.

== Election results ==
U.S. House elections (Idaho's 2nd district): Results 1964–1966, 1974–1984
Year	Democrat	Votes	Pct	Republican	Votes	Pct
1964	Ralph Harding (inc.)	84,022	47.8%	George Hansen	91,838	52.2%
1966	A.W. "Bill" Brunt	33,348	29.7%	George Hansen (inc.)	79,024	70.3%
1974	Max Hanson	53,599	44.3%	George Hansen	67,274	55.7%
1976	Stan Kress	82,237	49.4%	George Hansen (inc.)	84,175	50.6%
1978	Stan Kress	60,040	42.7%	George Hansen (inc.)	80,591	57.3%
1980	Diane Bilyeu	81,364	41.2%	George Hansen (inc.)	116,196	58.8%
1982	Richard Stallings	76,608	47.7%	George Hansen (inc.)	83,873	52.3%
1984	Richard Stallings	101,266	50.03%	George Hansen (inc.)	101,133	49.97%

U.S. Senate elections in Idaho (Class III): Results 1968
Year	Democrat	Votes	Pct	Republican	Votes	Pct
1968	Frank Church (inc.)	173,482	60.3%	George Hansen	114,394	39.7%

== Books ==
- To harass our people: The IRS and government abuse of power, Positive Publications, (1981).
- How the IRS seizes your dollars and how to fight back, Simon and Schuster, (1981), ISBN 0-671-42795-4.

== See also ==
- List of American federal politicians convicted of crimes
- List of federal political scandals in the United States
- List of United States representatives expelled, censured, or reprimanded

U.S. House of Representatives
Preceded by Ralph Harding	Member of the U.S. House of Representatives from Idaho's 2nd congressional district 1965–1969	Succeeded by Orval Hansen
Preceded by Orval Hansen	Member of the U.S. House of Representatives from Idaho's 2nd congressional district 1975–1985	Succeeded by Richard Stallings
Party political offices
Preceded by Jack Hawley	Republican nominee for U.S. Senator from Idaho (Class 3); 1968	Succeeded by Robert Smith
