= 1948 United States Senate election in Idaho =

- November 2, 1948
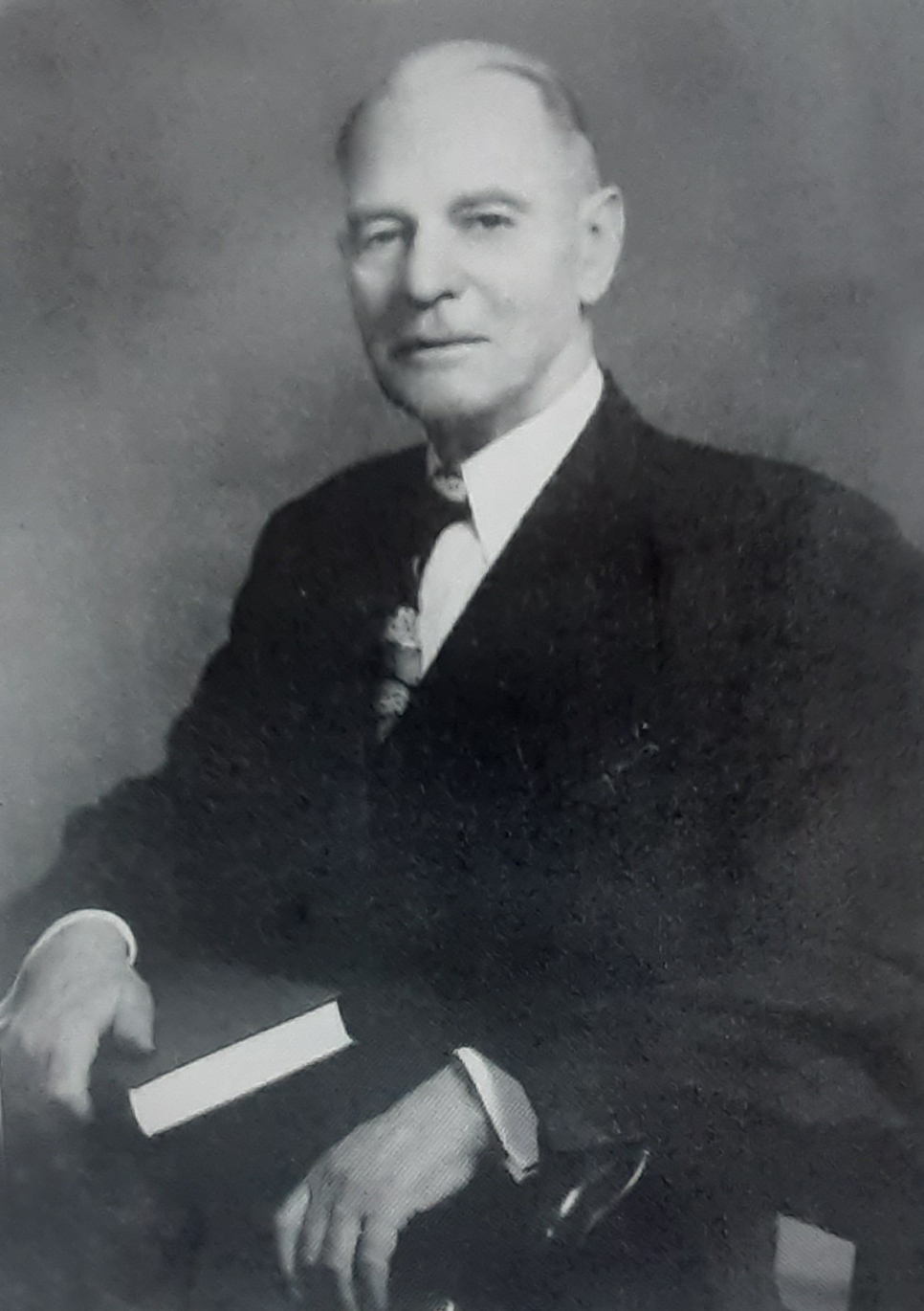

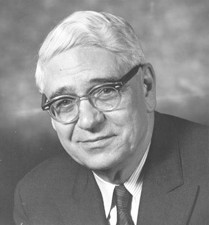
Nominee	Bert H. Miller	Henry Dworshak
Party	Democratic	Republican
Popular vote	107,000	103,868
Percentage	49.96%	48.49%
- County results Miller: 40–50% 50–60% 60–70% 70–80% Dworshak: 40–50% 50–60% 60–70%
U.S. senator before election
Henry Dworshak
Republican
Elected U.S. Senator
Bert H. Miller
Democratic

The 1948 United States Senate election in Idaho took place on November 2, 1948. Incumbent Republican Senator Henry Dworshak, who had previously won a partial term in the special election of 1946, lost re-election to a full term to Bert H. Miller, a justice of the Idaho Supreme Court and the former Attorney General of Idaho. This is the only time Democrats have won the Class 2 Senate seat in Idaho.

This election was a rematch of the election for Idaho's 2nd congressional district in 1938, where Dworshak defeated Miller, with Dworshak getting 53.6% of the vote to Miller's 46.4%.

Bert H. Miller died in office in October 1949, less than a year into his term, and Idaho governor C. A. Robins appointed Henry Dworshak back to the seat, who would then win the 1950 special election, and be re-elected twice more before dying in office himself.

== Primary elections ==
Each candidate ran unopposed for their party in this election, so there were no primary elections.

=== Democratic primary ===
==== Candidates ====
- Bert H. Miller, justice of the Idaho Supreme Court and former Attorney General of Idaho (1933-1937, 1941-1945)

=== Republican primary ===
==== Candidates ====
- Henry Dworshak, incumbent U.S. Senator

== General election ==
=== Results ===
1948 United States Senate election in Idaho
Party	Candidate	Votes	%
Democratic	Bert H. Miller	107,000	49.96
Republican	Henry Dworshak (incumbent)	103,868	48.49
Progressive	John Derr	3,154	1.47
Socialist	Paul Wengert	166	0.08
Majority		3,132	1.47
Turnout		214,188	
Democratic gain from Republican			

== See also ==
- 1948 United States Senate elections
