= Orval Hansen =

American politician (1926–2017)

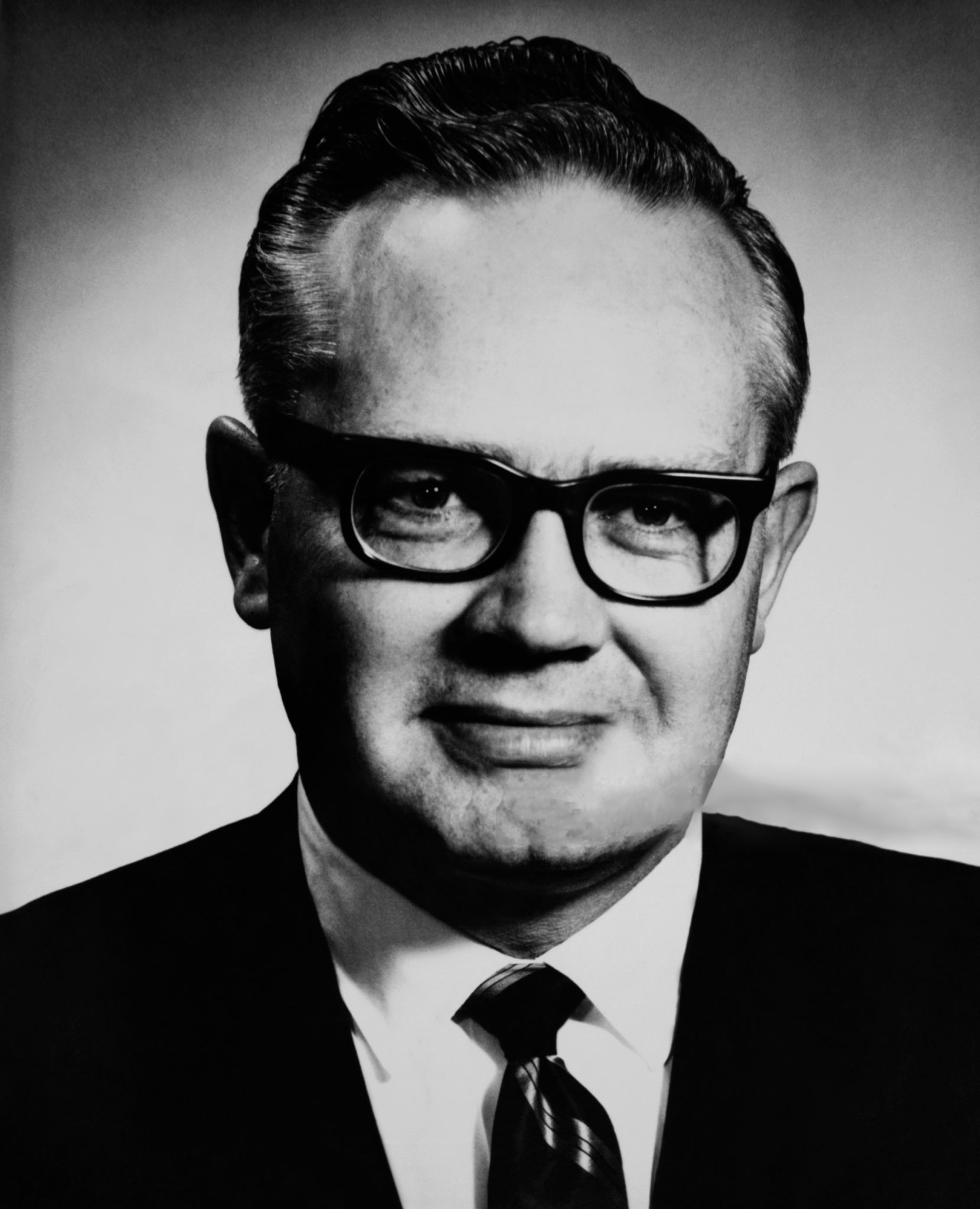
- Hansen in 1971

Member of the U.S. House of Representatives from Idaho's 2nd district
- In office January 3, 1969 – January 3, 1975
- Preceded by: George Hansen
- Succeeded by: George Hansen

Member of the Idaho Senate
- In office 1967–1969

Member of the Idaho House of Representatives
- In office 1957–1963; 1965–1966

Personal details
- Born: Orval Howard Hansen; August 3, 1926 Firth, Idaho, U.S.
- Died: November 2, 2017 (aged 91) Boise, Idaho, U.S.
- Party: Republican
- Spouse: June Duncan
- Children: 7, including Jim
- Education: University of Idaho, 1950; George Washington University, J.D., 1954; George Washington University, Ph.D., 1986
- Profession: Attorney, Military

Military service
- Allegiance: United States
- Branch/service: U.S. Navy, U.S. Air Force Reserve
- Years of service: 1944–46 (USN) ret. 1978 (USAF)
- Rank: Lt. Colonel
- Battles/wars: World War II, Cold War

Orval Howard Hansen (August 3, 1926 – November 2, 2017) was an American politician who served as a congressman from Idaho. He served three terms as a Republican in the House from 1969 to 1975, representing the state's 2nd district.

== Early years ==
Born on August 3, 1926, in Firth, Idaho, to Lily Dorothy Miriam (née Wahlquist) and Farrel L. Hansen, his mother the daughter of Swedish immigrants and his father of Danish descent. Hansen was raised in Idaho Falls and graduated from Idaho Falls High School in 1944. After military service in World War II, he attended the University of Idaho in Moscow, where he was a member of Phi Beta Kappa, Sigma Chi fraternity, and extremely active with campus activities. Hansen earned a B.A. summa cum laude in 1950 from UI and then attended George Washington University in Washington, D.C., and received a J.D. from its Law School in 1954. He also earned an LLM (awarded in 1973) and a Ph.D. in political science (awarded in 1986) from GWU.

He served in the U.S. Navy from 1944 to 1946, including one year in the Pacific on the aircraft carrier USS Saratoga, and was a member of the U.S. Air Force Reserve until his retirement as a lieutenant colonel in 1978.

== Political career ==
Hansen's political career began in the state legislature, where he served four terms in the House, beginning in 1956. He served as House Majority Leader from 1961 to 1962. In his first run for Congress in 1962, he won the GOP nomination in a June runoff, but lost the general election to incumbent Ralph Harding. He returned to the Idaho House for another two-year term, followed by one term in the state senate.

Hansen ran again for Congress, won the Republican primary over two others, and was elected to the open seat in 1968. He served three terms before being ousted in the 1974 Republican primary in August by the man he succeeded six years earlier, George Hansen (no relation). (George Hansen had vacated the seat in 1968 to run for the U.S. Senate, but lost to incumbent Frank Church.) U.S. Senator Mike Crapo got his first taste of Washington politics as an intern for Orval Hansen during summer 1972.

U.S. House elections (Idaho's 2nd district): Results 1962, 1968–1972
Year	Democrat	Votes	Pct	Republican	Votes	Pct	3rd Party	Party	Votes	Pct
1962	Ralph Harding (inc.)	83,152	52.8%	Orval Hansen	74,203	47.2%				
1968	Darrel V. Manning	54,256	43.9%	Orval Hansen	65,029	52.6%	Joel Anderson	Amer. Indep.	4,377	3.5%
1970	Marden E. Wells	31,872	31.6%	Orval Hansen (inc.)	66,428	65.8%	Joel Anderson	American	2,625	2.6%
1972	Willis H. Ludlow	40,081	27.0%	Orval Hansen (inc.)	102,537	69.2%	John L. Thiebert	American	5,560	3.8%

Following his service in Congress, Hansen returned to private law practice, and founded the Columbia Institute for Political Research in 1977.

== Personal life ==
Hansen was married to the former June Duncan of Southport; they have seven children. In 2006, Hansen's son Jim won the Democratic nomination for the 2nd district seat, but was defeated by incumbent Mike Simpson.

Hansen died at his home in Boise, Idaho on November 2, 2017, aged 91, from cancer.

U.S. House of Representatives
Preceded by George V. Hansen	Idaho Second Congressional District; January 3, 1969–January 3, 1975	Succeeded by George V. Hansen
