= 1954 United States Senate election in Idaho =

- November 2, 1954
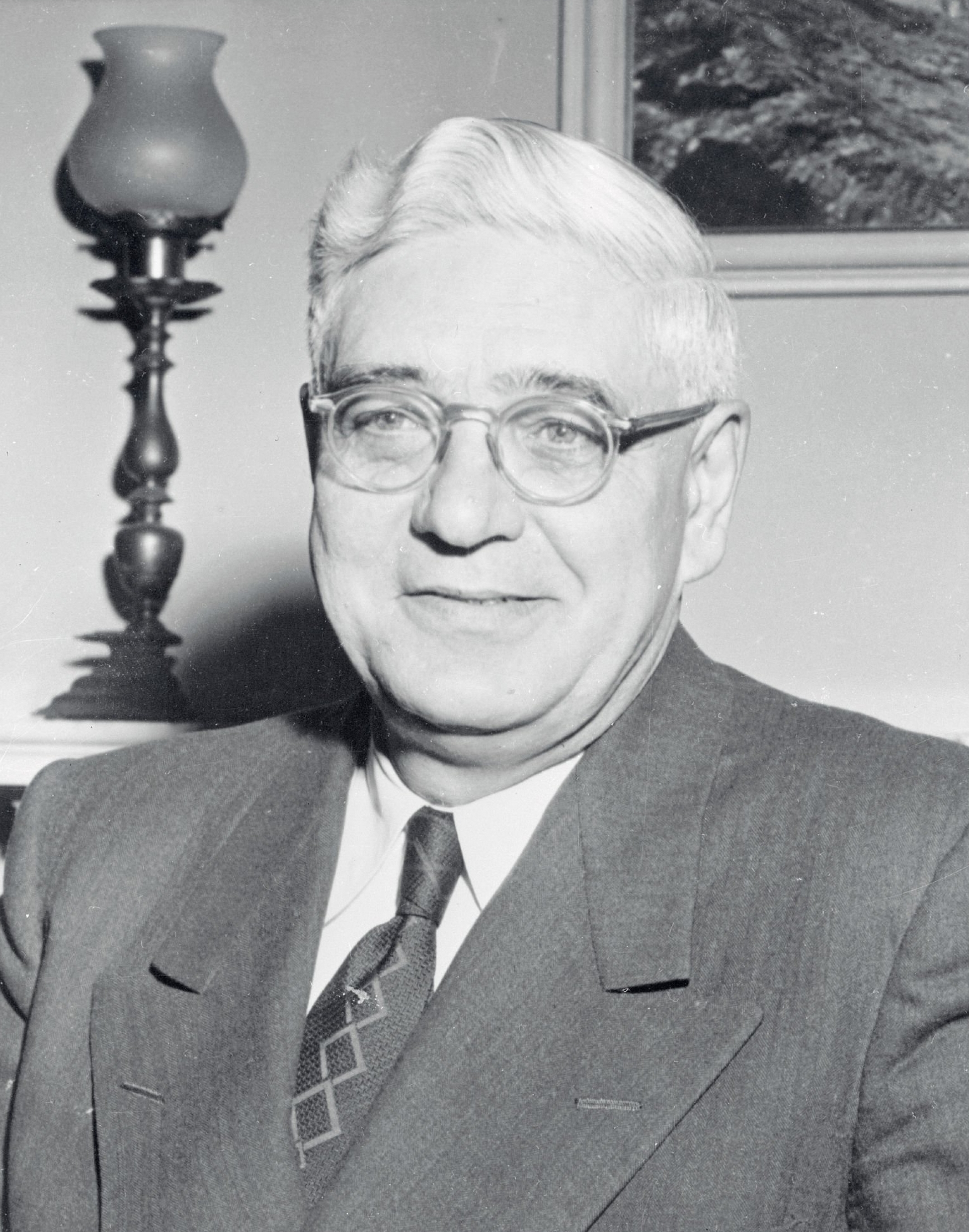

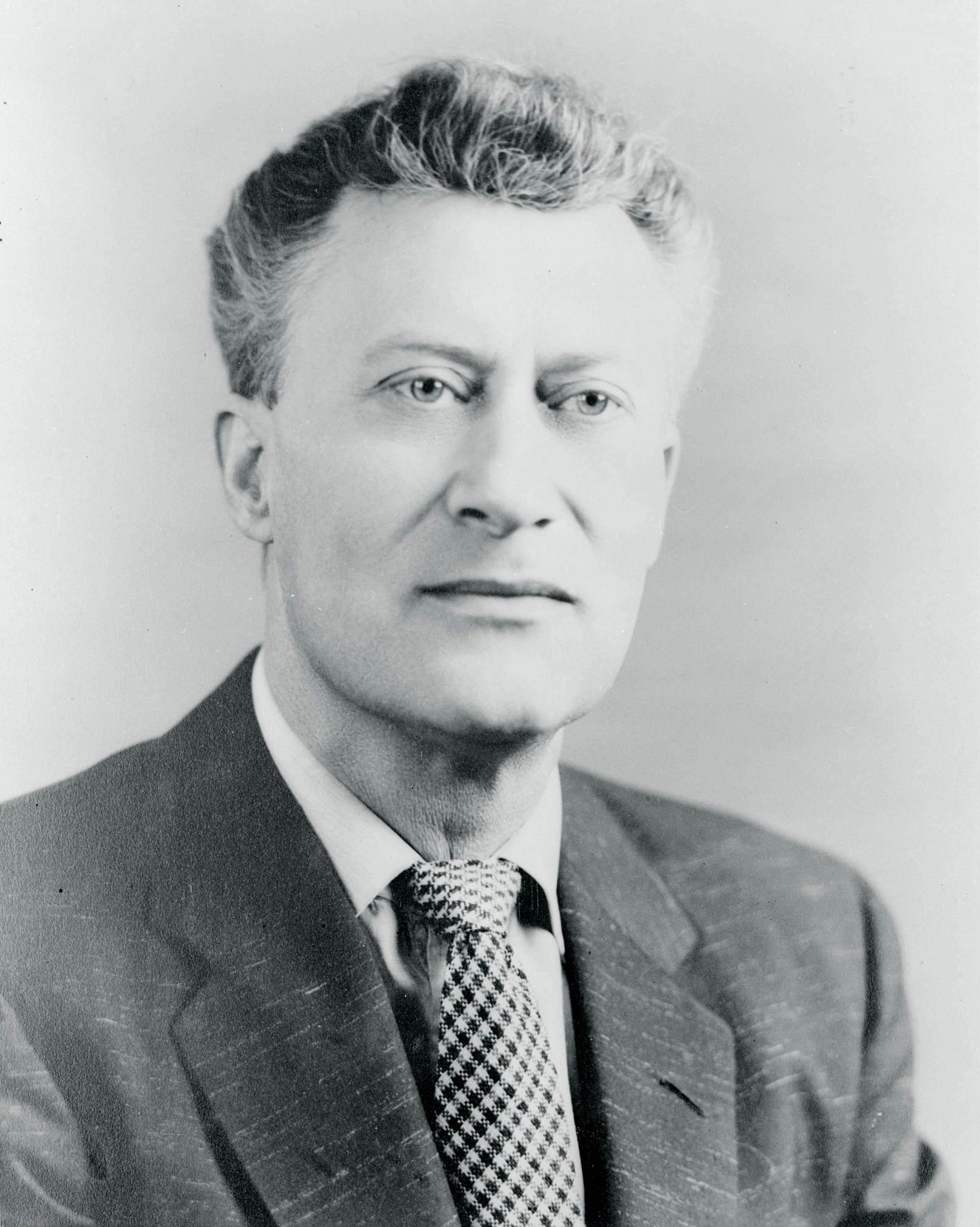
Nominee	Henry Dworshak	Glen H. Taylor
Party	Republican	Democratic
Popular vote	142,269	84,139
Percentage	62.84%	37.16%
- County results Dworshak: 50–60% 60–70% 70–80% Taylor: 50–60% 60–70%
U.S. senator before election
Henry Dworshak
Republican
Elected U.S. Senator
Henry Dworshak
Republican

The 1954 United States Senate election in Idaho took place on November 2, 1954. Incumbent Republican Senator Henry Dworshak won re-election to a third term, as well as a second consecutive term and first full term.

== Primary elections ==
Primary elections were held on August 10, 1954.

=== Democratic primary ===
==== Candidates ====
- Glen H. Taylor, former US Senator from Idaho (1945-1951), and Progressive Vice Presidential candidate in the 1948 presidential election
- Claude J. Burtenshaw, teacher, Democratic candidate for U.S. Senate in 1950 special election
- Alvin McCormack, farmer

==== Results ====
Democratic primary results
Party	Candidate	Votes	%
Democratic	Glen H. Taylor	26,591	41.32
Democratic	Claude J. Burtenshaw	24,094	37.44
Democratic	Alvin McCormack	13,673	21.25
Total votes		64,358	

=== Republican primary ===
==== Candidates ====
- Henry Dworshak, incumbent U.S. Senator
- Les Lambson

==== Results ====
Republican primary results
Party	Candidate	Votes	%
Republican	Henry Dworshak (incumbent)	56,333	87.57
Republican	Les Lambson	7,998	12.43
Total votes		64,331	

== General election ==
=== Results ===
Incumbent Henry Dworshak defeated Glen H. Taylor, who had previously represented Idaho in the Senate from 1945 to 1951. Allegations of Communist ties were used against Taylor by Dworshak and other Republicans to win the election.

1954 United States Senate election in Idaho
Party	Candidate	Votes	%
Republican	Henry Dworshak (Incumbent)	142,269	62.84
Democratic	Glen H. Taylor	84,139	37.16
Majority		58,130	25.68
Turnout		226,408	
Republican hold			

== See also ==
- 1954 United States Senate elections
