= Henry Dworshak =

Member of US Congress (1894–1962)

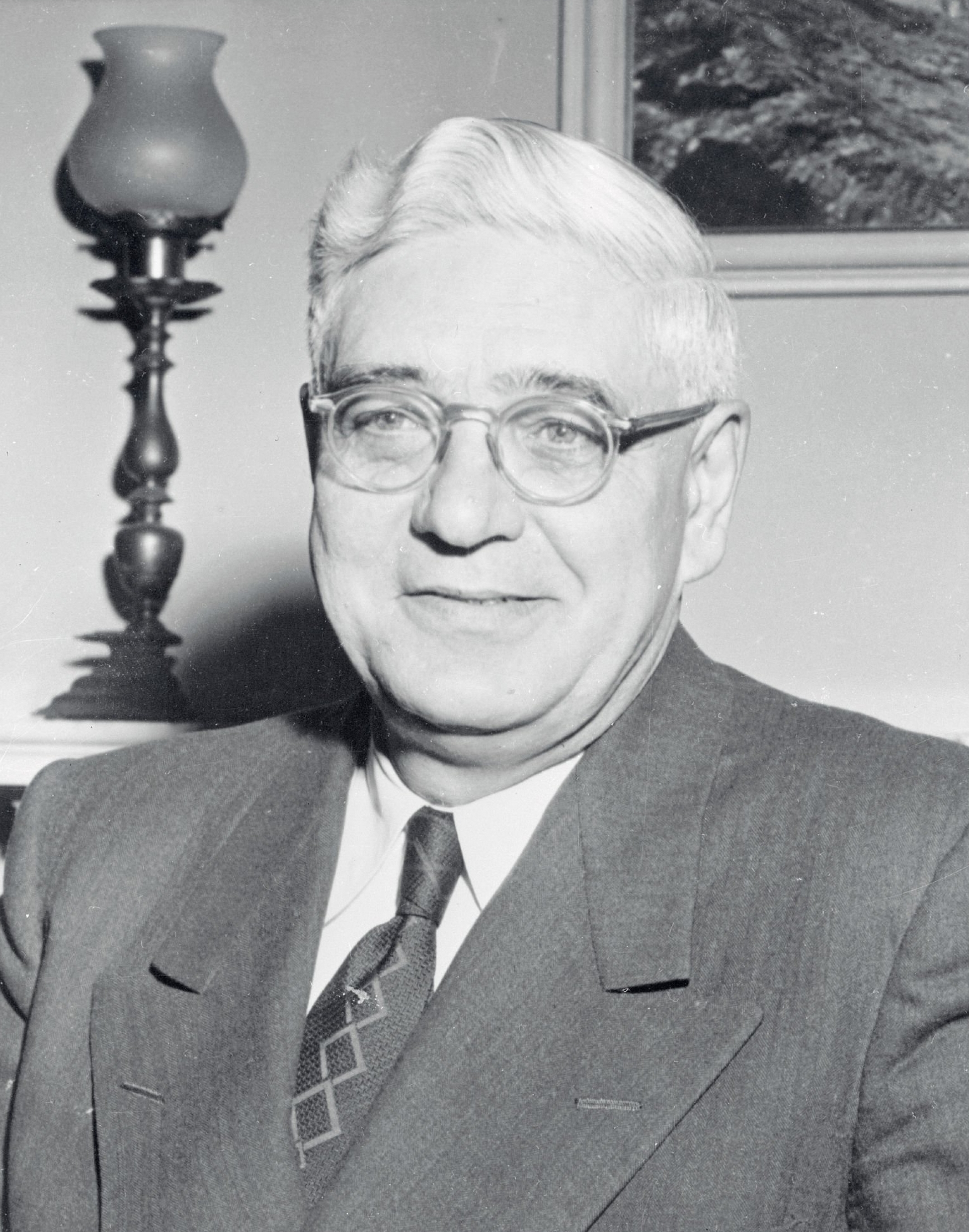
- Dworshak in 1950

United States Senator from Idaho
- In office October 14, 1949 – July 23, 1962
- Preceded by: Bert Miller
- Succeeded by: Len Jordan
- In office November 6, 1946 – January 3, 1949
- Preceded by: Charles Gossett
- Succeeded by: Bert Miller

Member of the U.S. House of Representatives from Idaho's 2nd district
- In office January 3, 1939 – November 6, 1946
- Preceded by: D. Worth Clark
- Succeeded by: John C. Sanborn

Personal details
- Born: Henry Clarence Dworshak Jr. August 29, 1894 Duluth, Minnesota, U.S.
- Died: July 23, 1962 (aged 67) Washington, D.C., U.S.
- Resting place: Arlington National Cemetery
- Party: Republican
- Spouse: Georgia B. Lowe (m. 1917)
- Children: 4
- Occupation: Publisher

Military service
- Allegiance: United States
- Branch/service: U.S. Army
- Rank: Sergeant
- Unit: 4th Antiaircraft; Machine Gun Battalion
- Battles/wars: World War I

Henry Clarence Dworshak Jr. (August 29, 1894 – July 23, 1962) was a United States senator and congressman from Idaho. Originally from Minnesota, he was a Republican from Burley, and served over 22 years in the House and Senate.

== Early years ==
Born in Duluth, Minnesota, Dworshak attended its local public schools and learned the printer's trade. During the First World War, he served as a Sergeant in the U.S. Army Fourth Antiaircraft Machine Gun Battalion in the American Expeditionary Forces. After the war, Dworshak managed a printing supply business in Duluth.

He moved west in 1924 to Burley, Idaho, to become the publisher and editor of the Burley Bulletin, a semi-weekly newspaper in Cassia County. Dworshak became a public figure when he was elected president of the Idaho Editorial Association in 1931, and he was a prominent member of the American Legion and Rotary International. He was also a member of the Elks and a freemason.

== Congress ==
=== House ===
Dworshak ran for Congress in 1936 in Idaho's 2nd district, but lost to incumbent D. Worth Clark. Two years later, in 1938, Clark ran for U.S. senator and won, and Dworshak won the open House seat. He was re-elected in 1940, 1942, and 1944.

U.S. House elections (Idaho's 2nd district): Results 1936–1944
Year	Democrat	Votes	Pct	Republican	Votes	Pct
1936	D. Worth Clark (inc.)	67,238	60.5%	Henry Dworshak	43,834	39.5%
1938	Bert H. Miller	47,199	46.4%	Henry Dworshak	54,527	53.6%
1940	Ira Masters	61,726	46.9%	Henry Dworshak (inc.)	69,804	53.1%
1942	Ira Masters	37,815	45.2%	Henry Dworshak (inc.)	45,805	54.8%
1944	Phil J. Evans	56,249	47.7%	Henry Dworshak (inc.)	61,751	52.3%

=== Senate ===
Republican senator John Thomas died in office in November 1945, and Democratic governor Charles C. Gossett resigned to accept an appointment (by his successor) to fill the seat. Gossett failed to secure the nomination for the special election; Dworshak defeated state senator George Donart in the November 1946 election to complete the term. Two years later, Dworshak was defeated for a full term in the 1948 general election by state supreme court justice and former state attorney general Bert H. Miller, he had defeated Miller ten years earlier.

Miller died of a heart attack in October 1949 after only nine months in office, and Dworshak was appointed his successor by Republican governor C. A. Robins. Dworshak won a special election in 1950, and was elected to full Senate terms in 1954 and 1960. A staunch isolationist like William Borah, Dworshak stood unwavering against overseas intervention, especially in U.S. affairs. Dworshak voted in favor of the Civil Rights Act of 1957 and the 24th Amendment to the U.S. Constitution, but did not vote on the Civil Rights Act of 1960.

U.S. Senate elections in Idaho (Class II): Results 1946–1960
Year	Democrat	Votes	Pct	Republican	Votes	Pct
1946 (Special)	George Donart	74,629	41.4%	Henry Dworshak	105,523	58.6%
1948	Bert H. Miller	107,000	50.0%	Henry Dworshak (inc.)	103,868	48.5%
1950 (Special)	Claude J. Burtenshaw	97,092	48.1%	Henry Dworshak (inc.^)	104,608	51.9%
1954	Glen H. Taylor	84,139	37.2%	Henry Dworshak (inc.)	142,269	62.8%
1960	R.L. "Bob" McLaughlin	139,448	47.7%	Henry Dworshak (inc.)	152,648	52.3%

Source: ^Dworshak was appointed to the vacant seat in November 1946 and October 1949

== Death ==
Dworshak died in office of a heart attack on July 23, 1962, at his home in Washington, D.C., and was buried at Arlington National Cemetery. His obituary described him as "...a staunchly conservative voice on Capitol Hill..." He was succeeded by former governor Len B. Jordan, who served until January 1973.

=== Legacy ===
- Dworshak Dam on the North Fork of the Clearwater River, near Orofino in northern Idaho
- Dworshak Elementary School in Burley

== See also ==
- List of members of the United States Congress who died in office (1950–1999)

U.S. House of Representatives
Preceded by D. Worth Clark	United States House of Representatives, Idaho Second Congressional District; January 3, 1939–November 6, 1946	Succeeded by John C. Sanborn
Party political offices
Preceded by John Thomas	Republican Party nominee, U.S. Senator (Class 2) from Idaho; 1946 special (won), 1948 (lost), 1950 special (won), 1954 (won), 1960 (won)	Succeeded by Len Jordan
U.S. Senate
Preceded by Charles C. Gossett	U.S. senator (Class 2) from Idaho; November 6, 1946–January 3, 1949; Served alongside: Glen H. Taylor	Succeeded by Bert H. Miller
Preceded by Bert Miller	U.S. senator (Class 2) from Idaho; October 14, 1949–July 23, 1962; Served alongside: Glen Taylor, Herman Welker, Frank Church	Succeeded by Len Jordan
