= Frank Church =

American politician and lawyer (1924–1984)

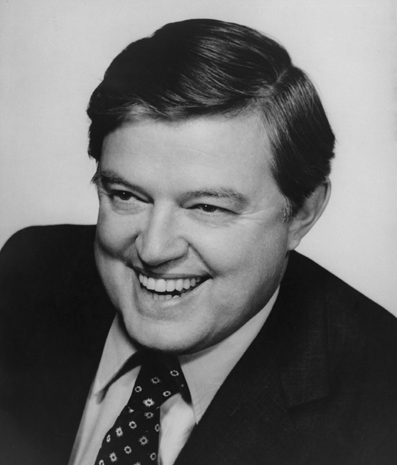
- Church in 1976

United States Senator from Idaho
- In office January 3, 1957 – January 3, 1981
- Preceded by: Herman Welker
- Succeeded by: Steve Symms
Committee chairmanships
Chair of the Senate Foreign Relations Committee
In office January 3, 1979 – January 3, 1981
Preceded by	John Sparkman
Succeeded by	Chuck Percy
Chair of the Senate Aging Committee
In office January 3, 1971 – January 3, 1979
Preceded by	Pete Williams
Succeeded by	Lawton Chiles

Personal details
- Born: Frank Forrester Church III; July 25, 1924 Boise, Idaho, U.S.
- Died: April 7, 1984 (aged 59) Bethesda, Maryland, U.S.
- Resting place: Morris Hill Cemetery; Boise, Idaho, U.S.
- Party: Democratic
- Spouse: Bethine Clark (m. 1947)
- Children: 2, including Forrest
- Education: Stanford University (BA, LLB)
- Occupation: Politician; lawyer

Military service
- Allegiance: United States
- Branch/service: United States Army
- Years of service: 1942–1946 (Note: His date of discharge is inconsistent, with some sources putting it instead in 1945.)
- Rank: Second Lieutenant
- Battles/wars: World War II; China Burma India Theater

Frank Forrester Church III (July 25, 1924 – April 7, 1984) was an American politician and lawyer. From 1957 to 1981, he served as a U.S. senator from Idaho, and is currently the last Democrat to do so. He was the longest serving Democratic senator from the state and the only Democrat from the state who served more than two terms in the Senate. Church was a prominent figure in American foreign policy and established a reputation as a member of the party's liberal wing.

Born and raised in Boise, Idaho, he enrolled at Stanford University in 1942 but left to enlist in the Army, where he served as a military intelligence officer in the China Burma India Theater of World War II. Following the end of the war, he completed his law degree from Stanford Law School and returned to Boise to practice law. Church became an active Democrat in Idaho and ran unsuccessfully for a seat in the state legislature in 1952. In 1956, he was elected to the United States Senate, defeating former Senator Glen Taylor in a closely contested primary election and incumbent Herman Welker in the general election.

As a senator, he was a protégé of then-Senate majority leader Lyndon B. Johnson, and was appointed to the Senate Foreign Relations Committee. In 1960, Church received national exposure when he gave the keynote speech at the 1960 Democratic National Convention. Considered a strong progressive and environmental legislator, he played a major role in the creation of a system of protected wilderness areas. Church was highly critical of the Vietnam War, despite initially supporting it; he co-authored the Cooper–Church Amendment of 1970 and the Case–Church Amendment of 1973, which sought to curtail the war. In 1975, he chaired the Senate Select Committee to Study Governmental Operations with Respect to Intelligence Activities, better known as the Church Committee, laying the groundwork for the Foreign Intelligence Surveillance Act of 1978.

Church belatedly sought the 1976 Democratic nomination for president, and announced his candidacy on March 18, 1976. Although he won primaries in Nebraska, Idaho, Oregon, and Montana, he withdrew in favor of former Georgia governor Jimmy Carter. Church was re-elected continuously to the Senate, defeating his Republican opponents in 1962, 1968, and 1974, until his defeat during the Republican wave of 1980. Following the end of his term, he practiced international law in Washington, D.C., specializing in Asian issues. Church was hospitalized for a pancreatic tumor on January 12, 1984, and he died less than three months later at his home in Bethesda, Maryland, on April 7, 1984.

== Early life ==
=== Youth, family, and early education ===
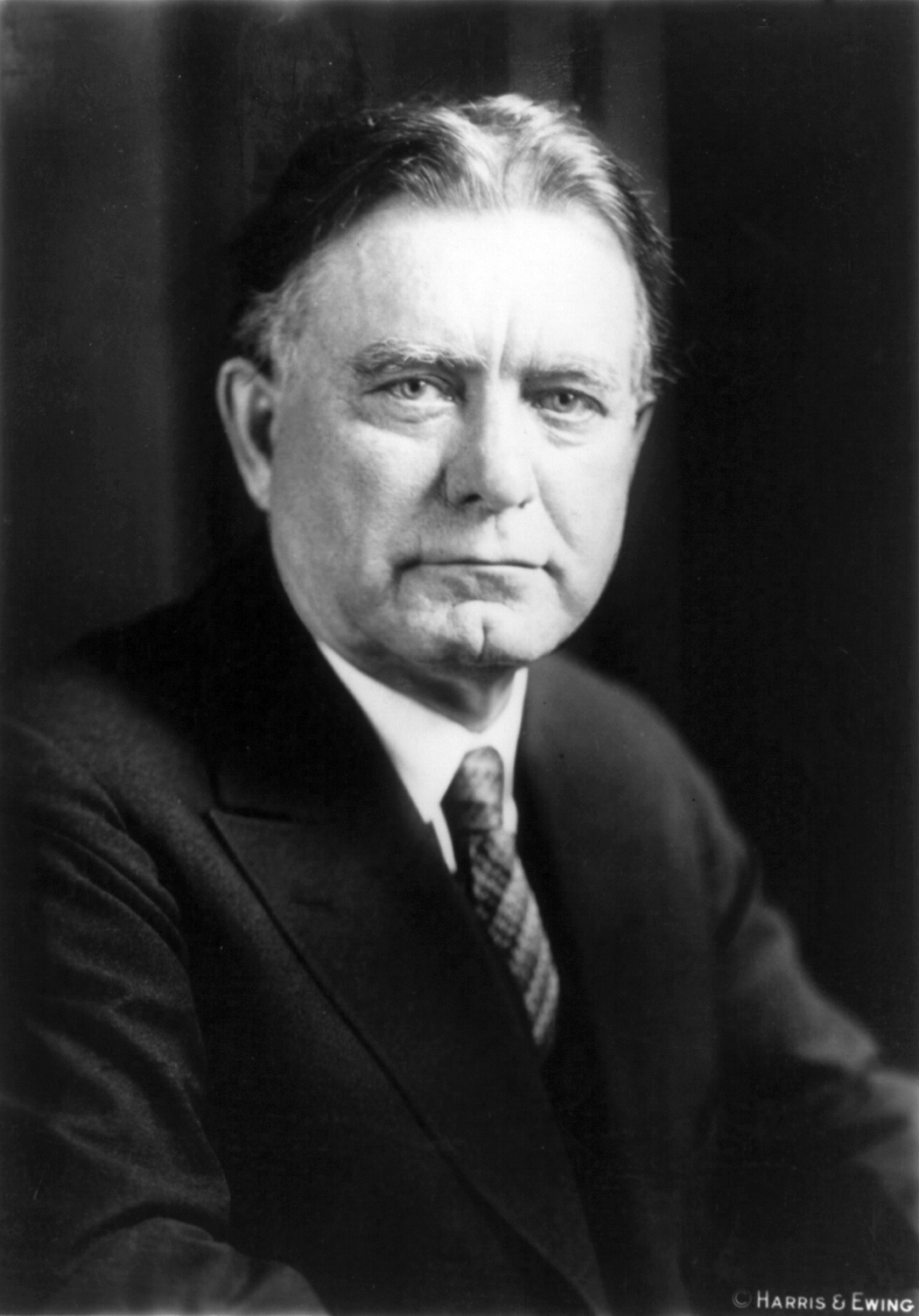
Senator William Borah, whom Church admired

Frank Forrester Church III was born on July 25, 1924, in Boise, Idaho. He traced his ancestry from the East Coast of the United States, with his grandfather, Frank Forrester Church I, moving to Idaho during the height of the gold rush that followed the end of the Civil War. Church III was the younger of two sons of Frank Forrester Church II and Laura Bilderback Church. His older brother Richard Church became a career officer in the United States Marine Corps, and retired as a colonel.

His father co-owned a sporting goods store and took the sons on fishing, hunting, and hiking outings in the Idaho mountains. The family was reportedly very Catholic and conservative, with Church attending St. Joseph's School as a youngster, where he went by the nickname "Frosty." In his youth, Church admired William Borah, who represented Idaho in the United States Senate from 1907 until his death in 1940. When Borah died, Church walked by the open coffin in the rotunda of the State Capitol. He stated that "Because he was a senator, I wanted to become one, too." Church graduated from Boise High School in 1942, where he served as student body president. As a junior in 1941, he won the American Legion National Oratorical Contest, which resulted in him receiving sufficient funds to provide for his four-year enrollment at Stanford University in California, where he joined the Theta Xi fraternity.

=== Military service and education ===
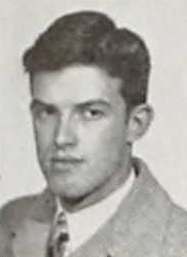
Church in the Stanford University yearbook, 1947

Church left Stanford in 1942, at the age of 18, and enlisted in the Army following the attack on Pearl Harbor. He was called up the following year and attended officer candidate training at Fort Benning in Georgia. He trained at Camp Ritchie, as one of the Ritchie Boys, and was commissioned a lieutenant on his 20th birthday. In the army, he served as a military intelligence officer in the China Burma India Theater. He was inducted to the Infantry Hall of Fame at Fort Benning. Following the end of the war, he was discharged in 1946.

In June 1947 he married Bethine Clark, daughter of Chase Clark, a former Democratic governor of Idaho and the federal judge for the state. The wedding took place at the secluded Robinson Bar Ranch (44.247°N 114.678°W), the Clark family's ranch in the mountains east of Stanley (and now owned by singer Carole King, since 1981). The two had a happy marriage and often showed their affection in public. He entered Harvard Law School that fall and after one year, Church transferred to Stanford Law School, when he thought the cold Massachusetts winter was the cause of a pain in his lower back. The pain did not go away and the problem was soon diagnosed as testicular cancer. After one of his testicles and glands in his lower abdomen were removed, Church was given only a few months to live. However, he rebounded from the illness after another doctor started X-ray treatments. This second chance led him to later reflect that "life itself is such a chancy proposition that the only way to live is by taking great chances." In 1950, Church graduated from Stanford Law School and returned to Boise to practice law and teach public speaking at Boise Junior College (now Boise State University).

Frank and Bethine Church had two sons, Frank Forrester Church IV, who died in 2009, and Chase Clark Church, who lives in Boise. Both boys were named for their grandfathers.

== Career ==
=== 1956 election ===
Following his return to Idaho, he became active in Democratic Party politics, and he became the chairman of the Young Democrats of Idaho. In 1952, he ran for a seat in the then-Republican dominated Idaho state legislature, but lost the election. In 1956, Church ran for the Class-3 Senate seat held by Herman Welker, who had alienated many Republicans for his opposition to President Dwight D. Eisenhower's programs and his alleged affiliation with McCarthyism. Church entered the primary race, which was described as "the most colorful primary in the history of the state". He faced a number of opponents, including Ricks College professor Claude Burtenshaw, bureaucrat Alvin McCormack, and former senator Glen H. Taylor.

When the primary came, Church won the Democratic nomination, with only 37.75% of the vote, narrowly edging out Taylor by 200 votes. Though Church won the nomination, Taylor refused to concede, and claimed a number of voting irregularities in the canvassing of the primary. During the general election campaign, Church and his campaign hit the road. Church shook around 75,000 hands over the entire course of the campaign. Church also conducted an astute campaign, by contrasting his fitness with that of Welker. His slogan, "Idaho Will Be Proud of Frank Church", was a major asset to his campaign. Church also campaigned on an internationalist plank, in favor of a publicly owned Hells Canyon Dam and was conservative on money matters.

This was in stark contrast to Welker's campaign, which focused heavily on anti-Communism, a decision that proved to be a weak political foundation. The Welker campaign also ran on his record, as well as the "Herman letter", in which President Eisenhower endorsed Welker's candidacy. Glen Taylor also ran in the general election as a write-in candidate, labeling Church as a candidate of the "corporate interests". Church won the race, defeating both Welker and Taylor, with a plurality of 46,315 votes. This was despite a number of factors that might have inhibited Church's campaign, including the Republican's fundraising advantage and Eisenhower's large victory in the presidential election.

=== First term (1957–1963) ===
Upon entering the Senate in January 1957, Church voted against a procedural motion on the Civil Rights Act of 1957 against the wishes of Democratic Majority Leader Lyndon B. Johnson. This angered Johnson, who punished Church by all but ignoring him for the next six months. However, Church managed to find his way into Johnson's good graces by voting for an amendment to the Civil Rights Act of 1957 that would grant the right to a trial by jury to anyone charged with violating the act. Church also added a provision to that amendment requiring that juries in such cases be desegregated. Johnson was so grateful he made the young Idahoan a veritable protégé, rewarding him with plum assignments, such as a seat on the prestigious Senate Foreign Relations Committee, a position which allowed Church to follow in the footsteps of his idol, William Borah. Recently declassified documents show that the young veteran also challenged his mentor, behind closed doors, after the 1964 Gulf of Tonkin incident, making this prescient warning: "In a democracy you cannot expect the people, whose sons are being killed and who will be killed, to exercise their judgment if the truth is concealed from them."

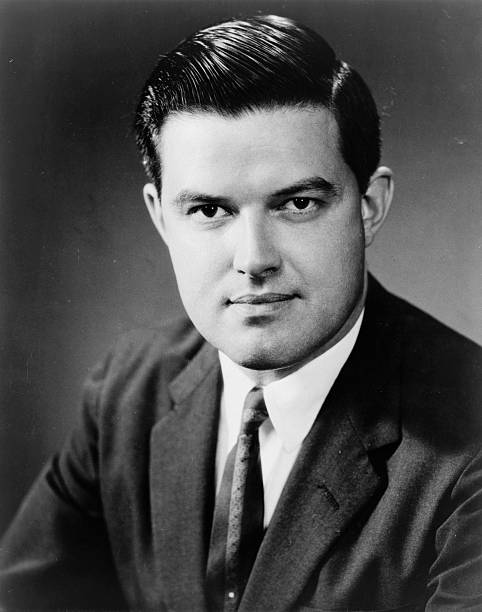
Church in 1961

He sat on the McClellan Committee (1957–60), which probed organized crime within trade unions. Church was reelected in 1962, defeating former state representative Jack Hawley. To date, he is the only Idaho Democrat to be popularly elected for more than one term in the Senate.

=== Attempted recall and election of 1968 ===
In 1967, a recall campaign was waged against Church by Ron Rankin, a Republican county commissioner in the northern Idaho county Kootenai who co-founded the Victory in Vietnam Committee to coordinate the recall. Rankin unsuccessfully sued Idaho's secretary of state to accept recall petitions. The U.S. District Court for Idaho ruled that the state's recall laws did not apply to U.S. senators and that such a recall would violate the U.S. Constitution. State attorney general Allan Shepard, a future chief justice of the state supreme court, agreed with the court's decision.

In the 1968 Senate election, Church won with over 60 percent of the vote against Republican challenger and U.S. Representative George V. Hansen, in contrast with the concurrent presidential election where Republican candidate Richard Nixon got nearly 57 percent of the popular vote in Idaho. James Risen attributes Church's victory to the 1967 recall effort backfiring: "Most Idaho voters were angered by the recall effort, and it generated sympathy for Church throughout the state."

=== Third term (1969–1975): Vietnam War and Church Committee ===
Church was a key figure in American foreign policy during the 1970s, and served as chairman of the Senate Committee on Foreign Relations from 1979 to 1981. Following the instinct that led him to ask questions early on (see above), Church was one of the first senators to publicly oppose the Vietnam War in the 1960s, although he had supported the conflict earlier. He was the co-author of two legislative efforts to curtail the war: the Cooper–Church Amendment of 1970, and the Case–Church Amendment of 1973.

In September 1970, Church announced on television and in speeches across the country that "the doves had won." Author David F. Schmitz states that Church based his assertion on the fact that two key propositions of the anti-war movement, "A negotiated peace and the withdrawal of American troops," were now official policy. The only debate that remained would be over when to withdraw, not whether to withdraw, and over the meaning of the war. Church concluded:

So the last service the doves can perform for their country, is to insist that President Nixon's withdrawal program truly leads to a "Vietnamization" of the war. It must not become a device for lowering—and then perpetuating—an American military presence in South Vietnam for the indefinite future. Our long ordeal in this mistaken war must end. The gathering crisis in our own land, the deepening divisions among our people, the festering, unattended problems here at home, bear far more importantly on the future of our Republic than anything we ever had at stake in Indochina.

Church argued that the opponents of the Vietnam War needed to prevent the corruption of the nation and its institutions. To Church, the anti-war opposition was the "highest concept of patriotism—which is not the patriotism of conformity—but the patriotism of Senator Carl Schurz, a dissenter from an earlier period, who proclaimed: 'Our country right or wrong. When right, to be kept right: when wrong, to be put right."

Church gained national prominence during his service in the Senate through his chairmanship of the U.S. Senate Select Committee to Study Governmental Operations with Respect to Intelligence Activities from 1975 through 1976, more commonly known as the Church Committee, which conducted extensive hearings investigating extra-legal FBI and CIA intelligence-gathering and covert operations. The committee investigated CIA drug smuggling activities in the Golden Triangle and secret U.S.-backed wars in Third World countries. Together with Senator Sam Ervin's committee inquiries, the Church Committee hearings laid the groundwork for the Foreign Intelligence Surveillance Act of 1978.

Daniel Ellsberg quoted Church as speaking of the NSA as follows: "I know the capacity that is there to make tyranny total in America, and we must see to it that this agency and all agencies that possess this technology operate within the law and under proper supervision, so that we never cross over that abyss. That is the abyss from which there is no return." More specifically on August 17, 1975, Senator Frank Church stated on NBC's "Meet the Press" without mentioning the name of the NSA about this agency:

In the need to develop a capacity to know what potential enemies are doing, the United States government has perfected a technological capability that enables us to monitor the messages that go through the air. These messages are between ships at sea, they could be between units, military units in the field. We have a very extensive capability of intercepting messages wherever they may be in the airwaves. Now, that is necessary and important to the United States as we look abroad at enemies or potential enemies. We must know, at the same time, that capability at any time could be turned around on the American people, and no American would have any privacy left such is the capability to monitor everything—telephone conversations, telegrams, it doesn't matter. There would be no place to hide.

If this government ever became a tyranny, if a dictator ever took charge in this country, the technological capacity that the intelligence community has given the government could enable it to impose total tyranny, and there would be no way to fight back because the most careful effort to combine together in resistance to the government, no matter how privately it was done, is within the reach of the government to know. Such is the capability of this technology.

Now why is this investigation important? I'll tell you why: because I don't want to see this country ever go across the bridge. I know the capacity that is there to make tyranny total in America, and we must see to it that this agency and all agencies that possess this technology operate within the law and under proper supervision so that we never cross over that abyss. That is the abyss from which there is no return.

==== NSA monitoring of Church's communications ====
In a secret operation code-named "Project Minaret," the National Security Agency (NSA) monitored the communications of leading Americans, including Senators Church and Howard Baker, Rev. Dr. Martin Luther King Jr., and others, including prominent U.S. journalists and athletes, who criticized the U.S. war in Vietnam. A review by NSA of the NSA's Minaret program concluded that Minaret was "disreputable if not outright illegal."

=== Environmental record and other issues ===
Church is also remembered for his voting record as a strong progressive and environmental legislator, and he played a major role in the creation of the nation's system of protected wilderness areas in the 1960s. In 1964, Church was the floor sponsor of the national Wilderness Act. In 1968, he sponsored the Wild and Scenic Rivers Act and gained passage of a ten-year moratorium on federal plans to transfer water from the Pacific Northwest to California. Working with other members of Congress from northwestern states, Church helped establish the Hells Canyon National Recreation Area along the Oregon–Idaho border, which protected the gorge from dam building. He was also the primary proponent in the establishment of the Sawtooth Wilderness and National Recreation Area in central Idaho in 1972.

Church also was instrumental in the creation of Idaho's River of No Return Wilderness Area in 1980, his final year in the Senate. This wilderness comprised the old Idaho Primitive Area, the Salmon River Breaks Primitive Area, plus additional lands. At 2.36 million acres (9,550 km^{2}), over 3,600 square miles (9,300 km^{2}), it is the largest wilderness area in the nation outside of Alaska. It was renamed the Frank Church-River of No Return Wilderness in 1984, shortly after the diagnosis of his pancreatic cancer. Idaho Senator Jim McClure introduced the measure in the Senate in late February, and President Reagan signed the act on March 14, less than four weeks before Frank Church's death on April 7.

Frank Church was considered a progressive (remarkable considering that he represented one of the most conservative states in the nation), though he was a strong opponent of gun control and was pro-life. In 1979, he was the first in Congress to disclose and protest the presence of Soviet combat troops in Cuba. According to the Christian Science Monitor, this stance somewhat disarmed his opponent's charge in the 1980 campaign that Church's performance on the Foreign Relations Committee had helped to weaken the US militarily. In 1974, Church joined Senator Frank Moss, D-Utah, to sponsor the first legislation to provide federal funding for hospice care programs. The bill did not have widespread support and was not brought to a vote. Congress finally included a hospice benefit in Medicare in 1982.

In late 1975 and early 1976, a sub-committee of the U.S. Senate led by Church concluded that members of the Lockheed board had paid members of friendly governments to guarantee contracts for military aircraft in a series of illegal bribes and contributions made by Lockheed officials from the late 1950s to the 1970s. In 1976, it was publicly revealed that Lockheed had paid $22 million in bribes to foreign officials in the process of negotiating the sale of aircraft including the F-104 Starfighter, the so-called "Deal of the Century."

Church also sponsored, along with Pennsylvania Republican John Heinz, the "conscience clause," which prohibited the government from requiring church-affiliated hospitals to perform abortions.

=== Late political career ===
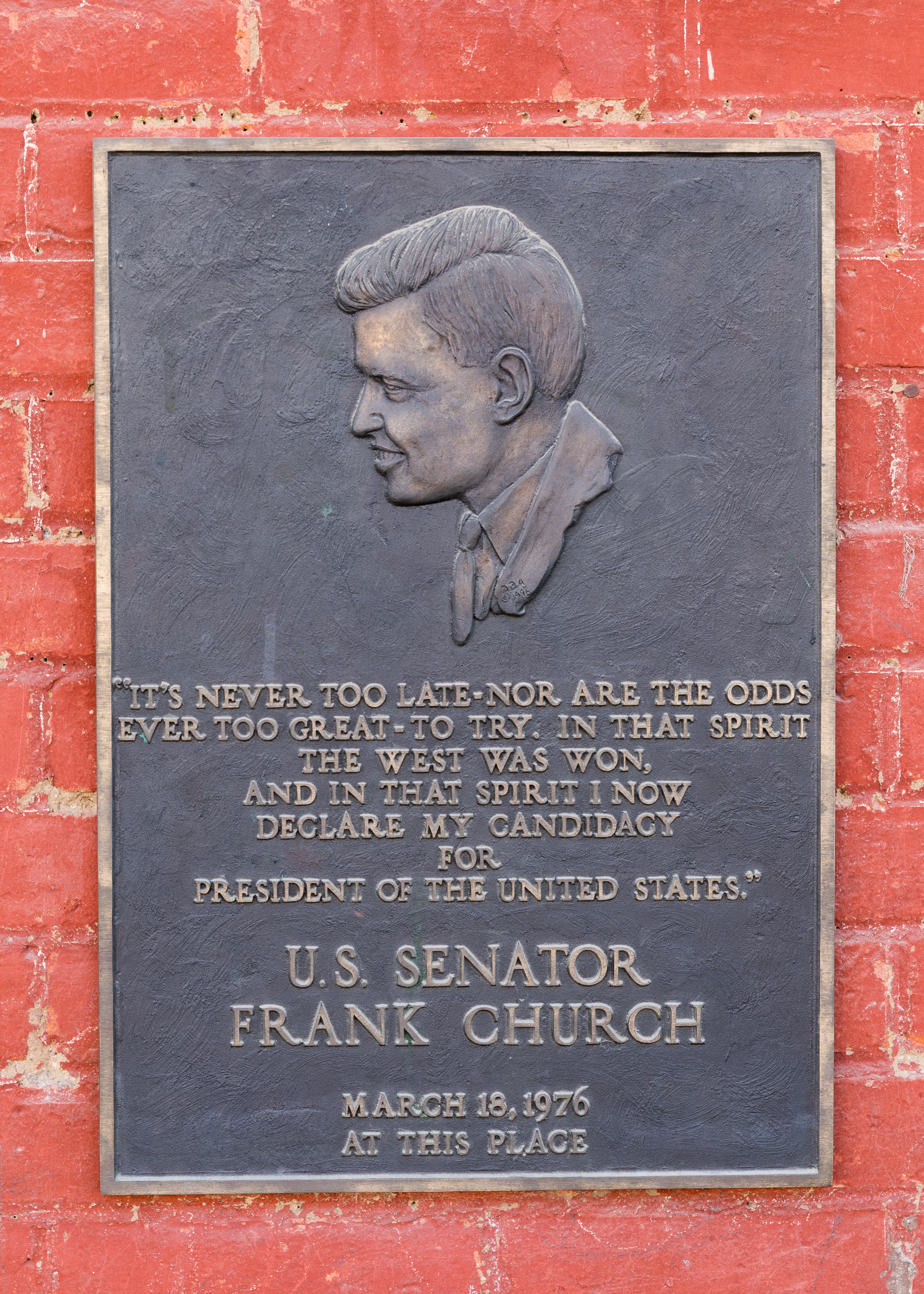
Commemorative plaque in Idaho City where Church announced his candidacy for the presidential election

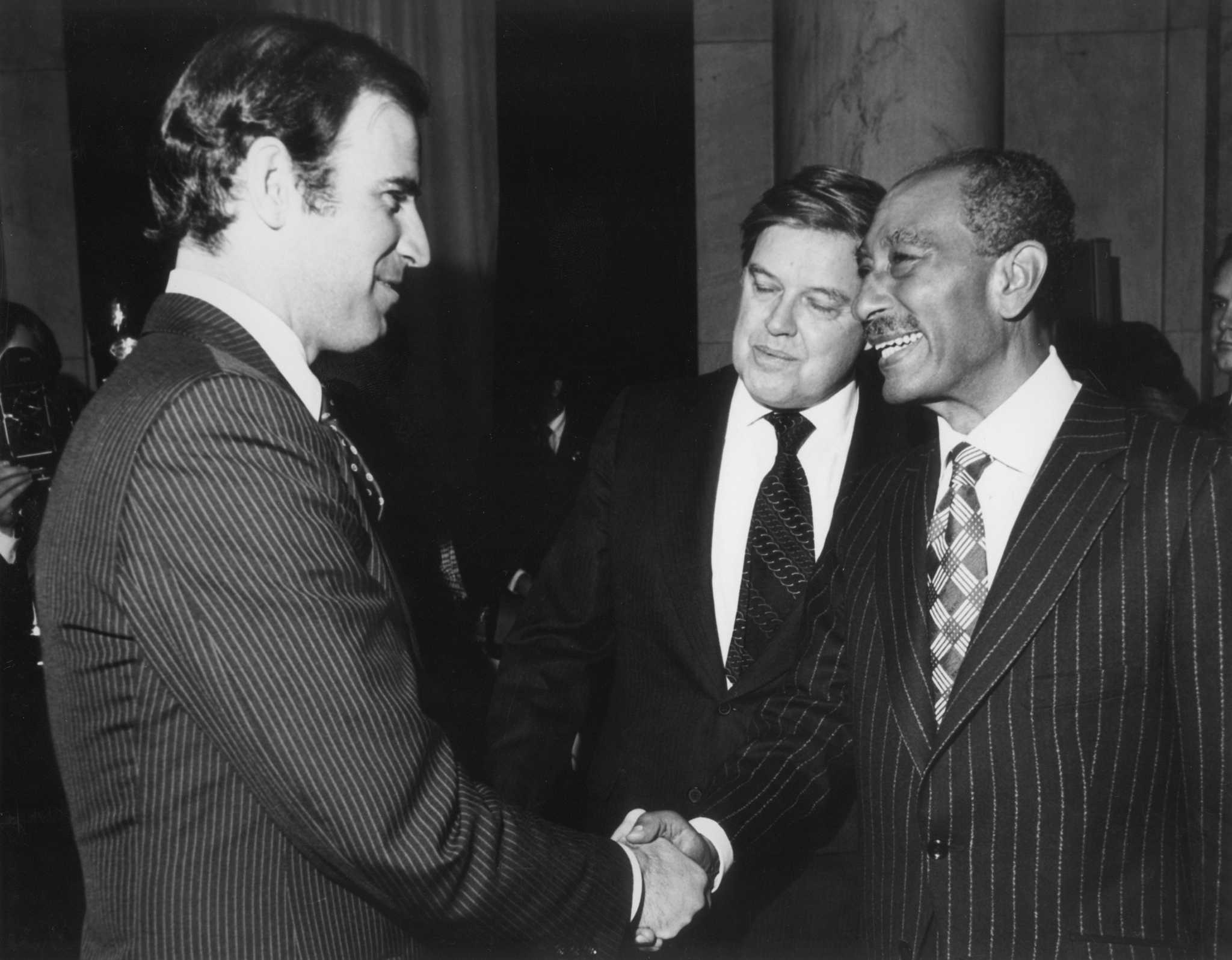
From left: Senator (and future Vice President and President) Joe Biden, Senator Frank Church and President of Egypt Anwar Sadat after signing Egyptian–Israeli Peace Treaty, 1979

In 1976, Church belatedly sought the Democratic nomination for president and announced his candidacy on March 18 from rustic Idaho City, his father's birthplace. Although he won primaries in Nebraska, Idaho, Oregon, and Montana, he withdrew in favor of the eventual nominee, former Georgia governor Jimmy Carter. Church remains the only Idahoan to win a major-party presidential primary election following the reforms of the McGovern–Fraser Commission. Prior to the primary elections of 1972, William Borah had won several contests in the 1936 Republican primaries.

By June, Carter had the nomination sufficiently locked up and could take time to interview potential vice-presidential candidates. The pundits predicted that Church would be tapped to provide balance as an experienced senator with strong liberal credentials. Church promoted himself, persuading friends to intervene with Carter on his behalf. If a quick choice had been required as in past conventions, Carter later recalled, he would probably have chosen Church. But the longer period for deliberation gave Carter time to worry about his compatibility with the publicity-seeking Church, who had a tendency to be long-winded. Instead, Carter invited Senators Edmund Muskie, John Glenn, and Walter Mondale to visit his home in Plains, Georgia, for personal interviews, while Church, Henry M. Jackson, and Adlai Stevenson III would be interviewed at the convention in New York. Of all the potential candidates, Carter found Mondale the most compatible. As a result, Carter selected Mondale as his running mate.

In the late 1970s, Church was a leading congressional supporter of the Torrijos-Carter Treaties, which proposed to return the Panama Canal to Panama. The scheme proved to be widely unpopular in Idaho, and led to the formation of the "Anybody But Church" (ABC) committee, created by the National Conservative Political Action Committee (NCPAC), based in Washington, D.C. ABC and NCPAC had no formal connection with the 1980 Senate campaign of conservative Republican congressman Steve Symms, which permitted them, under former Federal election law, to spend as much as they could raise to defeat Church.

Church lost his bid for a fifth term to Symms by less than one percent of the vote. His defeat was blamed on the activities of the Anybody But Church Committee and the national media's early announcement in Idaho of Republican presidential candidate Ronald Reagan's overwhelming win. These predictions were broadcast before polls closed statewide, specifically in the Pacific Time Zone in the north. Many believed that this caused many Democrats in the more politically moderate Idaho Panhandle to not vote at all. As of 2024, Church is the last Democrat to represent Idaho in the U.S. Senate.

=== Electoral history ===
U.S. Senate elections in Idaho (Class III): Results 1956–1980
Year	Democrat	Votes	Pct	Republican	Votes	Pct	3rd Party	Party	Votes	Pct
1956	Frank Church	149,096	56.2%	Herman Welker (inc.)	102,781	38.7%	Glen H. Taylor	Write-In	13,415	5.1%
1962	Frank Church (inc.)	141,657	54.7%	Jack Hawley	117,129	45.3%				
1968	Frank Church (inc.)	173,482	60.3%	George V. Hansen	114,394	39.7%				
1974	Frank Church (inc.)	145,140	56.1%	Bob Smith	109,072	42.1%	Jean L. Stoddard	American	4,635	1.8%
1980	Frank Church (inc.)	214,439	48.8%	Steve Symms	218,701	49.7%	Larry Fullmer	Libertarian	6,507	1.5%

Following his 24 years in the Senate, Church practiced international law with the Washington, D.C., firm of Whitman and Ransom, specializing in Asian issues.

== Death ==
Frank Forrester Church (1924-1984) gravestone in Morris Hill Cemetery, Boise, Idaho.

Three years after leaving the Senate, Church was hospitalized for a pancreatic tumor on January 12, 1984. Less than three months later, he died at his home in Bethesda, Maryland, on April 7 at age 59. A memorial service was held at the National Cathedral in Washington, D.C., and then his body was flown home to Idaho, where he lay in state beneath the rotunda of the Idaho State Capitol. His funeral was held in downtown Boise at the Cathedral of the Rockies on April 12 and televised throughout Idaho. Church was buried at Morris Hill Cemetery near his boyhood hero, Senator William Borah.

== Legacy ==
Church received an honorary doctorate from Pennsylvania's Elizabethtown College in 1983 to honor his work for the American people during his career in public office. His papers, originally given to his alma mater Stanford University in 1981, were transferred to Boise State University at his request in 1984.

As of 2024, Church remains the last Democrat to serve in the U.S. Senate from Idaho; his final election victory was in 1974, 52 years ago.

=== Warning about the NSA ===
Church was stunned by what the Church Committee learned about the immense operations and electronic monitoring capabilities of the National Security Agency (NSA), an agency whose existence was unknown to most Americans at the time. Church stated in 1975:

That capability at any time could be turned around on the American people, and no American would have any privacy left, such is the capability to monitor everything: telephone conversations, telegrams, it doesn't matter. There would be no place to hide.

He is widely quoted as also stating regarding the NSA:

I don't want to see this country ever go across the bridge... I know the capacity that is there to make tyranny total in America, and we must see to it that this agency and all agencies that possess this technology operate within the law and under proper supervision, so that we never cross over that abyss. That is the abyss from which there is no return.

Commentators such as Glenn Greenwald have praised Church for his prescient warning regarding this turning around by the NSA to monitor the American people, arguing that the NSA undertook such a turn in the years after the September 11 attacks.

== See also ==
- Case–Church Amendment
- Cooper–Church Amendment
- Frank Church High School – an alternative high school in Boise
- Frank Church—River of No Return Wilderness

== Notes ==
Party political offices
Preceded by David Worth Clark	Democratic nominee for U.S. Senator from Idaho (Class 3); 1956, 1962, 1968, 1974, 1980	Succeeded by John V. Evans
Preceded by Frank G. Clement	Keynote Speaker of the Democratic National Convention; 1960	Succeeded by John O. Pastore
Preceded by Mike Mansfield	Response to the State of the Union address 1972; Served alongside: Carl Albert, Lloyd Bentsen, Hale Boggs, John Brademas, Thomas Eagleton, Martha Griffiths, John Melcher, Ralph Metcalfe, William Proxmire, Leonor Sullivan	Vacant Title next held by Mike Mansfield
U.S. Senate
Preceded by Herman Welker	U.S. Senator (Class 3) from Idaho; 1957–1981; Served alongside: Henry Dworshak, Leonard B. Jordan, James A. McClure	Succeeded by Steve Symms
Preceded by John Sparkman	Chair of the Senate Foreign Relations Committee; 1979–1981	Succeeded by Charles H. Percy
Preceded by Harrison A. Williams	Chair of the Senate Aging Committee; 1971–1979	Succeeded by Lawton Chiles
New office	Chair of the Senate National Emergency Termination Committee; 1971–1975	Position abolished
New office	Chair of the Church Committee; 1975	Succeeded by Daniel Inouye as Chair of the Senate Intelligence Committee
Honorary titles
Preceded by Russell Long	Baby of the Senate; 1957–1961	Succeeded by John Tower
