= Ada County Highway District =

Government entity in Idaho, US

Agency overview
- Formed: 1971
- Jurisdiction: Government of Ada County, Idaho
- Headquarters: 3775 N Adams St, Garden City, ID 83714
- Website: https://achdidaho.org/

The Ada County Highway District (ACHD) is a countywide highway district in the U.S. state of Idaho. Located in Garden City, it is a government agency established in 1971 as an independent government entity.

== Overview ==
ACHD covers Ada County, including six cities within it (Boise, Garden City, Meridian, Eagle, Star, and Kuna). It is responsible for short-range planning, construction, and maintenance to Ada County's local roads and bridges (excluding state highways like Eagle Road, Interstate 84, the Connector and overpasses, which are operated by the Idaho Transportation Department).

The district maintains and operates approximately 2,100 miles (3,400 km) of roads and streets in Ada County with an estimated value of $3 billion. This infrastructure includes facilities that range from multi-lane, arterial streets with a computerized signal system, to narrow, farm-to-market roadways.

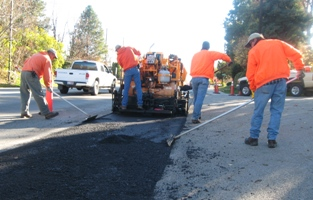
ACHD crews repair Overland Road in Boise

== Organization ==
ACHD is governed by five elected commissioners who each represent a subdistrict of Ada County. Together, they are responsible for guiding the planning, development and implementation of transportation facilities throughout the county. Elections are held every two years on a rotating basis.

Commissioners and staff host and attend meetings and public hearings to gather feedback from citizens. The commissioners also holds weekly public meetings at the district's headquarters, and participate in joint meetings with municipal and county officials.

An appointed director, who serves as chief administrator, manages the district on a day-to-day basis. The director is responsible for managing five departments: Administration, Engineering, Maintenance and Operations, Traffic, and Planning and Development, which combined total nearly 300 employees.

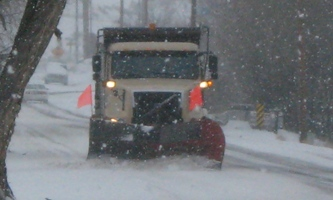
ACHD snow plow in Eagle, Idaho

== Budget ==
The ACHD's fiscal year begins October 1 and runs through the end of September.
