= Alameda, Idaho =

Town in Idaho

Coordinates: 42°53′24″N 112°27′15″W

Alameda was a city in the western United States, located in Bannock County, Idaho. It was established as a village in 1924 at the consolidation of the villages of Fairview and North Pocatello which were platted on the northern boundary of the town of Pocatello in 1911 and 1914 respectively. New commercial and residential development in Alameda occurred in part as a result of its proximity to Pocatello and to a greater degree its location on the Yellowstone Highway (later U.S. Route 91), one of Idaho's first designated highways. By 1930, the village exceeded its predecessor villages' 1920 population by 144%. In just under forty years of history, the village became Idaho's eleventh most populous city.

Historical population
Census	Pop.	Note	%±
1930	1,885		—
1940	3,224		71.0%
1950	4,744		47.1%
1960	10,660		124.7%

It was consolidated with Pocatello in 1962, with the support of its mayor, George Hansen, who later served seven terms as a congressman. Another nearby city, Chubbuck, opposed a similar merger and remained a separate municipality.

Among its other businesses, Alameda had four pharmacies: Grand Central Pharmacy (300 block of Jefferson), Poleline Drug (Poleline Road), Alameda Pharmacy (375 Yellowstone) and Hiway Drug (320 Yellowstone).

In the 1960 census, Alameda had a population of 10,660 and Pocatello was at 28,534; the consolidation made Pocatello the state's largest city based on those numbers, passing Boise and Idaho Falls.

== Climate ==
This climatic region is typified by large seasonal temperature differences, with warm to hot (and often humid) summers and cold (sometimes severely cold) winters. According to the Köppen Climate Classification system, Alameda has a humid continental climate, abbreviated "Dfb" on climate maps.

== See also ==
- Pocatello, Idaho
