= 1950 United States Senate special election in Idaho =

- November 7, 1950
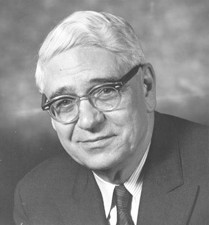

Nominee	Henry Dworshak	Claude J. Burtenshaw
Party	Republican	Democratic
Popular vote	104,608	97,092
Percentage	51.86%	48.14%
- County results Dworshak: 50–60% 60–70% Burtenshaw: 50–60% 60–70%
U.S. senator before election
Henry Dworshak
Republican
Elected U.S. Senator
Henry Dworshak
Republican

The 1950 United States Senate special election in Idaho took place on November 7, 1950. Incumbent Republican senator Henry Dworshak, who was appointed by governor C. A. Robins after the death of Bert H. Miller, won election to a partial (and second non-consecutive) term. Dworshak had previously lost re-election to Miller in 1948, but was appointed back to the seat after Miller died in office in October 1949.

== Primary elections ==
Primary elections were held on August 8, 1950.

=== Democratic primary ===
==== Candidates ====
- Claude J. Burtenshaw, teacher
- Edwin M. Holden, chief justice of the Idaho Supreme Court
- Francis M. Bistline, former Speaker of the Idaho House of Representatives
- Robert L. Summerfield
- LaVera Swope

==== Results ====
Democratic primary results
Party	Candidate	Votes	%
Democratic	Claude J. Burtenshaw	17,690	27.94
Democratic	Edwin M. Holden	14,006	22.13
Democratic	Robert L. Summerfield	13,759	21.73
Democratic	Francis M. Bistline	10,027	15.84
Democratic	LaVera Swope	7,822	12.36
Total votes		63,304	

=== Republican primary ===
==== Candidates ====
- Henry Dworshak, appointed incumbent U.S. Senator
- Abe McGregor Goff, former U.S. Representative for Idaho's 1st congressional district (1947-1949)
- Fentress Kuhn

==== Results ====
Republican primary results
Party	Candidate	Votes	%
Republican	Henry Dworshak (incumbent)	37,298	58.51
Republican	Abe McGregor Goff	19,789	31.04
Republican	Fentress Kuhn	6,659	10.45
Total votes		63,746	

== General election ==
=== Results ===
1950 United States Senate special election in Idaho
Party	Candidate	Votes	%
Republican	Henry Dworshak (incumbent)	104,608	51.86
Democratic	Claude J. Burtenshaw	97,092	48.14
Majority		7,516	3.72
Turnout		201,700	34.27
Republican hold			

== See also ==
- 1950 United States Senate elections
