= 1974 United States Senate election in Idaho =

- November 5, 1974
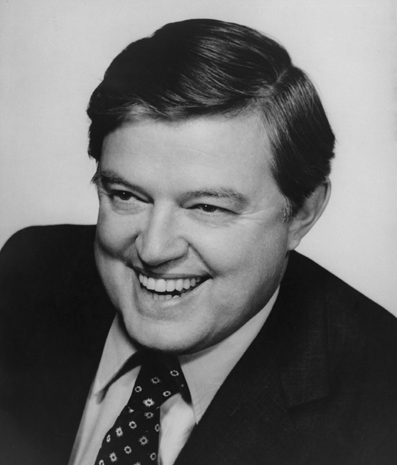

Nominee	Frank Church	Bob Smith
Party	Democratic	Republican
Popular vote	145,140	109,072
Percentage	56.07%	42.14%
- County results Church: 40–50% 50–60% 60–70% 70–80% Smith: 50–60% 60–70%
U.S. senator before election
Frank Church
Democratic
Elected U.S. Senator
Frank Church
Democratic

The 1974 United States Senate election in Idaho took place on Tuesday, November 5. Democratic incumbent Frank Church was re-elected to a fourth term in office, defeating Republican Bob Smith.

Church announced his presidential campaign in March 1976, off the strength of his victory as well as his high-profile chairmanship of the select Church Commission investigating American intelligence activity.

As of 2026, this was the last time the Democrats won a U.S. Senate election in Idaho.

== Primary elections ==
The primary was held on Tuesday, August 6.

=== Democratic primary ===
==== Candidates ====
- Frank Church, Boise, incumbent since 1957
- Leon Olson, Boise

==== Results ====
Democratic primary results
Party	Candidate	Votes	%
Democratic	Frank Church (incumbent)	53,659	85.77%
Democratic	Leon Olson	8,904	14.23%
Total votes		62,563	100.00%

=== Republican primary ===
==== Candidates ====
- Charles Bolstridge, Nampa
- Bob Smith, Nampa, attorney
- Donald L. Winder, Boise

==== Results ====
Republican primary results
Party	Candidate	Votes	%
Republican	Bob Smith	45,553	71.98%
Republican	Donald L. Winder	13,406	21.18%
Republican	Charles Bolstridge	4,331	6.84%
Total votes		63,290	100.00%

== General election ==
Democratic candidates did extraordinarily well in 1974, in response to the Watergate scandal. This was true even in Republican-leaning states and districts, leading commentators to call Church and other Democratic candidates elected that year "Watergate babies."

=== Results ===
1974 United States Senate election in Idaho
Party	Candidate	Votes	%	±%
Democratic	Frank Church (incumbent)	145,140	56.07%	▼4.19
Republican	Bob Smith	109,072	42.14%	▲2.40
American Independent	Jean L. Stoddard	4,635	1.79%	N/A
Majority		36,068	13.93%	−6.59%
Total votes		258,847	100.00%	+10.09%
Democratic hold				

== See also ==
- 1974 United States Senate elections
