= John C. Sanborn =

American politician

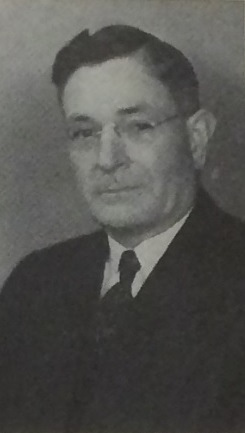

Member of the U.S. House of Representatives from Idaho's 2nd district
- In office January 3, 1947 – January 3, 1951
- Preceded by: Henry Dworshak
- Succeeded by: Hamer H. Budge

Member of the Idaho Senate
- In office 1939–1941

Member of the Idaho House of Representatives
- In office 1921–1929

Personal details
- Born: John Carfield Sanborn; September 28, 1885 Chenoa, Illinois
- Died: May 16, 1968 (aged 82) Boise, Idaho
- Resting place: Hagerman Cemetery; Hagerman, Idaho
- Party: Republican
- Spouse(s): Jessie Margaret McNabb Sanborn (1887–1955) (m. 1912–1955, her death)
- Parent(s): Orville D. Sanborn; Frances (Carfield) Sanborn
- Education: Oberlin College, 1908; Columbia Law School, 1912
- Profession: Agriculture

John Carfield Sanborn (September 28, 1885 – May 16, 1968), Idaho) was a congressman from southern Idaho. Sanborn served as a Republican in the House for two terms, from 1947 to 1951.

Born in Chenoa, Illinois, Sanborn was the son of Orville D. Sanborn and Frances (Carfield) Sanborn. He graduated from Oberlin College in Ohio in 1908 and the Columbia Law School in New York City in 1912.

Sanborn moved west and engaged in agricultural pursuits in Hagerman, Idaho. He was a trustee of the local school district and served in both houses of the state legislature: House (1921–1929) and Senate (1939–1941). In 1942 he sought the Republican nomination for the United States Senate and received 19% of the primary vote. Two years later he took the nomination for lieutenant governor but lost the election. Following World War II, he ran for the U.S. House in a district whose Republican incumbent contested for the U.S. Senate. Sanborn was elected to the state's 2nd district in 1946 and re-elected in 1948. Opting for the Senate instead of continuing in the House, he was a candidate for it in 1950 and 1956 but was defeated both times in the Republican primary by Herman Welker. He also entered the 1954 gubernatorial primary, won by Robert Smylie. At age 76, he ran for the 2nd district seat again in 1962, but lost a runoff in the GOP primary to Orval Hansen. His persistent candidacies may have been due to his concern about communist threats, both external and internal.

A Methodist, Sanborn was the last non-Mormon to represent Idaho's 2nd district in Congress. The successor to his open seat, Republican Hamer H. Budge, was the first Mormon to represent Idaho in either house of Congress. For 35 consecutive elections, 1950 through 2024, the 2nd district winner has been a member of the Church of Jesus Christ of Latter-day Saints.

U.S. House elections (Idaho's 2nd district): Results 1946–1948
Year	Democrat	Votes	Pct	Republican	Votes	Pct	3rd Party	Party	Votes	Pct
1946	Pete Leguiniche	41,231	39.3%	John Sanborn	63,692	60.7%				
1948	Asael Lyman	59,006	48.5%	John Sanborn (inc.)	61,690	50.7%	C.W. "Babe" Dill	Progressive	954	0.8%

Sanborn died in Boise in 1968 at age 82 and was buried in Hagerman.

U.S. House of Representatives
Preceded by Henry Dworshak	Member of the U.S. House of Representatives from Idaho's 2nd congressional district January 3, 1947–January 3, 1951	Succeeded by Hamer H. Budge
