= Jack Hawley =

American politician

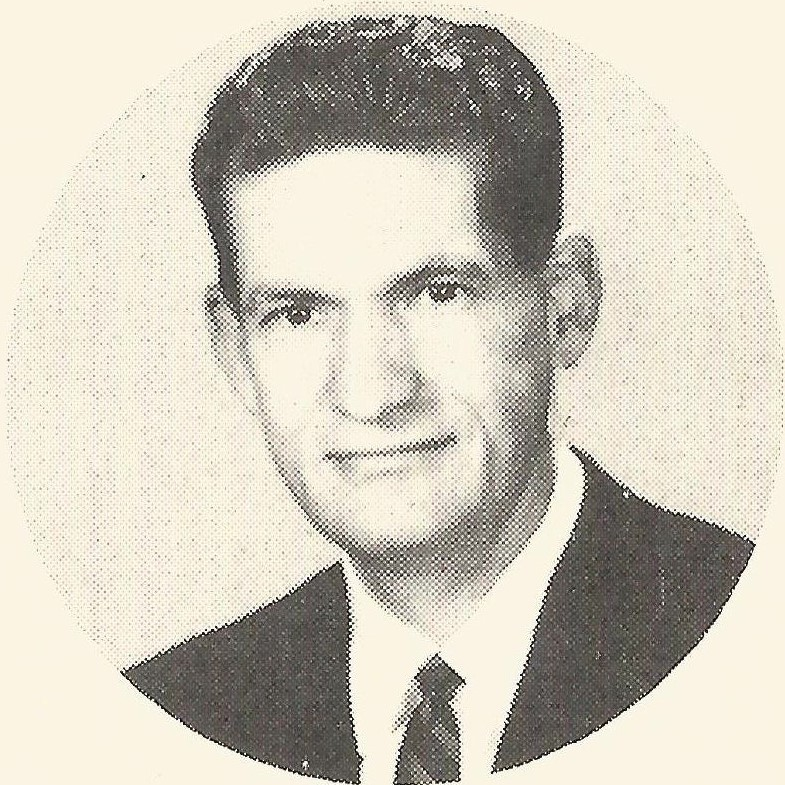

Member of the Idaho House of Representatives from Ada County
- In office January 5, 1953 – January 3, 1955
- Preceded by: Frank Chalfant
- Succeeded by: Carl Burt

Personal details
- Born: John Thomas Hawley; June 16, 1920 Boise, Idaho, U.S.
- Died: December 20, 1999 (aged 79) Boise, Idaho, U.S.
- Party: Republican
- Education: University of Idaho (BA)

John Thomas Hawley (June 16, 1920 – December 20, 1999) was an attorney and Republican politician from Idaho. Hawley was the 1962 nominee for the United States Senate seat, winning the June primary over George Hansen, but was defeated by Democratic incumbent Frank Church in November.

Prior to his Senate run, Hawley served in the state legislature as a one-term member of the Idaho House (1953–55). He was also the First Assistant U.S. Attorney for Idaho, a graduate of the University of Idaho in Moscow, a World War II combat veteran, and the grandson of Gov. James H. Hawley.

Hawley graduated high school from St. Teresa's Academy in Boise, attended the College of Idaho in Caldwell, and was a member of Beta Theta Pi fraternity.

After a battle with leukemia, Hawley died at age 79 in 1999 at his home in Boise.

== Election result ==
U.S. Senate election in Idaho (Class III): 1962
Year	Democrat	Votes	Pct	Republican	Votes	Pct
1962	Frank Church (inc.)	141,657	54.7%	Jack Hawley	117,129	45.3%

Idaho House of Representatives
Preceded by Frank E. Chalfant	Idaho Representative for Ada County; 1953–1955	Succeeded by Carl R. Burt
Party political offices
Preceded by Herman Welker	Republican Party nominee, U.S. Senator (Class 3) from Idaho; 1962 (lost)	Succeeded by George V. Hansen
