= Bert H. Miller =

American judge (1876–1949)

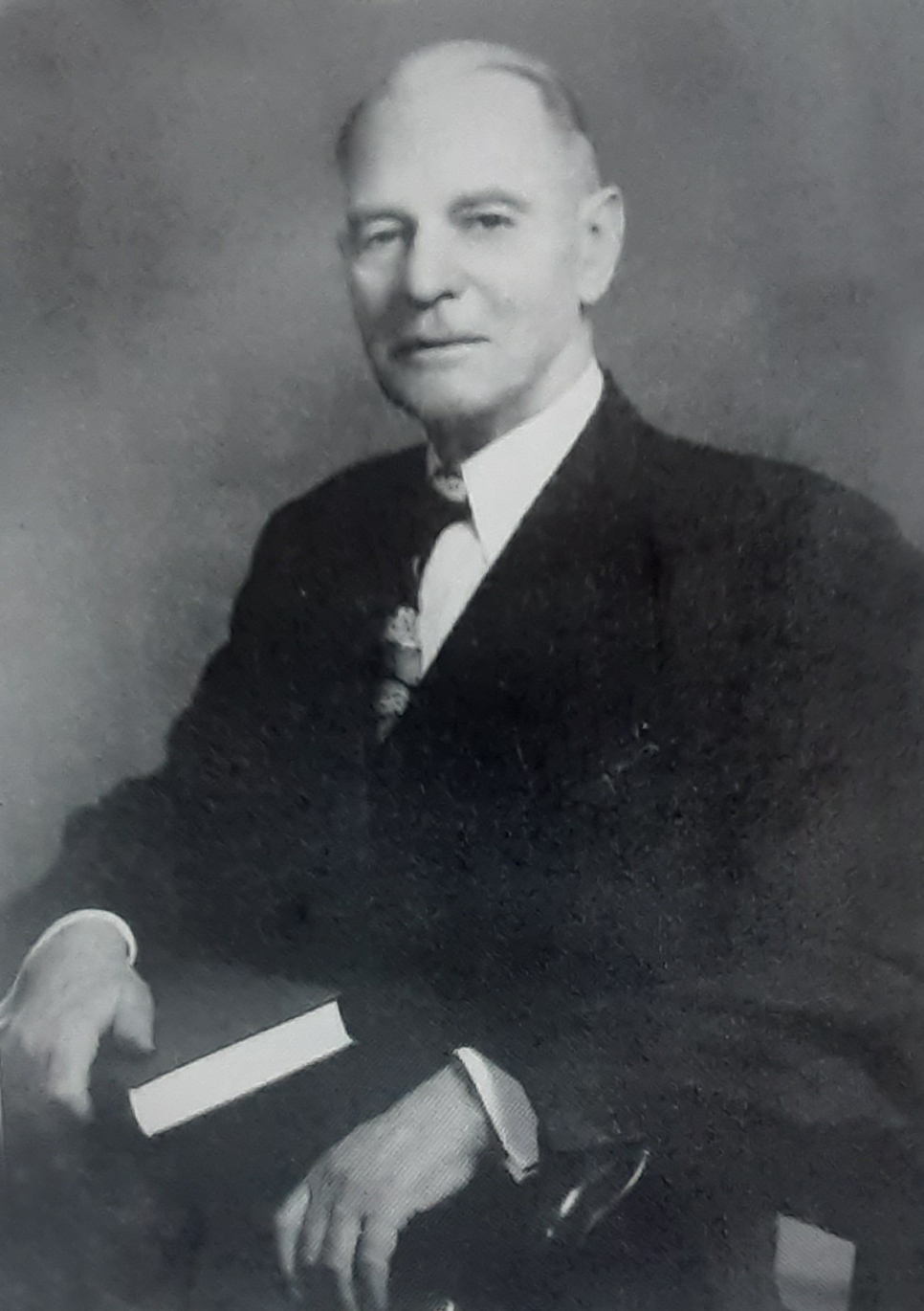

United States Senator from Idaho
- In office January 3, 1949 – October 8, 1949
- Preceded by: Henry Dworshak
- Succeeded by: Henry Dworshak

Justice of the Idaho Supreme Court
- In office 1945 – 1948
- Preceded by: S. Ben Dunlap
- Succeeded by: C.J. Taylor

Attorney General of Idaho
- In office January 2, 1933 – January 3, 1937
- Governor: C. Ben Ross
- Preceded by: Fred J. Babcock
- Succeeded by: J. W. Taylor
- In office January 6, 1941 – January 3, 1945
- Governor: Chase A. Clark; C. A. Bottolfsen
- Preceded by: J. W. Taylor
- Succeeded by: Frank Langley

Personal details
- Born: December 15, 1876 St. George, Utah Territory
- Died: October 8, 1949 (aged 72) Washington, D.C.
- Resting place: Morris Hill Cemetery; Boise, Idaho
- Party: Democratic
- Spouse(s): Carolyn Hopkins Miller (1887–1984) (m. 1916–1949, his death)
- Children: Lee Francis Miller; Patricia Ann Miller Hawley
- Education: Brigham Young University; Cumberland Law School
- Profession: Attorney

Bert Henry Miller (December 15, 1876 – October 8, 1949) was an American politician from Idaho and a member of the Democratic Party.

== Biography ==
=== Early life ===
Born in St. George, Utah Territory, Miller graduated from Brigham Young University in 1901 and from Cumberland School of Law at Cumberland University in Lebanon, Tennessee in 1902. He was admitted to the bar and commenced practice in St. Anthony, Idaho in 1903, and was prosecuting attorney of Fremont County from 1912 to 1914.

=== Political career ===
Miller ran unsuccessfully for the U.S. House of Representatives in 1914. He was elected state attorney general in 1932, and reelected in 1934. He was an unsuccessful candidate for the Democratic gubernatorial nomination in 1936, and served for two months in 1938 as Idaho's labor commissioner. Miller was an unsuccessful Democratic candidate for election in 1938 in the second district to the Seventy-sixth Congress, then was an attorney in the Wage and Hour Division of the U.S. Labor Department at Seattle, Washington in 1939 and 1940.

He again became state attorney general from 1940 to 1944, during which time he was an advocate for Japanese-American internment camps. Miller "expressed an even more extreme view, advocating that they be put into concentration camps for the remainder of the war and that no attempt be made to provide work for them. Their labor was not needed, he said, and after the war they should be sent back to California: 'We want to keep this a white man's country.' He was elected a justice of the state's supreme court in 1944.

=== U. S. Senator and death ===
Miller was elected to the United States Senate in 1948, defeating Republican incumbent Henry Dworshak by 3,132 votes, but died of a heart attack after only nine months in office. Governor C. A. Robins appointed Dworshak to succeed him. As of 2020, Miller remains the last Democrat to hold the Class II U.S. Senate seat from Idaho.

Miller's funeral was in Idaho at the state capitol, with burial at Morris Hill Cemetery in Boise.

== Congressional elections ==
=== House ===
U.S. House elections (Idaho's 2nd district): Results 1938
Year	Democrat	Votes	Pct	Republican	Votes	Pct
1938	Bert H. Miller	47,199	46.4%	Henry Dworshak	54,527	53.6%

=== Senate ===
U.S. Senate elections in Idaho (Class II): Results 1948
Year	Democrat	Votes	Pct	Republican	Votes	Pct
1948	Bert H. Miller	107,000	50.0%	Henry Dworshak (inc.)	103,868	48.5%

== See also ==
- List of members of the United States Congress who died in office (1900–1949)

Legal offices
Preceded by Fred J. Babcock	Attorney General of Idaho; January 2, 1933–January 3, 1937	Succeeded by J. W. Taylor
Preceded by J. W. Taylor	Attorney General of Idaho; January 6, 1941–January 3, 1945	Succeeded by Frank Langley
Party political offices
Preceded by George E. Donart	Democratic Party nominee, U.S. Senator (Class 2) from Idaho; 1948 (won)	Succeeded by Claude J. Burtenshaw
U.S. Senate
Preceded by Henry Dworshak	U.S. senator (Class 2) from Idaho; January 3, 1949–October 8, 1949; Served alongside: Glen H. Taylor	Succeeded by Henry Dworshak
