= Red Sox–Yankees rivalry =

Major League Baseball rivalry

- Fenway Park video board during a Red Sox and Yankees game in 2014

- Boston Red Sox New York Yankees
- Location: Northeastern United States
- First meeting: May 7, 1903; Huntington Avenue Grounds, Boston, Massachusetts; Americans 6, Highlanders 2 (Note: The New York Yankees were known as the New York Highlanders from 1903 to 1912, the Boston Red Sox were known as Boston Americans from 1901 to 1907.)
- Latest meeting: September 30, 2026; Yankees 9, Red Sox 2 Yankee Stadium, New York, New York
- Next meeting: June 4, 2027; Fenway Park, Boston, Massachusetts
- Stadiums: Red Sox: Fenway Park; Yankees: Yankee Stadium

Statistics
- Total meetings: 2,342
- All-time series: Yankees, 1,272–1,056–14 (.546)
- Regular season series: Yankees, 1,256–1,043–14 (.546)
- Postseason results: Yankees, 16–13 (.552)
- Largest victory: Yankees, 22–1 (June 19, 2000); Red Sox, 17–1 (May 28, 2005; July 15, 2005); 19–3 (July 25, 2019)
- Longest win streak: Yankees, 12 (May 27 – August 23, 1936; August 16, 1952 – April 23, 1953; September 7, 2019 – September 19, 2020); Red Sox, 17 (October 3, 1911 – July 1, 1912)
- Current win streak: Yankees, 2

Post-season history
- 1999 AL Championship Series: Yankees won, 4–1; 2003 AL Championship Series: Yankees won, 4–3; 2004 AL Championship Series: Red Sox won, 4–3; 2018 AL Division Series: Red Sox won, 3–1; 2021 AL Wild Card Game: Red Sox won; 2025 AL Wild Card Series: Yankees won, 2–1; 2026 AL Wild Card Series: Yankees won, 2–0

Locations of the Boston Red Sox and New York Yankees

The Red Sox–Yankees rivalry is a Major League Baseball (MLB) rivalry between the Boston Red Sox and the New York Yankees. Both teams have competed in MLB's American League (AL) for over 120 seasons, and have developed what many consider the fiercest rivalry in American sports. Nicknamed "The Rivalry" by some, the 1919 sale of star Red Sox player Babe Ruth to the Yankees popularized one of the most well-known aspects of the rivalry: a superstition known as the "Curse of the Bambino", attributed to Boston’s 86-year World Series drought which began upon Ruth’s sale to New York. Coincidentally, when the Red Sox broke the curse by winning the 2004 World Series, they defeated the Yankees in the ALCS after overcoming a 3–0 deficit.

The rivalry is often a heated subject of conversation, especially in the home region of both teams, the Northeastern United States. Until 2014, every MLB postseason featured one or both teams beginning with the inception of the wild card format and resultant additional Division Series in 1995, when both teams were assigned to the American League’s East Division. The Red Sox and the Yankees have faced each other three times in the ALCS, with the Yankees winning twice, in 1999 and 2003, and the Red Sox winning in 2004. The two teams have also met once in the American League Division Series (ALDS), in 2018, with Boston winning 3–1, a series which included a 16–1 Red Sox win in Game 3 at Yankee Stadium, the largest margin of defeat in a postseason game in the Yankees' history. The Red Sox beat the Yankees in the 2021 American League Wild Card Game, while most recently the Yankees beat the Red Sox in the 2025 American League Wild Card Series and 2026 American League Wild Card Series. Across the two series, the Red Sox endured a record 26⅔-inning postseason scoreless streak against the Yankees, the longest playoff scoring drought in Major League Baseball history.

In addition, the teams have twice met in the last regular-season series to decide the AL pennant, in 1904 (when the Red Sox, then known as the Americans, won) and 1949 (when the Yankees won).

The Yankees and the Red Sox finished tied for first in 1978; subsequently, the Yankees won a high-profile tie-breaker game for the division title. The first-place tie came after the Red Sox had a 14-game lead over the Yankees more than halfway through the season. Similarly, in the 2004 ALCS, the Yankees ultimately lost a best-of-seven series after leading 3–0. The Red Sox comeback was the only time in American baseball history that a team has come back from a 3–0 deficit to win a series. The Red Sox went on to win the World Series, ending the 86-year-old curse.

This match-up is regarded by some sports journalists as the greatest rivalry in sports. Games between the two teams often generate considerable interest and receive extensive media coverage, including being broadcast on national television. National carriers of Major League Baseball coverage, including Fox/FS1, ESPN, and MLB Network carry most of the games in the rivalry across the nation, regardless of team standings or playoff implications. Yankees–Red Sox games are some of the most-watched MLB games each season. Outside of baseball, the rivalry has led to violence between fans, along with attention from politicians and other athletes.

== Background ==
Boston and New York City have shared a rivalry as cities since before the American Revolution. For more than a century after its founding, Boston was arguably the educational, cultural, artistic, and economic power in the United States. Its location as a close American port to Europe and its concentration of elite schools and manufacturing hubs helped maintain this position for several decades. During this time period, New York was often looked down upon as the upstart, over-populated, dirty cousin to aristocratic and clean Boston.

In the 19th century, however, New York's economic power outpaced Boston's, fueled by possession of the terminus of the Erie Canal, which spurred massive growth in the manufacturing, shipping, insurance and financial services businesses. Another factor was its more rapid population expansion compared to that of Boston, driven by the growth of these industries, by New York's popularity as an immigration port of entry, and enhanced by a larger population base, even prior to the construction of the Canal – on the eve of the Revolution, New York, with 30,000 people, had nearly twice the population of Boston, with about 16,000. By the start of the 20th century the original dynamic, centered on Boston, had completely shifted as New York, particularly Wall Street, became the financial center of both the United States and the world.

The cities even played two different versions of early baseball. The "Massachusetts Game," as it was called, was played on a field with four bases and with home plate in the middle; whereas, the "New York Game," popularized by the New York Knickerbocker Club, was played on a diamond with three bases. The "New York Game" spread throughout the nation after the American Civil War and became the foundation for the modern game of baseball.

== Red Sox' early success ==
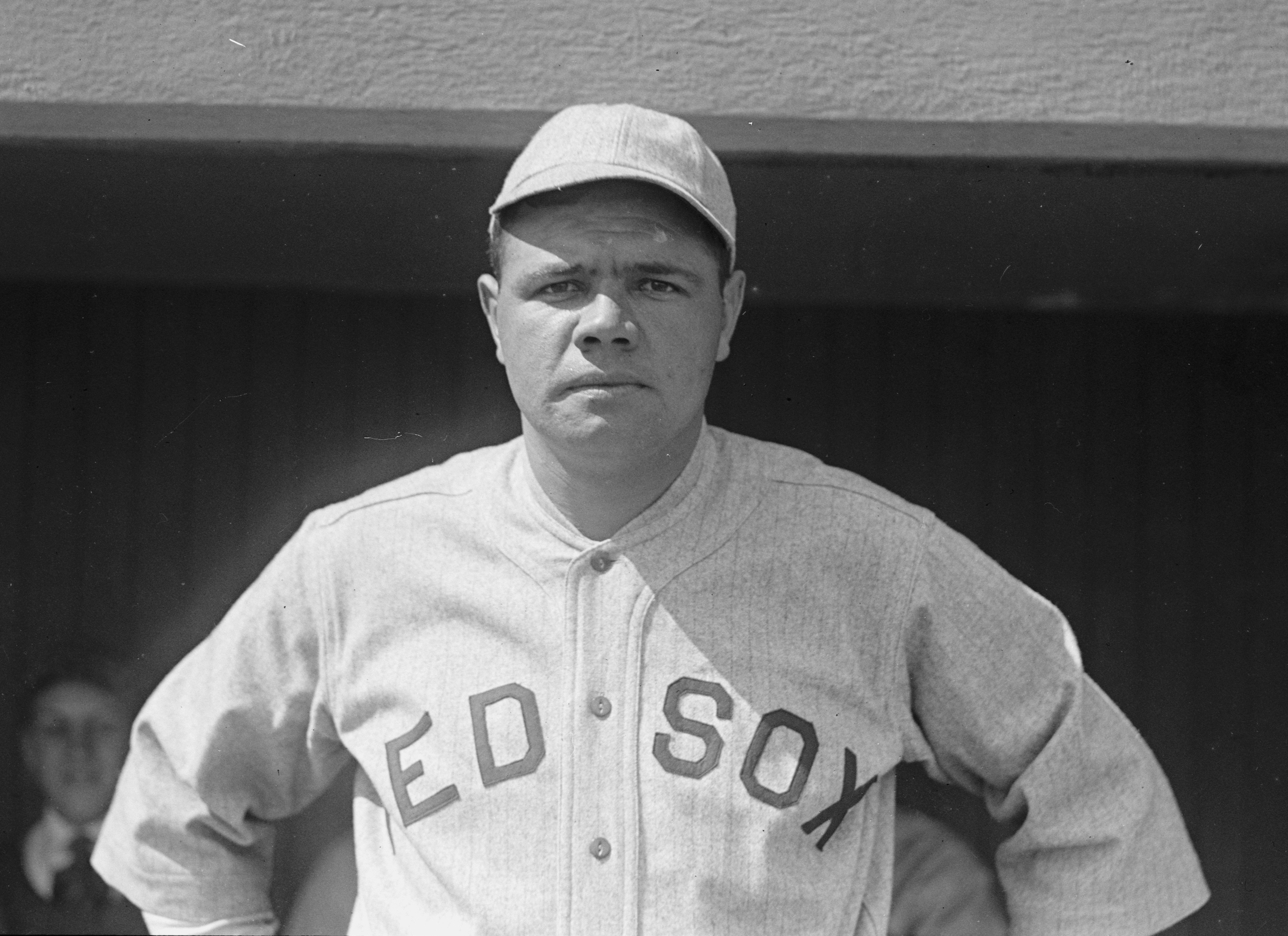
Babe Ruth, prior to his trade to the Yankees

The Red Sox were one of the most successful teams in baseball from 1901 to 1918. They won the inaugural World Series in 1903 (as the Boston Americans; the team changed its name to Red Sox in 1908) and four more between 1912 and 1918. The Yankees were founded in 1903 after franchise rights were purchased from the defunct Baltimore Orioles (as the New York Highlanders, in reference to playing games in the Washington Heights neighborhood of Manhattan.) The two teams had their first meeting in Boston on May 7, 1903. The game was marked by a fight when Boston pitcher George Winter was knocked down. Boston would eventually go on to win the pennant and the inaugural 1903 World Series. The 1904 season featured the teams facing each other on opening day. Later in the season, the Highlanders, led by pitcher Jack Chesbro in his record-setting 41 game-winning season, met the Boston Americans in the season's final game to decide the American League pennant winner. Chesbro threw a wild pitch in the top of the ninth inning, allowing the winning run to score from third base, and Boston won the game, and the pennant. The New York Giants, who had already clinched the National League pennant, refused to play in the 1904 World Series because of a perception of the "Junior Circuit" as being inferior (and because of alleged animosity between American League founder and first president, Ban Johnson, and the hierarchy of the Giants, owner John T. Brush and his team's Hall of Fame coach, player-manager John McGraw); thus, there was no World Series that year. Not until 2004 would the Red Sox again defeat the Yankees in a title-deciding game.

On April 11, 1912, the Highlanders debuted their pinstripes in a game against Boston, by then known as the Red Sox. Nine days later, Boston opened Fenway Park with a game against the Highlanders, who had left their home field of Hilltop Park to play in the newly rebuilt Polo Grounds; soon thereafter, in 1913, the team dropped the nickname Highlanders in favor of Yankees.

Six years later, the Chicago Cubs scored two runs off of Babe Ruth in game 4 of the Series, snapping his then record World Series scoreless inning streak at 29 2/3 innings. The Red Sox won the game, 3–2, and went on to capture their fifth Series title, their third in four years, and fourth in seven years.

The Yankees would however receive one notable moment of glory against the Red Sox during this era. On April 24, 1917, Yankees pitcher George Mogridge threw a no-hitter at Fenway Park, the first in the ballpark's history and first in Yankees history.

== "The Curse of the Bambino" ==
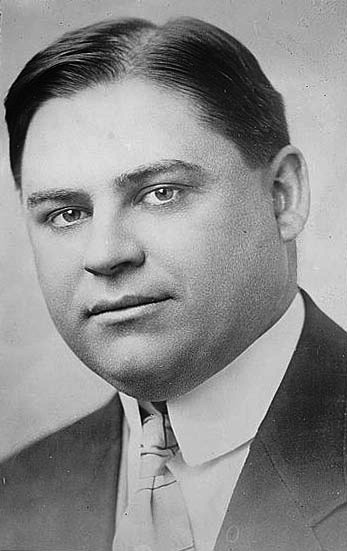
Harry Frazee, the owner of the Red Sox, sold Ruth to the Yankees. This began the "Curse of the Bambino".

In 1916, Broadway producer Harry Frazee purchased the Red Sox, on credit, for $500,000. Frazee lost his patience with Ruth despite the latter's success with the Red Sox, as Ruth had threatened to hold out for a larger contract and become a distraction. After the Red Sox finished sixth in the American League in 1919, Frazee, needing money to finance a Broadway musical, often said to be No, No Nanette (the success of that 1925 play is actually what paid off the loan). However, Ruth was sold to the Yankees in 1919, and "No, No Nanette" was produced by Frazee in 1925. Frazee received $125,000 and a loan of $300,000 – secured on Fenway Park – for Ruth, despite Ruth having set the record for home runs with 29 in 1919. This began a series of deals with the Yankees that resulted in a long period of mediocrity for the Red Sox while the Yankees began their dynasty.

Ruth's arrival in New York simultaneously launched the Yankees dynasty while ravaging the Red Sox. While the Red Sox' five World Series titles were a record at the time, 1918 would be the team's last championship for 86 years. The Yankees then created the greatest dynasty and team in baseball history. Meanwhile, Ruth's home run-hitting prowess anchored the Yankees line-up, which became known as "Murderers' Row" in the late 1920s. The Yankees reached the World Series seven times during Ruth's New York years, winning four. This abrupt reversal of fortunes for the Red Sox marked the beginning of the supposed "Curse of the Bambino." But it was not the Ruth deal alone that reversed the fortunes of both clubs. Frazee also sold many other players to the Yankees.

Robert W. Creamer reported that "[the] loan was made and relations between the two clubs continued to be cordial, with Frazee sending player after player to the Yankees over the next few seasons for more and more cash. This was no accident. Frazee and Yankees owner Tillinghast L'Hommedieu Huston were friends, and American League president Ban Johnson's attempts to drive Frazee out of the game had caused the five teams loyal to Johnson to make no deals with the Red Sox as long as Frazee owned the club, leaving only the Yankees and White Sox as trading partners. When the White Sox' reputation was destroyed in the Black Sox Scandal, Frazee's only option for trades was to deal with the Yankees. The Red Sox soon became a baseball disaster area, finishing dead last nine times in eleven seasons."

Among others, Wally Schang, Everett Scott, Carl Mays, Waite Hoyt, Joe Bush and Sam Jones went from the Sox to the Yankees in the next one to three years, along with Ed Barrow, the former Red Sox manager who became the Yankees' general manager and empire-builder for the first quarter-century of the Yankees' dynasty. Scott, a former Red Sox team captain, actually took the reins as Yankees captain from Ruth when he arrived; in doing so, he became the only player in history to be named captain for both teams.

== Yankees dominance during the curse ==
From 1920 through 2003, the Yankees won 26 World Series championships and 39 pennants, compared to only four pennants for the Red Sox. In every year that the Red Sox won the pennant – 1946, 1967, 1975 and 1986 – they lost the World Series 4–3, leaving them with no World Series titles. During this time, the Red Sox finished second in the standings to the Yankees on twelve occasions – in 1938, 1939, 1941, 1942, 1949, 1977, 1978, and every year from 1998 to 2003. During the 84-year period, the Yankees finished with a better regular-season record than the Red Sox 66 times, leading one sportswriter to quip that the Yankees' rivalry with the Red Sox was much like the rivalry "between a hammer and a nail." The Yankees finished second in the standings to the Red Sox twice, in 1986 and 1995.

=== 1920s and 1930s: First Yankees dynasty ===
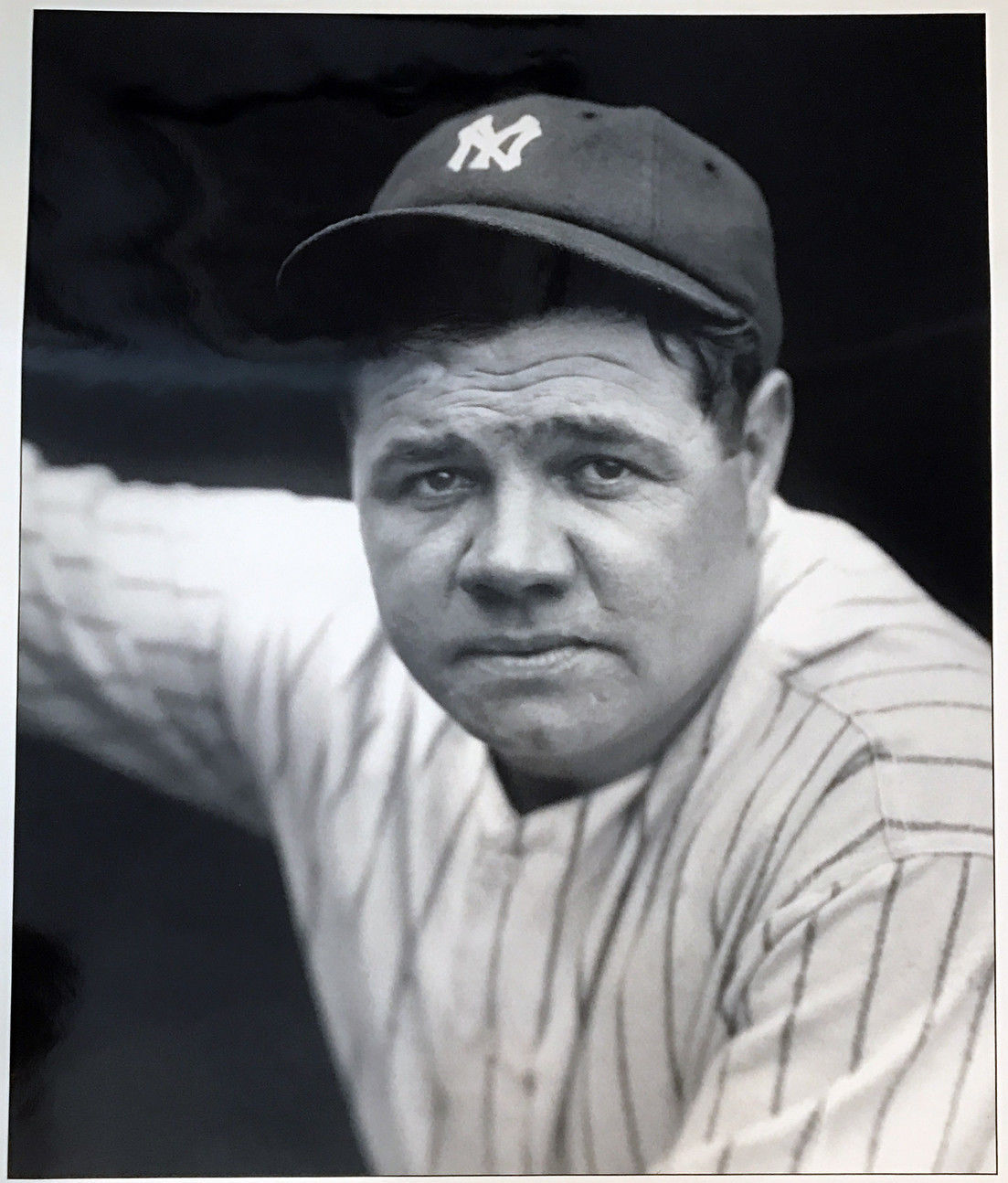
Babe Ruth with the Yankees

Just two years after Ruth's sale, he went on to have a record setting season, one of the greatest in major league history for a batter. This propelled the Yankees to win their first pennant and face their cross-town rival. Ruth got hurt during the Series, and the Yankees eventually dropped the last three games, losing the Series 5–3 to the Giants in the last ever best-of-nine Series. Both the Yankees and Giants would play in the 1922 World Series as well, a series that would be the Yankees' last in the two teams' shared stadium at the Polo Grounds, as the Giants served the Yankees an eviction notice after the 1921 season.

The Yankees moved across the Harlem River to the Bronx into Yankee Stadium. On April 18, 1923, the Yankees opened their new home against the Red Sox. Over 74,200 people watched the Yankees defeat the Red Sox, 4–1, in the first game played at the stadium. Babe Ruth hit the new stadium's first home run, christening the stadium as "The House that Ruth Built." Ruth would finish the year with a .393 batting average and the Yankees won their first World Series that year. Of the 24 players on the Yankees, 11 previously played for the Red Sox.

Several lesser known moments in the rivalry occurred during the 1930s. Pitcher Red Ruffing was traded in 1930 from the Red Sox to the Yankees. Ruffing, who had limited success with the Red Sox, would go on to a Hall of Fame career with the Yankees winning six World Series. On May 30, 1938, before 83,533 spectators at Yankee Stadium, Yankees outfielder Jake Powell and Red Sox player-manager Joe Cronin fought on the field and beneath the stands. Both players were fined and suspended for 10 games. The Yankees and Red Sox would finish first and second in the League respectively that year as well as the following. The Yankees went on to sweep the Chicago Cubs in the World Series and the Cincinnati Reds in the World Series a year later.

=== 1940s–1960s: Teddy Ballgame and Joltin' Joe ===
Ted Williams (middle) and Joe DiMaggio (right) in 1991. The Hall of Fame outfielders personified the Red Sox–Yankees rivalry during the 1940s and 1950s.

The rivalry intensified in 1941 when Ted Williams of the Red Sox batted .406, becoming the last player to bat over .400 in a season. Despite his accomplishment, Williams lost the AL MVP race to the Yankees' Joe DiMaggio, who in the same season set the record for a hitting streak, with 56 straight games with a hit. Williams later reminisced about his rivalry with DiMaggio saying "DiMaggio was the greatest all-around player I ever saw. His career cannot be summed up in numbers and awards. It might sound corny, but he had a profound and lasting impact on the country." Both teams almost swapped the two players. In 1947, Boston Red Sox owner Tom Yawkey and Yankees GM Larry MacPhail were rumored to have verbally agreed to trade DiMaggio for Williams, but MacPhail refused to include Yogi Berra and the deal fell through. Joe DiMaggio's younger brother Dom would play for the Red Sox his entire career during the 1940s.

The Red Sox won 15 games in a row in 1946. They were unstoppable and were in first place all but two days in the season, and would play in their first World Series game since 1918, having finished ahead of the Yankees in the American League for the first time since selling Babe Ruth. Since the Red Sox last pennant in 1918, the Yankees had won 14 pennants and 10 World Series. Boston would eventually lose the Series 4–3 to the St. Louis Cardinals.

Former Yankees manager Joe McCarthy came out of retirement after a feud with Yankees ownership to sign with the Red Sox as their manager in 1948. Both the Yankees and the Red Sox were involved in a tight pennant race with the Cleveland Indians until the final weekend. The Red Sox eliminated the Yankees in the final series at Fenway Park, overcoming four DiMaggio hits in the final game to tie Cleveland for the pennant. The situation forced the first-ever one-game playoff in AL history, which the Indians won 8–3 at Fenway Park and preventing the first all-Boston World Series, as the Indians went on to defeat the Boston Braves in the Series.

A year later, the Red Sox entered the final series of the season at Yankee Stadium needing only one win over the Yankees to advance to the World Series. The Sox lost 5–3 on the last day of the season after falling 5–4 the previous day, resulting in the Yankees winning the AL pennant. The Yankees went on to defeat the Brooklyn Dodgers in the 1949 World Series for their 12th championship.

The 1951 season opened up at Yankee Stadium. The Yankees defeated the Red Sox in public address (PA) announcer Bob Sheppard first game. Sheppard would go on to serve PA duties at Yankee Stadium for another 56 years. On September 28 of that year, Yankees pitcher Allie Reynolds pitched a no-hitter against the Red Sox. A year later, Red Sox outfielder Jimmy Piersall and Yankees second baseman Billy Martin exchanged insults before a game in Boston, and ended up fighting in the tunnel under the stands. The fight was eventually broken up by Yankees coaches Bill Dickey and Oscar Melillo, and Boston starting pitcher Ellis Kinder. Piersall changed out of his bloody shirt and promptly fought with teammate Maury McDermott. The Red Sox won 5–2 with Piersall sitting the game out.

The Yankees won five consecutive World Series titles from 1949 to 1953, breaking their previous streak of four straight titles from 1936 to 1939. They would also go on to win 14 AL pennants in 16 years from 1949 to 1964.

=== 1961–1980: Milestones, fights, close finishes, and the Bucky Dent game ===
The 1961 season saw the chase of Babe Ruth's 1927 single season home run record by Roger Maris and Mickey Mantle. Both Maris and Mantle would continue to reach the home run record until Mantle got injured late in the season, leaving Maris to reach the record. On the last day of the season, Maris broke the record with his 61st home run of the year off Red Sox pitcher Tracy Stallard at Yankee Stadium. Former Hall of Fame shortstop for the Yankees, Phil Rizzuto, called the shot in what was one of his first games as an announcer. The Yankees won the game 1–0 to win their 26th American League pennant and then to win their 19th World Series title.

The next year, the Red Sox had been in the middle of a streak of eight straight losing seasons. The team was so bad, that after a 13–3 loss to the Yankees on July 26, Red Sox ace Gene Conley got off the bus and attempted to leave the country and go to Israel. Conley was denied his request because he did not have a passport. Nonetheless, Conley stayed away from the team for three days.

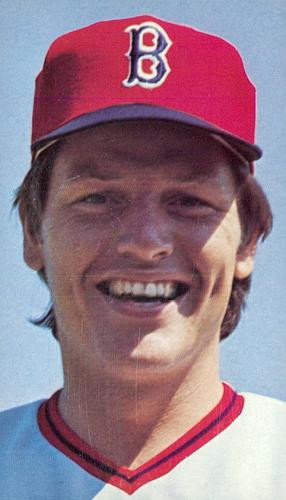
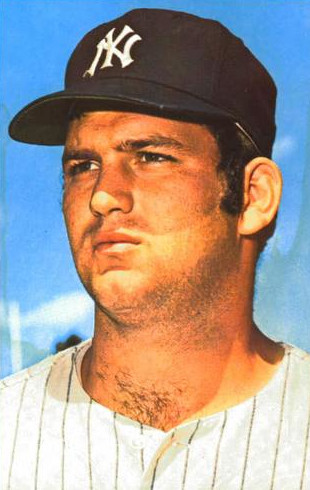
The Carlton Fisk (left) and Thurman Munson (right) rivalry was at the core of the Yankees-Red Sox tension of the 1970s.

In 1967, Red Sox pitcher Billy Rohr came within a single strike of a no-hitter at Yankee Stadium. Elston Howard hit a two-out, two-strike single in the ninth to break the no-hit bid. Rohr completed the one-hitter, but ultimately finished his career with only two wins, both coming against the Yankees. Later that year, Red Sox third baseman Joe Foy hit a grand slam during the first game of a two-game series. In the second game, Yankees pitcher Thad Tillotson threw two brushback pitches at Foy before beaning him in the batting helmet. In the next inning, Red Sox pitcher Jim Lonborg beaned Tillotson. Both pitchers yelled at each other, and then a brawl ensued. During the fight, Red Sox outfielder Reggie Smith picked up and body-slammed Tillotson to the ground. Two months later, both teams were involved in the longest game ever played (by innings) at Yankee Stadium. New York recorded a 20-inning 4–3 victory over Boston. Earlier that year on August 3, the Yankees traded Howard to the Red Sox to help bolster their team during the pennant race. When Howard returned to Yankee Stadium in a Red Sox uniform, the Yankees fans gave him a standing ovation. Boston would be led by Hall of Famer Carl Yastrzemski's historic season winning the batting triple crown, leading the Red Sox to the pennant in what was a dream year for the Sox. Howard's contribution would be instrumental in the 1967 World Series, but he and Yastrzemski would lose to Bob Gibson and the St. Louis Cardinals four games to three.

In 1973, the American League adopted the designated hitter rule. On April 6, opening the season at Fenway Park, Ron Blomberg of the Yankees became the first designated hitter in Major League history. Red Sox pitcher Luis Tiant walked Blomberg in his first plate appearance of the game. Later that year at Fenway Park, with the score tied 2–2 in the top of the ninth, Yankees catcher Thurman Munson attempted to score from third base on a missed bunt by Gene Michael. He crashed into Red Sox catcher Carlton Fisk resulting in a fight with Munson punching Fisk in the face. The rivalry intensified in the 1970s with the fans too, as just a year later in 1974 at Fenway Park, Yankees first baseman Chris Chambliss was struck in the right arm with a dart thrown from the stands after hitting an RBI ground-rule double. Two years later, Yankees outfielder Lou Piniella would crash into Fisk feet first in an attempt to score in the sixth inning of a game at Yankee Stadium. The two benches cleared while Piniella and Fisk brawled at home plate. After the fight apparently died down and order appeared to be restored, Sox pitcher Bill Lee and Yankees third baseman Graig Nettles and center fielder Mickey Rivers began to exchange words, resulting in another fight. Lee suffered a separated left shoulder from the tilt and missed the next 51 games of the 1976 season. He would continue to pitch until 1982. The 1976 season saw the Yankees win the pennant, but lose to the Big Red Machine in the 1976 World Series, just like the Red Sox had done a year prior in the 1975 World Series in which Carlton Fisk hit his famous home run off of the left field foul pole at Fenway Park.

After the Yankees' loss to the Reds, owner George Steinbrenner committed to sign marquee free agent Reggie Jackson to help win a championship. The Yankees, Red Sox, and Baltimore Orioles would battle each other the entire year in the division race. The Yankees would win the division for the second year in a row, while the Orioles and Red Sox finished tied for second, 2 1/2 games behind the Yankees. Jackson's entry onto the Yankees initially had caused a lot of friction on them. In the middle game of what would prove to be a three-game series sweep by the Red Sox at Fenway Park, Yankees manager Billy Martin pulled Reggie Jackson off the field in mid-inning for failing to hustle on a ball hit to the outfield. The extremely angry and highly animated Martin had to be restrained by coaches Yogi Berra and Elston Howard from getting into a fistfight with Jackson in the dugout during the nationally televised game. Eventually, emotions calmed down for the season and the Yankees came together to recapture the pennant and defeat the Los Angeles Dodgers in the 1977 World Series, their first since 1962.

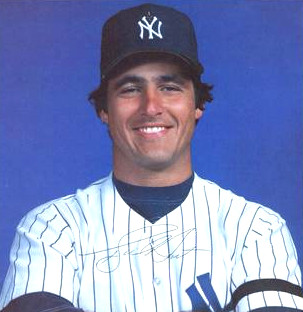
Bucky Dent hit the home run that won the AL East in a one-game playoff for the Yankees at Fenway Park in 1978, but he was fired as manager of the Yankees there in 1990.

In 1978, the Red Sox, led by Jim Rice, Carl Yastrzemski, Fred Lynn and catcher Carlton Fisk, and managed by future Yankees coach Don Zimmer, were looking good for the World Series for the second time in the decade. They led the Yankees in the standings by 14 games in mid-July, with less than three months to go in the regular season. The Yankees turned their season around just as the Red Sox started to collapse. By September 7, the Yankees had whittled down the 14-game deficit to only four games, just in time for a four-game series at Fenway Park in Boston. The Yankees won all four games in the series by a combined score of 42–9. This series became known as the "Boston Massacre". On September 16, the Yankees held a 3 1/2-game lead over the Red Sox, but the Sox won 12 of their next 14 games to overcome that deficit and finish in a first-place tie with the Yankees. A tie-breaker game was scheduled in Boston to determine who would win the AL East pennant for 1978.

Boston pitted former Yankees pitcher Mike Torrez against the Yankees' Cy Young Award winner, Ron Guidry, who took a 24–3 record into the game. The Sox were beating Guidry 2–0 in the top of the seventh inning when light-hitting Yankees shortstop Bucky Dent hit a two-out, three-run home run over Fenway Park's Green Monster to take a 3–2 lead. It was only his fifth home run of the season. The Yankees later led 5–2 and held on to win 5–4 when Yastrzemski popped out with runners on first and third, ending the Red Sox' season. Yankees closer Goose Gossage notched his 27th save of the season. Gossage would later comment years later about how he was spat on at Fenway Park and had beer thrown in his face. "There is no rivalry in sports that rivals the Yankees – Red Sox...that playoff game in '78–it felt like the playoffs and World Series were exhibition games after that." The headline in The Boston Globe the next day summed it all up: "Destiny 5, Red Sox 4." New York went on to defeat the Kansas City Royals in the ALCS and the Los Angeles Dodgers in the World Series for their second straight championship.

== 1980s and early 1990s ==
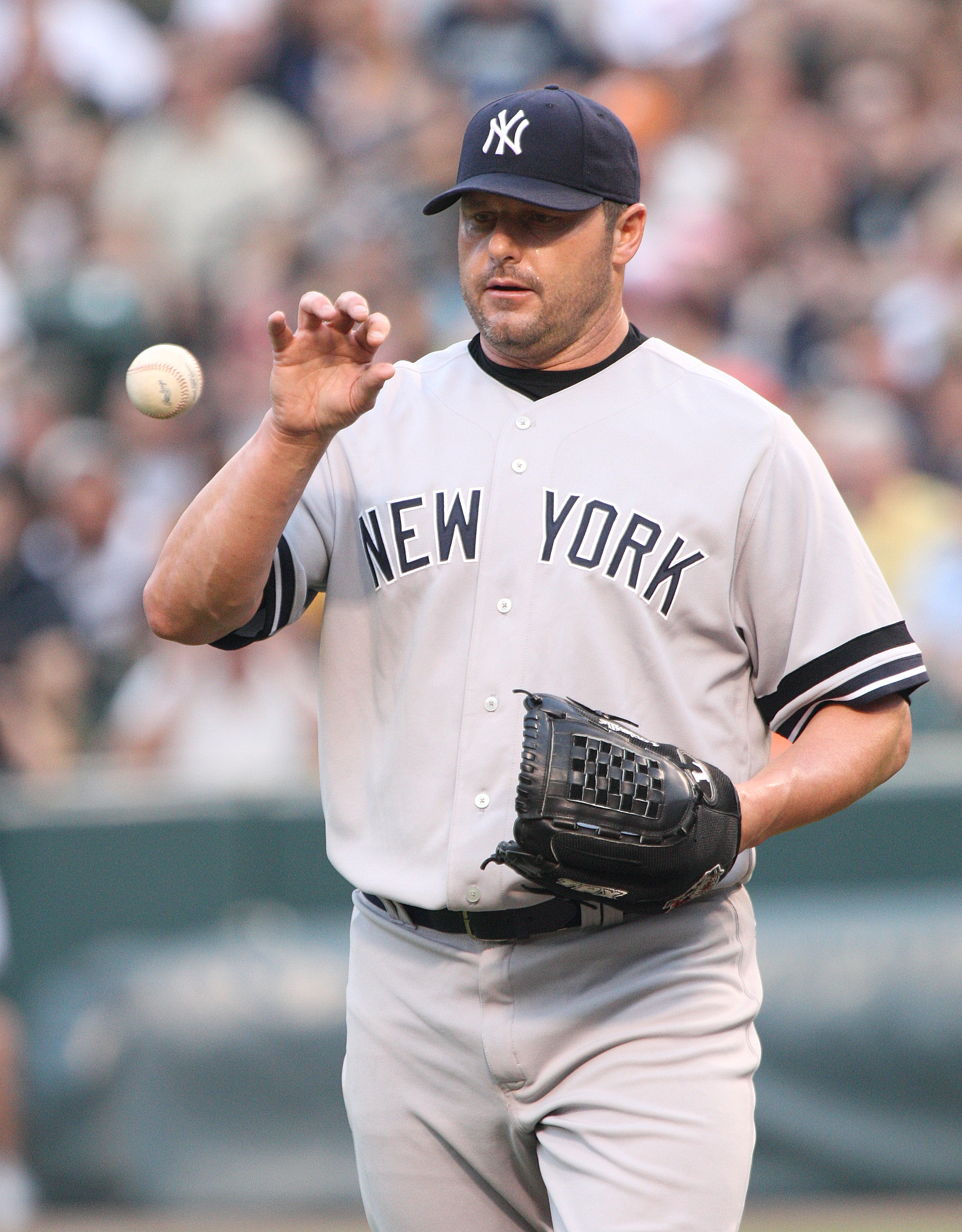
Roger Clemens played for both the Red Sox and the Yankees.

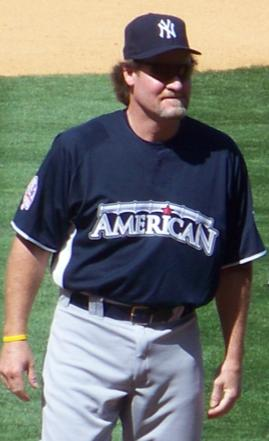
Wade Boggs played primarily for the Red Sox, but he also played for the Yankees. He played in a World Series with both the Red Sox and Yankees.

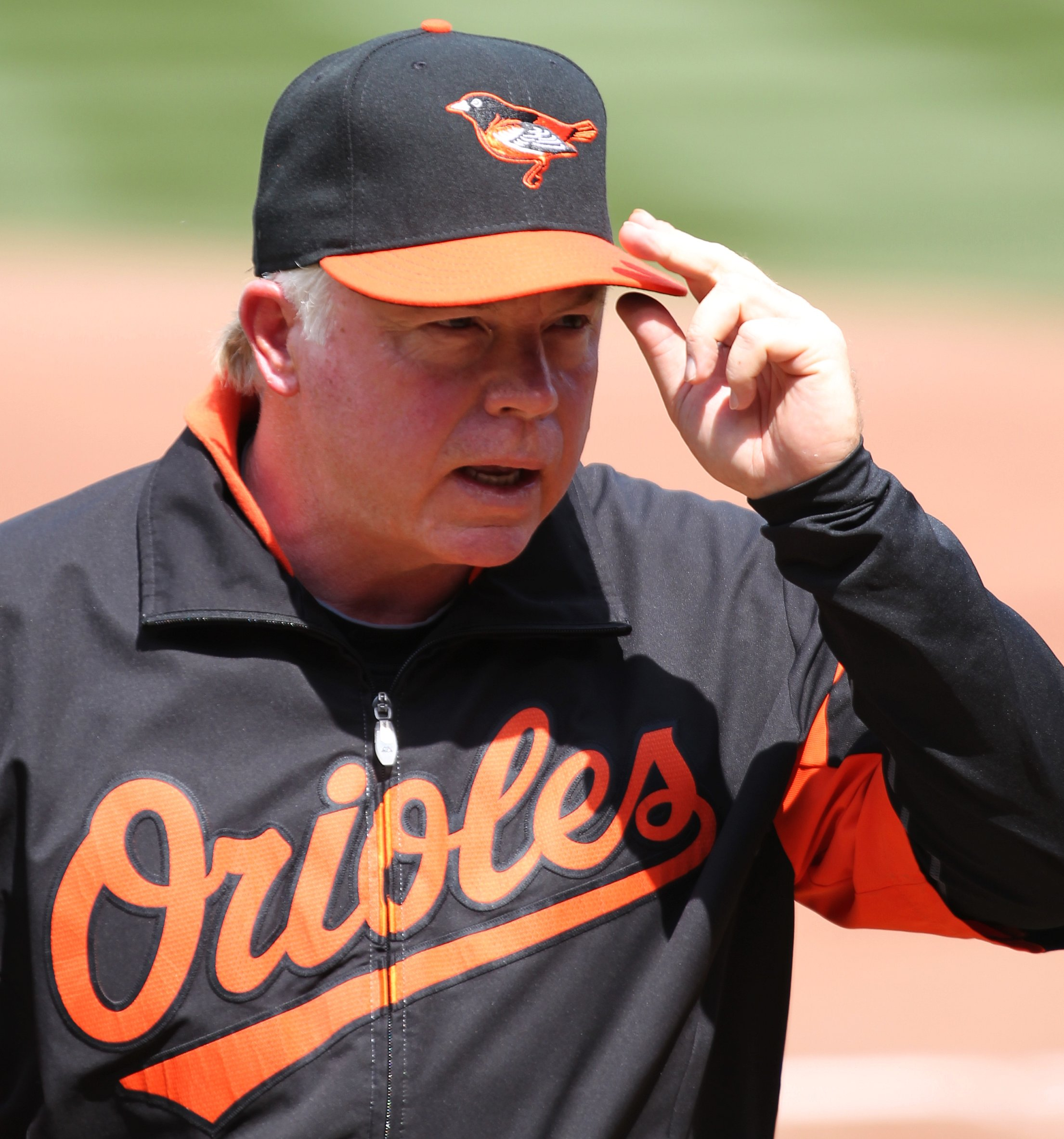
Buck Showalter and Butch Hobson made their managerial debuts against each other in 1992. Both were fired during or as a result of the 1994–95 Major League Baseball strike.

=== 1980s: No championships ===
The 1980s is the only decade in which neither the Yankees nor the Red Sox won a World Series. Although both teams went to a World Series during that decade, the Red Sox were not serious contenders in the Yankees' playoff years (1980 and 1981), but the Yankees seriously contended in the Red Sox' playoff years (1986 and 1988).

The Yankees lost the World Series in 1981, while the Red Sox loss came in 1986. Both times, the teams lost after being up 2–0 in their respective World Series. For the Yankees, the loss in 1981 marked the beginning of the team's demise and downfall in the 1980s and early 1990s. Despite the lack of championships, the rivalry between the teams did have some memorable highlights. Yankees left-hander Dave Righetti threw a no-hitter against the Red Sox at Yankee Stadium. One of the game's greatest hitters, Wade Boggs, struck out to end the game.

On October 4, 1986, Righetti once again made history against the Red Sox when he saved both games of a doubleheader against them, finishing the season with 46 saves, and breaking the major league record shared by Dan Quisenberry and Bruce Sutter. The record would stand until Bobby Thigpen saved 57 games for the Chicago White Sox in 1990, which would also be Righetti's last season with the Yankees. Righetti retained the single-season record for left-handers until 1993, when Randy Myers saved 53 games for the Chicago Cubs; Righetti still owns the AL record for left-handers.

Righetti's teammate, first baseman and defending American League MVP Don Mattingly, came into the last game batting .352, second in the league to Boston's Wade Boggs. With Boggs sitting out the game, Mattingly needed to go 6 for 6 to win the batting title. Although Mattingly would hit a home run in his first at bat and a double later on, he fell short and Boggs won the batting title. Mattingly would be named most outstanding player that year by the press, but fell short to Boggs' teammate Roger Clemens in the AL MVP voting.

Despite Righetti's pitching on the last day of the season, the Red Sox still won the division and marched on in the playoffs. The Red Sox faced the Yankees' cross-town rivals, the New York Mets, in the World Series. The New York Times called the series a "painful series". Newsday called it "woeful days for Yankee fans". Mike Lupica of the New York Daily News called the series "the World Series that is the Yankee nightmare". Both Newsday and The Boston Globe said there were Mets T-shirts saying "Steinbrenner's nightmare," referring to Yankees owner George Steinbrenner. John Powers of the Globe quoted Claire Smith, who covered the Yankees for the Hartford Courant, as having said "this really is the World Series of the nightmares".

In Game 6 of the World Series, Boston (leading the series 3–2) took a 5–3 lead in the top of the 10th inning. In the bottom half of the inning, Red Sox reliever Calvin Schiraldi retired the first two batters, putting the team within one out of winning the World Series. The Mets, however, scored three runs, tying the game on a wild pitch from Bob Stanley and winning it when Boston first baseman Bill Buckner allowed a ground ball hit by the Mets' Mookie Wilson to roll through his legs, scoring Ray Knight from second base. In Game 7, the Red Sox took an early 3–0 lead, only to lose 8–5. The collapses in the last two games prompted a series of articles by George Vecsey of The New York Times fueling speculation that the Red Sox were "cursed".

The 1987 season saw rivalry at the end of the season, as on September 29, Yankees' first baseman Don Mattingly set an MLB record by hitting his sixth grand slam home-run of the season against the Red Sox. The competitiveness of the teams continued the following year. Co-captains Ron Guidry and Willie Randolph had led the Yankees to first place two weeks after the All-Star break. On July 28, the Yankees fell out of first place, and the Red Sox won their second division title in three years. Boston went on to face the Oakland Athletics in the 1988 American League Championship Series, but would end up getting swept.

=== 1990–1995 ===
In the early to mid-1990s, the two teams were seldom equally good. The Yankees had the worst record in the American League when the Red Sox won their division title in 1990. In 1992, both teams finished at or near the bottom of the AL East.

In 1990, Boston Globe columnist Dan Shaughnessy wrote a book titled The Curse of the Bambino, criticizing the Red Sox for the sale of Babe Ruth, and publicized the curse. When the Red Sox were at Yankee Stadium during a weekend in September 1990, Yankees fans started to chant "1918!" to taunt the Red Sox, reminding them of the last time they won a World Series. Each time the Red Sox were at Yankee Stadium afterward, demeaning chants of "1918!" echoed through the stadium. Yankees fans also taunted the Red Sox with signs saying "1918!", "CURSE OF THE BAMBINO", pictures of Babe Ruth, and wearing "1918!" T-shirts each time they were at the Stadium. Other teams would not pick up the "1918!" chant; it was only at Yankee Stadium where the chants of "1918!" were heard.

On June 6, 1990, before a Yankees–Red Sox game at Fenway Park, Bucky Dent was fired as manager of the Yankees, making Fenway Park the scene of his worst moment in baseball, although he had his greatest moment there. Although Red Sox fans felt retribution as Dent was fired on their field, and players on the Yankees, including former Red Sox catcher Rick Cerone and Mattingly felt Dent was used as a scapegoat, both sides were shaken to the core by the firing and called it an outrage, blasting Steinbrenner for firing Dent in Boston. Dan Shaughnessy said he should "have waited until the Yankees got to Baltimore" to fire Dent. He said that "if Dent had been fired in Seattle or Milwaukee, this would have been just another event in an endless line of George's jettisons. But it happened in Boston and the nightly news had its hook." He also said that "the firing was only special because...it's the first time a Yankees manager...was purged on the ancient Indian burial grounds of the Back Bay." Yankees television analyst Tony Kubek blasted the firing in a harsh, angry way. At the beginning of the broadcast of the game on MSG Network, he said to Yankees television play-by-play announcer Dewayne Staats, "George Steinbrenner...mishandled this. You don't take a Bucky Dent (at) the site of one of the greatest home runs in Yankee history and fire him and make it a media circus for the Boston Red Sox." He then stared defiantly on camera and said to Steinbrenner, "You don't do it by telephone, either, George. You do it face to face, eyeball to eyeball...If you really are a winner, you should not have handled this like a loser." He then said, angrily, "George, you're a bully and a coward." He then said that "What all this does, it just wrecks George Steinbrenner's credibility with his players, with the front office and in baseball more than it already is–if that's possible. It was just mishandled."

The 1993 season saw long-time Red Sox fan favorite Wade Boggs defect to the Yankees after eleven seasons with Boston. Later in September 1993, the Yankees defeated Boston at Yankee Stadium via a last-moment reprieve. Trailing 3–1, Mike Stanley's apparent fly out with two outs in the ninth was nullified by a fan running onto the field prior to the pitch being thrown. The umpire had called time and when play resumed, Stanley singled. The Yankees would rally to score three runs and win on a Mattingly single.

The Yankees' 1980s demise and downfall continued into the early 1990s and was at its frustrating peak in 1994, when they finished with the best record in the American League in a season that was prematurely halted by the 1994–95 Major League Baseball strike, which left New York sports fans disappointed that Mattingly had not played in a postseason despite being poised to do so that year. At that time, he led active players in both games played and at-bats without participating in a postseason game. Throughout October, the news media added to the embarrassment when they often made references to dates that games in the World Series would have been played. That year, the Yankees and Red Sox would have finished the season against each other at Fenway Park. Both managers, Buck Showalter of the Yankees and Butch Hobson of the Red Sox, who made their managerial debuts against each other, were fired as a result of or during the strike.

The strike was the harbinger of the 1995 season for the Yankees. Although the Red Sox jumped out to a fast start and finished the season in first place, the Yankees were not serious contenders for the division title. With the Yankees clinching the inaugural American League Wild Card on the last day of the season, the Yankees and Red Sox reached the post-season in the same season for the first time. Before the postseason began, Mattingly contemplated about the first-ever playoff series in the rivalry, saying, "That would be pretty cool. It wouldn't hurt the rivalry any. There'd be a few deaths...just kidding". Both teams lost in separate ALDS series, with the Red Sox being swept by the Cleveland Indians and the Yankees losing in five games to the Seattle Mariners. For the Yankees, the loss led to another post-strike fallout: both Showalter and general manager Gene Michael were fired as a result of the loss. Similarly, the firing of Michael as Yankees manager and the loss in the 1981 World Series were fallouts from the strike that year. In fact, the 1981 strike was antecedence to the Yankees' demise and downfall of the 1980s and 1990s and the strike in 1994 was part of that demise.

== 1996–2003: Yankees dominance and first postseason meetings ==
=== Late 1990s: Yankees dynasty ===
A year after captain Don Mattingly's retirement in 1995, the Yankees won the 1996 World Series. It was their first in 18 years and the first of former Red Sox player Wade Boggs' career. Boggs celebrated the victory with a memorable moment of jumping on the horse of a NYPD officer during the celebration.

The Yankees had one of the greatest seasons in baseball history in 1998. The Yankees won a then-AL record 114 games and the season culminated in a win over the San Diego Padres in the 1998 World Series. The Red Sox, too, made the playoffs in 1998, but as a Wild Card, they did not seriously contend for the division title. They lost their ALDS.

About four months after victory, the Yankees traded fan favorite David Wells to the Toronto Blue Jays for Roger Clemens, a fan favorite with the Red Sox between 1984 and 1996. Clemens was coming off two consecutive season with the Blue Jays where he had won both the pitching triple crown and the Cy Young Award in both 1997 and 1998.

Once the 1999 season started, a moment of peace occurred between the fans. Yankees manager Joe Torre returned to Fenway Park for his first game following a battle with prostate cancer. While the managers were exchanging lineup cards, the Boston crowd gave Torre a long standing ovation, to which he tipped his cap. Good relations were seen during the All-Star Game at Fenway Park. Yankees manager Joe Torre, manager for the American League team, replaced starting shortstop Nomar Garciaparra of the Red Sox with Derek Jeter. Garciaparra received a standing ovation from the fans after Jeter came in to replace him (they also embraced each other at this time). Later in the game, when he came to bat, Jeter gave Garciaparra a tribute by mimicking his batting stance. Nine years later, in a similar fashion, Red Sox manager Terry Francona managed the American League team at the All-Star Game at Yankee Stadium, in the stadium's final season.

On September 10, 1999, Chili Davis' second-inning home run was the only hit by the Yankees against Pedro Martínez, who struck out 17 Yankees – the most strikeouts against a Yankees team ever in a nine inning game. Martínez retired the last 22 batters after giving up the home run, including striking out eight of the final nine batters. The teams finished first and second in their division and both made the playoffs in the same season. This led to the very first post-season meeting in the longtime rivalry.

==== 1999 ALCS: First postseason meeting ====
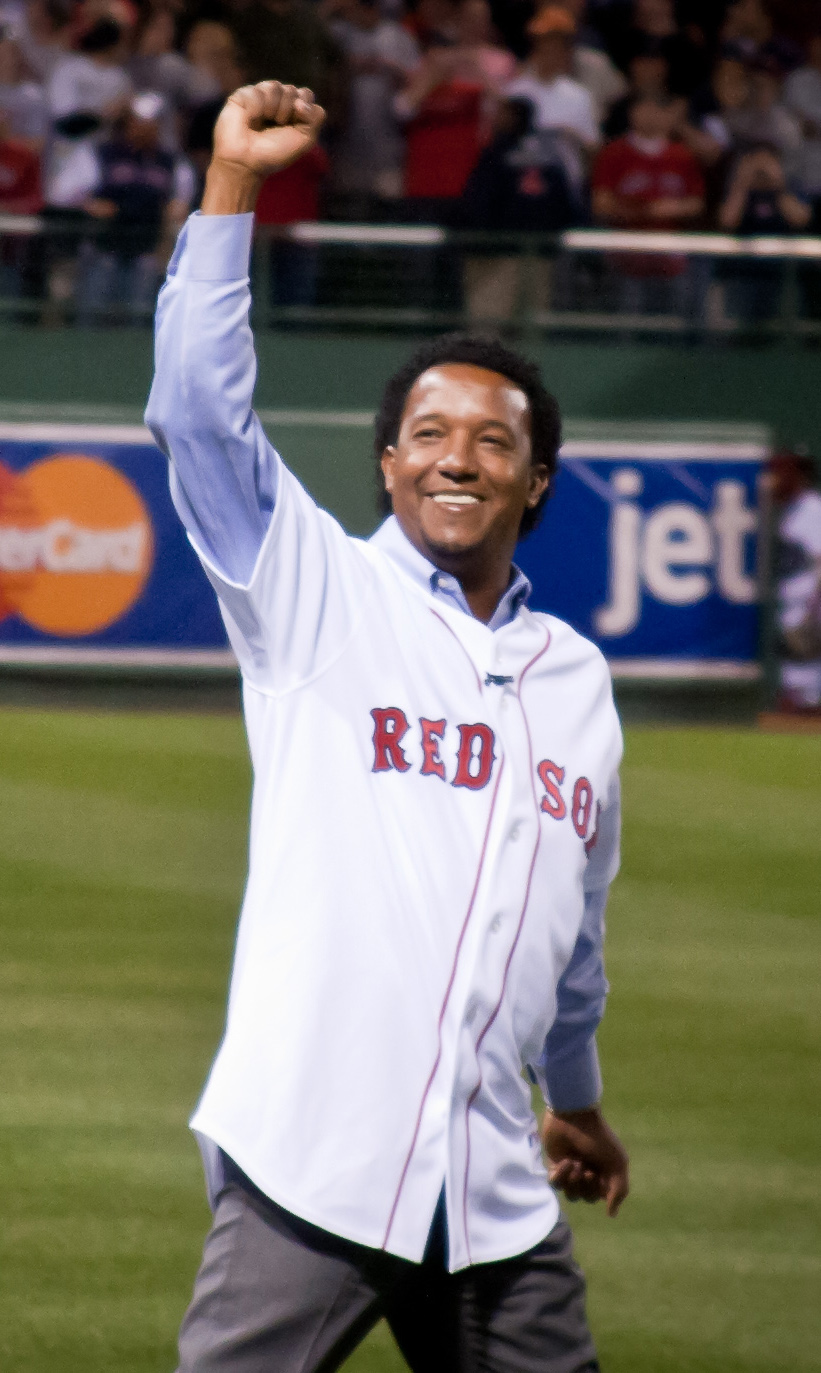
Pedro Martínez faced Roger Clemens in the 1999 ALCS. Earlier that season, Martínez had struck out the most Yankees (17) ever in a game.

In 1999, the Yankees and Red Sox faced each other for the first time in the ALCS. The Yankees were the defending World Series champions, while Boston had not appeared in the ALCS since 1990. The Yankees won Game 1 on a 10th-inning walk-off home run by Bernie Williams off Boston reliever Rod Beck. Intensity built up due to this historic, first-ever postseason meeting between the two longtime rivals. The Yankees would win the first two games at home with 7th-inning comebacks.

The lone bright spot for the Red Sox came in Game 3 at Fenway Park, in what had been a much anticipated pitching match-up of former Red Sox star Roger Clemens, who was now with the Yankees, and Boston ace Pedro Martínez. Martínez struck out twelve and did not allow a run through seven innings of work; Clemens was hit hard, giving up five earned runs and only lasting two innings of a 13–1 Red Sox victory. The Yankees rebounded to win Games 4 and 5, clinching the American League pennant and advancing to the World Series, where they swept the Atlanta Braves. The loss to Pedro Martínez was the Yankees' only postseason loss, as the team went 11–1.

The following year at Fenway Park, the Yankees beat the Red Sox, 22–1, handing Boston its most lopsided home loss ever. The Yankees scored 16 total runs in the 8th and 9th innings. The Yankees lost 15 of their final 18 games that season and finished with a record of 87–74, but the Red Sox failed to catch up and finished 2.5 games out of first to lose another division title to the Yankees. Despite having the lowest winning percentage of any postseason qualifier in 2000, the Yankees won their third consecutive World Series and 26th overall, in the first Subway Series since 1956, over their cross-town rivals, the New York Mets, in 5 games.

A year later, David Cone, one of the key players in the then-most recent Yankees dynasty, started for the Red Sox against the Yankees at Yankee Stadium to the sound of a standing ovation despite playing for the arch-rivals. Cone would later take part in another notable game later that year when he went up against newly acquired Yankees pitcher Mike Mussina. Mussina had come within one strike of pitching a perfect game against the Red Sox at Fenway Park. Carl Everett's 9th-inning single was the only baserunner allowed by Mussina in a 1–0 Yankees win. Coincidentally, David Cone was the last Yankees pitcher to throw a perfect game, in 1999.

On September 10, the two teams had a game against each other rained out. The next day, the country saw one of its biggest tragedies bring both sides together. Following the terrorist attacks on New York City's Twin World Trade Center Towers (which ironically involved two passenger jets departing from Boston), Boston fans displayed signs saying "Boston Loves New York" in a rare moment of peace between the two sides of the rivalry. On September 23, the Yankees' home field hosted a memorial service titled, "Prayer for America". The warm feeling of solidarity would once again be short-lived as just prior to the 2003 season, Red Sox President Larry Lucchino labeled New York Yankees the "Evil Empire" after Cuban free agent José Contreras opted to sign with the Yankees instead of the Red Sox. The new ownership group had made it their personal mission to win a championship.

=== 2001–2003: Unbalanced schedule ===
Major League Baseball changed its scheduling format beginning in 2001, further intensifying division matchups throughout the league. The new "unbalanced schedule" allowed for additional games in each season between divisional rivals, replacing additional series with teams outside the division. Due to the change, the Red Sox and Yankees now played each other 18–19 times each season. The scheduling drew criticism both when it was enacted and after the fact, with some analysts even positing the unbalanced schedule hurt intra-divisional play.

In 2002, the Red Sox asked the Yankees for permission to interview one of George Steinbrenner's assistants, former Yankees general manager Gene Michael, for their vacant general manager position, but Steinbrenner denied their request. Boston Red Sox then hired Theo Epstein, a protégé of Red Sox President and CEO Larry Lucchino, as general manager, and at 28 years old, he was the youngest general manager in baseball history.

==== 2003 ALCS ====
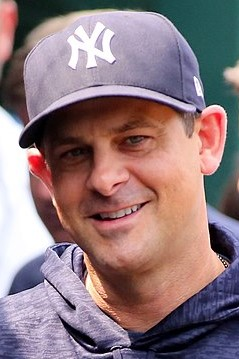
Aaron Boone, hit the walk-off home run to win the 2003 American League pennant for the Yankees. Boone is the current Yankees manager.

Both teams would face off in the ALCS once again in 2003. Entering the series, the Red Sox were the favorites to reach the 2003 World Series and The New York Times had endorsed a showdown between the Red Sox and the Chicago Cubs, the latter of whom had not been to the World Series since 1945 and had not won a championship since 1908.

Due to the unbalanced schedule, when Boston forced the ALCS to a full seven games, the seventh game set a major league record for the rivalry between the two teams: it marked the first time two major league teams have played more than 25 games against each other over the course of a single season.

In the top of the fourth inning of Game 3 of the ALCS at Fenway Park, Red Sox starting pitcher Pedro Martínez hit Yankees batter Karim García, prompting an argument between the two players, which ended with both teams clearing the benches but no punches being thrown. In the bottom half of the inning, a pitch from Roger Clemens to Manny Ramírez was high and inside, and a brawl ensued. Ramírez swore at Clemens for the pitch. Yankees bench coach Don Zimmer, then 72 years old, and who had been the manager of the "doomed" 1978 Boston Red Sox, charged at Martínez; the pitcher grabbed Zimmer by the head and swung him to the ground. Later, midway through the ninth inning, García and Yankees pitcher Jeff Nelson fought with a Fenway Park groundskeeper, Paul Williams, in the bullpen. Two Boston Police officers issued a report saying Nelson and García engaged in "an unprovoked attack" on Williams and summonses would be sought for the two New York Yankees for assault and battery. After reviewing the incident, MLB Commissioner Bud Selig said he was "very disappointed" by the behavior of the participants and fined Martínez $50,000, Ramírez $25,000, García $10,000, and Zimmer $5,000.

In Game 7 at Yankee Stadium, the Red Sox held a 5–2 lead through seven and a half innings due to an ineffective start by Roger Clemens, but the Yankees remained in the game because of three shutout innings of relief by Mike Mussina in his first career relief appearance. After Boston Red Sox starter Pedro Martínez gave up a run in the eighth, manager Grady Little visited the mound but elected to leave a tiring Martínez to complete the inning. Martínez then gave up a ground-rule double to Hideki Matsui, and Yankees catcher Jorge Posada blooped a double into center field that drove in two runners and tied the game. The game went into extra innings and in the bottom of the eleventh inning, leadoff hitter Aaron Boone, grandson of Ray Boone, a (retired) longtime scout with the Red Sox, hit a solo home run off of Tim Wakefield to left field, ending the game and the series, giving the Yankees their 39th American League pennant. The Long Island, New York, newspaper Newsday went to the press before the game was over, and thinking Boston would win the game, editorialized as to what was wrong with the Yankees, and why they had lost the ALCS to the Red Sox. In a postgame interview, Red Sox first baseman Kevin Millar described the emotions in the Red Sox locker room: "It was like we were all back in high school, like we'd all just gotten beat in the state playoffs, and everyone was going to graduate.... When you're a teenager and you lose the big football game, that's when you see guys cry uncontrollably. You don't [usually] see that much at this level." The Yankees would lose the World Series that year to the Florida Marlins in six games.

Two days later, the Red Sox fired Grady Little. People blamed him for the Game 7 loss, claiming he left Martínez in for too long.

== 2004–16: The curse is broken ==
=== 2004: Red Sox win World Series ===
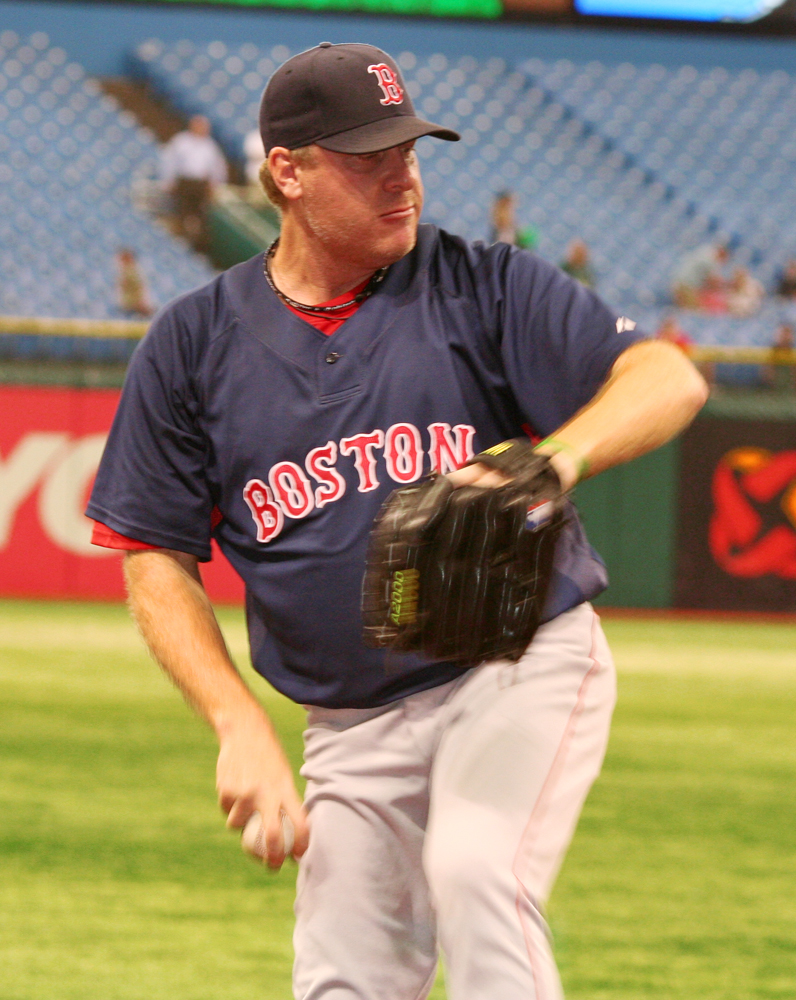
Curt Schilling beat the Yankees in the 2001 World Series while with the Arizona Diamondbacks and in the 2004 ALCS with the Red Sox.

In an effort to build up their lineup, the Red Sox set up a potential deal that would send Texas Rangers shortstop and reigning AL MVP Alex Rodriguez to Boston and Manny Ramírez and other players to Texas. The deal eventually fell through after Rodriguez indicated he would not go against the MLBPA, which opposed a proposed renegotiation that would have potentially reduced Rodríguez's earnings in the later years of his contract. A freak off-season basketball injury to Aaron Boone, just months removed from his historic home run, had Yankees management looking at possible options to replace him. Despite being courted by Boston for nearly three months, Rodriguez was traded to New York.

That year, the Red Sox won an eventful season series against the Yankees, 11–8. A 13-inning comeback win for the Yankees on July 1 was punctuated by a catch from Jeter, who ran and dove into the stands at full speed and came out with facial lacerations when Trot Nixon hit a pop up in an area deep behind third base. On July 24, Jason Varitek shoved his glove into the face of Rodriguez after Rodriguez was hit by a pitch from Bronson Arroyo, causing a bench-clearing brawl. Though he was ejected (along with Rodriguez) from the game following the incident, the moment sparked Boston to an 11–10 come-from-behind victory. After a 6–4 loss on September 24 in which he gave up 5 runs, Pedro Martínez told media "I just tip my hat and call the Yankees my daddy". This would lead Yankees fans to taunt Pedro with "who's your Daddy" chants for the remainder of his career. The Red Sox finished second to the Yankees in the AL East for the seventh straight season. Both teams would advance to the ALCS for the second straight year.

==== 2004 ALCS: The curse is broken ====
After the melodrama of the 2003 ALCS, a rematch in 2004 was hotly anticipated. Yankees general manager Brian Cashman said "I think Boston...really are...a mirror image of us in terms of...aggressiveness and desire to win". Yankees pitcher Mike Mussina summarized the buildup: "This is what everyone was hoping for...it's a rematch of last year, with the best two teams in the American League".

The Yankees won the first three games of the series, including a 19–8 rout in Game 3. No team in the history of baseball had ever won a best-of-seven series after being down 3–0. Entering the bottom of the ninth inning of Game 4 at Fenway Park, Yankees reliever Mariano Rivera was attempting to close out a 4–3 lead. But after a lead-off walk to Kevin Millar, pinch-runner Dave Roberts stole second and came around to score on an RBI single by Bill Mueller. Boston won the game in the bottom of the 12th inning on a home run by David Ortiz. Game 5 featured another extra-inning Boston comeback, as the Red Sox tied the game in the 8th inning and won it in the 14th on a single hit by Ortiz that drove in Damon from second. In Game 6, Curt Schilling, who tore a tendon sheath in his right ankle during the ALDS against Anaheim, pitched seven innings of one-run ball. Schilling's tendon had been sutured to his ankle to relieve the discomfort and was given local anesthetic and painkillers for the game. During the game, his sock started to absorb the blood from his freshly sutured ankle, and "the bloody sock" instantly became an indelible image of the dramatic series. A controversial call was made when Alex Rodriguez was called out after he intentionally slapped the ball out of Arroyo's hand while running to first base. Boston held on to win the contest, 4–2. They then completed their historic comeback with a blowout win in Game 7 by a score of 10–3. The New York Yankees blowing the 3–0 lead has been considered the biggest collapse in the history of baseball.

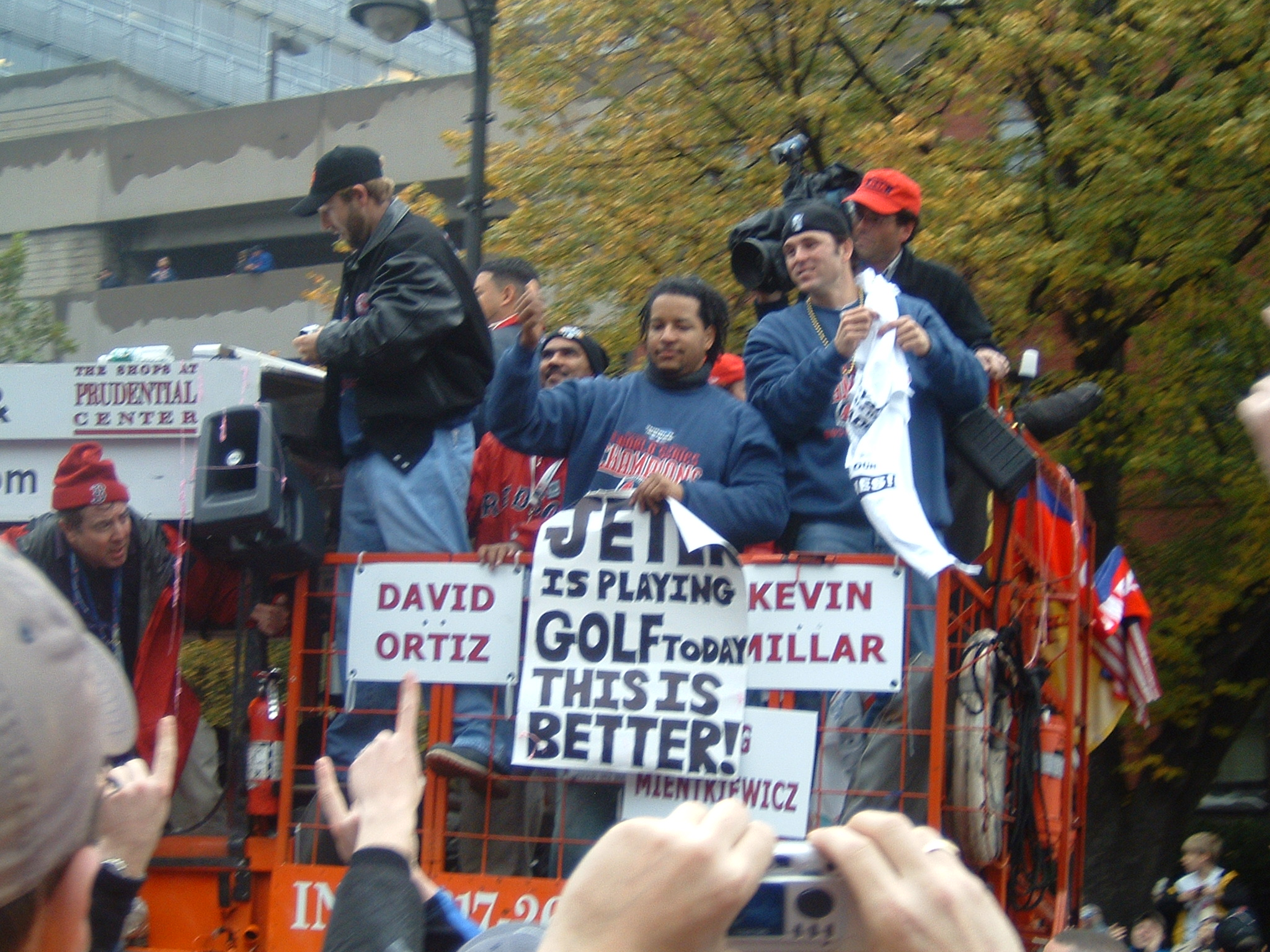
Manny Ramírez at the Red Sox victory parade in 2004, with a sign that one of the spectators handed him.

The Red Sox would go on to win their first World Series championship in 86 years, completing a four-game sweep of the St. Louis Cardinals in the 2004 World Series.

=== 2005–2009: Yankees, Red Sox win titles ===
At Yankee Stadium on April 3, 2005, the teams' first meeting since the 2004 ALCS, Yankees fans started new taunts, saying "The Curse of 1918 is finally over (86 years). Let the new curse 2090 begin." They also projected the next Red Sox championship with signs saying "1918-2004-2090." A week later, the Red Sox received their World Series rings at Fenway Park before they played the Yankees. All of the Yankees went to the top step of the dugout to applaud their rivals' accomplishment. During the announcement of the lineups, Red Sox fans reciprocated by giving Yankees closer Mariano Rivera, who had struggled against the Red Sox in the previous year's ALCS, a loud standing ovation, despite their booing of Alex Rodriguez. Rivera laughed and tipped his cap. In New York, the YES Network, the Yankees television network, declined to broadcast it. Instead, a fixed camera shot was focused tightly on correspondent Kimberly Jones as she described in general terms the events surrounding her; afterwards, YES was criticized for the move. The Red Sox won the game 8–1.

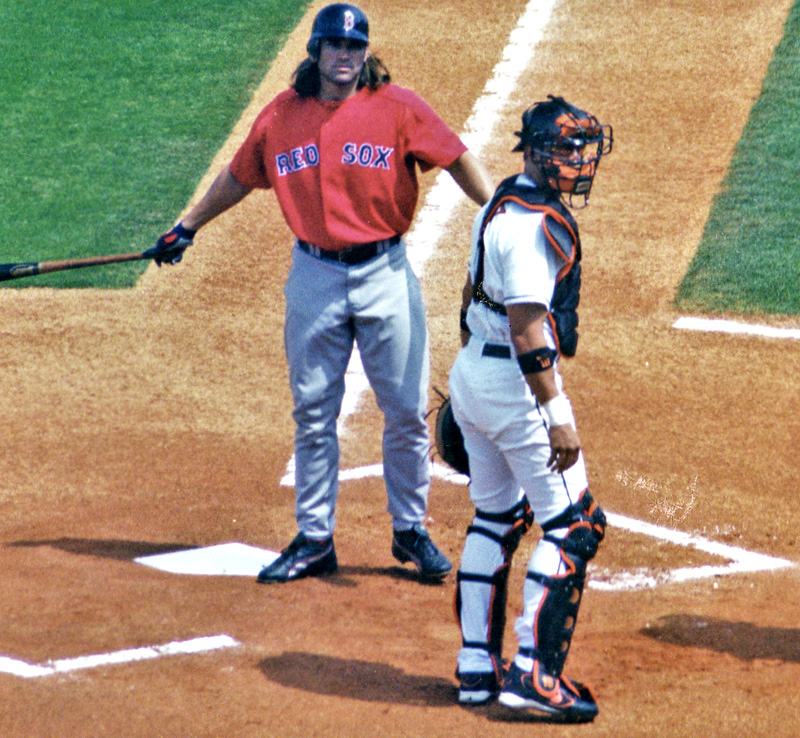
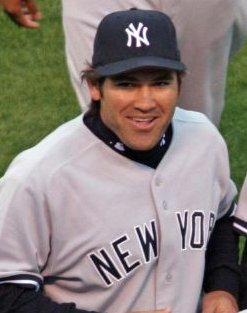
Johnny Damon played for both the Red Sox and the Yankees.

The Red Sox acquired starting pitcher Josh Beckett, who pitched a complete-game shutout for the Florida Marlins against the Yankees to end the 2003 World Series, in the 2005–2006 offseason. The Yankees would follow with their own off-season acquisition of former Red Sox outfielder Johnny Damon, a fan-favorite during his four years in Boston. Damon returned to Fenway Park the following May to a mix of cheers and boos as he tipped his helmet to the fans.

The Yankees completed a five-game sweep of the Red Sox at Fenway Park, evoking memories of 1978's "Boston Massacre". The Yankees pushed their division lead from 1 1/2 games up to 6 1/2 games over the second place Sox. Boston Globe columnist Dan Shaughnessy dubbed it the "Son of Massacre." The second game of the series, which the Yankees won 14–11, took four hours and 45 minutes to complete, making it the longest nine-inning game in MLB history. Months after the Yankees loss in the 2006 ALDS and Torre's decision to drop a struggling Alex Rodriguez to 8th in the lineup, Rodriguez in an interview with Sports Illustrated, claimed that he had preferred to go to the Red Sox before being traded to the Yankees. The incident would be one of contention between Torre and Rodriguez as noted in Torre's book, The Yankee Years.

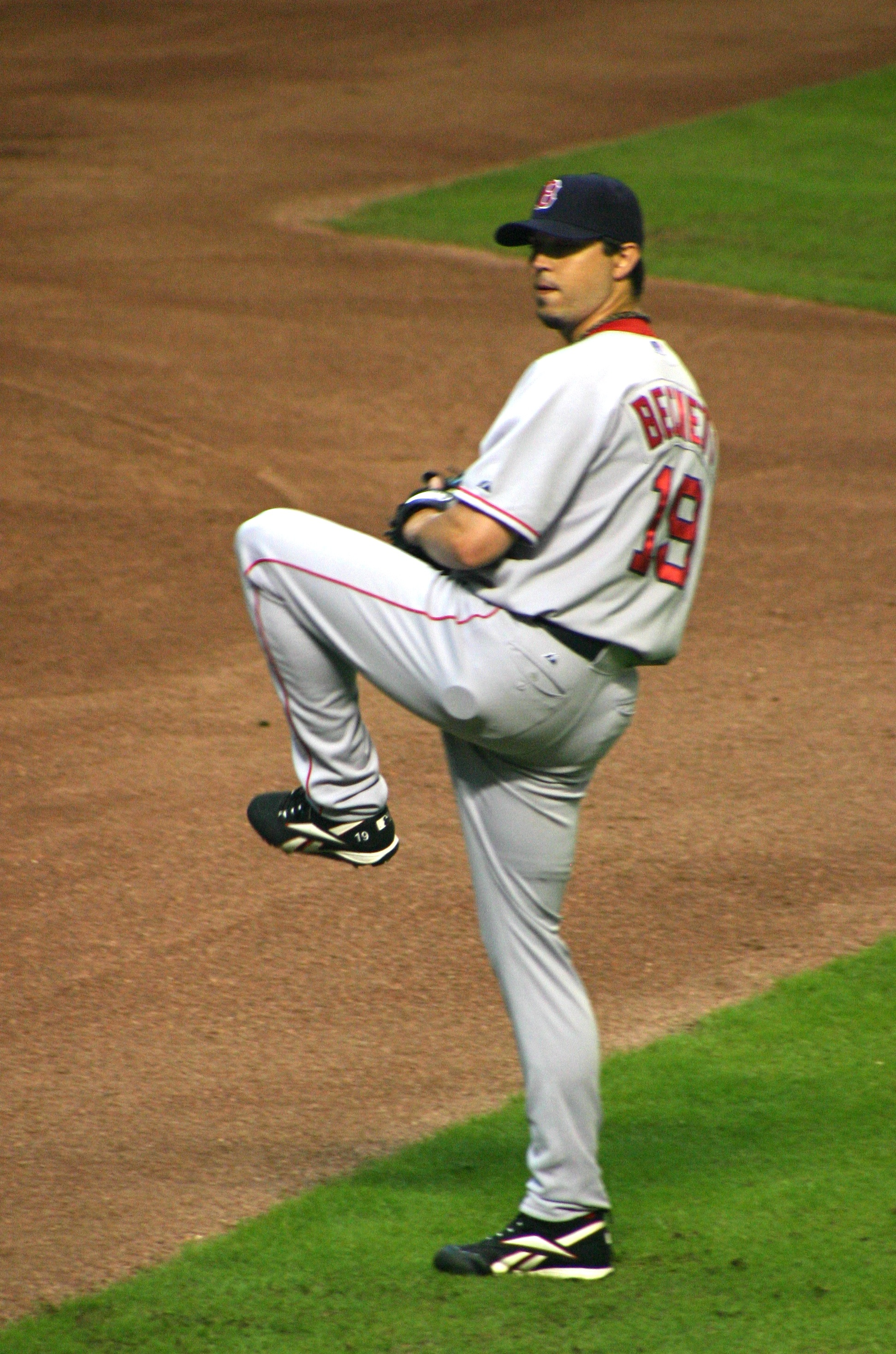
Josh Beckett, shown here with the Red Sox, pitched a complete game shutout against the Yankees to win the 2003 World Series for the Marlins.

During the third inning of a 2007 game at Fenway Park, Ramírez, J. D. Drew, Mike Lowell, and Jason Varitek hit four consecutive home runs off Yankees pitcher Chase Wright, powering a comeback from a three-run deficit and completing a three-game sweep of the Yankees at Fenway Park for the first time since 1990. By May, after long speculation about what team he would play for after retirement, Roger Clemens chose to return to the Yankees as opposed to the Red Sox (where he started his career) or the Houston Astros (his hometown and last team he played for). Clemens helped the Yankees overcome a 14 1/2-game deficit in the standings in late May to roar back to reach the playoffs again, however, this was not enough to win the division. On September 28, Boston won the AL East after a win against the Minnesota Twins and a loss by the Yankees against the Baltimore Orioles. This was the first AL East Championship for the Red Sox since 1995, ending the Yankees' nine-year reign in the division.

The Red Sox went on to sweep the Colorado Rockies in the World Series. Series MVP Mike Lowell remarks, upon receiving his trophy, that "the Red Sox are expected to win." Controversy erupted during the eighth inning of the final game when Alex Rodriguez's agent Scott Boras announced that Rodriguez had decided to opt out of his contract, in what was seen by many as an attempt by Boras to overshadow the series.

The 2007–08 off-season showed a war of words between management of both teams. Boston general manager Theo Epstein called Yankees pitcher Mike Mussina a "bad apple" for complaining about the Yankees' 2004 trip to Japan as the Red Sox were gearing up for their own trip there. Epstein claimed that Mussina had used it as a crutch during the season. Mussina retorted back saying "Yea, we used it as a crutch to win the division!" Later that month, Hank Steinbrenner, who had taken a bigger role with the Yankees operation from his father George, responded in a feisty manner to the popularity of Red Sox Nation in The New York Times supplemental Play Magazine: "'Red Sox Nation?' What a bunch of (expletive) that is. That was a creation of the Red Sox and ESPN, which is filled with Red Sox fans. Go anywhere in America and you won't see Red Sox hats and jackets, you'll see Yankee hats and jackets. This is a Yankee country. We're going to put the Yankees back on top and restore the universe to order." In response, Red Sox principal owner John W. Henry inducted Hank Steinbrenner into Red Sox Nation. Steinbrenner went on to praise Henry's handling of the Red Sox and said they would always be competitive under him.

In the 2008–09 off-season, first baseman Mark Teixeira signed an eight year, $180 million contract with the Yankees. Tony Massarotti of The Boston Globe summed up his feelings by calling it a "kick in the pants".

In August 2009, the Yankees defeated the Red Sox, 20–11, in which the total runs scored (31) was the most combined runs scored in a game in the history of the rivalry.

Both teams made the playoffs in 2009. During the ALDS, the Yankees defeated the Minnesota Twins to face the Los Angeles Angels who had knocked out the Red Sox. The Yankees beat the Angels and went on defeat the Philadelphia Phillies in the 2009 World Series, 4–2, to win their 27th World Series title in their first year in the new Yankee Stadium. Former Red Sox pitcher Pedro Martínez was the losing pitcher for the Phillies in the deciding Game 6.

=== 2010–2012: Yankees fall short, Red Sox collapse ===
In the final series of the 2010 season at Fenway Park, the Red Sox, struggling to get out of third place for much of the season, played the role of spoiler, knocking the Yankees out of first place in the American League East, relegating them to the wild-card for 2010.

In 2011, the Red Sox went 12–6 against the Yankees, including beating Yankees ace CC Sabathia four times during the season and sweeping two three-game series at Yankee Stadium, the first two series of three games of more where the Yankees have been swept at home since it opened in 2009. Critics and writers forecasted overwhelmingly that the Red Sox would win the 2011 World Series. The Red Sox spent a great deal to build the team in the off-season, and were about to sell at least two Red Sox as Most Valuable Player candidates by mid season. Following a disastrous first month, the Red Sox climbed in the standings. The Yankees claimed the AL East crown after the Red Sox's September struggles left them battling for the wild-card with the Rays, with whom they went into the season's final game tied. On September 28, the Tampa Bay Rays staged a dramatic comeback from 7–0 to win 8–7 over the Yankees in the 12th inning. Only three minutes earlier, Red Sox closer Jonathan Papelbon blew a 3–2 lead over the Orioles in the bottom of the 9th inning, handing a 4–3 walk-off victory to the Orioles. The Rays claimed the AL Wild Card and eliminated the Red Sox from the postseason. It marked the first time in baseball history that a 9-game lead had been blown in September, becoming the worst collapse in baseball history. Dan Shaughnessy of The Boston Globe said that "the greatest choke in baseball history...feels like revenge for 2004 and 2007."

The Red Sox hired outspoken manager Bobby Valentine, who had previously lost to the Yankees in the 2000 World Series during his tenure with the New York Mets, to take Francona's place. After his signing, Valentine immediately inserted himself into the rivalry when he said he hated the Yankees.

On the series of April 20–22, 2012, the Red Sox celebrated the 100th anniversary of Fenway Park against the Yankees, who they played to open up the park. Both teams wore their 1912 uniforms on April 20, which the Yankees won 6–2. The Yankees came back from down, 9–0, to win, 15–9, the next day, the largest deficit they have ever overcome. They won the season series 13–5, their best record against the Red Sox since 2001, when they also went 13–5 against them, and swept the final three-game series of the season at Yankee Stadium to clinch the AL East while the Red Sox finished last in the division for the first time since 1992 with their worst record since 1965. Valentine was fired soon after. Later in 2012, the Yankees acquired 2004 ALCS Game 7 winner Derek Lowe. He was the latest member of the 2004 team to later play for the Yankees. After the 2012 season, Kevin Youkilis, who the Red Sox traded to the Chicago White Sox earlier in the season, signed with the Yankees as a free agent. He had previously clashed with Joba Chamberlain when he was with Boston.

=== 2013–2016: Red Sox champions again ===
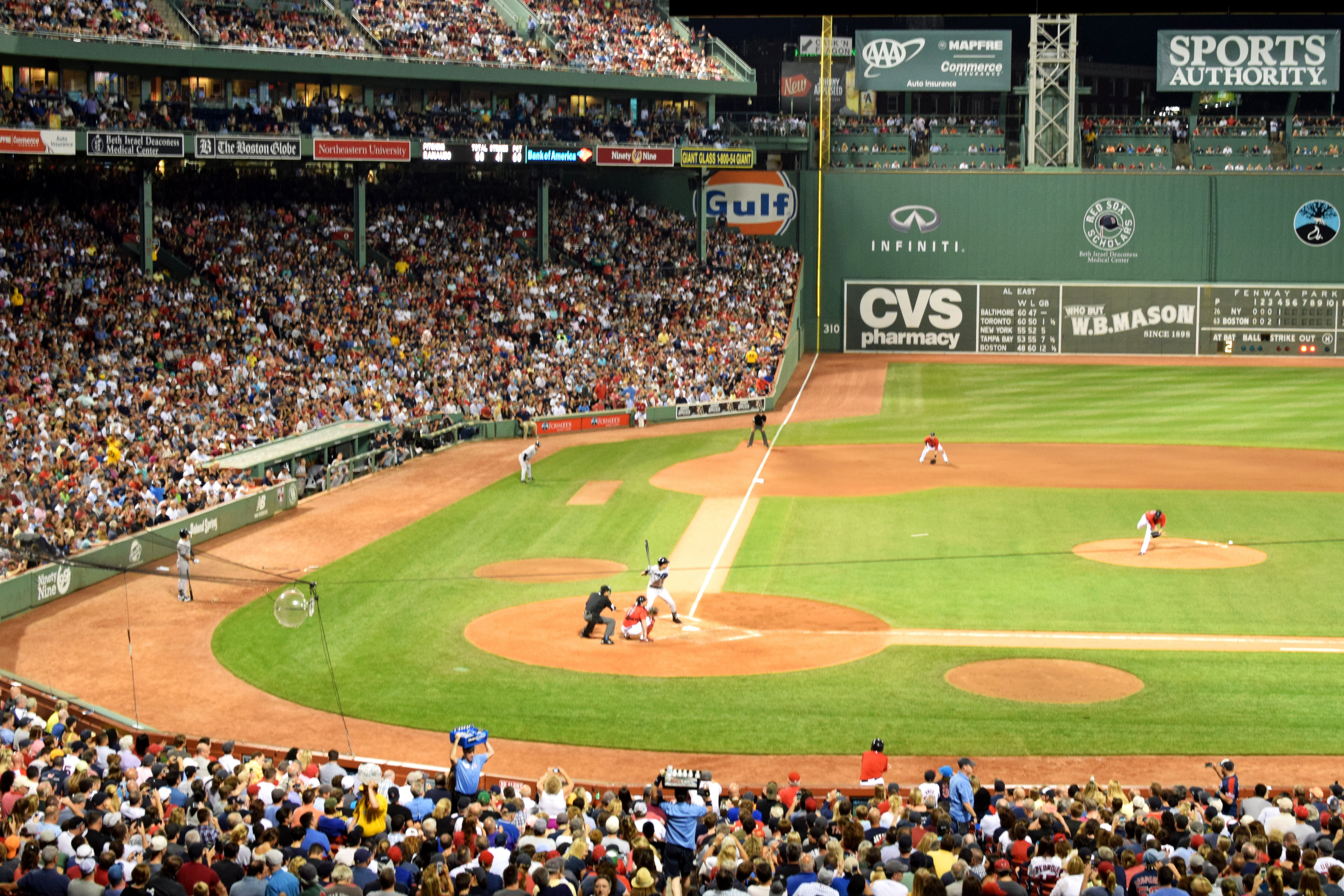
Derek Jeter bats for the Yankees at Fenway Park against the Red Sox in 2014

On April 16, 2013, the Yankees showed support to the victims of the Boston Marathon bombing, which occurred the day before, by holding a moment of silence prior to their game against the Arizona Diamondbacks. Following the third inning, the team further paid tribute by playing "Sweet Caroline", which is known as Fenway Park's traditional song, over the Yankee Stadium's loudspeakers. At the end of the year, the Red Sox took the regular season series over the Yankees 13–6. The Red Sox finished the season with the best record in the American League and went on to defeat the St. Louis Cardinals in the 2013 World Series to win their eighth World Series title, while the Yankees failed to make the playoffs. In 2014 the Yankees acquired Stephen Drew in exchange for Kelly Johnson in the first trade between the two teams since 1997. Both teams missed the playoffs in 2014, which was the first time in the wild card era.

To start the 2015 edition of the rivalry, the first game at Yankee Stadium on April 10 went into extra innings ended up being one of the longest games ever played – at 6 hours and 49 minutes – going 19 innings, with the Yankees tying the game three times in the bottom of the 9th, 14th, and 16th. The Red Sox won the game, 6–5. The Yankees won the 2015 season series 11–8, including going 7–2 at Fenway Park. Towards the end of the 2016 season in September, the Yankees headed to Fenway Park trailing the first place Red Sox by only four games. The Yankees ended up getting swept and blew late-inning leads in three of the four games, including giving up five runs in the ninth inning of the first game. The sweep has been dubbed "Boston Massacre II" in reference to the 1978 four-game sweep of the Red Sox by the Yankees at Fenway.

On September 28, Yankees first baseman and former Red Sox draft pick Mark Teixeira hit the final home run of his career, which was a walk-off grand slam off Boston Red Sox pitcher Joe Kelly. It was the first game-ending home run Teixeira had ever hit in a regular-season game. It was also the first – and as of 2018, the only – walk-off grand slam hit by any player at the new Yankee Stadium.

== 2017–present: Rebirth of the rivalry ==
In 2017, the Red Sox won the division by two games, forcing the Yankees into the Wild Card Game. However, both teams lost in the postseason to the eventual World Series champion Houston Astros.

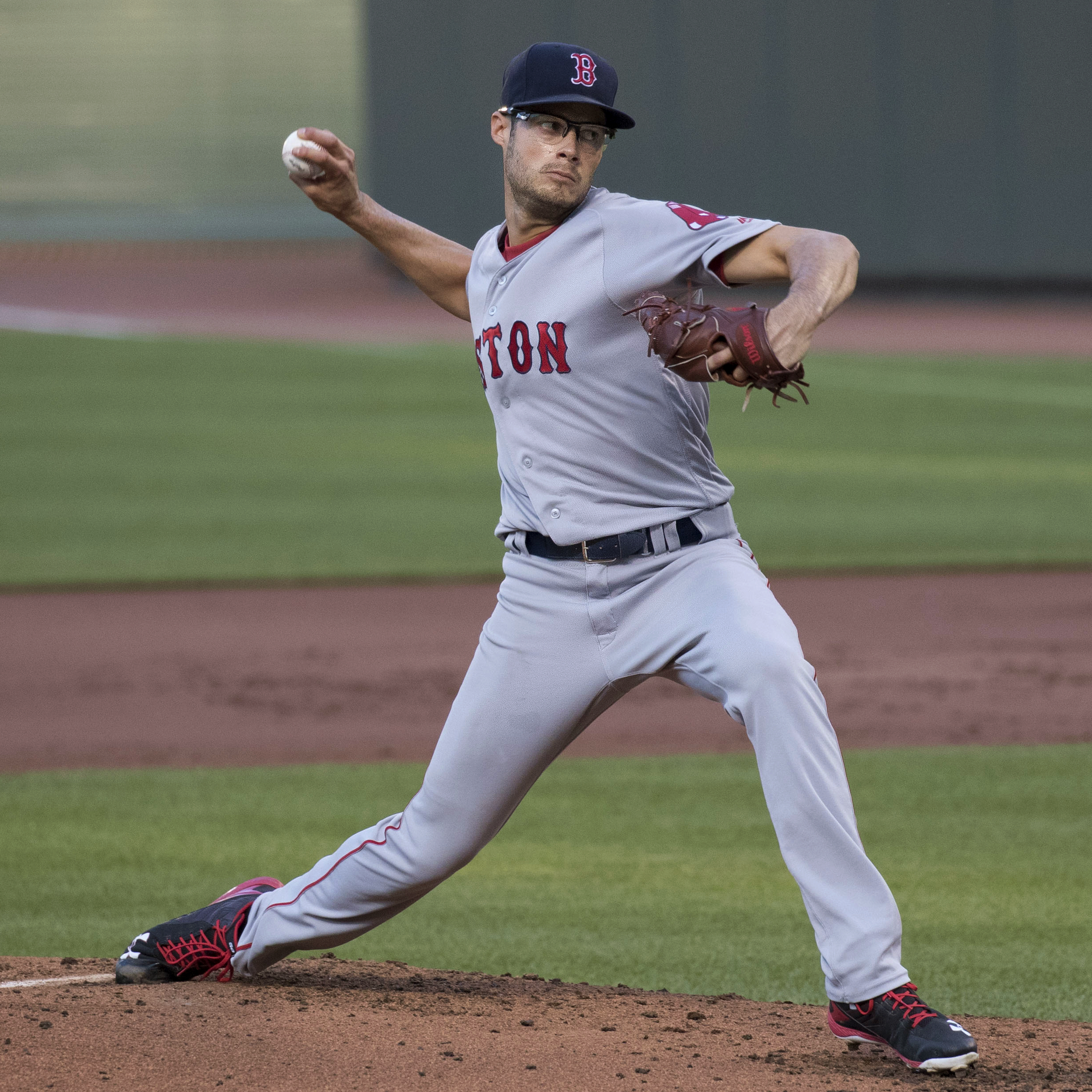
In 2018, Red Sox pitcher Joe Kelly gained notoriety for an altercation with Tyler Austin of the Yankees.

For the third time in the history of the rivalry (the previous two were 1930 and 1992), both teams had new managers to start the 2018 season. The Yankees hired Aaron Boone and the Red Sox hired Alex Cora, both former players of their respective teams. During an early-season game, a brawl erupted between both benches after Yankees first baseman Tyler Austin charged Red Sox pitcher Joe Kelly for throwing at him twice in response to Austin's slide at second base earlier in the game. It became a trending topic on Twitter and the MLB's YouTube channel video of the incident became one of the most viewed, and social media commentators saw the brawl as a spark of a reignited rivalry between the two teams. By the end of the 2018 regular season, both teams qualified for the postseason and both reached the 100-win mark. It was the first time that both teams won at least 100 games in the same season and, along with the Houston Astros, the first time the American League had three 100-game winners. Following the Yankees' victory in the AL Wild Card Game, the two faced each other in the 2018 ALDS. The Red Sox won the series 3–1, taking Games 3 and 4 in Yankee Stadium by a combined score of 20–4. Just like in the April brawl, this series became a Twitter trending topic.

In May 2018, MLB announced that the teams would play a two-game series during the 2019 season at London Stadium, in the first of a two-year deal to play regular-season games at the venue. The 2019 MLB London Series was the first time that the two sides have played each other in regular season play outside of either New York or Boston, and was also the first MLB regular-season games were played in Europe. The Yankees won both games in an offense heavy showing in which both teams combined for 50 runs scored in just 18 innings. The Yankees also won four of the five remaining series, pushing the Sox out of contention.

Due to the COVID-19 pandemic, the 2020 season was shortened to 60 games and ten meetings between the rivals, with the Yankees winning nine out of the ten games. The Yankees would finish the season 33–27, good for second place in the AL East, qualifying for the postseason, where they would eventually lose to the Tampa Bay Rays in the American League Division Series.

On January 25, 2021, the Yankees sent relief pitcher and New York City native Adam Ottavino, prospect Frank German, and cash considerations to the Red Sox for a player to be named later and cash considerations. This was the first trade between the two teams since 2014 and third since 1997. In 2021, the Red Sox acquired reliever Garrett Whitlock from the Yankees after they declined to protect him in the Rule 5 Draft.

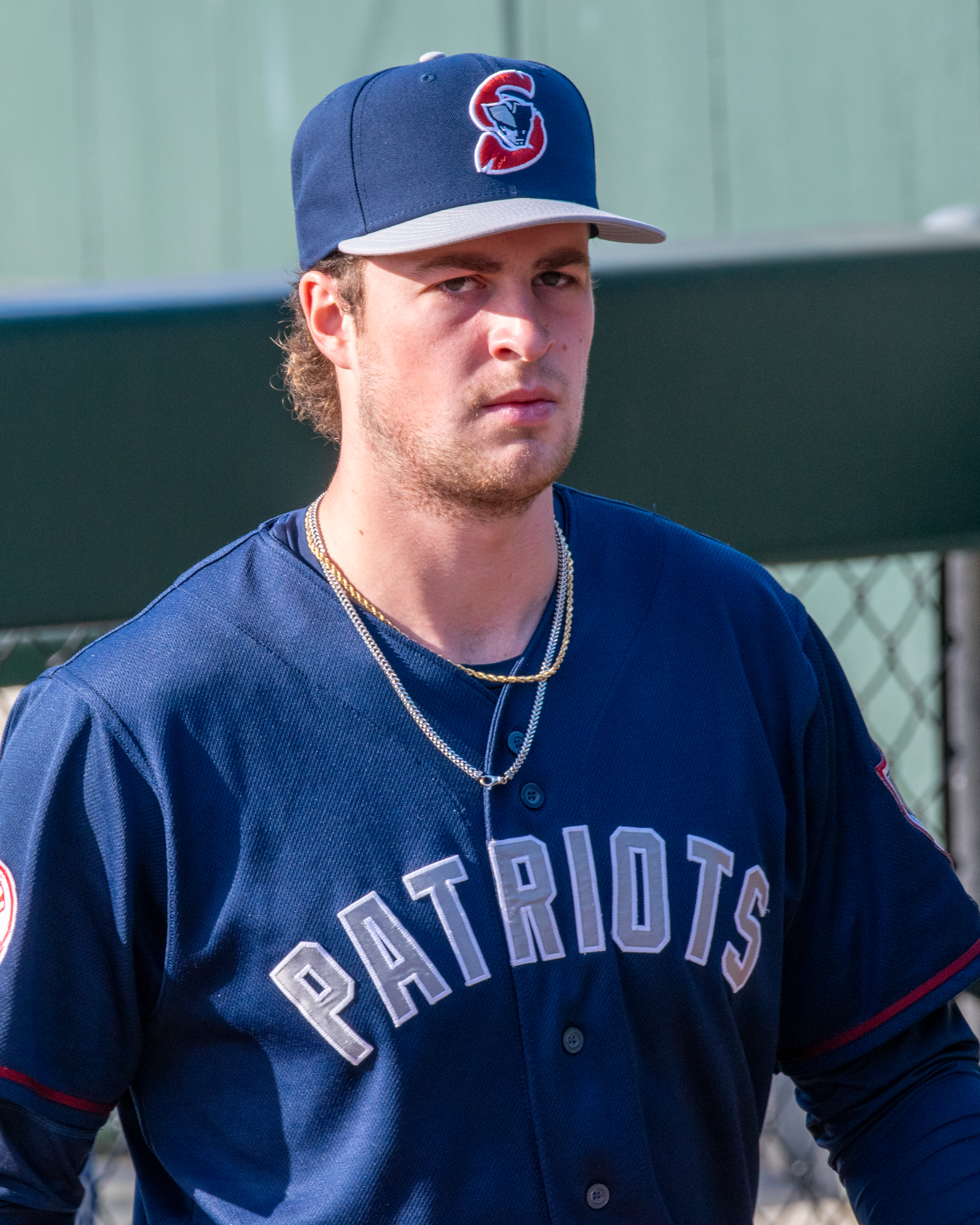
Massasschutes native Cam Schlittler threw shutouts against the Red Sox in back to back years in the playoffs.

The 2021 season series saw the Red Sox win the first seven meetings as they and the Tampa Bay Rays battled for the AL East lead. The Yankees were in the mix for a Wild Card spot. However, New York won nine of the final twelve meetings as Boston fell several games behind Tampa Bay. This put the Yankees and Red Sox squarely in the Wild Card race. On the final day of the season, each team was 91–70 and could clinch a Wild Card spot with a win. New York defeated Tampa Bay, while Boston defeated the Washington Nationals, setting up a meeting in the Wild Card game at Fenway Park. On October 5, the Red Sox beat the Yankees in the 2021 AL Wild Card Game, 6–2.

The Red Sox and Yankees faced off in the 2025 AL Wild Card Series. After the Red Sox won the first game, the Yankees won the final two games of the series, becoming the first team to win a best-of-three Wild Card Series after losing Game 1 since the format was introduced in 2022. The Yankees won the season series over Boston in 2026, 7-6. The deciding game on August 30, 2026, was won by the Yankees, 16-1.The two teams met again in a rematch in the 2026 AL Wild Card Series, which the Yankees won in a two-game sweep. Yankees pitcher Cam Schlittler pitched shutouts against Boston in both 2025 and 2026 Wild Card series and, through six career starts against the Red Sox, including the two postseason appearances, posted a 0.47 ERA with 49 strikeouts, becoming the first pitcher in modern Major League Baseball history to record a career ERA below 0.90 against a single opponent.

== Season-by-season results ==
Red Sox vs. Yankees Season-by-Season Results
1900s (Red Sox, 76–73–4)

Season	Season series		at Boston Americans/Red Sox	at NY Highlanders	Overall series	Notes
1903	Americans	13‍–‍7	Americans, 6‍–‍4	Americans, 7‍–‍3	Americans; 13‍–‍7	First year of organized Major League Baseball; Americans win 1903 World Series
1904	Americans	12‍–‍10‍–‍2	Tie, 6‍–‍6‍–‍2	Americans, 6‍–‍4	Americans; 25‍–‍17‍–‍2	Americans win three of four over Highlanders to close out season Americans win the AL Pennant by 1 1/2 games over Highlanders; No World Series held as NL Champion New York Giants refuse to participate
1905	Americans	13‍–‍8	Americans, 8‍–‍3	Tie, 5‍–‍5	Americans; 38‍–‍25‍–‍2	
1906	Highlanders	17‍–‍5‍–‍1	Highlanders, 9‍–‍2‍–‍1	Highlanders, 8‍–‍3	Americans; 43‍–‍42‍–‍3	Highlanders win 11 straight meetings between May and September
1907	Highlanders	12‍–‍8‍–‍1	Highlanders, 6‍–‍5	Highlanders, 6‍–‍3‍–‍1	Highlanders; 54‍–‍51‍–‍4	Americans change their name to "Red Sox"
1908	Red Sox	12‍–‍10	Highlanders, 6‍–‍5	Red Sox, 7‍–‍4	Highlanders; 64‍–‍63‍–‍4	
1909	Red Sox	13‍–‍9	Red Sox, 7‍–‍4	Red Sox, 6‍–‍5	Red Sox; 76‍–‍73‍–‍4	

1910s (Red Sox, 115–94–3)

Season	Season series		at Boston Red Sox	at New York Highlanders/Yankees	Overall series	Notes
1910	Highlanders	13‍–‍9‍–‍1	Highlanders, 7‍–‍6	Highlanders, 6‍–‍3‍–‍1	Highlanders; 86‍–‍85‍–‍5	
1911	Red Sox	12‍–‍10	Highlanders, 7‍–‍4	Red Sox, 8‍–‍3	Red Sox; 97‍–‍96‍–‍5	
1912	Red Sox	19‍–‍2	Red Sox, 9‍–‍2	Red Sox, 10‍–‍0	Red Sox; 116‍–‍98‍–‍5	Red Sox open Fenway Park; Red Sox win 17 straight meetings from October 1911 to July 1912; Red Sox win 1912 World Series; Red Sox's .905 win percentage makes 1912 the most one-sided season series in the history of the rivalry
1913	Red Sox	14‍–‍6‍–‍1	Red Sox, 7‍–‍4	Red Sox, 7‍–‍2‍–‍1	Red Sox; 130‍–‍104‍–‍6	Highlanders change their name to "Yankees"
1914	Tie	11‍–‍11	Yankees, 6‍–‍5	Red Sox, 6‍–‍5	Red Sox; 141‍–‍115‍–‍6	
1915	Yankees	12‍–‍10	Yankees, 7‍–‍4	Red Sox, 6‍–‍5	Red Sox; 151‍–‍127‍–‍6	Red Sox win 1915 World Series
1916	Tie	11‍–‍11	Red Sox, 6‍–‍5	Yankees, 6‍–‍5	Red Sox; 162‍–‍138‍–‍6	Red Sox win 1916 World Series
1917	Red Sox	13‍–‍9‍–‍1	Red Sox, 6‍–‍5‍–‍1	Red Sox, 7‍–‍4	Red Sox; 175‍–‍147‍–‍7	
1918	Yankees	11‍–‍6	Tie, 4‍–‍4	Yankees, 7‍–‍2	Red Sox; 181‍–‍158‍–‍7	Red Sox win 1918 World Series, their last until 2004
1919	Red Sox	10‍–‍9	Tie, 4‍–‍4	Red Sox, 6‍–‍5	Red Sox; 191‍–‍167‍–‍7	

1920s (Yankees, 149–71–1)

Season	Season series		at Boston Red Sox	at New York Yankees	Overall series	Notes
1920	Yankees	13‍–‍9	Yankees, 6‍–‍5	Yankees, 7‍–‍4	Red Sox; 200‍–‍180‍–‍7	Babe Ruth's first season with the Yankees; Alleged start to the Curse of the Bambino
1921	Yankees	15‍–‍7	Red Sox, 6‍–‍5	Yankees, 10‍–‍1	Red Sox; 207‍–‍195‍–‍7	Yankees win first AL pennant, lose 1921 World Series
1922	Red Sox	13‍–‍9	Red Sox, 7‍–‍4	Red Sox, 6‍–‍5	Red Sox; 220‍–‍204‍–‍7	Yankees lose 1922 World Series
1923	Yankees	14‍–‍8	Yankees, 6‍–‍5	Yankees, 8‍–‍3	Red Sox; 228‍–‍218‍–‍7	Yankees open the original Yankee Stadium; Yankees win 1923 World Series for first title
1924	Yankees	17‍–‍5‍–‍1	Yankees, 8‍–‍3	Yankees, 9‍–‍2‍–‍1	Yankees; 235‍–‍233‍–‍8	Yankees sweep a 4-game series in Boston on September 8–11 to take a 235–233–8 lead in the series, a lead the Yankees would never relinquish
1925	Yankees	13‍–‍9	Yankees, 6‍–‍5	Yankees, 7‍–‍4	Yankees; 248‍–‍242‍–‍8	
1926	Yankees	17‍–‍5	Yankees, 8‍–‍2	Yankees, 9‍–‍3	Yankees; 265‍–‍247‍–‍8	Yankees lose 1926 World Series
1927	Yankees	18‍–‍4	Yankees, 9‍–‍3	Yankees, 9‍–‍1	Yankees; 283‍–‍251‍–‍8	Yankees win 11 straight meetings from May to August; Yankees win 1927 World Series
1928	Yankees	16‍–‍6	Yankees, 9‍–‍2	Yankees, 7‍–‍4	Yankees; 299‍–‍257‍–‍8	Yankees win 1928 World Series
1929	Yankees	17‍–‍5	Yankees, 8‍–‍3	Yankees, 9‍–‍2	Yankees; 316‍–‍262‍–‍8	

1930s (Yankees, 136–80–3)

Season	Season series		at Boston Red Sox	at New York Yankees	Overall series	Notes
1930	Yankees	16‍–‍6	Yankees, 8‍–‍3	Yankees, 8‍–‍3	Yankees; 332‍–‍268‍–‍8	
1931	Yankees	16‍–‍6	Yankees, 7‍–‍4	Yankees, 9‍–‍2	Yankees; 348‍–‍274‍–‍8	
1932	Yankees	17‍–‍5	Yankees, 7‍–‍4	Yankees, 10‍–‍1	Yankees; 365‍–‍279‍–‍8	Yankees win 13 straight home meetings from July 1931 to June 1932; Yankees win 1932 World Series
1933	Yankees	14‍–‍8	Red Sox, 6‍–‍5	Yankees, 9‍–‍2	Yankees; 379‍–‍287‍–‍8	
1934	Yankees	12‍–‍10	Red Sox, 6‍–‍5	Yankees, 7‍–‍4	Yankees; 391‍–‍297‍–‍8	
1935	Yankees	12‍–‍9	Yankees, 7‍–‍4	Tie, 5‍–‍5	Yankees; 403‍–‍306‍–‍8	
1936	Yankees	15‍–‍7‍–‍1	Yankees, 6‍–‍5‍–‍1	Yankees, 9‍–‍2	Yankees; 418‍–‍313‍–‍9	Yankees win 1936 World Series
1937	Yankees	15‍–‍7	Yankees, 8‍–‍3	Yankees, 7‍–‍4	Yankees; 433‍–‍320‍–‍9	Yankees win 1937 World Series
1938	Tie	11‍–‍11‍–‍1	Red Sox, 7‍–‍4	Yankees, 7‍–‍4‍–‍1	Yankees; 444‍–‍331‍–‍10	Yankees win 1938 World Series
1939	Red Sox	11‍–‍8‍–‍1	Red Sox, 5‍–‍3‍–‍1	Red Sox, 6‍–‍5	Yankees; 452‍–‍342‍–‍11	Yankees win 1939 World Series

1940s (Yankees, 122–98–2)

Season	Season series		at Boston Red Sox	at New York Yankees	Overall series	Notes
1940	Yankees	13‍–‍9	Yankees, 6‍–‍5	Yankees, 7‍–‍4	Yankees; 465‍–‍351‍–‍11	
1941	Yankees	13‍–‍9‍–‍1	Red Sox, 6‍–‍5	Yankees, 8‍–‍3‍–‍1	Yankees; 478‍–‍360‍–‍12	Joe DiMaggio had 56-game hitting streak Ted Williams batted .406; Yankees win 1941 World Series
1942	Red Sox	12‍–‍10	Red Sox, 6‍–‍5	Red Sox, 6‍–‍5	Yankees; 488‍–‍372‍–‍12	Yankees lose 1942 World Series
1943	Yankees	17‍–‍5‍–‍1	Yankees, 8‍–‍3‍–‍1	Yankees, 9‍–‍2	Yankees; 505‍–‍377‍–‍13	Yankees win 1943 World Series
1944	Tie	11‍–‍11	Red Sox, 8‍–‍3	Yankees, 8‍–‍3	Yankees; 516‍–‍388‍–‍13	
1945	Yankees	16‍–‍6	Yankees, 7‍–‍4	Yankees, 9‍–‍2	Yankees; 532‍–‍394‍–‍13	
1946	Red Sox	14‍–‍8	Red Sox, 8‍–‍3	Red Sox, 6‍–‍5	Yankees; 540‍–‍408‍–‍13	Red Sox finish ahead of Yankees in the standings for first time since selling Babe Ruth; Red Sox lose 1946 World Series
1947	Yankees	13‍–‍9	Red Sox, 6‍–‍5	Yankees, 8‍–‍3	Yankees; 553‍–‍417‍–‍13	Yankees win 1947 World Series
1948	Red Sox	14‍–‍8	Red Sox, 9‍–‍2	Yankees, 6‍–‍5	Yankees; 561‍–‍431‍–‍13	Both teams in hotly-contested pennant race with Cleveland Indians. Red Sox lose to Indians in AL tie-breaker game
1949	Yankees	13‍–‍9	Yankees, 6‍–‍5	Yankees, 7‍–‍4	Yankees; 574‍–‍440‍–‍13	Yankees beat Red Sox in season's final 2 games to win pennant Yankees win 1949 World Series

1950s (Yankees, 126–93–1)

Season	Season series		at Boston Red Sox	at New York Yankees	Overall series	Notes
1950	Yankees	13‍–‍9	Red Sox, 6‍–‍5	Yankees, 8‍–‍3	Yankees; 587‍–‍449‍–‍13	Yankees win 1950 World Series
1951	Tie	11‍–‍11	Red Sox, 9‍–‍2	Yankees, 9‍–‍2	Yankees; 598‍–‍460‍–‍13	Yankees win 1951 World Series
1952	Yankees	14‍–‍8	Yankees, 6‍–‍5	Yankees, 8‍–‍3	Yankees; 612‍–‍468‍–‍13	Yankees win 1952 World Series
1953	Yankees	11‍–‍10	Tie, 5‍–‍5	Yankees, 6‍–‍5	Yankees; 623‍–‍478‍–‍13	Yankees win 1953 World Series, their fifth straight title
1954	Yankees	13‍–‍9	Red Sox, 6‍–‍5	Yankees, 8‍–‍3	Yankees; 636‍–‍487‍–‍13	
1955	Yankees	14‍–‍8	Yankees, 7‍–‍4	Yankees, 7‍–‍4	Yankees; 650‍–‍495‍–‍13	Yankees lose 1955 World Series
1956	Yankees	14‍–‍8	Yankees, 7‍–‍4	Yankees, 7‍–‍4	Yankees; 664‍–‍503‍–‍13	Yankees win 1956 World Series
1957	Yankees	14‍–‍8	Yankees, 8‍–‍3	Yankees, 6‍–‍5	Yankees; 678‍–‍511‍–‍13	Yankees lose 1957 World Series
1958	Yankees	13‍–‍9‍–‍1	Yankees, 6‍–‍5	Yankees, 7‍–‍4‍–‍1	Yankees; 691‍–‍520‍–‍14	Yankees win 1958 World Series
1959	Red Sox	13‍–‍9	Red Sox, 8‍–‍3	Yankees, 6‍–‍5	Yankees; 700‍–‍533‍–‍14	

1960s (Yankees, 101–83)

Season	Season series		at Boston Red Sox	at New York Yankees	Overall series	Notes
1960	Yankees	15‍–‍7	Yankees, 7‍–‍4	Yankees, 8‍–‍3	Yankees; 715‍–‍540‍–‍14	Yankees lose 1960 World Series
1961	Yankees	13‍–‍5	Yankees, 5‍–‍4	Yankees, 8‍–‍1	Yankees; 728‍–‍545‍–‍14	Roger Maris breaks Babe Ruth's single-season home run record vs. Red Sox on season's last day MLB expansion reduces schedule to 18 meetings per year Yankees win 1961 World Series
1962	Yankees	12‍–‍6	Yankees, 6‍–‍3	Yankees, 6‍–‍3	Yankees; 740‍–‍551‍–‍14	Yankees win 1962 World Series
1963	Yankees	12‍–‍6	Yankees, 5‍–‍4	Yankees, 7‍–‍2	Yankees; 752‍–‍557‍–‍14	Yankees lose 1963 World Series
1964	Tie	9‍–‍9	Red Sox, 5‍–‍4	Yankees, 5‍–‍4	Yankees; 761‍–‍566‍–‍14	Yankees lose 1964 World Series
1965	Tie	9‍–‍9	Yankees, 5‍–‍4	Red Sox, 5‍–‍4	Yankees; 770‍–‍575‍–‍14	Red Sox post winning road record vs. Yankees for first time since 1946
1966	Yankees	10‍–‍8	Yankees, 6‍–‍3	Red Sox, 5‍–‍4	Yankees; 780‍–‍583‍–‍14	
1967	Red Sox	12‍–‍6	Red Sox, 6‍–‍3	Red Sox, 6‍–‍3	Yankees; 786‍–‍595‍–‍14	Red Sox lose 1967 World Series
1968	Red Sox	10‍–‍8	Yankees, 5‍–‍4	Red Sox, 6‍–‍3	Yankees; 794‍–‍605‍–‍14	Red Sox win consecutive season series for the first time since 1911‍–‍13
1969	Red Sox	11‍–‍7	Red Sox, 6‍–‍3	Red Sox, 5‍–‍4	Yankees; 801‍–‍616‍–‍14	

1970s (Red Sox, 89–79)

Season	Season series		at New York Yankees	at Boston Red Sox	Overall series	Notes
1970	Red Sox	10‍–‍8	Red Sox, 5‍–‍4	Red Sox, 5‍–‍4	Yankees; 809‍–‍626‍–‍14	
1971	Yankees	11‍–‍7	Red Sox, 5‍–‍4	Yankees, 7‍–‍2	Yankees; 820‍–‍633‍–‍14	
1972	Tie	9‍–‍9	Red Sox, 7‍–‍2	Yankees, 7‍–‍2	Yankees; 829‍–‍642‍–‍14	
1973	Red Sox	14‍–‍4	Red Sox, 8‍–‍1	Red Sox, 6‍–‍3	Yankees; 833‍–‍656‍–‍14	Munson, Fisk brawl
1974	Red Sox	11‍–‍7	Red Sox, 7‍–‍2	Yankees, 5‍–‍4	Yankees; 840‍–‍667‍–‍14	Red Sox win 11 straight home meetings from August 1973 to July 1974
1975	Red Sox	11‍–‍5	Red Sox, 5‍–‍4	Red Sox, 6‍–‍1	Yankees; 845‍–‍678‍–‍14	Red Sox lose 1975 World Series
1976	Yankees	11‍–‍7	Red Sox, 5‍–‍4	Yankees, 7‍–‍2	Yankees; 856‍–‍685‍–‍14	Piniella, Fisk brawl Yankees lose 1976 World Series
1977	Red Sox	8‍–‍7	Red Sox, 6‍–‍1	Yankees, 6‍–‍2	Yankees; 863‍–‍693‍–‍14	MLB expansion reduces season series to 15 meetings per year Yankees win 1977 World Series
1978	Yankees	9‍–‍7	Yankees, 6‍–‍3	Red Sox, 4‍–‍3	Yankees; 872‍–‍700‍–‍14	Yankees overcome a 14-game deficit to Red Sox including a 4-game sweep in Fenway in September ("Boston Massacre"); Teams tie for first in the AL East, Yankees defeat Red Sox in tiebreaker game Yankees win 1978 World Series
1979	Yankees	8‍–‍5	Yankees, 4‍–‍2	Yankees, 4‍–‍3	Yankees; 880‍–‍705‍–‍14	Schedule reduced to 13 meetings per year as MLB implements "balanced schedule."

1980s (Yankees, 63–60)

Season	Season series		at New York Yankees	at Boston Red Sox	Overall series	Notes
1980	Yankees	10‍–‍3	Yankees, 7‍–‍0	Tie, 3‍–‍3	Yankees; 890‍–‍708‍–‍14	Yankees sweep all games in Boston for first time
1981	Tie	3‍–‍3	Red Sox, 2‍–‍1	Yankees, 2‍–‍1	Yankees; 893‍–‍711‍–‍14	Strike-shortened season Yankees lose 1981 World Series
1982	Red Sox	7‍–‍6	Red Sox, 4‍–‍3	Tie, 3‍–‍3	Yankees; 899‍–‍718‍–‍14	
1983	Red Sox	7‍–‍6	Red Sox, 4‍–‍2	Yankees, 4‍–‍3	Yankees; 905‍–‍725‍–‍14	
1984	Red Sox	7‍–‍6	Yankees, 4‍–‍3	Red Sox, 4‍–‍2	Yankees; 911‍–‍732‍–‍14	
1985	Yankees	8‍–‍5	Tie, 3‍–‍3	Yankees, 5‍–‍2	Yankees; 919‍–‍737‍–‍14	Red Sox win the first five meetings, Yankees win the next eight.
1986	Yankees	8‍–‍5	Yankees, 6‍–‍1	Red Sox, 4‍–‍2	Yankees; 927‍–‍742‍–‍14	Red Sox lose 1986 World Series
1987	Red Sox	7‍–‍6	Red Sox, 4‍–‍2	Yankees, 4‍–‍3	Yankees; 933‍–‍749‍–‍14	
1988	Red Sox	9‍–‍4	Red Sox, 5‍–‍2	Red Sox, 4‍–‍2	Yankees; 937‍–‍758‍–‍14	
1989	Red Sox	7‍–‍6	Red Sox, 4‍–‍2	Yankees, 4‍–‍3	Yankees; 943‍–‍765‍–‍14	

1990s (Yankees, 68–61)

Season	Season series		at Boston Red Sox	at New York Yankees	Overall series	Notes
1990	Red Sox	9‍–‍4	Red Sox, 7‍–‍0	Yankees, 4‍–‍2	Yankees; 947‍–‍774‍–‍14	
1991	Yankees	7‍–‍6	Yankees, 4‍–‍2	Red Sox, 4‍–‍3	Yankees; 954‍–‍780‍–‍14	
1992	Red Sox	7‍–‍6	Red Sox, 5‍–‍2	Yankees, 4‍–‍2	Yankees; 960‍–‍787‍–‍14	
1993	Yankees	7‍–‍6	Tie, 3‍–‍3	Yankees, 4‍–‍3	Yankees; 967‍–‍793‍–‍14	
1994	Yankees	7‍–‍3	Yankees, 3‍–‍1	Yankees, 4‍–‍2	Yankees; 974‍–‍796‍–‍14	Strike-shortened season. Strike cancels postseason. Yankees had best regular season record in American League; MLB adds Wild Card, allowing for both teams to make the postseason in the same year.
1995	Yankees	8‍–‍5	Red Sox, 4‍–‍2	Yankees, 6‍–‍1	Yankees; 982‍–‍801‍–‍14	Both teams qualify for postseason for the first time.
1996	Red Sox	7‍–‍6	Red Sox, 5‍–‍2	Yankees, 4‍–‍2	Yankees; 988‍–‍808‍–‍14	Yankees win 1996 World Series
1997	Yankees	8‍–‍4	Yankees, 4‍–‍2	Yankees, 4‍–‍2	Yankees; 996‍–‍812‍–‍14	
1998	Yankees	7‍–‍5	Yankees, 4‍–‍2	Tie, 3‍–‍3	Yankees; 1,003‍–‍817‍–‍14	Yankees win 114 games to set AL record (later broken); Yankees win 1998 World Series
1999	Red Sox	8‍–‍4	Red Sox, 4‍–‍2	Red Sox, 4‍–‍2	Yankees; 1,007‍–‍825‍–‍14	
1999 ALCS	Yankees	4‍–‍1	Yankees, 2‍–‍1	Yankees, 2‍–‍0	Yankees; 1,011‍–‍826‍–‍14	First postseason meeting, the Red Sox hand the Yankees their only defeat in the 1999 postseason in Game 3. Yankees go on to win 1999 World Series

2000s (Yankees, 104–90)

Season	Season series		at Boston Red Sox	at New York Yankees	Overall series	Notes
2000	Yankees	7‍–‍6	Yankees, 5‍–‍2	Red Sox, 4‍–‍2	Yankees; 1,018‍–‍832‍–‍14	Yankees win 2000 World Series
2001	Yankees	13‍–‍5	Yankees, 5‍–‍4	Yankees, 8‍–‍1	Yankees; 1,031‍–‍837‍–‍14	MLB changed to an unbalanced schedule in 2001, resulting in 18‍–‍19 meetings per year Yankees lose 2001 World Series
2002	Yankees	10‍–‍9	Tie, 5‍–‍5	Yankees, 5‍–‍4	Yankees; 1,041‍–‍846‍–‍14	
2003	Yankees	10‍–‍9	Yankees, 5‍–‍4	Tie, 5‍–‍5	Yankees; 1,051‍–‍855‍–‍14	
2003 ALCS	Yankees	4‍–‍3	Yankees, 2‍–‍1	Tie, 2‍–‍2	Yankees; 1,055‍–‍858‍–‍14	Game 7 ends on Aaron Boone's 11th inning home run. Rally from a 5‍–‍2 deficit in Game 7 while down to their last five outs. Yankees go on to lose 2003 World Series
2004	Red Sox	11‍–‍8	Red Sox, 7‍–‍3	Yankees, 5‍–‍4	Yankees; 1,063‍–‍869‍–‍14	
2004 ALCS	Red Sox	4‍–‍3	Red Sox, 2‍–‍1	Tie, 2‍–‍2	Yankees; 1,066‍–‍873‍–‍14	Red Sox overcome 3‍–‍0 series deficit. Overcome ninth inning deficit in Game 4, and a two-run deficit in the eighth inning of Game 5 to start the comeback. Red Sox go on to win 2004 World Series, their first since 1918.
2005	Yankees	10‍–‍9	Tie, 5‍–‍5	Yankees, 5‍–‍4	Yankees; 1,076‍–‍882‍–‍14	Over the final two days of the regular season, the Yankees clinch the AL East, while the Red Sox clinch the AL Wild Card in consecutive head-to-head games.
2006	Yankees	11‍–‍8	Yankees, 7‍–‍2	Red Sox, 6‍–‍4	Yankees; 1,087‍–‍890‍–‍14	Yankees sweep a 5-game series at Fenway ("Son of Massacre")
2007	Yankees	10‍–‍8	Red Sox, 5‍–‍4	Yankees, 6‍–‍3	Yankees; 1,097‍–‍898‍–‍14	Red Sox win 2007 World Series
2008	Tie	9‍–‍9	Yankees, 5‍–‍4	Red Sox, 5‍–‍4	Yankees; 1,106‍–‍907‍–‍14	
2009	Tie	9‍–‍9	Red Sox, 7‍–‍2	Yankees, 7‍–‍2	Yankees; 1,115‍–‍916‍–‍14	Yankees open the new Yankee Stadium; Red Sox win first eight meetings, Yankees win nine of next ten Yankees win 2009 World Series

2010s (Yankees, 100–91)

Season	Season series		at Boston Red Sox	at New York Yankees	Overall series	Notes
2010	Tie	9‍–‍9	Yankees, 5‍–‍4	Red Sox, 5‍–‍4	Yankees; 1,124‍–‍925‍–‍14	
2011	Red Sox	12‍–‍6	Red Sox, 5‍–‍4	Red Sox, 7‍–‍2	Yankees; 1,130‍–‍937‍–‍14	Red Sox miss playoffs despite having 9-game lead in September
2012	Yankees	13‍–‍5	Yankees, 7‍–‍2	Yankees, 6‍–‍3	Yankees; 1,143‍–‍942‍–‍14	
2013	Red Sox	13‍–‍6	Red Sox, 6‍–‍3	Red Sox, 7‍–‍3	Yankees; 1,149‍–‍955‍–‍14	Red Sox win 2013 World Series; Both AL and NL having balanced teams leads to a balanced schedule of 19 games per season.
2014	Yankees	12‍–‍7	Yankees, 6‍–‍3	Yankees, 6‍–‍4	Yankees; 1,161‍–‍962‍–‍14	Both teams miss postseason for first time since 1993
2015	Yankees	11‍–‍8	Yankees, 7‍–‍2	Red Sox, 6‍–‍4	Yankees; 1,172‍–‍970‍–‍14	Red Sox win 19-inning game over Yankees on April 10
2016	Red Sox	11‍–‍8	Red Sox, 8‍–‍2	Yankees, 6‍–‍3	Yankees; 1,180‍–‍981‍–‍14	Red Sox sweep 4-game series in September ("Boston Massacre II")
2017	Yankees	11‍–‍8	Yankees, 5‍–‍4	Yankees, 6‍–‍4	Yankees; 1,191‍–‍989‍–‍14	
2018	Red Sox	10‍–‍9	Red Sox, 7‍–‍3	Yankees, 6‍–‍3	Yankees; 1,200‍–‍999‍–‍14	Red Sox sweep four-game series in August to extend AL East lead from 5 1/2 to 9 1/2, effectively taking control of the division. Both teams win 100 games (Red Sox 108, Yankees 100) for first time ever
2018 ALDS	Red Sox	3‍–‍1	Tie, 1‍–‍1	Red Sox, 2‍–‍0	Yankees; 1,201‍–‍1,002‍–‍14	Red Sox win Game 3, 16–1, the largest postseason loss in Yankees history. Red Sox 2B Brock Holt hits for the cycle in this game, the first by any player in a postseason game. Red Sox go on to win 2018 World Series.
2019	Yankees	14‍–‍5	Yankees, 6‍–‍4	Yankees, 8‍–‍1	Yankees; 1,215‍–‍1,007‍–‍14	The teams played two games in London (these were officially Red Sox home games and listed in the "at Boston Red Sox" column). The Yankees won both of these games. Most wins for Yankees in season series since 1960.

2020s (Yankees, 57–49)

Season	Season series		at Boston Red Sox	at New York Yankees	Overall series	Notes
2020	Yankees	9‍–‍1	Yankees, 2‍–‍1	Yankees, 7‍–‍0	Yankees; 1,224‍–‍1,008‍–‍14	Season shortened to 60 games (with 10 meetings) due to COVID-19 pandemic. Yankees win 12 straight meetings (September 2019 to September 2020). With a .900 win percentage, this was the most one-sided season series for the Yankees in the history of the rivalry and the most one-sided season series for either team since 1912.
2021	Red Sox	10‍–‍9	Red Sox, 6‍–‍4	Yankees, 5‍–‍4	Yankees; 1,233‍–‍1,018‍–‍14	Red Sox win 8 straight meetings (September 2020 to July 2021) immediately following Yankees' 12-game winning streak in the series.
2021 ALWC	Red Sox	1‍–‍0	Red Sox, 1‍–‍0	–	Yankees; 1,233‍–‍1,019‍–‍14	First meeting in the Wild Card Game since the round was added in 2012.
2022	Yankees	13‍–‍6	Yankees, 5‍–‍4	Yankees, 8‍–‍2	Yankees; 1,246‍–‍1,025‍–‍14	
2023	Red Sox	9‍–‍4	Red Sox, 4‍–‍3	Red Sox, 5‍–‍1	Yankees; 1,250‍–‍1,034‍–‍14	Schedule structure modified this season to allow every team to play one series against every interleague team. This reduced the number of meetings from 19 to 13 per season.
2024	Yankees	7‍–‍6	Tie, 3‍–‍3	Yankees, 4‍–‍3	Yankees; 1,257‍–‍1,040‍–‍14	Yankees lose 2024 World Series
2025	Red Sox	9‍–‍4	Red Sox, 4‍–‍2	Red Sox, 5‍–‍2	Yankees; 1,261‍–‍1,049‍–‍14	
2025 ALWCS	Yankees	2‍–‍1	–	Yankees, 2‍–‍1	Yankees; 1,263‍–‍1,050‍–‍14	First meeting in the Wild Card Series since the round was added in 2022.
2026	Yankees	7‍–‍6	Red Sox, 4‍–‍3	Yankees, 4‍–‍2	Yankees; 1,270‍–‍1,056‍–‍14	
2026 ALWCS	Yankees	2‍–‍0	–	Yankees, 2‍–‍0	Yankees; 1,272‍–‍1,056‍–‍14	Yankees outscore Red Sox 18–2 in two game sweep of the Wild Card Series

Summary of Results

Season	Season series		at Boston Red Sox	at New York Yankees	Notes
Regular season games	Yankees	1,256‍–‍1,043‍–‍14	Yankees, 577‍–‍574‍–‍7	Yankees, 679‍–‍469‍–‍7	
Postseason games	Yankees	16‍–‍13	Tie, 6‍–‍6	Yankees, 10‍–‍7	
Postseason series	Yankees	4‍–‍3	N/A	N/A	ALWC: 2021, 2025, 2026; ALDS: 2018; ALCS: 1999, 2003, 2004
Regular and postseason	Yankees	1,272‍–‍1,056‍–‍14	Yankees, 583‍–‍580‍–‍7	Yankees, 689‍–‍476‍–‍7	

== Geography ==
Using Facebook Like button data, Ben Blatt of the Harvard College Sports Analysis Collective found in 2012 that Red Sox fans are east of the New York State–Vermont/Massachusetts border, and Yankees fans are west. Blatt wrote, "I had thought that it was possible that Red Sox Nation might extend into northern New York or Yankees territory might extend into Vermont. This turned out not to be the case." Connecticut divides support between the two teams; he found that 56.6% of Facebook users in Hartford, often cited as being on the border between the two teams' fans, supported the Yankees. While Blatt found that identifying an exact border within the state was impossible, Guilford and Middletown are almost exactly divided, with 50.7% in each city supporting the Yankees.

== Violence over rivalry ==
There have been occasions of arrests due to violence over the rivalry. In May 2008, a Yankees fan in Nashua, New Hampshire, was arrested and charged with reckless second-degree murder outside a bar, which resulted from an argument over the rivalry. Later in 2008, a man driving a car with New York license plates in Massachusetts was pulled from his car and savagely beaten because locals suspected the man of being a Yankees fan. During the final series of the 2010 season, Boston Police arrested a Yankees fan for stabbing a Red Sox fan over an argument about the rivalry.

== Rivalry outside baseball ==
Don Mattingly had appeared in public service announcements airing on the Spike TV network advocating fathers to spend time with their children as part of the "True Dads" campaign to encourage men to take an active role in their children's lives. Mattingly jokes at the end of the commercial about the impatience of one of the characters in the commercial by calling him a Red Sox fan.

On April 13, 2008, rumors of a construction worker burying a Red Sox jersey in the concrete of the new Yankee Stadium were verified. The worker, identified as Gino Castignoli, buried a David Ortiz jersey in what would become a service corridor in the hopes of cursing the new stadium. After extracting the jersey from underneath two feet of concrete, Yankees' President Randy Levine indicated that the shirt would be donated to the Jimmy Fund to be auctioned for the charity long associated with the Red Sox. Whatever curse was intended failed to bear fruit with the Yankees winning the World Series in their first year at the new stadium.

=== Politics ===
On October 23, 2007, former New York City mayor Rudolph Giuliani, who is a Yankees fan, said at a New Hampshire event for his presidential campaign that he would support the Red Sox over the Colorado Rockies in the 2007 World Series, which started the following day; the Red Sox went on to sweep the Rockies in four games. Giuliani justified his support of the Red Sox by proclaiming he was a fan of American League baseball. The following day, the New York Post and New York Daily News printed doctored photos of Giuliani as a Red Sox fan on their covers with the headlines "RED COAT" and "TRAITOR!" respectively. Topps parodied this in a 2008 baseball card altered to depict Giuliani on the field with the Red Sox as the team celebrated their 2007 World Series championship.

A month later, he was asked about his support for the Red Sox by one of the questioners in a Republican Presidential Debate. In response to the mayor's answer, former Massachusetts governor Mitt Romney, who was in office during the Red Sox 2004 win, claimed that all Americans are united in hatred of the Yankees.

Giuliani's successor, Michael Bloomberg, was born and raised in Massachusetts and grew up a Red Sox fan, but later switched his allegiance to the Yankees after assuming office. Bloomberg's successor, Bill de Blasio, who was born in New York City but primarily grew up in Cambridge, Massachusetts, openly supported the Red Sox World Series run during his 2013 campaign, winning the general election by a huge margin.

During the 2010 special Senate election in Massachusetts, Martha Coakley, the Democratic candidate and state Attorney General, faced a mild backlash for deriding Curt Schilling as "another Yankee fan" on a local radio show, after Schilling endorsed Coakley's Republican opponent, state senator Scott Brown. Many critics alleged that Coakley's apparent unfamiliarity with Schilling demonstrated a lack of awareness toward her Massachusetts constituents. Schilling responded, "I've been called a lot of things...but never, I mean never, could anyone make the mistake of calling me a Yankee fan. Well, check that; if you didn't know what the hell is going on in your own state maybe you could." Brown, who had polled as much as 30 points behind Coakley a month before the election, had seen a late surge in support prior to Coakley's comments and would eventually win a come from behind victory against her in the election.

=== Other sports ===
In 2002, when the NFL's New England Patriots held their victory celebration after winning their first Super Bowl; linebacker Larry Izzo fired up the crowd, chanting "Yankees suck!" The chant would become a fixture of Patriots Super Bowl victory rallies following their victories in Super Bowls XXXVIII in 2004 and XXXIX in 2005, which were sandwiched around the Red Sox 2004 World Series win. Dan Shaughnessy wrote about the chant: "Can you imagine a Giants or a Jets celebration in New York City in which a New York player would take the time to chant, 'Red Sox suck?'" Shaughnessy opined that should such a thing occur, it would be more likely at a Jets celebration, as a Giants celebration, like those of the Mets and the Rangers, would be more likely to feature such chants made in reference to the Philadelphia teams, as one of the Giants' primary rivalries is with the Philadelphia Eagles.

The rivalry was played out during Super Bowl XLII in February 2008, as it was a showdown between football teams from each metropolitan area, the New York Giants and the New England Patriots. The Giants defeated the Patriots in what was considered one of the greatest upsets in Super Bowl history. After the game Giants fans chanted "18 and 1! 18 and 1!", reminiscent of the infamous "1918" chant, towards Patriots fans as they left the stadium. (Had they won the game, the Patriots would have become the first NFL team to ever finish with a 19–0 record, and only the second NFL team since the 1972 Miami Dolphins to have a perfect season.) Giants fans called this revenge for the Red Sox comeback in 2004. The Giants and Patriots faced off again in Super Bowl XLVI; with the Giants once again defeating the Patriots. Dan Shaughnessy's piece in The Boston Globe on the Giants victory over the Patriots was headlined, "History Repeats."

During the 2008 NBA Finals between the Boston Celtics and the Los Angeles Lakers, movie director Spike Lee, a season ticket holder of the New York Knicks, wore a Yankees jersey and cap at Game 3 of the Finals in Los Angeles. Lee sat behind the Boston bench while loudly cheering for the Lakers, though he has a friendship with Ray Allen of the Celtics.

For the 2010 NHL Winter Classic outdoor ice hockey game held at Fenway Park, Boston Bruins then-backup goaltender Tuukka Rask had artwork on his "special event" goalie mask's upper front area depicting a roaring bear with a ripped New York Yankees home "pinstripe" jersey falling from its lower jaw.

In 2011, NBA star LeBron James worked a deal with Red Sox owner John Henry to take partial ownership of Henry's soccer subsidiary Liverpool Football Club of the Premier League. James was criticized in the New York media for spurning New York due to his being a purported Yankees fan.

On June 27, 2011, the Yankees/Red Sox feud spilled into the world of professional wrestling when CM Punk was cutting a promo against Boston native John Cena. CM Punk went on to call John Cena a hypocrite for reasons that were unfolding in their respective storyline and said that John Cena had become the very thing he had despised in the wrestling business. He concluded this promo by calling Cena the "New York Yankees". Cena then punched Punk for comparing him to his home team's famed rivals. [Punk:] "What you've lost sight of is what you are, and what you are is what you hate. You're the 10-time WWE Champion! You're the man! You, like the Red Sox, like Boston, are no longer the underdog! You're a dynasty. You are what you hate. You have become the New York Yankees!" [John Cena immediately punches Punk, who scoots out of the ring, grabs the contract, and goes up the ramp. Points respectively to Vince McMahon and John Cena] "You're Steinbrenner, and you might as well be Jeter! Mr. 3000, I'm the underdog!"

As the owners of the Yankees are partnered with Mansour bin Zayed Al Nahyan, owner of Manchester City F.C. through City Football Group, both groups have joint-ownership of Major League Soccer franchise New York City FC. With Red Sox being sisters of Liverpool F.C. through their Fenway Sports Group ownership, the 2014 International Champions Cup soccer game between English clubs Manchester City and Liverpool at Yankee Stadium carried a new angle of the Yankees and Red Sox rivalry. Liverpool defeated Manchester City on the day in a penalty shoot-out, after tying 0–0. Both teams have since developed their own rivalry in their home country, which also stems from the inter-city rivalry between Manchester and Liverpool that originated in the 19th century through the Industrial Revolution.

Rivalries between other New York sports teams and other Boston sports teams have been attributed to the Yankees–Red Sox rivalry. For example, some have pointed out the connections between this rivalry and those of the New York Jets and the New England Patriots in the NFL and the New York Knicks and the Boston Celtics in the NBA.

== MLB on Fox studio team ==
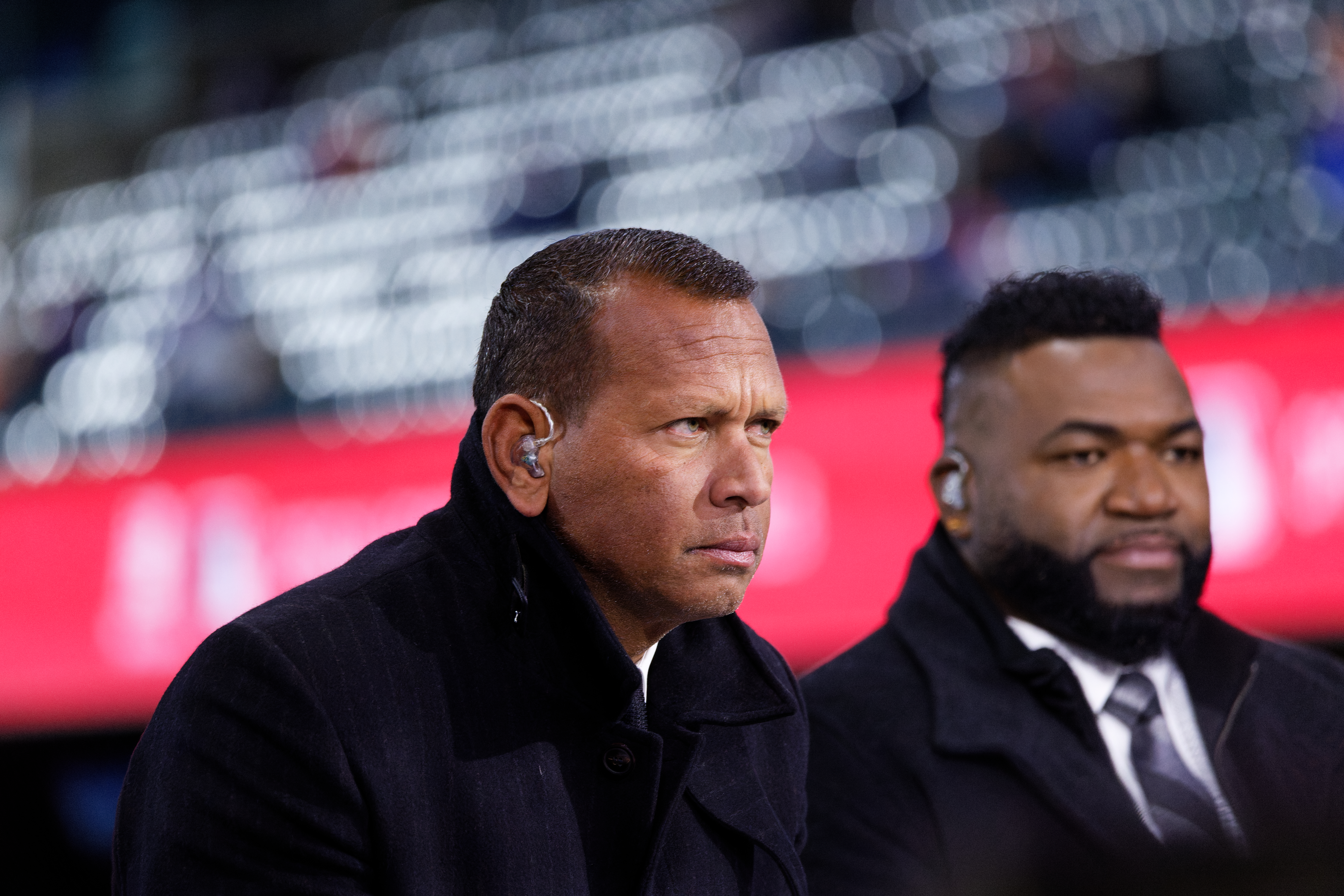
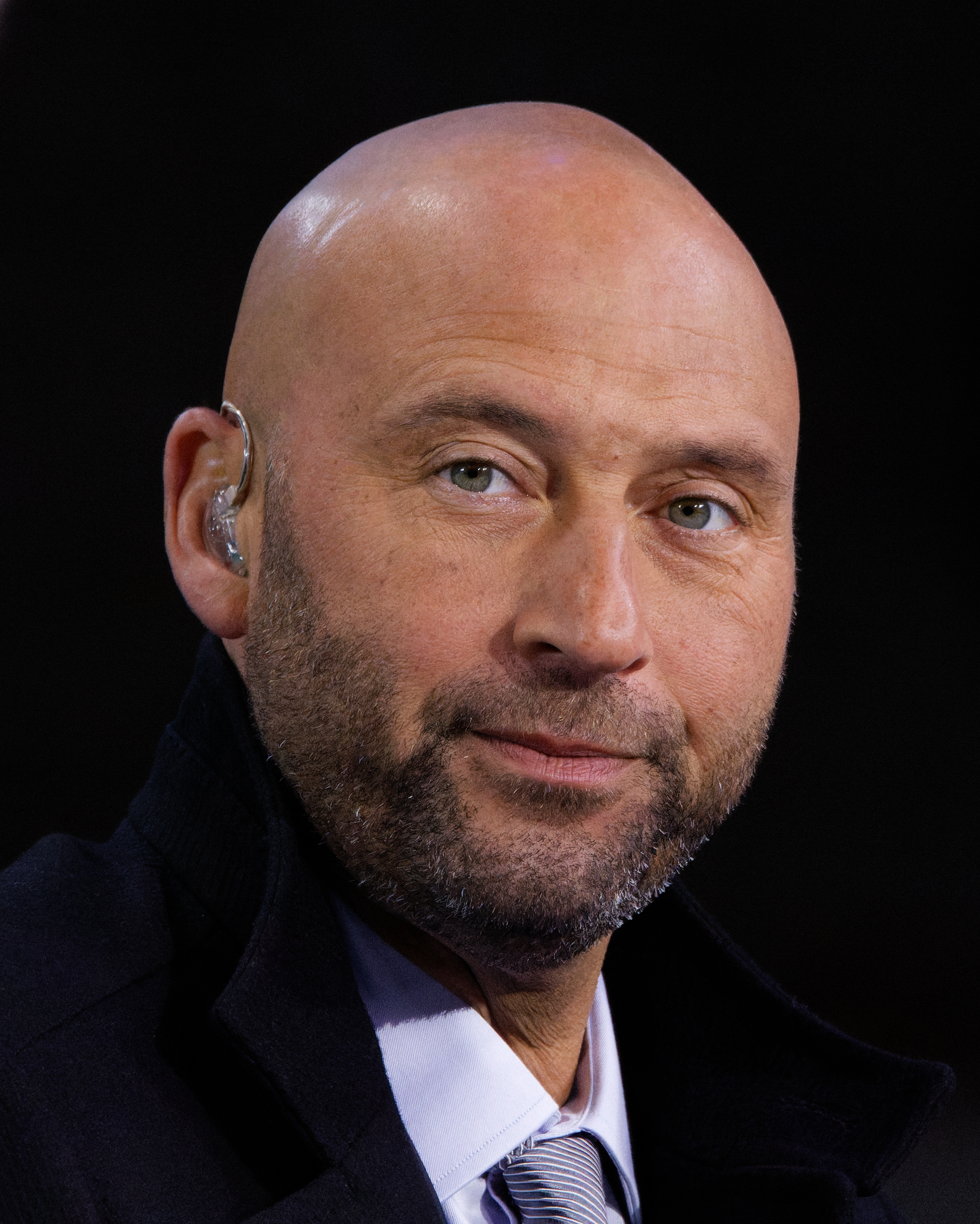
Alex Rodriguez and David Ortiz (left), along with Derek Jeter (right), comprise the current MLB on Fox studio team.

Currently, the MLB on Fox studio team includes Alex Rodriguez and Derek Jeter (former Yankees players), as well as David Ortiz (former Red Sox player), which has led to some playful disrespect and pranks involving the rivalry.

Prior to the 2021 MLB at Field of Dreams game, Rodriguez and Ortiz recreated the “have a catch” scene in which Ortiz refused to play catch with Rodriguez due to the rivalry.

Following Game 1 of the 2022 American League Division Series between the Yankees and Cleveland Guardians, Rodriguez pranked Ortiz during the post-game coverage by tricking him into wearing a Yankees helmet rather than a Red Sox helmet.

During Jeter’s debut as a member of the crew during the 2023 edition of the MLB London Series, Ortiz pranked him by gifting him a Red Sox jersey with his name and number on it, which Jeter promptly tossed upon realizing what it was.

Following coverage of Game 2 the 2023 American League Championship Series, the analysts discussed if the Houston Astros could rally from their 2–0 series deficit to the Texas Rangers, to which Jeter mentioned his team (which also included Rodriguez) blowing a 3–0 series lead against the Red Sox in the 2004 American League Championship Series, which Ortiz (a member of the Red Sox) responded with “YOU DID?!” (Ortiz notably had two clutch walk-off hits in Games 4 and 5 and was named MVP of the series, and Rodriguez and Jeter were notably involved in a play late in Game 6 where Jeter was on first, and Rodriguez was at bat and hit a ground ball, then slapped it out of the first baseman’s glove in an effort to frame it as a throwing error and allow Jeter to score from first base on the “error” before the umpires conferred with at least one having noticed the slap after the first base umpire did not see it, ruled Rodriguez out for interference, and sent Jeter back to first base, leading to fans throwing debris on the field).

== Broadcasts on television ==
The nature of the rivalry has led to games between the two teams being broadcast on national television. Whenever the two teams play a weekend series, the Friday game is sometimes broadcast on MLB Network (often as part of MLB Network Showcase) or livestreamed on Apple TV+ (Friday Night Baseball), the Saturday game is broadcast on either Fox or Fox Sports 1 (Fox Saturday Baseball in the afternoon, Baseball Night in America in the evening), and the Sunday game is broadcast on MLB Network in the afternoon or Sunday Night Baseball on either ESPN (1990–2025) or NBC (since 2026); NESN in the Boston market and the YES Network (or Amazon Prime Video in case of conflicts with the Brooklyn Nets and the New York Liberty) in the New York City market always carry games not assigned on either Fox, FS1 (unless specified), ESPN, ABC or NBC. Weekday games are generally broadcast on MLB Network, FS1 (occasional Monday or Thursday nights), Fox (Thursday nights during September), ESPN or ABC (mainly special weekday broadcasts), or TBS (MLB Tuesday as of 2022). On September 22, 2022, a Yankees–Red Sox game was shown exclusively on a livestreaming platform for the first time, with Apple TV+ handling the online-exclusive broadcast as part of Friday Night Baseball.

In 2004, the first game of the season between the two teams, on Friday, April 16, was nationally broadcast on Fox, because it marked the first time the two teams were facing each other since the memorable 2003 American League Championship Series. This was the first over-the-air broadcast of a regular-season game in prime-time since Mark McGwire hit his 62nd home run to break Roger Maris' record in 1998. In October, when the two teams met in the ALCS, Selig moved Game 5 of the series to primetime due to the rematch.

The broadcasts of the games between the rivals have led to an increase in television ratings. These games have had at least 50% higher ratings than all of the other games broadcast, sometimes almost twice as high than locally broadcast games. In most cases, the most-watched MLB game on any network during a season is a game between the Yankees and the Red Sox.

== See also ==
- Major League Baseball rivalries
- Jets–Patriots rivalry
- Giants–Patriots rivalry
- Celtics–Knicks rivalry
- Bruins–Rangers rivalry
