= Battle of Quebec (ice hockey) =

National Hockey League rivalry

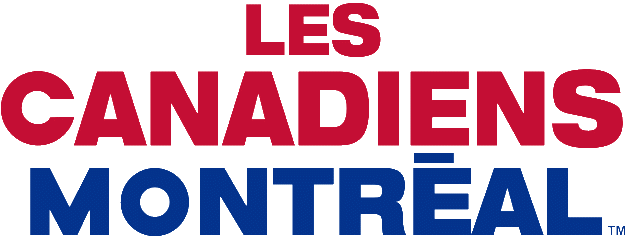
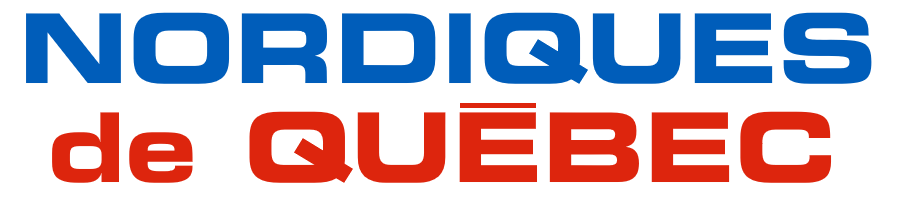
- Montreal Canadiens Quebec Nordiques
- First meeting: October 13, 1979
- Latest meeting: April 26, 1995

Statistics
- Total meetings: 144
- All-time series: 79–53–12 (MTL)
- Regular season series: 62–39–12 (MTL)
- Postseason results: 17–14 (MTL)
- Largest victory: MTL 8–0 QUE; March 22, 1989
- Longest win streak: MTL W7

Postseason history
- 1982 division semifinals: Nordiques won, 3–2; 1984 division finals: Canadiens won, 4–2; 1985 division finals: Nordiques won, 4–3; 1987 division finals: Canadiens won, 4–3; 1993 division semifinals: Canadiens won, 4–2

The Battle of Quebec (French: Bataille du Québec) was a National Hockey League (NHL) rivalry between the Montreal Canadiens and Quebec Nordiques. The rivalry lasted from 1979–80 to 1994–95. The teams played against each other five times in the NHL playoffs with the Canadiens winning three of the series. One meeting in 1984 resulted in the Good Friday Massacre, a game in which multiple brawls happened. The Battle of Quebec extended to politics, in which the Canadiens and Nordiques became symbols for rival parties, and beer distribution, as the teams were both owned by competing breweries.

== Background ==
The Nordiques began play in 1972, in the World Hockey Association (WHA). As part of the new league's raid on NHL talent, the team signed J. C. Tremblay, a Canadiens defenceman, to a five-year contract. Quebec also hired former Montreal players Maurice Richard and Jacques Plante as head coaches. The Canadiens–Nordiques rivalry began in the 1979–80 season, when the Nordiques became one of four former WHA teams to join the NHL as part of the NHL–WHA merger. The Canadiens originally were one of five teams to vote down the merger. However, the Canadiens' owner, Molson Brewery, eventually capitulated after Canadian cities with WHA teams in the deal boycotted the brand. The team supported the merger in a subsequent vote. At first the teams were placed in different divisions; Montreal was in the Norris Division, while Quebec was given a spot in the Adams Division.

== History ==
=== 1979–1982 ===
The teams played their first game against each other in Montreal on October 13, 1979, and the Canadiens won 3–1. The Nordiques hosted the rivalry for the first time on October 29, and upset the Canadiens 5–4; the Ottawa Citizen wrote that "The victory marked the end of a decades-old Quebec belief that Montreal was unbeatable." The rivalry was fairly even in its first few years; from the 1979–80 to 1981–82 regular seasons, the Canadiens were 6–5–5 in the series, and had just one win away from the Montreal Forum.

The NHL realigned before the 1981–82 season, and the Canadiens were placed in the Adams Division with the Nordiques. In the 1982 playoffs, the teams met in the postseason for the first time. After a Game 1 loss, the Nordiques won the next two games, putting them in position to win the best-of-five series. Montreal won the fourth game 6–2; the contest featured a combined 251 penalty minutes, including 159 from one first-period altercation. The Montreal Forum was the site of Game 5, where the Canadiens scored twice in the third period to force a 2–2 tie and a series-deciding overtime period. The game, and series, came to a quick end 22 seconds into the extra period when Quebec's Dale Hunter scored after a 2-on-1 odd-man rush to give the Nordiques the victory.

=== 1984 playoffs: Good Friday Massacre ===
In 1984, the teams met again in the playoffs; by this time the rivalry had been given the Battle of Quebec nickname. The teams split the first four games of the best-of-seven series before Montreal won game five in Quebec City, 4–0. Game six, which became known as the Good Friday Massacre, took place in Montreal on April 20, 1984. The Canadiens rallied from a two-goal deficit in the third period to win 5–3 and clinch the series, but the game is best known for having multiple brawls in the last two periods. The fighting started as the second period was ending, after an incident between the Nordiques' Hunter and the Canadiens' Guy Carbonneau, who was "pinned to the ice" by Hunter. More than 10 minutes of brawling followed, and the teams were given 222 penalty minutes for the second period. Ten players were thrown out of the game between both brawls, but several were not immediately told of their ejections after the first one, as the officials had not finished recording all of the penalties during the intermission. A 10-minute-long bench-clearing brawl occurred after the announcement of the ejections, and the total number of penalty minutes in the game exceeded 250.

=== 1984–1987 ===
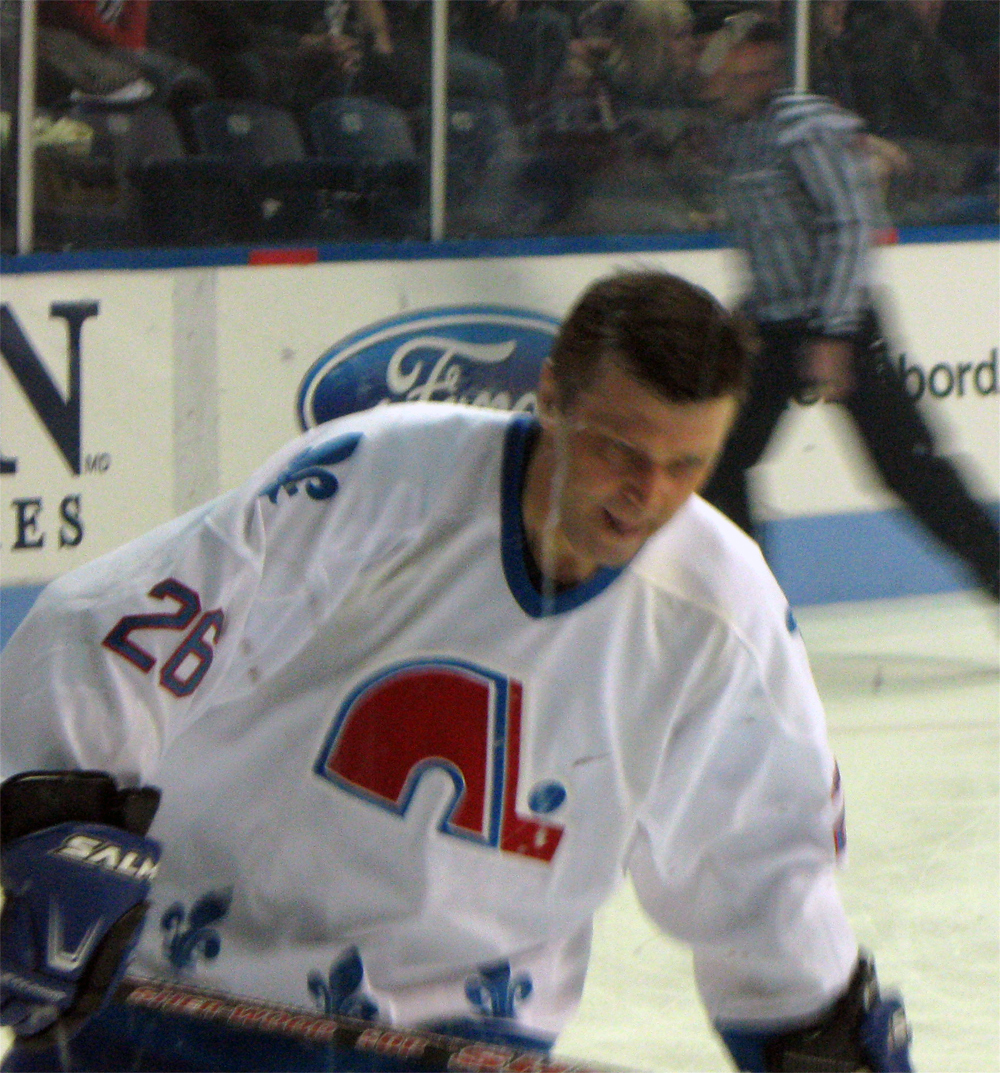
Peter Stastny scored in overtime of game seven of the 1985 Canadiens–Nordiques playoff series for Quebec.

In eight games between the teams during the 1984–85 season, the Canadiens lost only once, posting six victories. The 1985 playoffs saw the Canadiens and Nordiques face each other in the postseason for the third time in four years. The Nordiques won the first and third games in overtime and jumped out to a 3–2 lead after winning Game 5 in Montreal, 5–1. The Canadiens responded with a 5–2 win in Quebec City in the sixth game, sending the series to a decisive game seven back in Montreal. After regulation play ended with the score tied 2–2, the game entered overtime. Peter Stastny scored for the Nordiques at 2:22 of the extra period, giving the Nordiques the game and the series.

The teams did not meet in the 1986 playoffs, as the Nordiques lost to the Hartford Whalers in the first round, while the Canadiens won the Stanley Cup. In 1987, however, Montreal and Quebec had their fourth playoff matchup. The Nordiques won the first two games in the Montreal Forum, before the Canadiens evened the series with a pair of wins in Quebec City. Game four was decided in overtime, and featured a pregame fight. Montreal won game five at home, though not without controversy. With the score tied 2–2 late in the third period, Alain Cote scored what appeared to be the go-ahead goal for the Nordiques, only to see it waved off due to offsetting penalties on both teams. Ryan Walter netted the game-winner for the Canadiens 14 seconds later. Quebec coach Michel Bergeron called his team's loss "a crime", saying "No one wants to let us win." One attorney in Quebec City offered to help the Nordiques challenge the final result of the game, which the team decided against. The Nordiques won game six at home, but the Canadiens won the deciding game seven 5–3, scoring all of their goals in the second period.

=== 1993 playoffs and Nordiques' relocation ===
In the 1993 playoffs, the Canadiens and Nordiques met in the opening round. The Nordiques took a 2–0 lead in the series, but Montreal won four straight games after that to capture the series. Three of the six games went to overtime; the Canadiens won two of those, including game five in Quebec City, which gave them the lead in the series. A 6–2 victory in Game 6 clinched the series for the Canadiens, who later won the Stanley Cup. The rivalry came to an end following the 1994–95 season, when the Nordiques relocated to Denver, Colorado, and became the Colorado Avalanche.

However, the rivalry never completely died out. In 2002, the Avalanche held an exhibition game against the Canadiens in Quebec City. When Joe Sakic, a former Nordique, entered the arena with the Nordique blue, the fans gave him a thundering ovation. He said that "you're not going to find a better hockey city. It was really moving. There are no words." In 2010, La série Montréal-Québec, a TVA television series featuring games between amateur teams from the two cities, premiered.

== Causes ==
Both of the teams in the rivalry were based in the province of Quebec. Montreal is the province's largest city, while Quebec City is its capital. One Nordiques employee said of the disparity between the size of the two cities, "Quebec City has always had a relationship of frustration with Montreal. This rivalry is the first time that Montreal and Quebec City can compete head to head in one event." Michael Farber wrote that hostility towards the Canadiens in Quebec City dated back to the team's signing of Jean Beliveau, who previously played with the Quebec Aces. According to the Canadian Press, the Battle of Quebec also matched teams with opposite backgrounds. The Canadiens were a traditionally strong team, while the Nordiques were relatively new to the NHL during their playoff series in the mid-1980s. Stastny said of the rivalry, "It's like two camps, each representing something, you're not just playing for your team, you're playing for your half-a-million supporters and they're playing for their one or two million supporters."

The teams took on political symbolism during the rivalry. The Canadiens were seen by some as reflective of those in favour of keeping the province as part of Canada, while the Nordiques were seen as a symbol of Quebec independence. The Nordiques gained a large francophone fan base in Quebec, and their uniforms contained the colours and crest from the province's flag. One early-1980s survey by the La Presse newspaper found that, outside of east Montreal, support for the Canadiens and Nordiques tended to mirror where support existed for the Quebec Liberal Party and Parti Québécois, respectively.

A concurrent rivalry took place between the teams' owners, which were both breweries. Molson had purchased ownership of the Canadiens before the NHL–WHA merger, and the Nordiques were controlled by Carling O'Keefe. In May 1982, following the Canadiens' elimination from the NHL playoffs at the hands of the Nordiques the previous month, a 9.5 per cent decline in Quebec's beer consumption was recorded. Montreal reporter Red Fisher credited Molson and Carling O'Keefe for expanding the rivalry, saying, "The breweries have carried the red flags in this."

The Canadiens and Nordiques fought multiple battles over league television rights. When the Nordiques joined the NHL in the merger with the WHA, a clause in the contract forced the Nordiques to forfeit revenue from Hockey Night in Canada telecasts for a five-year period. Molson was a leading sponsor of the broadcasts, and Nordiques president Marcel Aubut cited the agreement as an extension of the Molson–Carling O'Keefe rivalry. The teams also wound up on opposite sides of a dispute over the Trans-Border Agreement, which allowed the Canadiens and Toronto Maple Leafs to receive most of the proceeds from television rights in Canada. The Nordiques joined U.S.-based franchises in 1984 in trying to have games played in the U.S. televised; this led to a $22 million lawsuit by the other Canada-based teams, which was settled out of court.
