= Louis Sleigher =

Canadian ice hockey player

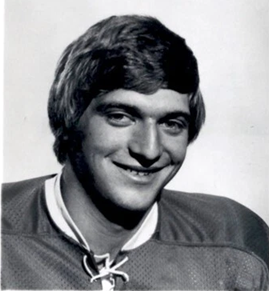
- Sleigher in 1978 photo
- Born: October 23, 1958 (age 67) Nouvelle, Quebec, Canada
- Height: 5 ft 11 in (180 cm)
- Weight: 200 lb (91 kg; 14 st 4 lb)
- Position: Right wing
- Shot: Right
- Played for: Birmingham Bulls; Quebec Nordiques; Boston Bruins
- NHL draft: 233rd overall, 1978; Montreal Canadiens
- Playing career: 1978–1986

Louis Sleigher (born October 23, 1958) is a Canadian former professional ice hockey player who played 62 games in one season with the Birmingham Bulls in the World Hockey Association and 194 games over seven seasons in the National Hockey League with the Quebec Nordiques and the Boston Bruins between 1978 and 1986.

In the 1984 NHL Playoffs, Sleigher was a major part of the Good Friday Massacre (French: la bataille du Vendredi saint), in which he knocked Montreal Canadiens player Jean Hamel unconscious with a sucker-punch during a bench-clearing brawl. The blow eventually contributed to the end of Hamel's playing career. After playing six games for Quebec the following season, Sleigher was dealt to the Boston Bruins where he played two more seasons before retiring.

== Career statistics ==
=== Regular season and playoffs ===
			Regular season					Playoffs
Season	Team	League	GP	G	A	Pts	PIM	GP	G	A	Pts	PIM
1976–77	Chicoutimi Sagueneens	QMJHL	70	53	48	101	49	8	5	3	8	9
1977–78	Chicoutimi Sagueneens	QMJHL	71	65	54	119	113	—	—	—	—	—
1978–79	Birmingham Bulls	WHA	62	26	12	38	46	—	—	—	—	—
1979–80	Quebec Nordiques	NHL	2	0	1	1	0	—	—	—	—	—
1979–80	Syracuse Firebirds	AHL	58	28	15	43	37	1	0	1	1	15
1980–81	Erie Blades	EHL	50	39	29	68	129	8	6	4	10	12
1981–82	Quebec Nordiques	NHL	8	0	0	0	0	—	—	—	—	—
1981–82	Fredericton Express	AHL	59	32	34	66	37	—	—	—	—	—
1982–83	Quebec Nordiques	NHL	51	14	10	24	49	4	0	0	0	4
1982–83	Fredericton Express	AHL	12	8	2	10	9	—	—	—	—	—
1983–84	Quebec Nordiques	NHL	44	15	19	34	32	7	1	1	2	42
1984–85	Quebec Nordiques	NHL	6	1	2	3	0	—	—	—	—	—
1984–85	Boston Bruins	NHL	70	12	19	31	45	5	0	0	0	4
1985–86	Boston Bruins	NHL	13	4	2	6	20	1	0	0	0	14
WHA totals			62	26	12	38	46	—	—	—	—	—
NHL totals			194	46	53	99	146	17	1	1	2	64
