= Jean Hamel =

Canadian ice hockey player

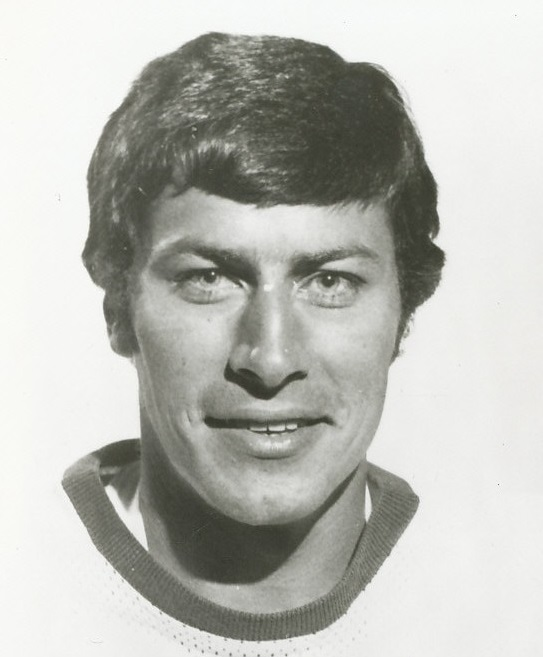
- Hamel in the 1979–80 hockey season
- Born: June 6, 1952 (age 72); Asbestos, Quebec, Canada
- Height: 5 ft 11 in (180 cm)
- Weight: 195 lb (88 kg; 13 st 13 lb)
- Position: Defence
- Shot: Left
- Played for: St. Louis Blues; Detroit Red Wings; Quebec Nordiques; Montreal Canadiens
- NHL draft: 41st overall, 1972; St. Louis Blues
- Playing career: 1972–1984

Joseph Jean Pierre Hamel (born June 6, 1952) is a Canadian former professional ice hockey player who played 699 games over 12 seasons in the National Hockey League. He played for the St. Louis Blues, Detroit Red Wings, Quebec Nordiques, and Montreal Canadiens. Jean is the brother of Gilles Hamel.

Hamel was born in Asbestos, Quebec. As a youth, he played in the 1965 Quebec International Pee-Wee Hockey Tournament with a minor ice hockey team from Asbestos.

Hamel retired from professional hockey in 1984, as a direct result of having sustained two serious eye injuries while playing for the Montreal Canadiens that year — the first, caused by Louis Sleigher's sucker punch during the April 20 "Good Friday Massacre", and the second, during an October 4 pre-season match.

When Hamel retired, the Canadiens organization hired him as an assistant coach with their new Sherbrooke Canadiens farm team in the American Hockey League (AHL). Hamel served as an assistant coach, later head coach, during the entire six seasons that the Sherbrooke Canadiens existed as a franchise. During his final two years as head coach, the Sherbrooke Canadiens finished first overall in the AHL for the 1988–89 and 1989–90 AHL regular seasons. Starting the next season, Hamel served as head coach of the Drummondville Voltigeurs, in the Quebec Major Junior Hockey League, for four seasons. After a four-year break, Hamel returned to his birthplace as head coach with the Asbestos Aztecs, of the Quebec Semi-Pro Hockey League, for one season (1999–2000).

== Career statistics ==
			Regular season					Playoffs
Season	Team	League	GP	G	A	Pts	PIM	GP	G	A	Pts	PIM
1969–70	Drummondville Rangers	QMJHL	56	4	11	15	75	6	1	1	2	20
1970–71	Drummondville Rangers	QMJHL	61	7	23	30	109	6	1	1	2	8
1971–72	Drummondville Rangers	QMJHL	59	6	29	35	132	9	1	0	1	48
1972–73	Denver Spurs	WHL	13	0	6	6	22	—	—	—	—	—
1972–73	St. Louis Blues	NHL	55	2	7	9	24	2	0	0	0	0
1973–74	Denver Spurs	WHL	10	0	2	2	12	—	—	—	—	—
1973–74	St. Louis Blues	NHL	23	1	1	2	6	—	—	—	—	—
1973–74	Detroit Red Wings	NHL	22	0	3	3	40	—	—	—	—	—
1974–75	Detroit Red Wings	NHL	80	5	19	24	136	—	—	—	—	—
1975–76	Detroit Red Wings	NHL	77	3	9	12	129	—	—	—	—	—
1976–77	Detroit Red Wings	NHL	71	1	10	11	63	—	—	—	—	—
1977–78	Detroit Red Wings	NHL	32	2	6	8	34	7	0	0	0	10
1977–78	Kansas City Red Wings	CHL	28	2	10	12	29	—	—	—	—	—
1978–79	Detroit Red Wings	NHL	52	2	4	6	72	—	—	—	—	—
1979–80	Detroit Red Wings	NHL	49	1	4	5	43	—	—	—	—	—
1980–81	Detroit Red Wings	NHL	68	5	7	12	57	—	—	—	—	—
1980–81	Adirondack Red Wings	AHL	7	1	3	4	36	—	—	—	—	—
1981–82	Quebec Nordiques	NHL	40	1	6	7	32	5	0	0	0	16
1981–82	Fredericton Express	AHL	16	2	4	6	19	—	—	—	—	—
1982–83	Quebec Nordiques	NHL	51	2	7	9	38	4	0	0	0	2
1983–84	Montreal Canadiens	NHL	79	1	12	13	92	15	0	2	2	16
NHL totals			699	26	95	121	766	33	0	2	2	44
