= List of NHL rivalries =

Rivalries among NHL teams

Rivalries in the National Hockey League have occurred between many teams and cities. Rivalries have arisen among NHL teams for many different reasons, the primary ones including geographic proximity, familiarity with opponents, on-ice incidents, and cultural, linguistic, or national pride.

The importance of these various factors has varied widely throughout the history of the league.

== Early history ==
During the earliest days of the NHL, the league was limited strictly to Central Canada, and all cities in the league were in close proximity, making for bitter rivalries all around. In addition, Montreal had two teams representing its English-French divide. The "French" Canadiens battled the "English" Wanderers (and later the Maroons). Rivalries also existed with other leagues, such as the Pacific Coast Hockey Association. It was not until 1926 that the NHL took sole ownership of the Stanley Cup. By that time, the league began expanding into the United States, and new rivalries were created. Rapid expansion into the U.S. for a short time created a cross-town rivalry in New York City between the New York Rangers and New York Americans. The economic turmoil of the Great Depression and World War II, however, forced several teams to fold, with the result that by 1942 the NHL consisted of only six teams.

=== Original Six rivalries ===
From 1942 to 1967, only six teams (the Boston Bruins, Chicago Blackhawks, Montreal Canadiens, Detroit Red Wings, New York Rangers, and Toronto Maple Leafs) played in the NHL. With only five other opponents, teams played more frequently and games were often underscored by personal rivalries between players. These personal and team rivalries lasted for many years, as the turnover rate on NHL rosters was very low. At one point or another, during this era, all the teams had animosity towards one another.

== Eastern Conference ==
=== Atlantic Division ===
The Atlantic Division was formed in 1974 as the Adams Division, which beginning in 1981 had all its teams in Eastern Canada and New England with the exception of the Buffalo Sabres, which are located in Western New York. The division became the Northeast Division in 1993, and then the Atlantic Division in 2013.

==== Battle of Florida: Florida Panthers vs. Tampa Bay Lightning ====
The Florida Panthers and Tampa Bay Lightning are both teams located within the state of Florida along Interstate 75, representing different geographical areas within the state. The two teams have played in the same division since 1993 (Atlantic Division from 1993 to 1998, Southeast Division from 1998 to 2013, Central Division in the pandemic-shortened 2020–21 season, and the new Atlantic Division since 2013, except the 2020–21 season). The rivalry has at times been recognized by an actual trophy, known variously as the "Sunshine Cup", "Nextel Cup", and most recently, the "Governor's Cup." The physical trophy has not been awarded since the 2013–14 season.

Despite joining the league within a year of each other, Florida found success first, with a trip to the Stanley Cup Final in just its third season. The Lightning eventually gained the upper hand, making it to five Eastern Conference finals in the 2010s, while the Panthers fell to the bottom of the Atlantic; for much of this decade, the rivalry was considered dormant by sportswriters. The improvement of the Panthers in the early 2020s under GM Bill Zito, however, made regular season meetings far more competitive.

The teams met in the postseason for the first time in the first round of the 2021 Stanley Cup playoffs, with Tampa Bay winning the series in six games; they would go on to win their second consecutive Stanley Cup. They met again in the second round of the 2022 Stanley Cup playoffs. This time, the Lightning swept the Panthers, sending them to the conference finals en route to the Stanley Cup Final. In their third confrontation in the 2024 Stanley Cup playoffs, the Panthers won the series in five games; they would go and win their first ever Stanley Cup. The teams met again in the postseason for the second straight time in the first round of the 2025 Stanley Cup playoffs with Florida again winning the series in five games en route to their second straight Stanley Cup.

As of the end of the 2025–26 season, Florida leads the regular season record, 82–54–10–19, while both teams are tied in the playoff record, 10–10.

==== Battle of Ontario: Ottawa Senators vs. Toronto Maple Leafs ====
The Battle of Ontario is a rivalry between the Ottawa Senators and Toronto Maple Leafs. It is the current version of an old rivalry between Ottawa, Canada's capital, and Toronto, Canada's largest city and business capital. The teams compete in the same division and meet frequently during regular season games. In the early 2000s, the teams met four consecutive times in the playoffs with Toronto winning all four series. The rivalry began before the NHL existed, as the Senators and Toronto Blueshirts competed in the National Hockey Association. Ottawa and Toronto ice hockey teams first competed against each other in 1890 in the amateur Ontario Hockey Association.

As of the end of the 2025–26 season, Ottawa leads the regular season record, 79–56–3–13, while Toronto leads the playoff record, 20–10.

==== Boston Bruins vs. Montreal Canadiens ====
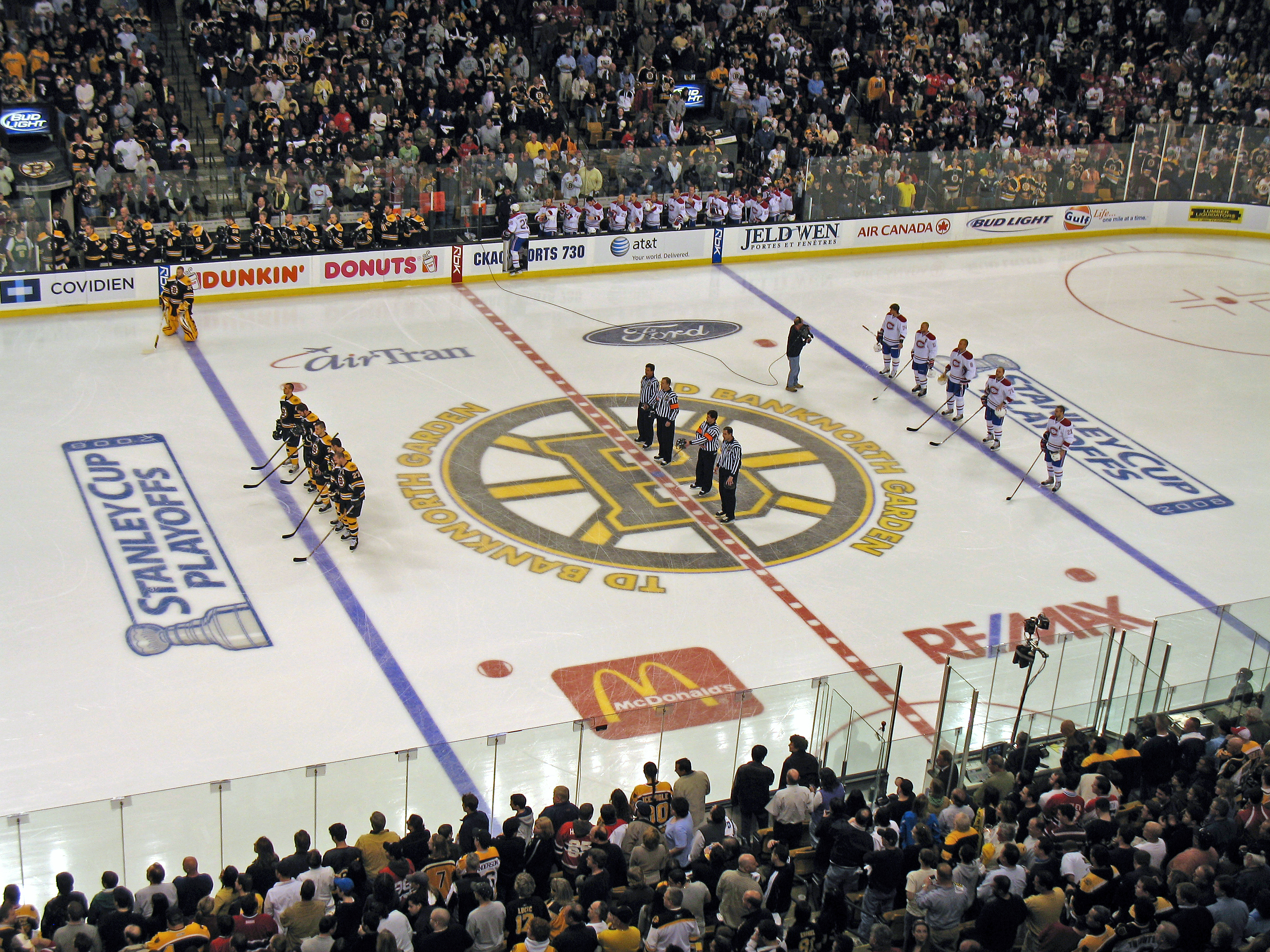
Players line up prior to game six of the 2008 playoffs between the Bruins and Canadiens in Boston

The Bruins–Canadiens rivalry is considered by former Canadiens head coach Jacques Martin to be "one of the greatest rivalries in sports," along with the Red Sox–Yankees rivalry, Dodgers–Giants rivalry, Bears–Packers rivalry, and Celtics–Lakers rivalry. The two teams have played each other more times, in both regular season play and the playoffs, than any other two teams in NHL history.

In the playoffs, the two teams have met in 34 series for a total of 171 games, which is 11 series and 60 more games than two other Original Six teams, the Red Wings and Maple Leafs. The two teams have faced each other nine times in game sevens, more times than any other opponents in NHL history.

As of the end of the 2025–26 season, Montreal leads the regular season record, 367–286–103–12, and the playoff record, 106–71 against Boston.

==== Boston Bruins vs. Toronto Maple Leafs ====
Both teams are Original Six teams, with their first game played in Boston's inaugural season in 1924–25. From 1924 to 2024, the two teams met each other in the 17 playoff series, and faced each other in the 1939 Stanley Cup Final.

Since the start of millennium, the teams have met four times within the span of eleven years. Their 2013 conference quarterfinals series saw the Bruins rally from a 4–1 third period deficit in game seven to defeat the Maple Leafs in overtime, 5–4, and advance to the second round. The Bruins and Maple Leafs faced each other in the 2018, 2019, and 2024 Stanley Cup playoffs with the Bruins winning all four series in seven games.

As of the end of the 2025–26 season, Boston leads the regular season record, 311–272–98–14, and the playoff record, 46–43–1 against Toronto.

==== Buffalo Sabres vs. Toronto Maple Leafs ====
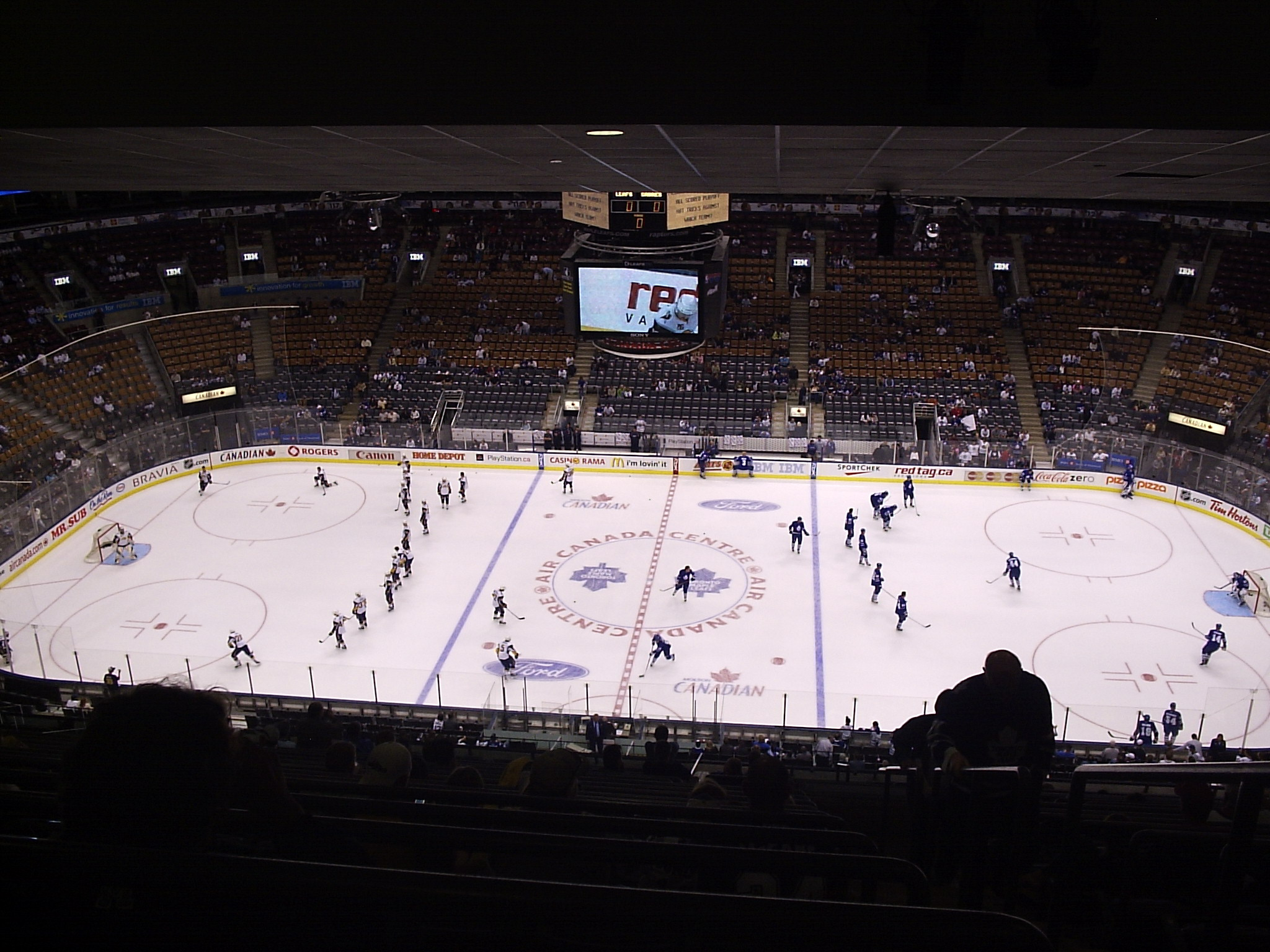
The Sabres and Maple Leafs warming up prior to a pre-season exhibition game in September 2007

The rivalry between the Buffalo Sabres and Toronto Maple Leafs is due to proximity – only 100 miles separate the Sabres' home arena, KeyBank Center, from the Maple Leafs' home arena, Scotiabank Arena. The Sabres won 70 of 103 all-time home games against the Maple Leafs from their inception in 1970–71 until 2015–16 (the last season before Toronto drafted Auston Matthews), despite the always large contingency of Toronto fans at those games. Since the 1998–99 season, both teams have played in the Northeast Division, now the Atlantic Division. Buffalo won the 1999 Eastern Conference finals against Toronto in five games, the only playoff series between the two teams. During the 2018–19 season, Toronto swept Buffalo in the season series for the first time. Buffalo previously swept a season series with Toronto in 1979–80, 1987–88, and 1991–92.

As of the end of the 2025–26 season, Buffalo leads the regular season record, 126–80–18–12, and the playoff record, 4–1 against Toronto.

==== Detroit Red Wings vs. Toronto Maple Leafs ====
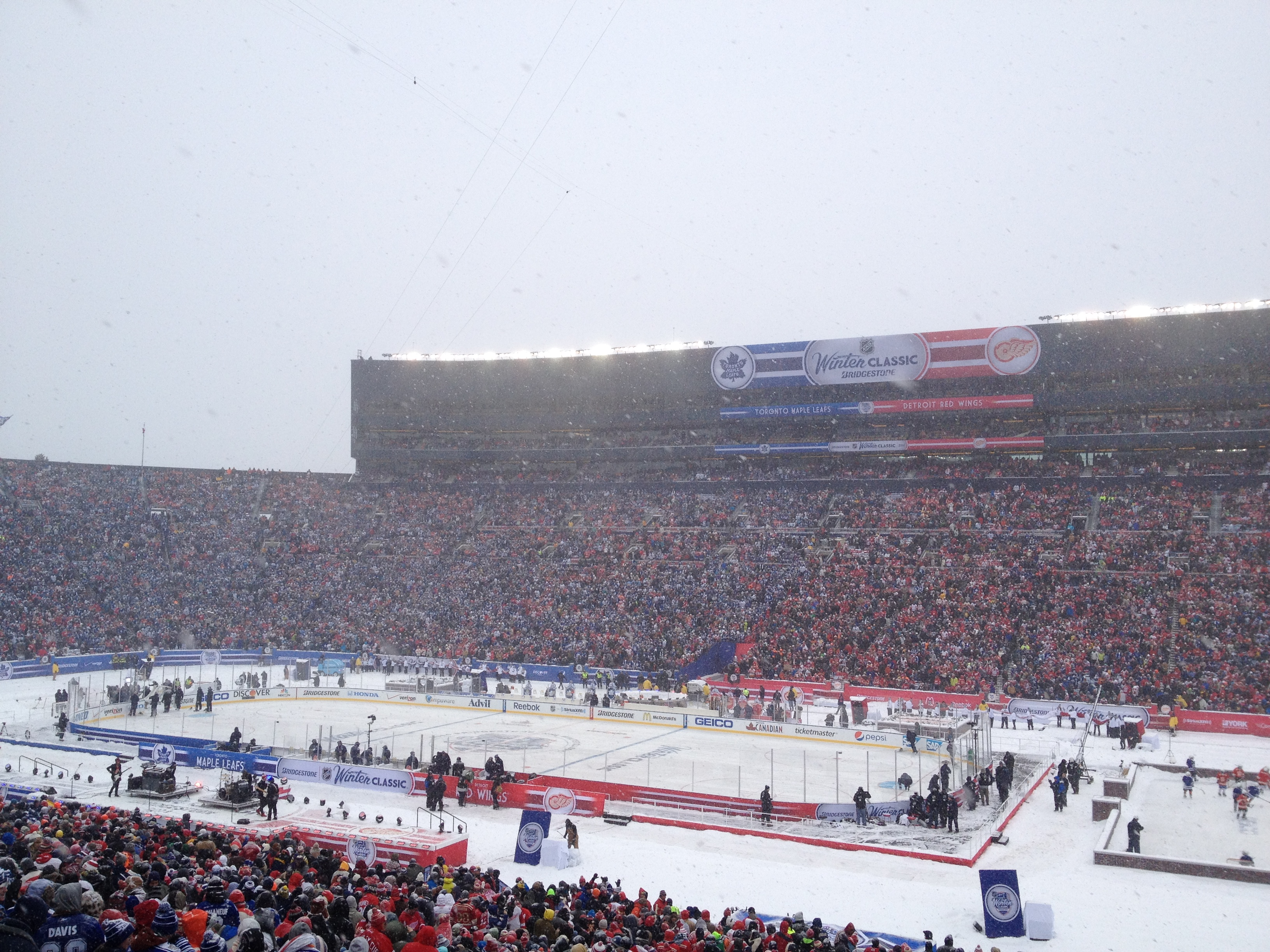
The 2014 Winter Classic prior to puck drop. The outdoor game featured the Red Wings and Maple Leafs.

This rivalry dates to the 1920s. As of 2017, they have had twenty-three playoff meetings, five in the Final. In the 1950 playoffs, when Gordie Howe mistimed a check on Toronto's Ted Kennedy and fell head-first into the boards, suffering severe injuries and needing emergency surgery to save his life, Kennedy was exonerated by the NHL. Detroit management and fans accused him of deliberately injuring Howe. Both teams share a close proximity to each other – Toronto and Detroit are approximately 240 miles (380 km) apart, mainly using Ontario Highway 401 — and both areas have shared fans. After the Leafs moved to the Eastern Conference in 1998, they faced each other less often.

The matchup became a divisional one for the first time in fifteen seasons, in the 2013–14 season when the Red Wings moved into the Eastern Conference, sharing their division with the Maple Leafs. The 2014 Winter Classic was played between the Red Wings and the Maple Leafs at Michigan Stadium in Ann Arbor on January 1, 2014. They also played each other in the NHL Centennial Classic on January 1, 2017.

As of the end of the 2025–26 season, Toronto leads the regular season record, 303–287–93–8, while Detroit leads the playoff record, 59–58.

==== Montreal Canadiens vs. Ottawa Senators ====
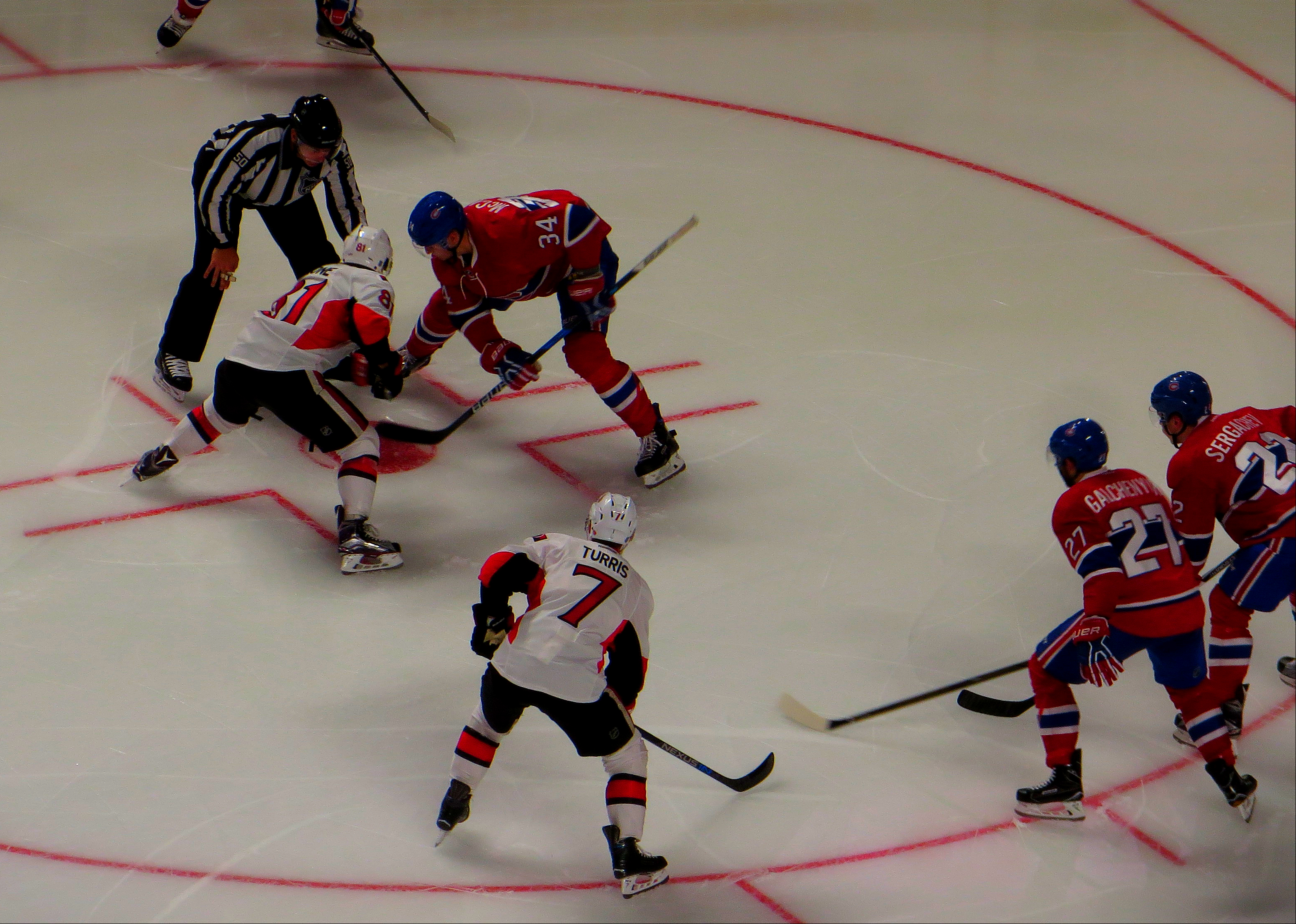
Skaters from the Canadiens and Senators prepare to face off during a pre-season exhibition game in September 2016

The rivalry between the Montreal Canadiens and the original Ottawa Senators and later, the contemporary Ottawa Senators began before the NHL was born as both teams played in the National Hockey Association beginning in 1910. Prior to that, Montreal and Ottawa teams played in various amateur leagues from 1884 and competed for the Stanley Cup from the first season it was awarded in 1894. The teams first played each other on January 22, 1910, when the Canadiens were still known as "Les Canadiens", and Ottawa had not adopted the Senators nickname. Ottawa and the Canadiens first met in the playoffs in March 1917, won by Montreal, which then faced Seattle in the Stanley Cup Final. This rivalry was transferred to the NHL as both teams were original members of the NHL. The first National Hockey League game was between the original Ottawa Senators and Montreal Canadiens on December 19, 1917. Also, in 1927, the two teams faced each other in the second round, Ottawa won that series and they went on to win the Stanley Cup. After the Senators NHL franchise was disbanded, an amateur Ottawa Senators team continued the rivalry by playing Montreal teams in the Quebec Senior League until 1954.

The Canadiens and the contemporary Senators face each other often as they are both in the Atlantic Division. Fueling the rivalry is the cities' proximity to each other. There is only a two-hour drive from Montreal to Ottawa via Quebec Autoroute 40 and Ontario Highway 417, plus railway and air connections. The current Ottawa Senators' first NHL game was held in Ottawa on October 8, 1992, where the expansion Senators beat the Canadiens 5–3. That victory was one of the only Senators' highlights of their inaugural season; they won only nine more games the rest of the season to finish with ten wins and 24 points, while the Canadiens won their 24th Stanley Cup that season. Another regular season highlight of the Canadiens–Ottawa rivalry was the NHL 100 Classic played at TD Place Stadium outdoors in Ottawa on December 16, 2017, celebrating the centennial of the first NHL games.

The current Senators and the Canadiens faced each other in the playoffs for the first time in 2013. In that series, there were some controversial events. In game one, Ottawa's Eric Gryba laid out Montreal's Lars Eller in an open ice hit. After the game, the Senators' head coach Paul MacLean blamed Raphael Diaz for a suicide pass. Later, Canadiens' coach Michel Therrien responded and said that what MacLean said was a "lack of respect." Ottawa won that game 4–2. Brandon Prust later insulted MacLean after the game, saying that he did not care what that "bug-eyed, fat walrus has to say." In game three, there was a full line brawl between Ottawa and Montreal. And later in that game, Paul MacLean called a timeout with 17 seconds left in the third period with a 6–1 lead. Michel Therrien called Maclean classless while Maclean responded by saying that he was protecting his players from Montreal's dirty play in that game. The underdog Senators eventually won the series 4–1.

In the 2015 playoffs, they played in another playoff series. In game one, Montreal's P. K. Subban slashed Ottawa's Mark Stone — breaking his wrist — and Subban was later ejected. Senators' coach Dave Cameron called the slash vicious and said that Subban deserved a suspension. Ottawa's Clarke MacArthur called it a lumberjack slash, and Mark Stone said that he was being targeted all game. Meanwhile, Michel Therrien said that Subban did not deserve to be ejected and should have only gotten a minor penalty. The Canadiens won that game 4–3. The Montreal Canadiens won games two and three in overtime. Riding a 3–0 lead in the series, the Canadiens saw Ottawa win the next two games, before closing the series in game six with a 2–0 victory in Ottawa.

As of the end of the 2025–26 season, Montreal leads the current Ottawa Senators in the regular season record, 87–67–5–16, while Ottawa leads the playoff record, 6–5.

==== Montreal Canadiens vs. Toronto Maple Leafs ====
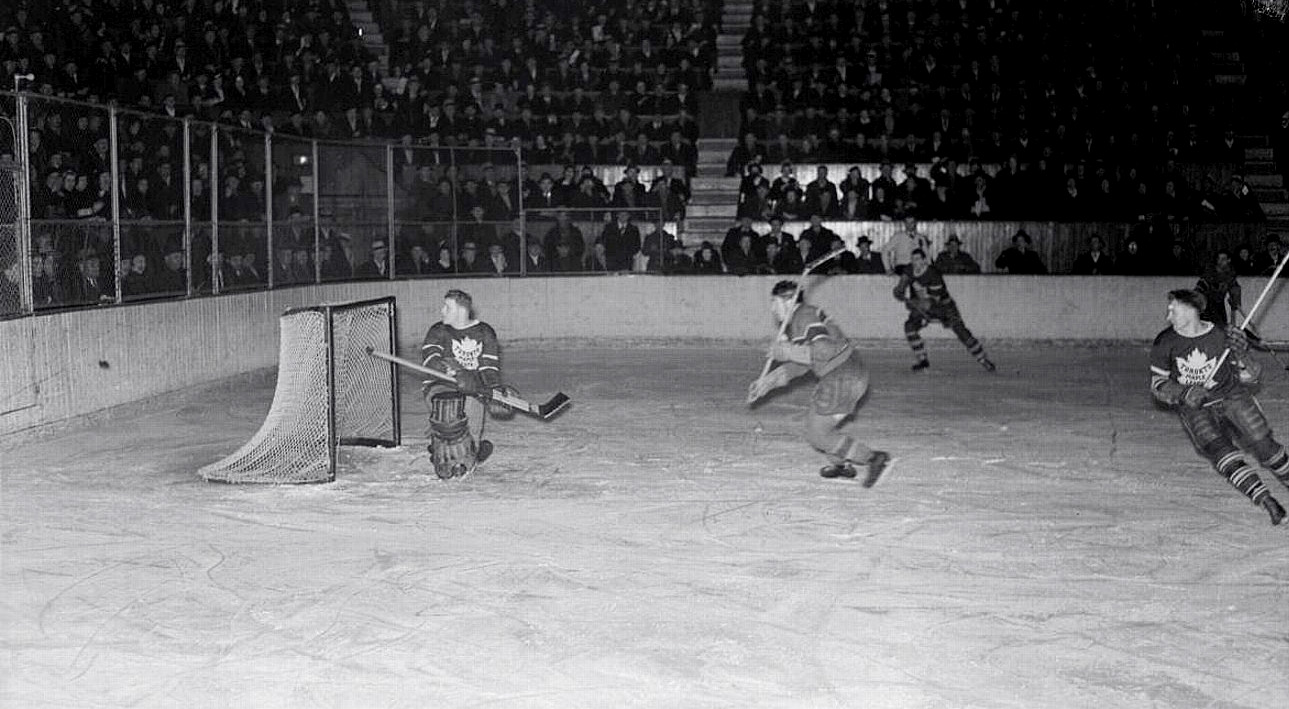
A game between the Canadiens and Maple Leafs in March 1938

The Canadiens–Maple Leafs rivalry is the longest-running in NHL history. From 1943 to 1979, the two teams met each other in the playoffs 15 times, and faced off in five Stanley Cup Finals. While the on-ice competition is fierce, the Leafs–Habs rivalry is symbolic of the rivalry between Canada's two largest cities: Toronto and Montreal, and by extension its two major linguistic groups, anglophones and francophones and their status as hubs for English Canada and French Canada, respectively.

The rivalry is illustrated in the iconic Roch Carrier short story "The Hockey Sweater". Published in 1979, it recalls an incident from his boyhood in 1946, Sainte-Justine, Quebec, as a childhood Canadiens fan whose mother mistakenly buys him a Toronto Maple Leafs sweater to wear in his neighbourhood hockey games. It remains a timeless favourite in Canadian literature.

Notably, the Canadiens and the Maple Leafs have won the most Stanley Cups in the NHL, with 24 and 13, respectively. As a result of their success, they have the two largest fanbases in the entire league – both teams have an influx of visiting fans in their home arenas when they play each other. However, neither team has won the cup since the 1990s when Montreal won the cup in 1993, and Toronto in 1967.

As of the end of the 2025–26 season, Montreal leads the regular season record, 370–304–88–14, and the playoff record, 46–32 against Toronto.

=== Metropolitan Division ===
The basic structure of the Metropolitan Division dates to the 1974 formation of the Patrick Division, which from 1981 onwards would have all its teams in the Mid-Atlantic States. It became the Atlantic Division (not the same as the current Atlantic Division) in 1993, and then the Metropolitan Division in 2013. The Metropolitan division boasts several of the NHL's longest and most storied rivalries.

==== Battle of New York: New York Islanders vs. New York Rangers ====
The Islanders–Rangers rivalry, also unofficially known as the "Battle of New York", is unique among New York City's major league sports, as the Islanders and Rangers are in the same conference and division, guaranteeing plenty of matchups – similar to the National Basketball Association's Brooklyn Nets and New York Knicks, who between 2015 and 2020 also shared arenas with the Islanders and Rangers, respectively. Major League Baseball's New York Yankees and New York Mets are in different leagues, as are the National Football League's New York Jets and New York Giants, so the only meeting opportunities are during inter-league or championship games.

As of the end of the 2025–26 season, the Rangers lead the regular season record, 142–130–19–10, while the Islanders lead the playoff record, 20–19.

==== Battle of Pennsylvania: Philadelphia Flyers vs. Pittsburgh Penguins ====
The Battle of Pennsylvania, which is the Philadelphia Flyers–Pittsburgh Penguins rivalry, began in 1967 when the teams were introduced into the NHL's "Next Six" expansion wave. The rivalry exists due to divisional alignment and geographic location, as both teams play in the state of Pennsylvania. In their 2012 Eastern Conference quarterfinals matchup, the rivalry strengthened with several on and off-ice incidents resulting in suspensions and fines. Philadelphia took a 3–0 series lead, and by the fourth game the two teams had combined to score an NHL-record 45 goals. The Flyers ultimately prevailed in game six, by which point the two teams had combined for 309 penalty minutes. At times, the rivalry has been considered by some to be the most heated in the league.

As of the end of the 2025–26 season, Philadelphia leads the regular season record, 169–106–30–14, and the playoff record, 25–22 against Pittsburgh.

==== Battle of the Hudson River: New Jersey Devils vs. New York Rangers ====
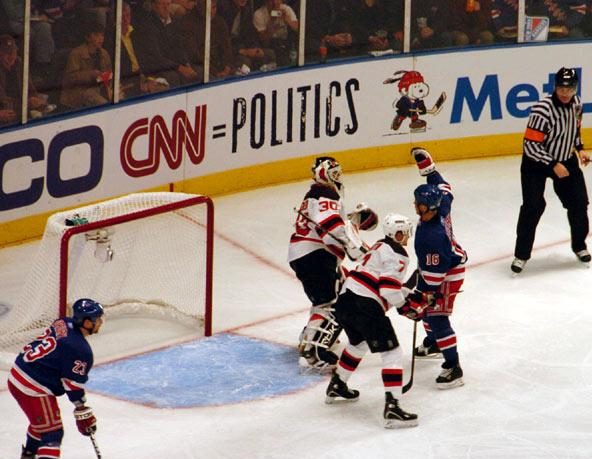
Rangers forward Sean Avery attempting to screen Devils goaltender Martin Brodeur during game three of the 2008 playoffs

The Devils–Rangers rivalry exists between two teams in the New York metropolitan area. The two teams are called "cross-river rivals." This is because Madison Square Garden in Midtown Manhattan, where the Rangers play, is less than ten miles and across the Hudson River from the Prudential Center in downtown Newark (and previously, the Meadowlands Arena in East Rutherford), the home arena of the Devils. Travel between both arenas is easily accomplished by road (usually through the Lincoln Tunnel), rapid transit (on the Port Authority Trans-Hudson (PATH) train) and rail (along the Northeast Corridor). The teams have met seven times in the playoffs, with the Rangers winning four times.

As of the end of the 2025–26 season, New York leads the regular season record, 115–95–21–11, and the playoff record, 21–20 against New Jersey.

==== Battle of the Turnpikes: New Jersey Devils vs. Philadelphia Flyers ====
The rivalry between the New Jersey Devils and Philadelphia Flyers is sometimes referred to as the "Battle of the Turnpikes." The Devils play in Newark, New Jersey, which can be accessed by using the New Jersey Turnpike and the Flyers play in Philadelphia, Pennsylvania, which is about twenty-five miles from the Pennsylvania Turnpike. The two turnpikes connect over the Delaware River on the border of Pennsylvania and New Jersey near Northeast Philadelphia and Burlington, New Jersey.

As of the end of the 2025–26 season, New Jersey leads the regular season record, 122–94–15–9, while both teams are tied in the playoff record, 14–14.

==== New York Islanders vs. Philadelphia Flyers ====
The Flyers and Islanders have met five times in the playoffs, with four of the meetings coming between 1975 and 1987. Their most notable playoff series was the 1980 Stanley Cup Final.

As of the end of the 2025–26 season, Philadelphia leads the regular season record, 150–105–26–19, and the playoff record, 17–15 against New York.

==== New York Islanders vs. Washington Capitals ====
The Capitals and Islanders had consistent playoff matchups during the 1980s and early 1990s.

As of the end of the 2025–26 season, Washington leads the regular season record, 129–100–13–7, while New York leads the playoff record, 25–17.

==== New York Rangers vs. Philadelphia Flyers ====
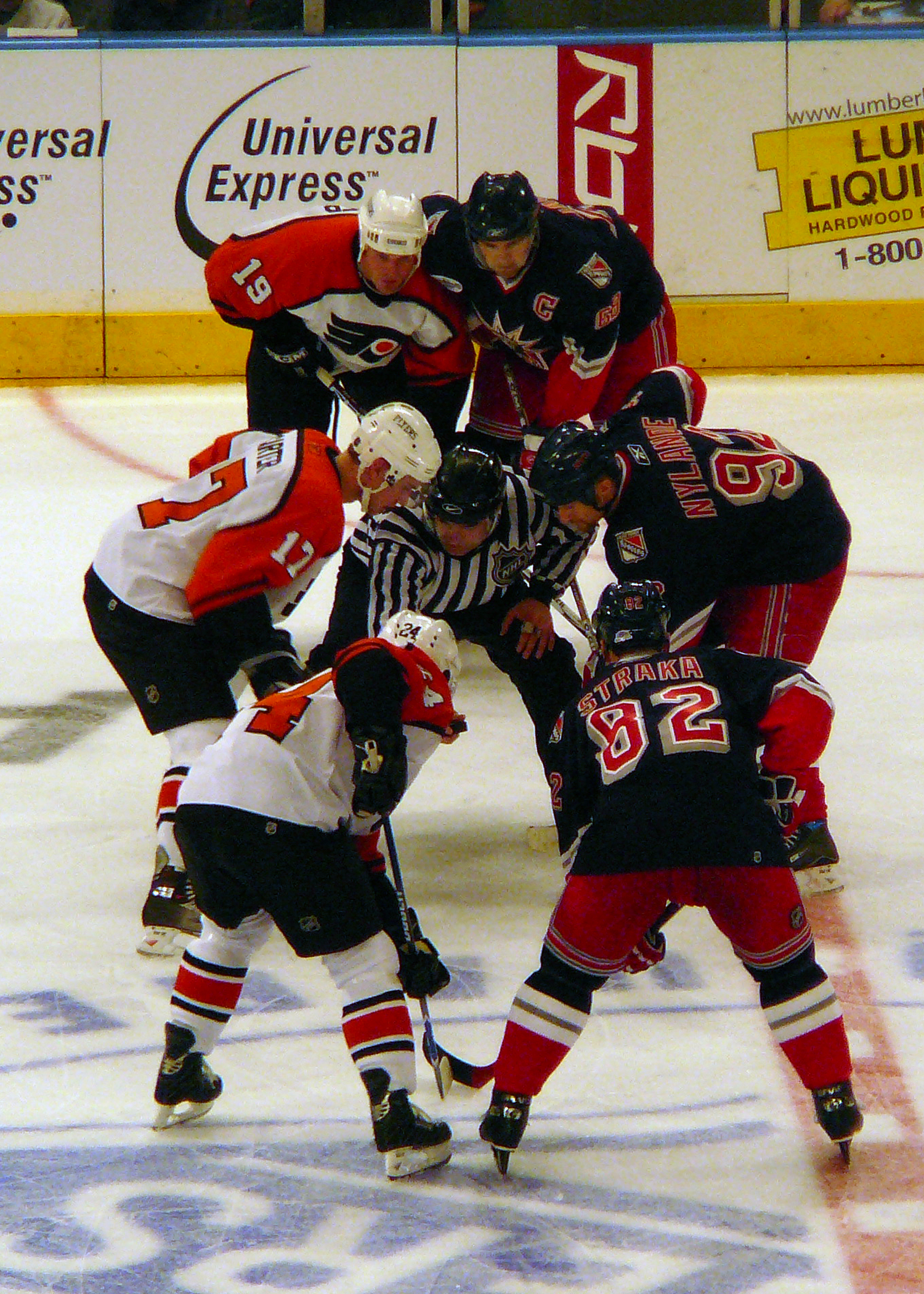
Skaters from the Rangers and Flyers prepare to face off during a game in January 2007

They have met 11 times in the Stanley Cup playoffs, with the Flyers winning six times, and have been division rivals since the 1974–75 season.

There is a long-standing rivalry between the sports fans from New York City and Philadelphia, which are approximately two hours apart by car, also seen in the Mets–Phillies rivalry in Major League Baseball, the Philadelphia 76ers and the New York Knicks in the National Basketball Association, and the Eagles–Giants rivalry in the National Football League.

As of the end of the 2025–26 season, New York leads the regular season record, 149–128–37–12, while Philadelphia leads the playoff record, 30–24.

==== New York Rangers vs. Pittsburgh Penguins ====
Both franchises have been part of the same division on four different occasions: with the Patrick Division from 1981 to 1993, from 1998 to 2013 as part of the Atlantic Division, since 2013 as part of the Metropolitan Division, and in the 2020–21 season as part of the East Division.

The Penguins and Rangers met in eight playoff series, with the Penguins winning five of them. Between 1989 and 1996, the two teams met thrice in the playoffs. A memorable moment of those confrontations came in the 1992 Patrick Division finals, in which the Penguins upset the Presidents' Trophy-winning Rangers in six games en route to winning the second of their back-to-back Stanley Cups. That series was remembered for Lemieux breaking his left wrist following a controversial slashing penalty from Adam Graves in game two, and Ron Francis' overtime winner in game four.

During the early 21st century (2000s and 2010s), the Penguins and Rangers met four times in the playoffs, with each team winning two series each. Both teams, led by Sidney Crosby, Evgeni Malkin, and Marc-Andre Fleury (Pittsburgh), Ryan Callahan, Chris Kreider, and Henrik Lundqvist (New York Rangers) respectively, after their 2008 playoff meeting, they met in three consecutive postseason series from 2014 to 2016. In 2014, the Rangers came back from a 3–1 series deficit to win the series in seven games, en route to making the Stanley Cup Final. In both 2015 and 2016, the two teams exchanged five-game first round series victories, with the Penguins eventually taking home the Stanley Cup in the latter year.

In 2022, both teams met again in the first round. The Penguins obtained a 3–1 series lead, except the Rangers again came back to win in seven games. This was the second time the Penguins blew a 3–1 lead against the Rangers, as well as the fourth time in franchise history that the Penguins have done so.

As of the end of the 2025–26 season, New York leads the regular season record, 144–123–23–17, while Pittsburgh leads the playoff record, 27–17.

==== New York Rangers vs. Washington Capitals ====
The Capitals and Rangers have been rivals since the Capitals joined the Patrick Division in 1979. The teams have had batches of playoff series such as three series between 1990–1994 and five series between 2009 and 2015. They first met in the 1986 Patrick Division finals, which New York won in six games. Their first batch of frequent playoff series started in 1990 with the Capitals defeating the Rangers in five games. The Capitals defeated them in the following year's Patrick Division semifinals in six games. During their Stanley Cup run, the Rangers defeated the Capitals in five games in the conference quarterfinals in 1994. The two teams did not meet in the playoffs until 2009, which Washington defeated New York in seven games. The two teams met again in 2011, with the Capitals emerging victorious in five games. The next three series were won by New York, all in seven games, in 2012, 2013, and 2015 with the latter series being a 3–1 series comeback.

On May 3, 2021, when Capitals forward Tom Wilson punched Rangers forward Pavel Buchnevich for being aggressive toward his teammate, goaltender Vitek Vanecek. He also injured forward Artemi Panarin after a scrum. Wilson was fined $5,000, the maximum allowable under the NHL's collective bargaining agreement (CBA). The Rangers later called George Parros, the head of the NHL Department of Player Safety, unfit to continue serving the role. Two days later, on May 5, a line brawl ensued after the actions of the game precedent. Six misconduct penalties (fighting majors) were placed in 4:14 of the first period. The night after the brawl, on May 6, the Rangers were fined $250,000 by the NHL. The two teams then met in the 2024 Eastern Conference first round, with the Rangers sweeping the Capitals in four games.

As of the end of the 2025–26 season, Washington leads the regular season record, 122–103–18–8, while New York leads the playoff record, 31–28.

==== Philadelphia Flyers vs. Washington Capitals ====
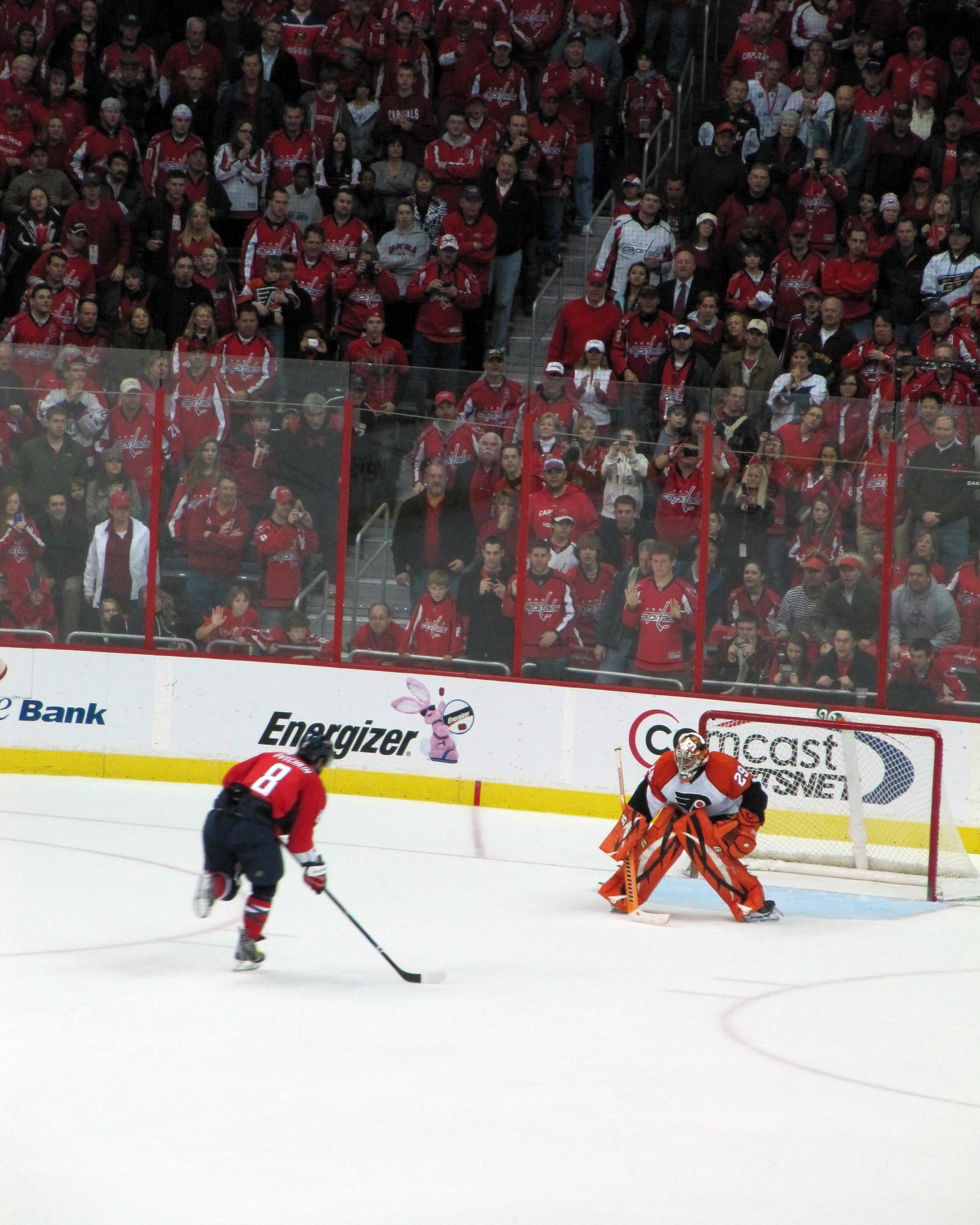
Capitals winger Alex Ovechkin prepares to take a shot against Flyers goaltender Ray Emery in January 2010

The Flyers and Capitals have been rivals through the 1980s, dating back to their days in the Patrick Division. In 1984, Mike Gartner lead the Capitals to a three-game sweep of the Flyers in the 1984 Patrick Division semifinals for the Capitals' first ever playoff series victory, and in the process ending the careers of Bobby Clarke and Bill Barber, the last two players of the Broad Street Bullies era. The Capitals then trailed the Flyers three games to one in 1988 Patrick Division semifinals. Washington would rally to win the next three games to take the series in seven games capped off by Dale Hunter's overtime goal in game seven. The following year, Tim Kerr and Ron Hextall helped the Flyers take down the division champion Capitals in the 1989 Patrick Division semifinals, exacting revenge for their 1988 defeat.

Both teams met in the 2008 Eastern Conference quarterfinals which the Flyers won in overtime on a power play goal by Joffrey Lupul in the seventh game. During a regular season game in 2013, there was an all-out line-brawl between the two teams. Washington would win the game 7–0. Both teams met in the 2016 Eastern Conference first round, with the Capitals winning the series four games to two after winning the first three games.

As of the end of the 2025–26 season, Philadelphia leads the regular season record, 126–94–19–11, while Washington leads the playoff record, 16–14.

==== Pittsburgh Penguins vs. Washington Capitals ====
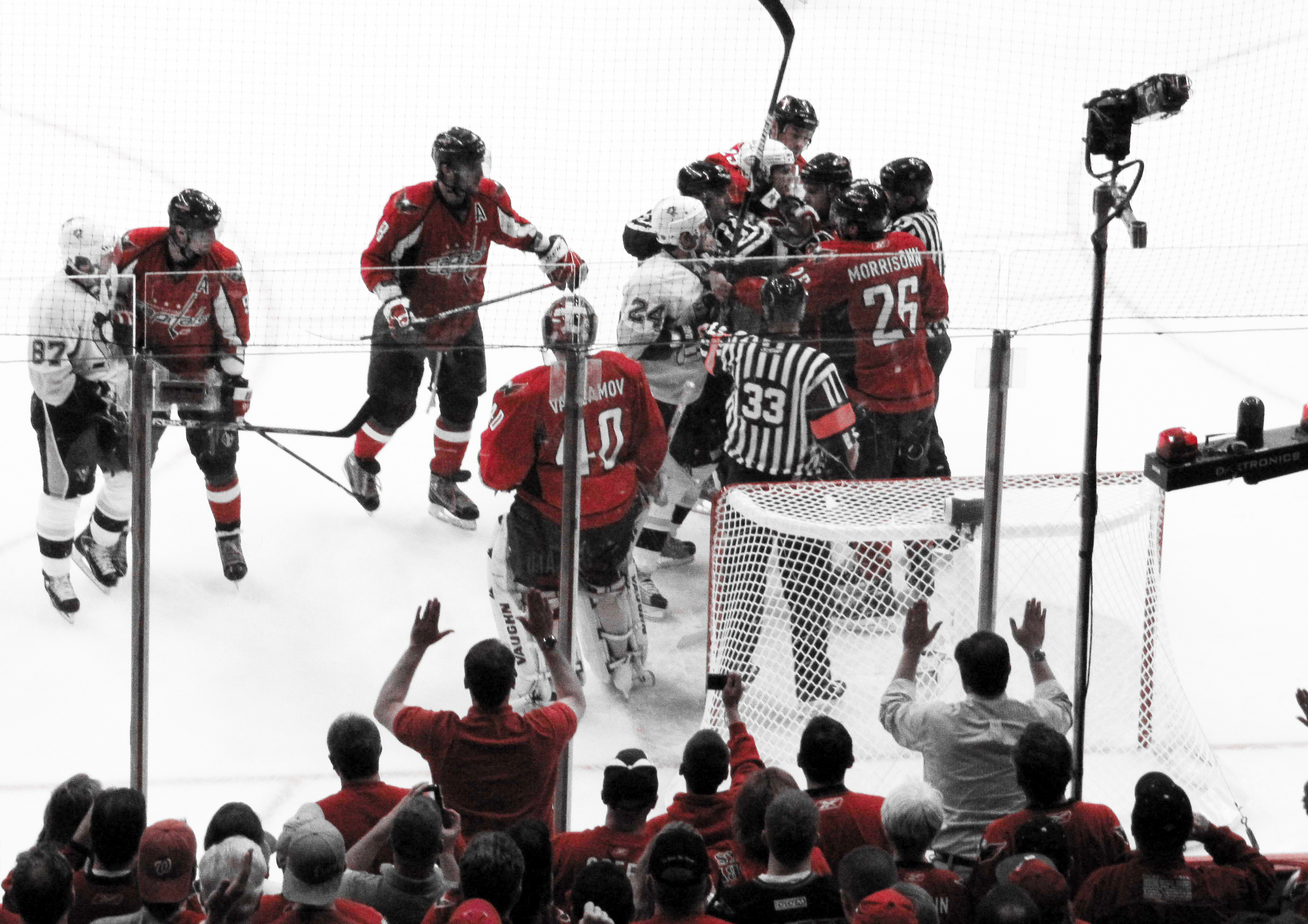
An altercation between the Penguins and the Capitals during game one of the 2009 playoffs

These two teams played in the Patrick Division together from 1981 to 1993, and have been part of the Metro Division since 2013. In total, the two teams have met 11 times in the playoffs. Despite trailing in nine of the eleven series, Pittsburgh has won all but the 1994 Eastern Conference quarterfinals and the 2018 Eastern Conference second round. The teams first met in the 1991 Patrick Division finals, when the Penguins defeated the Capitals in five en route to capturing the Stanley Cup. All six Stanley Cups championship seasons combined between Washington and Pittsburgh, have involved a playoff series against the other team. The rivalry has often involved consecutives series matchups such as 1991 and 1992, 1994, 1995, and 1996, and 2016, 2017, and 2018.

With the drafting and emergence of first round picks Alexander Ovechkin in Washington, and Sidney Crosby in Pittsburgh, the teams have had controversial moments such as comments that Alexander Semin made about Crosby in the media and physical altercations taking place between Ovechkin and Malkin during games. One of the best series to date between the teams was the 2009 Eastern Conference semifinals, in which the Capitals took a 2–0 series lead before being defeated in seven games, ending with a 6–2 game seven loss at the Verizon Center. Just like in 1991 and 1992, the Penguins defeated the Capitals in the playoffs en route to the Stanley Cup. The two teams faced off at the 2011 Winter Classic hosted in Pittsburgh at Heinz Field, with the Capitals emerging victorious 3–1, and a hit in the game resulted in Crosby missing nearly all of two seasons with concussion-related issues. Both teams completed their second playoff confrontation in the Ovechkin-Crosby era in the 2016 Stanley Cup playoffs with the Penguins winning in six games, again preceding Pittsburgh's fourth Stanley Cup title. In 2017, these two teams met again in the second round. Pittsburgh gained a 3–1 series lead only to see Washington win the next two games. The Penguins shut out the Capitals at Verizon Center in Washington, D.C. to advance to the Eastern Conference finals and eventually the franchise's fifth Stanley Cup. The two teams met again in the 2018 Stanley Cup playoffs in the second round for the third consecutive year. The Washington Capitals defeated the Pittsburgh Penguins in six games to advance to the Eastern Conference finals, and eventually win the Stanley Cup.

As of the end of the 2025–26 season, Pittsburgh leads the regular season record, 126–105–16–7, and the playoff record, 40–28 against Washington.

=== Interdivisional ===
==== Boston Bruins vs. New York Rangers ====
The NHL's extension of the Boston–New York rivalry – present in the other leagues with the Red Sox–Yankees rivalry, Celtics–Knicks rivalry, Giants–Patriots rivalry and Jets–Patriots rivalry – had its peak during the 1970s, but saw a resurgence in the 2010s. In the Original Six era, the teams had six matchups, with the Rangers only winning in 1928 and 1940 – both on the way to a Stanley Cup title. Between 1970 and 1973, where the Rangers' GAG line and the Bruins led by Bobby Orr and Phil Esposito had strong showings; the teams met three times, with the highest point being the 1972 Stanley Cup Final, which the Bruins won in six games. However, the Rangers won in five games in 1973. 40 years passed before the next series between the Bruins and Rangers, and in 2013 the Bruins eliminated the Rangers in five games. The Bruins have won seven of 10 playoffs series between the teams.

As of the end of the 2025–26 season, Boston leads the regular season record, 307–257–97–14, and the playoff record, 26–19–2 against New York.

==== Boston Bruins vs. Philadelphia Flyers ====
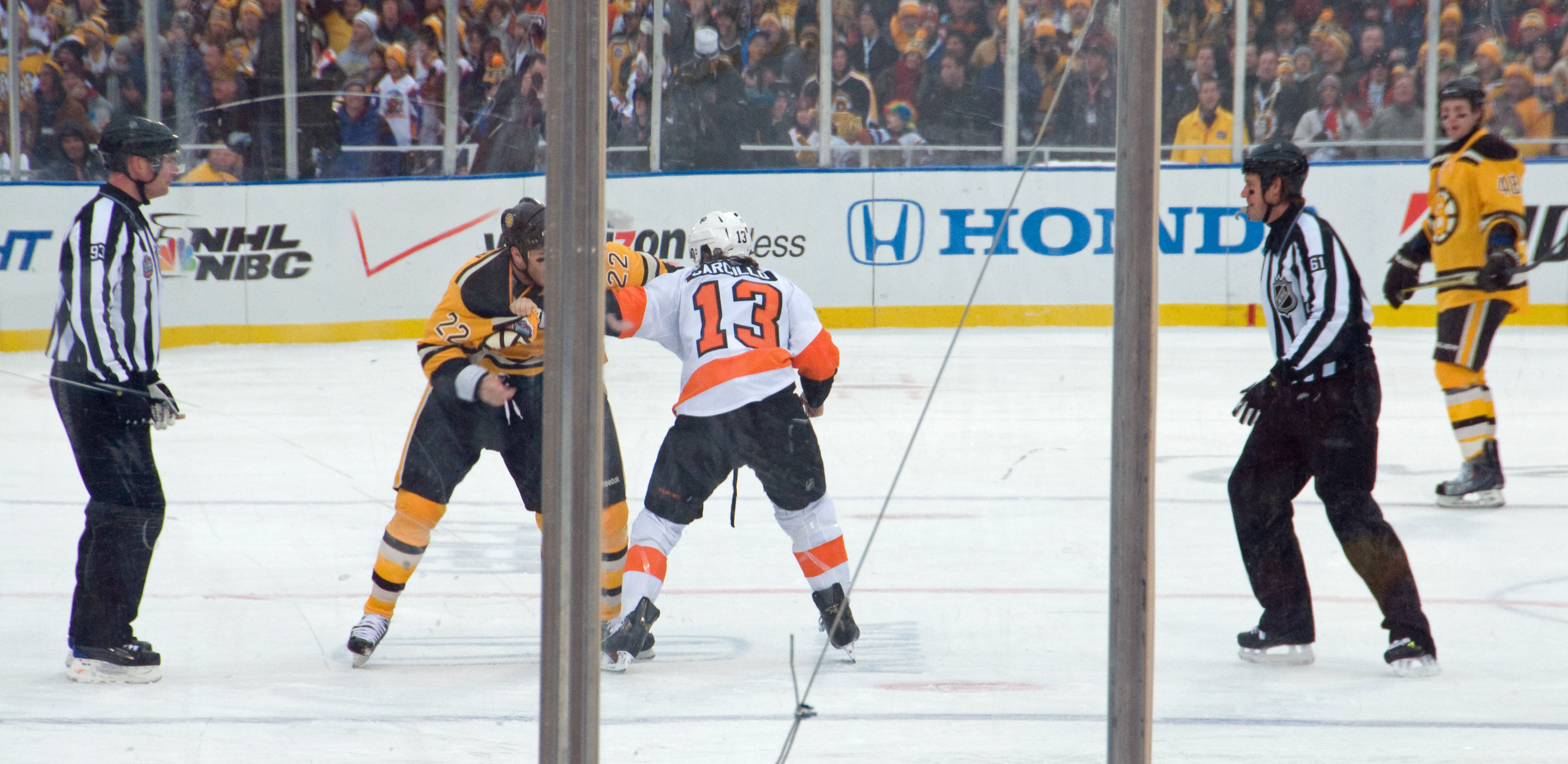
Shawn Thornton of the Bruins and Dan Carcillo of the Flyers fight during the 2010 Winter Classic

The rivalry between the Boston Bruins and Philadelphia Flyers dates back to the 1970s, where both teams had frequent playoff matchups. In the early 1970s, both the Bruins and Flyers played similar styles that compared evenly to each other, with the Bruins being known as the "Big Bad Bruins" and the Flyers as the "Broad Street Bullies." The most notable of meetings between the two were in the 1974 Stanley Cup Final, with the Bruins, led by Bobby Orr and Phil Esposito, and Flyers, led by Bobby Clarke and Bernie Parent. The Flyers would complete an upset, defeating the Bruins in six games. The two teams met each other again in the semifinals in the 1976, 1977, and 1978 playoffs, but would not meet each other again in the playoffs until 2010. Prior to the playoff meeting, the two teams squared off in the 2010 Winter Classic at Fenway Park, with the Bruins winning the game 2–1 in overtime. When the two teams met in the playoffs that year, the Bruins managed a 3–0 series lead, but the Flyers would become the third team in NHL history to complete a 3–0 comeback, winning the series four games to three, which also included overcoming a 3–0 deficit in the decisive game seven. The Bruins would face the Flyers again in the next year's playoffs by sweeping the Flyers in the conference semifinals en route to their 2011 Stanley Cup win. In total, the Bruins and Flyers have met in the playoffs six times, with each team winning three series.

As of the end of the 2025–26 season, Boston leads the regular season record, 123–66–21–14, and the playoff record, 18–14 against Philadelphia.

== Western Conference ==
There are significantly fewer major rivalries in the NHL's Western Conference, due to this conference being much newer (its predecessor – the West Division – was created in 1967, while the conference was created in 1974) and only one of the conference's teams – the Chicago Blackhawks – predates the conference's creation. Geographically, its teams are generally spread much farther apart than those of the Eastern Conference.

=== Central Division ===
The Central Division was essentially formed as the Norris Division in 1974. From 1981 onward, it would have all the Central Time Zone teams in the US and the Eastern Time Zone teams not in the Wales Conference. It became the Central Division in 1993.

==== Chicago Blackhawks vs. Minnesota Wild ====
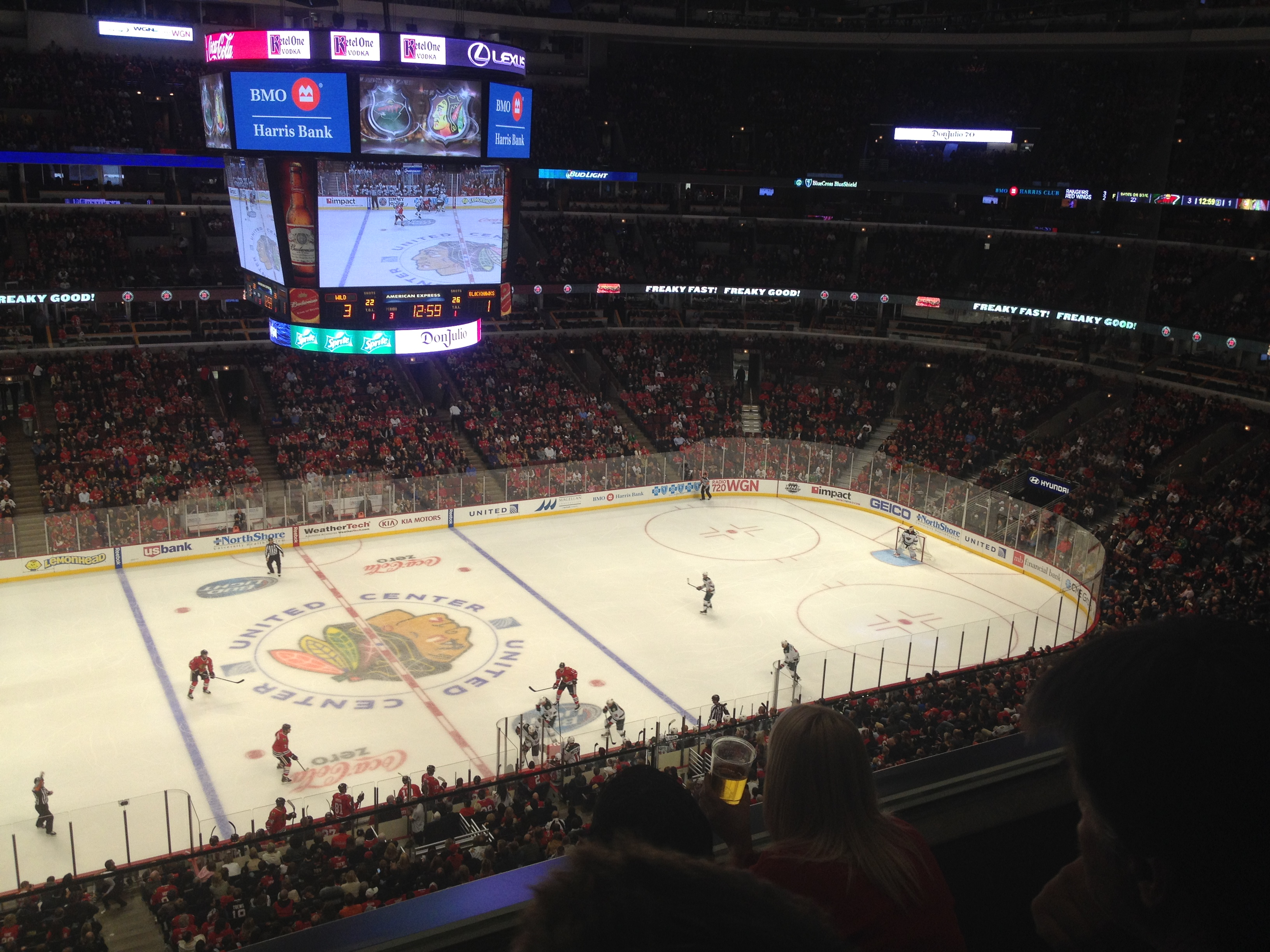
A game between the Blackhawks and Wild in October 2013

The Blackhawks–Wild rivalry started when the two teams met in the 2013 Western Conference quarterfinals. The Blackhawks won in five games in that series en route to their fifth Stanley Cup. The NHL realignment that took place during the 2013 off-season placed both teams within the Central Division. The two markets have major rivalries in two other sports leagues; the NFL with the Bears–Vikings and the Twins–White Sox rivalries in MLB.

The rivalry between the two hockey teams became even more intense with another playoff meeting between the Blackhawks and the Wild in the 2014 Western Conference second round. The Blackhawks once again turned out victorious, this time winning in six games. In the 2015 Western Conference second round, the Blackhawks and the Wild met once again. The Blackhawks won yet again, but this time, in a four-game sweep en route to their sixth Stanley Cup. During the 2015 All Star Weekend in Columbus, the League announced two NHL Stadium Series games and the 2016 Winter Classic. Game one of the 2016 Stadium Series featured the Blackhawks and the Wild at TCF Bank Stadium in Minneapolis, Minnesota on February 21, 2016. Minnesota won the game 6–1.

As of the end of the 2025–26 season, Minnesota leads the regular season record, 60–30–1–5, while Chicago leads the playoff record, 12–3.

==== Chicago Blackhawks vs. St. Louis Blues ====
The Blackhawks–Blues rivalry features the Chicago Blackhawks and St. Louis Blues. From 1970–71 to 2019–20, the two teams have been in the same division together. However, the teams were placed into separate divisions for the 2020–21 season as a result of the COVID-19 pandemic. It is the most intense rivalry in terms of penalty minutes and fighting. At the height of the rivalry throughout the 1980s and early 1990s, it was common to go to a Chicago vs. St. Louis game and see a brawl break out. The most famous brawl of this era was the St. Patrick's Day Massacre. All six Sutter Brothers would play for this rivalry.

As of the end of the 2025–26 season, Chicago leads the regular season record, 157–134–35–12, and the playoff record, 35–28 against St. Louis.

=== Pacific Division ===
The Pacific Division dates back to the 1974 formation of the Smythe Division, which from 1981–onward would contain the westernmost teams in the NHL. It became the Pacific Division in 1993.

==== Anaheim Ducks vs. San Jose Sharks ====
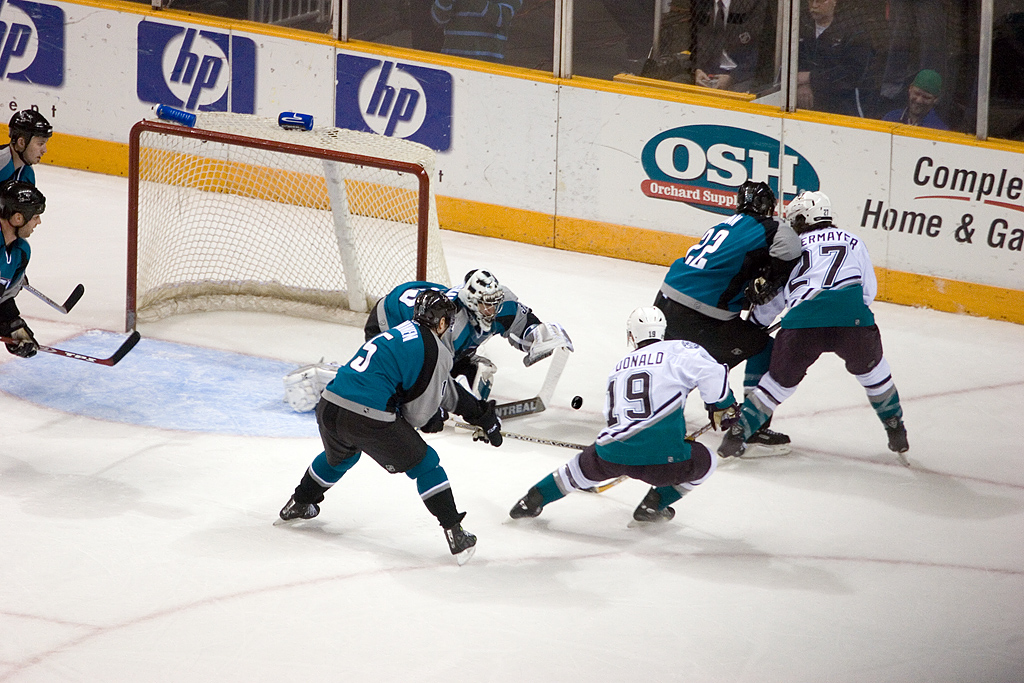
A game between the Ducks and Sharks in April 2006

The Ducks–Sharks rivalry has been going since 1993 when the Ducks came into existence. The rivalry got heated when the two faced each other in the 2009 Stanley Cup playoffs. The Ducks won the series 4–2. Both teams met again in the 2018 playoffs, where the Sharks swept the Ducks 4–0 in the first round.

As of the end of the 2025–26 season, San Jose leads the regular season record, 83–64–4–19, and the playoff record, 6–4 against Anaheim.

==== Battle of Alberta: Calgary Flames vs. Edmonton Oilers ====
The Battle of Alberta is the bitter rivalry between the Calgary Flames and Edmonton Oilers. The two teams are based in the cities of Edmonton, the provincial capital of Alberta, and Calgary, the province's most populous city. Most often it is used to describe sporting events between the two cities, although this is not exclusive as the rivalry predates organized sports in Alberta. The rivalry peaked during the mid-late 1980s, as from 1983 to 1990 the Western Conference only had two different champions, both being Calgary and Edmonton. They frequently played each other in the playoffs, with three series going seven games.

As of the end of the 2025–26 season, Calgary leads the regular season record, 134–111–18–7, while Edmonton leads the playoff record, 23–12.

==== Calgary Flames vs. Vancouver Canucks ====
The Canucks–Flames rivalry is a rivalry between the Vancouver Canucks and Calgary Flames. The two teams have played in the same division since the 1981–82 NHL division realignment.

As of the end of the 2025–26 season, Calgary leads the regular season record, 137–89–26–20, and the playoff record, 21–17 against Vancouver.

==== Edmonton Oilers vs. Los Angeles Kings ====
The rivalry between the Edmonton Oilers and Los Angeles Kings features two teams whom have played in the same division after the Oilers were instated into the NHL following the dissolution of the WHA in 1979. Both teams quickly became fierce divisional opponents with frequent playoff matchups occurring, in addition to the notorious trade of Wayne Gretzky and Marty McSorley. Both the Kings and Oilers have combined for seven Stanley Cups between them. Both teams have met in the playoffs eleven times.

As of the end of the 2025–26 season, Edmonton leads the regular season record, 109–91–30–5, and the playoff record, 40–20 against Los Angeles.

==== Freeway Face-Off: Anaheim Ducks vs. Los Angeles Kings ====
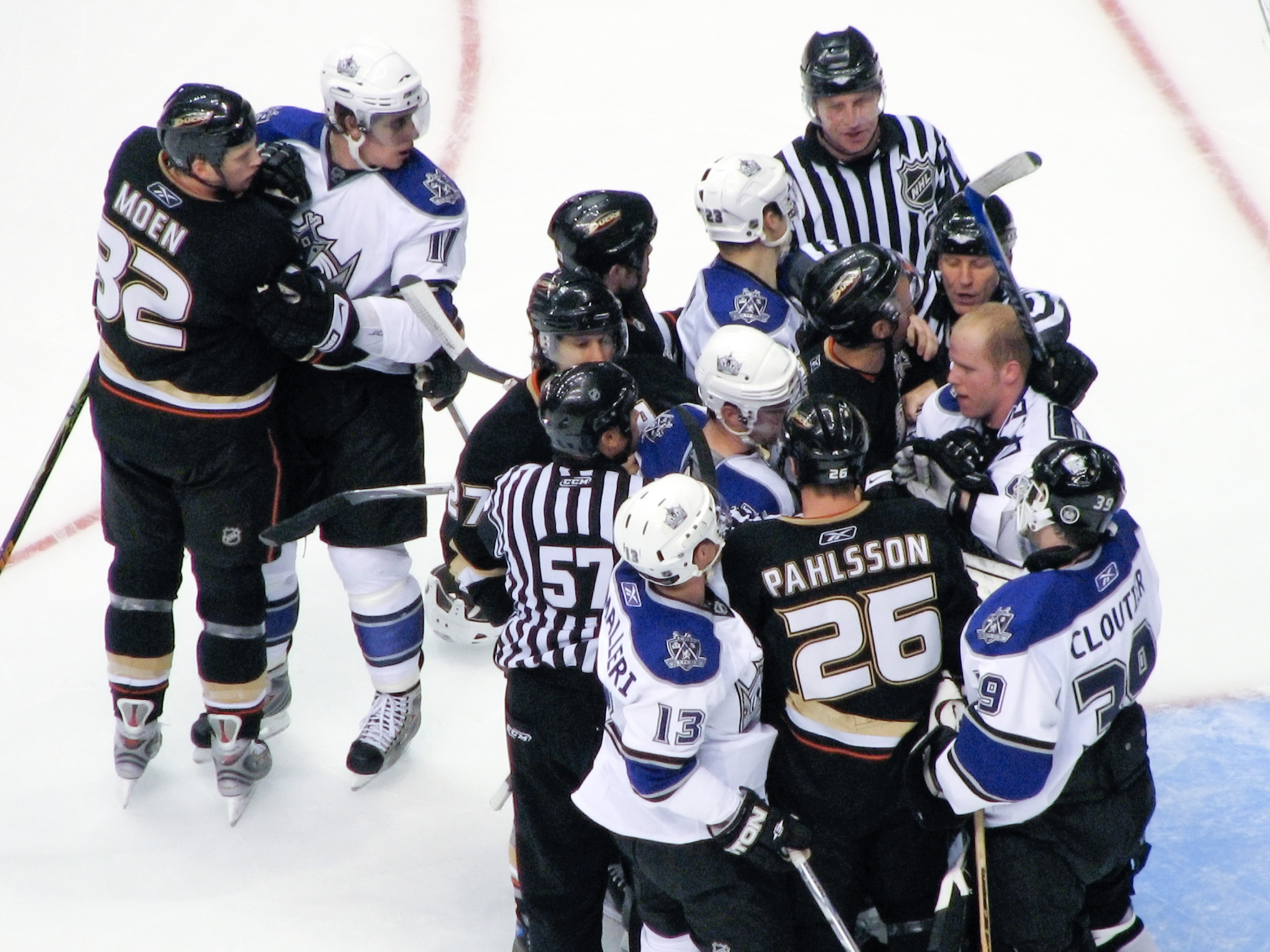
An altercation between the Ducks and Kings in April 2008

The term Freeway Face-Off refers to a series of games played between the Anaheim Ducks and Los Angeles Kings. The series takes its name from the massive freeway system in the greater Los Angeles metropolitan area, the home of both teams; one can travel from one team's arena to the other simply by traveling along Interstate 5. The two teams have also faced off in an outdoor game at Dodger Stadium, in which the Ducks won 3–0. The two teams have met only once in the playoffs, during the 2014 Stanley Cup playoffs, of which the Kings won four games to three. The Kings would eventually go on to win the Stanley Cup that year. The term is akin to the Freeway Series which refers to meetings between the Los Angeles area baseball teams, the Los Angeles Angels and the Los Angeles Dodgers.

As of the end of the 2025–26 season, Los Angeles leads the regular season record, 81–58–11–21, and the playoff record, 4–3 against Anaheim.

==== Los Angeles Kings vs. San Jose Sharks ====
The rivalry between Los Angeles (Kings) and the San Francisco Bay Area (Sharks) NHL teams began as a result of the 1967 NHL expansion, which established both the Los Angeles Kings and the California Golden Seals. At the time, the Kings and Seals were the only NHL teams located west of the Mississippi River (the St. Louis Blues and the Minnesota North Stars were located on that river), and thus were created for each other to both reduce the amount of travel each team would need to do and to gain a foothold on the West Coast, previously the province of the borderline-major Western Hockey League, of which the Seals had been a member. The Seals were a historically unsuccessful team and left the Bay Area in 1976; the team ceased to exist when its successor, Cleveland Barons, merged with the Minnesota North Stars in 1978.

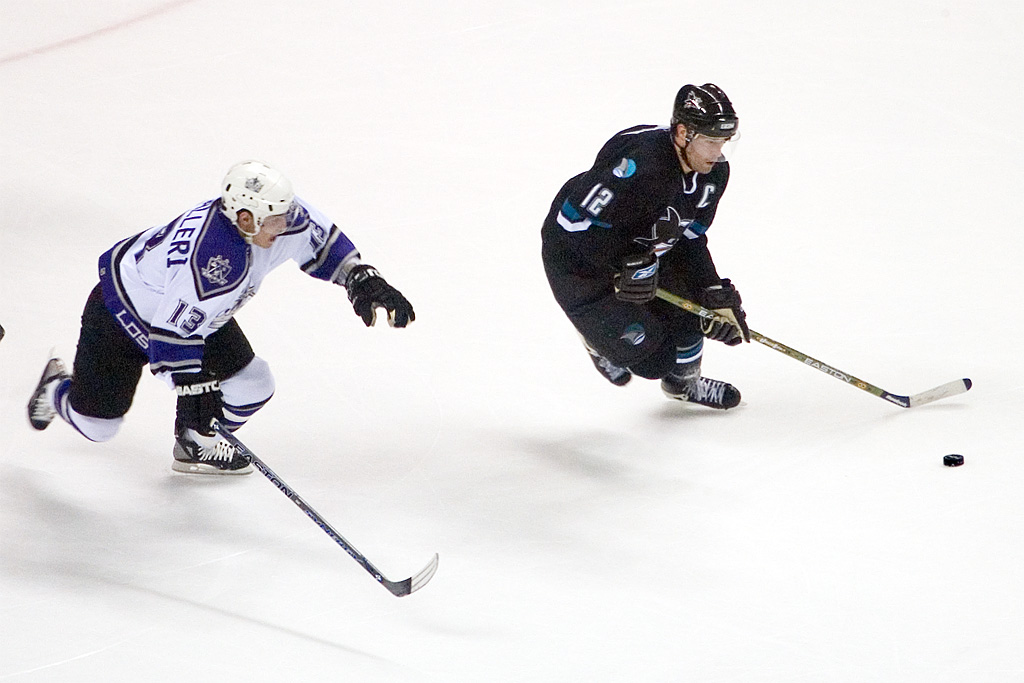
Sharks captain Patrick Marleau skates with the puck as he is pursued by Kings' winger Michael Cammalleri

The Kings–Sharks rivalry started in 1991, when the San Jose was awarded a team and expansion team. The Kings and Sharks met in the playoffs for the first time in the 2011 Western Conference quarterfinals. San Jose eliminated Los Angeles in six games with Joe Thornton scoring the series-winning overtime goal in game six. The two teams faced each other again in the 2013 Western Conference semifinals, with the Kings winning the series 4–3 that saw the home team winning every game.

The Kings and Sharks met again in the playoffs for the second consecutive year in the 2014 first round. San Jose had home-ice advantage and gained to a 3–0 series lead, winning on home ice 6–3 and 7–2 before edging the Kings at Staples Center 4–3 in overtime. The Kings then rebounded to send the series back to San Jose with a 6–3 victory in game four before winning on the road 3–0 in game 5 to head back to Los Angeles. A 4–1 win in Los Angeles for the Kings brought the series to seven games, with the Kings becoming just the ninth team in history to force a game seven after being down 3–0 in the series. Given the chance to become just the fourth team in NHL history, the Kings won 5–1 in San Jose to win the series en route to their second Stanley Cup. In February 2015, the two teams faced off against each other in the 2015 Stadium Series, an outdoor game at Levi's Stadium. The Kings won the game 2–1.

Following a season where the Kings and Sharks missed the playoffs, both teams met in the 2016 first round. San Jose won in five games, en route to the Stanley Cup Final.

As of the end of the 2025–26 season, San Jose leads the regular season record, 96–68–7–12, and the playoff record, 14–11 against Los Angeles.

==== Los Angeles Kings vs. Vegas Golden Knights ====
The Golden Knights joined the league as an expansion team prior to the 2017–18 NHL season. The Kings were longtime members of the league, particularly since their founding in 1967. The Golden Knights instantly experienced playoff success upon their first season; reaching the 2018 Stanley Cup Final and eventually winning the 2023 Stanley Cup Final. At the time of the Knights' inception, the Kings had playoff pedigree, winning two Stanley Cups in the process. Both teams played an annual preseason game in Salt Lake City known as the Frozen Fury, which occurred between 2018 and 2023. The Kings in 2020 and 2023 traded longtime fan-favorite players Alec Martinez and goaltender Jonathan Quick respectively to Vegas, and both became pivotal pieces in the team's 2023 Stanley Cup victory. The two teams have met once in the postseason during the 2018 first round, with the Golden Knights winning the series in a 4–0 sweep.

As of the end of the 2025–26 season, Los Angeles leads the regular season record, 19–18–0–3, while Vegas has a playoff record, 4–0 against Los Angeles.

==== San Jose Sharks vs. Vegas Golden Knights ====
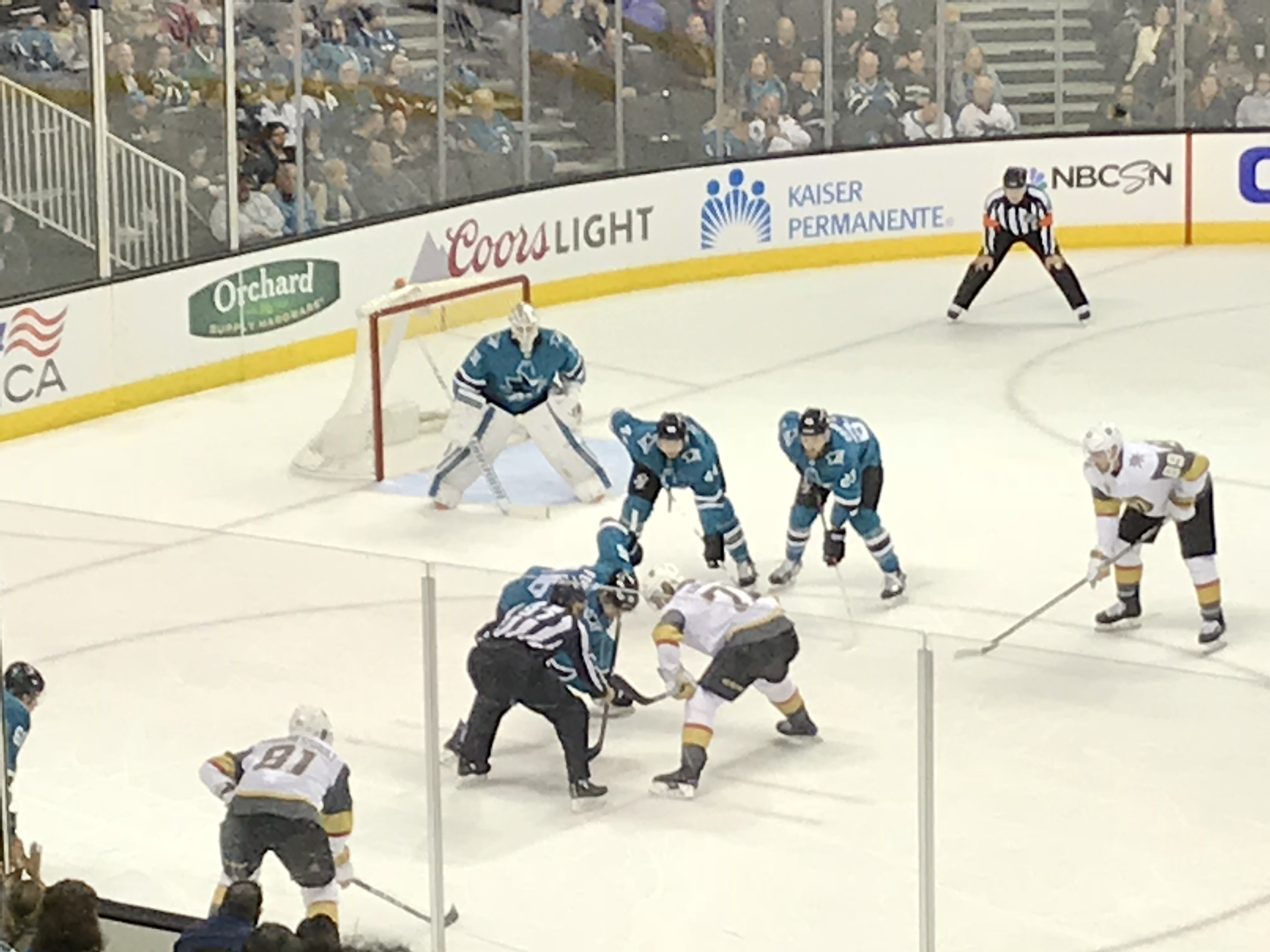
The Sharks and Golden Knights prepare to take a face off in March 2018

The Golden Knights–Sharks rivalry started during the 2017–18 season in which Vegas began playing. Both teams met in the playoffs in the 2018 Western Conference second round after both teams swept their opponents in the first round, which Vegas won in six games. During the 2018–19 NHL season, the rivalry became intense. With both teams set to play each other in the first round of the playoffs, the two teams met in a regular season game on March 30, 2019, to decide decided home-ice advantage during that first round match up for which the Sharks won 4–3 in overtime. In the 2019 Western Conference first round, the Golden Knights took a 3–1 series lead. Game three saw Golden Knights enforcer Ryan Reaves call out Sharks forward Evander Kane after the two fought each other. After a victorious game five at home, the Sharks forced a seventh game with Tomas Hertl's double overtime goal. Prior to game seven, both head coaches took shots at each other with Sharks coach Peter DeBoer calling out Gerard Gallant for chirping at players while Gallant responded by saying, "For that clown to say that in the paper yesterday is not right." In game seven, the Knights took a 3–0 lead in the third period, however, Vegas forward Cody Eakin was given a questionable and controversial major penalty for cross-checking which injured Sharks captain Joe Pavelski, (later forcing the NHL to introduce a new rule, effective the following season, to review all major penalties except for fighting from a monitor in a scorer's table; officials will reserve authority to reduce the penalty to a minor penalty depending on the result of the review). San Jose scored four goals in 4:01 on the ensuing power play to take the lead late, but with 47.0 seconds left, the Golden Knights forward Jonathan Marchessault tied it up to send the game into overtime. In overtime, Sharks forward Barclay Goodrow completed the comeback, ending the Knights season and propelling the Sharks into a second round matchup with the Colorado Avalanche. In a pre-season game between the two teams on September 29, 2019, multiple fights broke out, including two line brawls. The teams accumulated a total of 106 penalty minutes between them, with Sharks forward Evander Kane alone accumulating 27. Multiple game misconducts were given out and Kane was ejected for abuse of officials, being later given a three-game suspension.

On January 15, 2020, Peter DeBoer was hired as the head coach of the Golden Knights after being fired by the Sharks on December 11, 2019, replacing Gerard Gallant, who was fired the same day. Although since then the rivalry has largely been dormant in recent years as the Sharks entered a rebuild for a few years while also trading away key players from the 2018 and 2019 playoff teams including sending Hertl to Vegas in 2024. Vegas also had won the Stanley Cup in 2023 as well at a time where the Sharks were starting the rebuild as well.

As of the end of the 2025–26 season, Vegas leads the regular season record, 31–2–0–5, and the playoff record, 7–6 against San Jose.

== Historical ==
=== Battle of New England: Boston Bruins vs. Hartford Whalers (1979–1997) ===
They first played against each other in the 1979–80 season with the Bruins flourishing during the season while the expansion Whalers played awfully that year. The Whalers have played the Bruins twice in the playoffs in 1990 and 1991, with the Bruins winning both times. The rivalry got to a heating point when the Bruins' Cam Neely and the Whalers' Ulf Samuelsson would fight on a regular occasion. It got to a point where Samuelsson hit Neely in the knees during the 1991 Stanley Cup playoffs, but Samuelsson was traded to the Penguins earlier that season. The rivalry ended in 1997 when the Whalers relocated to Raleigh, North Carolina.

In the 2018–19 season, the rivalry had a callback. The Hurricanes wore the Whalers late 1980s jerseys in two games against the Bruins, one in Raleigh, proclaimed as “Whalers Night” and one in Boston. The series was split 1–1. The Hurricanes then brought back the same jerseys again on March 23, 2023, in Raleigh against the Bruins. Boston's David Pastrnak scored his 50th goal of the season, a feat not seen since Cam Neely did in 1994. Boston would win the game in a shootout, 4–3, bringing that renewed rivalry to a 2–1 count for Boston.

Before the Whalers moved to Raleigh, Boston won the regular season record, 70–41–13–0, and the playoff record, 8–5 for a total of 78–46–13–0 against Hartford.

=== Battle of Quebec: Montreal Canadiens vs. Quebec Nordiques (1979–1995) ===
The Battle of Quebec is the nickname for a former NHL rivalry between the Montreal Canadiens and Quebec Nordiques. The rivalry lasted from 1979–80 to 1994–95. The teams played against each other five times in the NHL playoffs, and the Canadiens won three of the series. One meeting, in 1984, resulted in the Good Friday Massacre, a game in which multiple brawls happened. The Battle of Quebec extended to politics, in which the Canadiens and Nordiques became symbols for rival parties, and beer distribution, as the teams were both owned by competing breweries. The Nordiques' departure from Quebec City to become the Colorado Avalanche in 1995 ended the rivalry.

Before the Nordiques moved to Denver, Montreal won the all-time regular season record, 62–39–12–0, and the playoff record, 17–14, for a total of 79–53–12–0 against Quebec.

=== Calgary Flames vs. Winnipeg Jets (original) (1980–1996) ===
The Flames and Jets (the original incarnation) both competed in the Western Conference. The Flames and the original Jets met in the playoffs four times (three straight years in the 1980s), with Winnipeg winning two series. In 1985, the Jets defeated the Flames 3–1 for their first playoff series victory. In the next playoffs, the Flames got swept the Jets in three straight games capped off by Lanny McDonald's overtime winner in the deciding game beginning Calgary's run to the Stanley Cup Final. In 1987, the Jets upset the Flames in six games in the opening round in what would turn out to be their final playoff series victory for the franchise until 2012, when they were known as the Phoenix Coyotes. This was also the last time a Winnipeg-based NHL team won a playoff series until 2018 when the modern Winnipeg Jets won the first round series in five games.

The rivalry is based on the tradition used by their set of fans. Both the original and later the modern created the Winnipeg Whiteout by wearing white to home playoff games in Winnipeg, and the "C of Red" is used by Calgary Flames fans by wearing a red jersey with Calgary's flaming C on it.

From 1980 (when the Flames moved to Calgary) to 1996 (when the original Jets moved to Arizona), Calgary won the all-time regular season record, 51–38–16–0, while Winnipeg won the all-time playoff record, 7–6.

=== Chicago Blackhawks vs. Detroit Red Wings (1926–2013; 2020–21) ===
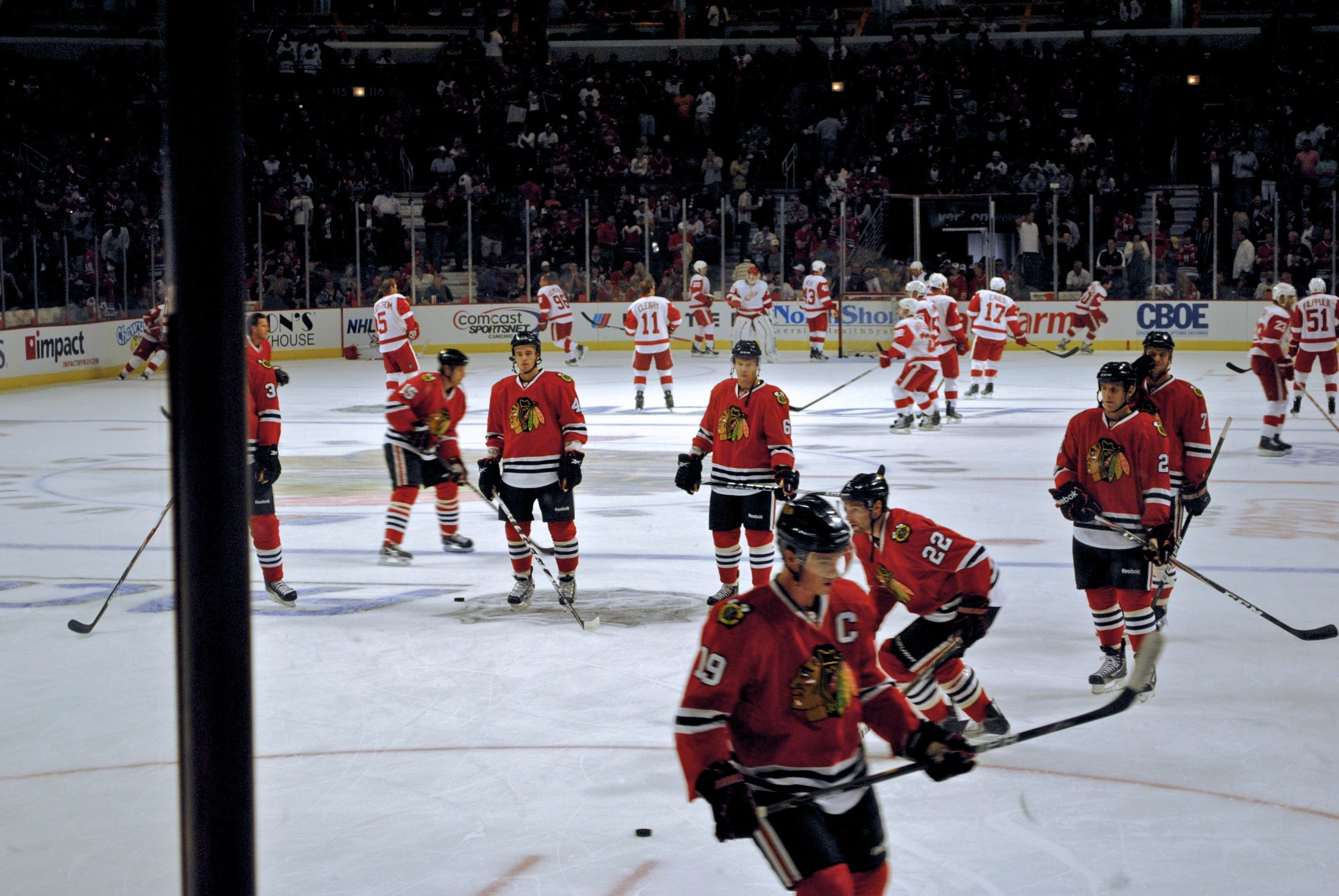
The Blackhawks and Red Wings warming up prior to a game in October 2010

The Blackhawks–Red Wings rivalry primarily occurred in the Central Division prior to the 2013–14 NHL realignment. It primarily existed between 1926–27, when it went through the Original Six days (during which they were the league's only teams in the Midwest), to 2012–13. These two clubs have faced each other in more regular season games than any other two clubs in NHL history, except the Bruins and Canadiens, which exceeds them in total games played when Stanley Cup playoff games are included.

Before the 2013–14 season, the Detroit Red Wings moved from the Central Division of the Western Conference to the newly formed Atlantic Division of the Eastern Conference, while Chicago stayed in the Central Division. This effectively caused the rivalry to cease (despite the two cities' proximity to each other), as the Blackhawks and Red Wings now meet only twice a year; the one exception was the 2020–21 season, in which the Red Wings were moved back to the Central on an interim basis. However, the rich history between the two teams remains very popular today, and some even consider the rivalry to still be in existence deep down, despite them now being in different conferences.

As of the end of the 2025–26 season, Detroit leads the regular season record, 378–278–84–17, while Chicago leads the playoff record, 43–38.

=== Chicago Blackhawks vs. Los Angeles Kings (2012–2018) ===
Originally both meeting during the 1974 playoffs (culminating in a five-game Blackhawks' series victory), a brief playoff rivalry had erupted between the two teams as they often locked horns into a fierce playoff battle culminating in five Stanley Cup wins from either of two teams from 2010 to 2015. The rivalry reached its high point on January 19, 2013, when the Blackhawks spoiled the Kings' Stanley Cup party. Furthermore, it caught fire when both teams met in back-to-back Western Conference championship matchups with either side winning a series; the Blackhawks during the 2013 Western Conference finals, and the Kings during the 2014 Western Conference finals. During the 2013 matchup, both sides spent a cumulative 74 minutes in the penalty box as a direct result from the fierce competition between both sides, most notably between Blackhawks' Star Right Winger Patrick Kane and Kings' Defenseman Drew Doughty. The 2014 conference finals saw the Kings return with vengeance. The Kings held a 3–1 series lead, except Chicago came back to force a seventh game. In the subsequent overtime, Alec Martinez scored for Los Angeles to defeat the Blackhawks. Though the Blackhawks would manage another Stanley Cup victory in 2015, both teams regressed massively after 2018 due to rebuilds and neither team being competitive at the same time.

As of the end of the 2025–26 season, Chicago leads the regular season record, 100–86–17–12, and the playoff record, 11–6, against Los Angeles.

=== Chicago Blackhawks vs. Minnesota North Stars (1981–1993) ===
The North Stars and the Blackhawks played each other in the playoffs six times from 1982 through 1991 in 1982, 1983, 1984, 1985, 1990 and 1991. The rivalry was at its most fierce from the 1981–82 through 1984–85 seasons, when the teams played in four straight playoff series, with the Blackhawks winning three out of the four. In 1991, the Blackhawks had won the Presidents’ Trophy with 106 points and were among the favorites to win the Stanley Cup. However, despite Minnesota finishing with 68 points (38 behind Chicago) during the season, the North Stars upset the Presidents’ Trophy winning Blackhawks in the Norris Division semifinals in six games, beginning their Cinderella run to the Stanley Cup Final before losing to Pittsburgh Penguins, in six games. It was the 2nd largest upset in NHL history in terms of points. The Blackhawks got a small measure of revenge the next year, when they dethroned the North Stars as Campbell Conference Champions. Just like the North Stars the year before, the Blackhawks lost to Pittsburgh Penguins in the Stanley Cup Final. The rivalry died in 1993, when the North Stars moved to Dallas.

Before the North Stars moved to Dallas, Chicago won the all-time regular season record, 92–56–21–0, and the playoff record, 19–14, for a total of 111–70–21–0 against Minnesota.

=== Chicago Blackhawks vs. Vancouver Canucks (1974–2013) ===
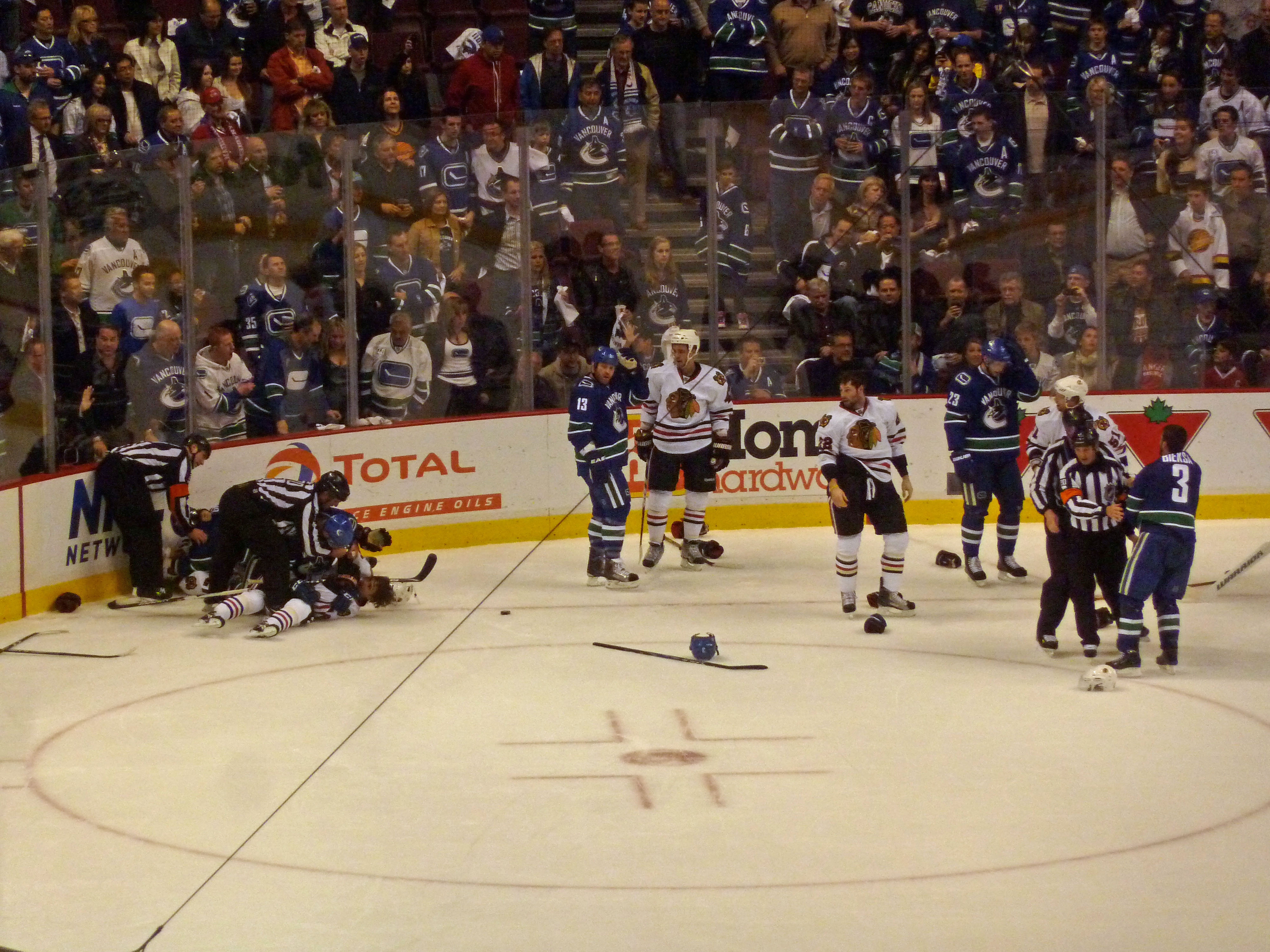
An altercation between the Blackhawks and Canucks during game 5 of the 2011 playoffs

For a period of five seasons between 2008–09 and 2012–13, this rivalry was considered one of the best in the NHL. This is mainly because there were three straight years of playoffs series between these teams in 2009, 2010, and 2011. The first seeds of the rivalry began with the realignment of the NHL in 1974, placing both teams in the newly formed Smythe Division. For two years, they battled each other for the top spot and in 1977, they went down to the wire for the last playoff spot, which Chicago won on a tiebreaker by virtue of having more wins at season's end.

The two teams met in the playoffs for the first time in the 1982 Campbell Conference finals, which is best remembered for a mock surrender by then-Canucks coach Roger Neilson over what he deemed questionable officiating in game 2, which began the Towel Power tradition in Vancouver and elsewhere in sports. Vancouver prevailed in the series four games to one, as part of their 1982 Stanley Cup run. The Blackhawks swept the Canucks in the 1995 Western Conference semifinals.

They did not meet again until the 2008–09 season. The Blackhawks eliminated the Canucks in the playoffs that season in the second round and defeated them again the following season in the same round as part of their 2010 Stanley Cup run. The rivalry reached its peak in the 2011 playoffs, as they met for the third straight year in the first round of the playoffs that year, where the Canucks finally defeated Chicago 4–3. In this series, the Canucks took a 3–0 series only to drop the next three games. In game 7, the Blackhawks tied it in the final minutes shorthanded, sending the game to overtime. In overtime, Canucks forward Alexandre Burrows scored on a slapshot to win the series for the Canucks, as part of their run to the 2011 Stanley Cup Final, in which they ultimately lost in seven games to the Boston Bruins. The rivalry has died down since then due to the subsequent decline of the Canucks in the 2010s following their appearance in the 2011 Stanley Cup Final, as well as a lack of playoff matches between the two teams.

As of the end of the 2025–26 season, Vancouver leads the regular season record, 97–84–22–7, while Chicago leads the playoff record, 16–12.

=== Colorado Avalanche vs. Detroit Red Wings (1995–2003) ===
During the 1996 Stanley Cup playoffs, Red Wings player Kris Draper was checked into the boards and severely injured by Avalanche player Claude Lemieux. Draper went to the hospital with a concussion and multiple broken bones in his face as a result, and he required surgery and stitches; he did not return to play until much later in the following season. This incident led to a series of on-ice confrontations during an Avalanche-Red Wings game on March 26, 1997, including a massive brawl near the end of the first period which featured Red Wings enforcer Darren McCarty (another member of the "Grind Line" and Draper's best friend) brutally beating up Lemieux as revenge for the incident with Draper, as well as a vicious goaltender fight between Patrick Roy and Mike Vernon. Both of these events were major reasons for the extremely sudden intensification of the Detroit-Colorado rivalry, which is regarded by many as one of the greatest and bloodiest rivalries in NHL history, and even all of sports.

The rivalry was largely predicated on the competitiveness of both teams in the late 1990s and early 2000s. From 1995–96 to 2001–02, the teams met in five playoff series, three times in the Western Conference finals. Out of those seven seasons, the teams combined to win five Stanley Cups and four Presidents' Trophies. From 1995 to 2003, both teams, along with the New Jersey Devils, reigned exclusively as Stanley Cup champions, except in 1999, which was won by the Dallas Stars (the Devils beat the Red Wings in 1995, while the Avalanche beat the Devils in 2001. The rivalry started to cool down after the 2002–03 season, with both teams falling in round one and Roy announcing his retirement shortly afterwards. The last playoff meeting between the two teams was in 2008, with the Red Wings sweeping the Avalanche 4–0 on the way to the Stanley Cup. The Red Wings joined the Eastern Conference in 2013 and the two former rivals now only meet twice a year. However, a stadium series game took place on February 27, 2016, between the two teams at Coors Field, which the Red Wings won 5–3, though the Avalanche came back in the alumni game the day before, winning the exhibition contest 5–3.

As of the end of the 2025–26 season, Detroit leads the regular season record, 48–33–1–10, while both teams are tied in the playoff record, 17–17.

=== Detroit Red Wings vs. St. Louis Blues (1981–2013) ===
The rivalry began when the Red Wings switched divisions for the 1981–82 season and developed in the late 1980s when they had intense division battles. In 1988, the Red Wings defeated the Blues in five games in the Norris division final. The rivalry really heated up in the 1990s. In 1991, the Blues defeated the Red Wings in seven games in the Norris division semifinals after overcoming a 3–1 series deficit. They met up in the playoffs three straight times between 1996 and 1998; the Red Wings won all three series. However, the Blues almost defeated the Red Wings in 1996. They held a 3–2 advantage and it looked like the Blues would upset the Wings in game 6, but the Wings won the last two games including a double overtime victory in game 7. This was also part of the 1997 and 1998 Stanley Cup runs. When the Divisions realigned in 1998, this was the most intense rivalry in the Central division as they had many division battles until the 2003–04 season. They met during the playoffs in 2002 in the conference semifinals. The Red Wings defeated the Blues in five games en route to their 2002 Stanley Cup run. The rivalry died down in the post-lockout era as the Blues entered a slump, only reviving as the teams fought for the Central Division title in the 2011–12 season. The Red Wings' move to the Eastern Conference in 2013 ended the rivalry for good.

As of the end of the 2025–26 season, St. Louis leads the regular season record, 129–119–37–11, while Detroit leads the playoff record, 24–16.

=== Detroit Red Wings vs. San Jose Sharks (1994–2013) ===
The rivalry between the Red Wings and the Sharks began in the 1994 Stanley Cup playoffs, in which the upstart Sharks upset the Red Wings 4–3 in their playoff debut. Game 7 saw Sharks forward Jamie Baker score the series-winning goal on the road. After the Red Wings returned the favor by sweeping them in the second round of the 1995 playoffs, the rivalry further intensified after the Red Wings acquired Russian defenseman Igor Larionov in a trade with the Sharks, eventually forming the Russian Five core that resulted in them winning back-to-back Stanley Cups in 1997 and 1998. Both teams also faced each other in three playoff series between 2007 and 2011, with the Sharks winning two series. The 2011 meeting saw the Red Wings nearly overcome a 3–0 deficit only to lose in game 7. However, the rivalry ended in 2013 after the Red Wings moved to the Eastern Conference.

As of the end of the 2025–26 season, Detroit leads the regular season record, 63–31–4–8, and the playoff record, 15–14, against San Jose.

=== Edmonton Oilers vs. Winnipeg Jets (original) (1972–1996) ===
The Oilers and the original Jets both started their existence in the World Hockey Association in 1972. There, the Jets dominated the Oilers winning the Avco Cup three times, while the Oilers were not playoff contenders. But, when they joined the NHL in 1979 (along with the Quebec Nordiques and Hartford Whalers), the tables were turned, thanks to an 18-year-old from Brantford, Ontario named Wayne Gretzky. From 1983 to 1988, the Oilers and Jets met in the playoffs five times, the Oilers won every one of them, losing only one game out of the 19 games played between the two on their way to the Stanley Cup Final appearances in the 1980s. Gretzky had been traded to the Los Angeles Kings by the time the two teams met in the first round of the 1990 playoffs. The Jets took a commanding 3–1 series lead and led game five by that same margin. Eventually, the Oilers fought back to win the next three games and the series in seven. The Oilers would lose just three more games the remainder of the playoffs, en route to their fifth Stanley Cup championship in seven years. The rivalry ended in 1996 when the original Jets left Winnipeg to become the Phoenix Coyotes.

Before the Jets moved to Arizona, Edmonton won the regular season record, 64–39–8–0, and the playoff record, 22–4, for a total of 86–43–8–0 against Winnipeg.

=== Montreal Canadiens vs. Montreal Maroons (1924–1938) ===
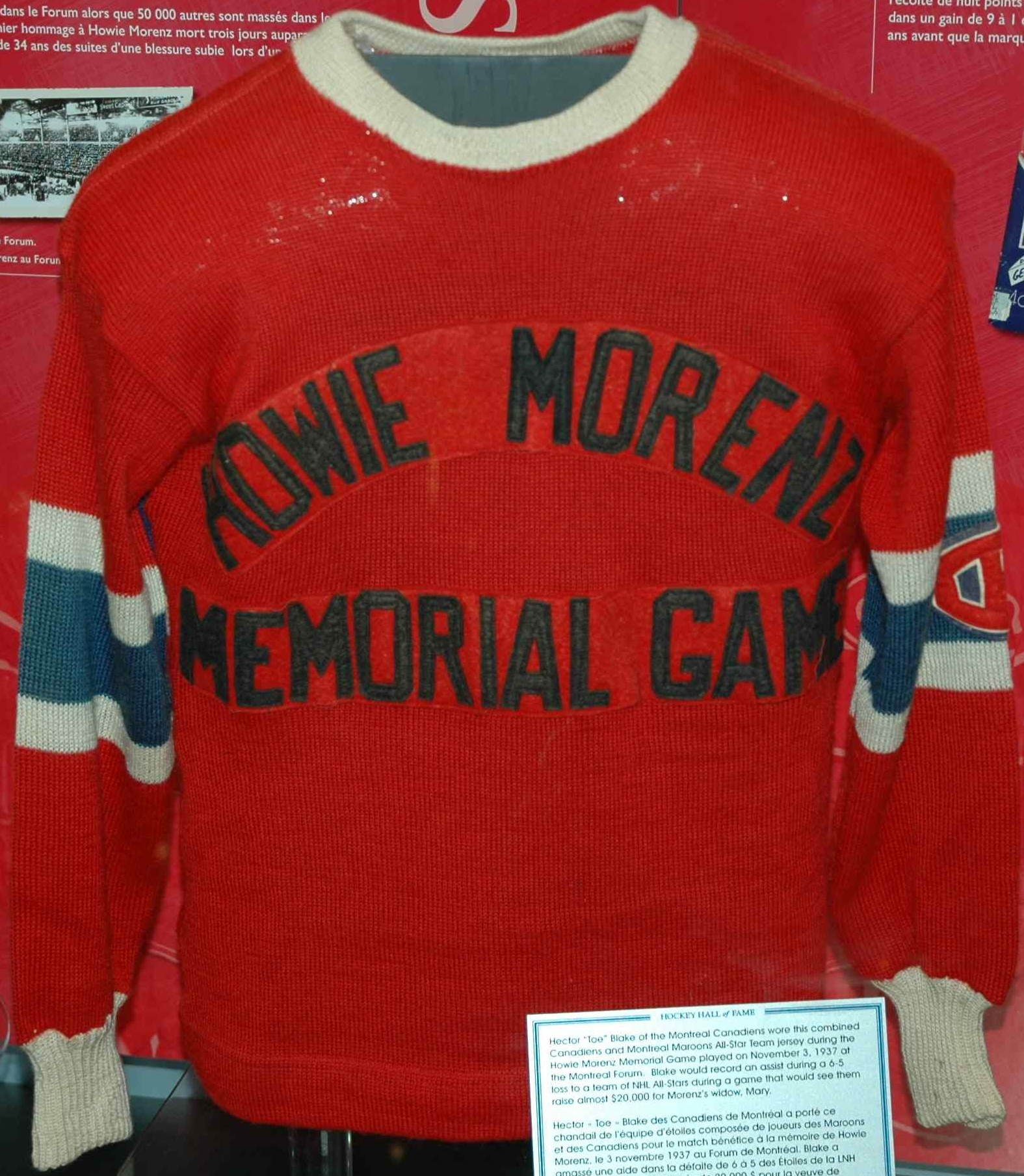
Sweater worn by the Montreal All-Stars at the Howie Morenz Memorial Game in 1937. Players for the Montreal All-Stars were drawn from the two Montreal-based clubs, the Maroons and Canadiens.

The Canadiens and Montreal Maroons had a rivalry that existed between 1924 and 1938. Since 1918 no other team had been occupied in Montreal. The Montreal Wanderers had played for only six games before the arena they (and the Canadiens) played in, the Montreal Arena, burnt down. The Maroons were meant to appeal to the English-speaking people of Quebec, while the Canadiens were meant to appeal to French Canadians. The two teams met in the playoffs for the first time in 1927 for a two-game total goals series. The final game had 11,000 fans packed in an arena meant for 10,000 as the Canadiens defeated the Maroons. The next year the Maroons would have their revenge as they defeated the Canadiens 3–2 in total goals. This was their last playoff meeting before the Maroons eventually folded in 1938.

Before the Maroons were dissolved, the Canadiens won the regular season record, 40–35–17–0, while both teams were tied in the playoff record, 1–1–2.

== See also ==
- Major League Baseball rivalries
- Major League Soccer rivalries
- National Basketball Association rivalries
- National Football League rivalries
