= Good Friday Massacre =

Altercations during the 1984 Stanley Cup playoffs

	1	2	3	Total
Quebec Nordiques	1	0	2	3
Montreal Canadiens	0	0	5	5
- Date: April 20, 1984
- Arena: Montreal Forum
- City: Montreal
- Attendance: 18,090

In ice hockey, the Good Friday Massacre (French: la bataille du Vendredi Saint) was a second-round playoff match-up during the 1984 Stanley Cup playoffs. The game occurred on Good Friday, April 20, 1984, in Montreal, Quebec, Canada, between the Quebec Nordiques and the Montreal Canadiens. It is notable less for its series-ending finish than its epic brawl between the players, which spanned multiple periods and resulted in 11 ejections and 252 penalty minutes. It was the most infamous episode of the Battle of Quebec.

== Background ==
The Montreal Canadiens, five years removed from their dynasty of the 1970s, had regressed in the five years since their most recent championship in 1979. After being eliminated in the second round of the 1980 playoffs by the Minnesota North Stars, the Canadiens did not win another playoff series for the next three years. In 1981, the Canadiens suffered an embarrassing three-game sweep against the Edmonton Oilers to become the first NHL team to lose a playoff series to a former World Hockey Association team. The next year, their new provincial rivals from the WHA stunned the Canadiens by winning the fifth and deciding game in the first playoff series between the two provincial rivals, while 1983 brought another first-round sweep for Montreal at the hands of the Buffalo Sabres.

The Quebec Nordiques, meanwhile, had steadily improved in the five years since joining the NHL as part of the NHL–WHA merger. Quebec reached the playoffs in only their second NHL season, and after that, did not post a losing season until 1987. Although they narrowly failed to get past the powerful Philadelphia Flyers in their first NHL playoff series, the following year saw the aforementioned upset against Montreal, followed by another upset against the Boston Bruins. After being swept by the New York Islanders, who were then in the middle of their own championship dynasty, the Nordiques met the Bruins once again the following year, this time losing 3–1 in the first round.

The Canadiens regressed further in 1984, playing around .500 hockey (wins equal to losses) for most of the season. Replacing coach Bob Berry with the defensively-minded Jacques Lemaire did not initially improve the club's fortunes, and the team ended up losing its last six regular-season games to finish with its first losing record in the expansion era. However, under the relatively easy playoff format of the time, it was still good enough to qualify since the Canadiens finished 11 points ahead of the last place Hartford Whalers. Quebec, meanwhile, finished with its best NHL record to that point in its history, although its 94 points were still only good enough for third place behind the Bruins and Sabres. However, both Quebec teams stunned their first-round opposition with three-game sweeps, setting up an unexpected rematch between them for the second round.

The provincial rivals split the first two games in Quebec as well as the next two in Montreal. The Canadiens shut out the Nordiques 4–0 at the Colisée de Québec to give themselves the chance to eliminate the Nordiques at the Forum.

== Game play ==
After several fights, a bench-clearing brawl broke out as the siren sounded to end the second period. Amongst the fourteen altercations at the end of the second period were the Canadiens' Mario Tremblay smashing the nose of the Nordiques' Peter Stastny, and Nordiques' Louis Sleigher knocking Canadiens' Jean Hamel unconscious by sucker-punching him in the eye. Bruce Hood, the referee for the game, sent the teams off the ice without officially ending the second period by assigning penalties for the brawl.

After the intermission, with all players from both teams on the ice to warm up for the third period, a second brawl broke out. The public address announcer started reading the penalty summary as the players warmed up, and as players heard the confirmation that they were to be ejected from the game anyway, some felt they "might as well take some guys with (them)" (per Larry Robinson), as "they had nothing to lose" (per Guy Carbonneau). In particular, the Canadiens players went after the Nordiques' Louis Sleigher, furious with him for the damage he had inflicted on Jean Hamel in the original brawl. The second brawl included a fight between brothers Dale Hunter (Nordiques) and Mark Hunter (Canadiens).

The officials had to be summoned to the ice to restore order; Bruce Hood was roundly criticized for his handling of the situation. Hood had failed to "complete" the second period by informing the time keeper, the PA announcer, and the head coaches as to what penalties had been assigned, including which players (including Sleigher) had been ejected from the game and should not return to the ice for the third period. Hood retired after the playoffs that year, doing so amidst speculation that his retirement occurred at the behest of the NHL.

A total of 252 penalty minutes were incurred, and 11 players were (belatedly) ejected. Hamel managed to return for training camp in the autumn of 1984, but sustained another eye injury in Montreal's October 4 pre-season game, prompting him to retire.

== Aftermath ==
When the brawl took place, the Canadiens were trailing 1–0. After surrendering one more goal to Quebec just over two minutes into the third period, Montreal scored five consecutive goals, eventually defeating the Nordiques 5–3, thereby winning the series 4 games to 2. However, the Canadiens were defeated in the Prince of Wales Conference finals by the New York Islanders in six games.

== Game summary ==
April 20, 1984	Quebec Nordiques	3–5	Montreal Canadiens	Montreal Forum	Recap

Scoring summary
Period	Team	Goal	Assist(s)	Time	Score
1st	QUE	Peter Stastny (2) – pp	Jean-Francois Sauve (1) and Anton Stastny (4)	05:12	1–0 QUE
2nd	None				
3rd	QUE	Michel Goulet (2) – pp	Unassisted	02:02	2–0 QUE
3rd	MTL	Steve Shutt (3)	Bobby Smith (2) and Pierre Mondou (2)	06:23	2–1 QUE
3rd	MTL	Steve Shutt (4)	Mats Naslund (6)	09:11	2–2
3rd	MTL	Rick Green (1)	Bobby Smith (3)	12:14	3–2 MTL
3rd	MTL	John Chabot (1)	Guy Lafleur (2) and Mats Naslund (2)	13:27	4–2 MTL
3rd	MTL	Guy Carbonneau (3)	Ryan Walter (2)	14:28	5–2 MTL
3rd	QUE	Wilf Paiement (3)	Jean-Francois Sauve (2), Alain Cote (2)	16:51	5–3 MTL

Number in parentheses represents the player's total in goals or assists to that point of the playoffs

Penalty summary
Period	Team	Player	Penalty	Time	PIM
1st	QUE	Wilf Paiement	Fighting – major	00:23	5:00
1st	MTL	Mike McPhee	Fighting – major	00:23	5:00
1st	QUE	Michel Goulet	Holding	02:48	2:00
1st	MTL	Bobby Smith	Slashing	02:48	2:00
1st	MTL	Craig Ludwig	Tripping	04:18	2:00
1st	MTL	Jean Hamel	Illegal equipment	05:01	2:00
1st	QUE	Wally Weir	Charging	09:51	2:00
1st	QUE	Blake Wesley	Holding	11:52	2:00
1st	QUE	Pat Price	Slashing	17:23	2:00
1st	MTL	Chris Nilan	Elbowing	17:23	2:00
1st	QUE	Mario Marois	Slashing	20:00	2:00
2nd	QUE	Michel Goulet	Holding	03:52	2:00
2nd	MTL	Chris Chelios	Roughing	15:20	2:00
2nd	QUE	Dale Hunter	Roughing	15:20	2:00
2nd	MTL	Rick Green	Roughing	17:39	2:00
2nd	QUE	Dale Hunter	Roughing	17:39	2:00
2nd	QUE	Anton Stastny	Fighting – major	17:59	5:00
2nd	MTL	Craig Ludwig	Fighting – major	17:59	5:00
2nd	QUE	Andre Dore	Interference	19:44	2:00
2nd	MTL	Bobby Smith	Interference	19:48	2:00
2nd	MTL	Guy Carbonneau	Roughing	20:00	2:00
2nd	MTL	Mark Hunter	Fighting – major	20:00	5:00
2nd	MTL	Mark Hunter	Game misconduct	20:00	10:00
2nd	MTL	Mike McPhee	Fighting – major	20:00	5:00
2nd	MTL	Mike McPhee	Game misconduct	20:00	10:00
2nd	MTL	Chris Nilan	Fighting – double major	20:00	10:00
2nd	MTL	Chris Nilan	Misconduct	20:00	10:00
2nd	MTL	Chris Nilan	Game misconduct	20:00	10:00
2nd	MTL	Jean Hamel	Roughing	20:00	2:00
2nd	MTL	Mario Tremblay	Fighting – major	20:00	5:00
2nd	MTL	Mario Tremblay	Game misconduct	20:00	10:00
2nd	MTL	Richard Sevigny	Fighting – major	20:00	5:00
2nd	MTL	Richard Sevigny	Game misconduct	20:00	10:00
2nd	QUE	Dale Hunter	Roughing – double minor	20:00	4:00
2nd	QUE	Dale Hunter	Fighting – major	20:00	5:00
2nd	QUE	Dale Hunter	Game misconduct	20:00	10:00
2nd	QUE	Randy Moller	Fighting – major	20:00	5:00
2nd	QUE	Randy Moller	Double misconduct	20:00	20:00
2nd	QUE	Peter Stastny	Fighting – major	20:00	5:00
2nd	QUE	Peter Stastny	Game misconduct	20:00	10:00
2nd	QUE	Louis Sleigher	Fighting – major	20:00	5:00
2nd	QUE	Louis Sleigher	Game misconduct	20:00	10:00
2nd	QUE	Wally Weir	Fighting – major	20:00	5:00
2nd	QUE	Wally Weir	Game misconduct	20:00	10:00
2nd	QUE	Clint Malarchuk	Fighting – major	20:00	5:00
2nd	QUE	Clint Malarchuk	Game misconduct	20:00	10:00
3rd	QUE	Michel Goulet	Tripping	06:46	2:00

Shots
Period	1st	2nd	3rd	Total
Quebec	8	9	7	24
Montreal	11	8	7	26

Power play opportunities
Team	Goals/Opportunities
Quebec	1/5
Montreal	0/6

Three star selections
	Team	Player	Statistics
1st	MTL	Steve Shutt	2 Goals
2nd	MTL	Mats Naslund	1 Assist
3rd	MTL	Chris Chelios	

== Broadcast ==
It was broadcast on CBC Television and Télévision de Radio-Canada in Canada, and on the USA Network in the United States.

Channel	Play-by-play	Color commentators
CBC	Bob Cole	Mickey Redmond; Dick Irvin Jr. (first 2 periods); Don Cherry (3rd period)
Radio-Canada	René Lecavalier	Gilles Tremblay
USA	Al Albert	Gary Green
