= Idaho's 32nd legislative district =

American legislative district

- A map of the 32nd legislative district
Senator
Kevin Cook; R–Idaho Falls
since 2022
Representative
Stephanie Mickelsen; R–Idaho Falls
since 2022
Erin Bingham; R–Idaho Falls
since 2022
- Demographics: 83.30% White; 0.40% Black; 13.84% Hispanic; 0.86% Native American; 6.66% Other
- Population (2020): 50,982
- Registered voters (2025): 26,605

Idaho's 32nd legislative district is one of 35 districts of the Idaho Legislature. It currently comprises the area of Bonneville County surrounding the city of Idaho Falls and extending to the western boundary of the county (most of Idaho Falls itself being in district 33).

It is currently represented by State Senator Kevin Cook, Republican of Idaho Falls, Representative Stephanie Mickelsen, Republican of Bonneville County, and Erin Bingham, Republican of Ammon.

== District profile ==
=== 2022–present ===
Since Idaho's redistricting in 2021, District 32 consists of the area of Bonneville County surrounding the city of Idaho Falls and extending to the western boundary of the county. Most of Idaho Falls itself is in District 33, which is entirely within District 32.

Legislature	Session	Senate	House Seat A	House Seat B
67th (2022 - 2024)	1st	Kevin Cook (R)	Stephanie Mickelsen (R)	Erin Bingham (R)
67th (2022 - 2024)	2nd	Kevin Cook (R)	Stephanie Mickelsen (R)	Erin Bingham (R)
68th (2024 - 2026)	1st	Kevin Cook (R)	Stephanie Mickelsen (R)	Erin Bingham (R)
68th (2024 - 2026)	2nd	Kevin Cook (R)	Stephanie Mickelsen (R)	Erin Bingham (R)

=== 2012–2022 ===
From 2012 to 2022, District 32 consisted of all of Bear Lake, Caribou, Franklin, Oneida, and Teton Counties and a portion of Bonneville County.

Legislature	Session	Senate	House Seat A	House Seat B
62nd (2012 - 2014)	1st	John Tippets (R)	Marc Gibbs (R)	Thomas Loertscher (R)
62nd (2012 - 2014)	2nd	John Tippets (R)	Marc Gibbs (R)	Thomas Loertscher (R)
63rd (2014 - 2016)	1st	John Tippets (R)	Marc Gibbs (R)	Thomas Loertscher (R)
63rd (2014 - 2016)	2nd	Mark Harris (R)	Marc Gibbs (R)	Thomas Loertscher (R)
64th (2016 - 2018)	1st	Mark Harris (R)	Marc Gibbs (R)	Thomas Loertscher (R)
64th (2016 - 2018)	2nd	Mark Harris (R)	Marc Gibbs (R)	Thomas Loertscher (R)
65th (2018 - 2020)	1st	Mark Harris (R)	Marc Gibbs (R)	Chad Christensen (R)
65th (2018 - 2020)	2nd	Mark Harris (R)	Marc Gibbs (R)	Chad Christensen (R)
66th (2020 - 2022)	1st	Mark Harris (R)	Marc Gibbs (R)	Chad Christensen (R)
66th (2020 - 2022)	2nd	Mark Harris (R)	Marc Gibbs (R)	Chad Christensen (R)

=== 2002–2012 ===
From 2002 to 2012, District 32 consisted of a portion of Bonneville County.

Legislature	Session	Senate	House Seat A	House Seat B
57th (2002 - 2004)	1st	Mel Richardson (R)	Janice McGeachin (R)	Ann Rydalch (R)
57th (2002 - 2004)	2nd	Mel Richardson (R)	Janice McGeachin (R)	Ann Rydalch (R)
58th (2004 - 2006)	1st	Mel Richardson (R)	Janice McGeachin (R)	Ann Rydalch (R)
58th (2004 - 2006)	2nd	Mel Richardson (R)	Janice McGeachin (R)	Ann Rydalch (R)
59th (2006 - 2008)	1st	Mel Richardson (R)	Janice McGeachin (R)	Dean Mortimer (R)
59th (2006 - 2008)	2nd	Mel Richardson (R)	Janice McGeachin (R)	Dean Mortimer (R)
60th (2008 - 2010)	1st	Dean Mortimer (R)	Janice McGeachin (R)	Erik Simpson (R)
60th (2008 - 2010)	2nd	Dean Mortimer (R)	Janice McGeachin (R)	Erik Simpson (R)
61st (2010 - 2012)	1st	Dean Mortimer (R)	Janice McGeachin (R)	Erik Simpson (R)
61st (2010 - 2012)	2nd	Dean Mortimer (R)	Janice McGeachin (R)	Erik Simpson (R)

=== 1992–2002 ===
From 1992 to 2002, District 32 consisted of all of Bear Lake, Caribou, Franklin, and Oneida counties and a portion of Bannock County.

Legislature	Session	Senate	House Seat A	House Seat B
51st (1992 - 1994)	1st	Dennis Hansen (R)	Robert C. Geddes (R)	John Tippets (R)
51st (1992 - 1994)	2nd	Dennis Hansen (R)	Robert C. Geddes (R)	John Tippets (R)
52nd (1994 - 1996)	1st	Dennis Hansen (R)	Robert C. Geddes (R)	John Tippets (R)
52nd (1994 - 1996)	2nd	Robert L. Geddes (R)	Robert C. Geddes (R)	John Tippets (R)
53rd (1996 - 1998)	1st	Robert L. Geddes (R)	Robert C. Geddes (R)	John Tippets (R)
53rd (1996 - 1998)	2nd	Robert L. Geddes (R)	Robert C. Geddes (R)	John Tippets (R)
54th (1998 - 2000)	1st	Robert L. Geddes (R)	Robert C. Geddes (R)	John Tippets (R)
54th (1998 - 2000)	2nd	Robert L. Geddes (R)	Robert C. Geddes (R)	Clair Cheirrett (R)
55th (2000 - 2002)	1st	Robert L. Geddes (R)	Larry Bradford (R)	Eulalie Teichert Langford (R)
55th (2000 - 2002)	2nd	Robert L. Geddes (R)	Larry Bradford (R)	Eulalie Teichert Langford (R)

== See also ==
- List of Idaho senators
- List of Idaho representatives
