= Robert Geddes =

Robert or Bob Geddes may refer to:

- Robert L. Geddes (born 1955), Idaho politician
- Bobby Geddes (born 1960), Scottish footballer
- Bob Geddes, character in The Human Jungle (film)
- Bob Geddes, American football player, see Jets–Patriots rivalry
- Robert Geddes (architect) (1923–2023), American architect, dean of the Princeton University School of Architecture (1965–1982)
