= Senator Geddes =

Senator Geddes may refer to:

- George Geddes (engineer) (1809–1883), New York State Senate
- John Geddes (politician) (1777–1828), South Carolina State Senate
- Robert L. Geddes (born 1955), Idaho State Senate

== See also ==
- William Geddis (1896–1971), Northern Irish Senate
