= Dean Mortimer =

American politician

Member of the Idaho Senate from the 30th district
- In office December 1, 2012 – December 1, 2020
- Preceded by: Edgar Malepeai
- Succeeded by: Kevin Cook

Member of the Idaho Senate from the 32nd district
- In office December 1, 2008 – December 1, 2012
- Preceded by: Mel Richardson
- Succeeded by: John Tippets

Member of the Idaho House of Representatives from 32nd district
- In office December 1, 2006 – December 1, 2008
- Preceded by: Ann Rydalch
- Succeeded by: Erik Simpson

Personal details
- Born: Moscow, Idaho, U.S.
- Party: Republican
- Spouse: Judy
- Children: 4
- Education: Ricks College (AA); Utah State University (BA, MBA)

Dean M. Mortimer is an American politician who served as a Republican member of the Idaho Senate, where as represented the 30th district from 2012 to 2020 and served as chairman of the education committee. He previously represented District 32 in the Idaho Senate from 2008 to 2012. He was a member of the Idaho House of Representatives from 2006 to 2008, representing the District 32 Seat B.

== Early life and education ==
Mortimer was born in Moscow, Idaho, and raised in the southeast region of the state. He attended grade school in Ammon, Idaho and Ucon, Idaho, and junior high school and high school in Rigby, Idaho. He attended Ricks College in Rexburg, in the fall of 1969. He then completed a two-year religious mission for the Church of Jesus Christ of Latter-day Saints in France, returning to Ricks College in 1972. While attending Ricks College, he served as a student body officer for the 1973–74 school year. He was also honored as Man of the Year at Ricks College in 1973. Awarded an associate degree, Mortimer transferred to Utah State University in Logan, Utah, where he earned a bachelor's degree in speech and a master's degree in Business Administration.

== Career ==
=== Business ===
He started work in the mortgage banking industry in 1977 at the Utah Mortgage Corporation. He worked as a construction loan officer for Security Pacific Corporation and for American Savings and Loan Association. He served as vice president of development for the McNiel/Mehew Group in Salt Lake City, Utah. In 1983, he returned to settle in south-eastern Idaho and in 1985 established a mortgage company, First Financial Corporation. Mortimer has served on the Board of the Idaho State Mortgage Bankers Association and was its president from 1991 to 1992. Mortimer also has interests in residential and commercial development, having launched Comfort Construction in 1998 and Commerce Properties Investments LLC in 2002.

Mortimer participates in local, regional and statewide volunteer activities. He has served in the Boy Scouts of America for more than two decades, and as a scoutmaster for the 2005 National Jamboree. He has also been active in the Idaho Falls Chamber of Commerce since 1984.

=== Politics ===
He later returned to Ricks College/Brigham Young University–Idaho to serve on the Alumni Council Board and then as the Alumni Council President from 2000 to 2002.

In 2006, Mortimer was elected to the Idaho House of Representatives, serving for one term. He was then elected to the Idaho Senate.

==== Committees ====
- Senate Education (vice chair)
- Senate Finance
- Joint Legislative Oversight
- Joint Finance-Appropriations
- Joint Finance-Appropriations Committee
- Senate Education (vice chair)
- Senate Finance
- Senate Judiciary and Rules

== Personal life ==
He is married to Judy (née Woodbury). They have four children and seven grandchildren.
