= Kevin Cook (politician) =

American politician

Member of the Idaho Senate from the 32nd district
- Incumbent
- Assumed office December 1, 2020
- Preceded by: Dean Mortimer
- Constituency: 30th district (2020–2022); 32nd district (2022–present)

Personal details
- Born: Spanish Fork, Utah, U.S.
- Party: Republican
- Education: Weber State University (BS)

Kevin Cook is an American businessman, software engineer, and politician serving as a Republican member of the Idaho Senate from the 32nd district. He assumed office on December 1, 2020.

== Early life and education ==
Cook was born in Spanish Fork, Utah. He earned a Bachelor of Science degree in computer science from Weber State University.

== Career ==
Cook worked as a software engineer for the Idaho National Laboratory. He then operated his own software consulting business for 12 years. Cook was elected to the Idaho Senate in November 2020. He assumed office on December 1, 2020.
