= Celtics–Knicks rivalry =

National Basketball Association rivalry

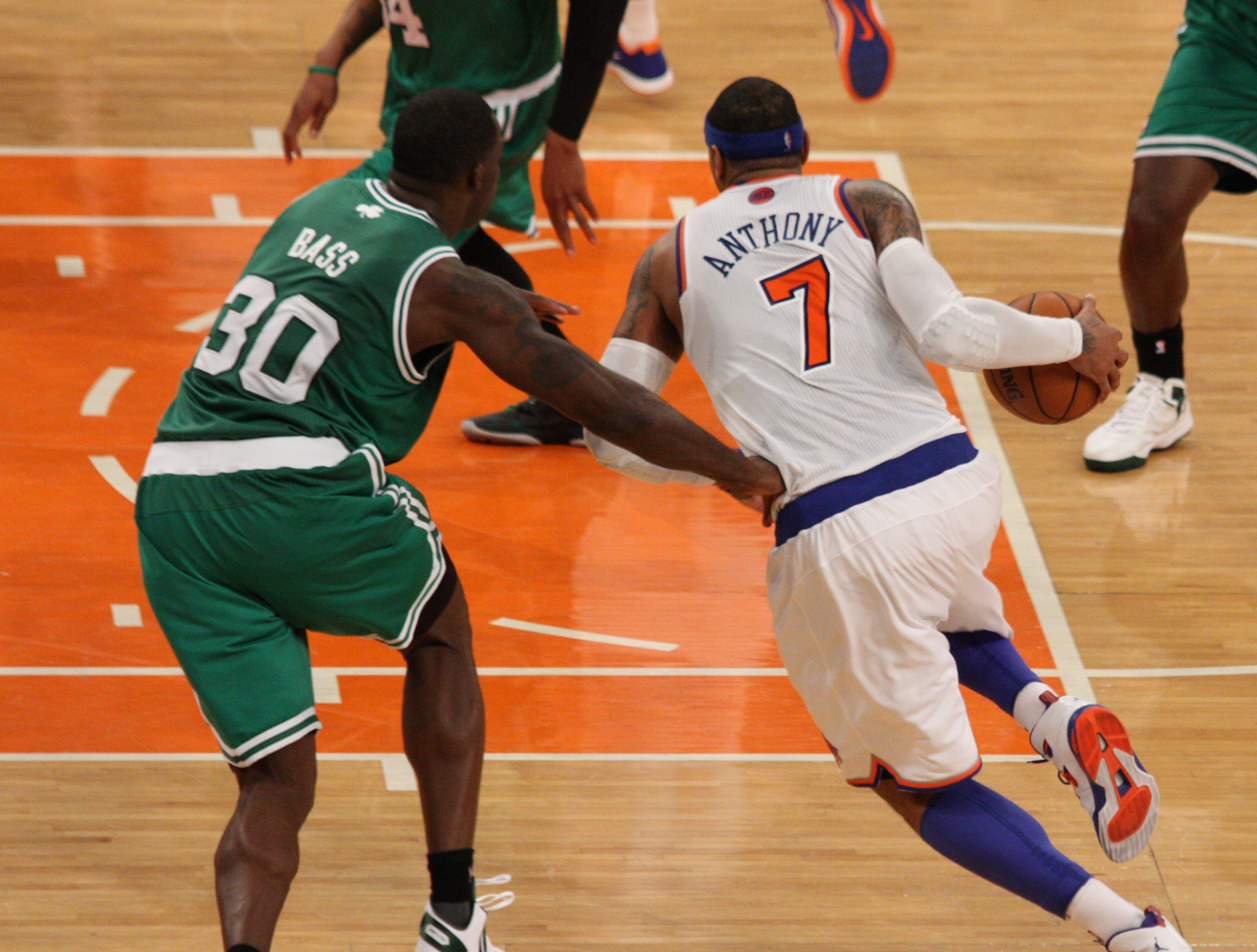
- Knicks' Carmelo Anthony (right) driving to the basket against Celtics' Brandon Bass (left) at Madison Square Garden during the 2013 Eastern Conference First Round

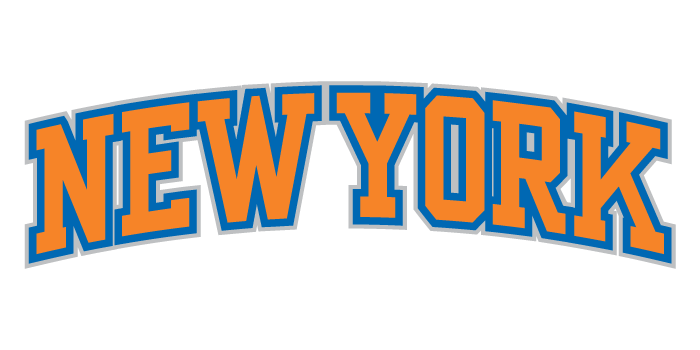
- Boston Celtics New York Knicks
- First meeting: December 7, 1946; Knicks 90, Celtics 65
- Latest meeting: October 23, 2026; Celtics 107, Knicks 103
- Next meeting: January 13, 2027

Statistics
- Total meetings: 576
- All-time series: 348–228 (BOS)
- Regular season series: 310–193 (BOS)
- Postseason results: 38–35 (BOS)
- Longest win streak: BOS W21; NYK W21
- Current win streak: BOS W1

Postseason history
- 1951 Eastern Division Semifinals: Knicks won, 2–0; 1952 Eastern Division Semifinals: Knicks won, 2–1; 1953 Eastern Division Finals: Knicks won, 3–1; 1954 Eastern Division Round Robin Semifinals: Celtics won, 2–0; 1955 Eastern Division Semifinals: Celtics won, 2–1; 1967 Eastern Division Semifinals: Celtics won, 3–1; 1969 Eastern Division Finals: Celtics won, 4–2; 1972 Eastern Conference Finals: Knicks won, 4–1; 1973 Eastern Conference Finals: Knicks won, 4–3; 1974 Eastern Conference Finals: Celtics won, 4–1; 1984 Eastern Conference Semifinals: Celtics won, 4–3; 1988 Eastern Conference First Round: Celtics won, 3–1; 1990 Eastern Conference First Round: Knicks won, 3–2; 2011 Eastern Conference First Round: Celtics won, 4–0; 2013 Eastern Conference First Round: Knicks won, 4–2; 2025 Eastern Conference Semifinals: Knicks won, 4–2

Locations of the Boston Celtics and New York Knicks.

The Celtics–Knicks rivalry is a National Basketball Association (NBA) rivalry between the Boston Celtics and the New York Knicks. The Celtics and Knicks are two of only three remaining charter franchises (the other being the Golden State Warriors) from the Basketball Association of America, which began operations in 1946. Of the three teams, only the Celtics and Knicks are still located in their original city.

The Celtics and Knicks were both established in 1946 as charter franchises of the Basketball Association of America, and are the two oldest teams still playing in their original city today. As a result, they have also played the most overall regular season games in history, with the Celtics playing nine more games (6,280 to 6,271) due to their invitation to the 2020 NBA Bubble. Their 503 regular season meetings are the most in NBA history.

Both the Celtics and Knicks compete in the Atlantic Division of the Eastern Conference, meaning they play each other four times each season, with two meetings in Boston, and two in New York.

== History ==
=== 1950s ===
The first playoff meeting was in the Division Semifinals of the 1950–51 season. This was the first round of the playoffs and a best-of-three series. The Knicks swept the Celtics and got to the NBA Finals, but lost to the Rochester Royals. The clubs squared off in the Division Semifinals once again in the following season. This time, the Celtics were able to win Game 1 at home, before the Knicks tied the series at home at 1. Game 3 was a tough, double overtime showdown in Boston, but the Knicks won 88–87. Once again, Knicks went to the finals and lost to the Lakers. In the 1952–53 season, the teams met in the Division Finals, a best-of-five series. The Knicks won Game 1, the Celtics won Game 2, each at home. The Knicks won Games 3 and 4 to win the series but lost to the Lakers in the Finals once again. Despite 3 Conference Championships with the help of future Hall of Famers Dick McGuire and Harry Gallatin, the Knicks never won an NBA title in the 1950s. For the 1953–54 season, the teams played in a round-robin format along with the Syracuse Nationals. This meant the 3 teams each played each other twice, and the one with the lowest winning % is eliminated. Syracuse went 4–0, Boston went 2–2, and New York went 0–4. Syracuse eliminated Boston in the following round. In the 1954–55 season, teams played each other in the Division Semifinals. The Celtics won Game 1 in Boston, the Knicks won Game 2 in New York, and the Celtics wrapped it up with a win in Game 3 but lost to the Nationals in the next round. It was the last playoff meeting until 1967. For the rest of the decade, the Knicks never advanced past the first round, while Boston won titles in the 1956–57, 1958–59, and 1959–60 seasons.

=== 1960s ===
The Celtics major success continued into the 1960s as they were champions every season from 1959 to 1966. They were led by Bob Cousy, Sam Jones, Frank Ramsey, Bill Russell, Satch Sanders, Tom Heinsohn, and K.C. Jones who all either had their number retired, or were inducted to the Hall of Fame. The Knicks' struggles continued by not qualifying for the playoffs from 1960 to 1966. When the Knicks finally made it back to the playoffs in the 1966–67 season, they met the Celtics in the Division Semifinals. The Celtics won the first two, but the Knicks fought back to win Game 3. The Celtics ended the series with a win in New York, but did not win an NBA title that season as they were defeated by the Philadelphia 76ers in the next round. Boston won another title in 1968. In the 1968–69 season, the teams squared off in the Division Finals. Boston won the first two, but the Knicks won Game 3. Boston won Game 4 by one, then the Knicks won Game 5, but the Celtics won the series with another 1 point win en route to winning another NBA title.

=== 1970s ===
In the 1971–72 season, the two teams met in the Conference Finals. The Knicks won the first two games, the Celtics won game 3, but the Knicks eliminated them with wins in Games 4 and 5. The Knicks went to the finals again but lost to the Lakers. In the 1972–73 season, the Knicks picked up Earl Monroe, who helped them go on another championship run. They beat Earl's old team, the Baltimore Bullets in round one, and met the Celtics in the Eastern Conference Finals. Boston won Game 1 at home, but the Knicks won the next three (Game 4 in 2OT). Boston fought back to tie the series at 3, but the Knicks routed them in Game 7 and went on to win their second NBA title. The teams met in the Conference Finals for the 3rd year in a row in the 1973–74 season. Boston won the series 4–1 and would go on to win their 12th NBA title. The Knicks era of greatness ended with the retirements of Reed and Frazier, and they went back to their old, familiar struggles. In the 1975–76 season, Dave Cowens, Jo Jo White, and the Celtics won another title.

=== 1980s ===
The Knicks had minimal playoff success in the early to mid 1980s, despite Bernard King's great seasons in that time. In contrast, Larry Bird led Boston to titles in the 1980–81, 1983–84, and 1985–86 seasons. In 1984, they met in the Eastern Conference Semifinals. It was a hotly contested series that ended with a Boston win at home in Game 7 (the home team won every game) en route to the Celtics' title victory over the Lakers. In the 1987–88 season, they met in the first round of the playoffs. Boston won the first two at home, but the Knicks won Game 3, but Boston won Game 4 and the series. They made it to the Conference Finals but got eliminated by the Detroit Pistons.

=== 1990s ===
The Celtics and Knicks met again in the first round of the 1990 NBA playoffs, which the Knicks won 3–2. The two teams would not meet in the playoffs again until 2011. The 1991–92 season was the last season that the Celtics would reach the second round in the 1990s, while the Knicks made it to the second round or farther every year from 1992 to 2000. Under the leadership of Patrick Ewing and Anthony Mason, the Knicks experienced plenty of success including Eastern Conference titles in 1994 and 1999. However, they failed to win an NBA title. During this time, the Knicks' rivals included the Michael Jordan-led Chicago Bulls, as well as the Miami Heat and Indiana Pacers, all of whom faced the Knicks in multiple memorable playoff series during this time. After the 1999–2000 season, Ewing was traded to the Seattle SuperSonics. The Knicks descended into irrelevance and did not win a playoff series again until 2013.

=== 2000s ===
The Knicks had a major collapse after the end of the Ewing era as they did not win a single playoff game from 2001 to 2012. The Celtics went into a new era under the leadership of Paul Pierce, who became team captain in 2003 and brought them back to the playoffs. In 2006, they drafted Rajon Rondo and in 2007, they acquired Kevin Garnett and Ray Allen, who (along with Pierce) formed their "Big Three." The trio helped the Celtics win their 17th NBA title in the 2007–08 season.

=== 2010s ===
In the summer of 2010, the New York Knicks signed Amar'e Stoudemire, formerly of the Phoenix Suns, who subsequently began rebuilding the team. Stoudemire averaged over 27 PPG in the 2010–11 season to help the Knicks clinch their first winning season since 2001. On February 21, 2011, the Knicks engaged in a high-profile trade with the Denver Nuggets to acquire superstar Carmelo Anthony. Those moves helped secure the Knicks' first playoff berth since 2004, where they were immediately swept by the Celtics. However, the Celtics would lose to the Miami Heat.

The 2012–13 season saw the Knicks flourish under the leadership of Anthony and offseason acquisition Tyson Chandler. Anthony won the 2013 scoring title and helped them win the Atlantic Division for the first time since 1994. On January 7, 2013, the two teams played in New York. With nine minutes remaining in the fourth quarter, a fight broke out on the court, triggered by animosity between Anthony and Boston's Kevin Garnett. After the fight was broken up, words continued to be exchanged, and after the game Carmelo attempted to go after Garnett in the locker rooms. This led to Carmelo being suspended for one game. Carmelo served his suspension on January 10 when the Knicks faced the Pacers. A rep for the league released a statement, saying, "There are no circumstances in which it is acceptable to confront an opponent after a game." Both teams met again in the first round of the 2013 NBA playoffs. The Celtics, who had lost Rajon Rondo to a mid-season injury, led the first two games going into halftime but were held to 25 and 23 points respectively in the second half to fall to 0–2. With the series shifting to Boston, the Knicks won Game 3, but Boston avoided elimination by winning Game 4 in Boston and Game 5 in New York. Game 6, played in Boston, featured the Knicks leading by 26 in the fourth quarter. The Celtics went on a 20–0 run in less than five minutes to make it a close game, but the Knicks held on to win their first playoff series since 2000. In the next round, the Knicks were beaten by the Indiana Pacers in 6 games.

=== 2020s ===
The Celtics and Knicks have appeared in the playoffs in the same season in 2021, with the Celtics needing to win a play-in tournament game. This also happened again in 2023. In 2024, the two teams came short of their first conference finals meeting since 1974, with the Knicks falling to the Indiana Pacers in seven games, while the Celtics eventually defeated the Dallas Mavericks for their first NBA title since 2008 and their record 18th title.

In 2025, they faced each other in the postseason for the first time since 2013. The Knicks defeated the Celtics in overtime, winning Game 1 108–105 after overcoming a 75-55 deficit, sealing the win with a Mikal Bridges steal. In Game 2, the Celtics possessed a 73-53 third-quarter lead, only to once again surrender a 20-point lead, leading to a 91-90 Knicks win in Boston, sealed by Mikal Bridges knocking away what would have been a Jayson Tatum game-winning shot. The Celtics also became the first team in the play-by-play era (dating back to the 1996-97 season) to blow 20-point deficits in consecutive games.

Facing a 2-0 deficit, the Celtics responded by defeating the Knicks 115–93 on the road. Prior to the Knicks taking a commanding 3–1 lead (having won 121–113), Jayson Tatum tore his Achilles tendon in the closing minutes of the game, having scored 42 points in a duel with Jalen Brunson, who had 39 points. Facing elimination returning to Boston, the Celtics responded with a resounding 127-102 win in Game 5. Returning to Madison Square Garden in Game 6, the Knicks eliminated the Celtics with a dominant 119–81 win, advancing to their first Conference Finals since 2000.

The Knicks not only clinched a playoff series win at home since 1999, but also denied a rematch of last year's Eastern Conference Finals between the Celtics and Indiana Pacers, where the Celtics swept them 4-0 en route to their 2024 championship. In the 2025 Eastern Conference Finals, the Knicks lost to the Pacers in six games. The Pacers would advance to the NBA Finals, but would lose in 7 games to the Oklahoma City Thunder following a Tyrese Haliburton achilles injury in the first quarter of Game 7.

In 2026, a potential second-round rematch was denied when the Celtics blew a 3–1 series lead over the 7th-seeded Philadelphia 76ers in a stunning upset. The Knicks, meanwhile, clinched all four playoff series on the road and won their first NBA championship since 1973.

== Season-by-season results ==
Boston Celtics vs. New York Knicks Season-by-Season Results
1940s (Knicks 17–9)

Season	Season series		at Boston Celtics	at New York Knicks	Overall series	Notes
1946–47	Celtics	4–2	Celtics, 2–1	Celtics, 2–1	Celtics; 4–2	Inaugural season of the Basketball Association of America (BAA). Boston Celtics and New York Knicks are the only teams remaining in the NBA that have not changed their names or relocated. January 18, 1947, Celtics beat the Knicks 58–45, their fewest points allowed in a game against the Knicks and 4th fewest points allowed in a game as a franchise.
1947–48	Knicks	7–1	Knicks, 4–0	Knicks, 3–1	Knicks; 9–5	
1948–49	Tie	3–3	Celtics, 2–1	Knicks, 2–1	Knicks; 12–8	
1949–50	Knicks	5–1	Knicks, 2–1	Knicks, 3–0	Knicks; 17–9	Inaugural season of the NBA. The BAA and National Basketball League (NBL) merge to become the National Basketball Association (NBA).

1950s (Celtics, 69–55)

Season	Season series		at Boston Celtics	at New York Knicks	at Neutral site	Overall series	Notes
1950–51	Tie	4–4	Celtics, 3–1	Knicks, 2–1	Knicks, 1–0	Knicks; 21–13	Neutral game site was played at Rhode Island Auditorium, Providence, Rhode Island.
1951 Eastern Division Semifinals	Knicks	2–0	Knicks, 1–0	Knicks, 1–0	—N/a	Knicks; 23–13	1st postseason series in the rivalry. Knicks go on to lose 1951 NBA Finals.
1951–52	Knicks	5–4	Celtics, 3–2	Knicks, 3–1	—N/a	Knicks; 28–17	
1952 Eastern Division Semifinals	Knicks	2–1	Tie, 1–1	Knicks, 1–0	—N/a	Knicks; 30–18	2nd postseason series. Knicks go on to lose 1952 NBA Finals.
1952–53	Celtics	6–4	Celtics, 4–0	Knicks, 3–1	Tie, 1–1	Knicks; 34–24	Neutral game sites were played at: Convention Hall, Philadelphia, Pennsylvania; Rhode Island Auditorium
1953 Eastern Division Finals	Knicks	3–1	Tie, 1–1	Knicks, 2–0	—N/a	Knicks; 37–25	3rd postseason series. Knicks go on to lose 1953 NBA Finals.
1953–54	Tie	5–5	Tie, 2–2	Tie, 2–2	Tie, 1–1	Knicks; 42–30	Neutral game sites were played at: Philadelphia Arena, Philadelphia, Pennsylvania; Convention Hall
1954 Eastern Division Round-Robin	Celtics	2–0	Celtics, 79–78	Celtics, 93–71		Knicks; 42–32	Only season in NBA history to use Round-Robin format. Celtics win eliminates Knicks from playoffs.
1954–55	Tie	6–6	Celtics, 4–1	Knicks, 4–1	Tie, 1–1	Knicks; 48–38	Neutral game sites were played at: Convention Hall; New Haven Arena, New Haven, Connecticut
1955 Eastern Division Semifinals	Celtics	2–1	Celtics, 1–0	Tie, 1–1	—N/a	Knicks; 49–40	4th postseason series. Celtics win their first playoff series over the Knicks.
1955–56	Knicks	7–5	Celtics, 3–2	Knicks, 3–2	Knicks, 2–0	Knicks; 56–45	Last season Celtics played at Boston Arena. Neutral game sites were played at: Convention Hall; Onondaga War Memorial, Syracuse, New York
1956–57	Celtics	7–5	Celtics, 4–1	Celtics, 3–2	Knicks, 2–0	Knicks; 61–52	Neutral game sites were played at: Convention Hall; Onondaga War Memorial; Celtics have the better record at New York for the first time since the 1946 season. Celtics win 1957 NBA Finals.
1957–58	Celtics	7–5	Celtics, 4–1	Celtics, 3–2	Knicks, 2–0	Knicks; 66–59	Neutral game sites were played at: Convention Hall; Onondaga War Memorial; Celtics lose 1958 NBA Finals.
1958–59	Celtics	7–5	Celtics, 3–2	Celtics, 3–2	Tie, 1–1	Knicks; 71–66	Neutral game sites were played at: Convention Hall; Onondaga War Memorial; Last time in the rivalry Knicks held the overall series record over the Celtics. Celtics win 1959 NBA Finals.
1959–60	Celtics	12–1	Celtics, 4–1	Celtics, 6–0	Celtics, 2–0	Celtics; 78–72	Neutral game sites were played at: Rhode Island Auditorium; Onondaga War Memorial; Celtics take the overall series record over the Knicks for the first time. Celtics win 9 in a row against Knicks. On February 7, 1960, Knicks beat the Celtics 142–135, their most points scored in a game against the Celtics. Celtics win 1960 NBA Finals.

1960s (Celtics, 82–28)

Season	Season series		at Boston Celtics	at New York Knicks	at Neutral site	Overall series	Notes
1960–61	Celtics	10–3	Celtics, 4–1	Celtics, 5–1	Tie, 1–1	Celtics; 88–75	Neutral game sites were played at: Convention Hall; Rhode Island Auditorium; Celtics win 1961 NBA Finals.
1961–62	Celtics	8–4	Celtics, 4–0	Knicks, 4–2	Celtics, 2–0	Celtics; 96–79	Neutral game sites were played at: Rhode Island Auditorium; Convention Hall; Celtics win 1962 NBA Finals.
1962–63	Celtics	10–2	Celtics, 4–1	Celtics, 5–1	Celtics, 1–0	Celtics; 106–81	Neutral game site was played at Kiel Auditorium, St. Louis, Missouri. Celtics record their 100th win over the Knicks. On October 20, 1962, Celtics beat the Knicks 149–116, their most points scored in a game against the Knicks in a regular season game. Celtics win 1963 NBA Finals.
1963–64	Celtics	10–2	Celtics, 5–0	Celtics, 4–2	Celtics, 1–0	Celtics; 116–83	Neutral game site was played at Rhode Island Auditorium. Celtics win 11 in a row against Knicks. Celtics win 1964 NBA Finals.
1964–65	Celtics	7–3	Celtics, 3–0	Celtics, 3–2	Tie, 1–1	Celtics; 123–86	Neutral game sites were played at: Convention Hall; Rhode Island Auditorium; Last season the rivalry was played at a neutral site. Celtics win 1965 NBA Finals.
1965–66	Celtics	10–0	Celtics, 5–0	Celtics, 5–0	—N/a	Celtics; 133–86	Celtics sweep the season series over the Knicks for the first time. Celtics win 1966 NBA Finals.
1966–67	Celtics	9–0	Celtics, 4–0	Celtics, 5–0	—N/a	Celtics; 142–86	Celtics sweep the season series over the Knicks for the second consecutive season.
1967 Eastern Division Semifinals	Celtics	3–1	Tie, 1–1	Celtics, 2–0	—N/a	Celtics; 145–87	5th postseason series. Celtics win 21 games in a row against the Knicks. Celtics go on to lose to the eventual NBA champions 76ers in the Eastern Division Finals, snapping their eight-consecutive NBA titles and ten-consecutive NBA title appearances, both NBA records.
1967–68	Celtics	6–2	Celtics, 3–1	Celtics, 3–1	—N/a	Celtics; 151–89	Final season Knicks played at Madison Square Garden (III). Celtics win 1968 NBA Finals.
1968–69	Knicks	6–1	Knicks, 3–1	Knicks, 3–0	—N/a	Celtics; 152–95	Knicks win the season series for the first time since the 1955 season. Knicks finished with the better record in Boston for the first time since the 1949 season. Knicks open up Madison Square Garden.
1969 Eastern Division Finals	Celtics	4–2	Celtics, 3–0	Knicks, 2–1	—N/a	Celtics; 156–97	6th postseason series. Celtics go on to win 1969 NBA Finals.
1969–70	Celtics	4–3	Celtics, 2–1	Tie, 2–2	—N/a	Celtics; 160–100	Knicks record their 100th win over the Celtics. Knicks win 1970 NBA Finals.

1970s (Celtics, 44–34)

Season	Season series		at Boston Celtics	at New York Knicks	Overall series	Notes
1970–71	Knicks	6–0	Knicks, 3–0	Knicks, 3–0	Celtics; 160–106	Knicks sweep the season series over the Celtics for the first time. On October 28, 1970, Knicks beat the Celtics 126–89, their largest victory over the Celtics with a 37-point differential.
1971–72	Tie	3–3	Celtics, 2–1	Knicks, 2–1	Celtics; 163–109	
1972 Eastern Conference Finals	Knicks	4–1	Knicks, 2–1	Knicks, 2–0	Celtics; 164–113	7th postseason series. Knicks go on to lose 1972 NBA Finals.
1972–73	Tie	4–4	Celtics, 3–1	Knicks, 3–1	Celtics; 168–117	
1973 Eastern Conference Finals	Knicks	4–3	Tie, 2–2	Knicks, 2–1	Celtics; 171–121	8th postseason series. Knicks go on to win 1973 NBA Finals.
1973–74	Celtics	5–2	Celtics, 3–1	Celtics, 2–1	Celtics; 176–123	
1974 Eastern Conference Finals	Celtics	4–1	Celtics, 2–1	Celtics, 2–0	Celtics; 180–124	9th postseason series. Celtics and Knicks meet in three consecutive Eastern Conference Finals. Celtics go on to win 1974 NBA Finals.
1974–75	Celtics	7–2	Celtics, 3–1	Celtics, 4–1	Celtics; 187–126	
1975–76	Celtics	5–2	Celtics, 3–1	Celtics, 2–1	Celtics; 192–128	Celtics win 11 in a row against the Knicks. Celtics win 1976 NBA Finals.
1976–77	Tie	2–2	Tie, 1–1	Tie, 1–1	Celtics; 194–130	
1977–78	Tie	2–2	Celtics, 2–0	Knicks, 2–0	Celtics; 196–132	
1978–79	Celtics	3–1	Celtics, 2–0	Tie, 1–1	Celtics; 199–133	
1979–80	Celtics	5–1	Celtics, 3–0	Celtics, 2–1	Celtics; 204–134	Celtics record their 200th win over the Knicks.

1980s (Celtics, 50–20)

Season	Season series		at Boston Celtics	at New York Knicks	Overall series	Notes
1980–81	Celtics	5–1	Celtics, 2–1	Celtics, 3–0	Celtics; 209–135	One game was played on Christmas. Celtics win 1981 NBA Finals.
1981–82	Celtics	5–1	Celtics, 3–0	Celtics, 2–1	Celtics; 214–136	
1982–83	Tie	3–3	Celtics, 2–1	Knicks, 2–1	Celtics; 217–139	
1983–84	Tie	3–3	Knicks, 2–1	Celtics, 2–1	Celtics; 220–142	Knicks have the better record in Boston for the first time since the 1970 season.
1984 Eastern Conference Semifinals	Celtics	4–3	Celtics, 4–0	Knicks, 3–0	Celtics; 224–145	10th postseason series. 2nd postseason series to reach 10 occurrences behind 76ers–Celics. Home team wins all games in the series. Celtics go on to win 1984 NBA Finals.
1984–85	Celtics	6–0	Celtics, 3–0	Celtics, 3–0	Celtics; 230–145	Celtics sweep the season series over the Knicks for the first time since the 1966 season. Celtics lose 1985 NBA Finals.
1985–86	Celtics	5–1	Celtics, 3–0	Celtics, 2–1	Celtics; 235–146	One game was played on Christmas. Celtics in 10 in a row against Knicks. Knicks break their losing streak in double overtime. Celtics win 1986 NBA Finals.
1986–87	Celtics	4–2	Celtics, 3–0	Knicks, 2–1	Celtics; 239–148	Celtics lose 1987 NBA Finals.
1987–88	Celtics	5–1	Celtics, 3–0	Celtics, 2–1	Celtics; 244–149	
1988 Eastern Conference First Round	Celtics	3–1	Celtics, 2–0	Tie, 1–1	Celtics; 247–150	11th postseason series. First time both teams meet in the first round.
1988–89	Tie	3–3	Celtics, 3–0	Knicks, 3–0	Celtics; 250–153	
1989–90	Celtics	4–1	Celtics, 3–0	Tie, 1–1	Celtics; 254–154	

1990s (Knicks, 32–16)

Season	Season series		at Boston Celtics	at New York Knicks	Overall series	Notes
1990 Eastern Conference First Round	Knicks	3–2	Celtics, 2–1	Knicks, 2–0	Celtics; 256–157	12th postseason series. Celtics win 27 home games in a row against Knicks. In game 2, Celtics beat the Knicks 157–128, their most points in a game against the Knicks and their second most points in a game overall as a franchise.
1990–91	Celtics	5–0	Celtics, 2–0	Celtics, 3–0	Celtics; 261–157	
1991–92	Celtics	3–2	Celtics, 3–0	Knicks, 2–0	Celtics; 264–159	Celtics win 24 regular season home games in a row against Knicks.
1992–93	Knicks	4–1	Knicks, 2–0	Knicks, 2–1	Celtics; 265–163	Knicks win the season series for the first time since the 1970 season.
1993–94	Knicks	4–0	Knicks, 2–0	Knicks, 2–0	Celtics; 265–167	Knicks sweep the season series for the first time since the 1970 season. Knicks lose 1994 NBA Finals.
1994–95	Knicks	5–0	Knicks, 3–0	Knicks, 2–0	Celtics; 265–172	Final season Celtics played at the Boston Garden (as well as splitting their schedule with Hartford Civic Center).
1995–96	Knicks	4–0	Knicks, 2–0	Knicks, 2–0	Celtics; 265–176	Celtics open up Fleet Center (now named TD Garden).
1996–97	Knicks	4–0	Knicks, 2–0	Knicks, 2–0	Celtics; 265–180	
1997–98	Tie	2–2	Celtics, 2–0	Knicks, 2–0	Celtics; 267–182	Knicks win 21 games in a row against Celtics.
1998–99	Knicks	2–1	Celtics, 1–0	Knicks, 2–0	Celtics; 268–184	Knicks lose 1999 NBA Finals.
1999–2000	Tie	2–2	Celtics, 2–0	Knicks, 2–0	Celtics; 270–186	

2000s (Celtics, 29–11)

Season	Season series		at Boston Celtics	at New York Knicks	Overall series	Notes
2000–01	Knicks	3–1	Knicks, 2–0	Tie, 1–1	Celtics; 271–189	Knicks win 15 home games in a row against Celtics.
2001–02	Celtics	4–0	Celtics, 2–0	Celtics, 2–0	Celtics; 275–189	
2002–03	Celtics	4–0	Celtics, 2–0	Celtics, 2–0	Celtics; 279–189	
2003–04	Knicks	3–1	Knicks, 2–0	Tie, 1–1	Celtics; 280–192	
2004–05	Celtics	3–1	Celtics, 2–0	Tie, 1–1	Celtics; 283–193	
2005–06	Celtics	3–1	Tie, 1–1	Celtics, 2–0	Celtics; 286–194	
2006–07	Celtics	3–1	Tie, 1–1	Celtics, 2–0	Celtics; 289–195	
2007–08	Celtics	4–0	Celtics, 2–0	Celtics, 2–0	Celtics; 293–195	On November 29, 2007, Celtics beat the Knicks 104–59, their largest victory against the Knicks with a 45-point margin. It was also the 4th overall worst loss for the Knicks as a franchise. Celtics win 2008 NBA Finals.
2008–09	Celtics	3–1	Celtics, 2–0	Tie, 1–1	Celtics; 296–196	
2009–10	Celtics	3–1	Celtics, 2–0	Tie, 1–1	Celtics; 299–197	Celtics lose 2010 NBA Finals.

2010s (Celtics, 33–16)

Season	Season series		at Boston Celtics	at New York Knicks	Overall series	Notes
2010–11	Celtics	4–0	Celtics, 2–0	Celtics, 2–0	Celtics; 303–197	Celtics record their 300th win over the Knicks.
2011 Eastern Conference First Round	Celtics	4–0	Celtics, 2–0	Celtics, 2–0	Celtics; 307–197	13th postseason series. First postseason series in the 21st century.
2011–12	Tie	2–2	Celtics, 2–0	Knicks, 2–0	Celtics; 309–199	One game was played on Christmas.
2012–13	Knicks	3–1	Knicks, 2–0	Tie, 1–1	Celtics; 310–202	Knicks record their 200th win over the Celtics.
2013 Eastern Conference First Round	Knicks	4–2	Knicks, 2–1	Knicks, 2–1	Celtics; 312–206	14th postseason series. Rivalry becomes the 2nd most frequent postseason series, behind 76ers-Celtics
2013–14	Tie	2–2	Tie, 1–1	Tie, 1–1	Celtics; 314–208	
2014–15	Celtics	3–1	Tie, 1–1	Celtics, 2–0	Celtics; 317–209	
2015–16	Celtics	3–1	Celtics, 2–0	Tie, 1–1	Celtics; 320–210	
2016–17	Celtics	3–1	Tie, 1–1	Celtics, 2–0	Celtics; 323–211	One game was played on Christmas.
2017–18	Celtics	3–1	Celtics, 2–0	Tie, 1–1	Celtics; 326–212	
2018–19	Celtics	3–1	Tie, 1–1	Celtics, 2–0	Celtics; 329–213	
2019–20	Celtics	3–0	Celtics, 1–0	Celtics, 2–0	Celtics; 332–213	Due to the COVID-19 pandemic suspending the season, their final meeting scheduled in Boston was canceled.

2020s (Celtics, 16–15)

Season	Season series		at Boston Celtics	at New York Knicks	Overall series	Notes
2020–21	Knicks	2–1	Tie, 1–1	Knicks, 1–0	Celtics; 333–215	
2021–22	Tie	2–2	Celtics, 2–0	Knicks, 2–0	Celtics; 335–217	Celtics lose 2022 NBA Finals.
2022–23	Knicks	3–1	Knicks, 2–0	Tie, 1–1	Celtics; 336–220	
2023–24	Celtics	4–1	Celtics, 2–1	Celtics, 2–0	Celtics; 340–221	Celtics win 2024 NBA Finals.
2024–25	Celtics	4–0	Celtics, 2–0	Celtics, 2–0	Celtics; 344–221	
2025 Eastern Conference Semifinals	Knicks	4–2	Knicks, 2–1	Knicks, 2–1	Celtics; 346–225	15th postseason series. Cetlics become the first team in the play-by-play era (since the 1996-97 season) to blow 20-point leads in consecutive games, in games 1 and 2.
2025–26	Knicks	3–1	Tie, 1–1	Knicks, 2–0	Celtics; 347–228	Knicks win 2025 NBA Cup. Knicks win 2026 NBA Finals. Final season for Jaylen Brown as a Celtic in the rivalry.
2026–27	Celtics	1–0	Celtics, 1–0	March 14, 2027 and April 4, 2027	Celtics; 348–228	

Summary of Results

Season	Season series		at Boston Celtics	at New York Knicks	at Neutral Site	Notes
Regular season games	Celtics	310–193	Celtics, 171–72	Celtics, 129–111	Knicks, 13–12	
Postseason games	Celtics	38–35	Celtics, 25–14	Knicks, 21–13	—N/a	Includes the 1954 Eastern Division Round Robin (Celtics won both games), and the 2025 Eastern Conference Semifinals (in progress).
Postseason series	Knicks	8–7	Knicks, 6–3	Celtics, 4–2	—N/a	Eastern Division Semifinals: 1951, 1952, 1955, 1967; Eastern Division Finals: 1953, 1969; Eastern Conference First Round: 1988, 1990, 2011, 2013; Eastern Conference Semifinals: 1984, 2025; Eastern Conference Finals: 1972, 1973, 1974
Regular and postseason	Celtics	348–228	Celtics, 195–86	Celtics, 143–132	Knicks, 13–12	There were 25 neutral game sites played in total.: 10 games at Convention Hall; 7 games at Rhode Island Auditorium.; 5 games at Onondaga War Memorial; 1 game at Philadelphia Arena, New Haven Arena and Kiel Auditorium.

== Individual Records ==
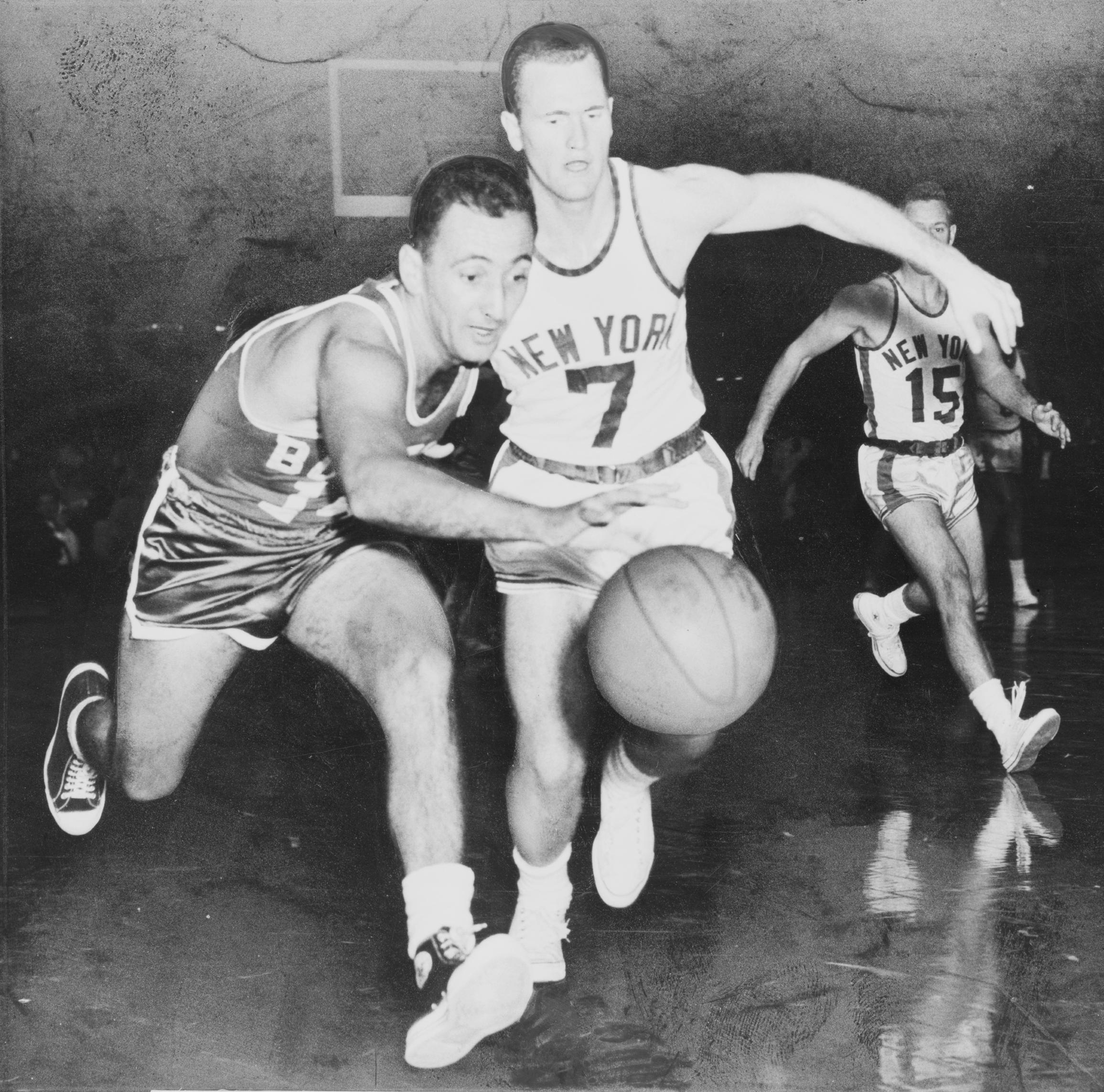
Bob Cousy (left) has scored the most points in this rivalry.

=== Top Scorers (Regular Season) ===
Rank	Player	Team	Points	GP	PPG
1	Bob Cousy	Celtics	2,773	142	19.5
2	John Havlicek	Celtics	2,427	121	20.1
3	Bill Russell	Celtics	2,210	134	16.5
4	Sam Jones	Celtics	2,124	120	17.7
5	Bill Sharman	Celtics	2,012	102	18.1
6	Tom Heinsohn	Celtics	1,993	99	18.6
7	Richie Guerin	Knicks	1,864	85	21.9
8	Larry Bird	Celtics	1,483	60	24.7
9	Patrick Ewing	Knicks	1,480	61	24.3
10	Carl Braun	Knicks	1,477	111	13.3

=== Per Game (Regular Season, min. 20 GP) ===
1. Larry Bird (BOS) – 24.7 (60 GP)
2. Carmelo Anthony (NYK) – 24.5 (22 GP)
3. Jayson Tatum (BOS) – 24.4 (29 GP)
4. Patrick Ewing (NYK) – 24.3 (61 GP)
5. Paul Pierce (BOS) – 23.4 (54 GP)

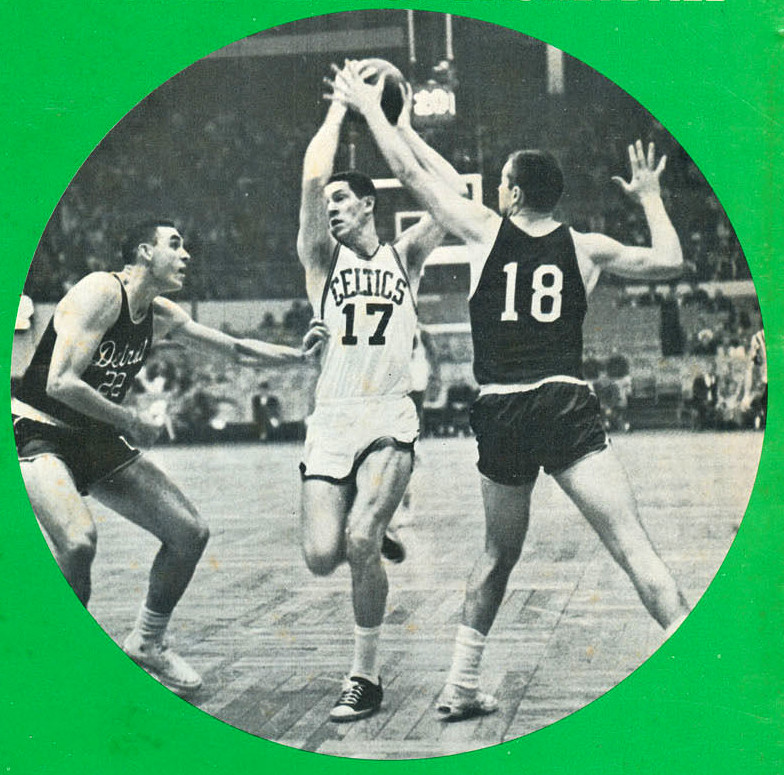
John Havlicek (center) has scored the most points in the playoffs in this rivalry. Dave DeBusschere (left) scored the eighth-most playoff points.

=== Top Scorers (NBA Playoffs) ===
Rank	Player	Team	Points	GP	PPG
1	John Havlicek	Celtics	604	26	23.2
2	Walt Frazier	Knicks	556	23	24.2
3	Larry Bird	Celtics	448	16	28.0
4	Jo Jo White	Celtics	354	17	20.8
5	Don Nelson	Celtics	338	27	12.5
6	Kevin McHale	Celtics	336	16	21.0
6	Willis Reed	Knicks	336	21	16.0
8	Dave DeBusschere	Knicks	335	23	14.6
9	Dave Cowens	Celtics	334	17	19.6
10	Bob Cousy	Celtics	329	14	23.5
10	Bill Bradley	Knicks	329	23	14.3

=== Per Game (Playoffs) ===
1. Bernard King (NYK) – 29.1 (7 GP)
2. Larry Bird (BOS) – 28.0 (16 GP)
3. Carmelo Anthony (NYK) – 27.9 (10 GP)
4. Jalen Brunson (NYK) – 26.2 (6 GP)
5. Patrick Ewing (NYK) – 25.9 (9 GP)

== See also ==
- Red Sox–Yankees rivalry
- Giants–Patriots rivalry
- Jets–Patriots rivalry
- Bruins–Rangers rivalry
