= John Tippets =

American politician from Idaho

John H. Tippets

Member of the Idaho Senate from the 32nd district
- In office February 3, 2011 – July 5, 2015
- Preceded by: Robert L. Geddes
- Succeeded by: Mark Harris

Member of the Idaho House of Representatives from the 32B district
- In office December 1, 1988 – November 30, 2000
- Succeeded by: Clair Cheirrett

Personal details
- Born: January 16, 1952 (age 74) Ogden, Utah, U.S.
- Party: Republican
- Spouse: Nancy
- Children: 9
- Education: Brigham Young University (BS); Utah State University (MS)

John H. Tippets (born January 16, 1952) is an American politician who served as a member of the Idaho Senate for the 31st district from 2011 to 2015, appointed by Governor Butch Otter to fill the vacancy caused by the resignation of Senator Robert L. Geddes.

== Early life and education ==
Tippets was born in Ogden, Utah. He earned his bachelor's degree from Brigham Young University and his master's degree in human resource management from Utah State University.

== Career ==
Outside of government, Tippets has worked as a public affairs manager for Agrium. Tippets was a member of the Idaho House of Representatives from 1988 to 2000. He was appointed to serve as a member of the Idaho Senate in 2011, serving until July 2015. In 2015, Tippets resigned after being appointed director of the Idaho Department of Environmental Quality.

== Elections ==
- 2012 Re-districted to the 32nd district, Tippets won the May 15, 2012, Republican primary with 4,450 votes (57.1%) against R. Scott Workman. He was unopposed for the November 6, 2012 general election.
- First took office in 1988, and won re-election in 1990 and 1992.
- 1994 Was unopposed for the May 24, 1994, Republican primary, winning with 4,549 votes, and was unopposed for the November 8, 1994, general election, winning with 9,544 votes.
- 1996 Was unopposed for the May 28, 1996, Republican primary, winning with 3,305 votes, and was unopposed for the November 5, 1996, general election, winning with 9,828 votes.
- 1998 Was unopposed for the May 26, 1998, Republican primary, winning with 3,757 votes, and was unopposed for the November 3, 1998, general election, winning with 8,238 votes.

Tippets was not a candidate for re-election in 2000.
