= J. F. Chadband =

American politician

Member of the Idaho House of Representatives
- In office 1983–1986
- Succeeded by: Thomas Loertscher

Personal details
- Born: March 15, 1927 Orcutt, California, U.S.
- Died: May 29, 2016 (aged 89)
- Party: Republican
- Education: University of Idaho

J. F. Chadband (March 15, 1927 – May 29, 2016) was an American politician. He served as a Republican member of the Idaho House of Representatives.

== Life and career ==
Chadband was born in Orcutt, California. He attended the University of Idaho.

Chadband served in the Idaho House of Representatives from 1983 to 1986.

Chadband died on May 29, 2016, at the age of 89.
