= Jerry Twiggs =

American politician from Idaho (1933–2000)

38th President pro tempore of the Idaho Senate
- In office 1993 – January 10, 2000
- Preceded by: Mike Crapo
- Succeeded by: Robert L. Geddes

Member of the Idaho Senate
- In office December 1, 1984 – January 10, 2000
- Succeeded by: J. Stanley Williams
- Constituency: 26th district (1984–1992); 31st district (1992–2000)

Personal details
- Born: Jerry Thomas Twiggs; March 25, 1933 Bingham County, Idaho, U.S.
- Died: January 10, 2000 (aged 66) Boise, Idaho, U.S.
- Party: Republican
- Spouse: Sandra
- Children: 2

Jerry Thomas Twiggs (March 25, 1933 – January 15, 2000) was an American politician who served as a member of the Idaho Senate for the 31st district from 1986 to 2000.

== Career ==
Outside of politics, Twiggs worked as a farmer. He was elected to the Idaho Senate in 1986 and later served as Republican floor leader. He also served as the 38th president pro tempore of the Senate from 1993 until his death in 2000. Twiggs was a regional leader in the Church of Jesus Christ of Latter-day Saints.

== Personal life ==
Twiggs married his wife, Sandra, in the Idaho Falls Idaho Temple in 1951. They had two sons.
