= Chad Christensen (Idaho politician) =

Former American politician from Idaho

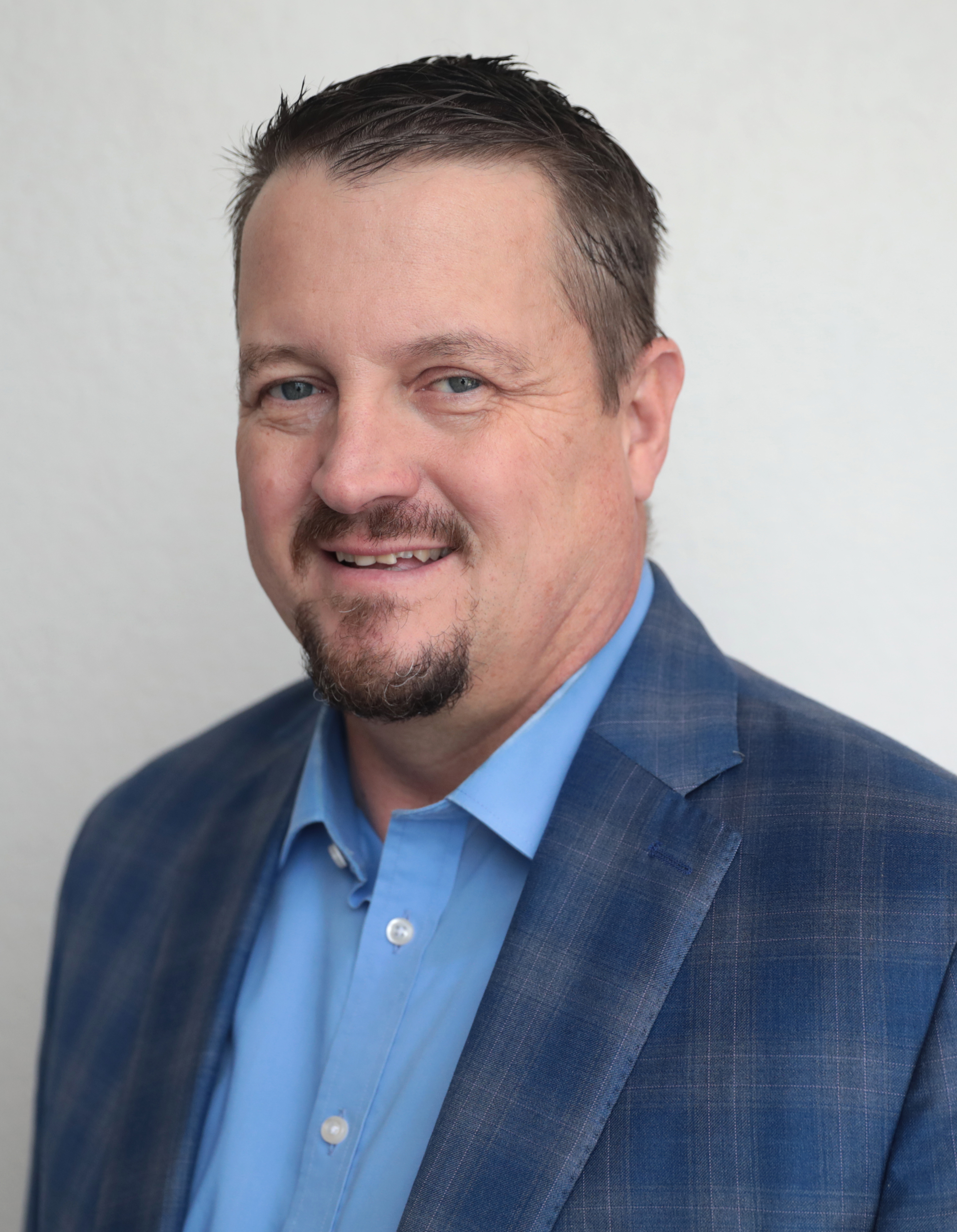
- Christensen at the 2022 Hazlitt Summit hosted by Young Americans for Liberty

Member of the Idaho House of Representatives from 32nd district Seat B
- In office December 1, 2018 – November 30, 2022
- Preceded by: Thomas Loertscher
- Succeeded by: Josh Wheeler (lost primary election)

Personal details
- Born: Idaho Falls, Idaho, U.S.
- Party: Republican
- Parent: Mike Veile (father)
- Education: Ricks College (AS); Idaho State University (BS)
- Website: www.chadchristensen.org

Military service
- Branch/service: United States Army

Chad Christensen is an American politician, former law enforcement officer, and U.S. Army veteran, who is a former member of the Idaho House of Representatives for the 32nd district, Seat B. He is a Republican.

== Early life and education ==
Christensen was born in Idaho Falls, Idaho in 1973. He graduated from Ricks College in Rexburg, Idaho, with an associate degree in criminal justice. He also graduated from Idaho State University in Pocatello, Idaho, with a Bachelor of Science degree in political science.

== Career ==
Christensen was in the US Army for 12 years, and also worked in law enforcement.

Christensen was listed as a member of the group Oath Keepers.

In 2019, Christensen waged a public campaign against Boise State University, stating his intention to defund them over their alleged use of gender neutral bathrooms.

During the 2020-2021 COVID-19 pandemic, Christensen was an outspoken critic of vaccines and social distancing public orders. In October 2020, he appeared in a video produced by the Idaho Freedom Foundation. He, Lieutenant Governor Janice McGeachin, and other state legislators criticized Idaho Governor Brad Little for the state's COVID-19 restrictions.

Christensen lost his bid for re-election to Ammon City Councilman Josh Wheeler in the 2022 primaries. He chose not to run in the 2024 primaries. In 2026, he led an unsuccessful campaign in the primaries.
