= Thomas Loertscher =

American politician (born 1944)

Member of the Idaho House of Representatives
- In office December 1, 2004 – December 1, 2018
- Preceded by: Eulalie Teichert Langford
- Succeeded by: Chad Christensen
- In office December 1, 1986 – December 1, 2002
- Preceded by: J. F. Chadband
- Succeeded by: Elaine Smith
- Constituency: District 32 Seat B (1986-92, 2012-18); District 31 Seat B (2004-12); District 30 Seat B (1992-2002)

Personal details
- Born: January 4, 1944 (age 82) Park City, Utah
- Party: Republican (formerly)
- Education: University of Utah
- Website: reptom.com

Military service
- Branch/service: United States Army Reserve
- Years of service: 1966–1972

Thomas F. Loertscher (born January 4, 1944, in Park City, Utah) is an American politician, and former Republican member of the Idaho House of Representatives, in the District 32 B seat.

== Education ==
Loertscher graduated from Park City High School and earned his BS in accounting from the University of Utah.

== Elections ==
=== 2020 ===
Loertscher took second losing to Jon Walker in the Republican Primary for Bonneville County Commissioner District 2.

=== 2018 ===
After losing in the 2018 Republican Primary to challenger Chad Christensen, Loertscher abandoned his Republican Party affiliation to run an Independent write-in campaign for his legislative seat. Loertscher went on to the November general election to lose to Christensen again, 2,247 votes to Christensen's 11,044. Butch Otter would later be censured over his support over the independent run by the Idaho Republican Party.

=== 2012 ===
Loertscher was redistricted to District 32, and with Republican Representative Erik Simpson not running, Loertscher won the three-way May 15, 2012 Republican Primary with 4,257 votes (54.4%), and won the November 6, 2012 General election with 14,416 votes (73.7%) against Democratic nominee Ralph Mossman, his challenger from 2008 and 2010.

=== 2010 ===
Loertscher and Mossman were both unopposed for their May 25, 2010 primaries, setting up a rematch; Loertscher won his with 6,003 votes, and won the November 2, 2010 General Election with 9,965 votes (68.4%) against Mossman.

=== 2008 ===
Loertscher won the four-way May 27, 2008 Republican Primary with 3,157 votes (44.4%), and won the November 4, 2008 General Election with 15,421 votes (98.2%) against write-in candidate Ralph Mossman.

=== 2006 ===
Langford challenged Loertscher in a rematch for the May 23, 2006 Republican Primary; Loertscher won with 3,697 votes (56.3%), and was unopposed for the November 7, 2006 General Election, winning with 12,170 votes.

=== 2004 ===
Loertscher challenged incumbent Republican Representative Eulalie Langford for the District 31 B seat in the May 25, 2004 Republican Primary, and won with 3,953 votes (50.73%), and was unopposed for the November 2, 2004 General election, winning with 14,393 votes.

=== 2002 ===
Redistricted to 31A, and with Republican Representative Dennis Lake redistricted to 28A, Loertscher lost the May 28, 2002 Republican Primary to Representative Larry Bradford, Bradford won the General election and held the seat until 2008.

=== 2000 ===
Loertscher won the May 23, 2000 Republican Primary with 2,656 votes (59.9%), and won the November 7, General election with 8,523 votes (62.4%) against Democratic nominee Claire Ashton-Heckathorn.

=== 1998 ===
Loertscher was unopposed for both the May 26, 1998 Republican Primary, winning with 3,780 votes, and the November 3, 1998 General election, winning with 9,025 votes

=== 1996 ===
Loertscher won the May 28, 1996 Republican Primary with 2,291 votes (58%), and won the November 5, 1996 General election with 8,326 votes (63.5%) against Democratic nominee Steven Fernandez.

=== 1994 ===
Loertscher was unopposed for both the May 24, 1994 Republican Primary, winning with 3,120 votes, and the November 8, 1994 General election, winning with 10,037 votes.

=== 1992 ===
With Republican Representative JoAn Wood redistricted to District 26A, Loertscher won the District 30 B seat 1992 Republican Primary and the November 3, 1992 General election.

=== 1990 ===
Loertscher was originally elected in the District 30 D Seat in the November 6, 1990, General election.

Preceded by Erik Simpson	Member of the Idaho House of Representatives from District 32 Seat B December 1, 2012 - December 1, 2018	Succeeded by Chad Christensen
Preceded by Eulalie Teichert Langford	Member of the Idaho House of Representatives from District 31 Seat B December 1, 2004 - December 1, 2012	Succeeded by Julie VanOrden
Preceded by JoAn Wood	Member of the Idaho House of Representatives from District 30 Seat B December 1, 1992 - December 1, 2002	Succeeded by Elaine Smith
Preceded by J. F. Chadband	Member of the Idaho House of Representatives from District 32 Seat B December 1, 1986 - December 1, 1992	Succeeded by Seat abolished
