= Giants–Patriots rivalry =

American football rivalry

- New York Giants New England Patriots
- First meeting: October 18, 1970; Giants 16, Patriots 0
- Latest meeting: December 1, 2025; Patriots 33, Giants 15
- Next meeting: TBD (no later than 2027 season)
- Stadiums: Giants: MetLife Stadium; Patriots: Gillette Stadium

Statistics
- Total meetings: 15
- All-time series: Patriots: 8–7
- Regular season series: Patriots: 8–5
- Postseason results: Giants: 2–0
- Largest victory: Giants: 16–0 (1970); Patriots: 35–14 (2019)
- Most points scored: Giants: 35 (2007); Patriots: 38 (2007)
- Longest win streak: Giants: 3 (2007–2012); Patriots: 4 (1996–2011)
- Current win streak: Patriots: 1 (2025–present)

Post–season history
- Super Bowl XLII: Giants won: 17–14; Super Bowl XLVI: Giants won: 21–17

The Giants–Patriots rivalry is a National Football League (NFL) rivalry between the New York Giants and New England Patriots.

They play in different conferences (the Giants as a member of the NFC East, and the Patriots as a member of the AFC East), and thus they only meet once every four regular seasons and at least once every eight seasons at each team's home stadium, occasionally in the preseason, sometimes more often if they meet in the Super Bowl or share a common finish position in their respective divisions in the year before the 17th game. This rivalry sparked debates among sports fans in Boston and New York City, evoking comparisons to the fierce Red Sox–Yankees rivalry in Major League Baseball.

The Patriots currently play at Gillette Stadium in Foxborough, Massachusetts, just outside of Boston, while the Giants currently play at MetLife Stadium in East Rutherford, New Jersey, just outside of New York City. The two stadiums are 207 miles (333 km) from each other via Interstate 95.

The rivalry became particularly noticeable during the 2000s and 2010s, when the underdog New York Giants, led by quarterback Eli Manning, defeated Tom Brady and the New England Patriots in Super Bowl XLII and Super Bowl XLVI. Super Bowl XLII was especially significant, as the Giants ended the Patriots' undefeated season in what is considered one of the greatest upsets in American sports history. These dramatic upsets helped fuel what became known as the Tom Brady–Eli Manning rivalry.

The Patriots lead the overall series, 8–7. The two teams met twice in the Super Bowl, both won by the Giants.

== History ==
=== 1970s–1990s: The beginning ===
The two teams first met twice in the 1970s, splitting both meetings. However, the roots of the rivalry originated from Bill Parcells, who was head coach of the Giants from 1983 to 1990. Parcells' staff featured defensive coordinator Bill Belichick, the future Patriots head coach who joined the team alongside Parcells in 1979. In 1988, future Giants head coach Tom Coughlin joined the team as a wide receivers coach. Both Belichick and Coughlin were on Parcells' staff when the Giants won Super Bowl XXV (a.k.a. the Wide Right game) following the 1990 season. That 1990 season also saw the Giants hand the Patriots their 14th consecutive defeat. In Week 17 at New England, the Giants defeated the Patriots 13–10 to send New England to a franchise-worst 1–15 season, and a winless home campaign.

Parcells left the Giants following the Super Bowl victory, but in 1993, he took over as the Patriots head coach. In his fourth season, Parcells led the Patriots to a berth in Super Bowl XXXI, with Belichick returning as an assistant coach following a five-year stint as head coach of the Cleveland Browns. Along the way, the Patriots clinched a first-round bye in Week 17 by overcoming a 22–3 fourth quarter deficit to defeat the Giants 23–22. Meanwhile, Coughlin earned his first head coaching job with the Jacksonville Jaguars in the 1995 season, and then guided the second-year franchise to the AFC Championship game. However, the Patriots defeated the Jaguars to advance to the Super Bowl, where they lost to the Green Bay Packers. After the season, both Parcells and Belichick left to join the rival New York Jets, while Coughlin remained as the Jaguars head coach until 2002.

=== 2000s–2010s: Tom Brady vs. Eli Manning ===
In 2000, Belichick became the Patriots head coach, and the following season, promoted Tom Brady to starting quarterback. This era would produce six Super Bowl championships for the Patriots, but also oversaw three defeats in the title game. In the 2004 season, Coughlin was hired by the Giants as head coach, and by the middle of the season, promoted Eli Manning to starter.

The first meeting between Brady and Eli Manning came in the final week of the 2007 season. New England entered the game holding a 15–0 record and were attempting to finish the regular season undefeated. Meanwhile, the Giants won a wild-card spot and had nothing to play for. However, New York played their starters throughout in an attempt to spoil the Patriots' perfect season. In the end, New England won the game 38–35 to finish 16–0, with Brady connecting for a then-record 50th touchdown pass to Randy Moss.

The Patriots met the Giants again in Super Bowl XLII in an attempt to finish with a 19–0 season. However, in one of the greatest upsets in NFL history, the Giants defeated the Patriots 17–14 to win the championship. With the Patriots leading 14–10 late in the fourth quarter, Manning generated a key go-ahead scoring drive, highlighted by the now-famous Helmet Catch to David Tyree. The winning points were scored on a touchdown pass to Plaxico Burress, and the Giants defense forced the Patriots into a turnover on downs on their final possession.

The two teams faced each other again in Super Bowl XLVI during the 2011 season. Along the way, the Giants dealt the Patriots one of their three defeats in the regular season, winning 24–20 in New England. Much like their previous Super Bowl meeting, the game was tightly contested and had a signature moment as well, with Manning connecting to Mario Manningham late in the fourth quarter just as his toes barely stepped inbounds. The winning points of the game were scored on an uncontested touchdown run by Ahmad Bradshaw, and the Patriots' attempt at a Hail Mary touchdown in the closing seconds fell incomplete.

The two Super Bowls stirred up real conflict among fans in states between Massachusetts and New York. In Connecticut, some people cheered for the Giants, some for the Patriots. The split often followed geography, age, family tradition, or reactions to the Patriots’ dominance. For many, the Giants’ upset wins felt like symbolic victories over a team viewed as the “eventual winner".

The final meeting between Brady and Eli Manning occurred during the 2015 season. In another close contest, the Patriots barely won 27–26, with kicker Stephen Gostkowski clinching the game on a last-second field goal. The season was also Coughlin's last with the Giants as he retired following the season. Though Manning would retire following the 2019 season, he did not play in the Giants' 35–14 blowout loss to the Patriots that season, which was also Brady's last before joining the Tampa Bay Buccaneers the following offseason.

Overall, Eli Manning owned a 3–2 all-time record against Tom Brady, buoyed by the two Super Bowl victories. In the regular season, neither quarterback managed to win on their home field, with Manning defeating Brady in their only meeting at Gillette Stadium in 2011 and Brady winning at Giants Stadium in 2007 and MetLife Stadium in 2015. This rivalry, similar to the matchup between Brady and Eli's brother Peyton, featured close contests and memorable moments between the two quarterbacks, even though Eli finished with all-time stats generally inferior to Brady.

=== 2020s: Both teams struggle ===
After the departure of Brady and the retirement of Eli Manning in 2019, both the Giants and Patriots struggled to recapture their previous success. Aside from playoff berths by the Patriots in 2021 and the Giants in 2022, both teams have endured numerous losing seasons.

The 2023 season saw the series tied 7–7 as Patriots rookie kicker Chad Ryland missed a game-tying field goal that would have sent the game to overtime, giving the Giants a 10–7 victory. This marked Belichick's final game of the rivalry as the Patriots' head coach as he parted ways with the team the following offseason.

In 2024, both teams finished last in their divisions, resulting in a 2025 meeting due to the rotation of the fifth interconference game first played in 2021, pairing each NFC East team in a 2025 road game against the AFC East team with the same division placement as 2024.

== Season-by-season results ==
New York Giants vs. Boston/New England Patriots Season-by-Season Results
1970s–1980s (Giants, 2–1)

Season	Results	Location	Overall series	Notes
1970	Giants; 16–0	Harvard Stadium	Giants; 1–0	
1974	Patriots; 28–20	Yale Bowl	Tie; 1–1	
1987	Giants; 17–10	Giants Stadium	Giants; 2–1	

1990s (Patriots, 2–1)

Season	Results	Location	Overall series	Notes
1990	Giants; 13–10	Foxboro Stadium	Giants; 3–1	Giants win Super Bowl XXV.
1996	Patriots; 23–22	Giants Stadium	Giants; 3–2	Patriots rally from 22–3 deficit, earn first-round bye with this win. Patriots lose Super Bowl XXXI.
1999	Patriots; 16–14	Foxboro Stadium	Tie; 3–3	

2000s (Patriots, 2–1)

Season	Results	Location	Overall series	Notes
2003	Patriots; 17–6	Gillette Stadium	Patriots; 4–3	First start in the series for Tom Brady. Patriots take first lead in the series. Patriots win Super Bowl XXXVIII.
2007	Patriots; 38–35	Giants Stadium	Patriots; 5–3	First start in the series for Eli Manning. Patriots clinch 16–0 regular season.
2007 playoffs	Giants 17–14	University of Phoenix Stadium	Patriots 5–4	Super Bowl XLII. Giants ended the Patriots' 18-game winning streak and their quest for a perfect season. Eli Manning's pass to David Tyree in the fourth quarter became known as the Helmet Catch.

2010s (Tied, 2–2)

Season	Results	Location	Overall series	Notes
2011	Giants; 24–20	Gillette Stadium	Tie; 5–5	Giants win was the Patriots only home loss in the 2011 season.
2011 playoffs	Giants 21–17	Lucas Oil Stadium	Giants 6–5	Super Bowl XLVI. Giants ended the Patriots’ 10-game winning streak and became the first NFL team to win the Super Bowl with a negative regular-season point differential, as well as the first to win the Super Bowl with fewer than 10 regular-season wins in a 16-game season.
2015	Patriots; 27–26	MetLife Stadium	Tied; 6–6	Final start in the series for Eli Manning.
2019	Patriots; 35–14	Gillette Stadium	Patriots; 7–6	Largest margin of victory in the series. Final start in the series for Tom Brady. Eli Manning's final NFL season.

2020s (Tied, 1–1)

Season	Results	Location	Overall series	Notes
2023	Giants; 10–7	MetLife Stadium	Tie; 7–7	
2025	Patriots; 33–15	Gillette Stadium	Patriots; 8–7	Patriots lose Super Bowl LX.

Summary of Results

Season	Season series	at New York Giants	at Boston/New England Patriots	Notes
Regular season	Patriots 8–5	Patriots 4–2	Patriots 4–3	
Postseason	Giants 2–0	N/A	N/A	Super Bowls: XLII, XLVI
Regular and postseason	Patriots 8–7	Patriots 4–2	Patriots 4–3	Giants are 2–0 at neutral site games

== See also ==
- List of NFL rivalries
- Jets–Patriots rivalry
- Red Sox–Yankees rivalry
- Celtics–Knicks rivalry
