= Erik Simpson =

American politician from Idaho

Member of the Idaho House of Representatives from the 32B district
- In office December 1, 2008 – December 1, 2012
- Preceded by: Dean Mortimer
- Succeeded by: Thomas Loertscher

Personal details
- Party: Republican
- Spouse: Fawn
- Education: University of Idaho
- Profession: Business Owner/Operator

Erik Simpson was a Republican Idaho State Representative representing District 32 in the B seat from 2008 to 2012.

== Education ==
Simpson earned his bachelor's degree from the University of Idaho.

== Elections ==
=== 2008 ===
Republican Representative Dean Mortimer left the 32B seat open to pursue the district's open senate seat.

Simpson won the May 27, 2008, Republican primary with 1,891 votes (59.2%) against Ann Rydalch.

Simpson was unopposed in the November 4, 2008, general election and won with 17,384 votes.

=== 2010 ===
Simpson was unopposed in the Republican primary and won with 4,511 votes.

Simpson was unopposed in the November 2, 2010, general election, which he won with 12,748 votes.

== Idaho House of Representatives ==
=== 2011–2012 ===
In the 2011–2012 legislative session, Simpson served on these committees:

- Commerce and Human Resources
- Environment, Energy and Technology
- State Affairs

=== 2009–2010 ===
In the 2009–2010 legislative session, Simpson served on these committees:

- Commerce and Human Resources
- Environment, Energy and Technology
- State Affairs
