= Idaho Department of Environmental Quality =

State agency in Idaho, United States

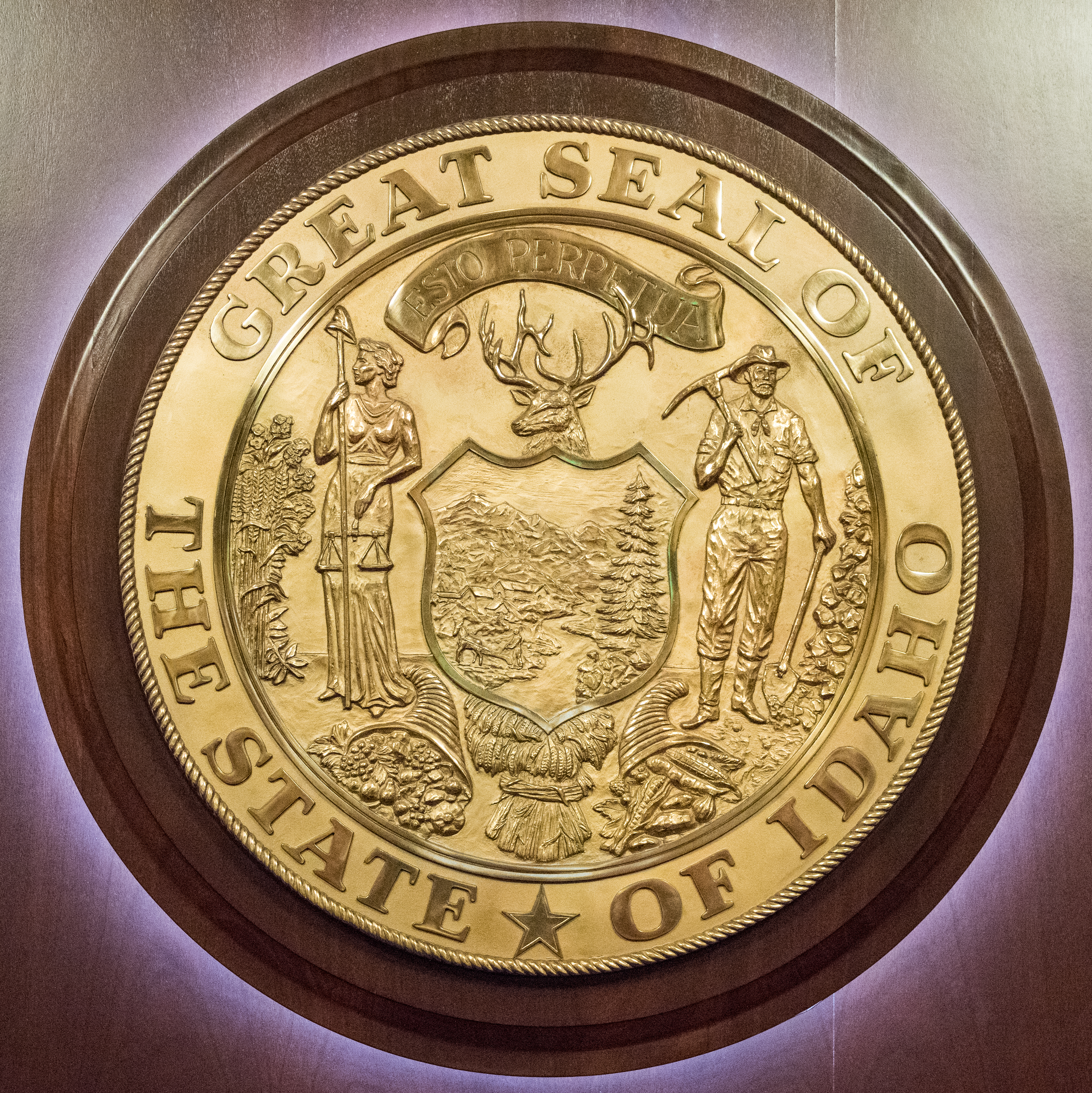

Agency overview
- Jurisdiction: Government of Idaho
- Headquarters: 1410 N Hilton St, Boise, Idaho
- Agency executive: Jess Byrne, Director
- Website: https://www.deq.idaho.gov/

The Idaho Department of Environmental Quality is the department of the Idaho state government responsible for administering state and federal environmental laws and regulations. The department's main offices are in Boise, and six regional offices are also maintained.

== History ==
The department was established in 2000 upon the passing of amendments to the Idaho Environmental Protection and Health Act. Before 2000, DEQ in Idaho was a division of the Department of Health and Welfare.

== Structure and functions ==
It is organized into five divisions:

- Air Quality: responsible for monitoring air pollution and permits relating to the same
- Water Quality: sets water quality standards and monitors ground, surface, and drinking water quality
- Waste Management and Remediation: responsible for all issues relating to waste disposal
- Environmental Management and Information: provides technical communications services, including publications
- Technical Services: the research and technical enforcement division, including inspection activities

The department also exercises non-regulatory oversight of the Idaho National Laboratory.

The director of the department reports to the governor. Additional regulatory authority is vested in the Idaho Board of Environmental Quality, which, with the advice of the state attorney general, sets rules and regulations that the department carries out.
