= Erin Bingham =

American politician

Member of the Idaho House of Representatives from the 32B district
- Incumbent
- Assumed office January 10, 2026
- Preceded by: Wendy Horman

Personal details
- Party: Republican

Erin Bingham is an American politician who has been a member of the Idaho House of Representatives since January 2026. Governor Brad Little appointed her to replace Wendy Horman. Bingham is the chief financial officer of Bingham Ventures, a "family-operated development organization".
