= Jets–Patriots rivalry =

National Football League rivalry

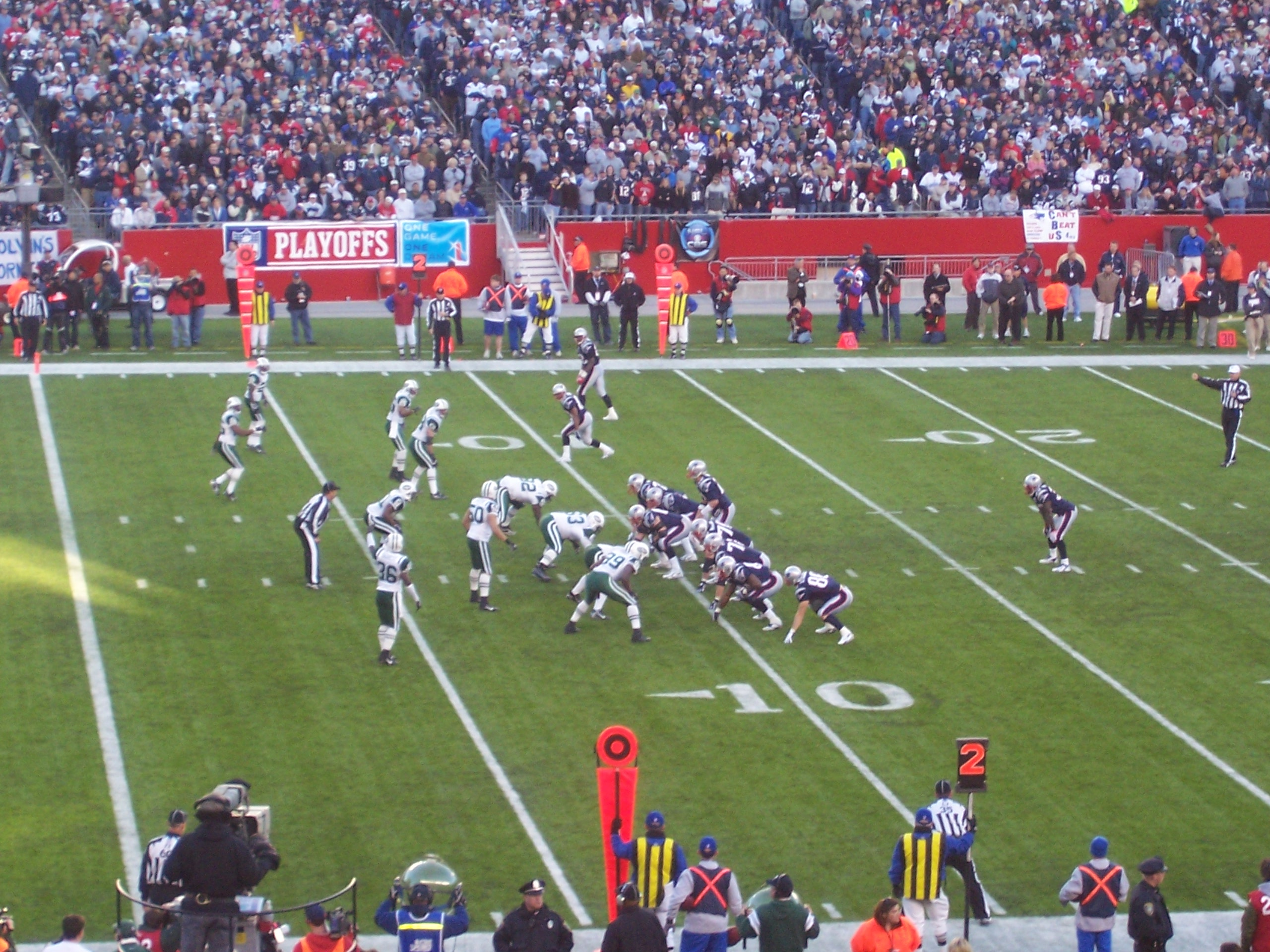
- Jets and Patriots face off during the 2006 AFC Wild Card round.

- New York Jets New England Patriots
- Location: New York City, Boston
- First meeting: September 17, 1960; Patriots 28, Titans 24
- Latest meeting: October 18, 2026; Patriots 26, Jets 19
- Next meeting: December 27, 2026
- Stadiums: Jets: MetLife Stadium; Patriots: Gillette Stadium

Statistics
- Total meetings: 135
- All-time series: Patriots: 78–56–1
- Regular season series: Patriots: 75–55–1
- Postseason results: Patriots: 2–1
- Largest victory: Jets: 45–7 (1993); Patriots: 56–3 (1979)
- Most points scored: Jets: 48 (1968); Patriots: 56 (1979)
- Longest win streak: Jets: 9 (1966-1970); Patriots: 15 (2016–2023)
- Current win streak: Patriots: 3 (2024–present)

Post-season history
- 1985 AFC Wild Card: Patriots won: 26–14; 2006 AFC Wild Card: Patriots won: 37–16; 2010 AFC Divisional: Jets won: 28–21

The Jets–Patriots rivalry is a National Football League (NFL) rivalry between the New York Jets and the New England Patriots.

Both teams play in the AFC East. They have been in the same division since the two teams' inception in 1960 in the American Football League, and have played each other at least twice a year since then. Games between the two teams have often played out like the fierce Red Sox–Yankees rivalry in Major League Baseball, given the geographic rivalry between New York City and Boston.

The Patriots lead the overall series, 78–56–1. The two teams have met three times in the playoffs, with the Patriots holding a 2–1 record.

== History ==
=== 1960–1969: The AFL years ===
The New York Jets (then known as the Titans of New York) and the New England Patriots (then known as the Boston Patriots) were charter members of the American Football League (AFL).

In the two clubs' first meeting on September 17, 1960, the Titans hosted the Patriots at New York's Polo Grounds. Al Dorow of the Titans erupted to three touchdown throws and led the Titans to a 24–7 lead in the third quarter. But Butch Songin and 109 rushing yards by Patriots runners closed the gap to 24–21 in the fourth quarter, then Chuck Shonta finished off the Titans when punter Rick Sapienza fumbled the snap to take a 28–24 lead. The ball bounced around wildly until Shonta picked up the ball at the 25 and ran in for a touchdown. The Titans argued that Patriots' linebacker Jack Rudolph had kicked the ball, which was illegal, during the chase for the ball, but the play stood, resulting in a 28–24 Patriots win.

Despite losing the inaugural game, the Titans/Jets posted a record of 12–7–1 during the AFL years. The tie occurred on October 2, 1966. This was the only tie in the rivalry's history. The Patriots led 24–7 after three quarters but two Joe Namath touchdowns and a Jim Turner field goal tied the game. It would also be the last time the Patriots did not lose to the Jets until 1971. Later that season, the Jets knocked the Patriots out of the playoff race in Shea Stadium as three Joe Namath touchdown throws (including a 77-yard strike to George Sauer, Jr.) led the Jets to a 38–28 win, despite Vito Parilli throwing for 379 yards.

=== 1970–1979: Joining the NFL ===
The Jets continued their success in the series through the 1970s, posting a 12–8 record against their rival. The Jets dominated the early part of the decade, going 10–2 from 1970 to 1975, while the Patriots went 6–2 from 1976 to 1979.

On October 13, 1974, at Shea Stadium the Patriots shut out the then-1–4 Jets, 24–0, as Sam Cunningham rushed in two touchdowns and Bob Geddes ran back a Joe Namath interception for a 23-yard touchdown; the win was New England's fifth straight in 1974 and first over the Jets since October 10, 1971. Five weeks later, on November 17, the Jets, rolled to a 21–16 win as Namath threw two touchdowns and Jim Plunkett was picked off four times. The win put the Jets at 3–7 as they finished the season with a six-game winning streak while the Patriots fell to 7–7.

On October 18, 1976, The Patriots hosted the Jets on Monday Night Football, which was unofficially renamed "Monday Night Madness" when the rowdiness of drunken fans at Schaefer Stadium led to mass arrests by local police and the cuffing of fans to a chain-link fence when other space became unavailable. Patriots running backs Andy Johnson, Don Calhoun, and Sam Cunningham and quarterback Steve Grogan combined for 330 rushing yards and five touchdowns, including a fumble recovered by Grogan in the second quarter. Grogan also completed a short touchdown pass to Johnson, culminating in a 41–7 Patriots win. The game achieved further notoriety as Jets coach Lou Holtz had authored a fight song for the team that was mockingly read on the pregame by Alex Karras, who was providing color analysis for ABC Sports.

Later that season on November 21, Namath threw six interceptions; Mike Haynes had three interceptions and Prentice McCray had two, both of which were returned for touchdowns. Jets' backup Richard Todd threw a seventh interception in the fourth quarter, while the Jets also lost three fumbles, as the Patriots won 38–24.

On October 29, 1978, the Patriots erupted to a 48–7 third quarter lead, ultimately winning 55–21. Jets coach Walt Michaels felt the Patriots were decifering his coaching staff's signals and suspected a rival team had told these codes to the Patriots. Michaels explained afterward, "This will never happen to us again. I know what they did, but by the time we figured it out, it was too late." Later that season the Houston Oilers erased a 23–0 gap to beat the Patriots, 26–23, and there was speculation the Jets had told Oilers coaches about Patriots codes.

On September 9, 1979, Grogan set a Patriots record with five touchdown passes in a 56–3 Patriots win at Schaefer Stadium; his touchdown record stood until Tom Brady broke it in 2007. Following the game a scuffle ensued in the crowded locker room between cornerback Raymond Clayborn and Boston Globe writer Will McDonough. Harold Jackson caught three touchdown passes in the game.

=== 1980–1996 ===
Parity took over this rivalry over much of the next two decades, as the Patriots posted a 19–15 record between 1980 and 1996. This time saw highs and lows for both teams. The Patriots appeared in Super Bowls XX and XXXI following the 1985 and 1996 seasons, respectively, but lost at least ten games every year from 1989 to 1993. Meanwhile, the Jets had five playoff appearances in the 1980s and early 1990s, but fell to the bottom of the league by the mid-1990s.

On October 28, 1984, Patriots head coach Ron Meyer fired assistant coach Rod Rust, but he did not have the authority to do so and was fired himself. Raymond Berry, an assistant with Chuck Fairbanks and Ron Erhardt, was hired, and his first game was against the Jets. The Jets bolted to a 10–0 lead and then led 20–6 at the half, but the Patriots led by running back Craig James fought back and scored 24 unanswered points by Tony Franklin, James, Tony Eason, Tony Collins, and Stephen Starring for a 30–20 Patriots win. Collins later said Berry earned the respect of the locker room in that one game.

In the first playoff meeting between the two clubs on December 28, 1985, the Patriots traveled to Giants Stadium. The Jets took a 7–3 in the second quarter, but the Patriots scored 23 points in a 26–14 win, the team's first playoff win in the NFL and first overall since 1963. The Patriots would go onto Super Bowl XX that season, but fall short to the Chicago Bears.

The October 12, 1986 meeting saw memorable performances by Jets running back Johnny Hector and Patriots quarterback Steve Grogan, who was replacing oft-injured starter Tony Eason. Hector rushed for 143 yards and three touchdowns as the Jets built a 24–0 halftime lead. Grogan, throwing for 401 yards and three scores, led a Patriots comeback, but with the Jets holding a tenuous 31–24 led with one minute remaining, Grogan completed a 31-yard pass to Irving Fryar across midfield. Fryar fumbled the ball when he was hit by Jets defenders, securing the Jets win.

On October 16, 1994, The Jets hosted the Patriots with both teams at 3–3. Future Patriots coach Pete Carroll was in his first year heading the Jets while future Jets coach Bill Parcells was in his second season heading the Patriots. Brad Baxter rushed for two touchdowns and Boomer Esiason threw for an additional score despite being sacked six times. The Patriots lost the turnover battle, losing three fumbles and one interception en route to a 24–17 Jets win. Former Jets running back Blair Thomas rushed for 63 yards and a 4-yard touchdown for New England.

On November 10, 1996, the Jets, coming into this contest with only four wins since the start of 1995, raced to a 21–0 second quarter lead after holding Patriots QB Drew Bledsoe without a completion in the entire first quarter. From there Bledsoe went 24–30 for 297 yards and overcame two interceptions and two sacks. After a Terry Glenn score in the second quarter, Bledsoe's second touchdown went to Ben Coates and tied the game at 24. A Jets field goal made it 27–24 when Bledsoe completed a pass to Coates at the 50-yard line on 4th and 2. The Jets disputed the ball spot by line judge Charles Stewart (the ball spot was also criticized by ESPN) but the first down call stood, and Bledsoe found Keith Byars for the game-winning score. A late Jets rally was stopped on an endzone interception by Lawyer Milloy for a 31–27 Patriots win.

==== 1997–1999: Bill Parcells moves to the Jets ====
Patriots' head coach Bill Parcells' contract was set to expire after the Patriots' appearance in Super Bowl XXXI. In the time preceding the game, rumors surfaced that Parcells would seek a coaching job elsewhere with more say in personnel decisions than he had under Patriots owner Robert Kraft. In the 1996 NFL draft, Parcells had wanted to select a defender with the Patriots' seventh overall pick, but Kraft and personnel director Bobby Grier wanted wide receiver Terry Glenn instead, who was drafted.

After the Super Bowl, Parcells resigned from the Patriots, prompting Kraft to believe the Jets had been tampering with Parcells in an attempt for him to resign and take the Jets' vacant head coaching position and have say in the Jets' first overall selection in the 1997 NFL draft. The Jets decided that since Parcells couldn't be their head coach in 1997 because of his contract renegotiation, they would hire Parcells as a consultant and have Bill Belichick, who followed Parcells from the Patriots, hold the title of head coach. Kraft, who was requesting a first-round pick in return for allowing Parcells to coach elsewhere, called the Jets' agreement "a transparent farce" that "demonstrated it was the Jets' intention all along for Bill Parcells to become head coach of the Jets for the '97 season." Despite Parcells claiming the Jets had been given league permission for the consulting agreement, the NFL denied any permission was given, instead having commissioner Paul Tagliabue arrange an agreement between the two sides. The Patriots received third and fourth-round picks in the 1997 NFL Draft, a second-round pick in the 1998 NFL draft, and a first-round pick in the 1999 NFL draft in compensation for allowing Parcells to become the Jets' head coach.

With Parcells leaving for the Jets, the Patriots hired 49ers defensive coordinator Pete Carroll, who had been Jets head coach in 1994.

For the first time in over ten years the Patriots and Jets were locked in a serious fight for the AFC East division title. The two teams met in Foxboro on September 14. The game lead tied or changed seven times as both quarterbacks put up strong numbers but also costly errors — Neil O'Donnell was sacked seven times and fumbled three times, while on the Patriots side Drew Bledsoe threw two interceptions, one returned by Mo Lewis for a touchdown. With the game tied at 24, Jets kicker John Hall had a field goal blocked with 16 seconds remaining in regulation. Adam Vinatieri's 34-yard kick then won the game for the Patriots, 27–24, in overtime. From there, however, both teams struggled. The Patriots thus finished 10–6, while the Jets finished 9–7.

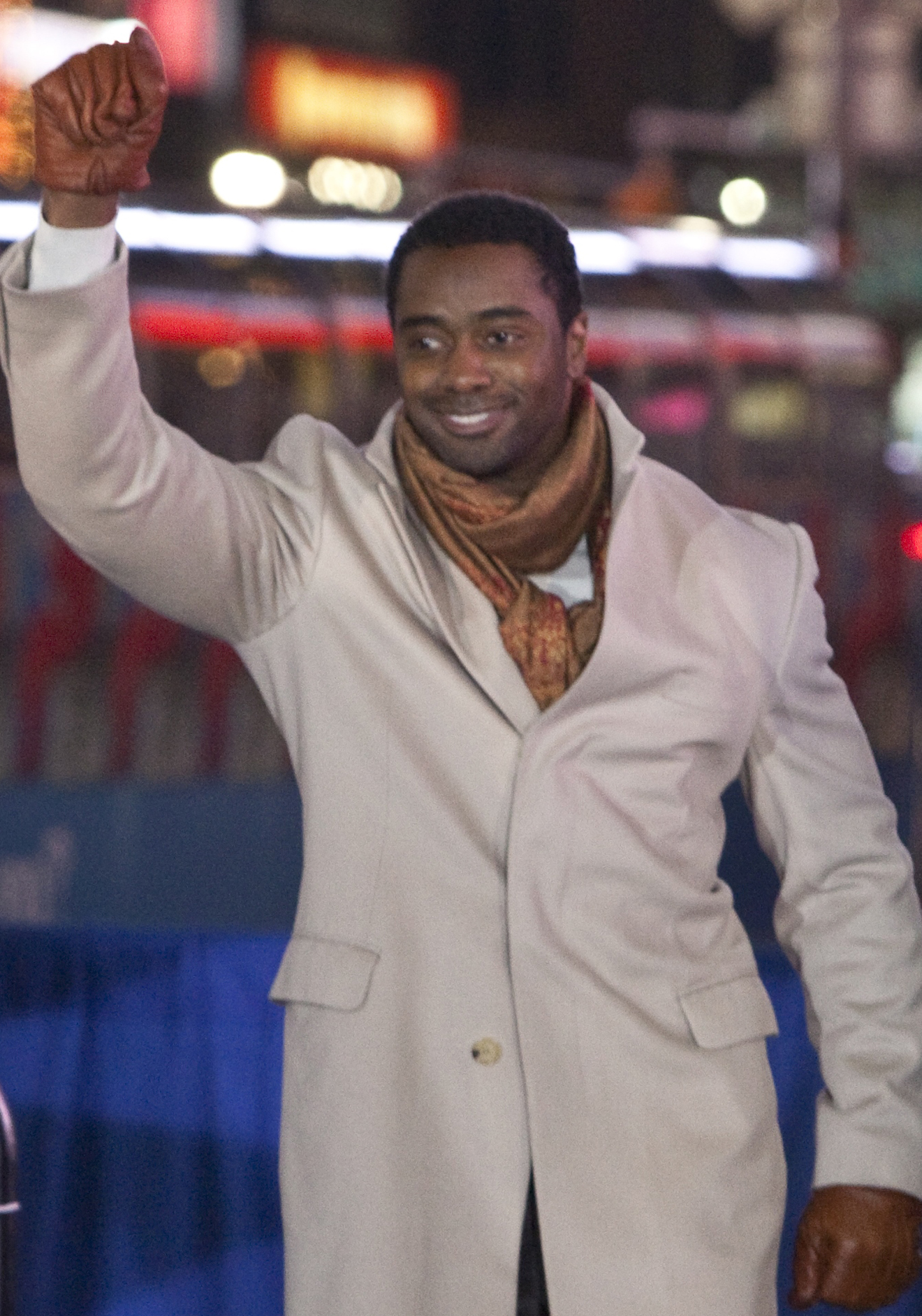
Curtis Martin, a Hall of Fame running back, was drafted by the New England Patriots, where he played for three seasons before spending the remainder of his career with the New York Jets for nine years.

After his third season in New England, running back Curtis Martin, the 1995 Rookie of the Year, became a restricted free agent. The Patriots placed the highest possible tender on Martin, that would ensure a first-round and third-round draft pick compensation if they did not match a contract offer from another team. The Jets offered Martin a 6-year, $36 million contract, and the Patriots, low on salary cap space, opted to not match the offer and took the draft pick compensation. The Jets offer was the first example under the NFL's current Free Agency system of the "poison pill." It included a clause that would have allowed Martin could become an unrestricted free agent the following season if the Patriots matched the offer, allowing him to leave New England without the Patriots receiving any compensation. The deal included a $3.3 million roster bonus that would have counted against the Patriots' salary cap. This was the first of many "poison pills" in free agent contracts before the process was outlawed in 2011.

The Jets, with Martin, former Patriots fullback Keith Byars, and new quarterback Vinny Testaverde, lost three of their first five games before defeating the 4–1 Patriots in Week 6. From there the Jets surged to their greatest season ever, winning 9 of their final 10 games including a 31–10 blowout win over the Patriots in the season finale.

Both teams made the playoffs. The Patriots lost to the Jacksonville Jaguars in the AFC Wild Card round. The Jets defeated Jacksonville in the AFC Divisional round but lost to the Denver Broncos in the AFC Championship.

The Jets and Patriots opened the 1999 season in Giants Stadium and the ensuing game became a ferocious affair. Vinny Testaverde tore his left achilles and was replaced by former Patriots punter Tom Tupa, who threw touchdowns to Keyshawn Johnson and Fred Baxter. Trailing 16–10 at halftime the Patriots scored 17 third quarter points, but the Baxter score and a Bryan Cox touchdown off an interception put the Jets in the lead, 28–27. Parcells twice called for two-point conversions and they failed; he then put in emergency quarterback Rick Mirer in the game's final three minutes, and a Mirer pass was deflected by Chris Slade and recovered by Ty Law, setting up the game-winning Adam Vinatieri field goal with seven seconds left.

The Patriots stormed to a 6–2 record, beating the Jets, Indianapolis, the NY Giants, Cleveland, Denver, and Arizona, while the Jets sleepwalked to 2–6, beating only Denver and Arizona. But in the rematch in November the Jets roared to a 24–3 lead and sweated out two fourth quarter Bledsoe touchdowns for the win, and from there both teams went in opposite directions, the Jets slumping to 4–8 and then winning their final four games to finish 8–8, while the Patriots collapsed to 8–8. The season finale for both teams ended in wins, the Patriots defeating the Baltimore Ravens while the Jets, in Parcells' final game as coach, defeated the same Seattle Seahawks against which he'd inaugurated his tenure as Jets coach.

=== 2000–2019: Belichick and Brady ===
A day after the 1999 season, Parcells resigned as head coach of the Jets and made his second retirement from NFL coaching. Belichick, who had been assistant head coach of the Jets, became the Jets' next head coach. The following day, at a press conference for his hiring, Belichick wrote a resignation note on a napkin ("I resign as HC of the NYJ."), and proceeded to instead announce his resignation in front of the press. Despite rumors that he had been offered the Patriots' vacant head coaching position, Belichick cited the Jets' uncertain ownership situation following the death of owner Leon Hess earlier that year as the reason for his resignation. The Jets denied Belichick permission to speak with other teams, and as had happened in 1997 with Parcells, the NFL upheld Belichick's contractual obligations to the Jets. Belichick then filed an antitrust lawsuit against the NFL in federal court. After Parcells and Kraft, talking for the first time since Parcells' resignation from the Patriots, agreed to settle their differences, the Patriots and Jets agreed to a compensation package to allow Belichick to become the Patriots' head coach. With the deal, the Patriots sent their first-round pick in the 2000 NFL draft and fourth and seventh-round picks in the 2001 NFL draft to the Jets, while also receiving the Jets' fifth-round selection in 2001 and seventh-round pick in the 2002 NFL draft.

On September 23, 2001, Patriots quarterback Drew Bledsoe was injured on a hit by Mo Lewis. Bledsoe was replaced by backup Tom Brady, but it was not enough to overcome a 10–3 Jets win. From there, however, the Patriots surged forward, and both teams met on December 2, with both teams in playoff contention. The Jets opened a 13–3 halftime lead, but were shot down by touchdowns by Antowain Smith and a Brady pass to Marc Edwards en route to a 17–16 win. The Patriots did not lose the rest of the season as they won Super Bowl XXXVI, while the Jets finished 10–6 losing in the Wild Card round of the playoffs.

On December 22, 2002, the Jets defeated the Patriots 30–17 in a key Week 16 contest to move both teams to 8–7, one game behind the AFC East-leading Miami Dolphins. In Week 17, The Patriots defeated the Dolphins, 27–24, while the Jets defeated the Packers, 42–17. The Jets would win the division on a tie-breaker over the Patriots and Dolphins, as the Patriots would miss the playoffs.

On October 24, 2004, the Patriots defeated the Jets, 13–7, to hand New York their first loss after a 5–0 start. Both teams would make the playoffs that year, and the Patriots would go on to win Super Bowl XXXIX, their third title in four seasons.

==== 2006–2008: Belichick vs. Mangini ====
In 2006, the Jets hired former Patriots defensive coordinator Eric Mangini as their new head coach.

During Week 2 of the 2006 season, Mangini referred to Belichick as "a friend" in press conferences, while Belichick refused to use Mangini's name with the media. Earlier in the week, the Patriots had traded hold-out wide receiver Deion Branch to the Seattle Seahawks and filed tampering charges against the Jets for allegedly engaging in contract talks with Branch while he was still a member of the Patriots. The Jets were later cleared of the charges by the NFL. The Patriots went on to defeat the Jets in New York, but in November, the Jets handed the Patriots a loss in New England. The post-game on-field meeting between the two in both games was a topic of discussion, with some claiming their handshakes were intentionally cold and unfriendly. Following the loss the Patriots re-sodded Gillette Stadium's deteriorated grass surface with Field Turf. The Patriots ran away 37–16 in a playoff win over the Jets on the new surface, and following the game Belichick shoved Boston Globe photographer Jim Davis before reaching Mangini and hugging his former assistant.

When the Patriots and Jets met again in the first week of the 2007 season, the Patriots won 38–14. The game was highlighted by the first touchdown catches by new Patriots receivers Randy Moss and Wes Welker, and a 108-yard Ellis Hobbs kickoff return for a touchdown, setting an NFL record for the longest kickoff return.

After the game, Belichick was accused by the Jets of authorizing his staff to film the Jets' defensive signals from an on-field location, a violation of league rules. The Jets filed a complaint to the league office, detailing the accusations. Two days later, Belichick issued a statement "to apologize to everyone who has been affected;" he also stated that he had spoken with NFL commissioner Roger Goodell about his "interpretation of the rule." On September 13, Belichick was personally fined $500,000, and the team was fined $250,000. Additionally, the Patriots were required to forfeit their first-round pick in the 2008 NFL draft.

Accusations of Jets also illegally videotaping the Patriots in their January 2007 playoff match-up arose following the incident. Jets general manager Mike Tannenbaum called the accusations "completely false" in September 2007. In the week before the teams' December 16, 2007 game, Newsday reported the Jets were found videotaping from the mezzanine level of Gillette Stadium and asked to leave by Patriots security. The Jets later claimed they had been granted permission by the Patriots to film in the game, while Belichick denied permission was ever given.

The season rematch in Gillette Stadium took place on a windy, rain-soaked day that kept scoring down; the Patriots nonetheless triumphed, 20–10, the 14th consecutive win on their quest for a perfect season. This perfect season would go until that year's Super Bowl, where the New York Giants would defeat the Patriots 17–14.

The two teams next met on September 14, 2008, but the game's dynamic changed the week before when Tom Brady was knocked out for the season with a torn ACL. Backup Matt Cassel took over for Brady, and after leading the Patriots to a 17–10 win over the Chiefs, Cassel made his first NFL start. Cassel was 16 of 23 for 165 yards with no touchdowns or turnovers; a Sammy Morris rushing touchdown and four Stephen Gostkowski field goals led the Patriots to a 19–10 win as newly acquired Jets quarterback Brett Favre went 18 of 26 for 181 yards and a touchdown but threw a costly interception to Brandon Meriweather, setting up Morris' score.

In the rematch on November 13, The Jets rushed to a 24–6 lead with five minutes to go in the second quarter. They added a touchdown by Thomas Jones in the fourth. Still, Matt Cassel exploded into a virtual one-man offense, throwing for 400 yards and three touchdowns with no interceptions while rushing for 64 yards. He threw touchdowns to Jabar Gaffney with fifteen seconds left in the first half, to Benjamin Watson on the final play of the third quarter (and a two-point conversion to Gaffney), and to Randy Moss with one second left to force overtime. But the Jets drove down field in overtime, escaping a third-and-fifteen deep in their territory before Jay Feely's 34-yard game-winning field goal and a 34–31 Jets final. The game was New England's first overtime loss since the 2000 season against the Bills, while the win was the fourth in seven career meetings against the Patriots (his first win in his second meeting as Jets quarterback) by Favre.

The Jets' win, though, did not help them in the homestretch of the season, for the Patriots won five of their last six games while the Jets lost four of their final six games. Both teams faced a do-or-die scenario on December 28; the Patriots traveled to Buffalo needing a win and a Jets win over Miami to win the division; the Jets hosted the Dolphins needing a win and outside help to win the division or secure a Wild Card. The Jets, however, lost their final game and were shut out of the playoffs and subsequently fired Mangini.

==== 2009–2014: Belichick vs. Ryan ====
The Patriots visited the Jets on September 20, 2009, the first match-up between Belichick and new Jets head coach, former Baltimore Ravens defensive coordinator Rex Ryan. In the week prior to the game, Ryan placed a phone message to all Jets season ticket holders asking them to "make it miserable for (Tom) Brady and company", following up on his comments during the offseason that he would not "kiss Bill Belichick's Super Bowl rings." He told the Jets fans that "the Patriots had a better head coach and a better quarterback", but that the game would decide "who has a better team." Meanwhile, Jets safety Kerry Rhodes said the Jets intended on not just winning, but "embarrassing" the Patriots in the game, while nose tackle Kris Jenkins called it the Jets' version of the Super Bowl; the Jets had not defeated the Patriots at home since 2000. In the end, the Jets defeated the Patriots, 16–9, in the 100th overall meeting of the rivalry series.

The Patriots hosted the Jets on November 22. Jets rookie quarterback Mark Sanchez threw four interceptions, three of them to Leigh Bodden. Randy Moss caught a four-yard touchdown in the face of Jets cornerback Darrelle Revis, who'd been talkative about matching up with Moss; Revis, nonetheless, held Moss to 34 yards over two games with the interception in the September meeting. Wes Welker, had 15 catches (one short of Troy Brown's 2002 club record) for 197 yards.

On December 6, 2010, the teams met on Monday Night Football. Both teams had 9–2 records, which gave the game the sense of a playoff game; the Jets, however, never got on track, as Nick Folk missed a 53-yard field goal attempt in the first quarter. Brady found Deion Branch and Brandon Tate for touchdowns and BenJarvus Green-Ellis ran in a one-yard score, leaving the Patriots up 24–3 at the half; from there on the Jets tried to run the ball (five Jets backs combined for 152 rushing yards) while Sanchez was intercepted three times. Brady touchdowns to Welker and Aaron Hernandez and a second Green-Ellis score finished up a 45–3 rout of the Jets, the biggest for the Patriots against the Jets since 2002. Patriots running back Danny Woodhead, cut by the Jets before the season, caught four passes for 104 yards against his former team.

The 11–5 Jets and 14–2 Patriots were slotted into a Divisional Round playoff game in Foxboro, after the Jets won their Wild Card game against the Indianapolis Colts. Before their playoff matchup, the Jets' Antonio Cromartie called Tom Brady "an asshole", claiming that he pointed at the Jets' sideline after throwing a touchdown pass during the Patriots' 45–3 win. The Jets won the Divisional Round game, 28–21. After the game, the Patriots' Deion Branch called the Jets post-game celebrations "classless".

On November 22, 2012, the teams met on Thanksgiving for the first time. The Patriots won by a score of 49–19. The Patriots forced five turnovers, the most bizarre of which became known as the "butt fumble", in which Sanchez ran into the backside of lineman Brandon Moore, dislodging the ball, which was recovered by Steve Gregory, who ran back a 32-yard touchdown. This was during a sequence when the Patriots scored three touchdowns in just 52 seconds. The Patriots tied the NFL record for most points in a single quarter (35) and the win was Bill Belichick's 200th career NFL win as a head coach.

On September 12, 2013, during a 13–10 Patriots win, the bitterness of the rivalry spilled into a sideline brawl following an interception of Geno Smith by Aqib Talib; the brawl led to the ejection of Nick Mangold and D'Brickashaw Ferguson.

Former Jets star cornerback Darrelle Revis signed with the Patriots in the 2014 offseason, giving New England a lift to their defense and secondary. Rex Ryan was quoted as being "sick to his stomach" seeing Revis in a Patriots uniform. The first meeting of the season came on October 16, with the Patriots hosting the Jets on Thursday Night Football. Despite being 1–5, the Jets battled closely with the 4–2 Patriots, nearly completing a come from behind victory, but a 58-yard field goal that would have given the Jets the lead in the game's final seconds was blocked. The Patriots hung on for a 27–25 win.

==== 2015–2019: Bowles and Gase ====
Todd Bowles replaced Rex Ryan for the 2015 season. The two teams met in Foxboro on October 23, 2015, the Jets were 4–1 entering this game and the Patriots were 5–0. There were five ties or lead changes in the first three quarters as the Jets built a 20–16 lead, but in the fourth quarter, Tom Brady led two drives ending in touchdowns to Danny Amendola and Rob Gronkowski. The Jets kicked a field goal with 18 seconds to go and recovered the ensuing onside kick, but could not score again, resulting in a 30–23 New England win.

On December 27 at MetLife Stadium, the 9-5 Jets needed the win to remain in the playoff hunt while the Patriots at 12–2 were in position for the AFC's top playoff seed. The Jets led 20–13 in the fourth before Brady found James White for the tying touchdown just after the two-minute warning. The game went to overtime where Bill Belichick deferred to the Jets; the Jets responded as Ryan Fitzpatrick completed two passes (to Quincy Enunwa and Brandon Marshall) for 68 yards and then Eric Decker caught the game-winning touchdown.

On October 15, 2017, the Patriots and Jets were tied with the Bills for the division lead at 3–2, with the Jets-Patriots game determining who would lead the division in Week 6. The Jets took an early 14–0 lead, but the Patriots rallied to win 24–17. The game featured a controversial call in which Jets tight end Austin Seferian-Jenkins appeared to have scored a touchdown on a 5-yard reception from Josh McCown. The play was ruled a fumble because after Seferian-Jenkins caught the ball, he bobbled it before crossing the goal line, going out of bounds before he could secure it, which resulted in a touchback. With the win, Tom Brady got his 187th career regular season win, passing Peyton Manning and Brett Favre for the most regular season wins in NFL history by a starting quarterback.

On December 30, 2018, the Patriots achieved their 500th regular season victory defeating the Jets, 38 to 3, making the Patriots the first AFL franchise to achieve this milestone.

Adam Gase was hired as the new head coach for the New York Jets for the 2019 NFL season. The first meeting between the Patriots and the Jets of the season was on September 22, 2019. The Patriots won this game in Foxboro where Jets third-string quarterback, Luke Falk, made his first career start. In their second and final match up of the season, both teams played in MetLife Stadium on Monday Night Football. The Jets were coming from their first victory of the season against the Cowboys and the Patriots were 6–0 prior to the game. This game is infamously known as the "Ghost Game", as Jets quarterback Sam Darnold was caught saying on mic "I think I'm seeing ghosts" in response to an interception he threw. The Jets lost the game 33–0 as Darnold threw for 4 interceptions and only 86 passing yards.

On March 21, 2020, Brady left the Patriots as a free agent and joined the Tampa Bay Buccaneers. Brady posted a 29–7 record against the Jets.

=== 2020–present: Post-Brady ===
With new quarterback Cam Newton the Patriots struggled to 2–5 but the Jets faltered more starting 0–8 when the two teams faced each other on November 9, 2020, on Monday Night Football. The Jets led 27–17 but Newton led the Patriots on three scoring drives ending with the game-winning field goal by former Jet Nick Folk. The dominance continued in 2021 with New England sweeping the season series and re-writing history with a 54–13 thrashing of the Jets at Gillette Stadium on October 24, 2021. Patriots Quarterback Mac Jones set the pace as the Jets allowed more than 50 points in a game for the first time since 1995. In the Week 18 matchup of the 2023 season, the Jets defeated the Patriots 17–3, beating New England for the first time since Week 16 of the 2015 season. More significantly, they won what turned out to be their last match ever against the Bill Belichick-led Patriots, as Belichick would part ways with the Patriots just four days later.

== Season-by-season results ==
New York Titans/Jets vs. Boston/New England Patriots Season-by-Season Results
1960s (Jets, 12–7–1)

Season	Season series	at New York Titans/Jets	at Boston Patriots	Overall series	Notes
1960	Patriots 2–0	Patriots; 28–24	Patriots; 38–21	Patriots; 2–0	Inaugural season for both franchises and the American Football League (AFL). Both teams are placed in the Eastern Division, becoming divisional rivals. In New York, Patriots overcame a 24–7 third quarter deficit.
1961	Titans 2–0	Titans; 37–30	Titans; 21–20	Tie; 2–2	
1962	Patriots 2–0	Patriots; 43–13	Patriots; 24–17	Patriots; 4–2	
1963	Tie 1–1	Jets; 31–24	Patriots; 38–14	Patriots; 5–3	Titans change their name to "Jets."; Patriots move to Fenway Park. Last matchup at Polo Grounds. Patriots lose 1963 AFL Championship.
1964	Tie 1–1	Jets; 35–14	Patriots; 26–10	Patriots; 6–4	Jets move to Shea Stadium.
1965	Tie 1–1	Patriots; 27–23	Jets; 30–20	Patriots; 7–5	
1966	Jets 1–0–1	Jets; 38–28	Tie; 24–24	Patriots; 7–6–1	
1967	Jets 2–0	Jets; 30–23	Jets; 29–24	Jets; 8–7–1	
1968	Jets 2–0	Jets; 48–14	Jets; 47–31	Jets; 10–7–1	Last matchup at Fenway Park. In New York, Jets score their most points in a game against the Patriots and cause 8 Patriots turnovers, setting a Patriots' franchise record for most turnovers in a game. Jets win 1968 AFL Championship, win Super Bowl III.
1969	Jets 2–0	Jets; 23–17	Jets; 23–14	Jets; 12–7–1	Patriots temporarily play at Alumni Stadium.

1970s (Jets, 12–8)

Season	Season series	at New York Jets	at Boston/New England Patriots	Overall series	Notes
1970	Jets 2–0	Jets; 17–3	Jets; 31–21	Jets; 14–7–1	As a result of the AFL–NFL merger, Jets and Patriots are placed in the AFC East. Patriots temporarily play at Harvard Stadium. Jets win nine straight meetings (1966–1970).
1971	Tie 1–1	Jets; 13–6	Patriots; 20–0	Jets; 15–8–1	Patriots open Schaefer Stadium (now known as Foxboro Stadium) and change their name to "New England Patriots".
1972	Jets 2–0	Jets; 34–10	Jets; 41–13	Jets; 17–8–1	In New England, Jets finish with 333 rushing yards, setting a franchise record for their most rushing yards in a game.
1973	Jets 2–0	Jets; 33–13	Jets; 9–7	Jets; 19–8–1	In New York, Patriots tie their most turnovers in a game with 8. Jets win eight straight home games (1966–1973).
1974	Tie 1–1	Patriots; 24–0	Jets; 21–16	Jets; 20–9–1	
1975	Jets 2–0	Jets; 36–7	Jets; 30–28	Jets; 22–9–1	
1976	Patriots 2–0	Patriots; 38–24	Patriots; 41–7	Jets; 22–11–1	In New York, Patriots force 10 Jets turnovers, setting a Jets' franchise record for most turnovers in a game. Patriots sweep the Jets in the season series for the first time since the 1962 season.
1977	Tie 1–1	Jets; 30–27	Patriots; 24–13	Jets; 23–12–1	
1978	Patriots 2–0	Patriots; 19–17	Patriots; 55–21	Jets; 23–14–1	
1979	Tie 1–1	Jets; 27–26	Patriots; 56–3	Jets; 24–15–1	In New England, Patriots record their largest victory over the Jets with a 53–point differential, score their most points in a game against the Jets, and set a franchise record for their largest victory overall (broken in 2009). Meanwhile, the Jets set a franchise record for their worst loss overall and most points allowed in a game.

1980s (Patriots, 12–8)

Season	Season series	at New York Jets	at New England Patriots	Overall series	Notes
1980	Patriots 2–0	Patriots; 21–11	Patriots; 34–21	Jets; 24–17–1	
1981	Jets 2–0	Jets; 28–24	Jets; 17–6	Jets; 26–17–1	
1982	Jets 1–0	no game	Jets; 31–7	Jets; 27–17–1	Due to the 1982 NFL Players' strike, the game scheduled in New York was canceled.
1983	Tie 1–1	Jets; 26–3	Patriots; 23–13	Jets; 28–18–1	Last meeting at Shea Stadium.
1984	Patriots 2–0	Patriots; 28–21	Patriots; 30–20	Jets; 28–20–1	Jets move to Giants Stadium. In New England, Patriots overcame a 20–3 deficit.
1985	Tie 1–1	Jets; 16–13 (OT)	Patriots; 20–13	Jets; 29–21–1	Both teams finish with 11–5 records, but the Jets clinched the better playoff seed based on having a better conference record, setting up a playoff meeting at New York.
1985 playoffs	Patriots 1–0	Patriots 26–14	—N/a	Jets 29–22–1	AFC Wild Card Round. Patriots became the first team to reach the Super Bowl by winning three away playoff games in the same year. Patriots go on to lose Super Bowl XX.
1986	Tie 1–1	Patriots; 20–6	Jets; 31–24	Jets; 30–23–1	
1987	Tie 1–1	Jets; 43–24	Patriots; 42–20	Jets; 31–24–1	
1988	Patriots 2–0	Patriots; 14–13	Patriots; 28–3	Jets; 31–26–1	
1989	Tie 1–1	Patriots; 27–24	Jets; 27–26	Jets; 32–27–1	

1990s (Jets, 11–9)

Season	Season series	at New York Jets	at New England Patriots	Overall series	Notes
1990	Jets 2–0	Jets; 42–7	Jets; 37–13	Jets; 34–27–1	
1991	Tie 1–1	Patriots; 6–3	Jets; 28–21	Jets; 35–28–1	
1992	Tie 1–1	Jets; 30–21	Patriots; 24–3	Jets; 36–29–1	Patriots' win is their only home win in the 1992 season.
1993	Jets 2–0	Jets; 45–7	Jets; 6–0	Jets; 38–29–1	In New York, Jets record their largest victory over the Patriots with a 38–point differential.
1994	Tie 1–1	Jets; 24–17	Patriots; 24–13	Jets; 39–30–1	
1995	Patriots 2–0	Patriots; 20–7	Patriots; 31–28	Jets; 39–32–1	Starting with their home loss, the Jets went on a 12-game home losing streak.
1996	Patriots 2–0	Patriots; 31–27	Patriots; 34–10	Jets; 39–34–1	In New York, Patriots overcame a 21–0 deficit. The 21-point blown lead tied a Jets franchise record for biggest blown lead. Patriots lose Super Bowl XXXI.
1997	Tie 1–1	Jets; 24–19	Patriots; 27–24 (OT)	Jets; 40–35–1	
1998	Jets 2–0	Jets; 31–10	Jets; 24–14	Jets; 42–35–1	
1999	Tie 1–1	Patriots; 30–28	Jets; 24–17	Jets; 43–36–1	

2000s (Patriots, 14–7)

Season	Season series	at New York Jets	at New England Patriots	Overall series	Notes
2000	Jets 2–0	Jets; 20–19	Jets; 34–17	Jets; 45–36–1	Most recent season in which the Jets swept the Patriots in the season series.
2001	Tie 1–1	Patriots; 17–16	Jets; 10–3	Jets; 46–37–1	Game in New England was the first game played by any NFL team since the September 11 attacks. During the game, Jets' LB Mo Lewis injured Patriots' QB Drew Bledsoe, causing QB Tom Brady to take over for the remainder of the season. Patriots win Super Bowl XXXVI.
2002	Tie 1–1	Patriots; 44–7	Jets; 30–17	Jets; 47–38–1	Patriots open Gillette Stadium. Both teams finish with 9–7 records, but the Jets clinched the AFC East based on a better record against common opponents, while the Patriots were eliminated from playoff contention on tiebreakers with the Cleveland Browns.
2003	Patriots 2–0	Patriots; 21–16	Patriots; 23–16	Jets; 47–40–1	Patriots win Super Bowl XXXVIII.
2004	Patriots 2–0	Patriots; 23–7	Patriots; 13–7	Jets; 47–42–1	Patriots win Super Bowl XXXIX.
2005	Patriots 2–0	Patriots; 31–21	Patriots; 16–3	Jets; 47–44–1	
2006	Tie 1–1	Patriots; 24–17	Jets; 17–14	Jets; 48–45–1	Following their loss, the Patriots went on a 15-game home winning streak.
2006 playoffs	Patriots 1–0	—N/a	Patriots 37–16	Jets 48–46–1	AFC Wild Card Round.
2007	Patriots 2–0	Patriots; 38–14	Patriots; 20–10	Tie; 48–48–1	Following the game in New York, Patriots HC Bill Belichick was accused by the Jets of authorizing his staff to film the Jets' defensive signals from an on-field location, a violation of league rules in what became known as "Spygate". Patriots complete first 16–0 season in NFL history, but lose Super Bowl XLII.
2008	Tie 1–1	Patriots; 19–10	Jets; 34–31 (OT)	Tie; 49–49–1	Patriots win eight straight road meetings. (2001–2008).
2009	Tie 1–1	Jets; 16–9	Patriots; 31–14	Tie; 50–50–1	Last meeting at Giants Stadium.

2010s (Patriots, 17–4)

Season	Season series	at New York Jets	at New England Patriots	Overall series	Notes
2010	Tie 1–1	Jets; 28–14	Patriots; 45–3	Tie; 51–51–1	Jets open New Meadowlands Stadium (now known as MetLife Stadium).
2010 playoffs	Jets 1–0	—N/a	Jets 28–21	Jets 52–51–1	AFC Divisional Round. As of the 2026 season, the most recent Jets playoff win.
2011	Patriots 2–0	Patriots; 37–16	Patriots; 30–21	Patriots; 53–52–1	Patriots lose Super Bowl XLVI.
2012	Patriots 2–0	Patriots; 49–19	Patriots; 29–26 (OT)	Patriots; 55–52–1	Game in New York was played on Thanksgiving and included a memorable moment when Jets' QB Mark Sanchez collided with OG Brandon Moore, resulting in a fumble that became famously known as the "butt fumble".
2013	Tie 1–1	Jets; 30–27 (OT)	Patriots; 13–10	Patriots; 56–53–1	Starting with their win, the Patriots went on a 16-game home winning streak.
2014	Patriots 2–0	Patriots; 17–16	Patriots; 27–25	Patriots; 58–53–1	Patriots win Super Bowl XLIX.
2015	Tie 1–1	Jets; 26–20 (OT)	Patriots; 30–23	Patriots; 59–54–1	Jets' overtime win comes on their opening drive after Patriots elect to kick off after winning the OT coin toss.
2016	Patriots 2–0	Patriots; 22–17	Patriots; 41–3	Patriots; 61–54–1	Patriots win Super Bowl LI.
2017	Patriots 2–0	Patriots; 24–17	Patriots; 26–6	Patriots; 63–54–1	Patriots lose Super Bowl LII.
2018	Patriots 2–0	Patriots; 27–13	Patriots; 38–3	Patriots; 65–54–1	Patriots win Super Bowl LIII.
2019	Patriots 2–0	Patriots; 33–0	Patriots; 30–14	Patriots; 67–54–1	

2020s (Patriots, 11–2)

Season	Season series	at New York Jets	at New England Patriots	Overall series	Notes
2020	Patriots 2–0	Patriots; 30–27	Patriots; 28–14	Patriots; 69–54–1	
2021	Patriots 2–0	Patriots; 25–6	Patriots; 54–13	Patriots; 71–54–1	
2022	Patriots 2–0	Patriots; 22–17	Patriots; 10–3	Patriots; 73–54–1	Patriots win 12 straight home meetings (2011–2022).
2023	Tie 1–1	Patriots; 15–10	Jets; 17–3	Patriots; 74–55–1	Patriots win 15 straight meetings and 8 straight away meetings (2016–2023). Jets won in New England for the first time since the 2010 playoffs, in what would also be Bill Belichick's final game as head coach of the Patriots.
2024	Tie 1–1	Jets; 24–3	Patriots; 25–22	Patriots; 75–56–1	
2025	Patriots 2–0	Patriots; 42–10	Patriots; 27–14	Patriots; 77–56–1	In New York, the Patriots clinched the AFC East title with their win, combined with the Bills' loss to the Eagles. Patriots lose Super Bowl LX.
2026		December 27	Patriots; 26–19	Patriots; 78–56–1	

Summary of Results

Season	Season series	at New York Titans/Jets	at Boston/New England Patriots	Notes
AFL regular season	Jets 12–7–1	Jets 7–3	Jets 5–4–1	
NFL regular season	Patriots 69–43	Patriots 32–23	Patriots 37–20	
AFL and NFL regular season	Patriots 76–55–1	Patriots 35–30	Patriots 41–25–1	
NFL postseason	Patriots 2–1	Patriots 1–0	Tie 1–1	AFC Wild Card Round: 1985, 2006; AFC Divisional Round: 2010
Regular and postseason	Patriots 78–56–1	Patriots 36–30	Patriots 42–26–1	

== Connections between the two teams ==
With Parcells, Carroll, Belichick, and Mangini all acting as coaches on both teams from 1993 through 2008, at least 50 players were also with both teams in the same period. Pepper Johnson was a player with the Jets under Parcells and served as a defensive line coach for the Patriots under Belichick and in 2015 serves in that capacity for the Jets. Upon becoming Jets head coach in 2006, Mangini hired former Jets and Patriots players Bryan Cox and Rick Lyle to his coaching staff, as well as former Patriot Sam Gash, and retained former Patriots assistant strength and conditioning coach Markus Paul. Former Patriots wide receivers coach Brian Daboll spent seven seasons with the Patriots before leaving to become the Jets' quarterbacks coach in 2007 and in 2013 returned to the Patriots, becoming tight ends coach in 2014. When Daboll left with Mangini for the Cleveland Browns, former Patriots quarterback Matt Cavanaugh was named as Jets quarterbacks coach; ironically, in his playing days with the Patriots, Cavanaugh was 0–2 against the Jets. Corwin Brown worked on the Patriots staff in the 2010 season.

Name	Pos.	Years with Jets	Years with Patriots
Chris Baker	TE	2002–08	2009
Fred Baxter	TE	1993–2000	2002–03
Braxton Berrios	WR	2019–2022	2018
Kyle Brady	TE	1995–98	2007
Corwin Brown	S	1997–98	1993–96
Kareem Brown	DL	2007–08	2007
Keith Byars	FB/TE	1998	1996–97
Matt Chatham	LB	2006–2007	2000–05
Anthony Clement	OT	2006–2007	2008
Bryan Cox	LB	1998–2000	2001
Steve DeOssie	LS	1993	1994–95
Tim Dwight	WR	2006	2005
Shaun Ellis	DE	2000–10	2011
Nick Folk	K	2010–16, 2025	2019–22
Barry Gardner	LB	2005	2006
Mike Gisler	OL	1998–99	1993–97
Victor Green	DB	1993–2001	2002
Bobby Hamilton	DE	1996–99, 2006	2000–03
David Harris	LB	2007–2016	2017
Chris Hayes	S	1997–2001	2002
Chris Hogan	WR	2020	2016–18
Rob Holmberg	LB	1998	2000–01
James Ihedigbo	S	2007–2010	2011
Larry Izzo	LB	2009	2001–08
Olrick Johnson	LB	1999	2000
Kliff Kingsbury	QB	2005	2003
Ty Law	CB	2005, 2008	1995–2004
Courtney Ledyard	LB	2000	2003
Rick Lyle	DL	1997–2001	2002–03
Omare Lowe	CB	2003	2004
Ray Lucas	QB/WR	1998–2000	1996–97
Curtis Martin	RB	1998–2005	1995–97
Steve Martin	DT	2001	2002
Dave Meggett	RB	1998	1995–97
Ray Mickens	CB	1996–2003	2006
Donte Moncrief	WR	2020	2020
Rashad Moore	DT	2006	2007
Earthwind Moreland	CB	2000	2004
Leonard Myers	CB	2003	2001–02
Kevin O'Connell	QB	2009–2010	2008
Roman Phifer	LB	1999–2000	2001–04
Anthony Pleasant	DE	1998–99	2001–03
Jason Pociask	TE	2006–07	2008
Hank Poteat	CB	2006–2008	2004–06
Darrelle Revis	CB	2007–2012, 2015–2016	2014
Stevan Ridley	RB	2015	2011–2014
James Robinson	RB	2022	2023
Otis Smith	CB	1995–96, 1997–99	1996, 2000–02
Zach Sudfeld	TE	2013	2013
Vinny Testaverde	QB	1998–2003, 2005	2006
Demaryius Thomas	WR	2019	2019
Tom Tupa	P	1999–2001	1996–98
Dedric Ward	WR	1997–2000	2003
Jermaine Wiggins	TE	2000	2000–01
Damien Woody	OL	2008–11	1999–2003
Danny Woodhead	RB	2008–10	2010–2012

Connections between the two teams predated the Parcells and Belichick eras. Mike Holovak coached the then-Boston Patriots 1961–68, going 5–10–1 against the Jets; he joined the Jets front office and in the 1976 season finale (a 42–3 rout by the Cincinnati Bengals) was named interim head coach, replacing Lou Holtz. Holovak was responsible for drafting players such as linebacker Greg Buttle, defensive lineman Joe Klecko of later New York Sack Exchange fame, and quarterback Richard Todd for the Jets, but he quit the organization after the 1977 draft because he'd been passed over for the head coaching job by Walt Michaels. Ironically, sixteen years later Holovak had to break up a fight between two assistant coaches as Houston Oilers GM, when the Oilers defeated the Jets in the 1993 season finale.

Mike Hickey was an assistant personnel director for the Patriots under Chuck Fairbanks before joining the Jets and running their drafts in the 1980s; Hickey has been criticized over the years for a number of personnel choices, none more controversial than his 1983 decision not to draft Dan Marino.

Dick Steinberg was general manager of the Patriots in the 1980s but was released with coach Raymond Berry after the 1989 season. Steinberg was hired as Jets GM for 1990, but he was blamed for poor draft picks, notably unproductive running back Blair Thomas and quarterback Browning Nagle, and for missing on drafting quarterback Brett Favre after he tried to swing a draft-day deal with the Phoenix Cardinals only to have the Cardinals back out at the last minute.

Ron Erhardt was a member of Chuck Fairbanks' staff with the Patriots in the 1970s, and was elevated to head coach 1979–81; his Patriots squads went 3–3 against the Jets, including a 56–3 massacre of the Jets in September 1979. In 1996, he was hired as Jets offensive coordinator before retiring from football after the 1997 season; he was a notable target of the wrath of Keyshawn Johnson in the rookie receiver's 1997 book Just Give Me The Damn Ball.

Connections during the Belichick-Mangini Era include family connections. Derrick Gaffney was a Jets wide receiver 1978–87; his son Jabar Gaffney was a Patriots WR from 2006 to 2008. Also, Joe Klecko was part of the Jets' famous New York Sack Exchange defensive line, while his son Dan Klecko was a reserve player on the Patriots' defensive line and also played fullback on goal line pushes in their Super Bowl dynasty.

The two teams share bitter rivalries with their divisional rivals Buffalo and Miami as well as with the Raiders and two former division rivals, the Colts and the former Houston Oilers. From time to time have needed or wanted help from each other in key games; in 2001 the Patriots needed a Jets victory over the Raiders in the season finale to lock up the AFC East while the Jets needed the win to secure a playoff berth; in 2002 the Jets needed a Patriots win over Miami to make the playoffs; in 2009 it was the Jets who ended the quest of Indianapolis for a perfect season two years after New England went 16–0. The two teams have also shared bitter playoff moments involving referee Ben Dreith; Dreith officiated New England's controversial 1976 playoff loss to the Oakland Raiders and also was referee in the Jets' 1986 playoff loss to the Cleveland Browns; he was criticized by Jets players defending teammate Mark Gastineau following his controversial hit on Browns quarterback Bernie Kosar.

As noted above, games between the two teams have often played out the rivalry between the New York Yankees and the Boston Red Sox in Major League Baseball. During games between the two teams, there are derogatory chants made at the Red Sox during games at the Meadowlands and at the Yankees during games in New England.

== See also ==
- List of NFL rivalries
- AFC East
- Giants–Patriots rivalry
- Red Sox–Yankees rivalry
- Celtics–Knicks rivalry
