= Robert L. Geddes =

American politician from Idaho

39th President pro tempore of the Idaho Senate
- In office 2000–2010
- Preceded by: Jerry Twiggs
- Succeeded by: Brent Hill

Member of the Idaho Senate
- In office 1995 – January 18, 2011
- Preceded by: Dennis Hansen
- Succeeded by: John Tippets
- Constituency: 32nd district (1995–2002); 31st district (2002–2011)

Personal details
- Born: November 14, 1955 (age 70) Preston, Idaho, U.S.
- Party: Republican
- Spouse: Tammy
- Education: Ricks College (AS); Utah State University (BS)

Robert L. Geddes (born November 14, 1955) is an American engineer and politician who served as a member of the Idaho Senate from 1995 to 2011 . He was a resident of Soda Springs. In 2011, Geddes resigned from the Idaho Senate to accept an appointment to the Idaho Tax Commission, where he served for one year. He later served as the director of the Idaho Department of Administration under Governor Butch Otter, retiring in 2018.

== Early life and education ==
Geddes is an Idaho native born in Preston and a graduate of Preston High School in 1974. Studying first at Ricks College, where earned an associate degree, he paused his studies to serve a two-year mission for the Church of Jesus Christ of Latter-day Saints in Austria. He later earned a Bachelor of Science in geology from Utah State University in 1981.

== Career ==
Working first for Conda Partnership from 1981 to 1985, Geddes spent the bulk of his career with Monsanto in Soda Springs as an environmental engineer from 1985 until 2011, taking a year-long leave of absence to serve on the Idaho State Tax Commission.

On January 18, 2011, Governor Butch Otter appointed him to be chairman of the Idaho State Tax Commission and Geddes immediately resigned his Senate seat. The Senate confirmed his nomination on February 4, 2011, by voice vote. Geddes served in that position until February 21, 2012, when he resigned and returned to Monsanto.

=== Idaho Senate ===
Governor Phil Batt appointed Senator Dennis Hansen in 1995 to the Idaho Public Utilities Commission, creating a vacancy in the Senate for the 31st district, to which he later appointed Geddes. Geddes' father, Robert C. Geddes, was a state representative for 33 years, representing the same district. They served concurrently in the legislature for five years.

In 1998, Geddes was selected to be Majority Caucus Chair where he served until 2000. Senator Jerry Twiggs president pro tempore suddenly died while jogging and Geddes was selected to succeed Twiggs. Geddes served as president pro tempore until 2010, the longest any senator has ever held the position in state history.

=== Line of succession ===
On two separate occasions Geddes as president pro tempore was required to serve as acting lieutenant governor and first in line of succession to the governor under Article IV, Section 14 of the Idaho Constitution. First, in January 2001 after the resignation of Lieutenant Governor Butch Otter who was elected to the United States House of Representatives until Lieutenant Governor-elect Jim Risch was sworn into office. Later, Geddes was acting lieutenant governor again in May and June 2006 after Lieutenant Governor Jim Risch became governor upon the resignation of Governor Dirk Kempthorne to become secretary of the interior until Mark Ricks, whom Governor Risch appointed to fill the vacancy in the office he left, was confirmed by the Senate.

== Personal life ==
He and his wife, Tammy, have five children.
