= Endorsements in the 2012 Republican Party presidential primaries =

2012 Republican Party presidential primaries
- January 3 to July 14, 2012
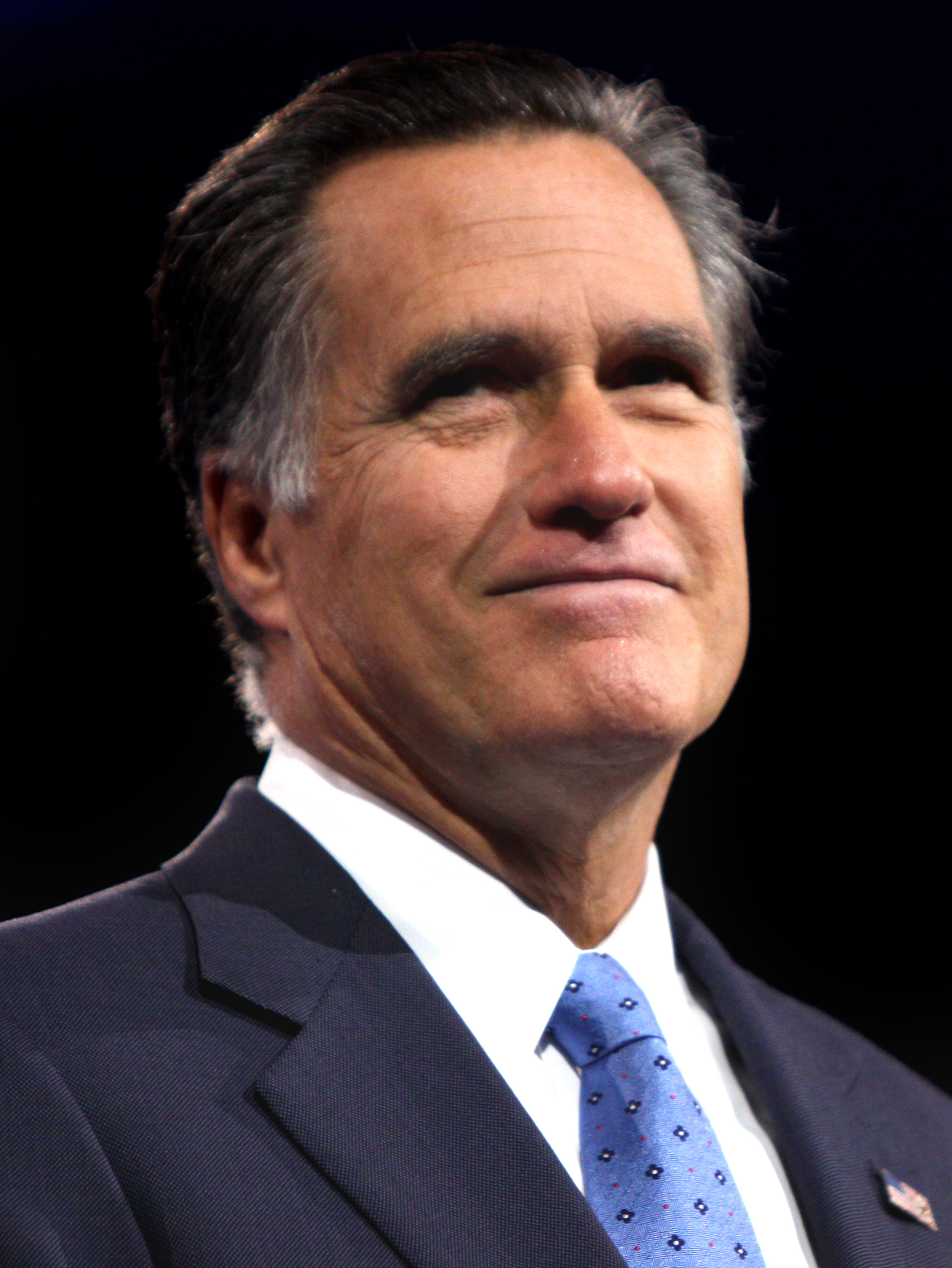

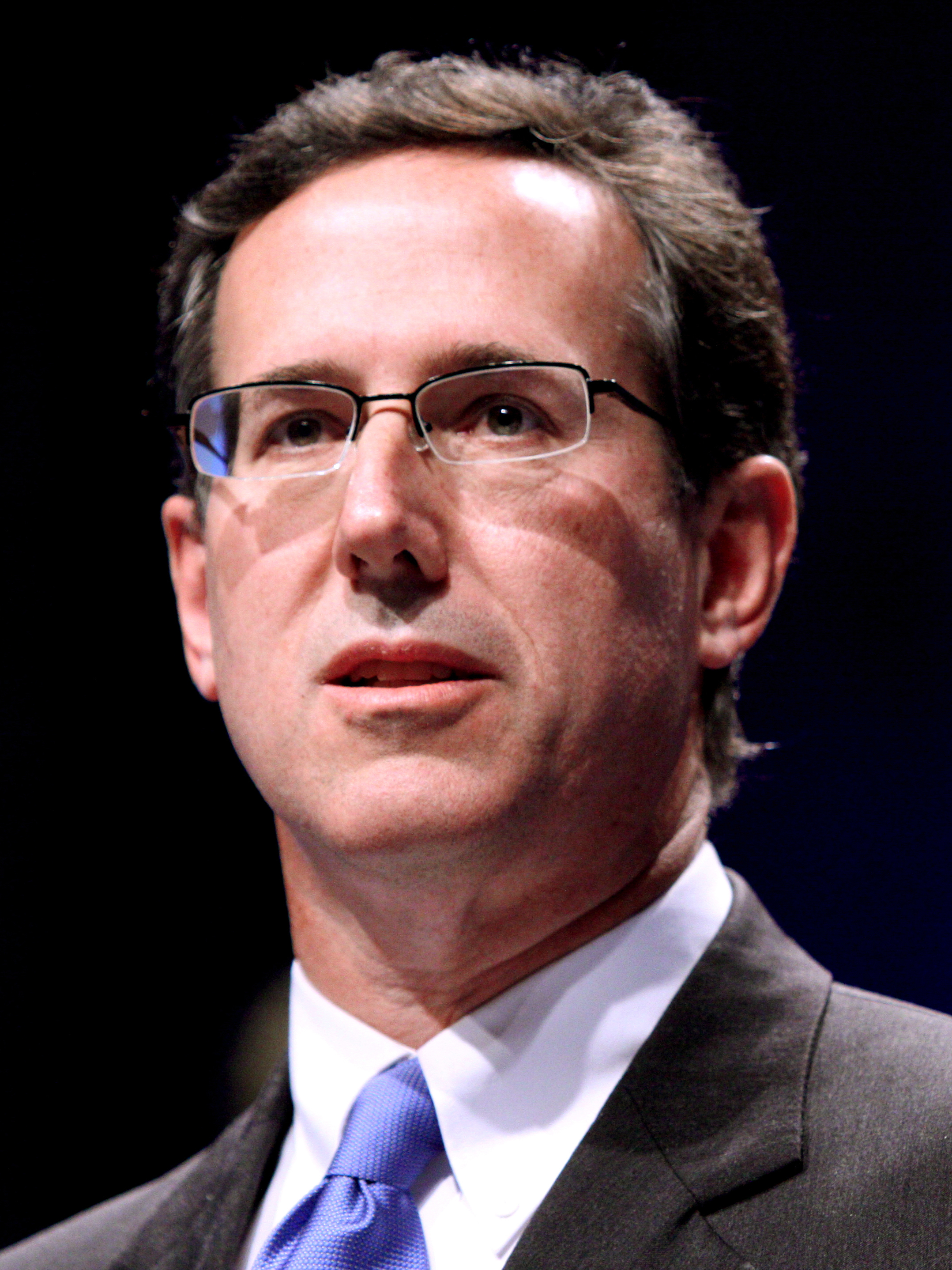

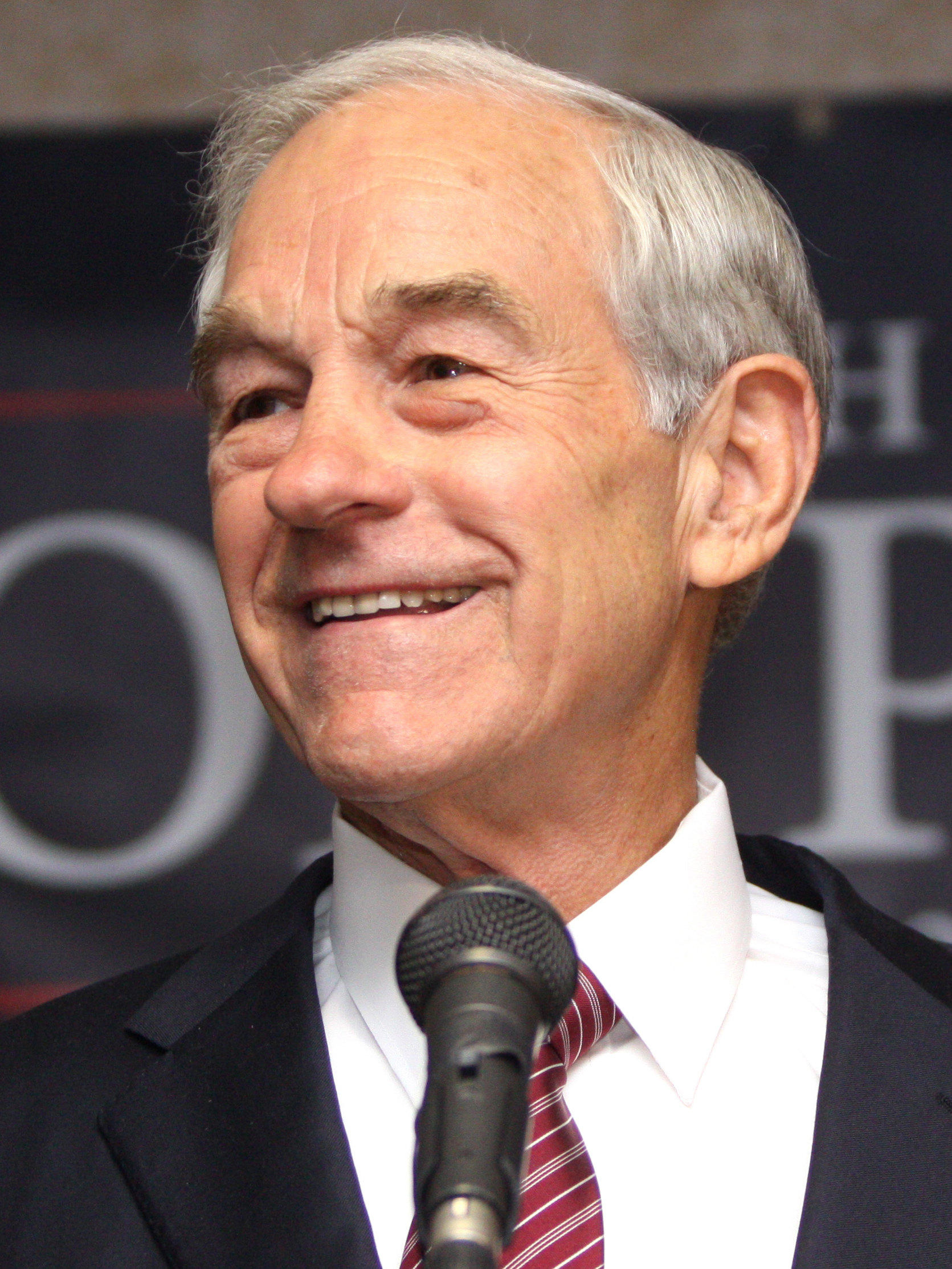

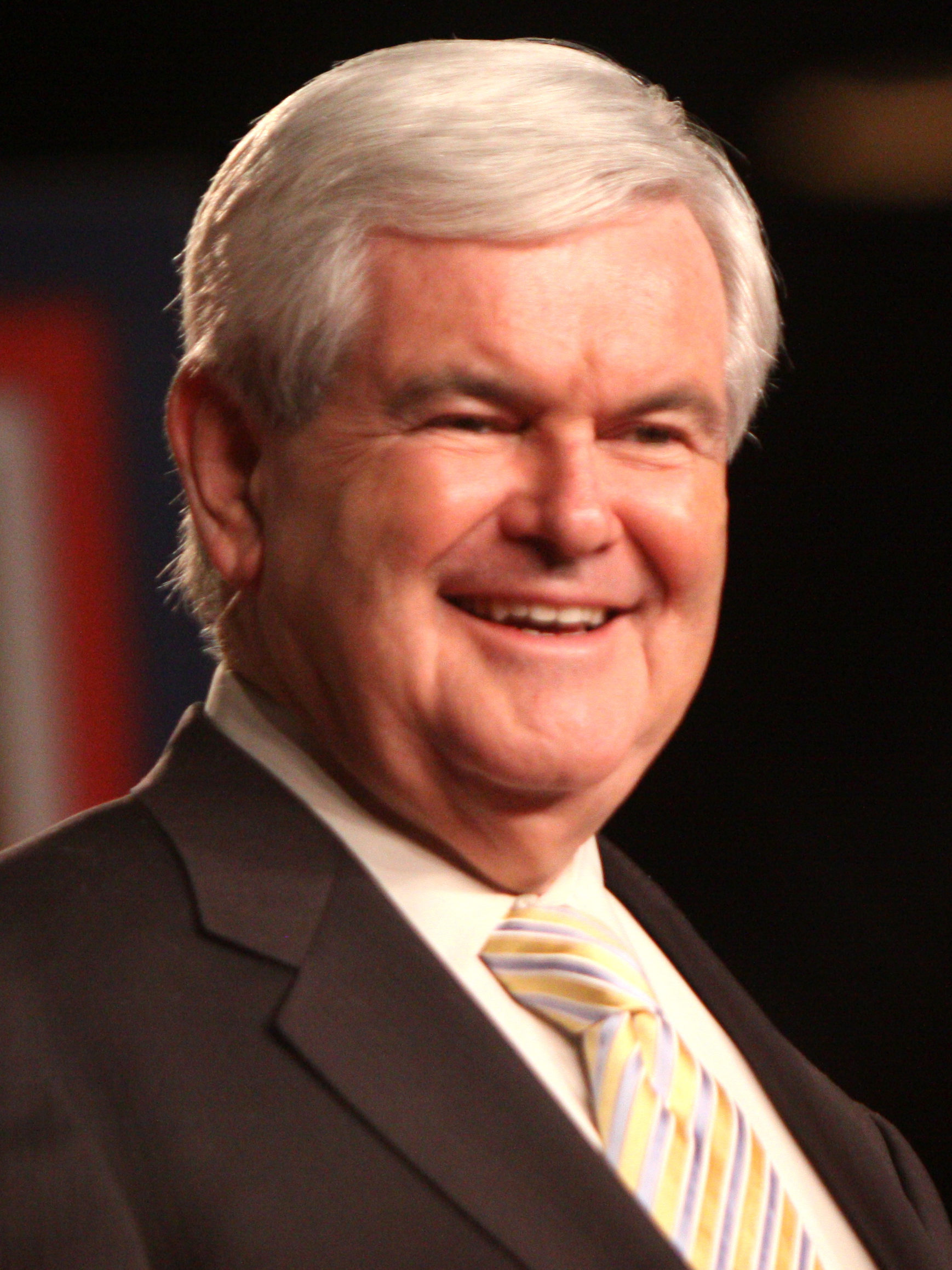
Candidate	Mitt Romney	Rick Santorum
Home state	Massachusetts	Pennsylvania
Delegate count	1,575	245
Contests won	42	11
Popular vote	10,048,134	3,938,527
Percentage	52.1%	20.4%
Candidate	Ron Paul	Newt Gingrich
Home state	Texas	Georgia
Delegate count	177	138
Contests won	4	2
Popular vote	2,099,441	2,737,442
Percentage	10.9%	14.2%

Mitt Romney
Rick Santorum
Newt Gingrich
Ron Paul
Previous Republican nominee
John McCain
Republican nominee
Mitt Romney

This article is a list of endorsements made by members of the 112th United States Congress and other elected officials during the 2012 Republican Party presidential primaries. Endorsements of statesmen and celebrities are also important to candidates. Late in the Republican race cycle, Romney toured Israel and Poland after a visit to the London 2012 Olympics. He received the endorsement of former president of Poland Lech Wałęsa, and soon after, the endorsement of actor Clint Eastwood. The winning of endorsements, also known as the Endorsement Race or Endorsement Derby, is argued to be a vital feature of the United States presidential race and the political party system.

Cumulative endorsements As of May 7, 2012
Candidate	Endorsement by:			Total
Candidate	Governor	Senate	House	Total
Jon Huntsman Jr. (withdrawn)	0	0	1	1
Tim Pawlenty (withdrawn)	0	0	2	2
Ron Paul	0	0	3	3
Rick Santorum (withdrawn)	0	0	6	6
Rick Perry (withdrawn)	1	1	9	11
Newt Gingrich (withdrawn)	1	0	11	12
Mitt Romney	19	28	85	132

== Tier 1 ==
=== Former Presidents of the United States ===
Former President	Party	State	Endorsement	Date	Notes	Reference
Jimmy Carter	Democratic	Georgia	Mitt Romney	September 15, 2011	39th President of the United States	
George H. W. Bush	Republican	Texas	Mitt Romney	March 28, 2012	41st President of the United States; 43rd Vice President of the United States	
George W. Bush	Republican	Texas	Mitt Romney	May 15, 2012	43rd President of the United States	

=== Withdrawn 2012 Republican candidates ===
Former candidate	Party	State	Endorsement	Date	Notes	Reference
Tim Pawlenty	Republican	Minnesota	Mitt Romney	9.12.2011		
Thaddeus McCotter	Republican	Michigan	Mitt Romney	September 22, 2011		
Gary Johnson	Republican/Libertarian	New Mexico	Ron Paul	December 28, 2011	Encouraged support for Paul in Republican primaries, but his own candidacy (Libertarian) in the general election.	
Jon Huntsman Jr.	Republican	Utah	Mitt Romney	January 16, 2012		
Herman Cain	Republican	Georgia	Mitt Romney	April 17, 2012	Originally endorsed Newt Gingrich on January 28, 2012	
Rick Perry	Republican	Texas	Mitt Romney	April 26, 2012	Originally endorsed Newt Gingrich on January 19, 2012	
Michele Bachmann	Republican	Minnesota	Mitt Romney	5.3.2012		
Newt Gingrich	Republican	Georgia	Mitt Romney	5.6.2012		
Rick Santorum	Republican	Pennsylvania	Mitt Romney	5.7.2012		

=== Current Governors ===
Governor	Party	State or Territory	Endorsement	Date	Notes	Reference
Terry Branstad	Republican	Iowa	Mitt Romney	4.10.2012		
Jan Brewer	Republican	Arizona	Mitt Romney	February 26, 2012		
Sam Brownback	Republican	Kansas	Rick Perry (withdrawn)	September 22, 2011	2008 presidential candidate	
Phil Bryant	Republican	Mississippi	Mitt Romney	3.8.2012		
Eddie Calvo	Republican	Guam	Mitt Romney	3.9.2012		
Chris Christie	Republican	New Jersey	Mitt Romney	10.11.2011		
Mitch Daniels	Republican	Indiana	Mitt Romney	April 18, 2012		
Nathan Deal	Republican	Georgia	Newt Gingrich (withdrawn)	December 13, 2011		
Benigno Fitial	Republican	Northern Mariana Islands	Mitt Romney	3.9.2012		
Luis Fortuño	Republican	Puerto Rico	Mitt Romney	January 27, 2012		
Bill Haslam	Republican	Tennessee	Mitt Romney	1.11.2012		
Nikki Haley	Republican	South Carolina	Mitt Romney	December 16, 2011		
Dave Heineman	Republican	Nebraska	Mitt Romney	6.10.2011		
Gary Herbert	Republican	Utah	Mitt Romney	February 2, 2012		
Bobby Jindal	Republican	Louisiana	Mitt Romney	4.10.2012	Originally endorsed Rick Perry on 9.12.2011	
Bob McDonnell	Republican	Virginia	Mitt Romney	January 20, 2012		
Butch Otter	Republican	Idaho	Mitt Romney	June 20, 2011		
Rick Perry	Republican	Texas	Mitt Romney	April 26, 2012	Originally endorsed Newt Gingrich on January 19, 2012	
Brian Sandoval	Republican	Nevada	Mitt Romney	4.11.2012	Originally endorsed Rick Perry on September 13, 2012	
Rick Scott	Republican	Florida	Mitt Romney	4.10.2011		
Rick Snyder	Republican	Michigan	Mitt Romney	February 16, 2012		

=== Current Senators ===
Senator	Party	State	Endorsement	Date	Notes	Reference
Lamar Alexander	Republican	Tennessee	Mitt Romney	February 24, 2012		
Kelly Ayotte	Republican	New Hampshire	Mitt Romney	November 20, 2011		
John Barrasso	Republican	Wyoming	Mitt Romney	April 13, 2012		
Roy Blunt	Republican	Missouri	Mitt Romney	September 20, 2011		
Scott Brown	Republican	Massachusetts	Mitt Romney			
Richard Burr	Republican	North Carolina	Mitt Romney	11.29.11		
Tom Coburn	Republican	Oklahoma	Mitt Romney	3.4.12		
Thad Cochran	Republican	Mississippi	Mitt Romney	10.12.2011		
Mike Enzi	Republican	Wyoming	Mitt Romney	April 13, 2012		
Lindsey Graham	Republican	South Carolina	Mitt Romney	4.10.2011		
Orrin Hatch	Republican	Utah	Mitt Romney	7.6.2011		
Dean Heller	Republican	Nevada	Mitt Romney	4.11.2012		
John Hoeven	Republican	North Dakota	Mitt Romney	November 18, 2011		
Kay Bailey Hutchison	Republican	Texas	Mitt Romney	May 15, 2012		
Jim Inhofe	Republican	Oklahoma	Rick Perry (withdrawn)	August 28, 2011		
Mike Johanns	Republican	Nebraska	Mitt Romney	December 21, 2011		
Ron Johnson	Republican	Wisconsin	Mitt Romney	4.1.2012		
Mark Kirk	Republican	Illinois	Mitt Romney	December 19, 2011		
Jon Kyl	Republican	Arizona	Mitt Romney	April 20, 2012	Minority Whip of the United States Senate	
Mike Lee	Republican	Utah	Mitt Romney	March 26, 2012		
John McCain	Republican	Arizona	Mitt Romney	1.4.2012	2008 Republican presidential nominee	
Mitch McConnell	Republican	Kentucky	Mitt Romney	April 17, 2012	Minority Leader of the United States Senate	
Lisa Murkowski	Republican	Alaska	Mitt Romney	12.2.2011		
Rand Paul	Republican	Kentucky	Mitt Romney	6.7.2012	Originally endorsed his father, Ron Paul	
Rob Portman	Republican	Ohio	Mitt Romney	January 19, 2012		
Jim Risch	Republican	Idaho	Mitt Romney	June 20, 2011		
Marco Rubio	Republican	Florida	Mitt Romney	March 28, 2012		
John Thune	Republican	South Dakota	Mitt Romney	November 23, 2011		
Pat Toomey	Republican	Pennsylvania	Mitt Romney	4.10.2012		

=== Current Representatives ===
U.S. Representative	Party	State	Endorsement	Date	Notes	Reference
Joe Barton	Republican	Texas	Newt Gingrich (withdrawn)	5.12.2011		
Michael Burgess	Republican	Texas	Newt Gingrich (withdrawn)			
Dan Burton	Republican	Indiana	Newt Gingrich (withdrawn)			
Trent Franks	Republican	Arizona	Newt Gingrich (withdrawn)	January 13, 2012	Originally endorsed Michele Bachmann on 12.1.2011	
Phil Gingrey	Republican	Georgia	Newt Gingrich (withdrawn)	August 26, 2011		
Andrew Harris	Republican	Maryland	Newt Gingrich (withdrawn)	November 30, 2011		
Jack Kingston	Republican	Georgia	Newt Gingrich (withdrawn)	May 17, 2011		
Tom Price	Republican	Georgia	Newt Gingrich (withdrawn)	5.4.2011		
David Rivera	Republican	Florida	Newt Gingrich (withdrawn)	January 13, 2012		
Austin Scott	Republican	Georgia	Newt Gingrich (withdrawn)	August 26, 2011		
Lynn Westmoreland	Republican	Georgia	Newt Gingrich (withdrawn)			
Richard Hanna	Republican	New York	Jon Huntsman (withdrawn)	1.8.2012		
Justin Amash	Republican	Michigan	Ron Paul			
Tim Johnson	Republican	Illinois	Ron Paul	March 13, 2012		
Walter Jones	Republican	North Carolina	Ron Paul			
John Kline	Republican	Minnesota	Tim Pawlenty (withdrawn)	2.24.11		
Joe Wilson	Republican	South Carolina	Tim Pawlenty (withdrawn)	6.9.2011		
Mike Coffman	Republican	Colorado	Rick Perry (withdrawn)	October 17, 2011		
John Culberson	Republican	Texas	Rick Perry (withdrawn)			
Sam Graves	Republican	Missouri	Rick Perry (withdrawn)	August 15, 2011		
Jeb Hensarling	Republican	Texas	Rick Perry (withdrawn)	August 25, 2011		
Sam Johnson	Republican	Texas	Rick Perry (withdrawn)			
Kenny Marchant	Republican	Texas	Rick Perry (withdrawn)			
Mike McCaul	Republican	Texas	Rick Perry (withdrawn)			
Mick Mulvaney	Republican	South Carolina	Rick Perry (withdrawn)			
Steve Scalise	Republican	Louisiana	Rick Perry (withdrawn)			
Sandy Adams	Republican	Florida	Mitt Romney	January 18, 2012		
Rodney Alexander	Republican	Louisiana	Mitt Romney	10.6.2011		
Mark Amodei	Republican	Nevada	Mitt Romney	October 26, 2011		
Michele Bachmann	Republican	Minnesota	Mitt Romney	5.3.2012		
Spencer Bachus	Republican	Alabama	Mitt Romney	4.11.2012		
Charlie Bass	Republican	New Hampshire	Mitt Romney	November 21, 2011		
Dan Benishek	Republican	Michigan	Mitt Romney	January 20, 2012	Originally endorsed Herman Cain on 11.5.2011	
Judy Biggert	Republican	Illinois	Mitt Romney	10.12.2011		
Brian Bilbray	Republican	California	Mitt Romney	12.6.2011		
Rob Bishop	Republican	Utah	Mitt Romney			
Diane Black	Republican	Tennessee	Mitt Romney	12.5.2011		
John Boehner	Republican	Ohio	Mitt Romney	April 17, 2012	Speaker of the United States House of Representatives	
Jo Bonner	Republican	Alabama	Mitt Romney	4.11.2012		
Mary Bono Mack	Republican	California	Mitt Romney			
Mo Brooks	Republican	Alabama	Mitt Romney	4.11.2012		
Ken Calvert	Republican	California	Mitt Romney	12.6.2011		
Dave Camp	Republican	Michigan	Mitt Romney	December 20, 2011	Chairman of the House Ways And Means Committee	
John Campbell	Republican	California	Mitt Romney			
Eric Cantor	Republican	Virginia	Mitt Romney	3.4.2012	House Majority Leader	
John Carter	Republican	Texas	Mitt Romney	4.5.2012	Originally endorsed Rick Perry	
Steve Chabot	Republican	Ohio	Mitt Romney	April 18, 2012		
Jason Chaffetz	Republican	Utah	Mitt Romney		Former Campaign Manager for Jon Huntsman's gubernatorial campaign.	
Howard Coble	Republican	North Carolina	Mitt Romney	October 17, 2011		
Mike Conaway	Republican	Texas	Mitt Romney	January 20, 2012	Originally endorsed Rick Perry	
Ander Crenshaw	Republican	Florida	Mitt Romney	June 16, 2011		
Jeff Denham	Republican	California	Mitt Romney	March 27, 2012		
Charlie Dent	Republican	Pennsylvania	Mitt Romney	March 13, 2012		
Scott DesJarlais	Republican	Tennessee	Mitt Romney	3.2.2012		
Mario Díaz-Balart	Republican	Florida	Mitt Romney	November 29, 2011		
Robert Dold	Republican	Illinois	Mitt Romney	November 14, 2011		
Jimmy Duncan	Republican	Tennessee	Mitt Romney	12.5.2011		
Mike Fitzpatrick	Republican	Pennsylvania	Mitt Romney	3.2.2012		
Jeff Flake	Republican	Arizona	Mitt Romney	September 19, 2011		
Virginia Foxx	Republican	North Carolina	Mitt Romney	October 17, 2011		
Jim Gerlach	Republican	Pennsylvania	Mitt Romney			
Kay Granger	Republican	Texas	Mitt Romney	January 20, 2012		
Timothy Griffin	Republican	Arkansas	Mitt Romney	10.5.2011		
Michael Grimm	Republican	New York	Mitt Romney			
Nan Hayworth	Republican	New York	Mitt Romney			
Joe Heck	Republican	Nevada	Mitt Romney			
Wally Herger	Republican	California	Mitt Romney			
Jaime Herrera Beutler	Republican	Washington	Mitt Romney	2.6.2012		
Bill Huizenga	Republican	Michigan	Mitt Romney			
Darrell Issa	Republican	California	Mitt Romney		Chairman of the House Oversight and Government Reform Committee	
Leonard Lance	Republican	New Jersey	Mitt Romney	October 26, 2011		
Steve LaTourette	Republican	Ohio	Mitt Romney	October 26, 2011		
Jerry Lewis	Republican	California	Mitt Romney	12.6.2011		
Billy Long	Republican	Missouri	Mitt Romney			
Cynthia Lummis	Republican	Wyoming	Mitt Romney	November 14, 2011		
Connie Mack IV	Republican	Florida	Mitt Romney			
Kevin McCarthy	Republican	California	Mitt Romney	March 26, 2012	Majority Whip of the United States House of Representatives	
Thaddeus McCotter	Republican	Michigan	Mitt Romney			
Patrick McHenry	Republican	North Carolina	Mitt Romney	October 17, 2011		
Howard McKeon	Republican	California	Mitt Romney		Chairman of the House Armed Services Committee	
Cathy McMorris Rodgers	Republican	Washington	Mitt Romney	12.7.2011		
John Mica	Republican	Florida	Mitt Romney		Chairman of the House Transportation and Infrastructure Committee	
Candice Miller	Republican	Michigan	Mitt Romney	March 21, 2012	Originally endorsed Rick Perry	
Jeff Miller	Republican	Florida	Mitt Romney	October 28, 2011		
Pete Olson	Republican	Texas	Mitt Romney	January 20, 2012		
Erik Paulsen	Republican	Minnesota	Mitt Romney	January 26, 2012	Originally endorsed Tim Pawlenty	
Dave Reichert	Republican	Washington	Mitt Romney	February 28, 2012		
Jim Renacci	Republican	Ohio	Mitt Romney	October 25, 2011		
Martha Roby	Republican	Alabama	Mitt Romney	4.11.2012		
Phil Roe	Republican	Tennessee	Mitt Romney	12.5.2011		
Hal Rogers	Republican	Kentucky	Mitt Romney	October 17, 2011	Chairman of the House Appropriations Committee	
Mike Rogers	Republican	Alabama	Mitt Romney			
Mike Rogers	Republican	Michigan	Mitt Romney	December 22, 2011		
Dana Rohrabacher	Republican	California	Mitt Romney	December 12, 2011		
Todd Rokita	Republican	Indiana	Mitt Romney	September 23, 2011		
Tom Rooney	Republican	Florida	Mitt Romney			
Ileana Ros-Lehtinen	Republican	Florida	Mitt Romney	November 29, 2011		
Paul Ryan	Republican	Wisconsin	Mitt Romney	March 30, 2012	Chairman of the House Budget Committee	
Aaron Schock	Republican	Illinois	Mitt Romney	11.8.2011		
Pete Sessions	Republican	Texas	Mitt Romney	4.5.2012	Chairman of the National Republican Congressional Committee	
John Shimkus	Republican	Illinois	Mitt Romney	March 18, 2012		
Bill Shuster	Republican	Pennsylvania	Mitt Romney	March 13, 2012		
Mike Simpson	Republican	Idaho	Mitt Romney			
Lamar Smith	Republican	Texas	Mitt Romney	October 26, 2011	Chairman of the House Judiciary Committee	
Mac Thornberry	Republican	Texas	Mitt Romney	4.5.2012		
Mike Turner	Republican	Ohio	Mitt Romney	January 17, 2012		
Fred Upton	Republican	Michigan	Mitt Romney	2.8.2012		
Tim Walberg	Republican	Michigan	Mitt Romney	2.8.2012		
Greg Walden	Republican	Oregon	Mitt Romney	October 14, 2011		
Ed Whitfield	Republican	Kentucky	Mitt Romney	October 17, 2011		
Steve Womack	Republican	Arkansas	Mitt Romney	January 19, 2012		
Robert Aderholt	Republican	Alabama	Rick Santorum (withdrawn)	February 24, 2012		
Lou Barletta	Republican	Pennsylvania	Rick Santorum (withdrawn)			
Jo Ann Emerson	Republican	Missouri	Rick Santorum (withdrawn)	3.10.2012		
Tom Marino	Republican	Pennsylvania	Rick Santorum (withdrawn)			
Alan Nunnelee	Republican	Mississippi	Rick Santorum (withdrawn)	March 13, 2012		
Glenn Thompson	Republican	Pennsylvania	Rick Santorum (withdrawn)			

== Tier 2 (State Senators and Representatives) ==
=== Michele Bachmann (withdrawn) ===
Senator or Representative	Party	State	Date	Notes	Reference
Senator Nancy Boettger	Republican	Iowa	June 30, 2011		
Senator Mark Chelgren	Republican	Iowa	7.2.2011		
Senator Jack Whitver	Republican	Iowa			
Senator Brad Zaun	Republican	Iowa	June 28, 2011		
Representative Mark Brandenburg	Republican	Iowa	8.9.2011		
Representative Betty De Boef	Republican	Iowa	8.9.2011		

=== Herman Cain (withdrawn) ===
Senator or Representative	Party	State	Date	Notes	Reference
Senator Joe Hune	Republican	Michigan	November 15, 2011		
Senator Joshua McKoon	Republican	Georgia			
Senator Renee Unterman	Republican	Georgia	11.9.2011		
Representative Larry Ahern	Republican	Florida	September 23, 2011		
Representative J. Michael Ball	Republican	New Hampshire	November 19, 2011		
Representative Charles Brosseau	Republican	New Hampshire	November 19, 2011		
Representative William Condra	Republican	New Hampshire	November 19, 2011		
Representative Rusty Kidd	Independent	Georgia	August 31, 2011		
Representative Billy Maddox	Republican	Georgia	August 31, 2011		
Representative Kevin Reichard	Republican	New Hampshire	November 19, 2011		
Representative Steven Smith	Republican	New Hampshire	September 14, 2011		
Representative Joseph Thomas	Republican	New Hampshire	November 19, 2011		

=== Newt Gingrich (withdrawn) ===
Senator or Representative	Party	State	Date	Notes	Reference
Senator Thad Altman	Republican	Florida	1.6.2012		
Senator Randy Feenstra	Republican	Iowa	December 15, 2011		
Senator Shawn Hamerlinck	Republican	Iowa	December 15, 2011		
Senator Judson Hill	Republican	Georgia	August 26, 2011		
Senator David Johnson	Republican	Iowa	December 15, 2011		
Senator Ray Merrick	Republican	Kansas	February 15, 2012	Former State House Majority Leader	
Senator Jim Norman	Republican	Florida	1.6.2012		
Senator Rob Olson	Republican	Kansas	February 15, 2012		
Senator Rick Quinn	Republican	South Carolina	January 19, 2012		
Senator James Seymour	Republican	Iowa	December 15, 2011		
Representative Donald Andolina	Republican	New Hampshire	1.3.2012		
Representative Michael Bileca	Republican	Florida	1.6.2012		
Representative Kenny Bingham	Republican	South Carolina	1.2.2012	State House Majority Leader	
Representative Paulette Braddock	Republican	Georgia	August 26, 2011		
Representative Charles Brosseau	Republican	New Hampshire	1.3.2012		
Representative Anthony Brown	Republican	Kansas	February 15, 2012		
Representative Josh Byrnes	Republican	Iowa	December 15, 2011		
Representative Sam Cataldo	Republican	New Hampshire	November 29, 2011	Originally endorsed Herman Cain on November 19, 2011.	
Representative Sharon Cooper	Republican	Georgia	August 26, 2011		
Representative J.C. Daugherty	Republican	New Hampshire	1.3.2012		
Representative Robert Elliott	Republican	New Hampshire	1.3.2012		
Representative Harry Geisinger	Republican	Georgia	August 26, 2011		
Representative Mario Goico	Republican	Kansas	February 15, 2012		
Representative Chris Hagenow	Republican	Iowa	December 15, 2011		
Representative Bob Hager	Republican	Iowa	December 15, 2011		
Representative Bobby Harrell	Republican	South Carolina	January 19, 2012	Speaker of the State House	
Representative Gayle Harrell	Republican	Florida	1.6.2012		
Representative Matt Hatchett	Republican	Georgia	August 26, 2011		
Representative Gregory Hill	Republican	New Hampshire	1.3.2012		
Representative Sean Jerguson	Republican	Georgia	August 26, 2011		
Representative Jeff Kaufmann	Republican	Iowa	December 15, 2011		
Representative Frank Kotowski	Republican	New Hampshire	1.3.2012		
Representative Kathleen Lauer-Rago	Republican	New Hampshire	1.3.2012		
Representative Trent LeDoux	Republican	Kansas	February 15, 2012		
Representative Deborah Mayfield	Republican	Florida	1.6.2012		
Representative Peter McCoy	Republican	South Carolina	1.2.2012		
Representative William O'Brien	Republican	New Hampshire	December 21, 2011	Speaker of the State House	
Representative William Panek	Republican	New Hampshire	November 29, 2011	Originally endorsed Herman Cain on November 19, 2011.	
Representative Kraig Paulsen	Republican	Iowa	December 21, 2011	Speaker of the State House	
Representative Joseph Pitre	Republican	New Hampshire	1.3.2012		
Representative Larry Powell	Republican	Kansas	February 15, 2012		
Representative Scott Raecker	Republican	Iowa	December 30, 2011	Chairman of the State House Appropriations Committee	
Representative John Rubin	Republican	Kansas	February 15, 2012		
Representative Frank Sapareto	Republican	New Hampshire	1.3.2012		
Representative Scott Schwab	Republican	Kansas	February 15, 2012		
Representative Ken Sheffert	Republican	New Hampshire	1.3.2012		
Representative Greg Sorg	Republican	New Hampshire	1.3.2012		
Representative Carlos Trujillo	Republican	Florida	1.6.2012	Originally endorsed Herman Cain	
Representative Joe Wilkinson	Republican	Georgia	August 26, 2011		
Representative Linda Upmeyer	Republican	Iowa	January 25, 2011	State House Majority Leader	

=== Jon Huntsman (withdrawn) ===
Senator or Representative	Party	State	Date	Notes	Reference
Senator Ellyn Setnor Bogdanoff	Republican	Florida	August 17, 2011		
Senator John E. Courson	Republican	South Carolina			
Representative Peter Bolster	Republican	New Hampshire	October 20, 2011		
Representative Julie Brown	Republican	New Hampshire			
Representative Richard Drisko	Republican	New Hampshire	October 20, 2011		
Representative Carolyn Gargasz	Republican	New Hampshire	October 20, 2011		
Representative David Kidder	Republican	New Hampshire	October 20, 2011		
Representative David Knox	Republican	New Hampshire			
Representative Rick Ladd Jr.	Republican	New Hampshire			
Representative Priscilla Lockwood	Republican	New Hampshire	October 20, 2011		
Representative David Robbins	Republican	New Hampshire	October 20, 2011		
Representative Jeff St. Cyr	Republican	New Hampshire			
Representative Adam Schroadter	Republican	New Hampshire			
Representative Jim Waddell	Republican	New Hampshire			

=== Gary Johnson (withdrawn) ===
Senator or Representative	Party	State	Date	Notes	Reference
Representative Bruce MacMahon	Republican	New Hampshire	10.4.2011		
Representative Brian Seaworth	Republican	New Hampshire	10.4.2011		
Representative Kyle Tasker	Republican	New Hampshire	10.4.2011		

=== Ron Paul ===
Senator or Representative	Party	State	Date	Notes	Reference
Senator Lee Bright	Republican	South Carolina	January 17, 2012		
Senator Kevin Bryant	Republican	South Carolina	January 17, 2012		
Senator Tom Davis	Republican	South Carolina	January 15, 2012		
Senator Mike Doherty	Republican	New Jersey	September 26, 2011		
Senator Jim Forsythe	Republican	New Hampshire	6.8.2011		
Senator Nicholas D. Kettle	Republican	Rhode Island			
Senator Shirley McKague	Republican	Idaho			
Senator Monty Pearce	Republican	Idaho	3.2.2012		
Senator Andy Sanborn	Republican	New Hampshire	October 26, 2011		
Senator Kent Sorenson	Republican	Iowa	December 28, 2011	Former Michele Bachmann Iowa state campaign chair	
Senator Danny Verdin	Republican	South Carolina	January 17, 2012		
Senator Ray White	Republican	New Hampshire	December 14, 2011		
Representative Vito Barbieri	Republican	Idaho			
Representative Glen Bradley	Republican	North Carolina			
Representative Jenn Coffey	Republican	New Hampshire			
Representative Tim Comerford	Republican	New Hampshire			
Representative Paul Curtman	Republican	Missouri	February 18, 2012		
Representative Cameron DeJong	Republican	New Hampshire			
Representative Phil Hart	Republican	Idaho	August 16, 2011		
Representative Kyle Jones	Republican	New Hampshire	August 16, 2011		
Representative Laura Jones	Republican	New Hampshire			
Representative George Lambert	Republican	New Hampshire			
Representative Aaron Libby	Republican	Maine	January 28, 2012		
Representative Glen Massie	Republican	Iowa	May 23, 2011		
Representative Donna Mauro	Republican	New Hampshire			
Representative Andrew Manuse	Republican	New Hampshire	10.1.2011		
Representative Paul Mirski	Republican	New Hampshire	7.11.2011		
Representative Keith Murphy	Republican	New Hampshire	November 22, 2011		
Representative Pete Nielsen	Republican	Idaho			
Representative Kim Pearson	Republican	Iowa	6.8.2011		
Representative Joel Robideaux	Republican	Louisiana	January 20, 2012	State House Speaker Pro Tempore	
Representative Jason Schultz	Republican	Iowa			
Representative Tammy Simmons	Republican	New Hampshire			
Representative Norman Tregenza	Republican	New Hampshire			
Representative Lucien Vita	Republican	New Hampshire			
Representative Carol Vita	Republican	New Hampshire			
Representative Mark Warden	Republican	New Hampshire			

=== Rick Perry (withdrawn) ===
Senator or Representative	Party	State	Date	Notes	Reference
Senator Don Gaetz	Republican	Florida	August 30, 2011		
Senator Harvey S. Peeler Jr.	Republican	South Carolina		State Senate Majority Leader	
Representative Jeff Brandes	Republican	Florida			
Representative Dean Cannon	Republican	Florida	August 24, 2011	Speaker of the Florida House of Representatives	
Representative Matt Gaetz	Republican	Florida			
Representative Daniel Logue	Republican	California			
Representative Carlos Lopez-Cantera	Republican	Florida	September 22, 2011	State House Majority Leader	

=== Mitt Romney ===
Senator or Representative	Party	State	Date	Notes	Reference
Senator John C. Andreason	Republican	Idaho	2.8.2012		
Senator Steve Bair	Republican	Idaho	2.8.2012		
Senator Toni Boucher	Republican	Connecticut	September 29, 2011		
Senator Bert Brackett	Republican	Idaho	2.8.2012		
Senator Dean L. Cameron	Republican	Idaho	2.8.2012		
Senator Rich Crandall	Republican	Arizona	February 2, 2012		
Senator Denton Darrington	Republican	Idaho	2.8.2012		
Senator Bart Davis	Republican	Idaho	June 20, 2011	State Senate Majority Leader	
Senator Adam Driggs	Republican	Arizona	February 2, 2012		
Senator Scott Frantz	Republican	Connecticut	September 29, 2011		
Senator Lee Heider	Republican	Idaho	2.8.2012		
Senator Brent Hill	Republican	Idaho	June 20, 2011	State Senate President Pro Tempore	
Senator Rick Jones	Republican	Michigan			
Senator Rob Kane	Republican	Connecticut	September 29, 2011		
Senator Shawn Keough	Republican	Idaho	2.8.2012		
Senator Steve King	Republican	Colorado	2.6.2012		
Senator Jerry Lewis	Republican	Arizona	February 2, 2012		
Senator John McComish	Republican	Arizona	February 2, 2012		
Senator John McKinney	Republican	Connecticut	September 29, 2011	State Senate Minority Leader	
Senator Michael McLachlan	Republican	Connecticut	September 29, 2011		
Senator Dean Mortimer	Republican	Idaho	2.8.2012		
Senator John Proos	Republican	Michigan			
Senator Michele Reagan	Republican	Arizona	February 2, 2012		
Senator Randy Richardville	Republican	Michigan		State Senate Majority Leader	
Senator Tonya Schuitmaker	Republican	Michigan			
Senator Jeff Siddoway	Republican	Idaho	2.8.2012		
Senator Liane Sorenson	Republican	Delaware	October 27, 2011		
Senator Nancy Spence	Republican	Colorado			
Senator John Tippets	Republican	Idaho	2.8.2012		
Senator Cam Ward	Republican	Alabama	October 21, 2011		
Senator Jean White	Republican	Colorado	2.4.2012		
Senator Chuck Winder	Republican	Idaho	June 20, 2011	Assistant State Senate Majority Leader	
Senator Kevin Witkos	Republican	Connecticut	September 29, 2011		
Representative Cindy Acree	Republican	Colorado			
Representative Mike Alberts	Republican	Connecticut	September 29, 2011		
Representative Eric Anderson	Republican	Idaho	2.8.2012		
Representative Cecil Ash	Republican	Arizona	February 2, 2012		
Representative Linden B. Bateman	Republican	Idaho	2.8.2012		
Representative Scott Bedke	Republican	Idaho	June 20, 2011	State House Assistant Majority Leader	
Representative Maxine Bell	Republican	Idaho	2.8.2012		
Representative Sharon L. Block	Republican	Idaho	2.8.2012		
Representative Jase Bolger	Republican	Michigan		Speaker of the State House	
Representative Kate Brophy	Republican	Arizona	February 2, 2012		
Representative Larry Cafero	Republican	Connecticut	September 29, 2011	State House Minority Leader	
Representative Heather Carter	Republican	Arizona	February 2, 2012		
Representative Steve Court	Republican	Arizona	February 2, 2012	Majority Leader of the State House	
Representative Chris Coutu	Republican	Connecticut	September 29, 2011		
Representative Reed DeMordaunt	Republican	Idaho	2.8.2012		
Representative Lawerence Denney	Republican	Idaho	June 20, 2011	Speaker of the State House	
Representative Karen Fann	Republican	Arizona	February 2, 2012		
Representative Tom Forese	Republican	Arizona	February 2, 2012		
Representative Bob Gardner	Republican	Colorado	2.6.2012		
Representative Cheri Gerou	Republican	Colorado	2.4.2012		
Representative Marc Gibbs	Republican	Idaho	2.8.2012		
Representative Janice Giegler	Republican	Connecticut	September 29, 2011		
Representative Doris Goodale	Republican	Arizona	February 2, 2012		
Representative Jack Harper	Republican	Arizona	February 2, 2012		
Representative John Hetherington	Republican	Connecticut	September 29, 2011		
Representative Mike Hubbard	Republican	Alabama	10.5.2011	Speaker of the State House	
Representative Steve Hurst	Republican	Alabama			
Representative Russ Jones	Republican	Arizona	February 2, 2012		
Representative Peggy Judd	Republican	Arizona	February 2, 2012		
Representative John Kavanagh	Republican	Arizona	February 2, 2012		
Representative Jim Kerr	Republican	Colorado	2.4.2012		
Representative Gregory Lavelle	Republican	Delaware	October 27, 2011	House Republican Leader	
Representative Larry Liston	Republican	Colorado	2.4.2012		
Representative Matt Lori	Republican	Michigan			
Representative Lynn Luker	Republican	Idaho	2.8.2012		
Representative Jim Marriott	Republican	Idaho	2.8.2012		
Representative Tom Massey	Republican	Colorado	2.4.2012		
Representative Janice McGeachin	Republican	Idaho	2.8.2012		
Representative Nancy McLain	Republican	Arizona	February 2, 2012		
Representative Frank McNulty	Republican	Colorado		Speaker of the State House	
Representative Carole Murray	Republican	Colorado	2.4.2012		
Representative Aric Nesbitt	Republican	Michigan	2.8.2012		
Representative B.J. Nikkel	Republican	Colorado		State House Majority Whip	
Representative Margaret O'Brien	Republican	Michigan			
Representative Justin Olson	Republican	Arizona	February 2, 2012		
Representative Mark Ouimet	Republican	Michigan			
Representative Joe Palmer	Republican	Idaho	2.8.2012		
Representative Jason Perillo	Republican	Connecticut	September 29, 2011		
Representative Kevin Priola	Republican	Colorado	2.4.2012		
Representative Robert Ramirez	Republican	Colorado			
Representative Dell Raybould	Republican	Idaho	2.8.2012		
Representative Ken Roberts	Republican	Idaho	June 20, 2011	State House Majority Caucus Chair	
Representative Bob Robson	Republican	Arizona	February 2, 2012		
Representative David Scribner	Republican	Connecticut	September 29, 2011		
Representative Mack G. Shirley	Republican	Idaho	2.8.2012		
Representative David Smith	Republican	Arizona	February 2, 2012		
Representative Bert Stevenson	Republican	Idaho	2.8.2012		
Representative Spencer Swalm	Republican	Colorado	2.4.2012		
Representative Jeff Thompson	Republican	Idaho	2.8.2012		
Representative Andy Tobin	Republican	Arizona	February 2, 2012	Speaker of the State House	
Representative Tom Trail	Republican	Idaho	2.8.2012		
Representative Steve Urie	Republican	Arizona	February 2, 2012		
Representative Lesley Vance	Republican	Alabama			
Representative Mark Waller	Republican	Colorado	2.4.2012		
Representative Phil Williams	Republican	Alabama			
Representative Fred Wood	Republican	Idaho	2.8.2012		
Representative Randy Wood	Republican	Alabama			
Representative Terrie Wood	Republican	Connecticut	September 29, 2011		

=== Rick Santorum (withdrawn) ===
Senator or Representative	Party	State	Date	Notes	Reference
Senator David Brown	Republican	Minnesota	2.6.2012		
Senator Chip Campsen	Republican	South Carolina	January 15, 2012		
Senator John Carlson	Republican	Minnesota	2.6.2012		
Senator Jake Corman	Republican	Pennsylvania	9.6.2011	Senate Appropriations Committee chairman	
Senator Paul Gazelka	Republican	Minnesota	2.6.2012		
Senator Glenn Grothman	Republican	Wisconsin	March 30, 2012	Senate Assistant Majority Leader	
Senator Dan Hall	Republican	Minnesota	2.6.2012		
Senator David Hann	Republican	Minnesota	2.6.2012		
Senator Gretchen Hoffman	Republican	Minnesota	2.6.2012		
Senator Bill Ingebrigtsen	Republican	Minnesota	2.6.2012		
Senator Ben Kruse	Republican	Minnesota	2.6.2012		
Senator Jim Luther	Republican	New Hampshire	1.5.2012		
Senator Sean Nienow	Republican	Minnesota	2.6.2012		
Senator Joseph B. Scarnati	Republican	Pennsylvania	9.6.2011	Senate President Pro Tempore	
Senator David Thompson	Republican	Minnesota	2.6.2012		
Representative Jason Antosz	Republican	New Hampshire			
Representative Susan DeLemus	Republican	New Hampshire	1.5.2012		
Representative Greg Delleney	Republican	South Carolina	1.12.2012		
Representative Andre Jacque	Republican	Wisconsin	March 30, 2012		
Representative Scott Krug	Republican	Wisconsin	March 30, 2012		
Representative Daniel LeMahieu	Republican	Wisconsin	March 30, 2012		
Representative Mike LeMieur	Republican	Minnesota	2.6.2012		
Representative Deborah Long	Republican	South Carolina	September 15, 2011		
Representative Joe McDonald	Republican	Minnesota	2.6.2012		
Representative Stephen Nass	Republican	Wisconsin	March 30, 2012		
Representative Jeanine Notter	Republican	New Hampshire	September 21, 2011		
Representative Lenette Peterson	Republican	New Hampshire			
Representative Scott Plakon	Republican	Florida	January 26, 2012	Originally endorsed Herman Cain on September 23, 2011	
Representative Wes Shuler	Republican	New Hampshire	September 21, 2011		
Representative Matt Swank	Republican	New Hampshire			
Representative Evan Wynn	Republican	Wisconsin	March 30, 2012		

== Tier 3 (Statesmen, former politicians, and celebrities) ==
=== Michele Bachmann (withdrawn) ===
Statesmen, former politicians, and celebrities	Party	Endorsement	Date	Notes	Reference
Kelsey Grammer	Republican	Michele Bachmann (withdrawn)		Actor	
Stanley Hubbard	Independent	Michele Bachmann (withdrawn)		CEO of Hubbard Broadcasting, the parent company of Reelz Channel	
Wayne Newton	Republican	Michele Bachmann (withdrawn)		Las Vegas singer	

=== Herman Cain (withdrawn) ===
Statesmen, former politicians, and celebrities	Party	Endorsement	Date	Notes	Reference
Jack Kimball	Republican	Herman Cain (withdrawn)		Former chairman of the New Hampshire Republican Party and 2010 New Hampshire gubernatorial candidate	
Dennis Miller		Herman Cain (withdrawn)		Comedian and talk radio host—has since withdrawn his endorsement	
Nick Searcy		Herman Cain (withdrawn)		Actor	
Michael D. Steele		Herman Cain (withdrawn)		Retired U.S. Army Colonel	

=== Newt Gingrich (withdrawn) ===
Statesmen, former politicians, and celebrities	Party	Endorsement	Date	Notes	Reference
André Bauer	Republican	Newt Gingrich (withdrawn)	November 28, 2011	Former Lieutenant Governor of South Carolina	
Ralph Hudgens	Republican	Newt Gingrich (withdrawn)	August 26, 2011	Georgia Insurance Commissioner	
Lauren "Bubba" McDonald	Republican	Newt Gingrich (withdrawn)	August 26, 2011	Georgia Public Service Commissioner	
Zell Miller	Democrat	Newt Gingrich (withdrawn)	August 26, 2011	Former governor and former U.S. senator from Georgia	
Chuck Norris	Republican	Newt Gingrich (withdrawn)	January 20, 2012	martial artist and actor	
Allen Olson	Republican	Newt Gingrich (withdrawn)	September 13, 2011	Chairman of the Columbia Tea Party (South Carolina)	
Carl Paladino	Republican	Newt Gingrich (withdrawn)	January 22, 2012	2010 Republican nominee for Governor of New York	
Todd Palin	Independent	Newt Gingrich (withdrawn)	1.9.2012	Husband of former Alaska Governor and 2008 vice-presidential nominee of the Republican Party, Sarah Palin	
Sonny Perdue	Republican	Newt Gingrich (withdrawn)	August 26, 2011	Former Governor of Georgia	
Judson Phillips	Republican	Newt Gingrich (withdrawn)	September 26, 2011	Founder of Tea Party Nation	
Michael Reagan	Republican	Newt Gingrich (withdrawn)	January 20, 2012	Former radio host and Republican strategist	
Fred Thompson	Republican	Newt Gingrich (withdrawn)	January 27, 2012	Former U.S. Senator from Tennessee, 2008 presidential candidate	
Stan Wise	Republican	Newt Gingrich (withdrawn)	August 26, 2011	Georgia Public Service Commissioner	

=== Jon Huntsman (withdrawn) ===
Statesmen, former politicians, and celebrities	Party	Endorsement	Date	Notes	Reference
Jeb Bush Jr.	Republican	Jon Huntsman (withdrawn)	8.10.2011	Son of former Florida Governor Jeb Bush and nephew of former President George W. Bush	
Mike Campbell	Republican	Jon Huntsman (withdrawn)	May 16, 2011	South Carolina campaign chair for Mike Huckabee's Campaign in 2008, and son of late Governor Carroll Campbell	
Jim Cason	Republican	Jon Huntsman (withdrawn)	August 17, 2011	Mayor of Coral Gables, Florida	
Lew Cramer		Jon Huntsman (withdrawn)		President of Utah World Trade Center	
David Currier	Republican	Jon Huntsman (withdrawn)	July 26, 2011	Former New Hampshire state senator	
Max Eden	Republican	Jon Huntsman (withdrawn)	6.3.2011	Co-founder of "Students for Daniels" which had encouraged Mitch Daniels to run for president in 2012.	
Craig Haffner		Jon Huntsman (withdrawn)		Broadway and television producer	
Michael Knowles	Republican	Jon Huntsman (withdrawn)	6.3.2011	co-founder of "Students for Daniels"	
Stewart Lamprey	Republican	Jon Huntsman (withdrawn)	July 26, 2011	Former New Hampshire state Senate President and former state House Speaker	
John J. Mack		Jon Huntsman (withdrawn)		Former CEO & Chairman of Morgan Stanley	
Henry McMaster	Republican	Jon Huntsman (withdrawn)		Former attorney general of South Carolina (2003–2011)	
Ana Navarro	Republican	Jon Huntsman (withdrawn)	8.10.2011	Director of Immigration policy for former Florida governor Jeb Bush and Ambassador to the United Nations Human Rights Commission	
Tom Ridge	Republican	Jon Huntsman (withdrawn)	September 16, 2011	Former United States Secretary of Homeland Security under George W. Bush (2001–2005), former governor of Pennsylvania, and former congressman	
Rob Wasinger	Republican	Jon Huntsman (withdrawn)		Campaign Manager for Sam Brownback's Campaign in 2008	
Alan Wilson	Republican	Jon Huntsman (withdrawn)	August 29, 2011	Attorney General of South Carolina and son of United States Representative Joe Wilson	

=== Ron Paul ===
Statesmen, former politicians, and celebrities	Party	Endorsement	Date	Notes	Reference
Chuck Baldwin	Republican	Ron Paul		2008 Constitution Party presidential candidate	
Scott Banister		Ron Paul		Entrepreneur, angel investor	
Christopher R. Barron	Republican	Ron Paul		Member of the board of directors and co-founder of GOProud; Originally endorsed Herman Cain and Gary Johnson	
Patrick M. Byrne		Ron Paul		CEO of Overstock.com	
Kelly Clarkson		Ron Paul	December 29, 2011	American singer-songwriter and actress; later supported Barack Obama.	
Jerry Doyle		Ron Paul	December 20, 2011	Radio host	
Barry Goldwater Jr.	Republican	Ron Paul		Former Member of the U.S. House of Representatives from California's 27th and the 20th district	
Alex Jones	Constitutionalist	Ron Paul	4.11.2011	Radio host, actor, and filmmaker	
KRS-One		Ron Paul		Rapper	
Juliette Lewis		Ron Paul	1.10.2012	American actress and singer	
Barry Manilow		Ron Paul	September 16, 2011	American singer-songwriter; later supported Obama	
Russell Means	Libertarian	Ron Paul	January 23, 2012	Oglala Lakota political activist, actor, musician and writer	
Andrew Napolitano	Libertarian	Ron Paul	August 22, 2011	Political and legal analyst	
Prodigy		Ron Paul	May 17, 2011	Rapper	
Dylan Ratigan	Democrat	Ron Paul		Television host	
Paul Craig Roberts	Republican	Ron Paul		Former Assistant Secretary of the Treasury for Economic Policy	
Joe Rogan		Ron Paul		TV and Radio host	
Jim Rogers		Ron Paul		Investor	
Joe Scarborough	Republican	Ron Paul		Former Member of the U.S. House of Representatives from Florida's 1st district	
Michael Scheuer	Republican	Ron Paul		Former Chief of the Bin Laden Issue Station from 1996 to 1999, and Special Advisor to the CIA's bin Laden unit from September 2001 to November 2004.	
Nicole Scherzinger	Democratic	Ron Paul		American singer, later endorsed Barack Obama	
Peter Schiff	Republican	Ron Paul		CEO of Euro Pacific Capital	
Doug Stanhope	Republican	Ron Paul	May 16, 2011	Stand-up comedian	
John Stossel	Libertarian	Ron Paul	June 30, 2011	Media pundit	
Andrew Sullivan		Ron Paul	December 15, 2011	political writer	
Peter Thiel	Libertarian	Ron Paul		PayPal co-founder	
Vince Vaughn	Republican	Ron Paul		Actor	
Jesse Ventura		Ron Paul		Former governor of Minnesota, TV show host, Navy SEAL and professional wrestler	

=== Rick Perry (withdrawn) ===
Statesmen, former politicians, and celebrities	Party	Endorsement	Date	Notes	Reference
Dean Cain	Republican	Rick Perry (withdrawn)		Actor known for playing Clark Kent/Superman in the TV Series Lois & Clark: The New Adventures of Superman	
Ted Cruz	Republican	Rick Perry (withdrawn)		Former Solicitor General of Texas (2003–2008)	
Steve Forbes	Republican	Rick Perry (withdrawn)		Businessman, CEO of Forbes, Inc., and 2000 Republican Presidential contender	
Kinky Friedman	Independent	Rick Perry (withdrawn)		Former Independent candidate for Governor of Texas in 2006, country singer, mystery author, and self-proclaimed Jewish cowboy	
James R. Leininger	Republican	Rick Perry (withdrawn)		Entrepreneur and philanthropist	
Van Poole	Republican	Rick Perry (withdrawn)		Former chairman of the Florida Republican Party from 1989 to 1993.	
David Wilkins	Republican	Rick Perry (withdrawn)		Former Speaker of the South Carolina House of Representatives and former Ambassador to Canada	

=== Mitt Romney ===
Statesmen, former politicians, and celebrities	Party	Endorsement	Date	Notes	Reference
Robert Bork		Mitt Romney	8.2.2011	Jurist/Former Solicitor General/Author	
Jeb Bush	Republican	Mitt Romney	March 21, 2012	Former Governor of Florida, the son of former President George H. W. Bush, and the younger brother of former President George W. Bush	
Cindy Crawford		Mitt Romney		Supermodel	
John Danforth	Republican	Mitt Romney	12.2.2011	Former United States Ambassador to the United Nations and former United States Senator from Missouri	
Clint Eastwood	Libertarian	Mitt Romney	8.3.2012	Academy Award-winning director, actor, and former mayor of Carmel-by-the-Sea, California. A strong proponent of the Second Amendment and the NRA.	
Carly Fiorina	Republican	Mitt Romney	March 26, 2012	Former Hewlett-Packard CEO and 2010 Republican California Senatorial nominee.	
Rudy Giuliani	Republican	Mitt Romney	April 23, 2012	Former New York City Mayor and 2008 presidential candidate	
Dan Jansen		Mitt Romney		Retired speed skater	
Brad Little	Republican	Mitt Romney		Lieutenant Governor of Idaho	
Daniel S. Loeb		Mitt Romney		Hedge fund manager; shareholder activist	
Christine O'Donnell	Republican	Mitt Romney	December 13, 2011	Republican Delaware Senatorial nominee in 2008 and 2010.	
Robert Ray	Republican	Mitt Romney	12.2.2011	Former Governor of Iowa	
Nancy Reagan	Republican	Mitt Romney	May 31, 2012	Former First Lady of the United States under President Ronald Reagan	
Donald Trump	Independent	Mitt Romney	February 2, 2012	An American business magnate, television personality and author. Future President of the United States.	
Lech Wałęsa		Mitt Romney	July 31, 2012	Iconic leader and past president of Poland.	
Meg Whitman	Republican	Mitt Romney		2010 Republican nominee for Governor of California, former eBay CEO and current Hewlett-Packard CEO; also a business associate of Romney's at Bain Capital	

=== Rick Santorum (withdrawn) ===
Statesmen, former politicians, and celebrities	Party	Endorsement	Date	Notes	Reference
Sharron Angle	Republican	Rick Santorum (withdrawn)	2.1.2012	Former Nevada state assemblywoman and 2010 Republican Nevada Senatorial nominee.	
Ron Crane	Republican	Rick Santorum (withdrawn)	February 14, 2012	Idaho State Treasurer	
Mike DeWine	Republican	Rick Santorum (withdrawn)	February 17, 2012	Former Ohio state Senator, former Lieutenant Governor of Ohio, former U.S. Representative, former U.S. Senator, and current Ohio Attorney General. Originally endorsed Mitt Romney.	
Dave Mustaine		Rick Santorum (withdrawn)	February 14, 2012	Rock star; frontman of the band Megadeth and former guitarist of the band Metallica	
Jane Norton	Republican	Rick Santorum (withdrawn)	2.1.2012	Former Lieutenant Governor of Colorado	
Bob Schaffer	Republican	Rick Santorum (withdrawn)	2.1.2012	Former U.S. congressman (R-CO)	
Michael W. Smith	Republican	Rick Santorum (withdrawn)	3.12.2012	An American contemporary Christian music artist, 3-time Grammy Award winner and 40-time recipient of the Dove Awards	
Tom Tancredo	Constitutionalist	Rick Santorum (withdrawn)	2.1.2012	Former U.S. congressman (R-CO), 2008 presidential candidate, and 2010 Colorado gubernatorial candidate. Originally endorsed Herman Cain.	

== See also ==
- Republican Party presidential primaries, 2012
