= Idaho's 33rd legislative district =

American legislative district

- A map of the 33rd legislative district
Senator
Dave Lent; R–Idaho Falls
since 2018
Representative
Barbara Ehardt; R–Idaho Falls
since 2017
Marco Erickson; R–Idaho Falls
since 2020
- Demographics: 80.93% White; 0.75% Black; 16.6% Hispanic; 1.43% Native American; 7.56% Other
- Population (2020): 51,585
- Registered voters (2025): 23,381

Idaho's 33rd legislative district is one of 35 districts of the Idaho Legislature. It contains most of the city of Idaho Falls and is one of three districts in Bonneville County

It is currently represented by Senator Dave Lent, Republican of Idaho Falls, Representative Barbara Ehardt, Republican of Idaho Falls, and Representative Marco Erickson, Republican of Idaho Falls.

== District profile ==
=== 1992–2002 ===
From 1992 to 2002, District 33 consisted of a portion of Bannock County.

Legislature	Session	Senate	House Seat A	House Seat B
51st (1992 - 1994)	1st	Mary Lloyd (D)	John Alexander (D)	Millie Flandro (D)
51st (1992 - 1994)	2nd	Mary Lloyd (D)	John Alexander (D)	Millie Flandro (D)
52nd (1994 - 1996)	1st	Lin Whitworth (D)	John Alexander (D)	Millie Flandro (D)
52nd (1994 - 1996)	2nd	Lin Whitworth (D)	John Alexander (D)	Millie Flandro (D)
53rd (1996 - 1998)	1st	Lin Whitworth (D)	John Alexander (D)	Roger Chase (D)
53rd (1996 - 1998)	2nd	Lin Whitworth (D)	John Alexander (D)	Roger Chase (D)
54th (1998 - 2000)	1st	Lin Whitworth (D)	Bert Marley (D)	Roger Chase (D)
54th (1998 - 2000)	2nd	Lin Whitworth (D)	Bert Marley (D)	Roger Chase (D)
55th (2000 - 2002)	1st	Lin Whitworth (D)	Bert Marley (D)	Roger Chase (D)
55th (2000 - 2002)	2nd	Bert Marley (D)	Elmer Martinez (D)	Elaine Smith (D)

=== 2002–2012 ===
From 2002 to 2012, District 33 consisted of a portion of Bonneville County.

Legislature	Session	Senate	House Seat A	House Seat B
57th (2002 - 2004)	1st	Bart Davis (R)	Jack Barraclough (R)	Lee Gagner (R)
57th (2002 - 2004)	2nd	Bart Davis (R)	Jack Barraclough (R)	Lee Gagner (R)
58th (2004 - 2006)	1st	Bart Davis (R)	Jack Barraclough (R)	Russ Matthews (R)
58th (2004 - 2006)	2nd	Bart Davis (R)	Jack Barraclough (R)	Russ Matthews (R)
59th (2006 - 2008)	1st	Bart Davis (R)	Jerry Shively (D)	Russ Matthews (R)
59th (2006 - 2008)	2nd	Bart Davis (R)	Jerry Shively (D)	Russ Matthews (R)
60th (2008 - 2010)	1st	Bart Davis (R)	Jeff Thompson (R)	Russ Matthews (R)
60th (2008 - 2010)	2nd	Bart Davis (R)	Jeff Thompson (R)	Russ Matthews (R)
61st (2010 - 2012)	1st	Bart Davis (R)	Jeff Thompson (R)	Linden Bateman (R)
61st (2010 - 2012)	2nd	Bart Davis (R)	Jeff Thompson (R)	Linden Bateman (R)

=== 2012–present ===
District 33 currently consists of a portion of Bonneville County.

Legislature	Session	Senate	House Seat A	House Seat B
62nd (2012 - 2014)	1st	Bart Davis (R)	Janet Trujillo (R)	Linden Bateman (R)
62nd (2012 - 2014)	2nd	Bart Davis (R)	Janet Trujillo (R)	Linden Bateman (R)
63rd (2014 - 2016)	1st	Bart Davis (R)	Janet Trujillo (R)	Linden Bateman (R)
63rd (2014 - 2016)	2nd	Bart Davis (R)	Janet Trujillo (R)	Linden Bateman (R)
64th (2016 - 2018)	1st	Bart Davis (R)	Janet Trujillo (R)	Bryan Zollinger (R)
64th (2016 - 2018)	2nd	Tony Potts (R)	Barbara Ehardt (R)	Bryan Zollinger (R)
65th (2018 - 2020)	1st	David Lent (R)	Barbara Ehardt (R)	Bryan Zollinger (R)
65th (2018 - 2020)	2nd	David Lent (R)	Barbara Ehardt (R)	Bryan Zollinger (R)
66th (2020 - 2022)	1st	David Lent (R)	Barbara Ehardt (R)	Marco Erickson (R)
66th (2020 - 2022)	2nd	David Lent (R)	Barbara Ehardt (R)	Marco Erickson (R)
67th (2022 - 2024)	1st	David Lent (R)	Barbara Ehardt (R)	Marco Erickson (R)
67th (2022 - 2024)	2nd	David Lent (R)	Barbara Ehardt (R)	Marco Erickson (R)
68th (2024-2026)	1st	David Lent (R)	Barbara Ehardt (R)	Marco Erickson (R)

== See also ==
- List of Idaho senators
- List of Idaho representatives
