= Senator Potts (disambiguation) =

Richard Potts (1753–1808) was a U.S. Senator from Maryland from 1793 to 1796. Senator Potts may also refer to:

- Andrew R. Potts (1853–1932), Wisconsin State Senate
- Benjamin F. Potts (1836–1887), Ohio State Senate
- Frederic A. Potts (1836–1888), New Jersey State Senate
- Russ Potts (born 1939), Virginia State Senate
- Tony Potts (politician) (born 1970s), Idaho State Senate
