= Idaho Freedom Foundation =

Conservative libertarian think tank

- Established: 2009
- President: Ronald M. Nate
- Budget: Revenue: $833,000; Expenses: $1.07 million (FYE December 2023)
- Subsidiaries: Idaho Reporter
- Location: Boise, Idaho
- Website: idahofreedom.org

The Idaho Freedom Foundation (IFF) is a conservative and libertarian think tank located in Boise, Idaho. Ronald M. Nate has served as the organization's president since January 2024.

== Founding ==
IFF was begun in 2009 by Wayne Hoffman, who had been the Canyon County Republican Party vice chairman and spokesman for U.S. Rep. Bill Sali. Formerly, Hoffman was a newspaper reporter for the Idaho Statesman, leaving in 2005, and before that had worked for the South Idaho Press in Burley, the Idaho Press Tribune in Nampa, and a southern Idaho radio station.

== Issues and influence ==
The IFF is influential within the Idaho Legislature and the state's broader politics. Politico described the IFF as "an arch-conservative group that has driven challenges to so-called RINO politicians in the state." The IFF's website says it works to defeat "the state’s socialist public policies." Its Freedom Index rates Idaho legislators on their votes.

In 2012, the IFF was one of the chief opponents of an Idaho state legislative bill that would have placed restrictions on tanning bed usage. In 2013 and 2014, IFF put up billboards criticizing Idaho legislators for their votes to implement a state health insurance exchange.

In October 2020, the IFF published a video questioning the existence of the COVID-19 pandemic and decrying governmental measures to combat the spread of the pandemic. Several Idaho Republican elected officials, including Janice McGeachin and a number of state legislators, appeared in the video.

In 2021, the organization criticized Boise State University for holding a "Black Graduation" meant to celebrate Black students in addition to the traditional graduation ceremony. IFF called the event "segregationist." It has urged Idaho lawmakers to cut funding to Boise State.

In a December 2021 opinion editorial published in the Post Register, former Idaho attorney general and former chief justice of the Idaho Supreme Court Jim Jones criticized the IFF, writing "It's time to clean Idaho's House of disruptive lawmakers who worship at the Freedom Foundation altar and ignore their duty to act responsibly in the interests of their voters."

== Legal challenges ==
The IFF has mounted various legal challenges to state and city laws and regulations.

- In 2009, IFF was successful in requiring officials from Coeur d'Alene, Idaho, to release public records in regards to the names, genders, salaries of all public employees.
- In 2014, IFF and the American Civil Liberties Union threatened legal action against Boise State University when the school required a student group to pay security fees for bringing a pro-gun speaker to campus. Boise State refunded the student group the cost of the security fees.
- In 2015, IFF sued the Boise School District over its contract with a local teachers union, the Boise Education Association. The case was dismissed due to lack of standing.
- In 2016, IFF Board Chair Brent Regan and IFF sued Butch Otter and others about Idaho's Common Core State Standards Initiative testing. The case was dismissed due to the lack of standing by the plaintiffs.
- In 2019, IFF Board Chair Brent Regan sued Lawerence Denney, arguing that Medicaid expansion was unconstitutional in part because it delegated lawmaking authority to the federal government. The case was dismissed due to the ruling that the foundation of the lawsuit lacked a basis in the law.
- In 2019, IFF sued Boise due to the establishment of two new urban renewal districts which prevents cities from taking on debt or liabilities without a super-majority of voter approval. The case was dismissed and appealed where it was upheld.

== Funding ==
The organization has received funding from Donors Trust and Donors Capital Fund, two donor-advised funds which are not required to disclose their donors. IFF is a member of the State Policy Network, a consortium of conservative and libertarian think tanks that focus on state-level policy.
