= Wendy J. Olson =

American lawyer

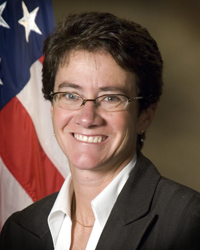

United States Attorney for the District of Idaho
- In office June 25, 2010 – February 25, 2017
- President: Barack Obama; Donald Trump
- Preceded by: Thomas E. Moss
- Succeeded by: Bart Davis

Personal details
- Born: Wendy Jo Olson; July 1964 (age 62) Pocatello, Idaho, U.S.
- Spouse: Craig Kreiser
- Children: 2
- Education: Drake University (BA); Stanford University (JD)

Wendy J. Olson (born 1964) is an American lawyer who served as a United States attorney for the District of Idaho from 2010 to 2017. She was appointed in 2010 by President Barack Obama, replacing Thomas E. Moss. As one of 93 United States attorneys, she represented the government in all civil and criminal cases within her district.

== Early life and education ==
Olson was born in Pocatello, Idaho. Olson attended Drake University in Des Moines, Iowa, graduating with a Bachelor of Arts degree in journalism in 1986. She served as an intern in the sports department of the Los Angeles Times before leaving to attend Stanford Law School in Palo Alto, California. She graduated from Stanford with a Juris Doctor in 1990. She interned with Wilmer Cutler Pickering Hale and Dorr, the Student Press Law Center, and the Media Access Project.

== Career ==
Olson served as a law clerk for Judge Barbara Jacobs Rothstein on the United States District Court for the Western District of Washington for two years immediately after finishing law school. She served as a trial attorney and later deputy director of the National Church Arson Task Force in the United States Department of Justice Civil Rights Division from 1992 to 1997. From 1994 to 1997, she also worked part-time as an adjunct professor at George Washington University Law School.

In 1997, Olson joined the Office of the United States Attorney for the District of Idaho, rising to the rank of Senior Litigation Counsel at the time of her appointment in 2010.

After Olson resigned in 2017, she joined the Boise office of Stoel Rives, a law firm that operates in the Pacific Northwest. In 2021, Olson was included on a shortlist of possible nominees to succeed Judge B. Lynn Winmill.

In 2024, Olson made national headlines when she represented Eric Posey, who accused a far-right blogger of defamation after she falsely claimed he had exposed himself to a crowd, including children, during a Pride event in June 2022. A Kootenai County jury awarded Posey more than $1.1 million.

Political offices
Preceded by Thomas E. Moss	United States Attorney for the District of Idaho; 2010–2017	Succeeded by Bart Davis
