= Janet Trujillo =

American politician from Idaho

Member of the Idaho State Tax Commission
- Incumbent
- Assumed office December 2017

Member of the Idaho House of Representatives from the 33rd district
- In office December 1, 2012 – December 6, 2017
- Preceded by: Jeff Thompson
- Succeeded by: Barbara Ehardt

Personal details
- Born: Salt Lake City, Utah, U.S.
- Party: Republican
- Spouses: Lowell Trujillo (div. 2016); Mike Moyle (m. 2016)
- Education: Salt Lake Community College

Janet Trujillo is an American politician from Idaho. Trujillo served as a Republican member of Idaho House of Representatives for District 33 from 2012 to 2017. Since leaving the House, Trujillo has served as a commissioner of the Idaho State Tax Commission.

== Early life and education ==
Trujillo was born in Salt Lake City, Utah. Trujillo graduated from Hillcrest High School in Utah. Trujillo earned a certificate in dental assisting from Jordan Technical College and studied business management at Salt Lake Community College in Utah.

== Career ==
Trujillo was a certified tax appraiser for Bonneville County, Idaho.

On November 6, 2012, Trujillo won the election and to the Idaho House of Representatives for District 33 seat A. Trujillo defeated Christopher Joseph Brunt and Mary E. Haley with 60.9% of the votes. She was re-elected in 2014, defeat John Boyd Radford with 57.5% of the votes. She was again re-elected in 2016, defeating Jim De Angelis with 65.8% of the votes.

In December 2017, during Trujillo's third term as a legislator, she was appointed as a commissioner of Idaho State Tax Commission by Governor Butch Otter. Trujillo replaced Rich Jackson. Trujillo's term is expected to end in December 2023. Barbara Ehardt was appointed to succeed Trujillo's term in Idaho House.

== Election history ==
District 33 House Seat A - Part of Bonneville County
Year	Candidate	Votes	Pct	Candidate	Votes	Pct	Candidate	Votes	Pct
2012 Primary	Janet Trujillo	1,922	52.0%	Ronald Lechelt	1,777	48.0%			
2012 General	Janet Trujillo	10,392	60.9%	Mary Haley	5,521	32.3%	Christopher Brunt	1,160	6.8%
2014 Primary	Janet Trujillo (incumbent)	3,489	100%						
2014 General	Janet Trujillo (incumbent)	6,227	57.5%	John Radford	4,606	42.5%			
2016 Primary	Janet Trujillo (incumbent)	2,286	100%						
2016 General	Janet Trujillo (incumbent)	10,510	65.8%	Jim De Angelis	5,463	34.2%			

== Personal life ==
Trujillo's second husband was Lowell Trujillo. They are divorced.

In December 2016, Trujillo married Mike Moyle, a politician in Idaho. They have four children. Trujillo and her husband live in Star, Idaho.
