= Douglas Hancey =

American politician from Idaho

Member of the Idaho House of Representatives from District 34 Seat A
- In office December 1, 2012 – December 1, 2014
- Preceded by: Mack Shirley
- Succeeded by: Ronald M. Nate

Personal details
- Born: Logan, Utah
- Party: Republican
- Education: Brigham Young University
- Occupation: Politician

Douglas A. Hancey, Jr. (born in Logan, Utah) is a Republican Idaho State Representative since 2012 representing District 34 in the A seat.

== Education ==
Hancey earned his BS in accounting from Brigham Young University.

== Elections ==
- 2012 When Republican Representative Mack G. Shirley retired and left the District 34 A seat open, Hancey won the three-way May 15, 2012 Republican Primary with 1,997 votes (46.2%), and won the November 6, 2012 General election with 13,424 votes (79.7%) against Democratic nominee Lary Larson.
