= Jeff Thompson (Idaho politician) =

American politician

Member of the Idaho House of Representatives from the 30A district
- In office December 1, 2012 – December 1, 2018
- Preceded by: Roy Lacey
- Succeeded by: Gary Marshall

Member of the Idaho House of Representatives from the 33rd district
- In office December 1, 2008 – December 1, 2012
- Preceded by: Jerry Shively
- Succeeded by: Janet Trujillo

Personal details
- Born: September 16, 1963 (age 62) Harlingen, Texas, U.S.
- Party: Republican
- Education: Liberty University (BS, MBA); Idaho State University (MS)
- Website: thompsonforidaho.com

Jeffrey D. "Jeff" Thompson (born September 16, 1963) is an American politician who served as a member of the Idaho House of Representatives from 2008 to 2018.

== Education ==
Thompson earned a Bachelor of Science in business administration and finance from Liberty University, a Master of Science in human resource training and development from Idaho State University, and then a Master of Business Administration from Liberty University.

== Career ==
Prior to entering politics, Thompson worked as a consultant for the Idaho National Laboratory.

Thompson was elected to the Idaho House of Representatives for the first time in November 2008 and assumed office on December 1, 2008. He served until 2012. He then represented the 30th district in the House from 2012 to 2018. Thompson lost re-election in the May 2018 Republican primary to Gary Marshall, taking only 40% of the vote.

In the 2012 Republican Party presidential candidates, Thompson supported Mitt Romney. In the 2016 Republican Party presidential primaries, Thompson supported Senator Marco Rubio.

In 2018, Thompson ran against incumbent Mayor Rebecca Casper and Barbara Ehardt for mayor of Idaho Falls, Idaho. Thompson finished third and did not qualify for the runoff election.

Thompson was a candidate in both the 2026 Kentucky House of Representatives election for Kentucky's 45th House district and the 2026 Idaho House of Representatives election for Idaho's 33rd House district seat B, but withdraw prior to both of the Republican primaries.

== Election history ==
House District 30, Seat A
Year	Candidate	Votes	Pct	Candidate	Votes	Pct
2008 Primary	Jeff Thompson	1,682	100%			
2008 General	Jeff Thompson	7,465	50.9%	Jerry Shively (incumbent)	7,195	49.1%
2010 Primary	Jeff Thompson (incumbent)	3,078	100%			
2010 General	Jeff Thompson (incumbent)	5,411	52.6%	Jerry Shively	4,881	47.4%

House District 33, Seat A
Year	Candidate	Votes	Pct	Candidate	Votes	Pct
2012 Primary	Jeff Thompson (incumbent)	3,341	86.8%	Trimelda Concepcion McDaniels	507	13.2%
2012 General	Jeff Thompson (incumbent)	14,533	83.4%	David Hay	2,884	16.6%
2014 Primary	Jeff Thompson (incumbent)	2,431	51.1%	Stephen J. Yates	2,323	48.9%
2014 General	Jeff Thompson (incumbent)	9,262	84.0%	David Hay	1,768	16.0%
2016 Primary	Jeff Thompson (incumbent)	3,080	100%			
2016 General	Jeff Thompson (incumbent)	15,295	77.0%	Matt Dance	4,561	23.0%
