= Britt Raybould =

American politician

President of National Potato Council
- Incumbent
- Assumed office January 2020

Member of the Idaho House of Representatives from District 34 Seat B
- Incumbent
- Assumed office December 1, 2022
- Preceded by: Ronald M. Nate
- In office December 1, 2018 – November 30, 2020
- Preceded by: Dell Raybould
- Succeeded by: Ronald M. Nate

Personal details
- Born: Idaho
- Party: Republican
- Relatives: Dell Raybould (grandfather)
- Education: Boise State University, Westminster College
- Occupation: CFO, politician
- Known for: First woman President of National Potato Council

Britt Raybould is an American CFO and politician from Idaho. Raybould is a member of Idaho House of Representatives from District 34, seat B. Raybould is the first woman president of National Potato Council.

== Early life and education ==
Raybould was born in Idaho. Raybould is a fourth-generation Idahoan. Raybould's father is Jeff Raybould, a farmer. Raybould's mother is Vickie Raybould. Raybould's grandfather is Dell Raybould, a former politician. Raybould's grandmother is Vera Raybould. In 1997, Raybould graduated from Sugar-Salem High School. In 2001, Raybould earned a Bachelor of Arts degree in English from Boise State University. In 2003, Raybould earned a master's degree in communication from Westminster College in Salt Lake City, Utah.

== Career ==
In 2016, Raybould became the chief financial officer of Raybould Brothers Farms, a potato farm in Idaho.

In January 2020, Raybould became the president of National Potato Council. Raybould is also the first woman president of National Potato Council. Raybould succeeded Larry Alsum.

== Political career ==
In 2001, Raybould's political career began when she became an intern for Dirk Kempthorne, governor of Idaho.

Madison County Republican Youth Committeeperson (2015 – 2020)

Idaho Republican Party Region 7 Secretary (2016 – 2018)

== Elections ==
=== 2022 ===
Raybould ran against incumbent Ron Nate, and won the primary with 50.3% to Nate's 49.7% - a slim 36 vote margin. Raybould is unopposed in the general election.

=== 2020 ===
Raybould was defeated by past Idaho legislator Ronald M. Nate taking only 47.79% of the vote.

=== 2018 ===
Raybould defeated Elaine King and Marshall H. Merrell with 44.2% of the vote to replace her retiring grandfather Dell Raybould. Raybould was unopposed in the general election.

== Awards ==
2020 Spudwoman of the Year. Sponsored by Lockwood Equipment.

== Personal life ==
Raybould lives in Plano, Idaho. In 2020, Raybould's hometown is St. Anthony, Idaho.
