= Idaho's 34th legislative district =

American legislative district

Idaho's 34th legislative district is one of 35 districts of the Idaho Legislature. It is currently represented by Senator Brent Hill, Republican of Rexburg, Representative Doug Ricks, Republican of Rexburg, and Representative Britt Raybould, Republican of Rexburg.

== District profile ==
=== 2012–present ===
District 34 currently consists of all of Madison County and a portion of Bonneville County.

Legislature	Session	Senate	House Seat A	House Seat B
62nd (2012 - 2014)	1st	Brent Hill (R)	Douglas Hancey (R)	Dell Raybould (R)
62nd (2012 - 2014)	2nd	Brent Hill (R)	Douglas Hancey (R)	Dell Raybould (R)
63rd (2014 - 2016)	1st	Brent Hill (R)	Ronald M. Nate (R)	Dell Raybould (R)
63rd (2014 - 2016)	2nd	Brent Hill (R)	Ronald M. Nate (R)	Dell Raybould (R)
64th (2016 - 2018)	1st	Brent Hill (R)	Ronald M. Nate (R)	Dell Raybould (R)
64th (2016 - 2018)	2nd	Brent Hill (R)	Ronald M. Nate (R)	Dell Raybould (R)
65th (2018 - 2020)	1st	Brent Hill (R)	Doug Ricks (R)	Britt Raybould (R)
65th (2018 - 2020)	2nd	Brent Hill (R)	Doug Ricks (R)	Britt Raybould (R)
66th (2020 - 2022)	1st	Doug Ricks (R)	Jon Weber (R)	Ronald M. Nate (R)
66th (2020 - 2022)	2nd	Doug Ricks (R)	Jon Weber (R)	Ronald M. Nate (R)

=== 2002–2012 ===
From 2002 to 2012, District 34 consisted of all of Madison County and a portion of Fremont County.

Legislature	Session	Senate	House Seat A	House Seat B
57th (2002 - 2004)	1st	Brent Hill (R)	Mack Shirley (R)	Dell Raybould (R)
57th (2002 - 2004)	2nd	Brent Hill (R)	Mack Shirley (R)	Dell Raybould (R)
58th (2004 - 2006)	1st	Brent Hill (R)	Mack Shirley (R)	Dell Raybould (R)
58th (2004 - 2006)	2nd	Brent Hill (R)	Mack Shirley (R)	Dell Raybould (R)
59th (2006 - 2008)	1st	Brent Hill (R)	Mack Shirley (R)	Dell Raybould (R)
59th (2006 - 2008)	2nd	Brent Hill (R)	Mack Shirley (R)	Dell Raybould (R)
60th (2008 - 2010)	1st	Brent Hill (R)	Mack Shirley (R)	Dell Raybould (R)
60th (2008 - 2010)	2nd	Brent Hill (R)	Mack Shirley (R)	Dell Raybould (R)
61st (2010 - 2012)	1st	Brent Hill (R)	Mack Shirley (R)	Dell Raybould (R)
61st (2010 - 2012)	2nd	Brent Hill (R)	Mack Shirley (R)	Dell Raybould (R)

=== 1992–2002 ===
From 1992 to 2002, District 34 consisted of a portion of Bannock County.

Legislature	Session	Senate	House Seat A	House Seat B
51st (1992 - 1994)	1st	Evan Frasure (R)	Elaine Hofman (D)	Pete Black (D)
51st (1992 - 1994)	2nd	Evan Frasure (R)	Elaine Hofman (D)	Pete Black (D)
52nd (1994 - 1996)	1st	Evan Frasure (R)	Elaine Hofman (D)	Pete Black (D)
52nd (1994 - 1996)	2nd	Evan Frasure (R)	Elaine Hofman (D)	Pete Black (D)
53rd (1996 - 1998)	1st	Evan Frasure (R)	Donna Boe (R)	Kent Kunz (R)
53rd (1996 - 1998)	2nd	Evan Frasure (R)	Donna Boe (R)	Kent Kunz (R)
54th (1998 - 2000)	1st	Evan Frasure (R)	Donna Boe (R)	Kent Kunz (R)
54th (1998 - 2000)	2nd	Evan Frasure (R)	Donna Boe (R)	Kent Kunz (R)
55th (2000 - 2002)	1st	Evan Frasure (R)	Donna Boe (R)	Kent Kunz (R)
55th (2000 - 2002)	2nd	Evan Frasure (R)	Donna Boe (R)	Kent Kunz (R)

=== 1984–1992 ===
From 1984 to 1992, District 34 did not exist.

== See also ==
- List of Idaho senators
- List of Idaho representatives
