= Doug Ricks =

American politician from Idaho

Member of the Idaho Senate from the 34th district
- Incumbent
- Assumed office December 1, 2020
- Preceded by: Brent Hill

Member of the Idaho House of Representatives from the 34th district
- In office December 1, 2018 – November 30, 2020
- Preceded by: Ronald M. Nate
- Succeeded by: Jon Weber

Personal details
- Born: Madison County, Idaho, U.S.
- Party: Republican
- Spouse: Melissa
- Children: 5
- Parents: Mark Ricks (father); Evelyn Ricks (mother)
- Education: Ricks College (AS); Brigham Young University–Idaho (BA)

Douglas Ricks is an American businessman and politician serving as a Republican member of the Idaho Senate from the 34th district. Ricks previously served in the Idaho House of Representatives from 2018 to 2020.

== Early life and education ==
Ricks was born in Madison County, Idaho, and is the son of Evelyn and Mark Ricks. He grew up on a potato farm and attended Madison High School.

Ricks earned an associate degree in general agriculture and farm crop management and a Bachelor of Arts from Brigham Young University–Idaho.

== Career ==
As a businessman, in 1987, Ricks became the owner of a computer store in Rexburg, Idaho. In 2000, Ricks became a computer lab manager at Brigham Young University–Idaho.

Ricks is an Assistive Technology Coordinator at Brigham Young University–Idaho's Disability Services Office.

In 2016, Ricks ran for seat 34A in the Idaho House of Representatives, but lost the Republican primary to Ronald M. Nate.

In 2018, Ricks defeated Nate in the primary. On November 6, 2018, Ricks won the general election unopposed.

Ricks served on the following House committees:

- Judiciary, Rules & Administration
- Revenue & Taxation
- Transportation & Defense

In 2020, Ricks announced his candidacy for District 34 in the Idaho State Senate, after Idaho Senator Brent Hill decided not to seek reelection. Ricks defeated Jacob Householder in the Republican primary and was unopposed in the general election.

As of January 2021, Ricks serves on the following Senate committees:

- Judiciary & Rules – Vice Chair
- Agricultural Affairs
- Local Government & Taxation

== Electoral history ==
=== 2016 ===
2016 Republican primary: Idaho House of Representatives, Seat 34A
Party	Candidate	Votes	%
Republican	Ronald M. Nate	2,632	51.64%
Republican	Doug Ricks	2,465	48.36%

=== 2018 ===
2018 Republican primary: Idaho House of Representatives, Seat 34A
Party	Candidate	Votes	%
Republican	Doug Ricks	2,993	51.4%
Republican	Ronald M. Nate	2,834	48.6%

=== 2020 ===
2020 Republican primary: Idaho State Senate, District 34
Party	Candidate	Votes	%
Republican	Doug Ricks	4,608	70.0%
Republican	Jacob Householder	1,976	30.0%

== Personal life ==
Ricks' wife is Melissa Ricks. They have five children. Ricks and his family live in Rexburg, Idaho.
