= Ronald M. Nate =

American politician from Idaho

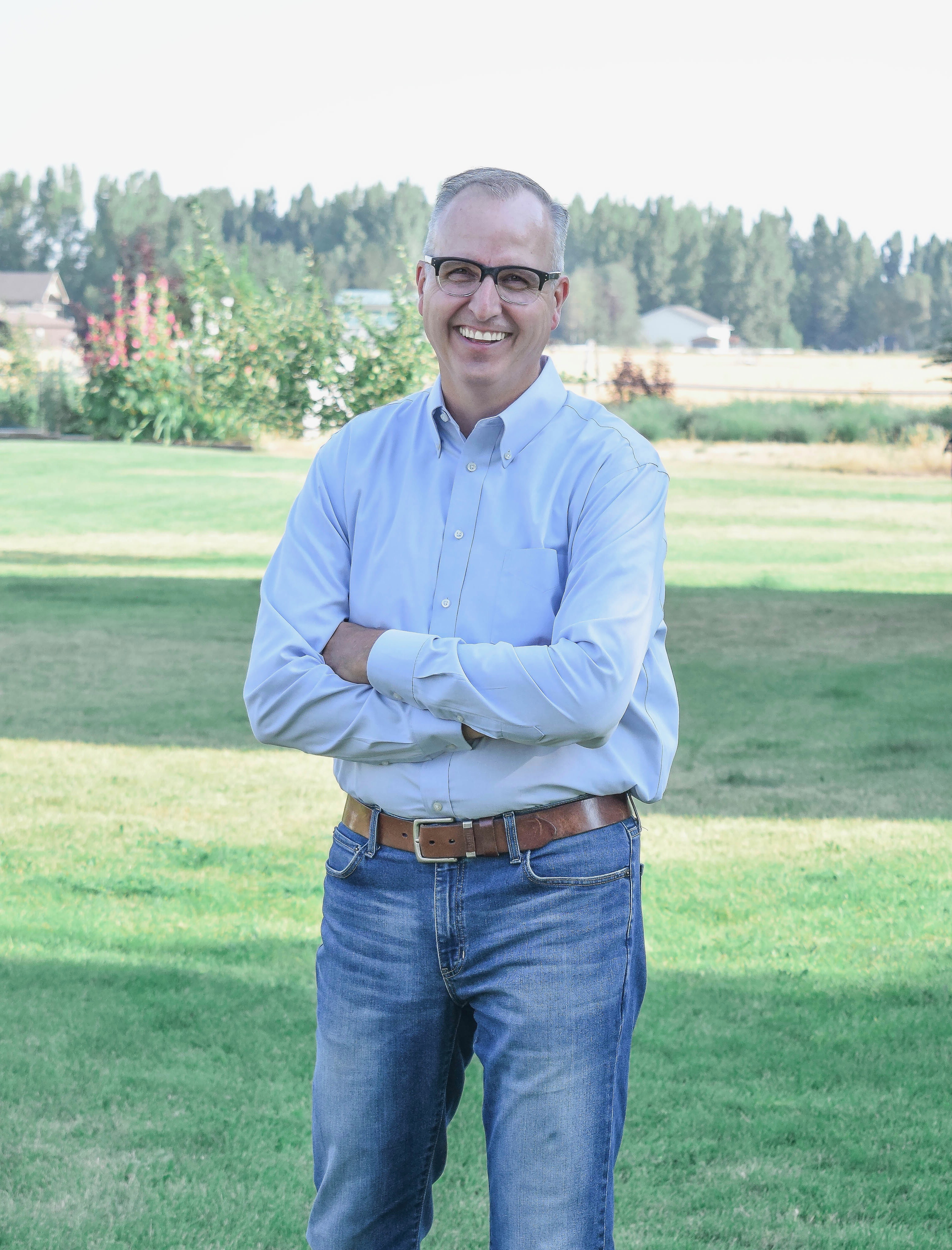

Member of the Idaho House of Representatives
- In office December 1, 2020 – November 30, 2022
- Preceded by: Britt Raybould
- Succeeded by: Britt Raybould
- Constituency: 34th district Seat B
- In office December 1, 2014 – November 30, 2018
- Preceded by: Douglas Hancey
- Succeeded by: Doug Ricks
- Constituency: 34th district Seat A

Personal details
- Born: Salt Lake City, Utah, U.S.
- Party: Republican
- Spouse: Maria Olsen
- Children: 4
- Education: University of Utah (BS); University of Connecticut (MA), (PhD)
- Profession: Professor
- Website: www.nateforidaho.com

Ronald M. Nate is an American politician and economist who has previously served as a member of the Idaho House of Representatives from the 34th district. He was an economics professor at Brigham Young University–Idaho and is now president of the Idaho Freedom Foundation, a conservative think tank. He is part of the far-right faction of the Idaho Republican Party.

== Early life and education ==
Nate was born in Salt Lake City, Utah. He earned Bachelor of Science in economics from the University of Utah, and a Master of Arts and a doctoral degree in economics from the University of Connecticut.

== Academic career ==
He was a professor of economics at Brigham Young University–Idaho from 2001 to 2022 and was a member of the Foundation for Economic Education faculty network.

== Political career ==
Nate was an alternate delegate for George W. Bush at the 2004 Republican National Convention. Nate was chairman of the Madison County Republican central committee from 2006 to 2010 and chaired the Idaho Republican caucuses in 2012. From 2007 to 2013, he was a member of the Idaho Judicial Council. He was a John McCain delegate at the 2008 Republican National Convention.

He advised the Brigham Young University–Idaho College Republicans before the group was officially dissolved by the university in 2009. In 2018, Nate was named Idaho Republican Party state legislator of the year.

In 2014, Nate ran against the incumbent Douglas A. Hancey in the Republican primary election, winning with 55.3% of the vote. He ran unopposed in the November 2014 general election.

In 2016, Nate won the Republican primary against Doug Ricks with 51.6% of the vote. His 167-vote margin of victory was among the narrowest in the state. He ran unopposed in the general election. He supported Ted Cruz in the 2016 Republican Party presidential primaries, and was a Cruz delegate at the 2016 Republican National Convention. He called on Donald Trump "to step aside from the nomination and allow the party to replace the top spot on the ticket" after the release of the Donald Trump Access Hollywood tape.

In the 2018 Republican primary, Nate ran against Ricks in a rematch. In the May 2018 primary, Nate received 49% of the vote, losing to Ricks, who came out 159 votes ahead. He endorsed Russ Fulcher in the Idaho 1st Congressional district race. He also endorsed Raúl Labrador for governor.

In 2020, Nate ran for District 34 Seat B against Republican incumbent Britt Raybould. He defeated Raybould in the June 2020 Republican primary with 52% of the vote, and ran unopposed in the November 2020 general election. In 2022, Nate ran for re-election, but was defeated by Raybould in the Republican primary by 36 votes.

Nate is a co-founder of the Madison Liberty Institute in Rexburg.
