= Bert Marley =

American politician from Idaho

Chair of the Idaho Democratic Party
- In office August 1, 2015 – March 16, 2019
- Preceded by: Jeanne Buell (Acting)
- Succeeded by: Van Beechler

Member of the Idaho Senate
- In office October 12, 2001 – December 1, 2006
- Preceded by: Lin Whitworth
- Succeeded by: Diane Bilyeu
- Constituency: 33rd district (2001–2002); 29th district (2002–2006)

Member of the Idaho House of Representatives from the 33rd district
- In office December 1, 1998 – October 12, 2001
- Preceded by: John Alexander
- Succeeded by: Elmer Martinez

Personal details
- Born: May 1, 1948 (age 78) Provo, Utah, U.S.
- Party: Democratic
- Spouse: Michelle
- Children: 2
- Education: Idaho State University (BA); Utah State University (MEd)
- Occupation: Politician

Bert C. Marley (born May 1, 1948) is an American politician and educator. He served as chair of the Idaho Democratic Party from August 2015 to March 16, 2019. He previously served as a member of the Idaho Senate and Idaho House of Representatives.

== Early life and education ==
Marley was born in Provo, Utah. He received a Bachelor of Arts in German language from Idaho State University in 1973, and his Masters of Education from Utah State University in 1996.

== Career ==
Marley worked as a teacher at Marsh Valley High School for 23 years.

=== Idaho Legislature ===
Marley served in the Idaho House of Representatives from 1998 through 2001 and in the Idaho State Senate from 2001 through 2006.

In 2006, he ran against Jana Jones in the Democratic Party primary election for Superintendent of Public Instruction, and lost earning 44.6% of the vote.

In 2014, Marley was unopposed for the Democratic primary for Lieutenant Governor of Idaho. He was defeated by the Republican incumbent, Brad Little, earning only 32.9% of the vote.

=== Idaho Democratic Party ===
He was the chair of the Idaho Democratic Party from August 2015 to March 16, 2019.

The largest Democratic caucus in the nation happened during his tenure in Ada County.

During Marley's tenure, Sally Boynton Brown served as the party's executive director.

== Personal life ==
Marley lives in McCammon, Idaho. He and his wife, Michelle, have two children.

Idaho House of Representatives
| Preceded by John Alexander | Member of the Idaho House of Representatives from the 33rd district December 1, 1998–October 12, 2001 | Succeeded by Elmer Martinez |
Idaho Senate
| Preceded by Lin Whitworth | Member of the Idaho Senate from the 33rd district October 12, 2001–December 1, 2002 | Succeeded by Bart Davis |
| Preceded by Bart Davis | Member of the Idaho Senate from the 29th district December 1, 2002–December 1, 2006 | Succeeded by Diane Bilyeu |
Party political offices
| Preceded by Jeanne Buell; Acting | Chair of the Idaho Democratic Party; August 1, 2015–March 16, 2019 | Succeeded by Van Beechler |
