= Jerry Shively =

American politician

Member of the Idaho House of Representatives from the 33rd district
- In office 2008–2010
- Succeeded by: Jeff Thompson

Personal details
- Party: Democratic
- Education: University of Idaho (BA, MEd)

Jerry Shively is an American educator and politician who served as a member of the Idaho House of Representatives for the 33rd district from 2008 to 2010. After serving for one term, Shively was defeated by Republican Jeff Thompson.

== Education ==
Shively earned a Bachelor of Arts degree and Master of Education in music education from the University of Idaho.

== Career ==
Prior to entering politics, Shively worked as a music teacher in Idaho Falls, Idaho at Idaho Falls High School and Skyline High School. He later became music coordinator of the city school district before retiring. Shively also served as a member of the staff of St. Paul's United Methodist Church in Idaho Falls.
