= Joshua Hurwit =

American lawyer (born 1981)

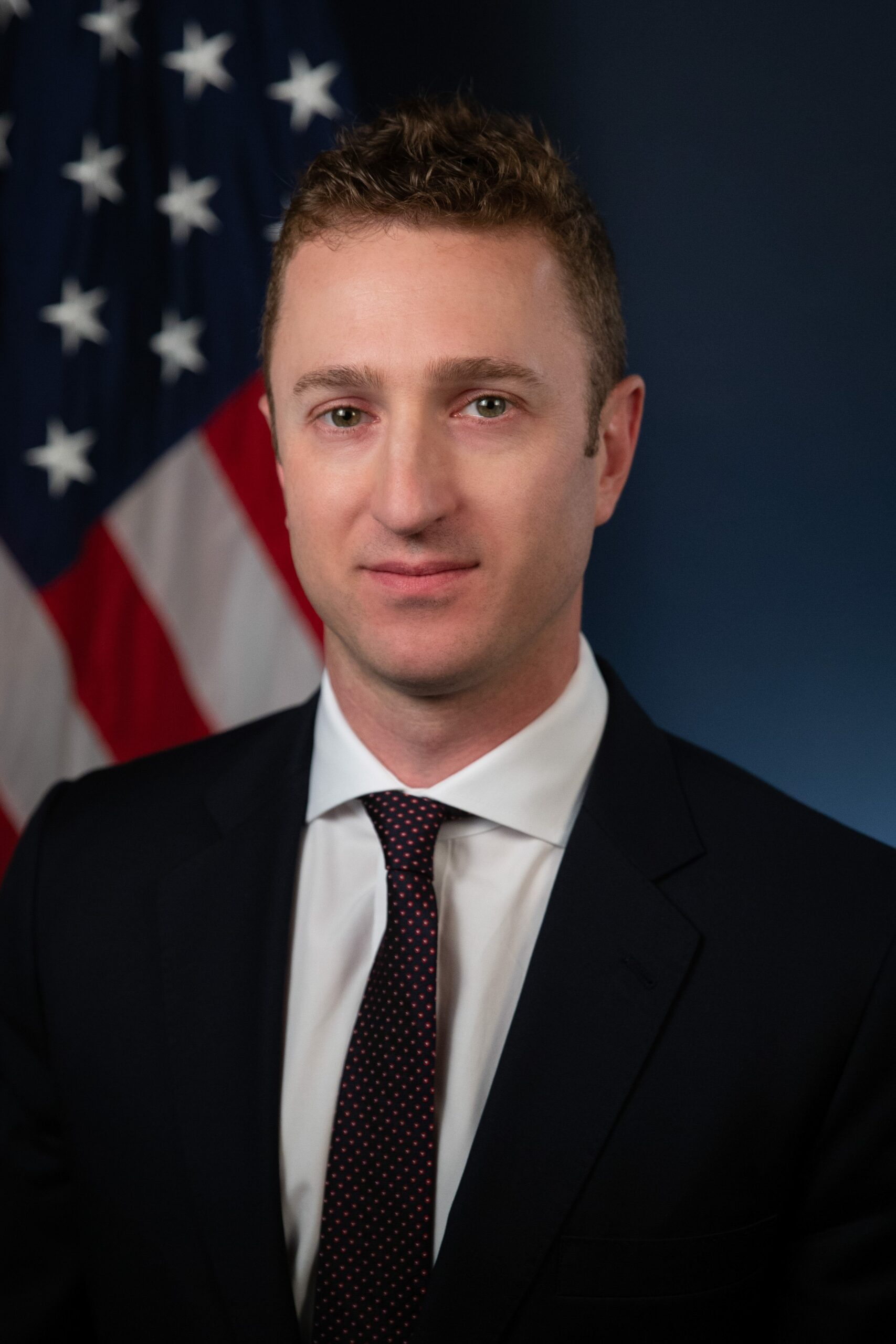

United States Attorney for the District of Idaho
- In office June 17, 2022 – February 13, 2025
- President: Joe Biden; Donald Trump
- Preceded by: Bart Davis
- Succeeded by: Bart Davis

Personal details
- Born: Joshua David Hurwit; 1981 (age 44–45)
- Education: Stanford University (BA); Harvard University (JD)

Joshua David Hurwit (born 1981) is an American lawyer who served as United States attorney for the District of Idaho from 2022 to 2025.

== Education ==
Hurwit earned a Bachelor of Arts degree from Stanford University in 2002 and a Juris Doctor from Harvard Law School in 2006.

== Career ==
In 2006 and 2007, Hurwit worked as an associate at Paul, Weiss, Rifkind, Wharton & Garrison in New York City. In 2007 and 2008, he served as a law clerk for Judge Naomi Reice Buchwald of the United States District Court for the Southern District of New York. From 2008 to 2011, he was an associate at Kirkland & Ellis. He also worked as an associate at Covington & Burling in Washington, D.C. From 2012 to 2022, he served as an assistant United States attorney for the District of Idaho. During his tenure, Hurwit has prosecuted members of the Aryan Knights, a white supremacist gang active in Idaho. He has also served as the District of Idaho's coronavirus fraud coordinator.

=== U.S. attorney for the District of Idaho ===
On April 22, 2022, President Joe Biden announced his intent to nominate Hurwit to serve as the United States attorney for the District of Idaho. On April 25, 2022, his nomination was sent to the Senate. On June 9, 2022, his nomination was reported out of the Senate Judiciary Committee by a voice vote; senators Josh Hawley and Marsha Blackburn were recorded as "Nay". On June 13, 2022, his nomination was confirmed in the United States Senate by voice vote. He was sworn in by Chief Judge David Nye on June 17, 2022.

Hurwit resigned on February 13, 2025.
