= Mack Shirley =

American politician from Idaho

Member of the Idaho House of Representatives from District 34 Seat A
- In office December 1, 2002 – December 1, 2012
- Preceded by: Donna Boe
- Succeeded by: Douglas Hancey

Personal details
- Born: July 24, 1933 (age 93) Rexburg, Idaho
- Party: Republican
- Education: Ricks College; University of Utah
- Profession: Educator

Military service
- Branch/service: United States Army Reserve

Mack G. Shirley (born July 24, 1933 in Rexburg, Idaho) was a Republican Idaho State Representative from 2002-2012 representing District 34 in the A seat.

== Education and career ==
Shirley graduated from Sugar-Salem High School in 1951 and earned his bachelor's degree in sociology from Ricks College in 1955. Shirley earned his master's degree in education administration from the University of Utah in 1957. He served in the United States Army Reserve.

From 1957-1963, Shirley was a teacher and then a principal in the Sugar-Salem School District. He returned to the University of Utah and completed his Ph.D. in higher education administration there in 1972. He then was a faculty member, dean of students, and vice president of Ricks College until his retirement in 2000.

== Elections ==
District 34 House Seat A - Madison County and part of Fremont County
Year	Candidate	Votes	Pct	Candidate	Votes	Pct	Candidate	Votes	Pct	Candidate	Votes	Pct	Candidate	Votes	Pct
2002 Primary	Mack; Shirley	2,210	38.8%	Diana; Richman	1,133	19.9%	Lynn; Loosli	964	16.9%	Rex Rammell	835	14.6%	Max; Mortensen (inc.)	559	9.8%
2002 General	Mack; Shirley	9,697	100%												
2004 Primary	Mack; Shirley (inc.)	5,064	64.3%	Rex; Rammell	2,814	35.7%									
2004 General	Mack; Shirley (inc.)	14,567	91.1%	Timothy; Raty	1,419	8.9%									
2006 Primary	Mack; Shirley (inc,)	5,085	100%												
2006 General	Mack; Shirley (inc.)	10,815	100%												
2008 Primary	Mack; Shirley (inc.)	6,196	100%												
2008 General	Mack; Shirley (inc.)	14,732	84.1%	Dan; Roberts	2,777	15.9%									
2010 Primary	Mack; Shirley (inc.)	4,572	63.7%	Dan; Roberts	2,610	36.3%									
2010 General	Mack; Shirley (inc.)	10,082	100%												
