= Barbara Ehardt =

American politician

Member of the Idaho House of Representatives from the 33rd district
- Incumbent
- Assumed office December 27, 2017
- Preceded by: Janet Trujillo

Personal details
- Born: Barbara Dee Ehardt; February 29, 1964 (age 62) Idaho Falls, Idaho, U.S.
- Party: Republican
- Coaching career

Biographical details
- Education: North Idaho College (AS); Idaho State University (BS)

Playing career
- 1983–1985: North Idaho
- 1985–1987: Idaho State
- Position: Point guard

Coaching career (HC unless noted)
- 1987–1988: Pocatello HS (asst.)
- 1988–1995: BYU (asst.)
- 1995–1997: UC Santa Barbara (asst.)
- 1997–1999: Washington State (asst.)
- 2000–2003: Cal State Fullerton

Head coaching record
- Overall: 12–72 (.143)

Barbara Dee Ehardt (born February 29, 1964) is an American politician and former college basketball coach. A member of the Republican Party, she has served in the Idaho House of Representatives for the 33rd district since 2017. Previously, Ehardt was a high school and college basketball coach from 1987 to 2003, including three seasons as women's basketball head coach at Cal State Fullerton from 2000 to 2003.

== Early life and education ==
Ehardt was born in Idaho Falls, Idaho in 1964. After graduating from Idaho Falls High School in 1983, she earned an associate degree in general studies from North Idaho College in 1985 and a Bachelor of Science degree in English and language arts education from Idaho State University in 1988. A 5-foot-9 point guard, Ehardt also played basketball at North Idaho from 1983 to 1985 and Idaho State from 1985 to 1987. In her senior season of 1986–87 under head coach Mark French, Ehardt played in 20 games, averaging 1.0 points, 0.6 rebounds, and 0.5 assists.

== Coaching career ==
In the 1987–88 season, Ehardt was an assistant coach at Pocatello High School. After completing her undergraduate degree at Idaho State, Ehardt joined UC Santa Barbara as an assistant coach in 1988, again under head coach Mark French. Ehardt helped turn around a struggling UC Santa Barbara program, tripling its win total from nine in 1988–89 to a 27–5 record in 1991–92. UC Santa Barbara also had back-to-back Big West Conference championships and NCAA Tournament appearances in 1991–92 and 1992–93.

After seven seasons at UC Santa Barbara, Ehardt was an assistant coach at BYU from 1995 to 1997 under head coach Soni Adams and Washington State from 1997 to 1999 under head coach Harold Rhodes.

On May 10, 2000, Cal State Fullerton hired Ehardt as women's basketball head coach. Ehardt inherited a team that last had a winning season nine years ago and won only 16 out of 80 games in the last three seasons. Winning only one game in her first season, Ehardt had a 12–72 record as head coach in three seasons. As announced by Cal State Fullerton on March 12, 2003, following a 7–21 season, Ehardt's contract expired without a renewal on March 31, 2003.

In 2003, Ehardt returned to Idaho Falls, where she has since operated a sports camp for children and managed basketball programs.

== Political career ==
Ehardt had been active in Republican Party politics since college; as a student at North Idaho College, she led the Young Republicans chapter. She was also president of the Bonneville County Republican Women.

In 2013, Ehardt was elected to the Idaho Falls City Council.

Ehardt was appointed to the Idaho House of Representatives on December 27, 2017. In November 2019, Ehardt was labelled "a Republican lightning rod" by East Idaho News. During her first term in the House, she authored a bill that would restrict statewide sex education.

In the legislature, Ehardt sponsored a bill that would required transgender athletes to play on teams corresponding to the gender they were assigned at birth. The bill has attracted significant criticism, both within Idaho and nationally. Ehardt was interviewed as a part of the HBO series Real Sports with Bryant Gumbel, in which she defended the bill.

== Head coaching record ==
Record table
Season	Team	Overall	Conference	Standing
Cal State Fullerton Titans (Big West Conference) (2000–2003)
2000–01	Cal State Fullerton	1–27	1–13	8th
2001–02	Cal State Fullerton	4–24	2–14	T–8th
2002–03	Cal State Fullerton	7–21	5–11	T–7th
Cal State Fullerton:		12–72 (.143)	8–38 (.174)	
Total:		12–72 (.143)		
