= Tony Potts (politician) =

American politician from Idaho

Member of the Idaho Senate from the 33rd district
- In office October 10, 2017 – November 30, 2018
- Preceded by: Bart Davis
- Succeeded by: Dave Lent

Personal details
- Born: 1976 or 1977 (age 48–49)
- Party: Republican
- Education: Brigham Young University

Tony Potts (born 1976/77) was an appointed Republican Idaho state senator. He served only one session of the Idaho legislature, filling the unexpired of term of Bart Davis, before losing in the Republican primary to Dave Lent.

== Biography ==
Potts graduated from Brigham Young University. He is active in the local Republican party and unsuccessfully ran for Bonneville County Commission in 2016. He works as a property manager and salesman in Idaho Falls.

Following the resignation of longtime Senator Bart Davis in order to serve as United States Attorney for the District of Idaho, Potts was selected by Governor Butch Otter to fill the vacancy. He was chosen over State Representative Bryan Zollinger and Mark Fuller, chairman of the Bonneville County Republican Party.

Potts lost by a close to a two-to-one margin in the May 15, 2018 Republican Primary to David Lent.
