= Lin Whitworth =

American politician from Idaho (1933–2021)

Arthur Lin Whitworth

Member of the Idaho Senate from the 33rd district
- In office December 1, 1994 – October 1, 2001
- Preceded by: Mary Lloyd
- Succeeded by: Bert Marley

Personal details
- Born: December 28, 1933 Inkom, Idaho
- Died: April 10, 2021 (aged 87) Pocatello, Idaho
- Party: Democratic
- Spouse: Carol
- Children: 7 children, 40 grandchildren
- Profession: Farmer, county commissioner, conductor, state senator

Arthur Lin Whitworth (December 28, 1933 – April 10, 2021) was a Democratic county commissioner from Bannock County, Idaho. He previously served in the Idaho State Senate and was a candidate for the United States House of Representatives in 2004.

== Background ==
Arthur Lin Whitworth was born in Inkom, Idaho, a small town near Pocatello, Idaho. He went to the Inkom Elementary and Inkom High Schools. Whitworth worked for the Union Pacific Railroad. He was a lifelong resident of Inkom, Idaho.

== Elections ==
=== Idaho Senate District 33 ===
Whitworth was elected to the Idaho Senate in 1994, defeating Republican Karen McGee. He was reelected in 1996, 1998 and 2000 but resigned midway through his fourth term. Whitworth served in very small Democratic minorities in the Idaho Senate, and was one of only three Democrats in the body as of his 2001 resignation.

=== Idaho 2nd Congressional District ===
2004

Whitworth was unopposed in the Democratic primary.

Whitworth was defeated by incumbent Mike Simpson only getting 29.3% of the vote.

=== Bannock County Commissioner ===
2006

Whitworth was elected to the Bannock County Commission as a Democrat.

2008

Whitworth was defeated for reelection in the Democratic primary by Karen Cordell.

=== Idaho Senate District 28 ===
2014

Whitworth was unopposed in the Democratic Primary for Idaho Senate District 28.

Whitworth withdrew on June 30, 2014, leaving incumbent Jim Guthrie (politician) unopposed.

Party political offices
Preceded by Edward Kinghorn	Democratic Party nominee, Idaho's 2nd congressional district 2004 (lost)	Succeeded by Jim D. Hansen
