= Dell Raybould =

American politician (1933–2023)

Member of the Idaho House of Representatives
- In office December 1, 2000 – November 30, 2018
- Preceded by: Golden Linford
- Succeeded by: Britt Raybould
- Constituency: 27th district Seat B (2000–2002); 34th district Seat B (2002–2018)

Personal details
- Born: October 8, 1933 Rexburg, Idaho, U.S.
- Died: March 2, 2023 (aged 89)
- Party: Republican
- Education: Ricks College
- Website: dellraybould.com

Delmar Hunt Raybould (October 8, 1933 – March 2, 2023) was an American politician and a Republican member of the Idaho House of Representatives from 2002 to 2018 in the District 34 B seat; Raybould served consecutively from 2000 until 2002 in the District 27 B seat.

== Education ==
Raybould attended Ricks College.

== Elections ==
=== District 34 B ===
Dell Raybould announced his retirement in January 2018 and endorsed his granddaughter, Britt Raybould, for his seat.

2016

Raybould won the republican primary with 66.5% of the vote against Chick Heileson. Raybould was unopposed in the general election.

2014

Raybould was unopposed for the republican primary and the general election.

2012

Raybould won the three-way May 15, 2012 Republican Primary with 2,685 votes (58.6%) against John K. Baird and Dan Roberts.

Raybould was unopposed for the general election.

2010

Raybould was unopposed for the republican primary and the general election.

2008

Raybould was unopposed for the republican primary and the general election.

2006

Raybould was unopposed for the republican primary and the general election.

2004

Raybould was unopposed for the republican primary.

Raybould won the general election with 13,501 votes (86.4%) against Constitution candidate Anthony Stevens.

2002

Redistricted to 34B, and with Republican Representative Kent Kunz running for Idaho Senate, Raybould was unopposed for the republican primary and general election.

=== District 27 B ===
2000

When Republican Representative Golden Linford retired and left the District 27 B seat open, Raybould won the republican primary with 3,163 votes (67.0%) against Gerald "Jerry" Jeppesen.

Raybould won the three-way November 7, 2000 general election with 8,000 votes (76.8%) against Democratic nominee Ed Kinghorn (who had been appointed following the death of primary winner Art Hubscher who still took 0.2% of the vote, or 23 votes).

== Death ==
Raybould died at his home on March 2, 2023, at the age of 89.
