= Kenneth Bingham (politician) =

American politician

Member of the South Carolina House of Representatives from the 89th district
- In office 2001–2017
- Succeeded by: Micah Caskey

Personal details
- Born: August 3, 1962 (age 63) Columbia, South Carolina, United States
- Party: Republican

Kenneth A. Bingham (born August 3, 1962) is an American politician. He is a former member of the South Carolina House of Representatives from the 89th District, serving from 2001 until 2017. He is a member of the Republican party.
