= Brent Hill (politician) =

American politician

40th President pro tempore of the Idaho Senate
- In office December 2, 2010 – November 30, 2020
- Preceded by: Robert L. Geddes
- Succeeded by: Chuck Winder

Member of the Idaho Senate
- In office December 24, 2000 – November 30, 2020
- Preceded by: Robert Lee
- Succeeded by: Doug Ricks
- Constituency: 27th district (2000–2002); 34th district (2002–2020)

Personal details
- Born: April 23, 1949 (age 77) Rigby, Idaho, U.S.
- Party: Republican
- Spouse: Julie Slaugh
- Children: 4
- Education: Utah State University (BS)

Brent Hill (born April 23, 1949) is an American politician and Certified Public Accountant who served as a member of the Idaho Senate from 2000 to 2020.

== Early life and career ==
Born and raised in Idaho, he attended Sugar-Salem Schools and graduated as valedictorian from Madison High School. After attending Brigham Young University–Idaho, he graduated as the Outstanding Accounting Graduate from Utah State University in Logan, Utah.

== Career ==
He served over twenty years as the CEO of Rudd & Company CPA. Hill is a certified public accountant and certified financial planner.

Hill is a member of the Board of Directors of Citizens Community Bank with offices throughout Eastern Idaho. In 2001, Hill was elected to represent Idaho's 34th Legislative District which encompasses Madison and Fremont Counties.

On January 30, 2020, Hill announced his retirement from the State Senate to join the National Institute for Civil Discourse, where he will serve as the Next Generation Program Director.

Hill was elected by his fellow senators to be the President pro tempore in the 61st Idaho Legislature (2010–2012) and served in the position until he left office in 2020.

== Personal life ==
Hill is a native of Rexburg, Idaho. He and his wife, Julie Ann Slaugh, have four children and 20 grandchildren.

== Committees ==
2009–10 session

- Agricultural Affairs
- Judiciary and Rules
- Local Government and Taxation

2011–12 session

- Judiciary and Rules
- Local Government and Taxation
- State Affairs

2013–14 session

- Local Government and Taxation
- State Affairs

2015–16 session

- State Affairs
- Economic Outlook and Revenue Assessment

2017–18 session

- State Affairs
- Local Government and Taxation

2019–20 session

- State Affairs
- Local Government and Taxation

== Historical racing ==
Hill is a named member of the Idaho United Against Prop 1 Political Action Committee (PAC), which was created to oppose Idaho Proposition 1 (2018). The PAC's treasurer is "Ernie" Stensgar, a member of the Coeur d'Alene tribe. In 2015, tribal representatives testified during Idaho Senate and House State Affairs committee hearings that they were worried that historical racing terminals at racetracks would negatively impact their own tribal casino revenues.

Tennessee Senate
Preceded by Robert L. Geddes	President pro tempore of the Idaho Senate; 2011–2020	Succeeded by Chuck Winder
