= Linden Bateman =

American politician from Idaho (1940–2026)

Member of the Idaho House of Representatives
- In office December 1, 2010 – November 30, 2016
- Preceded by: Russ Mathews
- Succeeded by: Bryan Zollinger
- Constituency: 33rd district Seat B
- In office December 1, 1976 – December 8, 1986
- Succeeded by: Con Mahoney
- Constituency: 31st district (1977–1982); 32nd district Seat C (1982–1986)

Personal details
- Born: July 11, 1940 Salt Lake City, Utah, U.S.
- Died: January 22, 2026 (aged 85) Idaho Falls, Idaho, U.S.
- Party: Republican
- Spouse: Deann Willes (m. 1965)
- Education: Brigham Young University

Linden Bart Bateman (July 11, 1940 – January 22, 2026) was an American politician who was a Republican Idaho State Representative from 2010 until 2016, representing District 33 in the B seat. He served five terms in the Idaho House of Representatives from 1977 until 1986.

== Early life and education ==
Bateman was born in Salt Lake City, Utah, on July 11, 1940. He earned his bachelor's degree in political science from Brigham Young University in 1982.

== Career ==
Bateman spent his career as a high school teacher. He was a history and government teacher. He later worked as supervisor of student teachers for Brigham Young University-Idaho. He was a founding member of the Bonneville County Historical Society and was involved in forming that county's history museum. He wrote the script for the short film Idaho Women in White and was also involved in compiling the photos used for it.

=== Political office ===
Bateman previously served five terms in the Idaho House of Representatives from 1977 until 1986.

He was a force behind Idaho's rescinding of its ratification of the Equal Rights Amendment to the US Constitution. Bateman was a major force behind the designation of March 4 as Idaho Day. He also pushed to have cursive included in the elementary curriculum of Idaho. Bateman continued as a speaker on history since he left the Idaho House.

== Personal life and death ==
Bateman was a member of the Church of Jesus Christ of Latter-day Saints. He died in Idaho Falls, Idaho, on January 22, 2026, at the age of 85.

== Elections ==
=== 2014 ===
Bateman was unopposed in the Republican primary. Bateman defeated Jim De Angelis in the general election .

=== 2012 ===
Bateman won the May 15, 2012, Republican primary with 2,680 votes (75.6%) against David Lyon, facing Democratic challenger Henry De Angelis in the general election on November 6, 2012.

Bateman supported Mitt Romney for the Republican Party's nominee in the 2012 presidential election.

=== 2010 ===
When Republican Representative Russ Mathews left the District 33 B seat open, Bateman won the May 25, 2010, Republican primary with 2,465 votes (66.8%) against Dane Watkins, winning the November 2, 2012, general election with 6,036 votes (59.1%) against John McGimpsey (D).
