= Bart Davis =

American politician (born 1955)

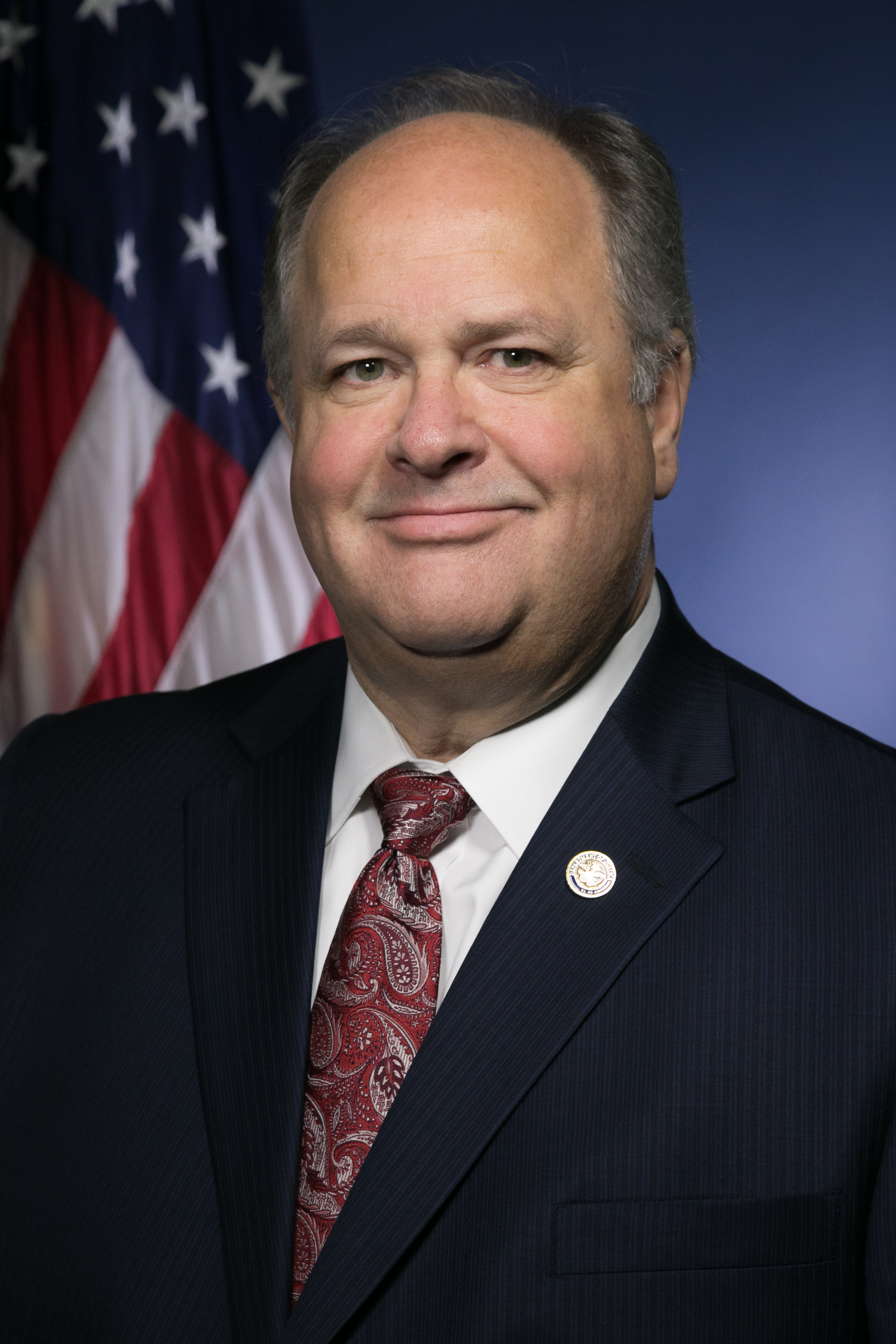
- Official portrait, 2017

United States Attorney for the District of Idaho
- In office October 10, 2025 – October 17, 2026
- President: Donald Trump
- Preceded by: Joshua Hurwit
- Succeeded by: John Shirts (interim)
- In office September 21, 2017 – February 28, 2021
- President: Donald Trump; Joe Biden
- Preceded by: Wendy J. Olson
- Succeeded by: Joshua Hurwit

Majority Leader of the Idaho Senate
- In office December 1, 2002 – September 20, 2017
- Preceded by: Jim Risch
- Succeeded by: Chuck Winder

Member of the Idaho Senate
- In office December 1, 1998 – September 21, 2017
- Preceded by: John Hansen
- Succeeded by: Tony Potts
- Constituency: 29th district (1998–2002); 33rd district (2002–2017)

Personal details
- Born: Bart McKay Davis; March 7, 1955 (age 71) Rapid City, South Dakota, U.S.
- Party: Republican
- Spouse: Marion Woffinden Davis
- Children: 6
- Education: Brigham Young University (BA); University of Idaho (JD)
- Profession: Lawyer

Bart McKay Davis (born March 7, 1955) is an American attorney and politician who served as the United States attorney for the District of Idaho from 2025 to 2026. He previously served as the U.S. attorney from 2017 to 2021. He previously served as a Republican member of the Idaho Senate, representing District 33 from 2002 to 2017. He represented District 29 from 1998 to 2002. During his time in the Idaho Senate, he served as state senate majority leader.

== Early life and education ==
Born in Rapid City, South Dakota, Davis was raised in Idaho Falls, Idaho. Davis received a Bachelor of Arts in English from Brigham Young University in 1978 and a Juris Doctor in 1980 from the University of Idaho College of Law.

== Career ==
Following his graduation from law school, Davis began his legal practice in Idaho Falls. He is admitted to practice before the Idaho Supreme Court, the United States District Court for the District of Idaho, the United States District Court for the District of Arizona, the United States Court of Appeals for the Ninth Circuit, and the United States Supreme Court. In 1990, he was co-counsel with former solicitor general Rex Lee in Davis v. United States before the United States Supreme Court. Davis' parents were the petitioners in the case. Since 2001, Davis has represented Idaho as a commissioner on the Uniform Law Commission. He is a past chairman of the Council of State Governments.

=== Idaho Senate ===
In 1998, six-term incumbent Senator John Hansen did not seek reelection to the Idaho Senate. Davis ran for the open seat and was elected. He served as Majority Caucus Chair from 2000 to 2002, and from 2002 to 2017 has served as Senate Majority Leader.

=== U.S. attorney ===
==== First term ====
In June 2017, President Donald Trump appointed him to become the next United States Attorney in the United States District Court for the District of Idaho. The Senate Judiciary Committee on September 7, 2017, approved his recommendation by a unanimous voice vote. He was confirmed by United States Senate by voice vote on September 14, 2017.

On February 8, 2021, he and 55 other Trump-era attorneys were asked to resign. On February 11, 2021, Davis submitted his resignation, effective February 28.

==== Second term ====
On April 1, 2025, his nomination was sent to the United States Senate. He was confirmed by the U.S. Senate on October 7, 2025. He retired from the position on October 17, 2026.

=== Redistricting ===
Senator Pro-Tem Chuck Winder appointed Davis to Idaho's Independent Redistricting Commission. Davis served as co-chair of the commission.

== Personal life ==
He married Marion Woffinden Davis in 1976 and together they have six children.

== Writing ==
- Bart Davis, Kate Kelly, and Kristin Ford, Use of Legislative History: Willow Witching for Legislative Intent, 43 Idaho College of Law Review 585 (2007).
- Bart Davis, Idaho's Messy History with Term Limits: A Modest Response, 52 Idaho College of Law Review 463 (2016).

== Electoral history ==
District 29 Senate - part of Bonneville County
Year	Candidate	Votes	Pct	Candidate	Votes	Pct	Candidate	Votes	Pct
1998 primary	Bart Davis	2,120	57.4%	Brenda Bergener Heaton	1,573	42.6%			
1998 general	Bart Davis	5,148	56.0%	Edith Stanger	4,044	44.0%			
2000 primary	Bart Davis (incumbent)	3,122	100%						
2000 general	Bart Davis (incumbent)	8,343	73.8%	Kenneth Walton	2,959	26.2%	Rue Stears	1	0.0%

District 33 Senate - part of Bonneville County
Year	Candidate	Votes	Pct	Candidate	Votes	Pct
2002 primary	Bart Davis (incumbent)	3,140	100%			
2002 general	Bart Davis (incumbent)	7,004	59.2%	Ellie Hampton	4,831	40.8%
2004 primary	Bart Davis (incumbent)	1,794	69.8%	Kenneth Walton	778	30.2%
2004 general	Bart Davis (incumbent)	12,380	100%			
2006 primary	Bart Davis (incumbent)	1,950	70.6%	Kenneth Walton	811	29.4%
2006 general	Bart Davis (incumbent)	6,985	60.0%	Neil Williams	4,655	40.0%
2008 primary	Bart Davis (incumbent)	1,495	74.7%	Kenneth Walton	507	25.3%
2008 general	Bart Davis (incumbent)	9,456	64.8%	Neil Williams	5,136	35.2%
2010 primary	Bart Davis (incumbent)	3,173	100%			
2010 general	Bart Davis (incumbent)	6,764	66.5%	Neil Williams	3,411	33.5%
2012 primary	Bart Davis (incumbent)	2,719	74.7%	Brian Schad	921	25.3%
2012 general	Bart Davis (incumbent)	13,809	100%			
2014 primary	Bart Davis (incumbent)	3,635	100%			
2014 general	Bart Davis (incumbent)	8,365	100%			
2016 primary	Bart Davis (incumbent)	2,392	100.0%			
2016 general	Bart Davis (incumbent)	11,848	70.6%	Jim Francis (W/I)	1,575	11.7%

Idaho Senate
Preceded by John Hansen	Member of the Idaho Senate from the 29th district December 1, 1998–December 1, 2002	Succeeded by Bert Marley
Preceded by Bert Marley	Member of the Idaho Senate from the 33rd district December 1, 2002–September 21, 2017	Succeeded by Tony Potts
Legal offices
Preceded by Wendy J. Olson	United States Attorney for the District of Idaho; 2017–2021	Succeeded by Rafael M. Gonzalez Jr. Acting
Preceded by Joshua Hurwit	United States Attorney for the District of Idaho; 2025–2026	Succeeded by John Shirts; Interim
