= 1930 United States Senate elections =

- November 4, 1930
- Class 2

32 of the 96 seats in the United States Senate 49 seats needed for a majority
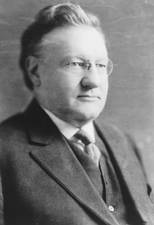

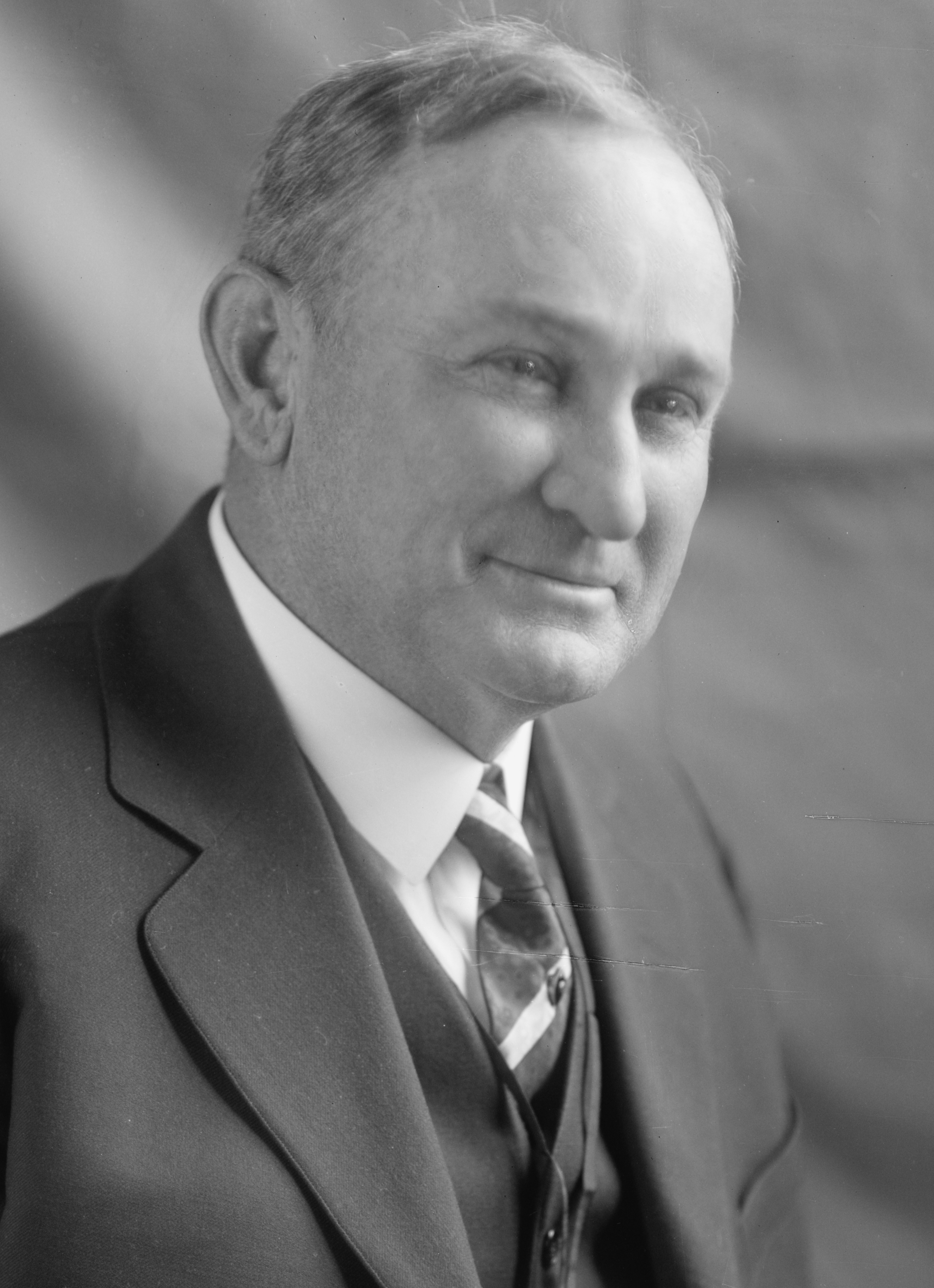
	Majority party	Minority party
Leader	James Watson	Joseph Robinson
Party	Republican	Democratic
Leader since	March 4, 1929	December 3, 1923
Leader's seat	Indiana	Arkansas
Seats before	56	39
Seats after	48	47
Seat change	▼8	▲8
Seats up	22	13
Races won	14	21
	Third party
Party	Farmer–Labor
Seats before	1
Seats after	1
Seat change	Steady
Seats up	0
Races won	0
- Results of the elections: Democratic gain Democratic hold Republican gain Republican hold No election
Majority Leader before election
James Watson
Republican
Elected Majority Leader
James Watson
Republican

The 1930 United States Senate elections occurred in the middle of Republican President Herbert Hoover's term. The 32 seats of Class 2 were contested in regular elections, and special elections were held to fill vacancies. With the Great Depression beginning to take hold, Republican incumbents became unpopular, and Democrats picked up a net of eight seats, erasing the Republican gains from the previous election cycle, however, Republicans retained control of the chamber. This was the first of four consecutive Senate elections during the Depression in which Democrats made enormous gains, achieving a cumulative pick-up of 34 seats.

In Louisiana, Democratic senator-elect Huey Long chose not to take his Senate seat until January 25, 1932, so he could remain as Governor of Louisiana. The Republicans therefore retained the plurality of seats at the beginning of the next Congress (with Vice President Charles Curtis (R) able to cast tie-breaking votes, the Republicans would have majority control).

== Gains, losses, and holds ==
=== Retirements ===
Four Republicans retired instead of seeking re-election. Two Republicans retired instead of seeking election to finish the unexpired term and instead of seeking election to full term. One Democrat retired instead of seeking election to a full term.

State	Senator	Replaced by
Colorado	Lawrence C. Phipps	Edward P. Costigan
Maine	Arthur R. Gould	Wallace H. White
Massachusetts	Frederick H. Gillett	Marcus A. Coolidge
New Jersey	David Baird Jr.	Dwight Morrow
Tennessee (regular)	William E. Brock	Cordell Hull
West Virginia	Guy D. Goff	Matthew M. Neely
Wyoming	Patrick J. Sullivan	Robert D. Carey

=== Defeats ===
Seven Republicans and five Democrats sought re-election but lost in the primary or general election.

State	Senator	Replaced by
Alabama	J. Thomas Heflin	John H. Bankhead II
Illinois	Charles S. Deneen	J. Hamilton Lewis
Iowa	Daniel F. Steck	L. J. Dickinson
Kansas (special)	Henry J. Allen	George McGill
Kentucky (special)	John M. Robsion	Ben M. Williamson
Kentucky	John M. Robsion	M. M. Logan
Louisiana	Joseph E. Ransdell	Huey Long
North Carolina	F. M. Simmons	Josiah Bailey
Oklahoma	William B. Pine	Thomas Gore
Ohio	Roscoe C. McCulloch	Robert J. Bulkley
Pennsylvania	Joseph R. Grundy	James J. Davis
South Carolina	Cole L. Blease	James F. Byrnes
South Dakota	William H. McMaster	William J. Bulow

=== Post-election changes ===
State	Senator	Replaced by
New Jersey	Dwight Morrow	W. Warren Barbour
Arkansas	Thaddeus H. Caraway	Hattie Caraway
Georgia	William J. Harris	John S. Cohen
Georgia	John S. Cohen	Richard Russell Jr.
Vermont	Frank C. Partridge	Warren Austin
Missouri	Harry B. Hawes	Bennett Champ Clark

== Change in composition ==
=== Before the elections ===
		D_{1}	D_{2}	D_{3}	D_{4}	D_{5}	D_{6}	D_{7}	D_{8}
D_{18}	D_{17}	D_{16}	D_{15}	D_{14}	D_{13}	D_{12}	D_{11}	D_{10}	D_{9}
D_{19}	D_{20}	D_{21}	D_{22}	D_{23}	D_{24}	D_{25}	D_{26}	D_{27} Ala. Ran	D_{28} Ark. Ran
D_{37} Texas; Ran	D_{39} Tenn. (sp); Ran Tenn. (reg); Retired	D_{36} S.C. Ran	D_{35} N.C. Ran	D_{34} N.M. Ran	D_{33} Mont. Ran	D_{32} Miss. Ran	D_{31} La. Ran	D_{30} Iowa; Ran	D_{29} Ga. Ran
D_{38} Va. Ran	FL_{1}	R_{56} Wyo. (reg); Wyo. (sp); Retired	R_{55} W.Va. Retired	R_{54} S.D. Ran	R_{53} R.I. Ran	R_{52} Pa. (sp); Ran	R_{51} Ore. Ran	R_{50} Okla. Ran	R_{49} Ohio (sp); Ran
Majority →									R_{49} Ohio (sp); Ran
R_{39} Kan. Ran	R_{40} Kan. (sp); Ran	R_{41} Ky. Ky. (sp); Ran	R_{42} Maine; Retired	R_{43} Mass. Retired	R_{44} Mich. Ran	R_{45} Minn. Ran	R_{46} Neb. Ran	R_{47} N.H. Ran	R_{48} N.J. N.J. (sp); Retired
R_{38} Ill. Ran	R_{37} Idaho; Ran	R_{36} Del. (reg); Del. (sp); Ran	R_{35} Colo. Retired	R_{34}	R_{33}	R_{32}	R_{31}	R_{30}	R_{29}
R_{19}	R_{20}	R_{21}	R_{22}	R_{23}	R_{24}	R_{25}	R_{26}	R_{27}	R_{28}
R_{18}	R_{17}	R_{16}	R_{15}	R_{14}	R_{13}	R_{12}	R_{11}	R_{10}	R_{9}
		R_{1}	R_{2}	R_{3}	R_{4}	R_{5}	R_{6}	R_{7}	R_{8}

=== After the elections ===
		D_{1}	D_{2}	D_{3}	D_{4}	D_{5}	D_{6}	D_{7}	D_{8}
D_{18}	D_{17}	D_{16}	D_{15}	D_{14}	D_{13}	D_{12}	D_{11}	D_{10}	D_{9}
D_{19}	D_{20}	D_{21}	D_{22}	D_{23}	D_{24}	D_{25}	D_{26}	D_{27} Ala. Re-elected	D_{28} Ark. Re-elected
D_{38} Va. Re-elected	D_{37} Texas; Re-elected	D_{36} Tenn. (sp); Elected (Note: Appointee elected) Tenn. (reg); Hold	D_{35} S.C. Hold	D_{34} N.C. Hold	D_{33} N.M. Re-elected	D_{32} Mont. Re-elected	D_{31} Miss. Re-elected	D_{30} La. Hold	D_{29} Ga. Re-elected
D_{39} Colo. Gain	D_{40} Ill. Gain	D_{41} Kan. (sp); Gain (Note: Appointee defeated)	D_{42} Ky. (reg); Ky. (sp); Gain	D_{43} Mass. Gain	D_{44} Ohio (sp); Gain	D_{45} Okla. Gain	D_{46} S.D. Gain	D_{47} W.Va. Gain	FL_{1}
Majority with Republican vice president ↓
R_{39} Mich. Re-elected	R_{40} Minn. Re-elected	R_{41} Neb. Re-elected	R_{42} N.H. Re-elected	R_{43} N.J. (reg); N.J. (sp); Hold	R_{44} Ore. Re-elected	R_{45} Pa. (sp); Hold	R_{46} R.I. Re-elected	R_{47} Wyo. (reg); Wyo. (sp); Retired	R_{48} Iowa; Gain
R_{38} Maine; Hold	R_{37} Kan. (reg); Re-elected	R_{36} Idaho; Re-elected	R_{35} Del. (reg); Del. (sp); Elected	R_{34}	R_{33}	R_{32}	R_{31}	R_{30}	R_{29}
R_{19}	R_{20}	R_{21}	R_{22}	R_{23}	R_{24}	R_{25}	R_{26}	R_{27}	R_{28}
R_{18}	R_{17}	R_{16}	R_{15}	R_{14}	R_{13}	R_{12}	R_{11}	R_{10}	R_{9}
		R_{1}	R_{2}	R_{3}	R_{4}	R_{5}	R_{6}	R_{7}	R_{8}

Key

D_{#}	Democratic
FL_{#}	Farmer–Labor
R_{#}	Republican

== Race summary ==
=== Special elections during the 71st Congress ===
In these special elections, the winner were seated during 1930; ordered by election date (then by state).

State	Incumbent			Results	Candidates
State	Senator	Party	Electoral history	Results	Candidates
Delaware (Class 2)	Daniel O. Hastings	Republican	1928 (Appointed)	Interim appointee elected November 4, 1930. Winner was also elected on the same ballot to the next term; see below.	▌ ✓ Daniel O. Hastings (Republican) 54.5%; ▌Thomas F. Bayard Jr. (Democratic) 45.4%
Kansas (Class 3)	Henry J. Allen	Republican	1929 (Appointed)	Interim appointee lost election. New senator elected November 4, 1930. Democratic gain.	▌ ✓ George McGill (Democratic) 50.0%; ▌Henry J. Allen (Republican) 48.0%
Kentucky (Class 2)	John M. Robsion	Republican	1930 (Appointed)	Interim appointee lost election. New senator elected November 4, 1930. Democratic gain. Winner was not elected to the next term; see below.	▌ ✓ Ben M. Williamson (Democratic) 52.3%; ▌John M. Robsion (Republican) 47.7%
New Jersey (Class 2)	David Baird Jr.	Republican	1929 (Appointed)	Interim appointee retired. New senator elected November 4, 1930. Republican hold. Winner also elected to the next term, see below.	▌ ✓ Dwight Morrow (Republican) 59.1%; ▌Alexander Simpson (Democratic) 38.6%
Ohio (Class 3)	Roscoe C. McCulloch	Republican	1929 (Appointed)	Interim appointee lost election. New senator elected November 4, 1930. Democratic gain.	▌ ✓ Robert J. Bulkley (Democratic) 54.8%; ▌Roscoe C. McCulloch (Republican) 45.2%
Pennsylvania (Class 3)	Joseph R. Grundy	Republican	1929 (Appointed)	Interim appointee lost nomination. New senator elected November 4, 1930. Republican hold.	▌ ✓ James J. Davis (Republican) 71.5%; ▌Sedgwick Kistler (Democratic) 25.6%
Tennessee (Class 2)	William E. Brock	Democratic	1929 (Appointed)	Interim appointee elected November 4, 1930. Winner was not elected to the next term; see below.	▌ ✓ William E. Brock (Democratic) 74.4%; ▌F. Todd Meacham (Republican) 25.6%
Wyoming (Class 2)	Patrick J. Sullivan	Republican	1929 (Appointed)	Interim appointee retired. New senator elected November 4, 1930. Republican hold. Winner also elected to the next term; see below.	▌ ✓ Robert D. Carey (Republican) 58.8%; ▌Harry Schwartz (Democratic) 41.2%

=== Elections leading to the 72nd Congress ===
In these general elections, the winners were elected for the term beginning March 4, 1931; ordered by state.

All of the elections involved the Class 2 seats.

State	Incumbent			Results	Candidates
State	Senator	Party	Electoral history	Results	Candidates
Alabama	J. Thomas Heflin	Democratic	1920 (special); 1924	Incumbent lost renomination. Incumbent lost general election as an independent. New senator elected. Democratic hold.	▌ ✓ John H. Bankhead II (Democratic) 59.7%; ▌J. Thomas Heflin (Independent) 40.3%
Arkansas	Joseph T. Robinson	Democratic	1913; 1918; 1924	Incumbent re-elected.	▌ ✓ Joseph T. Robinson (Democratic); Unopposed
Colorado	Lawrence C. Phipps	Republican	1918; 1924	Incumbent retired. New senator elected. Democratic gain.	▌ ✓ Edward P. Costigan (Democratic) 55.9%; ▌George H. Shaw (Republican) 42.7%
Delaware	Daniel O. Hastings	Republican	1928 (Appointed)	Interim appointee elected. Winner was also elected on the same ballot to finish the current term; see above.	▌ ✓ Daniel O. Hastings (Republican) 54.5%; ▌Thomas F. Bayard Jr. (Democratic) 45.4%
Georgia	William J. Harris	Democratic	1918; 1924	Incumbent re-elected.	▌ ✓ William J. Harris (Democratic); Unopposed
Idaho	William Borah	Republican	1907; 1913; 1918; 1924	Incumbent re-elected.	▌ ✓ William Borah (Republican)72.4%; ▌Joseph M. Tyler (Democratic) 27.6%
Illinois	Charles S. Deneen	Republican	1924; 1925 (Appointed) (Note: Appointed in February 1925, having already been elected in 1924 to begin the March term.)	Incumbent lost renomination. New senator elected. Democratic gain.	▌ ✓ J. Hamilton Lewis (Democratic) 64.0%; ▌Ruth Hanna McCormick (Republican) 30.7%
Iowa	Daniel F. Steck	Democratic	1926 (Challenge)	Incumbent lost re-election. New senator elected. Republican gain.	▌ ✓ L. J. Dickinson (Republican) 56.3%; ▌Daniel F. Steck (Democratic) 43.0%
Kansas	Arthur Capper	Republican	1918; 1924	Incumbent re-elected.	▌ ✓ Arthur Capper (Republican) 61.1%; ▌Jonathan M. Davis (Democratic) 38.9%
Kentucky	John M. Robsion	Republican	1930 (Appointed)	Interim appointee lost election. New senator elected. Democratic gain.	▌ ✓ M. M. Logan (Democratic) 52.1%; ▌John M. Robsion (Republican) 47.9%
Louisiana	Joseph E. Ransdell	Democratic	1912; 1918; 1924	Incumbent lost renomination. New senator elected. Democratic hold.	▌ ✓ Huey Long (Democratic); Unopposed
Maine	Arthur R. Gould	Republican	1926 (Appointed)	Incumbent retired. New senator elected. Republican hold.	▌ ✓ Wallace H. White (Republican) 60.9%; ▌Frank W. Haskell (Democratic) 39.1%
Massachusetts	Frederick H. Gillett	Republican	1924	Incumbent retired. New senator elected. Democratic gain.	▌ ✓ Marcus A. Coolidge (Democratic) 54.0%; ▌William M. Butler (Republican) 44.7%
Michigan	James Couzens	Republican	1922 (Appointed); 1924 (special); 1924	Incumbent re-elected.	▌ ✓ James Couzens (Republican) 78.2%; ▌Thomas A. E. Weadock (Democratic) 20.9%
Minnesota	Thomas D. Schall	Republican	1924	Incumbent re-elected.	▌ ✓ Thomas D. Schall (Republican) 37.6%; ▌Einar Hoidale (Democratic) 36.1%; ▌Ernest Lundeen (Farmer–Labor) 22.9%
Mississippi	Pat Harrison	Democratic	1918; 1924	Incumbent re-elected.	▌ ✓ Pat Harrison (Democratic); Unopposed
Montana	Thomas J. Walsh	Democratic	1913; 1918; 1924	Incumbent re-elected.	▌ ✓ Thomas J. Walsh (Democratic) 60.3%; ▌Albert J. Galen (Republican) 37.9%
Nebraska	George W. Norris	Republican	1913; 1918; 1924	Incumbent re-elected.	▌ ✓ George W. Norris (Republican) 56.8%; ▌Gilbert Hitchcock (Democratic) 39.7%
New Hampshire	Henry W. Keyes	Republican	1918; 1924	Incumbent re-elected.	▌ ✓ Henry W. Keyes (Republican) 57.9%; ▌Albert W. Noone (Democratic) 41.9%
New Jersey	David Baird Jr.	Republican	1929 (Appointed)	Interim appointee retired. New senator elected. Republican hold. Winner also elected to finish the term; see above.	▌ ✓ Dwight Morrow (Republican) 58.5%; ▌Alexander Simpson (Democratic) 39.0%
New Mexico	Sam G. Bratton	Democratic	1924	Incumbent re-elected.	▌ ✓ Sam G. Bratton (Democratic) 58.6%; ▌Herbert B. Holt (Republican) 41.2%
North Carolina	F. M. Simmons	Democratic	1901; 1907; 1913; 1918; 1924	Incumbent lost renomination. New senator elected. Democratic hold.	▌ ✓ Josiah Bailey (Democratic) 60.6%; ▌George M. Pritchard (Republican) 39.4%
Oklahoma	William B. Pine	Republican	1924	Incumbent lost re-election. New senator elected. Democratic gain.	▌ ✓ Thomas Gore (Democratic) 52.3%; ▌William B. Pine (Republican) 47.5%
Oregon	Charles L. McNary	Republican	1917 (Appointed); 1918 (Not elected); 1918 (Appointed); 1918; 1924	Incumbent re-elected.	▌ ✓ Charles L. McNary (Republican) 58.1%; ▌Elton Watkins (Democratic) 27.9%; ▌L. A. Banks (Independent) 7.4%
Rhode Island	Jesse H. Metcalf	Republican	1924 (special); 1924	Incumbent re-elected.	▌ ✓ Jesse H. Metcalf (Republican) 50.3%; ▌Peter G. Gerry (Democratic) 49.2%
South Carolina	Cole L. Blease	Democratic	1924	Incumbent lost renomination. New senator elected. Democratic hold.	▌ ✓ James F. Byrnes (Democratic); Unopposed
South Dakota	William H. McMaster	Republican	1924	Incumbent lost re-election. New senator elected. Democratic gain.	▌ ✓ William J. Bulow (Democratic) 51.6%; ▌William H. McMaster (Republican) 48.4%
Tennessee	William E. Brock	Democratic	1929 (Appointed)	Incumbent retired. New senator elected. Democratic hold.	▌ ✓ Cordell Hull (Democratic) 71.3%; ▌Paul E. Divine (Republican) 27.1%
Texas	Morris Sheppard	Democratic	1913 (special); 1913; 1918; 1924	Incumbent re-elected.	▌ ✓ Morris Sheppard (Democratic) 86.9%; ▌D. J. Haesly (Republican) 12.7%
Virginia	Carter Glass	Democratic	1920 (Appointed); 1920 (special); 1924	Incumbent re-elected.	▌ ✓ Carter Glass (Democratic) 76.7%; ▌J. Cloyd Byars (Independent) 17.9%; ▌Joe C. Morgan (Socialist) 5.4%
West Virginia	Guy D. Goff	Republican	1924	Incumbent retired. New senator elected. Democratic gain.	▌ ✓ Matthew M. Neely (Democratic) 61.9%; ▌James E. Jones (Republican) 37.9%
Wyoming	Patrick J. Sullivan	Republican	1929 (Appointed)	Interim appointee retired. New senator elected. Republican hold. Winner was also elected to finish the term; see above.	▌ ✓ Robert D. Carey (Republican) 59.1%; ▌Harry Schwartz (Democratic) 41.0%

== Closest races ==
Ten races had a margin of victory under 10%:

State	Party of winner	Margin
Rhode Island	Republican	1.1%
Minnesota	Republican	1.5% (Note: Minnesota was the "tipping point" state.)
Kansas (special)	Democratic (flip)	2.0%
South Dakota	Democratic (flip)	3.2%
Kentucky (regular)	Democratic (flip)	4.2%
Kentucky (special)	Democratic (flip)	4.6%
Oklahoma	Democratic (flip)	4.8%
Delaware	Republican	9.1%
Massachusetts	Democratic (flip)	9.3%
Ohio	Democratic (flip)	9.6%

== Alabama ==
1930 United States Senate election in Alabama
- November 4, 1930
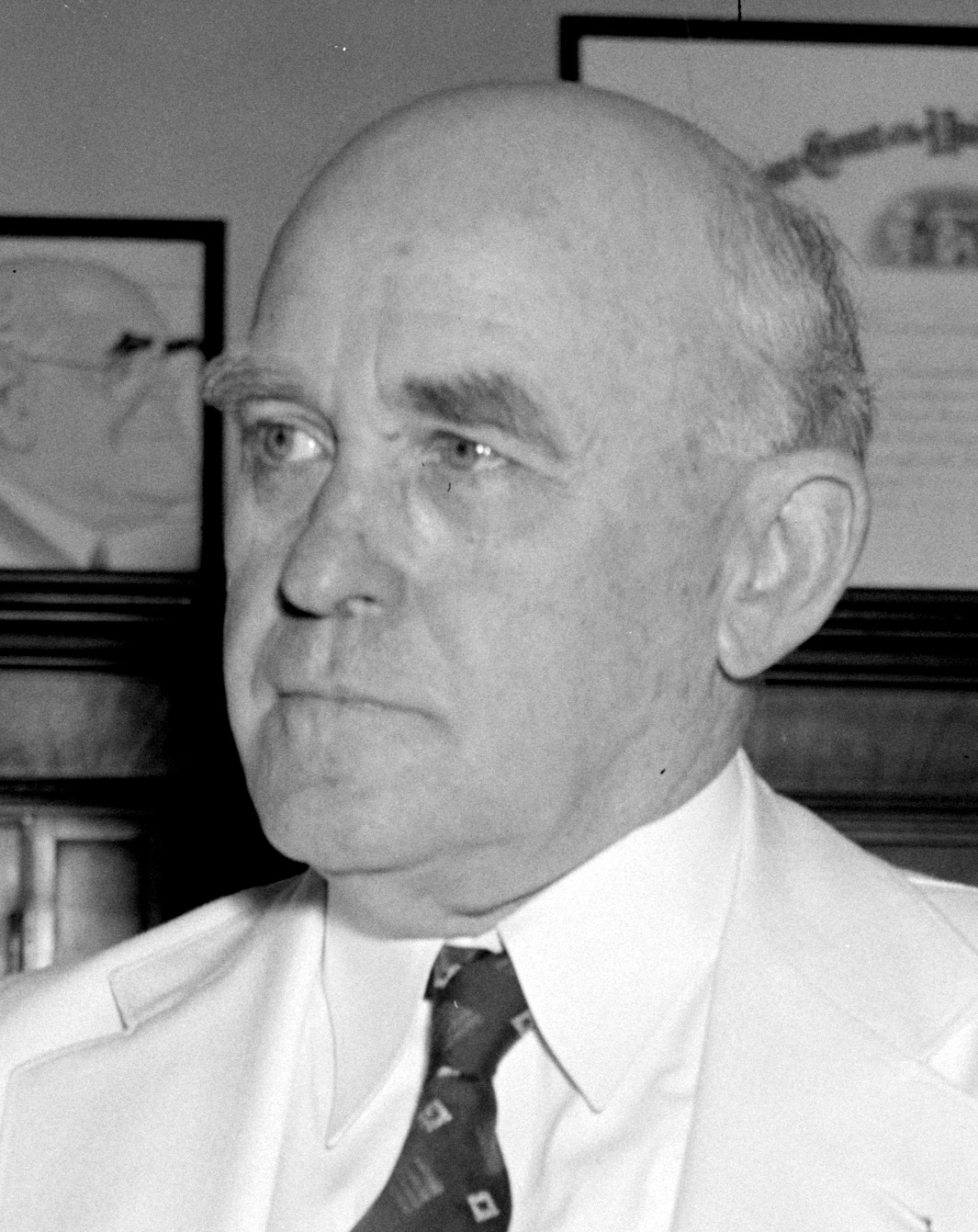

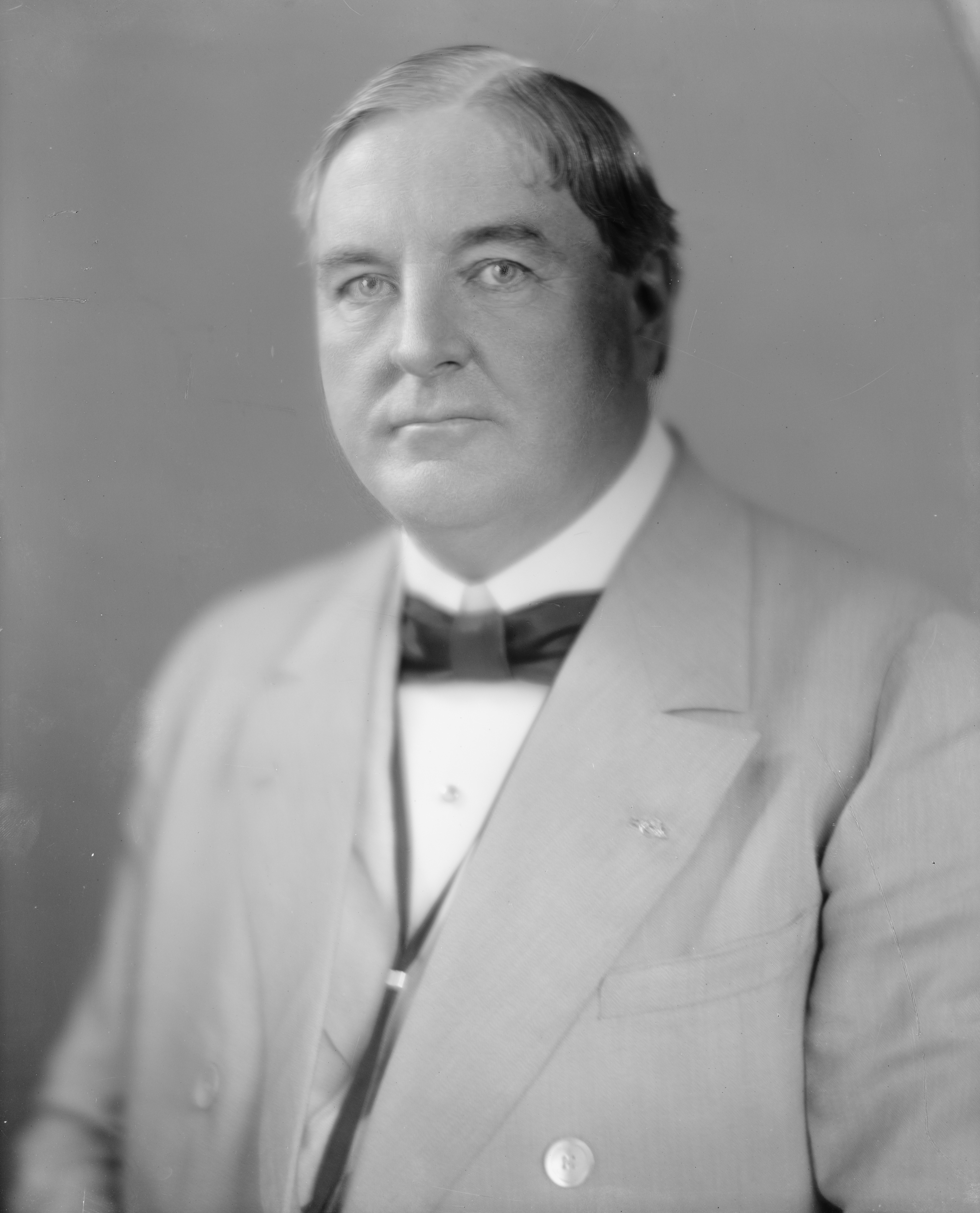
Candidate	John H. Bankhead II	James Thomas Heflin
Party	Democratic	Independent Democrat
Popular vote	150,985	100,952
Percentage	59.93%	40.07%
- County results Bankhead: 50–60% 60–70% 70–80% 80–90% 90–100% Heflin: 50–60% 60–70%
U.S. senator before election
James Thomas Heflin
Democratic
Elected U.S. Senator
John H. Bankhead II
Democratic

1930 United States Senate election in Alabama
Party	Candidate	Votes	%
Democratic	John H. Bankhead II	150,985	59.93
Independent	James Thomas Heflin (Incumbent)	100,952	40.07
Majority		50,033	19.96
Turnout		251,937	
Democratic gain from Independent			

== Arkansas ==
1930 U.S. Senate Democratic primary in Arkansas
- August 12, 1930
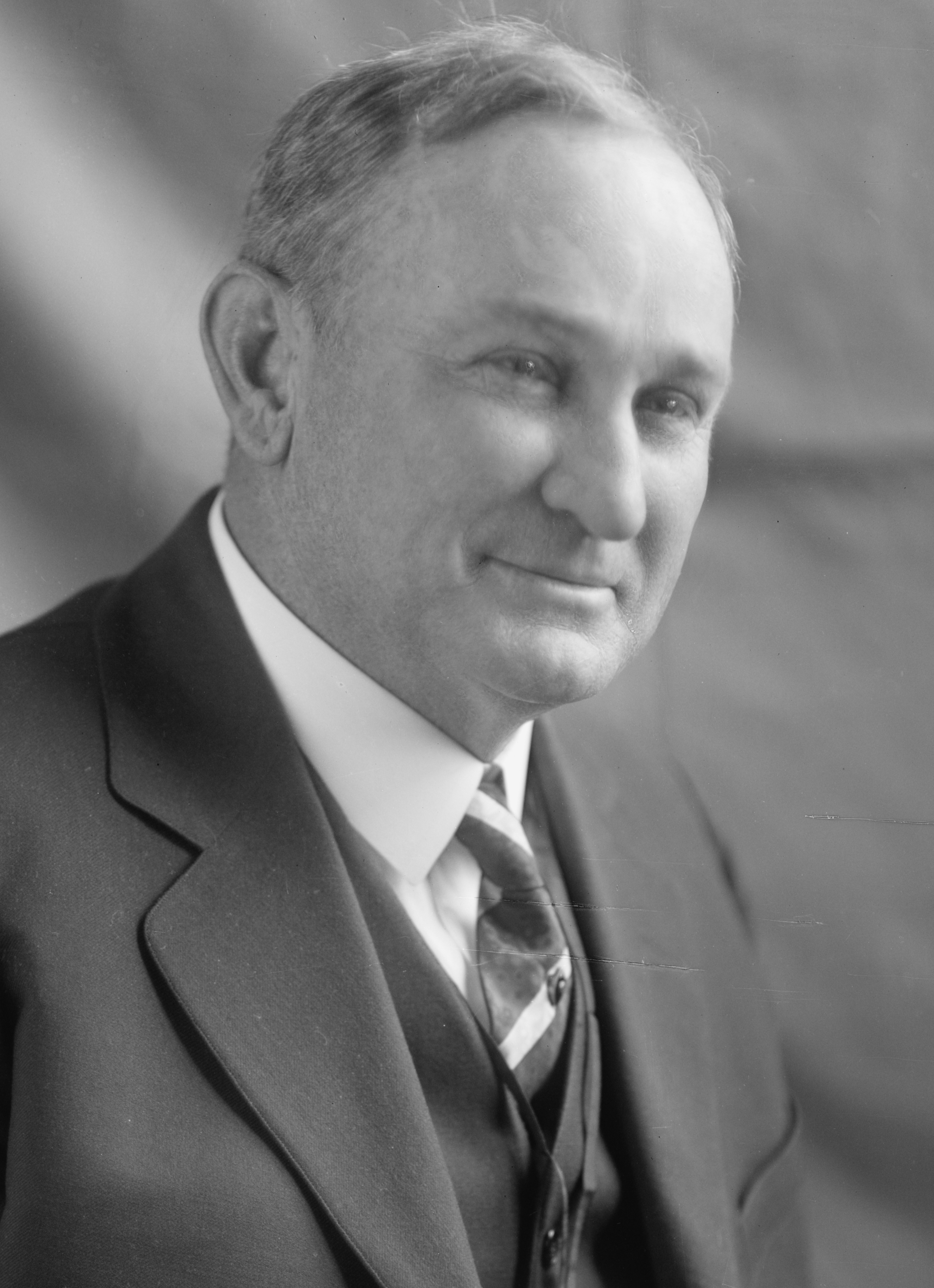

Nominee	Joe T. Robinson	Tom W. Campbell
Party	Democratic	Democratic
Popular vote	167,167	51,085
Percentage	76.59%	23.41%
U.S. senator before election
Joseph Taylor Robinson
Democratic
Elected U.S. Senator
Joseph Taylor Robinson
Democratic

1930 United States Senate election in Arkansas
Party	Candidate	Votes	%
Democratic	Joseph T. Robinson (Incumbent)	141,906	100.00
Democratic hold			

== Colorado ==
1930 United States Senate election in Colorado
- November 4, 1930
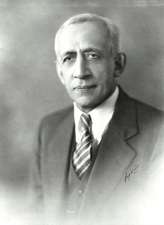
Nominee	Edward P. Costigan	George H. Shaw
Party	Democratic	Republican
Popular vote	180,028	137,487
Percentage	55.85%	42.65%
- County results Costigan: 40–50% 50–60% 60–70% Shaw: 40–50% 50–60% 60–70%
U.S. senator before election
Lawrence C. Phipps
Republican
Elected U.S. Senator
Edward P. Costigan
Democratic

1930 United States Senate election in Colorado
Party	Candidate	Votes	%
Democratic	Edward P. Costigan	180,028	55.85
Republican	George H. Shaw	137,487	42.65
Socialist	Morton Alexander	1,745	0.54
Farmer–Labor	H. H. Marrs	1,367	0.42
Communist	James Allander	924	0.29
Liberal Party (US)	Frank H. Rice	451	0.14
Commonwealth Land	August Lutteken	339	0.11
Majority		42,541	13.20
Turnout		322,341	
Democratic gain from Republican			

== Delaware ==
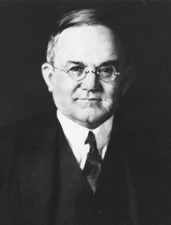
Senator Daniel O. Hastings

Interim appointee Daniel O. Hastings was elected both to finish the current term and to the next term on the same November 4 ballot.

=== Delaware (regular) ===
Delaware regular election, November 4, 1930
Party	Candidate	Votes	%
Republican	Daniel O. Hastings (Incumbent)	47,909	54.49
Democratic	Thomas F. Bayard Jr.	39,881	45.36
Independent	Nicholas Minutella	135	0.15
Majority		8,028	9.13
Turnout		87,925	36.88
Republican hold			

=== Delaware (special) ===
Delaware special election, November 4, 1930
Party	Candidate	Votes	%
Republican	Daniel O. Hastings (Incumbent)	47,909	54.49
Democratic	Thomas F. Bayard Jr.	39,881	45.36
Independent	Nicholas Minutella	135	0.15
Majority		8,028	9.13
Turnout		87,925	36.88
Republican hold			

== Georgia ==
1930 United States Senate election in Georgia
Party	Candidate	Votes	%
Democratic	William J. Harris (Incumbent)	56,502	100.00
Independent	Wallace Miller	1	0.00
Majority		56,501	100.00
Turnout		56,503	
Democratic hold			

== Idaho ==
1930 United States Senate election in Idaho
- November 4, 1930
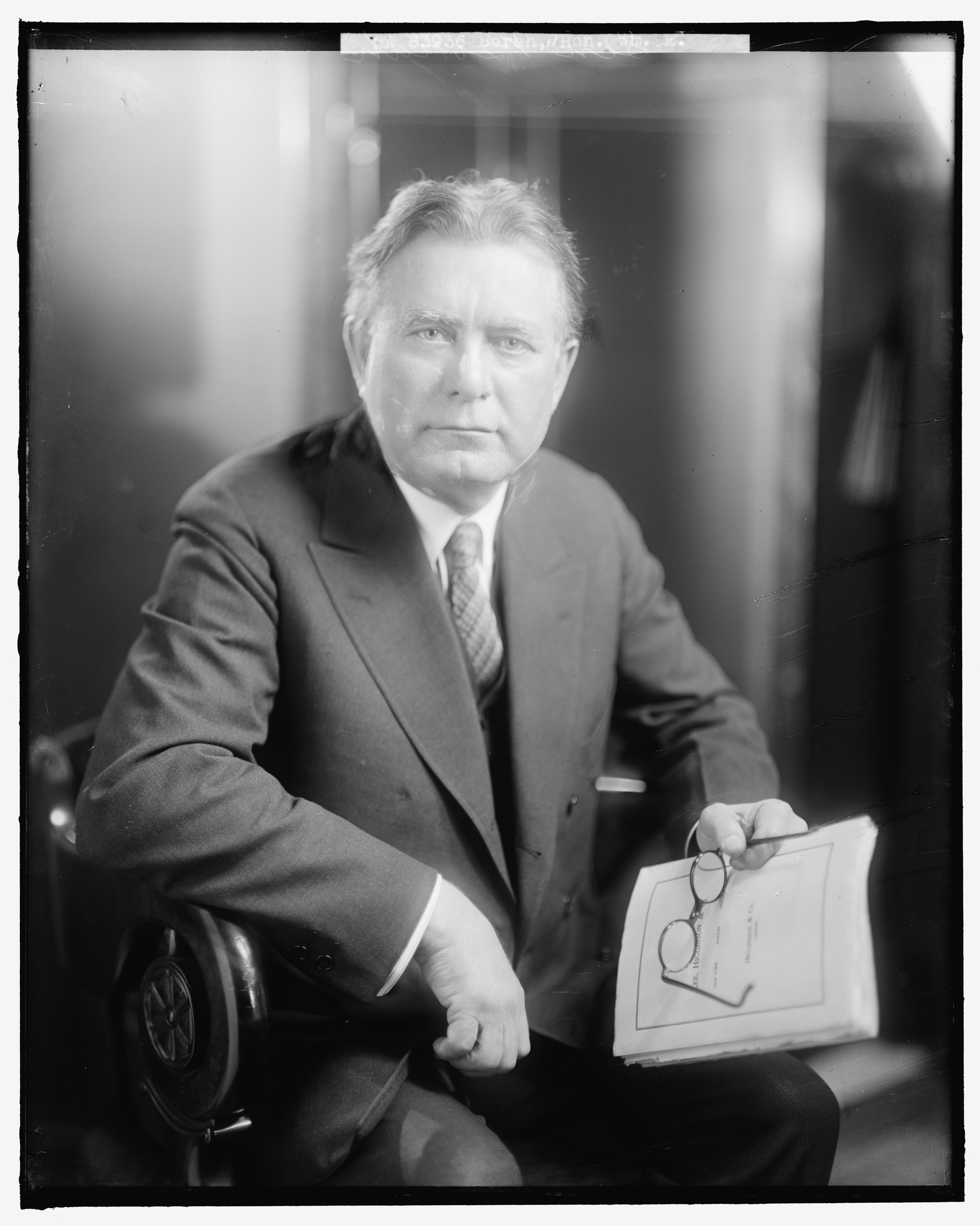
Nominee	William Borah	Joseph M. Tyler
Party	Republican	Democratic
Popular vote	94,938	36,162
Percentage	72.42%	27.58%
- County results Borah: 60–70% 70–80% 80–90%
U.S. senator before election
William Borah
Republican
Elected U.S. Senator
William Borah
Republican

1930 United States Senate election in Idaho
Party	Candidate	Votes	%
Republican	William Borah (Incumbent)	94,938	72.42%
Democratic	Joseph M. Tyler	36,162	27.58%
Majority		58,776	44.84
Turnout		131,100	
Republican hold			

== Illinois ==
1930 United States Senate election in Illinois
- November 4, 1930
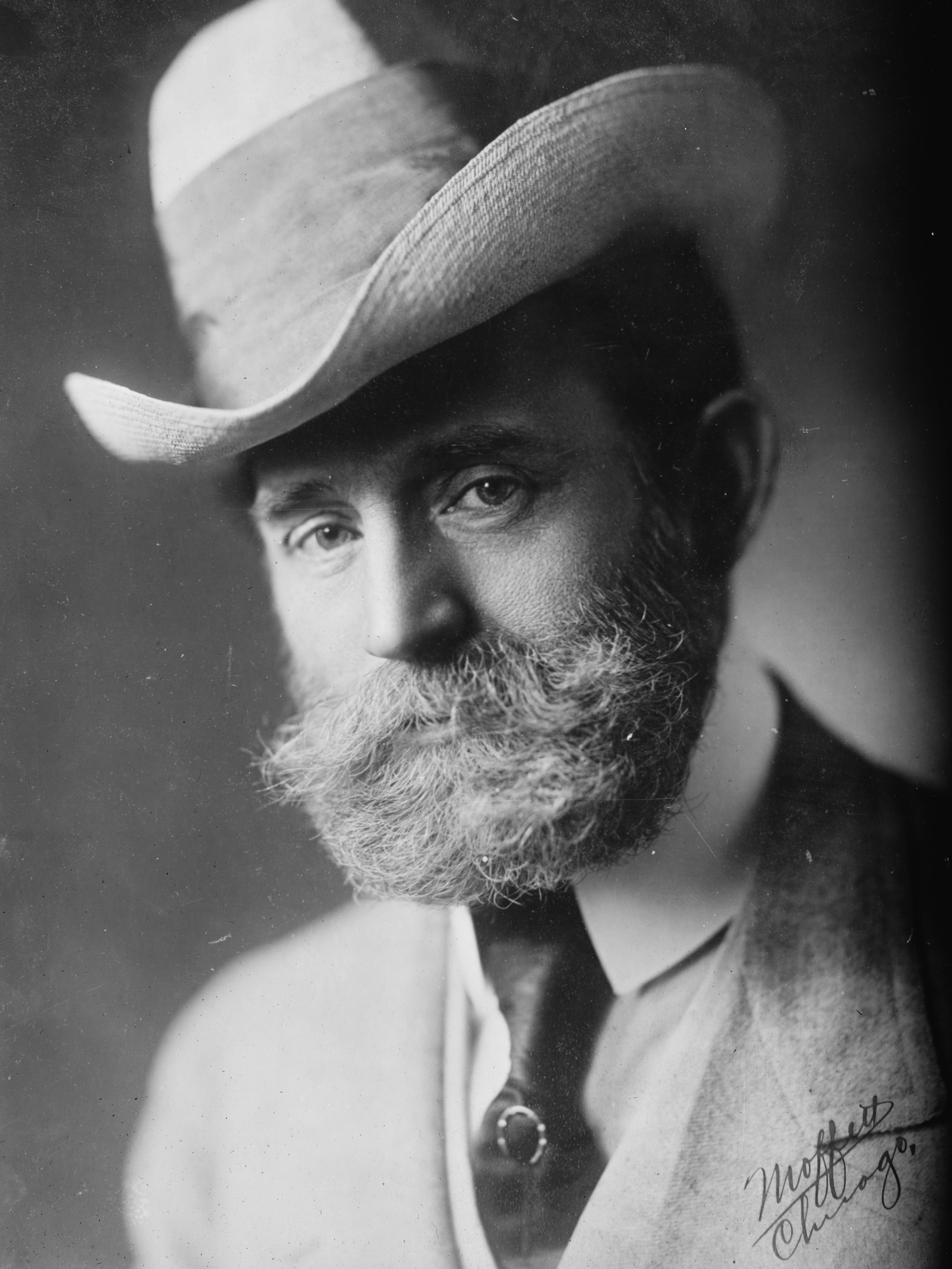

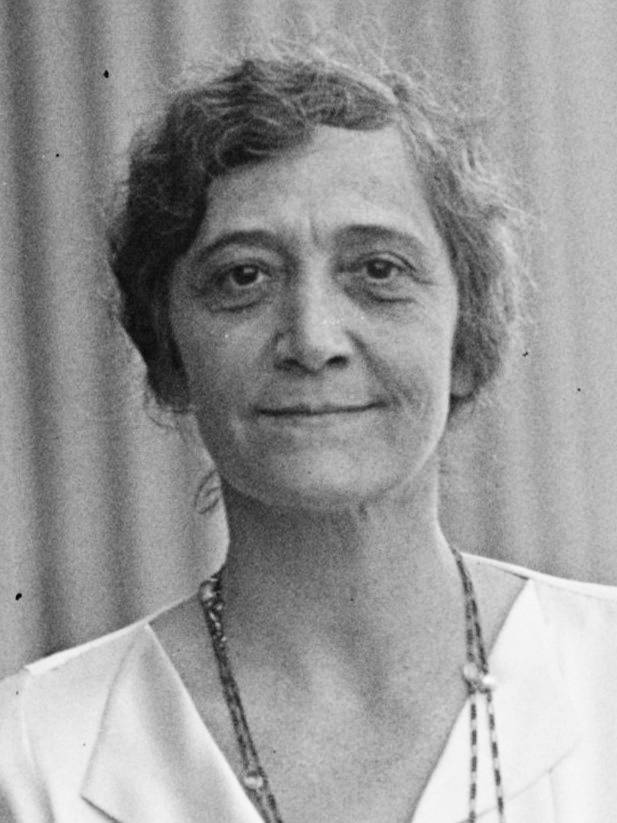
Nominee	J. Hamilton Lewis	Ruth Hanna McCormick
Party	Democratic	Republican
Popular vote	1,432,216	687,469
Percentage	64.02%	30.73%
- Results by county Lewis: 40–50% 50–60% 60–70% 70–80% 80–90% Hanna McCormick: 40–50% 50–60%
U.S. senator before election
Charles S. Deneen
Republican
Elected U.S. senator
J. Hamilton Lewis
Democratic

1930 United States Senate election in Illinois
Party	Candidate	Votes	%
Democratic	J. Hamilton Lewis	1,432,216	64.02
Republican	Ruth Hanna McCormick	687,469	30.73
Independent Republican	Lottie Holman O'Neill	99,485	4.45
Socialist	George Koop	11,192	0.50
Communist	Freeman Thompson	3,118	0.14
Peace and Prosperity	Louis Warner	1,078	0.05
American National	Ernest Stout	1,060	0.05
Anti-League World Court, Anti-Foreign Entanglements	C. Emmet Smith	763	0.03
Liberty	James J. McGrath	723	0.03
Majority		744,747	33.29
Turnout		2,237,104	
Democratic gain from Republican			

== Iowa ==
1930 United States Senate election in Iowa
- November 4, 1930
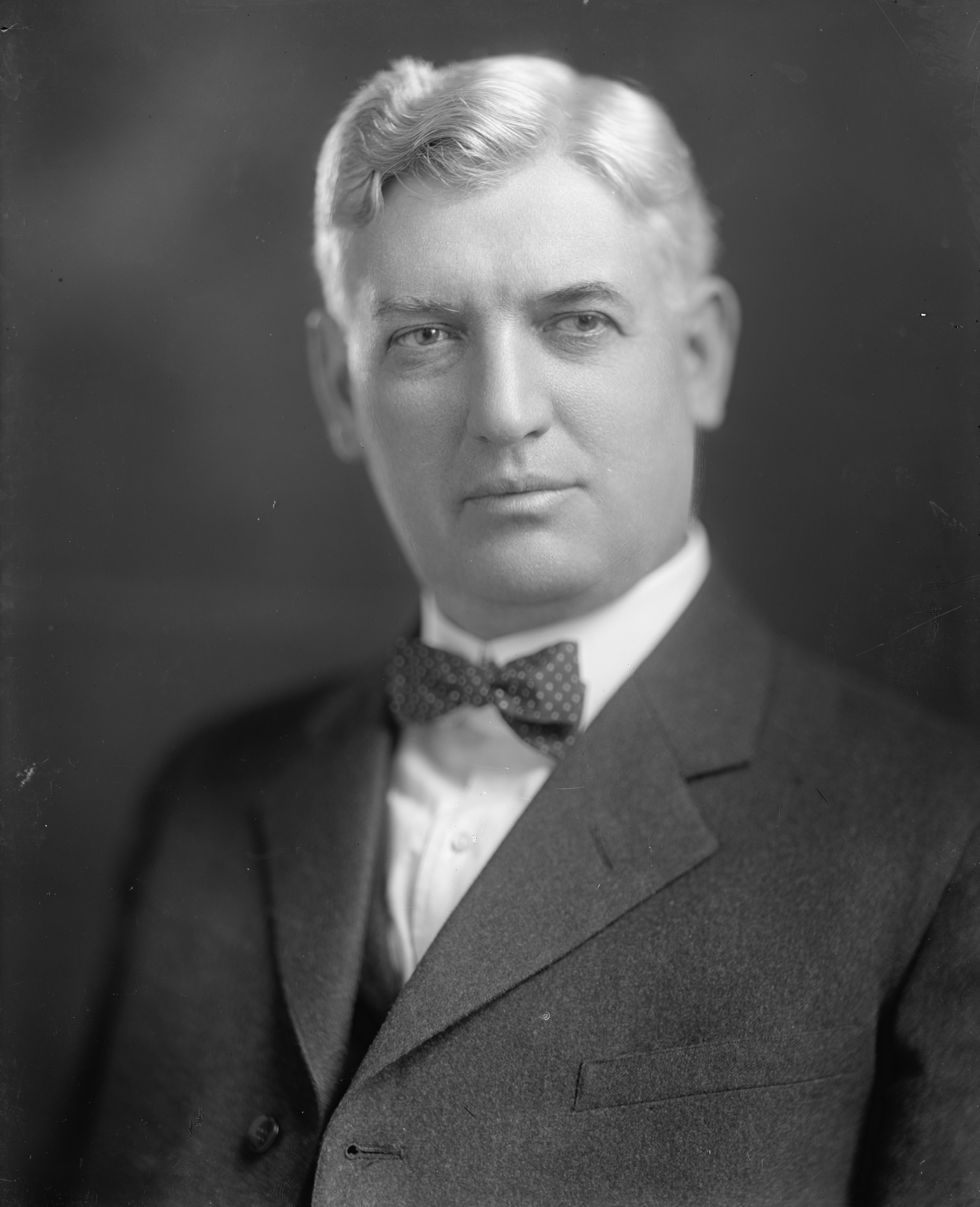

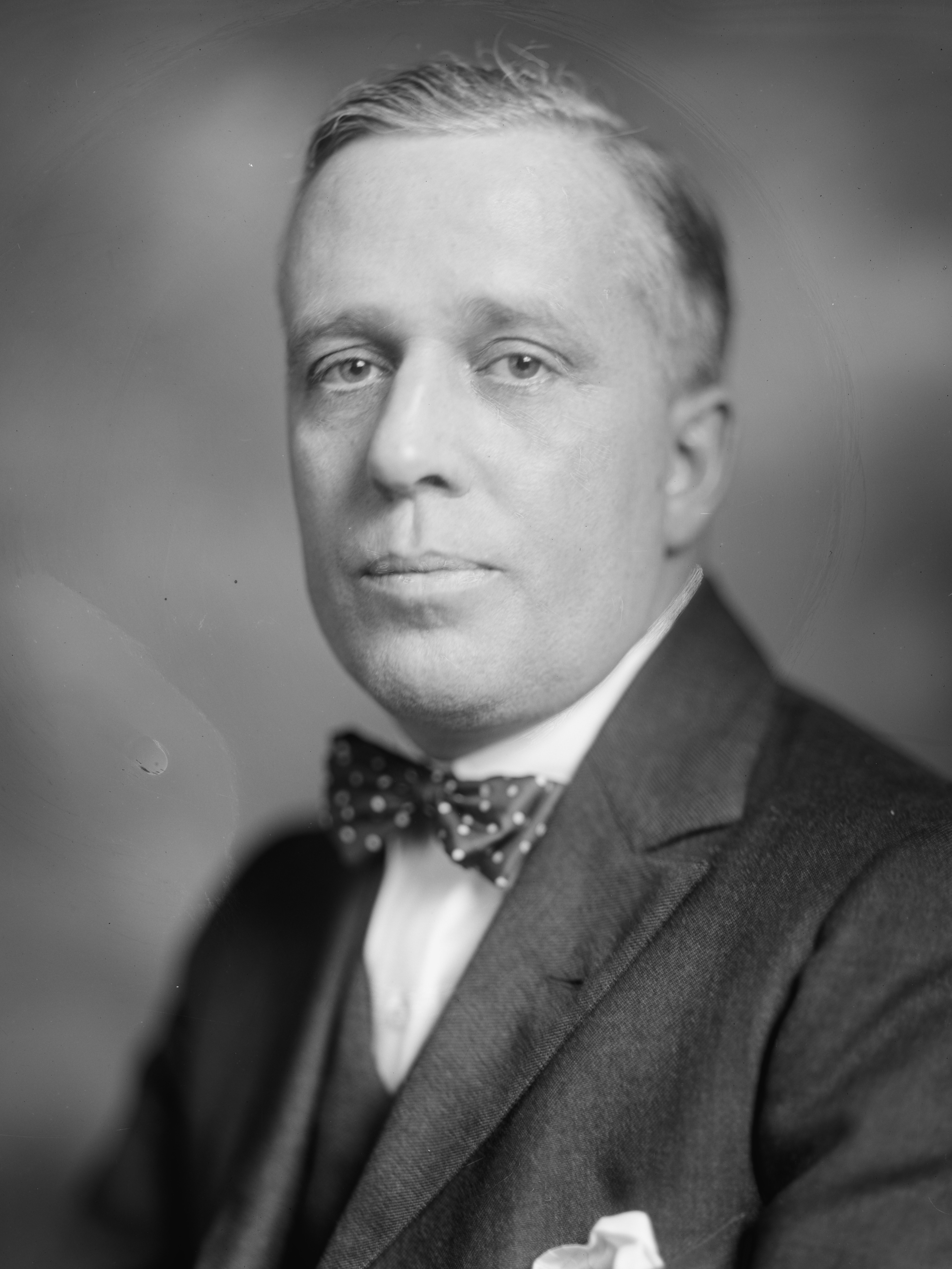
Nominee	L. J. Dickinson	Daniel F. Steck
Party	Republican	Democratic
Popular vote	307,613	235,186
Percentage	56.29%	43.03%
- County Results; Dickinson: 50–60% 60–70% 70–80% Steck: 50–60% 60–70%
U.S. senator before election
Daniel F. Steck
Democratic
Elected U.S. Senator
Lester J. Dickinson
Republican

1930 United States Senate election in Iowa
Party	Candidate	Votes	%
Republican	Lester J. Dickinson	307,613	56.29
Democratic	Daniel F. Steck (Incumbent)	235,186	43.03
Independent	Arthur A. Wells	2,668	0.49
Independent	L. E. Eickelberg	1,045	0.19
Majority		72,427	13.26
Turnout		546,512	
Republican gain from Democratic			

== Kansas ==
=== Kansas (regular) ===
1930 United States Senate election in Kansas
- November 4, 1930
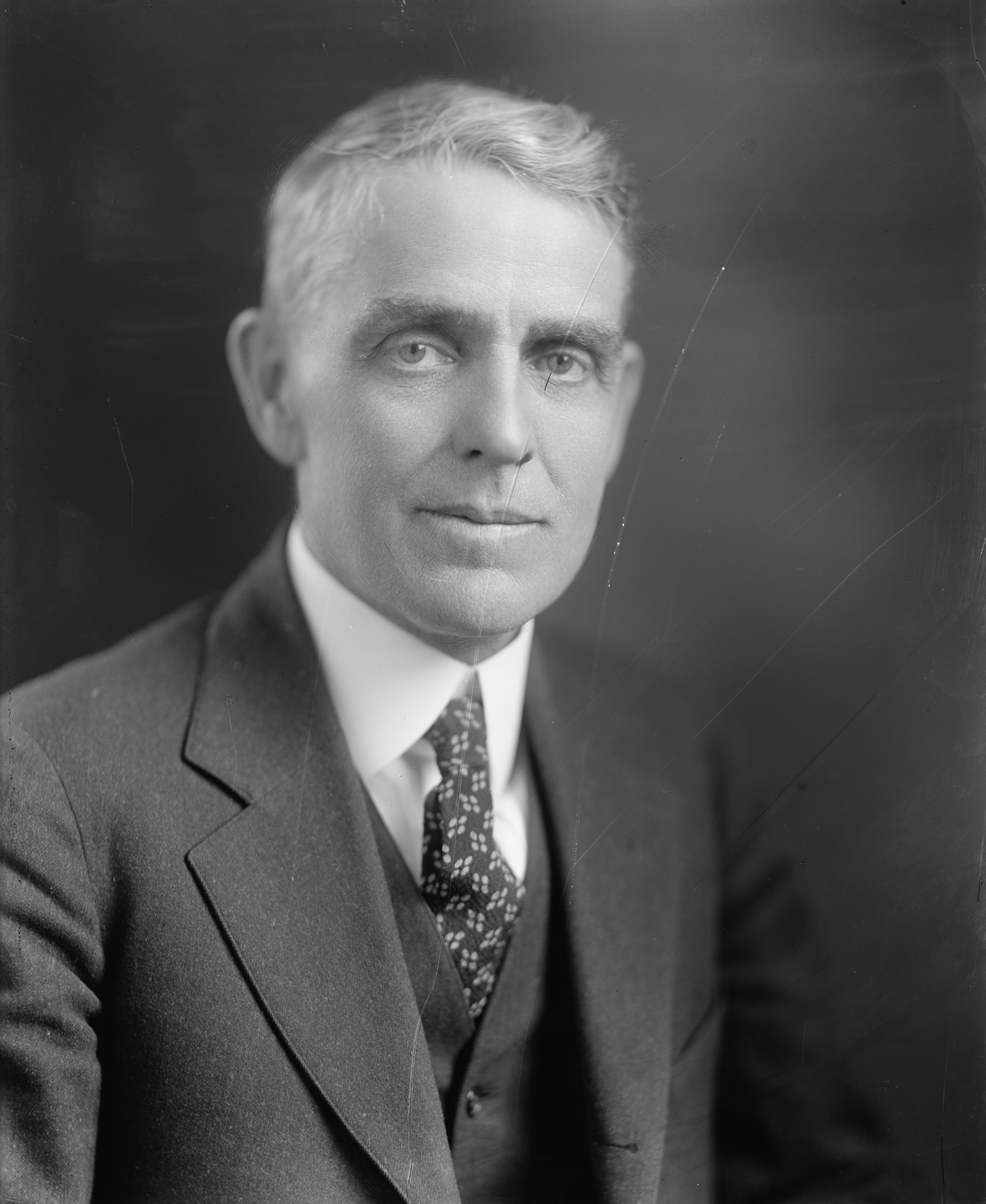

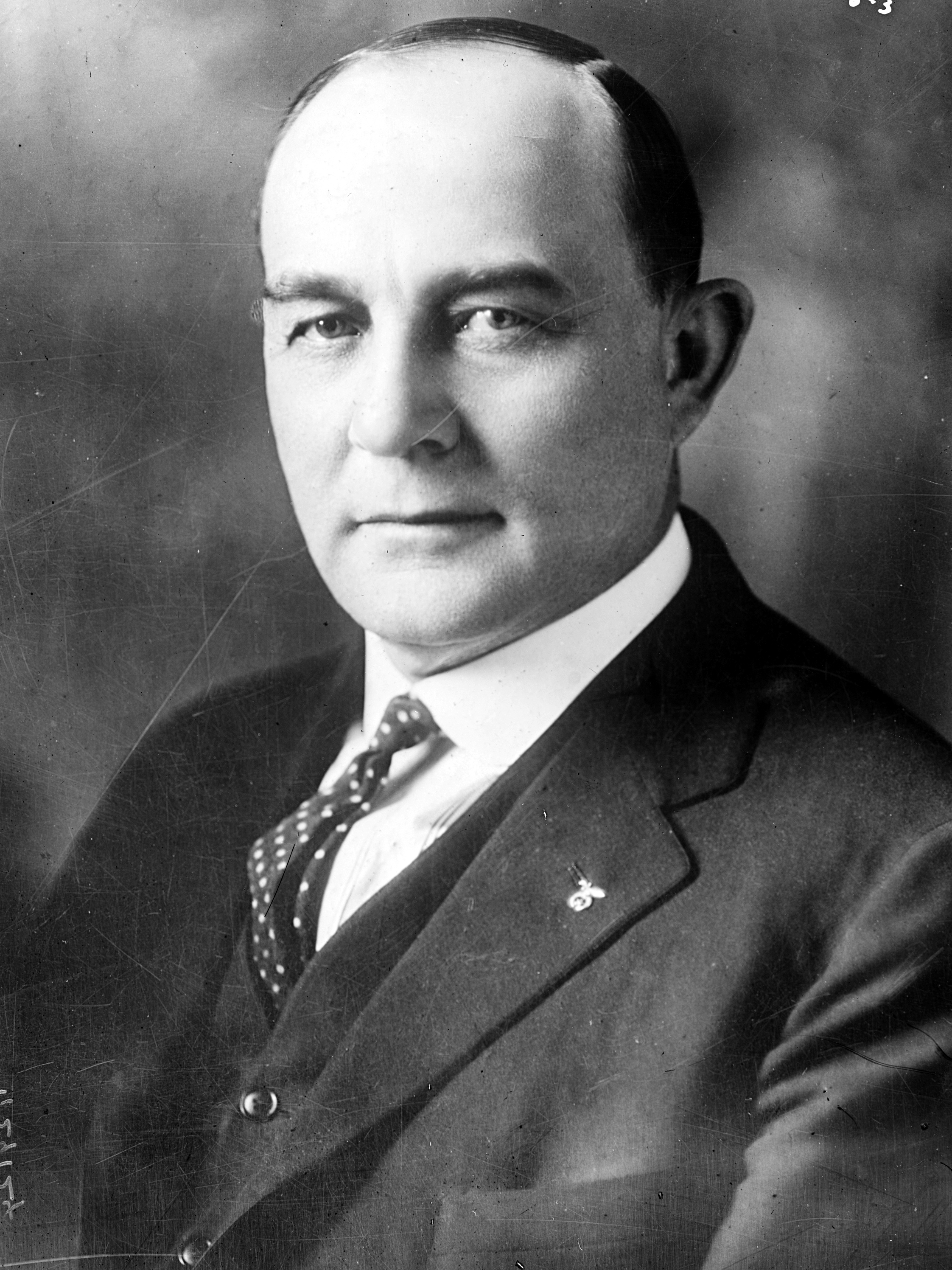
Nominee	Arthur Capper	Jonathan M. Davis
Party	Republican	Democratic
Popular vote	364,548	232,161
Percentage	61.09%	38.91%
- County results Capper: 50–60% 60–70% 70–80% Davis: 50–60% 60–70%
U.S. senator before election
Arthur Capper
Republican
Elected U.S. Senator
Arthur Capper
Republican

Kansas regular election
Party	Candidate	Votes	%
Republican	Arthur Capper (Incumbent)	364,548	61.09
Democratic	Jonathan M. Davis	232,161	38.91
Majority		132,387	22.18
Turnout		596,709	
Republican hold			

=== Kansas (special) ===
1930 United States Senate special election in Kansas
- November 4, 1930
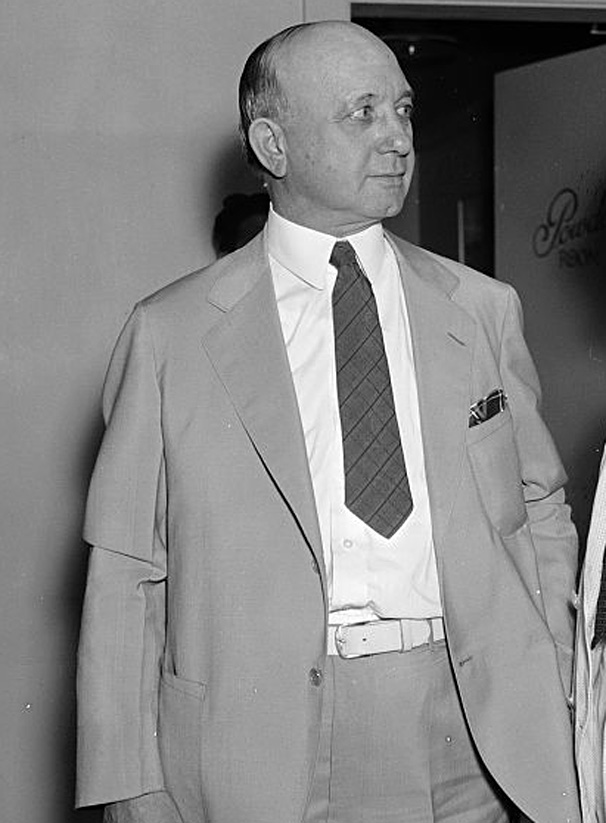

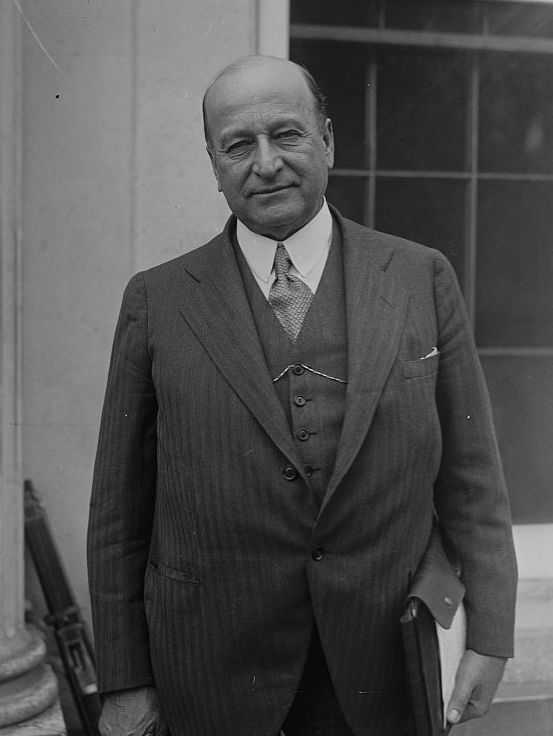
Nominee	George McGill	Henry Justin Allen
Party	Democratic	Republican
Popular vote	288,889	276,833
Percentage	50.03%	47.95%
- County results McGill: 40–50% 50–60% 60–70% Allen: 40–50% 50–60% 60–70%
U.S. senator before election
Henry Justin Allen
Republican
Elected U.S. Senator
George McGill
Democratic

Democratic nominee George McGill defeated Republican appointed United States Senator Henry Justin Allen by a very narrow margin, Allen having won a contested primary against four-term Congressman William H. Sproul. McGill was the first non-Republican to win this seat since 1896. McGill was the last Democrat to be elected senator in Kansas until Adam Hamilton in 2026.

Kansas special election
Party	Candidate	Votes	%
Democratic	George McGill	288,889	50.03
Republican	Henry Justin Allen (Incumbent)	276,833	47.95
Socialist	H. M. Perkins	11,659	2.02
Majority		12,056	0.08
Turnout		577,381	
Democratic gain from Republican			

== Kentucky ==
=== Kentucky (regular) ===
1930 United States Senate election in Kentucky
- November 4, 1930
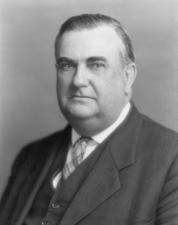

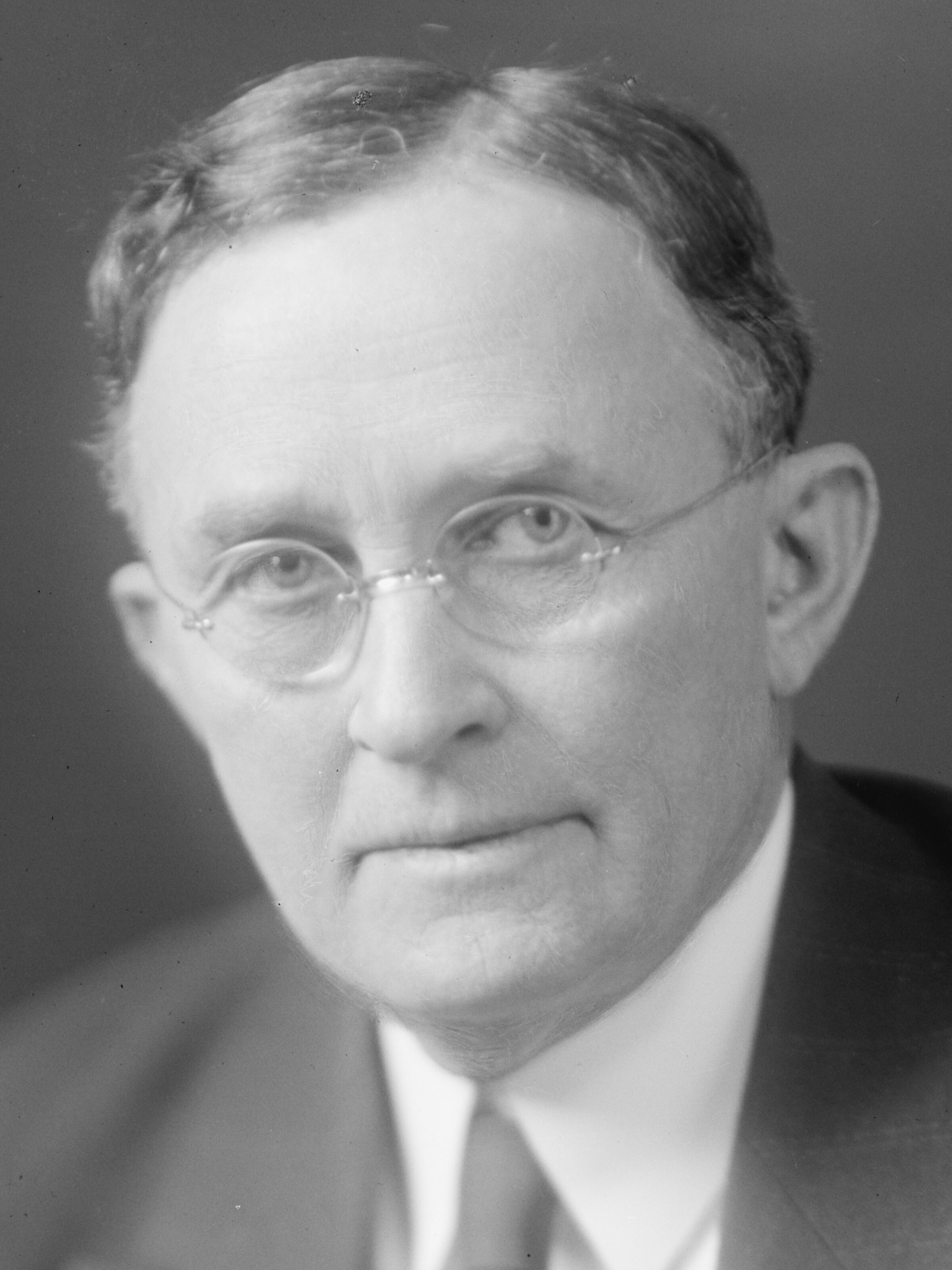
Nominee	M. M. Logan	John M. Robsion
Party	Democratic	Republican
Popular vote	336,718	309,180
Percentage	52.13%	47.87%
- County results Logan: 50–60% 60–70% 70–80% 80–90% Robsion: 50–60% 60–70% 70–80% 80–90%
U.S. senator before election
John M. Robsion
Republican
Elected U.S. Senator
Ben M. Williamson
(for unexpired term)
M. M. Logan (for next term)
Democratic

Kentucky regular election
Party	Candidate	Votes	%
Democratic	M. M. Logan	336,718	52.13
Republican	John M. Robsion (incumbent)	309,180	47.87
Majority		27,538	4.26
Turnout		645,898	
Democratic hold			

=== Kentucky (special) ===
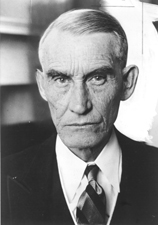
Senator Ben M. Williamson

Kentucky special election
Party	Candidate	Votes	%
Democratic	Ben M. Williamson	326,723	52.34
Republican	John M. Robsion (Incumbent)	297,510	47.66
Majority		29,213	4.68
Turnout		624,233	
Democratic gain from Republican			

== Louisiana ==
1930 Democratic Senate primary election in Louisiana
- September 9, 1930
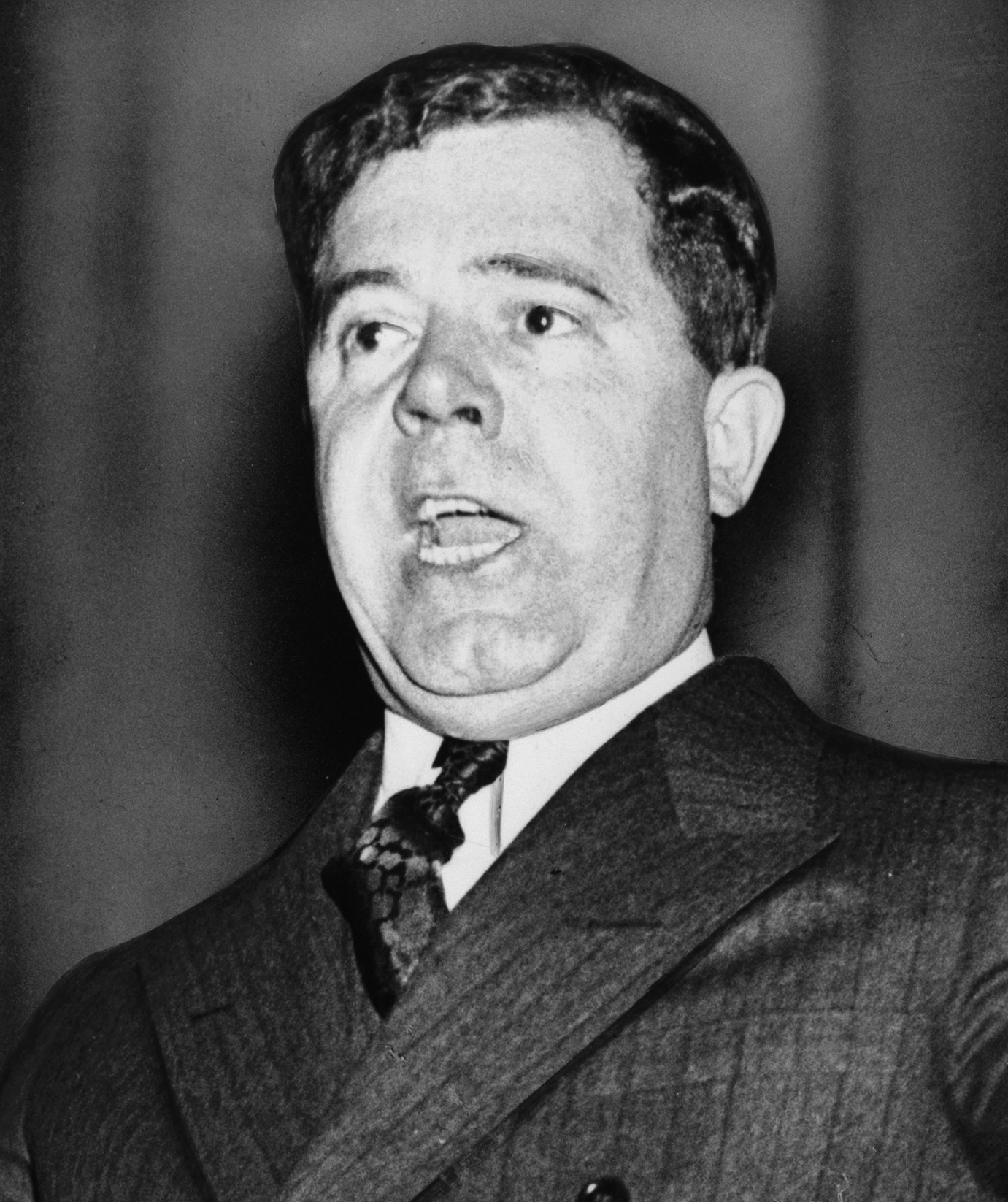

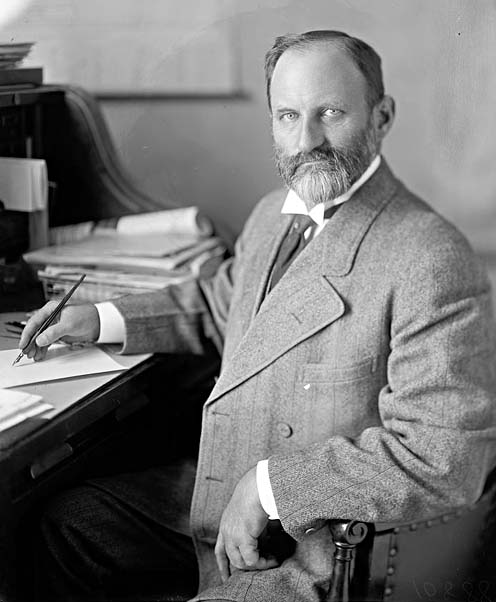
Nominee	Huey Long	Joseph Ransdell
Party	Democratic	Democratic
Popular vote	149,640	111,451
Percentage	57.31%	42.69%
Parish Results
Long
50–60%
60–70%
70–80%
80–90%
90–100%
Ransdell
50–60%
60–70%
70–80%
80–90%
U.S. senator before election
Joseph E. Ransdell
Democratic
Elected U.S. Senator
Huey Long
Democratic

1930 United States Senate election in Louisiana
Party	Candidate	Votes	%
Democratic	Huey Long	130,536	99.98
None	Scattering	24	0.02
Majority		130,512	99.96
Turnout		130,560	
Democratic hold			

== Maine ==
1930 United States Senate election in Maine
- September 8, 1930
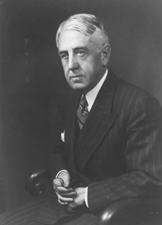

Nominee	Wallace White	Frank Haskell
Party	Republican	Democratic
Popular vote	88,262	56,559
Percentage	60.95%	39.05%
- County results White: 50–60% 60–70% 70–80%
U.S. senator before election
Arthur Gould
Republican
Elected U.S. Senator
Wallace H. White Jr.
Republican

1930 United States Senate election in Maine
Party	Candidate	Votes	%
Republican	Wallace H. White Jr.	88,262	60.95
Democratic	Frank W. Haskell	56,559	39.05
Majority		31,703	21.90
Turnout		144,821	
Republican hold			

== Massachusetts ==
1930 United States Senate election in Massachusetts
- November 4, 1930
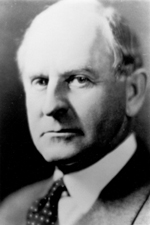

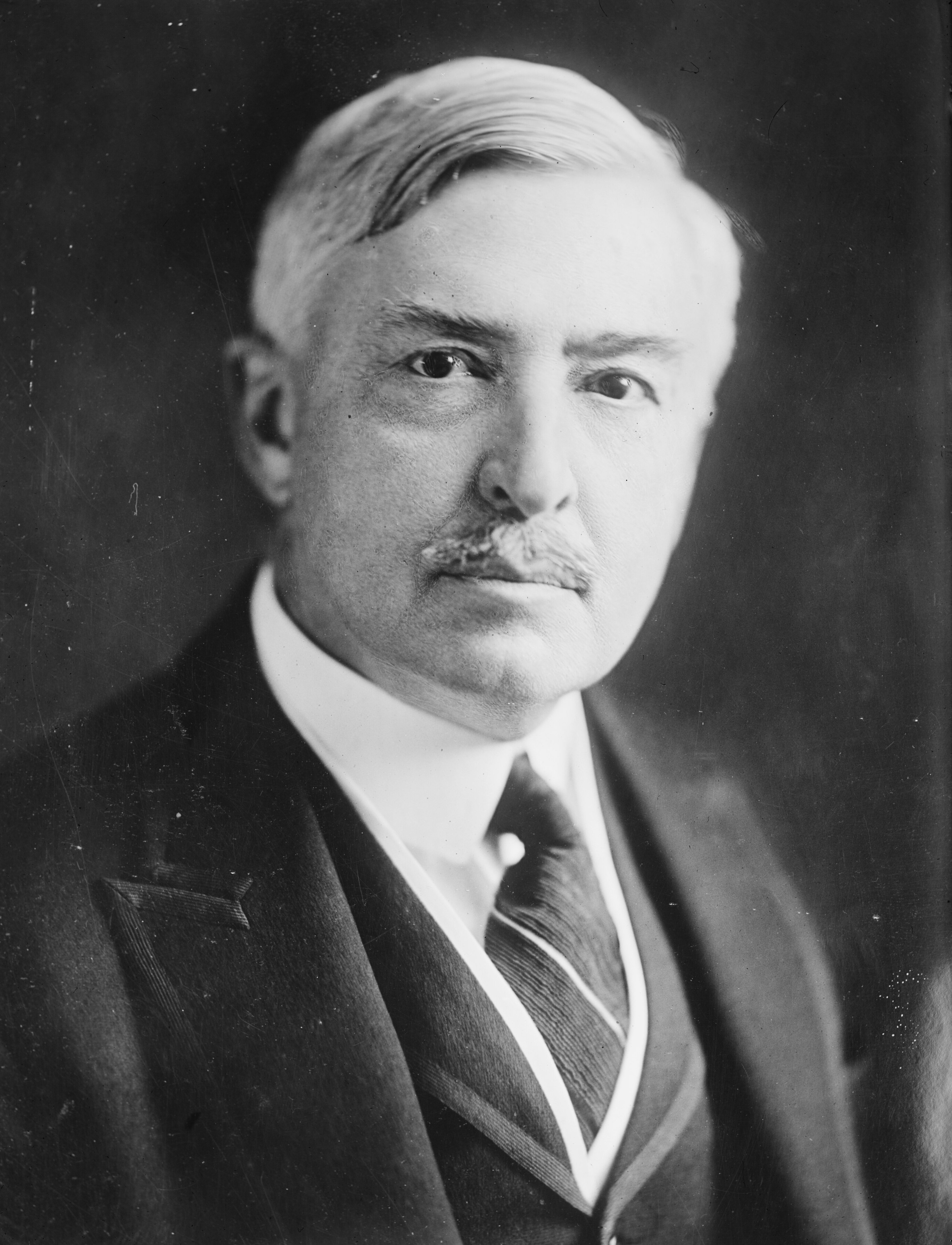
Nominee	Marcus A. Coolidge	William M. Butler
Party	Democratic	Republican
Popular vote	651,939	539,226
Percentage	54.01%	44.67%
- Coolidge: 40–50% 50–60% 60–70% 70–80% Butler: 40–50% 50–60% 60–70% 70–80% 80–90% 90–100%
Senator before election
Frederick H. Gillett
Republican
Elected Senator
Marcus A. Coolidge
Democratic

General election
Party	Candidate	Votes	%	±%
Democratic	Marcus A. Coolidge	651,939	54.01	▲5.40
Republican	William M. Butler	539,226	44.67	▼5.59
Socialist	Sylvester J. McBride	7,244	0.60	N/A
Socialist Labor	Oscar Kinsalas	4,640	0.38	N/A
Communist	Max Lerner	3,962	0.34	▼0.80

== Michigan ==
1930 United States Senate election in Michigan
- November 4, 1930
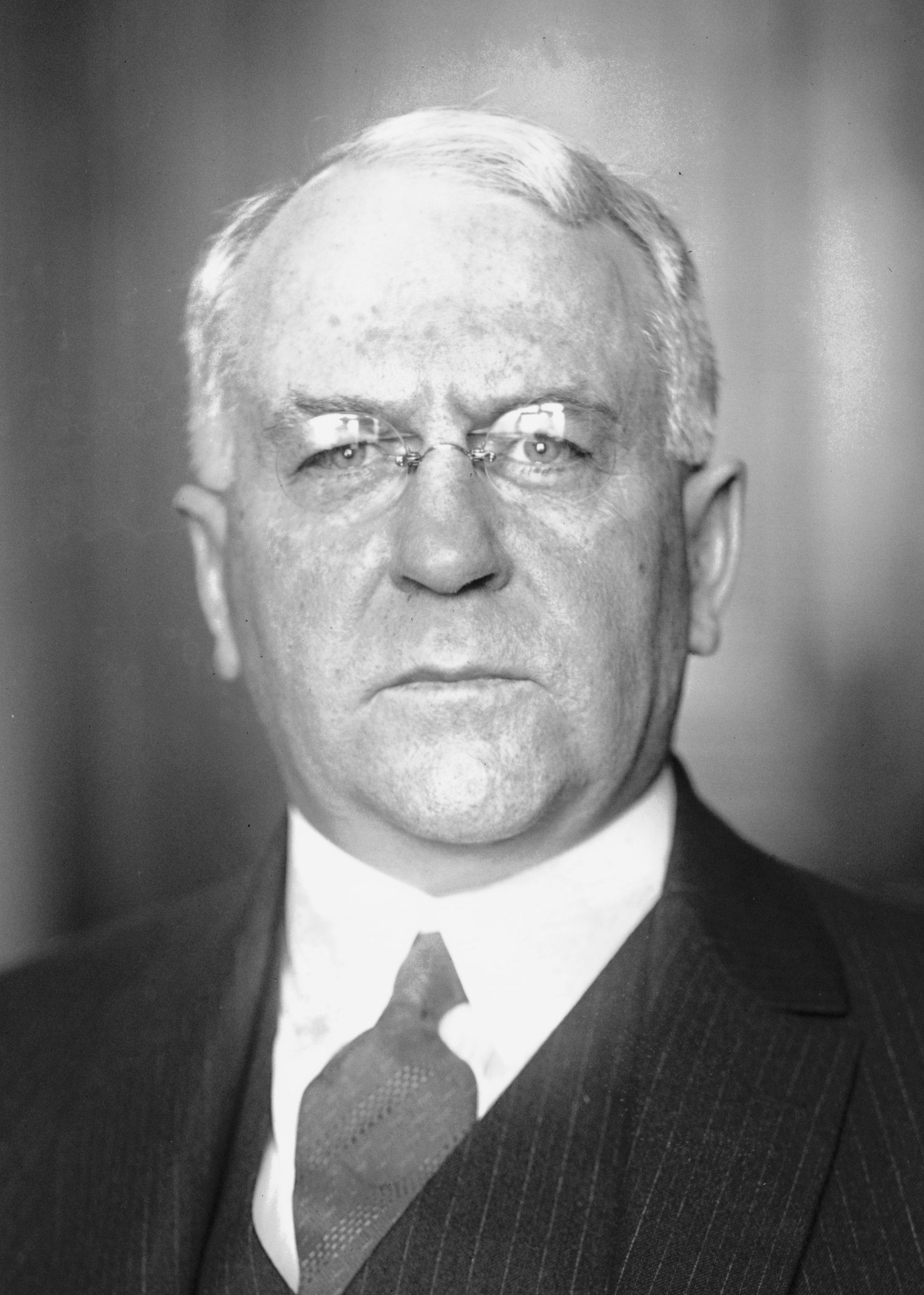

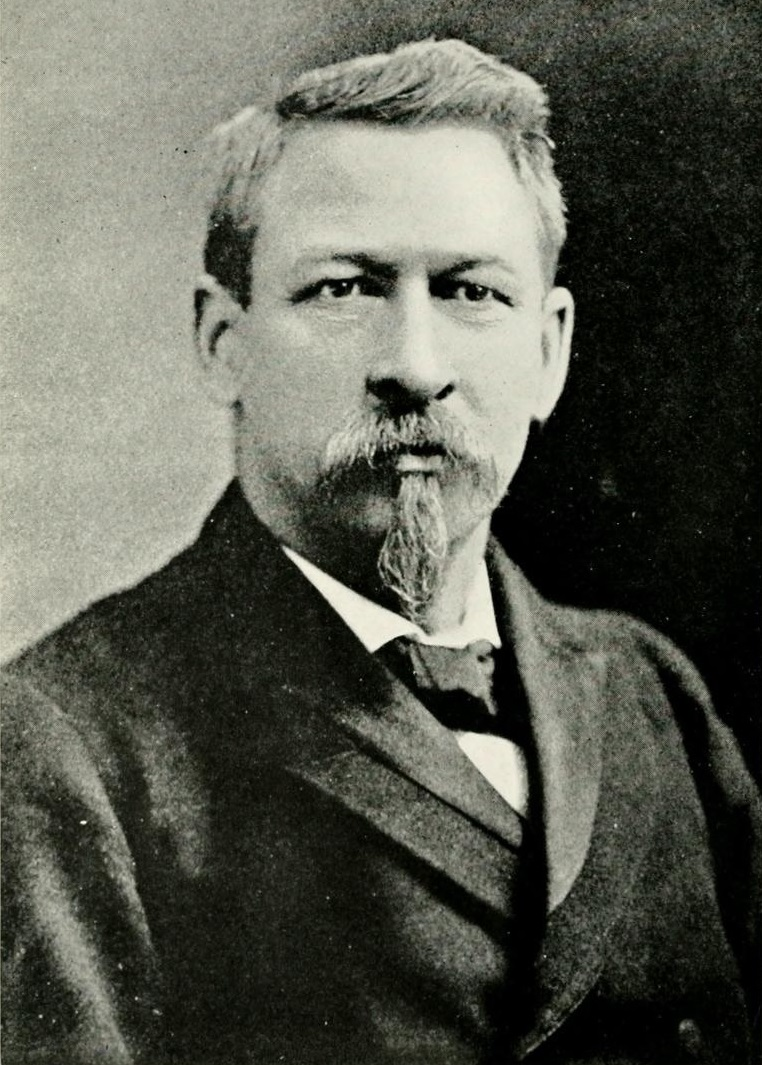
Nominee	James J. Couzens	Thomas Weadock
Party	Republican	Democratic
Popular vote	634,577	169,757
Percentage	78.15%	20.91%
- County results Couzens: 50–60% 60–70% 70–80% 80–90% 90–100%
U.S. senator before election
James J. Couzens
Republican
Elected U.S. Senator
James J. Couzens
Republican

1930 United States Senate election in Michigan
Party	Candidate	Votes	%
Republican	James J. Couzens (Incumbent)	634,577	78.15
Democratic	Thomas A. E. Weadock	169,757	20.91
Workers	George Powers	3,523	0.43
Socialist	Milton E. Depew	2,419	0.30
Prohibition	Charles Rennells	1,718	0.21
None	All Others	13	0.00
Majority		464,820	57.24
Turnout		812,007	
Republican hold			

== Minnesota ==
1930 United States Senate election in Minnesota
- November 4, 1930
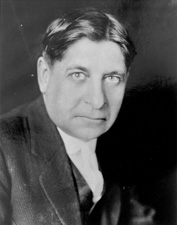

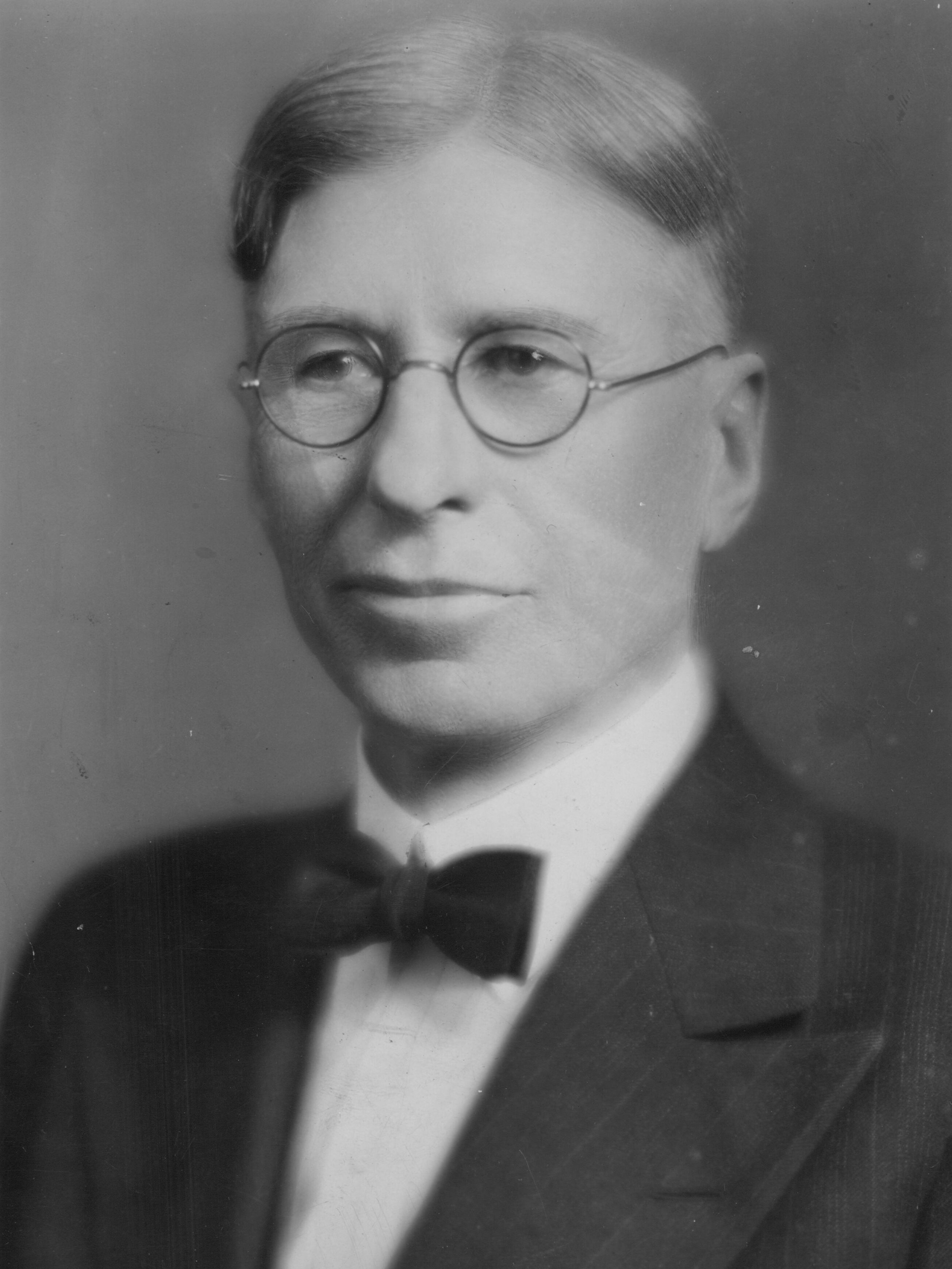

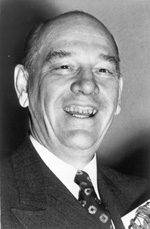
Nominee	Thomas D. Schall	Einar Hoidale	Ernest Lundeen
Party	Republican	Democratic	Farmer–Labor
Popular vote	293,626	282,018	178,671
Percentage	37.61%	36.13%	22.89%
- County results Schall: 30–40% 40–50% 50–60% 60–70% Hoidale: 30–40% 40–50% 50–60% Lundeen: 30–40% 40–50% 50–60%
U.S. senator before election
Thomas D. Schall
Republican
Elected U.S. Senator
Thomas D. Schall
Republican

1930 United States Senate election in Minnesota
Party	Candidate	Votes	%
Republican	Thomas D. Schall (Incumbent)	293,626	37.61
Democratic	Einar Hoidale	282,018	36.13
Farmer–Labor	Ernest Lundeen	178,671	22.89
Independent	Charles A. Lund	20,669	2.65
Communist	Rudolph Harju	5,645	0.72
Majority		11,608	1.48
Turnout		780,629	
Republican hold			

== Mississippi ==
1930 United States Senate election in Mississippi
Party	Candidate	Votes	%
Democratic	Pat Harrison (Incumbent)	33,953	100.00
Democratic hold			

== Montana ==
1930 United States Senate election in Montana
- November 4, 1930
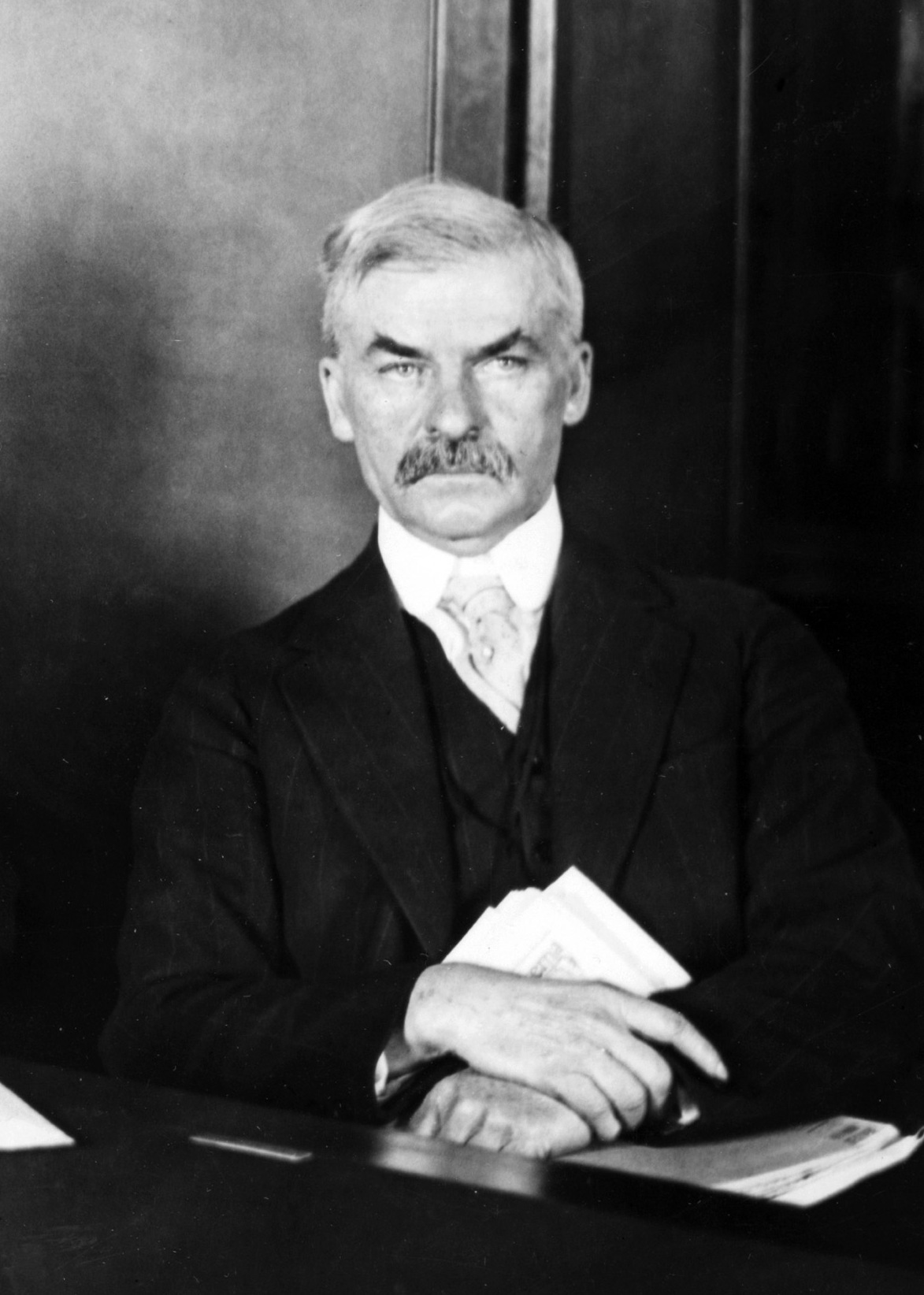

Nominee	Thomas J. Walsh	Albert J. Galen
Party	Democratic	Republican
Popular vote	106,274	66,724
Percentage	60.33%	37.88%
- County Results; Walsh: 30–40% 40–50% 50–60% 60–70% 70–80% Galen: 50–60%
U.S. senator before election
Thomas J. Walsh
Democratic
Elected U.S. Senator
Thomas J. Walsh
Democratic

1930 United States Senate election in Montana
Party	Candidate	Votes	%	±%
Democratic	Thomas J. Walsh (Incumbent)	106,274	60.33	+7.52%
Republican	Albert J. Galen	66,724	37.88	−4.52%
Farmer–Labor	Charles E. Taylor	1,789	1.02	−3.32%
Socialist	John F. McKay	1,006	0.57	+0.26%
Communist	Willis L. Wright	368	0.21	
Majority		39,550	22.45	+12.04%
Turnout		176,161		
Democratic hold		Swing		

== Nebraska ==
1930 United States Senate election in Nebraska
- November 4, 1930
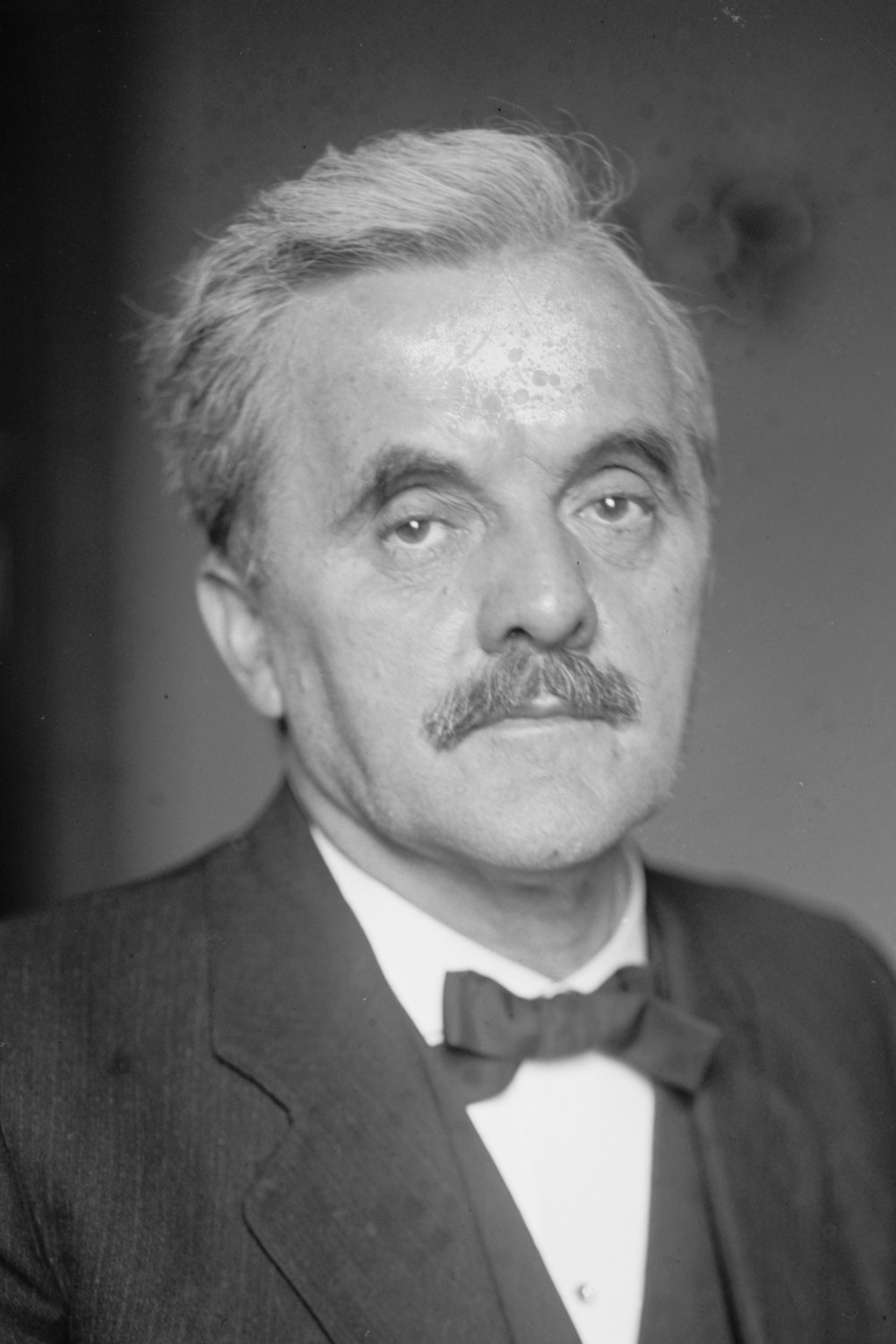

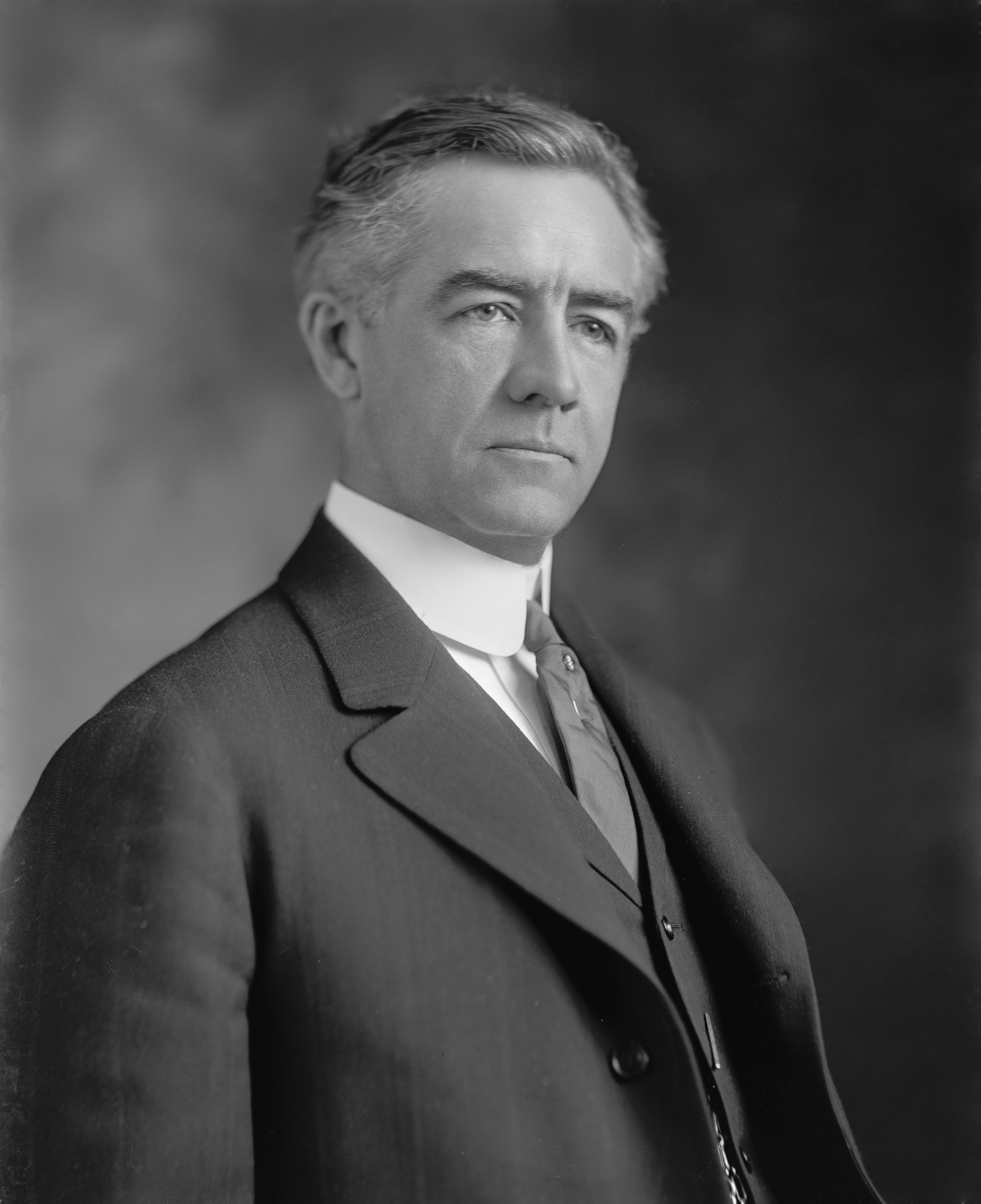
Nominee	George W. Norris	Gilbert Hitchcock
Party	Republican	Democratic
Popular vote	247,118	172,795
Percentage	56.84%	39.74%
- County results Norris: 40–50% 50–60% 60–70% 70–80% Hitchcock: 50–60%
U.S. senator before election
George W. Norris
Republican
Elected U.S. Senator
George W. Norris
Republican

1930 United States Senate election in Nebraska
Party	Candidate	Votes	%
Republican	George W. Norris (Incumbent)	247,118	56.84
Democratic	Gilbert Hitchcock	172,795	39.74
By Petition	Beatrice Fenton Craig	14,884	3.42
N/A	Scattering	7	<0.01
Majority		74,323	17.10
Turnout		434,804	
Republican hold			

== New Hampshire ==
1930 United States Senate election in New Hampshire
- November 4, 1930
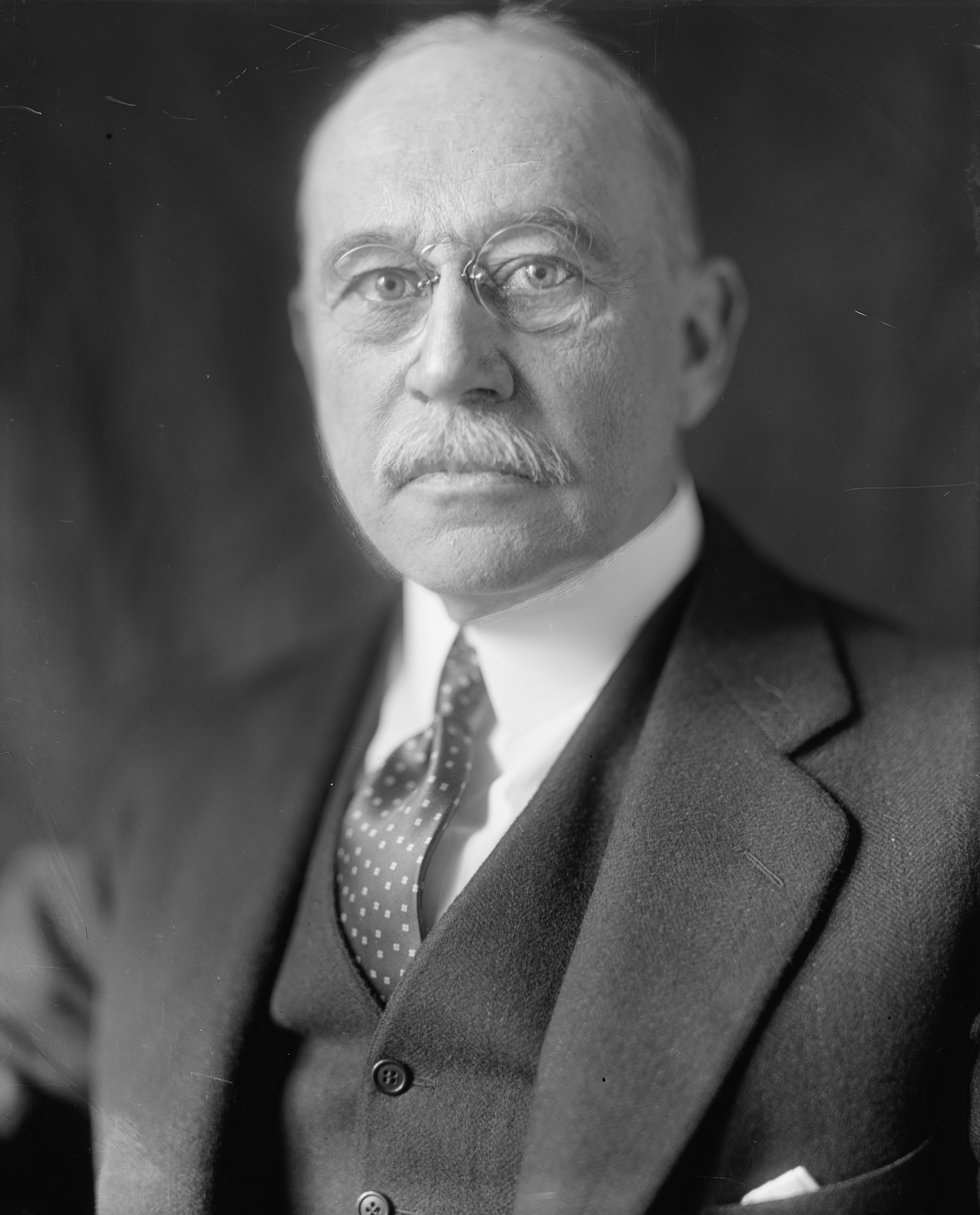
Nominee	Henry W. Keyes	Albert W. Noone
Party	Republican	Democratic
Popular vote	72,225	52,284
Percentage	57.88%	41.90%
- Keyes: 50–60% 60–70% 70–80% 80–90% 90-100% Noone: 50–60% 60–70% 70–80% Tie: 50%
Senator before election
Henry W. Keyes
Republican
Elected Senator
Henry W. Keyes
Republican

1930 United States Senate election in New Hampshire
Party	Candidate	Votes	%
Republican	Henry W. Keyes (Incumbent)	72,225	57.88
Democratic	Albert W. Noone	52,284	41.90
Communist	Henry C. Iram	282	0.23
Majority		19,941	15.98
Turnout		124,791	
Republican hold			

== New Jersey ==
=== New Jersey (regular) ===
1930 United States Senate election in New Jersey
- November 4, 1930
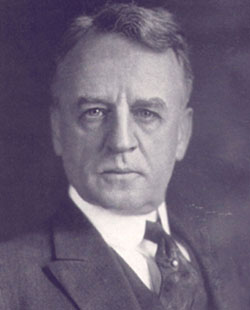

Nominee	Dwight Morrow	Alexander Simpson
Party	Republican	Democratic
Popular vote	601,497	401,007
Percentage	58.50%	39.00%
- County results Morrow: 50–60% 60–70% 70–80% Simpson: 50–60% 60–70%
Senator before election
David Baird Jr.
Republican
Elected Senator
Dwight Morrow
Republican

New Jersey regular election
Party	Candidate	Votes	%
Republican	Dwight Morrow	601,497	58.50
Democratic	Alexander Simpson	401,007	39.00
Prohibition	Esther Hill Elfeth	18,903	1.84
Socialist	Henry Jager	4,519	0.44
Communist	Dozier W. Graham	1,627	0.16
Socialist Labor	Alexander Kudlik	670	0.07
Majority		200,490	19.50
Turnout		1,028,223	
Republican hold			

=== New Jersey (special) ===
1930 United States Senate special election in New Jersey
- November 4, 1930
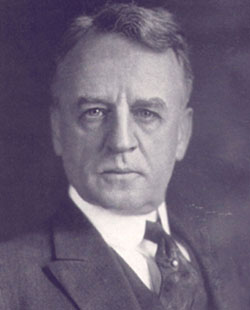

Nominee	Dwight Morrow	Thelma Parkinson
Party	Republican	Democratic
Popular vote	571,006	372,739
Percentage	59.14%	38.60%
- County results Morrow: 50–60% 60–70% 70–80% Simpson: 50–60% 60–70%
Senator before election
David Baird Jr.
Republican
Elected Senator
Dwight Morrow
Republican

New Jersey special election
Party	Candidate	Votes	%
Republican	Dwight Morrow	571,006	59.14
Democratic	Thelma Parkinson	372,739	38.60
Prohibition	James G. Mason	15,512	1.61
Socialist	Henry Jager	4,615	0.48
Communist	Dozier W. Graham	1,700	0.18
Majority		198,267	20.54
Turnout		965,572	
Republican hold			

== New Mexico ==
1930 United States Senate election in New Mexico
- November 4, 1930
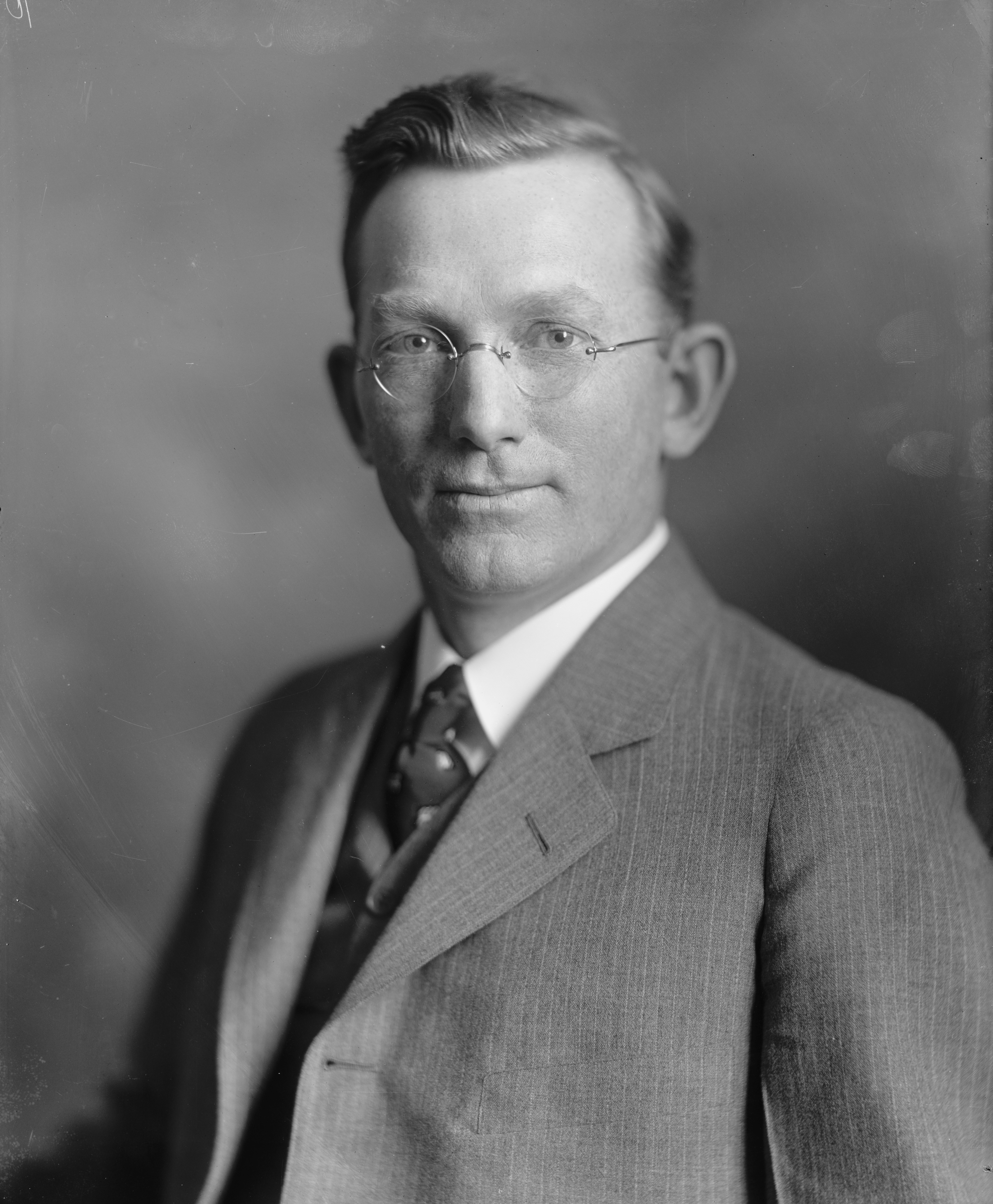
Nominee	Sam G. Bratton	Ernest W. Everly
Party	Democratic	Republican
Popular vote	69,362	48,699
Percentage	58.62%	41.16%
- County results Bratton: 50–60% 60–70% 70–80% 80–90% Everly: 50–60%
U.S. senator before election
Sam G. Bratton
Democratic
Elected U.S. Senator
Sam G. Bratton
Democratic

1930 United States Senate election in New Mexico
Party	Candidate	Votes	%
Democratic	Sam G. Bratton (incumbent)	69,362	58.62
Republican	Herbert B. Holt	48,699	41.16
Socialist	R. B. Cochran	256	0.22
Majority		20,663	17.46
Turnout		118,317	
Democratic hold			

== North Carolina ==
1930 United States Senate election in North Carolina
- November 4, 1930
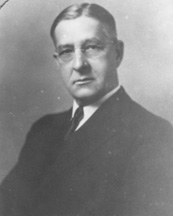

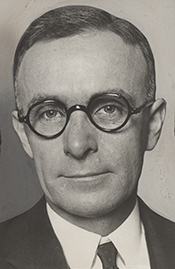
Nominee	Josiah Bailey	George M. Pritchard
Party	Democratic	Republican
Popular vote	324,393	210,761
Percentage	60.61%	39.38%
- County results Bailey: 50–60% 60–70% 70–80% 80–90% 90–100% Pritchard: 50–60% 60–70% 80–90%
Senator before election
Josiah Bailey
Democratic
Elected Senator
Josiah Bailey
Democratic

1930 United States Senate election in North Carolina
Party	Candidate	Votes	%
Democratic	Josiah Bailey	324,393	60.61
Republican	George M. Pritchard	210,761	39.38
Independent	F. M. Simmons (Incumbent)	26	0.00
Majority		113,632	21.23
Turnout		535,180	
Democratic hold			

== Ohio (special) ==
1930 United States Senate special election in Ohio
- November 4, 1930
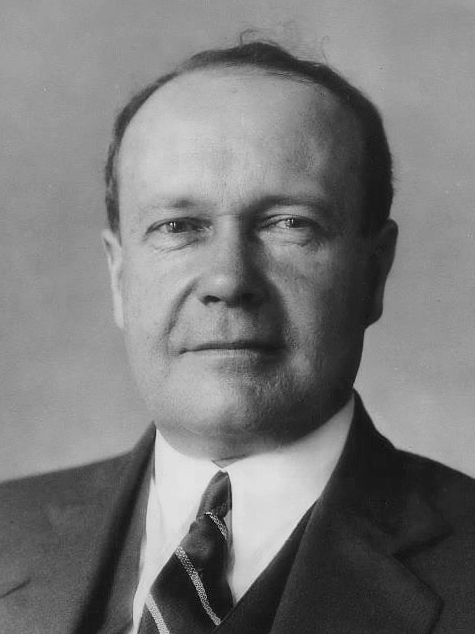

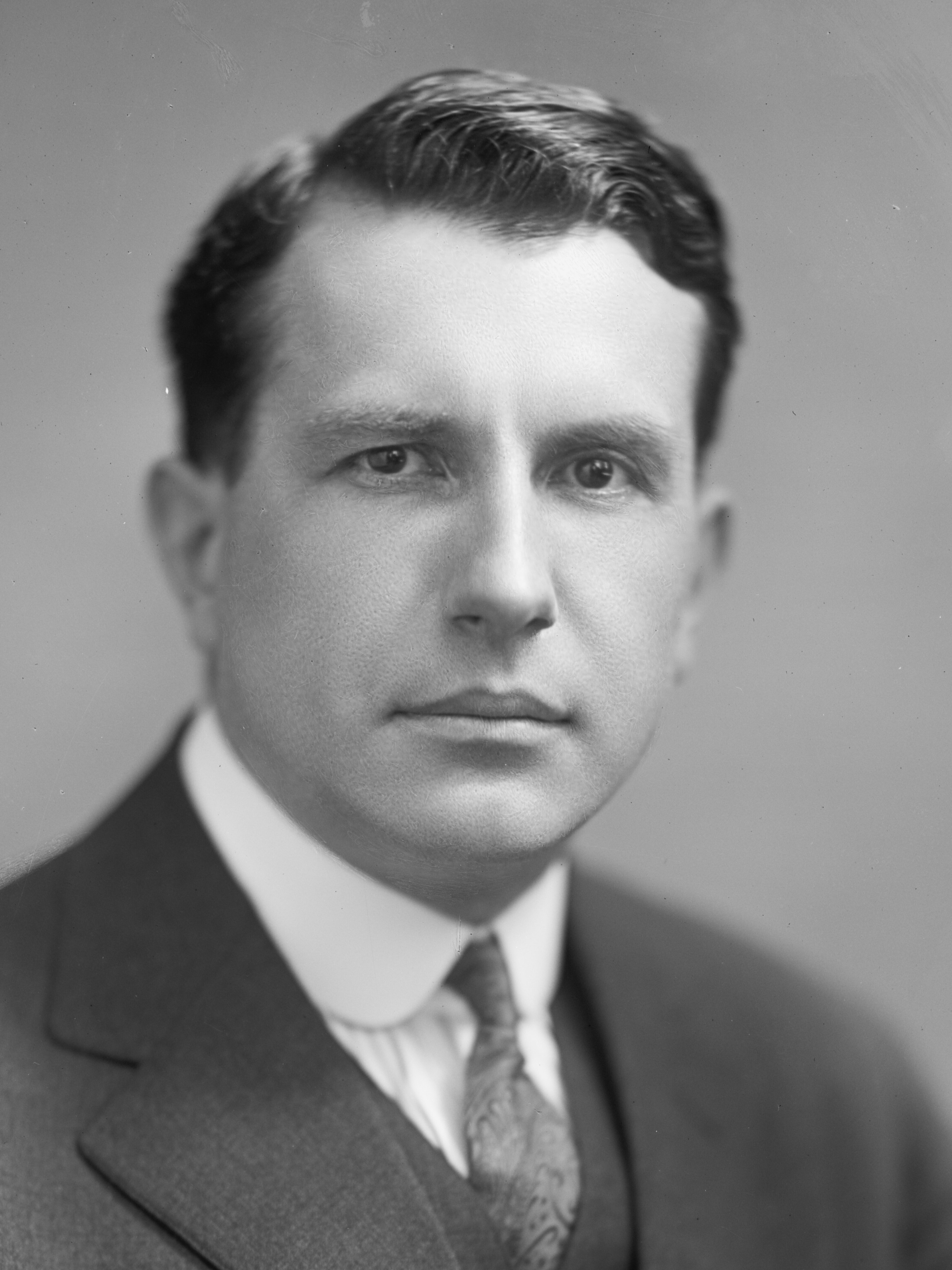
Nominee	Robert J. Bulkley	Roscoe C. McCulloch
Party	Democratic	Republican
Popular vote	1,046,561	863,944
Percentage	54.78%	45.22%
- County results Bulkley: 50–60% 60–70% 70–80% McCulloch: 50–60% 60–70% 70–80%
United States Senator before election
Roscoe C. McCulloch
Republican
Elected United States Senator
Robert J. Bulkley
Democratic

1930 United States Senate special election in Ohio
Party	Candidate	Votes	%
Democratic	Robert J. Bulkley	1,046,561	54.78
Republican	Roscoe C. McCulloch (Incumbent)	863,944	45.22
Majority		182,617	9.56
Turnout		1,910,505	
Democratic gain from Republican			

== Oklahoma ==
1930 United States Senate election in Oklahoma
- November 4, 1930
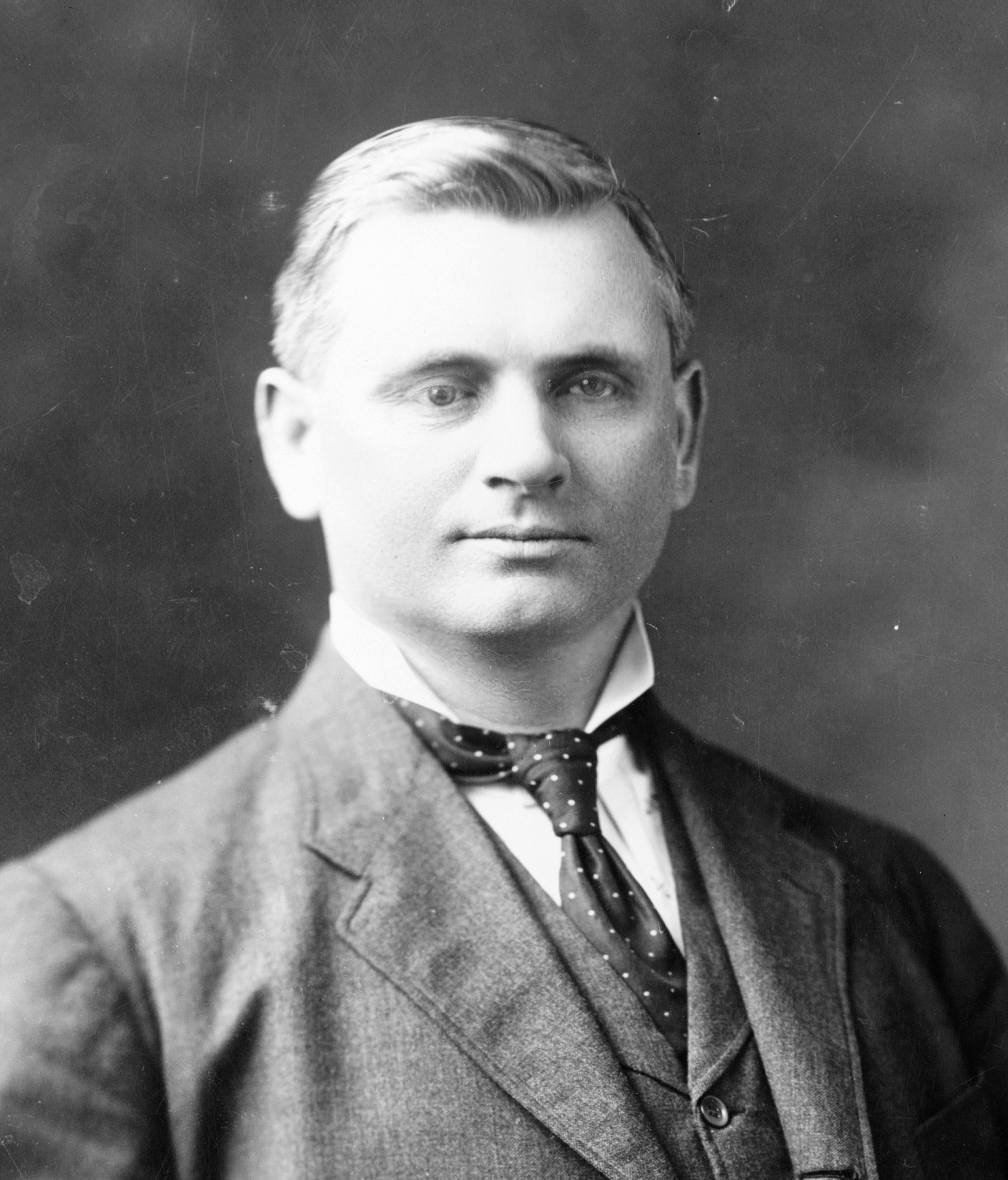

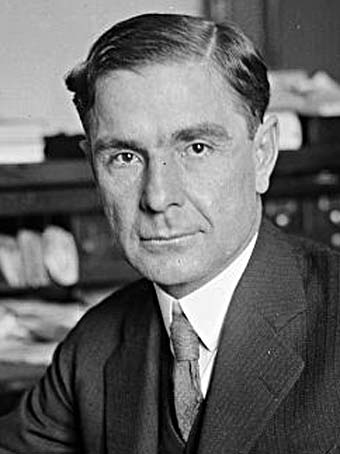
Nominee	Thomas Gore	William B. Pine
Party	Democratic	Republican
Popular vote	255,838	232,589
Percentage	52.29%	47.54%
- County results Gore: 50–60% 60–70% 70–80% 80–90% Pine: 50–60% 60–70%
U.S. senator before election
William B. Pine
Republican
Elected U.S. Senator
Thomas Gore
Democratic

1930 United States Senate election in Oklahoma
Party	Candidate	Votes	%
Democratic	Thomas Gore	255,838	52.29
Republican	William B. Pine (Incumbent)	232,589	47.54
Independent	Edward D. Evans	614	0.13
Independent	Thomas P. Hopley	218	0.04
Majority		23,249	4.75
Turnout		489,259	
Democratic gain from Republican			

== Oregon ==
1930 United States Senate election in Oregon
- November 4, 1930
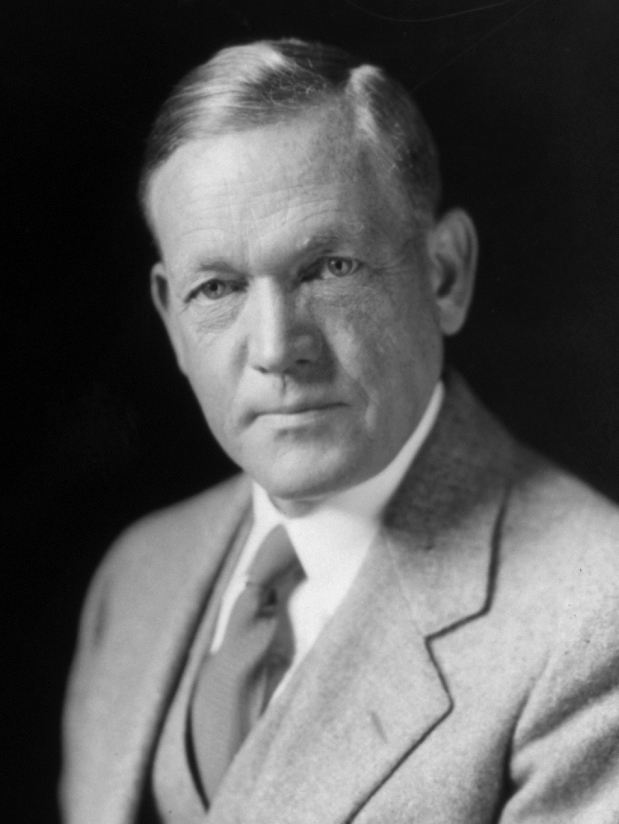

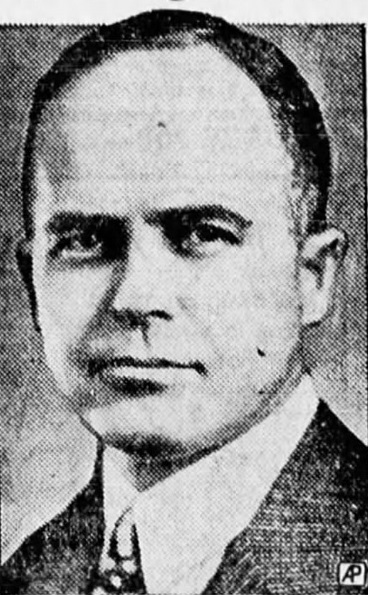

Nominee	Charles L. McNary	Elton Watkins	Llewellyn A. Banks
Party	Republican	Democratic	Independent
Popular vote	137,231	66,028	17,488
Percentage	58.06%	27.93%	7.40%
- County results McNary: 40–50% 50–60% 60–70% 70–80%
Senator before election
Charles L. McNary
Republican
Elected Senator
Charles L. McNary
Republican

1930 United States Senate election in Oregon
Party	Candidate	Votes	%
Republican	Charles L. McNary (Incumbent)	137,231	58.06
Democratic	Elton Watkins	66,028	27.93
Independent	Llewellyn A. Banks	17,488	7.40
Independent	H. H. Stallard	10,573	4.47
Independent Socialist Labor	O. D. Teel	5,051	2.14
None	All Others	5	0.00
Majority		71,203	30.13
Turnout		236,376	
Republican hold			

== Pennsylvania (special) ==
1930 United States Senate special election in Pennsylvania
- November 4, 1930
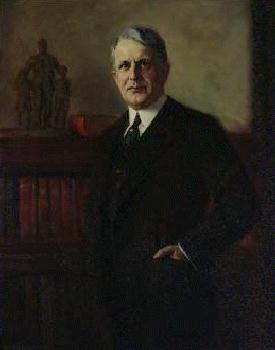

Nominee	James J. Davis	Sedgwick Kistler
Party	Republican	Democratic
Popular vote	1,462,186	523,338
Percentage	71.54%	25.61%
- County results Davis: 30–40% 50–60% 60–70% 70–80% 80–90% Kistler: 40–50% 50–60%
U.S. senator before election
Joseph R. Grundy
Republican
Elected U.S. Senator
James J. Davis
Republican

1930 United States Senate special election in Pennsylvania
Party	Candidate	Votes	%	±%
Republican	James J. Davis	1,462,186	71.54	
Democratic	Sedgwick Kistler	523,338	25.61	
Socialist	William J. Van Essen	26,796	1.31	
Prohibition	S. W. Bierer	24,498	1.20	
Communist	Emmett Patrick Cush	6,960	0.34	
Majority		938,848	45.93	
Turnout		2,043,820		
Republican hold		Swing		

== Rhode Island ==
1930 United States Senate election in Rhode Island
Party	Candidate	Votes	%
Republican	Jesse H. Metcalf (Incumbent)	112,202	50.30
Democratic	Peter G. Gerry	109,687	49.17
Socialist Labor	Charles F. Bishop	1,195	0.54
Majority		2,515	1.13
Turnout		223,084	
Republican hold			

Incumbent Republican Senator Jesse H. Metcalf successfully sought reelection to a 2nd term in office. As of 2023, this is the last time a Republican has won the Class 2 Senate seat in Rhode Island, and it would be the last time a Republican would win any Senate seat in the state at all until John Chafee in 1976.

== South Carolina ==
1930 Democratic Senate primary runoff in South Carolina
- September 9, 1930
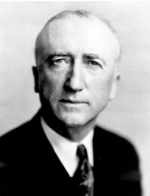

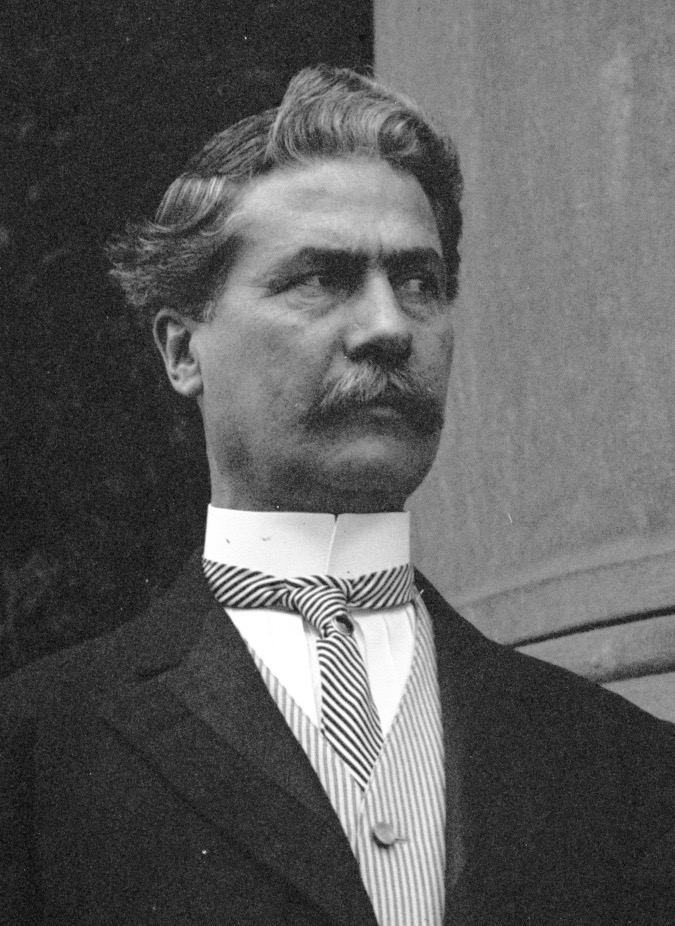
Nominee	James F. Byrnes	Cole Blease
Party	Democratic	Democratic
Popular vote	120,755	116,264
Percentage	50.95%	49.05%
- County results Byrnes: 50–60% 60–70% 70–80% Blease: 50–60% 60–70%
U.S. senator before election
Coleman Livingston Blease
Democratic
Elected U.S. Senator
James F. Byrnes
Democratic

South Carolina U.S. Senate Election, 1930
Party	Candidate	Votes	%	±%
Democratic	James F. Byrnes	16,211	100.0	0.0
Majority		16,211	100.0	0.0
Turnout		16,211		
Democratic hold		Swing		

== South Dakota ==
1930 United States Senate election in South Dakota
- November 4, 1930
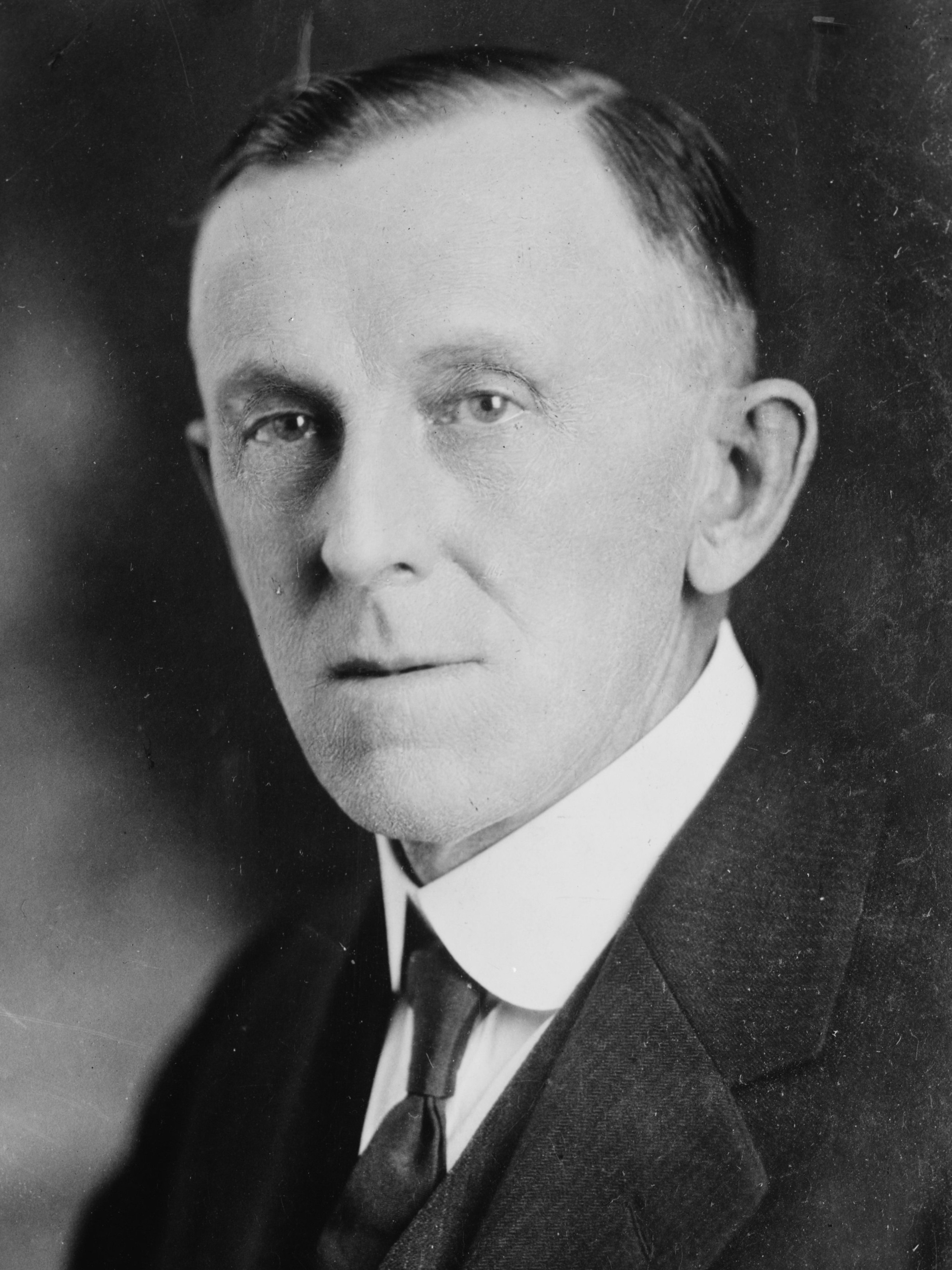

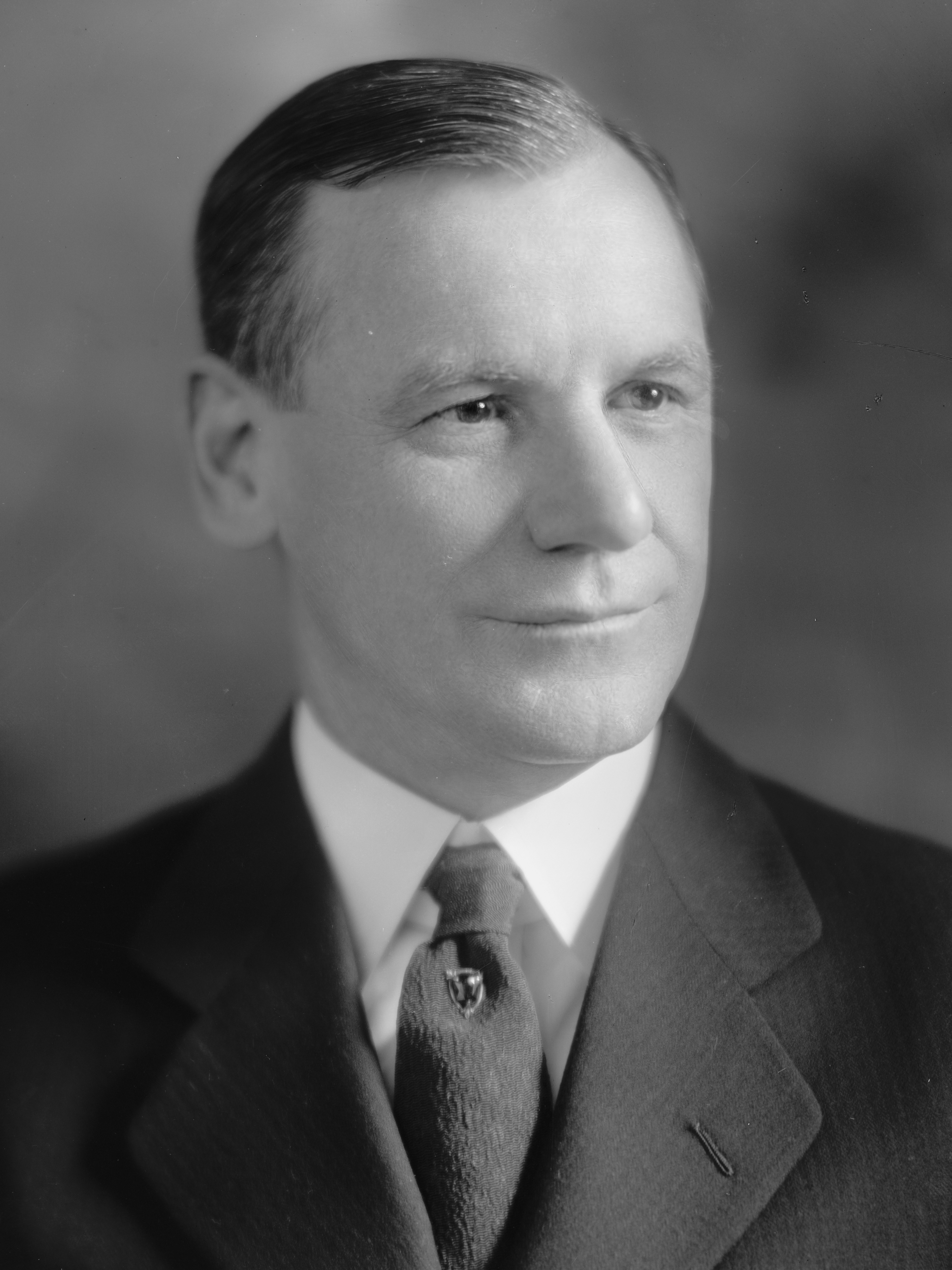
Nominee	William J. Bulow	William H. McMaster
Party	Democratic	Republican
Popular vote	106,317	99,595
Percentage	51.63%	48.37%
- County results Bulow: 50–60% 60–70% >90% McMaster: 50–60% 60–70% 70–80%
U.S. senator before election
William H. McMaster
Republican
Elected U.S. Senator
William J. Bulow
Democratic

1930 United States Senate election in South Dakota
Party	Candidate	Votes	%
Democratic	William J. Bulow	106,317	51.63
Republican	William H. McMaster (Incumbent)	99,595	48.37
Majority		6,722	3.26
Turnout		205,912	
Democratic gain from Republican			

== Tennessee ==
One-term Democrat Lawrence D. Tyson died August 24, 1929, and Democrat William E. Brock was appointed September 2, 1929, to continue the term, pending a special election.

=== Tennessee (special) ===
1930 United States Senate special election in Tennessee
- November 4, 1930
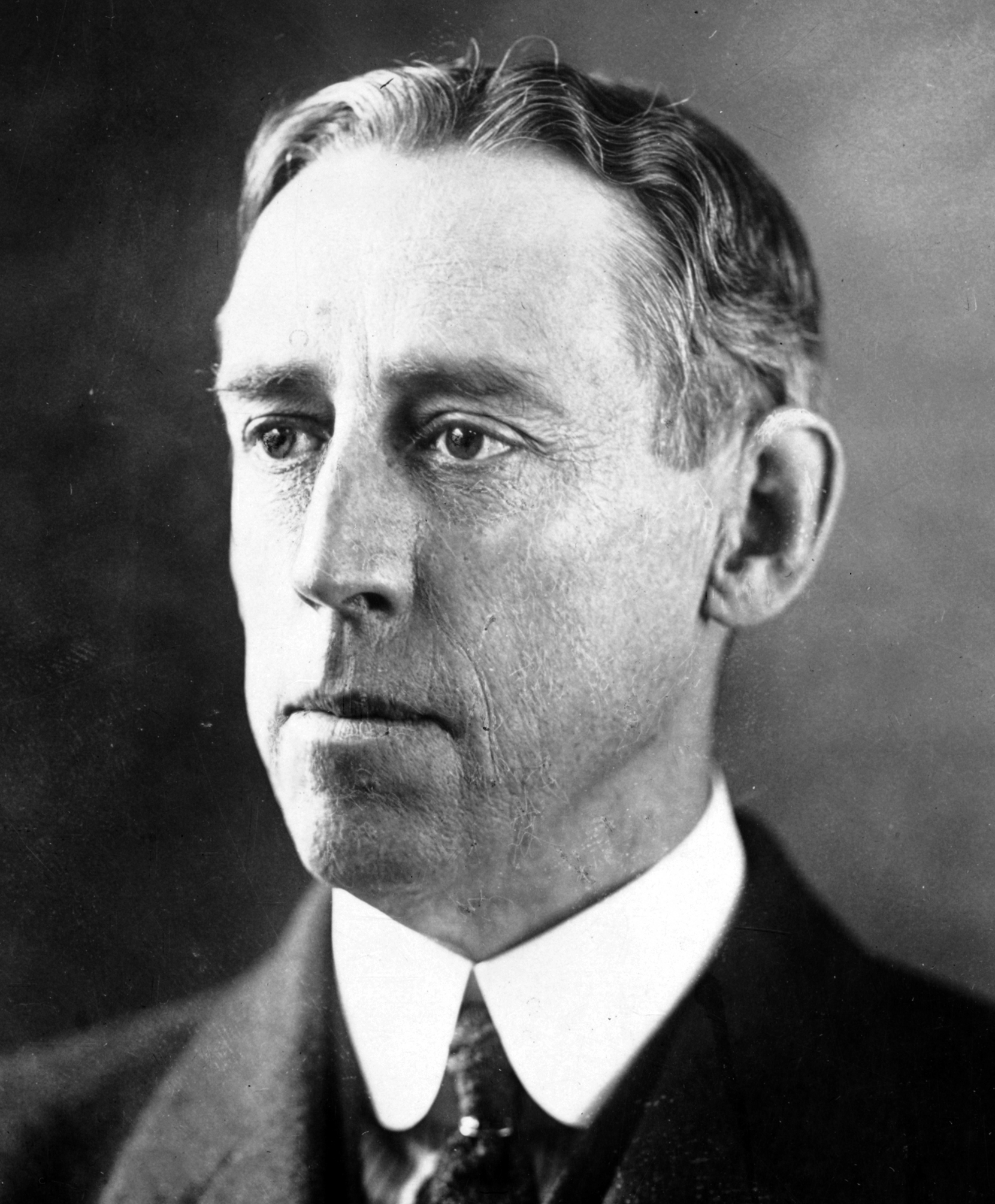

Nominee	William E. Brock	F. Todd Meacham
Party	Democratic	Republican
Popular vote	144,019	49,554
Percentage	74.40%	25.60%
- Results by county Brock: 50–60% 60–70% 70–80% 80–90% >90% Meacham: 50–60%
Senator before election
William E. Brock
Democratic
Elected Senator
William E. Brock
Democratic

Interim Democrat William E. Brock easily won election to finish the term.

Tennessee special Democratic primary (August 7, 1930)
Party	Candidate	Votes	%
Democratic	William E. Brock (incumbent)	113,492	70.67
Democratic	John Randolph Neal Jr.	47,110	29.33
Majority		66,382	41.33
Turnout			6.14
Democratic hold			

Tennessee special election
Party	Candidate	Votes	%
Democratic	William E. Brock (incumbent)	144,019	74.40
Republican	F. Todd Meacham	49,554	25.60
Majority		94,465	48.80
Turnout		193,573	
Democratic hold			

=== Tennessee (regular) ===
1930 United States Senate election in Tennessee
- November 4, 1930
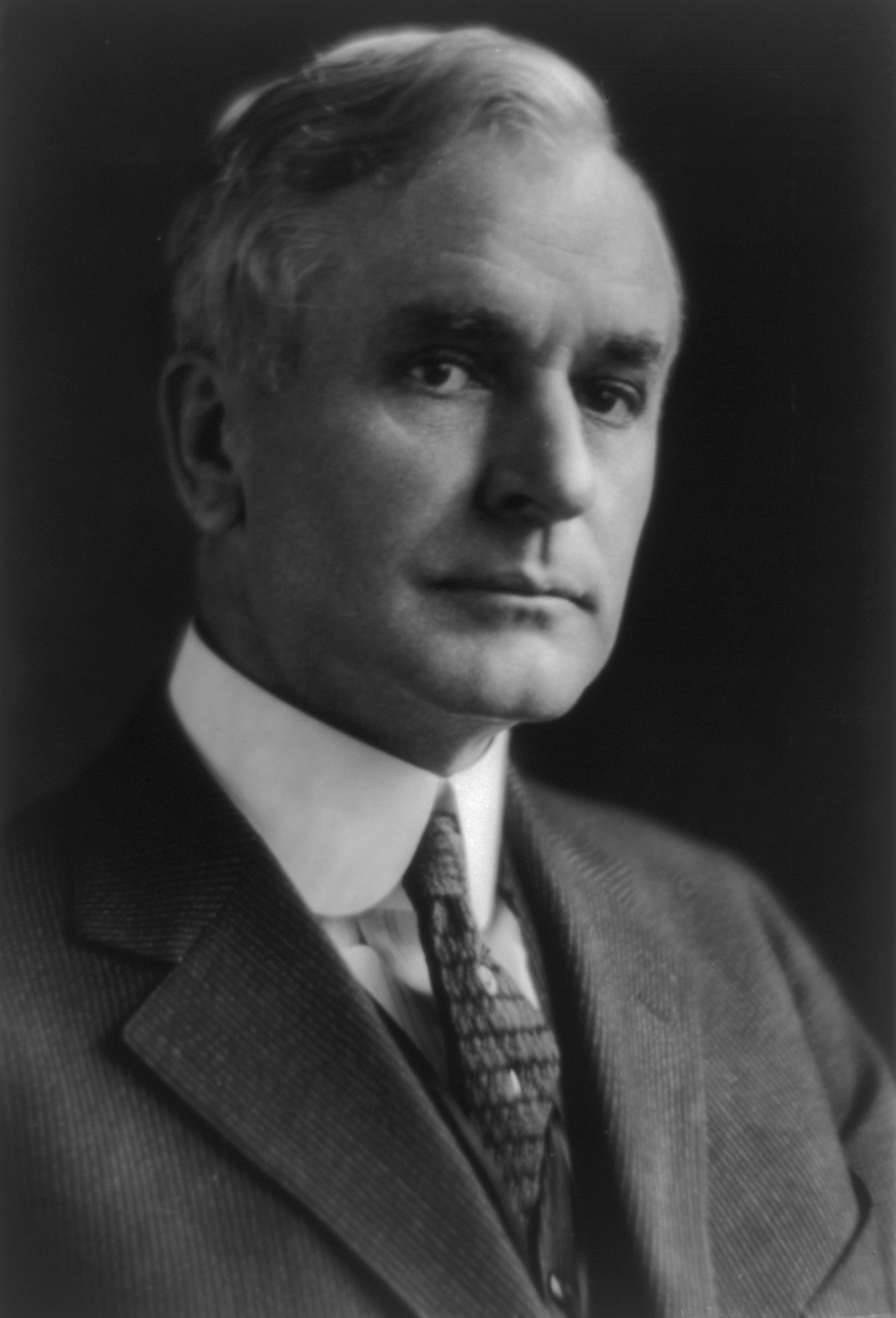

Nominee	Cordell Hull	Paul E. Divine
Party	Democratic	Republican
Popular vote	154,131	58,650
Percentage	71.30%	27.13%
- Results by county Hull: 40–50% 50–60% 60–70% 70–80% 80–90% >90% Divine: 50–60% 60–70% 70–80% 80–90%
Senator before election
William E. Brock
Democratic
Elected Senator
Cordell Hull
Democratic

William E. Brock was not a candidate to the next term, instead choosing to return to his Chattanooga candy manufacturing business. Instead, former Democratic congressman Cordell Hull was swept into the seat.

Tennessee regular election
Party	Candidate	Votes	%
Democratic	Cordell Hull	154,131	71.30
Republican	Paul E. Divine	58,650	27.13
Communist	Sherman Bell	3,392	1.57
Majority		95,481	44.17
Turnout		216,173	
Democratic hold			

Hull was appointed United States Secretary of State and served there for 11 years, and in 1945, he was awarded the Nobel Peace Prize for "co-initiating the United Nations."

== Texas ==
1930 United States Senate election in Texas
- November 4, 1930
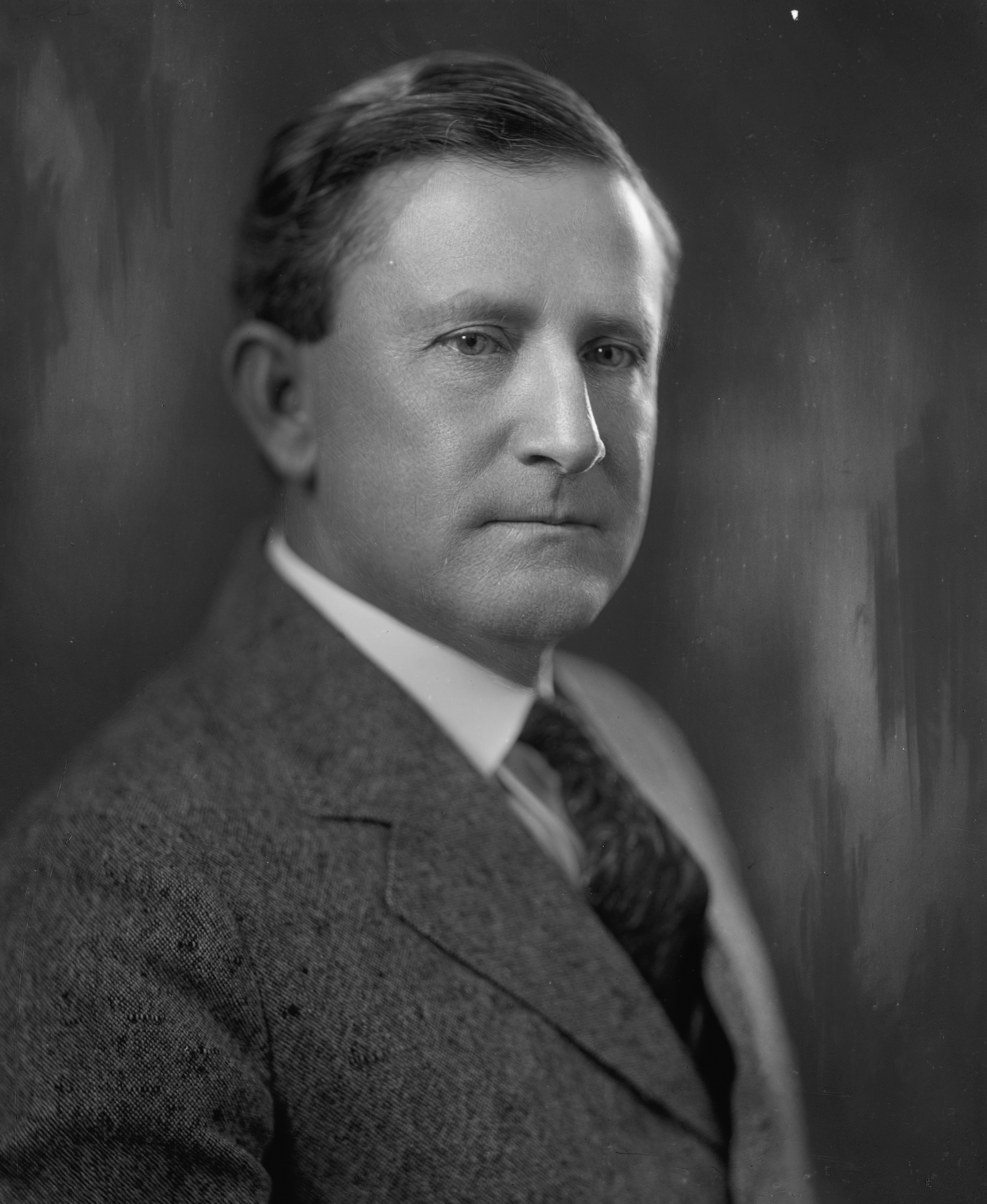

Nominee	Morris Sheppard	Doran Haesly
Party	Democratic	Republican
Popular vote	266,550	39,047
Percentage	86.91%	12.73%
- County Results Sheppard: 40–50% 50–60% 60–70% 70–80% 80–90% >90% Haesly: 50–60% 60–70% No vote
U.S. senator before election
Morris Sheppard
Democratic
Elected U.S. Senator
Morris Sheppard
Democratic

1930 United States Senate election in Texas
Party	Candidate	Votes	%
Democratic	Morris Sheppard (Incumbent)	266,550	86.91
Republican	D. J. Haesly	39,047	12.73
Socialist	Guy L. Smith	808	0.26
Communist	W. A. Berry	296	0.10
Majority		227,503	74.19
Turnout		306,701	
Democratic hold			

== Virginia ==
1930 United States Senate Election in Virginia
- November 4, 1930
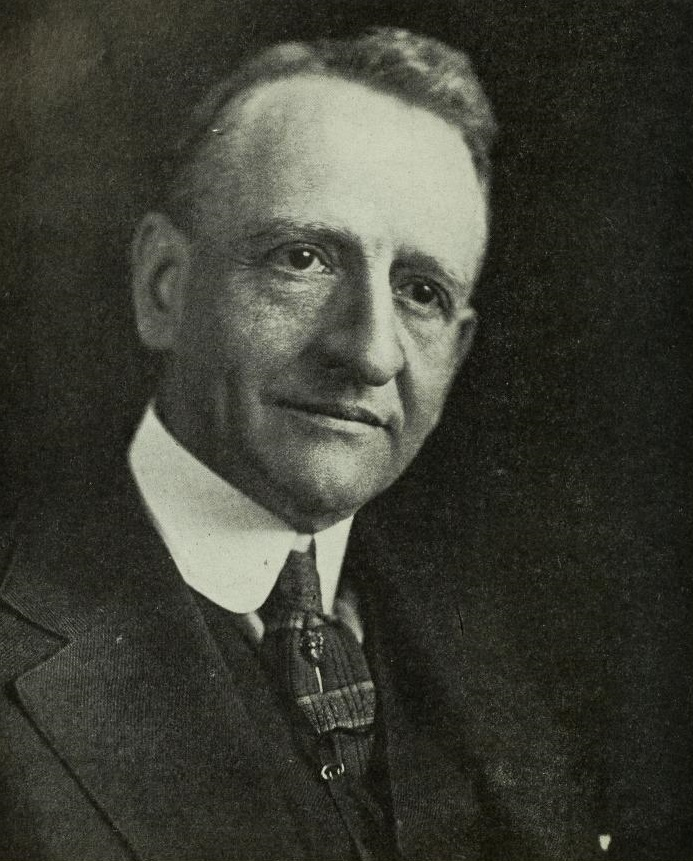

Nominee	Carter Glass	J. Cloyd Byars	Joe C. Morgan
Party	Democratic	Independent Democrat	Socialist
Popular vote	112,002	26,091	7,944
Percentage	76.67%	17.86%	5.44%
- County and independent city results Glass: 50–60% 60–70% 70–80% 80–90% 90–100%
U.S. senator before election
Carter Glass
Democratic
Elected U.S. Senator
Carter Glass
Democratic

1930 United States Senate election in Virginia
Party	Candidate	Votes	%	±%
Democratic	Carter Glass (Incumbent)	112,002	76.67	+3.55%
Independent Democratic	J. Cloyd Byars	26,091	17.86	+17.86%
Socialist	Joe C. Morgan	7,944	5.44	+5.44%
Write-ins		49	0.03	+0.03%
Majority		85,911	58.81	+9.87%
Turnout		146,086		
Democratic hold				

== West Virginia ==
1930 United States Senate election in West Virginia
- November 4, 1930
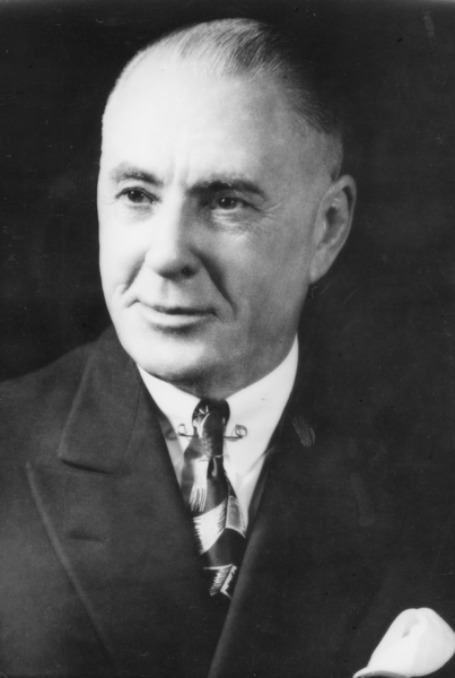
Nominee	Matthew M. Neely	James Elwood Jones
Party	Democratic	Republican
Popular vote	342,437	209,427
Percentage	61.91%	37.86%
- County results Neely: 40–50% 50–60% 60–70% 70–80% Jones: 60–70%
U.S. senator before election
Matthew M. Neely
Democratic
Elected U.S. Senator
Matthew M. Neely
Democratic

1930 United States Senate election in West Virginia
Party	Candidate	Votes	%
Democratic	Matthew M. Neely	342,437	61.91
Republican	James Elwood Jones	209,427	37.86
Prohibition	John Wesley MacDonald	1,293	0.23
Majority		133,010	24.05
Turnout		553,157	
Democratic gain from Republican			

== Wyoming ==
Six-term Republican Francis E. Warren had died November 24, 1929, and Republican Patrick J. Sullivan was appointed to continue the term, pending a special election in which he was not a candidate.

=== Wyoming (special) ===
1930 United States Senate special election in Wyoming
- November 4, 1930
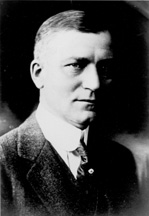

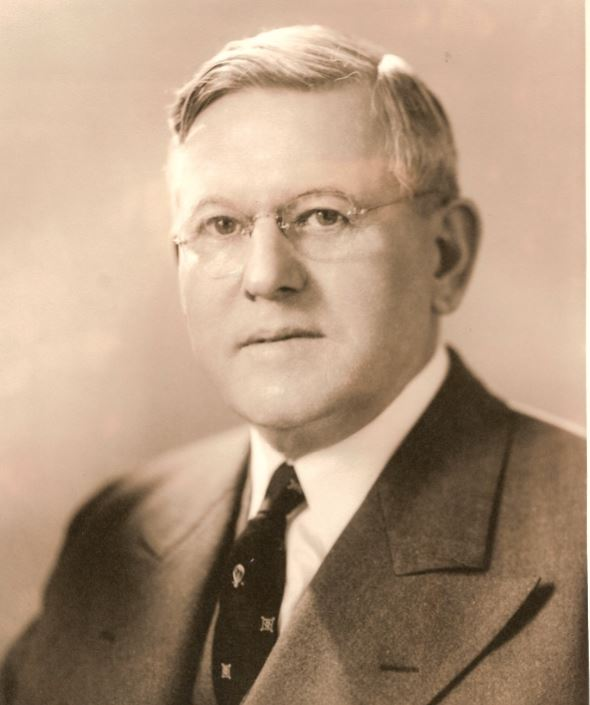
Nominee	Robert D. Carey	Harry Schwartz
Party	Republican	Democratic
Popular vote	42,726	29,904
Percentage	58.83%	41.17%
- County results Carey: 50–60% 60–70% 70–80% Schwartz: 50–60% 60–70%
U.S. senator before election
Patrick J. Sullivan
Republican
Elected U.S. Senator
Robert D. Carey
Republican

Wyoming special election
Party	Candidate	Votes	%
Republican	Robert D. Carey	42,726	58.83
Democratic	Henry H. Schwartz	29,904	41.17
Majority		12,822	17.66
Turnout		72,630	
Republican hold			

=== Wyoming (regular) ===
1930 United States Senate election in Wyoming
- November 4, 1930
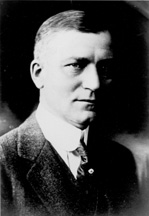

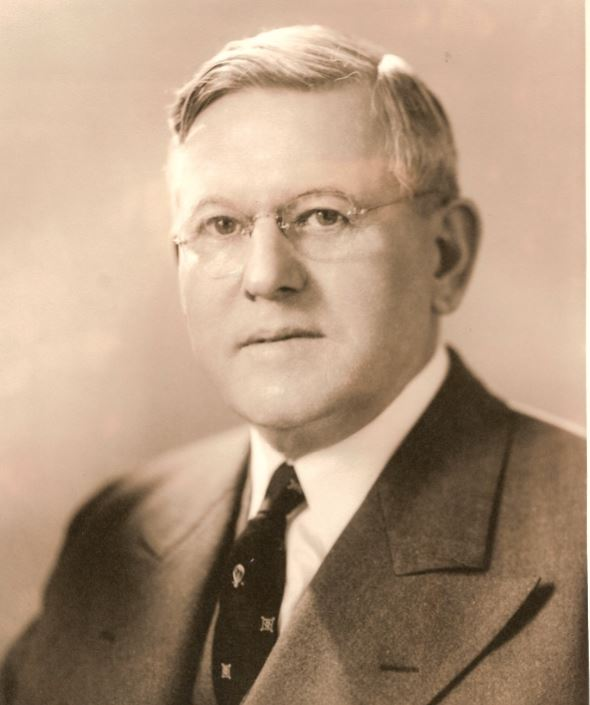
Nominee	Robert D. Carey	Harry Schwartz
Party	Republican	Democratic
Popular vote	43,626	30,259
Percentage	59.05%	40.95%
- County results Carey: 50–60% 60–70% 70–80% Schwartz: 50–60% 60–70%
U.S. senator before election
Patrick J. Sullivan
Republican
Elected U.S. Senator
Robert D. Carey
Republican

Wyoming regular election
Party	Candidate	Votes	%
Republican	Robert D. Carey	43,524	58.99
Democratic	Henry H. Schwartz	30,259	41.01
Majority		13,265	17.98
Turnout		73,783	
Republican hold			

== See also ==
- 1930 United States elections
  - 1930 United States House of Representatives elections
- 71st United States Congress
- 72nd United States Congress
