= 71st United States Congress =

1929–1931 U.S. Congress

←	70th	72nd	→
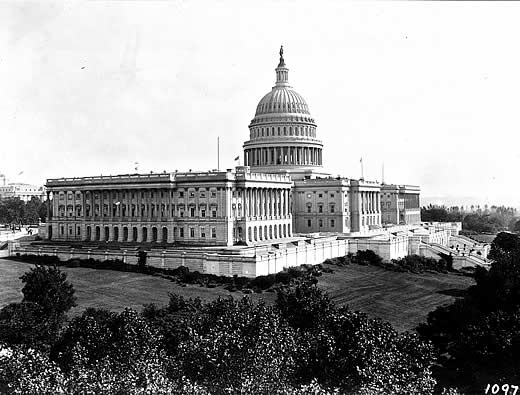
- United States Capitol (1906)

Overview
- Legislative body: United States Congress
- Jurisdiction: United States
- Term: March 4, 1929 – March 4, 1931

Senate
- Members: 96
- President: Charles Curtis (R)
- President pro tempore: George H. Moses (R)
- Party control: Republican

House of Representatives
- Members: 435 representatives 5 non-voting delegates
- Speaker: Nicholas Longworth (R)
- Party control: Republican

Sessions
- Special (Note: Special session of the Senate.): March 4, 1929 – March 5, 1929
- 1st: April 15, 1929 – November 22, 1929
- 2nd: December 2, 1929 – July 3, 1930
- Special (Note: Special session of the Senate.): July 7, 1930 – July 21, 1930
- 3rd: December 1, 1930 – March 3, 1931

The 71st United States Congress was a meeting of the legislature of the United States federal government, consisting of the United States Senate and the United States House of Representatives. It met in Washington, D.C. from March 4, 1929, to March 4, 1931, during the first two years of Herbert Hoover's presidency. The apportionment of seats in the House of Representatives was based on the 1910 United States census.

Both the House and Senate remained under Republican control, with increased majorities in each chamber. And with Herbert Hoover being sworn in as president on March 4, 1929, the Republicans maintained an overall federal government trifecta.

The 71st Congress also featured the most special elections of any Congress with 27 in all.

== Major events ==
- March 4, 1929: Herbert C. Hoover became President of the United States
- October 24, 1929 – October 29, 1929: Wall Street Crash of 1929: Three multi-digit percentage drops wipe out more than $30 billion from the New York Stock Exchange (3 times greater than the annual budget of the federal government).
- October 25, 1929: Former U.S. Interior Secretary Albert B. Fall is convicted of bribery for his role in the Teapot Dome scandal, becoming the first Presidential cabinet member to go to prison for actions in office.

== Major legislation ==
- June 15, 1929: Agriculture Marketing Act, ch. 24, 46 Stat. 11
- June 18, 1929: Reapportionment Act of 1929, ch. 28, 46 Stat. 21
- May 14, 1930: Federal Bureau of Prisons Act, ch. 274, 46 Stat. 325
- June 17, 1930: Hawley-Smoot Tariff Act, ch. 497, 46 Stat. 590, (including: Title III, Plant Patent Act, 46 Stat. 703)
- July 3, 1930: Veterans Administration Act, ch. 863, 46 Stat. 1016
- March 3, 1931: Davis–Bacon Act, ch. 411, 46 Stat. 1494
- March 3, 1931: An Act To make The Star-Spangled Banner the national anthem of the United States of America, ch. 436, 46 Stat. 1508

== Party summary ==
The count below identifies party affiliations at the beginning of the first session of this Congress, and includes members from vacancies and newly admitted states, when they were first seated. Changes resulting from subsequent replacements are shown below in the "Changes in membership" section.

=== Senate ===
	Party (shading shows control)			Total	Vacant
	Democratic (D)	Farmer– Labor (FL)	Republican (R)	Total	Vacant
End of previous congress	45	1	49	95	1
Begin	39	1	54	94	2
End	42	1	53	96	0
Final voting share	43.8%	1.0%	55.2%		
Beginning of next congress	46	1	48	95	1

=== House of Representatives ===
	Party (shading shows control)				Total	Vacant
	Democratic (D)	Farmer– Labor (FL)	Republican (R)	Other	Total	Vacant
End of previous congress	193	2	232	1 (Note: Socialist)	428	7
Begin	164	1	268	0	433	2
End	166	1	265	0	432	3
Final voting share	38.4%	0.2%	61.3%	0.0%		
Beginning of next congress	216	1	217	0	434	1

== Leadership ==
=== Senate ===
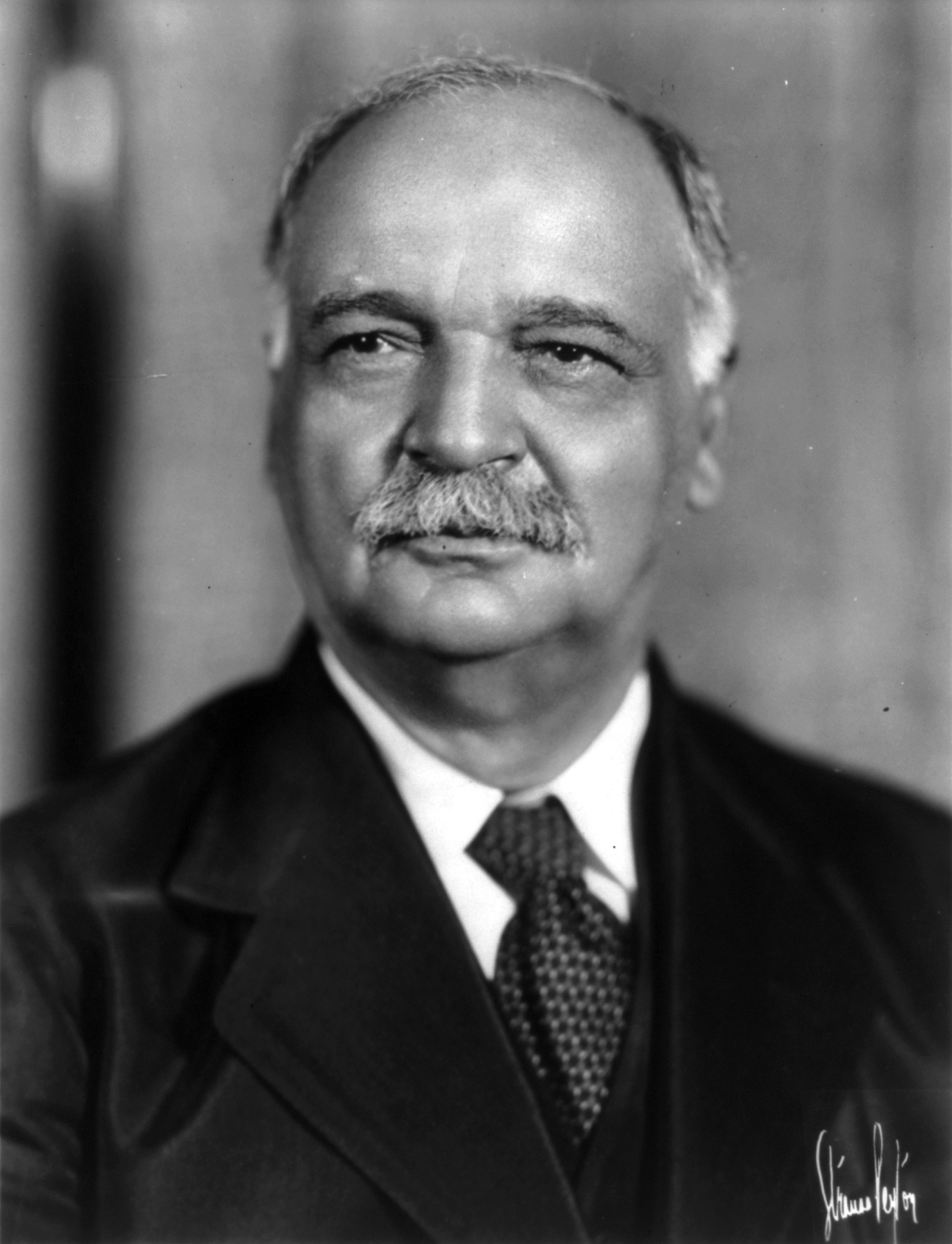
President of the Senate Charles Curtis

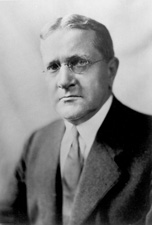
President pro tempore of the Senate George H. Moses

- President: Charles Curtis (R)
- President pro tempore: George H. Moses (R)
- Majority leader: James E. Watson (R)
- Minority leader: Joseph T. Robinson (D)
- Majority whip: Simeon D. Fess (R)
- Minority whip: Morris Sheppard (D)
- Republican Conference Secretary: Frederick Hale
- Democratic Caucus Secretary: Hugo Black

=== House of Representatives ===
- Speaker: Nicholas Longworth (R)
- Majority leader: John Q. Tilson (R)
- Minority leader: John N. Garner (D)
- Majority Whip: Albert Henry Vestal (R)
- Minority Whip: John McDuffie (D)
- Republican Conference Chair: Willis C. Hawley
- Democratic Caucus Chairman: David Hayes Kincheloe
- Democratic Campaign Committee Chairman: Joseph W. Byrns Sr.
- Republican Campaign Committee Chairman: William R. Wood

== Members ==
This list is arranged by chamber, then by state. Senators are listed in order of seniority, and representatives are listed by district.

=== Senate ===
Senators were elected every two years, with one-third beginning new six-year terms with each Congress. Preceding the names in the list below are Senate class numbers, which indicate the cycle of their election. In this Congress, Class 1 meant their term began in this Congress, requiring reelection in 1934; Class 2 meant their term ended with this Congress, requiring reelection in 1930; and Class 3 meant their term began in the last Congress, requiring reelection in 1932.

==== Alabama ====
▌2. J. Thomas Heflin (D)
▌3. Hugo Black (D)

==== Arizona ====
▌1. Henry F. Ashurst (D)
▌3. Carl Hayden (D)

==== Arkansas ====
▌2. Joseph Taylor Robinson (D)
▌3. Thaddeus H. Caraway (D)

==== California ====
▌1. Hiram W. Johnson (R)
▌3. Samuel M. Shortridge (R)

==== Colorado ====
▌2. Lawrence C. Phipps (R)
▌3. Charles W. Waterman (R)

==== Connecticut ====
▌1. Frederic C. Walcott (R)
▌3. Hiram Bingham III (R)

==== Delaware ====
▌1. John G. Townsend Jr. (R)
▌2. Daniel O. Hastings (R)

==== Florida ====
▌1. Park Trammell (D)
▌3. Duncan U. Fletcher (D)

==== Georgia ====
▌2. William J. Harris (D)
▌3. Walter F. George (D)

==== Idaho ====
▌2. William E. Borah (R)
▌3. John Thomas (R)

==== Illinois ====
▌2. Charles S. Deneen (R)
▌3. Otis F. Glenn (R)

==== Indiana ====
▌1. Arthur R. Robinson (R)
▌3. James E. Watson (R)

==== Iowa ====
▌2. Daniel F. Steck (D)
▌3. Smith W. Brookhart (R)

==== Kansas ====
▌2. Arthur Capper (R)
▌3. Henry Justin Allen (R), April 1, 1929 – November 30, 1930

▌George McGill (D), from December 1, 1930

==== Kentucky ====
▌2. Frederic M. Sackett (R), until January 9, 1930

▌John M. Robsion (R), January 11, 1930 – November 30, 1930
▌Ben M. Williamson (D), from December 1, 1930

▌3. Alben W. Barkley (D)

==== Louisiana ====
▌2. Joseph E. Ransdell (D)
▌3. Edwin S. Broussard (D)

==== Maine ====
▌1. Frederick Hale (R)
▌2. Arthur R. Gould (R)

==== Maryland ====
▌1. Phillips Lee Goldsborough (R)
▌3. Millard Tydings (D)

==== Massachusetts ====
▌1. David I. Walsh (D)
▌2. Frederick H. Gillett (R)

==== Michigan ====
▌1. Arthur H. Vandenberg (R)
▌2. James J. Couzens (R)

==== Minnesota ====
▌1. Henrik Shipstead (FL)
▌2. Thomas D. Schall (R)

==== Mississippi ====
▌1. Hubert D. Stephens (D)
▌2. Pat Harrison (D)

==== Missouri ====
▌1. Roscoe C. Patterson (R)
▌3. Harry B. Hawes (D)

==== Montana ====
▌1. Burton K. Wheeler (D)
▌2. Thomas J. Walsh (D)

==== Nebraska ====
▌1. Robert B. Howell (R)
▌2. George W. Norris (R)

==== Nevada ====
▌1. Key Pittman (D)
▌3. Tasker Oddie (R)

==== New Hampshire ====
▌2. Henry W. Keyes (R)
▌3. George H. Moses (R)

==== New Jersey ====
▌1. Hamilton Fish Kean (R)
▌2. Walter Evans Edge (R), until November 21, 1929

▌David Baird Jr. (R), November 30, 1929 – December 2, 1930
▌Dwight Morrow (R), from December 3, 1930

==== New Mexico ====
▌1. Bronson M. Cutting (R)
▌2. Sam G. Bratton (D)

==== New York ====
▌1. Royal S. Copeland (D)
▌3. Robert F. Wagner (D)

==== North Carolina ====
▌2. Furnifold M. Simmons (D)
▌3. Lee S. Overman (D), until December 12, 1930

▌Cameron A. Morrison (D), from December 13, 1930

==== North Dakota ====
▌1. Lynn Frazier (R-NPL)
▌3. Gerald Nye (R)

==== Ohio ====
▌1. Simeon D. Fess (R)
▌3. Theodore E. Burton (R), until October 28, 1929

▌Roscoe C. McCulloch (R), November 5, 1929 – November 30, 1930
▌Robert J. Bulkley (D), from December 1, 1930

==== Oklahoma ====
▌2. William B. Pine (R)
▌3. Elmer Thomas (D)

==== Oregon ====
▌2. Charles L. McNary (R)
▌3. Frederick Steiwer (R)

==== Pennsylvania ====
▌1. David A. Reed (R)
3. Vacant until December 9, 1929

▌Joseph R. Grundy (R), December 11, 1929 – December 1, 1930
▌James J. Davis (R), from December 2, 1930

==== Rhode Island ====
▌1. Felix Hebert (R)
▌2. Jesse H. Metcalf (R)

==== South Carolina ====
▌2. Coleman L. Blease (D)
▌3. Ellison D. Smith (D)

==== South Dakota ====
▌2. William H. McMaster (R)
▌3. Peter Norbeck (R)

==== Tennessee ====
▌1. Kenneth McKellar (D)
▌2. Lawrence Tyson (D), until August 24, 1929

▌William Emerson Brock (D), from September 2, 1929

==== Texas ====
▌1. Tom T. Connally (D)
▌2. Morris Sheppard (D)

==== Utah ====
▌1. William H. King (D)
▌3. Reed Smoot (R)

==== Vermont ====
▌1. Frank L. Greene (R), until December 17, 1930

▌Frank C. Partridge (R), from December 23, 1930

▌3. Porter H. Dale (R)

==== Virginia ====
▌1. Claude A. Swanson (D)
▌2. Carter Glass (D)

==== Washington ====
▌1. Clarence Cleveland Dill (D)
▌3. Wesley Livsey Jones (R)

==== West Virginia ====
▌1. Henry D. Hatfield (R)
▌2. Guy D. Goff (R)

==== Wisconsin ====
▌1. Robert M. La Follette Jr. (R)
▌3. John J. Blaine (R)

==== Wyoming ====
▌1. John B. Kendrick (D)
▌2. Francis E. Warren (R), until November 24, 1929

▌Patrick Joseph Sullivan (R), December 5, 1929 – November 20, 1930
▌Robert D. Carey (R), from December 1, 1930

Senators' party membership by state at the opening of the 71st Congress in March 1929. One of Pennsylvania's seats remained vacant until December 1929. The green stripes denote Farmer-Labor Senator Henrik Shipstead. 2 Democrats 1 Democrat and 1 Republican 2 Republicans

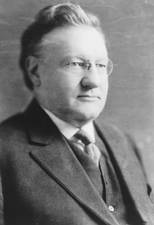
Senate Majority leader James E. Watson

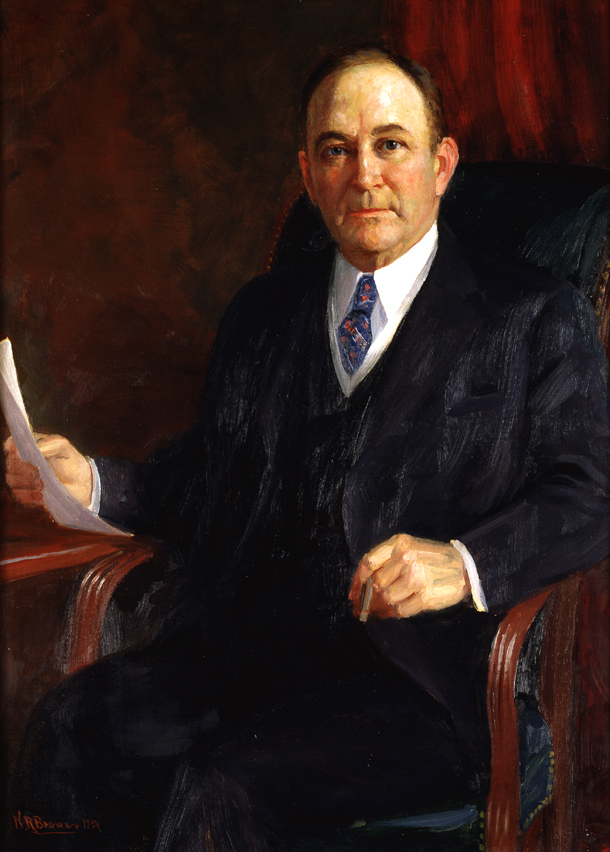
Senate Minority leader Joseph T. Robinson

=== House of Representatives ===
The names of representatives are preceded by their districts.

==== Alabama ====
▌1. John McDuffie (D)
▌2. J. Lister Hill (D)
▌3. Henry B. Steagall (D)
▌4. Lamar Jeffers (D)
▌5. LaFayette L. Patterson (D)
▌6. William B. Oliver (D)
▌7. Miles C. Allgood (D)
▌8. Edward B. Almon (D)
▌9. George Huddleston (D)
▌10. William B. Bankhead (D)

==== Arizona ====
▌At-large. Lewis W. Douglas (D)

==== Arkansas ====
▌1. William J. Driver (D)
▌2. Pearl Peden Oldfield (D)
▌3. Claude A. Fuller (D)
▌4. Otis Wingo (D), until October 21, 1930

▌Effiegene L. Wingo (D), from November 4, 1930

▌5. Heartsill Ragon (D)
▌6. David D. Glover (D)
▌7. Tilman B. Parks (D)

==== California ====
▌1. Clarence F. Lea (D)
▌2. Harry L. Englebright (R)
▌3. Charles F. Curry (R), until October 10, 1930
▌4. Florence P. Kahn (R)
▌5. Richard J. Welch (R)
▌6. Albert E. Carter (R)
▌7. Henry E. Barbour (R)
▌8. Arthur M. Free (R)
▌9. William E. Evans (R)
▌10. Joe Crail (R)
▌11. Philip D. Swing (R)

==== Colorado ====
▌1. William R. Eaton (R)
▌2. Charles B. Timberlake (R)
▌3. Guy U. Hardy (R)
▌4. Edward T. Taylor (D)

==== Connecticut ====
▌1. E. Hart Fenn (R)
▌2. Richard P. Freeman (R)
▌3. John Q. Tilson (R)
▌4. Schuyler Merritt (R)
▌5. James P. Glynn (R), until March 6, 1930

▌Edward W. Goss (R), from November 4, 1930

==== Delaware ====
▌At-large. Robert G. Houston (R)

==== Florida ====
▌1. Herbert J. Drane (D)
▌2. Robert A. Green (D)
▌3. Tom A. Yon (D)
▌4. Ruth Bryan Owen (D)

==== Georgia ====
▌1. Charles G. Edwards (D)
▌2. Edward E. Cox (D)
▌3. Charles R. Crisp (D)
▌4. William C. Wright (D)
▌5. Leslie J. Steele (D), until July 24, 1929

▌Robert Ramspeck (D), from October 2, 1929

▌6. Samuel Rutherford (D)
▌7. Malcolm C. Tarver (D)
▌8. Charles H. Brand (D)
▌9. Thomas Montgomery Bell (D)
▌10. Carl Vinson (D)
▌11. William C. Lankford (D)
▌12. William W. Larsen (D)

==== Idaho ====
▌1. Burton L. French (R)
▌2. Addison T. Smith (R)

==== Illinois ====
▌1. Oscar S. De Priest (R)
▌2. Morton D. Hull (R)
▌3. Elliott W. Sproul (R)
▌4. Thomas A. Doyle (D)
▌5. Adolph J. Sabath (D)
▌6. James T. Igoe (D)
▌7. M. Alfred Michaelson (R)
▌8. Stanley H. Kunz (D)
▌9. Frederick A. Britten (R)
▌10. Carl R. Chindblom (R)
▌11. Frank R. Reid (R)
▌12. John T. Buckbee (R)
▌13. William R. Johnson (R)
▌14. John C. Allen (R)
▌15. Burnett M. Chiperfield (R), from November 4, 1930
▌16. William E. Hull (R)
▌17. Homer W. Hall (R)
▌18. William P. Holaday (R)
▌19. Charles Adkins (R)
▌20. Henry T. Rainey (D)
▌21. Frank M. Ramey (R)
▌22. Edward M. Irwin (R)
▌23. William W. Arnold (D)
▌24. Thomas S. Williams (R), until November 11, 1929

▌Claude V. Parsons (D), from November 4, 1930

▌25. Edward E. Denison (R)
▌At-large. Ruth Hanna McCormick (R)
▌At-large. Richard Yates Jr. (R)

==== Indiana ====
▌1. Harry E. Rowbottom (R)
▌2. Arthur H. Greenwood (D)
▌3. James W. Dunbar (R)
▌4. Harry C. Canfield (D)
▌5. Noble J. Johnson (R)
▌6. Richard N. Elliott (R)
▌7. Louis Ludlow (D)
▌8. Albert H. Vestal (R)
▌9. Fred S. Purnell (R)
▌10. William R. Wood (R)
▌11. Albert R. Hall (R)
▌12. David Hogg (R)
▌13. Andrew J. Hickey (R)

==== Iowa ====
▌1. William F. Kopp (R)
▌2. F. Dickinson Letts (R)
▌3. Thomas J. B. Robinson (R)
▌4. Gilbert N. Haugen (R)
▌5. Cyrenus Cole (R)
▌6. C. William Ramseyer (R)
▌7. Cassius C. Dowell (R)
▌8. Lloyd Thurston (R)
▌9. Charles E. Swanson (R)
▌10. Lester J. Dickinson (R)
▌11. Ed H. Campbell (R)

==== Kansas ====
▌1. William P. Lambertson (R)
▌2. Ulysses S. Guyer (R)
▌3. William H. Sproul (R)
▌4. Homer Hoch (R)
▌5. James G. Strong (R)
▌6. Charles I. Sparks (R)
▌7. Clifford R. Hope (R)
▌8. William A. Ayres (D)

==== Kentucky ====
▌1. William V. Gregory (D)
▌2. David Hayes Kincheloe (D), until October 5, 1930

▌John L. Dorsey Jr. (D), from November 4, 1930

▌3. Charles W. Roark (R), until April 5, 1929

▌John W. Moore (D), from June 1, 1929

▌4. John D. Craddock (R)
▌5. Maurice H. Thatcher (R)
▌6. J. Lincoln Newhall (R)
▌7. Robert E. L. Blackburn (R)
▌8. Lewis L. Walker (R)
▌9. Elva R. Kendall (R)
▌10. Katherine G. Langley (R)
▌11. John M. Robsion (R), until January 10, 1930

▌Charles Finley (R), from February 15, 1930

==== Louisiana ====
▌1. James O'Connor (D)
▌2. J. Zach Spearing (D)
▌3. Whitmell P. Martin (D), until April 6, 1929

▌Numa F. Montet (D), from August 6, 1929

▌4. John N. Sandlin (D)
▌5. Riley Joseph Wilson (D)
▌6. Bolivar E. Kemp (D)
▌7. René L. De Rouen (D)
▌8. James Benjamin Aswell (D)

==== Maine ====
▌1. Carroll L. Beedy (R)
▌2. Wallace H. White Jr. (R)
▌3. John E. Nelson (R)
▌4. Donald F. Snow (R)

==== Maryland ====
▌1. T. Alan Goldsborough (D)
▌2. Linwood L. Clark (R)
▌3. Vincent L. Palmisano (D)
▌4. J. Charles Linthicum (D)
▌5. Stephen W. Gambrill (D)
▌6. Frederick N. Zihlman (R)

==== Massachusetts ====
▌1. Allen T. Treadway (R)
▌2. William Kirk Kaynor (R), until December 20, 1929

▌William J. Granfield (D), from February 11, 1930

▌3. Frank H. Foss (R)
▌4. George R. Stobbs (R)
▌5. Edith Nourse Rogers (R)
▌6. A. Piatt Andrew Jr. (R)
▌7. William P. Connery Jr. (D)
▌8. Frederick W. Dallinger (R)
▌9. Charles L. Underhill (R)
▌10. John J. Douglass (D)
▌11. George H. Tinkham (R)
▌12. John W. McCormack (D)
▌13. Robert Luce (R)
▌14. Richard B. Wigglesworth (R)
▌15. Joseph W. Martin Jr. (R)
▌16. Charles L. Gifford (R)

==== Michigan ====
▌1. Robert H. Clancy (R)
▌2. Earl C. Michener (R)
▌3. Joseph L. Hooper (R)
▌4. John C. Ketcham (R)
▌5. Carl Mapes (R)
▌6. Grant M. Hudson (R)
▌7. Louis C. Cramton (R)
▌8. Bird J. Vincent (R)
▌9. James C. McLaughlin (R)
▌10. Roy O. Woodruff (R)
▌11. Frank P. Bohn (R)
▌12. W. Frank James (R)
▌13. Clarence J. McLeod (R)

==== Minnesota ====
▌1. Victor Christgau (R)
▌2. Frank Clague (R)
▌3. August H. Andresen (R)
▌4. Melvin Maas (R)
▌5. Walter H. Newton (R), until June 30, 1929

▌William I. Nolan (R), from July 17, 1929

▌6. Harold Knutson (R)
▌7. Ole J. Kvale (FL), until September 11, 1929

▌Paul J. Kvale (FL), from October 16, 1929

▌8. William Pittenger (R)
▌9. Conrad Selvig (R)
▌10. Godfrey G. Goodwin (R)

==== Mississippi ====
▌1. John E. Rankin (D)
▌2. Wall Doxey (D)
▌3. William M. Whittington (D)
▌4. T. Jefferson Busby (D)
▌5. Ross A. Collins (D)
▌6. Robert S. Hall (D)
▌7. Percy E. Quin (D)
▌8. James W. Collier (D)

==== Missouri ====
▌1. Milton A. Romjue (D)
▌2. Ralph F. Lozier (D)
▌3. Jacob L. Milligan (D)
▌4. David W. Hopkins (R)
▌5. Edgar C. Ellis (R)
▌6. Thomas J. Halsey (R)
▌7. John W. Palmer (R)
▌8. William L. Nelson (D)
▌9. Clarence Cannon (D)
▌10. Henry F. Niedringhaus (R)
▌11. John J. Cochran (D)
▌12. Leonidas C. Dyer (R)
▌13. Charles E. Kiefner (R)
▌14. Dewey Short (R)
▌15. Joe J. Manlove (R)
▌16. Rowland L. Johnston (R)

==== Montana ====
▌1. John M. Evans (D)
▌2. Scott Leavitt (R)

==== Nebraska ====
▌1. John H. Morehead (D)
▌2. Willis G. Sears (R)
▌3. Edgar Howard (D)
▌4. Charles Henry Sloan (R)
▌5. Fred G. Johnson (R)
▌6. Robert G. Simmons (R)

==== Nevada ====
▌At-large. Samuel S. Arentz (R)

==== New Hampshire ====
▌1. Fletcher Hale (R)
▌2. Edward Hills Wason (R)

==== New Jersey ====
▌1. Charles A. Wolverton (R)
▌2. Isaac Bacharach (R)
▌3. Harold G. Hoffman (R)
▌4. Charles A. Eaton (R)
▌5. Ernest R. Ackerman (R)
▌6. Randolph Perkins (R)
▌7. George N. Seger (R)
▌8. Fred A. Hartley Jr. (R)
▌9. Franklin W. Fort (R)
▌10. Frederick R. Lehlbach (R)
▌11. Oscar L. Auf der Heide (D)
▌12. Mary T. Norton (D)

==== New Mexico ====
▌At-large. Albert Gallatin Simms (R)

==== New York ====
▌1. Robert L. Bacon (R)
▌2. William F. Brunner (D)
▌3. George W. Lindsay (D)
▌4. Thomas H. Cullen (D)
▌5. Loring M. Black Jr. (D)
▌6. Andrew L. Somers (D)
▌7. John F. Quayle (D), until November 27, 1930
▌8. Patrick J. Carley (D)
▌9. David J. O'Connell (D), until December 29, 1930

▌Stephen A. Rudd (D), from February 17, 1931

▌10. Emanuel Celler (D)
▌11. Anning S. Prall (D)
▌12. Samuel Dickstein (D)
▌13. Christopher D. Sullivan (D)
▌14. William I. Sirovich (D)
▌15. John J. Boylan (D)
▌16. John J. O'Connor (D)
▌17. Ruth Baker Pratt (R)
▌18. John F. Carew (D), until December 28, 1929

▌Martin J. Kennedy (D), from April 11, 1930

▌19. Sol Bloom (D)
▌20. Fiorello H. LaGuardia (R)
▌21. Joseph A. Gavagan (D), from November 5, 1929
▌22. Anthony J. Griffin (D)
▌23. Frank Oliver (D)
▌24. James M. Fitzpatrick (D)
▌25. J. Mayhew Wainwright (R)
▌26. Hamilton Fish III (R)
▌27. Harcourt J. Pratt (R)
▌28. Parker Corning (D)
▌29. James S. Parker (R)
▌30. Frank Crowther (R)
▌31. Bertrand H. Snell (R)
▌32. Francis D. Culkin (R)
▌33. Frederick M. Davenport (R)
▌34. John D. Clarke (R)
▌35. Clarence E. Hancock (R)
▌36. John Taber (R)
▌37. Gale H. Stalker (R)
▌38. James L. Whitley (R)
▌39. Archie D. Sanders (R)
▌40. S. Wallace Dempsey (R)
▌41. Edmund F. Cooke (R)
▌42. James M. Mead (D)
▌43. Daniel A. Reed (R)

==== North Carolina ====
▌1. Lindsay C. Warren (D)
▌2. John H. Kerr (D)
▌3. Charles L. Abernethy (D)
▌4. Edward W. Pou (D)
▌5. Charles M. Stedman (D), until September 23, 1930

▌Franklin W. Hancock Jr. (D), from November 4, 1930

▌6. J. Bayard Clark (D)
▌7. William C. Hammer (D), until September 26, 1930

▌Hinton James (D), from November 4, 1930

▌8. Robert L. Doughton (D)
▌9. Charles A. Jonas (R)
▌10. George M. Pritchard (R)

==== North Dakota ====
▌1. Olger B. Burtness (R)
▌2. Thomas Hall (R)
▌3. James H. Sinclair (R)

==== Ohio ====
▌1. Nicholas Longworth (R)
▌2. William E. Hess (R)
▌3. Roy G. Fitzgerald (R)
▌4. John L. Cable (R)
▌5. Charles J. Thompson (R)
▌6. Charles C. Kearns (R)
▌7. Charles Brand (R)
▌8. Grant E. Mouser Jr. (R)
▌9. William W. Chalmers (R)
▌10. Thomas A. Jenkins (R)
▌11. Mell G. Underwood (D)
▌12. John C. Speaks (R)
▌13. Joseph E. Baird (R)
▌14. Francis Seiberling (R)
▌15. C. Ellis Moore (R)
▌16. Charles B. McClintock (R)
▌17. William M. Morgan (R)
▌18. B. Frank Murphy (R)
▌19. John G. Cooper (R)
▌20. Charles A. Mooney (D)
▌21. Robert Crosser (D)
▌22. Chester C. Bolton (R)

==== Oklahoma ====
▌1. Charles O'Connor (R)
▌2. William W. Hastings (D)
▌3. Wilburn Cartwright (D)
▌4. Tom D. McKeown (D)
▌5. Ulysses S. Stone (R)
▌6. Jed J. Johnson (D)
▌7. James V. McClintic (D)
▌8. Milton C. Garber (R)

==== Oregon ====
▌1. Willis C. Hawley (R)
▌2. Robert R. Butler (R)
▌3. Franklin F. Korell (R)

==== Pennsylvania ====
▌1. James M. Beck (R)
▌2. George S. Graham (R)
▌3. Harry C. Ransley (R)
▌4. Benjamin M. Golder (R)
▌5. James J. Connolly (R)
▌6. George A. Welsh (R)
▌7. George P. Darrow (R)
▌8. James Wolfenden (R)
▌9. Henry W. Watson (R)
▌10. William W. Griest (R), until December 5, 1929

▌J. Roland Kinzer (R), from January 28, 1930

▌11. Laurence H. Watres (R)
▌12. John J. Casey (D), until May 5, 1929

▌C. Murray Turpin (R), from June 4, 1929

▌13. George F. Brumm (R)
▌14. Charles J. Esterly (R)
▌15. Louis T. McFadden (R)
▌16. Edgar R. Kiess (R), until July 20, 1930

▌Robert F. Rich (R), from November 4, 1930

▌17. Frederick W. Magrady (R)
▌18. Edward M. Beers (R)
▌19. Isaac H. Doutrich (R)
▌20. James R. Leech (R)
▌21. J. Banks Kurtz (R)
▌22. Franklin Menges (R)
▌23. J. Mitchell Chase (R)
▌24. Samuel A. Kendall (R)
▌25. Henry W. Temple (R)
▌26. J. Howard Swick (R)
▌27. Nathan L. Strong (R)
▌28. Thomas C. Cochran (R)
▌29. Milton W. Shreve (R)
▌30. William R. Coyle (R)
▌31. Adam M. Wyant (R)
▌32. Stephen G. Porter (R), until June 27, 1930

▌Edmund F. Erk (R), from November 4, 1930

▌33. M. Clyde Kelly (R)
▌34. Patrick J. Sullivan (R)
▌35. Harry A. Estep (R)
▌36. Guy E. Campbell (R)

==== Rhode Island ====
▌1. Clark Burdick (R)
▌2. Richard S. Aldrich (R)
▌3. Jeremiah E. O'Connell (D), until May 9, 1930

▌Francis B. Condon (D), from November 4, 1930

==== South Carolina ====
▌1. Thomas S. McMillan (D)
▌2. Butler B. Hare (D)
▌3. Fred H. Dominick (D)
▌4. John J. McSwain (D)
▌5. William F. Stevenson (D)
▌6. Allard H. Gasque (D)
▌7. Hampton P. Fulmer (D)

==== South Dakota ====
▌1. Charles A. Christopherson (R)
▌2. Royal C. Johnson (R)
▌3. William Williamson (R)

==== Tennessee ====
▌1. B. Carroll Reece (R)
▌2. J. Will Taylor (R)
▌3. Samuel D. McReynolds (D)
▌4. Cordell Hull (D)
▌5. Ewin L. Davis (D)
▌6. Joseph W. Byrns (D)
▌7. Edward E. Eslick (D)
▌8. Gordon Browning (D)
▌9. Jere Cooper (D)
▌10. Hubert Fisher (D)

==== Texas ====
▌1. Wright Patman (D)
▌2. John C. Box (D)
▌3. Morgan G. Sanders (D)
▌4. Sam Rayburn (D)
▌5. Hatton W. Sumners (D)
▌6. Luther Alexander Johnson (D)
▌7. Clay Stone Briggs (D)
▌8. Daniel E. Garrett (D)
▌9. Joseph J. Mansfield (D)
▌10. James P. Buchanan (D)
▌11. Oliver H. Cross (D)
▌12. Fritz G. Lanham (D)
▌13. Guinn Williams (D)
▌14. Augustus McCloskey (D), until February 10, 1930

▌Harry M. Wurzbach (R), from February 10, 1930

▌15. John Nance Garner (D)
▌16. Claude B. Hudspeth (D)
▌17. Robert Q. Lee (D), until April 18, 1930

▌Thomas L. Blanton (D), from May 20, 1930

▌18. John Marvin Jones (D)

==== Utah ====
▌1. Don B. Colton (R)
▌2. Elmer O. Leatherwood (R), until December 24, 1929

▌Frederick C. Loofbourow (R), from November 4, 1930

==== Vermont ====
▌1. Elbert S. Brigham (R)
▌2. Ernest Willard Gibson (R)

==== Virginia ====
▌1. S. Otis Bland (D)
▌2. Menalcus Lankford (R)
▌3. Andrew Jackson Montague (D)
▌4. Patrick H. Drewry (D)
▌5. Joseph Whitehead (D)
▌6. Clifton A. Woodrum (D)
▌7. Jacob A. Garber (R)
▌8. R. Walton Moore (D)
▌9. Joseph C. Shaffer (R)
▌10. Henry St. George Tucker III (D)

==== Washington ====
▌1. John Franklin Miller (R)
▌2. Lindley H. Hadley (R)
▌3. Albert Johnson (R)
▌4. John W. Summers (R)
▌5. Samuel B. Hill (D)

==== West Virginia ====
▌1. Carl G. Bachmann (R)
▌2. Frank L. Bowman (R)
▌3. John M. Wolverton (R)
▌4. James Anthony Hughes (R), until March 2, 1930

▌Robert L. Hogg (R), from November 4, 1930

▌5. Hugh Ike Shott (R)
▌6. Joe L. Smith (D)

==== Wisconsin ====
▌1. Henry Allen Cooper (R), until March 1, 1931
▌2. Charles A. Kading (R)
▌3. John M. Nelson (R)
▌4. John C. Schafer (R)
▌5. William H. Stafford (R)
▌6. Florian Lampert (R), until July 18, 1930

▌Michael K. Reilly (D), from December 1, 1930

▌7. Merlin Hull (R)
▌8. Edward E. Browne (R)
▌9. George J. Schneider (R)
▌10. James A. Frear (R)
▌11. Hubert H. Peavey (R)

==== Wyoming ====
▌At-large. Vincent Carter (R)

==== Non-voting members ====
▌Alaska Territory. Daniel Sutherland (R)
▌Hawaii Territory. Victor S. K. Houston (R)
▌Philippines. Pedro Guevara (Nac.)
▌Philippines. Camilo Osías (Nac.)
▌Puerto Rico. Félix Córdova Dávila (UPR)

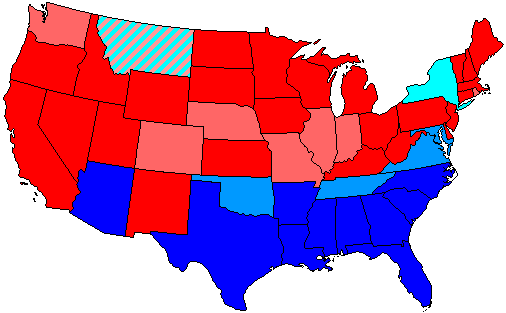
House seats by party holding plurality in state: 80+% to 100% Democratic / 80+% to 100% Republican; 60+% to 80% Democratic / 60+% to 80% Republican; Up to 60% Democratic / Up to 60% Republican

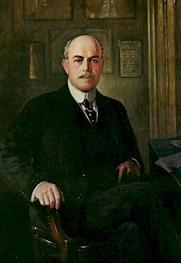
Speaker of the House Nicholas Longworth

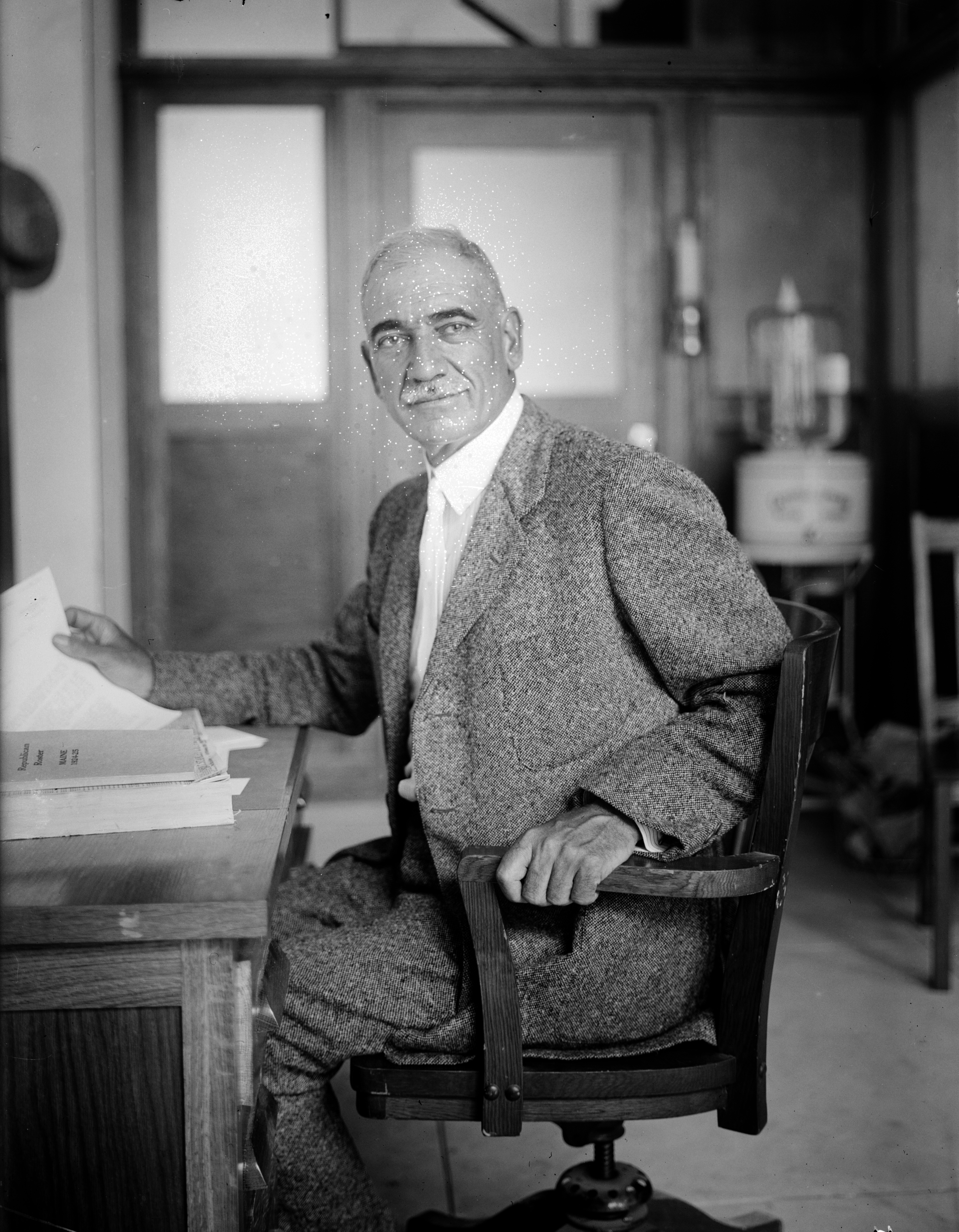
Majority leader of the House John Tilson

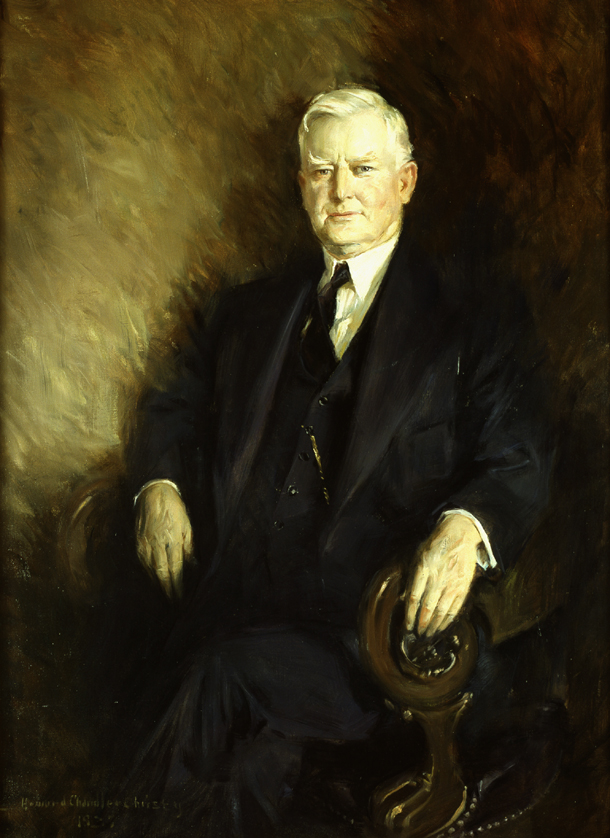
Minority leader of the House John Garner

== Changes in membership ==
The count below reflects changes from the beginning of the first session of this Congress.

=== Senate ===
- Replacements: 15
  - Democratic: 3-seat net gain
  - Republican: 1-seat net loss
- Deaths: 5
- Resignations: 3
- Interim appointments: 6
- Total seats with changes: 9

Senate changes
State (class)	Vacated by	Reason for change	Successor	Date of successor's formal installation (Note: When seated or oath administered, not necessarily when service began.)
Kansas (3)	Vacant	Charles Curtis (R) had resigned at end of previous congress to become Vice President of the United States. Successor appointed April 1, 1929, to continue the term. Successor later lost nomination to finish the term, see below.	Henry J. Allen (R)	April 1, 1929
Pennsylvania (3)	Vacant	Sen.-elect William S. Vare (R) was apparently elected but vote was never certified by the Governor due to election irregularities. The Senate refused to qualify him and he was formally unseated December 9, 1929. Successor appointed December 11, 1929. Successor later lost nomination to finish the term, see below.	Joseph R. Grundy (R)	December 11, 1929
Tennessee (2)	Lawrence Tyson (D)	Died August 24, 1929. Successor appointed September 2, 1929, to continue the term. Successor was also later elected November 4, 1930, to finish the term.	William E. Brock (D)	September 2, 1929
Ohio (3)	Theodore E. Burton (R)	Died October 28, 1929. Successor appointed November 5, 1929, to continue the term. Successor later lost election to finish the term, see below.	Roscoe C. McCulloch (R)	November 5, 1929
New Jersey (2)	Walter E. Edge (R)	Resigned November 21, 1929, to become U.S. Ambassador to France. Successor appointed November 30, 1929, to continue the term. Successor later did not run to finish the term, see below.	David Baird Jr. (R)	November 30, 1929
Wyoming (2)	Francis E. Warren (R)	Died November 24, 1929. Successor appointed December 5, 1929. Successor later did not run to finish the term, see below.	Patrick J. Sullivan (R)	December 5, 1929
Kentucky (2)	Frederic M. Sackett (R)	Resigned January 9, 1930, to become U.S. Ambassador to Germany. Successor appointed January 11, 1930, to continue the term. Successor later lost election to finish the term, see below.	John M. Robsion (R)	January 11, 1930
Wyoming (2)	Patrick Joseph Sullivan (R)	Interim appointee did not run to finish the term. Successor elected November 4, 1930.	Robert D. Carey (R)	December 1, 1930
Kansas (3)	Henry J. Allen (R)	Interim appointee lost election to finish the term. Successor elected November 4, 1930.	George McGill (D)	December 1, 1930
Kentucky (2)	John M. Robsion (R)	Interim appointee lost election to finish the term. Successor elected November 4, 1930.	Ben M. Williamson (D)	December 1, 1930
Ohio (3)	Roscoe C. McCulloch (R)	Interim appointee lost election to finish the term. Successor elected November 4, 1930.	Robert J. Bulkley (D)	December 1, 1930
Pennsylvania (3)	Joseph R. Grundy (R)	Interim appointee lost nomination to finish the term. Successor elected November 4, 1930.	James J. Davis (R)	December 2, 1930
New Jersey (2)	David Baird Jr. (R)	Interim appointee did not run to finish the term. Successor elected November 4, 1930.	Dwight Morrow (R)	December 3, 1930
North Carolina (3)	Lee S. Overman (D)	Died December 12, 1930. Successor appointed December 13, 1930, to continue the term. Successor later lost election to finish the term, see (72nd United States Congress).	Cameron A. Morrison (D)	December 13, 1930
Vermont (1)	Frank L. Greene (R)	Died December 17, 1930. Successor appointed December 23, 1930, to continue the term. Successor later lost nomination to finish the term, see (72nd United States Congress).	Frank C. Partridge (R)	December 23, 1930

=== House of Representatives ===
- Replacements: 27
  - Democratic: 4 seat net gain
  - Republican: 3 seat net loss
- Deaths: 25
- Resignations: 6
- Contested election: 1
- Total seats with changes: 32

District	Vacated by	Reason for vacancy	Successor	Date of successor's installation
New York 21st	Vacant	Rep. Royal H. Weller died during previous congress	Joseph A. Gavagan (D)	November 5, 1929
Illinois 15th	Vacant	Rep. Edward J. King died in previous congress	Burnett M. Chiperfield (R)	November 4, 1930
Kentucky 3rd	Charles W. Roark (R)	Died April 5, 1929	John W. Moore (D)	June 1, 1929
Louisiana 3rd	Whitmell P. Martin (D)	Died April 6, 1929	Numa F. Montet (D)	August 6, 1929
Pennsylvania 12th	John J. Casey (D)	Died May 5, 1929	Charles M. Turpin (R)	June 1, 1929
Minnesota 5th	Walter Newton (R)	Resigned June 30, 1929, after being appointed secretary to President Herbert Hoover	William I. Nolan (R)	July 17, 1929
Georgia 5th	Leslie J. Steele (D)	Died July 24, 1929	Robert Ramspeck (D)	October 2, 1929
Minnesota 7th	Ole J. Kvale (FL)	Died September 11, 1929	Paul J. Kvale (FL)	October 16, 1929
New York 18th	John F. Carew (D)	Resigned December 28, 1929, after being appointed a justice to the New York Supreme Court	Martin J. Kennedy (D)	April 11, 1930
Illinois 24th	Thomas S. Williams (R)	Resigned November 11, 1929, after being appointed to the United States Court of Claims	Claude V. Parsons (D)	November 4, 1930
Pennsylvania 10th	William W. Griest (R)	Died December 5, 1929	J. Roland Kinzer (R)	January 28, 1930
Massachusetts 2nd	Will Kirk Kaynor (R)	Died December 20, 1929	William J. Granfield (D)	February 17, 1930
Utah 2nd	Elmer O. Leatherwood (R)	Died December 24, 1929	Frederick C. Loofbourow (R)	November 4, 1930
Kentucky 11th	John M. Robsion (R)	Resigned January 10, 1930, after being appointed to the U.S. Senate	Charles Finley (R)	February 15, 1930
Texas 14th	Augustus McCloskey (D)	Lost contested election February 10, 1930	Harry M. Wurzbach (R)	February 10, 1930
West Virginia 4th	James A. Hughes (R)	Died March 2, 1930	Robert L. Hogg (R)	November 4, 1930
Connecticut 5th	James P. Glynn (R)	Died March 6, 1930	Edward W. Goss (R)	November 4, 1930
Texas 17th	Robert Q. Lee (D)	Died April 18, 1930	Thomas L. Blanton (D)	May 20, 1930
Rhode Island 3rd	Jeremiah E. O'Connell (D)	Resigned May 9, 1930, after being appointed a justice to the Rhode Island Superior Court	Francis Condon (D)	November 4, 1930
Wisconsin 6th	Florian Lampert (R)	Died July 18, 1930	Michael Reilly (D)	December 1, 1930
Pennsylvania 32nd	Edgar R. Kiess (R)	Died July 20, 1930	Robert F. Rich (R)	November 4, 1930
Pennsylvania 16th	Stephen G. Porter (R)	Died June 27, 1930	Edmund F. Erk (R)	November 4, 1930
North Carolina 5th	Charles M. Stedman (D)	Died September 23, 1930	Franklin W. Hancock Jr. (D)	November 4, 1930
North Carolina 7th	William C. Hammer (D)	Died September 26, 1930	Hinton James (D)	November 4, 1930
Kentucky 2nd	David H. Kincheloe (D)	Resigned October 5, 1930, after being appointed to the United States Customs Court	John L. Dorsey Jr. (D)	November 4, 1930
California 3rd	Charles F. Curry (R)	Died October 10, 1930	Seat remained vacant until next Congress	
Arkansas 4th	Otis Wingo (D)	Died October 21, 1930	Effiegene Locke Wingo (D)	November 4, 1930
New York 7th	John Quayle (D)	Died November 27, 1930	Seat remained vacant until next Congress	
New York 9th	David J. O'Connell (D)	Died December 29, 1930	Stephen A. Rudd (D)	February 17, 1931
Wisconsin 1st	Henry A. Cooper (R)	Died March 1, 1931	Seat remained vacant until next Congress	

== Committees ==
Lists of committees and their party leaders for members of the House and Senate committees can be found through the Official Congressional Directory at the bottom of this article. The directory after the pages of terms of service lists committees of the Senate, House (Standing with Subcommittees, Select and Special) and Joint and, after that, House/Senate committee assignments. On the committees section of the House and Senate in the Official Congressional Directory, the committee's members on the first row on the left side shows the chairman of the committee and on the right side shows the ranking member of the committee.

=== Senate ===
- Agriculture and Forestry (Chairman: Charles L. McNary; Ranking Member: Ellison D. Smith)
- Air Mail and Ocean Mail Contracts (Special)
- Alaska Railroad (Special Select)
- Appropriations (Chairman: Francis E. Warren then Wesley L. Jones; Ranking Member: William J. Harris)
- Audit and Control the Contingent Expenses of the Senate (Chairman: Charles S. Deneen; Ranking Member: Thaddeus H. Caraway)
- Banking and Currency (Chairman: Peter Norbeck; Ranking Member: Duncan U. Fletcher)
- Civil Service (Chairman: Porter H. Dale; Ranking Member: Kenneth McKellar)
- Claims (Chairman: Robert B. Howell; Ranking Member: Park Trammell)
- Commerce (Chairman: Hiram W. Johnson; Ranking Member: Duncan U. Fletcher)
- Depreciation of Foreign Currencies (Select)
- District of Columbia (Chairman: Arthur Capper; Ranking Member: William H. King)
- Education and Labor (Chairman: Jesse H. Metcalf; Ranking Member: Royal S. Copeland)
- Enrolled Bills (Chairman: Frank L. Greene; Ranking Member: Coleman L. Blease)
- Expenditures in Executive Departments (Chairman: Frederick M. Sackett then Guy D. Goff; Ranking Member: Claude A. Swanson)
- Finance (Chairman: Reed Smoot; Ranking Member: Furnifold M. Simmons)
- Foreign Relations (Chairman: William E. Borah; Ranking Member: Claude A. Swanson)
- Immigration (Chairman: Arthur R. Gould; Ranking Member: William H. King)
- Indian Affairs (Chairman: Lynn J. Frazier; Ranking Member: Henry F. Ashurst)
- Interoceanic Canals (Chairman: Thomas D. Schall; Ranking Member: Thomas J. Walsh)
- Interstate Commerce (Chairman: James Couzens; Ranking Member: Ellison D. Smith)
- Irrigation and Reclamation (Chairman: John Thomas; Ranking Member: Morris Sheppard)
- Judiciary (Chairman: George W. Norris; Ranking Member: Lee S. Overman then Henry F. Ashurst)
- Library (Chairman: Simeon D. Fess; Ranking Member: Kenneth McKellar)
- Manufactures (Chairman: Robert M. La Follette Jr.; Ranking Member: Ellison D. Smith)
- Military Affairs (Chairman: David A. Reed; Ranking Member: Duncan U. Fletcher)
- Mines and Mining (Chairman: Roscoe C. Patterson; Ranking Member: Thomas J. Walsh)
- Mississippi Flood Control Project (Select)
- Naval Affairs (Chairman: Frederick Hale; Ranking Member: Claude A. Swanson)
- Patents (Chairman: Charles W. Waterman; Ranking Member: Ellison D. Smith)
- Pensions (Chairman: Arthur R. Robinson; Ranking Member: Burton K. Wheeler)
- Post Office Leases (Select)
- Post Office and Post Roads (Chairman: Lawrence C. Phipps; Ranking Member: Kenneth McKellar)
- Printing (Chairman: George H. Moses; Ranking Member: Duncan U. Fletcher)
- Privileges and Elections (Chairman: Samuel M. Shortridge; Ranking Member: William H. King)
- Public Buildings and Grounds (Chairman: Henry W. Keyes; Ranking Member: Duncan U. Fletcher)
- Public Lands and Surveys (Chairman: Gerald P. Nye; Ranking Member: Key Pittman)
- Reconstruction Finance Corporation (Select)
- Rules (Chairman: George H. Moses; Ranking Member: Lee S. Overman then Pat Harrison)
- Territories and Insular Affairs (Chairman: Hiram Bingham; Ranking Member: Key Pittman)
- Whole

=== House of Representatives ===
- Accounts (Chairman: Charles L. Underhill; Ranking Member: Lindsay C. Warren)
- Agriculture (Chairman: Gilbert N. Haugen; Ranking Member: James B. Aswell)
- Appropriations (Chairman: William R. Wood; Ranking Member: Joseph W. Byrns)
- Banking and Currency (Chairman: Louis T. McFadden; Ranking Member: Otis Wingo then John E. Rankin)
- Census (Chairman: E. Hart Fenn; Ranking Member: John E. Rankin)
- Civil Service (Chairman: Frederick R. Lehlbach; Ranking Member: Lamar Jeffers)
- Claims (Chairman: Edward M. Irwin; Ranking Member: John C. Box)
- Coinage, Weights and Measures (Chairman: Randolph Perkins; Ranking Member: Edgar Howard)
- Disposition of Executive Papers (Chairman: Edward H. Wason; Ranking Member: Robert A. Green)
- District of Columbia (Chairman: Frederick N. Zihlman; Ranking Member: Christopher D. Sullivan)
- Education (Chairman: Daniel A. Reed; Ranking Member: Loring M. Black)
- Election of the President, Vice President and Representatives in Congress (Chairman: Charles L. Gifford; Ranking Member: Lamar Jeffers)
- Elections No.#1 (Chairman: Carroll L. Beedy; Ranking Member: Edward E. Eslick)
- Elections No.#2 (Chairman: Bird J. Vincent; Ranking Member: John J. Douglass)
- Elections No.#3 (Chairman: Willis G. Sears; Ranking Member: John H. Kerr)
- Enrolled Bills (Chairman: Guy E. Campbell; Ranking Member: Mell G. Underwood)
- Expenditures in the Executive Departments (Chairman: William Williamson; Ranking Member: Allard H. Gasque)
- Flood Control (Chairman: Frank R. Reid; Ranking Member: Riley J. Wilson)
- Foreign Affairs (Chairman: Stephen G. Porter; Ranking Member: J. Charles Linthicum)
- Immigration and Naturalization (Chairman: Albert Johnson; Ranking Member: John C. Box)
- Indian Affairs (Chairman: Scott Leavitt; Ranking Member: John M. Evans)
- Insular Affairs (Chairman: Edgar R. Kiess; Ranking Member: Christopher D. Sullivan)
- Interstate and Foreign Commerce (Chairman: James S. Parker; Ranking Member: Sam Rayburn)
- Invalid Pensions (Chairman: John M. Nelson; Ranking Member: Mell G. Underwood)
- Irrigation and Reclamation (Chairman: Addison T. Smith; Ranking Member: C. B. Hudspeth)
- Judiciary (Chairman: George S. Graham; Ranking Member: Hatton W. Sumners)
- Labor (Chairman: William F. Kopp; Ranking Member: William P. Connery Jr.)
- Library (Chairman: Robert Luce; Ranking Member: Lindsay C. Warren)
- Memorials (Chairman: Burton L. French; Ranking Member: N/A)
- Merchant Marine and Fisheries (Chairman: Wallace H. White Jr.; Ranking Member: Ewin L. Davis)
- Military Affairs (Chairman: W. Frank James; Ranking Member: Percy E. Quin)
- Mines and Mining (Chairman: William H. Sproul; Ranking Member: Arthur H. Greenwood)
- Naval Affairs (Chairman: Frederick A. Britten; Ranking Member: Carl Vinson)
- Patents (Chairman: Albert H. Vestal; Ranking Member: Fritz G. Lanham)
- Pensions (Chairman: Harold Knutson; Ranking Member: Allard H. Gasque)
- Post Office and Post Roads (Chairman: Archie D. Sanders; Ranking Member: Thomas M. Bell)
- Printing (Chairman: Edward M. Beers; Ranking Member: William F. Stevenson)
- Public Buildings and Grounds (Chairman: Richard N. Elliott; Ranking Member: Fritz G. Lanham)
- Public Lands (Chairman: Don B. Colton; Ranking Member: John M. Evans)
- Revision of Laws (Chairman: Roy G. Fitzgerald; Ranking Member: Loring M. Black)
- Rivers and Harbors (Chairman: S. Wallace Dempsey; Ranking Member: Joseph J. Mansfield)
- Roads (Chairman: Cassius C. Dowell; Ranking Member: Edward B. Almon)
- Rules (Chairman: Bertrand H. Snell; Ranking Member: Edward W. Pou)
- Standards of Official Conduct
- Territories (Chairman: Charles F. Curry; Ranking Member: William C. Lankford)
- War Claims (Chairman: James G. Strong; Ranking Member: Miles C. Allgood)
- Ways and Means (Chairman: Willis C. Hawley; Ranking Member: John N. Garner)
- World War Veterans' Legislation (Chairman: Royal C. Johnson; Ranking Member: John E. Rankin)
- Whole

=== Joint committees ===
- Conditions of Indian Tribes (Special)
- Disposition of (Useless) Executive Papers
- The Library (Chairman: Sen. Simeon D. Fess)
- Printing (Chairman: Sen. George H. Moses then Duncan U. Fletcher; Vice Chairman: Rep. Edgar R. Kiess)
- Taxation (Chairman: Rep. Willis C. Hawley)
- Veterans' Affairs

== Caucuses ==
- Democratic (House)
- Democratic (Senate)

== Officers ==
=== Legislative branch agency directors ===
- Architect of the Capitol: David Lynn
- Attending Physician of the United States Congress: George Calver
- Comptroller General of the United States: John R. McCarl
- Librarian of Congress: Herbert Putnam
- Public Printer of the United States: George H. Carter

=== Senate ===
- Secretary: Edwin P. Thayer
- Sergeant at Arms: David S. Barry
- Librarian: Edward C. Goodwin
- Chaplain: ZeBarney T. Phillips (Episcopalian)
- Democratic Party Secretary: Edwin A. Halsey, from 1929
- Republican Party Secretary: Carl A. Loeffler, from 1929

=== House of Representatives ===
- Clerk: William T. Page
- Sergeant at Arms: Joseph G. Rodgers
- Doorkeeper: Bert W. Kennedy
- Postmaster: Frank W. Collier
- Parliamentarian: Lewis Deschler
- Reading Clerks: Patrick Joseph Haltigan (D) and Alney E. Chaffee (R)
- Chaplain: James S. Montgomery (Methodist)

== See also ==
- 1928 United States elections (elections leading to this Congress)
  - 1928 United States presidential election
  - 1928 United States Senate elections
  - 1928 United States House of Representatives elections
- 1930 United States elections (elections during this Congress, leading to the next Congress)
  - 1930 United States Senate elections
  - 1930 United States House of Representatives elections
