= List of United States Senate elections in Wyoming =

United States Senate elections in Wyoming occur when voters in Wyoming select an individual to represent the state in the United States Senate in either of the state's two seats allotted by the U.S. Constitution. Regularly scheduled general elections occur on Election Day, coinciding with various other federal, statewide, and local races.

Senate elections in Wyoming: Results 1988–2020
Year	Democratic	Votes	Pct	Republican	Votes	Pct
1988	John Vinich	89,821	49.6%	Malcolm Wallop (inc.)	91,143	50.4%
1990	Kathy Helling	56,848	36%	Al Simpson (inc.)	100,784	64%
1994	Mike Sullivan	79,287	39%	Craig L. Thomas	118,754	59%
1996	Kathy Karpan	89,103	42%	Mike Enzi	114,116	54%
2000	Mel Logan	47,087	22%	Craig L. Thomas (inc.)	157,622	74%
2002	Joyce Corcoran	49,570	27%	Mike Enzi (inc.)	133,710	73%
2006	Dale Groutage	57,671	30%	Craig L. Thomas (inc.)	135,174	70%
2008 (Special)	Nick Carter	66,202	27%	John Barrasso (inc.)	183,063	73%
2008	Chris Rothfuss	60,631	24%	Mike Enzi (inc.)	189,046	76%
2012	Tim Chesnut	52,596	22%	John Barrasso (inc.)	184,531	76%
2014	Charlie Hardy	29,377	17%	Mike Enzi (inc.)	121,554	72%
2018	Gary Trauner	61,227	30%	John Barrasso (inc.)	136,210	67%
2020	Merav Ben-David	72,766	26%	Cynthia Lummis	198,100	72%
