= 1936 United States Senate election in Wyoming =

- November 3, 1936
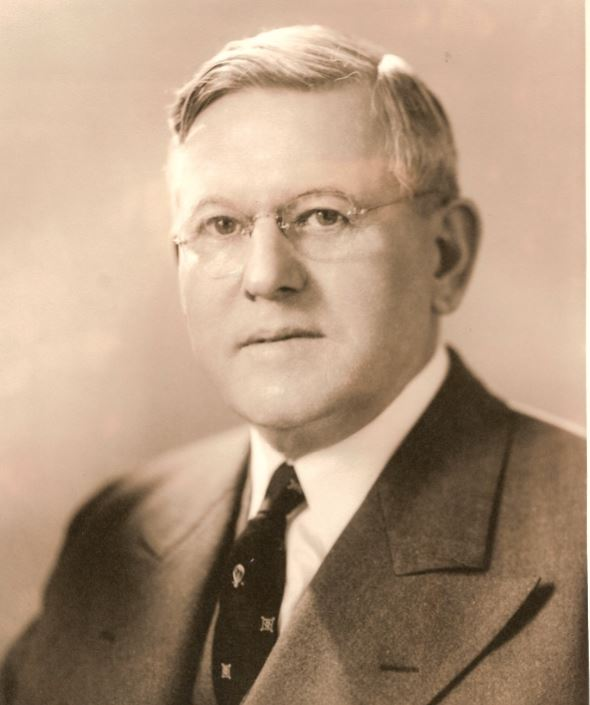

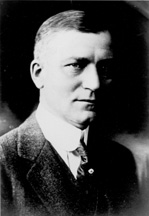
Nominee	Harry Schwartz	Robert D. Carey
Party	Democratic	Republican
Popular vote	53,919	45,483
Percentage	53.83%	45.40%
- County results Schwartz: 50–60% 60–70% 70–80% Carey: 50–60% 60–70%
U.S. senator before election
Robert D. Carey
Republican
Elected U.S. Senator
Harry Schwartz
Democratic

The 1936 United States Senate election in Wyoming was held on November 3, 1936. First-term Republican Senator Robert D. Carey ran for re-election. In a rematch of the 1930 race, he once again faced Harry Schwartz, who had since been elected to the State Senate. Carey's fortunes turned considerably from six years prior; he lost re-election to Schwartz by a decisive margin as President Franklin D. Roosevelt defeated Republican presidential nominee Alf Landon in Wyoming in a landslide.

== Democratic primary ==
=== Candidates ===
- Harry Schwartz, State Senator, 1930 Democratic nominee for the U.S. Senate
- John D. Clark, economics professor at the University of Nebraska
- J. Kirk Baldwin, State Treasurer
- Anthony V. Radalj, executive board member of the United Mine Workers
- Charles Trenary, State Senator

=== Results ===
Democratic primary
Party	Candidate	Votes	%
Democratic	Harry Schwartz	12,308	39.18%
Democratic	John D. Clark	7,400	23.56%
Democratic	J. Kirk Baldwin	7,073	22.52%
Democratic	Anthony V. Radalj	3,235	10.30%
Democratic	Charles Trenary	1,397	4.45%
Total votes		31,413	100.00%

== Republican primary ==
=== Candidates ===
- Robert D. Carey, incumbent U.S. Senator
- A. F. Brubaker, rancher

=== Results ===
Republican primary
Party	Candidate	Votes	%
Republican	Robert D. Carey (inc.)	25,152	72.44%
Republican	A. F. Brubaker	9,571	27.56%
Total votes		34,723	100.00%

== General election ==
=== Results ===
1936 United States Senate election in Wyoming
Party	Candidate	Votes	%	±%
Democratic	Harry Schwartz	53,919	53.83%	+12.87%
Republican	Robert D. Carey (inc.)	45,483	45.40%	−13.64%
Union	George E. Geier	682	0.68%	—
Communist	Merton Willer	88	0.09%	—
Majority		8,436	8.42%	−9.67%
Turnout		100,172		
Democratic gain from Republican				
