= Senator Kissel =

Senator Kissel may refer to:

- John Kissel (New York politician) (1864–1938), New York State Senate
- John Kissel (Connecticut politician) (born 1959), Connecticut State Senate
