= Harry Schwartz (politician) =

American politician (1869–1955)

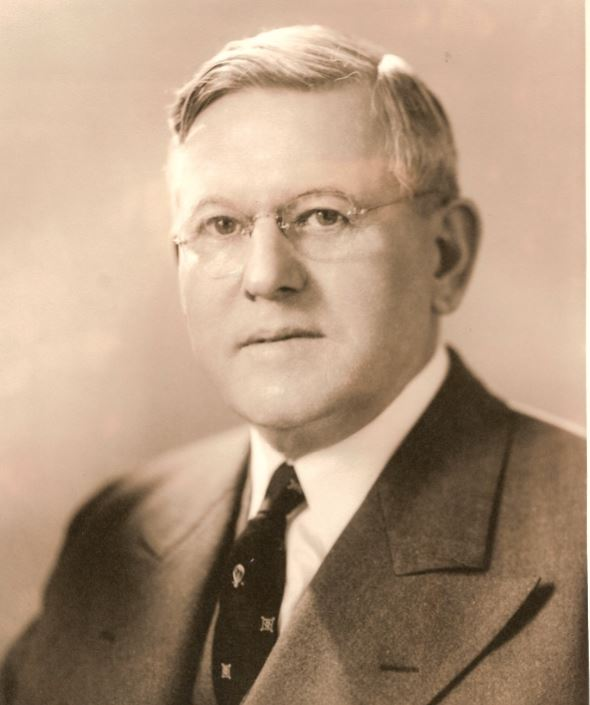

United States Senator from Wyoming
- In office January 3, 1937 – January 3, 1943
- Preceded by: Robert D. Carey
- Succeeded by: Edward V. Robertson

Member of the Wyoming Senate from Natrona County
- In office January 10, 1933 – 1935
- Preceded by: Clifford A. Miller
- Succeeded by: Charles S. Bream

Member of the South Dakota House of Representatives from Minnehaha County
- In office 1897–1899 Serving with J. S. Kirk, Henry Aulwes, A. G. Risty, W. O. Colton
- Preceded by: John A. Egge, W. A. Crooks, Charles F. Austin, Thomas McKinnon, George A. Wheeler,
- Succeeded by: A. G. Risty, C. T. Austin, John F. Sophy, J. M. Woodruff, C. W. Knodt

Personal details
- Born: May 18, 1869 Fort Recovery, Ohio, U.S.
- Died: April 24, 1955 (aged 85) Casper, Wyoming, U.S.
- Party: Democratic
- Spouse: Eliza Bowie Mathews (1891–1978)

Henry Herman Schwartz (May 18, 1869 – April 24, 1955), known as Harry or H. H. Schwartz, was an American politician who served as a U.S. senator from Wyoming. He was a member of the Democratic Party.

== Early life and education ==
Schwartz was born on a farm near Fort Recovery, Ohio, and was educated in the public schools of Mercer County and Cincinnati, Ohio. Schwartz engaged in the newspaper business at Fort Recovery from 1892 to 1894 and at Sioux Falls, South Dakota, from 1894 to 1896. Schwartz studied law, was admitted to the bar in 1895, and commenced practice in Sioux Falls.

== Political career ==
Harry Schwartz with Wyoming map

Schwartz's political career started in the South Dakota House of Representatives, serving from 1897 to 1899, where he was elected on the Fusion ticket. (Note: The Fusion ticket was a collaboration between Populists, Free Silver Republicans, and Democrats.) He served as chief of the field division of the United States General Land Office at Spokane, Washington, and Helena, Montana, from 1897 to 1907. Schwartz was special assistant to the Attorney General in 1907; and chief of field service, General Land Office in Washington, D.C., from 1907 to 1910.

In 1915, Schwartz moved to Casper, Wyoming, with wife Eliza Bowie Mathews. He served as president of the Casper Board of Education and the Natrona County High School Board from 1928 to 1934. Schwartz was an unsuccessful candidate for election to the United States Senate in 1930. He served as a member of the Wyoming state Senate from 1933 to 1935.

=== U.S. Senate ===
Schwartz was elected as a Democrat to the U.S. Senate in 1936 and served from January 3, 1937 to January 3, 1943. He was an unsuccessful candidate for reelection in 1942.

During his term as a U.S. Senator, Harry Schwartz played a key role in opening the door to black military pilots in World War II. In 1939, Public Law 18 appropriated funds to expand pilot training, and Schwartz was able to add an amendment to required some aviation equipment be loaned to schools for the training of black military pilots. When the War Department and the Army Air Corps (AAC) did not follow through on this amendment, Schwartz made visits to General Henry H. Arnold and others to demand that black pilots be trained.

During his term, Schwartz was chairman of the Committee on Pensions (Seventy-seventh Congress). He was appointed by President Franklin D. Roosevelt to the National Mediation Board, serving from 1943 to 1947.

== Life after politics ==
He resumed the practice of law in Casper, Wyoming, until his death there on April 24, 1955. He was interred in Highland Cemetery.

== Notes ==
Party political offices
Preceded by Robert R. Rose	Democratic nominee for U.S. Senator from Wyoming (Class 2); 1930, 1936, 1942	Succeeded by Lester C. Hunt
U.S. Senate
Preceded by Robert D. Carey	U.S. senator (Class 2) from Wyoming; 1937-1943	Succeeded by Edward V. Robertson
