= Charles B. Law =

American politician (1872–1929)

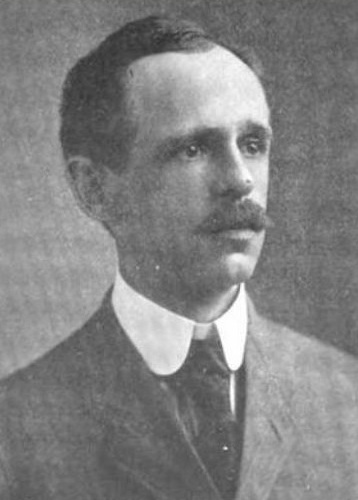
- Law in 1908

Member of the U.S. House of Representatives from New York's 4th district
- In office March 4, 1905 – March 3, 1911
- Preceded by: Frank E. Wilson
- Succeeded by: Frank E. Wilson

Personal details
- Born: Charles Blakeslee Law; February 5, 1872 Hannibal, New York, U.S.
- Died: September 15, 1929 (aged 57) Kattskill Bay, New York, U.S.
- Resting place: Maple Grove Cemetery, Jordan, New York, U.S.
- Party: Republican
- Education: Amherst College; Cornell University
- Occupation: Politician, lawyer, judge

Charles Blakeslee Law (February 5, 1872 – September 15, 1929) was a U.S. representative from New York.

== Biography ==
Born in Hannibal, New York, Law attended the public schools and graduated from Colgate Academy in Hamilton, New York in 1891. In 1895 he graduated from Amherst College in Amherst, Massachusetts. Law studied law with an attorney in Rome, New York and at Cornell Law School in Ithaca, New York.

He was admitted to the bar in Rochester, New York, in 1897. In 1898, Law moved to Brooklyn, New York where he commenced the practice of law.

Law was elected as a Republican to the Fifty-ninth, Sixtieth, and Sixty-first Congresses (March 4, 1905 – March 3, 1911). He served as chairman of the Committee on War Claims (Sixty-first Congress). He was an unsuccessful candidate for reelection in 1910.

He resumed the practice of law in Brooklyn. From 1912 to 1913, Law served as Sheriff of Kings County, New York in 1912 and 1913.

Law was a Judge of Brooklyn's Municipal Court from January 1, 1916, to January 1, 1926.

After leaving the bench he resumed the practice of law in Brooklyn and was involved in banking and insurance as president of the Mortgage Title and Guarantee Company.

== Death and burial ==
Law died while swimming at his summer home on Kattskill Bay, near Lake George, New York, on September 15, 1929. He was interred in Maple Grove Cemetery in his wife's hometown, Jordan, New York.

U.S. House of Representatives
Preceded by Frank E. Wilson	Member of the U.S. House of Representatives from New York's 4th congressional district 1905–1911	Succeeded by Frank E. Wilson
