= John MacCrate =

American politician (1885–1976)

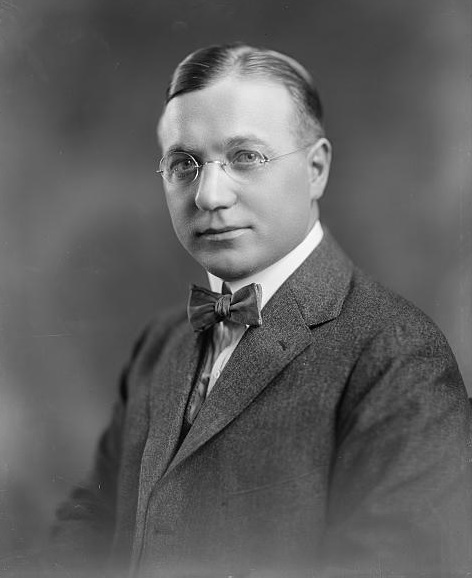

Member of the U.S. House of Representatives from New York's 3rd district
- In office March 4, 1919 – December 30, 1920
- Preceded by: Joseph V. Flynn
- Succeeded by: John Kissel

Personal details
- Born: March 29, 1885 Dumbarton, Scotland
- Died: June 9, 1976 (aged 91) New York City, U.S.
- Resting place: Mount Olivet Cemetery, New York City, U.S.
- Party: Republican
- Education: New York University
- Occupation: Politician, lawyer, judge

John MacCrate (March 29, 1885 in Dumbarton, Scotland – June 9, 1976 in Brooklyn, New York) was a lawyer, a politician, serving as a U.S. representative from New York, and a justice of the New York Supreme Court.

He migrated with his mother to the United States in 1893 and settled in the Greenpoint neighborhood of Brooklyn, New York, where his father had provided a home. He attended the public schools and the Commercial High School in Brooklyn. He graduated from the law department of New York University in 1906 and was admitted to the bar the same year and commenced practice in New York City.

He was a delegate to the Republican National Conventions in 1916 and 1920. He was nominated in the primaries by both the Republican and Democratic Parties and was elected as a Republican to the 66th United States Congress, and served from March 4, 1919 to December 30, 1920, when he resigned.

He was elected justice of the Supreme Court of the State of New York in 1920 and reelected in 1934 and 1948. He served in the appellate division of the Supreme Court until December 31, 1955, when he reached age limit. He was official referee, New York State Supreme Court, in 1956, 1957, and June 1958.

MacCrate was for many years a parishioner at the Greenpoint Methodist Church. He died in Brooklyn, New York, June 9, 1976, and was interred in Mount Olivet Cemetery, Queens, New York.

== Notes ==
U.S. House of Representatives
Preceded by Joseph V. Flynn	Member of the U.S. House of Representatives from New York's 3rd congressional district March 4, 1919 – December 30, 1920	Succeeded by John Kissel
