= 1942 United States Senate election in Wyoming =

- November 3, 1942
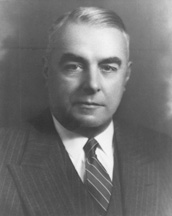

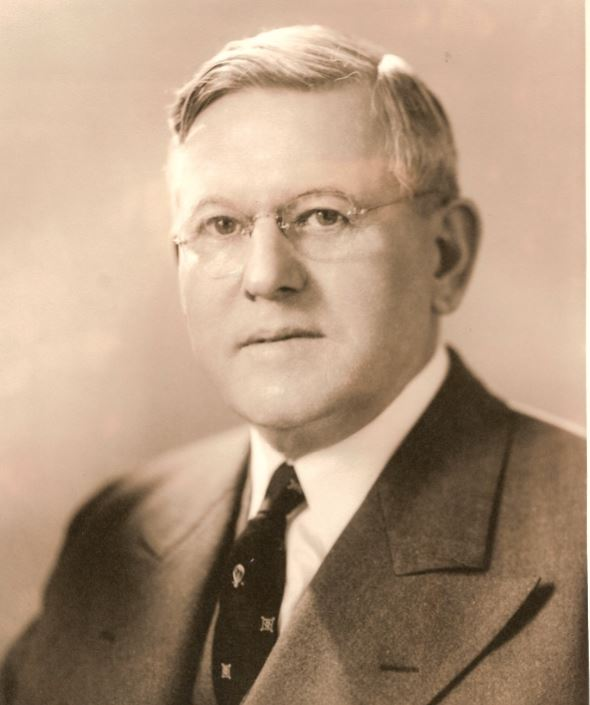
Nominee	Edward V. Robertson	Harry Schwartz
Party	Republican	Democratic
Popular vote	41,486	34,503
Percentage	54.59%	45.41%
- County results Robertson: 50–60% 60–70% 70–80% Schwartz: 50–60% 60–70%
U.S. senator before election
Harry Schwartz
Democratic
Elected U.S. Senator
Edward V. Robertson
Republican

The 1942 United States Senate election in Wyoming was held on November 3, 1942. Democratic Senator Harry Schwartz ran for re-election to his second term. He was challenged by businessman Edward V. Robertson, who emerged from a close and hotly contested Republican primary as the narrow winner. Aided in part by the national swing toward Republicans in 1942, Robertson defeated Schwartz for re-election by a decisive margin.

== Democratic primary ==
=== Candidates ===
- Harry Schwartz, incumbent U.S. Senator

=== Results ===
Democratic primary
Party	Candidate	Votes	%
Democratic	Harry Schwartz (inc.)	19,838	100.00%
Total votes		19,838	100.00%

== Republican primary ==
=== Candidates ===
- Edward V. Robertson, businessman
- Arthur G. Crane, former President of the University of Wyoming
- Tim McCoy, actor
- Walter A. Muir, former Mayor of Rock Springs
- Ralph R. Crow, former State Representative, 1940 Republican candidate for the U.S. Senate
- Alonzo M. Clark, former Governor of Wyoming

=== Results ===
Republican primary
Party	Candidate	Votes	%
Republican	Edward V. Robertson	8,128	27.77%
Republican	A. G. Crane	7,614	26.02%
Republican	Tim McCoy	6,854	23.42%
Republican	Walter A. Muir	3,467	11.85%
Republican	Ralph R. Crow	1,796	6.14%
Republican	Alonzo M. Clark	1,408	4.81%
Total votes		29,267	100.00%

== General election ==
=== Results ===
1942 United States Senate election in Wyoming
Party	Candidate	Votes	%	±%
Republican	Edward V. Robertson	41,486	54.59%	+9.19%
Democratic	Harry Schwartz (inc.)	45,483	45.41%	−8.42%
Majority		6,983	9.19%	+0.77%
Turnout		75,989		
Republican gain from Democratic				
