= Edward V. Robertson =

American politician (1881–1963)

Edward Robertson
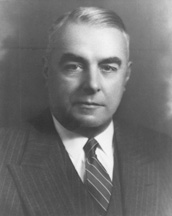

United States Senator from Wyoming
- In office January 3, 1943 – January 3, 1949
- Preceded by: Henry H. Schwartz
- Succeeded by: Lester C. Hunt

Personal details
- Born: Edward Vivian Robertson; May 27, 1881 Cardiff, United Kingdom
- Died: April 15, 1963 (aged 81) Pendleton, Oregon, U.S.
- Party: Republican

Military service
- Branch/service: British Army
- Years of service: 1899–1902
- Unit: Welsh Regiment
- Battles/wars: Second Boer War

Edward Vivian Robertson (May 27, 1881 – April 15, 1963) was a British-born American politician who served as a member of the United States Senate for Wyoming from 1943 to 1949.

== Early life ==
Born in Cardiff, Wales, he served in the Third Battalion of the Welsh Regiment during the Second Boer War from 1899 to 1902. He then engaged in mechanical and electric power engineering from 1902 to 1912.

== Career ==
Robertson emigrated to the United States in 1912 and settled in Park County, Wyoming. He raised livestock and engaged in the mercantile business at Cody, Wyoming, from 1912 to 1942. He was a life trustee of Cody General Hospital and served as vice chairman of the Wyoming Republican Party from 1934 to 1935. Robertson represented Wyoming on the Republican National Committee from 1935 to 1937.

Robertson was elected as a Republican to the United States Senate in 1942 and served from January 3, 1943, to January 3, 1949. During his tenure, Robertson introduced legislation that would grant full citizenship to Native Americans. He was an unsuccessful candidate for re-election in 1948, and he retired from political and public life.

== Personal life ==
Robertson was a resident of Cody until 1958 when he moved to Pendleton, Oregon, where he died in 1963. He was interred in Mount Hope Cemetery in Baker, Oregon.

== See also ==
- List of United States senators born outside the United States

Party political offices
Preceded by Robert D. Carey	Republican nominee for U.S. Senator from Wyoming (Class 2); 1942, 1948	Succeeded by William Henry Harrison III
U.S. Senate
Preceded by Henry H. Schwartz	U.S. senator (Class 2) from Wyoming; 1943–1949; Served alongside: Joseph C. O'Mahoney	Succeeded by Lester C. Hunt
