= List of United States senators from Wyoming =

Current delegation

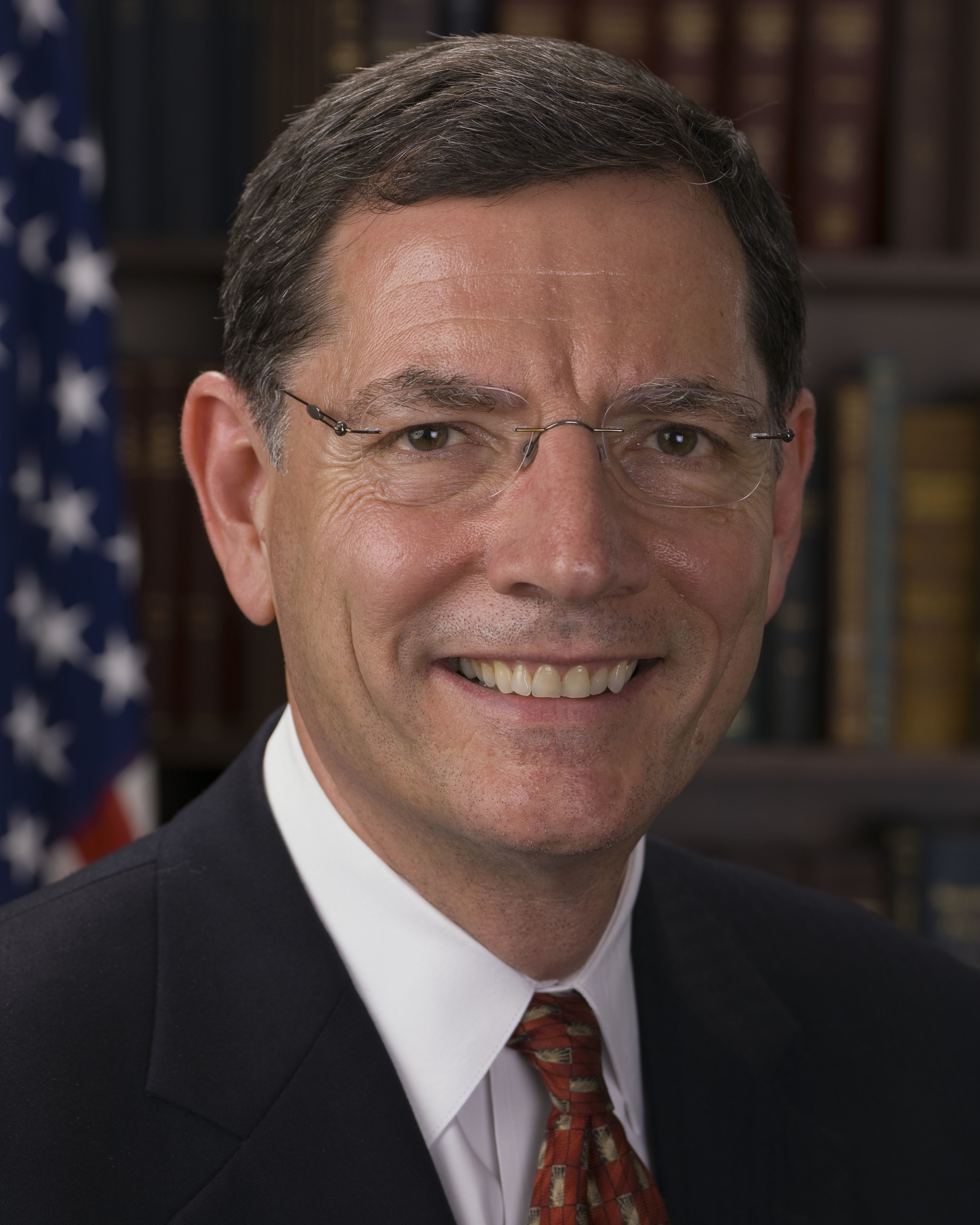
John Barrasso (R)

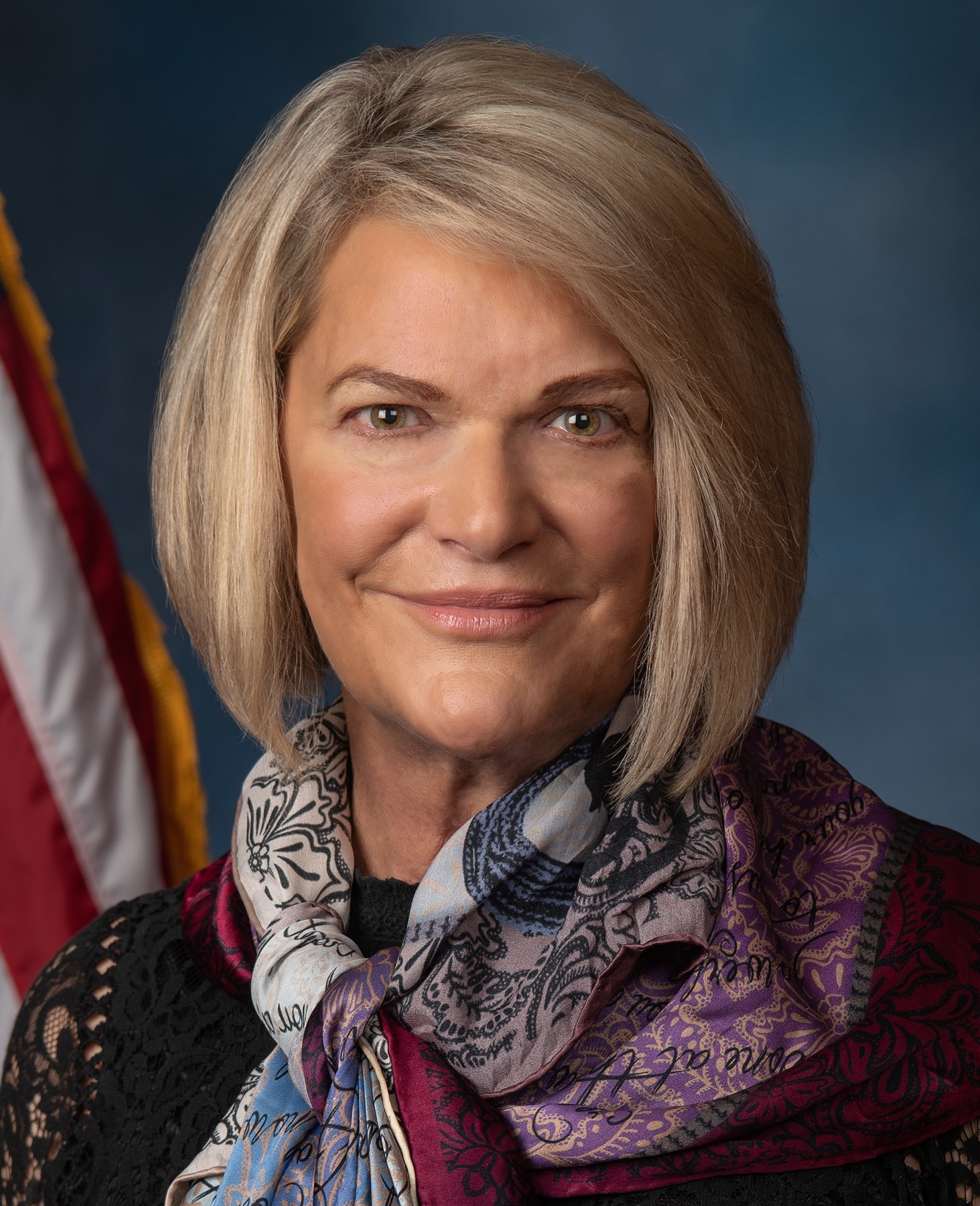
Cynthia Lummis (R)

(ordered by seniority)

Wyoming was admitted to the Union on July 10, 1890, and elects United States senators to class 1 and class 2. Its current U.S. senators are Republicans John Barrasso (serving since 2007) and Cynthia Lummis (serving since 2021). 21 people have served as a United States senator from Wyoming. Francis E. Warren was Wyoming's longest serving senator (served 1890–1893; 1895–1929), having served non-consecutively.

Since 1977, Wyoming has represented by the Republicans.

== List of senators ==
Class 1 Class 1 senators belong to the electoral cycle that most recently had regular elections in 2006, 2012, 2018, and 2024. The next election will be in 2030.						C	Class 2 Class 2 senators belong to the electoral cycle that most recently had regular elections in 2008, 2014, 2020, and 2026. The next election will be in 2032.					
#	Senator	Party	Dates in office	Electoral history	T	C	T	Electoral history	Dates in office	Party	Senator	#
Vacant			Jul 10, 1890 – Nov 18, 1890	After joining the Union, Wyoming did not elect its senators for four months.	1	51st	1	After joining the Union, Wyoming did not elect its senators for four months.	Jul 10, 1890 – Nov 15, 1890	Vacant		
1	Francis E. Warren (Cheyenne)	Republican	Nov 18, 1890 – Mar 3, 1893	Elected in 1890. Lost re-election.	1	51st	1	Elected in 1890. Lost re-election.	Nov 15, 1890 – Mar 3, 1895	Republican	Joseph M. Carey (Cheyenne)	1
1	Francis E. Warren (Cheyenne)	Republican	Nov 18, 1890 – Mar 3, 1893	Elected in 1890. Lost re-election.	1	52nd	1	Elected in 1890. Lost re-election.	Nov 15, 1890 – Mar 3, 1895	Republican	Joseph M. Carey (Cheyenne)	1
Vacant			Mar 4, 1893 – Jan 23, 1895		2	53rd	1	Elected in 1890. Lost re-election.	Nov 15, 1890 – Mar 3, 1895	Republican	Joseph M. Carey (Cheyenne)	1
2	Clarence D. Clark (Evanston)	Republican	Jan 23, 1895 – Mar 3, 1917	Elected to finish vacant term.	2	53rd	1	Elected in 1890. Lost re-election.	Nov 15, 1890 – Mar 3, 1895	Republican	Joseph M. Carey (Cheyenne)	1
2	Clarence D. Clark (Evanston)	Republican	Jan 23, 1895 – Mar 3, 1917	Elected to finish vacant term.	2	54th	2	Elected in 1895.	Mar 4, 1895 – Nov 24, 1929	Republican	Francis E. Warren (Cheyenne)	2
2	Clarence D. Clark (Evanston)	Republican	Jan 23, 1895 – Mar 3, 1917	Elected to finish vacant term.	2	55th	2	Elected in 1895.	Mar 4, 1895 – Nov 24, 1929	Republican	Francis E. Warren (Cheyenne)	2
2	Clarence D. Clark (Evanston)	Republican	Jan 23, 1895 – Mar 3, 1917	Re-elected in 1899.	3	56th	2	Elected in 1895.	Mar 4, 1895 – Nov 24, 1929	Republican	Francis E. Warren (Cheyenne)	2
2	Clarence D. Clark (Evanston)	Republican	Jan 23, 1895 – Mar 3, 1917	Re-elected in 1899.	3	57th	3	Re-elected in 1901.	Mar 4, 1895 – Nov 24, 1929	Republican	Francis E. Warren (Cheyenne)	2
2	Clarence D. Clark (Evanston)	Republican	Jan 23, 1895 – Mar 3, 1917	Re-elected in 1899.	3	58th	3	Re-elected in 1901.	Mar 4, 1895 – Nov 24, 1929	Republican	Francis E. Warren (Cheyenne)	2
2	Clarence D. Clark (Evanston)	Republican	Jan 23, 1895 – Mar 3, 1917	Re-elected in 1905.	4	59th	3	Re-elected in 1901.	Mar 4, 1895 – Nov 24, 1929	Republican	Francis E. Warren (Cheyenne)	2
2	Clarence D. Clark (Evanston)	Republican	Jan 23, 1895 – Mar 3, 1917	Re-elected in 1905.	4	60th	4	Re-elected in 1907.	Mar 4, 1895 – Nov 24, 1929	Republican	Francis E. Warren (Cheyenne)	2
2	Clarence D. Clark (Evanston)	Republican	Jan 23, 1895 – Mar 3, 1917	Re-elected in 1905.	4	61st	4	Re-elected in 1907.	Mar 4, 1895 – Nov 24, 1929	Republican	Francis E. Warren (Cheyenne)	2
2	Clarence D. Clark (Evanston)	Republican	Jan 23, 1895 – Mar 3, 1917	Re-elected in 1911. Lost re-election.	5	62nd	4	Re-elected in 1907.	Mar 4, 1895 – Nov 24, 1929	Republican	Francis E. Warren (Cheyenne)	2
2	Clarence D. Clark (Evanston)	Republican	Jan 23, 1895 – Mar 3, 1917	Re-elected in 1911. Lost re-election.	5	63rd	5	Re-elected in 1913.	Mar 4, 1895 – Nov 24, 1929	Republican	Francis E. Warren (Cheyenne)	2
2	Clarence D. Clark (Evanston)	Republican	Jan 23, 1895 – Mar 3, 1917	Re-elected in 1911. Lost re-election.	5	64th	5	Re-elected in 1913.	Mar 4, 1895 – Nov 24, 1929	Republican	Francis E. Warren (Cheyenne)	2
3	John B. Kendrick (Sheridan)	Democratic	Mar 4, 1917 – Nov 3, 1933	Elected in 1916.	6	65th	5	Re-elected in 1913.	Mar 4, 1895 – Nov 24, 1929	Republican	Francis E. Warren (Cheyenne)	2
3	John B. Kendrick (Sheridan)	Democratic	Mar 4, 1917 – Nov 3, 1933	Elected in 1916.	6	66th	6	Re-elected in 1918.	Mar 4, 1895 – Nov 24, 1929	Republican	Francis E. Warren (Cheyenne)	2
3	John B. Kendrick (Sheridan)	Democratic	Mar 4, 1917 – Nov 3, 1933	Elected in 1916.	6	67th	6	Re-elected in 1918.	Mar 4, 1895 – Nov 24, 1929	Republican	Francis E. Warren (Cheyenne)	2
3	John B. Kendrick (Sheridan)	Democratic	Mar 4, 1917 – Nov 3, 1933	Re-elected in 1922.	7	68th	6	Re-elected in 1918.	Mar 4, 1895 – Nov 24, 1929	Republican	Francis E. Warren (Cheyenne)	2
3	John B. Kendrick (Sheridan)	Democratic	Mar 4, 1917 – Nov 3, 1933	Re-elected in 1922.	7	69th	7	Re-elected in 1924. Died.	Mar 4, 1895 – Nov 24, 1929	Republican	Francis E. Warren (Cheyenne)	2
3	John B. Kendrick (Sheridan)	Democratic	Mar 4, 1917 – Nov 3, 1933	Re-elected in 1922.	7	70th	7	Re-elected in 1924. Died.	Mar 4, 1895 – Nov 24, 1929	Republican	Francis E. Warren (Cheyenne)	2
3	John B. Kendrick (Sheridan)	Democratic	Mar 4, 1917 – Nov 3, 1933	Re-elected in 1928. Died.	8	71st	7	Re-elected in 1924. Died.	Mar 4, 1895 – Nov 24, 1929	Republican	Francis E. Warren (Cheyenne)	2
3	John B. Kendrick (Sheridan)	Democratic	Mar 4, 1917 – Nov 3, 1933	Re-elected in 1928. Died.	8	71st	7		Nov 24, 1929 – Dec 5, 1929	Vacant		
3	John B. Kendrick (Sheridan)	Democratic	Mar 4, 1917 – Nov 3, 1933	Re-elected in 1928. Died.	8	71st	7	Appointed to continue Warren's term. Retired when successor elected.	Dec 5, 1929 – Nov 20, 1930	Republican	Patrick J. Sullivan (Casper)	3
3	John B. Kendrick (Sheridan)	Democratic	Mar 4, 1917 – Nov 3, 1933	Re-elected in 1928. Died.	8	71st	7		Nov 20, 1930 – Dec 1, 1930	Vacant		
3	John B. Kendrick (Sheridan)	Democratic	Mar 4, 1917 – Nov 3, 1933	Re-elected in 1928. Died.	8	71st	7	Elected to finish Warren's term.	Dec 1, 1930 – Jan 3, 1937	Republican	Robert D. Carey (Careyhurst)	4
3	John B. Kendrick (Sheridan)	Democratic	Mar 4, 1917 – Nov 3, 1933	Re-elected in 1928. Died.	8	72nd	8	Elected to full term in 1930. Lost re-election.	Dec 1, 1930 – Jan 3, 1937	Republican	Robert D. Carey (Careyhurst)	4
3	John B. Kendrick (Sheridan)	Democratic	Mar 4, 1917 – Nov 3, 1933	Re-elected in 1928. Died.	8	73rd	8	Elected to full term in 1930. Lost re-election.	Dec 1, 1930 – Jan 3, 1937	Republican	Robert D. Carey (Careyhurst)	4
Vacant			Nov 3, 1933 – Dec 18, 1933		8	73rd	8	Elected to full term in 1930. Lost re-election.	Dec 1, 1930 – Jan 3, 1937	Republican	Robert D. Carey (Careyhurst)	4
4	Joseph C. O'Mahoney (Cheyenne)	Democratic	Dec 18, 1933 – Jan 3, 1953	Appointed to continue Kendrick's term. Elected in 1934 to finish Kendrick's term.	8	73rd	8	Elected to full term in 1930. Lost re-election.	Dec 1, 1930 – Jan 3, 1937	Republican	Robert D. Carey (Careyhurst)	4
4	Joseph C. O'Mahoney (Cheyenne)	Democratic	Dec 18, 1933 – Jan 3, 1953	Elected in 1934.	9	74th	8	Elected to full term in 1930. Lost re-election.	Dec 1, 1930 – Jan 3, 1937	Republican	Robert D. Carey (Careyhurst)	4
4	Joseph C. O'Mahoney (Cheyenne)	Democratic	Dec 18, 1933 – Jan 3, 1953	Elected in 1934.	9	75th	9	Elected in 1936. Lost re-election.	Jan 3, 1937 – Jan 3, 1943	Democratic	Harry Schwartz (Casper)	5
4	Joseph C. O'Mahoney (Cheyenne)	Democratic	Dec 18, 1933 – Jan 3, 1953	Elected in 1934.	9	76th	9	Elected in 1936. Lost re-election.	Jan 3, 1937 – Jan 3, 1943	Democratic	Harry Schwartz (Casper)	5
4	Joseph C. O'Mahoney (Cheyenne)	Democratic	Dec 18, 1933 – Jan 3, 1953	Re-elected in 1940.	10	77th	9	Elected in 1936. Lost re-election.	Jan 3, 1937 – Jan 3, 1943	Democratic	Harry Schwartz (Casper)	5
4	Joseph C. O'Mahoney (Cheyenne)	Democratic	Dec 18, 1933 – Jan 3, 1953	Re-elected in 1940.	10	78th	10	Elected in 1942. Lost re-election.	Jan 3, 1943 – Jan 3, 1949	Republican	Edward V. Robertson (Cody)	6
4	Joseph C. O'Mahoney (Cheyenne)	Democratic	Dec 18, 1933 – Jan 3, 1953	Re-elected in 1940.	10	79th	10	Elected in 1942. Lost re-election.	Jan 3, 1943 – Jan 3, 1949	Republican	Edward V. Robertson (Cody)	6
4	Joseph C. O'Mahoney (Cheyenne)	Democratic	Dec 18, 1933 – Jan 3, 1953	Re-elected in 1946. Lost re-election.	11	80th	10	Elected in 1942. Lost re-election.	Jan 3, 1943 – Jan 3, 1949	Republican	Edward V. Robertson (Cody)	6
4	Joseph C. O'Mahoney (Cheyenne)	Democratic	Dec 18, 1933 – Jan 3, 1953	Re-elected in 1946. Lost re-election.	11	81st	11	Elected in 1948. Died.	Jan 3, 1949 – Jun 19, 1954	Democratic	Lester C. Hunt (Lander)	7
4	Joseph C. O'Mahoney (Cheyenne)	Democratic	Dec 18, 1933 – Jan 3, 1953	Re-elected in 1946. Lost re-election.	11	82nd	11	Elected in 1948. Died.	Jan 3, 1949 – Jun 19, 1954	Democratic	Lester C. Hunt (Lander)	7
5	Frank A. Barrett (Lusk)	Republican	Jan 3, 1953 – Jan 3, 1959	Elected in 1952. Lost re-election.	12	83rd	11	Elected in 1948. Died.	Jan 3, 1949 – Jun 19, 1954	Democratic	Lester C. Hunt (Lander)	7
5	Frank A. Barrett (Lusk)	Republican	Jan 3, 1953 – Jan 3, 1959	Elected in 1952. Lost re-election.	12	83rd	11		Jun 19, 1954 – Jun 24, 1954	Vacant		
5	Frank A. Barrett (Lusk)	Republican	Jan 3, 1953 – Jan 3, 1959	Elected in 1952. Lost re-election.	12	83rd	11	Appointed to continue Hunt's term. Retired when successor elected.	Jun 24, 1954 – Nov 28, 1954	Republican	Edward D. Crippa (Rock Springs)	8
5	Frank A. Barrett (Lusk)	Republican	Jan 3, 1953 – Jan 3, 1959	Elected in 1952. Lost re-election.	12	83rd	11	Elected in 1954 to finish Hunt's term.	Nov 29, 1954 – Jan 3, 1961	Democratic	Joseph C. O'Mahoney (Cheyenne)	9
5	Frank A. Barrett (Lusk)	Republican	Jan 3, 1953 – Jan 3, 1959	Elected in 1952. Lost re-election.	12	84th	12	Elected to full term in 1954. Retired.	Nov 29, 1954 – Jan 3, 1961	Democratic	Joseph C. O'Mahoney (Cheyenne)	9
5	Frank A. Barrett (Lusk)	Republican	Jan 3, 1953 – Jan 3, 1959	Elected in 1952. Lost re-election.	12	85th	12	Elected to full term in 1954. Retired.	Nov 29, 1954 – Jan 3, 1961	Democratic	Joseph C. O'Mahoney (Cheyenne)	9
6	Gale W. McGee (Laramie)	Democratic	Jan 3, 1959 – Jan 3, 1977	Elected in 1958.	13	86th	12	Elected to full term in 1954. Retired.	Nov 29, 1954 – Jan 3, 1961	Democratic	Joseph C. O'Mahoney (Cheyenne)	9
6	Gale W. McGee (Laramie)	Democratic	Jan 3, 1959 – Jan 3, 1977	Elected in 1958.	13	87th	13	Appointed to begin the term of Keith Thomson (R), who was elected in 1960 but died before the Congress began. Lost election to finish Thomson's term.	Jan 3, 1961 – Nov 6, 1962	Democratic	Joe Hickey (Cheyenne)	10
6	Gale W. McGee (Laramie)	Democratic	Jan 3, 1959 – Jan 3, 1977	Elected in 1958.	13	87th	13	Elected to finish Thomson's term. Retired.	Nov 7, 1962 – Jan 3, 1967	Republican	Milward Simpson (Cody)	11
6	Gale W. McGee (Laramie)	Democratic	Jan 3, 1959 – Jan 3, 1977	Elected in 1958.	13	88th	13	Elected to finish Thomson's term. Retired.	Nov 7, 1962 – Jan 3, 1967	Republican	Milward Simpson (Cody)	11
6	Gale W. McGee (Laramie)	Democratic	Jan 3, 1959 – Jan 3, 1977	Re-elected in 1964.	14	89th	13	Elected to finish Thomson's term. Retired.	Nov 7, 1962 – Jan 3, 1967	Republican	Milward Simpson (Cody)	11
6	Gale W. McGee (Laramie)	Democratic	Jan 3, 1959 – Jan 3, 1977	Re-elected in 1964.	14	90th	14	Elected in 1966.	Jan 3, 1967 – Dec 31, 1978	Republican	Clifford Hansen (Jackson)	12
6	Gale W. McGee (Laramie)	Democratic	Jan 3, 1959 – Jan 3, 1977	Re-elected in 1964.	14	91st	14	Elected in 1966.	Jan 3, 1967 – Dec 31, 1978	Republican	Clifford Hansen (Jackson)	12
6	Gale W. McGee (Laramie)	Democratic	Jan 3, 1959 – Jan 3, 1977	Re-elected in 1970. Lost re-election.	15	92nd	14	Elected in 1966.	Jan 3, 1967 – Dec 31, 1978	Republican	Clifford Hansen (Jackson)	12
6	Gale W. McGee (Laramie)	Democratic	Jan 3, 1959 – Jan 3, 1977	Re-elected in 1970. Lost re-election.	15	93rd	15	Re-elected in 1972. Retired and resigned early to give successor preferential seniority.	Jan 3, 1967 – Dec 31, 1978	Republican	Clifford Hansen (Jackson)	12
6	Gale W. McGee (Laramie)	Democratic	Jan 3, 1959 – Jan 3, 1977	Re-elected in 1970. Lost re-election.	15	94th	15	Re-elected in 1972. Retired and resigned early to give successor preferential seniority.	Jan 3, 1967 – Dec 31, 1978	Republican	Clifford Hansen (Jackson)	12
7	Malcolm Wallop (Big Horn)	Republican	Jan 3, 1977 – Jan 3, 1995	Elected in 1976.	16	95th	15	Re-elected in 1972. Retired and resigned early to give successor preferential seniority.	Jan 3, 1967 – Dec 31, 1978	Republican	Clifford Hansen (Jackson)	12
7	Malcolm Wallop (Big Horn)	Republican	Jan 3, 1977 – Jan 3, 1995	Elected in 1976.	16	95th	15	Appointed to finish Hansen's term, having already been elected to the next term.	Jan 1, 1979 – Jan 3, 1997	Republican	Alan Simpson (Cody)	13
7	Malcolm Wallop (Big Horn)	Republican	Jan 3, 1977 – Jan 3, 1995	Elected in 1976.	16	96th	16	Elected in 1978.	Jan 1, 1979 – Jan 3, 1997	Republican	Alan Simpson (Cody)	13
7	Malcolm Wallop (Big Horn)	Republican	Jan 3, 1977 – Jan 3, 1995	Elected in 1976.	16	97th	16	Elected in 1978.	Jan 1, 1979 – Jan 3, 1997	Republican	Alan Simpson (Cody)	13
7	Malcolm Wallop (Big Horn)	Republican	Jan 3, 1977 – Jan 3, 1995	Re-elected in 1982.	17	98th	16	Elected in 1978.	Jan 1, 1979 – Jan 3, 1997	Republican	Alan Simpson (Cody)	13
7	Malcolm Wallop (Big Horn)	Republican	Jan 3, 1977 – Jan 3, 1995	Re-elected in 1982.	17	99th	17	Re-elected in 1984.	Jan 1, 1979 – Jan 3, 1997	Republican	Alan Simpson (Cody)	13
7	Malcolm Wallop (Big Horn)	Republican	Jan 3, 1977 – Jan 3, 1995	Re-elected in 1982.	17	100th	17	Re-elected in 1984.	Jan 1, 1979 – Jan 3, 1997	Republican	Alan Simpson (Cody)	13
7	Malcolm Wallop (Big Horn)	Republican	Jan 3, 1977 – Jan 3, 1995	Re-elected in 1988. Retired.	18	101st	17	Re-elected in 1984.	Jan 1, 1979 – Jan 3, 1997	Republican	Alan Simpson (Cody)	13
7	Malcolm Wallop (Big Horn)	Republican	Jan 3, 1977 – Jan 3, 1995	Re-elected in 1988. Retired.	18	102nd	18	Re-elected in 1990. Retired.	Jan 1, 1979 – Jan 3, 1997	Republican	Alan Simpson (Cody)	13
7	Malcolm Wallop (Big Horn)	Republican	Jan 3, 1977 – Jan 3, 1995	Re-elected in 1988. Retired.	18	103rd	18	Re-elected in 1990. Retired.	Jan 1, 1979 – Jan 3, 1997	Republican	Alan Simpson (Cody)	13
8	Craig Thomas (Casper)	Republican	Jan 3, 1995 – Jun 4, 2007	Elected in 1994.	19	104th	18	Re-elected in 1990. Retired.	Jan 1, 1979 – Jan 3, 1997	Republican	Alan Simpson (Cody)	13
8	Craig Thomas (Casper)	Republican	Jan 3, 1995 – Jun 4, 2007	Elected in 1994.	19	105th	19	Elected in 1996.	Jan 3, 1997 – Jan 3, 2021	Republican	Mike Enzi (Gillette)	14
8	Craig Thomas (Casper)	Republican	Jan 3, 1995 – Jun 4, 2007	Elected in 1994.	19	106th	19	Elected in 1996.	Jan 3, 1997 – Jan 3, 2021	Republican	Mike Enzi (Gillette)	14
8	Craig Thomas (Casper)	Republican	Jan 3, 1995 – Jun 4, 2007	Re-elected in 2000.	20	107th	19	Elected in 1996.	Jan 3, 1997 – Jan 3, 2021	Republican	Mike Enzi (Gillette)	14
8	Craig Thomas (Casper)	Republican	Jan 3, 1995 – Jun 4, 2007	Re-elected in 2000.	20	108th	20	Re-elected in 2002.	Jan 3, 1997 – Jan 3, 2021	Republican	Mike Enzi (Gillette)	14
8	Craig Thomas (Casper)	Republican	Jan 3, 1995 – Jun 4, 2007	Re-elected in 2000.	20	109th	20	Re-elected in 2002.	Jan 3, 1997 – Jan 3, 2021	Republican	Mike Enzi (Gillette)	14
8	Craig Thomas (Casper)	Republican	Jan 3, 1995 – Jun 4, 2007	Re-elected in 2006. Died.	21	110th	20	Re-elected in 2002.	Jan 3, 1997 – Jan 3, 2021	Republican	Mike Enzi (Gillette)	14
Vacant			Jun 4, 2007 – Jun 22, 2007		21	110th	20	Re-elected in 2002.	Jan 3, 1997 – Jan 3, 2021	Republican	Mike Enzi (Gillette)	14
9	John Barrasso (Casper)	Republican	Jun 22, 2007 – present	Appointed to continue Thomas's term. Elected in 2008 to finish Thomas's term.	21	110th	20	Re-elected in 2002.	Jan 3, 1997 – Jan 3, 2021	Republican	Mike Enzi (Gillette)	14
9	John Barrasso (Casper)	Republican	Jun 22, 2007 – present	Appointed to continue Thomas's term. Elected in 2008 to finish Thomas's term.	21	111th	21	Re-elected in 2008.	Jan 3, 1997 – Jan 3, 2021	Republican	Mike Enzi (Gillette)	14
9	John Barrasso (Casper)	Republican	Jun 22, 2007 – present	Appointed to continue Thomas's term. Elected in 2008 to finish Thomas's term.	21	112th	21	Re-elected in 2008.	Jan 3, 1997 – Jan 3, 2021	Republican	Mike Enzi (Gillette)	14
9	John Barrasso (Casper)	Republican	Jun 22, 2007 – present	Re-elected in 2012.	22	113th	21	Re-elected in 2008.	Jan 3, 1997 – Jan 3, 2021	Republican	Mike Enzi (Gillette)	14
9	John Barrasso (Casper)	Republican	Jun 22, 2007 – present	Re-elected in 2012.	22	114th	22	Re-elected in 2014. Retired.	Jan 3, 1997 – Jan 3, 2021	Republican	Mike Enzi (Gillette)	14
9	John Barrasso (Casper)	Republican	Jun 22, 2007 – present	Re-elected in 2012.	22	115th	22	Re-elected in 2014. Retired.	Jan 3, 1997 – Jan 3, 2021	Republican	Mike Enzi (Gillette)	14
9	John Barrasso (Casper)	Republican	Jun 22, 2007 – present	Re-elected in 2018.	23	116th	22	Re-elected in 2014. Retired.	Jan 3, 1997 – Jan 3, 2021	Republican	Mike Enzi (Gillette)	14
9	John Barrasso (Casper)	Republican	Jun 22, 2007 – present	Re-elected in 2018.	23	117th	23	Elected in 2020. Retiring at the end of term.	Jan 3, 2021 – present	Republican	Cynthia Lummis (Cheyenne)	15
9	John Barrasso (Casper)	Republican	Jun 22, 2007 – present	Re-elected in 2018.	23	118th	23	Elected in 2020. Retiring at the end of term.	Jan 3, 2021 – present	Republican	Cynthia Lummis (Cheyenne)	15
9	John Barrasso (Casper)	Republican	Jun 22, 2007 – present	Re-elected in 2024.	24	119th	23	Elected in 2020. Retiring at the end of term.	Jan 3, 2021 – present	Republican	Cynthia Lummis (Cheyenne)	15
9	John Barrasso (Casper)	Republican	Jun 22, 2007 – present	Re-elected in 2024.	24	120th	24	Elected in 2026.	Taking office Jan 3, 2027	Republican	Harriet Hageman (elect) (Cheyenne)	16
9	John Barrasso (Casper)	Republican	Jun 22, 2007 – present	Re-elected in 2024.	24	121st	24	Elected in 2026.	Taking office Jan 3, 2027	Republican	Harriet Hageman (elect) (Cheyenne)	16
To be determined in the 2030 election.					25	122nd	24	Elected in 2026.	Taking office Jan 3, 2027	Republican	Harriet Hageman (elect) (Cheyenne)	16
To be determined in the 2030 election.					25	123rd	25	To be determined in the 2032 election.				

== See also ==
- List of United States representatives from Wyoming
- List of United States Senate elections in Wyoming
- Wyoming's congressional delegations
