= Joseph V. Flynn =

American politician

James Joseph V. Flynn
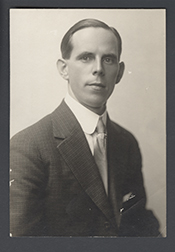

Member of the U.S. House of Representatives from New York's 3rd district
- In office March 4, 1915 – January 3, 1919
- Preceded by: Frank E. Wilson
- Succeeded by: John MacCrate

Personal details
- Born: September 2, 1883 Brooklyn, New York, US
- Died: February 6, 1940 (aged 56) Brooklyn, New York, US
- Resting place: Calvary Cemetery
- Party: Democratic Party
- Education: College of the City of New York; Brooklyn Law School of St. Lawrence University
- Occupation: Attorney

Joseph Vincent Flynn (September 2, 1883 – February 6, 1940) of Brooklyn, New York was an American lawyer and politician who served two terms as a member of the United States House of Representatives from New York from 1915 to 1919. He was a Democrat.

== Biography ==
Flynn was born in Brooklyn, New York, on September 2, 1883. He attended public schools and the Boys High School of Brooklyn. He graduated from the College of the City of New York in 1904 and from the Brooklyn Law School of St. Lawrence University in 1906; was admitted to the bar in the latter year and commenced the practice of law in New York City.

=== Congress ===
Flynn was elected as a Democrat to the Sixty-fourth and Sixty-fifth Congresses (March 4, 1915 – March 3, 1919). He was not a candidate for renomination in 1918. He resumed the practice of law in New York City. He was a delegate to the Democratic State conventions in 1925 and 1927. He resided in Brooklyn, New York, until his death there February 6, 1940 at the age of 56.

He is interred in Calvary Cemetery, Long Island City, New York.

U.S. House of Representatives
| Preceded by Frank E. Wilson | Member of the U.S. House of Representatives from New York's 3rd congressional district March 4, 1915 – March 3, 1919 | Succeeded by John MacCrate |
