= Frank E. Wilson (politician) =

American politician

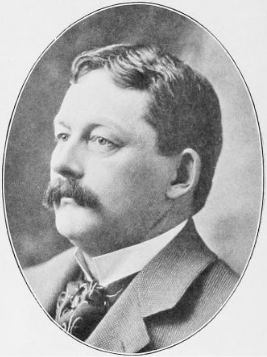

Member of the U.S. House of Representatives from New York
- In office March 4, 1899 – March 3, 1905
- Preceded by: Charles G. Bennett
- Succeeded by: Charles B. Law
- Constituency: 5th district (1899–1903); 4th district (1903–1905)
- In office March 4, 1911 – March 3, 1915
- Preceded by: Charles B. Law
- Succeeded by: Joseph V. Flynn
- Constituency: 4th district (1911–1913); 3rd district (1913–1915)

Personal details
- Born: Frank Eugene Wilson; December 22, 1857 Roxbury, New York, U.S.
- Died: July 12, 1935 (aged 77) Brooklyn, New York, U.S.
- Resting place: Roxbury Cemetery, Roxbury, New York
- Party: Democratic
- Education: Poughkeepsie Military Academy; Jefferson Medical College
- Occupation: Physician, politician

Frank Eugene Wilson (December 22, 1857 – July 12, 1935) was an American physician and politician who served five terms as a U.S. representative from New York between 1899 and 1915.

== Biography ==
Born in Roxbury, New York, Wilson attended the public schools and the Poughkeepsie Military Academy. He graduated from the Jefferson Medical College, Philadelphia, Pennsylvania, in 1882.

=== Early medical career ===
He practiced medicine in Pleasant Valley, New York, until April 1888. He moved to Brooklyn, New York, in 1888 and continued the practice of medicine. He was a senior physician, a director, and member of the board of governors of the Bushwick Hospital, and visiting physician to the Swedish Hospital, both of Brooklyn.

=== Tenure in Congress ===
Wilson was elected as a Democrat to the Fifty-sixth, Fifty-seventh, and Fifty-eighth Congresses (March 4, 1899 – March 3, 1905). He was an unsuccessful candidate for reelection in 1904 to the 59th United States Congress. He served as a delegate to the Democratic National Convention in 1900.

Wilson was elected to the Sixty-second and Sixty-third Congresses (March 4, 1911 – March 3, 1915). He was not a candidate for renomination in 1914.

=== Later career and death ===
He resumed the practice of medicine in Brooklyn, until his death at his home there on July 12, 1935. His remains were cremated and the ashes were deposited in Roxbury Cemetery, Roxbury, New York.

U.S. House of Representatives
Preceded by Charles G. Bennett	Member of the U.S. House of Representatives from New York's 5th congressional district 1899–1903	Succeeded by Edward Bassett
Preceded by Harry A. Hanbury	Member of the U.S. House of Representatives from New York's 4th congressional district 1903–1905	Succeeded by Charles B. Law
Preceded by Charles B. Law	Member of the U.S. House of Representatives from New York's 4th congressional district 1911–1913	Succeeded by Harry H. Dale
Preceded by James P. Maher	Member of the U.S. House of Representatives from New York's 3rd congressional district 1913–1915	Succeeded by Joseph V. Flynn
