= 1990 United States Senate election in Wyoming =

- November 6, 1990
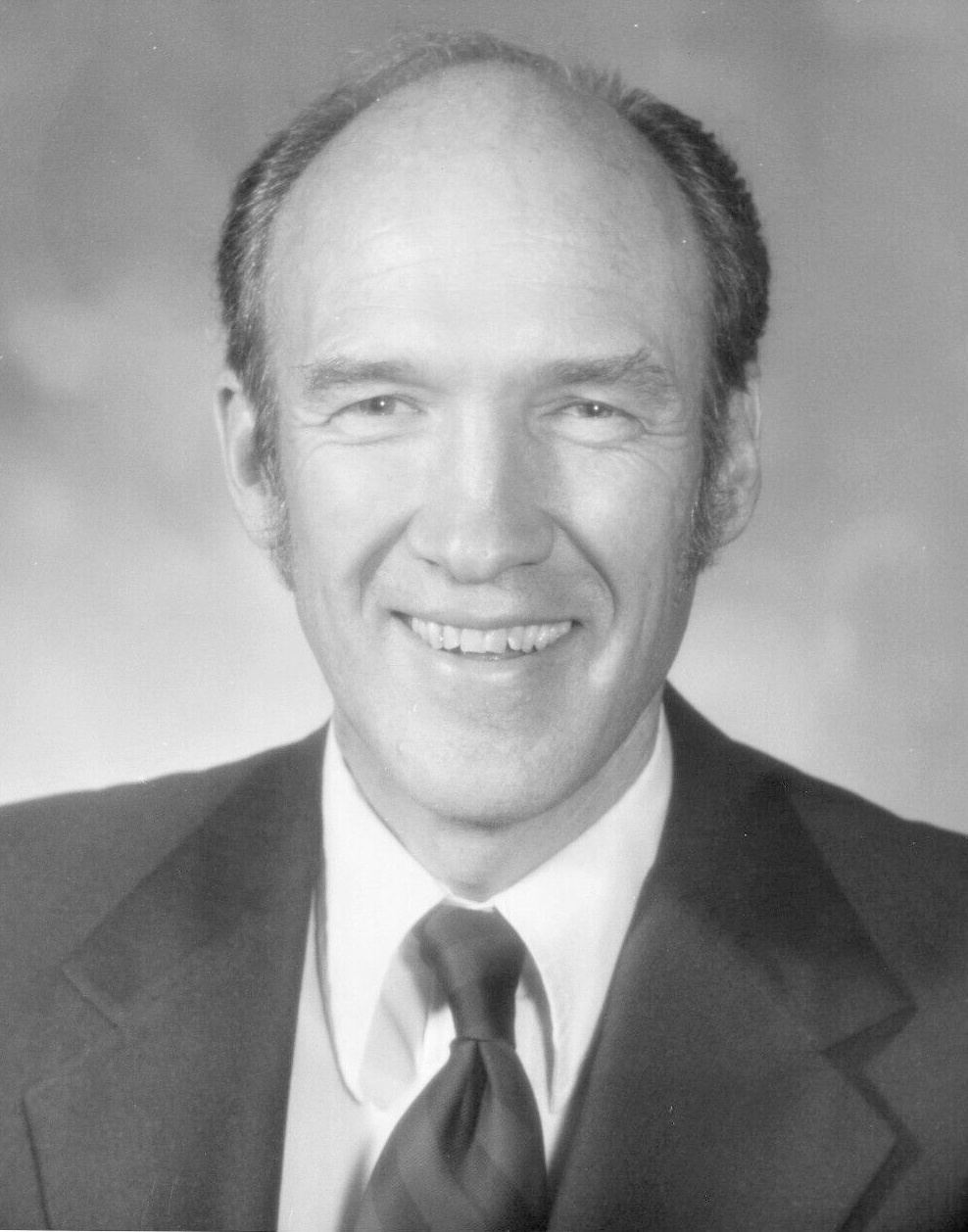

Nominee	Alan K. Simpson	Kathy Helling
Party	Republican	Democratic
Popular vote	100,784	56,848
Percentage	63.94%	36.06%
- County results Simpson: 50–60% 60–70% 70–80%
U.S. senator before election
Alan K. Simpson
Republican
Elected U.S. Senator
Alan K. Simpson
Republican

The 1990 United States Senate election in Wyoming was held November 6, 1990. Incumbent Republican U.S. Senator Alan K. Simpson was elected to a third term in office.

== Democratic primary ==
=== Candidates ===
- Dale Bulman
- Al Hamburg
- Kathy Helling, college student
- Don C. Joliffe
- Emmett Jones
- Howard O'Connor, perennial candidate from Torrington

=== Results ===
Democratic primary results
Party	Candidate	Votes	%
Democratic	Kathy Helling	12,103	35.07%
Democratic	Al Hamburg	7,196	20.85%
Democratic	Howard O'Connor	6,483	18.75%
Democratic	Emmett Jones	4,455	12.91%
Democratic	Dale Bulman	2,291	6.64%
Democratic	Don C. Joliffe	1,983	5.75%
Total votes		34,511	100.00%

== Republican primary ==
=== Candidates ===
- Douglas W. Crook
- Nora M. Lewis, candidate for Senate in 1988
- Alan K. Simpson, incumbent Senator

=== Results ===
Republican primary results
Party	Candidate	Votes	%
Republican	Alan K. Simpson (incumbent)	69,142	84.40%
Republican	Nora M. Lewis	6,577	8.03%
Republican	Douglas W. Crook	6,201	7.57%
Total votes		81,920	100.00%

== General election ==
=== Results ===
General election results
Party	Candidate	Votes	%	±%
Republican	Alan K. Simpson (incumbent)	100,784	63.94%	▼14.38
Democratic	Kathy Helling	56,848	36.06%	▲14.38
Turnout		211,077	70.88%	▼7.00
Republican hold		Swing		

== See also ==
- 1990 United States Senate elections
