= George W. Lindsay =

American politician

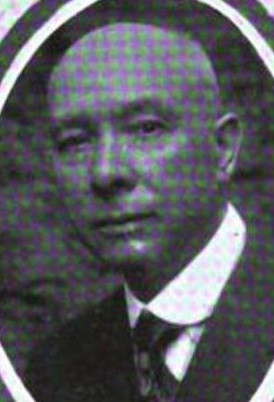
George W. Lindsay, New York Congressman

George Washington Lindsay (March 28, 1865 – March 15, 1938) was an American businessman and politician who served six terms as a United States representative from New York from 1923 to 1935. He was the son of George Henry Lindsay, who was also a U.S. representative.

== Biography ==
He was born in Brooklyn on March 28, 1865, to George Henry Lindsay. He attended the public schools, was deputy coroner of Kings County, New York from 1886 to 1892 (during which time his father was coroner) and engaged in the real estate business. He was a member of the Democratic State committee and served as leader of the assembly district from 1919 to 1934.

He was appointed as a confidential investigator in the State Insurance Department in 1914 and served until 1919. He was a member of the New York State Assembly (Kings Co., 13th D.) in 1920. He was deputy tenement-house commissioner for Brooklyn and Queens from 1921 to 1923.

=== Congress ===
Lindsay was elected as a Democrat to the Sixty-eighth and to the five succeeding Congresses, holding office from March 4, 1923 to January 3, 1935. He was an unsuccessful candidate for renomination in 1934 and resumed the real estate business.

=== Death ===
In 1938, he died in Brooklyn; interment was in Cemetery of the Evergreens.

New York State Assembly
Preceded by Morgan T. Donnelly	New York State Assembly; Kings County, 13th District; 1920	Succeeded by John J. Wackerman
U.S. House of Representatives
Preceded by John Kissel	Member of the U.S. House of Representatives from New York's 3rd congressional district 1923–1935	Succeeded by Joseph L. Pfeifer
