= 2006 United States Senate election in Wyoming =

- November 7, 2006
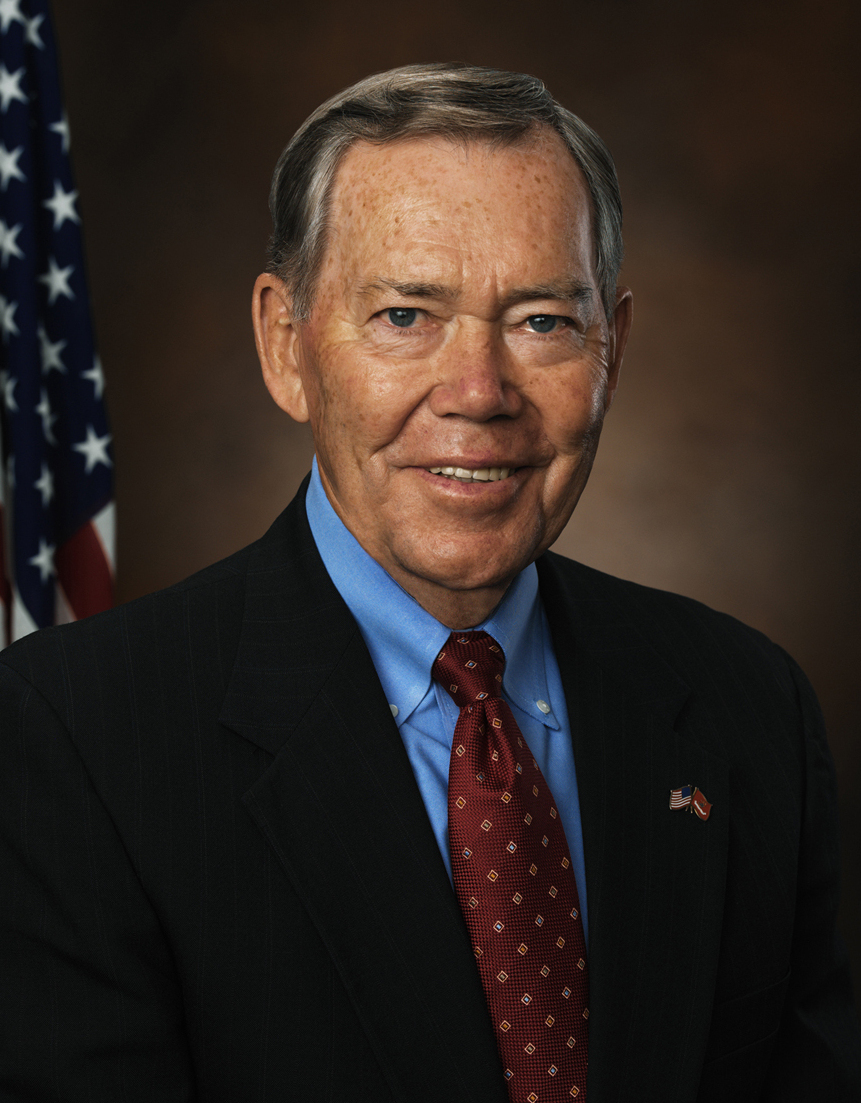

Nominee	Craig L. Thomas	Dale Groutage
Party	Republican	Democratic
Popular vote	135,174	57,761
Percentage	69.99%	29.86%
- Thomas: 50–60% 60–70% 70–80% 80–90% >90% Groutage: 50–60% 60–70% Tie: 50% No votes
U.S. senator before election
Craig L. Thomas
Republican
Elected U.S. Senator
Craig L. Thomas
Republican

The 2006 United States Senate election in Wyoming was held November 7, 2006, to elect a member of the United States Senate to represent the state of Wyoming. Republican two-term incumbent Craig Thomas defeated Democratic nominee Dale Groutage.

Primary elections were held on August 22, 2006. Thomas and Groutage secured their party's nominations unopposed.

== Republican primary ==
=== Candidates ===
==== Nominee ====
- Craig Thomas, incumbent U.S. senator (1995–2007)

=== Results ===
Republican primary results
Party	Candidate	Votes	%
Republican	Craig Thomas (incumbent)	78,211	100.00
Total votes		78,211	100.00

== Democratic primary ==
=== Candidates ===
==== Nominee ====
- Dale Groutage, engineer

=== Results ===
Democratic primary results
Party	Candidate	Votes	%
Democratic	Dale Groutage	24,924	100.00
Total votes		24,924	100.00

== Background ==
In 2006, Thomas maintained 68% favorability and was largely expected to win reelection due to Wyoming's red lean at the federal level.

== General election ==
=== Campaign ===
Despite Thomas's significant lead in the polls, Thomas agreed to a debate. An October debate was sponsored by the Casper Star-Tribune and KCWY in Casper. Thomas said the nation has made progress in its energy policy, while Groutage said the nation's energy policy has failed because Congress has done more for special interests than the people.

=== Debates ===
- Complete video of debate, October 22, 2006

=== Predictions ===
Source	Ranking	As of
The Cook Political Report	Solid R	November 6, 2006
Sabato's Crystal Ball	Safe R	November 6, 2006
Rothenberg Political Report	Safe R	November 6, 2006
Real Clear Politics	Safe R	November 6, 2006

=== Polling ===
Poll source	Date(s) administered	Sample size (Note: Key: A – all adults RV – registered voters LV – likely voters V – unclear)	Margin of error	Craig Thomas (R)	Dale Groutage (D)	Other	Undecided
Aspen Media & Market Research	October 18–25, 2006	– (LV)	± 4.0%	70%	22%	1% (Note: Refused with 1%.)	7%
Mason-Dixon Polling & Strategy	October 9–12, 2006	425 (LV)	± 4.0%	67%	26%	–	7%
Rasmussen Reports	July 6, 2006	500 (LV)	± 4.5%	59%	32%	–	9%
Rasmussen Reports	May 8, 2006	500 (LV)	± 4.5%	64%	25%	–	11%

== Results ==
General election results
Party	Candidate	Votes	%	±%
Republican	Craig L. Thomas (incumbent)	135,174	69.99%	−3.78%
Democratic	Dale Groutage	57,671	29.86%	+7.82%
	Write-ins	291	0.15%	
Majority		77,503	40.13%	−11.61%
Turnout		193,136		
Republican hold		Swing		

== See also ==
- 2006 United States elections
- 2006 Wyoming elections
