= Robert D. Carey =

American politician (1878–1937)

Robert Davis Carey
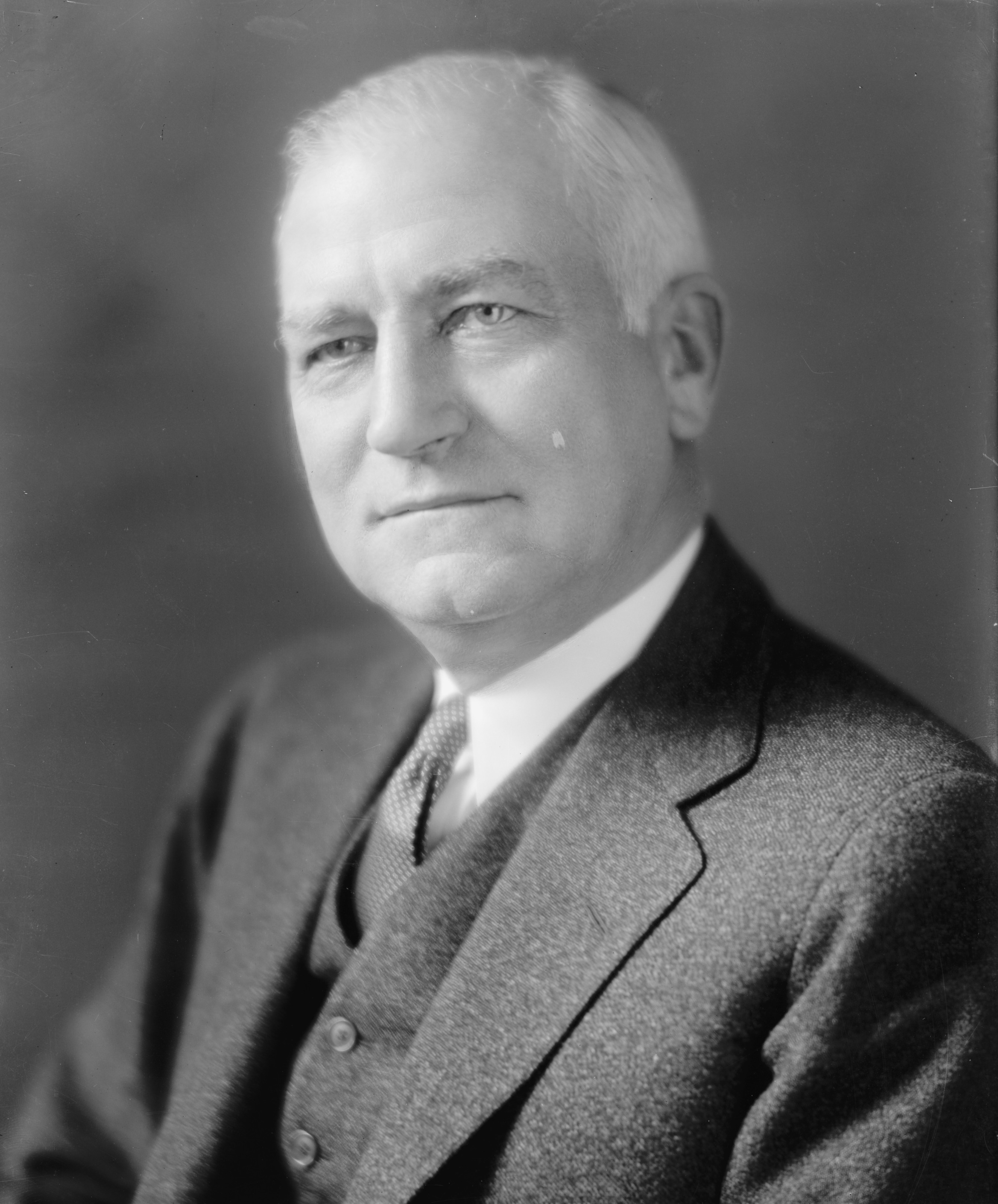

United States Senator from Wyoming
- In office December 1, 1930 – January 3, 1937
- Preceded by: Patrick J. Sullivan
- Succeeded by: Henry H. Schwartz

11th Governor of Wyoming
- In office January 6, 1919 – January 1, 1923
- Preceded by: Frank L. Houx
- Succeeded by: William B. Ross

Personal details
- Born: August 12, 1878 Cheyenne, Wyoming Territory, U.S.
- Died: January 17, 1937 (aged 58) Cheyenne, Wyoming, U.S.
- Party: Republican

Robert Davis Carey (August 12, 1878 – January 17, 1937) was an American politician from Wyoming, a state of which he served as the 11th governor and represented in the United States Senate. He was the first native-born Wyomingite to serve in either position. He was a member of the Republican Party.

== Biography ==
Robert Carey was born on August 12, 1878, to Joseph Maull Carey and Louisa David in Cheyenne in the Wyoming Territory. He attended and received an education from the public schools and Hill School in Pottstown, Pennsylvania. Carey attended college and graduated from Yale University in 1900, after which he moved to Converse County, Wyoming. Once back in Wyoming, Carey entered the livestock and agricultural businesses and took an interest in banking. He served as a member of the Progressive National Committee for Wyoming from 1912 to 1916 and chairman of the Wyoming State Highway Commission from 1917 to 1918. Carey also served as president of the Wyoming Stock Growers Association between 1917 and 1921.

In 1918, Carey was elected the 11th Governor of Wyoming, serving from 1919 to 1923. He was Wyoming's first governor to be born in the state. He was appointed by President Calvin Coolidge in 1924 to evaluate agriculture in the United States as chairman of the agricultural conference.

Carey was elected to represent Wyoming as a Republican in the United States Senate on November 4, 1930, to fill a vacancy created by the death of Francis E. Warren, and was also elected in his own right to the term commencing in March 1931. He assumed office on December 1, 1930, and served until the expiration of his term on January 3, 1937. He unsuccessfully sought re-election in 1936.

Upon leaving the Senate, Carey returned to Wyoming to re-enter the agricultural business. He died on January 17, 1937, only two weeks after he left office, in Cheyenne. He was interred in Lakeview Cemetery.

Party political offices
Preceded by Hilliard S. Ridgely	Republican nominee for Governor of Wyoming; 1918	Succeeded by John W. Hay
Preceded by Francis E. Warren	Republican nominee for U.S. Senator from Wyoming (Class 2); 1930, 1936	Succeeded by Edward V. Robertson
Political offices
Preceded by Frank L. Houx	Governor of Wyoming; January 6, 1919 – January 1, 1923	Succeeded by William Bradford Ross
Preceded by Patrick J. Sullivan	U.S. Senator (Class 2) from Wyoming; December 1, 1930 – January 3, 1937	Succeeded by Henry H. Schwartz
