= 1930 United States Senate election in Wyoming =

- November 4, 1930
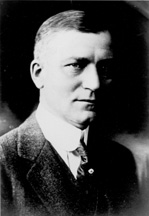

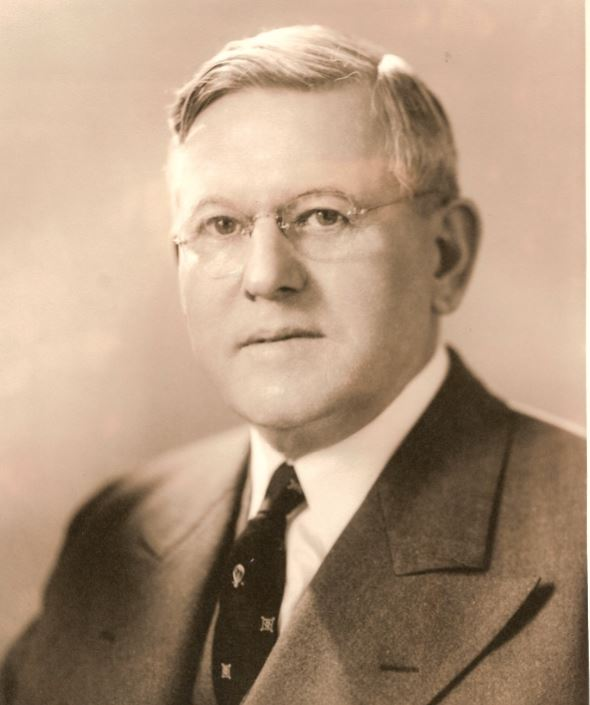
Nominee	Robert D. Carey	Harry Schwartz
Party	Republican	Democratic
Popular vote	43,626	30,259
Percentage	59.05%	40.95%
- County results Carey: 50–60% 60–70% 70–80% Schwartz: 50–60% 60–70%
U.S. senator before election
Patrick J. Sullivan
Republican
Elected U.S. Senator
Robert D. Carey
Republican

The 1930 United States Senate election in Wyoming was held on November 4, 1930. Following the death of Republican Senator Francis E. Warren, former Casper Mayor Patrick J. Sullivan was appointed to replace him. Sullivan did not seek re-election, however. Following a contested Republican primary, former Governor Robert D. Carey emerged as the nominee, and faced Democrat Harry Schwartz, an attorney from Casper and a local school board member, in the general election. Despite the strong performance by Democrats nationwide in 1930, Carey defeated Schwartz by a wide margin.

== Democratic primary ==
=== Candidates ===
- Harry Schwartz, Casper attorney, local school board member

=== Results ===
Democratic primary
Party	Candidate	Votes	%
Democratic	Harry Schwartz	9,716	100.00%
Total votes		9,716	100.00%

== Republican primary ==
=== Candidates ===
- Robert D. Carey, former governor of Wyoming
- Charles E. Winter, former U.S. Congressman from Wyoming's at-large congressional district
- William C. Deming, former chairman of the United States Civil Service Commission
- William L. Walls, former attorney general of Wyoming

=== Results ===
Republican primary
Party	Candidate	Votes	%
Republican	Robert D. Carey	19,237	45.75%
Republican	Charles E. Winter	14,707	34.97%
Republican	William C. Deming	5,036	11.98%
Republican	William L. Walls	3,071	7.30%
Total votes		42,051	100.00%

== General election ==
=== Results ===
1930 United States Senate election in Wyoming
Party	Candidate	Votes	%	±%
Republican	Robert D. Carey	43,626	59.05%	+3.86%
Democratic	Harry Schwartz	30,259	40.95%	−3.86%
Majority		13,367	18.09%	+7.73%
Turnout		73,885		
Republican hold				
