= Patrick Joseph Sullivan =

American politician (1864–1935)

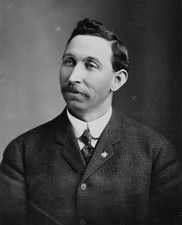

United States Senator from Wyoming
- In office December 5, 1929 – November 30, 1930
- Appointed by: Frank Emerson
- Preceded by: Francis E. Warren
- Succeeded by: Robert D. Carey

Member of the Wyoming House of Representatives
- In office 1894–1896; 1898–1900

Personal details
- Born: March 17, 1864 Bantry, County Cork, Ireland
- Died: April 8, 1935 (aged 70) Santa Barbara, California, US
- Party: Republican
- Spouse: Honora "Nan" Mahoney
- Profession: Politician

Patrick Joseph Sullivan (March 17, 1864 – April 8, 1935) was an American politician. He was the mayor of Casper, Wyoming, from 1897 to 1898 and was a Republican member of the United States Senate from Wyoming from 1929 to 1930.

== Biography ==
Sullivan was born on a farm at Kilcrohane, west of Bantry, County Cork, Ireland. He emigrated to America in 1888, landed in New York City, and moved to the Territory of Wyoming where he raised sheep in Rawlins. He moved to Casper in 1892, and became interested in banking, the production of oil, and various other enterprises.

He was a member of the Wyoming House of Representatives from 1894 until 1896, and from 1898 until 1900. He served as the mayor of Casper from 1897 until 1899. In 1912 and 1916 he was a delegate to the Republican National Convention from Wyoming. He was a member of the Republican National Committee from Wyoming in 1924.

On December 5, 1929, he was appointed as a Republican to the United States Senate to fill the vacancy caused by the death of Francis E. Warren. He served in the US Senate from December 5, 1929, to November 30, 1930, when Robert D. Carey succeeded him. He was not a candidate for the election to fill the vacancy.

Though Mr. Sullivan was a man of law and order, he did reciprocate the voluntary friendship of outlaws of his day. In particular, the Wild Bunch aka Hole in the Wall Gang (led by Butch Cassidy and Harry "Sundance Kid" Longabaugh) who respected and were friendly to Mr. Sullivan despite his stand for law and order. (Denver Post - Sunday Morning Edition, March 9, 1930)

== Death ==
Sullivan died on April 8, 1935, in Santa Barbara, California. He is interred in Highland Cemetery in Casper, Wyoming.

Political offices
Preceded by George B. McCalmont	Mayor of Casper; 1897–1899	Succeeded by W.S. Kimball
U.S. Senate
Preceded by Francis E. Warren	U.S. senator (Class 1) from Wyoming; 1929–1930	Succeeded by Robert D. Carey
