= John Kissel (New York politician) =

American politician (1864–1938)

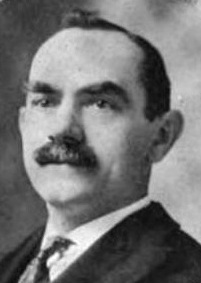

Member of the U.S. House of Representatives from New York's 3rd district
- In office March 4, 1921 – March 3, 1923
- Preceded by: John MacCrate
- Succeeded by: George W. Lindsay

Member of the New York State Senate from the 9th district
- In office January 1, 1909 – December 31, 1910
- Preceded by: Conrad Hasenflug
- Succeeded by: Felix J. Sanner

Personal details
- Born: July 31, 1864 New York City, U.S.
- Died: October 3, 1938 (aged 74) New York City, U.S.
- Resting place: Lutheran Cemetery, New York City, U.S.
- Party: Republican
- Profession: Politician, newspaper publisher

John Kissel (July 31, 1864, in Brooklyn, Kings County, New York – October 3, 1938, in Brooklyn, New York City) was an American newspaper publisher and politician from New York.

== Life ==
He attended public and private schools and served as a clerk in the Brooklyn Navy Yard. He learned the printing trade and published the Kings County Republican from 1889 to 1914. Kissel became a member of the New York State Republican Committee in 1886; was Clerk to the Board of Supervisors of Kings County in 1894 and 1895; and engaged in the brewery business.

Kissel was a presidential elector in 1900.

He was a member of the New York State Senate (9th D.) in 1909 and 1910; and organized, and for fifteen years conducted at his own expense, the first free labor bureau in the United States, which was subsequently merged into the United States Employment Service.

He was elected as a Republican to the 67th United States Congress, holding office from March 4, 1921, to March 3, 1923. Afterwards, he became a general tax consultant with offices in Brooklyn and was employed as an attendant at the Empire State Building.

He died on October 3, 1938, in Brooklyn, and was buried at the Lutheran Cemetery in Glendale, Queens.

New York State Senate
Preceded by Conrad Hasenflug	New York State Senate; 9th District; 1909–1910	Succeeded by Felix J. Sanner
U.S. House of Representatives
Preceded by John MacCrate	Member of the U.S. House of Representatives from New York's 3rd congressional district 1921–1923	Succeeded by George W. Lindsay
