= Thomas Creighton =

Thomas Creighton may refer to:

- Thomas Creighton (prospector), prospector who found mineral deposits in Saskatchewan
- Thomas C. Creighton (1945–2022), member of the Pennsylvania House of Representatives
- Thomas H. Creighton (1865–1942), American lawyer, teacher, and politician in the Illinois House of Representatives
- Thomas Kelso Creighton (1892–1973), Canadian politician in the Legislative Assembly of Ontario
