= Senator Burgess =

Senator Burgess may refer to:

- Carl T. Burgess (1911–1994), South Dakota State Senate
- Danny Burgess (born 1986), Florida State Senate
- H. S. Burgess (1866–1952), Illinois State Senate
- Isabel Burgess (1912–1999), Arizona State Senate
- Renee Burgess (born 1971), New Jersey State Senate

== See also ==
- Judy Burges (born 1943), Arizona State Senate
