= Irreconcilables =

US Senators opposed to ratifying the Treaty of Versailles

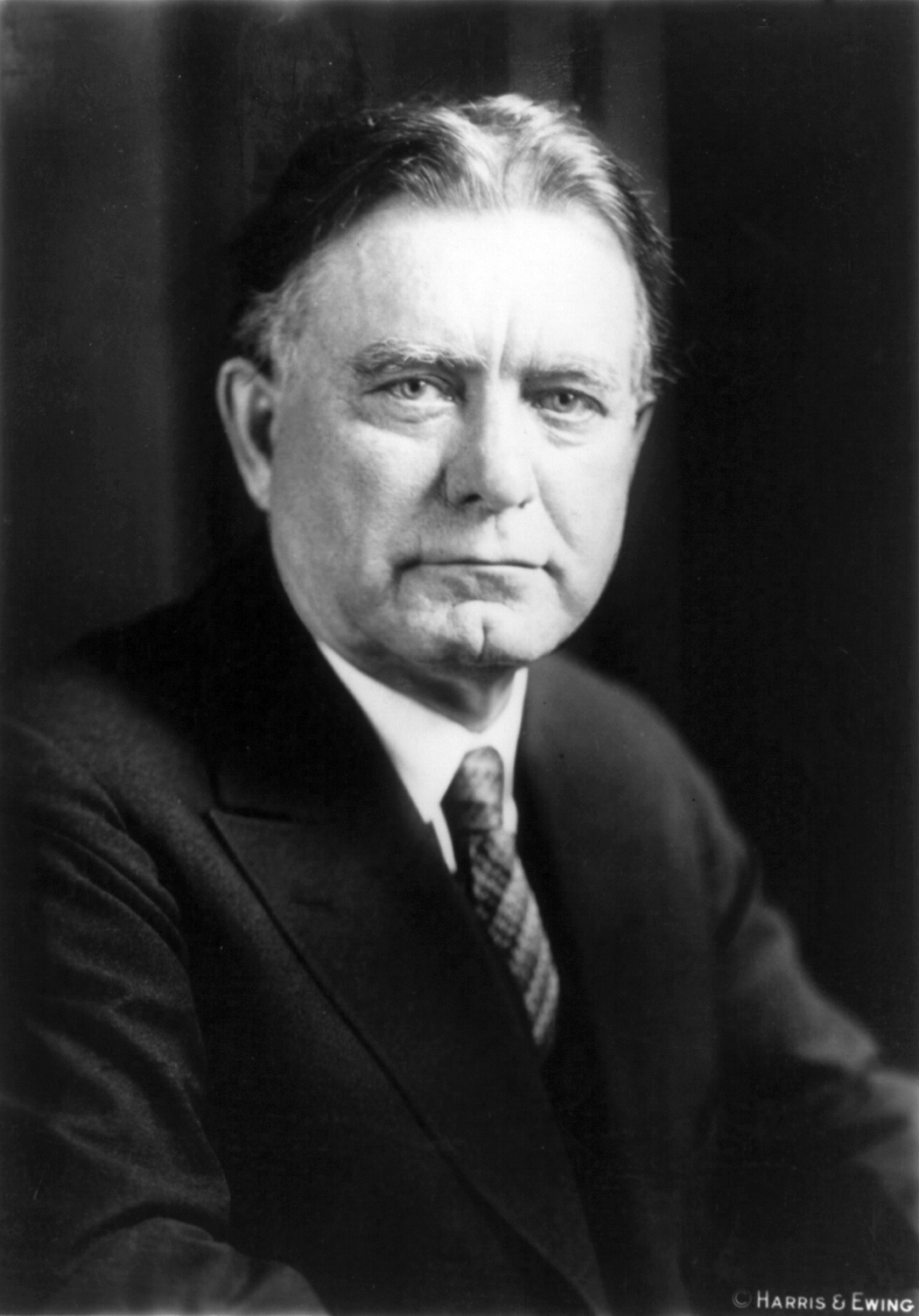
The Irreconcilables
"The Battalion of Death"
Senator William Borah, a principal force behind the faction.
Active period	1919–1920
Chamber	United States Senate
Primary target	Rejection of the Treaty of Versailles & League of Nations
Key Figures	William Borah (R-ID); Hiram Johnson (R-CA); Robert M. La Follette (R-WI); James A. Reed (D-MO)
Core Alignment	Isolationism Anti-imperialism American nationalism
Estimated strength	12 to 18 Senators
Factional Breakdown
Republicans	~14–15 Senators (Progressive & Conservative wings)
Democrats	3 Senators (Anti-Wilson Democrats)
Allied with Henry Cabot Lodge's "Reservationists" to secure final defeat of the treaty on March 19, 1920.

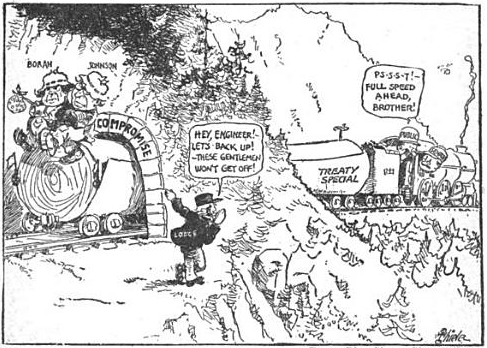
Irreconcilables, Senators Borah and Johnson, refuse to compromise on the passage of the Treaty of Versailles which Senator Lodge is guiding through the Senate. Political cartoon, 1920.

The Irreconcilables were a group of 12 to 18 United States Senators who opposed the United States ratifying the Treaty of Versailles.

The group, largely Republican but also including some Democrats, fought intensely to defeat the ratification of the treaty by the Senate in 1919. They succeeded, and the United States never ratified the Treaty of Versailles and never joined the League of Nations.

== History ==
The Republican Party controlled the United States Senate after the election of 1918, but the Senators were divided into multiple positions on the Versailles question. It proved possible to build a majority coalition, but impossible to build a two thirds coalition that was needed to pass a treaty. One bloc of Democrats strongly supported the Versailles Treaty. A second group of Democrats supported the Treaty but followed President Woodrow Wilson in opposing any amendments or reservations. The largest bloc, led by Senator Henry Cabot Lodge, comprised a majority of the Republicans. They wanted a treaty with reservations, especially on Article 10, which involved the power of the League of Nations to make war without a vote by the United States Congress. The closest the Treaty came to passage, came in mid-November 1919, was when Lodge and his Republicans formed a coalition with the pro-Treaty Democrats, and were close to a two-thirds majority for a Treaty with reservations, but Wilson rejected this compromise and enough Democrats followed his lead to permanently end the chances for ratification.

=== Members ===
Those who have been identified as members of the faction include:

- George W. Norris of Nebraska
- William Borah of Idaho
- Robert La Follette of Wisconsin
- Hiram Johnson of California
- James A. Reed of Missouri
- Thomas Gore of Oklahoma
- David I. Walsh of Massachusetts
- Frank B. Brandegee of Connecticut
- Albert B. Fall of New Mexico
- Philander C. Knox of Pennsylvania
- Lawrence Yates Sherman of Illinois
- George H. Moses of New Hampshire
- Asle J. Gronna of North Dakota
- Joseph I. France of Maryland
- Bert M. Fernald of Maine
- Medill McCormick of Illinois
- Charles S. Thomas of Colorado
- Miles Poindexter of Washington

With the exception of Reed, Walsh, and Gore, all of the Irreconcilables were Republicans.

McCormick's position can be traced to his Anglophobia and nationalistic attitudes, Sherman's to personal antipathy to President Woodrow Wilson and his domestic policies. Walsh, the Massachusetts Democrat, argued that the Treaty failed to address the "Irish question". Most of the Irreconcilables were bitter enemies of President Wilson, and he launched a nationwide speaking tour in the summer of 1919 to refute them. However, Wilson collapsed midway with a serious stroke that effectively ruined his leadership skills.

According to Stone's 1970 book, the Irreconcilables in the Senate fell into three loosely defined factions. One group was composed of isolationists and nationalists who proclaimed that America must be the sole commander of its destiny, and that membership in any international organization that might have power over the United States was unacceptable. A second group, the "realists", rejected isolationism in favor of limited cooperation among nations with similar interests. They thought the League of Nations would be too strong. A third group, the "idealists", called for a League with far reaching authority. The three factions cooperated to help defeat the treaty. All of them denounced the League as a tool of Britain and its empire.

Among the American public as a whole, the Irish Catholics and the German Americans were intensely opposed to the Treaty.

== See also ==
- Treaty of Versailles
- Henry Cabot Lodge
- Woodrow Wilson
