= William Kinsey Hutchinson =

American journalist

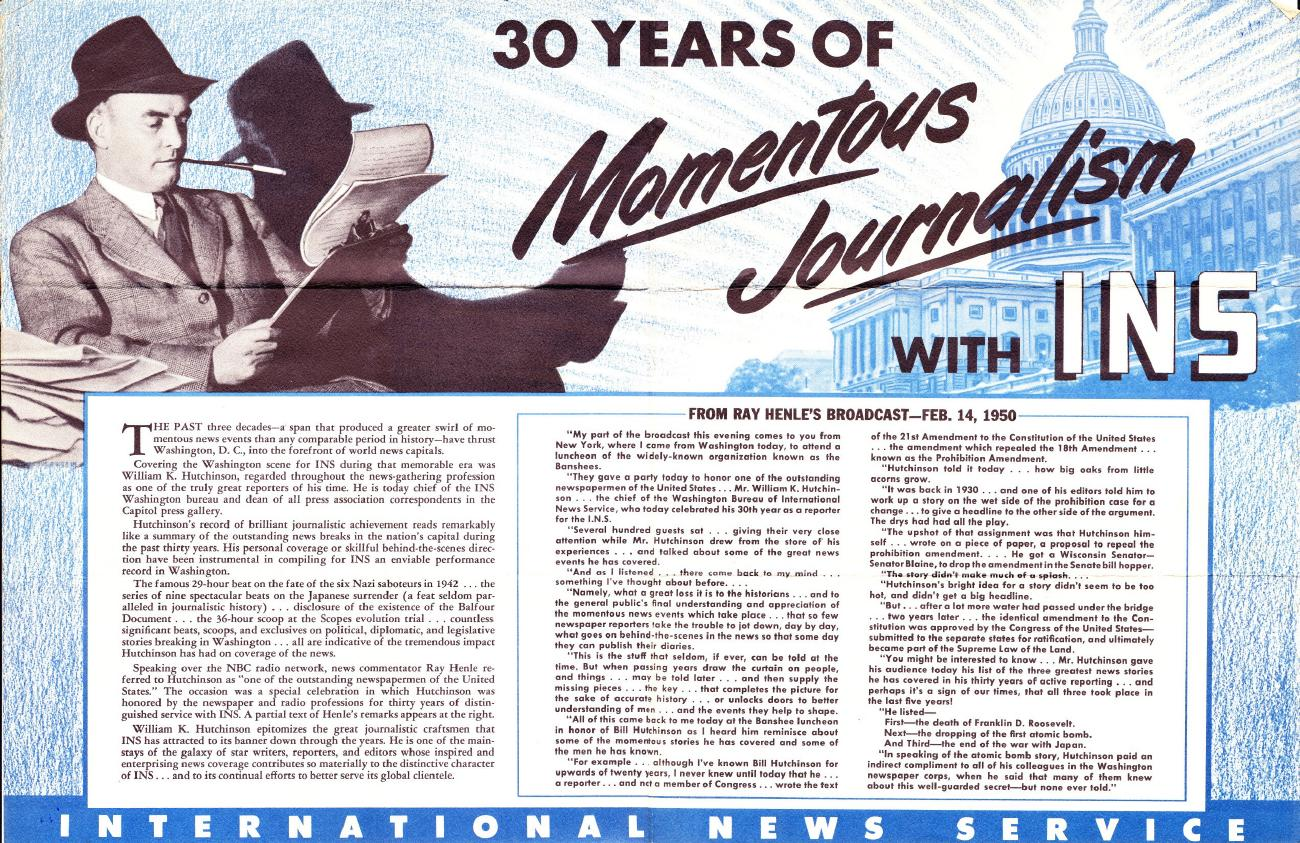
Hutchinson piece for 30th anniversary, 1950

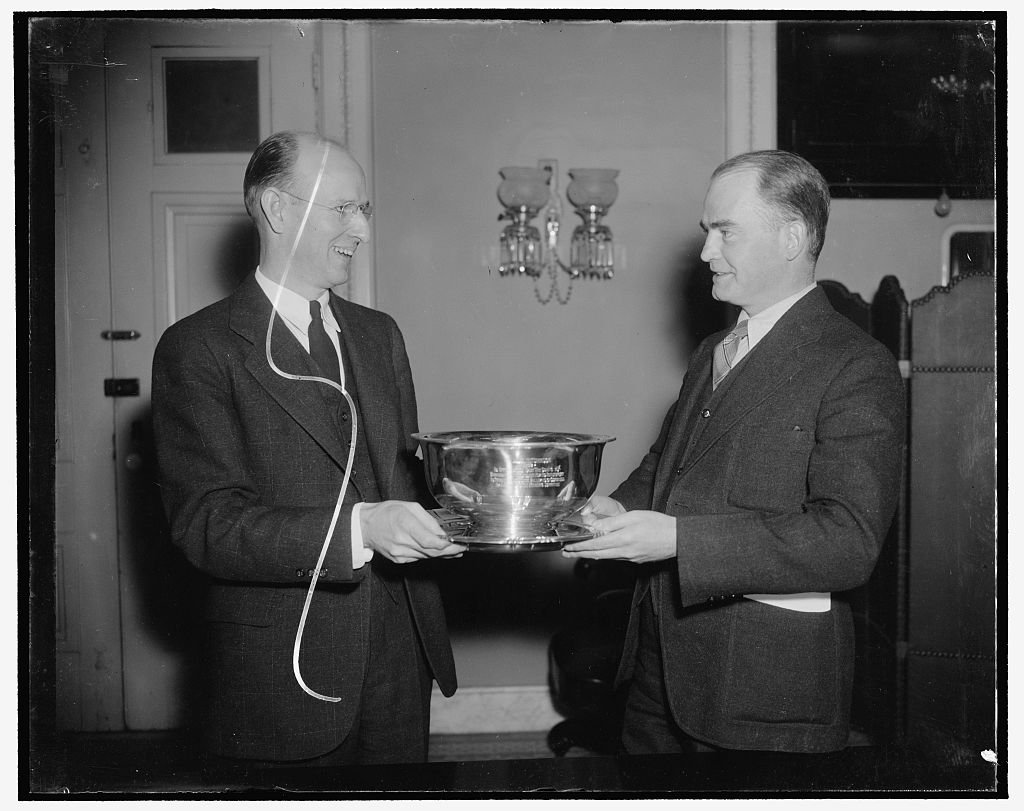
William Kinsey Hutchinson 25-FEB-1938 Silver Punch Bowl

William Kinsey Hutchinson (June 27, 1896 – May 25, 1958) was an American reporter known for his connections with presidents, legislators, cabinet members, and other U.S. government diplomats and officials.

== Career ==
Between 1913 and 1920 William (Bill) worked as a reporter for a Reading, Pennsylvania, newspaper. He moved to Washington, D.C., in 1920 and started work for William Randolph Hearst's International News Service (INS). As an INS reporter, he covered the John T. Scopes trial, also known as the Scopes trial, in Dayton, Tennessee, and on July 24, 1925, he was the first reporter to file the dispatch stating the outcome. A conversation that occurred during the last days of the trial, Scopes said:

"There's something I must tell you. It's worried me. I didn't violate the law ...I never taught that evolution lesson. I skipped it. I was doing something else the day I should have taught it, and I missed the whole lesson about Darwin and never did teach it. Those kids they put on the stand couldn't remember what I taught them three months ago. They were coached by the lawyers." "Honest, I've been scared all through the trial that the kids might remember I missed the lesson. I was afraid they'd get on the stand and say I hadn't taught it and then the whole trial would go blooey. If that happened they would run me out of town on a rail."

When Bill mentioned that would make a great news story, John responded, "My god no! Not a word of it until the Supreme Court passes my appeal. My lawyers would kill me." In L. Sprague de Camp's book The Great Monkey Trial, de Camp goes on to say that Bill claimed he overheard Clarence Darrow coaching the students on what to say; however, even with coaching, only one of the students implied that Scopes taught evolution.

Bill also covered the national political conventions and events in the Capitol. In 1939 he was the bureau chief of the International News Service in Washington, D.C. In late 1949, during a game of hearts, FBI Director J. Edgar Hoover and Bill came up with the idea for a list of names, photographs, and descriptions of the ten worst criminals wanted by the Federal Bureau of Investigation (FBI). On March 14, 1950, the list was compiled and distributed as the FBI's Most Wanted Fugitives list.

Following his transatlantic solo flight and return to the United States in 1927, Charles Lindbergh gave his flight jacket to Bill. He wore this jacket on many outings and kept it until his death. The jacket was then willed to his brother Herb. By the time of Herb's death in 1986, the jacket had so deteriorated that it was mistakenly thrown out by someone who did not realize its historic value.

Bill was a member of the bar in the District of Columbia and wrote two books, Life and Works of William E. Borah and Ten Days that Changed the World, the latter being an account of the ten days between the atomic bombings of Hiroshima and Nagasaki and the surrender of Japan. For many years he was owner and the vice president of the Washington Redskins football team. A World War I veteran, Bill received numerous awards from the Air Force, Army, and Navy for patriotic service.

Bill was the president of the Senate Press Gallery for over 20 years. As a token of appreciation for Bill's aid in having the congressional press galleries renovated, the standing committee of House and Senate correspondents today presented a silver punch bowl to William K. Hutchinson of International News Service. In the photo, taken at the Capitol on 25-FEB-1938, Hutchinson is shown receiving the bowl from Nathan Robertson (right) of King Features who is the chairman of the committee.

== Death ==
He died the day after the announcement of the merger of the International News Service with the United Press to form United Press International. On May 26, 1958, the funeral was held with Vice President Richard Nixon as one of the pallbearers. Bill was awarded the lifetime District of Columbia license plate number "53" which upon his death in 1958, was willed to John Willard Marriott.
