= 1930 United States Senate election in Idaho =

- November 4, 1930
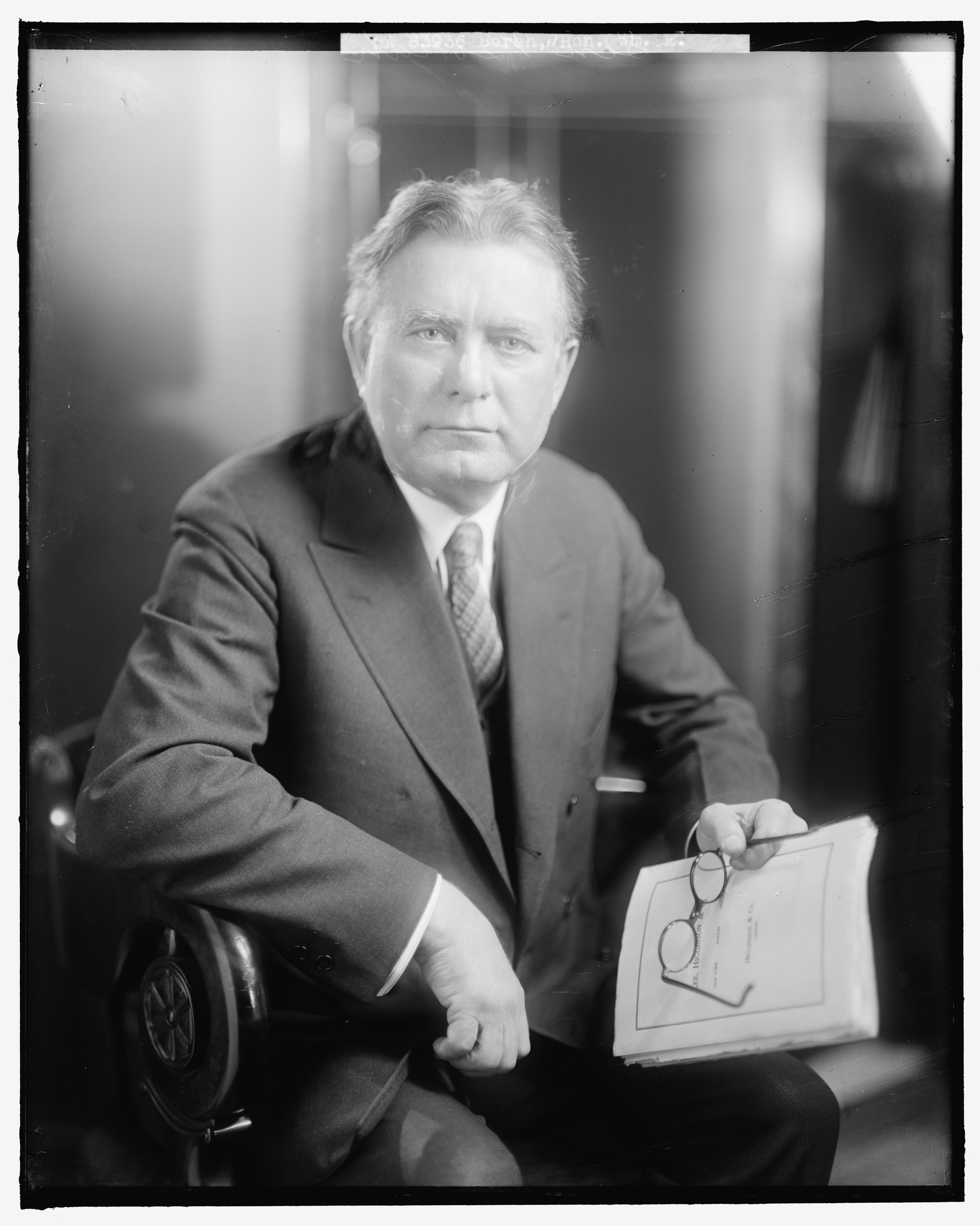
Nominee	William Borah	Joseph M. Tyler
Party	Republican	Democratic
Popular vote	94,938	36,162
Percentage	72.42%	27.58%
- County results Borah: 60–70% 70–80% 80–90%
U.S. senator before election
William Borah
Republican
Elected U.S. Senator
William Borah
Republican

The 1930 United States Senate election in Idaho took place on November 4, 1930. Incumbent Republican Senator William Borah won re-election to a fifth term, defeating Joseph M. Tyler.

== Primary elections ==
No primaries happened in this election. From 1920 to 1930, Idaho decided on its candidates with party conventions, not primaries.

=== Democratic convention ===
==== Candidates ====
- Joseph M. Tyler, failed candidate for Idaho State Treasurer in 1922 and for Idaho's 1st congressional district in 1928

=== Republican convention ===
==== Candidates ====
- William Borah, incumbent U.S. Senator

== General election ==
=== Results ===
1930 United States Senate election in Idaho
Party	Candidate	Votes	%
Republican	William Borah (incumbent)	94,938	72.42
Democratic	Joseph M. Tyler	36,162	27.58
Majority		58,776	44.84
Turnout		131,100	
Republican hold			

== See also ==
- 1930 United States Senate elections
