= 1918 United States Senate election in Idaho =

- November 5, 1918
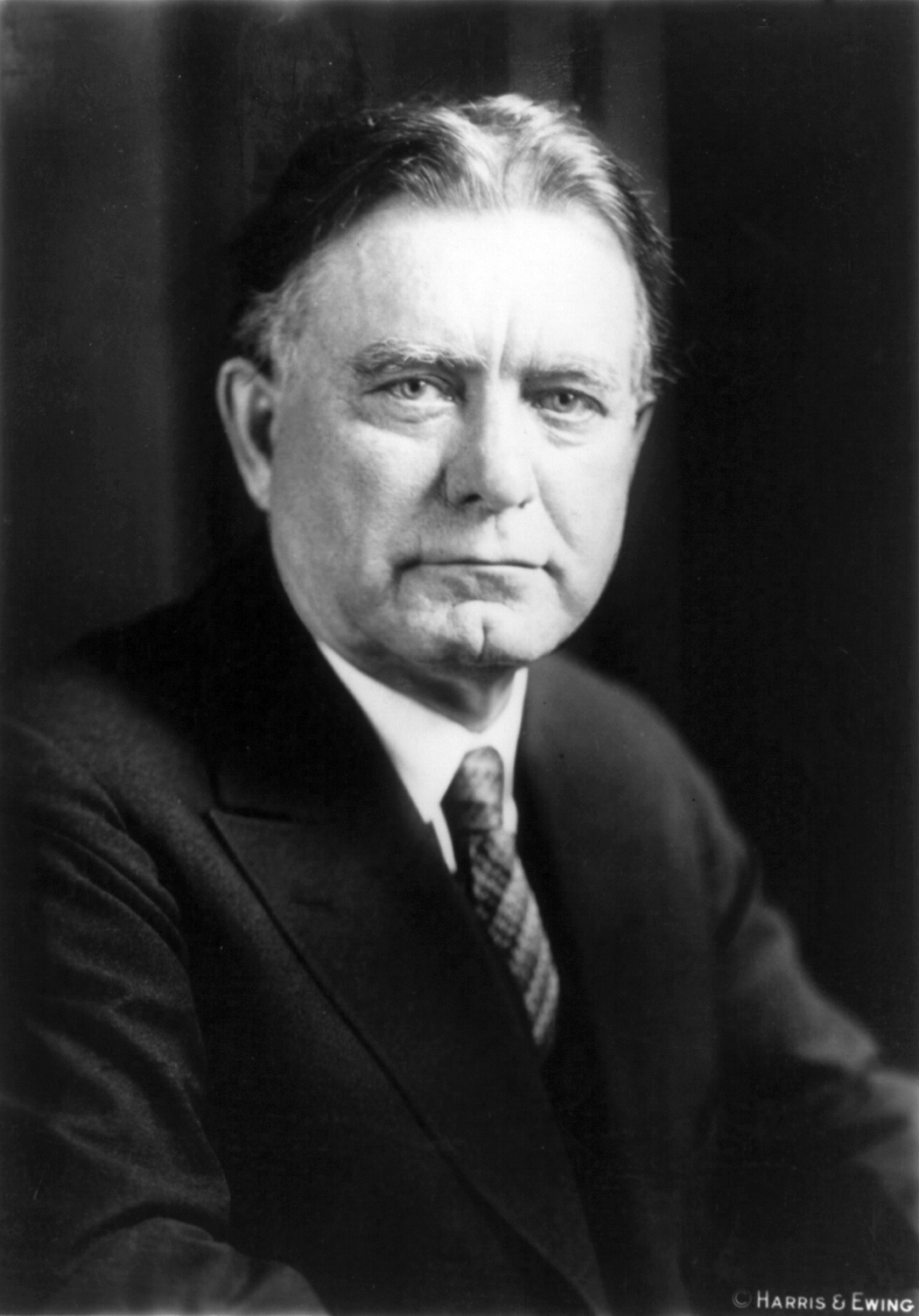
Nominee	William Borah	Frank L. Moore
Party	Republican	Democratic
Popular vote	63,587	31,018
Percentage	67.21%	32.79%
- County results Borah: 50–60% 60–70% 70–80% Moore: 50–60%
U.S. senator before election
William Borah
Republican
Elected U.S. Senator
William Borah
Republican

The 1918 United States Senate election in Idaho took place on November 5, 1918. Incumbent Republican Senator William Borah won re-election to a third term, defeating Frank L. Moore. This is the first election to this Senate seat that used the popular vote, as it was the first election to this seat after the passage of the 17th Amendment.

== Primary elections ==
Primary elections were held on September 3, 1918. However, both candidates for Senate were unopposed for the nomination.

=== Democratic primary ===
==== Candidates ====
- Frank L. Moore

==== Results ====
Democratic primary results
Party	Candidate	Votes	%
Democratic	Frank L. Moore	18,905	100.00
Total votes		18,905	

=== Republican primary ===
==== Candidates ====
- William Borah, incumbent U.S. Senator

==== Results ====
Republican primary results
Party	Candidate	Votes	%
Republican	William Borah (incumbent)	26,910	100.00
Total votes		26,910	

== General election ==
=== Results ===
1918 United States Senate election in Idaho
Party	Candidate	Votes	%
Republican	William Borah (incumbent)	63,587	67.21
Democratic	Frank L. Moore	31,018	32.79
Majority		32,569	34.42
Turnout		94,605	
Republican hold			

== See also ==
- 1918 United States Senate elections
