= Ben C. Blades =

American businessman and politician

Ben C. Blades (May 21, 1908–May 10, 1973) was an American businessman and politician.

Blades was born on a farm in Wayne County, Illinois. He went to the Wayne County public schools and graduated from the Fairfield Community High School in 1926. He worked in the crude oil production business. He also served in the Illinois State Police and as an examiner for the Illinois Drivers License Bureau. He lived in Fairfield, Illinois with his wife and family. Blades served in the Illinois House of Representatives from 1963 to 1965 and from 1967 until his death in 1973. Blades was a Republican. Blades died from a heart attack at the Springfield Memorial hospital in Springfield, Illinois.
