= 1924 United States Senate election in Idaho =

- November 4, 1924
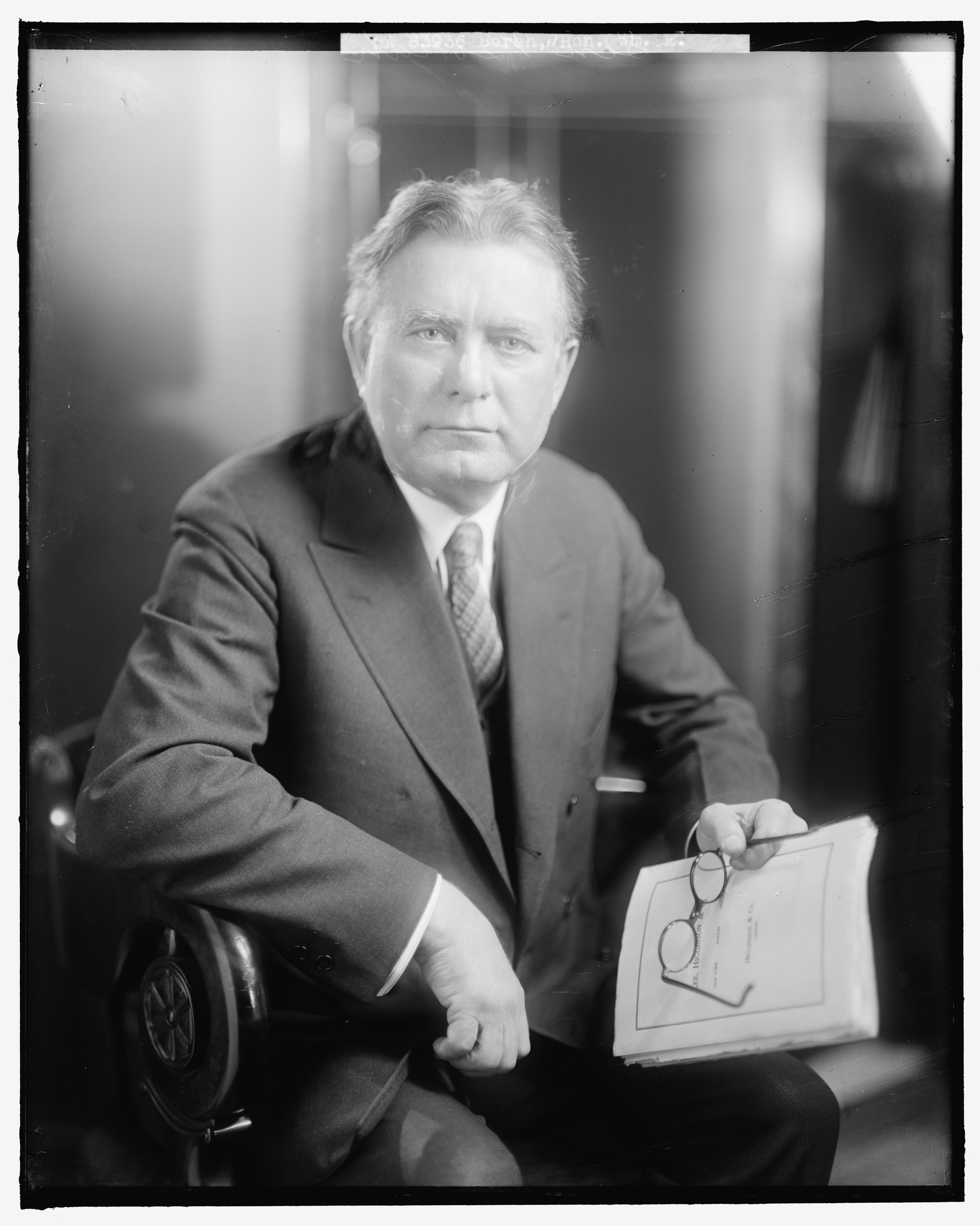
Nominee	William Borah	Frank Martin
Party	Republican	Democratic
Popular vote	99,846	25,199
Percentage	79.50%	20.06%
- County results Borah: 60–70% 70–80% 80–90% 90–100%
U.S. senator before election
William Borah
Republican
Elected U.S. Senator
William Borah
Republican

The 1924 United States Senate election in Idaho took place on November 4, 1924. Incumbent Republican Senator William Borah won re-election to a fourth term, defeating former Idaho Attorney General Frank Martin.

== Primary elections ==
No primaries happened in this election. From 1920 to 1930, Idaho decided on its candidates with party conventions, not primaries.

=== Democratic convention ===
==== Candidates ====
- Frank Martin, former Idaho Attorney General (1901-1903)

=== Republican convention ===
==== Candidates ====
- William Borah, incumbent U.S. Senator

== General election ==
=== Results ===
1924 United States Senate election in Idaho
Party	Candidate	Votes	%
Republican	William Borah (incumbent)	99,846	79.50
Democratic	Frank Martin	25,199	20.06
Socialist	Eugene F. Gary	554	0.44
Majority		74,647	59.44
Turnout		125,599	
Republican hold			

== See also ==
- 1924 United States Senate elections
