= Jeffersonville, Illinois =

Geff
- Village
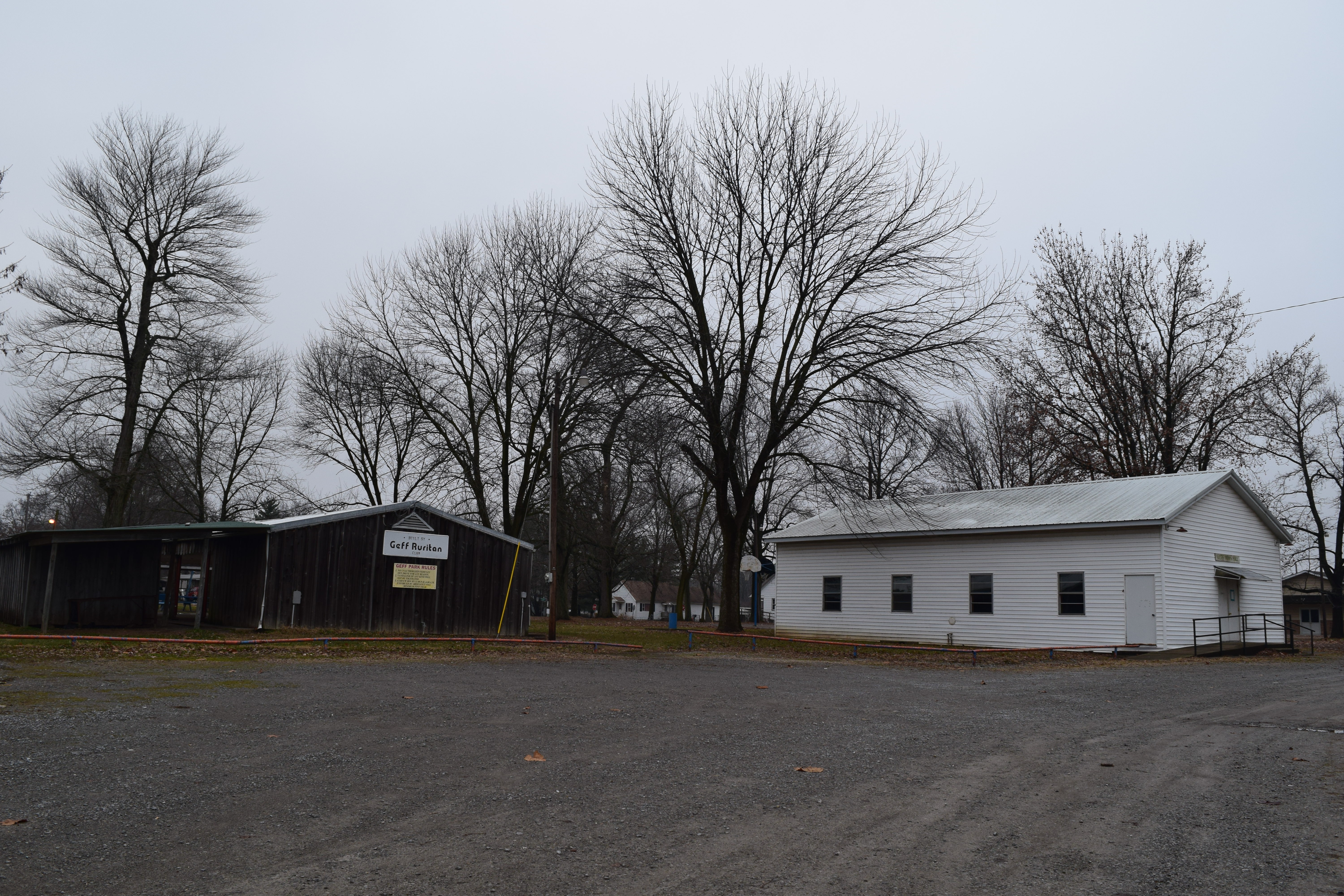
- Public park and town hall (right)

- Location of Jeffersonville in Wayne County, Illinois.
- Coordinates: 38°26′33″N 88°24′14″W
- Country: United States
- State: Illinois
- County: Wayne

Area
  - Total: 1.01 sq mi (2.62 km^{2})
  - Land: 1.01 sq mi (2.62 km^{2})
  - Water: 0 sq mi (0.00 km^{2})
- Elevation: 459 ft (140 m)

Population (2020)
  - Total: 355
  - Density: 350.7/sq mi (135.39/km^{2})
- Time zone: UTC-6 (CST)
  - Summer (DST): UTC-5 (CDT)
- ZIP code: 62842
- Area code: 618
- FIPS code: 17-38323
- GNIS feature ID: 2398294

Jeffersonville is a village in Wayne County, Illinois, United States. As of the 2020 census, Jeffersonville had a population of 355.

Although its official name is Jeffersonville, the village is known locally as Geff, with that spelling appearing on local road signs, the US Post office, and many official documents. "Geff" is pronounced as though it were spelled "Jeff". The name change is said to have been made during the 19th century by the railroad, in order to distinguish the village in Illinois from Jeffersonville, Indiana.

== History ==
Burton Hawk and his brother ran a sawmill near Geff and Fairfield. William Edwin Hawk was married to Alice Mathews, also of Fairfield. His sister, Mary Adeline, was married to Dr. Dade A. Hilliard. Mellie Ann Gray was the daughter of Thomas and Rebecca Gray. She married Burton Hawk on October 31, 1894. Burton and William's parents, Eliza Jane and David Hawk ran a general store and his son Hamby ran it after David's death in December 1916. They eventually all dispersed to Tonica, Marseilles, Lostant or Springfield Illinois.

Also, according to genealogytrails.com, David Hawk was a "Dealer in Staple and Fancy Groceries". "One of the most important business of any town larger or small, is the grocer and Mr. Hawk fills this capacity in Jeffersonville. ...in 1865 he and his wife Eliza moved to Wayne County. He began the grocery business in Jeffersonville in March 1901. He has the only exclusive grocery store in town, and makes a point to keep everything the people want in his line.... a gentleman to deal with."

== Geography ==
According to the 2010 census, Jeffersonville has a total area of 1.02 square miles (2.64 km^{2}), all land.

== Demographics ==
Historical population
Census	Pop.	Note	%±
1880	238		—
1890	256		7.6%
1900	286		11.7%
1910	237		−17.1%
1920	322		35.9%
1930	288		−10.6%
1940	288		0.0%
1950	326		13.2%
1960	330		1.2%
1970	294		−10.9%
1980	340		15.6%
1990	311		−8.5%
2000	366		17.7%
2010	367		0.3%
2020	355		−3.3%
U.S. Decennial Census

As of the census of 2000, there were 366 people, 156 households, and 99 families residing in the village. The population density was 358.8 inhabitants per square mile (138.5/km^{2}). There were 171 housing units at an average density of 167.6 per square mile (64.7/km^{2}). The racial makeup of the village was 97.81% White, 1.37% African American, 0.55% Native American, 0.27% from other races. Hispanic or Latino of any race were 2.46% of the population.

There were 156 households, out of which 34.6% had children under the age of 18 living with them, 50.0% were married couples living together, 12.2% had a female householder with no husband present, and 36.5% were non-families. 32.1% of all households were made up of individuals, and 16.7% had someone living alone who was 65 years of age or older. The average household size was 2.35 and the average family size was 2.98.

In the village, the population was spread out, with 28.1% under the age of 18, 9.0% from 18 to 24, 26.2% from 25 to 44, 18.6% from 45 to 64, and 18.0% who were 65 years of age or older. The median age was 34 years. For every 100 females, there were 98.9 males. For every 100 females age 18 and over, there were 82.6 males.

The median income for a household in the village was $25,521, and the median income for a family was $28,500. Males had a median income of $25,521 versus $16,458 for females. The per capita income for the village was $11,882. About 15.4% of families and 19.7% of the population were below the poverty line, including 23.7% of those under age 18 and 21.1% of those age 65 or over.

== Notable people ==
- Clyde W. Robbins, farmer and politician
- Shelton Brothers Gang, Southern Illinois prohibition era gangsters
