= William Borah =

American politician (1865–1940)

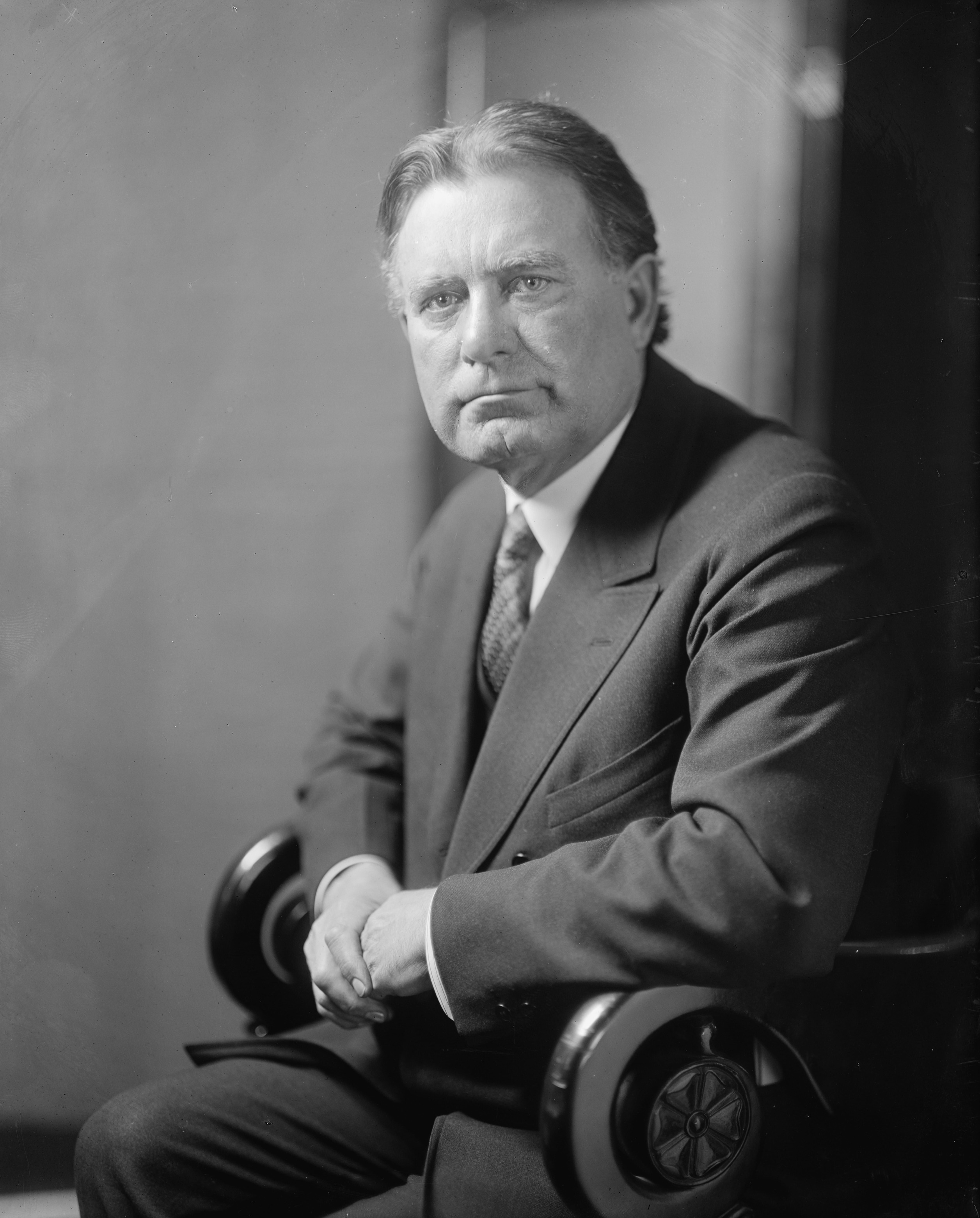

United States Senator from Idaho
- In office March 4, 1907 – January 19, 1940
- Preceded by: Fred Dubois
- Succeeded by: John Thomas
Committee chairmanships
Chair of the Senate Foreign Relations Committee
In office December 1, 1924 – March 3, 1933
Preceded by	Henry Cabot Lodge
Succeeded by	Key Pittman
Chair of the Senate Education and Labor Committee
In office February 24, 1922 – December 1, 1924
Preceded by	William S. Kenyon
Succeeded by	Lawrence C. Phipps
In office March 4, 1909 – March 3, 1913
Preceded by	Jonathan P. Dolliver
Succeeded by	Hoke Smith

Personal details
- Born: William Edgar Borah; June 29, 1865 near Fairfield, Illinois, U.S.
- Died: January 19, 1940 (aged 74) Washington, D.C., U.S.
- Resting place: Morris Hill Cemetery; Boise, Idaho, U.S.
- Party: Republican
- Other political affiliations: Silver Republican (1896–1899)
- Spouse: Mary McConnell Borah (m. 1895)
- Children: 1 daughter (with Alice Roosevelt Longworth)
- Education: University of Kansas (attended)
- Profession: Politician; attorney
- Nickname: The Lion of Idaho

William Edgar Borah (June 29, 1865 – January 19, 1940) was an outspoken Republican politician, one of the best-known figures in Idaho's history. A progressive who served as a United States senator from 1907 until his death in 1940, Borah voted for American entry into World War I but is often considered an isolationist, (Note: Or, by some, a unilateralist) for he led the Irreconcilables, senators who opposed ratification of the Treaty of Versailles, which would have made the U.S. part of the League of Nations.

Borah was born in rural Illinois to a large farming family. He studied at the University of Kansas and became a lawyer in that state before seeking greater opportunities in Idaho. He quickly rose in the law and in state politics, and after a failed run for the House of Representatives in 1896 and one for the United States Senate in 1903, was elected to the Senate in 1907. Before he took his seat in December of that year, he was involved in two prominent legal cases. One, the murder conspiracy trial of Big Bill Haywood, gained Borah fame though Haywood was found not guilty and the other, a prosecution of Borah for land fraud, made him appear a victim of political malice even before his acquittal.

In the Senate, Borah became one of the progressive insurgents who challenged President William Howard Taft's policies, though Borah refused to support former president Theodore Roosevelt's third-party bid against Taft in 1912. Borah reluctantly voted for war in 1917 and, once it concluded, he fought against the Versailles treaty, and the Senate did not ratify it. Remaining a maverick, Borah often fought with the Republican presidents in office between 1921 and 1933, though Calvin Coolidge offered to make Borah his running mate in 1924. Borah campaigned for Herbert Hoover in 1928, something he rarely did for presidential candidates and never did again.

Deprived of his post as Chairman of the Senate Foreign Relations Committee when the Democrats took control of the Senate in 1933, Borah agreed with some of the New Deal legislation, but opposed other proposals. He ran for the Republican nomination for president in 1936, but party regulars were not inclined to allow a longtime maverick to head the ticket. In his final years, he felt he might be able to settle differences in Europe by meeting with Hitler; though he did not go, this has not enhanced his historical reputation. Borah died in 1940; his statue, presented by the state of Idaho in 1947, stands in the National Statuary Hall Collection.

== Childhood and early career ==
William Edgar Borah was born in Jasper Township, Illinois, near Fairfield in Wayne County. His parents were farmers Elizabeth (West) and William Nathan Borah. Borah was distantly related to Katharina von Bora, the Catholic nun who left her convent in the 16th century and married reformer Martin Luther. His Borah ancestors came to America in about 1760, fought in the Revolutionary War, and moved west with the frontier. The young William E. Borah was the seventh of ten children, and the third son.

Although Borah was not a good student, at an early age he began to love oratory and the written word. Borah was educated at Tom's Prairie School, near Fairfield. When Borah exhausted its rudimentary resources, his father sent him in 1881 to Southern Illinois Academy, a Cumberland Presbyterian academy at Enfield, to train for the ministry. The 63 students there included two future U.S. senators, Borah and Wesley Jones, who would represent the state of Washington; the two often debated as schoolboys. Instead of becoming a preacher, Borah was expelled in 1882 for hitching rides on the Illinois Central to spend the night in the town of Carmi.

He ran away from home with an itinerant Shakespearean company, but his father persuaded him to return. In his late teenage years, he became interested in the law, and later stated, "I can't remember when I didn't want to be a lawyer ... there is no other profession where one can be absolutely independent".

With his father finally accepting his ambition to be a lawyer rather than a clergyman, Borah in 1883 went to live with his sister Sue in Lyons, Kansas; her husband, Ansel M. Lasley, was an attorney. Borah initially worked as a teacher, but became so engrossed in historical topics at the town library that he was ill-prepared for class; he and the school parted ways. In 1885 Borah enrolled at the University of Kansas, and rented an inexpensive room in a professor's home in Lawrence; he studied alongside students who would become prominent, such as William Allen White and Fred Funston. Borah was working his way through college, but his plans were scuttled when he contracted tuberculosis in early 1887. He had to return to Lyons, where his sister nursed him to health, and he began to read law under his brother-in-law Lasley's supervision. Borah passed the bar examination in September 1887, and went into partnership with his brother-in-law.

The mayor of Lyons appointed Borah as city attorney in 1889, but the young lawyer felt that he was destined for bigger things than a small Kansas town suffering in the hard times that persisted on the prairie in the late 1880s and early 1890s. Following the advice attributed to Horace Greeley, Borah chose to go west and grow up with the country. In October 1890, uncertain of his destination, he boarded the Union Pacific Railroad in Omaha. On the advice of a gambler on board the train, Borah decided to settle in Boise, Idaho. His biographer, Marian C. McKenna, said that Boise was "as far west as his pocketbook would take him".

== Pre-Senate career ==
=== Idaho lawyer ===
Idaho had been admitted to the Union earlier in 1890, and Boise, the state capital, was a boom town, where the police and courts were not yet fully effective. Borah's first case was referred to him by the gambler who had advised him on board the train; the young attorney was asked to defend a man accused of murder for shooting a Chinese immigrant in the back. Borah gained an unasked-for dismissal when the judge decided that killing a Chinese male was at worst manslaughter. Borah prospered in Boise, both in law and in politics. In 1892 he served as chair of the Republican State Central Committee. He served as political secretary to Governor William J. McConnell. In 1895 Borah married the governor's daughter, Mary McConnell. They were married until Borah's death, but had no children together.

Idaho, a mining state, was fraught with labor tensions, and related violence was common by both employers and workers. In 1899, there was a strike, and a large group of miners dynamited facilities belonging to a mining company that refused to recognize the union. They had hijacked a train to travel to destroy the company's plant. Someone in the mob shot and killed a strikebreaker. Governor Frank Steunenberg declared martial law and had more than one thousand miners arrested. Paul Corcoran, secretary of the union, was charged with murder. Borah was engaged as a prosecutor in a trial that began at Wallace on July 8, 1899. Prosecution witnesses testified to having seen Corcoran sitting on top of the train, rifle in hand, and later leaping to the platform. The defense contended that, given the sharp curves and rough roadbed of the rail line, no one could have sat on top of the train, nor jumped from it without severe injury. Borah took the jury to the train line and demonstrated how Corcoran could have acted. He drew on his skills as a teenage rail rider to ride the top of the train, and jump from it to the platform without injury. Corcoran was convicted, but his death sentence was commuted. He was pardoned in 1901, after Steunenberg left office. Borah gained wide acclaim for his dramatic prosecution of the case.

=== Senate contender ===
In 1896, Borah joined many Idahoans, including Senator Fred Dubois, in bolting the Republican Party to support the presidential campaign of Democrat William Jennings Bryan—free silver, which Bryan advocated, was extremely popular in Idaho. Borah thus became a Silver Republican in opposition to the campaign of the Republican presidential candidate, former Ohio governor William McKinley. Borah ran for the House of Representatives that year, but knew that with the silver vote split between himself and a Democrat-Populist fusion candidate, he had little chance of winning. He concentrated on making speeches aimed at gaining a legislature that would re-elect Dubois—until 1913, state legislatures chose senators. Bryan, Dubois, and Borah were all defeated.

In 1898, Borah supported the Spanish–American War and remained loyal to the Silver Republicans. By 1900, Borah deemed the silver issue of minimal importance due to increased gold production and national prosperity,. With other former silverites, he made an unapologetic return to the Republican Party. He made speeches for McKinley, who was re-elected. Bryan, however, took Idaho's electoral votes for a second time. Dubois, though nominally remaining a Silver Republican, gained control of the state Democratic Party, and was returned to the US Senate by the Idaho Legislature.

Borah's legal practice had made him prominent in southern Idaho, and in 1902 he sought election to the Senate. By this time, a united Republican Party was deemed likely to defeat the Democratic/Populist combine that had ruled Idaho for the past six years. The 1902 Idaho state Republican convention showed that Borah had, likely, the most support among the people, but the choice of senator was generally dictated by the caucus of the majority party in the legislature. In the 1902 election, Republicans retook control, electing a governor of their party, as well as the state's only House member and a large majority in the legislature. Three other Republicans were seeking the Senate seat, including Weldon B. Heyburn, a mining lawyer from the northern part of the state. When the legislature met in early 1903, Borah led on early caucus ballots, but then the other candidates withdrew and backed Heyburn; he was chosen by the caucus, and then by the legislature. There were many rumors of corruption in the choice of Heyburn, and Borah determined that the defeat would not end his political career. He decided to seek the seat of Senator Dubois (by then a Democrat) when it was filled by the legislature in early 1907.

At the state convention at Pocatello in 1904, Borah made a speech in support of the election of Theodore Roosevelt for a full term as president, which was widely applauded. But the Old Guard Republicans in Idaho opposed him and they were determined to defeat Borah in his second bid for the Senate. The same year, Dubois damaged his prospects for a third term by his opposition to the appointment of H. Smith Woolley, a member of the Church of Jesus Christ of Latter-day Saints (many Idahoans adhered to that faith), as assayer-in-charge of the United States Assay Office at Boise. Dubois had advanced politically through anti-Mormonism in the 1880s, but the issue was more or less dead in Idaho by 1904. Woolley was confirmed by the U.S. Senate despite Dubois's opposition, and Rufus G. Cook, in his article on the affair, suggested that Dubois was baited into acting by Borah and his supporters. The result was that Borah attacked Dubois for anti-Mormonism in both 1904 and 1906, which played well in the heavily Mormon counties in southeast Idaho.

Borah campaigned to end the caucus's role in selecting the Republican nominee for Senate, arguing that it should be decided by the people, in a convention. He drafted a resolution based on the one passed by the 1858 Illinois Republican convention that had endorsed Abraham Lincoln for Senate in his unsuccessful race against Stephen Douglas. He made a deal with a potential Republican rival, Governor Frank Gooding, whereby Borah would be nominated for Senate and Gooding for re-election and on August 1, 1906, both men received the state convention's endorsement by acclamation. Dubois was the Democratic choice, and Borah campaigned in support of President Roosevelt, argued that Republicans had brought the nation prosperity, and urged law and order. Voters re-elected Gooding, and selected a Republican legislature, which in January 1907 retired Dubois by electing Borah to the Senate.

=== Haywood trial, lumber accusations ===
Borah presented his credentials at the Senate prior to the formal beginning of his first term on March 4, 1907. Until 1933, Congress's regular session began in December, allowing Borah time to participate in two major trials. One of these boosted him to national prominence for his role in the prosecution of Big Bill Haywood, and the other, with Borah as the defendant, placed him at risk of going to prison.

Haywood was tried for conspiracy in the murder of ex-governor Steunenberg, who was assassinated on December 30, 1905, by a bomb planted on the gate at his home in Caldwell. Borah, who viewed Steunenberg as a father figure, was among the prominent Idahoans who hurried to Caldwell, and who viewed Steunenberg's shattered body and the bloodstained snow. Suspicion quickly fell on a man registered at a local hotel who proved to be Harry Orchard, an explosives expert and assassin. Many labor leaders were embittered against Steunenberg for his actions while in office, and Orchard implicated four of them. The three who could be found, including Haywood, were extradited from Colorado to Idaho in February 1906. As the legal challenges wound through the courts, the case became a campaign issue both for Gooding, who had signed the extradition warrant, and for Borah, who joined the prosecution team and stated that trying the case was more important to him than being sent to the Senate.

While the Haywood defendants awaited trial, Borah and others were indicted in federal court for land fraud, having to do with the acquisition by the Barber Lumber Company (for which Borah had been counsel) of title to timber land claims. Individuals had filed for the claims, and then sold them to the Barber Company, although they had sworn that the claims were for their own use. United States Attorney for Idaho, Norman M. Ruick, had expanded the grand jury from 12 members to 22 before he could get a majority vote to indict Borah (by a 12–10 margin). The indictment was perceived to be political, with Ruick acting on behalf of Idaho Republicans who had lost state party leadership to the new senator. Roosevelt took a wait-and-see attitude, upsetting Borah, who considered resigning his Senate seat even if exonerated.

Haywood was the first tried of the three defendants; jury selection began on May 9, 1907, and proceedings in Boise continued for over two months. The courtroom, corridors, and even the lawn outside were often filled. Counsel for the prosecution included Borah and future governor James H. Hawley; famed attorney Clarence Darrow led the defense team. A highlight of the trial was Borah's cross-examination of Haywood, who denied personal animus against Steunenberg and any connection with the death. Another was Borah's final argument for the prosecution in rebuttal to Darrow on July 25 and 26.

Borah recalled the night of the ex-governor's murder:

I saw Idaho dishonored and disgraced. I saw murder—no, not murder, a thousand times worse than murder; I saw anarchy wave its first bloody triumph in Idaho. And as I thought again I said "Thou living God, can the talents or the arts of counsel unteach the lesson of that hour?" No, no. Let us be brave, let us be faithful in this supreme test of trial and duty ... But you never had a duty imposed upon you which required more intelligence, more manhood, more courage than that which the people of Idaho assign to you this night in the final discharge of your duty. (Note: As per the trial transcript, held by the Idaho Historical Society. Borah later published his address as a pamphlet, taking the opportunity to polish and expand the prose, and biographers have often relied on the later version. See Grover, pp. 70–72.)

Although Darrow won the day, gaining an acquittal for Haywood, (Note: After Darrow gained a second acquittal, for George Pettibone, the charges against the third defendant, Charles Moyer, were dropped. Orchard was tried and convicted; his sentence was reduced from death to life imprisonment because he had turned state's evidence; he died in prison in 1954 at age 88. Haywood was convicted of espionage for his opposition to World War I by federal Judge Kenesaw Mountain Landis, jumping bail to Russia during the appeal and dying in 1928 in Moscow. See McKenna, p. 63.) the trial transformed Borah from an obscure freshman senator into a national figure. But Borah still had to face a jury on the land fraud charge, which he did in September 1907, a trial held then at Roosevelt's insistence—Ruick had asked for more time, but Borah wanted the matter disposed of before Congress met in December. Borah refused to challenge the indictment. At the trial, his counsel allowed Ruick free rein; the judge commented on Ruick's inability to tie Borah to any offense. The defense case consisted almost entirely of Borah's testimony, and the jury quickly acquitted him, setting off wild celebrations in Boise. Roosevelt dismissed Ruick as US Attorney in 1908.

== Senator (1907–1940) ==
=== Progressive insurgent (1907–1913) ===
When Borah went to Washington for the Senate's regular session in December 1907, he was immediately a figure of note, not only for the dramatic events in Idaho but for keeping his Western habits, including wearing a ten-gallon hat. It was customary then for junior senators to wait perhaps a year before giving their maiden speech, but at Roosevelt's request, in April 1908, Borah spoke in defense of the president's dismissal of more than 200 African-American soldiers in the Brownsville Affair in Texas. The cause of their innocence had been pressed by the fiery Ohio senator, Joseph B. Foraker. The soldiers were accused of having shot up a Texas town near their military camp. Borah said that their alleged actions were as wrongful as the murder of Steunenberg. The accusations were later re-investigated. The government concluded that the soldiers had been accused because of racist officials in the town and, in 1972, long after the deaths of Roosevelt, Borah, and most of the soldiers, their dishonorable discharges from the military were reversed.

Republican leaders had heard that Borah was an attorney for corporations, who had prosecuted labor leaders; they believed him sympathetic to their Old Guard positions and assigned him to important committees. Borah believed in the rights of unions, so long as they did not commit violent acts. When Borah staked out progressive positions after his swearing-in, Rhode Island Senator Nelson Aldrich, the powerful chairman of the Senate Finance Committee, hoped to put pressure on him through the Westerner's corporate clients, only to find that he had given up those representations before coming to Washington. Borah became one of a growing number of progressive Republicans in the Senate. Yet, Borah often opposed liberal legislation, finding fault with it or fearing it would increase the power of the federal government. Throughout his years in the Senate, in which he would serve until his death in 1940, his idiosyncratic positions would limit his effectiveness as a reformer.

After Roosevelt's hand-picked successor as president, former Secretary of War William Howard Taft, was inaugurated in March 1909, Congress battled over what became the Payne–Aldrich Tariff. At the time, tariffs were the main source of government revenue, and conflicts over them were passionate. The party platform had promised tariff reform, which progressive insurgents like Borah took to mean tariff reductions. Old Guard legislators like Senator Aldrich disagreed, and the final version actually raised rates by about one percent. The battles alienated Borah from Taft, who in a speech at Winona, Minnesota, described the new law as the best tariff the country had ever had. Borah and other progressives had proposed an income tax to be attached to the tariff bill; when this was unacceptable to Taft, who feared the Supreme Court would strike it down again, Borah repackaged it as a constitutional amendment, which passed the Senate unanimously and then the House, and to the surprise of many, passed the requisite number of state legislatures by 1913 to become the Sixteenth Amendment.

Borah also had a hand in the other constitutional amendment to be ratified in 1913, the Seventeenth Amendment, providing for the direct election of senators by the people. In 1909, due to Borah's influence, the Idaho Legislature passed an act for a statewide election for US senators, with legislators in theory bound to choose the winner. By 1912 over 30 states had similar laws. Borah promoted the amendment in the Senate in 1911 and 1912 until it passed Congress and, after a year, it was ratified by the states. With the power to elect senators having passed to the people, according to McKenna, the popular Borah "secured for himself a life option on a seat in the Senate".

Borah opposed Taft over a number of issues and in March 1912 announced his support of the candidacy of Roosevelt over Taft for the Republican presidential nomination. Most delegates to the 1912 Republican National Convention in Chicago selected by primary supported Roosevelt, but as most states held conventions to select delegates, Taft's control of the party machinery gave him the advantage. A number of states, especially in the South, had contested delegate seats, matters which would be initially settled by the Republican National Committee. Borah was Idaho's Republican National Committeeman and was one of those designated by the Roosevelt campaign to fight for it on the RNC. As Taft controlled the committee, Borah found few victories. Borah was among those who tried to find a compromise candidate, and was spoken of for that role, but all such efforts failed.

When it became clear Taft would be renominated, Roosevelt and his supporters bolted the party; the former president asked Borah to chair the organizational meeting of his new Progressive Party, but the Idahoan refused. Borah would not countenance leaving the Republican Party and did not support any of the presidential candidates (the Democrats nominated New Jersey Governor Woodrow Wilson). When Roosevelt came to Boise on a campaign swing in October, Borah felt he had to greet the former president and sit on the platform as Roosevelt spoke, though he was unwilling to endorse him. Roosevelt told in his speech of a long list of state delegate votes he said had been stolen from him, and after each, turned to Borah and asked, "Isn't that so, Senator Borah?" giving him no choice but to nod. It is not clear whether Borah voted for Roosevelt or Taft, he later stated both at different times. The main issue in Idaho was Borah's re-election, which was so popular that those disgruntled at the senator for not supporting Taft or Roosevelt kept quiet. Idahoans helped elect Wilson, but sent 80 Republican legislators out of 86 to Boise (with two of the six Democrats pledged to support Borah if necessary), who on January 14, 1913, returned William Borah for a second term. (Note: The Seventeenth Amendment did not go into force until later in 1913.)

=== Wilson years ===
==== Prewar (1913–1917) ====
The Republicans both lost the presidency with Wilson's inauguration and went into the minority in the Senate. In the reshuffle of committee assignments that followed, Borah was given a seat on Foreign Relations. He would occupy it for the next quarter century, becoming one of America's leading figures on international affairs.

Borah generally approved of many of Wilson's proposals, but found reasons to vote against them. He voted against the Federal Reserve Act of 1913 (believing it was a handout to the rich), after gaining a concession that no banker would initially be appointed to the Federal Reserve Board. Borah believed monopolies, public and private, should be broken up, and believed the new Federal Trade Commission would prove a means for trusts to control their regulators; he voted against the bill and stated he would not support confirmation of the first commissioners. The Clayton Antitrust Act, Borah opined, was merely a means by which Congress could appear to be dealing with the trusts without actually doing so.

In 1913 and early 1914, Borah clashed with Wilson and his Secretary of State, Bryan, over Latin American policy. Borah believed that there was an ongoing temptation for the U.S. to expand into Latin America, which the construction of the Panama Canal had made worse. If the U.S. did so, the local population would have to be subjugated or incorporated into the American political structure, neither of which he deemed possible. Believing that nations should be left unmolested by greater powers, Borah decried American interference in Latin American governments; he and Wilson clashed over policy towards Mexico, then in the throes of revolution. Wilson decided that the Mexican government, led by Victoriano Huerta, must pledge elections in which Huerta would not run before being recognized. Although Borah disliked Huerta as too close to the pre-revolutionary leadership, he felt that Mexicans should decide who ran Mexico, and argued against Wilson's plan.

After World War I began in 1914, it was Borah's view that the U.S. should keep completely out of it and he voted for legislation requested by Wilson barring armament shipments to the belligerents. Borah was disquieted when Wilson permitted credits to Great Britain and France after refusing them loans, as the credits served the same purpose, furthering the war. He was vigilant in support of the neutral rights of the United States, and was outraged both by the 1915 sinking of the Lusitania by the Germans and by infringements against Americans by British forces. Borah was spoken of as a possible candidate for president in 1916, but gained little support: the Old Guard disliked him almost as much as they did Roosevelt, while others questioned whether a man so free from the discipline of the party could lead its ranks. Borah stated he lacked the money to run. He did work behind the scenes to find a candidate that would reunite the Republicans and holdout Progressives: a member of a joint committee of the two parties' conventions to seek re-unification, Borah achieved a friendly reception when he addressed the Progressive convention. The Republicans nominated Charles Evans Hughes, and Progressive leaders reluctantly backed him, but some former Roosevelt supporters refused to support Hughes. Borah campaigned for the Republican presidential candidate (something he would do only once more, for Hoover in 1928), but Wilson narrowly won re-election.

==== World War and Versailles treaty (1917–1920) ====
[President Wilson] is in favor of a League of Nations. If the Savior of mankind would revisit the earth and declare for a league ... I would be opposed to it. That is my position and it is not a question of personality. It is a question of policy for my government.

— William E. Borah to the Senate, December 1918

After Germany resumed unlimited submarine warfare in early 1917, many considered U.S. entry into the war inevitable, though Borah expressed hope it might still be avoided. Nevertheless, he supported Wilson on legislation to arm merchant ships, and voted in favor when the president requested a declaration of war in April 1917. He made it clear that in his view, the U.S. was going in to defend its own rights and had no common interest with the Allies beyond the defeat of the Central Powers. He repeated this often through the war: the United States sought no territory, and had no interest in French and British desires for territory and colonies. Borah, though a strong war supporter, was possibly the most prominent wartime advocate of progressive views, opposing the draft and the Espionage Act of 1917, and pressing Wilson for statements of limited war aims. Borah's term was to expire in 1919; never a wealthy person and hard-hit by the high cost of living in wartime Washington, he considered leaving the Senate and practicing law in a major New York firm. However, he felt needed in the Senate and in Idaho, as both of the state's seats would be up for election in November 1918 due to the death of Borah's junior colleague, James H. Brady. Even President Wilson urged Borah's re-election in a letter to former senator Dubois. Borah received two-thirds of the vote in his bid for a third term, while former governor Gooding narrowly won Brady's seat. Nationally, the Republicans retook control of the Senate with a 49–47 majority.

That the war would not last long beyond the election was clear in the final days of the 1918 congressional midterm election campaign, which was fought in part to decide which party would control the postwar peace process. Wilson hoped for a treaty based on the Fourteen Points and had urged formation of a postwar organization to assure peace. Borah, well aware the U.S. would play a large role at the peace table, saw such an organization as a trap that would inevitably involve the U.S. whenever conflict developed in Europe. He decided to oppose Wilson's plan despite his personal admiration for the president. Like many Westerners, Borah held agrarian ideals, and linked them with a policy of isolationism and avoiding foreign entanglements he believed had served the nation well. Borah took pains, throughout the battle, to stress that he had opposed the principle of a league before it became a partisan issue; according to McKenna, in Borah's League fight, "of partisanship, jealousy, or personal hostility there is no trace".

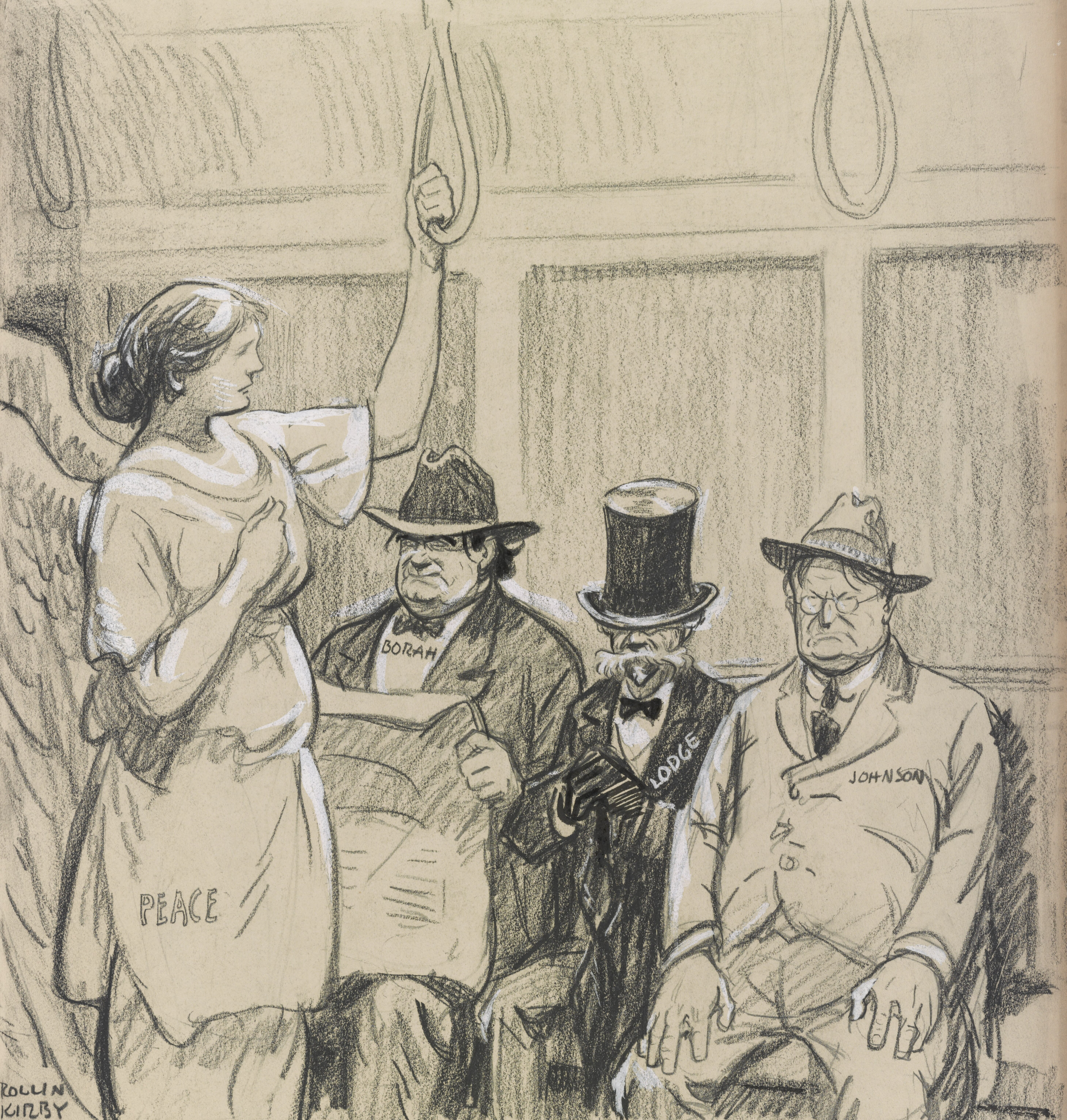
Borah (seated at left), Lodge, and California's Hiram Johnson refuse to yield their seats to Peace.

Republicans felt Wilson was making a political issue of the peace, especially when the president urged a Democratic Congress prior to the 1918 election, and attended the Paris Peace Conference in person, taking no Republican members of Congress on his delegation. Wilson had felt his statement was the only chance of getting a Senate that might ratify a treaty for a postwar organization to keep the peace, and deemed conciliation pointless. In Paris, Wilson and other leaders negotiated what would become the League of Nations, an international organization that world leaders hoped that through diplomacy, and if necessary, force, would assure peace. Republican senatorial opinion ranged from the Irreconcilables like Borah, who would not support any organization, to those who strongly favored one; none wanted Wilson to go into the 1920 presidential election (Note: Although Wilson had been elected twice, there was no constitutional barrier to a third term.) with credit for having sorted out Europe. Once the general terms of the Treaty of Versailles, which included the Charter of the League of Nations, were presented by Wilson in February 1919, Henry Cabot Lodge of Massachusetts, the incoming Senate Majority Leader, decided on a strategy: rather than outright opposition, Republicans would offer reservations to the treaty that Wilson could not accept.

A week after Wilson presented the treaty, Borah declined an invitation to the White House extended to him and other Senate and House members on the foreign relations committees, alleging there was no chance of common ground, though he wrote to Wilson's private secretary that no insult was intended. In the following months, Borah was a leader of the Irreconcilables. An especial target was Article X of the charter, obligating all members to defend each other's independence. The Irreconcilables argued that this would commit the U.S. to war without its consent; Borah stated that the U.S. might be forced to send thousands of men if there was conflict in Armenia. Other provisions were examined; Borah proposed that the U.S. representatives in Paris be asked to press the issue of Irish independence, but the Senate took no action. Borah found the provisions of the treaty regarding Germany to be shocking in their vindictiveness, and feared they might snuff out the new Weimar Republic at birth.

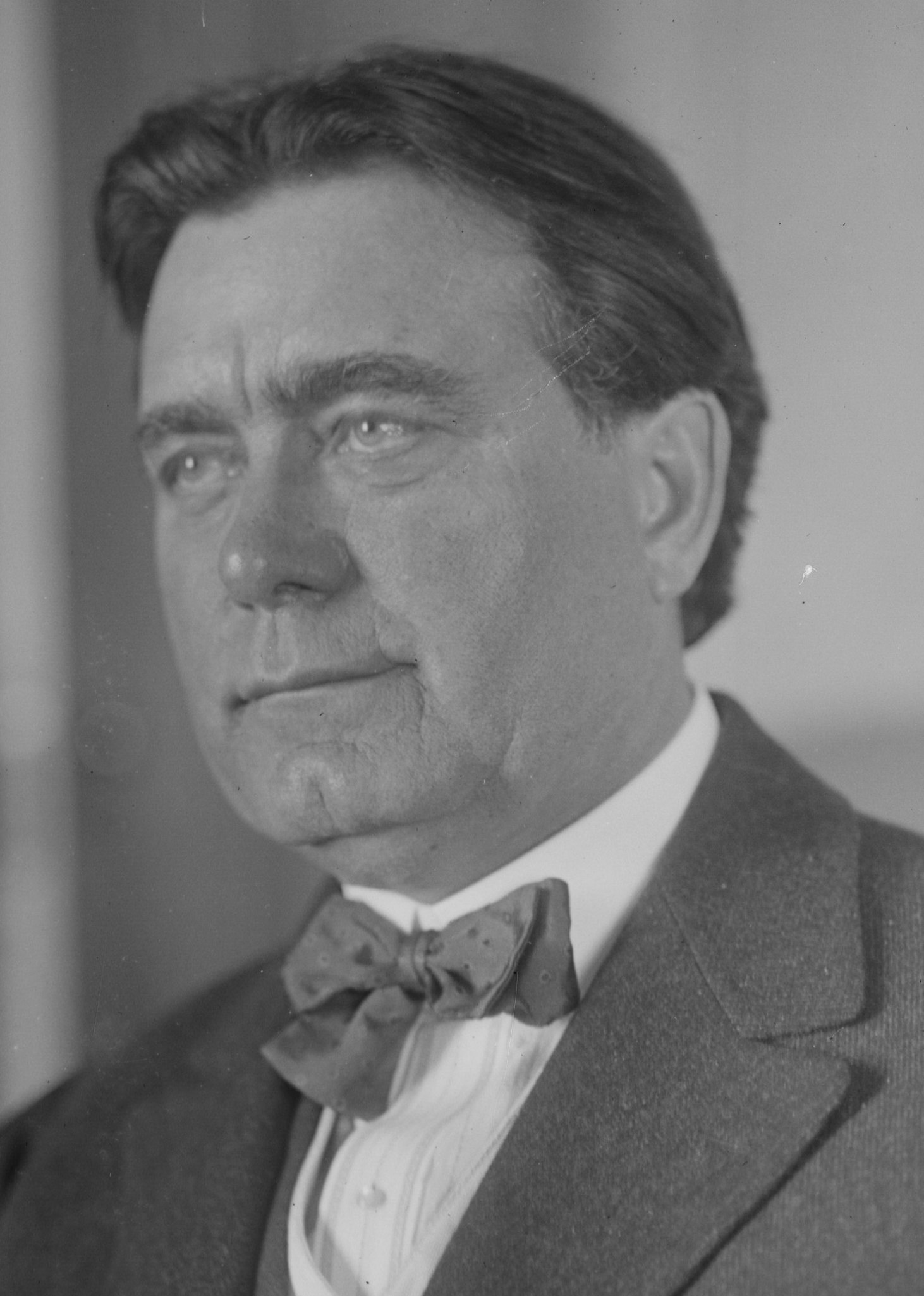
Borah c. 1919–1925

The small Republican majority in the Senate made Irreconcilable votes necessary to Lodge's strategy, and he met with Borah in April 1919, persuading him to go along with the plan of delay and reservations as the most likely to succeed, as it would allow the initial popular support for Wilson's proposal to diminish. Neither senator really liked or trusted the other, but they formed a wary pact to defeat the treaty. Lodge was also chairman of the Senate Foreign Relations Committee and he delayed the treaty by convening a lengthy series of hearings, presiding over a committee packed with Irreconcilables, including Borah. As these hearings continued in the summer of 1919, Wilson undertook a speaking tour by train to get the public to press the Senate for ratification, a tour that ended in his collapse. In the months that followed, an ailing Wilson refused any compromise.

Borah helped write the majority report for the committee, recommending 45 amendments and 4 reservations. In November 1919, the Senate defeated both versions of the Treaty of Versailles, with and without what were called the Lodge Reservations. Borah, delighted, proclaimed the day the greatest since the end of the Civil War. The following January, the Senate considered the treaty again and Lodge wanted to convene a bipartisan group of senators to find a compromise. Borah, threatening party schism, met with Lodge behind closed doors, and Lodge withdrew his plan. The Senate voted once more, in March 1920, on the treaty with a version of the Lodge Reservations, and it failed again. According to Robert James Maddox in his book on Borah's influence on American foreign policy, the Irreconcilables "dictated to the majority leader as though they were the majority. Borah as much as any man deserves the credit—or the blame—for the League's defeat".

=== Women's suffrage ===
Idaho had given women the right to vote in 1896, and Borah was a firm supporter of woman's suffrage. However, he did not support a constitutional amendment to accomplish this nationwide, feeling that states should not have the requirement that women vote imposed on them. Borah voted against the proposed amendment when it came up for a vote in 1914, and it did not pass. Activists felt that as a noted progressive, and as one who would face the voters for the first time as a senator in 1918, that he could be persuaded to support the amendment, and if not, unseated. When what would become the Nineteenth Amendment passed the House, Borah announced his opposition, writing to an Idahoan, "I am aware…[my position] will lead to much criticism among friends at home [but] I would rather give up the office [than] cast a vote…I do not believe in."

Activists determined to pressure Borah with petitions from his constituents, and former president Roosevelt sent him a note urging him to change his vote. This had no effect, and when the Senate voted on the amendment in early October 1918, it failed by two votes, with Borah voting in the negative. More petitions and pressure on Borah followed, and the senator agreed to meet with suffragist leader Alice Paul. After the meeting, Paul stated that Borah had agreed to support the amendment if re-elected, but the senator said he had agreed to no such thing. Nevertheless, Paul called off the efforts to sway or defeat Borah, and the senator retained his seat by nearly a two-to-one margin.

During the lame duck session of Congress that followed the election, Borah issued no public statement as to how he would vote when the amendment was brought up again. In February 1919, the Senate voted again, and Borah voted no—the amendment failed by one vote. Several of the new senators who took office in March 1919 were pledged to support the amendment, and on June 4, the Senate voted again, with the House having previously voted to approve the amendment. It passed with a margin of two votes, and was sent to the states for ratification (which was completed in August 1920), but Borah again voted no, one of only eight Republicans to do so.

=== Harding and Coolidge years ===
Borah was determined to see that the Republican presidential candidate in 1920 was not pro-League. He supported his fellow Irreconcilable, California Senator Hiram Johnson, who had been Roosevelt's running mate in 1912. Borah alleged bribery on the part of the leading candidate for the Republican nomination, General Leonard Wood, and was snubbed when he demanded to know the League views of Wood's main rival, Illinois Governor Frank Lowden. When the 1920 Republican National Convention met in Chicago in June, delegates faced a deadlock both as to who should head the ticket, and as to the contents of the League plank of the party platform. The League fight was decided, with Borah's endorsement, by using language proposed by former Secretary of State Elihu Root supporting a league, rather than the League. The presidential stalemate was harder to resolve. A hater both of political intrigue and of tobacco, Borah played no part in the smoke-filled room discussions as the Republicans attempted to break the deadlock. He was initially unenthusiastic about the eventual nominee, Ohio Senator Warren G. Harding, his colleague on the Foreign Relations Committee, as he was disappointed at the failure of Johnson's candidacy and disliked Harding's vague stance on the League. Nevertheless, Borah strongly endorsed Harding and his running mate, Massachusetts Governor Calvin Coolidge, who were victorious. Borah later stated he would have left the Senate had Harding lost.

Borah proved as idiosyncratic as ever in his views with Harding as president. The original idea for the Washington Naval Conference of 1921–22 came from a resolution he introduced in December 1920. After the new Secretary of State, Charles Hughes, took the idea, Borah became an opponent, convinced the conference would lead the United States into the League of Nations through the back door. In 1921, when Harding nominated former president Taft as chief justice, Borah was one of four senators to oppose confirmation. Borah stated that Taft, at 63, was too old and as a politician had been absent for decades from the practice of law. In 1922 and 1923, Borah spoke against passage of the Dyer Anti-Lynching Bill, which had passed the House. A strong supporter of state sovereignty, he believed that punishing state officials for failure to prevent lynchings was unconstitutional, and that if the states could not prevent such murders, federal legislation would do no good. The bill was defeated by filibuster in the Senate by Southern Democrats. When another bill (Costigan–Wagner Bill) was introduced in 1935 and 1938, Borah continued to speak against it, by that time saying that it was no longer needed, as the number of lynchings had dropped sharply.

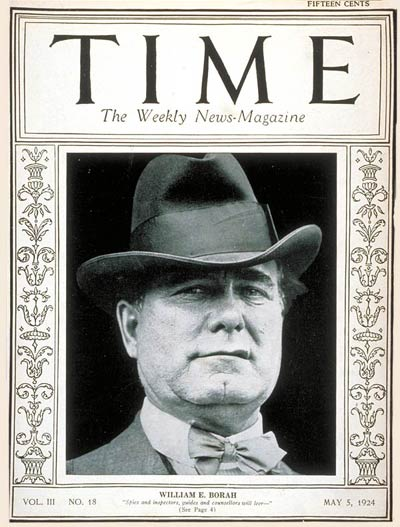
Time cover, May 5, 1924

Harding's death in August 1923 brought Calvin Coolidge to the White House. Borah had been dismayed by Harding's conservative views, and believed Coolidge had shown liberal tendencies as a governor. He met with Coolidge multiple times in late 1923, and found the new president interested in his ideas on policies foreign and domestic. Borah was encouraged when Coolidge included in his annual message to Congress a suggestion that he might open talks with the Soviet Union on trade—the Bolshevik government had not been recognized since the 1917 October Revolution and Borah had long urged relations. Under pressure from the Old Guard, Coolidge quickly walked back his proposal, depressing Borah, who concluded the president had deceived him. In early 1924, the Teapot Dome scandal broke, and although Coolidge had no involvement in the affair, some of the implicated cabinet officers, including Attorney General Harry Daugherty, remained in office, backed by the Old Guard. Coolidge sought the support of Borah in the crisis; his price was Daugherty's firing. The president stalled Borah, and when Daugherty eventually resigned under pressure, it was due more to events than Borah. When the president was nominated for election in his own right at the 1924 Republican National Convention, he offered the vice presidential nomination to Borah. By one account, when Coolidge asked Borah to join the ticket, the senator asked which position on it he was to occupy. The prospect of Borah as vice president appalled Coolidge's cabinet members and other Republican officials, and they were relieved when he refused. Borah spent less than a thousand dollars on his Senate re-election campaign that fall, and gained a fourth term with just under 80 percent of the vote. Coolidge and his vice-presidential choice, Charles G. Dawes easily won, though Borah did no campaigning for the Coolidge/Dawes ticket, alleging his re-election bid required his full attention.

Senator Lodge died in November 1924, making Borah the senior member of the Foreign Relations Committee, and he took its chairmanship. He could have become Judiciary Committee chairman instead, as the death of Frank Brandegee of Connecticut made Borah senior Republican on that committee as well. The Foreign Relations chairmanship greatly increased his influence, one quip was that the new Secretary of State, Frank B. Kellogg, created policy by ringing Borah's doorbell. Borah continued to oppose American interventions in Latin America, often splitting from the Republican majority over the matter. Borah was an avid horseback rider, and Coolidge is supposed to have commented after viewing him exercising in Rock Creek Park that it "must bother the Senator to be going in the same direction as his horse".

Borah was involved through the 1920s in efforts for the outlawry of war. Chicago lawyer Salmon Levinson, who had formulated the plan to outlaw war, labored long to get the mercurial Borah on board as its spokesman. Maddox suggested that Borah was most enthusiastic about this plan when he needed it as a constructive alternative to defeat actions such as entry into the World Court, that he deemed entangling the U.S. abroad. By the time of the 1924 election, Levinson was frustrated with Borah, but Coolidge's statement after the election that outlawry was one of the issues he proposed to address, briefly resurrected Borah's enthusiasm. only to have it fall away again. It was not until 1927, when French Foreign Minister Aristide Briand proposed the U.S. and his nation enter into an agreement to "outlaw war" that Borah became interested again, though it took months of pestering by Levinson. In December 1927, Borah introduced a resolution calling for a multilateral version of Briand's proposal, and once the Kellogg–Briand Pact was negotiated and signed by various nations, secured ratification for that treaty by the Senate.

=== Hoover and FDR ===
Borah hoped to be elected president in 1928, but his only chance was a deadlocked Republican convention. He was reluctant to support Secretary of Commerce Herbert Hoover for president, backing Ohio Senator Frank Willis instead, but after Willis collapsed and died at a campaign rally in late March, Borah began to find Hoover more to his liking. The Idahoan's support for Hoover became more solid as the campaign began to shape as a rural/urban divide. Borah was a strong backer of Prohibition, and the fact that Hoover was another "dry" influenced Borah in his support; the senator disliked the Democratic candidate, New York Governor Al Smith, an opponent of Prohibition, considering him a creature of Tammany Hall. Though Montana Senator Thomas J. Walsh commented on "Borah's recent conversion to Hoover", and some progressives were disheartened, Borah undertook a lengthy campaign tour, warning that he saw "the success of Tammany in national politics as nothing less than a national disaster". Hoover was elected and thanked Borah for "the enormous effect" of his support. He offered to make Borah Secretary of State, though deploring the loss to the Senate, but Borah declined. Borah opposed the McNary-Haugen Act as unconstitutional.

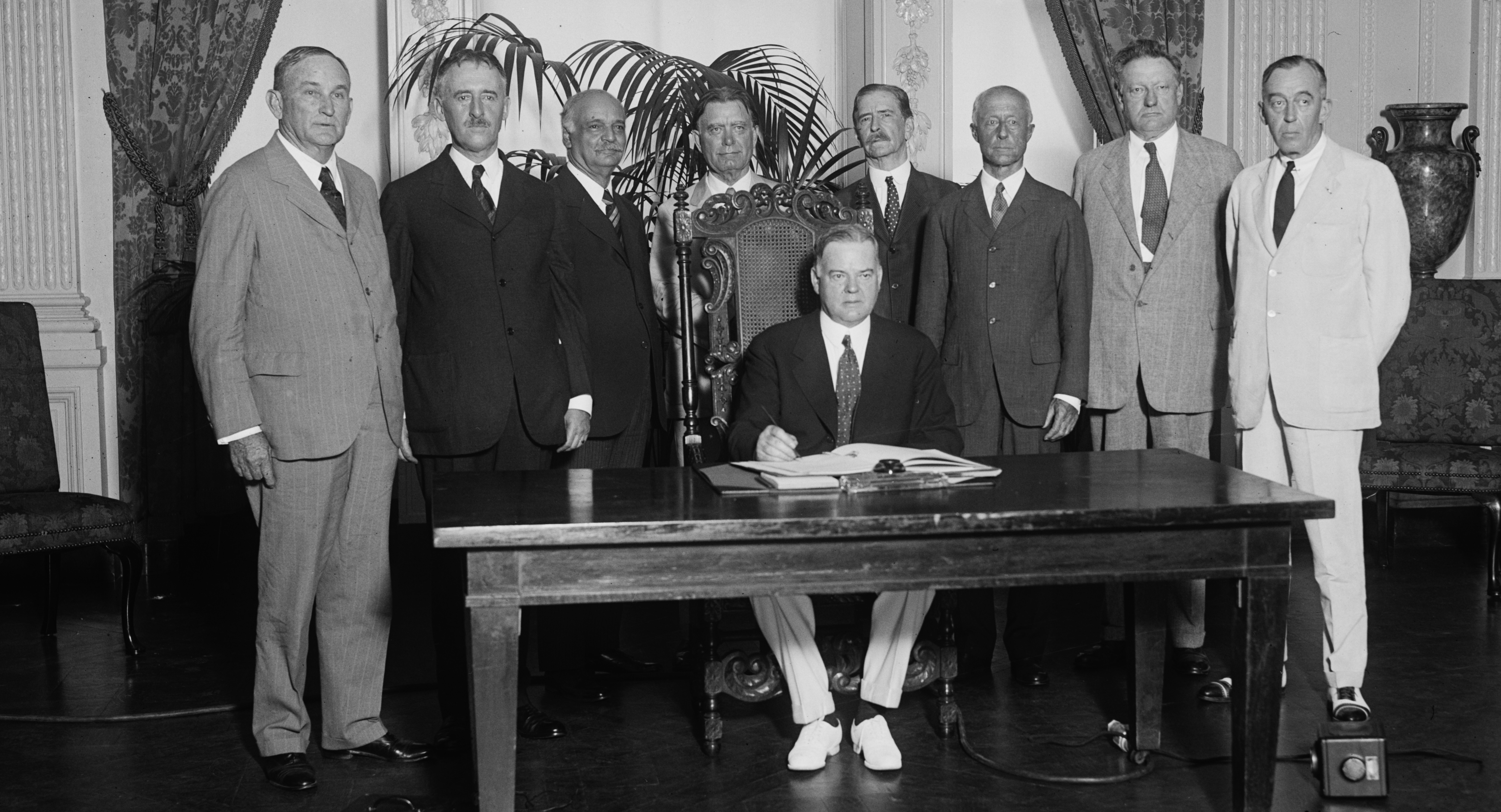
Hoover (seated) with senators and cabinet officers, 1930. Borah stands directly behind his chair.

Borah was not personally harmed by the stock market crash of October 1929, having sold any stocks and invested in government bonds. Thousands of Americans had borrowed on margin, and were ruined by the crash. Congress in June 1930 passed the Hawley–Smoot Tariff, sharply increasing rates on imports. Borah was one of 12 Republicans who joined Democrats in opposing the bill, which passed the Senate 44–42. Borah was up for election in 1930, and despite a minimal campaign effort, took over 70 percent of the vote in a bad year for Republicans. When he returned to Washington for the lame-duck session of the Senate beginning in December, Borah pressed the passage of legislation that would help business and suggested that members of Congress turn back their salary to the Treasury. The economy continued to worsen in the winter of 1931, and Borah urged relief legislation, stating that opponents argued "that for the Government to feed this woman and her sick children would destroy her self respect and make a bad citizen of her. Does anyone believe it? It is a cowardly imputation on the helpless. I resent it and I repudiate it."

When Congress reconvened in December 1931, the Republicans nominally controlled the Senate by the tie-breaking vote of Vice President Charles Curtis, but, as Hoover later wrote, there was no real majority as Borah and other progressives were against the administration. After the Bonus Army marched on Washington, Borah and Hoover agreed that no action should be taken on their demands so long as the ex-soldiers remained in the capital. Borah considered their presence intimidating to Congress, but was angered when they were forcibly dispersed.

Borah considered challenging Hoover for renomination in 1932, but concluded the president's control over the party machinery, especially in the South, could not be overcome. Borah disagreed with the platform of the 1932 Republican National Convention over Prohibition; after the party passed a vague compromise plank and renominated Hoover, Borah made a major address on June 20, gaining nationwide attention by attacking his party's platform for forty minutes. Between then and November, he rarely mentioned Hoover's name publicly, though he said late in the campaign that he would vote for the president. He made speeches discussing issues, not candidates, and did nothing to aid Hoover's doomed campaign against Franklin D. Roosevelt. When some Idahoans demanded that he support Hoover on pain of being opposed for renomination for Senate in 1936, Borah responded that he regretted if his quarter century in the Senate had left them with the impression he might be moved by such an ultimatum.

The Democratic landslide that accompanied Roosevelt's election cost Borah his chairmanship of the Foreign Relations Committee, but much of his influence was independent of party. Borah liked Roosevelt for his liberalism and his energy. Due to illness, Borah took only a limited role in Roosevelt's Hundred Days, though he did play a key part in the passage of Glass–Steagall in June 1933, helping forge a compromise that ended the opponents' filibuster. He opposed Roosevelt's calling in of gold, alleging that the government had no power to tell individuals what to do with their money. Borah opposed the National Recovery Act (NRA) and was gratified when it was struck down by the Supreme Court in 1935. Borah's fifteen-year fight for the recognition of the USSR ended in 1933 when Roosevelt opened diplomatic relations.

=== 1936 presidential campaign and final years ===
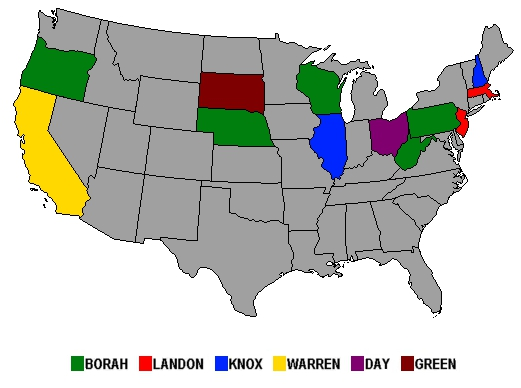
Few states had presidential primaries in 1936. Those won by Borah are in green.

Borah ran for the Republican nomination for president in 1936, the first from Idaho to do so. His candidacy was opposed by the conservative Republican leadership. Borah praised Roosevelt for some of his policies, and deeply criticized the Republican Party. With only 25 Republicans left in the Senate, Borah saw an opportunity to recast the Republican Party along progressive lines, as he had long sought to do. He was opposed by the Republican organization, which sought to dilute his strength in the primaries by running state favorite son candidates in order to ensure a brokered convention. Despite being easily the leading primary vote-getter, Borah managed to win only a handful of delegates and took a majority of them in only one state, Wisconsin, where he had the endorsement of Senator Robert M. La Follette, Jr. Borah refused to endorse the eventual candidate, Kansas Governor Alf Landon (who was nominated at the 1936 Republican National Convention), leading some to believe Borah might cross party lines and support Roosevelt. Ultimately, as he had four years earlier, he chose to endorse neither candidate. Borah was on the ballot that fall in Idaho, seeking a sixth term in the Senate. For the first time since the people had been given the right to elect senators, the Democrats ran a serious candidate against him, Governor C. Ben Ross. Although Idahoans overwhelmingly voted for Roosevelt, who won every state except Maine and Vermont, Borah still took over sixty percent of their votes in his re-election bid.

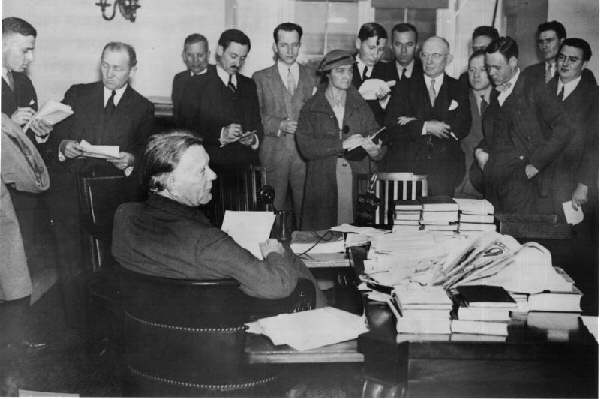
Borah (seated) holds a press conference, 1935

Only sixteen Republicans remained in the Senate, most progressives, when Congress met in January 1937, but Borah retained much influence as he was liked and respected by Democrats. Many of Roosevelt's New Deal policies, such as the NRA, were struck down by the U.S. Supreme Court during Roosevelt's first term, but he had no opportunities to make an appointment to the court in his first four years. In 1937, Roosevelt proposed what came to be known as the court-packing scheme, that for every justice over the age of seventy, an additional one could be appointed. This would give Roosevelt six picks, but would require Congress to pass legislation, which Borah was immediately opposed, believing it would be the death of the Supreme Court as an independent institution. Although he refused to take the lead in the bipartisan opposition, Borah wrote a section of the committee report dealing with the history and independence of the court. When the matter came to the Senate floor, Borah was asked to make the opening speech, but again deferred to the Democratic majority, and Roosevelt's plan was defeated. The court crisis had also been defused by the retirement of the Senior Associate Justice, Willis Van Devanter, a Taft appointee. When Borah was asked if he had played a role in Van Devanter's retirement, he responded, "Well, guess for yourself. We live in the same apartment house."

After Hitler took control in Germany in 1933, Borah thought well of the new chancellor's repudiation of the war guilt and other clauses of the Versailles treaty, and saw much of value in his new social and economic programs. Despite the Nazi mistreatment of the Jews, Borah did not speak out against Nazi Germany, though many urged him to do so, as he felt that each nation had the right to run its own affairs. Borah opposed large-scale immigration by Jews from Germany, feeling that was "impractical with millions of Americans unemployed". By 1938, Borah was speaking out against the continued persecutions, but still felt that the European issue could be settled if Germany's former colonies were returned. After the Munich Conference in September 1938, Borah issued a statement far more critical of Britain and France for deceiving Czechoslovakia into dismemberment, than of Germany for her aggression.

Borah sought to visit Germany and see Hitler, hoping to settle the troubled international situation. He approached the German Embassy in Washington through intermediaries, and the Germans approved the trip, and even offered to pay, something Borah was unwilling to accept. Borah realized that such a journey would compromise him in foreign policy debates, and did not go; by August 1939, the U.S. was seeking to evacuate its citizens from Europe and the journey was no longer feasible. in September 1939, after Germany invaded Poland, and World War II began, Borah mourned, "Lord, if I could only have talked to Hitler—all this might have been averted." This was said to William Kinsey Hutchinson, then International News Service's Washington Bureau Chief. Hutchinson indicated that Borah confided this "in words that ran like a prayer". McKenna noted, "It was fortuitous that the march of events prevented Borah from joining those pacifists and liberals ... who trudged up the hill to Berchtesgaden to lay before the Fuehrer their plans for world peace".

== Death ==
Midway through his sixth term on January 19, 1940, Borah died in his sleep of a cerebral hemorrhage at age 74 at his home in Washington, D.C. His state funeral at the U.S. Capitol was held in the Senate chamber on January 22. A second funeral was held three days later at the Idaho State Capitol in Boise, where Borah's casket lay beneath the rotunda for six hours prior to the service. An estimated 23,000 passed by the bier or attended the funeral; Boise's population in 1940 was just over 26,100. He is buried in Morris Hill Cemetery in Boise.

The tributes to Borah on his death were many. William Gibbs McAdoo, a former Democratic senator, stated "You don't have to agree with every position taken to concede that he was an intellectual giant and one of the truly great men of our times." Ernest K. Lindley deemed Borah the "most effectively liberal voice in the Republican Party." Nazi propaganda minister Joseph Goebbels' paper, Der Angriff, asserted, "American life loses a personality valued by friend or foe on account of his courage, honesty, and decent method of fighting." Borah's old classmate, Kansas editor William Allen White, called him "a righteous man who was wise and unafraid, who followed his star, never lowered his flag, and never lost his self-respect ... an honest man who dedicated his talents to his country's good." Columnist Raymond Clapper mourned, "there are no fighters on the progressive side [of the Republican Party]—no men like T.R. ... Borah was the last."

== Marriage and family ==
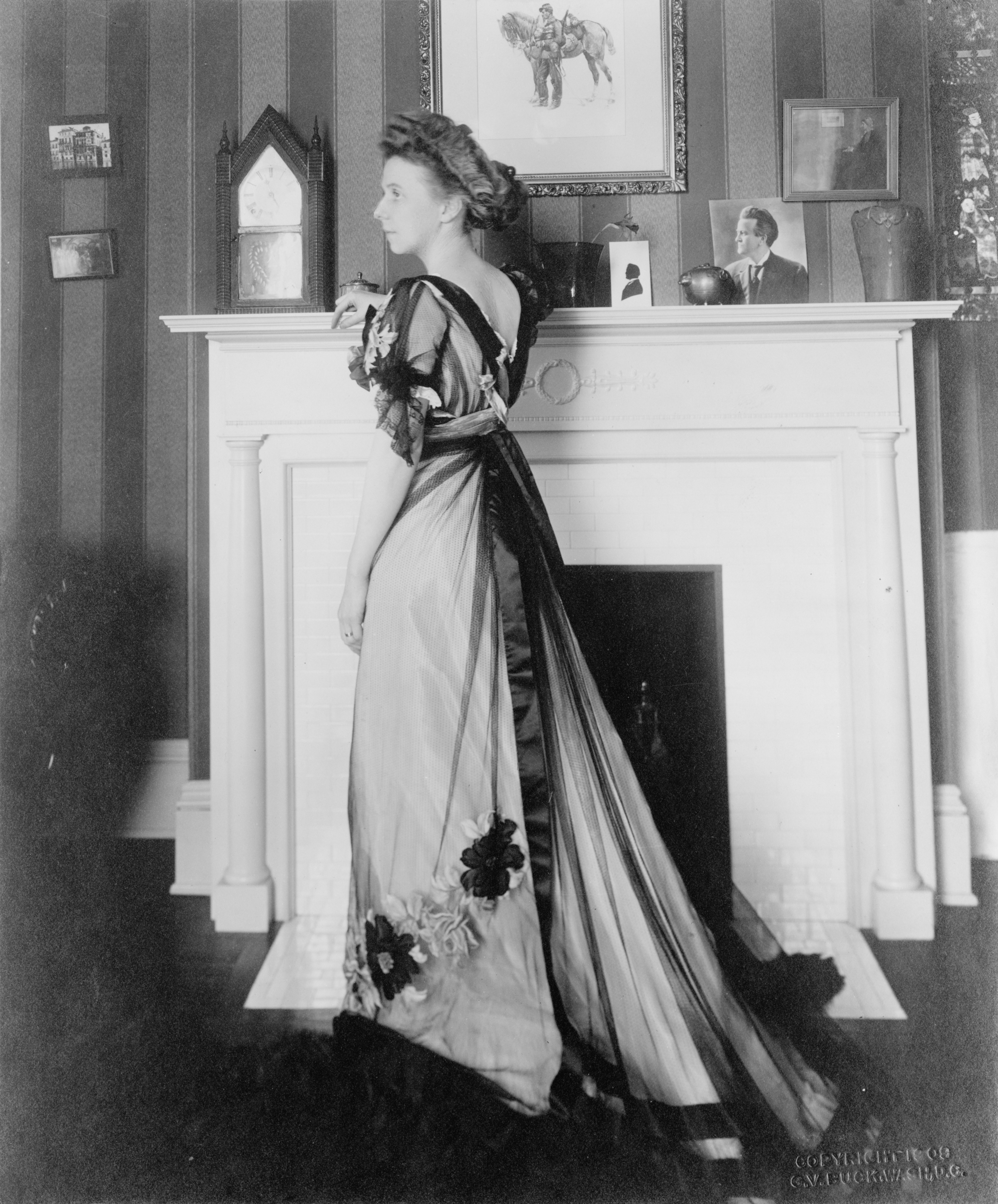
Mary McConnell Borah, c. 1909

In 1895, Borah married Mary McConnell of Moscow, Idaho, daughter of Governor William J. McConnell. They first met in Moscow while he was campaigning for her father. They had no children. Mary lived in Washington, D.C., into the 1960s; and died in 1976 at the age of 105. Small and elegant, she was commonly known as "Little Borah".

Borah had an affair with his close friend Alice Roosevelt Longworth, the eldest child of Theodore Roosevelt. He was the biological father of her daughter, Paulina Longworth Sturm (1925–1957). One family friend said of Paulina, "everybody called her 'Aurora Borah Alice.'"

== Sites, memorials and cultural effect ==
In 1947, the state of Idaho presented a bronze statue of Borah to the National Statuary Hall Collection, sculpted by Bryant Baker. Idaho's highest point, Borah Peak, at 12,662 feet (3,859 m) was named for him in 1934, while he was dean of the Senate. Two public schools are named for him: Borah High School in Boise, opened in 1958, and Borah Elementary School in Coeur d'Alene. William E. Borah Apartment, Windsor Lodge, his longtime home in Washington (Note: Borah did not maintain a home in Idaho after his election to the Senate, staying at a hotel or with friends when he returned to the state.) was designated a U.S. National Historic Landmark in 1976.

Borah was the subject of a 1963 episode, "The Lion of Idaho", of the syndicated television anthology series Death Valley Days. In the episode, Borah as a young attorney (played by Steve Forrest) defends a woman in Nampa on a murder charge.

At the University of Idaho, an annual symposium on international problems and policy is held by the Borah Foundation, which operates under the university's auspices. The symposium is intended to honor Borah's memory "by considering the causes of war and the conditions necessary for peace in an international context". The inaugural edition was held in September 1931, and included Borah himself. Also affiliated with the university is the William Edgar Borah Outlawry of War Foundation, which was funded by a donation from Borah's colleague in the outlawry movement, Salmon Levinson, in 1929.

== Appraisal and legacy ==
I would sooner lose in a right cause than win in a wrong cause. As long as I can distinguish between right and wrong, I shall do what I believe to be right—whatever the consequences.

— William E. Borah

Borah's biographer, McKenna, deemed him "an idealist, even a romantic. He fervently defended the idea of an innocent America, an America too much devoted to the principles stated in the Declaration of Independence, Washington's Farewell Address, Jefferson's First Inaugural, and the Gettysburg Address to risk a compromise of its faith and a coarsening of its character by active entanglement with the Old World." John Chalmers Vinson, in his volume on Borah's involvement with the war outlawry movement, believed that the senator "spoke for a large part of the American public. He was the archetype of absolute insistence on unfettered national will that has been loosely described as isolationism. Further, he represented the struggle to preserve in full the traditions of a small republic remote from strong neighbors against the inroads of recurring crises faced by a world power." According to LeRoy Ashby in his book on Borah, he "emerged as one of the major figures in American reform politics [and] reached the peak of his prestige and influence during the Twenties". Maddox noted that "almost as suspicious of U.S. presidents as he was of foreign nations, Borah perceived threats everywhere".

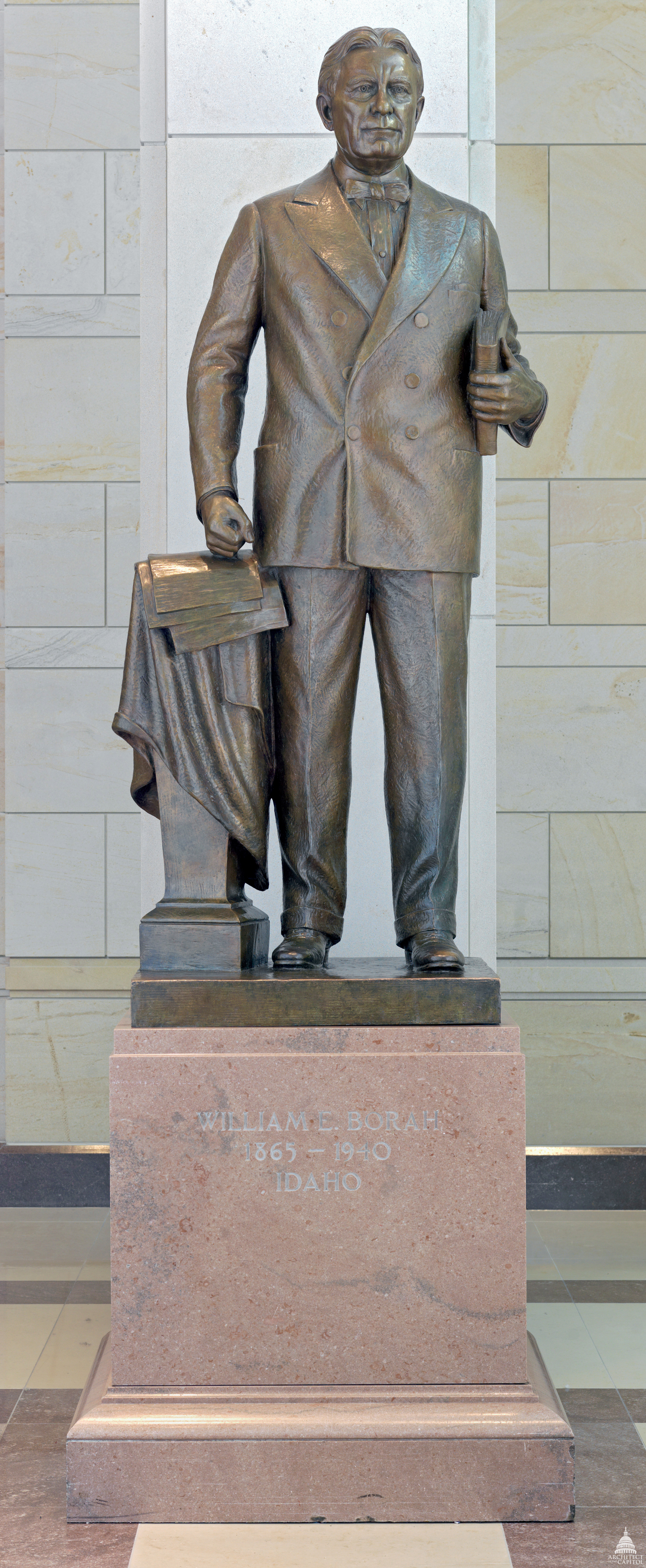
Statue of Borah in the US Capitol by Bryant Baker, 1947

Borah's effectiveness as a reformer was undercut by his tendency to abandon causes after initial enthusiasm, as Maddox put it, "although he was very skilled at speaking out, his unwillingness to do more than protest eventually earned him a reputation for futility." H. L. Mencken in 1925 deemed Borah "the Great Sham", and the one most responsible for stopping reform in its tracks. Harold L. Ickes wrote, most likely after the 1928 campaign, that progressives in the Senate, with no illusions left about Borah, called him "our spearless leader". Theodore Roosevelt described Borah as "entirely insincere", an insurgent whose chief talent was to "insurge".

Although Borah's career bridged two eras of reform, according to Ashby, "emotionally and intellectually he belonged with the older prewar [that is, pre-World War I] America. As New Deal enthusiast Edgar Kemler observed, he 'was overtaken by obsolescence at an early age'." Borah wrote in 1927, near the end of a decade of tumultuous change, "I cannot think of any views which I now have that I did not have before the war." In 1936, Time magazine noted that though Borah was the most famous senator of the century, and had long been "the great Moral Force of the Senate ... the conscience of the country has been placed in other pockets".

McKenna saw more than Borah becoming an antique in his own time, she saw damage inflicted by his positions: "time was to demonstrate the utter bankruptcy of the narrow nationalistic policy which the irreconcilables decreed and to which the Harding, Coolidge, and Hoover administrations submitted with such disastrous results." Borah's comment regretting that he could not have talked to Hitler has been repeatedly cited as evidence of naiveté in those who believe in the power of pure diplomacy. Conservative commentator Charles Krauthammer referred to the statement in at least three of his columns, making an analogy to negotiating with China in 1989, with North Korea in 1994 and with Iran in 2006, and it was cited disparagingly in a 2006 speech by Secretary of Defense Donald Rumsfeld.

Criticism of Borah meant little to the people of Idaho, who sent him to the Senate six times over thirty years in a rapidly changing America. Claudius O. Johnson, who studied Borah, explained their relationship:

The Idaho people knew ... that he was very easy to approach, "as plain as an old shoe"; that he would listen at length to their problems, help if he could, say "No" if he must, and always show sympathetic understanding. That was his strength with the people—his simplicity, his approachability, his kindliness, his human sympathy ... In him they found release from their own verbal inhibitions; through him they felt their own strength. They were lovers of freedom, as independent as the hills and the canyons. This freedom and independence Borah proclaimed, and they understood ... He understood them, admired them, believed in them. They were his friends. In them he found inspiration and strength.

== Sources ==
- Ashby, LeRoy (1972). The Spearless Leader: Senator Borah and the Progressive Movement in the 1920s. Urbana IL: University of Illinois Press. ISBN 978-0-252-00220-5.
- Braden, Waldo W. (June 1947). "Some Illinois Influences on the Life of William E. Borah". Journal of the Illinois State Historical Society. 40 (2): 168–175. JSTOR 40188261.
- Cook, Rufus G. (October 1969). "The Political Suicide of Senator Fred T. Dubois of Idaho". The Pacific Northwest Quarterly. 60 (4): 193–198. JSTOR 40488686.
- DeBenedetti, Charles. "Borah and the Kellogg-Briand Pact." Pacific Northwest Quarterly 63.1 (1972): 22–29.
- Grover, David H. (February 1963). "Borah and the Haywood Trial". Pacific Historical Review. 32 (1): 65–77. doi:10.2307/4492129. JSTOR 4492129.
- Hutchinson, William K. (February 29, 1940). News Articles on the Life and Works of Honorable William E. Borah, Late a Senator from the State of Idaho. Washington DC: United States Government Printing Office.
- Johnson, Claudius O. (June 1943). "When William E. Borah Was Defeated for the United States Senate". The Pacific Historical Review. 12 (2): 125–138. doi:10.2307/3634181. JSTOR 3634181.
- Johnson, Claudius O. (January 1953). "William E. Borah: The People's Choice". The Pacific Northwest Quarterly. 44 (1): 15–22. JSTOR 40486998.
- Maddox, Robert James (March 1967). "Keeping Cool with Coolidge". The Journal of American History. 53 (4): 772–80. doi:10.2307/1893991. JSTOR 1893991.
- Maddox, Robert James (1969). William E. Borah and American Foreign Policy. Baton Rouge: Louisiana State University Press. ISBN 978-0-8071-0907-6.
- McKenna, Marian C. (1961). Borah. Ann Arbor MI: The University of Michigan Press. OCLC 456617.
- Nichols, Christopher McKnight (2011). Promise and Peril : America at the Dawn of a Global Age (eBook ed.). Cambridge MA: Harvard University Press. ISBN 978-0-674-06118-7.
- Vinson, John Chalmers (1957). William E. Borah and the Outlawry of War. Athens GA: The University of Georgia Press. OCLC 484484.
- Weaver, John D. (1997). The Senator and the Sharecropper's Son: Exoneration of the Brownsville Soldiers. College Station, Texas: Texas A&M University Press. ISBN 978-0-89096-748-5.

Party political offices
First	Republican nominee for U.S. Senator from Idaho (Class 2); 1918, 1924, 1930, 1936	Succeeded by John Thomas
U.S. Senate
Preceded by Fred Dubois	United States Senator (Class 2) from Idaho; 1907–1940; Served alongside: Weldon Heyburn, Kirtland I. Perky, James H. Brady, John F. Nugent, Frank R. Gooding, John Thomas, James P. Pope, Worth Clark	Succeeded by John Thomas
Preceded by Jonathan P. Dolliver	Chair of the Senate Education Committee; 1909–1913	Succeeded by M. Hoke Smith
Preceded by Robert Owen	Chair of the Senate Indian Depredations Committee; 1913–1917	Succeeded by Miles Poindexter
Preceded by George Sutherland	Chair of the Senate Justice Department Expenditures Committee; 1917–1919	Succeeded by Wallace White
Preceded by John K. Shields	Chair of the Senate Interoceanic Canals Committee; 1919–1922	Succeeded by Walter Edge
Preceded by William Kenyon	Chair of the Senate Education Committee; 1922–1924	Succeeded by Lawrence C. Phipps
Preceded by Henry Cabot Lodge	Chair of the Senate Foreign Relations Committee; 1924–1933	Succeeded by Key Pittman
Awards and achievements
Preceded by Gelasio Caetani	Cover of Time; May 5, 1924	Succeeded by Homer Saint-Gaudens
Honorary titles
Preceded by Reed Smoot	Dean of the United States Senate; 1933–1940	Succeeded by Ellison D. Smith
