= Fairfield, Illinois =

- City
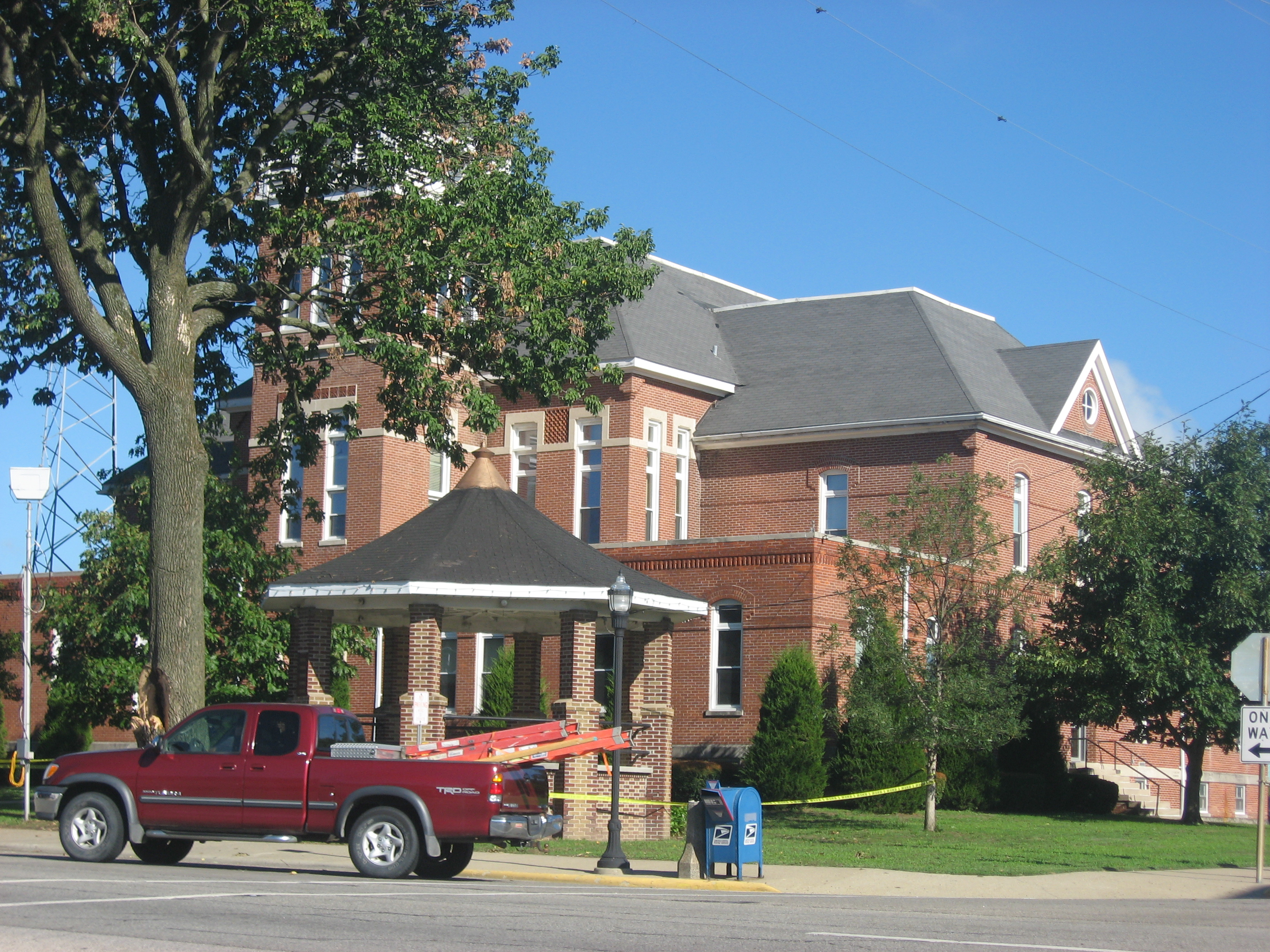
- Wayne County Courthouse
- Motto: "Home of the Friendly People"
- Interactive map of Fairfield, Illinois
- Location within Illinois Location within the United States
- Coordinates: 38°22′35″N 88°22′28″W
- Country: United States
- State: Illinois
- County: Wayne

Area
  - Total: 4.06 sq mi (10.52 km^{2})
  - Land: 4.03 sq mi (10.43 km^{2})
  - Water: 0.035 sq mi (0.09 km^{2})
- Elevation: 459 ft (140 m)

Population (2020)
  - Total: 4,883
  - Density: 1,212.2/sq mi (468.02/km^{2})
- Time zone: UTC-6 (CST)
  - Summer (DST): UTC-5 (CDT)
- ZIP code: 62837
- Area code: 618
- FIPS code: 17–24816
- GNIS feature ID: 2394732
- Website: cityoffairfieldillinois.com

Fairfield is a city in and the county seat of Wayne County, Illinois, United States. The population was 4,883 at the 2020 census. Frontier Community College is located in the city.

== History ==
Fairfield is most famous for being the hometown of the "friendly" people, and for the Shelton Brothers Gang, notorious bootleggers who fought it out with the Harrisburg, Illinois-based Birger Gang to control criminal activities in Southern Illinois. During the first half of the 20th century, gang leaders Carl, Earl and Bernie Shelton made Fairfield a household name. Based on testimony of Charlie Birger himself, the Shelton Brothers were convicted for a 1925 unsolved mail carrier robbery of $15,000 and were sentenced to 25 years. They were released a few years later. Birger dominated bootlegging in Southern Illinois until he himself was hanged in Benton for the murder of West City Mayor Joe Adams in 1928. After serving their time, the Shelton brothers built a new criminal empire. Based in East St Louis, one of the most prosperous cities of its day, they controlled all vice from Peoria and southward.

They met their demise at the hands of the Chicago mob and an insider Charles "Blackie" Harris. A land dispute led to Blackie joining forces with the Mob to kill off members of the Shelton gang. His most notable victim was Carl Shelton, the leader. He was ambushed several miles southeast of Fairfield, shot from his Jeep. Bernie was killed at his Peoria roadhouse. Earl moved to Jacksonville, Florida and became a successful land speculator.

== Geography ==
According to the 2010 census, Fairfield has a total area of 4.054 square miles (10.50 km^{2}), of which 4.02 square miles (10.41 km^{2}) (or 99.16%) is land and 0.034 square miles (0.09 km^{2}) (or 0.84%) is water.

=== Climate ===
Climate data for Fairfield, Illinois (1991–2020 normals, extremes 1896–present)
Month	Jan	Feb	Mar	Apr	May	Jun	Jul	Aug	Sep	Oct	Nov	Dec	Year
Record high °F (°C)	77 (25)	78 (26)	91 (33)	91 (33)	98 (37)	108 (42)	113 (45)	108 (42)	105 (41)	96 (36)	86 (30)	74 (23)	113 (45)
Mean daily maximum °F (°C)	41.1 (5.1)	46.5 (8.1)	57.0 (13.9)	69.0 (20.6)	78.1 (25.6)	86.9 (30.5)	89.6 (32.0)	88.8 (31.6)	82.6 (28.1)	70.5 (21.4)	56.1 (13.4)	45.0 (7.2)	67.6 (19.8)
Daily mean °F (°C)	32.8 (0.4)	37.2 (2.9)	46.6 (8.1)	57.7 (14.3)	67.0 (19.4)	75.6 (24.2)	78.7 (25.9)	77.2 (25.1)	70.2 (21.2)	58.8 (14.9)	46.2 (7.9)	36.9 (2.7)	57.1 (13.9)
Mean daily minimum °F (°C)	24.5 (−4.2)	27.9 (−2.3)	36.3 (2.4)	46.5 (8.1)	55.9 (13.3)	64.3 (17.9)	67.8 (19.9)	65.6 (18.7)	57.9 (14.4)	47.0 (8.3)	36.3 (2.4)	28.8 (−1.8)	46.6 (8.1)
Record low °F (°C)	−23 (−31)	−21 (−29)	−8 (−22)	17 (−8)	29 (−2)	39 (4)	45 (7)	43 (6)	25 (−4)	19 (−7)	−3 (−19)	−18 (−28)	−23 (−31)
Average precipitation inches (mm)	3.33 (85)	2.68 (68)	4.22 (107)	5.00 (127)	4.98 (126)	4.70 (119)	3.83 (97)	3.51 (89)	2.90 (74)	3.73 (95)	3.82 (97)	3.30 (84)	46.00 (1,168)
Average precipitation days (≥ 0.01 in)	9.2	8.4	10.7	11.2	12.2	10.1	8.5	7.4	6.6	8.1	9.2	9.7	111.3
Source: NOAA

== Demographics ==
Historical population
Census	Pop.	Note	%±
1850	195		—
1860	508		160.5%
1870	719		41.5%
1880	1,391		93.5%
1890	1,881		35.2%
1900	2,338		24.3%
1910	2,479		6.0%
1920	2,754		11.1%
1930	3,280		19.1%
1940	4,008		22.2%
1950	5,576		39.1%
1960	6,362		14.1%
1970	5,897		−7.3%
1980	5,944		0.8%
1990	5,439		−8.5%
2000	5,421		−0.3%
2010	5,154		−4.9%
2020	4,883		−5.3%
U.S. Decennial Census

=== 2020 census ===
As of the 2020 census, Fairfield had a population of 4,883. The median age was 45.3 years. 21.3% of residents were under the age of 18 and 24.8% of residents were 65 years of age or older. For every 100 females there were 85.7 males, and for every 100 females age 18 and over there were 84.1 males age 18 and over.

97.0% of residents lived in urban areas, while 3.0% lived in rural areas.

There were 2,234 households in Fairfield, of which 23.2% had children under the age of 18 living in them. Of all households, 38.4% were married-couple households, 19.4% were households with a male householder and no spouse or partner present, and 35.8% were households with a female householder and no spouse or partner present. About 39.6% of all households were made up of individuals and 21.6% had someone living alone who was 65 years of age or older.

There were 2,570 housing units, of which 13.1% were vacant. The homeowner vacancy rate was 3.9% and the rental vacancy rate was 12.6%.

Racial composition as of the 2020 census
Race	Number	Percent
White	4,615	94.5%
Black or African American	66	1.4%
American Indian and Alaska Native	19	0.4%
Asian	17	0.3%
Native Hawaiian and Other Pacific Islander	0	0.0%
Some other race	35	0.7%
Two or more races	131	2.7%
Hispanic or Latino (of any race)	67	1.4%

=== 2000 census ===
As of the census of 2000, there were 5,421 people, 2,495 households, and 1,494 families residing in the city. The population density was 1,499.0 inhabitants per square mile (578.8/km^{2}). There were 2,727 housing units at an average density of 754.0 units per square mile (291.1 units/km^{2}). The racial makeup of the city was 98.40% White, 0.09% African American, 0.26% Native American, 0.63% Asian, 0.02% Pacific Islander, 0.06% from other races, and 0.55% from two or more races. Hispanic or Latino of any race were 0.42% of the population.

There were 2,495 households, out of which 24.8% had children under the age of 18 living with them, 46.4% were married couples living together, 10.8% had a female householder with no husband present, and 40.1% were non-families. 37.0% of all households were made up of individuals, and 21.3% had someone living alone who was 65 years of age or older. The average household size was 2.11 and the average family size was 2.74.

In the city, the population was spread out, with 20.5% under the age of 18, 8.0% from 18 to 24, 24.1% from 25 to 44, 22.4% from 45 to 64, and 24.9% who were 65 years of age or older. The median age was 43 years. For every 100 females, there were 82.1 males. For every 100 females age 18 and over, there were 77.6 males.

The median income for a household in the city was $25,797, and the median income for a family was $36,278. Males had a median income of $28,866 versus $19,985 for females. The per capita income for the city was $16,791. About 8.5% of families and 13.1% of the population were below the poverty line, including 16.7% of those under age 18 and 9.6% of those age 65 or over.

== Education ==
- Center Street School
- North Side School
- Fairfield Community High School
- Frontier Community College

== Notable people ==
- Ben C. Blades, Illinois state legislator
- Carroll C. Boggs, Illinois Supreme Court justice
- William Borah, Senator known as the "Lion of Idaho"
- H. S. Burgess, Illinois state legislator and lawyer; served as mayor of Fairfield
- Charles W. Creighton, Illinois state representative and lawyer.
- Thomas H. Creighton, Illinois state representative and lawyer
- Kenneth Michael Kays, recipient of the Medal of Honor for heroism during the Vietnam War
- Drue Pearce, Alaska state legislator
- Clyde W. Robbins, farmer and Illinois state representative
