= Statue of William Borah =

Statue by Bryant Baker

William Borah
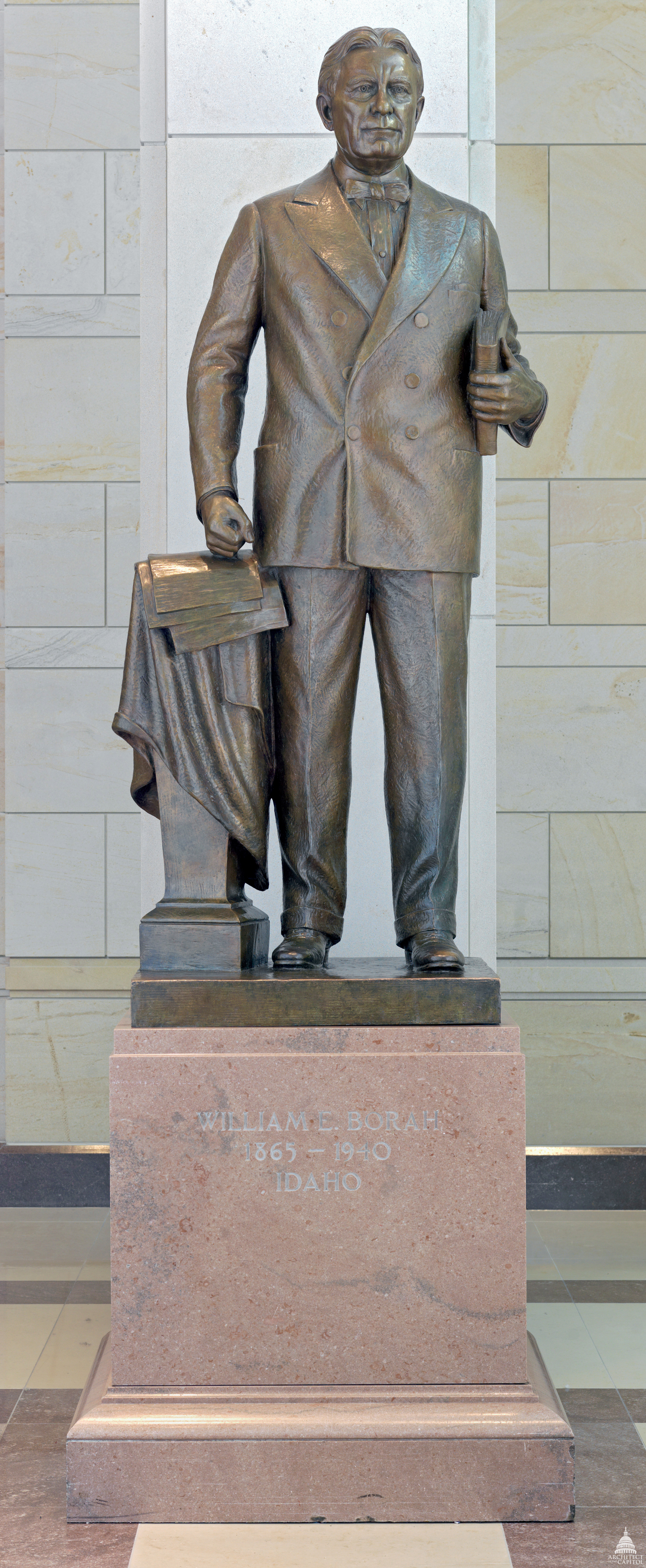
- Artist: Bryant Baker
- Medium: Bronze sculpture
- Subject: William Borah
- Location: Washington, D.C., United States

William Borah is a bronze sculpture depicting the American politician of the same name by Bryant Baker, installed in the United States Capitol Visitor Center's Emancipation Room, in Washington, D.C., as part of the National Statuary Hall Collection. The statue was gifted by the U.S. state of Idaho in 1947.

The statue is one of three that Baker has had placed in the Collection.

== See also ==
- 1947 in art
