= Clyde W. Robbins =

American farmer and politician

Clyde W. Robbins (June 7, 1926–July 20, 2001) was an American farmer and politician.

Robbins was born in Akron, Ohio. He moved with his family to Wayne County, Illinois and settled in Geff, Illinois. Robbins went to the Wayne County public schools. Robbins was a farmer and raised cattle in rural Fairfield, Illinois. He was involved with the Republican Party. Robbins served on the Geff School Board. He served in the Illinois House of Representatives from 1979 to 1982.
