= Wayne County Courthouse (Illinois) =

Local government building in the United States

Coordinates: 38°22′48″N 88°21′26″W

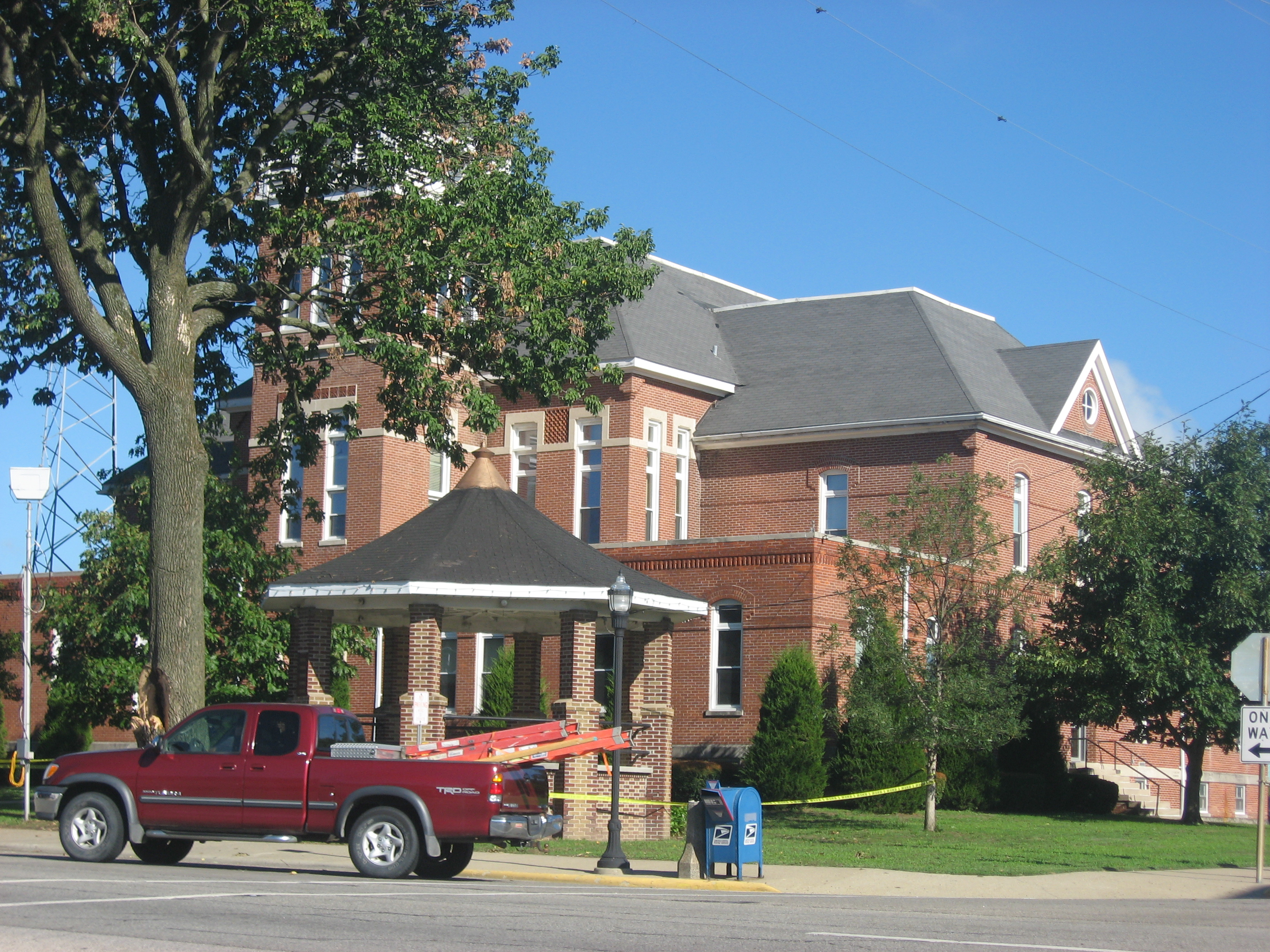
Street view of the courthouse

The Wayne County Courthouse is a historic government building in Fairfield, Illinois, United States. Built to serve Wayne County in the 1890s, it replaced an older building whose capabilities were seen as inadequate.

Wayne County was established by the General Assembly in early 1819, and five men were appointed commissioners to fix the location of the county seat. Before long, a log building was constructed on the public square in Fairfield, but it remained only a short while: county officials arranged for its replacement in 1836. This second courthouse served a wide range of purposes: rooms not needed for routine governmental functions could be rented out, typically for offices for lawyers and other types of businessmen (although a scandal ensued after a barbershop moved into one room during the courthouse's last years). For a time, the courthouse was also made available to churches before they completed their own buildings, but this situation ended after voters elected a slate of county officials who revealed themselves as headstrong infidels by turning out the churches.

Two stories tall, the second courthouse was a brick building with a tower high enough to make it visible throughout the surrounding countryside. By the 1880s, it had become dilapidated and was commonly seen as outmoded in comparison to the newer commercial buildings surrounding it. Meanwhile, Fairfield's wooden buildings were highly susceptible to fire, especially because the community had survived into the 1880s without suffering any substantial blazes. As a result, county officials began to fear the destruction of the old building by fire, so they ordered the construction of a new fireproof hall of records in the 1860s — only to see it burn to the ground in 1886. Between a sense of the old building's outmoded construction, a desire to possess a truly fireproof structure, and the recent scandal over the barbershop in the courthouse, county officials deemed the time right for the construction of a new courthouse, and blueprints for the new building were approved in 1891. This design called for a brick structure with walls 32 feet (9.8 m) high and a spire culminating 128 feet (39 m) above the courthouse lawn. Unlike some other courthouses, which were built around central clock towers, the new Wayne County Courthouse was to have a clock tower on the side, with the main entrance through its base. The completed building cost $24,700.

Built of "Boston" brick, the courthouse features primarily tall rectangular windows in all of its stories. It was modified in the 1950s, as additions were constructed on both sides, and another addition in 1997 installed a new elevator. Another modification has apparently been performed on the spire: comparisons of older and newer photographs demonstrates that the spire was reduced during the twentieth century, but lack of documentation prevents the precise date from being known.
