= H. S. Burgess =

American lawyer and politician

Hampton S. Burgess (December 5, 1866–May 23, 1952) was an American lawyer and politician.

Burgess was born on a farm in Wayne County, Illinois. He went to the Wayne County public schools and to Hayward College in Fairfield, Illinois. He served as state's attorney for Wayne County and as Fairfield city attorney. Burgess served on the Wayne County Board and also served as mayor of Fairfield. Burgess was a Democrat. Burgess served in the Illinois House of Representatives from 1923 to 1925 and from 1941 to 1943. He served in the Illinois Senate from 1925 to 1929 and from 1933 to 1941. Burgess died at his home in Fairfield, Illinois.
