= Thomas H. Creighton =

American lawyer, teacher, and politician

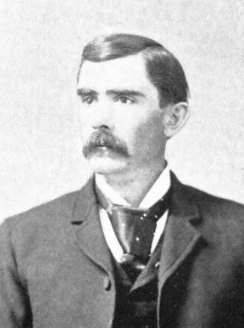

Member of the Illinois House of Representatives
- In office 1893–1894

Personal details
- Born: Thomas Houts Creighton; November 29, 1865 Wayne County, Illinois, US
- Died: November 2, 1942 (aged 76) Evansville, Indiana, US
- Party: Republican
- Occupation: Lawyer, teacher

Thomas Houts Creighton (November 29, 1865 – November 2, 1942) was an American lawyer, teacher, and politician.

== Biography ==
Creighton was born on a farm in Wayne County, Illinois on November 29, 1865, and went to the public schools. He went to the Hayward Collegiate Institute in Fairfield, Illinois and then taught school. Creighton practiced law in Fairfield, Illinois. He served in the Illinois House of Representatives in 1893 and 1894. Creighton was a Republican. Creighton died in a hospital in Evansville, Indiana on November 2, 1942.
