= Jeannette Rankin =

First woman elected to U.S. Congress (1880–1973)

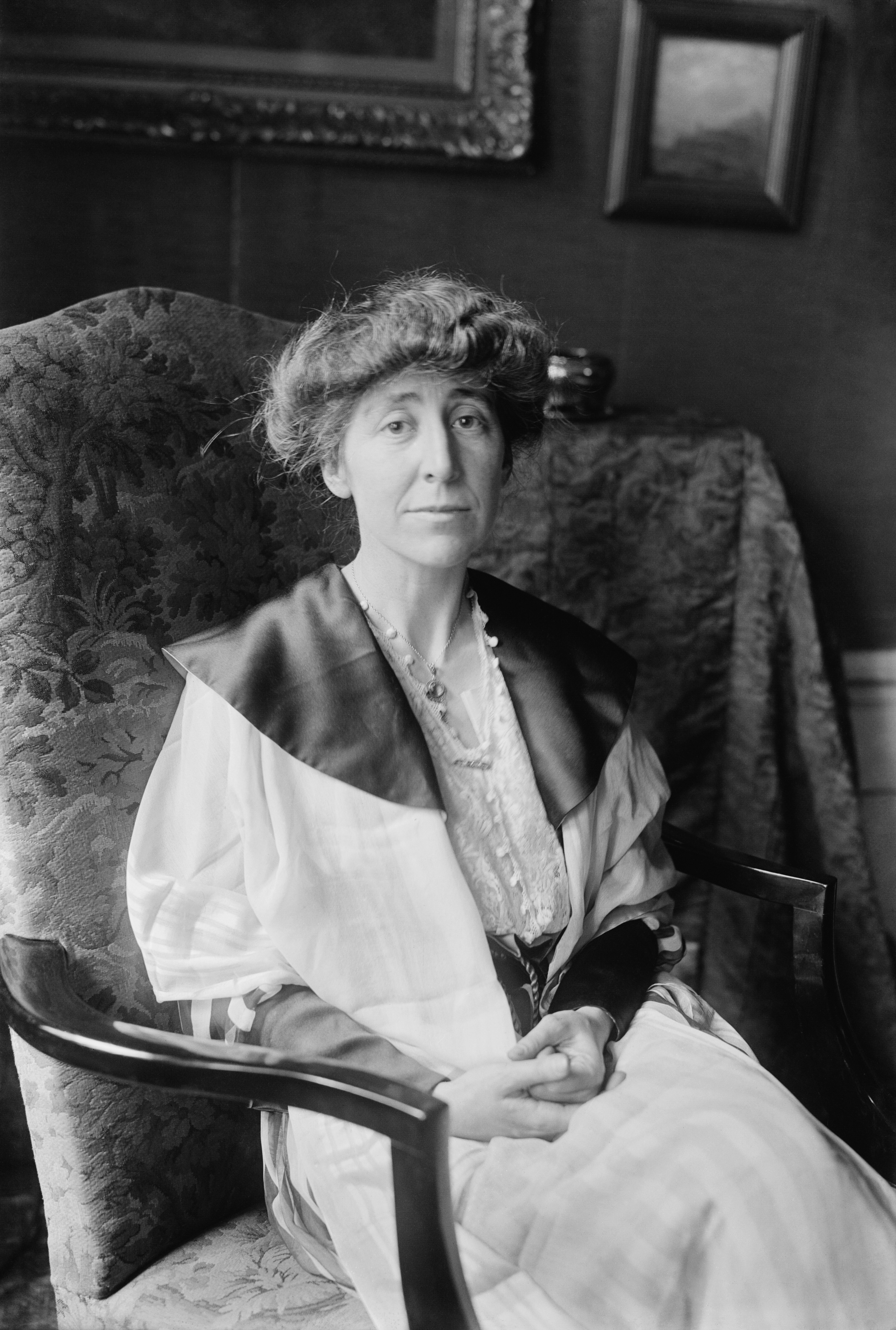
- Rankin in 1917

Member of the U.S. House of Representatives from Montana
- In office January 3, 1941 – January 3, 1943
- Preceded by: Jacob Thorkelson
- Succeeded by: Mike Mansfield
- Constituency: 1st district
- In office March 4, 1917 – March 3, 1919 Serving with John Evans
- Preceded by: Tom Stout
- Succeeded by: John Evans (1st district); Carl Riddick (2nd district)
- Constituency: At-large district

Personal details
- Born: Jeannette Pickering Rankin; June 11, 1880 Missoula County, Montana, U.S.
- Died: May 18, 1973 (aged 92) Carmel, California, U.S.
- Party: Republican
- Other political affiliations: National (1918)
- Education: University of Montana (BS); Columbia University; University of Washington

Jeannette Pickering Rankin (June 11, 1880 – May 18, 1973) was an American politician and women's rights advocate who became the first woman to hold federal office in the United States. She was elected to the U.S. House of Representatives as a Republican from Montana in 1916 for one term, then was elected again in 1940. Rankin remains the only woman ever elected to Congress from Montana.

Each of Rankin's congressional terms coincided with the initiation of U.S. military intervention in both world wars. A lifelong pacifist, she was one of 50 House members who opposed the declaration of war on Germany in 1917. In 1941, she was the sole member of Congress to vote against the declaration of war on Japan following the attack on Pearl Harbor. She remains the last member of Congress to vote against a declaration of war. The last time the United States issued a formal declaration of war was in June 1942, when the United States declared war on Hungary, Romania, and Bulgaria, from which Rankin abstained.

A suffragist during the Progressive Era, Rankin organized and lobbied for legislation enfranchising women in several states, including Montana, New York, and North Dakota. While in Congress, she introduced legislation that eventually became the 19th Constitutional Amendment, granting unrestricted voting rights to 26 million women nationwide. She championed a multitude of diverse women's rights and civil rights causes throughout a career that spanned more than six decades. In 1920, she helped found the American Civil Liberties Union and served as a vice president.

== Early life ==
Rankin was born on June 11, 1880, near Missoula in Montana Territory, nine years before the territory became a state, to school teacher Olive (née Pickering) and Scottish-Canadian immigrant John Rankin, a wealthy mill owner. She was the eldest of seven children, including five sisters (one of whom died in childhood) and a brother, Wellington, who became Montana's attorney general and later, a justice on the Montana Supreme Court. One of her sisters, Edna Rankin McKinnon, became the first Montana-born woman to pass the bar exam in Montana and was an early social activist for access to birth control.

As an adolescent on her family ranch, Rankin had many tasks, including cleaning, sewing, farm chores, outdoor work, and helping care for her younger siblings. She helped maintain the ranch machinery and once single-handedly built a wooden sidewalk for a building her father owned so it could be rented. Rankin later recorded her childhood observation that while women of the 1890s western frontier labored side by side as equals with men, they did not have an equal political voice—nor a legal right to vote.

Rankin graduated from high school in 1898. She studied at the University of Montana and, in 1902, received a Bachelor of Science degree in biology. Before her political and advocacy career, she explored a variety of careers, including dressmaking, furniture design, and teaching. After her father died in 1904, Rankin took on the responsibility of caring for her younger siblings.

== Activism and suffrage movement ==
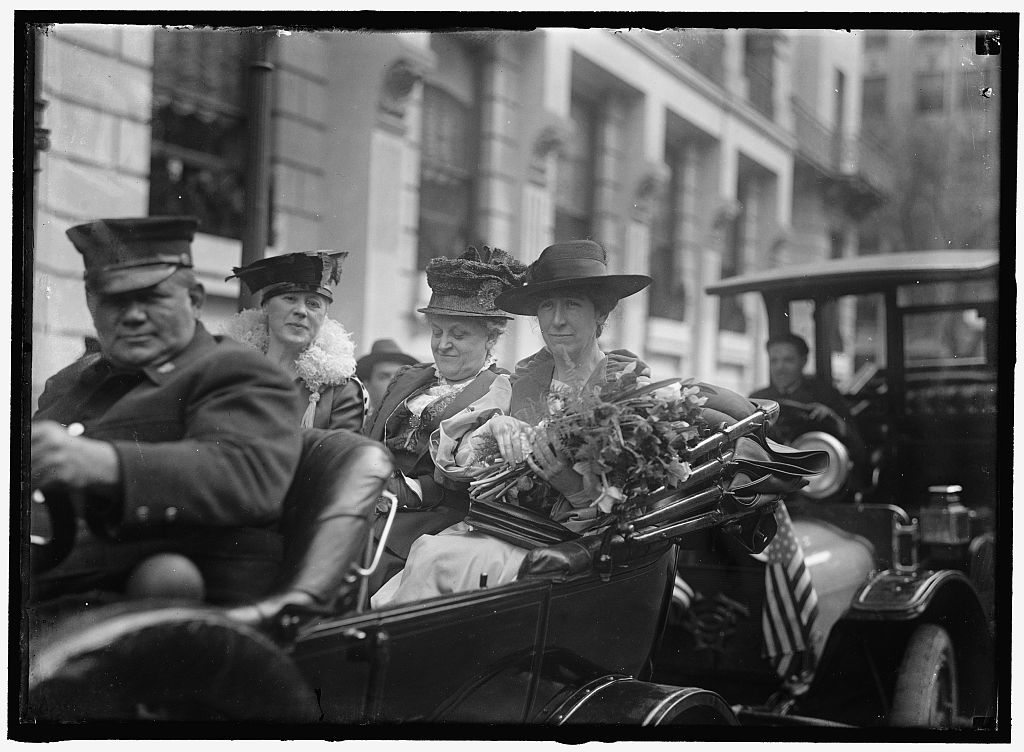
Rankin as a Representative from Montana

At the age of 27, Rankin moved to San Francisco to take a job in social work, a new and developing field. Confident that she had found her calling, she enrolled in the New York School of Philanthropy in New York City (Note: The school later became part of Columbia University School of Social Work) from 1908 to 1909. After a brief period as a social worker in Spokane, Washington, Rankin moved to Seattle to attend the University of Washington, and became involved in the women's suffrage movement. In November 1910, Washington voters approved an amendment to their state constitution to permanently enfranchise women, the fifth state in the Union to do so. Returning to New York, Rankin became one of the organizers of the New York Woman Suffrage Party, which joined with other suffrage organizations to promote a similar suffrage bill in that state's legislature. During this period, Rankin also traveled to Washington to lobby Congress on behalf of the National American Woman Suffrage Association (NAWSA).

Rankin returned to Montana and rose through the ranks of suffrage organizations, becoming the president of the Montana Women's Suffrage Association and the national field secretary of NAWSA. In February 1911, she became the first woman to speak before the Montana legislature, arguing in support of enfranchisement for women in her home state. In November 1914, Montana became the seventh state to grant women unrestricted voting rights. Rankin coordinated the efforts of a variety of grassroots organizations to promote her suffrage campaigns in New York and Montana (and later in North Dakota as well). Later, she would draw from the same grassroots infrastructure during her 1916 congressional campaign.

Rankin later compared her work in the women's suffrage movement to promoting the pacifist foreign policy that defined her congressional career. She believed, as did many suffragists of the period, that the corruption and dysfunction of the United States government resulted from a lack of women's participation. At a disarmament conference during the interwar period, she said, "The peace problem is a woman's problem."

== House of Representatives ==
=== First congressional term ===
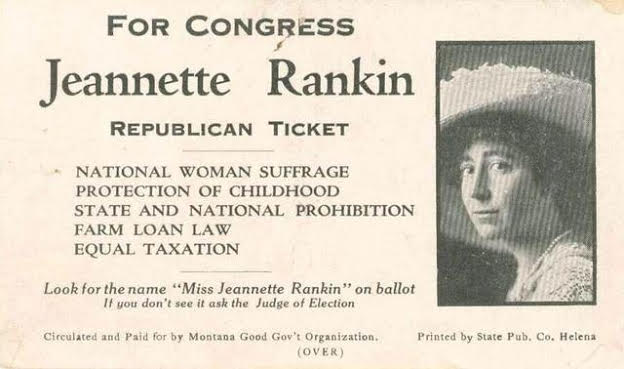
Jeannette Rankin's Republican ticket c. 1917

Rankin's campaign for one of Montana's two at-large House seats in the congressional election of 1916 was financed and managed by her brother Wellington, an influential member of the Montana Republican Party. She traveled long distances to reach the state's widely scattered population. Rankin rallied support at train stations, street corners, potluck suppers on ranches, and remote one-room schoolhouses. She ran as a progressive, emphasizing her support of suffrage, social welfare, and prohibition. Before her election she spoke on several occasions in favor of proportional representation.

In the Republican primary, Rankin received the most votes of the eight Republican candidates. In the at-large general election on November 7, the top two vote-getters won the seats. Rankin finished second in the voting, defeating Frank Bird Linderman, among others, to become the first woman elected to Congress. (Note: Article I, Section 2 of the Constitution requires a representative to live in the "state in which he shall be chosen." In spite of the use of a male pronoun in the Constitution, the House of Representatives decides for itself whether someone is qualified to become a Member, and Rankin was seated without an issue.) During her victory speech, she said, "I am deeply conscious of the responsibility resting upon me" as the only woman in the nation with voting power in Congress. Her election generated considerable nationwide interest, including, reportedly, several marriage proposals.

Shortly after her term began, Congress was called into an extraordinary April session in response to Germany declaring unrestricted submarine warfare on all Atlantic shipping. On April 2, 1917, President Woodrow Wilson, addressing a joint session, asked Congress to "make the world safe for democracy" by declaring war on Germany. After intense debate, the war resolution came to a vote in the House at 3:00 am on April 6; Rankin cast one of 50 votes in opposition. "I wish to stand for my country," she said, "but I cannot vote for war." Years later, she would add, "I felt the first time the first woman had a chance to say no to war, she should say it." Although 49 male Representatives and six Senators also voted against the declaration, Rankin was singled out for criticism. Some considered her vote a discredit to the suffragist movement and her authority in Congress; but others applauded it, including Alice Paul of the National Woman's Party and Representative Fiorello La Guardia of New York.

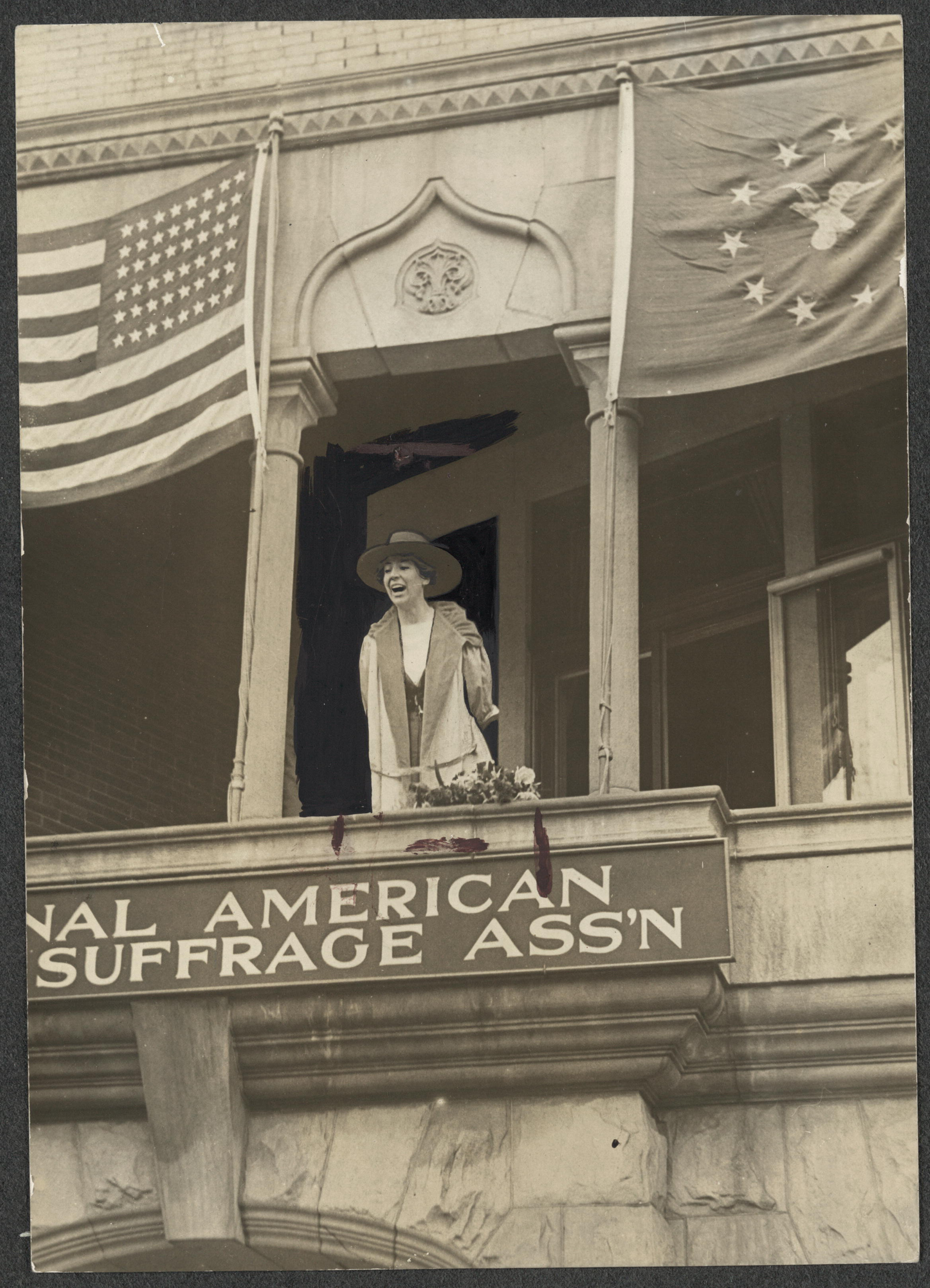
Jeannette Rankin speaking from the balcony of the National American Woman Suffrage Association on April 2, 1917—the same day that President Wilson declared, "The world has to be made safe for democracy."

Rankin used her office to push for better working conditions for laborers. On June 8, 1917, the Speculator Mine disaster in Butte left 168 miners dead. Workers called a massive protest strike over working conditions. Rankin tried to intervene, but mining companies refused to meet with her or the miners, and her proposed legislation to end the strike was unsuccessful. She had greater success pushing for better working conditions in the Bureau of Engraving and Printing. Rankin listened to the grievances of federal workers in the bureau, which included long hours and an excessively demanding work pace. She hired investigative reporter Elizabeth Watson to investigate. As a result of her efforts to draw attention to the working conditions of the bureau, Treasury Secretary William McAdoo convened his own investigation and ultimately limited the work day to eight hours.

By 1917, women had been granted some form of voting rights in about forty states. Rankin continued to lead the movement for unrestricted universal enfranchisement. She was instrumental in the creation of the Committee on Woman Suffrage and became one of its founding members. In January 1918, the committee delivered its report to Congress, and Rankin opened congressional debate on a Constitutional amendment granting universal suffrage to women.

Attempting to appeal to Southern representatives committed to Jim Crow discrimination, Rankin argued that white women could be given the vote without raising the issue of votes for African Americans: "Are you going to deny them [white women] the equipment with which to help you effectively simply because the enfranchisement of a child-race 50 years ago brought you a problem you were powerless to handle?"

The resolution passed in the House but was defeated in the Senate. The following year—after Rankin's congressional term had ended—the same resolution passed both chambers. (Note: No woman was serving in Congress when the resolution that would become the 19th Amendment passed. Rankin would later point out that she was, therefore, "the only woman who ever voted to give women the right to vote".) After ratification by three-fourths of the states, it became the Nineteenth Amendment to the United States Constitution.

During Rankin's term, Montana's state legislature voted to replace the state's two at-large Congressional seats with two single-member districts. With little chance of reelection in the overwhelmingly Democratic western district, Rankin chose instead to run for the Senate in 1918. After losing the Republican primary to physician Oscar M. Lanstrum, she accepted the nomination of the National Party and finished third in the general election behind Lanstrum and incumbent Democrat Thomas J. Walsh.

=== Between terms ===
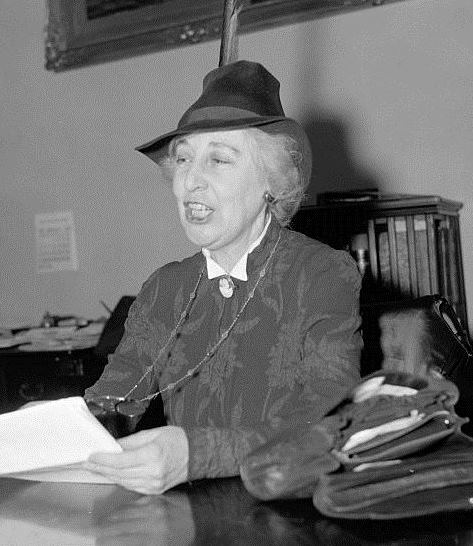
Rankin arguing against the fortification of Guam before the House Naval Affairs Committee in 1939

After leaving Congress, Rankin worked as a field secretary for the National Consumers League and as a lobbyist for various pacifist organizations. She argued for the passage of a Constitutional amendment banning child labor and supported the Sheppard–Towner Act, the first federal social welfare program created explicitly for women and children. The legislation was enacted in 1921 but repealed eight years later, though many of its key provisions were incorporated into the Social Security Act of 1935.

In 1920, Rankin helped found the American Civil Liberties Union and served as a vice president.

In 1924, Rankin bought a small farm near Athens, Georgia. She lived a simple life there, without electricity or plumbing, although she also maintained a residence in Montana. Rankin made frequent speeches around the country on behalf of the Women's Peace Union and the National Council for the Prevention of War (NCPW). In 1928 she founded the Georgia Peace Society, which served as headquarters for her pacifism campaign until its dissolution in 1941, on the eve of the U.S. involvement in World War II.

In 1937, Rankin opposed President Franklin Roosevelt's proposals to intervene on the British side against Germany and its allies, arguing that both sides wished to avoid a second European war and would pursue a diplomatic solution. She testified before multiple Congressional committees in opposition to various preparedness measures. When it became clear that her lobbying efforts were largely ineffective, Rankin resigned from her NCPW position and declared her intention to regain her seat in the House of Representatives.

=== Second congressional term ===
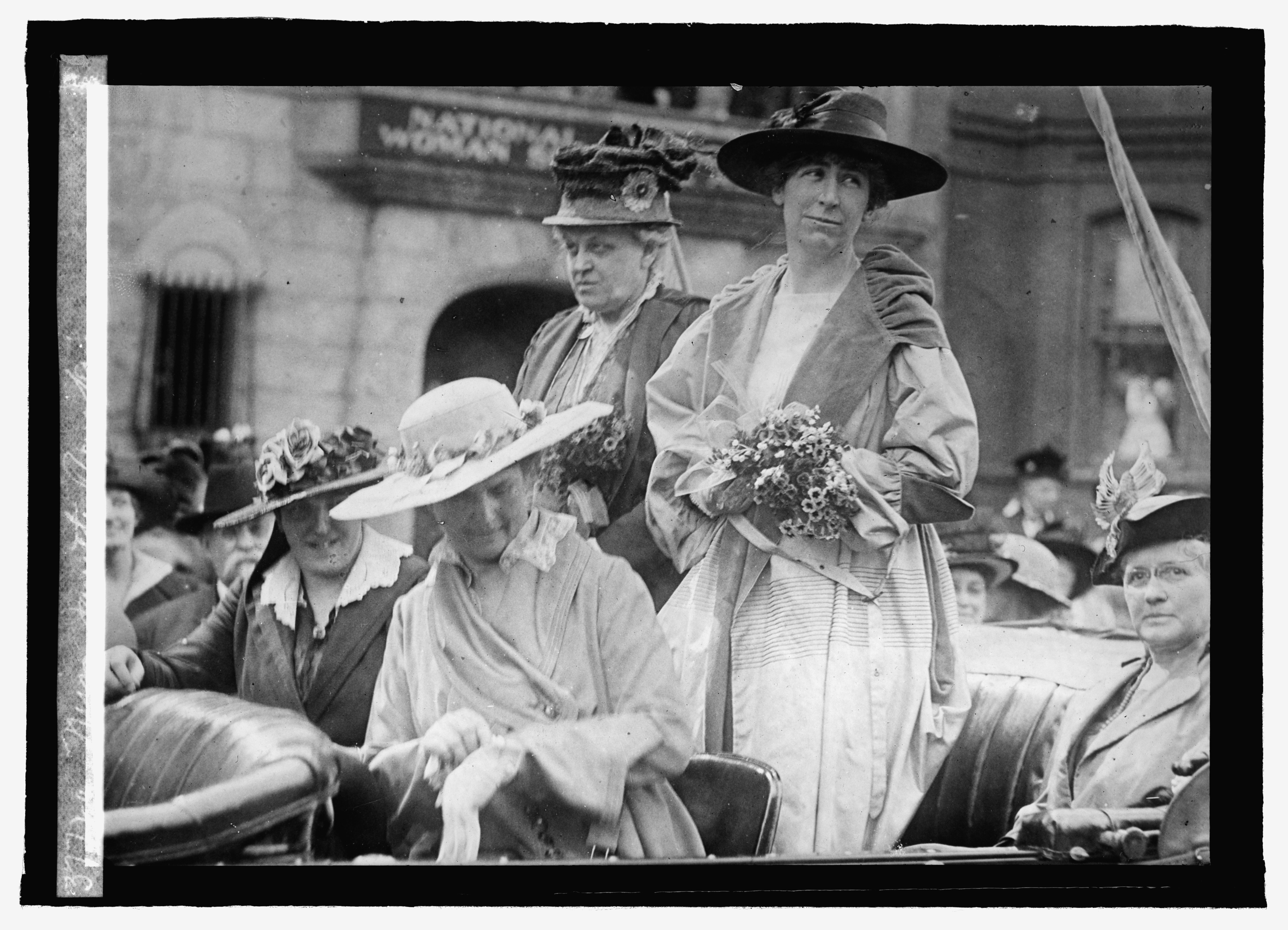
Jeannette Rankin

Rankin began her campaign for Congress in 1939 with a tour of high schools in Montana. She arranged to speak in 52 of the first congressional district's 56 high schools to reestablish her ties to the region after years of spending much of her time in Georgia. Once again, Rankin enjoyed the political support of her well connected brother Wellington, even though the siblings had increasingly divergent lifestyles and political views.

In the 1940 race, Rankin—at age 60—defeated incumbent Jacob Thorkelson in the July primary, and former Representative Jerry J. O'Connell in the general election. She was appointed to the Committee on Public Lands and the Committee on Insular Affairs. While members of Congress and their constituents had been debating the question of U.S. intervention in World War II for months, the Japanese attack on Pearl Harbor on December 7, 1941, galvanized the country and silenced virtually all opposition.

On December 8, Rankin was the only member of either chamber of Congress to vote against the declaration of war on Japan. Hisses could be heard in the gallery as she cast her vote; several colleagues, including Rep. (later Senator) Everett Dirksen, asked her to change it to make the resolution unanimous—or at very least, to abstain—but she refused. "As a woman I can't go to war," she said, "and I refuse to send anyone else."

After the vote, a crowd of reporters pursued Rankin into a cloakroom. There, she was forced to take refuge in a phone booth until Capitol Police arrived to escort her to her office, where she was inundated with angry telegrams and phone calls. One cable from her brother read, "Montana is 100 percent against you." A wire-service photo of Rankin sequestered in the phone booth, calling for assistance, appeared the following day in newspapers across the country.

While her action was widely ridiculed in the press, Progressive leader William Allen White, writing in the Kansas Emporia Gazette, acknowledged her courage in taking it:

Probably a hundred men in Congress would have liked to do what she did. Not one of them had the courage to do it. The Gazette entirely disagrees with the wisdom of her position. But Lord, it was a brave thing! And its bravery someway discounted its folly. When, in a hundred years from now, courage, sheer courage based upon moral indignation is celebrated in this country, the name of Jeannette Rankin, who stood firm in folly for her faith, will be written in monumental bronze– not for what she did but for the way she did it.

Three days later, a similar war declaration against Germany and Italy came to a vote; Rankin abstained. Realizing she had all but ended her political career with her vote against the war resolution, she did not run for reelection in 1942. Asked years later if she ever regretted her action, Rankin replied, "Never. If you're against war, you're against war regardless of what happens. It's a wrong method of trying to settle a dispute." John F. Kennedy would write about Rankin's decisions, "Few members of Congress have ever stood more alone while being true to a higher honor and loyalty."

== Later life ==
After leaving Congress, Rankin would withdraw from public life until the anti-Vietnam War protests of the 1960s. Over the next twenty years, Rankin travelled the world, frequently visiting India, where she studied the pacifist teachings of Mahatma Gandhi. She maintained homes in both Georgia and Montana.

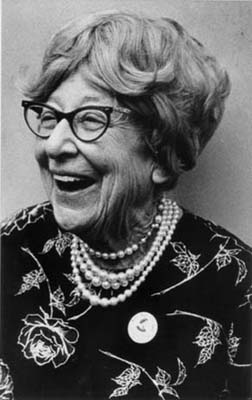
Rankin in 1973

In the 1960s and 1970s, a new generation of pacifists, feminists, and civil rights advocates found inspiration in Rankin and embraced her efforts in ways that her generation had not. She mobilized again in response to the Vietnam War. In January 1968, the Jeannette Rankin Brigade, a coalition of women's peace groups, organized an anti-war march in Washington, D.C.—the largest march by women since the Woman Suffrage Parade of 1913. Rankin led 5,000 participants from Union Station to the steps of the Capitol Building, where they presented a peace petition to House Speaker John McCormack. Simultaneously, a splinter group of activists from the women's liberation movement created a protest within the Brigade's protest by staging a "Burial of True Womanhood" at Arlington National Cemetery to draw attention to the passive role allotted to women as wives and mothers. In 1972, Rankin—by then in her nineties—considered mounting a third House campaign to gain a wider audience for her opposition to the Vietnam War, but longstanding throat and heart ailments forced her to abandon that final project.

== Personal life ==
Rankin never married, nor had any children.

== Death and legacy ==
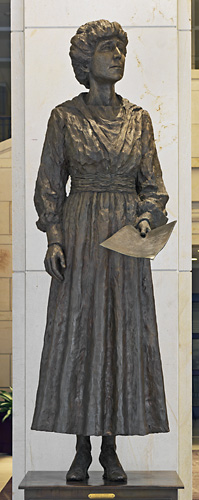
Rankin's monument in the National Statuary Hall, Washington, D.C., by Terry Mimnaugh (1985)

Rankin died on May 18, 1973, at age 92, in Carmel, California. There is a memorial stone dedicated to her in the Missoula Cemetery. She bequeathed her estate, including the property in Watkinsville, Georgia, to help "mature, unemployed women workers". Her Montana residence, known as the Rankin Ranch, was added to the National Register of Historic Places in 1976. The Jeannette Rankin Foundation (now the Jeannette Rankin Women's Scholarship Fund), a 501(c)(3) nonprofit organization, awards annual educational scholarships to low-income women 35 and older across the United States. Beginning with a single $500 scholarship in 1978, the fund has since awarded more than $1.8 million in scholarships to more than 700 women.

A statue of Rankin by Terry Mimnaugh, inscribed "I Cannot Vote For War", was placed in the United States Capitol's Statuary Hall in 1985. At its dedication, historian Joan Hoff-Wilson called Rankin "one of the most controversial and unique women in Montana and American political history." A replica stands in Montana's capitol building in Helena. In 1993, Rankin was inducted into the National Women's Hall of Fame.

A biography of Rankin titled Jeannette Rankin, America's Conscience was published posthumously in 2002 by historian Norma Longeteig Smith.

In 2004, peace activist Jeanmarie Simpson produced and starred in the one-woman play A Single Woman, based on the life of Rankin, to benefit peace organizations. Simpson also starred in a film adaptation that was directed and produced by Kamala Lopez, narrated by Martin Sheen, and featuring music by Joni Mitchell.

Opera America commissioned a song cycle about Rankin called Fierce Grace that premiered in 2017. In 2018, the Kalispell Brewing Company commissioned a mural on the side of its building in Kalispell, Montana, featuring a Rankin caricature and quotation.

Rankin is the subject of the musical We Won't Sleep (formerly Jeannette) with music and lyrics by Arianna Afsar and a book by Lauren Gunderson. Under the title Jeannette, the musical was part of the 2019 summer series at the National Music Theater Conference at the Eugene O'Neill Theater Center in Connecticut.

Although her legacy rests almost entirely on her pacifism, Rankin told the Montana Constitutional Convention in 1972 that she would have preferred otherwise. "If I am remembered for no other act," she said, "I want to be remembered as the only woman who ever voted to give women the right to vote."

== See also ==
- History of the Republican Party (United States)
- List of peace activists
- Women's International League for Peace and Freedom
- Women in the United States House of Representatives
- Barbara Lee, the only member of Congress to vote against American military response to the September 11, 2001, terrorist attacks
- A Single Woman (2004 play)
- A Single Woman (2008 film)

== Sources ==
- Alter, Judy (1999). Extraordinary Women of the American West. New York: Children's Press. ISBN 9780516209746.
- O'Brien, Mary Barmeyer (1995). Jeannette Rankin, 1880–1973 : bright star in the big sky. Helena, Mont.: Falcon Press. ISBN 1560442654.
- Shirley, Gayle C. (1995). More than Petticoats: Remarkable Montana Women (1st ed.). Helena, Mont.: Falcon Press. ISBN 1560443634.
- Smith, Norma (2002). Jeannette Rankin, America's Conscience. Helena, Mont.: Montana Historical Society Press. ISBN 9780917298790.

U.S. House of Representatives
Preceded by Tom Stout	Member of the U.S. House of Representatives from Montana's at-large congressional district Seat B 1917–1919	Succeeded by John Evans; 1st district
Preceded by Tom Stout	Member of the U.S. House of Representatives from Montana's at-large congressional district Seat B 1917–1919	Succeeded by Carl Riddick; 2nd district
Preceded by Jacob Thorkelson	Member of the U.S. House of Representatives from Montana's 1st congressional district 1941–1943	Succeeded by Mike Mansfield
