= 1930 United States Senate election in Montana =

- November 4, 1930
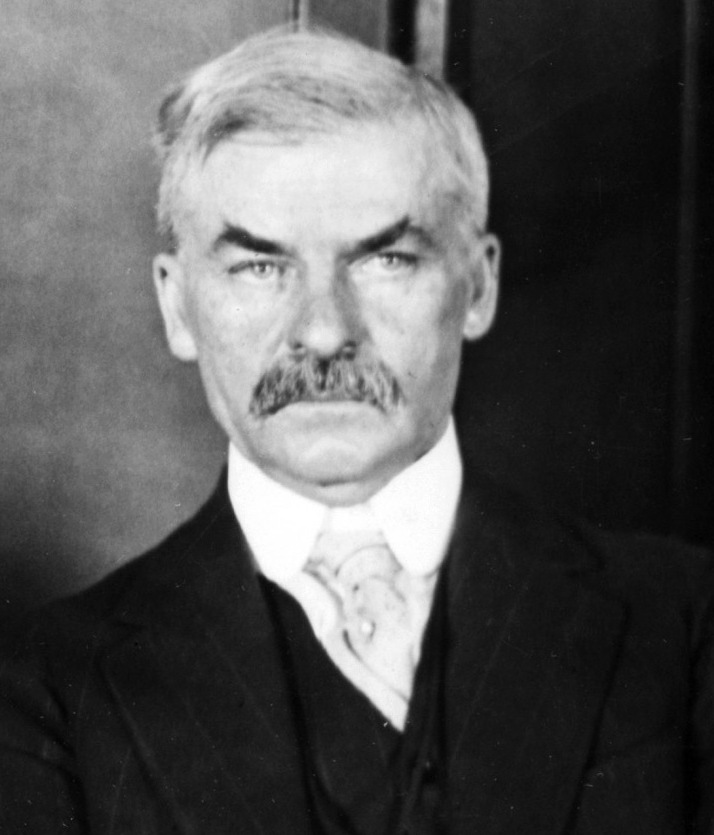

Nominee	Thomas J. Walsh	Albert J. Galen
Party	Democratic	Republican
Popular vote	106,274	66,724
Percentage	60.33%	37.88%
- County results Walsh: 30–40% 40–50% 50–60% 60–70% 70–80% Galen: 50–60%
U.S. senator before election
Thomas J. Walsh
Democratic
Elected U.S. Senator
Thomas J. Walsh
Democratic

The 1930 United States Senate election in Montana took place on November 4, 1930. Incumbent United States Senator Thomas J. Walsh, who was first elected to the Senate in 1912, and re-elected in 1918 and 1924, ran for re-election. He won the Democratic primary unopposed, and faced Montana Supreme Court Associate Justice Albert J. Galen, the Republican nominee, and several independent opponents in the general election. Ultimately, Walsh defeated his opponents in a landslide and won his fourth and final term in the Senate.

== Democratic primary ==
=== Candidates ===
- Thomas J. Walsh, incumbent United States Senator

=== Results ===
Democratic Party primary results
Party	Candidate	Votes	%
Democratic	Thomas J. Walsh (incumbent)	32,977	100.00%
Total votes		32,977	100.00%

== Republican primary ==
=== Candidates ===
- Albert J. Galen, Associate Justice of the Montana Supreme Court, former Attorney General of Montana
- O. H. P. Shelley

=== Results ===
Republican Primary results
Party	Candidate	Votes	%
Republican	Albert J. Galen	44,103	66.95%
Republican	O. H. P. Shelley	21,774	33.05%
Total votes		65,877	100.00%

== General election ==
=== Results ===
United States Senate election in Montana, 1930
Party	Candidate	Votes	%	±%
Democratic	Thomas J. Walsh (incumbent)	106,274	60.33%	+7.52%
Republican	Albert J. Galen	66,724	37.88%	−4.52%
Farmer–Labor	Charles E. Taylor	1,789	1.02%	−3.32%
Socialist	John F. McKay	1,006	0.57%	+0.26%
Communist	Willis L. Wright	368	0.21%	
Majority		39,550	22.45%	+12.04%
Turnout		176,161		
Democratic hold		Swing		

== See also ==
- United States Senate elections, 1930 and 1931
