= Frank Bird Linderman House =

Historic house in Montana, United States

- U.S. National Register of Historic Places
- Location: Address restricted, Lake County, Montana
- Area: 6.2 acres (2.5 ha)
- Built: 1917
- NRHP reference No.: 84002479
- Added to NRHP: February 22, 1984

The Frank Bird Linderman House is a site on the National Register of Historic Places located in Lake County, Montana. It was added to the Register on February 22, 1984.

Presumably it includes a house of Frank Bird Linderman.

Linderman is known to have owned property at Goose Bay on Flathead Lake (which is in Lake County and Flathead County), to which he moved his family from Helena, where he wrote full-time.
