= Jeanmarie Simpson =

American activist and actor

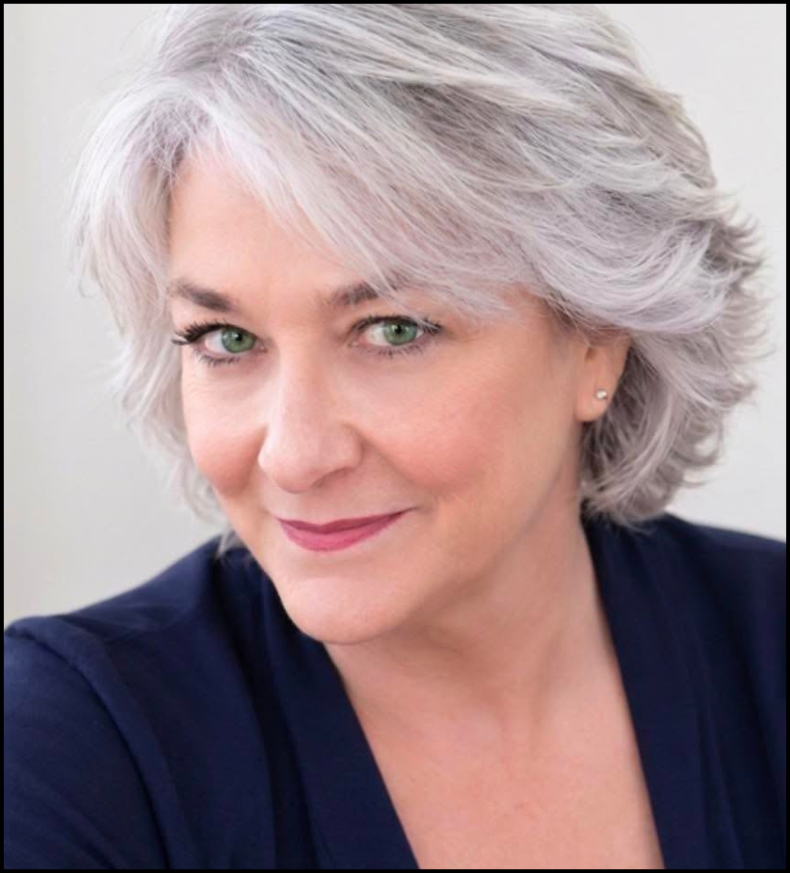
- Jeanmarie Simpson Headshot
- Born: Jeannemarie Simpson; November 20, 1959 (age 66); Ray, Arizona, United States
- Occupations: Actress, director, choreographer, playwright, peace activist
- Years active: 1972–present
- Spouse: Daniel Joseph Bishop (m. 1976)
- Children: 3

Jeanmarie Simpson (born November 20, 1959) is an American theatre artist and peace activist best known for writing and playing the title role in the 2004 play A Single Woman, and its 2008 film adaptation, based on the life of first US Congresswoman, Jeannette Rankin.

== Early life ==
Simpson was born in Ray, Arizona. Her parents were Maria Luisa Jugo, a Venezuelan immigrant, and Donald Leroy Simpson, an American mining engineer. She is the great-granddaughter of Carlos López Bustamante. She was raised in rural Arizona. Her family's move to Toronto, Ontario, Canada in 1970 led to her theatre training.

== Career ==
She was founding artistic director of the Nevada Shakespeare Company for which she directed many acclaimed productions and played iconic characters including Maude Gonne and Lady Macbeth. She retired from the company in 2008.

Simpson appeared in the American premier of the one-woman play, Shakespeare's Will, by Canadian playwright, Vern Thiessen. The production was presented by Theatre 40 in Beverly Hills, California, and was produced by Leonard Nimoy and directed by Susan Bay.

In one of his few American directing projects, Tony Award winner, Zakes Mokae cast Simpson as Elsa in Athol Fugard's The Road to Mecca in 2003.The production was a collaboration between the Nevada Shakespeare Company and the Nevada Conservatory Theatre, based at the University of Nevada in Las Vegas.

She starred in the film version of her play, A Single Woman, based on the life of Jeannette Rankin. The film was produced by Heroica Films and directed by Kamala Lopez, a cousin of Simpson's. Though the project includes the voices of many celebrities, including Martin Sheen, Peter Coyote, Judd Nelson and Patricia Arquette and includes in its soundtrack the iconic Joni Mitchell songs "Woodstock" and "The Circle Game", the film has not been picked up by a distributor, nor has it had a theatrical release. Simpson was unhappy with the film, and in October 2011 she is quoted in the Huffington Post saying of it, "That's probably the biggest disappointment of my life."

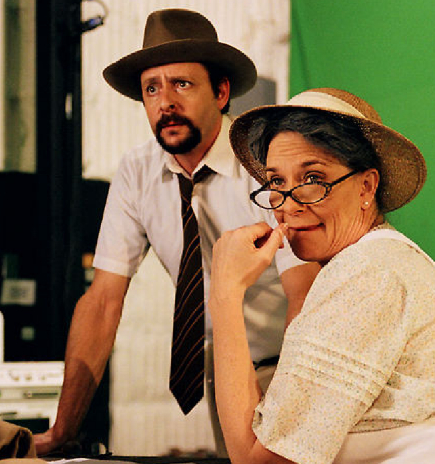
Jeanmarie Simpson with actor Judd Nelson on the set of A Single Woman, the film.

In September 2009, Simpson opened in Tucson, Arizona in the one-woman show, Coming In Hot, based on the book Powder: writing by women in the ranks from Vietnam to Iraq. The show subsequently toured extensively, and garnered praise and also a fair amount of criticism by peace activists who thought it glorified war.

On July 4, 2012, Simpson presented at the University of Rhode Island a reading of her play, Heretic - The Mary Dyer Story, about the life of Mary Dyer, a Quaker hanged in Boston in 1660. In January 2015, it was announced that Simpson would tour the UK and Europe with Heretic, presented by The Leaveners. The play was subsequently filmed with an ASL interpreter on camera and Simpson's voice. Titled Heretic - the Mary Dyer story the film may be viewed at no cost on YouTube with subtitles in more than 300 languages.

== Activism ==
Jeanmarie Simpson is a Lifetime Member of the Women's International League for Peace and Freedom (WILPF), serving as treasurer of the US Section as of March, 2016. She has been a pacifist and human rights/peace activist since 1984, when she observed the disparity between the wealthy and socio-economically challenged members of society while working as a Special Projects Coordinator for Consolidated Agencies of Human Service in Hawthorne, Nevada.

After September 11, 2001, Simpson, a "self-described artivist," retreated from traditional theatre and began creating biographical works, political in nature, based on the lives of historical women.

Several political commentaries by Simpson can be found on Common Dreams.

== Personal life ==
Simpson has three children and four grandchildren. She remarried her first husband, Daniel Bishop, on August 28, 2015. The two were first married on July 24, 1976.

== Current activities ==
Simpson is one of the founders and the Artistic Director of Arizona Theatre Matters, based in Phoenix, Arizona.

Since 2024, audio/sign language productions of her plays The Jewish Question, Bambino Mio - Bright Little Flame (about the life of Maria Montessori), When Churchyards Yawn - (Hamlet in Purgatory), and Pineapple and Other Options were launched on YouTube.

As of January 2024, Simpson was clerk of the Fellowship of Quakers in the Arts.

In 2025, a collection of four plays by Simpson titled When Churchyards Yawn and Other Plays was published by Upstage Left Press, a feminist publishing house dedicated to original dramatic literature by female-identifying writers. The anthology includes When Churchyards Yawn, Lear (A Solo Adaptation), Ghosts of the Gilded Stage, and Even Unto Death. Written during and after the COVID-19 pandemic, the plays explore themes of legacy, isolation, grief, and memory through revisionist and feminist perspectives.

The title play, When Churchyards Yawn, imagines the characters of Shakespeare's Hamlet confined in Purgatory forty years after their deaths. Critics have noted its mix of irreverence and moral inquiry, and Simpson's reimagining of characters such as Gertrude and Claudius has been praised for its depth and nuance.

Lear (A Solo Adaptation) reinterprets Shakespeare's tragedy as a one-person show set during the king's final moments, described by Simpson as a “non-linear fever dream” blending Shakespearean and original text. Ghosts of the Gilded Stage, a pandemic-informed monodrama, centers on an aging actor alone onstage with the detritus of his career, confronting memory and artistic mortality.

Even Unto Death focuses on Joan of Arc's posthumous legacy, particularly through the eyes of her mother Isabelle Romée. The play interrogates the politics of sainthood and how trauma is inherited and remembered, reframing Joan not as an icon of fearlessness but as a terrified girl caught in an impossible choice.

The collection has been recognized for its structural experimentation and its resonance with contemporary theatre movements, including feminist adaptations, post-pandemic storytelling, and the resurgence of solo performance. Upstage Left Press described Simpson's work as “potent, enduring… [that] commands the page, with or without production history.” In 2026, the publisher released a revised and expanded second edition.

== See also ==
- List of peace activists
- A Single Woman, play
