= Frank Bird Linderman =

American politician (1869–1938)

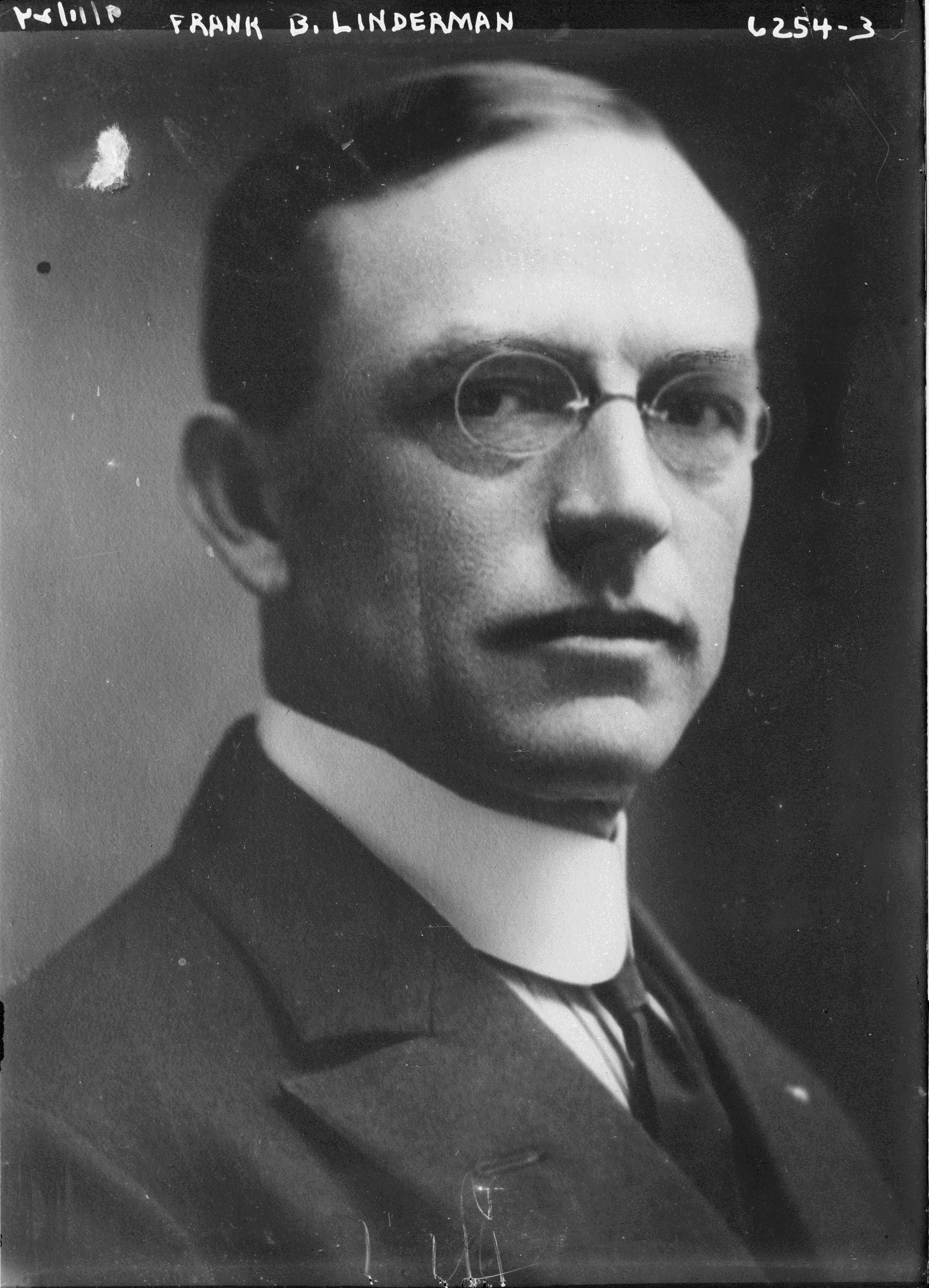
- Linderman c. 1905
- Born: September 25, 1869; Cleveland, Ohio, U.S.
- Died: May 12, 1938 (aged 68)
- Occupations: Writer, politician
- Spouse: Minnie Johns Linderman
- Writing career
- Notable work: Indian Why Stories: Sparks from War Eagle's Lodge-fire

Frank Bird Linderman (September 25, 1869 – May 12, 1938) was a Montana writer, politician, Native American ally and ethnographer. Born in Cleveland, Ohio, he went West as a young man and became enamored of life on the Montana frontier. While working as a trapper for several years, he lived with the Salish and Blackfeet tribes, learning their cultures. He later became an advocate for them and for other northern Plains Indians. He wrote about their cultures and worked to help them survive pressure from European Americans. For instance, he supported establishment of the Rocky Boy Indian Reservation in 1916 in Montana for landless Ojibwe (Chippewa) and Cree, and continued as an advocate for Native Americans to his death.

Linderman worked at various jobs throughout his life: as a fur trapper, then an assayer, and later an agent for Guardian Insurance of America. He owned a hotel for two years. For another two years, he published a newspaper, the Sheridan Chinook. He served two terms in the Montana Legislature and campaigned for a seat in Congress. He published his first collection of Native American tribal stories in 1915 and wrote twenty more books over the next two decades. He wrote to share what he knew about Native American cultures and to preserve their traditional stories. His friend Charles Marion Russell, noted painter, illustrated many of these books.

== Life ==
=== Early life ===
Linderman was born in Cleveland, Ohio. He was the child of James Bird Linderman and Mary Ann Brannan Linderman. He attended schools in Ohio and Illinois, including Oberlin College. In 1885, at the age of sixteen, he moved to the Swan Valley of Montana Territory in search of "the most unspoiled wilderness I could discover."

=== Montana ===
While working as a trapper from 1885 to 1891, Linderman met many members of the Bitterroot Salish (also known as Flathead) and Kutenai tribes. He set up camp on their territory on the shores of Flathead Lake, where he learned their ways and lived as they did. To know them better and communicated for trading, he mastered Plains Indian sign language, and he became known by the Crow as "Sign-talker", or, sometimes Great Sign-talker. The Blackfeet called him Iron Tooth, the Kootenai knew him as Bird-Singer, and the Cree and Chippewa called him Glasses or Sings-like-a-bird.

In 1891 he met his future wife, Minnie Jane Johns, in Demersville (now Kalispell). He knew he needed steady work in order to marry, and in 1892 he left his trapping career and started working as a watchman at the Curlew Mine in Ravalli County. Stearne Blake, part owner of the mine, asked him to take over bookkeeping and to assay silver and lead ore. Linderman promptly ordered books and taught himself to do these jobs. He and Minnie married in Missoula in 1893.

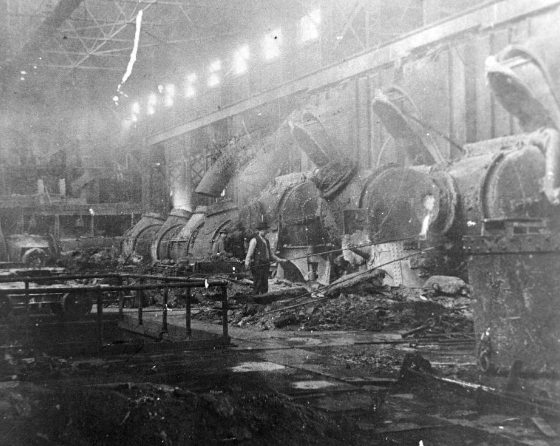
Men work at the Butte and Boston Smelter, 1910. Linderman worked here as assayer between 1893 and 1897.

After the Curlew Mine closed, Linderman moved with his family in 1893 to Butte where he worked as chief assayer and chemist for the Butte & Boston Smelter. Two daughters were born to the Lindermans while they lived in Butte. He complained about the brutality of the city, saying that it was overrun with rough immigrants from Europe. He worked there until 1897, moving in 1898 to Brandon, Montana, where their third daughter was born. His parents joined him in Montana the following year.

Around 1900, the Linderman family moved to Sheridan, Montana, where Frank worked several jobs, as an assayer, furniture salesman, and newspaperman. He bought the local newspaper and renamed it the Sheridan Chinook. He bought most of the paper's content from a publishing house in Spokane, but each week he published a few columns of his own writing—poetry, "Uncle Billy" sayings, and stories about local miners.

=== Politics ===
Linderman became active in politics and was elected in 1902 to the Montana Legislature as the representative from Madison County, Montana; his term was one year, and he was elected again in 1904, serving in 1905. That same year, the Linderman family moved to the capital city of Helena. After his term in the legislature, Linderman served as assistant secretary of state from 1905 to 1907. He also opened an assay office in Helena.

Linderman changed jobs again in 1907 and began traveling the state as a life insurance agent for Germania Life Insurance Company. But his political ambitions continued. In 1916, he ran for one of Montana's two at-large seats for Congress, but did not place among the top two finishers. Jeannette Rankin, who was born in the state and worked for women's suffrage, gained the second-highest number of votes and won a seat. She helped gain a national constitutional amendment to achieve universal suffrage for women. In a letter to his father, Linderman blamed his loss on the "fad" of woman suffrage.

In 1924, Linderman ran for popular election to the United States Senate against well-known incumbent Democratic United States Senator Thomas J. Walsh. The Democrat had first been elected by the state legislature in 1912, which was then the practice, and re-elected in 1918 by popular vote. Linderman won the Republican primary against Wellington D. Rankin, the Attorney General of Montana, and advanced to the general election. Walsh defeated Linderman by a wide margin to keep his Senate seat.

=== Native American advocate ===
Linderman continued to be fascinated by Native Americans. He advocated on behalf of the landless Chippewa and Cree in Montana, who struggled to survive. He supported Native Americans as the real Americans, while believing there was a place for Anglo-Americans in the West. Believing that native peoples should be protected, he became an advocate with the government for Chief Rocky Boy, who had a Chippewa band and was seeking to gain a reservation. He recognized that they had been originally assigned to land that was infertile and unsuitable for farming. Linderman used his network of prominent whites, including other politicians and painter Charles M. Russell, to lobby Congress to set up a reservation for the Chippewa band. Thanks largely to Linderman's advocacy, Congress established the Rocky Boy's Indian Reservation in Montana in 1916.

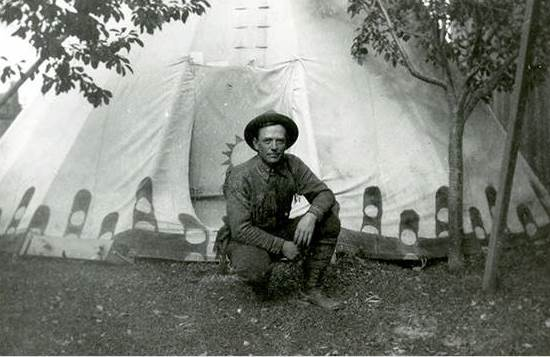
Frank Bird Linderman poses in front of his Thunder Lodge. The lodge was painted for him by Mrs. Running Rabbit and Mrs. Buffalo Body.

For years afterward, Linderman "continued to press politicians and Indian service bureaucrats for better rations, permission for the Indians to practice traditional dances, such as the forbidden sun dance, and for an expansion of the reservation. In a 1933 letter to the reform-minded John Collier, head of the Bureau of Indian Affairs, he wrote, 'these indians are real workers, and if encouraged and helped will prove to the doubters that the red man has a future even in the white man’s scheme of things.' They needed more land to be successful, he believed, to prove themselves." Linderman corresponded with Collier for the rest of his life. He encouraged Collier's reforms, including stopping the use of tribal funds for administrative purposes, denouncing boarding schools, allowing Indians to practice their ceremonies, and passing the Indian Reorganization Act (IRA). He supported the IRA by traveling to Rocky Boy's Indian Reservation in 1934 to explain the new policies to the reservation's business council.

=== Writing career ===
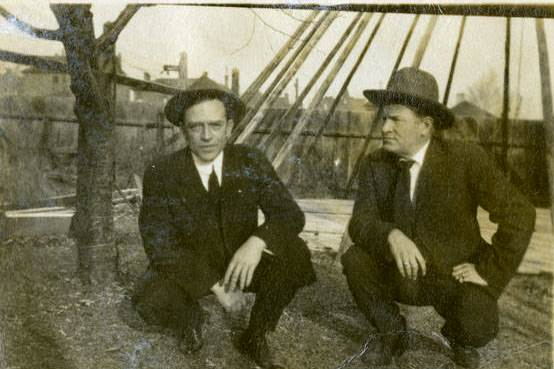
Linderman poses with his friend Charles Marion Russell at the Linderman house in Helena, 1913.

Throughout his life, Linderman collected Native American stories. His first book, Indian Why Stories: Sparks from War Eagle's Lodge-fire, was published in 1915 by Charles Scribner's Sons. After moving with his family to a log home on Montana's Flathead Lake in 1917, Linderman focused his attention on writing. He had spent his life gathering stories, and he felt a duty to write them down. He wrote as much in a letter to a friend, "I feel it a duty to, in some way, preserve the old West, especially Montana, in printer's ink, and if I can only accomplish a small part of that, I shall die contented." He wrote six books of Native American legends, an autobiography, a collection of frontier stories, six novels, three animal stories, and a collection of reminiscences about his friend and artist Charles Marion Russell. His most important works, however, were biographies of Pretty Shield and Plenty Coups. He interviewed them in sign language over the course of several weeks. He shaped his notes into books that he presented as autobiographies. Anthropologists and ethnologists noted that Linderman shaped the narratives in significant ways. However, anthropologist Robert Lowie acknowledged that Linderman's work contains useful information about Crow life.

== Works ==
- Indian Why Stories: Sparks from War Eagle's Lodge-Fire at Project Gutenberg
- Indian Old-man Stories at the Internet Archive (1920)
- On a Passing Frontier (1920)
- How It Came About Stories at the Internet Archive (1921)
- Bunch-grass and Blue-joint at the Internet Archive (1921), collected poems
- Lige Mounts, Free Trapper at the Internet Archive (1922)
- Kootenai Why Stories at the Internet Archive (1926)
- American: The Life Story of a Great Indian - Plenty-coups, Chief of the Crows at the Internet Archive (1930)
- Morning Light, (1930)
- Red Mother (1932), republished under the title Pretty-Shield: Medicine Woman of the Crows
- Old Man Coyote (Crow) (1932)
- Beyond Law (1933)
- Stumpy at the Internet Archive (1933)
- Out of the North: A Brief Historical Sketch of the Blackfeet Indian Tribe (1940)
- Recollections of Charley Russell at the Internet Archive (1963)
- Henry Plummer: A Novel (2000)

== Legacy ==
- The Frank Bird Linderman House in Lake County, Montana is listed on the National Register of Historic Places.
- His papers are preserved at the University of Montana in the "Frank B. Linderman Memorial Collection, 1885-2005".
- Other papers of Linderman are held by UCLA
- In 2007, he was inducted into the Hall of Great Westerners of the National Cowboy & Western Heritage Museum.

Party political offices
Preceded by Oscar M. Lanstrum	Republican nominee for U.S. Senator from Montana (Class 2); 1924	Succeeded by Albert J. Galen
