= Thomas J. Walsh =

American lawyer and politician

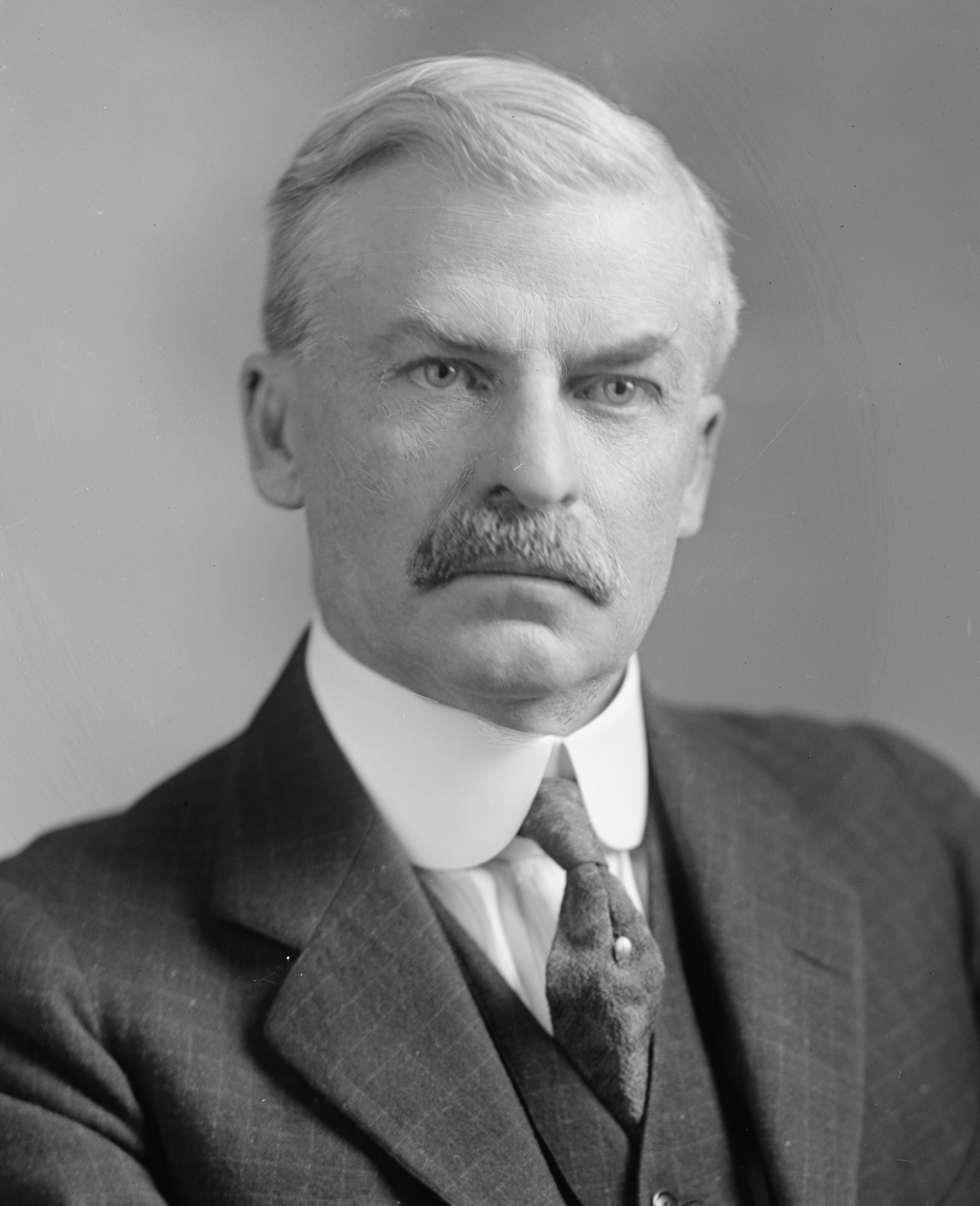
- Walsh, c. 1905

United States Senator from Montana
- In office March 4, 1913 – March 2, 1933
- Preceded by: Joseph M. Dixon
- Succeeded by: John E. Erickson

Personal details
- Born: June 12, 1859 Two Rivers, Wisconsin, U.S.
- Died: March 2, 1933 (aged 73) Wilson, North Carolina, U.S.
- Resting place: Resurrection Cemetery, Helena, Montana, U.S.
- Party: Democratic
- Spouses: Elinor McClements (m. 1889; died 1917) Mina Nieves Perez Chaumont de Truffin (m. 1933)
- Children: 1
- Education: University of Wisconsin Law School

Thomas James Walsh (June 12, 1859 – March 2, 1933) was an American lawyer and Democratic Party politician from Helena, Montana who represented Montana in the US Senate from 1913 to 1933. He was initially elected by the state legislature, and from 1918 on by popular vote, in keeping with the requirements of the Seventeenth Amendment to the United States Constitution.

Walsh had a national reputation as a liberal. He died before he could serve President-elect Franklin D. Roosevelt, who chose him as his Attorney General.

== Background ==
Walsh was born in Two Rivers, Wisconsin on June 12, 1859, the son of Irish Catholic immigrants, Bridget (Comer) and Felix Walsh; his father was an active Democrat and was elected as a member of the local school board.

Walsh taught school while attending the University of Wisconsin Law School. He graduated in 1884 and was admitted to the bar. He moved to Redfield, Dakota Territory to practice law. In August 1889, he married Elinor McClements (1859–1917). They had a daughter, Genevieve, born in 1890.

Moving to the state capital of Helena, Montana in 1890, Walsh established a law practice that specialized in personal injury cases and cases involving water rights and copper mining.

== Career ==
Walsh became a leader in Democratic Party politics in Helena and attended numerous local, county and state conventions as a delegate. He was defeated in a 1906 election for the United States House of Representatives and a 1910 race for the U.S. Senate. Walsh was a delegate to the Democratic National Conventions of 1908, 1912, 1916, 1920, 1924, 1928, and 1932. He was the permanent chairman of the 1928 and 1932 conventions.

In 1912, Walsh won a state legislative election for U.S. Senate. He was repeatedly re-elected, and served from 1913 until his death in 1933. He emerged as a spokesman for President Woodrow Wilson in the Senate and supported the graduated income tax, farm loans, and women's suffrage.

Walsh managed Wilson's western campaign against Charles Evans Hughes during the 1916 presidential election, and was credited with helping Wilson win a narrow re-election victory. Unlike many Irish Catholics, who did not want the United States to ally with the United Kingdom, Walsh supported Wilson's foreign policy and voted for war against Germany in 1917. In 1919, he supported Wilson's peace plans and the League of Nations.

Walsh ran for re-election in 1918. In a three-way election that included him, former State Representative Oscar M. Lanstrum as the Republican nominee, and US Representative Jeannette Rankin as the National Party nominee, Walsh narrowly won a second term.

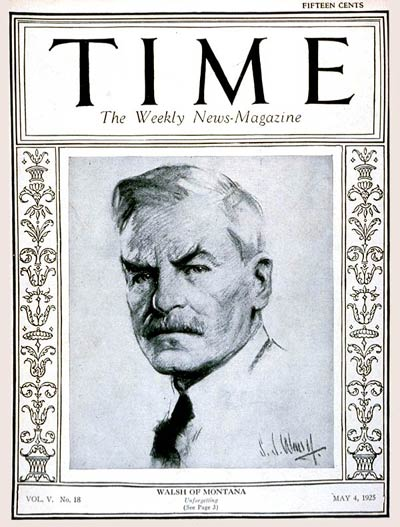
Time cover, 4 May 1925

In his re-election in 1924, he defeated Republican Frank Bird Linderman by a solid margin. In 1930, Walsh ran for re-election and defeated Albert J. Galen in a landslide.

During his tenure in the Senate, Walsh gained fame for his legal ability in the Judiciary Committee and speaking ability on the floor.

In the 1920s, Walsh headed the Senate investigation into the Teapot Dome scandal that involved top officials of the administration of President Warren G. Harding. He was chairman of the Democratic National Convention in New York in 1924 and in Chicago in 1932. Walsh opposed child labor and supported women's suffrage and, unlike most other Catholics, Prohibition. On December 18, 1927 Senator Walsh introduced a plan to investigate the country's electric industry. The investigation done by the Federal Trade Commission would continue through 1935 and eventually result in four of the most important laws governing the electric industry in the 20th century including the breakup of most of the large holding companies that formed during the 1920s.

In 1933, Walsh was nominated for Attorney General by incoming President Franklin Roosevelt. In late February, he secretly married wealthy Cuban widow Mina Nieves Perez Chaumont de Truffin in Havana, Cuba. Less than a week later on March 2, he died of coronary thrombosis in Wilson, North Carolina while en route by train to Washington for Roosevelt's inauguration. He was 73 years old. It was also rumored that he was poisoned by his new wife, but no evidence was proven.

His funeral service was held in the Chamber of the United States Senate, and he was interred at Resurrection Cemetery in Helena.

== See also ==
- List of members of the United States Congress who died in office (1900–1949)

Party political offices
First	Democratic nominee for U.S. Senator from Montana (Class 2); 1913, 1918, 1924, 1930	Succeeded by James E. Murray
U.S. Senate
Preceded by Joseph M. Dixon	U.S. senator from Montana; 1913–1933	Succeeded by John E. Erickson
