= A Single Woman (play) =

Play about Jeannette Rankin, the first US Congresswoman

- Written by: Jeanmarie Simpson
- Characters: Jeannette Rankin
- Original language: English

Premiere
- Date premiered: 2004
- Place premiered: Oats Park Art Center in Fallon, Nevada

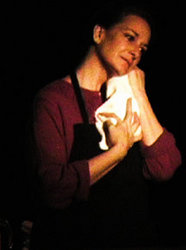
Jeanmarie Simpson as Rankin Off-Broadway in 2005

A Single Woman is a play based on the life of Jeannette Rankin, the first woman in the United States Congress. First drafted as a one-woman show by Nevada Shakespeare Company founding Artistic Director, Jeanmarie Simpson, it developed into a "duet performance work" by the time it premiered at the Oats Park Art Center in Fallon, Nevada on February 7, 2004.

The play subsequently toured internationally with thousands of grassroots performances in 54 countries, including a 4-week run at The Culture Project Off-Broadway in the summer of 2005. The play closed at the Invisible Theatre in Tucson, Arizona on November 5, 2006.

== Artists ==
In addition to being a theatre artist, Simpson, the author and performer of the title role, is a peace activist. Many performances of the play have been fundraisers for individual branches and the national office of the Women's International League for Peace and Freedom (WILPF), in addition to hundreds of other peace and justice organizations including United Methodist Church's Social Justice and Global Ministries, Jews for Peace, Planned Parenthood, American Civil Liberties Union, Veterans for Peace, American Friends Service Committee and many others.

Simpson directed the production in New York, initially with Claudia Schneider and Les Misérables veteran, Neal Mayer, in the roles. Midway through, Simpson stepped in and completed the run as Rankin.

== See also ==
- Jeannette Rankin
- Jane Addams
- Raging Grannies
- A Single Woman (film)
