= 1918 United States Senate election in Montana =

- November 5, 1918
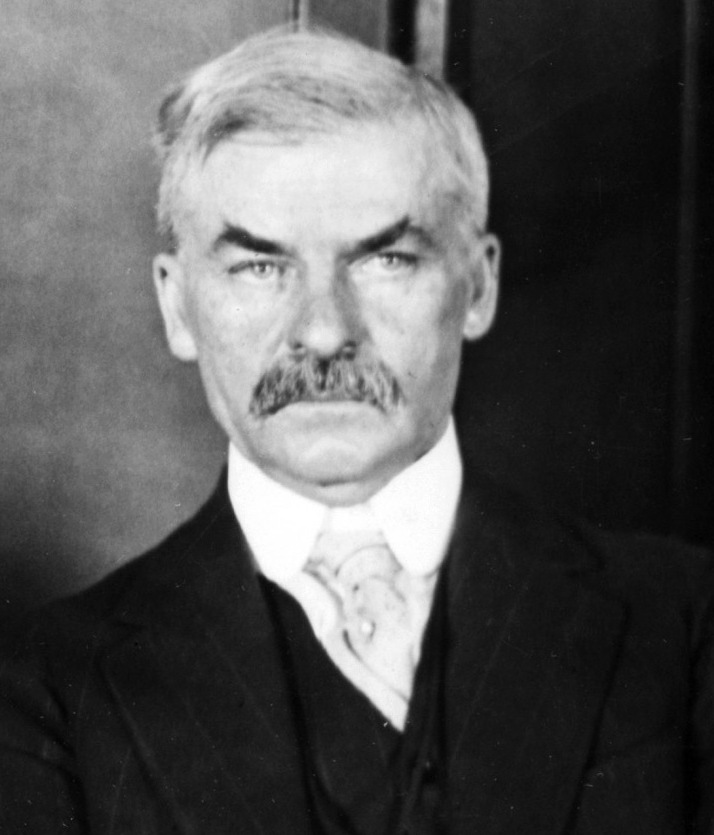

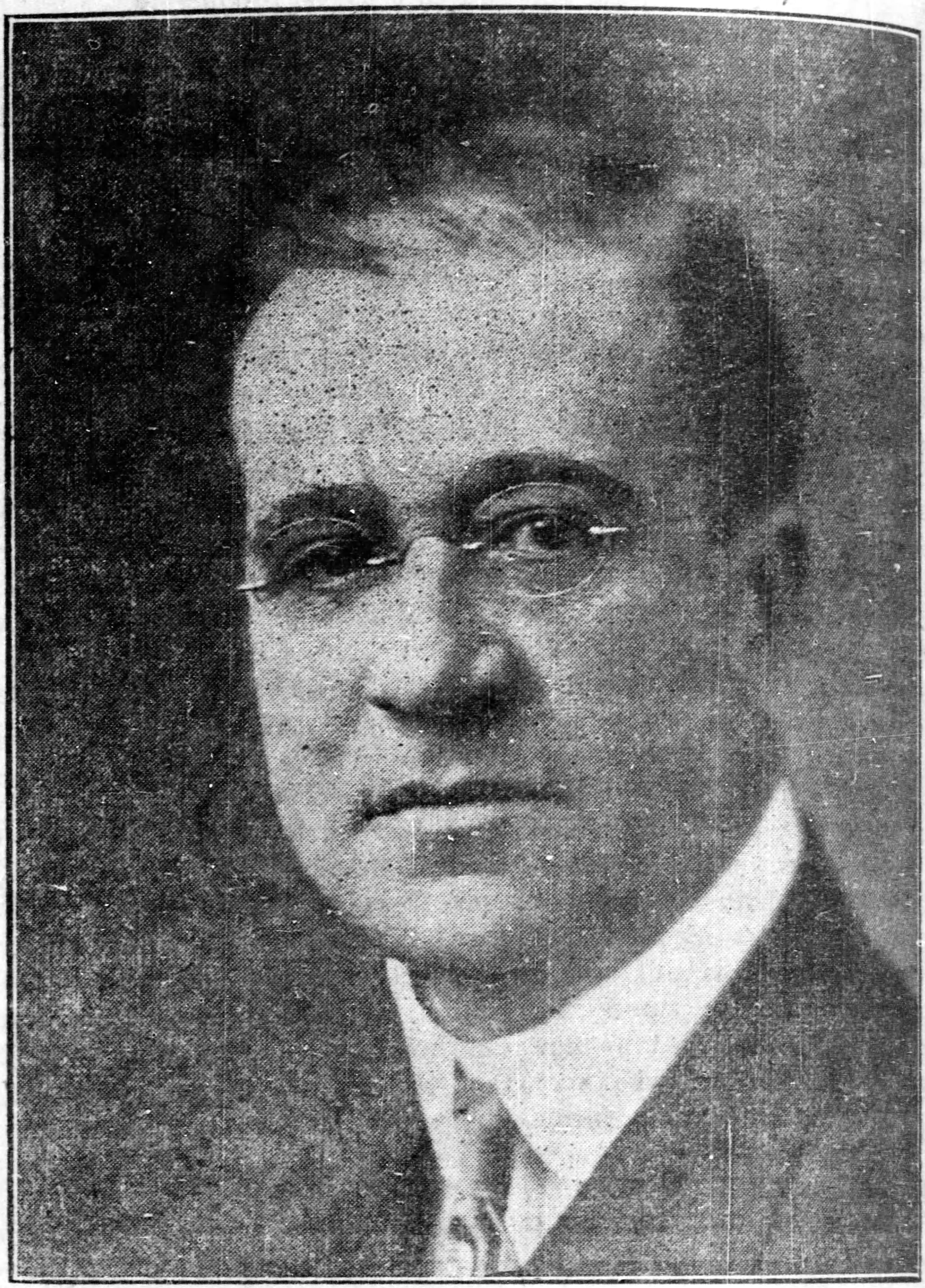

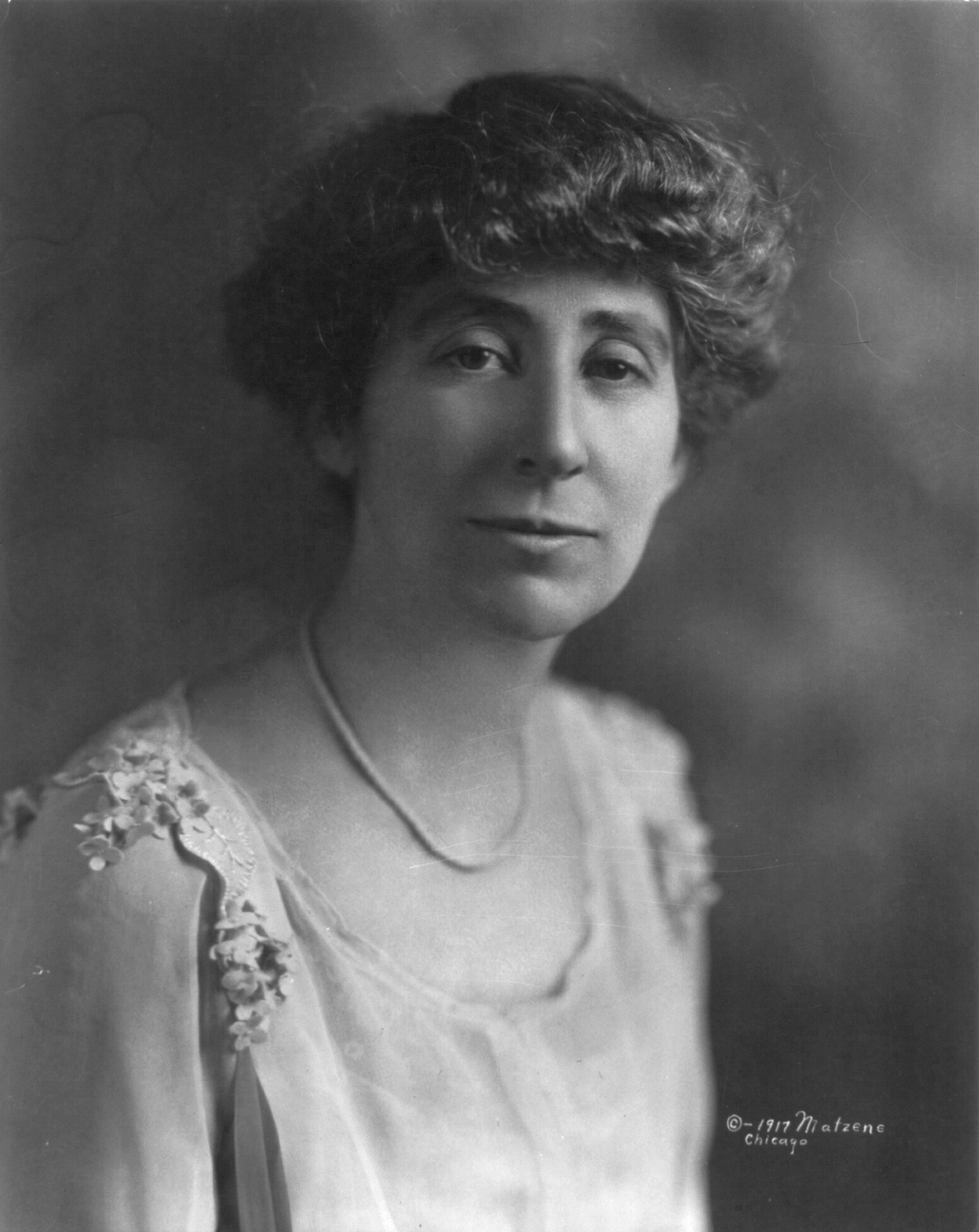
Nominee	Thomas J. Walsh	Oscar M. Lanstrum	Jeannette Rankin
Party	Democratic	Republican	National
Popular vote	46,160	40,229	26,013
Percentage	41.07%	35.79%	23.14%
- County results Walsh: 30–40% 40–50% 50–60% Lanstrum: 30–40% 40–50% 50–60% Rankin: 30–40% 40–50% No Data/Vote
U.S. senator before election
Thomas J. Walsh
Democratic
Elected U.S. Senator
Thomas J. Walsh
Democratic

The 1918 United States Senate election in Montana took place on November 5, 1918. Incumbent United States Senator Thomas J. Walsh, who was first elected to the Senate in 1912, ran for re-election. He won the Democratic primary uncontested, and was opposed in the general election by Oscar M. Lanstrum, a former State Representative and the Republican nominee, and Jeannette Rankin, one of two United States representatives from Montana's at-large congressional district and the nominee of the National Party. Walsh narrowly won his second term in the Senate.

== Democratic primary ==
=== Candidates ===
==== Nominee ====
- Thomas J. Walsh, incumbent United States Senator

=== Results ===
Democratic Party primary results
Party	Candidate	Votes	%
Democratic	Thomas J. Walsh (incumbent)	28,553	100.00%
Total votes		28,553	100.00%

== Republican primary ==
=== Candidates ===
==== Nominee ====
- Oscar M. Lanstrum, former State Representative

==== Eliminated in primary ====
- Jeannette Rankin, U.S. representative from Montana's at-large congressional district
- Edmund Nichols
- Harry H. Parsons, attorney

=== Results ===
Republican Primary results
Party	Candidate	Votes	%
Republican	Oscar M. Lanstrum	18,805	41.59%
Republican	Jeannette Rankin	17,091	37.80%
Republican	Harry H. Parsons	5,878	13.00%
Republican	Edmund Nichols	3,443	7.61%
Total votes		45,217	100.00%

== General election ==
=== Results ===
1918 United States Senate election in Montana
Party	Candidate	Votes	%	±%
Democratic	Thomas J. Walsh (incumbent)	46,160	41.07%	−0.10%
Republican	Oscar M. Lanstrum	40,229	35.79%	+9.06%
National	Jeannette Rankin	26,013	23.14%	
Majority		5,931	5.28%	−3.79%
Turnout		112,402		
Democratic hold		Swing		
