= A Single Woman (film) =

- Movie poster
- Directed by: Kamala Lopez
- Screenplay by: Jeanmarie Simpson
- Based on: A Single Woman by Jeanmarie Simpson
- Produced by: Cameron Crain; Richard Shelgren; Kamala Lopez
- Starring: Jeanmarie Simpson; Judd Nelson
- Cinematography: Gabriel Diniz
- Edited by: Kamala Lopez
- Music by: Johnny Wilson
- Release date: September 21, 2008
- Running time: 97 minutes
- Country: United States
- Language: English

A Single Woman is a 2008 film made by Nevada Shakespeare Company and Heroica Films. It was directed by Kamala Lopez and produced by Cameron Crain, Richard Shelgren and Kamala Lopez. The screenplay was by Jeanmarie Simpson based on her 2004 play with the same title.

== Artists ==
The film stars Jeanmarie Simpson as first US Congresswoman Jeannette Rankin. Actor Judd Nelson appears, along with a cast of 16 others, many of whom play multiple roles.

Additional artists including Martin Sheen, Frances Fisher, Chandra Wilson, Peter Coyote, Patricia Arquette, Karen Black, Margot Kidder, Elizabeth Peña, and Mimi Kennedy contributed their voices to the film. The music is by Joni Mitchell.

== Production ==
The film was shot at Quixote Studios, Los Angeles, California.

== Synopsis ==
In A Single Woman, Jeanmarie Simpson portrays the character of Jeannette Rankin, beginning in 1972 and moving backwards in time to Rankin's childhood in 1880s Montana.

Experiencing the slaughter of American Indians in Montana and at Wounded Knee, Rankin was a lifelong pacifist, suffragist and human rights advocate. The film chronicles her activism including her association with the Women's International League for Peace and Freedom, as well as her co-founding the American Civil Liberties Union. Judd Nelson appears as a Jewish newspaper reporter in 1948.

== Reception ==
The film has been generally panned, though it has won a few political awards for director Lopez. Simpson has many times denounced the film as "horrible" and said that it is the biggest disappointment of her life.

== See also ==
- A Single Woman (play)
