= Kamala Lopez =

American actress and director

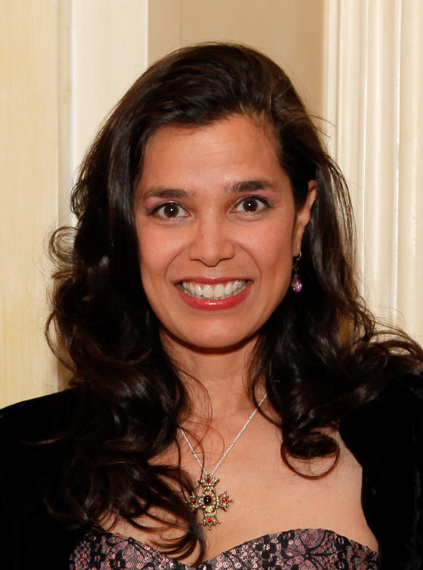
- Lopez in 2019
- Born: New York City
- Education: Yale University
- Occupation: Actress
- Years active: 1980–present

Kamala Lopez is an American filmmaker, actress, writer, director, and political activist. She has had starring roles in Black Jesus, Medium, 24, Alias, NYPD Blue, Hill Street Blues, Miami Vice, and 21 Jump Street. She has been a featured actress in films including Born in East L.A., Deep Cover, The Burning Season, Clear and Present Danger, Lightning Jack, and I Heart Huckabees.

As a filmmaker, her feature film debut, A Single Woman, about the life of first US Congresswoman Jeannette Rankin, won the 2009 Exceptional Merit in Media Award from the National Women's Political Caucus. In 2013, her short Spanish-language film Ese Beso won the Jury Award at the Senorita Cinema Festival and the Audience Award at the Boyle Heights Latina Film Festival. In 2016, her follow-up feature, the documentary Equal Means Equal, won Best U.S. Documentary (Audience Award) at Michael Moore’s TCF Festival, and was a New York Times Critics' Pick. The film was the catalyst behind a national civil rights movement pushing for the ratification of the 28th Amendment to the United States Constitution: the Equal Rights Amendment.

== Early life ==
Kamala Lopez born in New York City to an Indian mother and a Venezuelan father, Lopez lived with her parents in Caracas until age 14 when the family returned to the United States. Attended Yale University, graduating with a bachelor's degree in philosophy and theater studies.

== Career ==
Lopez has worked as an actor in more than thirty feature films, including I Heart Huckabees (2004), Born in East L.A. (1987), Deep Cover (1992), and The Burning Season (1994); and more than seventy television shows, including 21 Jump Street, Lie To Me, Alias, Star Trek: Voyager, NYPD Blue, and It's Garry Shandling's Show.

In 2007 Lopez hosted Wired Science on PBS, a production of KCET Los Angeles in association with Wired, along with comedian Chris Hardwick.

Lopez directed the Spanish-language short film Ese Beso in Madrid, Spain, starring Daniel Freire and Lia Chapman. She directed A Single Woman (2008), about the life of the first US congresswoman, Jeannette Rankin. The film was adapted from the play of the same name, written by Jeanmarie Simpson, a relative of Lopez.

Lopez produced the new media series Speechless Without Writers with director George Hickenlooper during the Writers Guild of America strike of 2007.

== Political activism ==
In 2009 Lopez created the ERA Education Project, a national media campaign to raise awareness about the Equal Rights Amendment in the United States. She interviewed women nationwide about how civil rights issues such as equal pay and domestic violence affect their daily lives.

In October 2013, she launched a Kickstarter campaign for the documentary Equal Means Equal. This project about the status of women in America also meant to revive public support for the ERA. Gloria Steinem appears in the film, along with more than 100 interviewees.

Lopez blogs for The Huffington Post.

== Awards and recognition ==
- 2019 - Yale Women Impact Award for Excellence
- 2016 - Champion of Justice - National Civil Rights Group Equal Rights Advocates
- 2016 - Best U.S Documentary Audience Award - Traverse City Film Festival
- 2016 - Latino Spirit Award for Achievement in Advocacy and Entertainment - State of California
- 2015 - Woman of the Year Award - Los Angeles County Board of Supervisors and the Women's Commission
- 2013 - Jury Award - Senorita Cinema Festival
- 2013 - Audience Award - Boyle Heights Latina Film Festival
- 2012 - Named one of the 21 Leaders for the 21st Century by Women's eNews
- 2011 - Woman of Courage Award from the National Women's Political Caucus
- 2009 - Retrospective for Work as an Actor and Director - Museum of Latin American Art
- 2009 - Exceptional Merit Media Award for A "Single Woman" - National Women's Political Caucus

== Filmography ==
=== Film ===
| Year | Title | Role | Notes |
|---|---|---|---|
| 1987 | Born in East L.A. | Dolores | |
| 1989 | Night Children | | |
| 1990 | Total Recall | Additional Voices | Voice |
| 1991 | Dollman | Debi Alejandro | Video |
| 1992 | Deep Cover | Belinda Chacon | |
| 1992 | Exiled in America | Amy / Marla Soto | |
| 1992 | Small Kill | Jenny | |
| 1994 | Erotique | Rosie (segment "Let's Talk About Love") | |
| 1994 | Lightning Jack | Pilar | |
| 1994 | Clear and Present Danger | Venezuelan Telephonist | |
| 1996 | Wedding Bell Blues | Pregnant Woman | |
| 1997 | Tupperware Party | Katie | Short film |
| 1998 | Where's Marlowe? | Penny | |
| 1999 | Love and Action in Chicago | Anna | |
| 1999 | Black and White | Carmela | |
| 2000 | Burglars | | Short film; director |
| 2003 | The $cheme | Laura | |
| 2003 | Filet of 4 | | Short film; director |
| 2004 | I Heart Huckabees | Molly Corn | |
| 2005 | The Circle | Hilga | |
| 2005 | Meet Me in Miami | Marta | |
| 2007 | Game of Life | Nadia | |
| 2007 | Permanent Vacation | Iris Garcia | |
| 2008 | Ese beso | | Short film; director |
| 2008 | A Single Woman | | Director, producer, editor |
| 2009 | The Intervention | Rachel | |
| 2009 | Mark in Argentina | Maria | Short film |
| 2012 | Any Day Now | Agent Martinez | |
| 2012 | Got Rights? | | Short film; director |
| 2012 | Los Tienes? | Herself | Short film; director, producer, writer |
| 2012 | Dark Knight Aurora | | Short film; co-director, editor, writer |
| 2015 | Slob90X | | Short film; producer |
| 2016 | Equal Means Equal | Herself | Director, producer, writer |
| 2020 | 6 Rounds of Chloë | Stella Gupta | Associate producer |

=== Television ===
| Year | Title | Role | Notes |
|---|---|---|---|
| 1986 | Miami Vice | Maria Rojas | Episode: "Definitely Miami" |
| 1986 | Spenser: For Hire | | Episode: "In a Safe Place" |
| 1987 | It's Garry Shandling's Show | Maria Herrera | Episode: "Garry Met a Girl Named Maria" |
| 1987 | Police Story: The Freeway Killings | Lydia Chacon | TV movie |
| 1987 | Hill Street Blues | Lola Martinez | Episode: "A Pound of Flesh" |
| 1988 | Stones for Ibarra | Manuela Reyes | TV movie |
| 1988 | CBS Schoolbreak Special | Alicia Rojas | Episode: "Gangs" |
| 1988 | Break of Dawn | Linda | TV movie |
| 1989 | Protect and Surf | Ramona Diaz | TV movie |
| 1989 | Hunter | Maria Gonsalves | Episode: "The Nightmare" |
| 1989-1990 | Tour of Duty | Susanna Lozada | 3 episodes |
| 1990 | Equal Justice | Brenda | Episode: "Cop's Story" |
| 1989-1990 | 21 Jump Street | Marta | 2 episodes |
| 1991 | Shoot First: A Cop's Vengeance | | TV movie |
| 1991 | Crazy from the Heart | Alcira Zavala | TV movie |
| 1992 | Murder, She Wrote | Rosa García | Episode: "Day of the Dead" |
| 1992 | Beverly Hills, 90210 | Beth Nielsen | Episode: "The Back Story" |
| 1992 | Wild Card | | TV movie |
| 1993 | Lois & Clark: The New Adventures of Superman | Carmen Alvarado | Episode: "Pilot" |
| 1994 | Walker, Texas Ranger | Mary Wells | Episode: "The Legend of Running Bear" |
| 1994 | Lifestories: Families in Crisis | Jeannie | Episode: "A Body to Die For: The Aaron Henry Story" |
| 1994 | The Burning Season: The Chico Mendes Story | Ilzamar | TV movie |
| 1995 | NYPD Blue | Maria Galvan | Episode: "Vishy-Vashy-Vinny" |
| 1998 | Vengeance Unlimited | Elena Amayo | Episode: "Security" |
| 2000 | Star Trek: Voyager | Tincoo | Episode: "Virtuoso" |
| 1995-2000 | The Eddie Files | Aunt Rosa | 16 episodes |
| 2000 | JAG | Princess Fatima 'Fannie' al-Amatula | Episode: "The Princess and the Petty Officer" |
| 2000-2001 | Resurrection Blvd. | Sulinda Serrano | 5 episodes |
| 2001 | Ice | | TV movie |
| 2002 | Alias | Dr. Lemon | Episode: "Rendezvous" |
| 2002 | The Division | Connie | Episode: "Secrets, Lies and Weddings" |
| 2003 | The Handler | Carlita | Episode: "Hardcore" |
| 2004 | 24 | Theresa Ortega | Episode: "Day 3: 12:00 p.m.-1:00 p.m." |
| 2004 | Judging Amy | Ms. Nunez | Episode: "Accountability" |
| 2005-2007 | Medium | Walter Paxton's Attorney / Paxton's Attorney / Miss Romney | 3 episodes |
| 2006 | Sideliners | | TV movie; director |
| 2009 | Lie to Me | Inez | Episode: "Control Factor" |
| 2013 | The Mentalist | Woman in Chapel | Episode: "Red John" |
| 2014 | Perception | Kenny's Foster Mom | Episode: "Brotherhood" |
| 2019 | Black Jesus | Judge | Episode: "The Compton Carter" |

== See also ==
- List of female film and television directors
