= Tom Stout =

American politician (1879–1965)

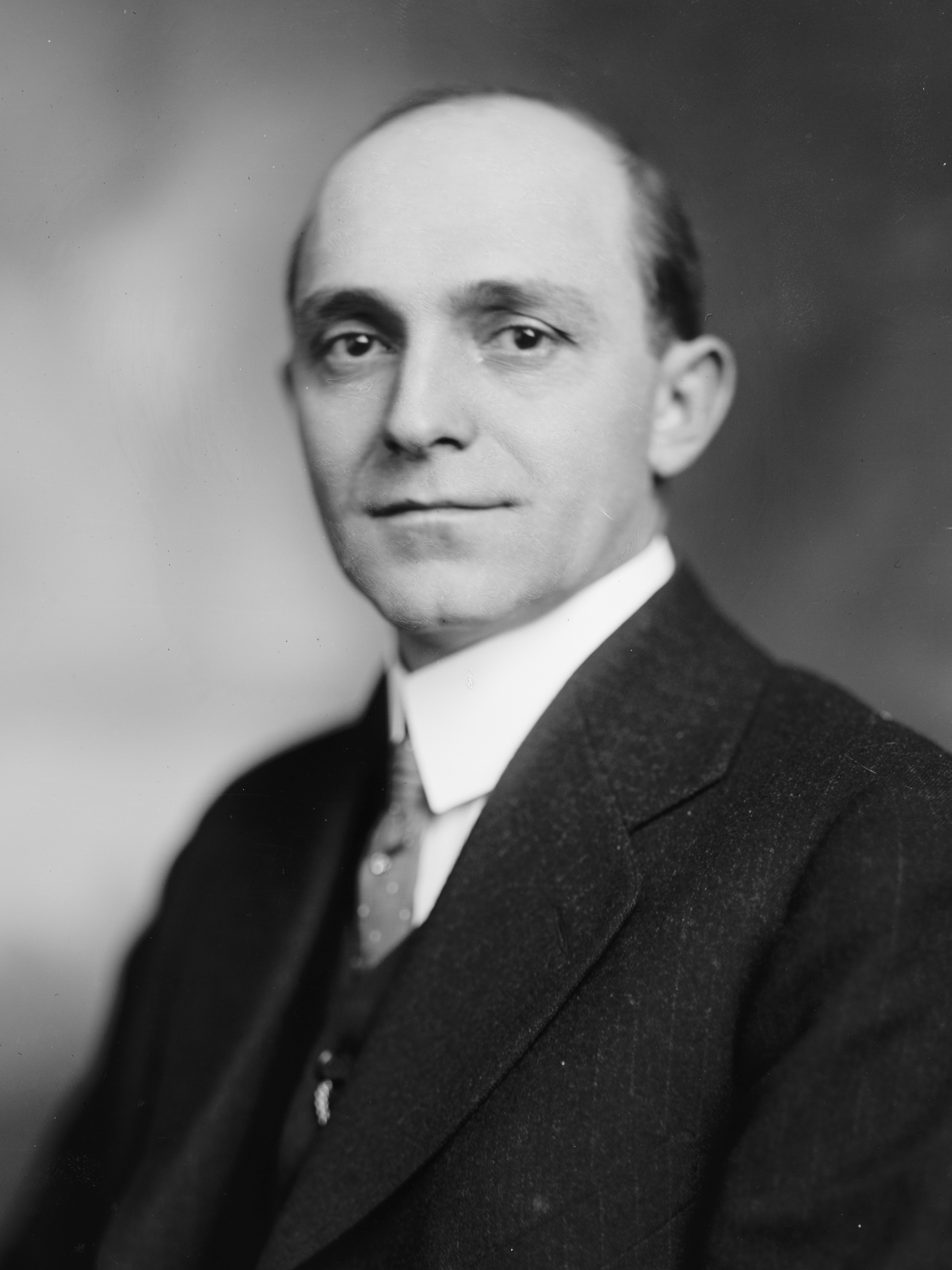
- Stout, 1905–1945

Member of the U.S. House of Representatives from Montana's at-large district
- In office March 4, 1913 – March 3, 1917 Serving with John M. Evans
- Preceded by: Charles Nelson Pray
- Succeeded by: Jeannette Rankin

Personal details
- Born: May 20, 1879 New London, Missouri, U.S.
- Died: December 26, 1965 (aged 86) Billings, Montana, U.S.
- Party: Democratic
- Education: University of Missouri at Columbia
- Profession: Newspaper editor, wheat and cattle raising

Tom Stout (May 20, 1879 – December 26, 1965) was an American lawyer, newspaperman, and politician who served two terms as a U.S. representative from Montana's at-large congressional district from March 4, 1913, to March 3, 1917.

== Biography ==
Stout was born in New London, Missouri, in 1879, and attended the University of Missouri at Columbia, where he studied and later taught law. In 1902, he moved to Lewistown, Montana, and entered publishing, working as the editor and publisher of the Fergus County Democrat from 1902 to 1916 and the Lewistown Democrat News from 1916 to 1946.

He was elected to the Montana Senate in 1910, and served until 1913.

=== Congress ===
Following the 1910 United States census, Montana gained an additional seat in the United States House of Representatives. Rather than create separate districts, the existing Montana's at-large congressional district began separately electing two members, and Stout ran for Seat B in 1912. He was narrowly elected to the seat and was re-elected in 1914. Stout did not seek re-election in 1916 and returned to Montana, continuing his work in the newspaper business.

=== Later career and death ===
In the early 1930s, Stout served as a member of the Montana Public Service Commission, and in 1942, he was elected to the Montana House of Representatives. He was subsequently re-elected in 1944 and 1946. After he exited the legislature, he worked as an editorial writer for the Billings Gazette from 1947 to 1960.

Until his death in 1965, he resided in Billings, Montana.

U.S. House of Representatives
Preceded by Seat created	Member of the U.S. House of Representatives from Montana's at-large congressional district 1913–1917	Succeeded by Jeannette Rankin
