= Charles E. Taylor (politician) =

American Communist politician (1884–1967)

Charles Edwin Taylor
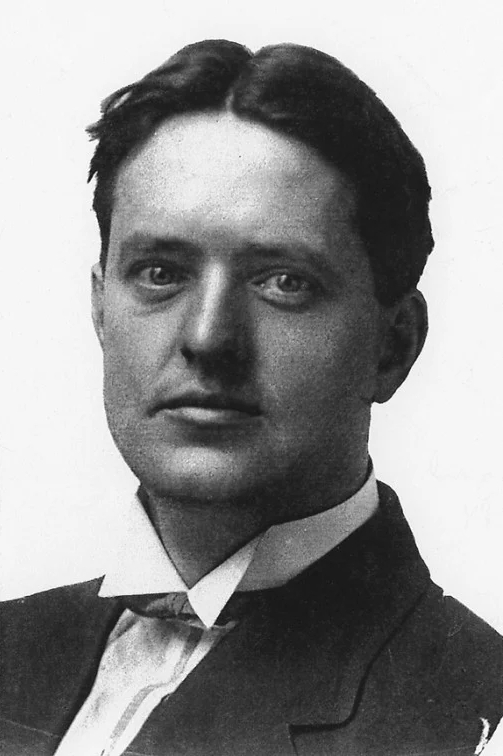
- Taylor, c. 1918

Member of the Montana Senate from the Sheridan County district
- In office January 1, 1923 – January 5, 1931
- Preceded by: Hans J. Dixon
- Succeeded by: Lars Angvick

Personal details
- Born: February 27, 1884 Wisconsin, U.S.
- Died: April 22, 1967 (aged 83) Little Falls, Minnesota, U.S.
- Resting place: Lakewood Cemetery, Minneapolis, US
- Party: Communist; Farmer–Labor; Nonpartisan League; Republican
- Spouse: Agda
- Children: 3
- Occupation: Politician, newspaper editor, orator

Charles Edwin Taylor (February 27, 1884 – April 22, 1967), also known as "Red Flag" Taylor, "Red Flag Charlie", and Charley Taylor, was an American politician, newspaper editor, and orator. He served as a member of the Montana State Senate from the Sheridan County District, from January 1, 1923, to January 5, 1931, and was candidate for United States Senate in the 1930 Election. Taylor started off as an editor of The Producers News which was a popular farmer-labor newspaper in Plentywood. He joined the Communist Party of America in 1922 but kept it a secret from the public.

During the early 1920s, Montana was affected by droughts which had farmers lose about 2 million acres of land in 11,000 farms, which was about 20% of all farm land in Montana. The first communist to be elected during this time was Rodney Salisbury, an early follower of Taylor, who served as Sheriff of Sheridan County from 1922 to 1928 due to Taylor's support. Taylor thought Salisbury was "an extremist and kind of a Wobbly type".

There was a rumor that that at about 5:45 AM on November 30, 1926, Salisbury, along with three other people, robbed the Treasurers Office getting away with $116,579.25 ($1,954,823.26 as of December 2022) in order to fund socialist activities, this rumor caused Salisbury to lose the 1928 election. On January 5, 1925, Taylor was elected to the Montana Senate. During the 1930 election for Senate, he was the Farmer-Labor Party candidate for Montana, getting 1,789 votes, with 1.02% of the total vote.
