= 1972 Montana Constitutional Convention =

1972 meeting of Montana delegates

Logo of the convention

The 1972 Montana Constitutional Convention, colloquially known as the Con-Con, took place in Helena, Montana, at the state capitol from January 17 until March 11, 1972. 100 delegates, including 58 Democrats, 36 Republicans, and 6 Independents, represented the state of Montana with the goal of creating a new state constitution. The constitution proposed by the convention was signed by all 100 delegates on March 24, 1972, before being sent to the voters for ratification. In June 1972, Montanans agreed to ratify the new document by a margin of 2,532 votes (50.55% of the vote was in favor).

== Background ==
In 1967, Montana's legislature called on the legislative council to determine if the 1889 constitution, which had been in effect since the time of statehood, was adequately serving the needs of the people. Two years later, in 1969, the council recommended the creation of a constitutional revision commission. The legislature agreed to create one the same year. The newly-formed constitutional revision commission decided that a constitutional convention would be the best way to fix the issues of the 1889 constitution; in a referendum, on November 3, 1970, Montana voters agreed to allowing the state legislature to call a convention with 64.76% of the vote. In 1971, Montana's legislature passed the needed legislation to call for a convention.

=== Election of delegates ===
==== Primary election ====
For the September 14, 1971, primary election for becoming a delegate at the convention, 515 citizens filed. Montana elected officials were prohibited from running, as the Montana Supreme Court had ruled in 1971 that becoming a delegate while already holding office would be the equivalent of holding two separate offices at the same time. Of the individuals who filed, 247 were Democrats, 232 were Republicans, 32 were Independents, and 4 were from the New Reform Party. In the September 1971 primary election, 148 Democrats and 132 Republicans were eliminated, leaving 99 Democrats, 100 Republicans, and the Independent and New Reform candidates on the ballot for the general election.

==== General election ====
On November 2, 1971, the general election was held, with 58 Democrats, 36 Republicans, and 6 Independents being elected for the 100 delegate positions. Of the 100, 19 were women, which was described as "a remarkable leap forward" by the news magazine Missoula Current, because at the time, in 1971, only 2 of the state's 156 legislators were women. Of those elected, 24 were lawyers, 20 were farmers and ranchers, 17 were business owners, 13 were housewives, five were clergymen, four were media employees, one was a beekeeper, and one was a retired FBI agent.

== Convention ==
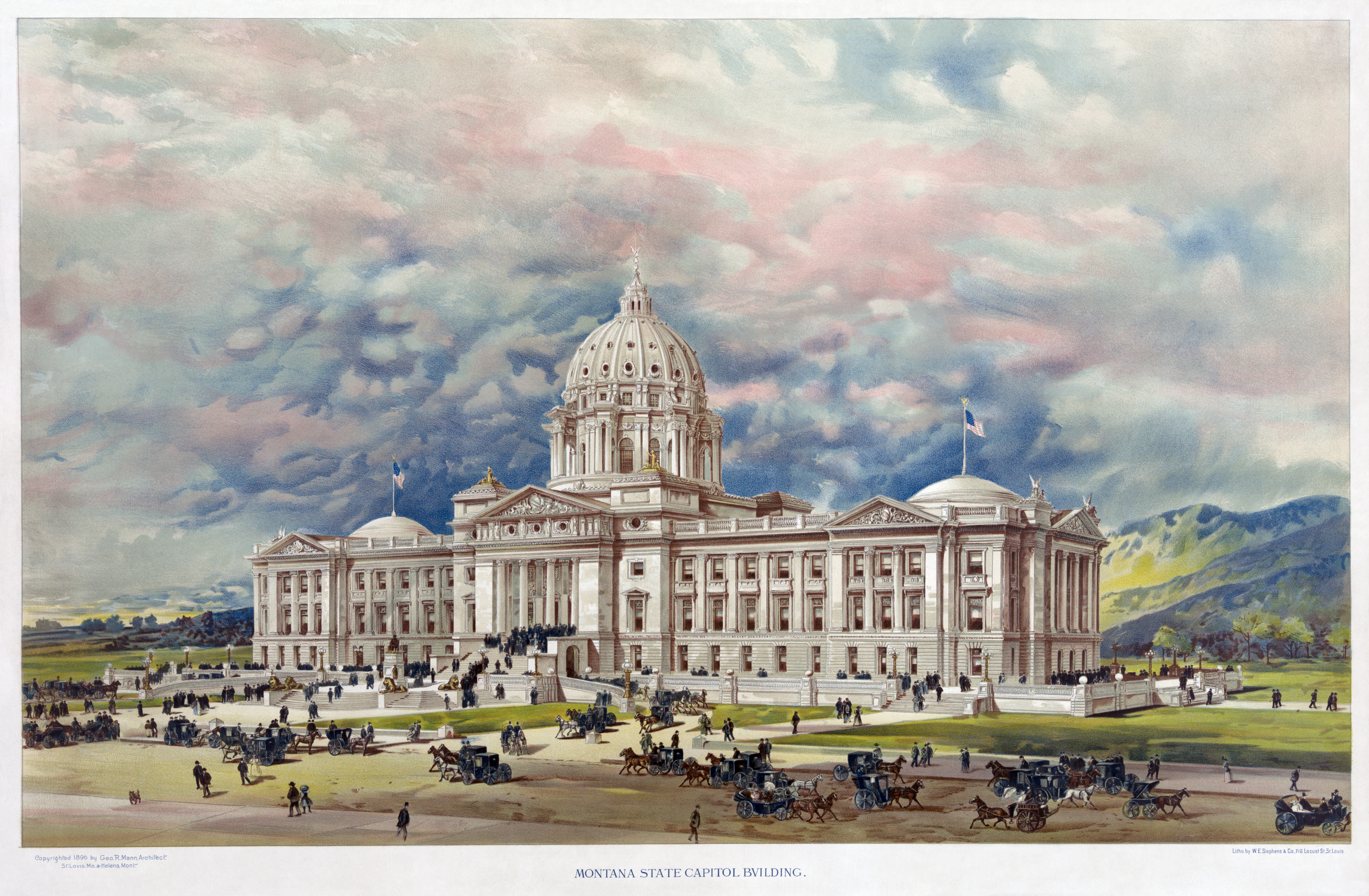
The Montana state capitol

Delegates first met on January 17, 1972, in Helena, Montana, at the state capitol, which is where the constitutional convention took place. At the convention, which was referred to as the "Con-Con," delegates sat in alphabetical order. This was different than as is done in Montana's legislature, where politicians sit with members of the same political party on different sides of the aisle. Also, in another move of bipartisanship, the Democratic majority agreed to grant the Republican minority some power, with Democrat Leo Graybill being elected president, and Republican John Toole being picked as the vice president. Both the right to privacy and right to a clean and healthful environment provisions of Montana's constitution that were adopted by this convention were written and advocated for by Bob Campbell.

The convention lasted for 54 days, with the last day being March 11. On March 24, delegates signed the proposed document and adjourned. Other important individuals, such as Governor Forrest Anderson, attended the signing.

== Ratification ==
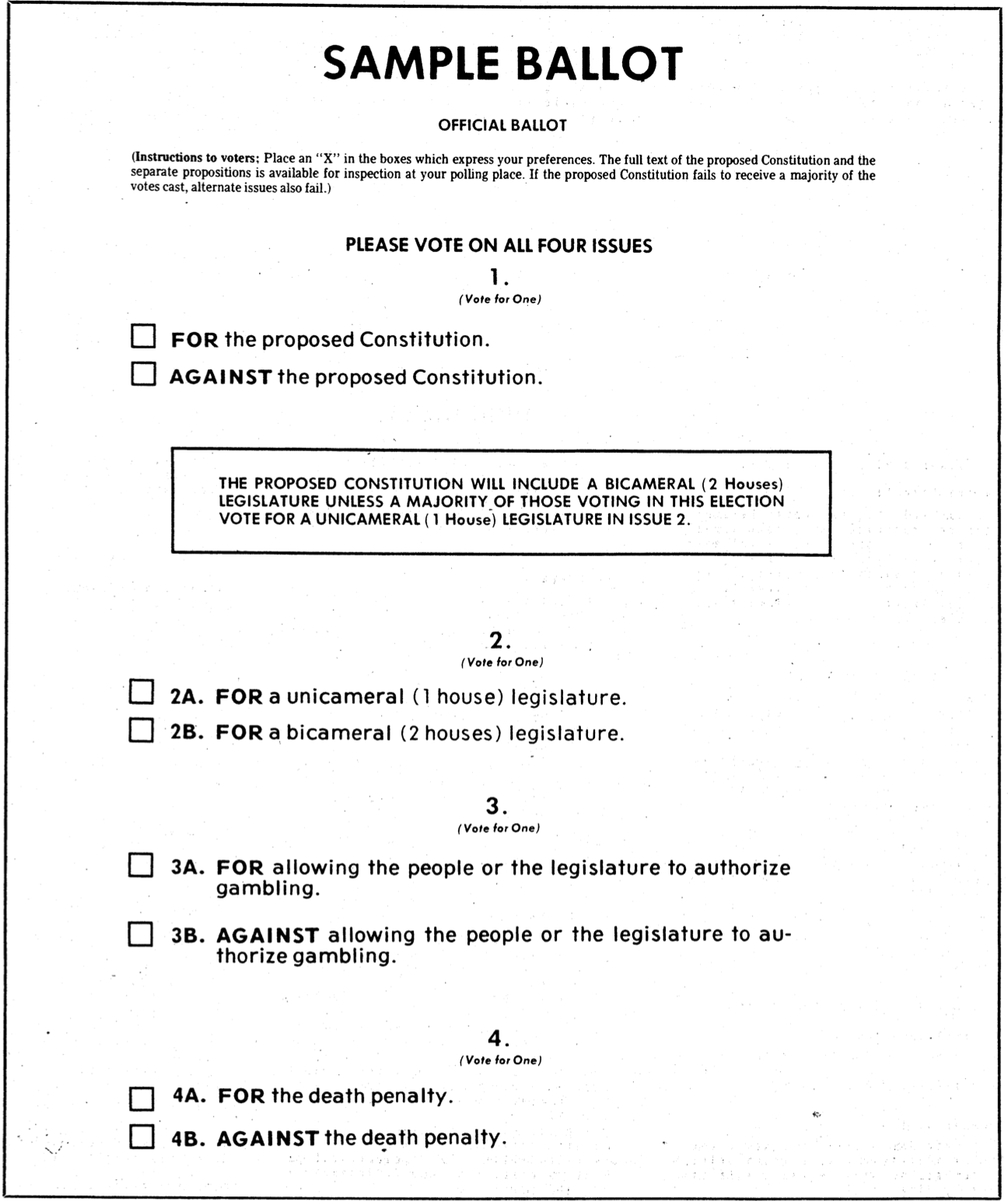
A sample of the ballot that voters were given for the June 6, 1972 referendums.

On June 6, 1972, a special election was held to allow for voters to decide whether the constitution would be ratified, along with 3 other questions. On the ballot, the first question asked if the 1972 constitution should ratified; the second asked if the state legislature should be unicameral or bicameral; the third asked if the people or the legislature should have the power to authorize gambling; and the fourth asked if the death penalty should be allowed. The three, separate questions were believed to be too controversial, and delegates feared if they were put in the proposed constitution, the ratification would fail. As such, they were separately voted on. If the proposed constitution had failed, the other questions would have failed regardless of if any or all of them had a majority-vote in favor.

Ratification of 1972 Constitution
- June 6, 1972

Results
Choice	Votes	%
Yes	116,415	50.55%
No	113,883	49.45%
Yes
70–80%
60–70%
50–60%
No
80–90%
70–80%
60–70%
50–60%

=== 1972 Constitution ===
On the question of ratifying the constitution as a whole, voters narrowly agreed, with 50.55% casting a vote in the affirmative. The highest level of support came from Deer Lodge County, with 70.97% in favor, and the lowest level came from Powder River County, with 18.11% in favor.

The following table details the results by county of the referendum:

County	Yes		No	
County	#	%	#	%
Beaverhead	996	36.01	1,770	63.99
Big Horn	1,119	42.71	1,501	57.29
Blaine	817	36.95	1,394	63.05
Broadwater	308	26.81	841	73.19
Carbon	1,172	39.17	1,820	60.83
Carter	145	19.28	607	80.72
Cascade	13,792	62.95	8,117	37.05
Chouteau	1,063	36.27	1,868	63.73
Custer	2,178	56.66	1,666	43.34
Daniels	483	42.29	659	57.71
Dawson	1,826	51.68	1,707	48.32
Deer Lodge	3,880	70.97	1,587	29.03
Fallon	284	23.79	910	76.21
Fergus	1,639	34.58	3,101	65.42
Flathead	6,959	58.98	4,840	41.02
Gallatin	5,514	47.89	5,999	52.11
Garfield	156	20.94	589	79.06
Glacier	1,079	43.06	1,427	56.94
Golden Valley	180	36.36	315	63.64
Granite	416	38.34	669	61.66
Hill	2,694	49.99	2,695	50.01
Jefferson	806	44.75	995	55.25
Judith Basin	462	33.48	918	66.52
Lake	1,842	39.37	2,837	60.63
Lewis and Clark	7,926	59.28	5,444	40.72
Liberty	402	36.91	687	63.09
Lincoln	2,462	58.49	1,747	41.51
Madison	626	29.44	1,500	70.56
McCone	418	36.07	741	63.93
Meagher	185	23.81	592	76.19
Mineral	610	55.56	488	44.44
Missoula	13,271	66.44	6,703	33.56
Musselshell	724	45.17	879	54.83
Park	2,033	47.88	2,213	52.12
Petroleum	61	24.60	187	75.40
Phillips	530	26.79	1,448	73.21
Pondera	1,422	55.66	1,133	44.34
Powder River	195	18.11	882	81.89
Powell	808	33.86	1,578	66.14
Prairie	174	22.48	600	77.52
Ravalli	2,851	53.67	2,461	46.33
Richland	1,290	41.83	1,794	58.17
Roosevelt	1,067	37.77	1,758	62.23
Rosebud	497	29.92	1,164	70.08
Sanders	878	38.90	1,379	61.10
Sheridan	837	40.73	1,218	59.27
Silver Bow	7,738	46.86	8,774	53.14
Stillwater	862	43.19	1,134	56.81
Sweet Grass	411	28.84	1,014	71.16
Teton	1,201	44.12	1,521	55.88
Toole	961	41.19	1,372	58.81
Treasure	138	27.82	358	72.18
Valley	1,730	46.69	1,975	53.31
Wheatland	410	37.72	677	62.28
Wibaux	146	27.29	389	72.71
Yellowstone	13,741	55.00	11,241	45.00
Total	116,415	50.55	113,883	49.45

=== State legislature ===
Legislature structure referendum
- June 6, 1972

Results
Choice	Votes	%
Unicameral	95,259	43.76%
Bicameral	122,425	56.24%
Unicameral
50–60%
Bicameral
70–80%
60–70%
50–60%

On the question of whether the state legislature should change to unicameral or remain bicameral (as it had been since statehood in 1889), the bicameral option won, with 56.24% casting a vote for it. The highest level of support for the legislature being unicameral came from Missoula County, with 54.68%, and the highest level of support for the legislature being bicameral came from Treasure County, with 78.18%.

The following table details the results by county of the referendum:

County	Yes		No	
County	#	%	#	%
Beaverhead	822	31.54	1,784	68.46
Big Horn	1,009	40.59	1,477	59.41
Blaine	763	36.77	1,312	63.23
Broadwater	411	37.85	675	62.15
Carbon	1,134	41.06	1,628	58.94
Carter	167	24.27	521	75.73
Cascade	10,789	51.23	10,270	48.77
Chouteau	925	33.25	1,857	66.75
Custer	1,442	38.23	2,330	61.77
Daniels	303	28.80	749	71.20
Dawson	1,215	36.06	2,154	63.94
Deer Lodge	2,627	51.84	2,441	48.16
Fallon	345	32.39	720	67.61
Fergus	1,558	34.74	2,927	65.26
Flathead	5,786	51.03	5,552	48.97
Gallatin	4,839	44.02	6,154	55.98
Garfield	191	27.09	514	72.91
Glacier	972	41.40	1,376	58.60
Golden Valley	119	25.54	347	74.46
Granite	392	38.93	615	61.07
Hill	2,043	39.75	3,096	60.25
Jefferson	747	45.05	911	54.95
Judith Basin	391	30.52	890	69.48
Lake	1,742	40.46	2,564	59.54
Lewis and Clark	7,039	54.14	5,962	45.86
Liberty	300	28.54	751	71.46
Lincoln	1,837	46.20	2,139	53.80
Madison	601	30.23	1,387	69.77
McCone	258	23.41	844	76.59
Meagher	244	32.80	500	67.20
Mineral	444	42.13	610	57.87
Missoula	10,256	54.68	8,501	45.32
Musselshell	524	34.70	986	65.30
Park	1,648	40.11	2,461	59.89
Petroleum	71	30.21	164	69.79
Phillips	611	32.92	1,245	67.08
Pondera	855	35.03	1,586	64.97
Powder River	249	24.78	756	75.22
Powell	750	34.06	1,452	65.94
Prairie	170	24.82	515	75.18
Ravalli	2,081	41.09	2,983	58.91
Richland	983	35.11	1,817	64.89
Roosevelt	837	31.80	1,795	68.20
Rosebud	517	33.01	1,049	66.99
Sanders	829	39.95	1,246	60.05
Sheridan	587	32.18	1,237	67.82
Silver Bow	6,640	44.14	8,402	55.86
Stillwater	722	38.63	1,147	61.37
Sweet Grass	409	30.50	932	69.50
Teton	916	35.73	1,648	64.27
Toole	747	33.71	1,469	66.29
Treasure	103	21.82	369	78.18
Valley	1,181	33.94	2,299	66.06
Wheatland	390	38.50	623	61.50
Wibaux	151	30.82	339	69.18
Yellowstone	11,577	48.39	12,347	51.61
Total	95,259	43.76	122,425	56.24

=== Gambling ===
1972 Montana gambling referendum
- June 6, 1972

Results
Choice	Votes	%
Yes	139,382	61.10%
No	88,743	38.90%
Yes
70–80%
60–70%
50–60%
No
50–60%

On the question of whether the people or the state legislature should be allowed to authorize gambling, voters agreed, with 61.10% in favor. Gambling had been illegal under the 1889 constitution. The highest level of support came from Mineral County, with 73.46% in favor, and the lowest level came from McCone County, with 43.46% in favor.

The following table details the results by county of the referendum:

County	Yes		No	
County	#	%	#	%
Beaverhead	1,684	61.71	1,045	38.29
Big Horn	1,469	55.94	1,157	44.06
Blaine	1,196	54.12	1,014	45.88
Broadwater	685	60.19	453	39.81
Carbon	1,588	54.31	1,336	45.69
Carter	372	49.21	384	50.79
Cascade	14,481	66.59	7,267	33.41
Chouteau	1,587	54.65	1,317	45.35
Custer	2,659	67.35	1,289	32.65
Daniels	584	51.18	557	48.82
Dawson	2,031	57.11	1,525	42.89
Deer Lodge	3,834	69.82	1,657	30.18
Fallon	603	51.80	561	48.20
Fergus	2,758	58.73	1,938	41.27
Flathead	7,124	60.67	4,619	39.33
Gallatin	5,924	52.39	5,383	47.61
Garfield	346	46.26	402	53.74
Glacier	1,680	67.52	808	32.48
Golden Valley	303	61.71	188	38.29
Granite	755	69.59	330	30.41
Hill	3,053	57.00	2,303	43.00
Jefferson	1,176	66.78	585	33.22
Judith Basin	790	58.52	560	41.48
Lake	2,640	57.47	1,954	42.53
Lewis and Clark	8,029	60.40	5,264	39.60
Liberty	606	55.55	485	44.45
Lincoln	2,436	57.53	1,798	42.47
Madison	1,290	61.60	804	38.40
McCone	505	43.46	657	56.54
Meagher	498	63.76	283	36.24
Mineral	811	73.46	293	26.54
Missoula	13,127	67.41	6,347	32.59
Musselshell	1,000	62.81	592	37.19
Park	2,684	63.21	1,562	36.79
Petroleum	129	53.75	111	46.25
Phillips	969	48.23	1,040	51.77
Pondera	1,470	57.22	1,099	42.78
Powder River	579	53.61	501	46.39
Powell	1,387	59.48	945	40.52
Prairie	409	53.67	353	46.33
Ravalli	3,287	62.45	1,976	37.55
Richland	1,659	55.15	1,349	44.85
Roosevelt	1,482	53.44	1,291	46.56
Rosebud	1,019	61.27	644	38.73
Sanders	1,356	60.08	901	39.92
Sheridan	903	45.31	1,090	54.69
Silver Bow	11,879	72.80	4,439	27.20
Stillwater	1,144	58.04	827	41.96
Sweet Grass	700	50.14	696	49.86
Teton	1,421	53.00	1,260	47.00
Toole	1,525	64.87	826	35.13
Treasure	270	54.33	227	45.67
Valley	1,942	52.86	1,732	47.14
Wheatland	663	61.96	407	38.04
Wibaux	324	58.70	228	41.30
Yellowstone	14,557	59.08	10,084	40.92
Total	139,382	61.10	88,743	38.90

=== Death penalty ===
Death penalty referendum
- June 6, 1972

Results
Choice	Votes	%
Yes	147,023	65.41%
No	77,733	34.59%
Yes
70–80%
60–70%
50–60%

On the question of the death penalty, over 65% voted in favor of allowing it. The highest level of support came from Sweet Grass County, with 79.54% in favor, and the lowest level came from Sheridan County, with 54.10% in favor.

The following table details the results by county of the referendum:

County	Yes		No	
County	#	%	#	%
Beaverhead	2,094	77.87	595	22.13
Big Horn	1,431	55.85	1,131	44.15
Blaine	1,315	60.88	845	39.12
Broadwater	814	72.55	308	27.45
Carbon	1,888	65.01	1,016	34.99
Carter	504	69.14	225	30.86
Cascade	14,454	67.26	7,037	32.74
Chouteau	2,197	76.79	664	23.21
Custer	2,353	61.20	1,492	38.80
Daniels	694	61.80	429	38.20
Dawson	1,997	57.75	1,461	42.25
Deer Lodge	3,232	60.23	2,134	39.77
Fallon	746	65.55	392	34.45
Fergus	3,366	73.35	1,223	26.65
Flathead	7,577	65.47	3,996	34.53
Gallatin	7,581	67.06	3,724	32.94
Garfield	576	78.37	159	21.63
Glacier	1,540	62.53	923	37.47
Golden Valley	356	72.95	132	27.05
Granite	811	75.94	257	24.06
Hill	3,140	59.50	2,137	40.50
Jefferson	1,214	69.85	524	30.15
Judith Basin	1,022	77.13	303	22.87
Lake	3,113	68.36	1,441	31.64
Lewis and Clark	8,919	67.85	4,227	32.15
Liberty	715	67.07	351	32.93
Lincoln	2,709	65.07	1,454	34.93
Madison	1,565	76.68	476	23.32
McCone	793	70.43	333	29.57
Meagher	600	77.52	174	22.48
Mineral	705	65.16	377	34.84
Missoula	11,238	58.37	8,015	41.63
Musselshell	1,122	71.74	442	28.26
Park	3,129	74.75	1,057	25.25
Petroleum	184	76.03	58	23.97
Phillips	1,376	70.46	577	29.54
Pondera	1,733	69.24	770	30.76
Powder River	706	66.48	356	33.52
Powell	1,720	74.69	583	25.31
Prairie	461	63.76	262	36.24
Ravalli	3,617	69.54	1,584	30.46
Richland	1,745	59.56	1,185	40.44
Roosevelt	1,629	59.41	1,113	40.59
Rosebud	1,149	70.62	478	29.38
Sanders	1,552	69.97	666	30.03
Sheridan	1,049	54.10	890	45.90
Silver Bow	9,766	61.07	6,225	38.93
Stillwater	1,427	73.52	514	26.48
Sweet Grass	1,100	79.54	283	20.46
Teton	2,009	74.93	672	25.07
Toole	1,672	71.94	652	28.06
Treasure	310	63.92	175	36.08
Valley	2,205	60.93	1,414	39.07
Wheatland	744	71.20	301	28.80
Wibaux	320	58.50	227	41.50
Yellowstone	15,039	61.80	9,294	38.20
Total	147,023	65.41	77,733	34.59
