= 1924 United States Senate election in Montana =

- November 4, 1924
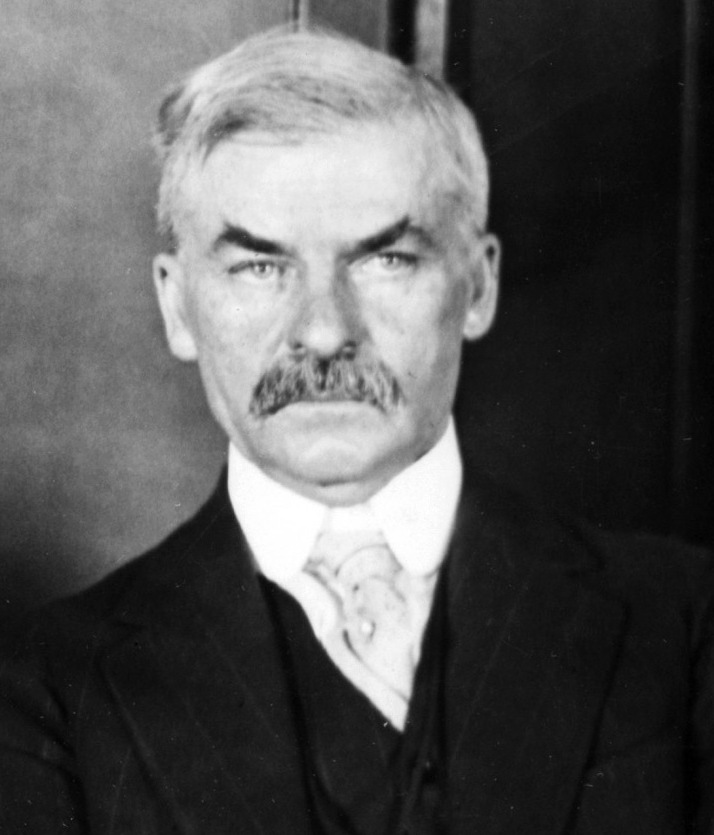

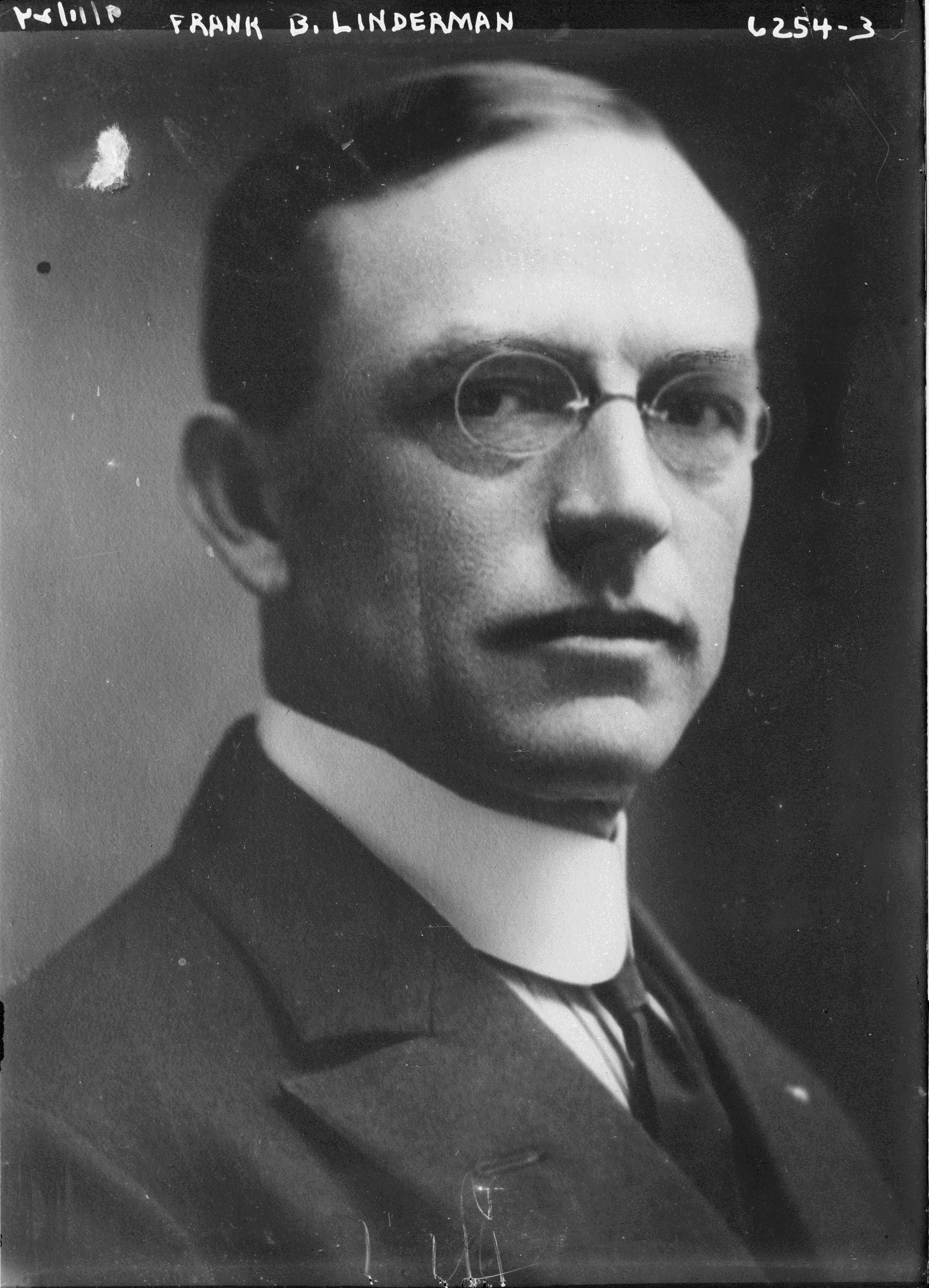
Nominee	Thomas J. Walsh	Frank Bird Linderman
Party	Democratic	Republican
Popular vote	89,681	72,000
Percentage	52.81%	42.40%
- County results Walsh: 40–50% 50–60% 60–70% Linderman: 40–50% 50–60% Anderson: 50–60%
U.S. senator before election
Thomas J. Walsh
Democratic
Elected U.S. Senator
Thomas J. Walsh
Democratic

The 1924 United States Senate election in Montana took place on November 4, 1924. Incumbent United States Senator Thomas J. Walsh, who was first elected to the Senate in 1912 by the state legislature (as was the practice then), and re-elected in 1918 by popular vote (in accordance with the 17th Amendment), ran for re-election. He was unopposed in the Democratic primary.

He faced former State Representative Frank Bird Linderman and several independent opponents in the general election. Walsh ultimately won re-election to his third term by a solid margin.

== Democratic primary ==
=== Candidates ===
- Thomas J. Walsh, incumbent United States Senator

=== Results ===
Democratic Party primary results
Party	Candidate	Votes	%
Democratic	Thomas J. Walsh (incumbent)	35,029	100.00%
Total votes		35,029	100.00%

== Farmer-Labor primary ==
=== Candidates ===
- J. W. Anderson

=== Results ===
Farmer-Labor Primary results
Party	Candidate	Votes	%
Farmer–Labor	J. W. Anderson	2,827	100.00%
Total votes		2,827	100.00%

== Republican primary ==
=== Candidates ===
- Frank Bird Linderman, former State Representative, former Assistant Secretary of State of Montana
- Wellington D. Rankin, Attorney General of Montana
- John W. Allison
- R. W. Kemp

=== Results ===
Republican Primary results
Party	Candidate	Votes	%
Republican	Frank Bird Linderman	29,336	41.83%
Republican	Wellington D. Rankin	28,216	40.24%
Republican	John W. Allison	9,053	12.91%
Republican	R. W. Kemp	3,520	5.02%
Total votes		70,125	100.00%

== General election ==
=== Results ===
United States Senate election in Montana, 1924
Party	Candidate	Votes	%	±%
Democratic	Thomas J. Walsh (incumbent)	89,681	52.81%	+11.74%
Republican	Frank Bird Linderman	72,000	42.40%	+6.61%
Farmer–Labor	J. W. Anderson	7,370	4.34%	
Socialist	Charles F. Juttner	522	0.31%	
Independent	Sam W. Teagarden	248	0.15%	
Majority		17,681	10.41%	+5.13%
Turnout		169,821		
Democratic hold		Swing		
