= 1924 United States Senate elections =

- November 4, 1924
- Class 2

32 of the 96 seats in the United States Senate 49 seats needed for a majority
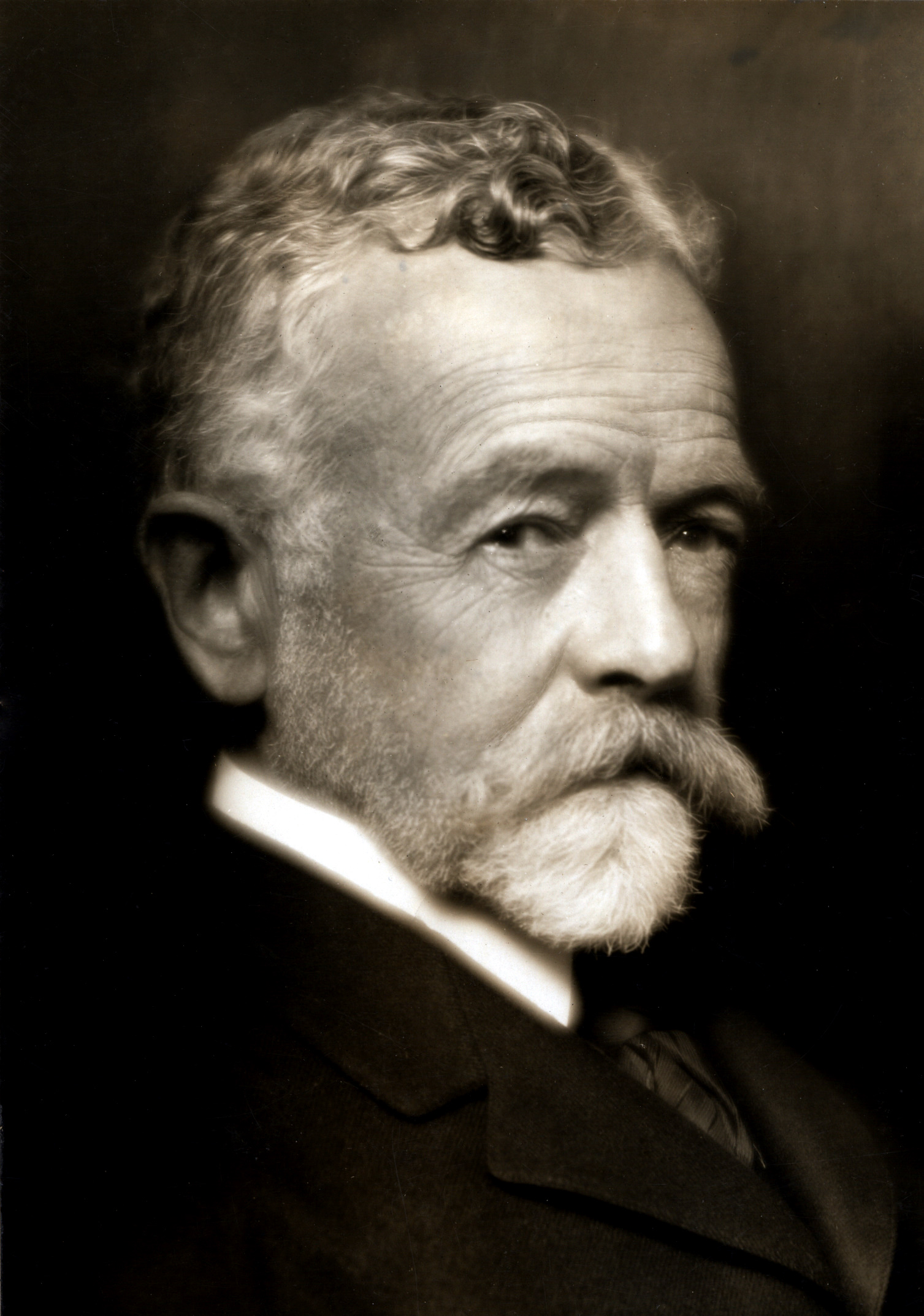

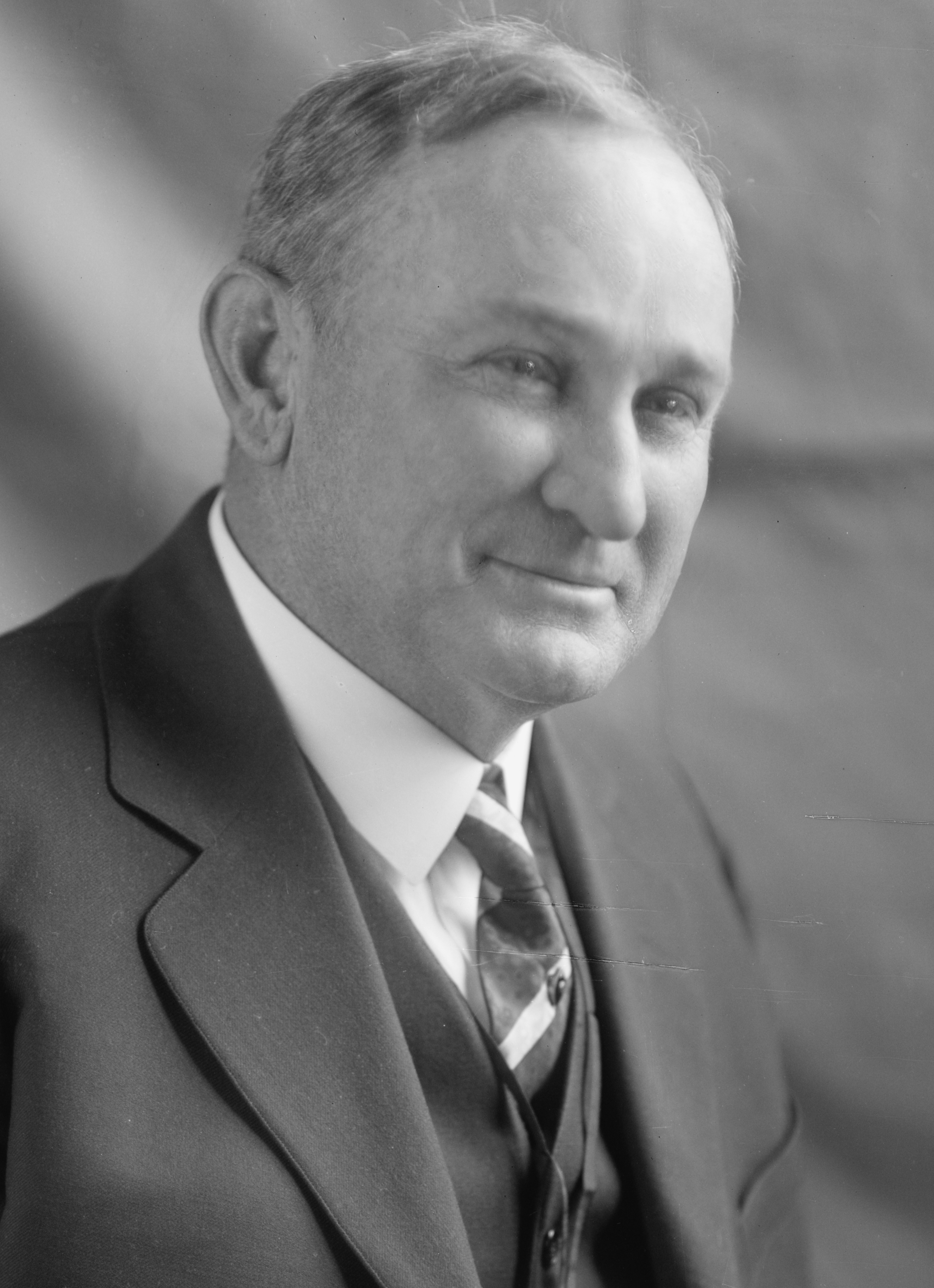
	Majority party	Minority party
Leader	Henry Cabot Lodge (unofficial)	Joseph Robinson
Party	Republican	Democratic
Leader since	March 4, 1919	December 3, 1923
Leader's seat	Massachusetts	Arkansas
Seats before	51	43
Seats after	55	40
Seat change	▲4	▼3
Seats up	17	14
Seats won	21	11
	Third party
Party	Farmer–Labor
Seats before	2
Seats after	1
Seat change	▼1
Seats up	1
Seats won	0
- Results of the elections: Democratic gain Democratic hold Republican gain Republican hold No election
Majority Leader before election
Henry Cabot Lodge
Republican
Elected Majority Leader
Charles Curtis
Republican

The 1924 United States Senate elections were elections for the United States Senate which coincided with the election of Republican President Calvin Coolidge to a full term. The 32 seats of Class 2 were contested in regular elections, and special elections were held to fill vacancies. The strong economy and Coolidge's popularity helped Republican candidates increase their majority by three. Republicans would gain another seat through mid-term vacancies, bringing their seat share to 56–39–1.

== Gains, losses, and holds ==
=== Retirements ===
Three Republicans and two Democrats retired instead of seeking re-election.

State	Senator	Replaced by
Colorado (special)	Alva B. Adams	Rice W. Means
Connecticut	Frank B. Brandegee	Hiram Bingham III
Oklahoma	Robert L. Owen	William B. Pine
Rhode Island	LeBaron B. Colt	Jesse H. Metcalf
West Virginia	Davis Elkins	Guy D. Goff

=== Defeats ===
Four Democrats, four Republicans, and one Farmer-Labor candidate sought re-election but lost in the primary or general election.

State	Senator	Replaced by
Delaware	L. Heisler Ball	T. Coleman du Pont
Illinois	Medill McCormick	Charles S. Deneen
Kentucky	Augustus O. Stanley	Frederic M. Sackett
Massachusetts	David I. Walsh	Frederick H. Gillett
Minnesota	Magnus Johnson	Thomas D. Schall
New Mexico	Holm O. Bursum	Sam G. Bratton
South Carolina	Nathaniel B. Dial	Cole L. Blease
South Dakota	Thomas Sterling	William H. McMaster
Tennessee	John K. Shields	Lawrence Tyson

=== Post-election changes ===
State	Senator	Replaced by
Iowa (class 2)	Smith W. Brookhart	Daniel F. Steck
Iowa (class 3)	Albert B. Cummins	David W. Stewart
Indiana	Samuel M. Ralston	Arthur R. Robinson
Maine	Bert M. Fernald	Arthur R. Gould
Missouri	Selden P. Spencer	George H. Williams
Wisconsin	Robert M. La Follette	Robert M. La Follette Jr.

== Change in composition ==
=== Before the elections ===
At the beginning of 1924.

		D_{1}	D_{2}	D_{3}	D_{4}	D_{5}	D_{6}	D_{7}	D_{8}
D_{18}	D_{17}	D_{16}	D_{15}	D_{14}	D_{13}	D_{12}	D_{11}	D_{10}	D_{9}
D_{19}	D_{20}	D_{21}	D_{22}	D_{23}	D_{24}	D_{25}	D_{26}	D_{27}	D_{28}
D_{38} N.C. Ran	D_{37} Mont. Ran	D_{36} Miss. Ran	D_{35} Mass. Ran	D_{34} La. Ran	D_{33} Ky. Ran	D_{32} Ga. Ran	D_{31} Colo. (sp); Retired	D_{30} Ark. Ran	D_{29} Ala. Ran
D_{39} Okla. Retired	D_{40} S.C. Ran	D_{41} Tenn. Ran	D_{42} Texas; Ran	D_{43} Va. Ran	FL_{1}	FL_{2} Minn. Ran	R_{51} Wyo. Ran	R_{50} W.Va. Hold	R_{49} S.D. Ran
Majority →									R_{49} S.D. Ran
R_{39} Iowa; Ran	R_{40} Kan. Ran	R_{41} Maine; Ran	R_{42} Mich. (reg); Mich. (sp); Ran	R_{43} Neb. Ran	R_{44} N.H. Ran	R_{45} N.J. Ran	R_{46} N.M. Ran	R_{47} Ore. Ran	R_{48} R.I. (reg); R.I. (sp); Died
R_{38} Ill. Ran	R_{37} Idaho; Ran	R_{36} Del. Ran	R_{35} Conn. (sp); Died	R_{34} Colo. (reg); Ran	R_{33}	R_{32}	R_{31}	R_{30}	R_{29}
R_{19}	R_{20}	R_{21}	R_{22}	R_{23}	R_{24}	R_{25}	R_{26}	R_{27}	R_{28}
R_{18}	R_{17}	R_{16}	R_{15}	R_{14}	R_{13}	R_{12}	R_{11}	R_{10}	R_{9}
		R_{1}	R_{2}	R_{3}	R_{4}	R_{5}	R_{6}	R_{7}	R_{8}

=== Election results ===
		D_{1}	D_{2}	D_{3}	D_{4}	D_{5}	D_{6}	D_{7}	D_{8}
D_{18}	D_{17}	D_{16}	D_{15}	D_{14}	D_{13}	D_{12}	D_{11}	D_{10}	D_{9}
D_{19}	D_{20}	D_{21}	D_{22}	D_{23}	D_{24}	D_{25}	D_{26}	D_{27}	D_{28}
D_{38} Tenn. Hold	D_{37} S.C. Hold	D_{36} N.C. Re-elected	D_{35} N.M. Gain	D_{34} Mont. Re-elected	D_{33} Miss. Re-elected	D_{32} La. Re-elected	D_{31} Ga. Re-elected	D_{30} Ark. Re-elected	D_{29} Ala. Re-elected
D_{39} Texas; Re-elected	D_{40} Va. Re-elected	FL_{1}	R_{55} Wyo. Re-elected	R_{54} W.Va. Hold	R_{53} S.D. Hold	R_{52} R.I. (reg); R.I. (sp); Elected (Note: Appointee elected)	R_{51} Ore. Re-elected	R_{50} Okla. Gain	R_{49} N.J. Re-elected
Majority →									R_{49} N.J. Re-elected
R_{39} Ill. Hold	R_{40} Iowa; Re-elected	R_{41} Kan. Re-elected	R_{42} Ky. Gain	R_{43} Maine; Re-elected	R_{44} Mass. Gain	R_{45} Mich. (reg); Mich. (sp); Elected	R_{46} Minn. Gain	R_{47} Neb. Re-elected	R_{48} N.H. Re-elected
R_{38} Idaho; Re-elected	R_{37} Del. Hold	R_{36} Conn. (sp); Hold	R_{35} Colo. (sp); Gain	R_{34} Colo. (reg); Re-elected	R_{33}	R_{32}	R_{31}	R_{30}	R_{29}
R_{19}	R_{20}	R_{21}	R_{22}	R_{23}	R_{24}	R_{25}	R_{26}	R_{27}	R_{28}
R_{18}	R_{17}	R_{16}	R_{15}	R_{14}	R_{13}	R_{12}	R_{11}	R_{10}	R_{9}
		R_{1}	R_{2}	R_{3}	R_{4}	R_{5}	R_{6}	R_{7}	R_{8}

Key

D_{#}	Democratic
FL_{#}	Farmer–Labor
R_{#}	Republican

== Race summaries ==
=== Special elections during the 68th Congress ===
In these special elections, the winners were seated during 1924 or before March 4, 1925; ordered by election date.

State	Incumbent			Results	Candidates
State	Senator	Party	Electoral history	Results	Candidates
Colorado (Class 3)	Alva B. Adams	Democratic	1923 (appointed)	Interim appointee retired to run for the Class 2 seat, see below. New senator elected November 4, 1924. Republican gain.	▌ ✓ Rice W. Means (Republican) 50.2%; ▌Morrison Shafroth (Democratic) 43.7%; ▌Charles T. Phelps (Independent) 5.5%; ▌Clyde Robinson (Independent) 0.6%
Michigan (Class 2)	James Couzens	Republican	1922 (appointed)	Interim appointee elected November 4, 1924.	▌ ✓ James Couzens (Republican) 74.3%; ▌Mortimer E. Cooley (Democratic) 24.6%; Others: ▌Frank E. Titus (Prohibition) 0.7%; ▌Logan M. Cunningham (Socialist Labor) 0.3%; ▌Albert L. Day (Socialist) 0.1%
Rhode Island (Class 2)	LeBaron B. Colt	Republican	1913; 1918	Incumbent died August 18, 1924. New senator elected November 4, 1924. Republican hold. Winner was also elected to the next term; see below.	▌ ✓ Jesse H. Metcalf (Republican) 56.4%; ▌William S. Flynn (Democratic) 42.6%; Others: ▌James P. Reid (Workers) 0.6%; ▌Edward M. Sullivan (Liberal Independent) 0.4%
Connecticut (Class 3)	Frank B. Brandegee	Republican	1905 (special); 1909; 1914; 1920	Incumbent died October 14, 1924. New senator elected December 16, 1924. Republican hold.	▌ ✓ Hiram Bingham III (Republican) 60.4%; ▌Hamilton Holt (Democratic) 38.6%; ▌Martin Plunkett (Democratic) 1.0%

=== Elections leading to the 69th Congress ===
In these general elections, the winners were elected for the term beginning March 4, 1925; ordered by state.

All of the elections involved the Class 2 seats.

State	Incumbent			Results	Candidates
State	Senator	Party	Electoral history	Results	Candidates
Alabama	J. Tom Heflin	Democratic	1920 (special)	Incumbent re-elected.	▌ ✓ J. Tom Heflin (Democratic) 75.2%; ▌F. H. Lathrop (Republican) 24.8%
Arkansas	Joseph T. Robinson	Democratic	1913; 1918	Incumbent re-elected.	▌ ✓ Joseph T. Robinson (Democratic) 73.5%; ▌Charles F. Cole (Republican) 26.5%
Colorado	Lawrence C. Phipps	Republican	1918	Incumbent re-elected.	▌ ✓ Lawrence C. Phipps (Republican) 50.2%; ▌Alva B. Adams (Democratic) 43.9%; ▌Morton Alexander (Independent) 5.0%; Others: ▌Elwood Hillis (Independent) 0.5%; ▌James Albert Ayres (Independent) 0.4%
Delaware	L. Heisler Ball	Republican	1903 (special); 1906 (lost); 1918	Incumbent lost renomination. Republican hold.	▌ ✓ T. Coleman du Pont (Republican) 59.4%; ▌James M. Tunnell (Democratic) 40.6%
Georgia	William J. Harris	Democratic	1918	Incumbent re-elected.	▌ ✓ William J. Harris (Democratic); Unopposed
Idaho	William Borah	Republican	1907; 1913; 1918	Incumbent re-elected.	▌ ✓ William Borah (Republican) 79.5%; ▌Frank Martin (Democratic) 20.1%; ▌Eugene F. Gary (Democratic) 0.4%
Illinois	Medill McCormick	Republican	1918	Incumbent lost renomination. Republican hold. Incumbent then died and winner was appointed to finish the current term.	▌ ✓ Charles S. Deneen (Republican) 63.5%; ▌Albert A. Sprague (Democratic) 35.4%; Others: ▌George Koop (Socialist) 0.8%; ▌Albert Wirth (Socialist Labor) 0.1%; ▌J. Louis Engdahl (Workers) 0.1%; ▌Lewis D. Spaulding (Socialist) 0.0%; ▌Parke Longworth (Independent) 0.0%
Iowa	Smith W. Brookhart	Republican	1922 (special)	Incumbent re-elected. Election was later successfully challenged after the new senator had been seated.	▌ ✓ Smith W. Brookhart (Republican) 50.0%; ▌Daniel F. Steck (Democratic) 49.8%; Others: ▌Luther Brewer (Ind. Republican) 0.1%; ▌L. E. Eickelberg (Independent) 0.1%
Kansas	Arthur Capper	Republican	1918	Incumbent re-elected.	▌ ✓ Arthur Capper (Republican) 70.1%; ▌James Malone (Democratic) 25.2%; ▌Fred J. Farley (Independent) 3.8%; ▌S. O. Coble (Socialist) 0.9%
Kentucky	Augustus O. Stanley	Democratic	1918	Incumbent lost re-election. Republican gain.	▌ ✓ Frederic M. Sackett (Republican) 51.6%; ▌Augustus O. Stanley (Democratic) 48.4%
Louisiana	Joseph E. Ransdell	Democratic	1912; 1918	Incumbent re-elected.	▌ ✓ Joseph E. Ransdell (Democratic); Unopposed
Maine	Bert M. Fernald	Republican	1916 (special); 1918	Incumbent re-elected.	▌ ✓ Bert M. Fernald (Republican) 60.4%; ▌Fulton J. Redman (Democratic) 28.2%
Massachusetts	David I. Walsh	Democratic	1918	Incumbent lost re-election. Republican gain.	▌ ✓ Frederick H. Gillett (Republican) 50.3%; ▌David I. Walsh (Democratic) 48.6%; ▌Antoinette Konikow (Workers) 1.1%
Michigan	James Couzens	Republican	1918	Incumbent re-elected.	▌ ✓ James Couzens (Republican) 74.3%; ▌Mortimer E. Cooley (Democratic) 24.6%; Others: ▌Frank E. Titus (Prohibition) 0.7%; ▌Logan M. Cunningham (Socialist Labor) 0.3%; ▌Albert L. Day (Socialist) 0.1%
Minnesota	Magnus Johnson	Farmer–Labor	1923 (special)	Incumbent lost re-election. Republican gain.	▌ ✓ Thomas D. Schall (Republican) 46.5%; ▌Magnus Johnson (Farmer–Labor) 45.5%; ▌John J. Farrell (Democratic) 6.4%; Others: ▌Merle Birmingham (Beer-Wine) 1.0%; ▌Thomas Keefe (Independent) 0.6%
Mississippi	Pat Harrison	Democratic	1918	Incumbent re-elected.	▌ ✓ Pat Harrison (Democratic); Unopposed
Montana	Thomas J. Walsh	Democratic	1913; 1918	Incumbent re-elected.	▌ ✓ Thomas J. Walsh (Democratic) 52.8%; ▌Frank Bird Linderman (Republican) 42.4%; ▌J. W. Anderson (Farmer–Labor) 4.3%; Others: ▌Charles F. Juttner (Socialist) 0.3%; ▌Sam W. Teagarden (Independent) 0.2%
Nebraska	George W. Norris	Republican	1913; 1918	Incumbent re-elected.	▌ ✓ George W. Norris (Republican) 62.4%; ▌J. J. Thomas (Democratic) 37.6%
New Hampshire	Henry W. Keyes	Republican	1918	Incumbent re-elected.	▌ ✓ Henry W. Keyes (Republican) 59.8%; ▌George E. Farrand (Democratic) 40.2%
New Jersey	Walter E. Edge	Republican	1918	Incumbent re-elected.	▌ ✓ Walter E. Edge (Republican) 61.8%; ▌Frederick W. Donnelly (Democratic) 33.7%; ▌George L. Record (Progressive) 3.8%; Others: ▌Grafton E. Day (Prohibition) 0.4%; ▌Rudolf Vollgraf (Workers) 0.1%; ▌John C. Butterworth (Socialist Labor) 0.1%; ▌Herman G. Loew (Commonwealth Land) 0.0%
New Mexico	Holm O. Bursum	Republican	1921 (appointed); 1921 (special)	Incumbent lost re-election. Democratic gain.	▌ ✓ Sam G. Bratton (Democratic) 49.9%; ▌Holm O. Bursum (Republican) 47.4%
North Carolina	F. M. Simmons	Democratic	1901; 1907; 1913; 1918	Incumbent re-elected.	▌ ✓ F. M. Simmons (Democratic) 61.6%; ▌A. A. Whitener (Republican) 38.5%
Oklahoma	Robert L. Owen	Democratic	1907; 1913; 1918	Incumbent retired. Republican gain.	▌ ✓ William B. Pine (Republican) 61.6%; ▌Jack C. Walton (Democratic) 35.4%; ▌George Wilson (Farmer–Labor) 2.9%
Oregon	Charles L. McNary	Republican	1917 (appointed); 1918 (not elected); 1918 (appointed); 1918	Incumbent re-elected.	▌ ✓ Charles L. McNary (Republican) 66.0%; ▌Milton A. Miller (Democratic) 24.7%; ▌F. E. Coulter (Progressive) 7.7%; ▌R. Robinson (Socialist Labor) 1.7%
Rhode Island	LeBaron B. Colt	Republican	1913; 1918	Incumbent died August 18, 1924. New senator elected. Republican hold. Winner was also elected to finish the current term; see above.	▌ ✓ Jesse H. Metcalf (Republican) 57.6%; ▌William S. Flynn (Democratic) 41.8%; Others: ▌Edward M. Sullivan (Liberal Independent) 0.2%; ▌James P. Reid (Workers) 0.2%; ▌Peter McDermott (Socialist Labor) 0.1%
South Carolina	Nathaniel B. Dial	Democratic	1918	Incumbent lost renomination. Democratic hold.	▌ ✓ Cole L. Blease (Democratic); Unopposed
South Dakota	Thomas Sterling	Republican	1913; 1918	Incumbent lost renomination. Republican hold.	▌ ✓ William H. McMaster (Republican) 45.4%; ▌U. S. G. Cherry (Democratic) 32.1%; ▌Tom Ayres (Farmer–Labor) 12.1%; ▌George W. Egan (Independent) 7.2%; Others: ▌Charles Hall Dillon (Independent) 2.0%; ▌[FNU] Loucks (Independent) 0.7%; ▌Don Livingston (Independent) 0.6%
Tennessee	John K. Shields	Democratic	1913; 1918	Incumbent lost renomination. Democratic hold.	▌ ✓ Lawrence Tyson (Democratic) 57.3%; ▌Hugh B. Lindsay (Republican) 42.6%; ▌S. B. Williams (Independent) 0.1%
Texas	Morris Sheppard	Democratic	1913 (special); 1913; 1918	Incumbent re-elected.	▌ ✓ Morris Sheppard (Democratic) 85.4%; ▌T. M. Kennerly (Republican) 14.6%
Virginia	Carter Glass	Democratic	1920; 1920 (special)	Incumbent re-elected.	▌ ✓ Carter Glass (Democratic) 73.1%; ▌W. N. Noak (Republican) 24.2%; ▌Carroll L. Riker (Progressive) 0.8%
West Virginia	Davis Elkins	Republican	1911 (appointed); 1911 (retired); 1918	Incumbent retired. Republican hold.	▌ ✓ Guy D. Goff (Republican) 50.9%; ▌William E. Chilton (Democratic) 47.7%; ▌M. S. Holt (Socialist) 1.4%
Wyoming	Francis E. Warren	Republican	1895; 1901; 1907; 1913; 1918	Incumbent re-elected.	▌ ✓ Francis E. Warren (Republican) 55.2%; ▌Robert R. Rose (Democratic) 44.8%; ▌G. E. Kindler (Progressive) 2.9%; ▌William B. Guthrie (Independent) 1.0%

== Closest races ==
Eight races had a margin of victory under 10%:

State	Party of winner	Margin
Iowa	Republican	0.1%
Minnesota	Republican (flip)	1.0%
Massachusetts	Republican (flip)	1.7%
New Mexico	Democratic (flip)	2.5%
Kentucky	Republican (flip)	3.12%
West Virginia	Republican	3.2%
Colorado (regular)	Republican	6.3%
Colorado (special)	Republican (flip)	6.5%

The tipping point state was Wyoming, with a margin of 10.4%.

== Alabama ==
1924 United States Senate election in Alabama
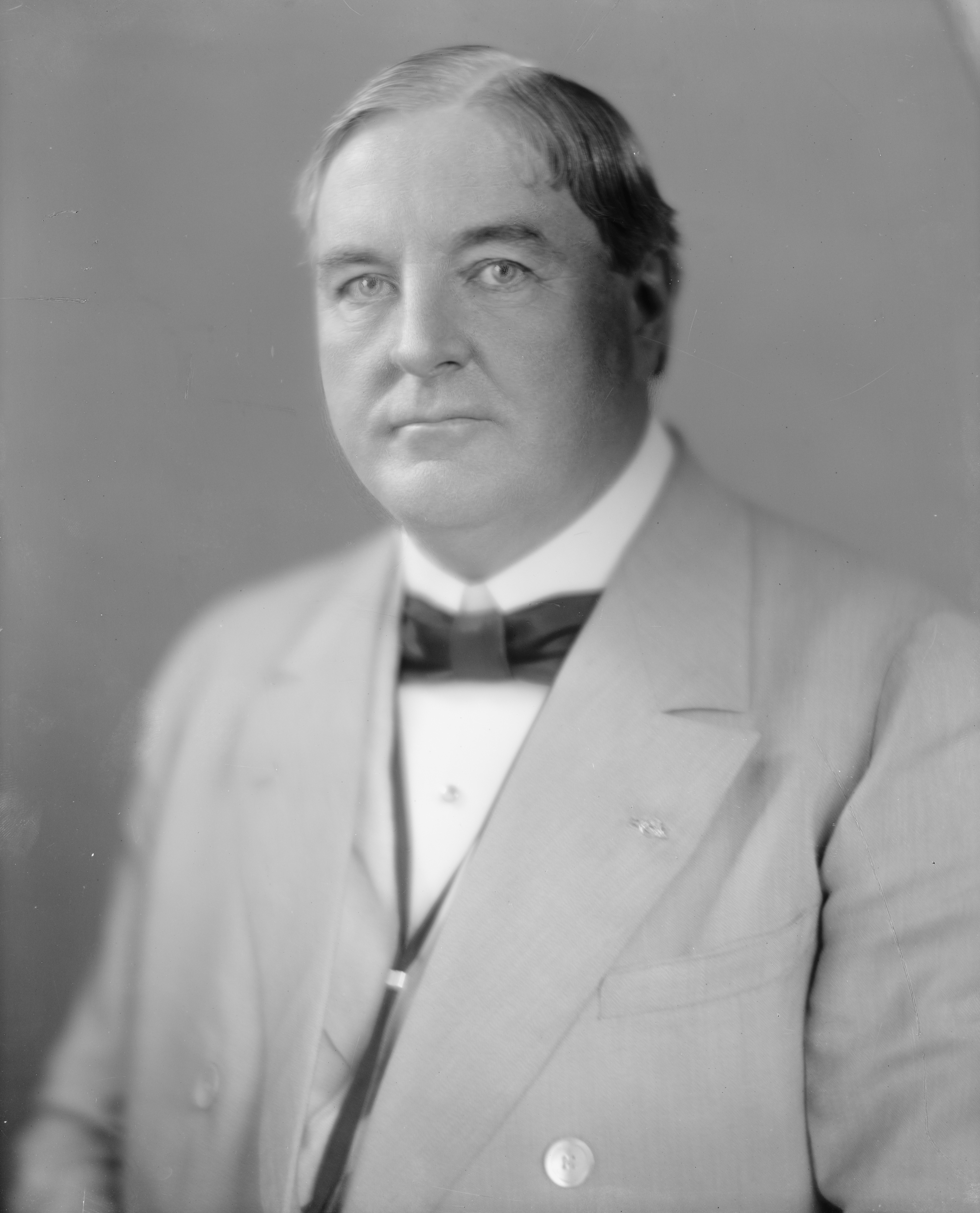

Candidate	J. Thomas Heflin	Frank H. Lathrop
Party	Democratic	Republican
Popular vote	120,017	39,818
Percentage	75.18%	24.82%
- County results Heflin: 50–60% 60–70% 70–80% 80–90% >90% Lathrop: 50–60% 60–70% No vote
U.S. senator before election
J. Thomas Heflin
Democratic
Elected U.S. Senator
J. Thomas Heflin
Democratic

1924 United States Senate election in Alabama
Party	Candidate	Votes	%
Democratic	J. Thomas Heflin (incumbent)	120,017	75.18%
Republican	Frank H. Lathrop	39,623	24.82%
Majority		80,394	50.36%
Turnout		159,640	
Democratic hold			

== Arkansas ==
1924 United States Senate election in Arkansas
- November 4, 1924
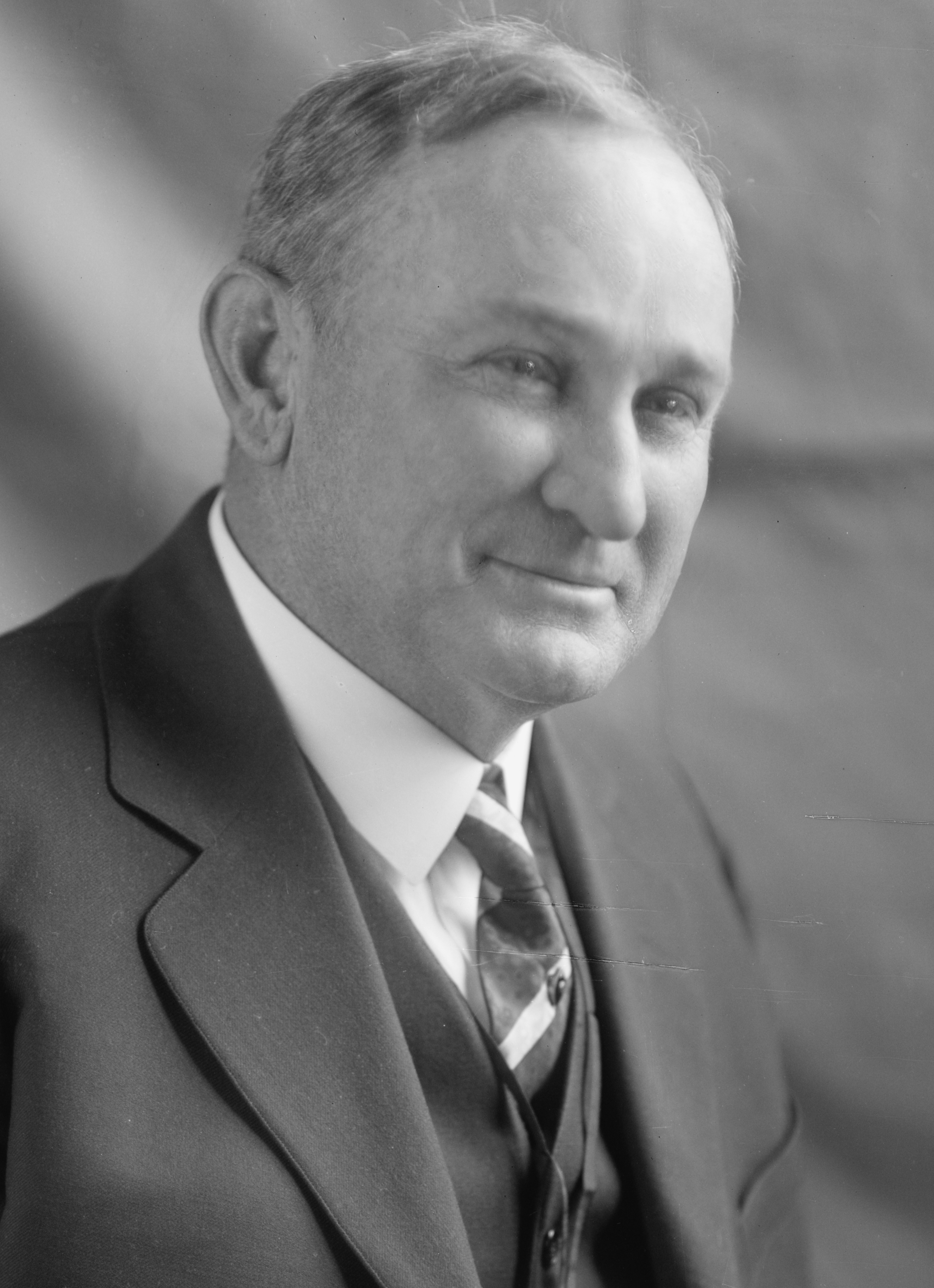

Nominee	Joe T. Robinson	Charles F. Cole
Party	Democratic	Republican
Popular vote	100,408	36,163
Percentage	73.52%	26.48%
- County results Robinson: 50–60% 60–70% 70–80% 80–90% >90% Cole: 50–60%
U.S. senator before election
Joseph Taylor Robinson
Democratic
Elected U.S. Senator
Joseph Taylor Robinson
Democratic

1924 United States Senate election in Arkansas
Party	Candidate	Votes	%
Democratic	Joseph T. Robinson (incumbent)	100,408	73.52%
Republican	Charles F. Cole	36,163	26.48%
Majority		64245	47.04%
Turnout		136571	
Democratic hold			

== Colorado ==
′=== Colorado (special) ===

1924 United States Senate special election in Colorado
- November 4, 1924
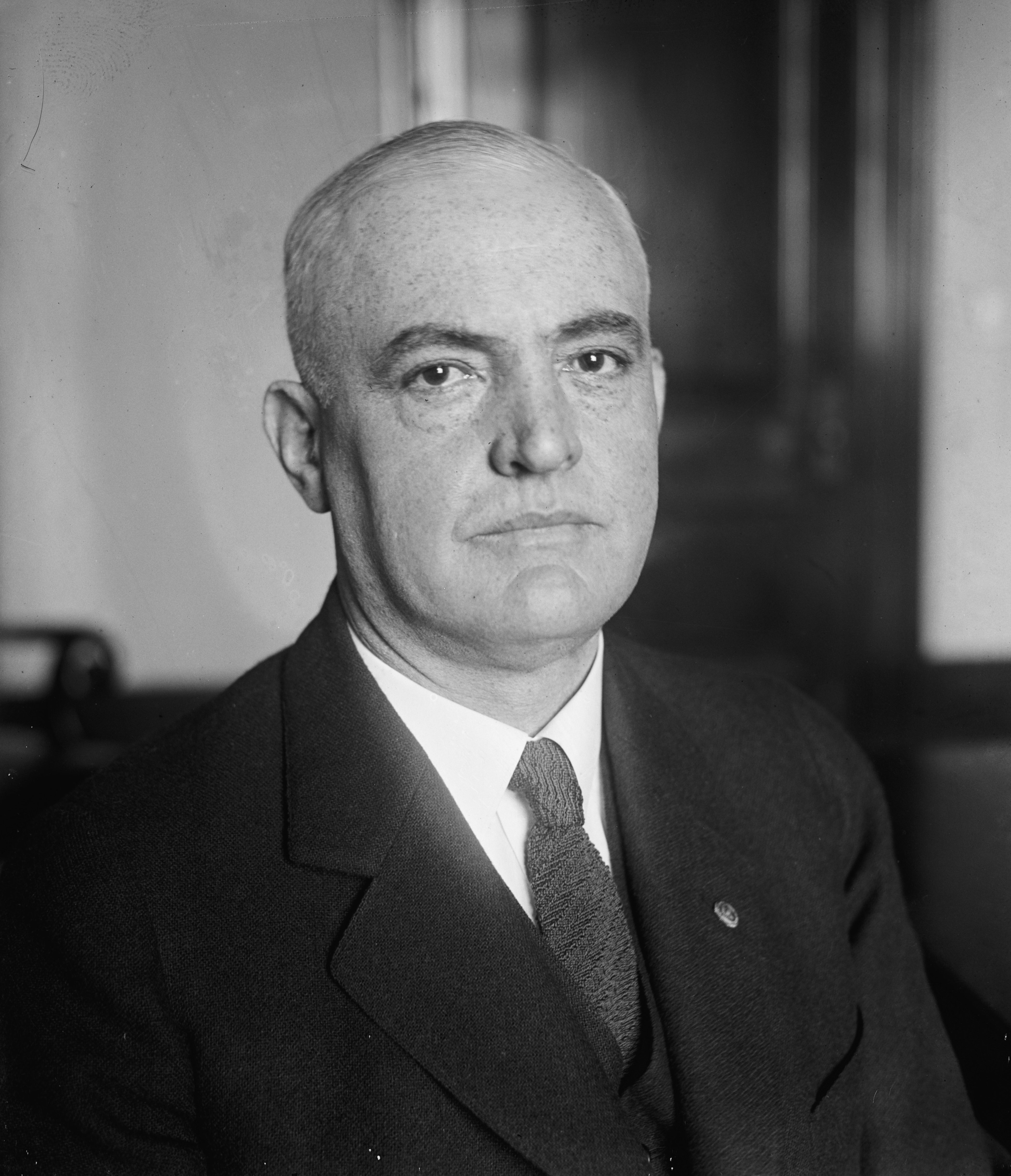
Nominee	Rice W. Means	Morrison Shafroth	Charles T. Philp
Party	Republican	Democratic	Farmer–Labor
Popular vote	159,353	138,714	17,542
Percentage	50.17%	43.67%	5.52%
- County results Means: 40–50% 50–60% 60–70% Shafroth: 40–50% 50–60%
U.S. senator before election
Alva B. Adams
Democratic
Elected U.S. Senator
Rice W. Means
Republican

1924 United States Senate special election in Colorado
Party	Candidate	Votes	%
Republican	Rice W. Means	159,353	50.17%
Democratic	Morrison Shafroth	138,714	43.67%
Independent	Charles T. Philip	17,542	5.52%
Independent	Clyde Robinson	2,012	0.63%
Majority		20,639	6.50%
Turnout		317,621	
Republican gain from Democratic			

=== Colorado (regular) ===
1924 United States Senate election in Colorado
- November 4, 1924
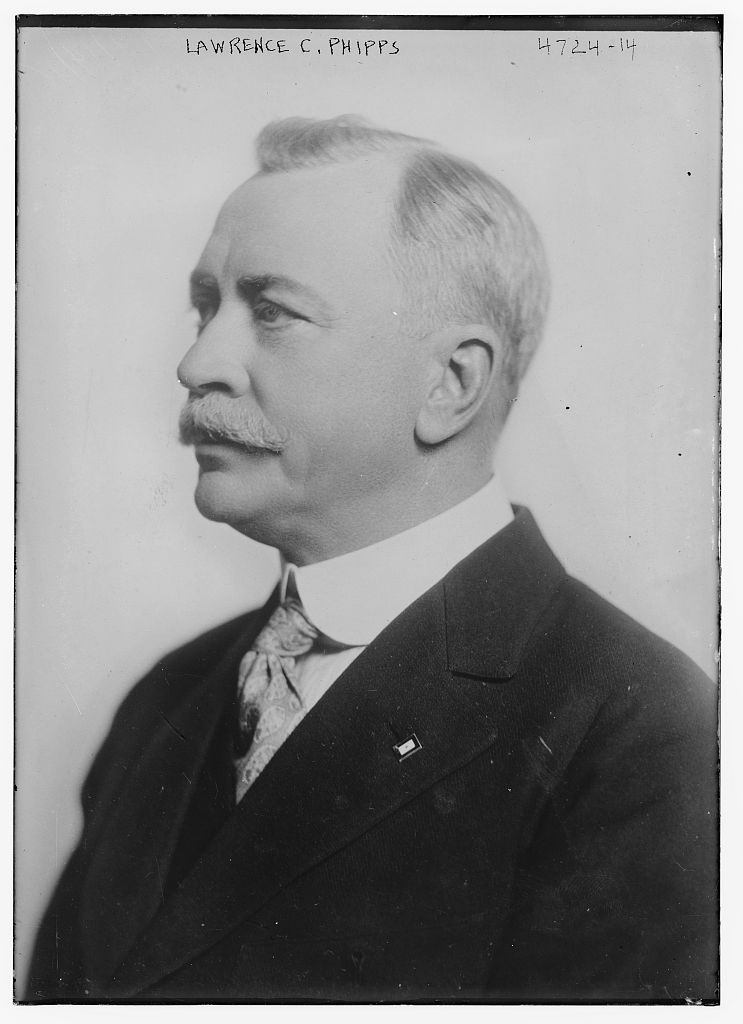

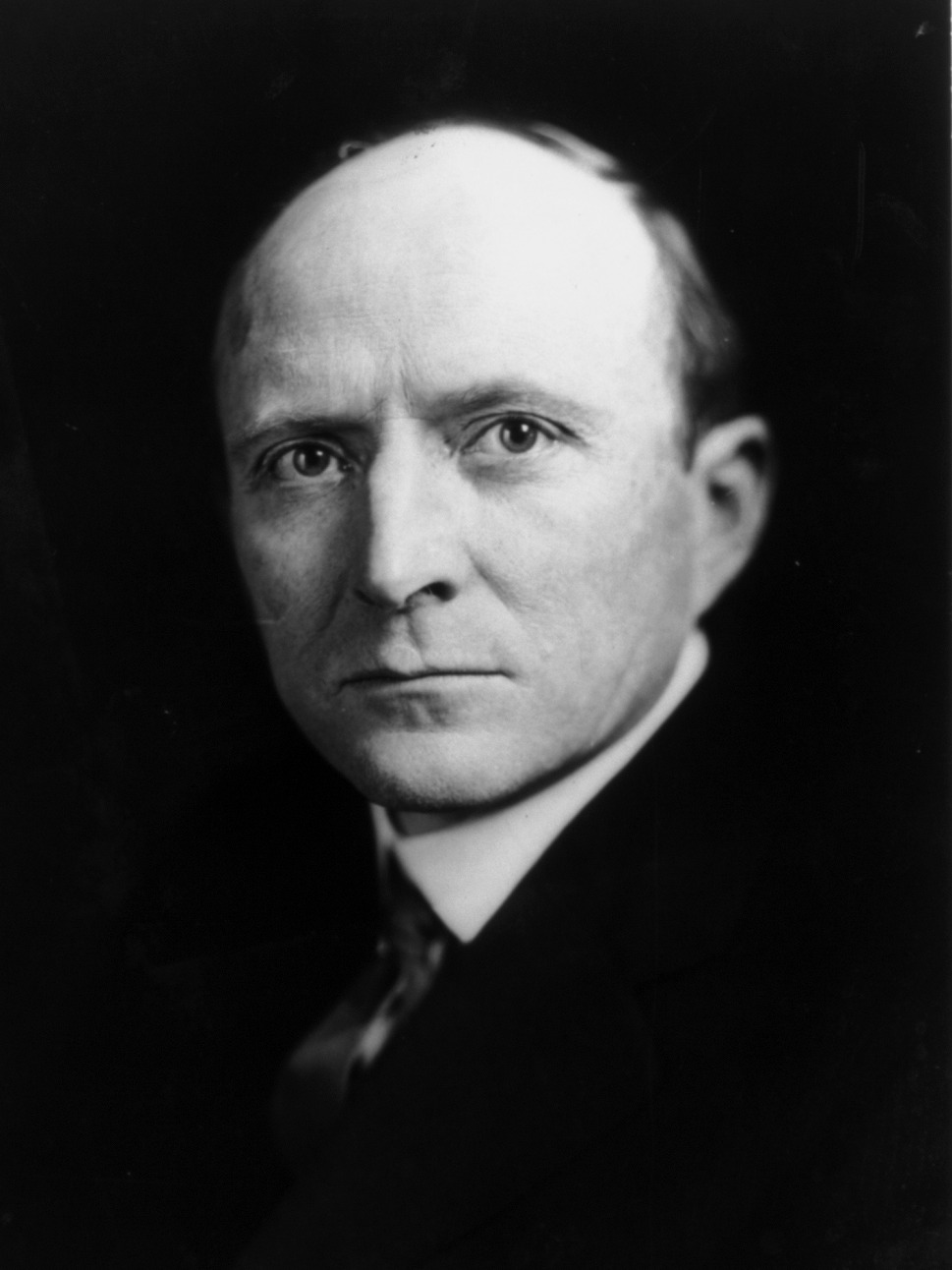
Nominee	Lawrence C. Phipps	Alva B. Adams
Party	Republican	Democratic
Popular vote	159,698	139,660
Percentage	50.19%	43.89%
- Results by county Phipps: 40–50% 50–60% 60–70% Adams: 40–50% 50–60% 60–70%
U.S. senator before election
Lawrence C. Phipps
Republican
Elected U.S. Senator
Lawrence C. Phipps
Republican

1924 United States Senate election in Colorado
Party	Candidate	Votes	%
Republican	Lawrence C. Phipps (incumbent)	159,698	50.19%
Democratic	Alva B. Adams (Incumbent (Note: Adams was the incumbent for Colorado's other Senate seat. He opted to run for this seat instead of running for election there.))	139,660	43.89%
Independent	Morton Alexander	16,039	5.04%
Independent	Elwood Hillis	1,575	0.50%
Independent	James Albert Ayres	1,197	0.38%
Majority		20,038	6.20%
Turnout		318,169	
Republican hold			

== Connecticut (special) ==
1924 United States Senate special election in Connecticut
- December 16, 1924
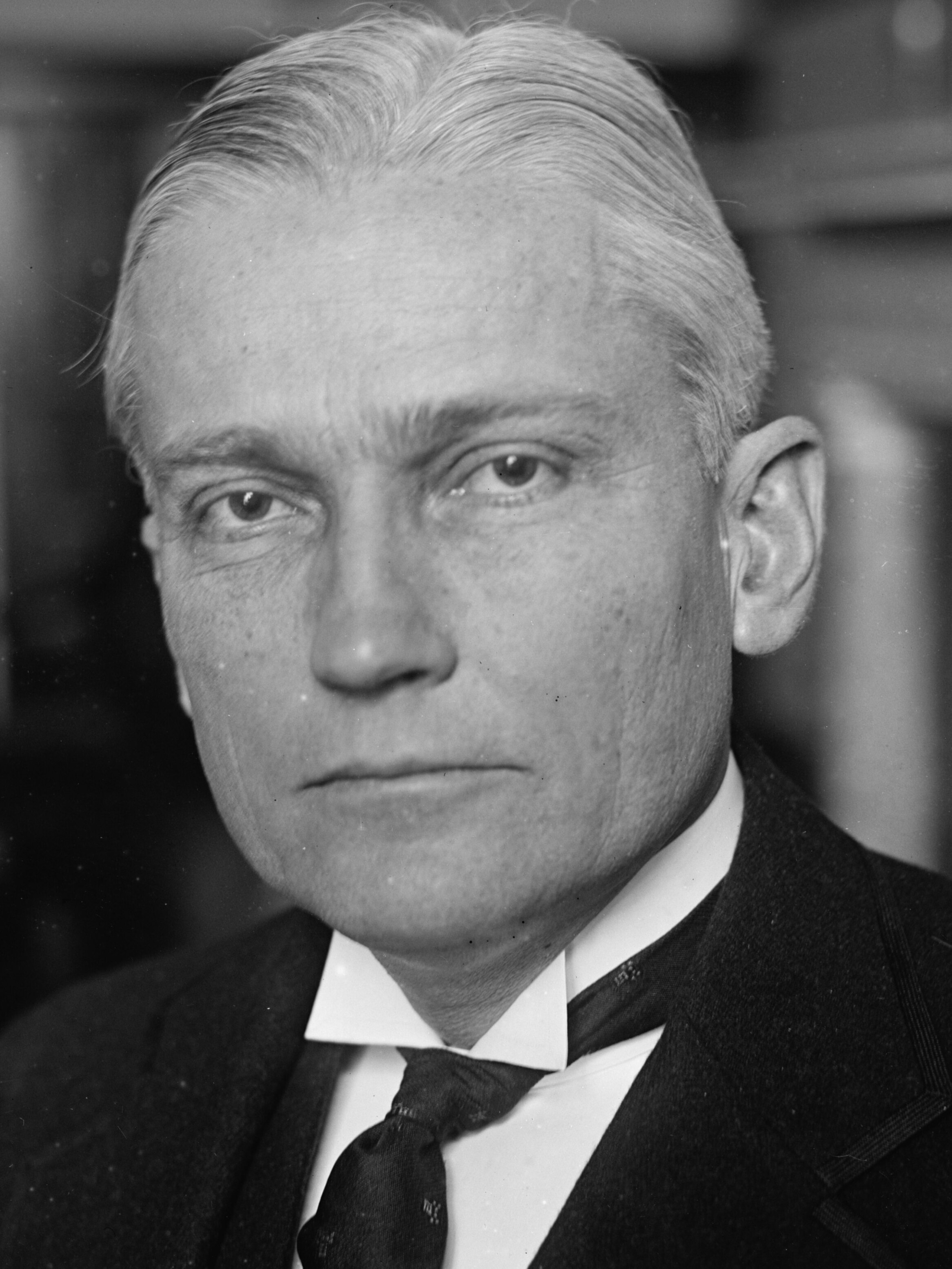

Nominee	Hiram Bingham III	Hamilton Holt
Party	Republican	Democratic
Popular vote	112,400	71,871
Percentage	60.35%	38.59%
- Bingham: 50–60% 60–70% 70–80% 80–90% 90–100% Holt: 40–50% 50–60% 60–70% Tie: 50%
U.S. senator before election
Frank B. Brandegee
Republican
Elected U.S. Senator
Hiram Bingham III
Republican

1924 United States Senate special election in Connecticut
Party	Candidate	Votes	%
Republican	Hiram Bingham III	112,400	60.35%
Democratic	Hamilton Holt	71,871	38.59%
Socialist	Martin Plunkett	1,961	1.05%
Majority		40,529	21.76%
Turnout		186,232	
Republican hold			

== Delaware ==
1924 United States Senate election in Delaware
Party	Candidate	Votes	%
Republican	T. Coleman du Pont	52,731	59.37%
Democratic	James M. Tunnell	36,085	40.63%
Majority		16,646	18.74%
Turnout		88,816	
Republican hold			

== Georgia ==
1924 U.S. Senate Democratic primary in Georgia
- September 10, 1924
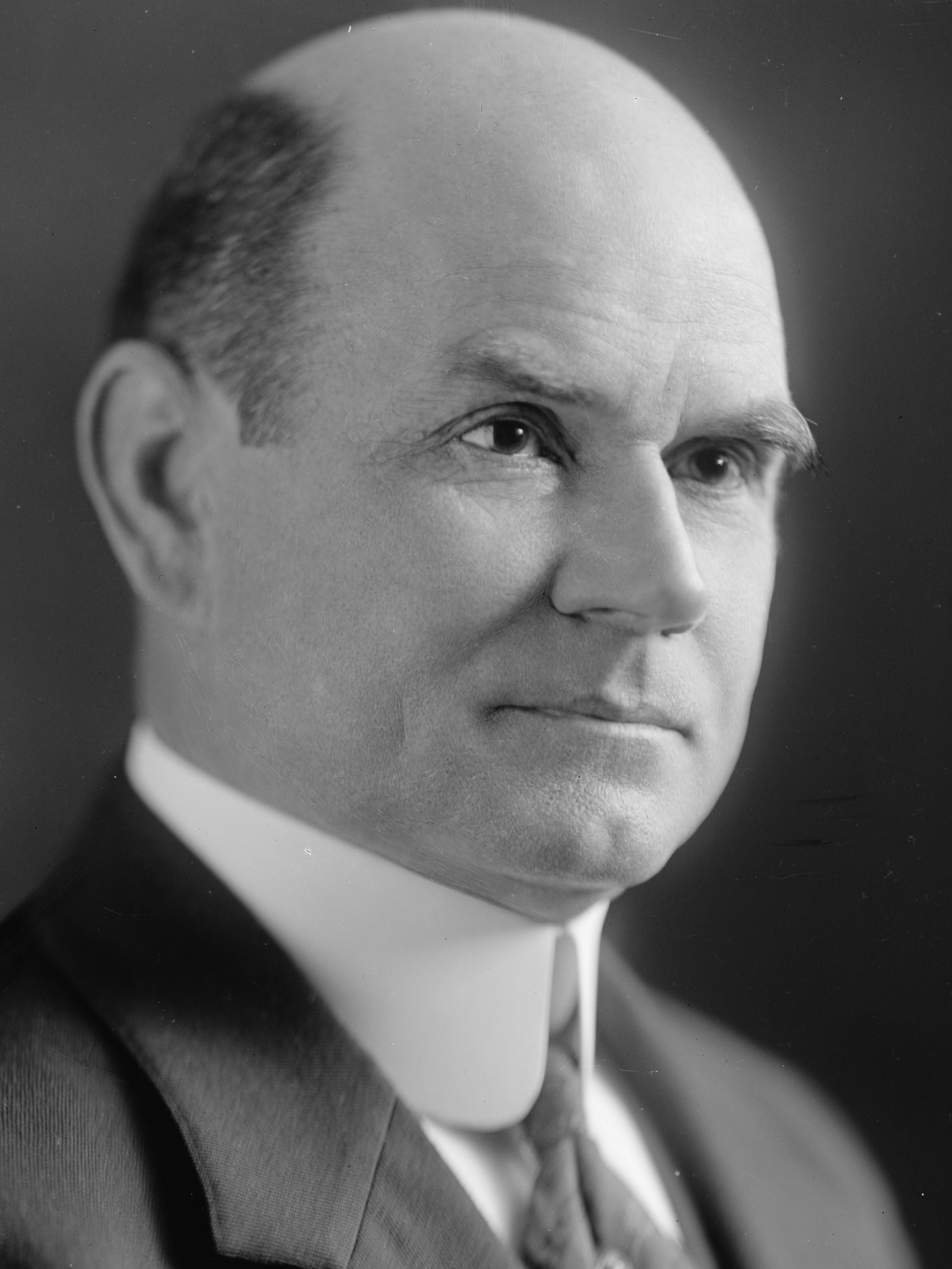

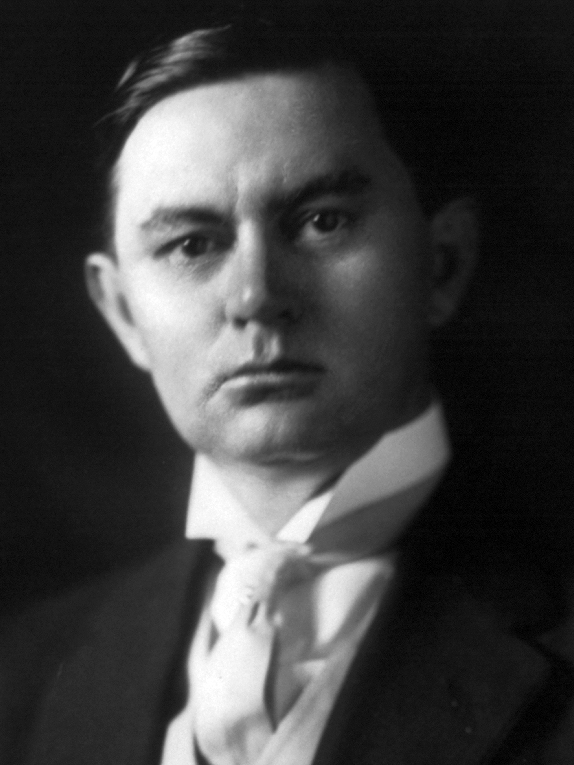
Nominee	William J. Harris	Thomas W. Hardwick
Party	Democratic	Democratic
Electoral vote	380	32
Popular vote	144,740	75,713
Percentage	65.66%	34.34%
U.S. senator before election
William J. Harris
Democratic
Elected U.S. Senator
William J. Harris
Democratic

Democratic primary, 10 September 1924
Candidate	Popular vote		County unit vote	
Candidate	Votes	%	Votes	%
William J. Harris	144,740	65.66	380	92.23
Thomas W. Hardwick	75,713	34.34	32	7.77
Total	220,453	100.00	412	100.00

1924 United States Senate election in Georgia
Party	Candidate	Votes	%
Democratic	William J. Harris (incumbent)	155,497	100.00%
Democratic hold			

== Idaho ==
1924 United States Senate election in Idaho
- November 4, 1924
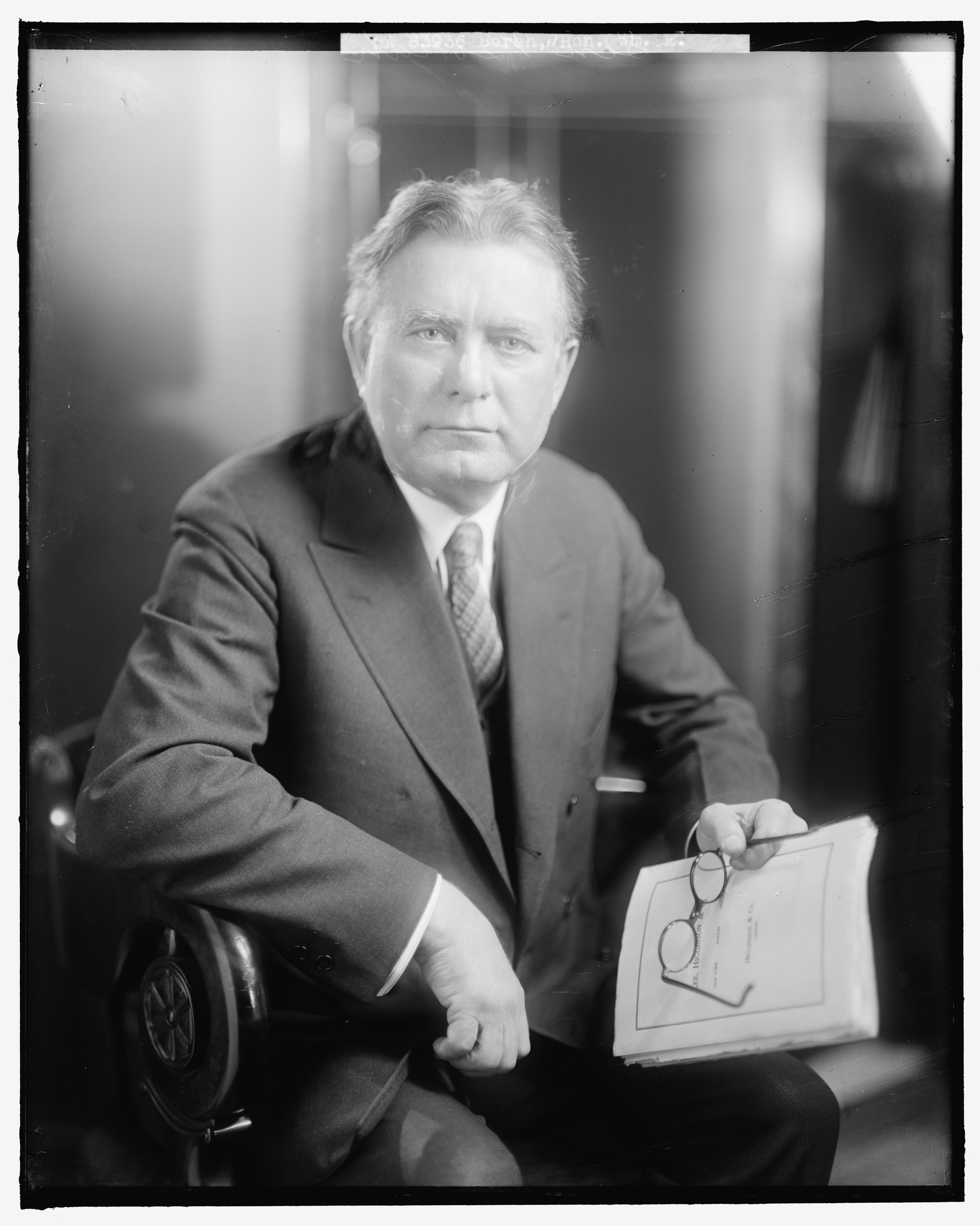
Nominee	William Borah	Frank Martin
Party	Republican	Democratic
Popular vote	99,846	25,199
Percentage	79.50%	20.06%
- County results Borah: 60–70% 70–80% 80–90% 90–100%
U.S. senator before election
William Borah
Republican
Elected U.S. Senator
William Borah
Republican

1924 United States Senate election in Idaho
Party	Candidate	Votes	%
Republican	William Borah (incumbent)	99,846	79.50%
Democratic	Frank Martin	25,199	20.06%
Socialist	Eugene F. Gary	554	0.44%
Majority		74,647	59.44%
Turnout		125,599	
Republican hold			

== Illinois ==
1924 United States Senate election in Illinois
- November 4, 1924
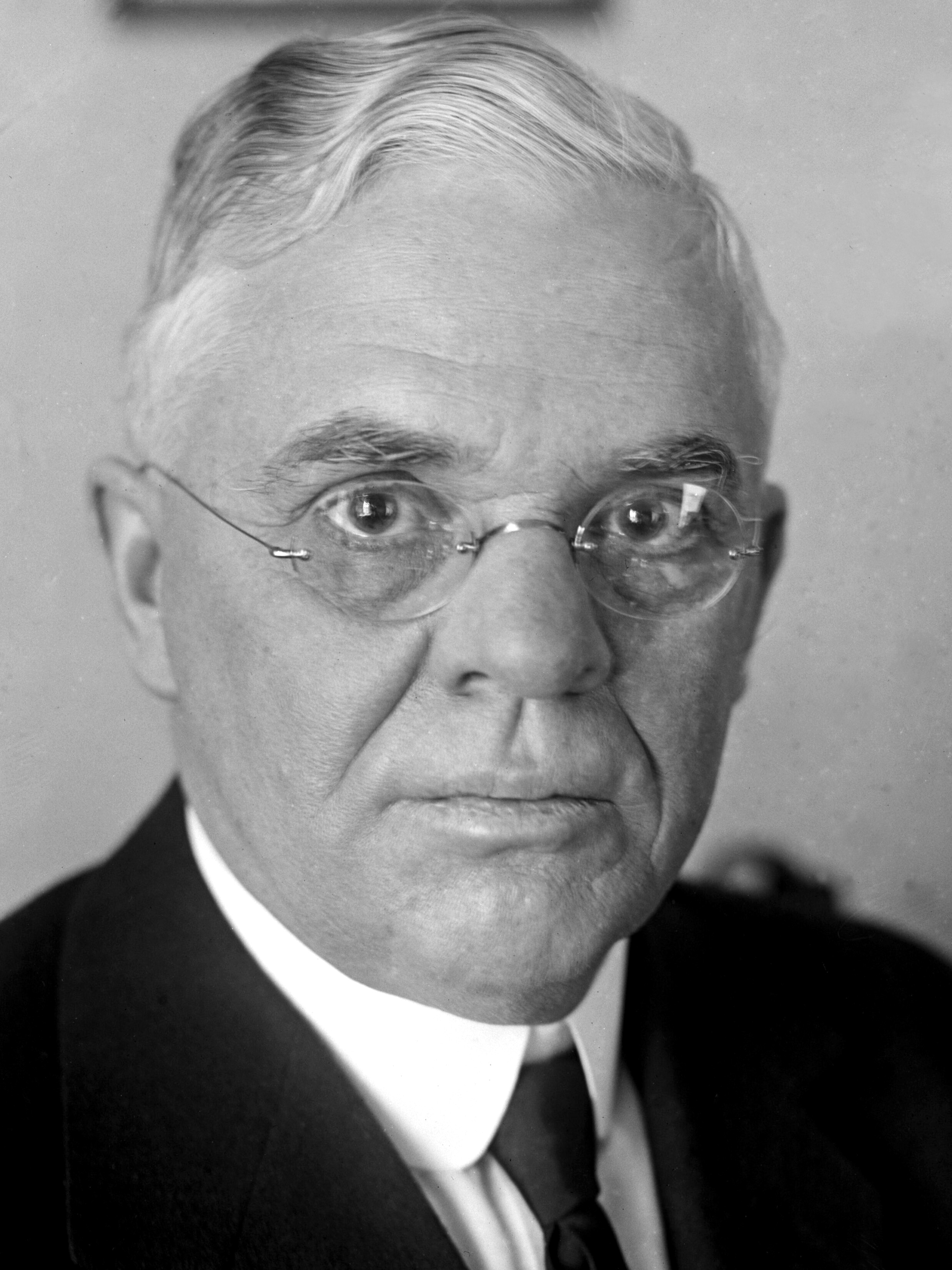

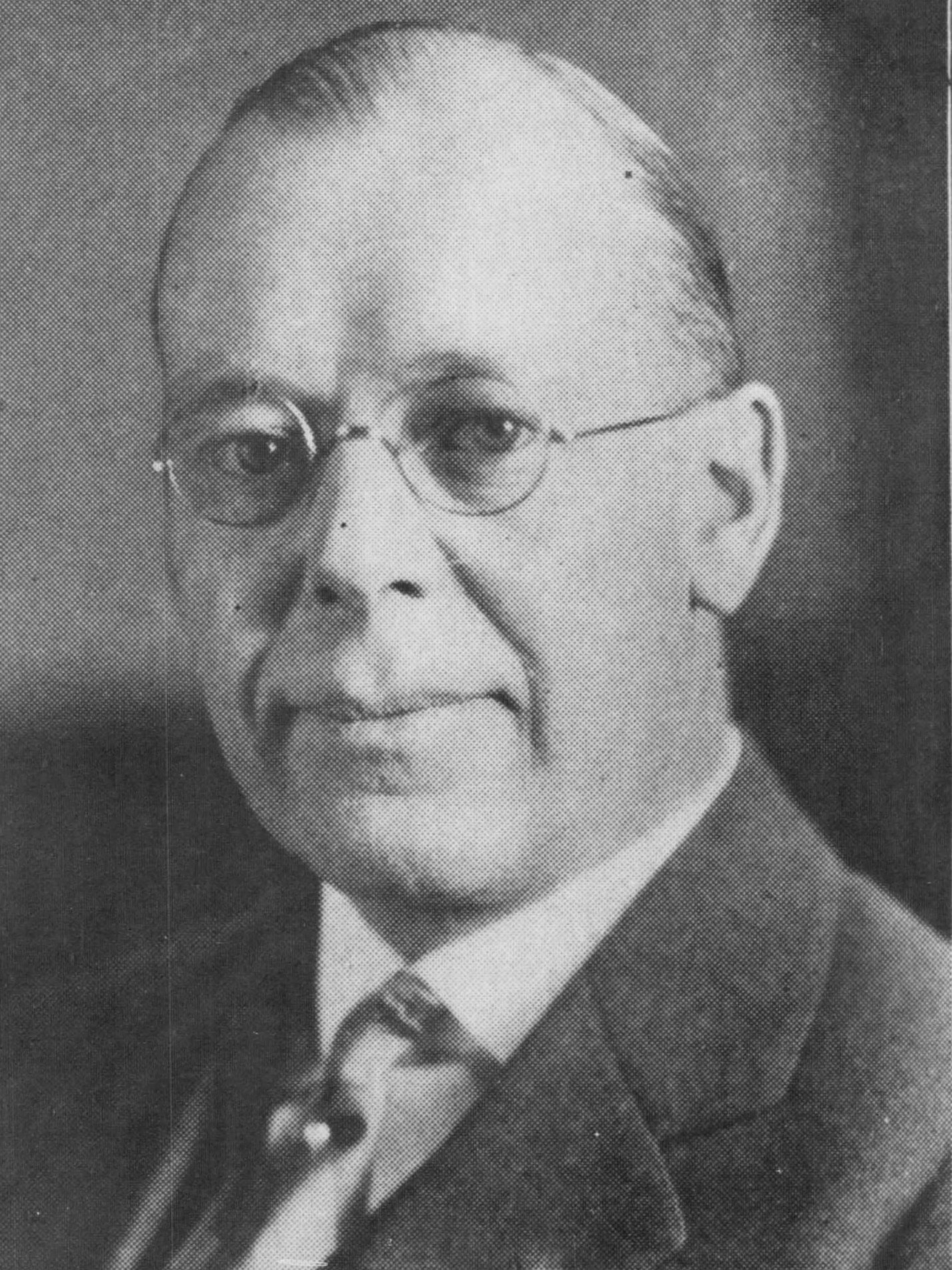
Nominee	Charles S. Deneen	Albert A. Sprague
Party	Republican	Democratic
Popular vote	1,449,180	806,702
Percentage	63.54%	35.37%
- County results Deneen: 40–50% 50–60% 60–70% 70–80% 80–90% Sprague: 50–60%
U.S. senator before election
Medill McCormick
Republican
Elected U.S. senator
Charles S. Deneen
Republican

1924 United States Senate election in Illinois
Party	Candidate	Votes	%
Republican	Charles S. Deneen	1,449,180	63.54%
Democratic	Albert A. Sprague	806,702	35.37%
Socialist	George Koop	18,708	0.82%
Socialist Labor	Albert Wirth	2,966	0.13%
Workers	J. Louis Engdahl	2,518	0.11%
Commonwealth Land	Lewis D. Spaulding	391	0.02%
Independent	Parke Longworth	382	0.02%
Majority		642,478	28.17%
Turnout		2,280,847	
Republican hold			

== Iowa ==
1924 United States Senate election in Iowa
- November 4, 1924
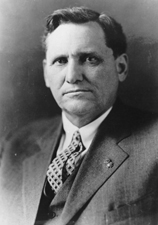

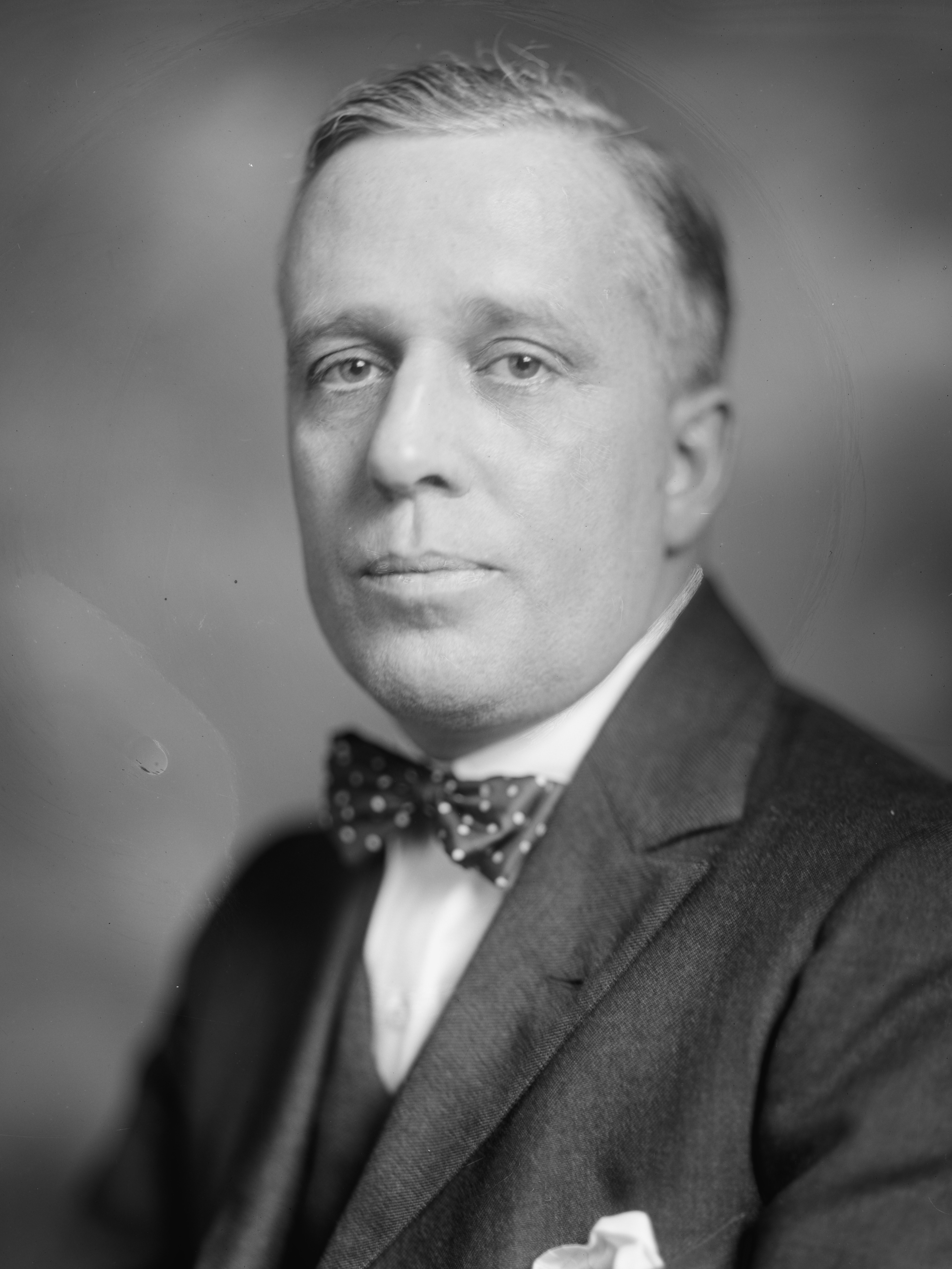
Nominee	Smith W. Brookhart	Daniel F. Steck
Party	Republican	Democratic
Alliance	Progressive Party (United States, 1924–34)
Popular vote	447,706	446,951
Percentage	49.95%	49.87%
- Brookhart: 50–60% 60–70% 70–80% Steck: 50–60% 60–70%
U.S. senator before election
Smith W. Brookhart
Republican
Elected U.S. Senator
Smith W. Brookhart*
Republican

1924 United States Senate election in Iowa
Party	Candidate	Votes	%
Republican	Smith W. Brookhart (incumbent)	447,706	49.95%
Democratic	Daniel F. Steck	446,951	49.83%
Independent Republican	Luther Brewer	1,124	0.13%
Independent	L. E. Eickelberg	535	0.06%
None	Scattering	31	0.00%
Majority		755	0.09%
Turnout		896,347	
Republican hold			

Democrat Daniel F. Steck successfully challenged the election, and the Senate awarded Steck the seat on April 12, 1926.

== Kansas ==
1924 United States Senate election in Kansas
- November 4, 1924
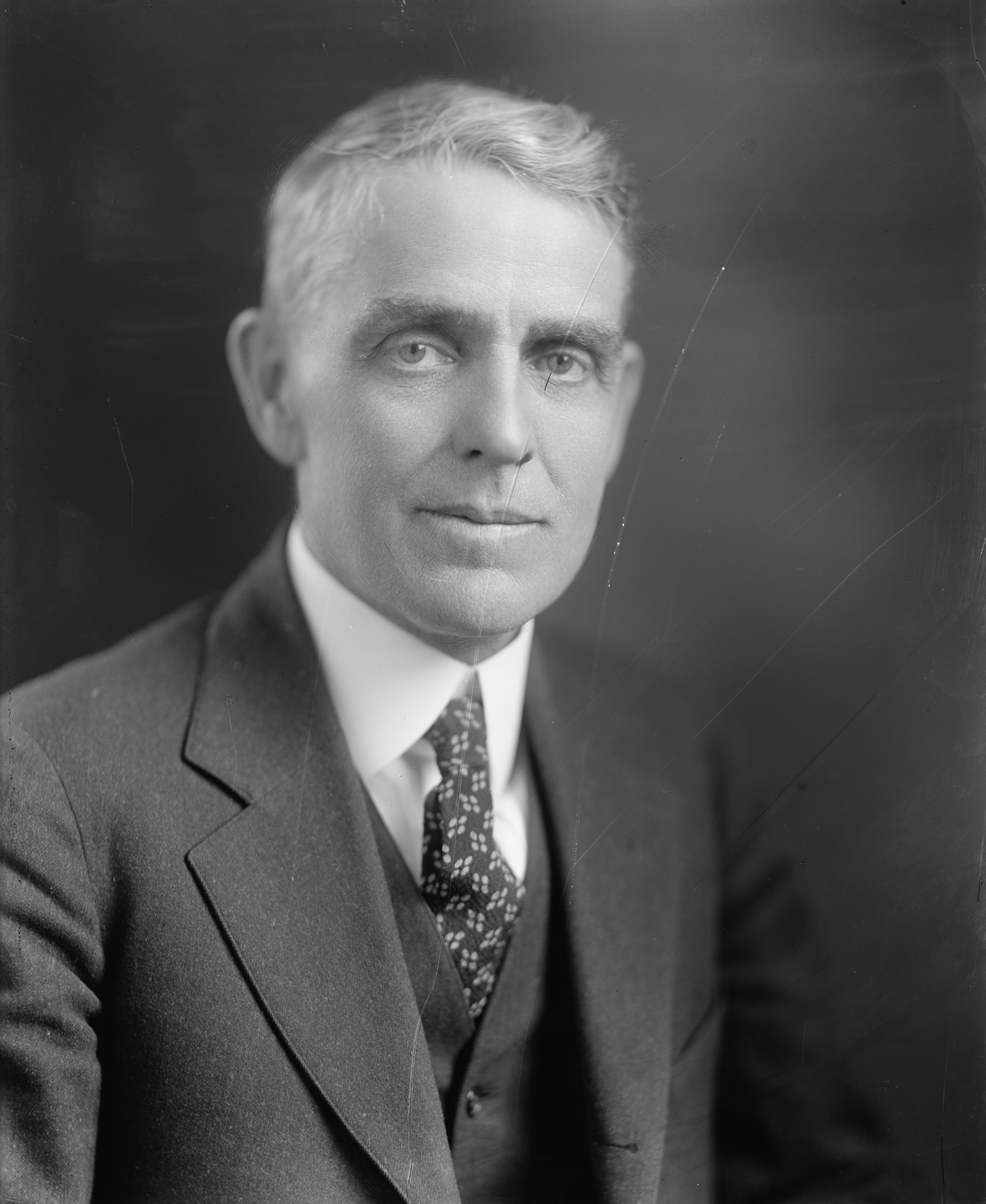
Nominee	Arthur Capper	James Malone
Party	Republican	Democratic
Popular vote	428,494	154,189
Percentage	70.10%	25.22%
- County results Capper: 50–60% 60–70% 70–80% 80–90% Davis: 50–60%
U.S. senator before election
Arthur Capper
Republican
Elected U.S. Senator
Arthur Capper
Republican

1924 United States Senate election in Kansas
Party	Candidate	Votes	%
Republican	Arthur Capper (incumbent)	428,494	70.10%
Democratic	James Malone	154,189	25.22%
Independent	Fred J. Farley	23,266	3.81%
Socialist	S. O. Coble	5,340	0.87%
Majority		274,305	44.88%
Turnout		611,289	
Republican hold			

== Kentucky ==
1924 United States Senate election in Kentucky
- November 4, 1924
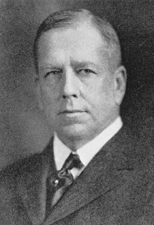

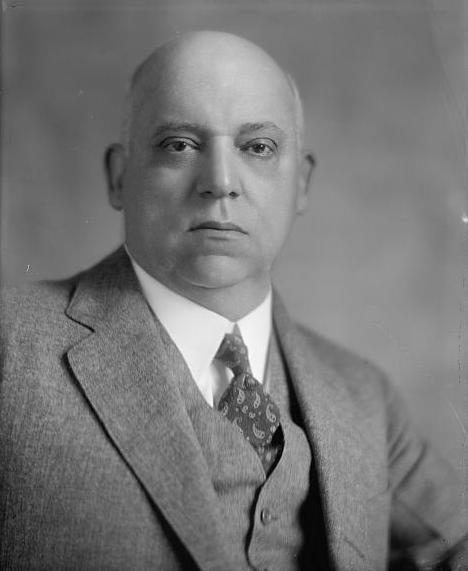
Nominee	Frederic M. Sackett	Augustus Owsley Stanley
Party	Republican	Democratic
Popular vote	406,121	381,605
Percentage	51.56%	48.44%
- County results Sackett: 50–60% 60–70% 70–80% 80–90% >90% Stanley: 50–60% 60–70% 70–80% 80–90%
U.S. senator before election
Augustus Owsley Stanley
Democratic
Elected U.S. Senator
Frederic M. Sackett
Democratic

1924 United States Senate election in Kentucky
Party	Candidate	Votes	%
Republican	Frederic M. Sackett	406,121	51.56%
Democratic	Augustus Owsley Stanley (incumbent)	381,605	48.44%
Majority		24,516	3.12%
Turnout		787,726	
Republican gain from Democratic			

== Louisiana ==
1924 United States Senate election in Louisiana
Party	Candidate	Votes	%
Democratic	Joseph E. Ransdell (incumbent)	94,934	100.00%
Democratic hold			

== Maine ==
1924 United States Senate election in Maine
- September 8, 1924
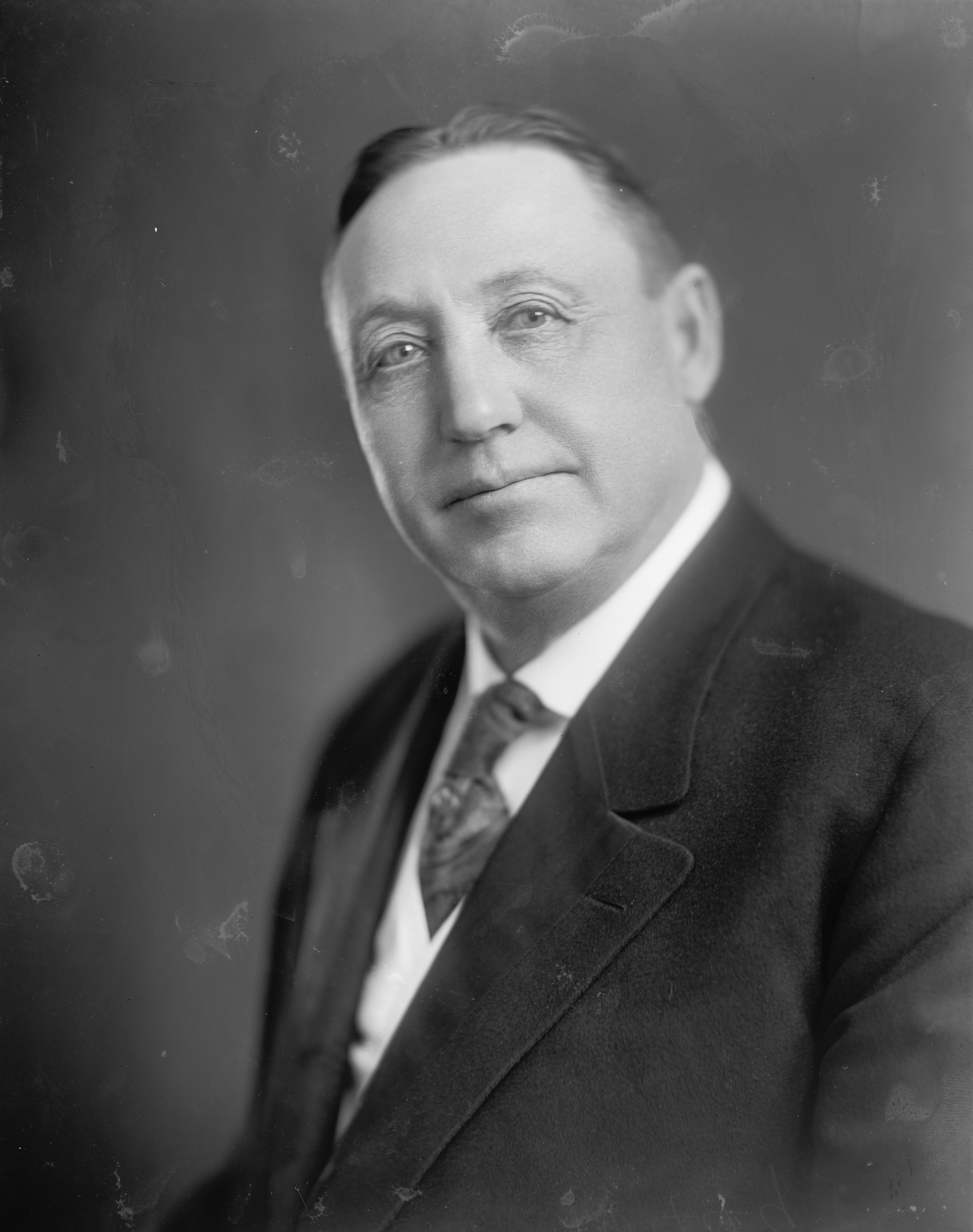

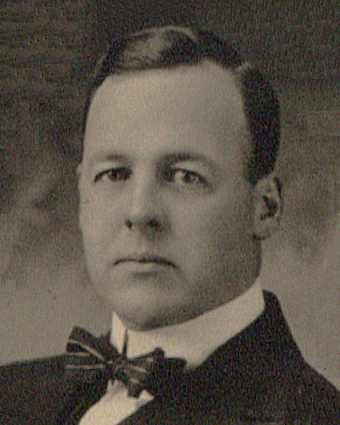
Nominee	Bert Fernald	Fulton J. Redman
Party	Republican	Democratic
Popular vote	148,783	97,428
Percentage	60.43%	39.57%
- County results Fernald: 50–60% 60–70%
U.S. senator before election
Bert Fernald
Republican
Elected U.S. Senator
Bert Fernald
Republican

1924 United States Senate election in Maine
Party	Candidate	Votes	%
Republican	Bert M. Fernald (incumbent)	148,783	60.43%
Democratic	Fulton J. Redman	97,428	39.57%
Majority		51,355	20.86%
Turnout		246,211	
Republican hold			

== Massachusetts ==
1924 United States Senate election in Massachusetts
- November 4, 1924
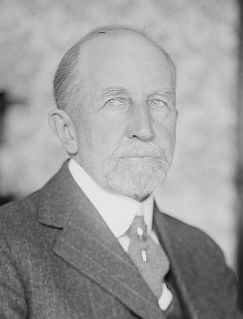

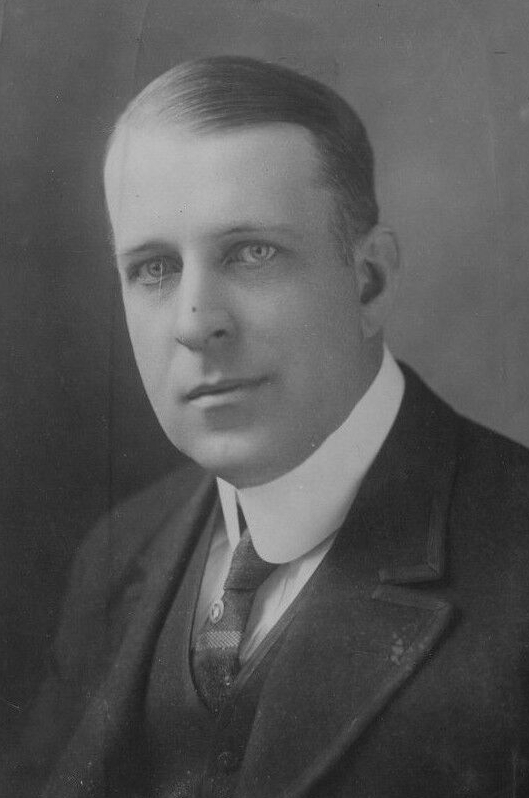
Nominee	Frederick H. Gillett	David I. Walsh
Party	Republican	Democratic
Popular vote	566,188	547,600
Percentage	50.26%	48.61%
- Gillett: 40–50% 50–60% 60–70% 70–80% 80–90% 90–100% Walsh: 40–50% 50–60% 60–70% 70–80%
Senator before election
David I. Walsh
Democratic
Elected Senator
Frederick H. Gillett
Republican

1924 United States Senate election in Massachusetts
Party	Candidate	Votes	%
Republican	Frederick H. Gillett	566,188	50.26%
Democratic	David I. Walsh (incumbent)	547,600	48.61%
Workers	Antoinette Konikow	12,716	1.13%
None	All others	22	0.00%
Majority		18588	1.65%
Turnout		1126526	
Republican gain from Democratic			

== Michigan ==
=== Michigan (special) ===
1924 United States Senate special election in Michigan
Party	Candidate	Votes	%
Republican	James J. Couzens (incumbent)	839,569	75.04%
Democratic	Mortimer E. Cooley	266,851	23.85%
Prohibition	Frank E. Titus	7,452	0.67%
Socialist Labor	Logan M. Cunningham	3,360	0.30%
Socialist	Albert L. Day	1,555	0.14%
None	Scattering	16	0.00%
Majority		572,718	51.19%
Turnout		1,118,803	
Republican hold			

=== Michigan (regular) ===
1924 United States Senate election in Michigan
- November 4, 1924
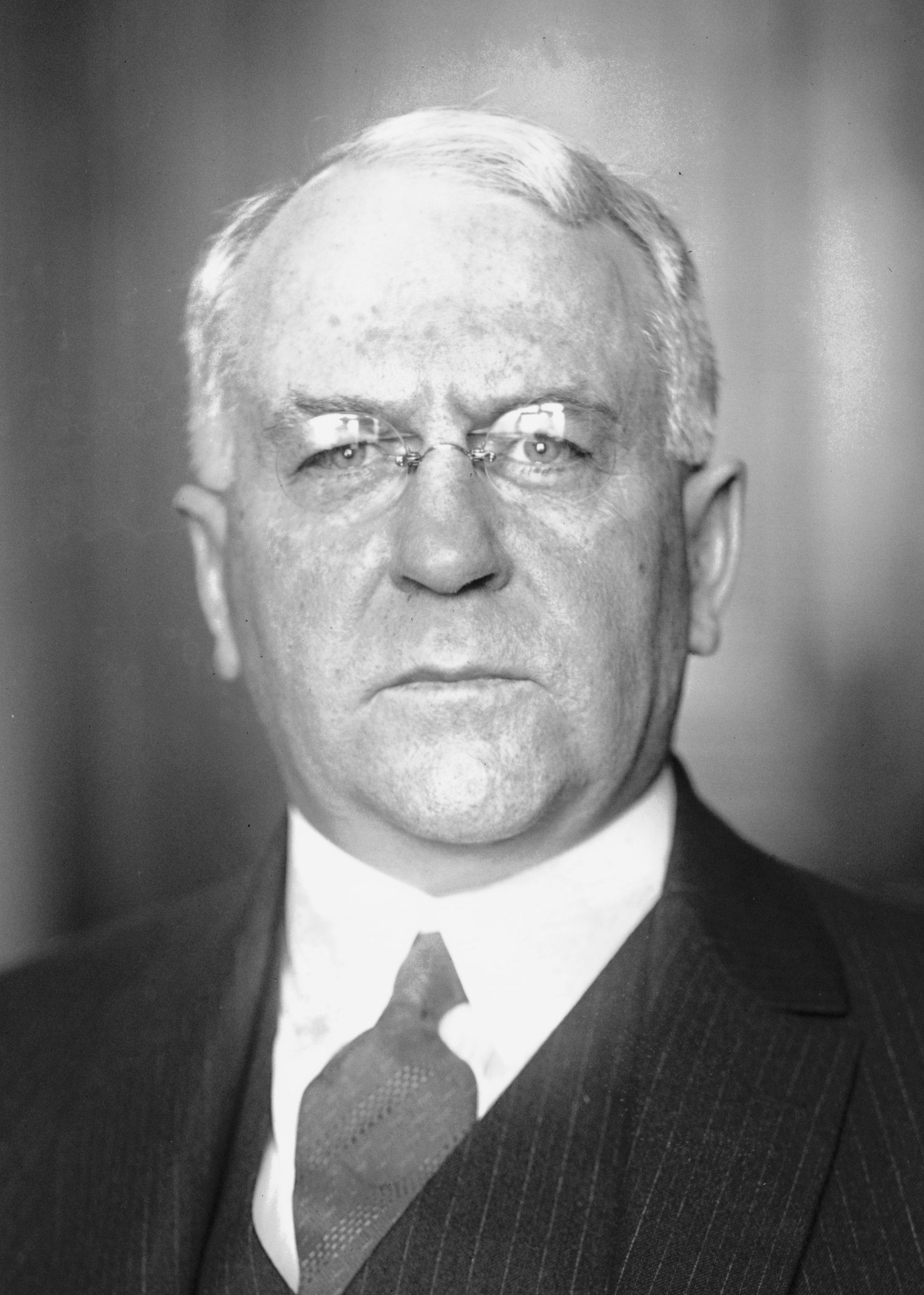

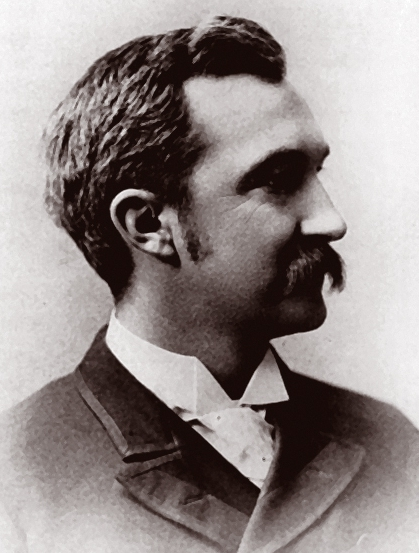
Nominee	James J. Couzens	Mortimer Cooley
Party	Republican	Democratic
Popular vote	858,934	284,609
Percentage	74.27%	24.61%
- County results Couzens: 50–60% 60–70% 70–80% 80–90% 90–100%
U.S. senator before election
James J. Couzens
Republican
Elected U.S. Senator
James J. Couzens
Republican

Michigan general election
Party	Candidate	Votes	%
Republican	James J. Couzens (incumbent)	858,934	74.26%
Democratic	Thomas A. E. Weadock	284,609	24.60%
Prohibition	Frank E. Titus	8,330	0.72%
Socialist Labor	Logan M. Cunningham	3,080	0.27%
Socialist	Albert L. Day	1,619	0.14%
None	Scattering	154	0.01%
Majority		574,325	49.66%
Turnout		1,156,726	
Republican hold			

== Minnesota ==
1924 United States Senate election in Minnesota
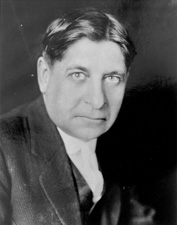

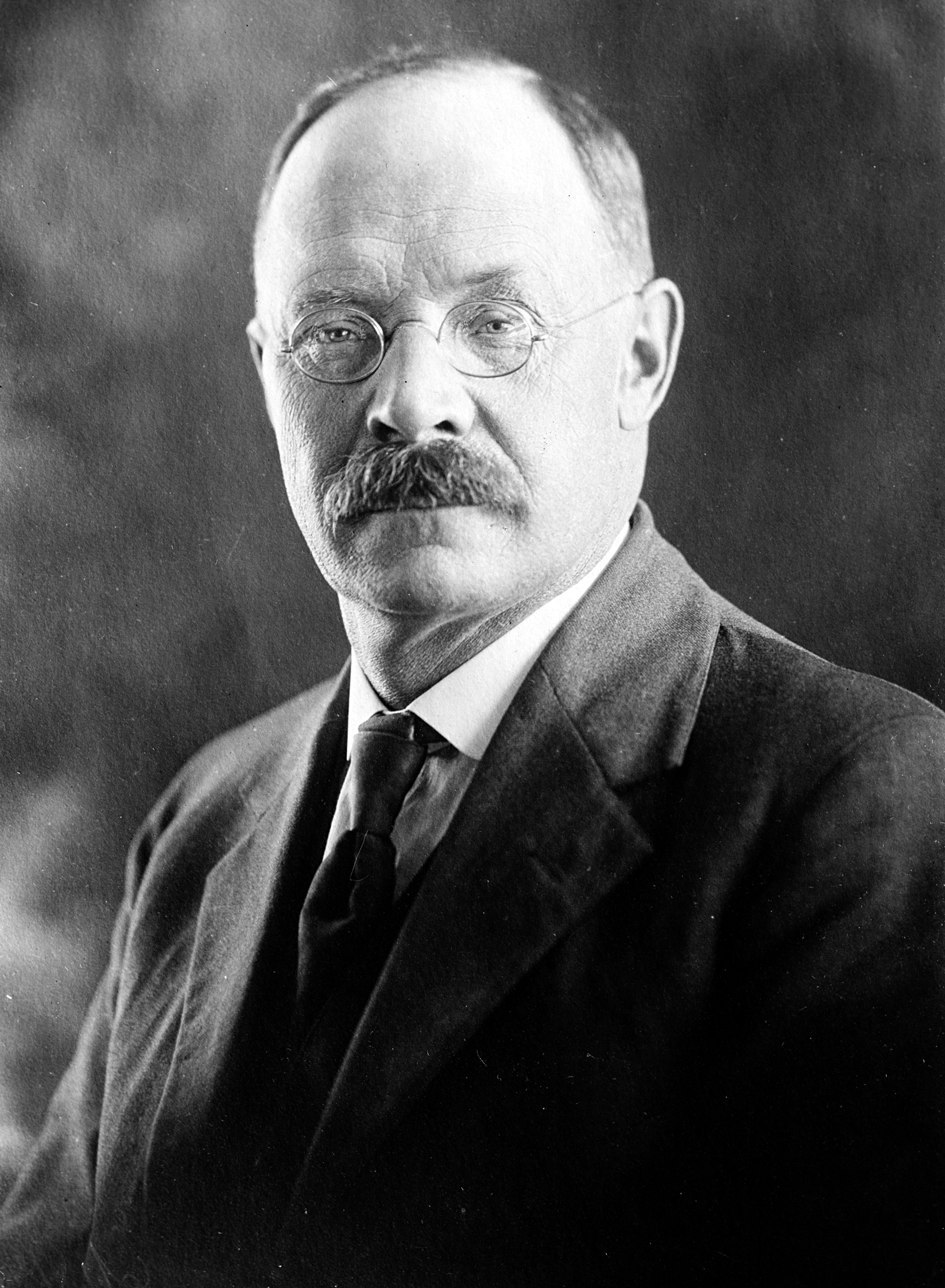

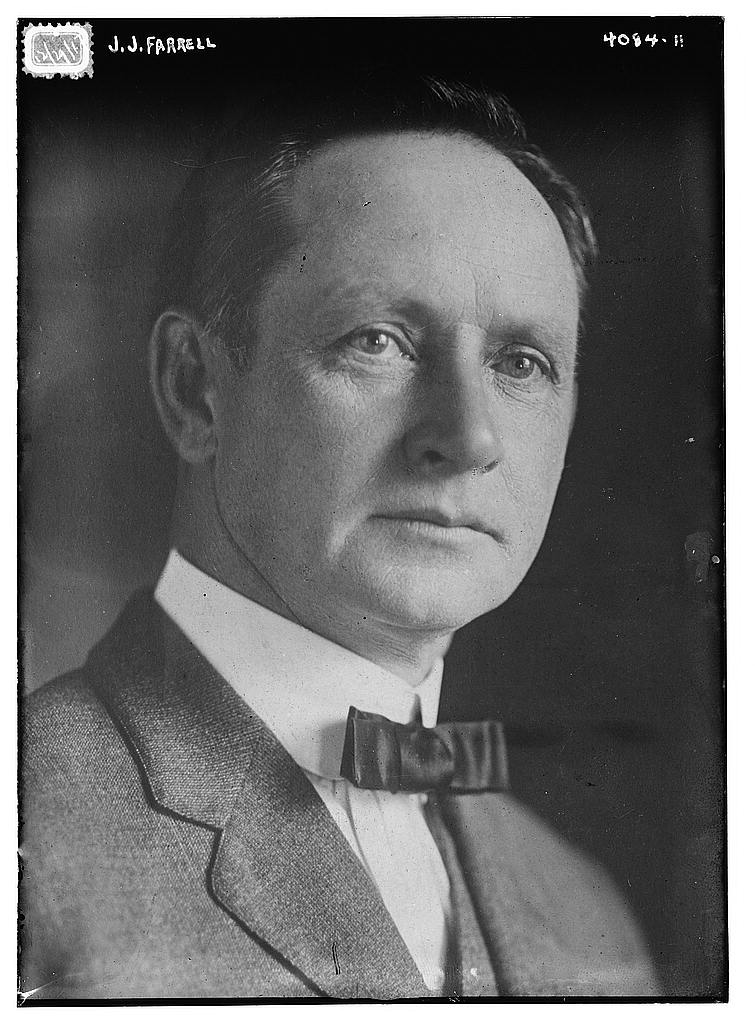
Nominee	Thomas D. Schall	Magnus Johnson	John J. Farrell
Party	Republican	Farmer–Labor	Democratic
Popular vote	388,594	380,646	53,709
Percentage	46.45%	45.50%	6.42%
- County results Schall: 40–50% 50–60% 60–70% Johnson: 40–50% 50–60% 60–70%
U.S. senator before election
Magnus Johnson
Farmer–Labor
Elected U.S. Senator
Thomas D. Schall
Republican

1924 United States Senate election in Minnesota
Party	Candidate	Votes	%
Republican	Thomas D. Schall	388,594	46.45%
Farmer–Labor	Magnus Johnson (incumbent)	380,646	45.50%
Democratic	John J. Farrell	53,709	6.42%
Beer-Wine Independent	Merle Birmingham	8,620	1.03%
Independent	Thomas Keefe	4,994	0.60%
Majority		7,948	0.95%
Turnout		836,563	
Republican gain from Farmer–Labor			

== Mississippi ==
1924 United States Senate election in Mississippi
Party	Candidate	Votes	%
Democratic	Pat Harrison (incumbent)	97,243	100.00%
Democratic hold			

== Montana ==
1924 United States Senate election in Montana
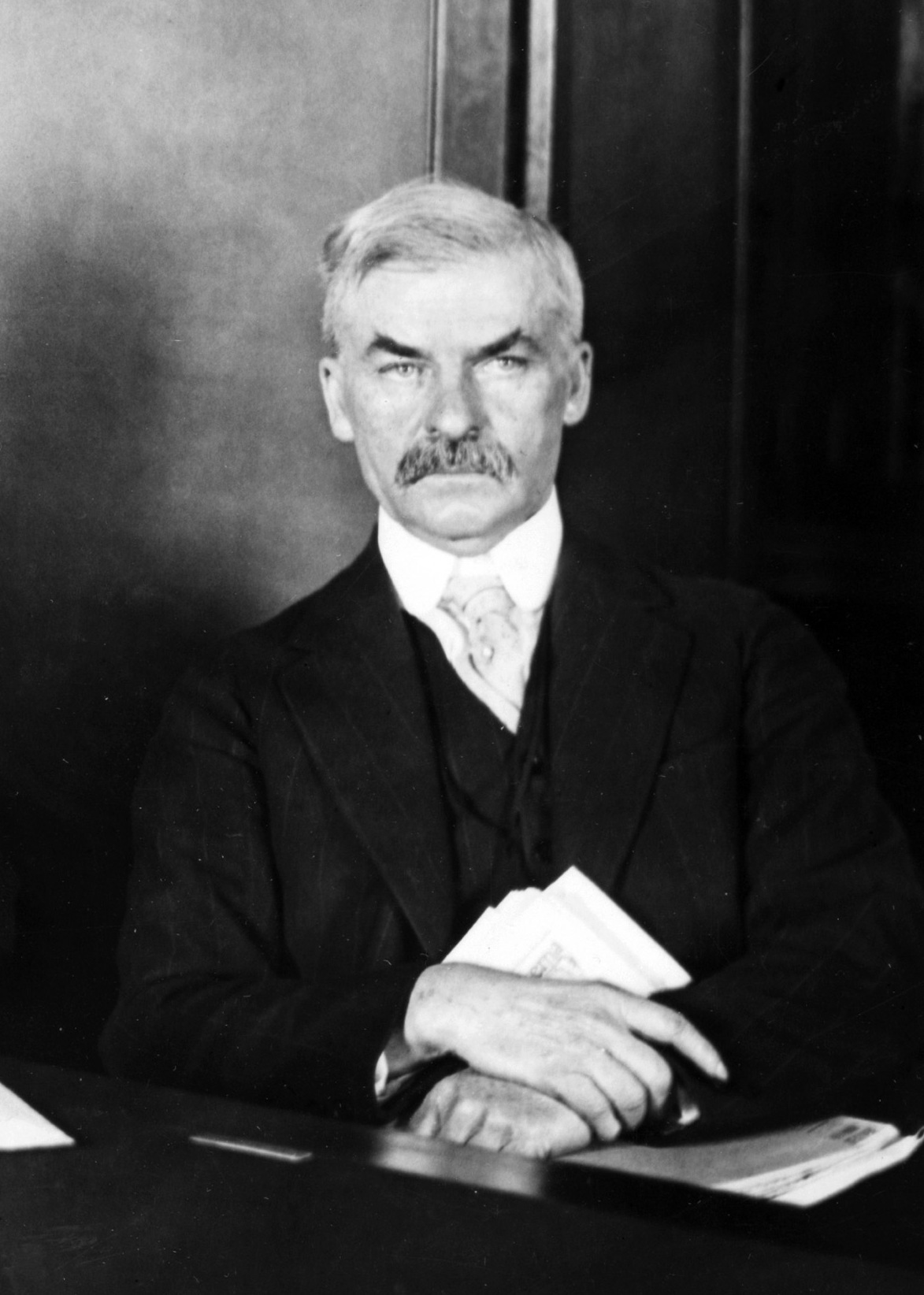

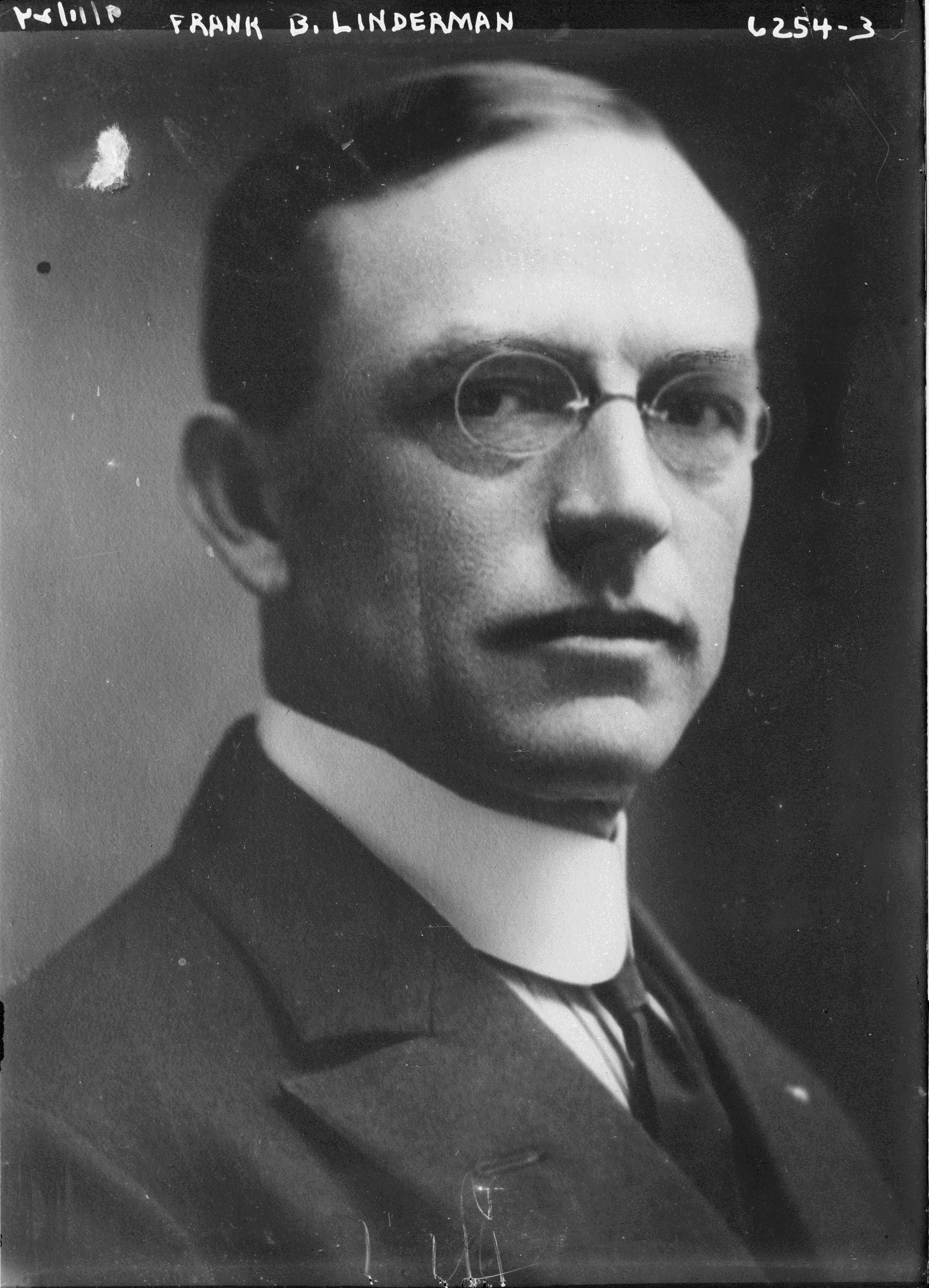
Nominee	Thomas J. Walsh	Frank Bird Linderman
Party	Democratic	Republican
Popular vote	89,681	72,000
Percentage	52.81%	42.40%
- County results Walsh: 40–50% 50–60% 60–70% Linderman: 40–50% 50–60% Anderson: 50–60%
U.S. senator before election
Thomas J. Walsh
Democratic
Elected U.S. Senator
Thomas J. Walsh
Democratic

Incumbent Democrat Thomas J. Walsh, who was first elected to the Senate in 1912 by the state legislature (as was the practice then), and re-elected in 1918 by popular vote (in accordance with the 17th Amendment), ran for re-election. He was unopposed in the Democratic primary.

He faced former State Representative Frank Bird Linderman and several other opponents in the general election. Walsh ultimately won re-election to his third term by a solid margin.

1924 United States Senate election in Montana
Party	Candidate	Votes	%
Democratic	Thomas J. Walsh (incumbent)	89,681	52.81%
Republican	Frank B. Linderman	72,000	42.40%
Farmer–Labor	J. W. Anderson	7,370	4.34%
Socialist	Charles F. Juttner	522	0.31%
Independent	Sam W. Teagarden	248	0.15%
Majority		17,681	10.41%
Turnout		169,821	
Democratic hold			

== Nebraska ==
1924 United States Senate election in Nebraska
- November 4, 1924
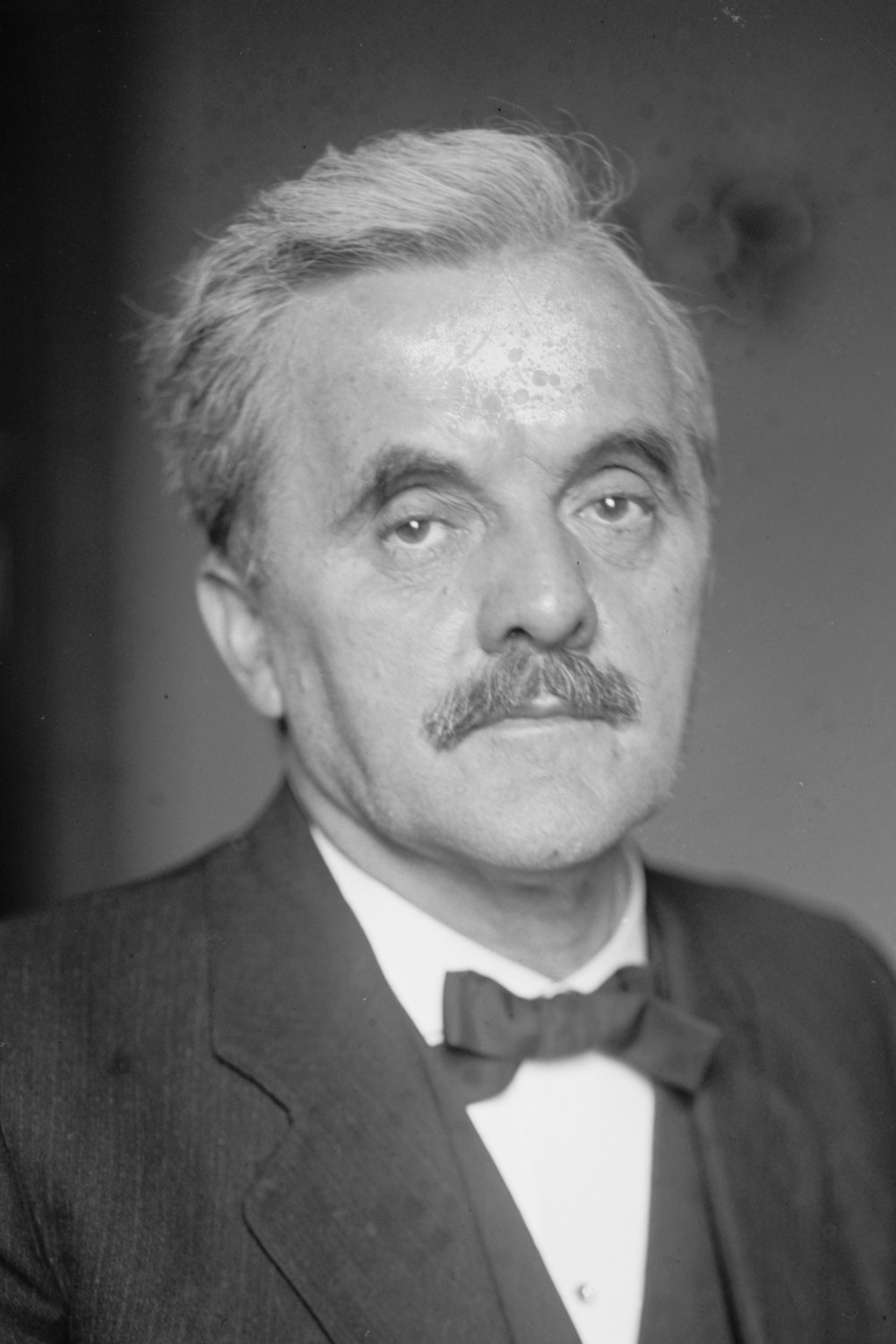

Nominee	George W. Norris	John J. Thomas
Party	Republican	Democratic
Popular vote	274,647	164,370
Percentage	62.56%	37.44%
- County results Norris: 50–60% 60–70% 70–80% Thomas: 50–60%
U.S. senator before election
George W. Norris
Republican
Elected U.S. Senator
George W. Norris
Republican

1924 United States Senate election in Nebraska
Party	Candidate	Votes	%
Republican	George W. Norris (incumbent)	274,647	62.56%
Democratic	J. J. Thomas	164,370	37.44%
N/A	Scattering	14	<0.01%
Majority		110,277	25.12%
Turnout		439,031	
Republican hold			

== New Hampshire ==
1924 United States Senate election in New Hampshire
- November 4, 1924
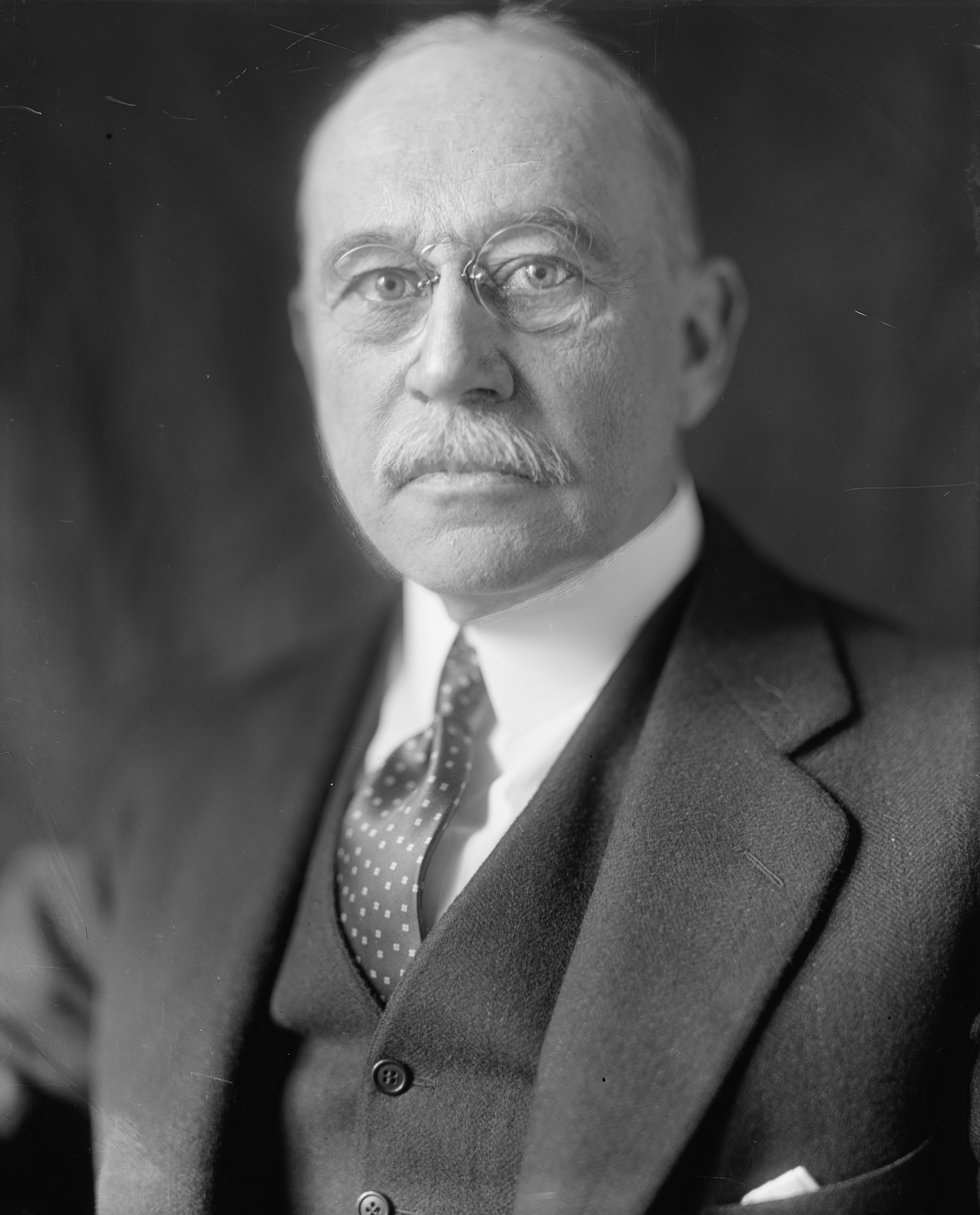

Nominee	Henry W. Keyes	George Farrand
Party	Republican	Democratic
Popular vote	94,432	63,596
Percentage	59.76%	40.24%
- Keyes: 50–60% 60–70% 70–80% 80–90% 90-100% Farrand: 50–60% 60–70% 70–80%
U.S. senator before election
Henry W. Keyes
Republican
Elected U.S. Senator
Henry W. Keyes
Republican

1924 United States Senate election in New Hampshire
Party	Candidate	Votes	%
Republican	Henry W. Keyes (incumbent)	94,432	59.76%
Democratic	George E. Farrand	63,596	40.24%
Majority		30,836	19.52%
Turnout		158,028	
Republican hold			

== New Jersey ==
1924 United States Senate election in New Jersey
- November 4, 1924
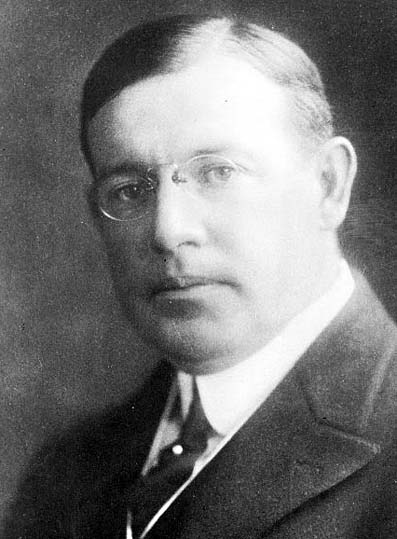

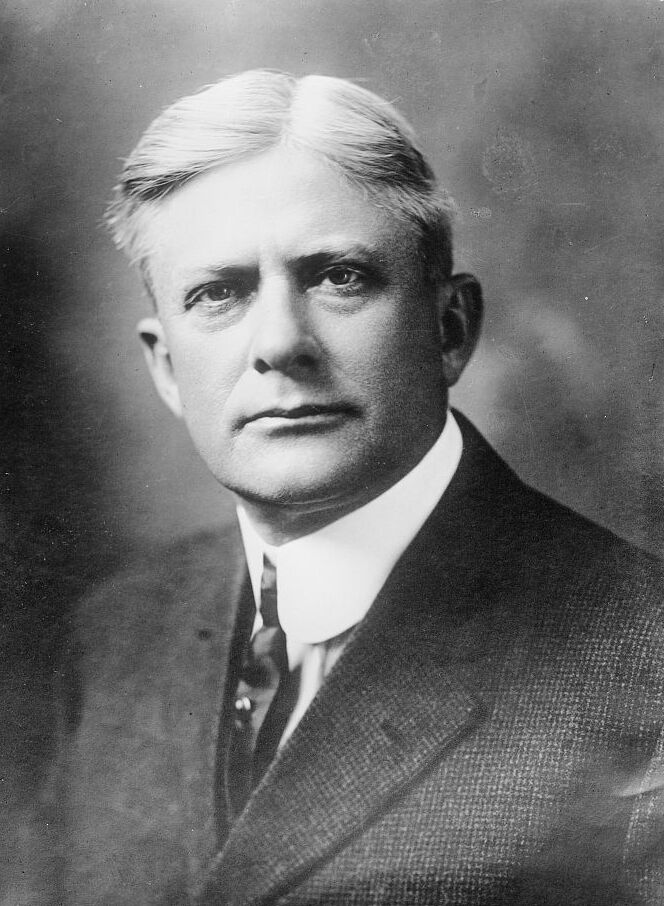
Nominee	Walter Evans Edge	Frederick W. Donnelly
Party	Republican	Democratic
Popular vote	608,020	331,034
Percentage	61.84%	33.67%
- Results by county Edge: 50–60% 60–70% 70–80% Donnelly: 50–60%
Senator before election
Walter Evans Edge
Republican
Elected Senator
Walter Evans Edge
Republican

1924 United States Senate election in New Jersey
Party	Candidate	Votes	%
Republican	Walter Evans Edge (incumbent)	608,020	61.84%
Democratic	Frederick W. Donnelly	331,034	33.67%
Progressive Party (US, 1924)	George L. Record	37,795	3.84%
Prohibition	Grafton E. Day	3,961	0.40%
Workers	Rudolf Vollgraf	1,127	0.11%
Socialist Labor	John C. Butterworth	1,000	0.10%
Commonwealth Land	Herman G. Loew	238	0.02%
Majority		276,986	28.17%
Turnout		983,175	
Republican hold			

== New Mexico ==
1924 United States Senate election in New Mexico
- November 4, 1924
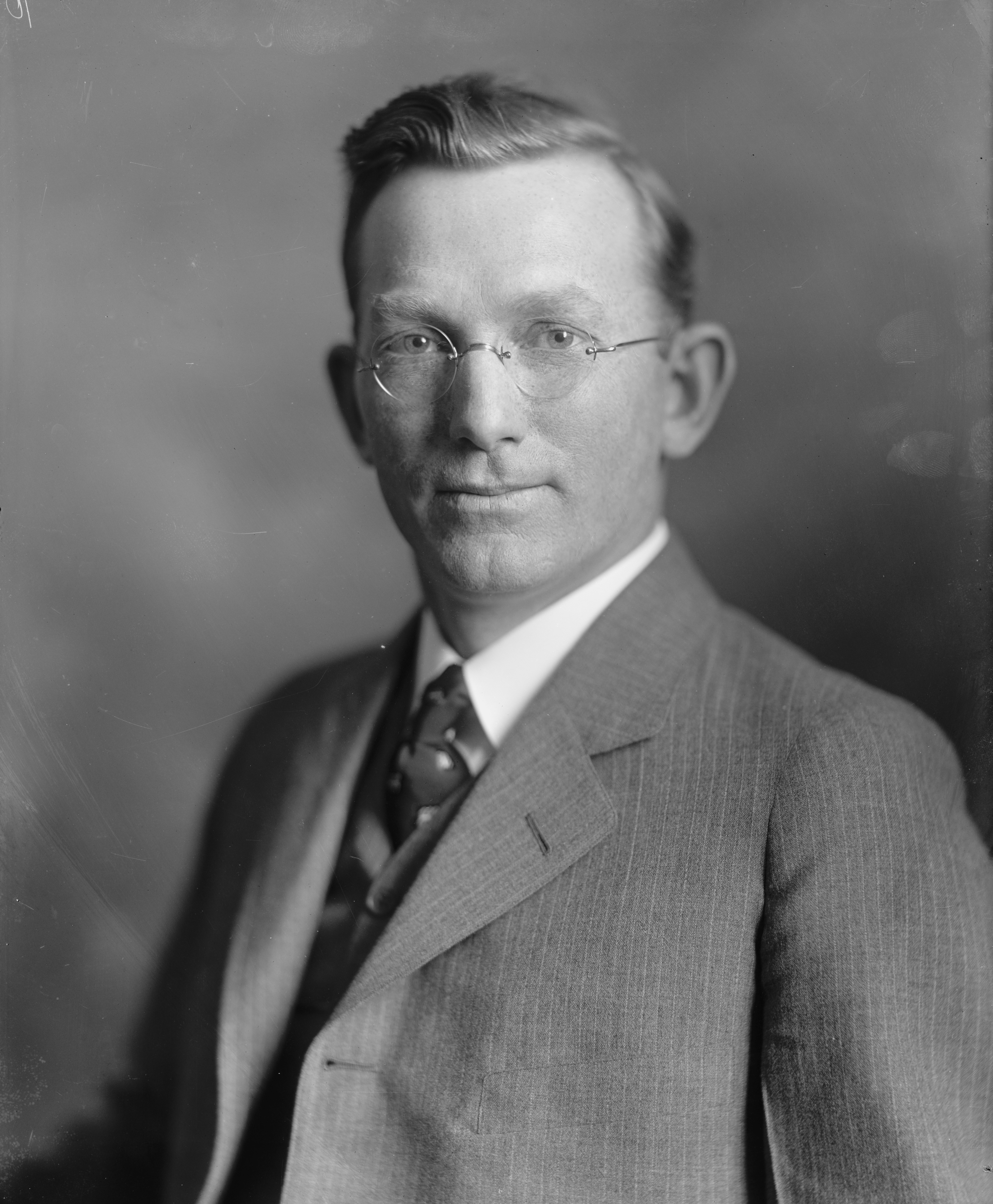

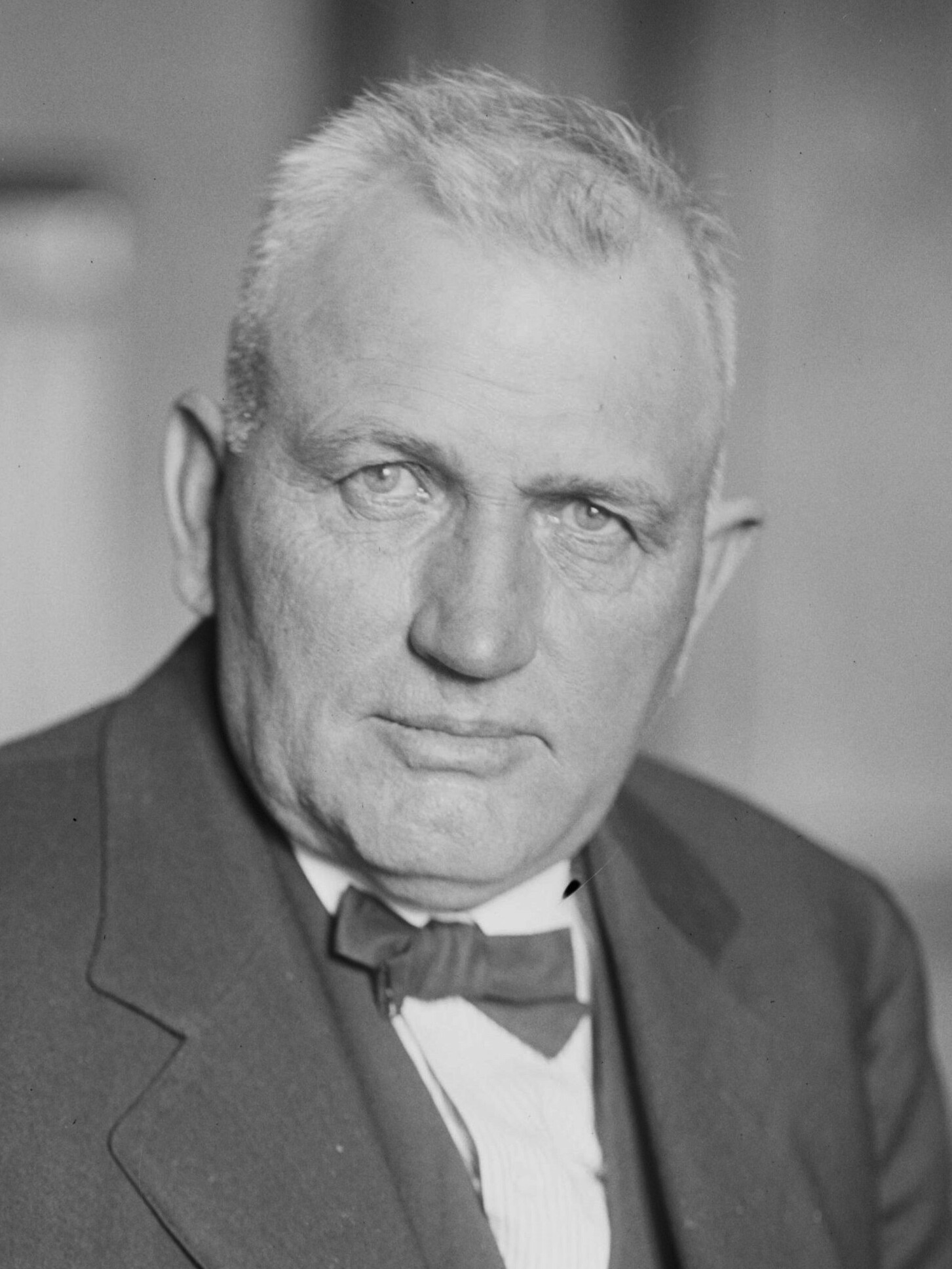
Nominee	Sam G. Bratton	Holm O. Bursum
Party	Democratic	Republican
Popular vote	57,355	54,558
Percentage	51.25%	48.75%
- County results Bratton: 40–50% 50–60% 60–70% 80–90% Bursum: 40–50% 50–60% 60–70% 70–80%
U.S. senator before election
Holm O. Bursum
Republican
Elected U.S. Senator
Sam G. Bratton
Democratic

1924 United States Senate election in New Mexico
Party	Candidate	Votes	%
Democratic	Sam G. Bratton	57,355	51.25%
Republican	Holm O. Bursum (incumbent)	54,558	48.75%
Majority		2,797	2.50%
Turnout		111,913	
Democratic gain from Republican			

== North Carolina ==
1924 United States Senate election in North Carolina
- November 4, 1924
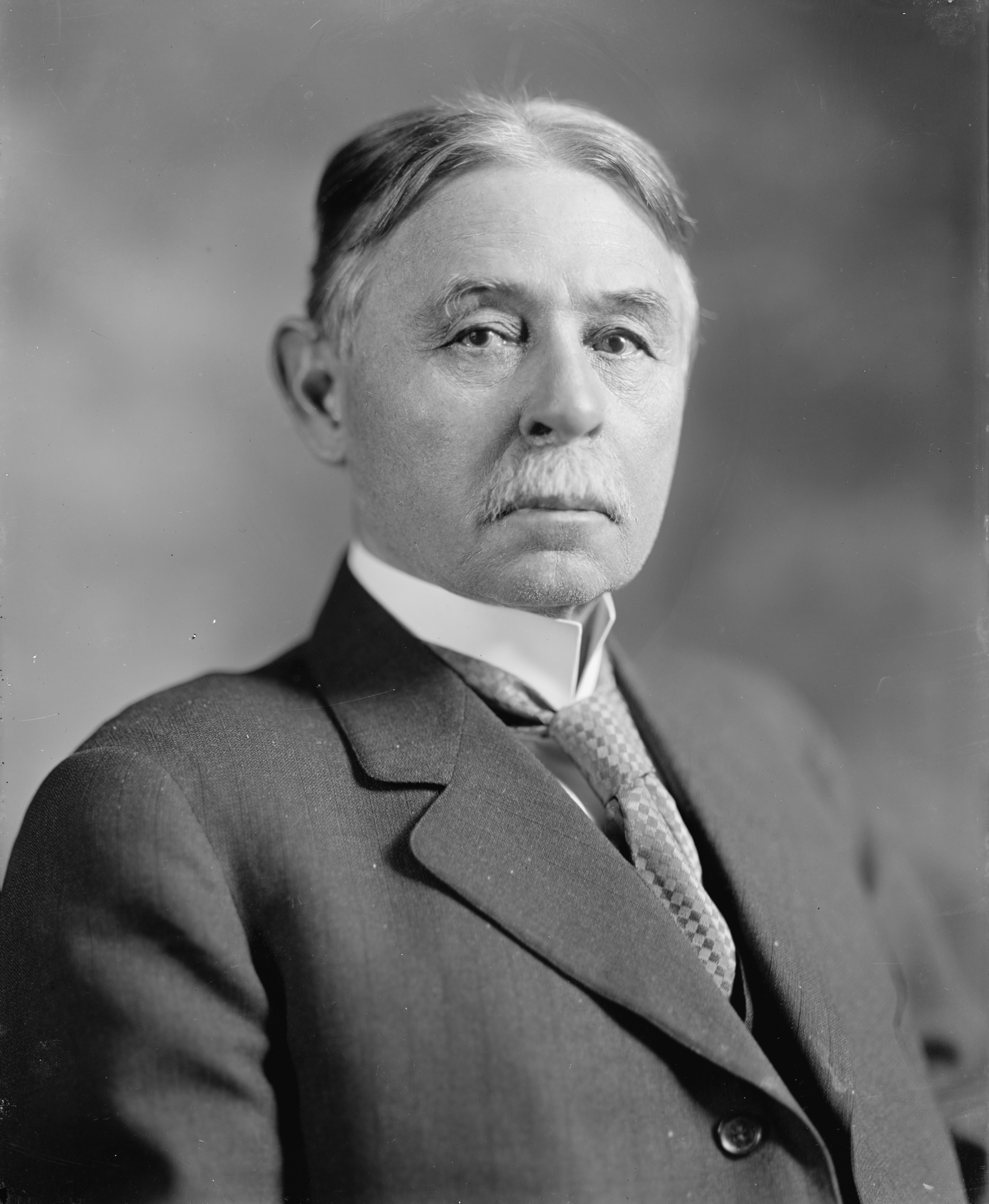
Nominee	F. M. Simmons	A. A. Whitener
Party	Democratic	Republican
Popular vote	295,404	184,393
Percentage	61.57%	38.43%
- County results Simmons: 50–60% 60–70% 70–80% 80–90% 90–100% Whitener: 50–60% 60–70% 80–90%
Senator before election
F. M. Simmons
Democratic
Elected Senator
F. M. Simmons
Democratic

1924 United States Senate election in North Carolina
Party	Candidate	Votes	%
Democratic	F. M. Simmons (incumbent)	295,404	61.57%
Republican	A. A. Whitener	184,393	38.43%
Majority		111,011	23.14%
Turnout		479,797	
Democratic hold			

== Oklahoma ==
1924 United States Senate election in Oklahoma
- November 4, 1924
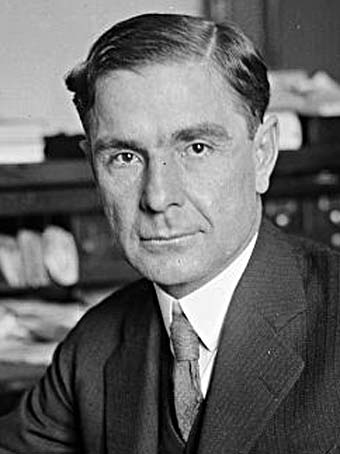

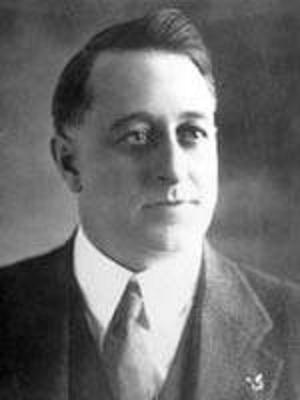
Nominee	William B. Pine	Jack C. Walton
Party	Republican	Democratic
Popular vote	339,646	196,417
Percentage	61.46%	35.54%
- County results Pine: 40–50% 50–60% 60–70% 70–80% Walton: 40–50% 50–60% 60–70%
U.S. senator before election
Robert L. Owen
Democratic
Elected U.S. Senator
William B. Pine
Republican

1924 United States Senate election in Oklahoma
Party	Candidate	Votes	%
Republican	William B. Pine (incumbent)	341,518	61.65%
Democratic	John C. Walton	196,473	35.47%
Farmer–Labor	George Wilson	15,936	2.88%
Majority		145,045	26.18%
Turnout		553,927	
Republican gain from Democratic			

== Oregon ==
1924 United States Senate election in Oregon
- November 4, 1924
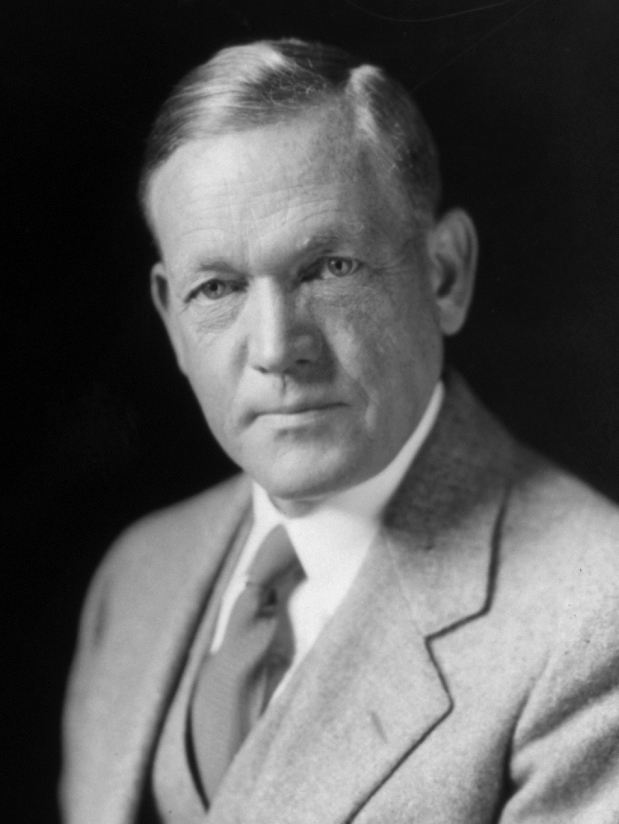
Nominee	Charles L. McNary	Milton A. Miller
Party	Republican	Democratic
Popular vote	174,672	65,340
Percentage	65.96%	24.67%
- County results McNary: 50–60% 60–70% 70–80%
Senator before election
Charles L. McNary
Republican
Elected Senator
Charles L. McNary
Republican

1924 United States Senate election in Oregon
Party	Candidate	Votes	%
Republican	Charles L. McNary (incumbent)	174,672	65.96%
Democratic	Milton A. Miller	65,340	24.67%
Progressive Party (United States, 1924)	F. E. Coulter	20,379	7.70%
Socialist Labor	R. Robinson	4,412	1.67%
Majority		109,332	41.29%
Turnout		264,803	
Republican hold			

== Rhode Island ==
=== Rhode Island (special) ===
1924 United States Senate election in Rhode Island
Party	Candidate	Votes	%
Republican	Jesse H. Metcalf	116,572	56.38%
Democratic	William S. Flynn	88,138	42.63%
Workers	James P. Reid	1,214	0.59%
Liberal Independent	Edward M. Sullivan	845	0.41%
Majority		28,434	13.75%
Turnout		206,769	
Republican hold			

=== Rhode Island (regular) ===
1924 United States Senate election in Rhode Island
Party	Candidate	Votes	%
Republican	Jesse H. Metcalf	120,815	57.63%
Democratic	William S. Flynn	87,620	41.80%
Liberal Independent	Edward M. Sullivan	475	0.23%
Workers	James P. Reid	419	0.20%
Socialist Labor	Peter McDermott	297	0.14%
Majority		33,195	15.83%
Turnout		209,626	
Republican hold			

== South Carolina ==
1924 Democratic Senate primary runoff in South Carolina
- September 9, 1924
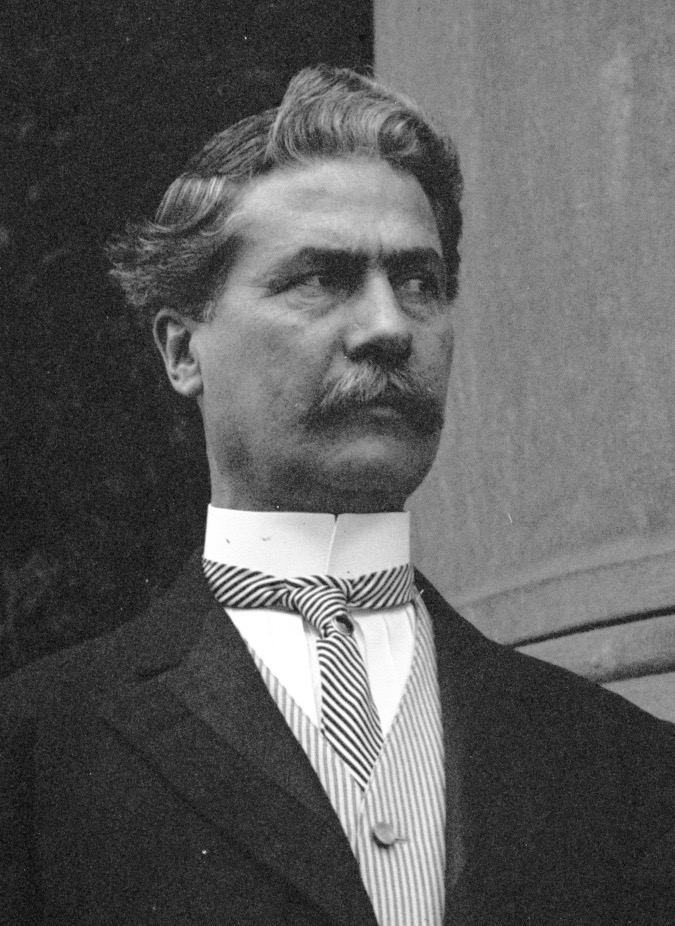

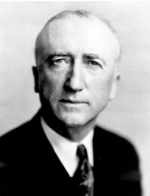
Nominee	Cole Blease	James F. Byrnes
Party	Democratic	Democratic
Popular vote	100,738	98,467
Percentage	50.57%	49.43%
- Results by county Blease: 50–60% 60–70% Byrnes: 50–60% 60–70% 70–80%
U.S. senator before election
Nathaniel B. Dial
Democratic
Elected U.S. Senator
Coleman Livingston Blease
Democratic

1924 United States Senate election in South Carolina
Party	Candidate	Votes	%
Democratic	Coleman Livingston Blease	50,751	100.00%
Democratic hold			

== South Dakota ==
1924 United States Senate election in South Dakota
- November 4, 1924
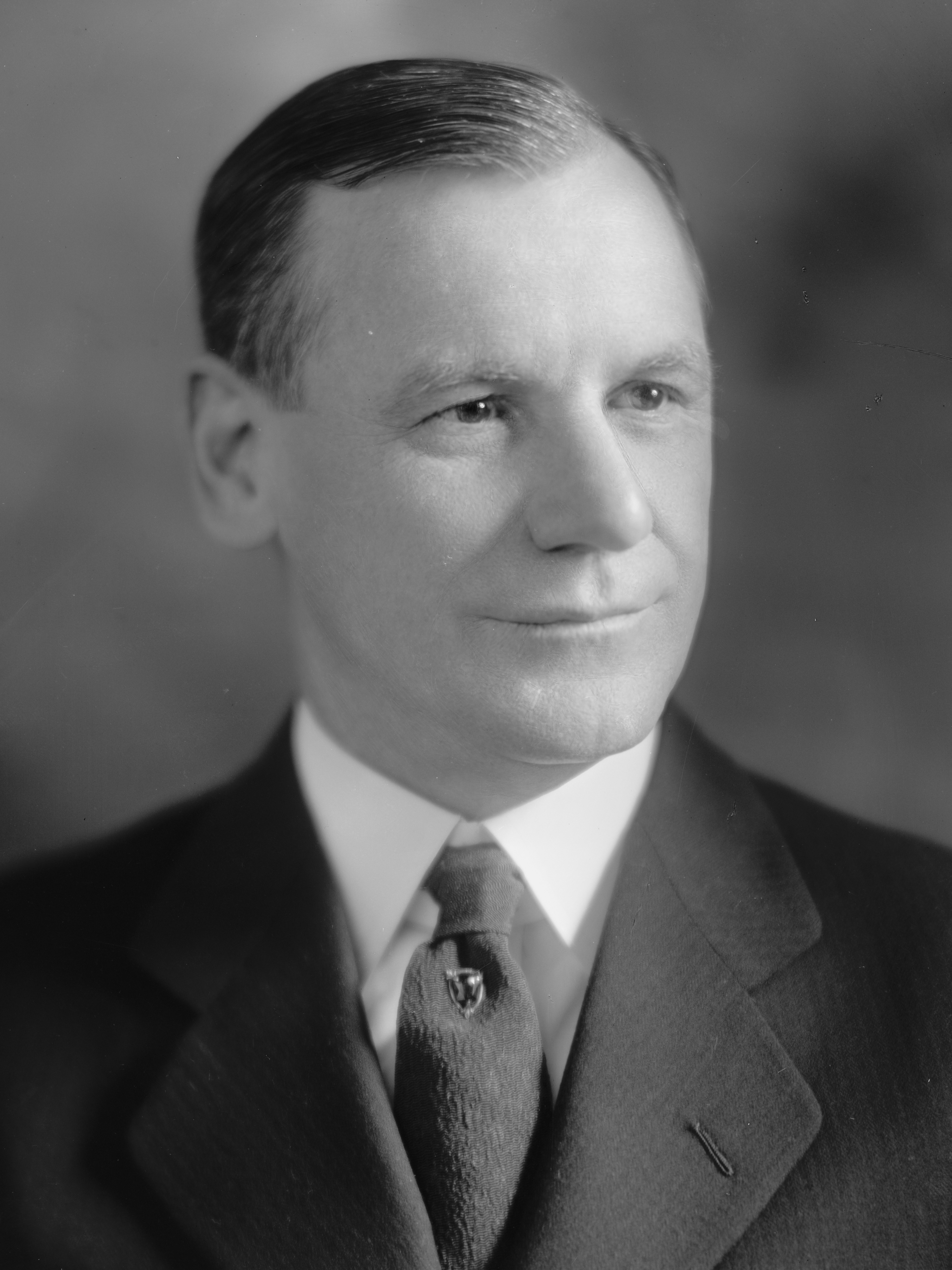

Nominee	William H. McMaster	Ulysses Cherry
Party	Republican	Democratic
Popular vote	90,006	63,728
Percentage	44.13%	31.24%
Nominee	Tom Ayres	George W. Egan
Party	Farmer–Labor	Independent
Popular vote	20,952	14,484
Percentage	10.27%	7.10%
- County results McMaster: 30–40% 40–50% 50–60% 60–70% 70–80% 80–90% Cherry: 30–40% 40–50% 50–60% Ayres: 40–50% No vote
U.S. senator before election
Thomas Sterling
Republican
Elected U.S. Senator
William H. McMaster
Republican

1924 United States Senate election in South Dakota
Party	Candidate	Votes	%
Republican	William H. McMaster	90,310	45.40%
Democratic	U. S. G. Cherry	63,818	32.08%
Farmer–Labor	Tom Ayres	23,962	12.05%
Independent	George Egan	14,390	7.23%
Independent	Charles Hall Dillon	3,930	1.98%
Independent	Loucks	1,380	0.69%
Independent	Don Livingston	1,122	0.56%
Majority		26,492	13.32%
Turnout		198,912	
Republican hold			

== Tennessee ==
1924 United States Senate election in Tennessee
- November 4, 1924
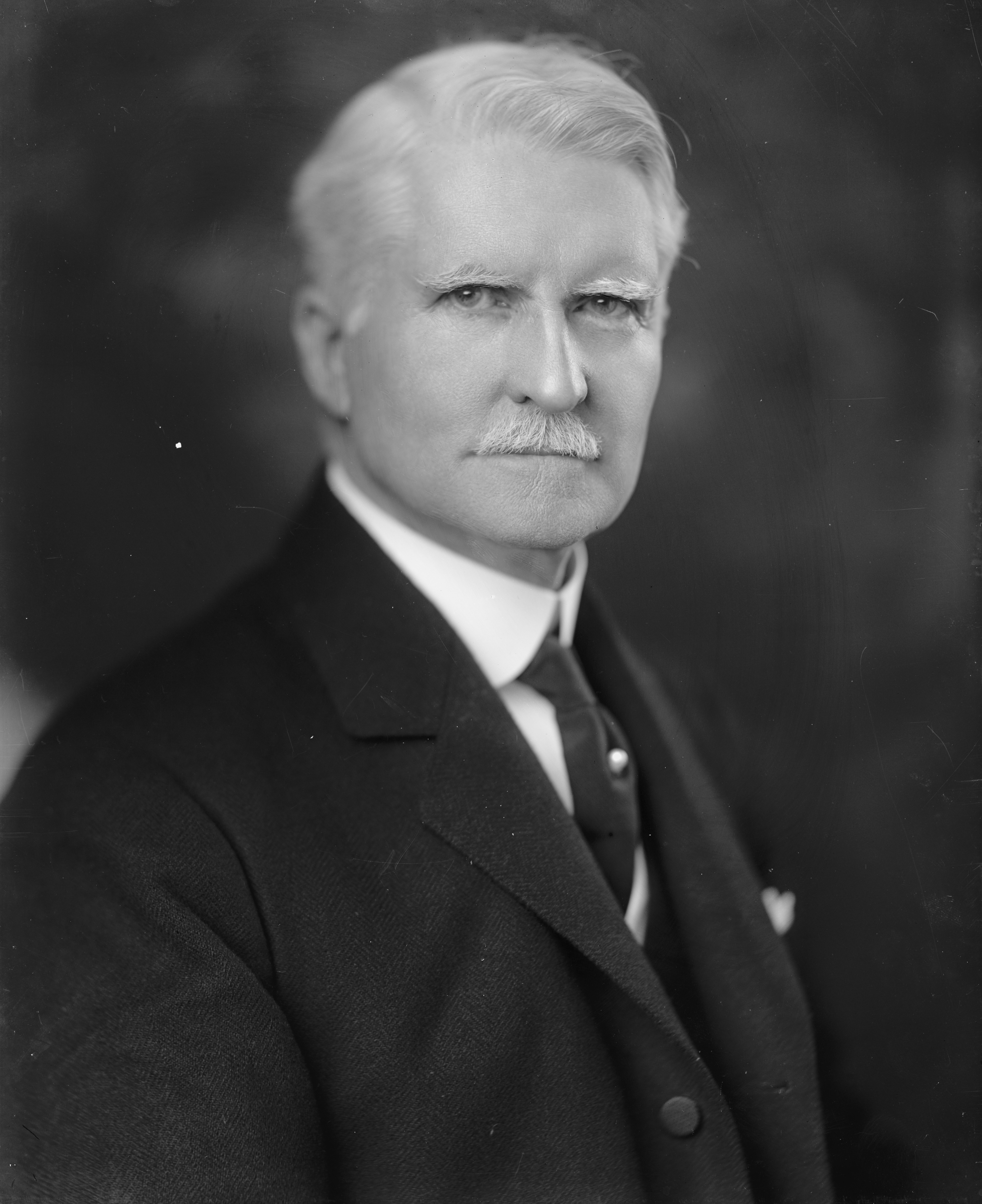

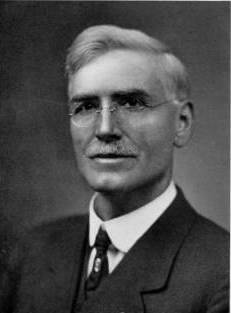
Nominee	Lawrence Tyson	Hugh B. Lindsay
Party	Democratic	Republican
Popular vote	147,871	109,859
Percentage	57.32%	42.59%
- Tyson: 50–60% 60–70% 70–80% 80–90% 90–100% Lindsay: 50–60% 60–70% 70–80% 80–90% 90–100%
Senator before election
John K. Shields
Democratic
Elected Senator
Lawrence Tyson
Democratic

1924 United States Senate election in Tennessee
Party	Candidate	Votes	%
Democratic	Lawrence Tyson	147,871	57.32%
Republican	Hugh B. Lindsay	109,859	42.59%
Independent	S. B. Williams	242	0.09%
Majority		38,012	14.73%
Turnout		257,972	
Democratic hold			

== Texas ==
1924 United States Senate election in Texas
- November 4, 1924
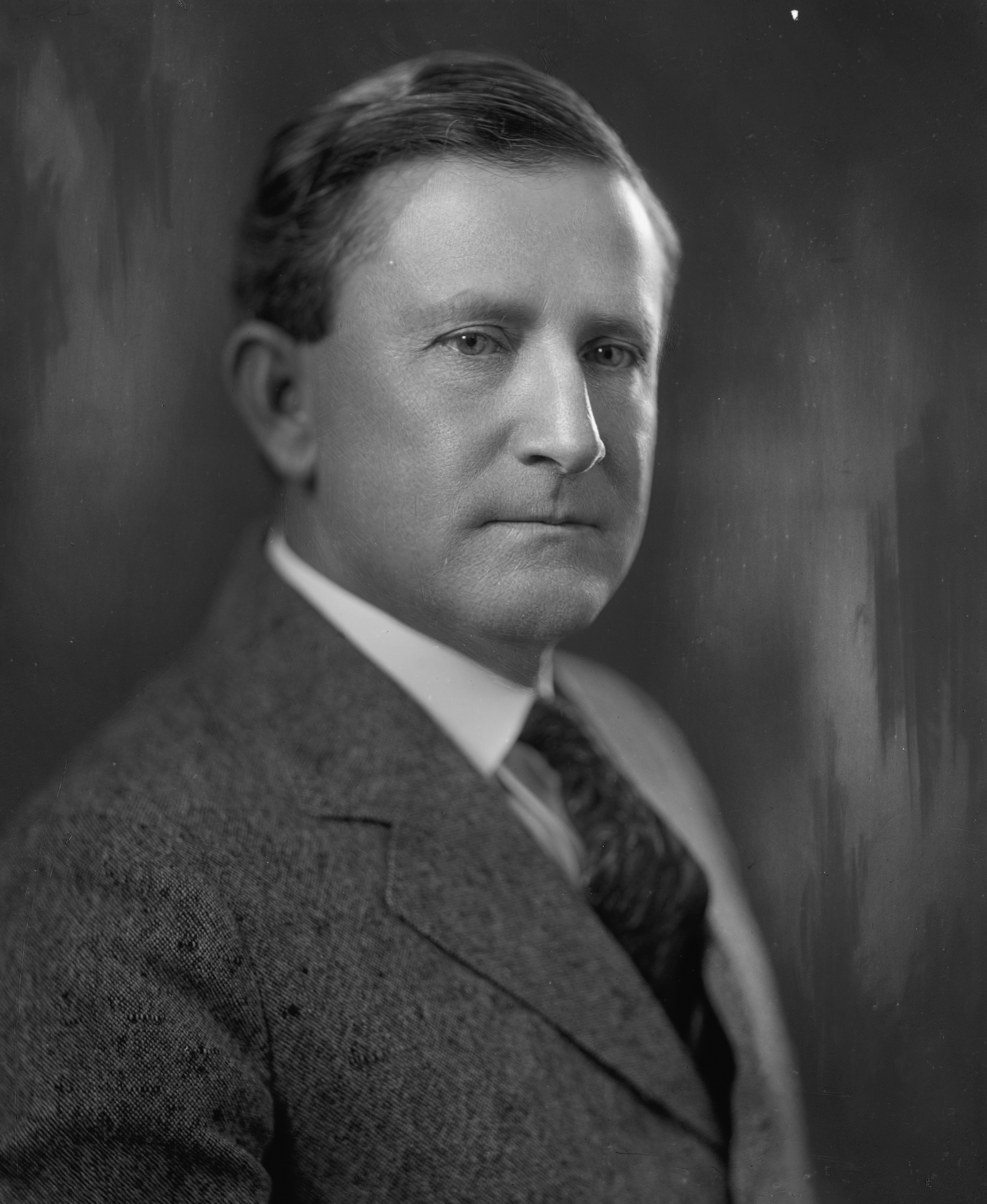

Nominee	Morris Sheppard	T. M. Kennerly
Party	Democratic	Republican
Popular vote	591,913	101,208
Percentage	85.40%	14.60%
- County results Sheppard: 50–60% 60–70% 70–80% 80–90% >90% Kennerly: 50–60% 60–70% No vote
U.S. senator before election
Morris Sheppard
Democratic
Elected U.S. Senator
Morris Sheppard
Democratic

1924 United States Senate election in Texas
Party	Candidate	Votes	%
Democratic	Morris Sheppard (incumbent)	591,913	85.40%
Republican	T. M. Kennerly	101,208	14.60%
Majority		490,705	70.80%
Turnout		693,121	
Democratic hold			

== Virginia ==
Virginia election
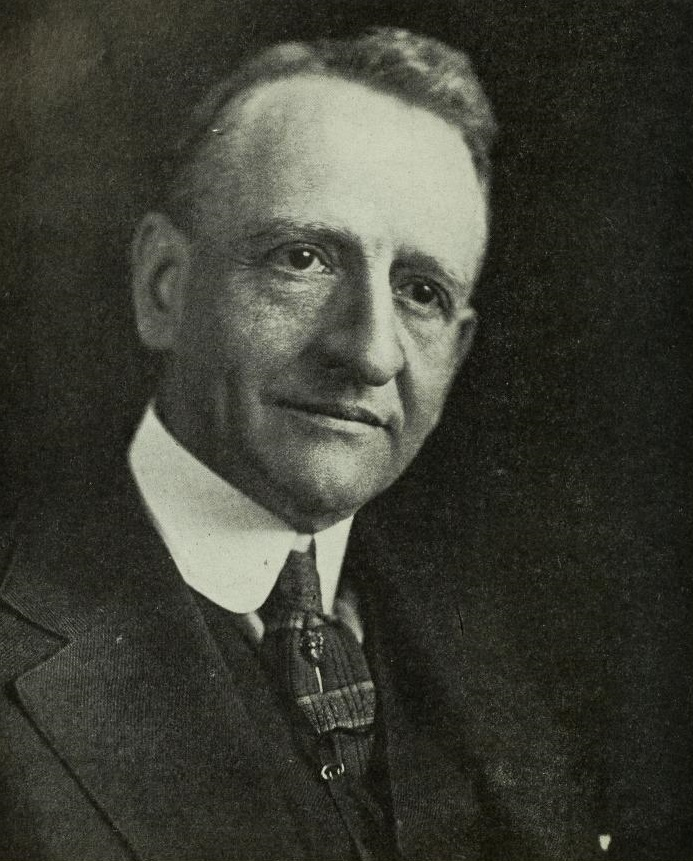

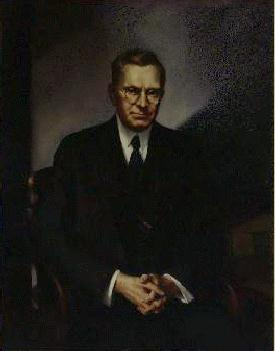
Nominee	Carter Glass	William N. Doak
Party	Democratic	Republican
Popular vote	151,498	50,092
Percentage	73.1%	24.2%
- County results Glass: 40–50% 50–60% 60–70% 70–80% 80–90% 90–100% Doak: 40–50% 50–60%
U.S. senator before election
Carter Glass
Democratic
Elected U.S. Senator
Carter Glass
Democratic

1924 United States Senate election in Virginia
Party	Candidate	Votes	%
Democratic	Carter Glass (incumbent)	151,498	73.12%
Republican	W. N. Noak	50,092	24.18%
Progressive Party (US, 1924)	Carroll L. Riker	5,594	2.70%
Majority		101,406	48.94%
Turnout		207,184	
Democratic hold			

== West Virginia ==
1924 United States Senate election in West Virginia
- November 4, 1924
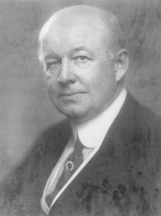

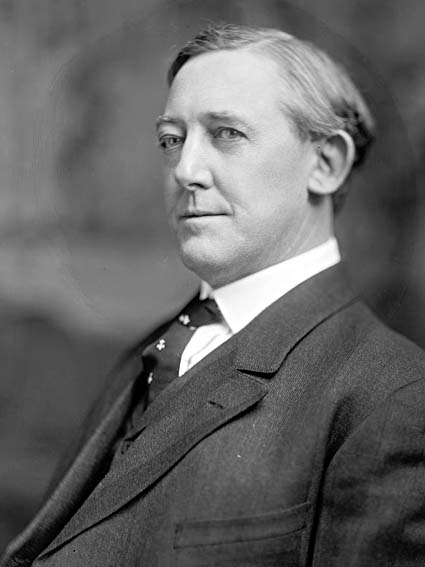
Nominee	Guy D. Goff	William E. Chilton
Party	Republican	Democratic
Popular vote	290,004	271,809
Percentage	50.92%	47.72%
- County results Goff: 40–50% 50–60% 60–70% 70–80% Chilton: 50–60% 60–70% 70–80%
U.S. senator before election
Davis Elkins
Republican
Elected U.S. Senator
Guy D. Goff
Republican

1924 United States Senate election in West Virginia
Party	Candidate	Votes	%
Republican	Guy D. Goff	290,004	50.92%
Democratic	William E. Chilton	271,809	47.72%
Socialist	M. S. Holt	7,751	1.36%
Majority		18,195	3.20%
Turnout		569,564	
Republican hold			

== Wyoming ==
1924 United States Senate election in Wyoming
- November 4, 1924
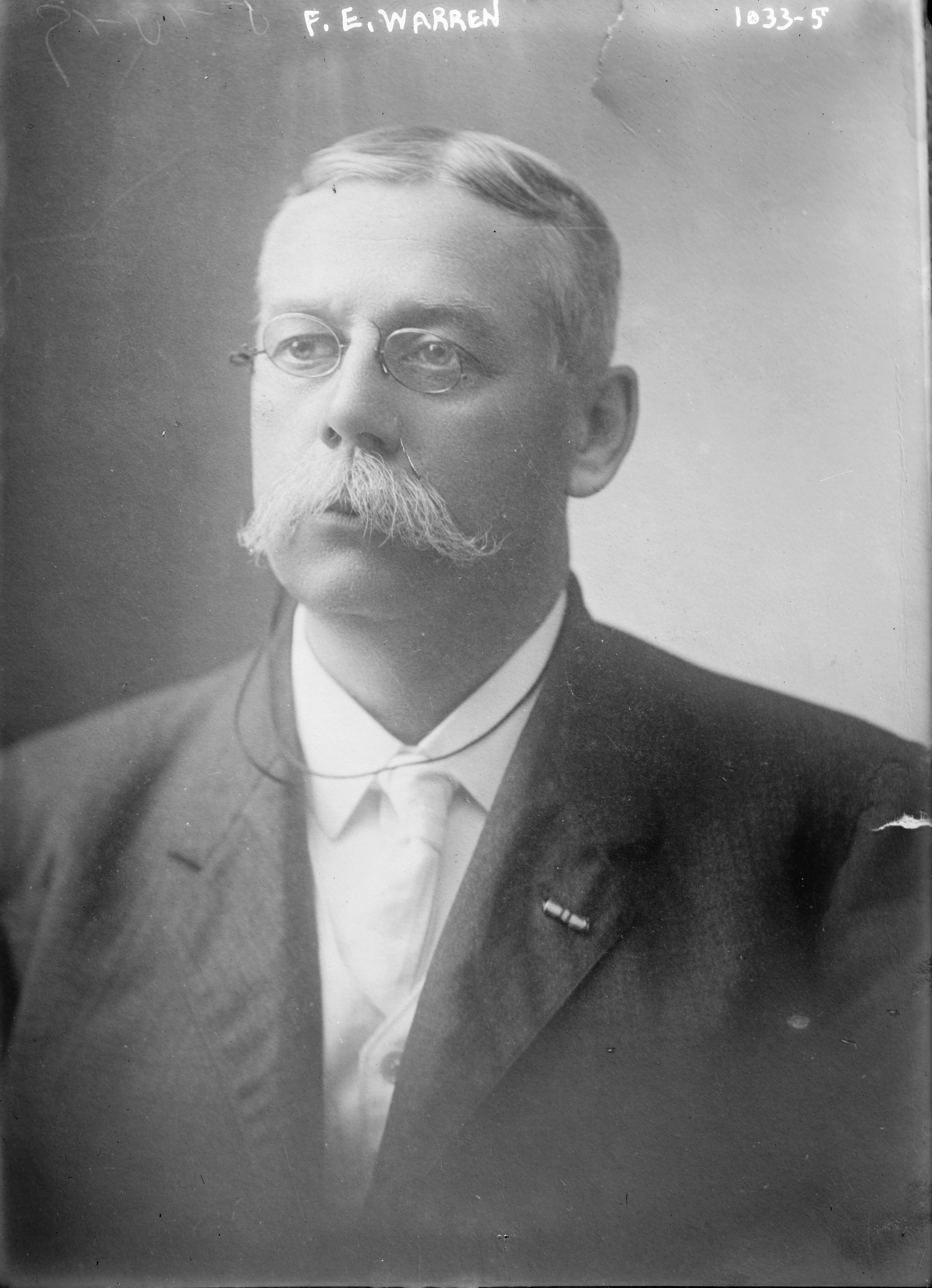
Nominee	Francis E. Warren	Robert R. Rose
Party	Republican	Democratic
Popular vote	41,293	33,536
Percentage	53.04%	43.07%
- County results Warren: 50–60% 60–70% 70–80% Rose: 50–60% No data/vote
U.S. senator before election
Francis E. Warren
Republican
Elected U.S. Senator
Francis E. Warren
Republican

1924 United States Senate election in Wyoming
Party	Candidate	Votes	%
Republican	Francis E. Warren (incumbent)	41,293	53.04%
Democratic	Robert R. Rose	33,536	43.07%
Progressive Party (US, 1924)	G. E. Kindler	2,224	2.86%
Independent	William B. Guthrie	805	1.03%
Majority		7,757	9.97%
Turnout		77,858	
Republican hold			

== See also ==
- 1924 United States elections
  - 1924 United States presidential election
  - 1924 United States House of Representatives elections
- 68th United States Congress
- 69th United States Congress
