= Buis =

Buis is a Dutch surname that may refer to

- Dale R. Buis (1921–1959), U.S. Army Major killed in Vietnam
- Dyan Buis (born 1990), South African Paralympic sprinter and long jumper
- Greg Buis, American reality show contestant
- Jan Buis (born 1933), Dutch cyclist
- Leen Buis (1906–1986), Dutch cyclist
- Lela E. Buis, American speculative fiction writer, playwright, poet and artist
- Marjolein Buis (born 1988), Dutch wheelchair tennis player
- Tom Buis, former president of the American National Farmers Union

BUIS may also refer to

- Backup iron sights, a type of firearm sights
