= Anna Dickie Olesen =

American politician

Anna Olesen
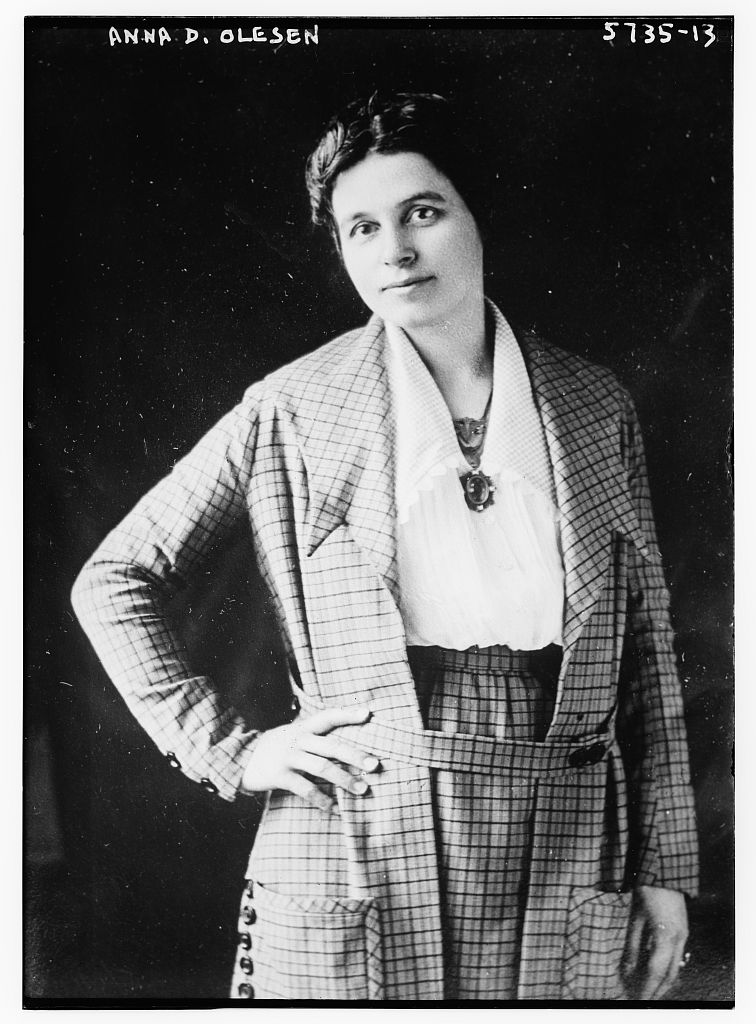

Personal details
- Born: July 3, 1885 Cordova Township, Minnesota, U.S.
- Died: May 21, 1971 (aged 85) Northfield, Minnesota, U.S.
- Party: Democratic

Anna Dickie Olesen (July 3, 1885 – May 21, 1971) was an American politician from the state of Minnesota who was the first woman to be nominated by a major party for the United States Senate.

== Early life ==
Olesen was born in Cordova Township, Le Sueur County, Minnesota to Peter Daniel and Margaret Jones Dickie. She had two younger brothers: Lewis, born in 1891, and Owen, born in 1984. Her family were Methodists and supported the teetotalism movement. The family were also Republicans, but switched to supporting the Democratic Party in 1890s, an affiliation which Olesen retained. Olesen attended a country school for eight years and then attended and graduated from Waterville High School. She then became a teacher. On June 8, 1905, she married Peter Olesen at the age of nineteen. Peter was a Danish immigrant who was a student at Hamline University. They had been introduced when Peter made a visit to Waterville. They had one daughter together, Mary. The new couple settled in Saint Paul, Minnesota, but moved twice to accommodate Peter's job as a school superintendent: once to Pine City, Minnesota in 1908, then to Cloquet, Minnesota shortly after. They lost their home in Cloquet due to a fire in 1918, but chose to remain.

== Political career ==
Olesen became a travelling Chautauqua speaker to support her family's income, through which she gained national attention. She focused specifically on issues such as women's suffrage and Prohibition. The acquaintances she gained included William Jennings Bryan, who was a supporter of the women's suffrage movement and of Olesen's involvement in politics. Olesen became known as an effective orator, and in 1920 she became the first woman to speak at the Democrats' Jackson Day dinner, which furthered her popularity as a speaker.

Olesen's first foray into politics beyond her speaking ventures came in June 1920 when she became a delegate to the Democratic National Convention. Then, in 1922, she was elected by Minnesota's Democratic convention to be the party's nominee for the United States Senate with over 47 percent of the vote, becoming the first woman to be nominated for the position by a major party in any state. Her competitors for the general election included Henrik Shipstead, nominated by the Farmer-Labor party and Frank B. Kellogg, the incumbent Republican. Despite extensive campaigning efforts, Shipstead won the election with Kellogg coming in second and Olesen in third.

Despite her electoral defeat, Olesen remained active in politics within the Democratic party, including as a delegate to party conventions and as a speaker for the campaigns of other Democratic candidates, and she also continued her speaking career on the Chautauqua circuit. In 1923 she moved to Northfield, Minnesota so that Peter could take on a job at Carleton College as a registrar and German professor. In 1934, President Franklin D. Roosevelt appointed her state director of the National Emergency Council. She retained her position on the National Emergency Council, transformed into the Office of Government Reports in 1939, until 1942 when the position was eliminated. Her political involvement also included service on the Minnesota State Planning Board and the Minnesota Resources Committee, and she was also involved with organizations such as the General Federation of Women's Clubs and the League of Women Voters, among others.

== Later life ==
Olesen retired in 1942 after exiting her position as state director. In 1949 she and Peter moved to Macon, Georgia, where Peter took a position teaching German at Mercer University. They moved back to Northfield upon Peter's retirement. Peter died in 1960. Olesen then married Chester Burge. Chester died in 1963.

Olesen died at the age of 85 after a fall on May 21, 1971, in Northfield, Minnesota. She is buried in Waterville.

Party political offices
| Preceded by Daniel Lawler | Democratic nominee for U.S. Senator from Minnesota (Class 1); 1922 | Vacant Title next held by Einar Hoidale |
