= Byron G. Allen =

American politician (1901–1988)

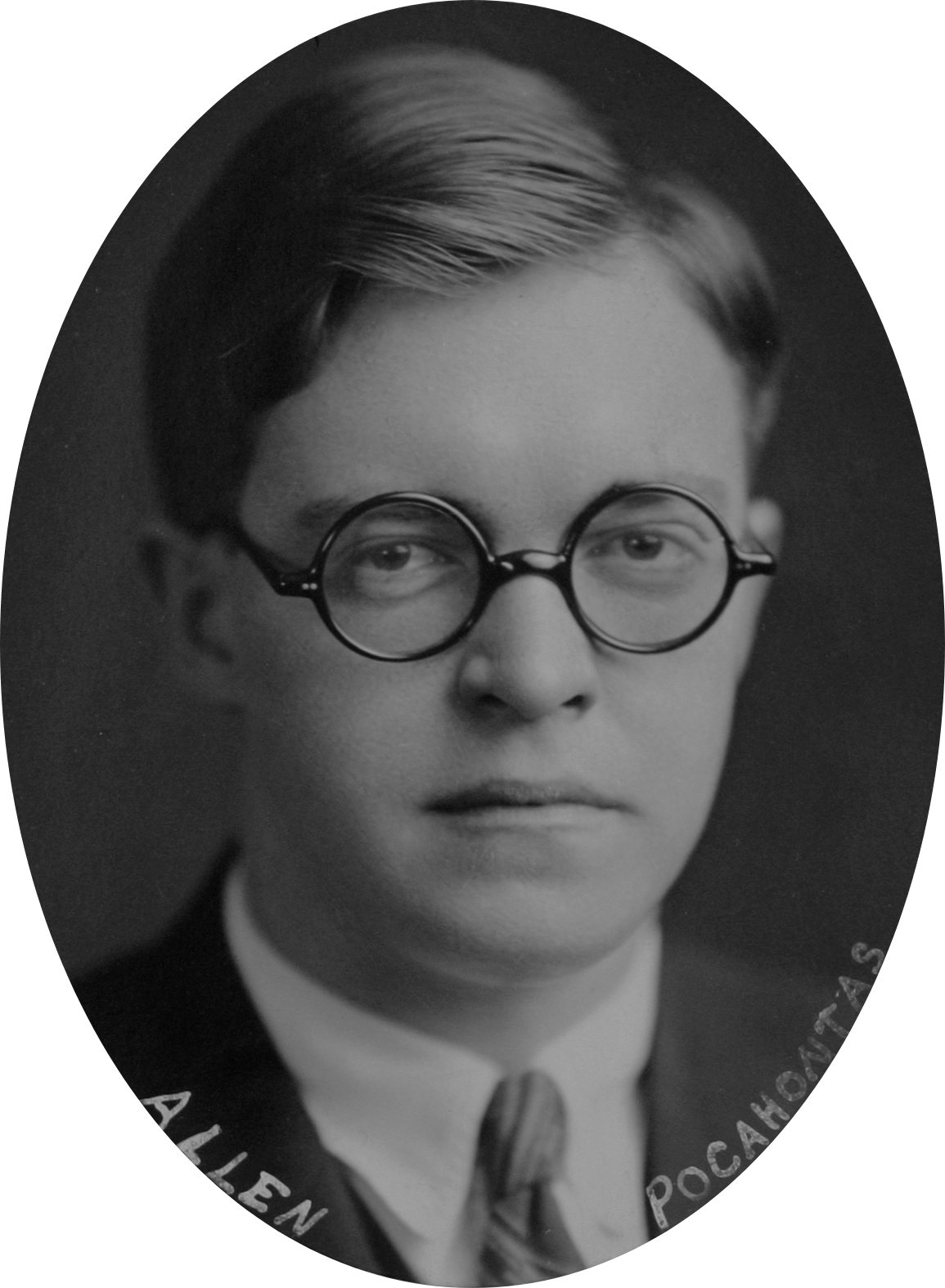

Commissioner of the Minnesota Department of Agriculture
- In office 1955–1961
- Governor: Orville Freeman

Member of the Iowa House of Representatives from the 77th district
- In office January 10, 1927 – January 8, 1933
- Preceded by: Arna G. Rassler
- Succeeded by: Marion Bruce

Personal details
- Born: Byron Gilchrist Allen; September 13, 1901 Laurens, Iowa, U.S.
- Died: June 10, 1988 (aged 86) Detroit Lakes, Minnesota, U.S.
- Party: Minnesota Democratic–Farmer–Labor Party; Republican (until 1933)
- Education: Iowa State College

Byron Gilchrist Allen (September 13, 1901 – June 10, 1988) was an American politician who was the first nominee of the Minnesota Democratic–Farmer–Labor Party for governor. He subsequently served as the commissioner of the Minnesota Department of Agriculture from 1955 to 1961, in addition to previously serving in the Iowa House of Representatives from 1927 to 1933, representing Iowa's 77th House of Representatives district as a member of the Republican Party.

== Early life and education ==
Born in Laurens, Iowa, Allen attended Iowa State College (now Iowa State University) from 1920 to 1924. At Iowa State, Allen was a member of the Phi Delta Theta fraternity.

== Career ==
Allen was a newspaper editor by trade, and served in the Iowa House of Representatives from 1927 to 1933 as a Republican. He unsuccessfully sought election to the U.S. House of Representatives from Iowa in 1940.

Allen was a supporter of Franklin D. Roosevelt, and referred to Republican concerns over Roosevelt's long term a 'phony issue', and brought attention to Harold Knutson, a Republican member of congress who had served for (at the time) 26 years, compared to Roosevelt's twelve.

Byron G. Allen was nominated for governor by the newly formed Democratic-Farmer-Labor Party in 1944. Allen was from the Democratic wing, as an unknown dark horse candidate. Allen's oratory skills were credited to his nomination. Allen was also supported by Vice President Henry A. Wallace. Allen ran as a liberal, running on a more moderate platform than the Farmer-Labor party had in previous elections, what was called 'progressive but not radical'. Allen also made clear he believed conservatives had no place in the DFL. Allen's strategy was to ensure the DFL fell in line with him and his campaign manager Hubert Humphrey, and once the party was united behind them, victory over the Republicans would follow. Allen was unsuccessful, and incumbent Republican Edward John Thye won the election.

Allen later served as commissioner of the Minnesota Department of Agriculture from 1955 to 1961 under Governor Orville Freeman, and as assistant U.S. secretary of agriculture from 1961 to 1969, also under Freeman, who was appointed U.S. secretary of agriculture by President John F. Kennedy.

== Personal life ==
Allen was married to Elsa Ellanora Erickson. He died in Detroit Lakes, Minnesota on June 10, 1988.

Party political offices
Preceded by Party Created	Endorsed Gubernatorial Candidate, Minnesota DFL State Convention; 1944	Succeeded by Harold H. Barker
Preceded by Hjalmar Petersen; Farmer–Labor Party	DFL nominee for Governor of Minnesota; 1944	Succeeded by Harold H. Barker
Preceded by John D. Sullivan; Democratic Party	DFL nominee for Governor of Minnesota; 1944	Succeeded by Harold H. Barker
