= Normandale Community College =

Public college in Bloomington, Minnesota, US

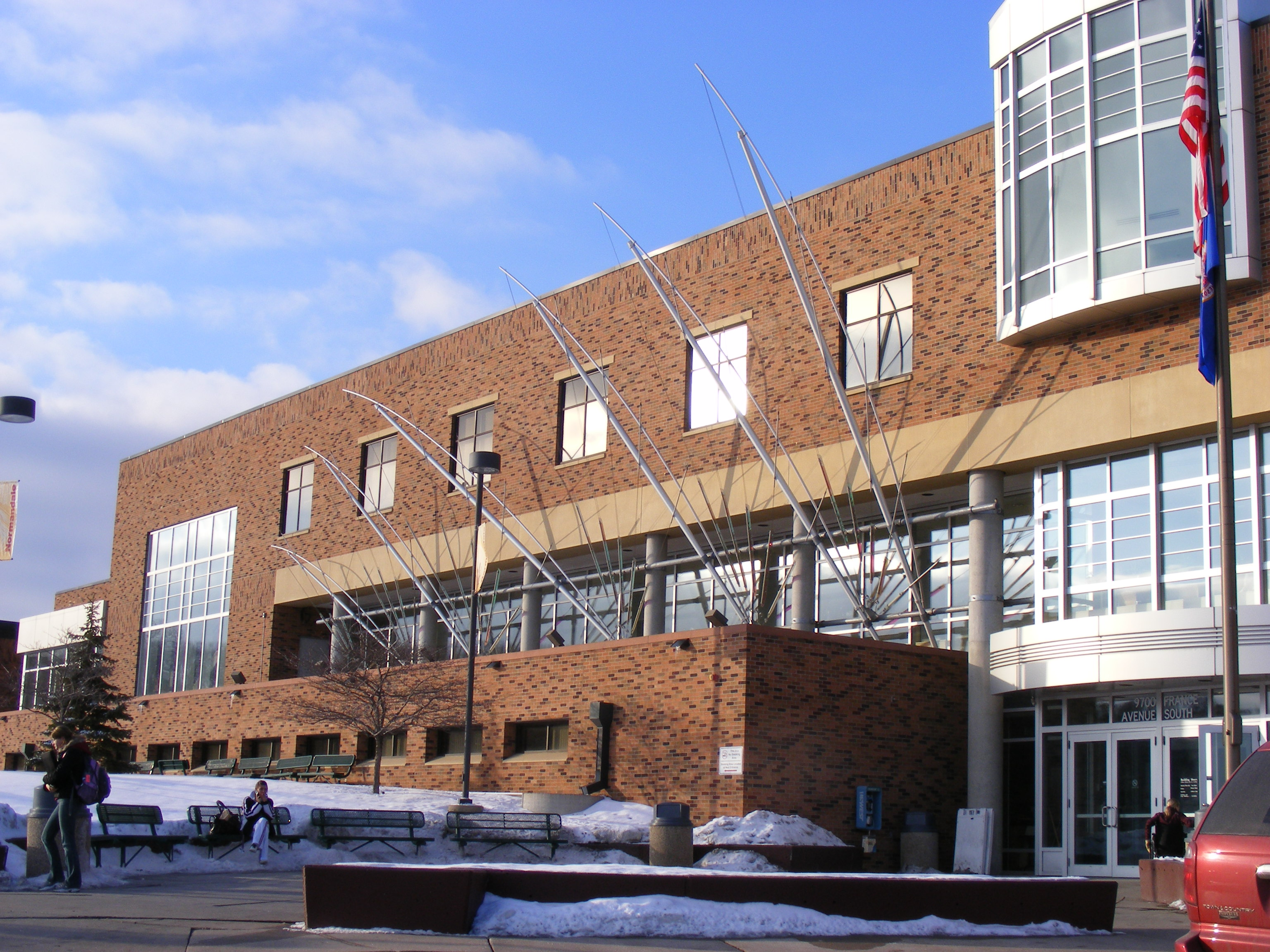
- Former name: Normandale State Junior College
- Type: Public community college
- Established: 1968
- Parent institution: Minnesota State Colleges and Universities
- President: Pakou Yang
- Students: 16,819 (2024-2025)
- Location: Bloomington, Minnesota, United States; 44°49′46″N 93°19′52″W
- Campus: 90 acres (36 ha)
- Colors: Scarlet and gold
- Nickname: Lions
- Mascot: Norman the Lion
- Website: www.normandale.edu

Normandale Community College is a public community college in Bloomington, Minnesota. The college serves primarily the communities of the southwestern portion of the Minneapolis–Saint Paul metropolitan area. Established in 1968 as Normandale State Junior College with an initial enrollment of 1,358 students; today Normandale annually enrolls more than 16,000 students. Normandale is a member of the Minnesota State Colleges and Universities system.

== Campus ==
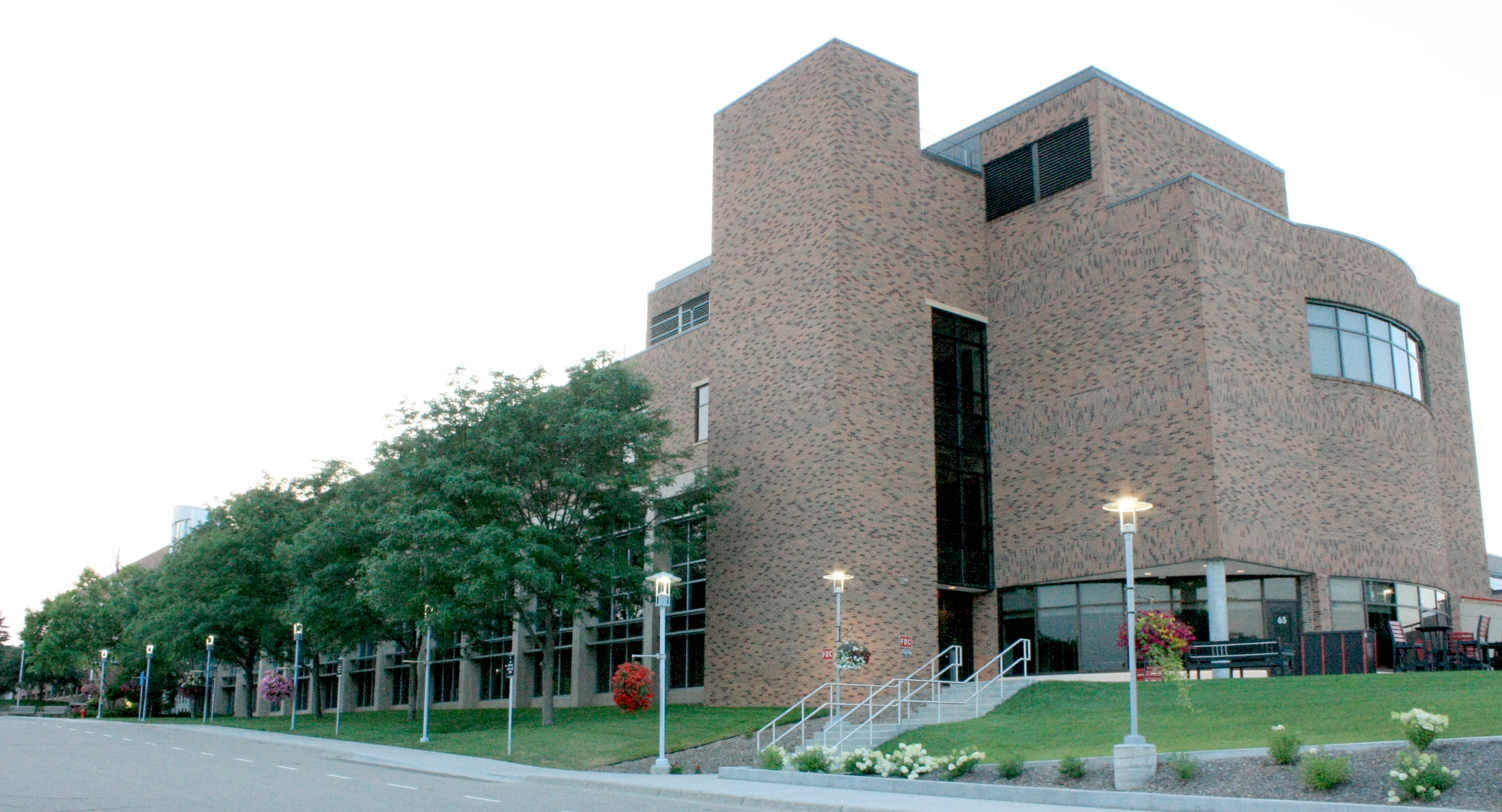
College Services building

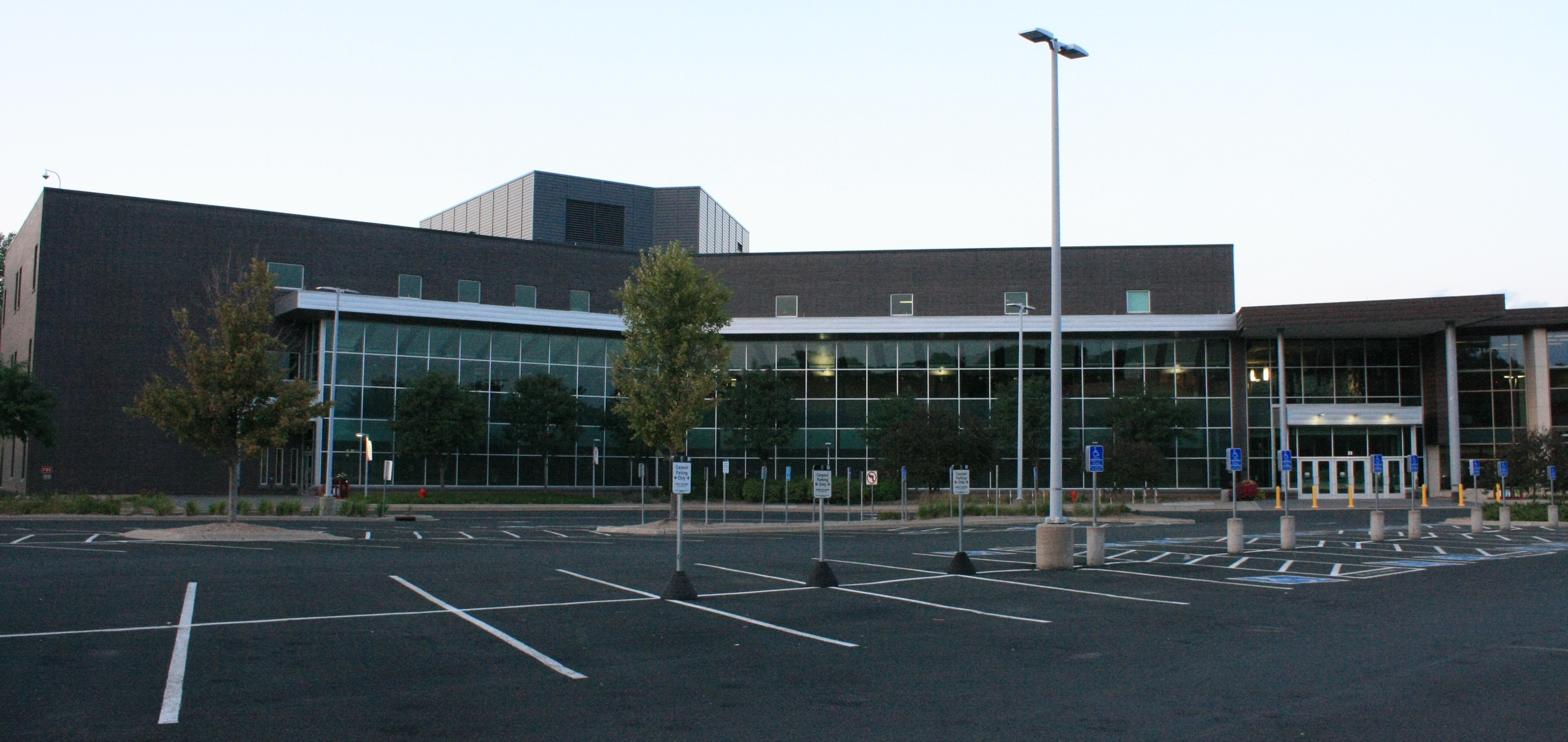
Normandale Student Center

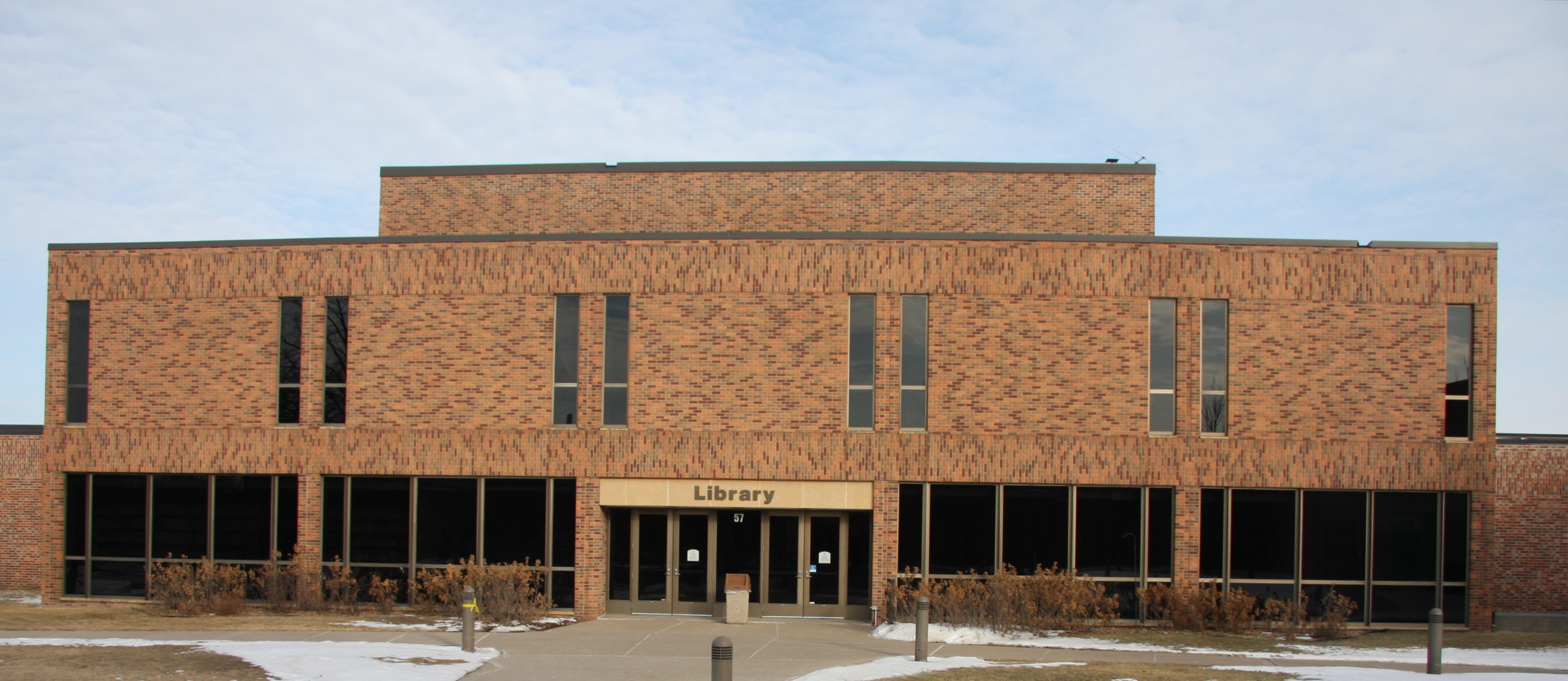
Entrance to the library building at Normandale Community College

Normandale Community College is located at West 98th Street and France Avenue South in Bloomington, Minnesota, on a 90-acre (36 ha) site 2 miles (3.2 km) south of Interstate 494. The campus is accessible to persons with disabilities, and features eight contemporary brick buildings around a central courtyard. These buildings include the following: Academic Partnership Center, Activities, Building Services, College Services, Fine Arts, Library, Science, and a newly renovated Student Center. The campus also features a Japanese Garden. The Academic Partnership Center is in conjunction with Minnesota State University, Mankato. A 727-space four story parking ramp opened in Fall 2012.

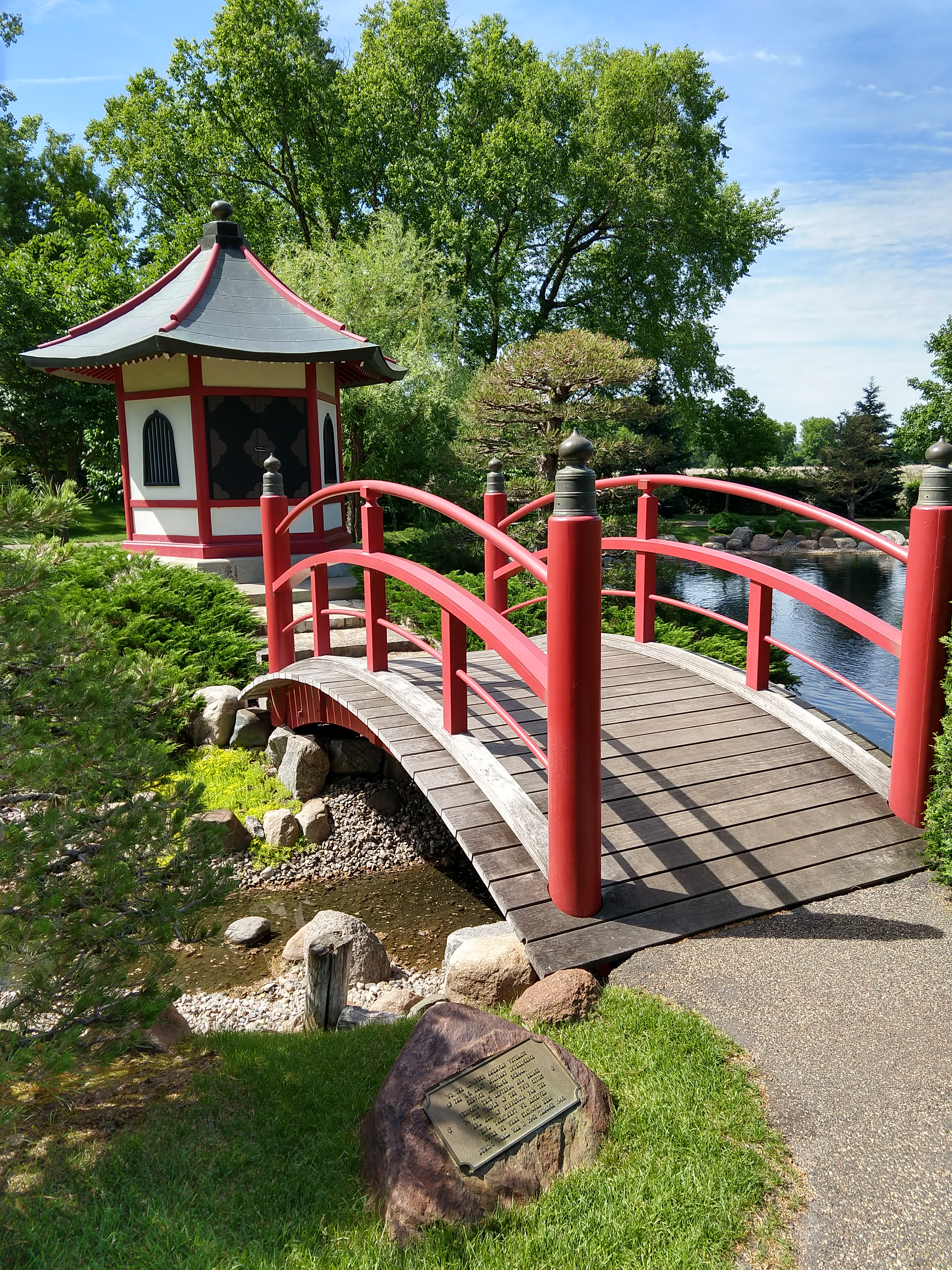
Normandale Community College Japanese garden

The Minnesota Japanese School, a weekend Japanese educational program, previously held its classes at the college. Additionally, Nine Mile Creek transects the college campus near East Marsh Lake Park's wetlands and was the initial site for their host city's "Adopt-A-Wetland" service learning prototype (2003–2004).

== Accreditation ==
Normandale Community College is accredited by the Higher Learning Commission. Individual program accreditations include: American Dental Association, American Dietetic Association, Association of Collegiate Business Schools and Programs, Commission on Accreditation of Allied Health Education Programs, Minnesota State Board of Nursing, and the National League for Nursing. Normandale is one of only four community colleges across the nation that is now accredited in three Fine Arts areas: National Association of Schools of Music, National Association of Schools of Theatre, and the National Association of Schools of Art and Design.

== Notable alumni ==
- Abdimalik Askar — politician, educator, and entrepreneur
- Roger Chamberlain — politician and Republican member of the Minnesota Senate; he represents District 38.
- Mary Liz Holberg — member of the Dakota County, Minnesota Board of Commissioners, and former member of the Minnesota House of Representatives serving District 58A
- Dolal Idd — killed by Minneapolis police in a shootout on December 30, 2020
- Andrew Johnson — Minneapolis City Councilmember
- Thomas E. Petersen, Commissioner of the Minnesota Department of Agriculture
- A. J. Sass — author, children's and young adult fiction
- Chuck Schafer — former member of the Wisconsin State Assembly
