= 1944 Minnesota gubernatorial election =

Election taking place on November 7, 1944

- November 7, 1944
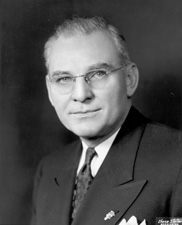

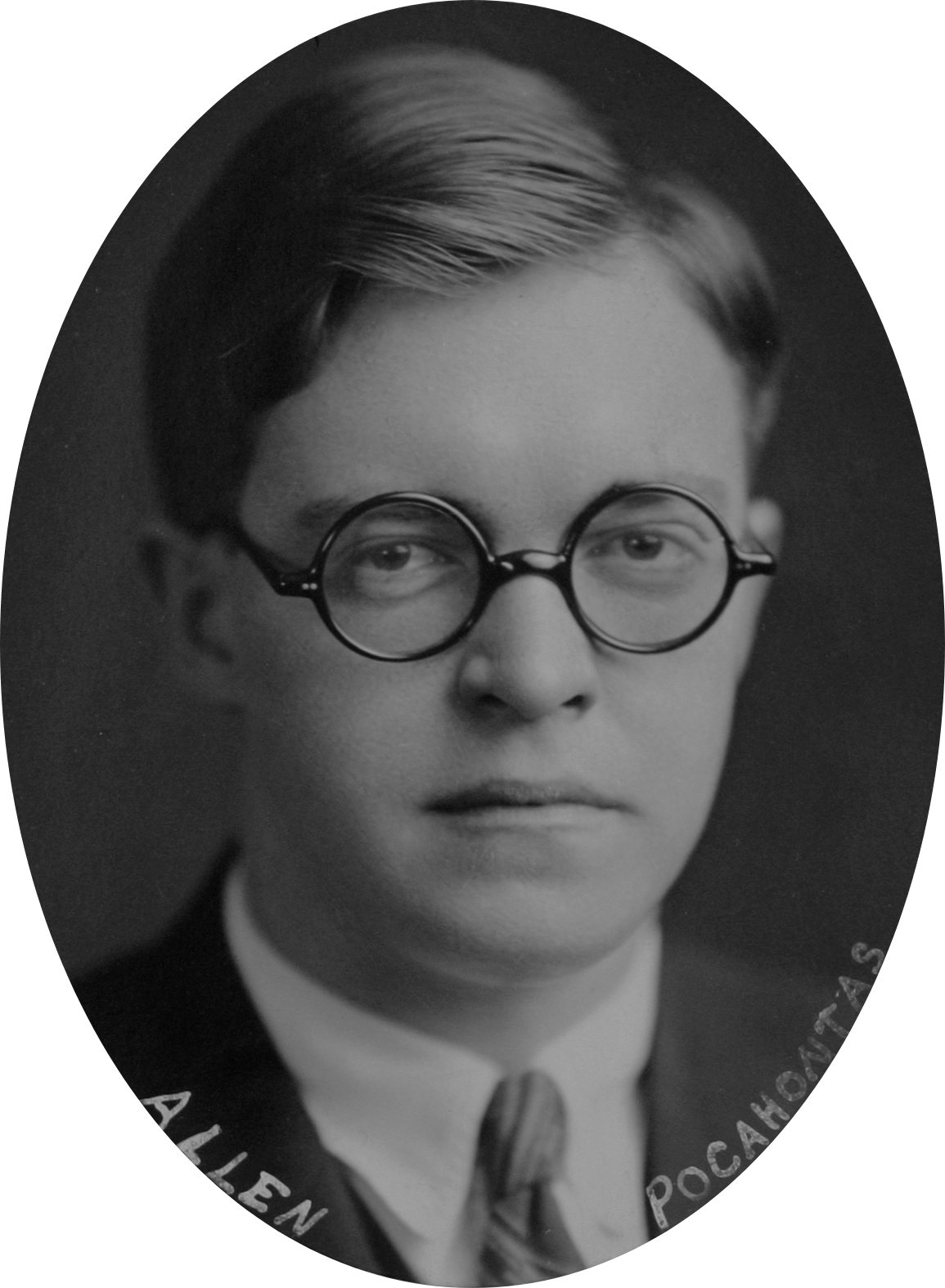
Nominee	Edward John Thye	Byron G. Allen
Party	Republican	Democratic (DFL)
Popular vote	701,185	430,132
Percentage	61.59%	37.78%
- County results Thye: 50–60% 60–70% 70–80% 80–90% Allen: 50–60% 60–70%
Governor before election
Edward John Thye
Republican
Elected Governor
Edward John Thye
Republican

The 1944 Minnesota gubernatorial election took place on November 7, 1944. Republican incumbent Edward John Thye defeated DFL challenger Byron G. Allen. The Democratic Party of Minnesota and Farmer–Labor Party had merged earlier in the year into the DFL, and this was the first election the newly formed party stood in. Thye had taken over as governor after Harold Stassen resigned to join the Navy, due to the ongoing Second World War.

== Republican primary ==
Incumbent Edward John Thye was nominated for a term in his own right.

=== Candidates ===
==== Nominated ====
- Edward J. Thye, incumbent

=== Eliminated in primary ===
- John C. Peterson, painter
- James D. Scarsdale

=== Results ===
Republican Party of Minnesota primary results
Party	Candidate	Votes	%
Republican	Edward John Thye	201,832	88.91%
Republican	John C. Peterson	19,697	8.68%
Republican	James D. Scarsdale	5,469	2.41%
Total votes		226,998	100%

== Democratic-Farmer-Labor primary ==
On April 7, 1944, as the DFL was being founded, a convention was held to determine if an early nomination could be decided. A unanimous agreement was made to nominate Hubert Humphrey. However, Humphrey stated his place was with the other young men serving in the war, and refused to run. He was 33 years old at the time. After Humphrey's refusal, Theodor S. Slen was asked, who also refused to run. The convention dragged past midnight, and through the night. Without a resolution, the convention adjourned at 2:30PM on April 8, after about 24 hours. The convention reconvened on April 9, with 98% of initial delegates returning. Harry Walsh was suggested, who was an attorney and Democrat who supported Farmer-Labor governor Floyd B. Olson, and was seen as a potentially uniting figure. However, he failed to gain support. The hastily put together primary election was held only a few days later, on April 16, 1944.

Byron G. Allen was nominated. He was from the Democratic wing, as an unknown dark horse candidate. Allen's oratory skills were credited to his nomination. He was also supported by Vice President Henry A. Wallace.

Mabel Caroline Wiesner was the first woman to run for governor.

=== Candidates ===
==== Nominated ====
- Byron G. Allen, former secretary of the Iowa Senate

=== Eliminated in primary ===
- Emil E. Holmes, national secretary of World War Veterans
- Mabel Caroline Wiesner, stenographer

=== Results ===
Democratic-Farmer-Labor Party of Minnesota primary results
Party	Candidate	Votes	%
Democratic (DFL)	Byron G. Allen	56,950	56.10%
Democratic (DFL)	Emil E. Holmes	7,230	36.67%
Democratic (DFL)	Mabel Caroline Wiesner	7,338	7.23%
Total votes		101,518	100%

== Candidates ==
- Byron G. Allen, former secretary of the Iowa Senate (DFL)
- Edward John Thye, incumbent (Republican)
- Gerald Mason York (Industrial Government)

== Campaign ==
Thye gave a radio address in July of 1944 over KTSP in which he spoke of creating programs to guarantee jobs to returning soldiers after assumed victory in World War II. Thye devoted his campaign, and active administration, to post-war planning. His plan was to "give every possible encouragement to private industry, and to supplement private employment through a well-planned public construction program." He stated that the state was in its best financial situation in twenty years, with low debts and high income. Thye had ambitious plans for highway construction, amounting to a worth of $26,000,000.

Allen ran as a liberal, running on a more moderate platform than the Farmer-Labor party had in previous elections, what was called "progressive but not radical". He made clear he believed conservatives had no place in the DFL. His strategy was to ensure the DFL fell in line with him and his campaign manager Hubert Humphrey, and once the party was united behind them, victory over the Republicans would follow. Allen was a supporter of Franklin D. Roosevelt, referred to Republican concerns over Roosevelt's long term a "phony issue", and brought attention to Harold Knutson, a Republican member of congress who had served for 26 years, compared to Roosevelt's twelve.

== Results ==
1944 gubernatorial election, Minnesota
Party	Candidate	Votes	%	±%
Republican	Edward John Thye (incumbent)	701,185	61.59%	+9.99%
Democratic (DFL)	Byron G. Allen	430,132	37.78%	−9.44%
Industrial Government	Gerald M. York	7,151	0.63%	+0.09%
Majority		271,053	23.81%	
Turnout		1,138,468		
Republican hold		Swing		

== See also ==
- List of Minnesota gubernatorial elections
