= William E. Carlson =

American politician, educator, and businessman

William Carlson
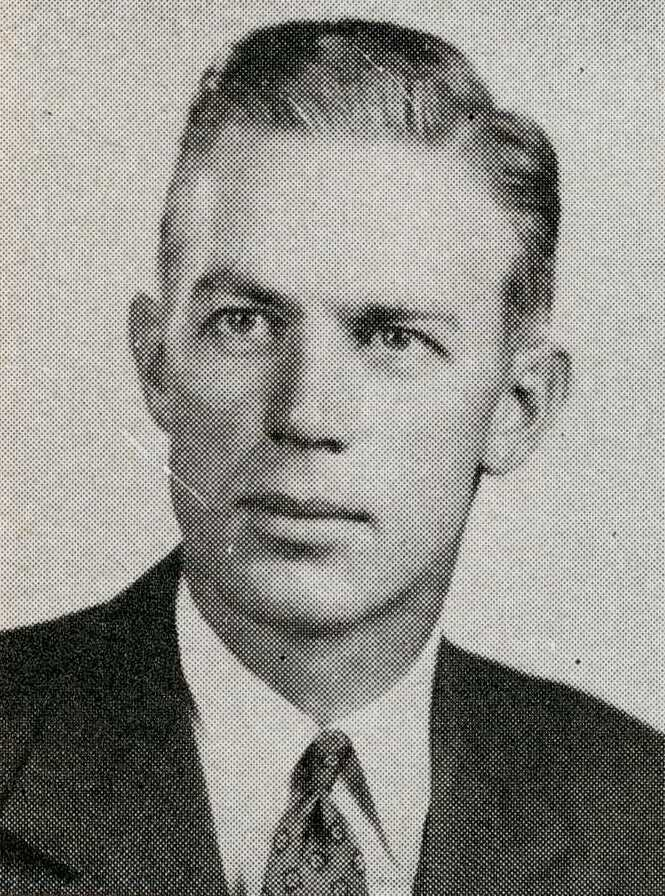

Member of the Minnesota House of Representatives from the 41st District
- In office January 4, 1953 – January 6, 1947
- Governor: Luther Youngdahl; C. Elmer Anderson

Personal details
- Born: August 30, 1912 Saint Paul, Minnesota, U.S.
- Died: March 13, 1999 (aged 86) Saint Paul, Minnesota, U.S.
- Resting place: Resurrection Cemetery; Mendota Heights, Minnesota, U.S.
- Education: Harvard University; University of St. Thomas

Military service
- Allegiance: United States
- Branch/service: United States Navy
- Battles/wars: World War II

William E. Carlson (August 30, 1912 – March 13, 1999) was an American politician, educator, and businessman.

== Biography ==
Carlson was born in Saint Paul, Minnesota. He served in the United States Navy during World War II. He graduated from University of St. Thomas and was in the insurance business. He went to Harvard University for two months in 1942 and took a communications course. Carlson taught English literature at the University of St. Thomas. Carlson served in the Minnesota House of Representatives from 1947 to 1952 and was a Democrat. In 1952, Carlson ran for the United States Senate seat from Minnesota and lost the election to Edward Thye, the Republican candidate. Carlson served on the Ramsey County, Minnesota Commission 1957 to 1962. He then served on the Saint Paul City Council from 1966 to 1971 and as Ramsey County Assessor from 1971 to 1977. He died of a heart attack at his home in Saint Paul, Minnesota at age 86.

== Notes ==
Party political offices
Preceded by Theodore Jorgenson	Democratic nominee for U.S. Senator from Minnesota (Class 1); 1952	Succeeded by Eugene McCarthy
