= James W. Nichols =

American politician (born 1946)

Jim Nichols

Commissioner of the Minnesota Department of Agriculture
- In office 1982–1990
- Governor: Albert Harold Quie; Rudy Perpich

Member of the Minnesota Senate
- In office 1977–1981

Personal details
- Born: James Nichols; June 19, 1946 (age 80)
- Party: Democratic
- Education: University of Minnesota Morris (BS)

James W. Nichols (born June 19, 1946) is an American farmer and politician.

== Career ==
Nichols lives in Lake Benton, Lincoln County, Minnesota and is a farmer. He received his bachelor's degree from the University of Minnesota Morris. Nichols served in the Minnesota Senate from 1977 to 1981 and was a Democrat. He then served as the commissioner of the Minnesota Department of Agriculture from 1982 to 1990.
