= 1958 United States Senate election in Minnesota =

- November 4, 1958
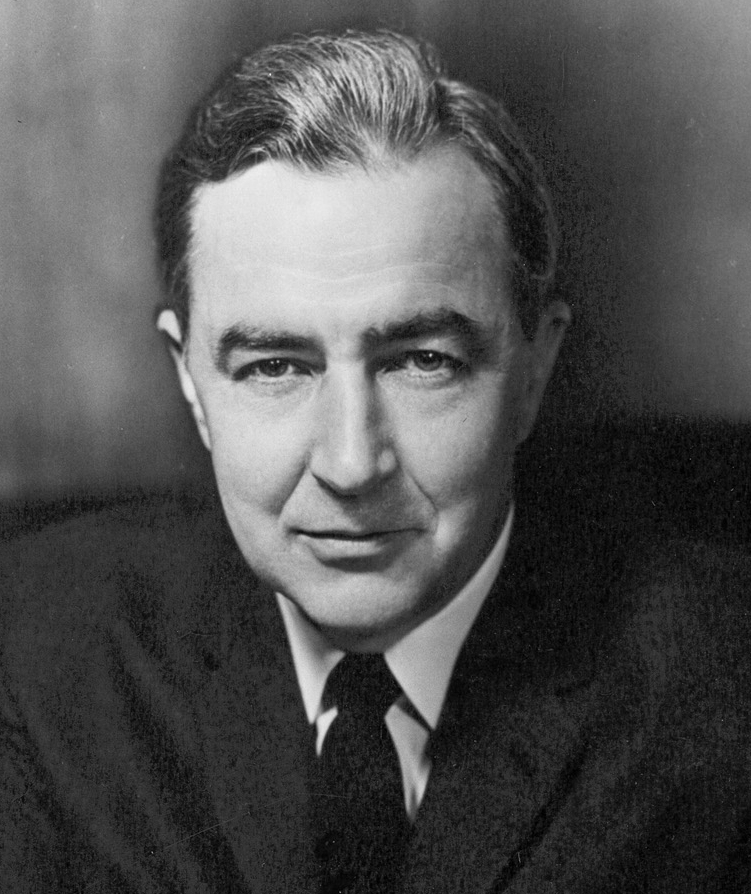

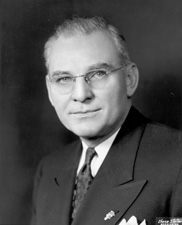
Nominee	Eugene J. McCarthy	Edward John Thye
Party	Democratic (DFL)	Republican
Popular vote	608,847	535,629
Percentage	52.95%	46.58%
- County results McCarthy: 50–60% 60–70% 70–80% Thye: 50–60% 60–70%
U.S. senator before election
Edward John Thye
Republican
Elected U.S. Senator
Eugene J. McCarthy
Democratic (DFL)

The 1958 United States Senate election in Minnesota took place on November 4, 1958. Democratic U.S. Representative Eugene McCarthy defeated incumbent Republican U.S. Senator Edward John Thye, who sought a third term. With his victory, McCarthy became the first Democrat ever to be popularly elected to Minnesota's Class 1 Senate seat, and marked the first time since 1859 that Democrats held both Senate seats in the state.

== Democratic–Farmer-Labor primary ==
Eugene McCarthy was nominated. Governor Orville Freeman was considered as a candidate for U.S. Senate. Freeman said there was a 'superabundance of good candidates' and refused to run. McCarthy announced his candidacy within a day of Freeman's decline. Karl Rolvaag and Miles Lord were considered as potential candidates.

- Eugene J. McCarthy, U.S. Representative from Minnesota's 4th congressional district since 1949
- Hans R. Miller
- Hjalmar Petersen, 23rd Governor of Minnesota (1936–1937) and 28th Lieutenant Governor of Minnesota (1935–1936)

Results by county: McCarthy: 40–50%; 50–60%; 60–70%; 70–80%; 80–90%; Petersen: 40–50%; 50–60%

Democratic primary election results
Party	Candidate	Votes	%
Democratic (DFL)	Eugene J. McCarthy	279,796	75.65%
Democratic (DFL)	Hjalmar Petersen	76,340	20.64%
Democratic (DFL)	Hans R. Miller	13,736	3.71%
Total votes		369,872	100.00%

== Republican primary ==
- Mrs. Peder P. Schmidt
- Edward C. Slettedahl
- Edward John Thye, Incumbent U.S. Senator since 1947

Republican primary election results
Party	Candidate	Votes	%
Republican	Edward John Thye (incumbent)	224,833	91.81%
Republican	Edward C. Slettedahl	13,734	5.61%
Republican	Mrs. Peder P. Schmidt	6,332	2.58%
Total votes		244,899	100.00%

== General election ==
General election results
Party	Candidate	Votes	%
Democratic (DFL)	Eugene J. McCarthy	608,847	52.95%
Republican	Edward John Thye (incumbent)	535,629	46.58%
Socialist Workers	William M. Curran	5,407	0.47%
Total votes		1,149,883	100.00%
Democratic (DFL) gain from Republican			

== See also ==
- 1958 United States Senate elections
