= 1952 United States Senate election in Minnesota =

- November 4, 1952
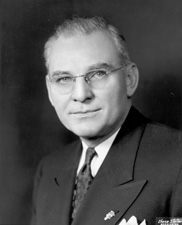

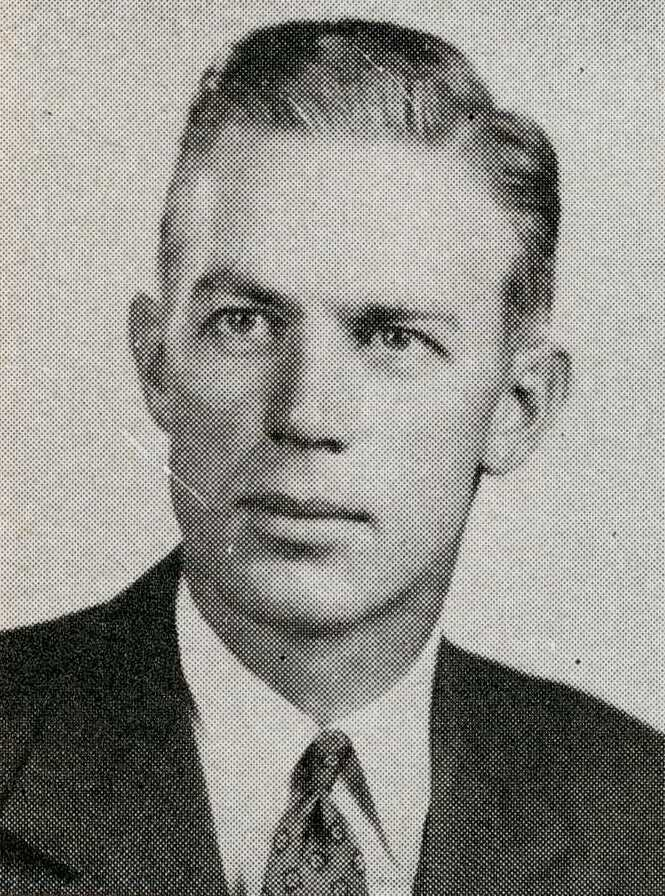
| Nominee | Edward J. Thye | Bill Carlson |
| Party | Republican | Democratic (DFL) |
| Popular vote | 785,649 | 590,011 |
| Percentage | 56.63% | 42.53% |
- County results Thye: 40–50% 50–60% 60–70% 70–80% 80–90% Carlson: 50–60% 60–70%
U.S. senator before election
Edward J. Thye
Republican
Elected U.S. Senator
Edward J. Thye
Republican

The 1952 United States Senate election in Minnesota took place on November 4, 1952. Incumbent Republican Edward John Thye defeated Democratic challenger Bill Carlson to win a second term.

== Democratic–Farmer–Labor primary ==
=== Candidates ===
==== Declared ====
- William E. (Bill) Carlson
- John A. McDonough
- F. H. Shoemaker

=== Results ===
Democratic primary election results
| Party | Candidate | Votes | % |
|---|---|---|---|
| Democratic (DFL) | William E. (Bill) Carlson | 126,426 | 54.37% |
| Democratic (DFL) | John A. McDonough | 64,094 | 27.56% |
| Democratic (DFL) | F. H. Shoemaker | 42,029 | 18.07% |
| Total votes | | 232,549 | 100.00% |

== Republican primary ==
=== Candidates ===
==== Declared ====
- John M. Arneson
- A. B. Gilbert
- Arthur D. Russell
- Edward C. Slettedahl
- Edward J. Thye, Incumbent U.S. Senator since 1947

=== Results ===
Republican primary election results
| Party | Candidate | Votes | % |
|---|---|---|---|
| Republican | Edward J. Thye (Incumbent) | 321,659 | 84.84% |
| Republican | Edward C. Slettedahl | 23,427 | 6.18% |
| Republican | John M. Arneson | 13,653 | 3.60% |
| Republican | Arthur D. Russell | 11,221 | 2.96% |
| Republican | A. B. Gilbert | 9,191 | 2.42% |
| Total votes | | 379,151 | 100.00% |

== General election ==
=== Results ===
General election results
| Party | Candidate | Votes | % |
|---|---|---|---|
| Republican | Edward John Thye (Incumbent) | 785,649 | 56.63% |
| Democratic (DFL) | William E. (Bill) Carlson | 590,011 | 42.53% |
| Progressive | Marian Le Sueur | 7,917 | 0.57% |
| Socialist Workers | Vincent R. Dunne | 3,842 | 0.28% |
| Total votes | | 1,387,419 | 100.00% |
| Majority | | 195,638 | 14.10% |
| Republican hold | | | |

== See also ==
- United States Senate elections, 1952
