= Minnesota Japanese School =

Coordinates: 44.873249°N 93.268512°W

- Japanese: ミネソタ日本語補習授業校

Information
- Established: 1978; 48 years ago
- Enrollment: 91 (1987)
- Language: Japanese
- Website: https://www.mnjs.org/english

The Minnesota Japanese School (MNJS; ミネソタ日本語補習授業校 Minnesota Nihongo Hoshū Jugyō Kō) is a supplementary Japanese school for the children of Japanese citizens residing in Minnesota. The school was founded in 1978 and offers pre-k to high school classes. Classes are held on Saturdays on the campus of Valley View Middle School, located in Edina, Minnesota, just south of Minneapolis.

The Minnesota Japanese School is recognized by the Japanese government Ministry of Education, Culture, Sports, Science and Technology (MEXT) as teaching a curriculum equivalent to that of schools in Japan for children of similar age.

== History ==
It was founded in 1978, with classes first held in St. Louis Park. It was formerly held at the Anoka-Ramsey Community College in Coon Rapids, with the school using a total of eleven of that campus's classrooms. Later classes were held at Normandale Community College in Bloomington and then moved to Hope Church in Richfield

Initially, the school only catered to pupils who were going to go back to Japan, but later the school began catering to permanent residents of the United States.

== Curriculum ==
The school focuses on Japanese language and mathematics. In the 1980s Japanese students perceived the school as having more intense coursework, lasting into the summer, compared to the American day schools they attended.

== Student body ==
In 1987 the school had 91 students. Some students lived in Rochester and Willmar. A total of 53 families enrolled their children that year.

== See also ==
- Japanese language education in the United States
