= 1922 United States Senate election in Minnesota =

- November 7, 1922
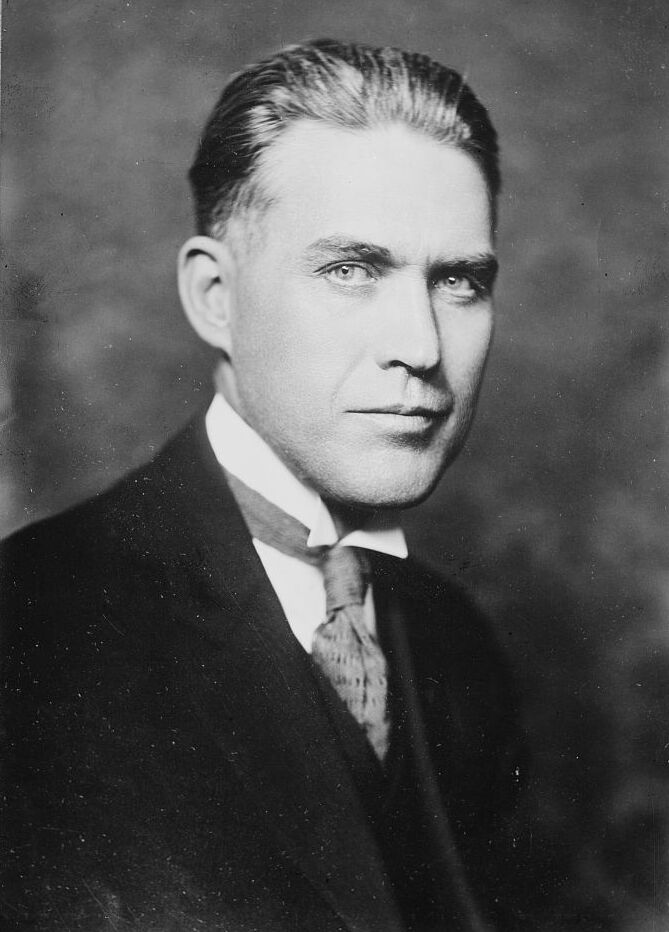

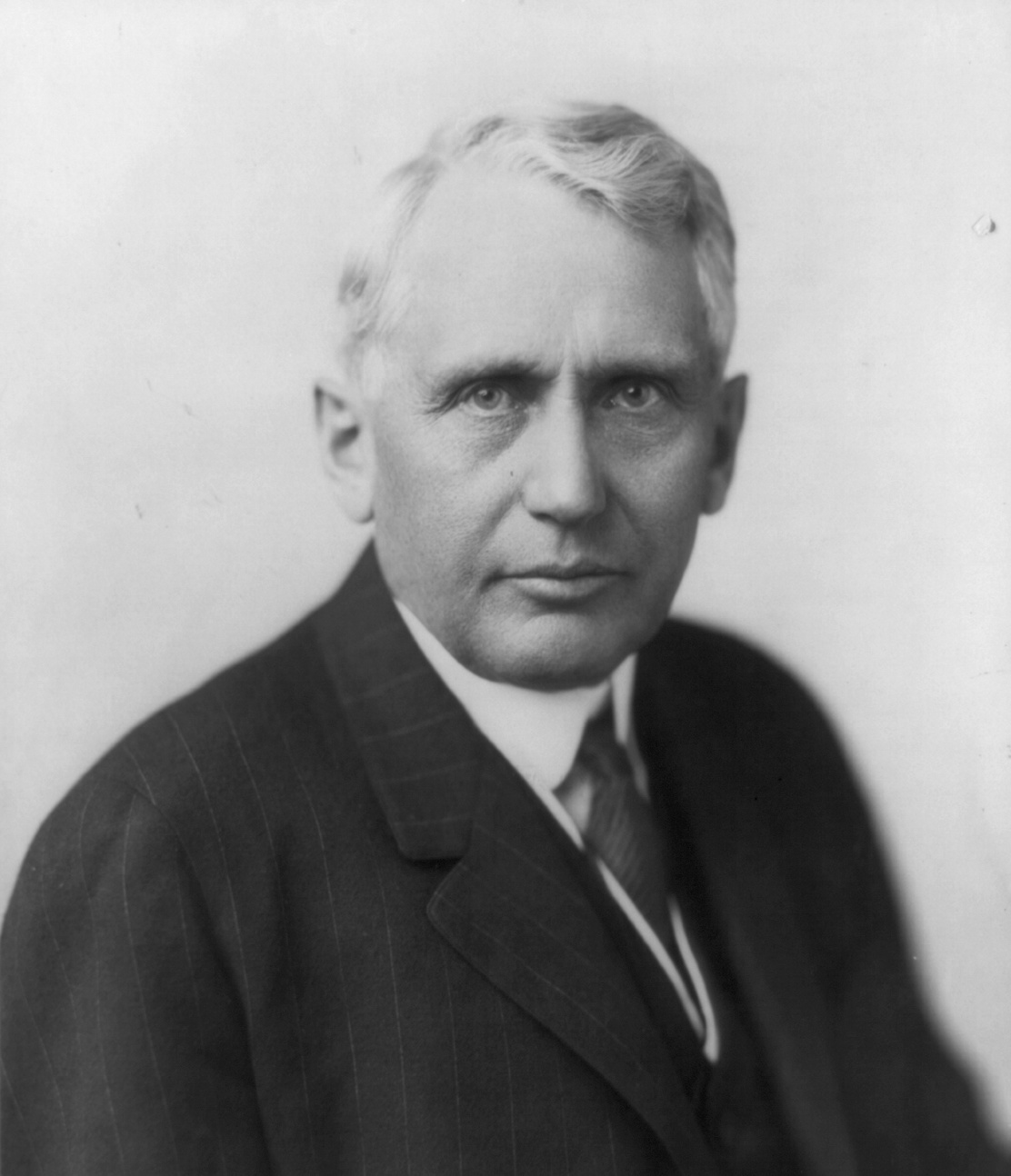

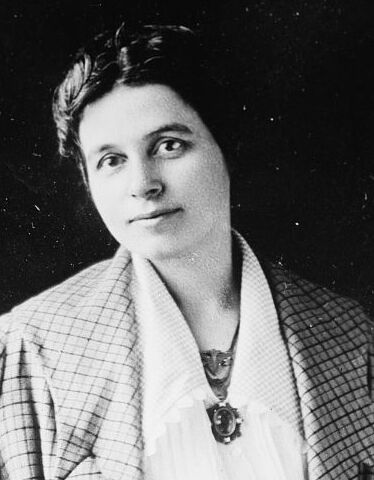
Nominee	Henrik Shipstead	Frank B. Kellogg	Anna D. Olesen
Party	Farmer–Labor	Republican	Democratic
Popular vote	325,372	241,833	123,624
Percentage	47.10%	35.01%	17.89%
- County results Shipstead: 30–40% 40–50% 50–60% 60–70% 70–80% Kellogg: 30–40% 40–50% 50–60% Olesen: 40–50%
U.S. senator before election
Frank B. Kellogg
Republican
Elected U.S. Senator
Henrik Shipstead
Farmer–Labor

The 1922 United States Senate election in Minnesota took place on November 7, 1922. Farmer–Labor challenger Henrik Shipstead defeated incumbent Republican U.S. Senator Frank B. Kellogg and Democratic challenger Anna Dickie Olesen.

The 1922 U.S. Senate election in Minnesota was significant for a number of reasons. Olesen was the first woman nominated by a major political party in an election to the United States Senate. She was furthermore the first woman nominated by the Minnesota Democratic Party in any statewide election, and, together with the 1922 Farmer–Labor nominees for Secretary of State and State Auditor, Susie Stageberg and Eliza Evans Deming, tied for the record for second woman nominated by a major political party in a statewide election in Minnesota (the first being the 1920 Farmer–Labor nominee for Secretary of State, Lily J. Anderson). In addition to being the first United States Senate election to feature a woman as the nominee of a major party, the 1922 United States Senate election in Minnesota was the first United States Senate election held in Minnesota after the ratification of the Nineteenth Amendment to the United States Constitution.

The victorious Henrik Shipstead also earned some footnotes in history. Shipstead was the first Farmer–Labor nominee to ever win a statewide election in Minnesota. He was also just the fourth non-Republican to represent Minnesota in the United States Senate, the third non-Republican to be elected to the United States Senate from Minnesota, the first elected non-Republican to have held a United States Senate seat from Minnesota since the American Civil War, and the first non-Republican to be elected to the United States Senate from Minnesota by popular vote.

Additionally, in the 1922 United States Senate election in Minnesota, Kellogg became the first Republican incumbent representing Minnesota in the United States Senate to ever be defeated, in a bid for re-election, by a non-Republican.

== Democratic primary ==
=== Candidates ===
==== Declared ====
- Thomas J. Meighen, resident of Preston, People's nominee for the 1st CD in 1894, Democratic-People's nominee for Lieutenant Governor in 1900, People's nominee for Governor in 1902, Democratic nominee for Auditor in 1910, Farmer-Labor nominee for Treasurer in 1926
- Homer Morris, Minneapolis attorney
- Anna D. Olesen, Democratic National Committee member since 1917, resident of Cloquet, former vice-president of the Minnesota State Federated Women's Clubs, the first woman candidate and nominee for the U.S. Senate in Minnesota history

=== Results ===
Democratic primary election results
Party	Candidate	Votes	%
Democratic	Anna D. Olesen	28,745	47.68%
Democratic	Thomas J. Meighen	19,941	33.08%
Democratic	Homer Morris	11,596	19.24%
Total votes		60,282	100.00%

== Republican primary ==
=== Candidates ===
==== Declared ====
- Frank B. Kellogg, Incumbent U.S. Senator since 1917
- Ernest Lundeen, Former U.S. Representative from Minnesota's 5th congressional district (1917–1919)
- Richard E. Titus, Minneapolis attorney, author, and prohibitionist

Republican primary election results
Party	Candidate	Votes	%
Republican	Frank B. Kellogg (Incumbent)	216,816	58.76%
Republican	Ernest Lundeen	123,765	33.54%
Republican	Richard E. Titus	28,399	7.70%
Total votes		368,980	100.00%

== General election ==
=== Results ===
Senator Frank Kellogg became the fourth Minnesota U.S. Senator to lose reelection joining Democrat James Shields in 1859, Democrat Charles Towne in 1901, and Republican Moses Clapp in 1916.

General election results
Party	Candidate	Votes	%
Farmer–Labor	Henrik Shipstead	325,372	47.10%
Republican	Frank B. Kellogg (Incumbent)	241,833	35.01%
Democratic	Anna D. Olesen	123,624	17.89%
Total votes		690,829	100.00%
Majority		83,539	12.09%
Farmer–Labor gain from Republican			

== See also ==
- United States Senate elections, 1922 and 1923
