= Shipstead-Luce Act =

- Long title: An Act to regulate the height, exterior design, and construction of private and semipublic buildings in certain areas of the National Capital
- Enacted by: the 71st United States Congress
- Effective: May 16, 1930

Citations
- Public law: Pub. L. 71-231
- Statutes at Large: 46 Stat. 366 (1930)

Codification
- Acts amended: Act of May 16, 1910, An Act Establishing a Commission of Fine Arts

Legislative history
- Introduced in the Senate as S. 2400 by Sen. Henrik Shipstead (FL-MN) on December 19, 1929; Signed into law by President Herbert Hoover on May 16, 1930

Major amendments
- An Act to include Lafayette Park within the provisions of the Act entitled "An Act to regulate the height, exterior design, and construction of private and semipublic buildings in certain areas of the National Capital" (Pub. L. 76-248, 53 Stat. 1144; approved July 31, 1939)

The Shipstead-Luce Act (Pub. L. 71–231, 46 Stat. 366, enacted May 16, 1930, codified at 40 U.S.C. § 9101), is an American statute which extended the authority of the United States Commission of Fine Arts (CFA) as a statutory independent agency within the United States federal government and allowed it to regulate the height, exterior design, and construction of private and semi-public buildings in parts of the District of Columbia.

== Genesis of the act ==
At the establishment of the District of Columbia, President George Washington granted the government of the District the power to regulate architectural design and urban planning. These powers were suspended by President James Monroe in 1822.

In 1900, the United States Congress created the Senate Park Commission (also known as the "McMillan Commission" for its sponsor, Senator James McMillan (R-MI)) to reconcile competing visions for the development of Washington, D.C. and especially the monumental core, including the National Mall and nearby areas, and the city's parks and parkways. The commission's plan for development of the city, popularly known as the McMillan Plan, proposed the razing of all residences and other buildings on Lafayette Square and building Neoclassical government office buildings around the park to house executive branch offices. It also proposed clearing large spaces north and south of the National Mall, realigning some streets, and constructing large museums and public buildings along the Mall's length. The commission also proposed significant expansion of the district's park system, the creation of a system of parkways, and major renovation and beautification of existing parks. Over the next few years, the President and Congress established several new agencies to supervise the design, approval, and construction of new buildings in the District of Columbia to carry out the McMillan Plan: The Commission of Fine Arts in 1910 to review and advise on the design of new structures, the Public Buildings Commission in 1916 to make recommendations regarding the construction of buildings to house federal agencies and offices, and the National Capital Parks and Planning Commission in 1924 to oversee planning for the District.

The 1910 legislation establishing the CFA gave the commission the power only to provide advice on the siting of statues, fountains, and monuments. In October 1910, President William Howard Taft issued Executive Order 1259 (October 25, 1910), which required that all new government buildings erected in the District of Columbia be reviewed by the CFA as well. On November 28, 1913, President Woodrow Wilson issued Executive Order 1862, which expanded the CFA's advisory authority to cover any "new structures...which affect in any important way the appearance of the City, or whenever questions involving matters of art and with which the federal government is concerned..." Executive Order 3524, issued by President Warren G. Harding on July 28, 1921, further expanded the CFA's review to the design of coins, fountains, insignia, medals, monuments, parks, and statues, whether constructed or issued by the federal government or the government of the District of Columbia.

By 1920, little land had been acquired by the federal government to carry out the McMillan plan. In 1924, Frederic Adrian Delano and the Committee of 100 on the Federal City conducted a survey of the rapidly growing city, which documented powerfully the threat development posed to the McMillan plan. The newly created National Capital Parks and Planning Commission subsequently issued a study in 1928 that outlined a plan of action for implementing the McMillan plan.

It quickly became apparent to federal agencies and members of Congress, however, that the federal government had to restore control over architectural design and development in areas adjacent to the sites proposed for parks and buildings in the McMillan plan. Without this regulatory control, unsuitable development would quickly render the National Mall, city parks, and other areas useless for the purposes envisioned by the Senate Park Commission.

== Authority granted by the act ==
In 1930, Congress passed the Shipstead-Luce Act, co-sponsored by Senator Henrik Shipstead (FL-MN) and Representative Robert Luce (R-MA), which amended the 1910 legislation establishing the Commission of Fine Arts. The Shipstead-Luce Act gave the CFA statutory authority not merely to review but also approve plans for the height, appearance, and color and texture of materials for exterior construction of any building, public or private, erected in the District of Columbia. The CFA's authority, however, extended only to structures which fronted on or abutted the grounds of the United States Capitol, the grounds of the White House, Pennsylvania Avenue, NW, extending from the Capitol to the White House, Rock Creek Park, the National Zoological Park, the Rock Creek and Potomac Parkway, West Potomac Park, and the National Mall and its constituent parks. Included in the "Shipstead-Luce boundary" were structures which abutted any street bordering this area. The Shipstead-Luce Act required the CFA to approve or disapprove any plans submitted to it within 30 days, after which the plan was assumed approved.

The Shipstead-Luce Act was amended on July 31, 1939, so that the Shipstead-Luce boundary now included private or semipublic buildings within or abutting Lafayette Square.

== Bibliography ==
- Bednar, Michael J. L'Enfant's Legacy: Public Open Spaces in Washington. Baltimore, Md.: Johns Hopkins University Press, 2006.
- Cannadine, David. Mellon: An American Life. Reprint ed. New York: Random House, Inc., 2008.
- Davis, Timothy. "Beyond the Mall: The Senate Park Commission's Plans for Washington's Park System." In Sue A. Kohler and Pamela Scott, eds. Designing the Nation's Capital: The 1901 Plan for Washington, D.C. Washington, D.C.: U.S. Commission of Fine Arts, 2006.
- Gutheim, Frederick Albert and Lee, Antoinette Josephine. Worthy of the Nation: Washington, DC, From L'Enfant to the National Capital Planning Commission. 2d ed. Baltimore: Johns Hopkins University Press, 2006.
- Kohler, Sue A. The Commission of Fine Arts: A Brief History, 1910-1995. Washington, D.C.: United States Commission of Fine Arts, 1996.
- Luebke, Thomas E., ed. "Civic Art: A Centennial History of the U.S. Commission of Fine Arts" (Washington, D.C.: U.S. Commission of Fine Arts, 2013).
- Peterson, Jon A. The Birth of City Planning in the United States, 1840–1917. Baltimore: Johns Hopkins University Press, 2003.
- Resnik, Judith and Curtis, Dennis E. Representing Justice: Invention, Controversy, and Rights in City-States and Democratic Courtrooms. New Haven: Yale University Press, 2011.
