= 1942 Minnesota lieutenant gubernatorial election =

Minnesota lieutenant gubernatorial election, 1942
- November 3, 1942
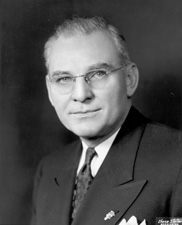

Nominee	Edward John Thye	Juls J. Anderson	Joseph Kowalkowski
Party	Republican	Farmer–Labor	Democratic
Popular vote	417,008	250,410	81,911
Percentage	55.65%	33.42%	10.93%
Lieutenant Governor before election
C. Elmer Anderson
Republican
Elected Lieutenant Governor
Edward John Thye
Republican

The 1942 Minnesota lieutenant gubernatorial election took place on November 3, 1942. Republican Party of Minnesota candidate Edward John Thye defeated Minnesota Farmer–Labor Party challenger Juls J. Anderson and Minnesota Democratic Party candidate Joseph Kowalkowski.

== Results ==
1942 Lieutenant Gubernatorial Election, Minnesota
Party	Candidate	Votes	%	±%
Republican	Edward John Thye	417,008	55.65%	+4.49%
Farmer–Labor	Juls J. Anderson	250,410	33.42%	+7.31%
Democratic	Joseph Kowalkowski	81,911	10.93%	−11.80%
None	C. Elmer Anderson (incumbent)	18	0.00%	n/a
Majority		166,598	22.23%	
Turnout		749,347		
Republican hold		Swing		
