= Robert Luce =

American politician (1862-1946)

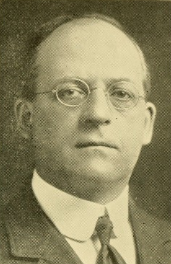

Member of the U.S. House of Representatives from Massachusetts
- In office March 4, 1919 – January 3, 1935
- Preceded by: William Henry Carter
- Succeeded by: Richard M. Russell
- Constituency: 13th district (1919–33); 9th district (1933–35)
- In office January 3, 1937 – January 3, 1941
- Preceded by: Richard M. Russell
- Succeeded by: Thomas H. Eliot
- Constituency: 9th district

42nd Lieutenant Governor of Massachusetts
- In office 1912–1913
- Governor: Eugene Foss
- Preceded by: Louis A. Frothingham
- Succeeded by: David I. Walsh

Member of the Massachusetts House of Representatives
- In office 1899; 1901-1908

Personal details
- Born: December 2, 1862 Auburn, Maine, U.S.
- Died: April 7, 1946 (aged 83) Waltham, Massachusetts, U.S.
- Party: Republican
- Education: Harvard University

Robert Luce (December 2, 1862 – April 7, 1946) was a United States representative from Massachusetts.

== Biography ==
Born in Auburn, Maine, Luce attended the public schools of Auburn and Lewiston, Maine, and Somerville, Massachusetts. He graduated from Harvard University in 1882, then taught at Waltham High School for a year.

He engaged in journalism, founding and serving as president of the Luce's Press Clipping Bureau in Boston and New York City. He was elected a member of the Massachusetts House of Representatives in 1899 and 1901–1908. He studied law and was admitted to the bar, but did not engage in extensive practice. He served as president of the Republican State Convention in 1910. He was elected the 42nd lieutenant governor of Massachusetts in 1912. He was a member of the Massachusetts Teachers Retirement Board. He was a delegate to the State constitutional convention 1917–1919, and served as president of the Republican Club of Massachusetts in 1918. He was Regent of the Smithsonian Institution, and was an author, notably on the subject of political science.

Luce was elected as a Republican to the Sixty-sixth and the seven succeeding Congresses (March 4, 1919 – January 3, 1935). He served as chairman of the Committee on Elections No. 2 (Sixty-seventh Congress), and the Committee on World War Veterans’ Legislation (Sixty-eighth Congress). Along with Senator Henrik Shipstead of Minnesota, he introduced the bill that became the Shipstead-Luce Act, which expanded the oversight of the United States Commission of Fine Arts to review of new structures on private property abutting federal land.

Luce was an unsuccessful candidate for reelection in 1934 to the Seventy-fourth Congress, but was elected to the Seventy-fifth and Seventy-sixth Congresses (January 3, 1937 – January 3, 1941). He was again an unsuccessful candidate for reelection in 1940 to the Seventy-seventh Congress. Luce resumed his former business pursuits, and died in Waltham on April 7, 1946. He was interred in Mount Auburn Cemetery in Cambridge.

For many years Luce owned the Walter S. and Melissa E. Barnes House in Somerville.

Party political offices
Preceded by Louis A. Frothingham	Republican nominee for Lieutenant Governor of Massachusetts; 1911, 1912	Succeeded by August H. Goetting
Political offices
Preceded by Louis A. Frothingham	Lieutenant Governor of Massachusetts; 1912–1913	Succeeded by David I. Walsh
U.S. House of Representatives
Preceded by William H. Carter	Member of the U.S. House of Representatives from Massachusetts's 13th congressional district March 4, 1919 – March 3, 1933	Succeeded by Richard B. Wigglesworth
Preceded by Charles L. Underhill	Member of the U.S. House of Representatives from Massachusetts's 9th congressional district March 4, 1933 – January 3, 1935	Succeeded by Richard M. Russell
Preceded by Richard M. Russell	Member of the U.S. House of Representatives from Massachusetts's 9th congressional district January 3, 1937 – January 3, 1941	Succeeded by Thomas H. Eliot
