= Thomas E. Petersen =

American politician, lobbyist and farmer (born 1966)

Thom Petersen
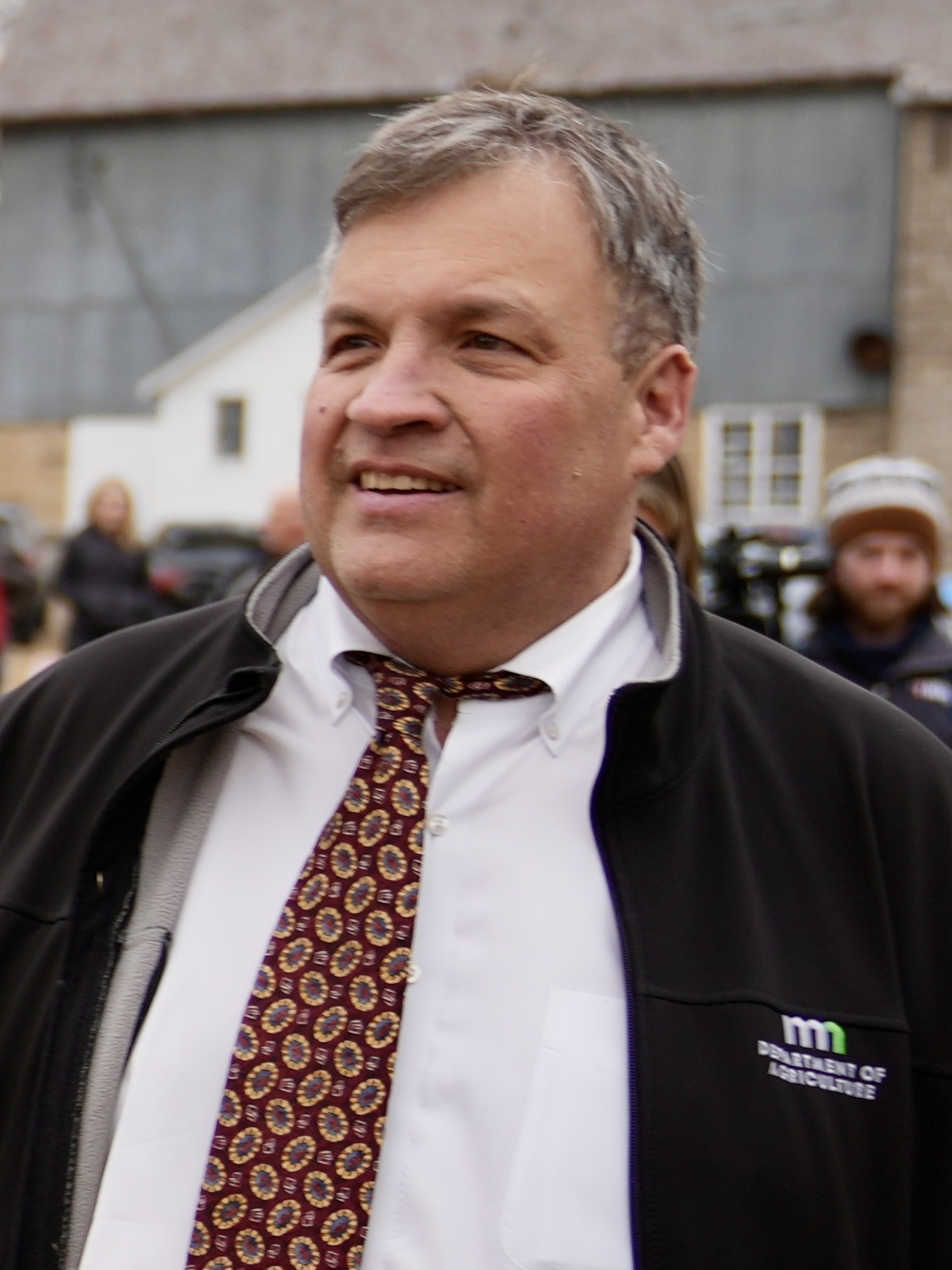

Agriculture Commissioner of Minnesota
- Incumbent
- Assumed office January 7, 2019
- Governor: Tim Walz
- Preceded by: David Frederickson

Personal details
- Born: Thomas Petersen; January 23, 1966 (age 60) Pine City, Minnesota, U.S.
- Party: Democratic
- Children: 2
- Education: Normandale Community College (AA); University of Minnesota (attended); University of Georgia (attended)

Thomas E. "Thom" Petersen (born 1966) is an American politician, lobbyist, and farmer serving as commissioner of the Minnesota Department of Agriculture. Petersen was appointed to the position by Governor Tim Walz in January 2019, succeeding David Frederickson.

== Education ==
Petersen earned an Associate degree from Normandale Community College and took courses at the University of Minnesota and University of Georgia.

== Career ==
Petersen owns and operates a farming business. For 15 years, he worked as the director of government relations at the Minnesota Farmers Union, in which he was tasked with lobbying members of the United States Congress and Minnesota Legislature.

== Personal life ==
Petersen was born January 23, 1966. He lives with his wife and two sons in Pine City, Minnesota.He raises and shows tiny horses from his ranch, Petersen’s Pony Ponderosa.
