= Walter S. and Melissa E. Barnes House =

Historic house in Massachusetts, United States

- U.S. National Register of Historic Places
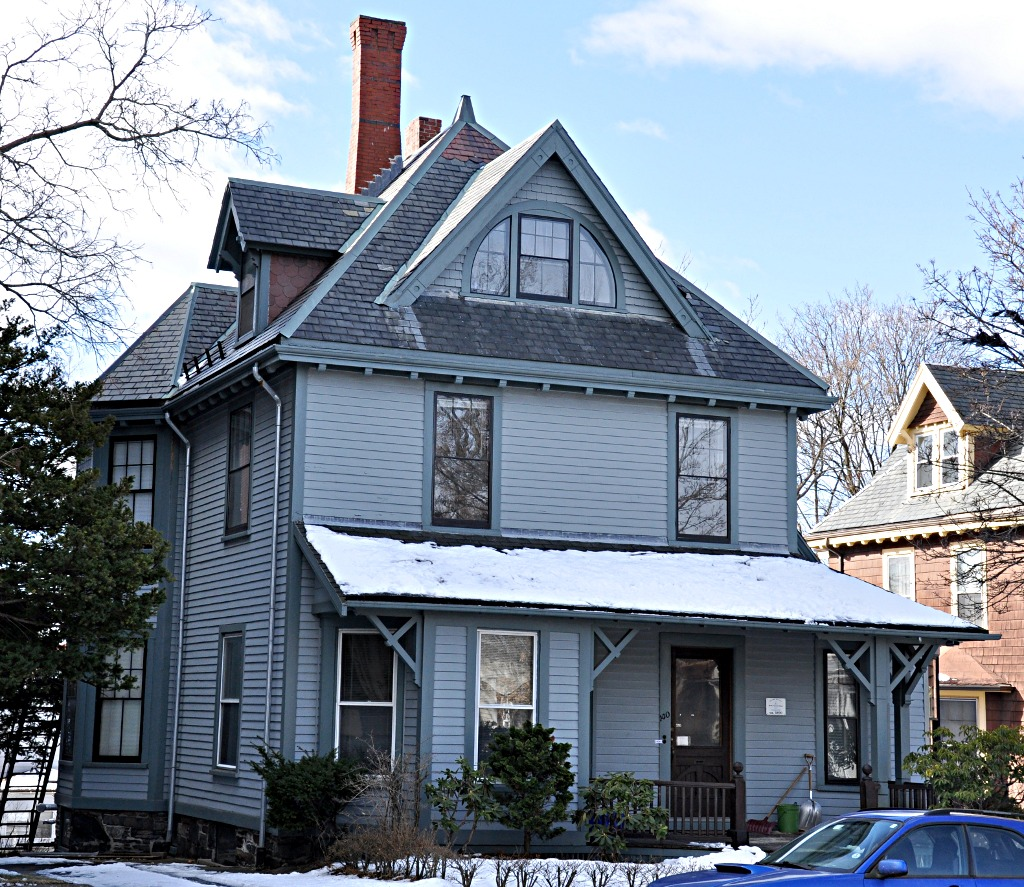

- Location within Massachusetts Location within the United States
- Location: 140 Highland Ave., Somerville, Massachusetts
- Coordinates: 42°23′16.51″N 71°6′9.11″W
- Area: less than one acre
- Built: 1885
- Architectural style: Queen Anne, Shingle Style
- MPS: Somerville MPS
- NRHP reference No.: 89001266
- Added to NRHP: March 8, 1990

The Walter S. and Melissa E. Barnes House is a historic house at 140 Highland Avenue in Somerville, Massachusetts. Built about 1890, it is one of the city's least-altered examples of Queen/Stick style Victorian architecture. It was for many years home to Robert Luce, a one-term Lieutenant Governor of Massachusetts. It was listed on the National Register of Historic Places in 1990.

== Description and history ==
The Barnes House stands in central Somerville, on the south side of Highland Avenue (a major east–west route through the city) between Central Street and Trull Lane. It is a 2 1/2-story wood-frame structure, with a hip roof and clapboarded exterior. The roof faces each have dormers, the one in front extended in width to a triangular shaped, and nearly filled by a half-round window. The main roof eaves are bracketed, and there are Stick-style braces on the square posts supporting the front porch. The porch has a shed roof, and wraps around to the right side to a projecting section.

The house was built sometime between about 1885 and 1895, and is one of a few virtually unchanged Queen Anne/Stick style Victorians in the city. It was built for Walter S. Barnes, who worked in the box-making business in Boston. It was home for many years to the family of Robert Luce (1862–1945), a prominent local politician. Luce, a Republican, served many years in the United States Congress representing Somerville, and served a single term (1912–13) as Lieutenant Governor of Massachusetts.

== See also ==
- National Register of Historic Places listings in Somerville, Massachusetts
- Walter Barnes (sportswriter) (1860–1940), a son of Walter Barnes and Melissa Barnes
