= 1946 United States Senate election in Minnesota =

- November 5, 1946
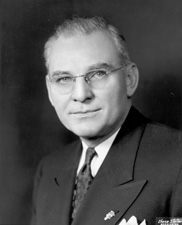

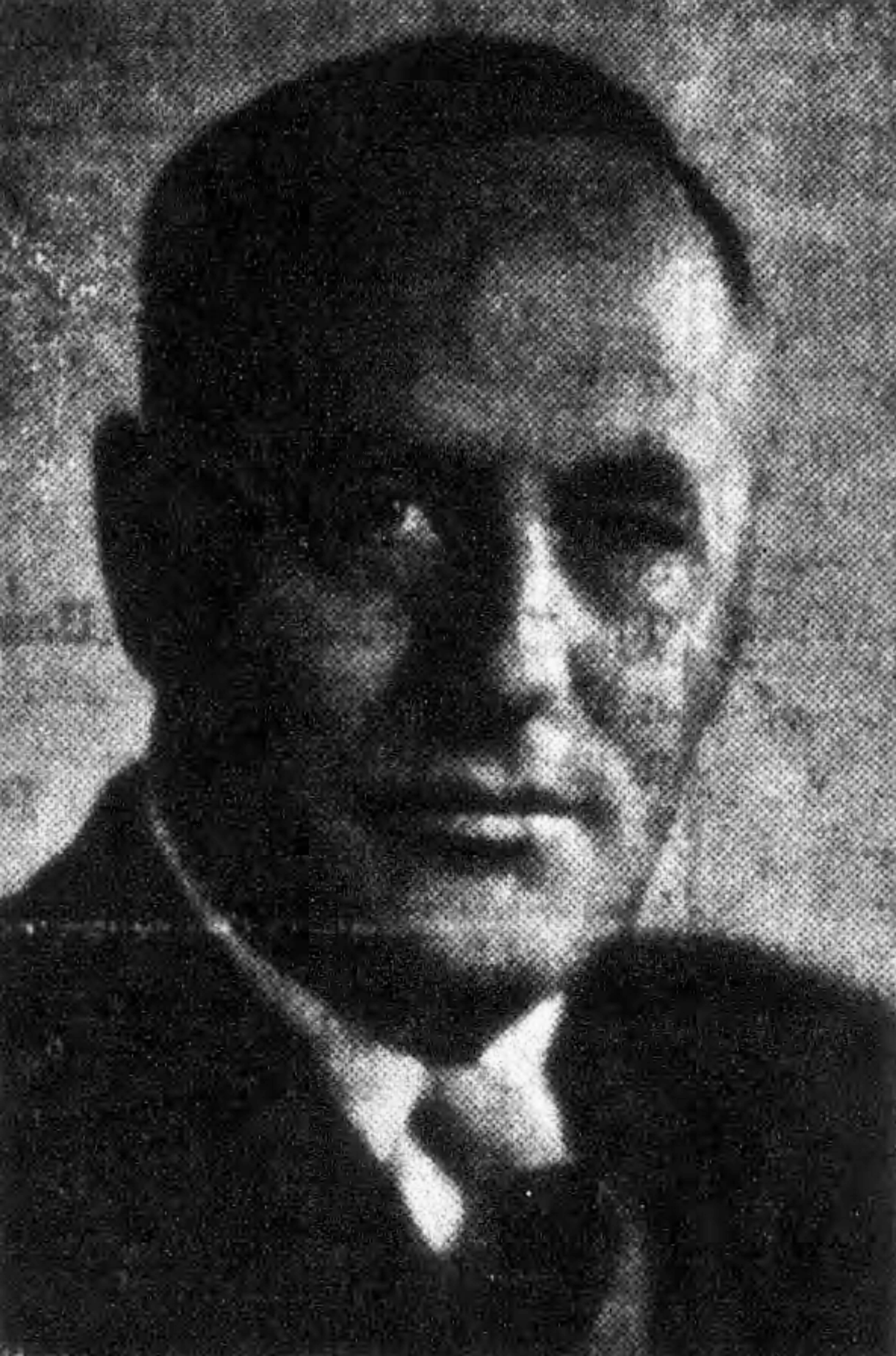
| Nominee | Edward J. Thye | Theodore Jorgenson |
| Party | Republican | Democratic (DFL) |
| Popular vote | 517,775 | 349,520 |
| Percentage | 58.92% | 39.78% |
- County results Thye: 50–60% 60–70% 70–80% 80–90% Jorgenson: 40–50% 50–60% 60–70%
U.S. senator before election
Henrik Shipstead
Republican
Elected U.S. Senator
Edward J. Thye
Republican

The 1946 United States Senate election in Minnesota took place on November 5, 1946. It was the first election to either of Minnesota's seats in the United States Senate held since the Minnesota Democratic Party and the Farmer-Labor Party of Minnesota merged in 1944, to form the Minnesota Democratic-Farmer-Labor Party. Incumbent U.S. Senator Henrik Shipstead was defeated in the Republican primary by Governor Edward John Thye, who went on to defeat DFL challenger Theodore Jorgenson in the general election.

== Democratic–Farmer–Labor primary ==
=== Candidates ===
==== Declared ====
- Victor D. Engstrom
- Theodore Jorgenson
- Frank Patrick Ryan

=== Results ===
Democratic primary election results
| Party | Candidate | Votes | % |
|---|---|---|---|
| Democratic (DFL) | Theodore Jorgenson | 58,047 | 50.41% |
| Democratic (DFL) | Frank Patrick Ryan | 41,278 | 35.85% |
| Democratic (DFL) | Victor D. Engstrom | 15,826 | 13.74% |
| Total votes | | 115,151 | 100.00% |

== Republican primary ==
=== Candidates ===
==== Declared ====
- Carl Krause
- John C. Peterson
- W. F. Schilling
- Henrik Shipstead, Incumbent U.S. Senator since 1923
- Edward J. Thye, Governor of Minnesota since 1943

=== Results ===
Republican primary election results
| Party | Candidate | Votes | % |
|---|---|---|---|
| Republican | Edward J. Thye | 238,210 | 57.28% |
| Republican | Henrik Shipstead (Incumbent) | 160,619 | 38.62% |
| Republican | John C. Peterson | 10,710 | 2.57% |
| Republican | W. F. Schilling | 3,524 | 0.85% |
| Republican | Carl Krause | 2,821 | 0.68% |
| Total votes | | 415,884 | 100.00% |

== General election ==
=== Results ===
General election results
| Party | Candidate | Votes | % |
|---|---|---|---|
| Republican | Edward J. Thye | 517,775 | 58.92% |
| Democratic (DFL) | Theodore Jorgenson | 349,520 | 39.78% |
| Revolutionary Workers | Grace Carlson | 11,421 | 1.30% |
| Independent | Henrik Shipstead (Incumbent) | 15 | 0.00% |
| Total votes | | 878,731 | 100.00% |
| Majority | | 168,255 | 19.14% |
| Republican hold | | | |

== See also ==
- United States Senate elections, 1946 and 1947
