= National Farmers Union (United States) =

Nationwide organization for American farmers

- Abbreviation: NFU
- Formation: 1902; 124 years ago
- Headquarters: Washington, D.C.
- Region served: United States
- President: Rob Larew
- Main organ: Board of Directors
- Website: NFU.org

National Farmers Union (officially Farmers Educational and Cooperative Union of America) is a national federation of state Farmers Union organizations in the United States. The organization was founded in 1902 in Point, Texas, and is headquartered in Washington, D.C. The organization was created to protect and enhance the economic well-being and quality of life for family farmers, ranchers, and their rural communities by promoting legislation and education beneficial to farmers, and developing cooperative buying and selling methods and businesses. NFU advocates for the sustainable production of food, fiber, feed, and fuel. The current president is Rob Larew, and the vice president is Jeff Kippley. Former NFU Presidents have included Roger Johnson, Tom Buis, and David Frederickson.

Today, the National Farmers Union represents more than 200,000 family farms and ranches across the United States. It is organized into chapters in 33 different states. Proposals are often started at the local level before moving up to the state and national levels. Twice a year, leaders of NFU convene in Washington, D.C., to meet with legislators.

== History ==
National Farmers Union was founded in 1902. In the early 1900's, they campaigned for a parcel post system, direct election of senators, and voting rights for women. Their efforts also led to the enactment of the Federal Farm Loan Act, which established twelve Federal Land Banks.

In 1931 the organization established the Farmers Union Central Exchange and in 1936, it promoted the Commodity Exchange Act. In 1934, it absorbed the American Society of Equity. In 1943, NFU campaigned to make school lunches permanent, eventually helping to pass school milk legislation through Congress. In 1945, NFU was a founding member of Cooperative for American Remittances to Europe. 1945 also saw the organization lobby for a refund of the federal gas tax for gasoline used for agricultural purposes.

In 1949, the NFU attempted to help pass the Brannan Plan, which would provide subsidies to farmers, especially those with smaller-than-average operations. All other major farm groups opposed the Brannan Plan, and it failed to pass through Congress.

In 1966, NFU founded Green Thumb (now known as Experience Works), which secures employment for low-income and older workers. When efforts were made to eliminate the United States Department of Agriculture as a cabinet-level agency, NFU was successful in blocking these efforts.

During the 1970s, NFU took part in developing rural health systems and was also included in the World Hunger Action Council. In 1980, the organization contributed to the process of passing a capital gains tax on foreigners who held US farmland.

In 1982, NFU participated in reallocating a portion of the military budget to humanitarian food aid using commodity surpluses from the US. In 1990, the organization pushed for increased regulation and a national standard for organically-produced food. In 2002, NFU was among the leaders of a coalition of 165 farm and consumer groups that helped establish mandatory country-of-origin labeling, which went into effect September 30, 2008.

=== History of diversity, equity, and inclusion ===
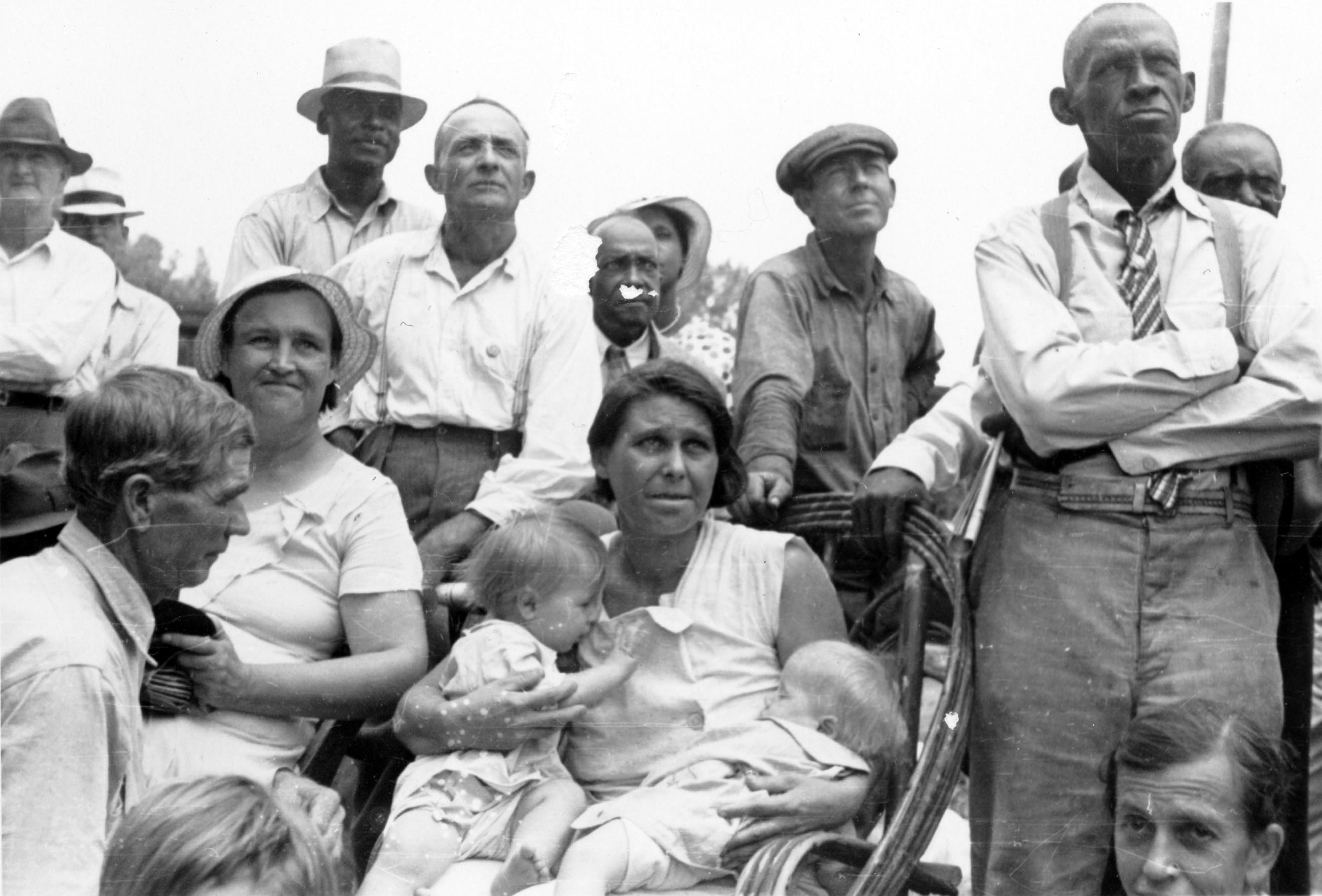
"Men, women and children, Black and White, listen to a speaker at an outdoor Southern Tenant Farmers Union meeting" by Kheel Center, Cornell University Library is licensed under CC BY 2.0.

The Farmers Union has a long history regarding equality and opportunities for women. Unlike many organizations at the time, the Farmers Union did not operate a separate women's auxiliary or distinguish membership of women differently from that of men. In 1908, the Pleasant Valley Union in Rooks County, Kansas, elected Amanda Bates as the first-known woman chapter president, more than a decade before the 19th Amendment to the U.S. Constitution granted women the right to vote. In 1925, the Alabama Farmers Union elected Ida Mathis to be the first female state president. The first female to be elected to Wisconsin Farmers Union's board was Ruth Huntington of Mondovi, Wisconsin, in 1952.

In 1930, the National Farmers Union established a youth education program after a call for more formalized youth involvement in the organization. In November 2017, the Wood-Portage-Waupaca County chapter of Wisconsin Farmers Union elected Alicia Razvi as the first Muslim county president.

== Current activities ==
=== Renewable energy and the environment ===
NFU promotes the use of renewable energy sources such as ethanol, biodiesel, and wind energy, and took part in the passing of the Renewable Fuel Standard (United States) in 2005. This standard mandated the use of 8 billion US gallons (30,000,000 m^{3}) of renewable fuels by 2012, which at the time represented a doubling of domestic renewable fuel production. The organization has also supported legislation promoting gas stations that carry E-85. The organization is in favor of an ethanol fuel tax incentive.

In 2010, NFU started work on a carbon credit program, which would allow farmers to earn income by storing carbon in their soil through “no-till crop production, conversion of cropland to grass, sustainable management of native rangeland, and tree plantings”. In the program’s first two years of operation, it had earned over $8 million for participating producers.

=== Transportation ===
NFU supports the creation and maintenance of a system of waterways, railways, and roads that ensure the flow of products to the market.” The organization also supports the continued expansion of telecom utilities into rural areas, as well as adequate health care, including increased funding for emergency response personnel and greater access to prescription drugs.

=== Economic policy ===
NFU has opposed the privatization of Social Security, citing the aging population and slow economic growth of rural America. NFU distinguishes between "Free Trade" and "Fair Trade", and advocates for policies which support family farms and ranches.

NFU supports Country-of-Origin Labeling (COOL). COOL was first passed in 2002 and revised in 2008, and mandates that muscle cuts of meat and some vegetables, nuts, and fruits sold at retail must contain a label informing consumers about the country where the product was sourced.

=== Taxes ===
Concerning tax policy, NFU opposes the use of flat tax. The organization favors limited income tax refunds for lands used for agricultural purposes. NFU advocates for estate tax relief for family farms and ranches. NFU has supported the Safe Water Drinking Act, which helps protect groundwater in rural areas. It is also in favor of conservation, responsible use of public lands, responsible use of chemical agents, and protection of wildlife and endangered species.

=== Electoral politics ===
The NFU ranks political candidates based on how their proposed policies would support NFU priorities. During the 2008 presidential election, Barack Obama received a perfect 100 percent rating, based on his support of the 2008 Farm Bill and a renewable fuel standard. The organization gave John McCain a grade of zero percent, partly because he favored reducing subsidies for ethanol and food products. The NFU typically supports liberal policies, such as increased government and environmental regulation, anti-trust activities, and social safety net programs.

== See also ==
- American Farm Bureau Federation
- Farmers' suicides in the United States
- National Grange of the Order of Patrons of Husbandry
- National Farmers Organization
