= Thomas H. Eliot =

American politician

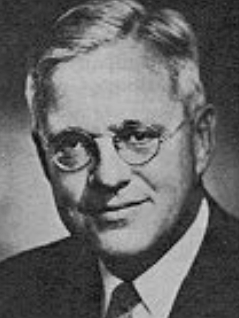

Vice Chair of the United States Advisory Commission on Intergovernmental Relations
- In office April 30, 1964 – April 29, 1966
- Appointed by: Lyndon Johnson
- Preceded by: Don Hummel
- Succeeded by: Price Daniel

Executive Director of the Special Commission on the Structure of the State Government of Massachusetts
- In office 1950–1952
- Governor: Paul A. Dever
- Preceded by: position established
- Succeeded by: William A. Waldron

Member of the U.S. House of Representatives from Massachusetts's 9th district
- In office January 3, 1941 – January 3, 1943
- Preceded by: Robert Luce
- Succeeded by: Charles L. Gifford

General Counsel of the Social Security Board
- In office 1935–1937
- Preceded by: position established
- Succeeded by: Jack B. Tate

Personal details
- Born: Thomas Hopkinson Eliot; June 14, 1907 Cambridge, Massachusetts, U.S.
- Died: October 14, 1991 (aged 84) Cambridge, Massachusetts, U.S.
- Resting place: Mount Auburn Cemetery, Cambridge, Massachusetts
- Party: Democratic
- Spouse: Lois Jameson
- Children: 2
- Education: Harvard University (AB, LLB)

Thomas Hopkinson Eliot (June 14, 1907 – October 14, 1991) was an American lawyer, politician, and academic who served as chancellor of Washington University in St. Louis and as a congressman in the United States House of Representatives from Massachusetts.

== Early life ==
Eliot was born in Cambridge, Massachusetts into the prominent Eliot family to Frances Hopkinson Eliot and Samuel A. Eliot II, a prominent Unitarian minister and member of the prominent Eliot family. At the time of Thomas' birth, his father was president of the American Unitarian Association and his grandfather, Charles W. Eliot, had been president of Harvard University for nearly four decades.

He attended Browne & Nichols School in Cambridge, graduated from Harvard University in 1928 and was a student at Emmanuel College in Cambridge University, from 1928 to 1929. He graduated from Harvard Law School in 1932 and was admitted to the bar in 1933, commencing practice in Buffalo, New York.

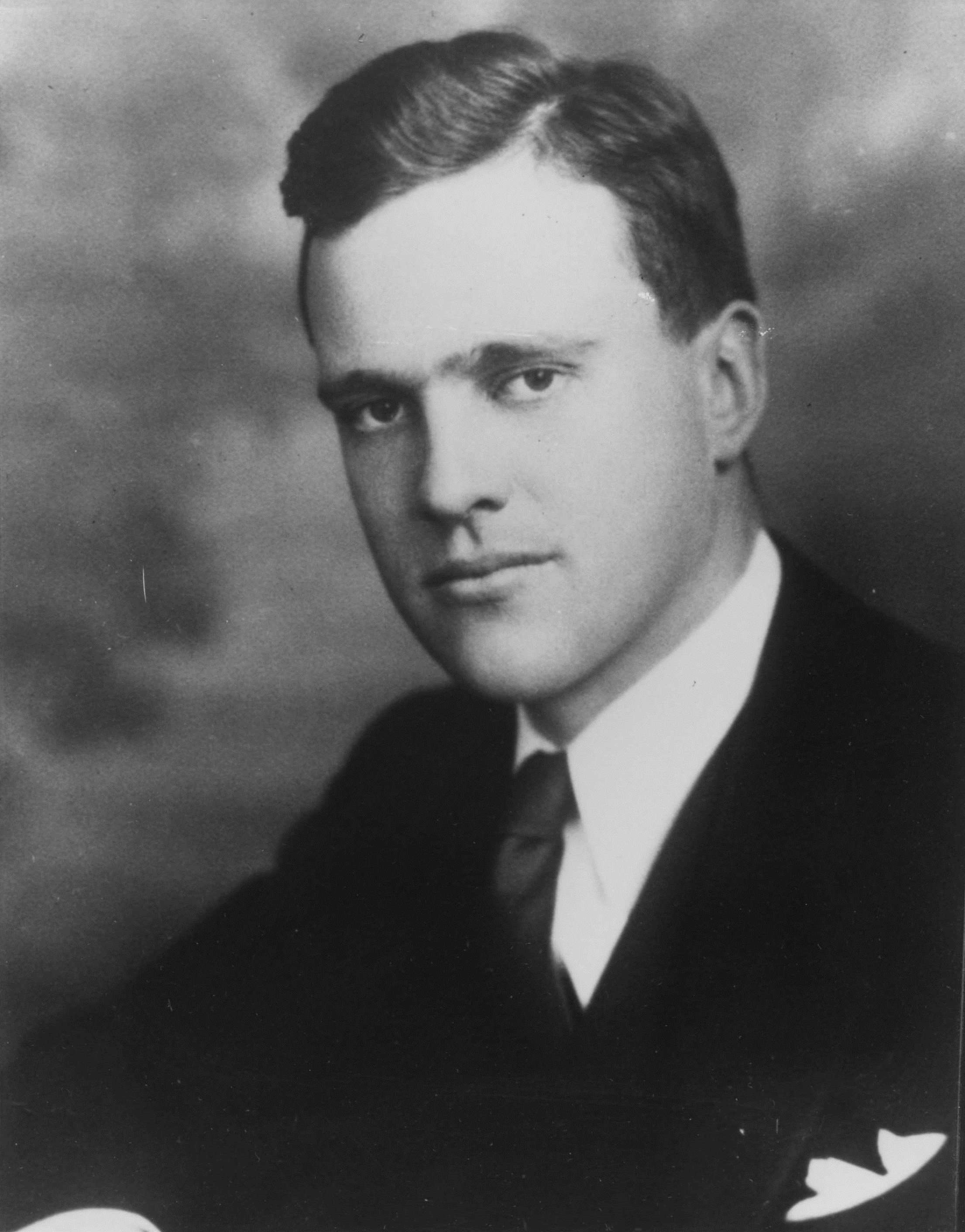
Eliot as general counsel of the Social Security Board.

Eliot served as assistant solicitor in the United States Department of Labor from 1933 to 1935 and as general counsel for the Social Security Board from 1935 to 1937. He was a lecturer on government at Harvard University from 1937 to 1938, and regional director of the Wage and Hour Division in the Department of Labor from 1939 to 1940.

== Career ==
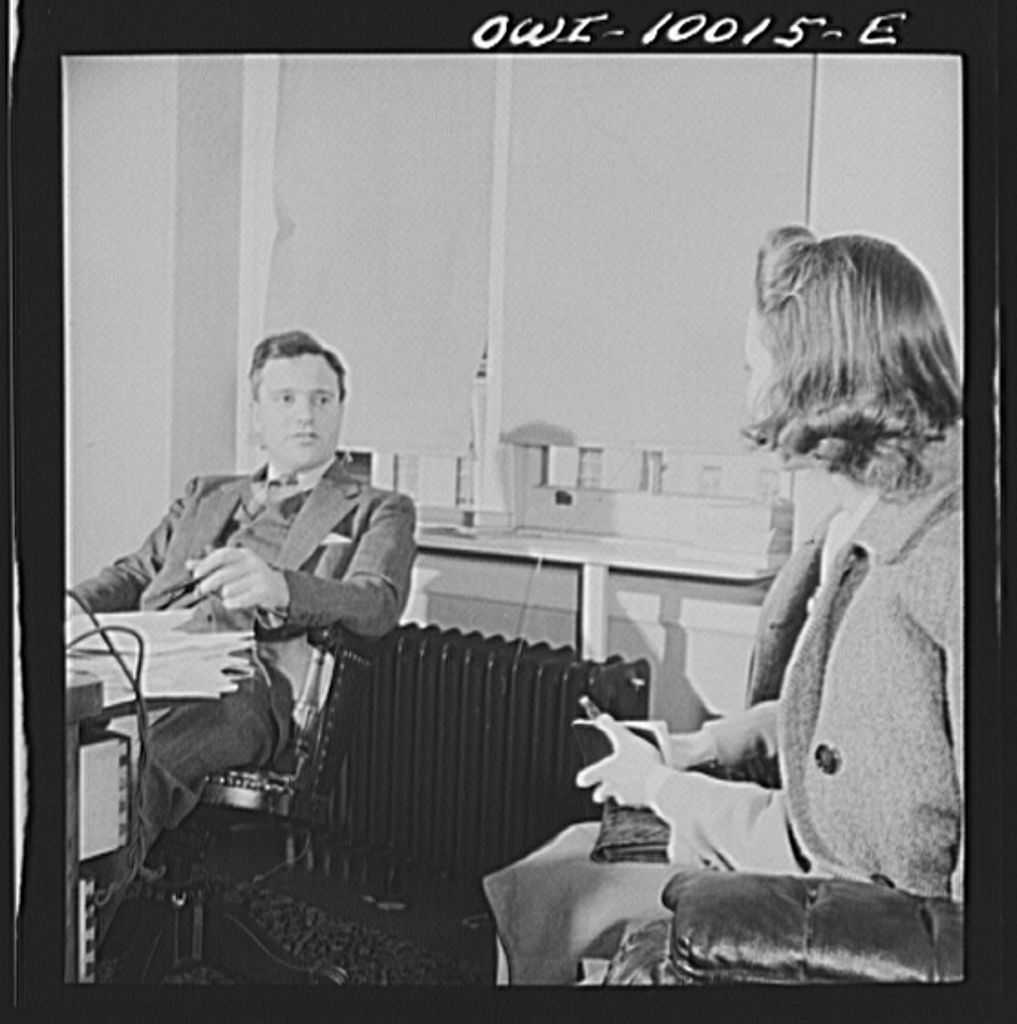
Congressman Tom Eliot of Massachusetts chatting with a delegate from his state.

In 1938 Eliot, a Democrat, ran for election to the Seventy-sixth Congress, losing to Republican Robert Luce. Eliot defeated Luce in a rematch in 1940, winning election to the Seventy-seventh Congress (January 3, 1941 – January 3, 1943). He was an unsuccessful candidate for renomination in 1942 to the Seventy-eighth Congress and for nomination in 1944 to the Seventy-ninth Congress; both times his successful opponent was the colorful longtime Boston politician James M. Curley.

Eliot saw war service in 1943 as director of the British Division, Office of War Information, London, England, and special assistant to the United States Ambassador. From 1943 to 1944 he was chairman of the appeals committee of the National War Labor Board. He served with the Office of Strategic Services in 1944, and from November 1944 to November 1945 was chief counsel of the Division of Power, U.S. Department of the Interior. In addition, Eliot served as New England chairman of the United Negro College Fund.

After the war, Eliot engaged in the practice of law in Boston from 1945 to 1950, before returning to university life. From 1950 to 1952 he served as the executive director of the Massachusetts Special Commission on the Structure of the State Government. In 1952 he was appointed professor of political science at Washington University in St. Louis, where he wrote Governing America; the Politics of a Free People: National, State, and Local Government, and American Government: Problems and Readings in Political Analysis. He was a professor of constitutional law from 1958 to 1961. In 1961 he moved to the Washington University College of Liberal Arts, serving as dean from 1961 to 1962, and chancellor from 1962 to 1971. He also served as vice chairman of the United States Commission on Intergovernmental Relations from 1964 to 1966 and as president of the Salzburg Global Seminar from 1971 to 1977; and as a teacher at Buckingham, Browne & Nichols School in Cambridge, Massachusetts (his high school alma mater, which had merged with another school), from 1977 to 1985.

== Personal life and death ==
He married Lois Jameson and they had two children. Eliot was a resident of Cambridge until his death there in 1991. He was interred at Mount Auburn Cemetery in Cambridge, Massachusetts.

== Bibliography ==
- Eliot, Thomas H. Recollections of the New Deal: When the People Mattered. Edited with an introduction by John Kenneth Galbraith. Boston: Northeastern University Press, 1992;
- Eliot, Thomas H. Public and Personal. Edited by Frank O'Brien. St. Louis: Washington University Press, 1971.

U.S. House of Representatives
Preceded by Robert Luce	Member of the U.S. House of Representatives from Massachusetts's 9th congressional district January 3, 1941 – January 3, 1943	Succeeded by Charles L. Gifford
