= David Frederickson =

American politician (born 1944)

Dave Frederickson
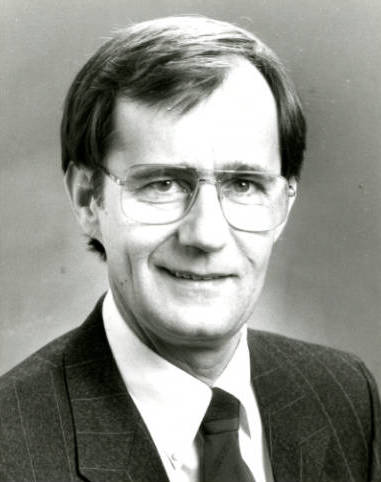
- Frederickson in 1991

Agriculture Commissioner of Minnesota
- In office January 3, 2011 – January 7, 2019
- Governor: Mark Dayton
- Preceded by: Gene Hugoson
- Succeeded by: Thom Petersen

Member of the Minnesota Senate from the 20th district
- In office January 6, 1987 – January 4, 1993
- Preceded by: Randy P. Kamrath
- Succeeded by: Steve Dille

Personal details
- Born: March 2, 1944 (age 82) Murdock, Minnesota, U.S.
- Party: Democratic
- Spouse: Kay
- Children: 2
- Education: St. Cloud State University (BS)

David J. Frederickson (born March 2, 1944) is an American politician who served as Commissioner of the Minnesota Department of Agriculture from January 2011 to 2019, and previously as a member of the Minnesota Senate from West Central Minnesota from 1987 to 1993.

== Early life and education ==
Born in Murdock, Minnesota, Frederickson graduated from St. Cloud State University, earning a Bachelor of Science degree in Education. A fourth-generation farmer, he earned a reputation as a strong advocate for farmers and agricultural issues, education and tax reform.

== Career ==
=== Minnesota Senate ===
First elected to the Senate in 1986 in the Democratic-Farmer-Labor Party’s “firestorm” that swept through the region, giving Democrats unprecedented control of southwestern Minnesota for the next several election cycles, Frederickson served two terms. He was re-elected in 1990. He represented the old District 20A, which included all or portions of Chippewa, Lac qui Parle, Redwood, Swift and Yellow Medicine counties.

While in the legislature, Frederickson was a member of the Senate Agriculture and Rural Development, Education, Local and Urban Government, Taxes and Tax Laws and Governmental Operations committees, and of various sub-committees relevant to each area. He chaired the Agriculture and Rural Development Subcommittee on Agriculture Resources during the 1991 and 1992 sessions.

=== Farmers Union ===
After Frederickson's service in the legislature concluded, he was elected president of the Minnesota Farmers Union, serving from 1991 to 2002. In 2002, he was elected president of the National Farmers Union, a national federation of State Farmers Union organizations in the United States and the second largest general farm organization in the country, serving until 2006. In 2009, he received the NFU’s Meritorious Award for his years of service on behalf of Minnesota and American farmers. He worked as an Agricultural Outreach Director for U.S. Senator Amy Klobuchar from 2007 to 2010.

=== Agriculture Commissioner ===
On December 21, 2010, Minnesota Governor-elect Mark Dayton announced that Frederickson would be the state's new commissioner of agriculture, succeeding long-time commissioner and former state representative Gene Hugoson, who held the position since 1995. He took over the department on January 3, 2011. In 2014, Frederickson was honored at the Humphrey-Mondale Awards and received the Orville L. Freeman Award for Distinguished Service to Greater Minnesota and Agricultural Issues. Frederickson's term as Agriculture Commissioner ended in 2019, and with his term's end, so too came his retirement.

== See also ==
- Politics of Minnesota
