= Henrik Shipstead =

American politician (1881–1960)

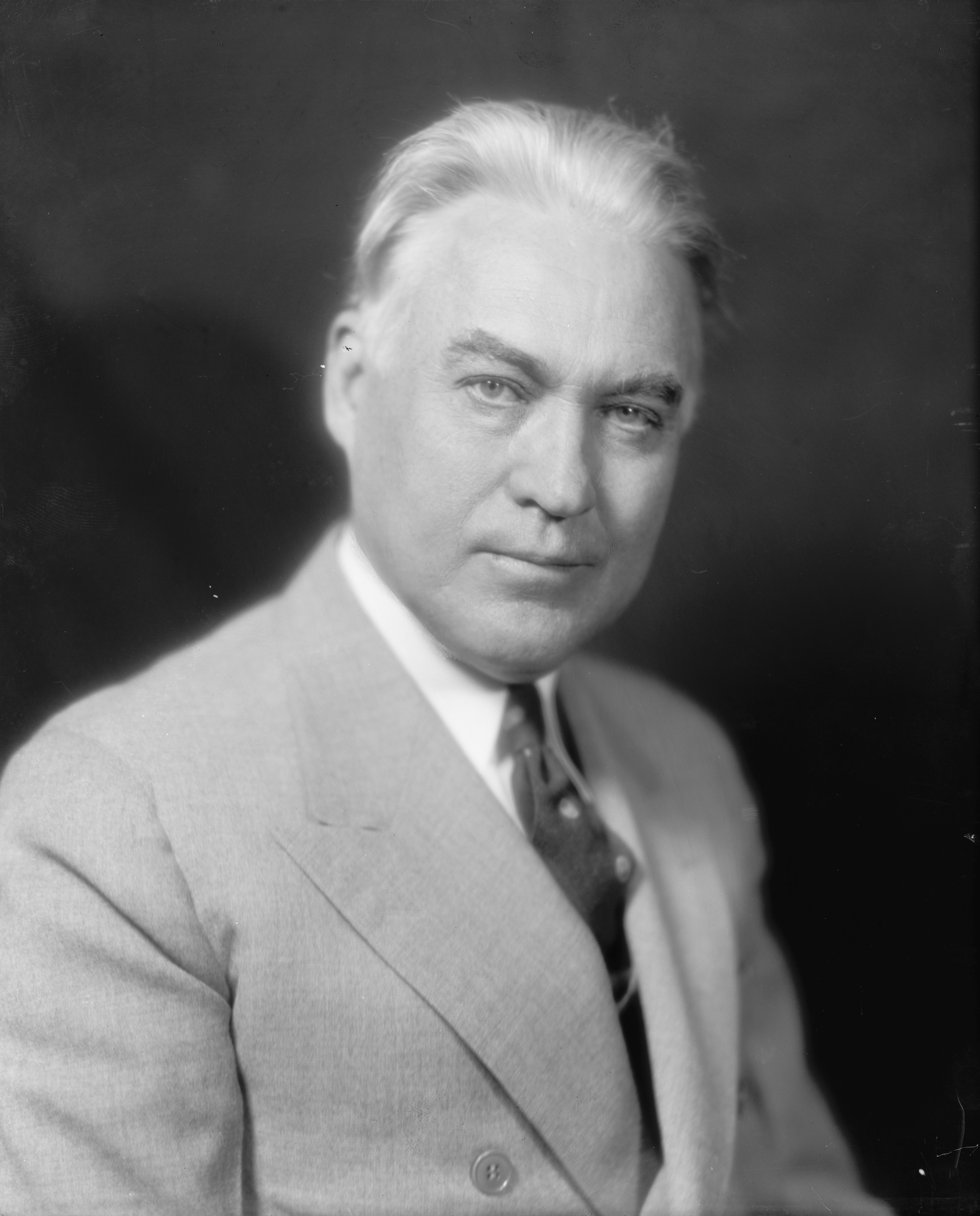
- Portrait by Harris & Ewing c. 1930s

United States Senator from Minnesota
- In office March 4, 1923 – January 3, 1947
- Preceded by: Frank B. Kellogg
- Succeeded by: Edward John Thye

Member of the Minnesota House of Representatives from the 47th district
- In office January 1, 1917 – January 5, 1919
- Preceded by: Iver J. Lee
- Succeeded by: Carl N. Nelson

Personal details
- Born: January 8, 1881 Kandiyohi County, Minnesota, U.S.
- Died: June 26, 1960 (aged 79) Alexandria, Minnesota, U.S.
- Resting place: Kinkead Cemetery, Alexandria, Minnesota, U.S.
- Party: Republican (before 1922, 1940–1960); Farmer-Labor (1923–1940)
- Other political affiliations: Independent (1920)
- Education: Northwestern University
- Profession: Dentist

Henrik Shipstead (January 8, 1881 – June 26, 1960) was a Norwegian-American dentist and politician who served in the United States Senate from 1923 to 1947, representing the state of Minnesota. He served first as a member of the Minnesota Farmer-Labor Party from 1923 to 1941 and then as a Republican from 1941 to 1947.

Few members of Congress in American history were more consistent in opposing US foreign interventionism, despite not believing himself to be an isolationist and voting in favor of declaring war on Japan after the attack on Pearl Harbor. He is also noted for his antisemitism and support of anti-Jewish conspiracy theories.

== Early life ==
Shipstead was born on a farm in Kandiyohi County, Minnesota, in 1881 to Norwegian immigrant parents. In the early 20th century, he set up a dental practice and was elected president of the village council of Glenwood in neighboring Pope County.

== Political career ==
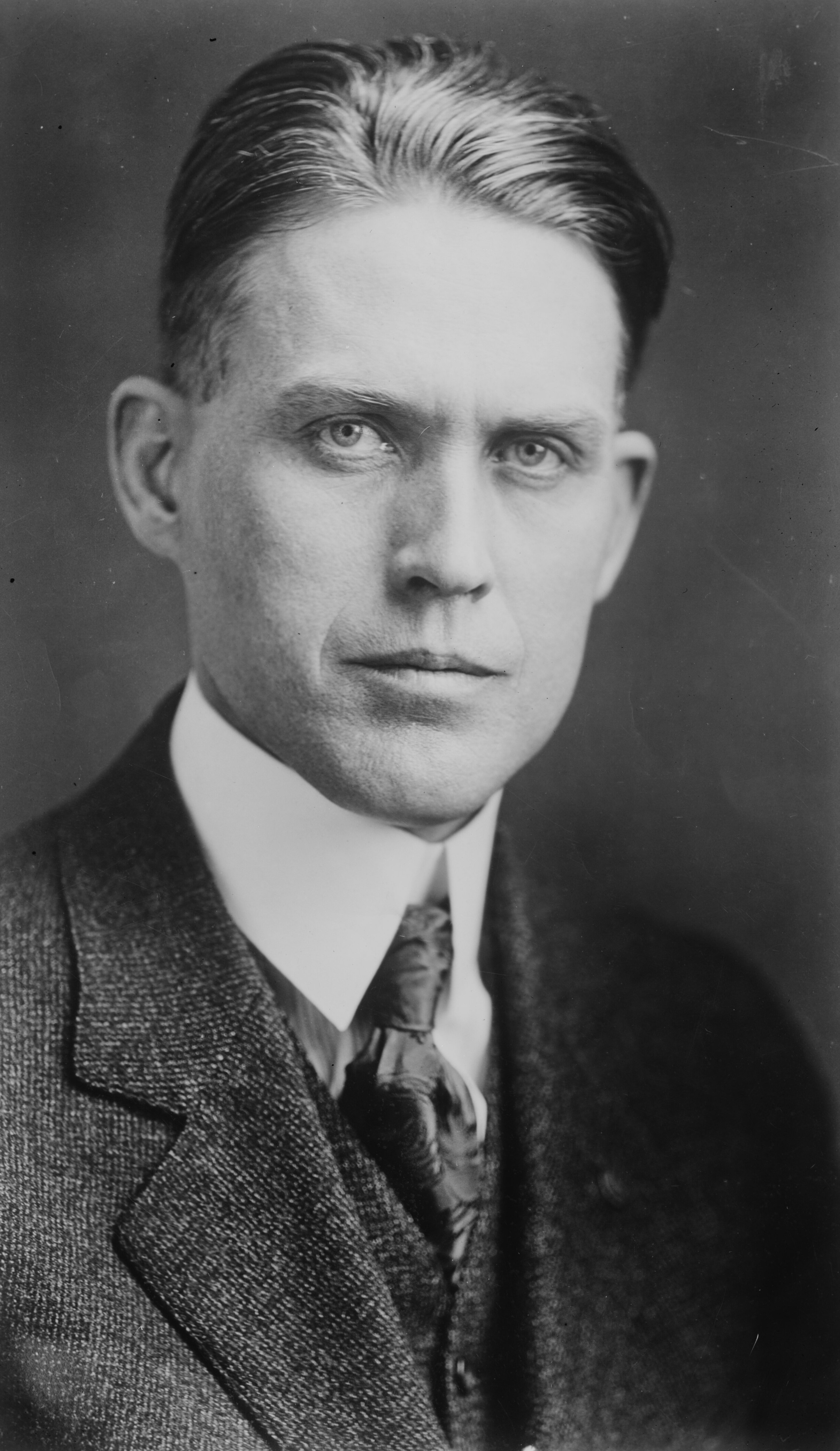
Doctor Henrik Shipstead c. 1915–1920

Shipstead entered politics as a Republican, serving one term in the Minnesota House of Representatives from 1917 to 1919. In 1918, he ran for Congress in Minnesota's 7th congressional district, narrowly losing the Republican primary to incumbent Andrew Volstead. Two years later, he ran for governor of Minnesota as an independent, losing to Republican J. A. O. Preus but coming in second place with over 35% of the vote. He finally returned to public office in 1922, when he was elected to the U.S. Senate under the banner of the new Farmer-Labor Party. While he generally shared the party's left-wing agenda, he rejected the extreme anti-capitalism of some members. Although he was the only Farmer-Laborite in the Senate, he won appointment to the powerful Foreign Relations Committee.

Shipstead opposed U.S. entry into the League of Nations and the World Court. He called for the cancellation of German reparations, which he regarded as vindictive. Unlike non-interventionists in the Old Right, he objected to the U.S. occupation of Haiti, the Dominican Republic and Nicaragua. He blamed these interventions on the Roosevelt Corollary to the Monroe Doctrine of 1905, which had turned the United States into an arrogant "policeman of the western continent."

=== Isolationism ===
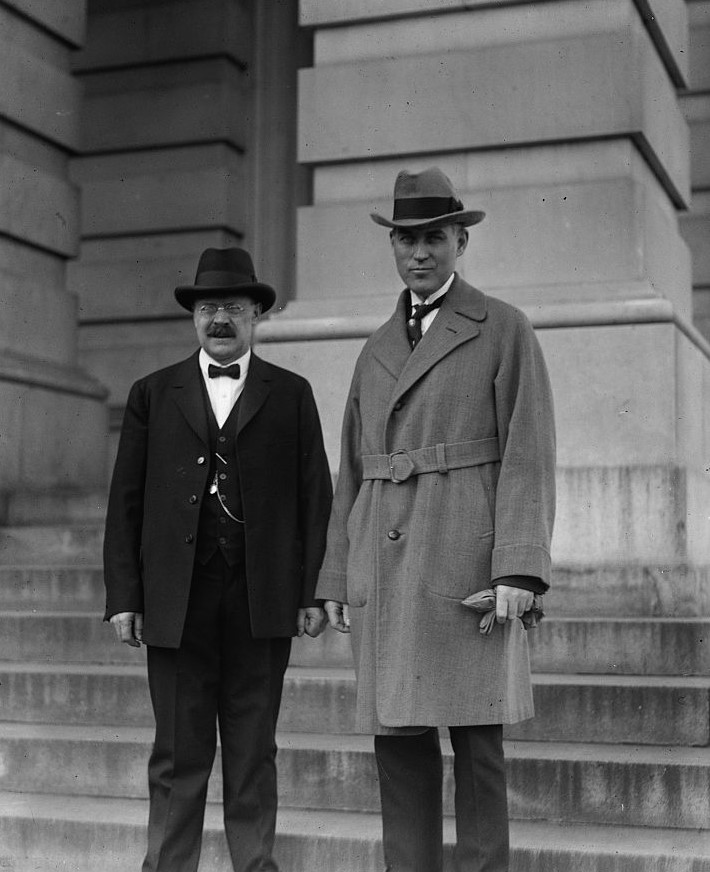
Shipstead and fellow Minnesota Farmer–Labor Senator Magnus Johnson, 1923

Shipstead did not consider himself an isolationist. While he favored a policy of political non-intervention overseas, he opposed the Smoot-Hawley Tariff of 1930, which he called "one of the greatest and most vicious isolationist policies this government has ever enacted." He argued that high tariffs "raise prices to consumers" and make "monopolies richer and people poorer." Affable and dignified, his adversaries generally liked him personally. He concluded, "It doesn't necessarily follow that a radical has to be a damned fool."

Along with Congressman Robert Luce of Massachusetts, he introduced the bill that enlarged the purview of the United States Commission of Fine Arts to include new buildings on private land facing federal property. The commission, established in 1910, reviews new buildings, memorials, monuments, and public art constructed on federal property in Washington, D.C. The bill, the Shipstead-Luce Act, is still in effect.

Shipstead defected from the Farmer-Labor party in the late 1930s, charging that Communist elements were taking control. He won reelection to the Senate in 1940 as a Republican.

=== Antisemitism ===
Shipstead was an outspoken ally of Henry Ford and Charles Lindbergh, and he trafficked in anti-Jewish conspiracy theories, as well as straightforward bigotry against Jewish people. Shipstead said he believed that The Protocols of the Elders of Zion were fact, and he frequently encouraged other people to read them. Meanwhile, few fought more tenaciously against Franklin D. Roosevelt's efforts to enter the war in Europe. Although Shipstead voted for the declaration of war after the attack on Pearl Harbor, he still maintained his independence from Roosevelt. In October 1942, for example, he was one of the very few to vote against Selective Service, just as he had in 1940.

=== World War II ===
In April 1943 Isaiah Berlin, a top British expert on American politics, secretly prepared an analysis for the British Foreign Office that stated that Henrik Shipstead was:

a rabid Isolationist of Norwegian descent, elected largely by the Scandinavian vote. A very narrow, bigoted, crotchety man, intensely antagonistic to Minnesota's Governor Harold Stassen. A member of the Farm Bloc and consistently votes against the Administration.

In protest of his views, a group of southern senators including J. Lister Hill, John H. Bankhead II, Tom Stewart, Kenneth McKellar, Richard Russell Jr. and Walter F. George stopped conversing, got up, and left from the Senate's lunch counter when Senator Shipstead tried to join them, with Hill later telling reporters they "would not associate" with the Senator due to his isolationist views. Later, after a private argument with the same six Senators, Shipstead lamented what he called the "extreme Anglophilia of the southern states." Richard Russell Jr. said that Shipstead was "a chicken" who was "in kahoots" with Germany.

=== Postwar ===
Shipstead's vote against US entry into the United Nations was entirely predictable by anyone who had followed his career. It was the capstone of decades of opposition to foreign entanglements. Like many modern conservative critics of the UN, he feared that it would foster a world superstate. But he also believed that the major powers would use the UN as a tool to dominate smaller countries. He and William Langer were the only two senators to vote against the United Nations Charter. Not surprisingly, Shipstead and Langer were also among the seven senators who opposed full United States entry into the United Nations. These votes may have cost him reelection a year later; a new breed of "internationalists", led by Governor Edward John Thye and former Governor Stassen, assumed leadership of the Minnesota state GOP, and in 1946, Shipstead lost the Republican primary to Thye.

== Later life and death ==
After his loss, Shipstead retired to rural western Minnesota, where he died in 1960.

== See also ==
- List of United States senators who switched parties

Party political offices
First	Farmer–Labor nominee for U.S. Senator from Minnesota (Class 1); 1922, 1928, 1934	Succeeded by Elmer Austin Benson
Preceded by N. J. Holmberg	Republican nominee for U.S. Senator from Minnesota (Class 1); 1940	Succeeded by Edward John Thye
U.S. Senate
Preceded by Frank B. Kellogg	U.S. senator (Class 1) from Minnesota; 1923–1947; Served alongside: Knute Nelson, Magnus Johnson, Thomas D. Schall, Elmer Austin Benson, Guy V. Howard, Ernest Lundeen, Joseph H. Ball, Arthur E. Nelson	Succeeded by Edward John Thye
