= World War Veterans =

American veterans organization

The World War Veterans (WWV) was established in 1919 as a progressive organization of American veterans of the First World War. It officially claimed to have been organized just 9 days after the armistice, on November 20, 1918 in Bois, France, while the group filed formal certificate of incorporation in New York state on February 13, 1919. The purposes of the corporation stated at that time included (1) To band together veterans of World War I who have served in any branch of the United States service; (2) To preserve the ideals for which these veterans served; and (3) To aid such veterans to secure adequate employment and to facilitate their return to civilian life.

The group sought "live wire, red blooded returned servicemen" in its ranks.

== History ==
The WWV established a "Northwestern Division" prior to January 1919 at a meeting held in Minneapolis. Anyone having an honorable discharge from the US or Allied powers was eligible for membership.

Further articles of incorporation were filed in New York on December 12, 1919 by merging the original World War Veterans with the Rank and File Association and the Soldiers, Sailors, and Marines Protective Association of New York into one organization.

The WWV does not seem to have had a constitution in its earliest phase, but was based around an organizational "preamble":

The World War Veterans are strictly non-partisan.

For the love of our country and humanity, we, returned Soldiers, Sailors, and Marines who served in the Entente Allies during the World War, 1914–1919, are uniting ourselves into one great fraternal organization for the mutual protection of our rights, advancements of interests, promotion of our welfare, for the fostering and aiding of our cordial, social, and fraternal relationship among our members. To secure forever the blessings of Liberty, equality, justice, and peace to ourselves and all our fellow citizens in the United States of America.

The slogan of the World War Veterans was: "The enforcement of the Constitution of the United States of America as it is written, and in the spirit of its founders."

The primary unit of the WWV was known as a "Post," consisting of 10 or more ex-service men. Charters were obtained from state headquarters for $5, and the Post was responsible for sending per capita dues of 10 cents each month to state headquarters. Individual ex-servicemen could join as "members at large" by sending in $1 to national headquarters, including a 25 cent initiation fee and 3 months dues at 25 cents per month.

From about January 1920, the group also had an Auxiliary which was open to the general public, open to anyone wishing to become a member who believed in "Enforcement of the Constitution of the United States as it is written."

The auxiliaries of the World War Veterans had three basic organizational rules: (1) No religious subjects must be discussed at meetings. (2) No political party will receive the endorsement of the group. (3) All speakers must confine their utterances within the limits as guaranteed by the constitution of the United States as it is written. All members of the regular WWV organization were to automatically be enrolled as members of the WWV Auxiliary, and the Auxiliaries were to meet on different nights than the regular WWV Post. Dues in the WWV Auxiliary were $1 per year.

== Organizational Convention, Minneapolis, MN, March 31 – April 1, 1921 ==
The March–April 1921 convention was attended by delegates representing 22 states.

In the first half of 1921, the national office of the World War Veterans was maintained at 505 Temple Court, Minneapolis, MN. Officers of the World War Veterans organization included:

- National Chairman: Carl Calvin, Minneapolis.
- National Secretary-Treasurer: Winfred G. Hedenberg, Minneapolis.

The World War Veterans also had an "Eastern Division Organizer," John M. Levitt of the Bridgeport Central Labor Union, Bridgeport, CT.

== First National Convention, Chicago, IL, July 1–4, 1921 ==
The July 1921 convention of the World War Veterans was attended by 48 delegates. The gathering was addressed by Raefel Mallen.

The convention elected the following officers of the organization:

- National Chairman: Andrew J. Cooper, Minneapolis.
- National Secretary-Treasurer: Emil Holmes, Minneapolis.
- National Executive Committee: Carl Calvin (St. Paul, MN), Andrew J. Cooper (Minneapolis, MN), Emil Holmes, (Minneapolis, MN), J.M. Levitt (New York), J.H. McIntyre (Quincy, IL).
- Delegates to International Convention of Former Combatants of the Great War: Emil Holmes, J.H. McIntyre.

The platform of the organization was reaffirmed by the convention.

The convention drew up plans for an active campaign of organization around all parts of the US and for working with labor unions to doing away with future wars.

A number of resolutions were passed by the gathering. The "Open Shop" campaign was denounced, judges issuing anti-labor injunctions were condemned, the Ku Klux Klan and racial violence was condemned. The civil war against West Virginia miners was denounced and the Non-Partisan League's industrial program for North Dakota was endorsed. Resolutions were passed calling for freedom for Ireland and for the reopening of trade relations with Soviet Russia.
