= Tom Buis =

American lobbyist

Tom Buis is the former president of the American National Farmers Union (NFU) and was CEO of Growth Energy until 2015. Before moving to NFU, Buis was the Senior Agriculture Policy Advisor for Senate Majority Leader Tom Daschle (D-S.D.).

== Early life ==
Tom Buis grew up with two brothers on his family's farm in Putnam and Morgan Counties, West Central Indiana. After completing his education he became a full-time grain and livestock farmer in Indiana.

== Congressional staffer ==
In 1987, Buis moved to Washington, D.C. where he worked as a legislative assistant and legislative director for U.S. Representative Jim Jontz (D-Ind.), and as special assistant for agriculture to U.S. Senator Birch Bayh (D-Ind.). He worked for nearly five years as senior agricultural policy adviser to Senate Majority Leader Tom Daschle (D-S.D).

== National Farmers Union ==
Buis began work with the National Farmers Union in 1998. He was vice president of government relations and was elected president 2006 and again in 2008. He stepped down to become CEO of Growth Energy.

== Growth Energy ==
Buis joined Growth Energy as CEO in March 2009 and worked until July 2015. After stepping down as CEO, Buis went on to be Co-Chair of the Board.

Growth Energy is an interest group representing the interests of the ethanol industry. In May 2009, Buis was selected as one of Washington's top 50 lobbyists by The Hill newspaper. Additionally, Buis' name appeared frequently on many lists of potential candidates to be in President Obama's cabinet as Secretary of Agriculture, despite being known primarily as a lobbyist.

On September 19, 2016, Buis was presented with the America's Fuel award for his work in promoting the ethanol industry.
