= Minnesota Department of Agriculture =

Government agency overview
- Formed: 1885
- Preceding Government agency: Minnesota State Dairy Commission
- Headquarters: 625 Robert St N, St Paul, MN 55155
- Government agency executive: Thom Petersen, Commissioner

Minnesota Department of Agriculture (MDA) is a government agency in Minnesota responsible for managing the state's food supply, natural resources, and agricultural economy.

== History ==
The department began as the Minnesota State Dairy Commission in 1885 to eliminate the sale of adulterated milk and block the sale of oleomargarine as a substitute for butter. It was staffed by a department head, a single assistant and one clerk who doubled as the food chemist. In 1885, the budget was $6,000 per year.

== Commissioners ==
- Chris Heen (1920–1925).
- Byron G. Allen (1955–1961)
- Jon Wefald (1971-1978)
- William Walker (1978-1979)
- Mark W. Seetin (1979-1983)
- James W. Nichols (1983-1991)
- Elton Redalen (1991–1995)
- Gene Hugoson (1995–2011)
- David Frederickson (2011–2019)
- Thom Petersen (2019–present)
