= Edward J. Thye =

American politician (1896–1969

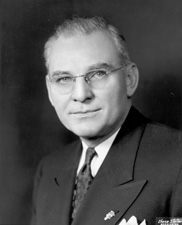

United States Senator from Minnesota
- In office January 3, 1947 – January 3, 1959
- Preceded by: Henrik Shipstead
- Succeeded by: Eugene McCarthy

26th Governor of Minnesota
- In office April 27, 1943 – January 8, 1947
- Lieutenant: C. Elmer Anderson; Archie H. Miller
- Preceded by: Harold Stassen
- Succeeded by: Luther Youngdahl

31st Lieutenant Governor of Minnesota
- In office January 4, 1943 – April 27, 1943
- Governor: Harold Stassen
- Preceded by: C. Elmer Anderson
- Succeeded by: Archie H. Miller

Personal details
- Born: Edward John Thye; April 26, 1896 Frederick, South Dakota, U.S.
- Died: August 28, 1969 (aged 73) Northfield, Minnesota, U.S.
- Party: Republican
- Spouse(s): Hazel Ramage (1921), Myrtle Ennor Oliver (1942)
- Profession: Politician

Edward John Thye (April 26, 1896 – August 28, 1969) was an American politician. A member of the Republican Party, he was the 26th governor of Minnesota from 1943 to 1947 and a United States senator from 1947 to 1959.

== Early life and education ==
Edward Thye was born on a farm near Frederick, South Dakota. One of nine children, he was the son of Andrew John and Bertha (née Wangan) Thye. His father, a farmer, was born in Norway and immigrated to the United States in 1872. His brother Ted Thye became a professional wrestler in the Pacific Northwest.

In 1904, Thye and his family moved to Northfield, Minnesota, where he attended local public schools. He took courses at the Tractor and Internal Combustion School in Minneapolis in 1913, and graduated from the American Business College in 1916. After the United States entered World War I, he enlisted as a private in the United States Army Air Corps in 1917. He served overseas in France, and was eventually promoted to second lieutenant.

== Early career ==
After his military service, Thye returned to Minnesota in 1919 and was employed as a tractor expert with the Deere & Webber Company in Minneapolis, becoming a salesman in 1920. He married Hazel Ramage (daughter of Robert and Bertha (Frink) Ramage) in 1921, and the couple remained married until her death in 1936; they had one daughter, Jean Roberta. He continued to work for Deere until 1922, when he became manager and owner of a dairy farm near Northfield.

In 1925, Thye was elected to the town council of Sciota. He later served a number of years on the Sciota school board. He was president of the Dakota County Farm Bureau (1929–1931), director of Twin City Milk Producers Association (1933), and appraiser for the Federal Land Bank of Minnesota (1933–1934). He became friends with Harold Stassen, and actively supported Stassen's campaign for governor of Minnesota in 1938. He subsequently served as the Dairy and Food Commissioner of Minnesota and deputy commissioner of agriculture (1939–1942).

== Governor of Minnesota ==
Thye was elected the 31st lieutenant governor of Minnesota in November 1942. The same month, he was remarried to Myrtle Ennor Oliver; the couple remained married until his death. On April 27, 1943, Stassen resigned to serve in the United States Navy and Thye succeeded him as the 26th governor of Minnesota. He was elected governor in November 1944 by the largest margin ever for a Minnesota gubernatorial candidate.

In the 1944 presidential election, Thye joined U.S. Senator Henrik Shipstead, an isolationist, in supporting Republican nominee Thomas E. Dewey, the governor of New York. Minnesota's other senator at the time, Joseph H. Ball, refused to support Dewey and crossed party lines to back Franklin D. Roosevelt, who won Minnesota's 11 electoral votes.

During his state administration, Thye established the Department of Aeronautics, the Iron Range Rehabilitation Commission, a postwar planning commission, and a human rights commission. He also increased spending for highway construction and unemployment compensation.

== U.S. Senate ==
Thye was elected as a United States Senator in 1946, defeating Henrik Shipstead in the Republican primary and the Democratic-Farmer-Labor nominee Theodore Jorgenson with 58.9% of the vote. He was re-elected in 1952 with 56.63% of the vote. He served in the Senate from January 3, 1947, to January 3, 1959, in the 80th, 81st, 82nd, 83rd, 84th, and 85th Congresses. Thye voted for the Civil Rights Act of 1957. He lost his 1958 reelection bid to Eugene McCarthy.

== Death ==
Thye died on August 28, 1969, in Northfield, Minnesota, aged 73. He was buried at the Oaklawn Cemetery in Northfield.

== Papers ==
Thye's papers, including correspondence, speeches, background materials, bills and reports, clippings, campaign literature, and related materials reflecting Thye's public and official activities as U.S. senator from Minnesota, are available for research use.

Party political offices
Preceded by C. Elmer Anderson	Republican nominee for Lieutenant Governor of Minnesota; 1942	Succeeded by C. Elmer Anderson
Preceded by Harold Stassen	Republican nominee for Governor of Minnesota; 1944	Succeeded by Luther Youngdahl
Preceded by Henrik Shipstead	Republican nominee for U.S. Senator from Minnesota (Class 1); 1946, 1952, 1958	Succeeded by Wheelock Whitney Jr.
Political offices
Preceded by C. Elmer Anderson	Lieutenant Governor of Minnesota; 1943	Succeeded by Archie H. Miller
Preceded by Harold Stassen	Governor of Minnesota; 1943–1947	Succeeded by Luther Youngdahl
U.S. Senate
Preceded by Henrik Shipstead	U.S. senator (Class 1) from Minnesota; 1947–1959; Served alongside: Joseph H. Ball, Hubert Humphrey	Succeeded by Eugene McCarthy
