= 1936 United States Senate election in Minnesota =

- November 3, 1936
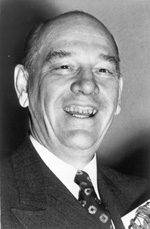

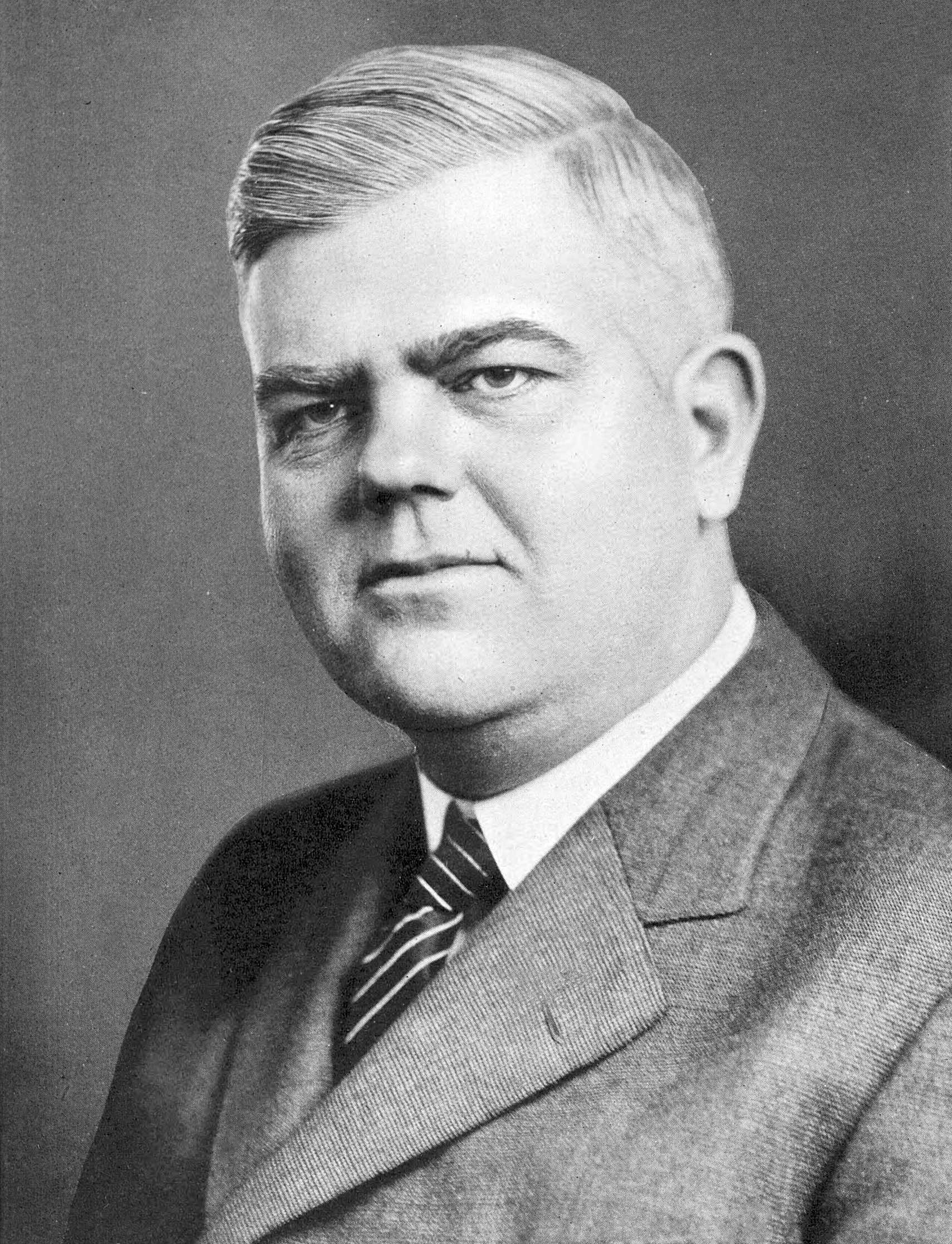
Nominee	Ernest Lundeen	Theodore Christianson
Party	Farmer–Labor	Republican
Popular vote	663,363	402,404
Percentage	62.24%	37.76%
- County results Lundeen: 50–60% 60–70% 70–80% Christianson: 50–60% 60–70%
U.S. senator before election
Elmer A. Benson
Farmer–Labor
Elected U.S. Senator
Ernest Lundeen
Farmer–Labor

The 1936 United States Senate election in Minnesota took place on November 3, 1936. Incumbent Farmer–Laborite Elmer A. Benson, who had been temporarily appointed by Governor Floyd B. Olson in 1935 to fill the seat of the deceased Republican U.S. Senator Thomas D. Schall, opted to run for Governor rather than seek election to a full term or to fill the remainder of the unexpired term. Governor Olson won the Farmer–Labor primary for nomination to the full Senate term, but died of stomach cancer prior to the general election. In Olson's place, the Farmer–Labor Party ran U.S. Representative Ernest Lundeen, who went on to defeat former Governor Theodore Christianson of the Republican Party of Minnesota in the general election. A special election held on the same date elected Republican nominee Guy V. Howard to serve the remainder of Schall's unexpired term.

== Democratic primary ==
=== Candidates ===
==== Declared ====
- Patrick J. Delaney
- Beldin H. Loftsgaarden, Conservative State Senator from the 37th district since 1931

=== Results ===
Democratic primary election results
Party	Candidate	Votes	%
Democratic	Patrick J. Delaney	78,807	66.78%
Democratic	Beldin H. Loftsgaarden	39,199	33.22%
Total votes		118,006	100.00%

Following the death of Floyd B. Olson, the Minnesota Democratic Party opted not to field its nominees in the 1936 senatorial and gubernatorial elections. Consequently, regardless of the fact that the Minnesota Democratic Party had held a primary election and Delaney had won the Democratic nomination in that primary election, Delaney did not appear on the general election ballot.

== Farmer–Labor primary ==
=== Candidates ===
==== Declared ====
- Floyd B. Olson, 22nd Governor of Minnesota since 1931
- Carl E. Taylor

=== Results ===
Farmer–Labor primary election results
Party	Candidate	Votes	%
Farmer–Labor	Floyd B. Olson	175,652	92.64%
Farmer–Labor	Carl E. Taylor	13,952	7.36%
Total votes		189,604	100.00%

=== Olson's death ===
Two months after winning the primary, Olson died of stomach cancer at the Mayo Clinic in Rochester, Minnesota. The state central committee of the Farmer–Labor Party selected Ernest Lundeen, who had served in the United States House of Representatives as a Farmer–Laborite since 1933, had previously served as a Republican in the U.S. House of Representatives from 1917 to 1919, and had been a member of the nonpartisan Minnesota House of Representatives from 1911 to 1914, to fill the vacancy in the party's nomination.

== Republican primary ==
=== Candidates ===
==== Declared ====
- Theodore Christianson, U.S. Representative since 1933 and 21st Governor of Minnesota (1925–1931)
- Margaret H. Schall (named on the ballot as "Mrs. Thomas D. Schall"), widow of Thomas D. Schall

=== Results ===
Republican primary election results
Party	Candidate	Votes	%
Republican	Theodore Christianson	143,684	70.53%
Republican	Mrs. Thomas D. Schall	60,024	29.47%
Total votes		203,708	100.00%

== General election ==
=== Results ===
General election results
Party	Candidate	Votes	%
Farmer–Labor	Ernest Lundeen	663,363	62.24%
Republican	Theodore Christianson	402,404	37.76%
Total votes		1,065,767	100.00%
Majority		260,959	24.48%
Farmer–Labor hold			

== See also ==
- United States Senate elections, 1936 and 1937
