= 1926 Minnesota gubernatorial election =

- November 2, 1926
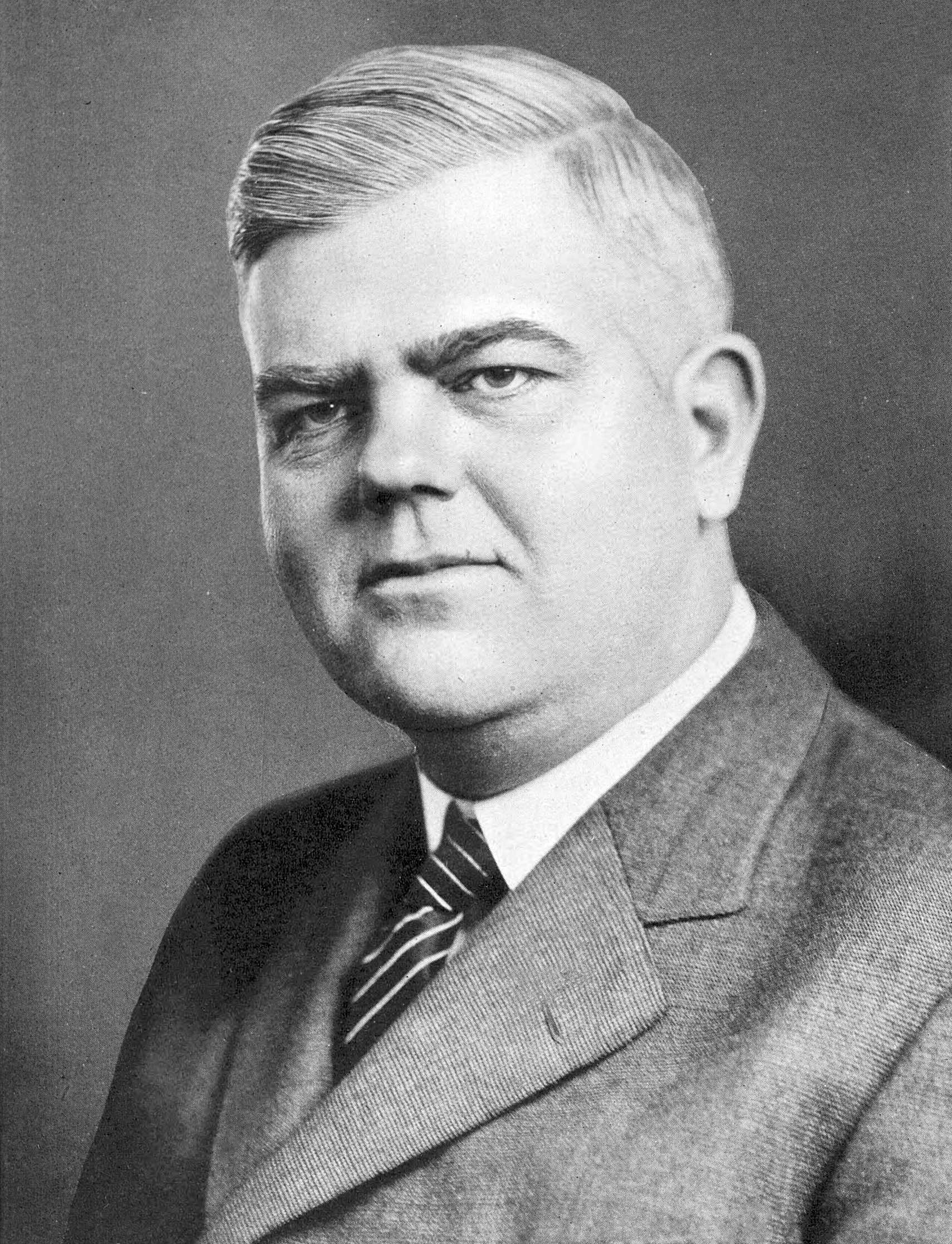

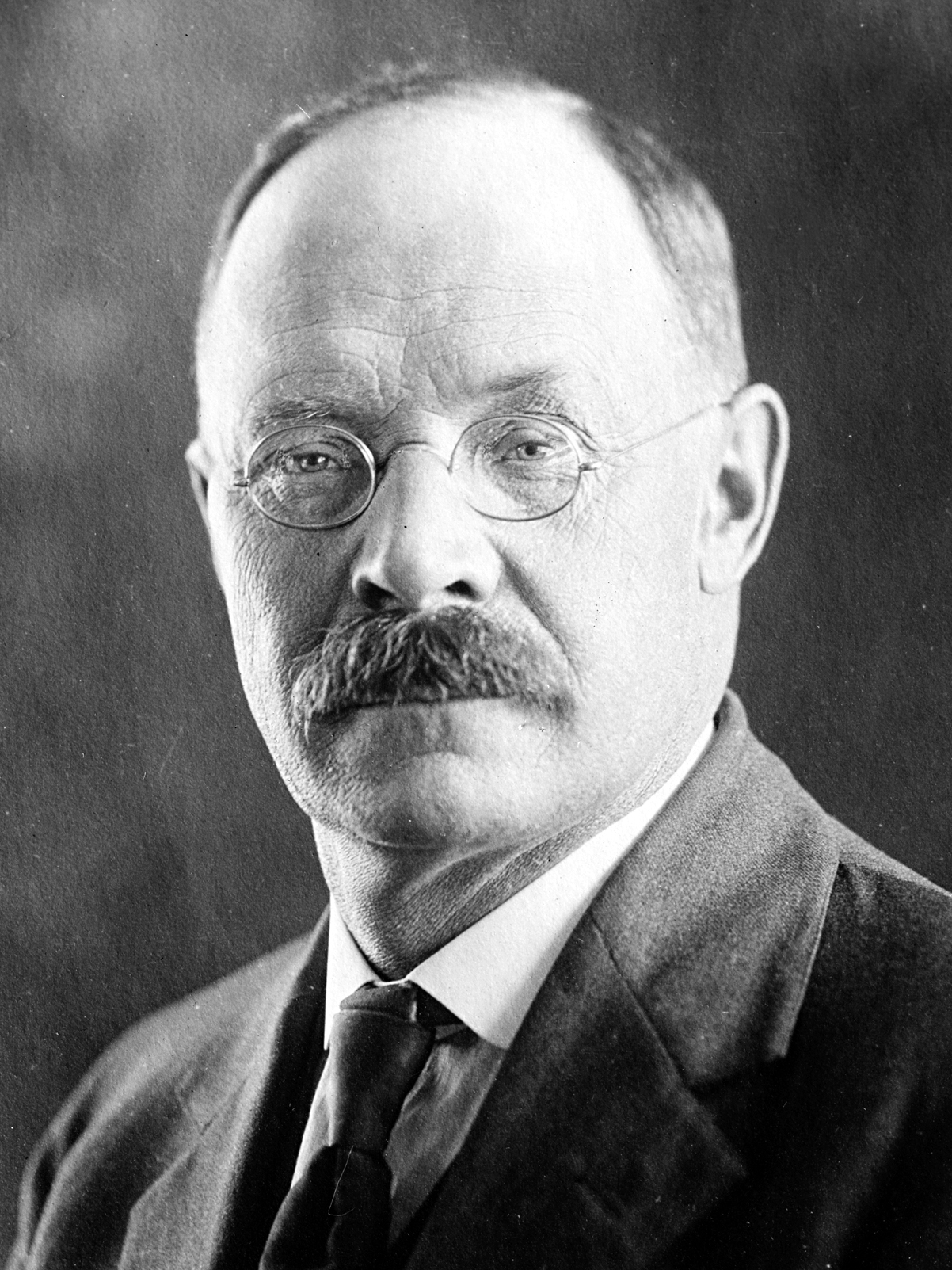

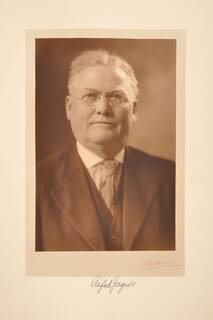
Nominee	Theodore Christianson	Magnus Johnson	Alfred Jacques
Party	Republican	Farmer–Labor	Democratic
Popular vote	395,779	266,845	38,008
Percentage	56.49%	38.09%	5.42%
- County results Christianson: 40–50% 50–60% 60–70% 70–80% Johnson: 40–50% 50–60% 60–70%
Governor before election
Theodore Christianson
Republican
Elected Governor
Theodore Christianson
Republican

The 1926 Minnesota gubernatorial election took place on November 2, 1926. Republican Party of Minnesota candidate Theodore Christianson defeated Farmer–Labor Party challenger Magnus Johnson.

== Republican primary ==
Christianson was the incumbent. Challenging him was George E. Leach. Leach was unable to gain any major popularity outside of Minneapolis, St. Paul and Duluth. The primary election was held on June 21, 1926.

=== Candidates ===
==== Nominated ====
- Theodore Christianson, incumbent

=== Eliminated in primary ===
- George E. Leach, mayor of Minneapolis and primary candidate in 1924

=== Withdrawn ===
- Curtis M. Johnson, president of the State Agricultural Society and primary candidate in 1924

=== Results ===
Republican Party of Minnesota primary results
Party	Candidate	Votes	%
Republican	Theodore Christianson	286,279	69.79%
Republican	George E. Leach	123,897	30.21%
Total votes		410,176	100%

== Farmer-Labor primary ==
Johnson was the overwhelming favorite, but Davis gained support from within the Twin Cities.

=== Nominated ===
- Magnus Johnson, former senator

=== Eliminated in rimary ===
- Tom E. Davis, former mayor of Marshall

Farmer-Labor Party of Minnesota primary results
Party	Candidate	Votes	%
Farmer–Labor	Magnus Johnson	40,330	53.64%
Farmer–Labor	Tom E. Davis	34,853	46.36%
Total votes		410,176	100%

== Candidates ==
- Theodore Christianson, incumbent (Republican)
- Alfred Jacques, judge (Democratic)
- Magnus Johnson, former senator (Farmer-Labor)

== Campaigns ==
Christianson remained a popular incumbent, leading the Farmer-Labor to plan defensively. However, the Republicans were worried that overconfidence in their victory would result in a low enough Republican turnout to flip the election. In response, the Republican campaign had multiple popular figures tour the state for the purpose of rallying the public to register and boost turnout. Some of those touring included Frank Clague, Julius A. Schmahl. Those running for Republican office at the time, including Theodore Christianson, William I. Nolan, Melvin Maas, and Ray P. Chase, also campaigned together, touring the state and appearing at the same events. The tour was extensive, and by mid-October each candidate had split up to speak at two towns or at minimum per day, nearly every day until election day.

Jacques ran a progressive campaign. He found support from the campaign manager for Tom E. Davis, who had run for the Farmer-Labor nomination in 1924.

== Results ==
1926 gubernatorial election, Minnesota
Party	Candidate	Votes	%	±%
Republican	Theodore Christianson (incumbent)	395,779	56.49%	+7.78%
Farmer–Labor	Magnus Johnson	266,845	38.09%	−5.75%
Democratic	Alfred Jacques	38,008	5.42%	−0.49%
Majority		128,934	18.40%	
Turnout		700,632		
Republican hold		Swing		

== See also ==
- List of Minnesota gubernatorial elections
