= Carlos Avery =

American newspaper publisher and politician

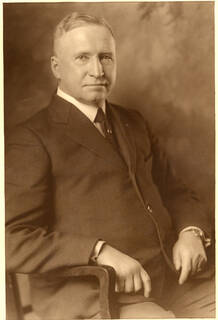
- Avery in 1921
- Born: January 25, 1868; Minooka, Illinois
- Died: October 5, 1930 (aged 62); Hutchinson, Minnesota
- Political party: Minnesota Democratic Party
- Spouse: Emma Irene Pennoyer
- Children: 2

Carlos Avery (January 25, 1868 – October 5, 1930) was an American newspaper publisher and politician in the state of Minnesota. Avery is best remembered as a longtime chief of the Minnesota Game and Fish Commission and was named the first Commissioner of the Game and Fish Commission when that position was created in August 1915. He is the namesake of the Carlos Avery Wildlife Management Area in that state.

Briefly serving as mayor of his hometown of Hutchinson, Minnesota, during the first decade of the 20th century, Avery was several times an unsuccessful candidate for high political office, losing in bids for the Minnesota State Senate in 1902, United States Congress in 1914, and for Governor of Minnesota in 1924, running as the nominee of the Democratic Party in each instance.

== Biography ==
=== Early years ===
Carlos Avery was born in Minooka, Grundy County, Illinois on January 25, 1868. He was raised on a farm near Hutchinson, Minnesota, and attended Hutchinson High School, from which he graduated in 1887. He was the son of Franklin Carlos Avery (1846–1915), an owner of harness racing horses who was murdered by a stable boy in Florida in December 1915.

After graduation, Avery became the editor of the Hutchinson Leader, a weekly newspaper established in 1881 with a pronounced Democratic Party political orientation. Avery was not squeamish about employment of his paper as a political foil, actively participating in the Third Congressional District Editorial Association with likeminded others as early as 1898. By 1903 Avery's paper had a circulation of about 2,200 copies, earning honors from the New York City trade publication Printers' Ink as one of the best country newspapers in the United States.

The young newspaper publisher emerged as a prominent business leader in Hutchinson, helping to establish the town's first telephone company in 1897.

Avery was married to the former Emma Irene Pennoyer (1869–1962), with whom he had two children.

=== Democratic activist ===
Avery was an activist in the Minnesota Democratic Party, elected in 1898 as a vice president of the League of Democratic Clubs of Minnesota, the group's chief representative in Minnesota's 3rd Congressional District. He was a delegate from McLeod County to the June 1898 fusion convention of the Democratic Party and the Peoples Party (Populists) which nominated John Lind for Governor of Minnesota.

In November 1902, Avery ran as a Democrat in a race for a seat in the Minnesota State Senate.

Avery was elected as mayor of Hutchinson in the civic election held in April 1905.

=== Minnesota Game and Fish Commission chief ===
In January 1907, Minnesota's Democratic Governor John Albert Johnson promoted Avery from his place on the board of the Minnesota Game and Fish Commission to the role of executive agent of that body, replacing former head Sam F. Fullerton. Avery retained Fullerton in the position of superintendent of fisheries, a position recently created by the Minnesota legislature, overseeing operations of the state's two fish hatcheries.

Under Avery's watch as executive agent, the Minnesota Game and Fish Commission for the first time collected data for a census of the population and distribution of deer, moose, caribou, and other big game in the state. Such information was to be put to use both for conservation and hunting purposes, according to Avery, helping to put management of the state's game population on a scientific basis. Avery also bolstered his conservationist credentials by actively seeking the construction of fish ladders at Minnesota's dams, in accordance with state law, and was aggressive in the prosecution of illegal fishermen.

Avery's term as executive agent ended at the end of 1909, and he announced that he would not seek reappointment. In his last year at the helm of the Game and Fish Commission, Avery noted that some 450 convictions were obtained for violations of the state's fish and game laws, leading to 1,365 days in jail and more than $7,200 in fines.

Avery returned for a second stint as executive agent of the Minnesota Game and Fish Commission in January 1915, appointed to the position by new Democratic Governor Winfield Scott Hammond. When the position of Commission of the Minnesota Game and Fish Commission was created by the state legislature, the new post to be launched effective August 1, 1915, Avery was appointed to a two-year term in that position by Governor Hammond. As Game and Fish Commissioner, Avery oversaw the establishment of Minnesota's first game refuges, called for by an act of the legislature, including a 20-acre parcel just north of Bemidji.

As Game and Fish Commissioner Avery also sought to bolster Minnesota's sport fisheries with the establishment of a third trout hatchery in 1915, aimed at the replenishment of dwindling natural stocks of fish in the rivers and streams of Northern Minnesota.

=== Political candidate ===
In 1914, Avery made a bid for election to United States Congress in Minnesota's 3rd Congressional District, challenging incumbent Representative Charles R. Davis. His effort proved unsuccessful, and he was appointed to a second stint at the helm of the Game and Fish Commission following his electoral defeat.

In June 1924, Avery was nominated by the Democratic Party of Minnesota as its candidate for Governor of Minnesota, heading the state party ticket. He finished a distant third, behind Republican Theodore Christianson and Farmer-Labor Party candidate Floyd B. Olson. Avery dismissed the Farmer-Labor party as a party of "misguided fledglings." Avery positioned himself as a reformer, hoping to be an alternative for progressive voters put off by the socialist factions of the Farmer-Labor party. Avery campaigned on an extensive policy of limited government and internal reform, a strong environmentalist policy (including supporting a state constitutional amendment mandating that forests could not be cleared for farmland) a massive irrigation effort for agriculture, new funding for highways and public transportation, and the expansion of welfare.

=== Later years ===
During his later years, Avery moved to Long Island, New York, and took a position as head of the American Game Protective and Propagation Association, with a national office in New York City. He remained at that post until the time of his death.

=== Death and legacy ===
Carlos Avery died October 4, 1930, at the age of 62.

Avery's pioneering efforts in conservation in the Upper Midwest led to President Franklin Roosevelt's designation for the Superior Forest reserve as a national game refuge in the 1930s. The Carlos Avery Wildlife Management Area, located thirty miles north of Minneapolis-St. Paul, was originally purchased by the Minnesota Conservation Commission in 1933 and was established as a WMA to support wildlife and public hunting.

== See also ==
- Carlos Avery Wildlife Management Area

== Works ==
- Personal and Public Record of Peter M. Ringdal, Crookston, Minn.: Democratic Candidate for Governor of Minnesota. St. Paul, MN: Carlos Avery, n.d. [1912].
- "Minnesota Lakes are 'Helping Hoover' : Conservation Methods Used in Fish Production and Propagation," Western Magazine, vol. 10, no. 5 (Nov. 1917), pp. 132–137.
- "Preservation and Proper Use of Our Lakes and Streams: One Important Feature of Reclamation and Conservation is Here Discussed," Western Magazine, vol. 11, no. 2 (Feb. 1918), pp. 55–65.
- "Minnesota's Experiment in State Fishing," Transactions of the American Fisheries Society, vol. 48, no. 1 (1918), pp. 57–54.
- "The Preservation of Wild Life," The Rotarian, vol. 18, no. 5 (May 1921), pp. 232, 286.
- "In Behalf of Our Waterfowl." n.c.: n.p., 1923.

Party political offices
Preceded by Edward Indrehus	Democratic nominee for Governor of Minnesota; 1924	Succeeded by Alfred Jacques
