= Renneke =

German surname

Renneke is a German surname.

== Geographical distribution ==
As of 2014, 68.9% of all known bearers of the surname Renneke were residents of Germany (frequency 1:127,347) and 29.3% of the United States (1:1,347,953).

In Germany, the frequency of the surname was higher than national average (1:127,347) in the following states:

1. North Rhine-Westphalia (1:32,077)
2. Hamburg (1:63,039)

== People ==
- Earl Renneke (1928–2021), American politician
- Bashkim Renneke (born 1992), German-Albanian professional footballer
