= Hutchinson High School =

Hutchinson High School may refer to:

- Hutchinson High School (Alaska) — Fairbanks, Alaska
- Hutchinson High School (Kansas) — Hutchinson, Kansas
- Hutchinson High School (Minnesota) — Hutchinson, Minnesota
- Hutchinson Central Technical High School — Buffalo, New York
