= 1930 United States Senate election in Minnesota =

- November 4, 1930
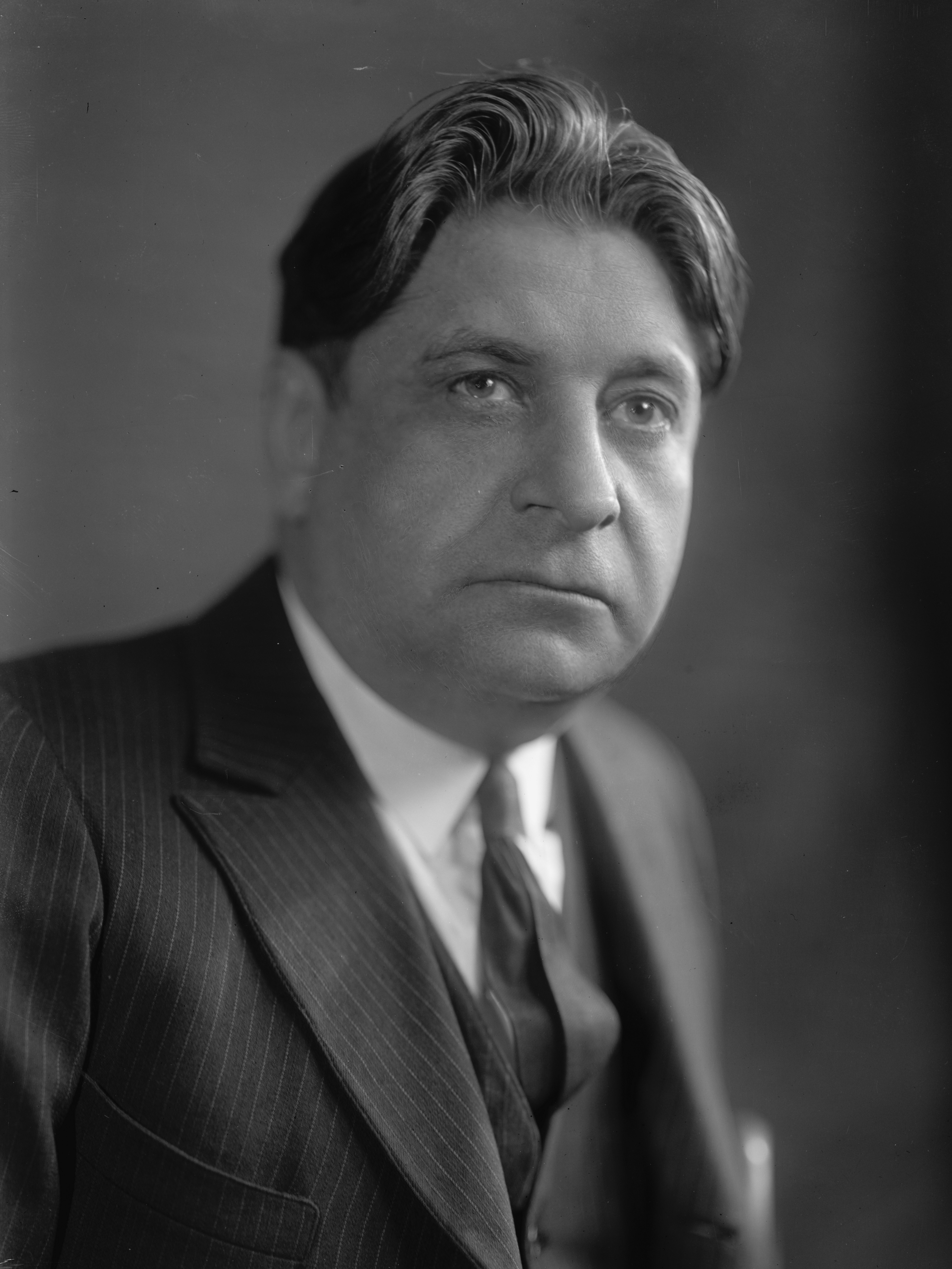

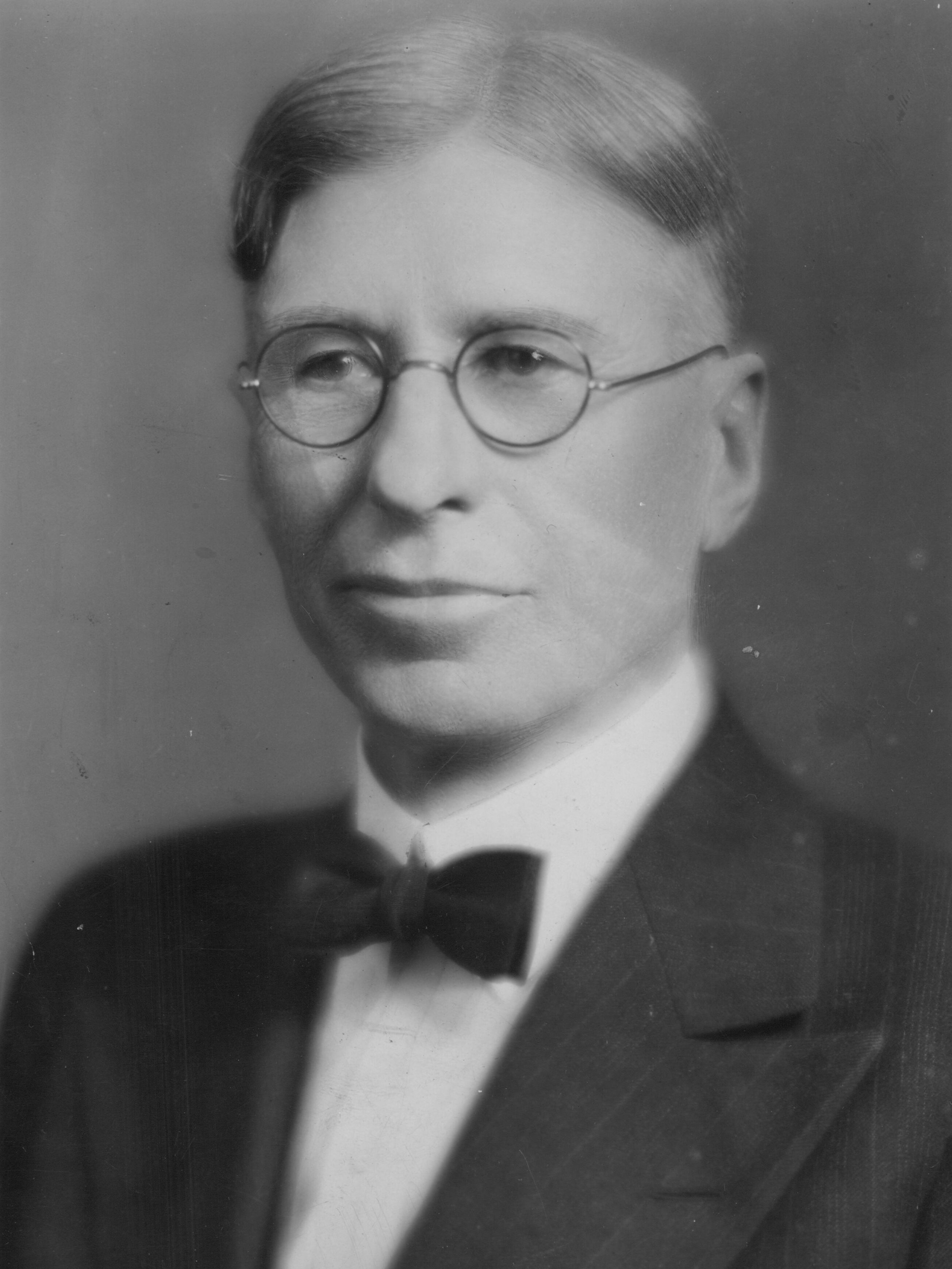

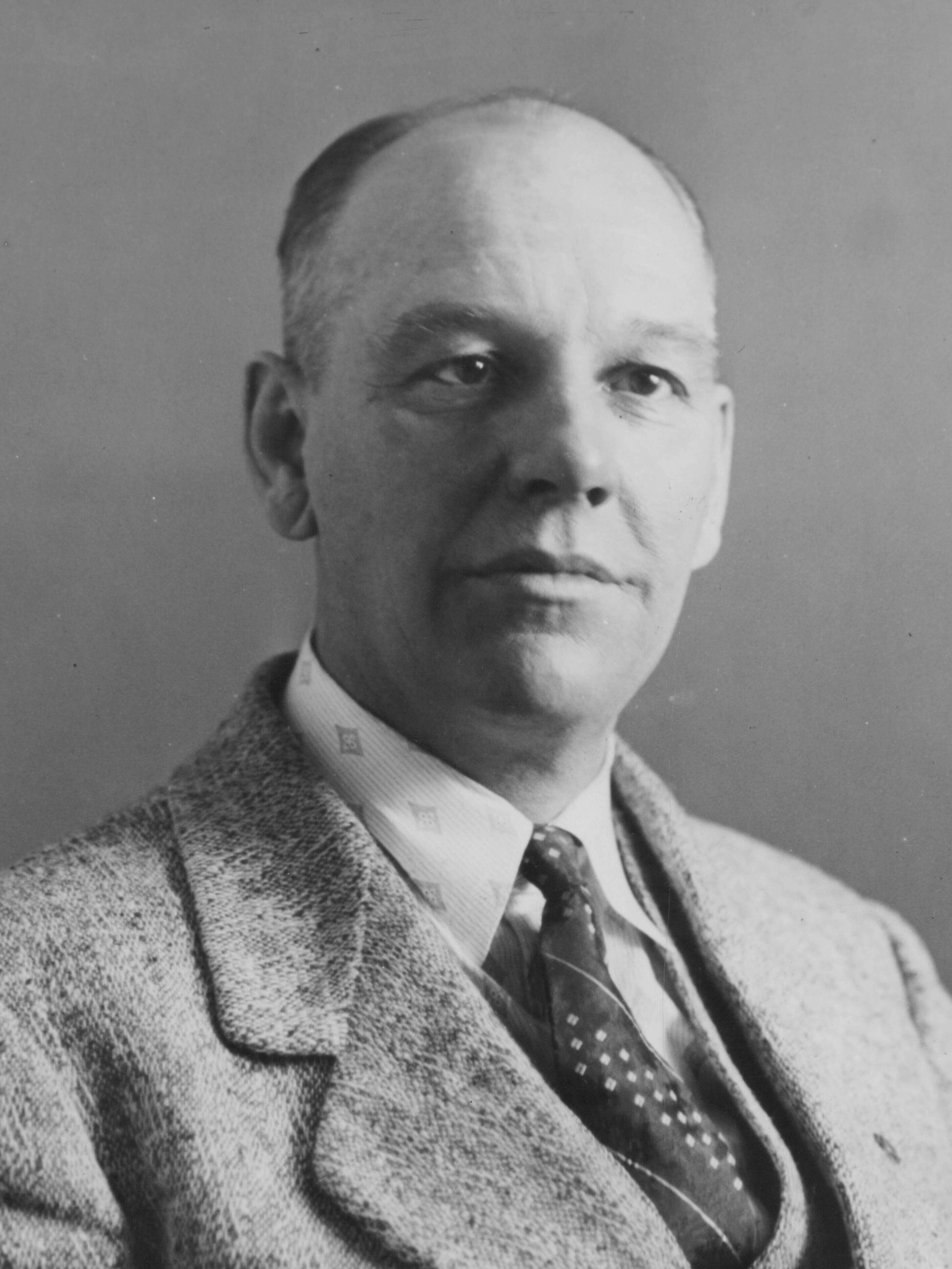
Nominee	Thomas D. Schall	Einar Hoidale	Ernest Lundeen
Party	Republican	Democratic	Farmer–Labor
Popular vote	293,626	282,018	178,671
Percentage	37.61%	36.13%	22.89%
- County results Schall: 30–40% 40–50% 50–60% 60–70% Hoidale: 30–40% 40–50% 50–60% Lundeen: 30–40% 40–50% 50–60%
U.S. senator before election
Thomas D. Schall
Republican
Elected U.S. Senator
Thomas D. Schall
Republican

The 1930 United States Senate election in Minnesota was held on Tuesday November 4, Incumbent Senator Thomas D. Schal defeated Einar Hoidale of the Minnesota Democratic Party and former United States Representative Ernest Lundeen of the Farmer–Labor Party of Minnesota to win a second term.

== Farmer–Labor primary ==
=== Candidates ===
==== Declared ====
- Ernest Lundeen, Former U.S. Representative from Minnesota's 5th congressional district (1917–1919), attorney from Minneapolis, former state Representative from the 42nd House District (1911–1915), and perennial candidate
- Knud Wefald, Former Republican state Representative from the 60th House District (1913–1915) and 49th House District (1915–1917), former Farmer-Labor U.S. Representative from Minnesota's 9th congressional district (1923–1927), resident of Moorhead

=== Results ===
Farmer–Labor primary election results
Party	Candidate	Votes	%
Farmer–Labor	Ernest Lundeen	75,050	65.47%
Farmer–Labor	Knud Wefald	39,589	34.53%
Total votes		114,639	100.00%

== Republican primary ==
=== Candidates ===
==== Declared ====
- Theodore Christianson, 21st Governor of Minnesota since 1925, owner and publisher of the Dawson Sentinel, former president of the Dawson Village Council (1910–1911), state Representative from the 24th House District (1915–1925)
- Thomas D. Schall, Incumbent U.S. Senator since 1925
- John F. Selb, Former State Representative from the 35th House District (1905–1907; 1909–1911), former registrar of the Railroad and Warehouse Commission, Minneapolis attorney

=== Results ===
Republican primary election results
Party	Candidate	Votes	%
Republican	Thomas D. Schall (Incumbent)	266,736	57.40%
Republican	Theodore Christianson	173,390	37.31%
Republican	John F. Selb	24,573	5.29%
Total votes		464,699	100.00%

== General election ==
=== Candidates ===
==== Communist ====
- Rudolph Harju, Resident of New York Mills, nominated by petition

==== Democratic ====
- Einar Hoidale, Attorney from Minneapolis, former prosecuting attorney of Brown County (1900–1906), former judge advocate of the state militia (1900–1908), Democratic candidate for Minnesota's 5th Congressional District CD in 1910 and 1912, Democratic nominee for the 5th CD in 1929

==== Independent ====
- Charles A. Lund, Banker and attorney from Vining, state Senator from the 50th Senate District (1923–1931), Republican candidate for Treasurer in 1920, Republican candidate for Lieutenant Governor in 1930

=== Results ===
General election results
Party	Candidate	Votes	%
Republican	Thomas D. Schall (Incumbent)	293,626	37.61%
Democratic	Einar Hoidale	282,018	36.13%
Farmer–Labor	Ernest Lundeen	178,671	22.89%
Independent	Charles A. Lund	20,669	2.65%
Communist	Rudolph Harju	5,645	0.72%
Total votes		780,629	100.00%
Majority		11,608	1.48%
Republican hold			

== See also ==
- United States Senate elections, 1930 and 1931
