= 1928 Minnesota gubernatorial election =

- November 6, 1928
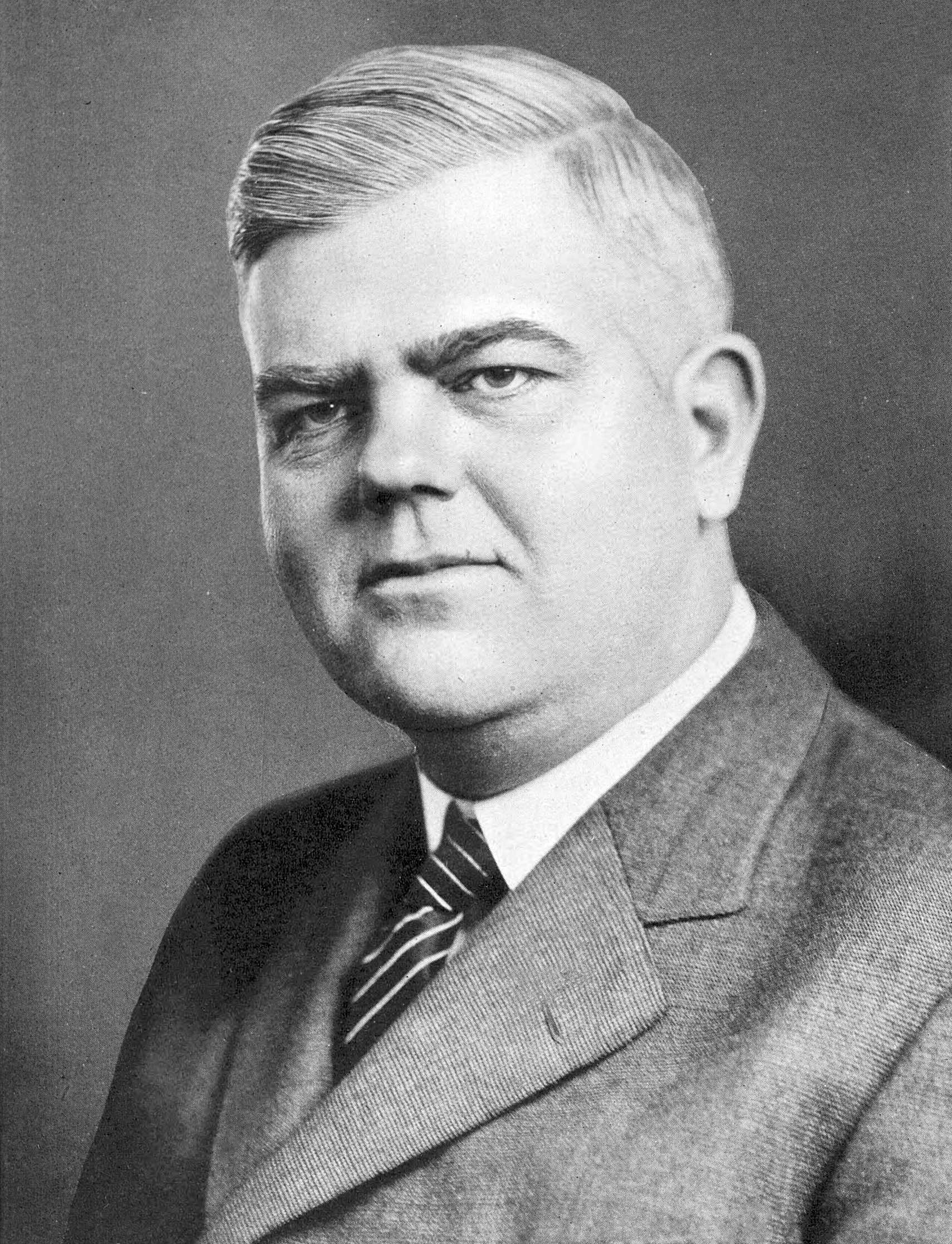

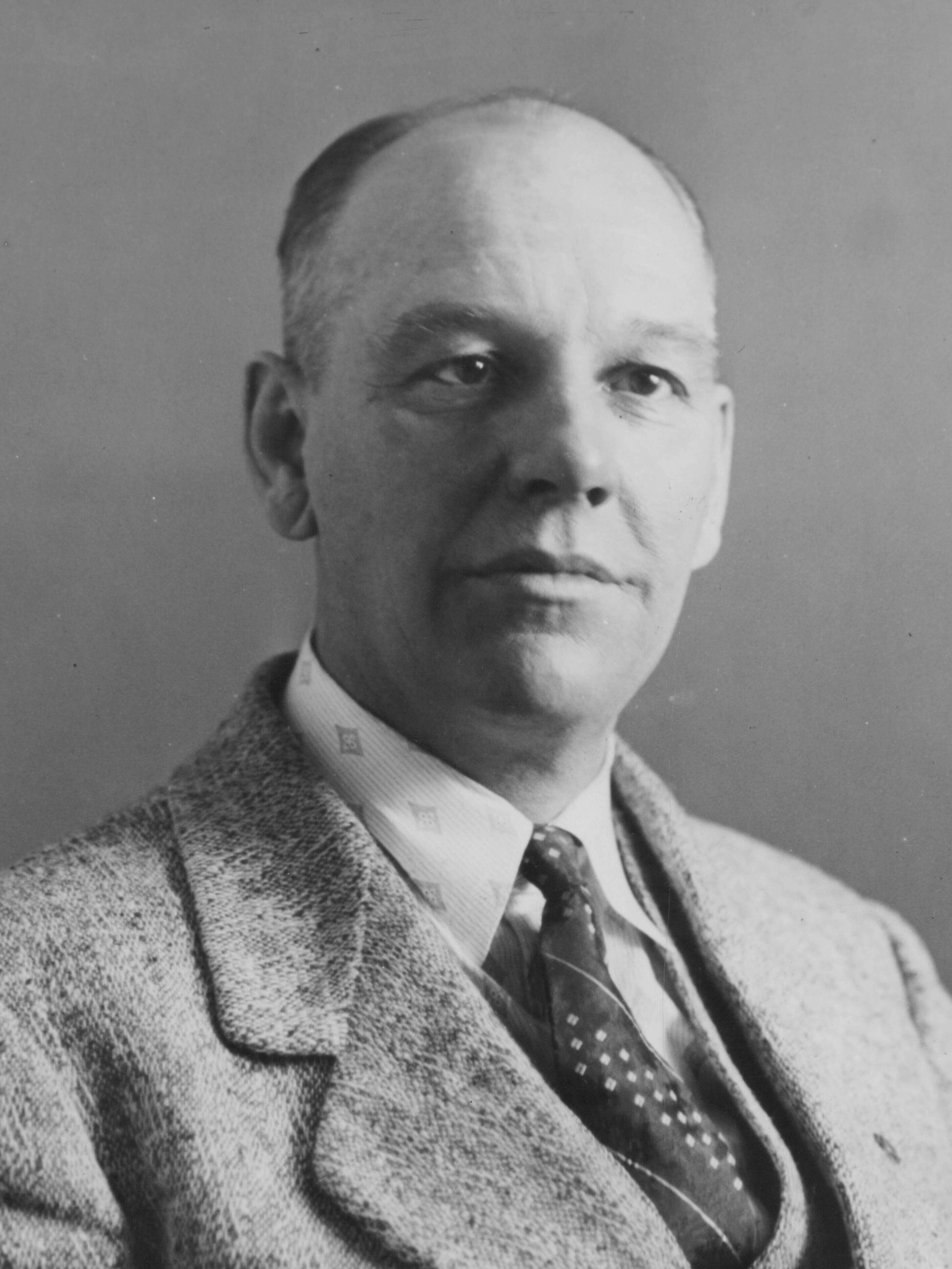

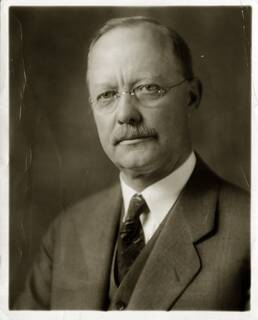
Nominee	Theodore Christianson	Ernest Lundeen	Andrew Nelson
Party	Republican	Farmer–Labor	Democratic
Popular vote	549,857	227,193	213,734
Percentage	55.00%	22.72%	21.38%
- County results Christianson: 30–40% 40–50% 50–60% 60–70% 70–80% Lundeen: 40–50% Nelson: 40–50%
Governor before election
Theodore Christianson
Republican
Elected Governor
Theodore Christianson
Republican

The 1928 Minnesota gubernatorial election took place on November 6, 1928. Republican Party of Minnesota candidate Theodore Christianson defeated Farmer–Labor Party challenger Ernest Lundeen.

== Republican primary ==
Christianson launched his bid for a third term very early, in January of 1928. The primary was held on June 18, 1928. Christianson's only opposition was former State Attorney General George T. Simpson. Christianson was renominated with a landslide 77.55% of the vote to Simpson's 22.45%.

== Farmer-Labor primary ==
Lundeen narrowly won the primary over Dr. Louis A. Fritsche, with 53.11% to Fritsche's 46.89%. Lundeen was the first gubernatorial candidate to campaign over the radio for a primary election.

== Candidates ==
- J.O. Bentall, former state secretary of the Illinois Socialist Party (Socialist)
- Harris A. Brandborg, farmer (Industrial)
- Theodore Christianson, incumbent (Republican)
- Ernest Lundeen, former member of the U.S. House of Representatives (Farmer-Labor)
- Andrew Nelson, former assistant state superintendent of public instruction (Democratic)

== Campaigns ==
Christianson was the first gubernatorial candidate to begin campaigning over the radio for the general election. In late September, rumors began to circulate that Lundeen would drop out of the race, potentially in favor of Nelson. Lundeen denied these rumors and continued his campaign. On October 20, 1928, Lundeen's keynote speech had to be delayed after his campaign car skidded off a road near Hinckley and two tired exploded. Lundeen was uninjured.

== Results ==
1928 gubernatorial election, Minnesota
Party	Candidate	Votes	%	±%
Republican	Theodore Christianson (incumbent)	549,857	55.00%	−1.49%
Farmer–Labor	Ernest Lundeen	227,193	22.72%	−15.36%
Democratic	Andrew Nelson	213,734	21.38%	+15.95%
Workers Communist	J. O. Bentall	5,760	0.58%	n/a
Industrial	Harris A. Brandborg	3,279	0.33%	n/a
Majority		322,664	32.27%	
Turnout		999,823		
Republican hold		Swing		

== See also ==
- List of Minnesota gubernatorial elections
