= Hutchinson High School (Minnesota) =

Location
- 1200 Roberts Road; Hutchinson, MN 55350; United States
- Coordinates: 44.8845°N 94.3930°W

Information
- Type: Public High School
- Established: 1877
- Superintendent: Daniel Deitte
- Principal: Jennifer Telecky
- Teaching staff: 50.09 (FTE)
- Grades: 9–12
- Enrollment: 863 (2024–2025)
- Student to teacher ratio: 17.23
- Campus type: Rural
- Colors: Black and Yellow
- Mascot: Tiger
- Feeder schools: West Elementary School, Tiger Elementary School, Park Elementary School, Hutchinson Middle School.
- Website: isd423.org

Hutchinson Senior High School was founded in the fall of 1877 in Hutchinson, Minnesota, United States. The school has over 17,000 graduates since its inception. [17,095 through 2023] The first graduating class included H. H. Bonniwell.

Today, HHS graduates anywhere from 200-240 graduates per year. This rate has held fairly steady for the past 50 years. The first class over 100 was in 1942 (110) and the first class of 200 students occurred 23 years later in 1965. The last graduating class under 200 was in 1992. Over that time, Hutchinson HS has had a remarkably stable population of between 800-1100 students. Currently, the enrollment of Hutchinson HS is above 900 and expects to be there through the near future.

== History ==
- The first HHS graduates were in 1878. High school education generally was exclusive to private tutoring prior to this.
- In 1881, the Hutchinson school district became one of the first to receive state money to provide high school study.
- In 1890, the Hutchinson school district had 529 pupils, while only graduating 4 students. High school education did not gain popularity until the turn of the century.
- In 1913, a Normal School was started. The normal school took place in the summer after graduation and allowed many people to become certified teachers in a six-week program. 50% of the graduating class went to the Normal school in 1915-17. The Normal School continued to operate until 1947. During this period, the teacher training school graduated 10-15 students yearly.
- The first documented valedictorian was E. R. Dennis in the Class of 1912. The practice of naming a valedictorian and salutatorian was ended by Principal Scott Douglas in the year 2000.
- The Park building was commissioned in 1938 and served as the high school from 1938-1960. After that, it became the elementary school. Park was recently changed from a Grades 2-5 building to only a Grades 4-5 building in 2022.
- In the fall of 1961, Hutchinson Senior HS moved to the School St. location and continued operating as the Grades 7-12 building from 1961-1988, and the Grades 9-12 building from 1988–present. A new remodeled high school debuted during the 2017-2018 school year.

== Graduation classes ==
Year	Grad#	Year	Grad#	Year	Grad#	Year	Grad#	Year	Grad#	Year	Grad#	Year	Grad#	Year	Grad#	Year	Grad#	Year	Grad#	Year	Grad#
1878	4	1897	16	1911	36	1925	65	1939	82	1953	104	1967	185	1981	213	1995	200	2009	221	2023	220
1881	1	1898	14	1912	41	1926	51	1940	82	1954	95	1968	194	1982	216	1996	205	2010	234	2024	
1884	6	1899	18	1913	49	1927	53	1941	95	1955	104	1969	204	1983	214	1997	212	2011	212	2025	
1885	8	1900	16	1914	32	1928	56	1942	110	1956	115	1970	223	1984	195	1998	214	2012	203	2026	
1886	1	1901	24	1915	48	1929	47	1943	95	1957	100	1971	208	1985	187	1999	220	2013	204	2027	
1887	12	1902	29	1916	39	1930	66	1944	77	1958	129	1972	170	1986	192	2000	219	2014	219	2028	
1888	1	1903	35	1917	32	1931	54	1945	76	1959	120	1973	195	1987	201	2001	227	2015	238	2029	
1890	4	1904	39	1918	47	1932	71	1946	96	1960	142	1974	204	1988	226	2002	221	2016	208	2030	
1891	9	1905	48	1919	52	1933	56	1947	76	1961	152	1975	187	1989	197	2003	239	2017	206	2031	
1892	2	1906	33	1920	39	1934	62	1948	114	1962	156	1976	184	1990	219	2004	230	2018	212	2032	
1893	3	1907	32	1921	50	1935	62	1949	88	1963	146	1977	211	1991	170	2005	236	2019	205	2033	
1894	2	1908	33	1922	41	1936	65	1950	78	1964	172	1978	215	1992	190	2006	231	2020	197	2034	
1895	10	1909	23	1923	52	1937	67	1951	98	1965	200	1979	228	1993	206	2007	244	2021	221	2035	
1896	4	1910	37	1924	58	1938	64	1952	82	1966	184	1980	217	1994	210	2008	229	2022	219	2036	

== Notable alumni ==
- Carlos Avery (1868-1930), first Commissioner of the Minnesota Game and Fish Commission. Namesake of the Carlos Avery State Wildlife Management Area. Class of 1887.
- John Bernhagen, Minnesota Legislator, (1969-1992). Class of 1952. Graduated #12 in his class of 82.
- Harlow "Bonnie" Bonniwell, Minnesota Legislator (1915-1935). Part of the first graduating class in 1878.
- Mitch Erickson, Offensive Guard at South Dakota State from 2004-2007, Pro football player from 2008-2012 in the NFL (Practice Squad) and CFL
- Colleen Gray, (née Delores Jensen) big screen actress from the 1940s and 1950s. Class of 1939. Graduated #3 in her class of 82.
- Arthur A. Hahn, Minnesota state senator and businessman
- Les Kouba, 1957–58 and 1967-68 Federal Duck Stamp winner and celebrated wildlife artist. Les was in the Class of 1935, but left school during his junior year to attend art school in Minneapolis. Les Kouba Art
- Greg Murtha, Football player at the University of Minnesota, played in the NFL in 1982
- Lydon Murtha, Offensive Tackle at Nebraska from 2005-2008, NFL Player with the Miami Dolphins
- Harold Popp, Minnesota Legislator (1958-1969). Pharmacist. Married popular teacher Winnifred Ruth in 1941. Both were killed in a car accident in 1969. Class of 1921
- Nate Swift, Record-setting receiver at Nebraska from 2005-2008, NFL Practice Squad player, Denver and Jacksonville (2009)
- Lindsay Whalen, basketball player for the University of Minnesota, Connecticut Sun, and Minnesota Lynx. Two-time Olympic gold medalist in basketball (2012, 2016) and former head coach of the University of Minnesota's women's basketball team
- John Zeleny, Class of 1888, BS Cambridge, University of MN Physicist 1906-1951, invented Zeleny Electroscope, President, American Physical Society, 1940

== Feeder schools ==
- West Elementary
- Tiger Elementary
- Park Elementary
- Hutchinson Middle School
