= Ernest Lundeen =

American politician with Nazi affiliations (1878–1940)

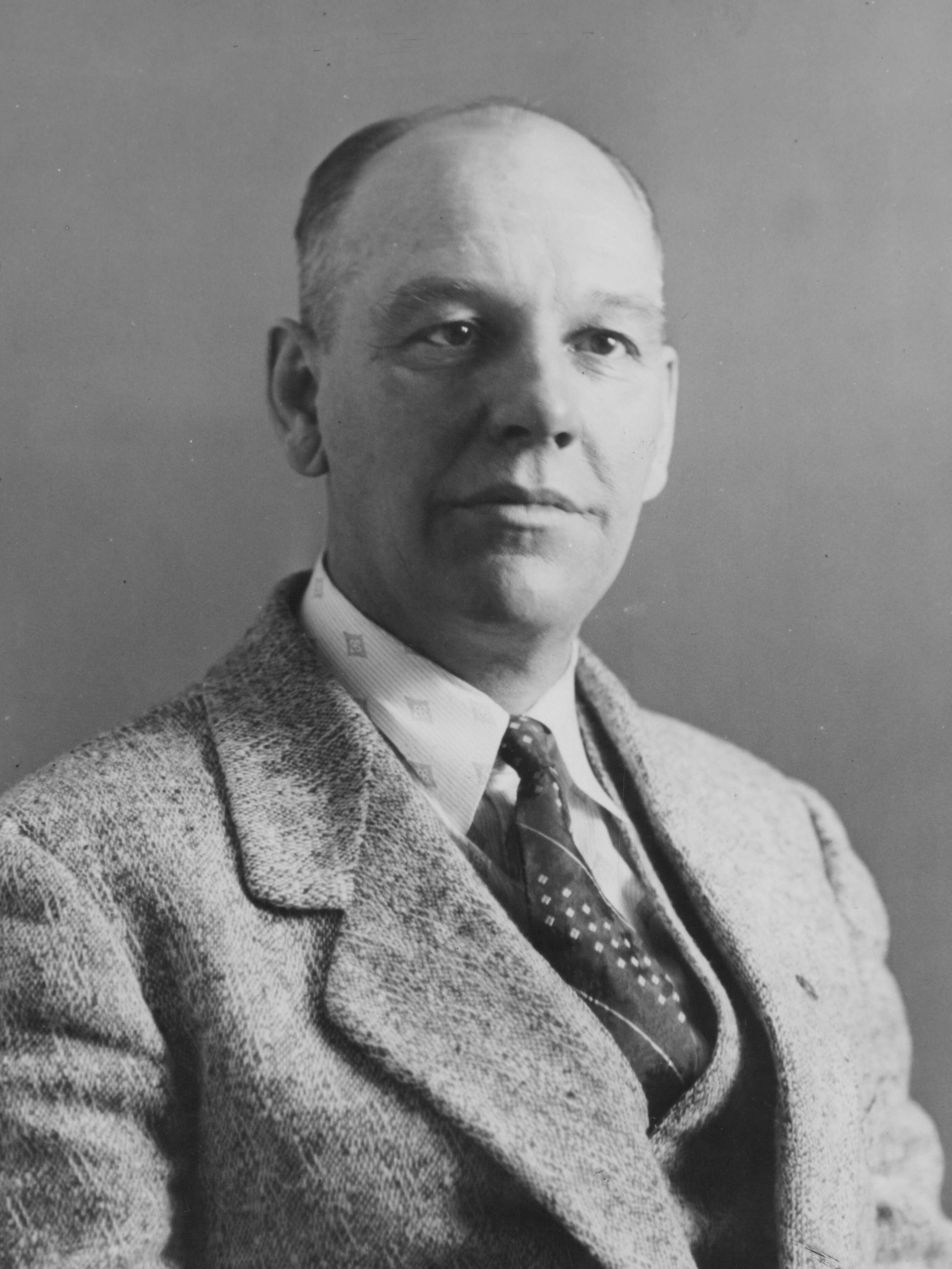
- Lundeen in 1929

United States Senator from Minnesota
- In office January 3, 1937 – August 31, 1940
- Preceded by: Guy V. Howard
- Succeeded by: Joseph H. Ball

Member of the U.S. House of Representatives from Minnesota
- In office March 4, 1933 – January 3, 1937
- Preceded by: General ticket adopted
- Succeeded by: Henry Teigan
- Constituency: General Ticket Seat Eight (1933-1935); 3rd district (1935-1937)
- In office March 4, 1917 – March 3, 1919
- Preceded by: George Ross Smith
- Succeeded by: Walter Newton
- Constituency: 5th district

Member of the Minnesota House of Representatives from the 42nd district
- In office January 3, 1911 – January 4, 1915
- Preceded by: William Campbell and John Godspeed
- Succeeded by: John B. Sanborn Jr. and George Sudheimer

Personal details
- Born: August 4, 1878 Beresford, Dakota Territory, U.S.
- Died: August 31, 1940 (aged 62) Lovettsville, Virginia, U.S.
- Cause of death: Plane crash
- Party: Republican (before 1925); Farmer-Labor (after 1925)
- Spouse: Norma Lundeen (m. 1919)
- Children: 2
- Education: Carleton College; University of Minnesota Law School
- Occupation: Lawyer

Military service
- Allegiance: United States
- Branch/service: United States Army
- Years of service: 1898
- Rank: Private
- Unit: Company B, 12th Minnesota Volunteer Regiment
- Battles/wars: Spanish–American War

Ernest Lundeen (August 4, 1878 – August 31, 1940) was an American lawyer and politician who represented Minnesota in the United States House of Representatives from 1917 to 1919 and 1933 to 1937, and in the United States Senate from 1937 until his death in 1940. He was a member of the Republican Party before joining the Minnesota Farmer–Labor Party. He opposed American involvement in both World War I and World War II. At the end of his life, he became controversial for his close ties with George Sylvester Viereck, a Nazi agent in the U.S.

A veteran of the Spanish–American War, Lundeen got his start in politics when he served in the Minnesota House of Representatives between 1911 and 1914. He was elected to the U.S. Congress in 1916 as the representative from Minnesota's 5th congressional district. However, when seeking reelection in 1918, he was defeated in the Republican primary due to his unpopular opposition to American entry into World War I.

On August 31, 1940, Senator Lundeen and 24 other passengers died in the Lovettsville air disaster plane crash near Lovettsville, Virginia. At the time, he was the subject of a probe by the Federal Bureau of Investigation for his alleged links to Nazi Germany. Investigations into the cause of the crash turned up nothing conclusive.

== Early life and education ==
Ernest Lundeen was born on August 4, 1878, on his father's homestead in Brooklyn Township near Beresford, Lincoln County, Dakota Territory. His father, C. H. Lundeen, was an early pioneer who was credited with the naming of Brooklyn Township and the establishment of the school and other local institutions.

Most of Ernest Lundeen's siblings died during a diphtheria epidemic during the 1880s. In 1896, Lundeen and his family moved from their Brooklyn homestead to Harcourt, Iowa, and then to Minnesota. Lundeen served in the United States Army in the 12th Minnesota Volunteer Regiment during the Spanish–American War.

In 1901, Lundeen graduated from Carleton College and studied law at the University of Minnesota Law School. In May 1906, he was admitted to the Minnesota bar.

== Early political career (1911–36) ==
Lundeen served in the Minnesota House of Representatives from 1911 to 1915. He represented the 42nd district, which served Hennepin County.

=== United States House of Representatives (1917–19) ===
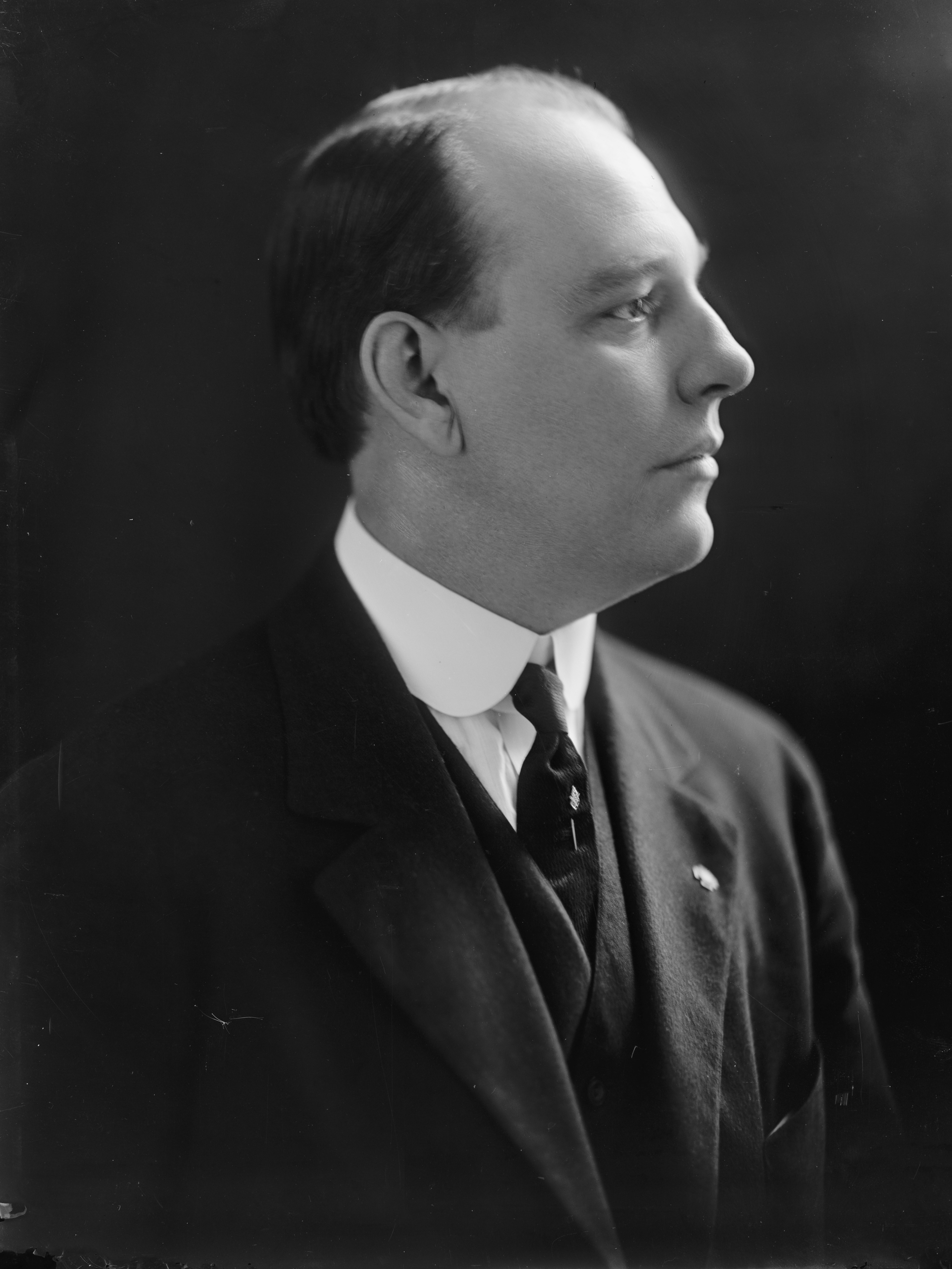
Portrait by Harris & Ewing c. 1917–1919

Lundeen first ran for United States Congress in 1914 but was unsuccessful. Then, in 1916, he was elected to the 65th U.S. Congress, representing Minnesota's 5th congressional district based in Minneapolis. On April 6, 1917, he was one of 50 congressmen to vote against the American declaration of war against Germany. He continued to oppose the war while it was being fought. Owing to the unpopularity of his isolationist, anti-war stance, he lost renomination in the 1918 Republican primary to the eventual election winner, Walter Newton. Once, while Lundeen was making a speech in 1918 about foreign policy, an angry crowd in Ortonville, Minnesota carried him off the speaker's platform and forced him into the refrigerated rail car of a departing train.

=== Unsuccessful bids for office ===
In the 1920s, Lundeen was repeatedly unsuccessful in his runs for political office:

- Lundeen ran for the same seat again in 1920 but failed to win the Republican nomination. He ran in the general election as an independent candidate but finished third with 10.0% of the total vote.
- In 1922, Lundeen challenged incumbent United States Senator Frank B. Kellogg for the Republican nomination for Senate. He received 123,765 votes in the Republican primary (33.54% of the total).
- In 1923, Lundeen ran in the special election for United States Senate but finished seventh out of nine candidates in the Republican primary, winning only 5,851 votes (3.40% of the total).
- In 1924, Lundeen ran unsuccessfully for Chief Justice of the Minnesota Supreme Court.
- By 1926, Lundeen had switched his affiliation to the Minnesota Farmer–Labor Party and ran in that year's election for Minnesota's 10th congressional district. As the Farmer–Labor nominee in this more rural and exurban district, he finished a distant second to incumbent Republican Godfrey G. Goodwin with 34.5% of the total vote.
- In 1930, Lundeen was the Farmer–Labor nominee for United States Senate, challenging incumbent Republican Thomas D. Schall. He finished third behind Schall and Democratic nominee Einar Hoidale with 22.89% of the vote.

=== United States House of Representatives (1933–37) ===
Lundeen was elected to the U.S. House again in 1932 and served in the 73rd and 74th Congresses.

In 1934, during the 73rd Congress, Lundeen sponsored the Workers' Unemployment Insurance Bill. The bill embodied a far-reaching unemployment insurance and social insurance program formulated by the Communist Party in 1930 and openly and vigorously advocated by the Party for the next several years. Despite the bill's Communist origins, the Party mustered considerable support for it, including from union locals, international unions, and state labor federations. The bill attracted support from liberals dissatisfied with the less generous and much less radical Wagner-Lewis Bill (which became the Social Security Act). With Lundeen's help, a subcommittee of the Labor Committee heard testimony from 80 witnesses on the benefits of the bill and the suffering of the unemployed. Many were Communists, including Party chairman Earl Browder. The bill was narrowly voted out of the Labor Committee, but it was killed by House leadership, which wanted no competition for Wagner-Lewis.

== U.S. Senator (1937–40) ==
=== 1936 election ===
In 1936, the Farmer–Labor Party nominated Floyd B. Olson, the popular incumbent Governor of Minnesota, for the open United States Senate seat vacated by Schall's death. However, Olson died of stomach cancer at the age of 44 on August 22. The state central committee of the Farmer–Labor Party selected Lundeen to run in his place, and he won a landslide election over Republican former Governor Theodore Christianson.

=== Term in office ===
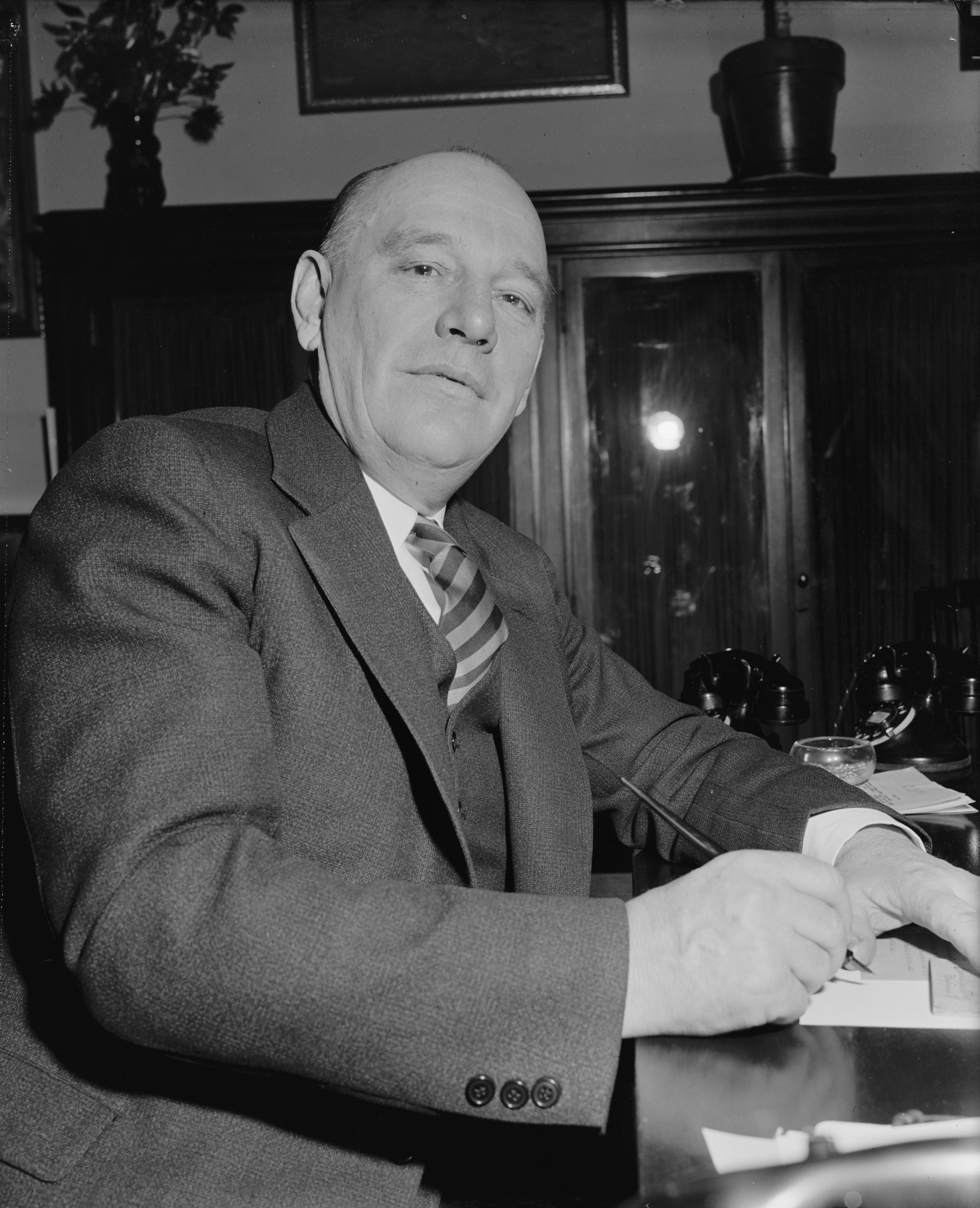
Portrait by Harris & Ewing, April 1940

Senator Lundeen served in the 75th U.S. Congress starting on January 3, 1937, and then in the 76th Congress until his death. Initially, he displayed sympathies with the Communist Party. For example, in late 1936, Senator-elect Lundeen addressed a meeting of the "Friends of the Soviet Union" at Madison Square Garden as Tovarishchi ("Comrades"). But he remained strongly isolationist and was later denounced by Earl Browder as a reactionary.

It was Lundeen's "passionate embrace of isolationism" that began to align him more with Americans who backed Nazi Germany. He had frequent contact with George Sylvester Viereck, a leading Nazi agent in the U.S. During his first term in the House of Representatives, Lundeen had contributed to Viereck's American Weekly. After giving Sen. Lundeen millions of dollars in bribes, Viereck often used the Senator's office and "sometimes dictated speeches for Lundeen, openly using the Senator's telephones to obtain material from Hans Thomsen at the [German] embassy." Some of these speeches were markedly pro-German and pro-isolationist. Viereck would have Lundeen's staff print thousands, and in certain cases, millions of copies of the speeches, which would then be distributed to the public.

Lundeen was the chair and founder of the Make Europe Pay War Debts Committee (later dubbed the Islands for War Debts Committee), which urged the seizure of British territories in the West Indies as a means of settling Britain's debts to the United States from WWI. It was likely an isolationist public relations tactic, reminding Americans that the U.S. should not lend more assistance to a country that was already in debt to them.

On June 14, 1939, Lundeen joined a civilian and press delegation aboard USS Hammann for its sea trials off Fire Island. The ship reached a maximum speed of 40 knots, came to a complete stop in 58 seconds, and then travelled in reverse at 20 knots. He said the experience was "astounding" and it showed that American ship designers "need bow to none."

While in office, Lundeen required his aides to pay him a portion of their paychecks, threatening to fire them if they did not comply.

He vehemently opposed the Selective Training and Service Act of 1940.

== Death and investigation ==
On the afternoon of August 31, 1940, Lundeen was a passenger on Flight 19 of Pennsylvania Central Airlines, flying from Washington, D.C. to Detroit. The plane crashed near Lovettsville, Virginia, and all 25 persons on board were killed. Lundeen was buried at Fort Snelling National Cemetery.

Also on board Flight 19 were "a Special Agent of the FBI, a second FBI employee, and a prosecutor from the Criminal Division of the U.S. Department of Justice." Director J. Edgar Hoover denied that the FBI agents on the plane had Lundeen under surveillance.

The Civil Aeronautics Board launched a week-long investigation regarding the cause of the crash, but found no definitive answers. A coroner's inquest in the Virginia county where the crash occurred concluded it was probably weather-related. There was a violent thunderstorm in progress, and the crash may have resulted from a lightning strike on the plane, possibly combined with pilot error while flying into wind shear.

Minnesota Governor Harold Stassen appointed Joseph H. Ball to fill Lundeen's Senate seat. Although Ball continued his predecessor's anti-New Deal stance, he took a different foreign policy position by voting for FDR's Lend-Lease program as "a barrier between us and whatever designs Hitler and his allies may have on this continent."

In 2022, Rachel Maddow released a podcast series titled Ultra, which explored Lundeen's complicity in Nazi Germany's intelligence and propaganda operations in the U.S. during the 12 to 18 months immediately preceding America's entry into World War II. At the time of his death, the FBI was investigating Lundeen's ties to George Sylvester Viereck, who was working in the U.S. to spread pro-Hitler and anti-Semitic propaganda.

After the plane crash, Lundeen's wife Norma tried to clear his name by covering up his involvement with the Nazi regime. Within two days after the crash, she travelled to his office in the Capitol to retrieve the "Viereck files". Within a year after the tragedy, several journalists started reporting that Lundeen's speeches had been ghostwritten by Viereck. Norma Lundeen sought to block that narrative by claiming that "no one wrote [her] husband's speeches" and by threatening to sue one of the journalists reporting it. When she was called as a defense witness during Viereck's trial for violating the Foreign Agents Registration Act, she falsely testified that while she indeed took the Viereck files, the files had now disappeared due to a burglary at their residence. It was later discovered that the files were actually stored in the Lundeen family archives.

== See also ==
- List of members of the United States Congress who died in office (1900–1949)

Party political offices
Preceded by Magnus Johnson	Farmer–Labor nominee for Governor of Minnesota; 1928	Succeeded by Floyd B. Olson
Preceded by Magnus Johnson	Farmer–Labor nominee for U.S. Senator from Minnesota (Class 2); 1930	Succeeded by Floyd B. Olson
Preceded by Floyd B. Olson	Farmer–Labor nominee for U.S. Senator from Minnesota (Class 2); 1936	Succeeded by Al Hansen
U.S. House of Representatives
Preceded by George Ross Smith	U.S. Representative from Minnesota's 5th congressional district 1917–1919	Succeeded by Walter Newton
Preceded by General ticket Adopted	U.S. Representative from Minnesota; General ticket Eighth Seat; 1933–1935	Succeeded by General ticket Abolished
Preceded by General ticket Abolished	U.S. Representative from Minnesota's 3rd congressional district 1935–1937	Succeeded by Henry Teigan
U.S. Senate
Preceded by Guy V. Howard	U.S. senator (Class 2) from Minnesota; 1937–1940; Served alongside: Henrik Shipstead	Succeeded by Joseph H. Ball
