= Louis A. Fritsche =

"Minnesota medical doctor and politician"

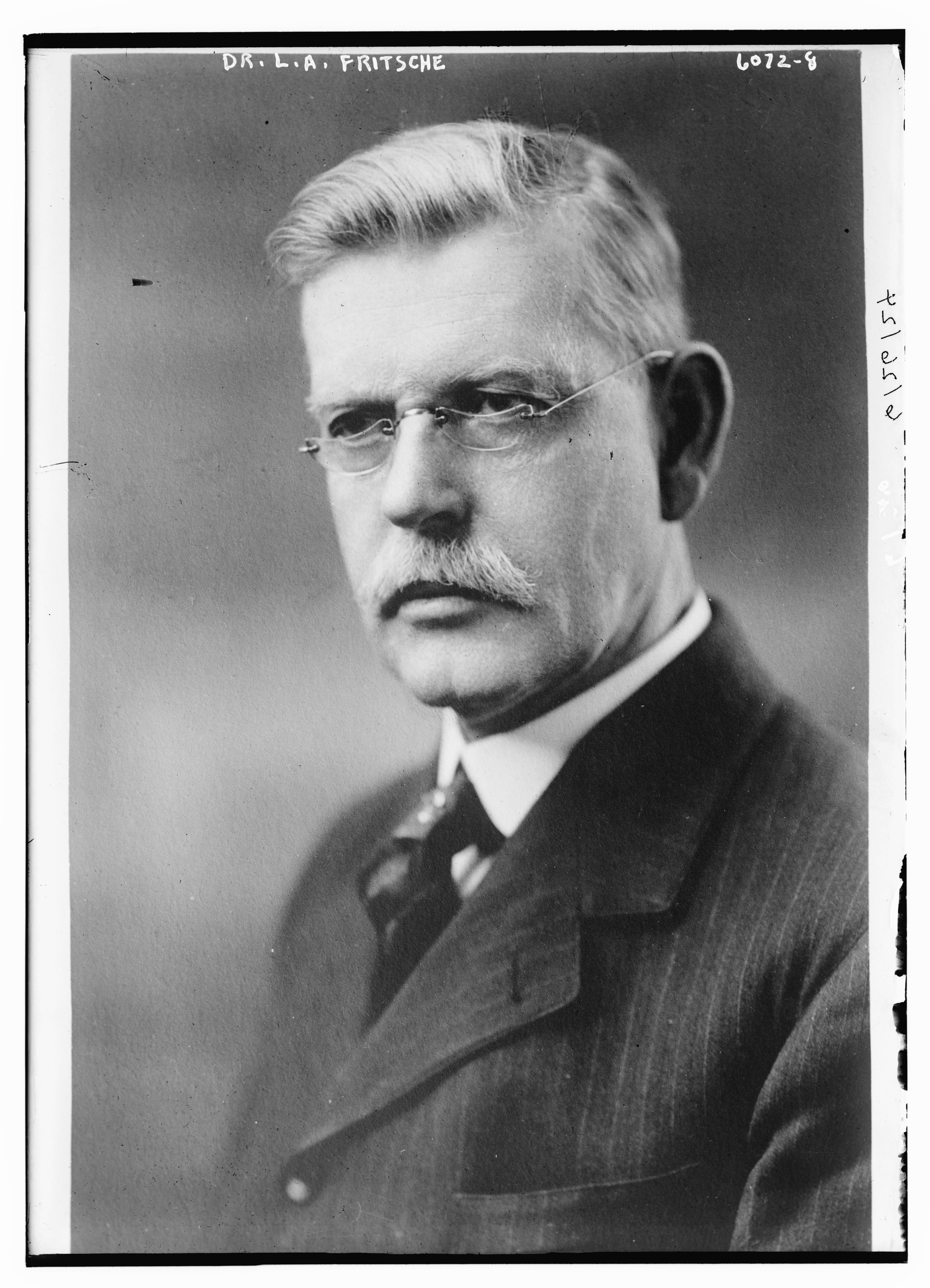
- Fritsch c.1920's

Mayor of New Ulm, Minnesota
- In office 1912–1920
- Preceded by: John Peter Graff

Coroner of Brown County, Minnesota
- In office 1900-1905; 1909-1911

Personal details
- Born: Louis Albert Fritsche; May 28, 1862 Lafayette Township, Minnesota
- Died: June 18, 1931 (aged 69) New Ulm, Minnesota
- Resting place: New Ulm City Cemetery
- Other political affiliations: Farmer–Labor Party
- Relations: William Pfaender (Father in-law)
- Education: University of Michigan; Humboldt University of Berlin

Military service
- Allegiance: United States of America
- Branch/service: Minnesota National Guard
- Years of service: 1907-1913
- Rank: Major

Louis Albert Fritsche (May 28, 1862 - June 18, 1931) was a Minnesota politician, medical doctor, and the mayor of New Ulm, Minnesota from 1912 until 1920. During World War I Fritsche was suspended from his position as mayor and barred from holding higher political office by the Minnesota Commission of Public Safety for holding opposing views on World War I and being a part of the broader anti-war movement.

== Early life ==
Louis Albert Fritsche was born on May 28, 1862 in Lafayette Township in Nicollet County, Minnesota, he was the son of Carl Frederick "Fred" Wilhelm Fritsche and Louise Wilhelmine Lillie who were both German American immigrants to Minnesota Territory who later settled land north of New Ulm, Minnesota. Fritsche's father Frederick was one of the founders of New Ulm and took part in the military expedition to the Yellow Medicine River to arrest Inkpaduta for the Spirit Lake Massacre in March 1857. Frederick was later a Corporal and member of the Lafayette Company of militia during the Dakota War of 1862 under Lieutenant Fidel Diepolder and fought against the Dakota people during the Battles of New Ulm. Frederick was later involved in county politics and became the municipal clerk of Lafayette Township, and later the county treasurer of Nicolette County from 1872-1882.

Fritsche grew up near St. Peter, Minnesota where he attended common school and later attended high school. A well educated young man, Fritsche later became a grade school teacher for both Nicollet County and Brown County. Fritsche later studied medicine at the University of Michigan from September 24, 1884 until June 30, 1887. Fritsche later studied at the Friedrich Wilhelm University of Berlin (later the Humboldt University of Berlin) in 1890.

== Career ==
=== Medical career ===
Fritsche started practicing medicine beginning in 1887 in New Ulm and continued the practice for much of his life. Fritsche was a member of the 1890 Tenth International Medical Congress in Berlin, he was also a member of the Brown County Medical Society, the Southern Minnesota Medical Association, the State Medical Association and the American Medical Association. Fritsche served as the health officer of New Ulm from 1891-1894. In 1900 Fritsche was appointed by Minnesota Governor John Lind as a member of the Minnesota state board of medical examiners for a term of three years. Fritsche was elected as the county coroner and served until 1905, he served in the same office again from 1909 to 1911.

=== Military career ===
Beginning in 1907 Fritsche was commissioned by Minnesota Governor John Albert Johnson with the rank of Major in order to serve on the general staff of Minnesota Brigadier General Joseph Bobleter as a brigade surgeon. This military appointment would continue under Minnesota Governor Adolph Olson Eberhart following Bobleter's death in 1909. Fritsche continued his service on the staffs of General Reeves and again by his successor, Gen. A. W. Wright.

== Opposition to the First World War ==
Although a member of the United States Army, Fritsche was an ardent opposer to World War I, primarily due to his family's German-American ancestry, as well as his own extended family living in the German Empire. Fritsche and New Ulm city attorney Albert Pfaender were in Washington, D.C. attending an anti-war conference when America entered the war on April 6, 1917. Shortly after America's entry into the war the Selective Service Act of 1917 was approved and Minnesotans were soon being drafted to fight in the war. Fritsche, as well as Pfaender, and Martin Luther College professor and college president Adolph Ackerman all openly opposed the draft and America's entry into the war.

On July 25, 1917 a draft rally was held in New Ulm, Minnesota. At the rally several speeches were made by Fritsche, Pfaender, and others which stressed obedience to the new draft law, but heavily questioned and scrutinized the legality and ethics behind such a law. Fritsche soon became a target of the Minnesota Commission of Public Safety (MCPS), a political watchdog organization in Minnesota created on April 16, 1917 by the Minnesota Legislature in order to enforce draft laws, spy on citizens, and stamp out political opposition such as the Nonpartisan League and the Industrial Workers of the World who both opposed the war.

According to MNopedia historian Paul Nelson, the MCPS charged Fritsche and Pfaender with “promoting and participating in seditious public meetings.” Governor of Minnesota Joseph A. A. Burnquist later suspended Fritsche and Pfaender from holding elected office on August 21, 1917. The MCPS was eventually dissolved in 1919 and Fritsche continued to serve as mayor of New Ulm until 1920.

== Politics ==
Beginning in 1923 Fritsche ran for political office for the Minnesota Senate, representing the Minnesota Farmer–Labor Party. Fritsche ultimately lost the 1923 special election cycle in Minnesota to Magnus Johnson, who won the Farmer-Labor ticket. Fritsche would go on to run two unsuccessful campaigns for the office of Governor of Minnesota in both the 1924 Minnesota gubernatorial election and the 1928 Minnesota gubernatorial election, losing both times. Lastly, in 1930 Fritsche attempted to campaign for the office of United States House of Representatives from the Second Congressional District of Minnesota, however, he lost to Frank Clague.

== Personal life ==
Fritsche married Amalie Pfaender (1865-1960), the daughter of Minnesota politician and Dakota War of 1862 veteran William Pfaender on June 14, 1890 in Berlin. Fritsche had a total of seven children, one of which, Dr. Theodore "Ted" Roosevelt Fritsche (1906-2003), also served as the Mayor of New Ulm.
