= Theodore Christianson (judge) =

American judge

Associate Justice of the Minnesota Supreme Court
- In office 1950–1955
- Appointed by: Luther Youngdahl

Personal details
- Born: June 4, 1913; Dawson, Minnesota, U.S.
- Died: September 19, 1955 (aged 42); Saint Paul, Minnesota, U.S.
- Relations: Theodore Christianson (father)
- Education: University of Minnesota (BA, LLB)

Military service
- Branch/service: United States Navy
- Battles/wars: World War II

Theodore Christianson (June 4, 1913 – September 19, 1955) was an American jurist.

== Early life and education ==
Born in Dawson, Minnesota, Christianson graduated from University High School in 1931. He then received his bachelor's degree from University of Minnesota in 1935 and his law degree from University of Minnesota Law School in 1937.

== Career ==
After graduating from law school, Christianson practiced law in Saint Paul, Minnesota. During World War II, Christianson served in the United States Navy. Christianson served on the Minnesota Supreme Court from 1950 until his death in 1955.

== Personal life ==
Christianson's father was Governor Theodore Christianson. He died suddenly of a heart attack at his home in Saint Paul, Minnesota.
