= Earl Renneke =

American politician (1928–2021)

Member of the Minnesota Senate from the 15th, 23rd and 35th district
- In office 1969–1993

Personal details
- Born: Earl W. Renneke; March 10, 1928 St. Peter, Minnesota
- Died: March 3, 2021 (aged 92) Le Sueur, Minnesota
- Party: Republican Party of Minnesota
- Spouse: Marjorie Eckberg
- Children: 3
- Education: University of Minnesota
- Occupation: Farmer, politician

Earl W. Renneke (March 10, 1928 – March 3, 2021) was an American politician who served in the Minnesota Senate from southern Minnesota.

== Life and career ==
He was first elected in a March 25, 1969, special election to fill the vacancy that arose due to the unexpected death of Senator Harold Popp in a traffic accident on February 21, 1969. He was re-elected in 1970, 1972, 1976, 1980, 1982, 1986 and 1990. He represented the old districts 15 and 23 and, later, District 35, which included all or portions of Blue Earth, Carver, LeSueur, McLeod, Nicollet, Scott and Sibley counties, changing somewhat through redistricting in 1970 and 1980.

From the town of Le Sueur, Renneke, a farmer, earned a reputation as a strong advocate for agriculture and preservation of natural resources. His special legislative concerns included these issues, as well as corrections and education. He was a member of the Senate Agriculture & Natural Resources, Commerce, Corrections & Commitments, Elections & Reapportionment, Finance, Governmental Operations, Health & Welfare, Labor Relations, Local & Urban Government, Public Employees & Pensions, Rules & Administration, and Veterans & General Legislation committees, and of various other committee incarnations and subcommittees during his 24 years in office. He originally allied with the Conservative Caucus at a time when the legislature was still officially nonpartisan, and later identified as a Republican when party affiliation became required of candidates.

Renneke did not seek re-election in 1992. After leaving the legislature, he spearheaded an effort on behalf of the Sibley County Historical Society to obtain funding from the state for restoration of the 1879 county courthouse and development of the Joseph R. Brown Interpretive Center. Brown was an early state pioneer, entrepreneur and politician, and the founder of the town of Henderson.

In 1999, Governor Jesse Ventura appointed Renneke to serve on the Minnesota Compensation Council, which determines the salaries of the state’s elected and appointed officials. In 2005, he was appointed by the Legislative Commission on Minnesota Resources to serve on the Environment & Natural Resources Trust Fund Advisory Task Force. He served as chairman of the campaign committee for Senator Dennis Frederickson of New Ulm.
