= 1924 Minnesota gubernatorial election =

- November 4, 1924
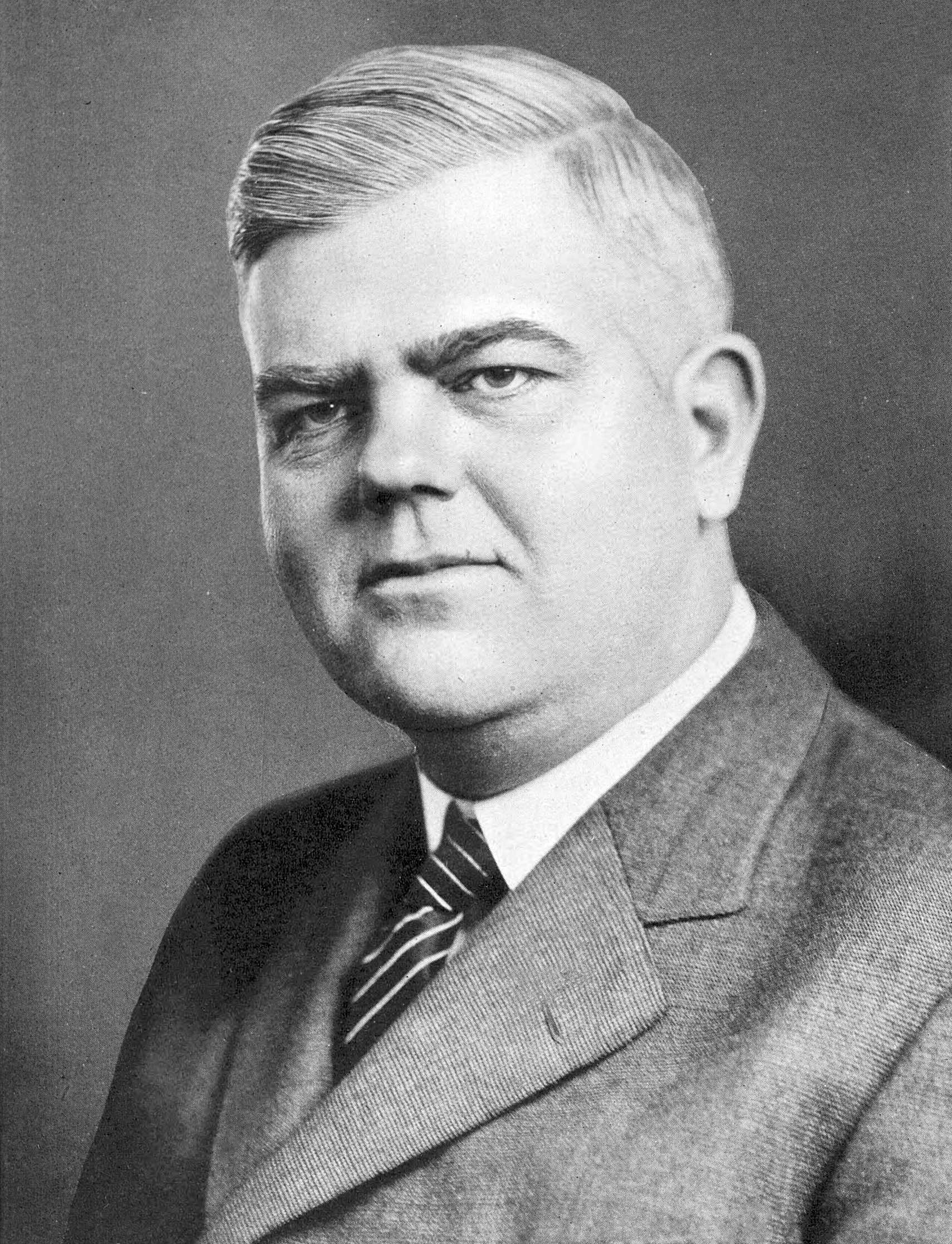

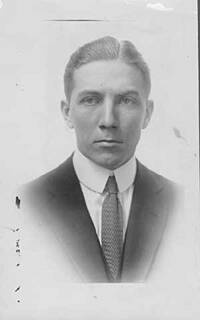

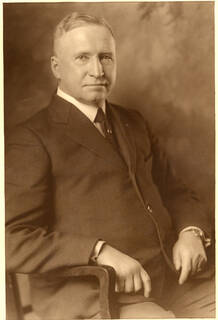
Nominee	Theodore Christianson	Floyd B. Olson	Carlos Avery
Party	Republican	Farmer–Labor	Democratic
Popular vote	406,692	366,029	49,353
Percentage	48.71%	43.84%	5.91%
- County results Christianson: 40–50% 50–60% 60–70% Olson: 40–50% 50–60% 60–70%
Governor before election
J. A. O. Preus
Republican
Elected Governor
Theodore Christianson
Republican

The 1924 Minnesota gubernatorial election took place on November 4, 1924. Republican Party of Minnesota candidate Theodore Christianson defeated Farmer–Labor Party challenger Floyd B. Olson.

== Republican primary ==
Incumbent Republican J.A.O. Preus did not run for a third term, and had no chosen successor.

=== Candidates ===
==== Nominated ====
- Theodore Christianson, state representative

=== Eliminated in primary ===
- Franklin Ellsworth, former member of the United States House of Representatives
- Ole P.B. (O.P.B.) Jacobson, Minnesota railroad and warehouse commissioner
- Curtis M. Johnson, president of the State Agricultural Society
- George E. Leach, mayor of Minneapolis
- Julius A. Schmahl, former Minnesota secretary of state
- Thomas Vollum

== Farmer-Labor primary ==
The Farmer-Labor Party was divided between the Progressive faction and the Communist faction, colloquially referred to as the "Red" faction. The nomination's winner, Floyd B. Olson, was a member of the Progressive faction.

=== Candidates ===
==== Nominated ====
- Floyd B. Olson, county attorney of Hennepin County

=== Eliminated in primary ===
- Tom E. Davis, former mayor of Marshall
- Louis A. Fritsche, mayor of New Ulm
- Victor Lawson, mayor of Willmar
- William Royster, locomotive engineer
- William Schaper, former political science professor at the University of Minnesota

== Democratic primary ==
Lambrecht withdrew from the race on May 14, 1924, to save the state the money that would be needed for a primary election. Avery became the unanimous nominee by default.

=== Candidates ===
==== Nominated ====
- Carlos Avery, former mayor of Hutchinson

==== Withdrawn ====
- Michael Lambrecht, pacifist and wallpaper hanger

== Candidates ==
- Oscar R. Anderson (Industrial)
- Carlos Avery, former mayor of Hutchinson (Democratic)
- Theodore Christianson, state representative (Republican)
- Michael Ferch, bank president (Prohibition)
- Floyd B. Olson, county attorney of Hennepin County (Farmer-Labor)

== Campaigns ==
Christianson officially opened his campaign on September 20. He received endorsements from incumbent governor J.A.O. Preus and Representative Thomas D. Schall. Christianson's campaign was focused on "No compromise with Socialism in any of its disguises." He believed that the Farmer-Labor policies of state-owned railroads and utilities would bring the country into debt. Instead, he proposed that the state's finances should be redirected to funding education. Christianson was the first gubernatorial candidate to campaign towards women, speaking at local women's Republican gatherings.

Olson and the Farmer-Labor party as a whole were branded as "socialist and radical" by Republican journalists.

Olson attacked Christianson on his tax and financial policy. Christianson campaigned on the slogan of "More Ted, less taxes". Olson argued that as a member of the legislature, Christianson was partially responsible for the taxes he was now campaigning against, and had proposed no actual plan to financially restructure the state other than lowering taxes. Olson focused on internal changes to be made to the state, such as advocating for the elimination of the position of surveyor general of logs and state timber agent, as the duties of both were already supposed to be carried out by the attorney general.

Democratic nominee Carlos Avery dismissed the Farmer-Labor party as a party of "misguided fledglings." He positioned himself as a reformer, hoping to be an alternative for progressive voters put off by the socialist factions of the Farmer-Labor party. Avery campaigned on an extensive policy of limited government and internal reform, a strong environmentalist policy (including supporting a state constitutional amendment mandating that forests could not be cleared for farmland) a massive irrigation effort for agriculture, new funding for highways and public transportation, and the expansion of welfare.

== Results ==
1924 gubernatorial election, Minnesota
Party	Candidate	Votes	%	±%
Republican	Theodore Christianson	406,692	48.71%	+3.49%
Farmer–Labor	Floyd B. Olson	366,029	43.84%	+0.71%
Democratic	Carlos Avery	49,353	5.91%	−5.75%
Prohibition	Michael Ferch	9,052	1.08%	n/a
Industrial	Oscar Anderson	3,876	0.46%	n/a
Majority		40,663	4.87%	
Turnout		835,002		
Republican hold		Swing		

== See also ==
- List of Minnesota gubernatorial elections
