= 1936 United States Senate special election in Minnesota =

- November 3, 1936
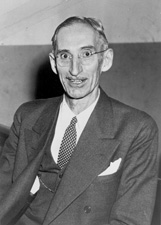

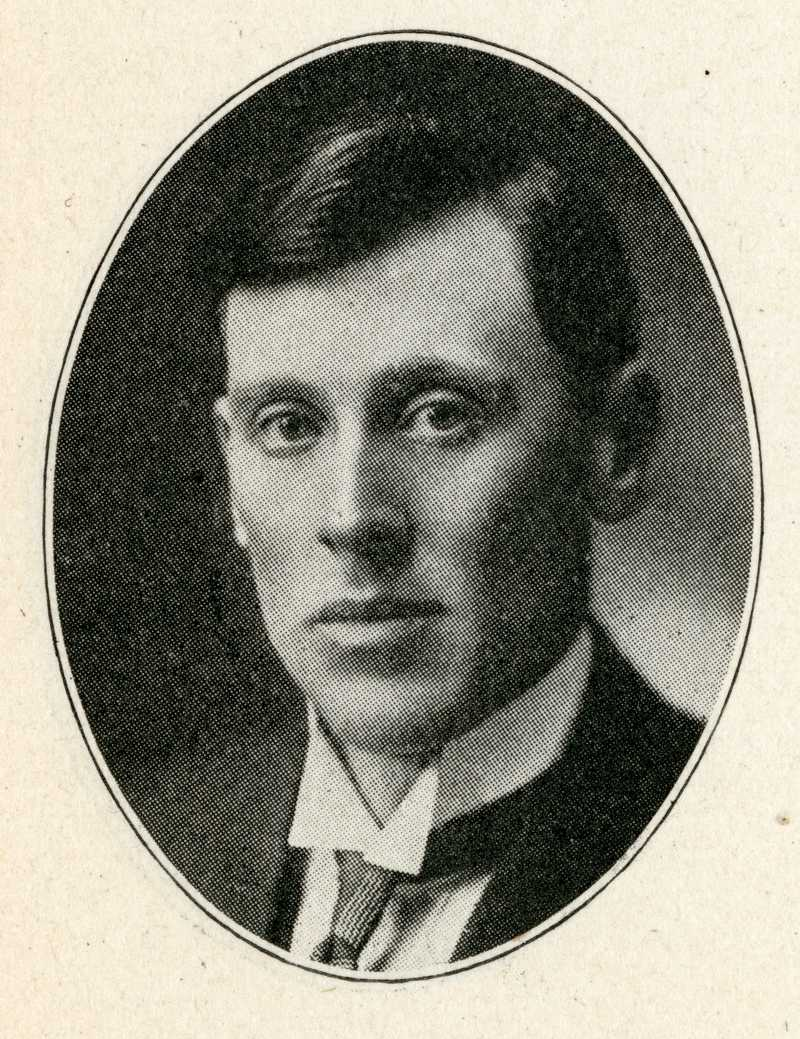

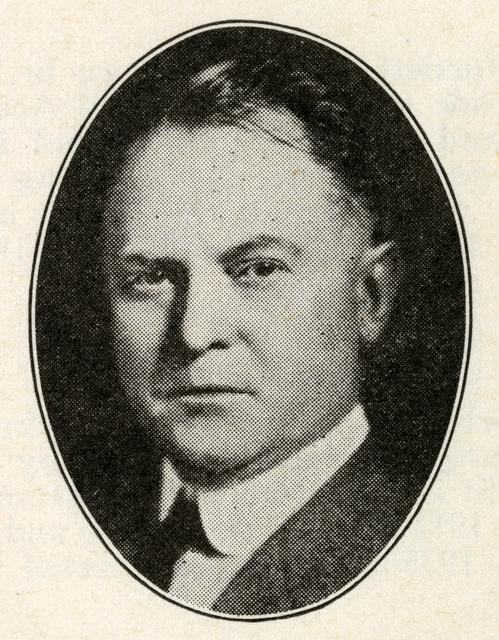

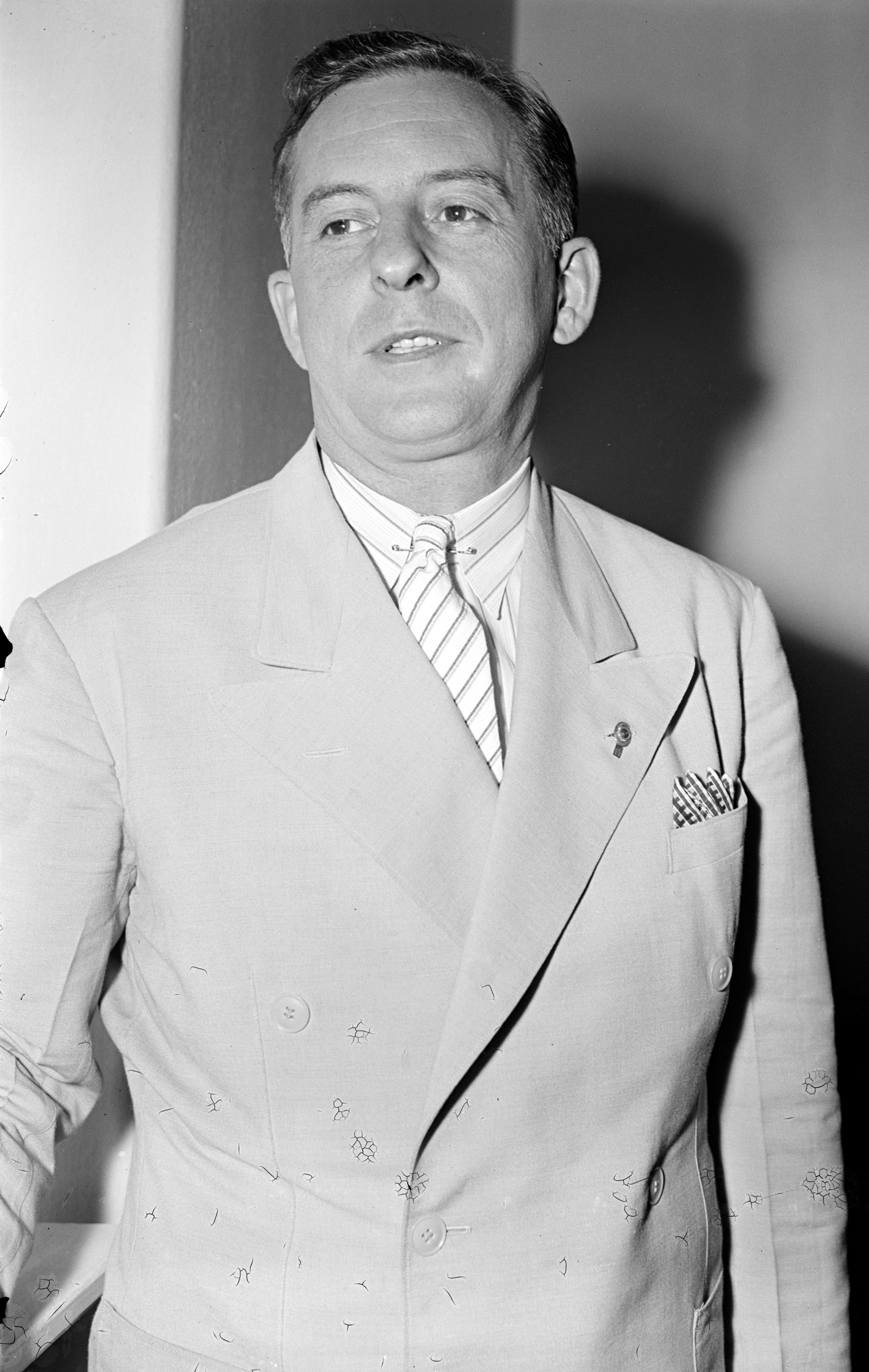
| Nominee | Guy V. Howard | N. J. Holmberg |
| Party | Republican | Independent |
| Popular vote | 317,457 | 210,364 |
| Percentage | 42.89% | 28.42% |
| Nominee | Andrew Olaf Devold | John G. Alexander |
| Party | Independent | Independent |
| Popular vote | 147,858 | 64,493 |
| Percentage | 19.98% | 8.71% |
- County results Howard: 30–40% 40–50% 50–60% 60–70% Holmberg: 30–40% Devold: 30–40% Tie: Howard/Holmberg 30–40%
U.S. senator before election
Elmer A. Benson
Farmer–Labor
Elected U.S. Senator
Guy V. Howard
Republican

The 1936 United States Senate special election in Minnesota took place on November 3, 1936. The election was held to fill the vacancy in the seat formerly held by Thomas D. Schall for the final two months of Schall's unexpired term. Governor Floyd B. Olson had appointed Elmer Benson to fill the seat in 1935, but this appointment was temporary and subject to a special election held in the next general election year thereafter—1936. Benson opted to run for governor instead of running for election to continue for the remainder of the term. No special primaries were held for the special election. Among Minnesota's three major parties, only the Republican Party of Minnesota officially fielded a candidate—Guy V. Howard. Regardless of the absence of Farmer-Labor and Democratic nominees, Howard nevertheless faced a great degree of competition from independent candidates Nathaniel J. Holmberg, Andrew Olaf Devold, and John G. Alexander.

== Candidates ==
- John G. Alexander (I), Attorney and real estate manager
- Andrew Olaf Devold (I), Attorney, State Senator since 1919, former State Representative (1915–1919); a member of the Farmer-Labor Party of Minnesota and formerly a member of the Socialist Party of Minnesota
- N. J. Holmberg (I), Former State Senator (1915–1919) and State Representative (1907–1915); a member of the Republican Party of Minnesota
- Guy V. Howard (R), Businessman and Republican elector in the 1916 presidential election

== Special election ==
=== Results ===
Special election results
| Party | Candidate | Votes | % |
|---|---|---|---|
| Republican | Guy V. Howard | 317,457 | 42.89% |
| Independent | N. J. Holmberg | 210,364 | 28.42% |
| Independent | Andrew Olaf Devold | 147,858 | 19.98% |
| Independent | John G. Alexander | 64,493 | 8.71% |
| Total votes | | 740,172 | 100.00% |
| Majority | | 107,093 | 14.47% |
| Republican gain from Farmer–Labor | | | |

== See also ==
- United States Senate elections, 1936 and 1937
