= Harold Popp =

American pharmacist, businessman, and politician

Harold R. Popp
- Born: June 17, 1903; Hutchinson, Minnesota, U.S.
- Died: February 22, 1969 (aged 64); St. Louis Park, Minnesota, U.S.
- Education: University of Wisconsin–Madison
- Occupations: Pharmacist, Businessman, Politician
- Known for: Service in the Minnesota Senate, Mayoralty of Hutchinson

Harold R. Popp (June 17, 1903 – February 22, 1969) was an American pharmacist, businessman, and politician.

Popp was born in Hutchinson, Minnesota. He graduated from Hutchinson. He received his bachelor's degree in pharmacy from University of Wisconsin–Madison. Popp was the owner of Popp Rexall Drug Store in Hutchinson. Popp served on the Hutchinson School Board from 1949 to 1953 and as mayor of Hutchinson from 1953 to 1958. Popp served in the Minnesota Senate from 1959 until death in 1969. He was an Independent. Popp and his wife were killed in an automobile accident when their automobile skidded on some ice on Highway 7 east of Highway 261 in McLeod County, Minnesota. Popp died at Methodist Hospital in St. Louis Park, Minnesota.
