= Theodore Christianson =

American politician

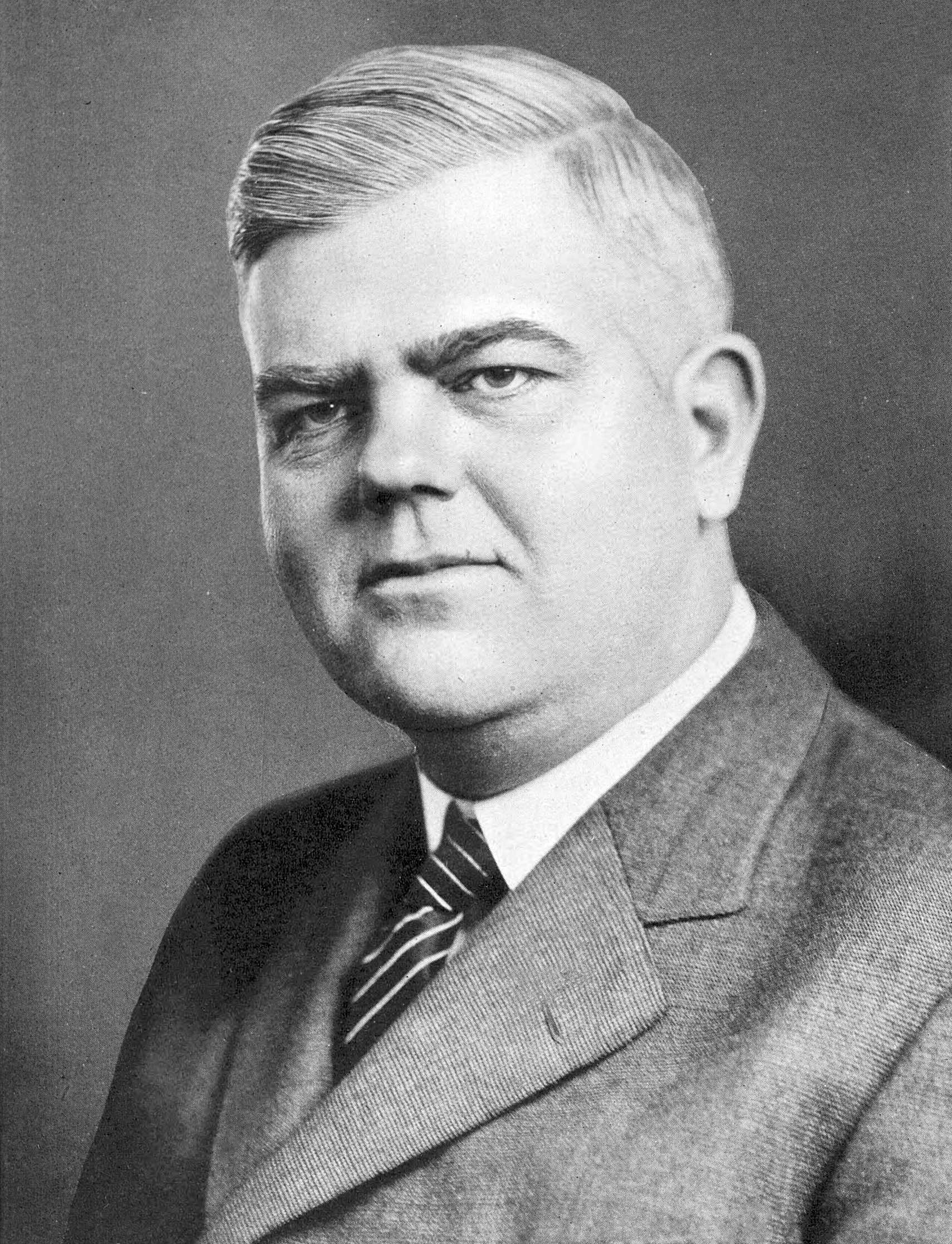
- Christianson c. 1925

21st Governor of Minnesota
- In office January 6, 1925 – January 6, 1931
- Lieutenant: William I. Nolan; Charles E. Adams
- Preceded by: J. A. O. Preus
- Succeeded by: Floyd B. Olson

Member of the U.S. House of Representatives from Minnesota
- In office March 4, 1933 – January 3, 1937
- Preceded by: General ticket adopted
- Succeeded by: Dewey Johnson
- Constituency: At-large district (1933–1935); 5th district (1935–1937)

Personal details
- Born: September 12, 1883 Lac qui Parle Township, Minnesota, U.S.
- Died: December 10, 1948 (aged 65) Dawson, Minnesota, U.S.
- Party: Republican
- Relations: Theodore Christianson (son)
- Education: University of Minnesota (BA, LLB)

Theodore Christianson (September 12, 1883 – December 9, 1948) was an American politician who served as the 21st governor of Minnesota from January 6, 1925, until January 6, 1931.

== Early life and education ==
Christianson was born in Lac qui Parle Township, Minnesota. He was of Norwegian descent. He attended Dawson High School. Christianson graduated from the University of Minnesota in 1906 and the University of Minnesota Law School in 1909. He was admitted to the Minnesota State Bar in 1909.

== Career ==
Before entering politics, Christianson had pursued dual careers in western Minnesota, where he practiced law and was editor and publisher of the Dawson Sentinel for fifteen years. During his time with the Dawson Sentinel, Christianson published anti-German and anti-Bolshevik editorials, particularly targeting Albert Pfaender, son of William Pfaender, of New Ulm. He served as a member of the Minnesota House of Representatives for five terms.

"More Ted, Less Taxes" was the Christians's campaign slogan when he ran for governor in 1924. During his administration, he limited taxes and cut expenditures at every level of state government. While running for his first term in 1924, Christianson received endorsements from incumbent governor J.A.O. Preus and Representative Thomas D. Schall. Christianson's campaign was focused on "No compromise with Socialism in any of its disguises." Christianson believed that the Farmer-Labor Party policies of state-owned railroads and utilities would bring the country into debt. Instead, Christianson proposed that the state's finances should be redirected to funding education. Christianson would be the first gubernatorial candidate to campaign towards women, speaking at local women Republican gatherings.

During his tenure as governor, Christianson established a three-member Commission of Administration and Finance. This so-called "Big Three" unleashed the veto power of the chief executive, who slashed budget appropriations he considered extravagant.

In 1925, the Minnesota Senate and House of Representatives passed a bill for eugenics-based sterilization. Governor Christianson signed the bill into law, and on January 8, 1926, six women living in a mental asylum in Fairbault were sterilized.

Christianson held mail correspondence and met with H. E. Kettering, Minnesota Grand Dragon of the Ku Klux Klan. In 1926, W. A. Kanorr sent a letter to Christianson describing members of the Ku Klux Klan working postmaster positions across Minnesota and the broader United States to keep track of citizens' activities through their mail.

In 1928, Christianson was the first gubernatorial candidate to begin campaigning over the radio for the general election.

Christianson was a candidate for the 1930 United States Senate election in Minnesota, placing second in the Republican primary after incumbent Senator Thomas Schall. During a three-year hiatus from politics, Christianson wrote five-volume history text called The Land of Sky-Tinted Waters: A History of the State and its People. He was elected to the United States House of Representatives in 1932 and served until 1937. In 1936, he did not run for re-election to the House, opting to launch another bid for the Senate in the 1936 election. Receiving the Republican nomination, he ran against former congressman Ernest Lundeen of the Farmer Labor Party and was defeated, receiving 37% of the vote.

After leaving politics, Christianson moved to Chicago and served as secretary-manager of the National Association of Retail Grocers from 1937 to 1939. He was public relations counsel for the National Association of Retail Druggists from 1938 to 1945, and editor of The Journal of the National Association of Retail Druggists: Official Organ of the N.A.R.D. from 1945 to 1948.

== Personal life ==
His son was Theodore Christianson who served on the Minnesota Supreme Court.

Christianson retired to Dawson, Minnesota, when he died of a heart attack at 65. He is interred at Sunset Memorial Park Cemetery in Minneapolis, Minnesota.

In 1989, Christianson was honored as the first gnome in Dawson, Minnesota. Annually, one person is chosen who has served the community to be depicted as a gnome. The gnome of "Governor Ted" can be found in the Dawson Public Library and is made of wood.

== Other sources ==
- Biographical information
- Gubernatorial records
- Minnesota Historical Society
- Minnesota Legislators Past and Present

Party political offices
Preceded by J. A. O. Preus	Republican nominee for Governor of Minnesota; 1924, 1926, 1928	Succeeded by Ray P. Chase
Preceded by Guy V. Howard	Republican nominee for U.S. Senator from Minnesota (Class 2); 1936	Succeeded by Arthur E. Nelson
Political offices
Preceded by J. A. O. Preus	Governor of Minnesota; 1925–1931	Succeeded by Floyd B. Olson
U.S. House of Representatives
Preceded by General Ticket Adopted	U.S. Representative from Minnesota; General Ticket Seat Three; 1933–1935	Succeeded by General Ticket Abolished
Preceded by General Ticket Abolished	U.S. Representative from Minnesota's 5th congressional district 1935–1937	Succeeded by Dewey Johnson
