= Guy V. Howard =

American politician (1879–1954)

Guy Victor Howard
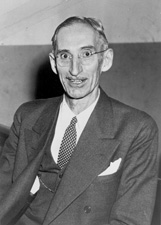

United States Senator from Minnesota
- In office November 4, 1936 – January 3, 1937
- Preceded by: Elmer Austin Benson
- Succeeded by: Ernest Lundeen

Personal details
- Born: November 28, 1879 Minneapolis, Minnesota, U.S.
- Died: August 20, 1954 (aged 74) Minneapolis, Minnesota, U.S.
- Party: Republican
- Education: Minnesota School of Business; Georgetown University

Guy Victor Howard (November 28, 1879 – August 20, 1954) was an American politician.

== Early life ==
Guy Victor Howard was born in Minneapolis, Minnesota in 1879. He attended public schools, Minneapolis School of Business, and Georgetown University in Washington, D.C. Howard served as a clerk in the post office in the United States House of Representatives from 1897 to 1901. He worked in the insurance business in Minneapolis in 1901, and was a presidential elector on the Republican ticket in 1916.

== United States Senate ==
Howard was elected on November 3, 1936, to the United States Senate from Minnesota as a Republican. He was elected to fill the vacancy caused by the death of Thomas D. Schall and served from November 4, 1936, to January 3, 1937, in the 74th congress. He did not seek election for the full term beginning in 1937.

== Later life ==
After the Senate, Howard returned to the insurance business and died in Minneapolis on August 20, 1954. He was interred in Lakewood Cemetery.

Party political offices
Preceded by Thomas D. Schall	Republican nominee for U.S. Senator from Minnesota (Class 2); 1936	Succeeded by Theodore Christianson
U.S. Senate
Preceded by Elmer Austin Benson	U.S. senator (Class 2) from Minnesota; 1936–1937; Served alongside: Henrik Shipstead	Succeeded by Ernest Lundeen
