= Dawson Sentinel =

Newspaper in Dawson, Minnesota

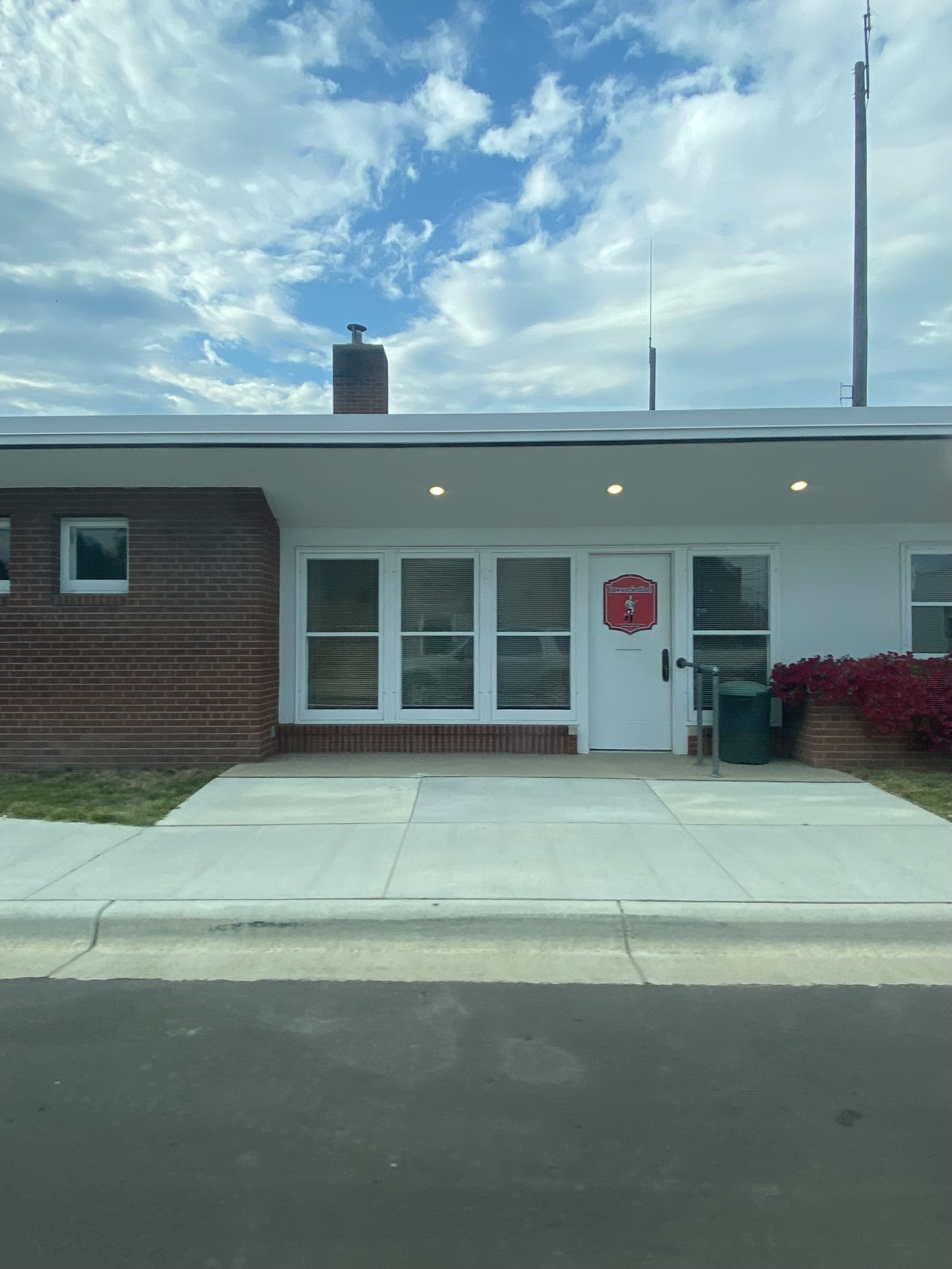
- Dawson Sentinel Building
- Type: Weekly newspaper
- Publisher: Dave Hickey
- Editor: Dave Hickey
- Founded: 1884 (as Dawson Eagle)
- Language: English
- Headquarters: 674 Chestnut Street, Dawson, MN 56232
- City: Dawson, Minnesota
- Country: USA
- Circulation: 1,550
- OCLC number: 20389360

The Dawson Sentinel is an English-language newspaper operating in Dawson, Minnesota. It was founded in December 1884 and is published weekly on Wednesdays.

== History ==
The Dawson Sentinel published its first issue on December 5, 1884, under the name the Dawson Eagle. In 1886, the Dawson Eagle changed its name to The Sentinel. The name of the newspaper was finally changed to the Dawson Sentinel in 1898.

The first editor of the Dawson Sentinel was C. J. Coghlan. Theodore Christianson, former Governor of Minnesota was the owner, editor, and publisher of the Dawson Sentinel from 1909 to 1925. During this time, Christianson wrote and published anti-German and anti-Bolshevik editorials. The newspaper was co-owned by William Nicholas Kremer until his death in 2020.

The Dawson Sentinel is available on microfilm at the Gale Family Library at the Minnesota History Center.

== See also ==
- List of newspapers in Minnesota
