= Carlos Avery Game Farm =

- U.S. National Register of Historic Places
- U.S. Historic district
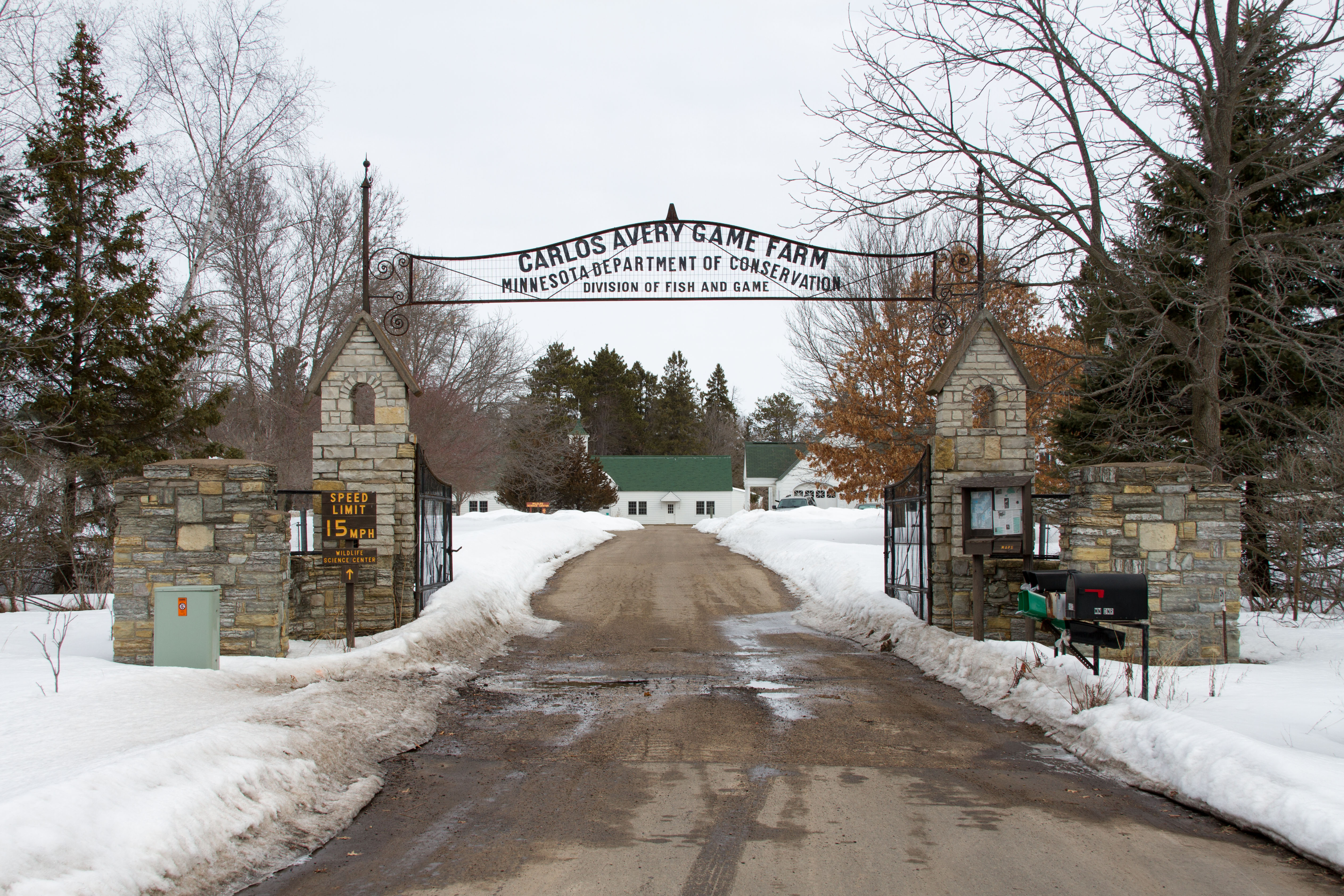

- Location within Minnesota Location within the United States
- Location: Linwood Township, Anoka County, Minnesota
- Nearest city: Columbus, Minnesota
- Coordinates: 45°17′18″N 93°7′46″W
- Area: 16 acres (6.5 ha)
- Built: 1936
- Built by: Works Progress Administration
- Architect: Walter D MacLeith
- Architectural style: Colonial Revival
- MPS: Federal Relief Construction in Minnesota MPS
- NRHP reference No.: 91000977
- Added to NRHP: August 9, 1991

Carlos Avery Game Farm is a complex of 11 buildings at the Carlos Avery Wildlife Management Area in Minnesota, United States, which is listed on the National Register of Historic Places (NRHP). The buildings are the administrative center for the wildlife management area, which extends across a large part of Anoka and Chisago counties, as well as for a number of other Minnesota Department of Natural Resources properties in the area. The nomination for the NRHP noted that when it opened in 1937, it was one of the largest and best-equipped game farms in the nation, as well as one of the first large-scale wildlife management efforts in Minnesota.

== History ==
The refuge was named after Carlos Avery (1868–1930), executive agent of the Minnesota Game and Fish Commission from 1907 to 1909 and 1915 to 1923. It was established with 8,000 acres (3,200 ha) obtained from the Crex Carpet Company. The carpet company had harvested a wire grass from the land for use in the manufacture of rugs. The land was tax forfeited in 1933 and then purchased by the Minnesota Conservation Commission. Carlos Avery game farms were formally opened and dedicated to the former game warden in 1938.

The land was ideal for production of bobwhite quail, which had been plentiful in Minnesota but was on the decline. In 1935, the United States government asked states to submit projects for relief of unemployment. The game refuge was approved by the Works Progress Administration and established by President Franklin Delano Roosevelt. The refuge was outfitted with five buildings, including a central heating plant and pumphouse, two houses, a combination barn/henhouse, and an incubation room. Other functional areas in the refuge included a sanctuary for wild birds and animals, a nursery, and room for public hunting.

Production of bobwhite quail began with 200 pairs of birds raised in a game farm in Mound, Minnesota. The first breeding resulted in 1879 birds, with 1000 of them retained for future breeding and the release of the rest. The bobwhite quail project continued until 1955. The refuge also hosted breeding for chukar partridge from 1939 through 1947, ring-necked pheasants from 1947 through 1981, and the reintroduction of the Canada goose from 1950 through 1970. In 1981, though, the management philosophy changed. The Minnesota Department of Natural Resources discontinued large-scale breeding programs and changed its focus to improving habitat and providing nesting cover and food. As of 2009, the wildlife management area contains a 4,500-acre (1,800 ha) sanctuary that is closed to all hunting and trespassing. Outside the sanctuary, the primary recreational opportunities include hunting for waterfowl, deer, and squirrels. It also provides trapping for mink, muskrats, raccoons, and beavers. More than 272 species of birds are attracted to the refuge, providing popular opportunities for bird watching.

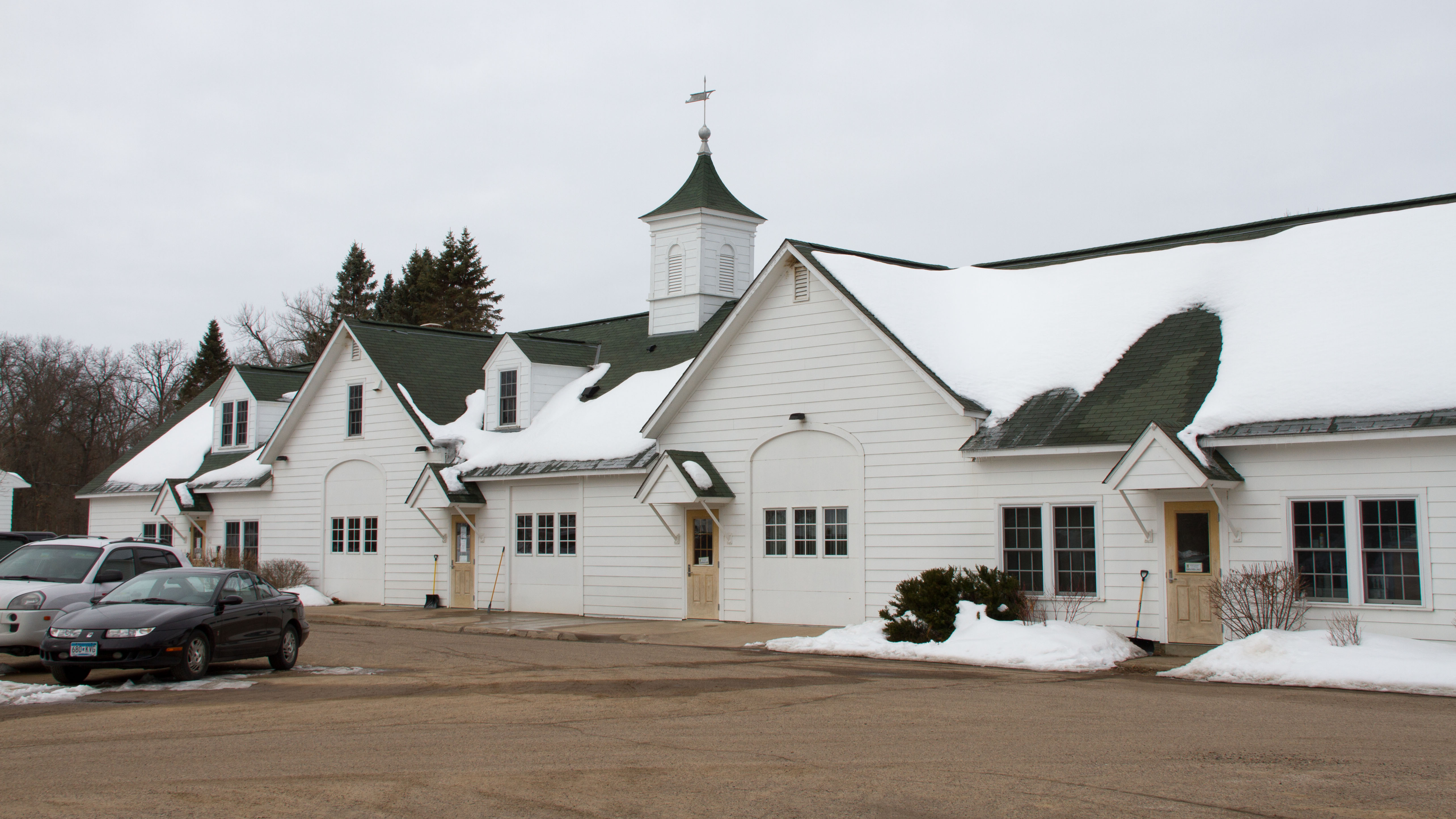
The Colonial Revival buildings were built between 1936 and 1941.
