= List of United States representatives in the 68th Congress =

This is a complete list of United States representatives during the 68th United States Congress listed by seniority.

As an historical article, the districts and party affiliations listed reflect those during the 68th Congress (March 4, 1923 – March 3, 1925). Seats and party affiliations on similar lists for other congresses will be different for certain members.

Seniority depends on the date on which members were sworn into office. Since many members are sworn in on the same day, subsequent ranking is based on previous congressional service of the individual and then by alphabetical order by the last name of the representative.

Committee chairmanship in the House is often associated with seniority. However, party leadership is typically not associated with seniority.

Note: The "*" indicates that the representative/delegate may have served one or more non-consecutive terms while in the House of Representatives of the United States Congress.

== U.S. House seniority list ==
U.S. House seniority
Rank	Representative	Party	District	Seniority date (Previous service, if any)	No.# of term(s)	Notes
1	Frederick H. Gillett	R	MA-02	March 4, 1893	16th term	Dean and Speaker of the House; Left the House in 1925.
2	Thomas S. Butler	R	PA-08	March 4, 1897	14th term	
3	William S. Greene	R	MA-15	May 31, 1898	14th term	Died on September 22, 1924.
4	Gilbert N. Haugen	R	IA-04	March 4, 1899	13th term	
5	Claude Kitchin	D	NC-02	March 4, 1901	12th term	Died on May 31, 1923.
6	Edward W. Pou	D	NC-04	March 4, 1901	12th term	
7	Charles Russell Davis	R	MN-03	March 4, 1903	11th term	Left the House in 1925.
8	John Nance Garner	D	TX-15	March 4, 1903	11th term	
9	Benjamin G. Humphreys II	D	MS-03	March 4, 1903	11th term	Died on October 16, 1923.
10	Thomas Montgomery Bell	D	GA-09	March 4, 1905	10th term	
11	Frank Clark	D	FL-02	March 4, 1905	10th term	Left the House in 1925.
12	Finis J. Garrett	D	TN-09	March 4, 1905	10th term	
13	Gordon Lee	D	GA-07	March 4, 1905	10th term	
14	Julius Kahn	R	CA-04	March 4, 1905; Previous service, 1899–1903.	12th term*	Died on December 18, 1924.
15	Martin B. Madden	R	IL-01	March 4, 1905	10th term	
16	Daniel J. Riordan	D	NY-11	November 6, 1906; Previous service, 1899–1901.	11th term*	Died on April 28, 1923.
17	Willis C. Hawley	R	OR-01	March 4, 1907	9th term	
18	Ben Johnson	D	KY-04	March 4, 1907	9th term	
19	John W. Langley	R	KY-10	March 4, 1907	9th term	
20	James C. McLaughlin	R	MI-09	March 4, 1907	9th term	
21	Adolph J. Sabath	D	IL-05	March 4, 1907	9th term	
22	Daniel Read Anthony, Jr.	R	KS-01	May 23, 1907	9th term	
23	Charles D. Carter	D	OK-03	November 16, 1907	9th term	
24	Joseph W. Byrns, Sr.	D	TN-06	March 4, 1909	8th term	
25	J. Campbell Cantrill	D	KY-07	March 4, 1909	8th term	Died on September 2, 1923.
26	James W. Collier	D	MS-08	March 4, 1909	8th term	
27	William Walton Griest	R	PA-10	March 4, 1909	8th term	
28	William Allan Oldfield	D	AR-02	March 4, 1909	8th term	
29	Edward T. Taylor	D	CO-04	March 4, 1909	8th term	
30	Robert Y. Thomas, Jr.	D	KY-03	March 4, 1909	8th term	
31	H. Garland Dupré	D	LA-02	November 8, 1910	8th term	Died on February 21, 1924.
32	Sydney Anderson	R	MN-01	March 4, 1911	7th term	Left the House in 1925.
33	James F. Byrnes	D	SC-02	March 4, 1911	7th term	Left the House in 1925.
34	Robert L. Doughton	D	NC-08	March 4, 1911	7th term	
35	William J. Fields	D	KY-09	March 4, 1911	7th term	Resigned on December 11, 1923.
36	John Charles Linthicum	D	MD-04	March 4, 1911	7th term	
37	John C. McKenzie	R	IL-13	March 4, 1911	7th term	Left the House in 1925.
38	Luther W. Mott	R	NY-32	March 4, 1911	7th term	Died on July 10, 1923.
39	Stephen G. Porter	R	PA-32	March 4, 1911	7th term	
40	John E. Raker	D	CA-02	March 4, 1911	7th term	
41	Arthur B. Rouse	D	KY-06	March 4, 1911	7th term	
42	Charles M. Stedman	D	NC-05	March 4, 1911	7th term	
43	Horace Mann Towner	R	IA-08	March 4, 1911	7th term	Resigned on April 1, 1923.
44	William R. Green	R	IA-09	June 5, 1911	7th term	
45	Carl Hayden	D	AZ	February 19, 1912	7th term	
46	William Scott Vare	R	PA-01	May 24, 1912	7th term	
47	James Benjamin Aswell	D	LA-08	March 4, 1913	6th term	
48	Alben W. Barkley	D	KY-01	March 4, 1913	6th term	
49	Frederick A. Britten	R	IL-09	March 4, 1913	6th term	
50	Edward E. Browne	R	WI-08	March 4, 1913	6th term	
51	John F. Carew	D	NY-18	March 4, 1913	6th term	
52	Louis C. Cramton	R	MI-07	March 4, 1913	6th term	
53	Charles R. Crisp	D	GA-03	March 4, 1913; Previous service, 1896–1897.	7th term*	
54	Charles F. Curry	R	CA-03	March 4, 1913	6th term	
55	George W. Edmonds	R	PA-04	March 4, 1913	6th term	Left the House in 1925.
56	James A. Frear	R	WI-10	March 4, 1913	6th term	
57	George Scott Graham	R	PA-02	March 4, 1913	6th term	
58	Albert Johnson	R	WA-03	March 4, 1913	6th term	
59	Edgar Raymond Kiess	R	PA-16	March 4, 1913	6th term	
60	Ladislas Lazaro	D	LA-07	March 4, 1913	6th term	
61	Carl E. Mapes	R	MI-05	March 4, 1913	6th term	
62	Andrew Jackson Montague	D	VA-03	March 4, 1913	6th term	
63	John M. Morin	R	PA-34	March 4, 1913	6th term	
64	James S. Parker	R	NY-29	March 4, 1913	6th term	
65	Sam Rayburn	D	TX-04	March 4, 1913	6th term	
66	John Jacob Rogers	R	MA-05	March 4, 1913	6th term	
67	Percy Quin	D	MS-07	March 4, 1913	6th term	
68	Nicholas J. Sinnott	R	OR-02	March 4, 1913	6th term	
69	Addison T. Smith	R	ID-02	March 4, 1913	6th term	
70	Hatton W. Sumners	D	TX-05	March 4, 1913	6th term	
71	Allen T. Treadway	R	MA-01	March 4, 1913	6th term	
72	Otis Wingo	D	AR-04	March 4, 1913	6th term	
73	Samuel Winslow	R	MA-04	March 4, 1913	6th term	Left the House in 1925.
74	George M. Young	R	ND-02	March 4, 1913	6th term	Resigned on September 2, 1924.
75	James P. Buchanan	D	TX-10	April 15, 1913	6th term	
76	Frank Park	D	GA-02	November 4, 1913	6th term	Left the House in 1925.
77	Calvin Paige	R	MA-03	November 4, 1913	6th term	Left the House in 1925.
78	James A. Gallivan	D	MA-12	April 3, 1914	6th term	
79	Carl Vinson	D	GA-10	November 3, 1914	6th term	
80	Edward B. Almon	D	AL-08	March 4, 1915	5th term	
81	Isaac Bacharach	R	NJ-02	March 4, 1915	5th term	
82	Eugene Black	D	TX-01	March 4, 1915	5th term	
83	John G. Cooper	R	OH-19	March 4, 1915	5th term	
84	Porter H. Dale	R	VT-02	March 4, 1915	5th term	Resigned on August 11, 1923.
85	Frederick W. Dallinger	R	MA-08	March 4, 1915	5th term	Left the House in 1925.
86	George P. Darrow	R	PA-07	March 4, 1915	5th term	
87	S. Wallace Dempsey	R	NY-40	March 4, 1915	5th term	
88	Edward E. Denison	R	IL-25	March 4, 1915	5th term	
89	Cassius C. Dowell	R	IA-07	March 4, 1915	5th term	
90	Leonidas C. Dyer	R	MO-12	March 4, 1915; Previous service, 1911–1914.	7th term*	
91	Richard P. Freeman	R	CT-02	March 4, 1915	5th term	
92	Charles Eugene Fuller	R	IL-12	March 4, 1915; Previous service, 1903–1913.	10th term*	
93	Lindley H. Hadley	R	WA-02	March 4, 1915	5th term	
94	George Huddleston	D	AL-09	March 4, 1915	5th term	
95	Harry E. Hull	R	IA-02	March 4, 1915	5th term	Left the House in 1925.
96	W. Frank James	R	MI-12	March 4, 1915	5th term	
97	Royal C. Johnson	R	SD-02	March 4, 1915	5th term	
98	Charles Cyrus Kearns	R	OH-06	March 4, 1915	5th term	
99	David Hayes Kincheloe	D	KY-02	March 4, 1915	5th term	
100	Edward John King	R	IL-15	March 4, 1915	5th term	
101	Frederick R. Lehlbach	R	NJ-10	March 4, 1915	5th term	
102	Nicholas Longworth	R	OH-01	March 4, 1915; Previous service, 1903–1913.	10th term*	
103	Walter W. Magee	R	NY-35	March 4, 1915	5th term	
104	Whitmell P. Martin	D	LA-03	March 4, 1915	5th term	
105	James V. McClintic	D	OK-07	March 4, 1915	5th term	
106	Louis Thomas McFadden	R	PA-15	March 4, 1915	5th term	
107	Merrill Moores	R	IN-07	March 4, 1915	5th term	Left the House in 1925.
108	Sydney Emanuel Mudd II	R	MD-05	March 4, 1915	5th term	Died on October 11, 1924.
109	William Bacon Oliver	D	AL-06	March 4, 1915	5th term	
110	Christian William Ramseyer	R	IA-06	March 4, 1915	5th term	
111	Thomas D. Schall	R	MN-10	March 4, 1915	5th term	Left the House in 1925.
112	Frank D. Scott	R	MI-11	March 4, 1915	5th term	
113	William J. Sears	D	FL-04	March 4, 1915	5th term	
114	Homer P. Snyder	R	NY-33	March 4, 1915	5th term	Left the House in 1925.
115	Henry B. Steagall	D	AL-03	March 4, 1915	5th term	
116	John N. Tillman	D	AR-03	March 4, 1915	5th term	
117	John Q. Tilson	R	CT-03	March 4, 1915; Previous service, 1909–1913.	7th term*	
118	Charles B. Timberlake	R	CO-02	March 4, 1915	5th term	
119	George H. Tinkham	R	MA-11	March 4, 1915	5th term	
120	Charles B. Ward	R	NY-27	March 4, 1915	5th term	Left the House in 1925.
121	Edward Hills Wason	R	NH-02	March 4, 1915	5th term	
122	Henry Winfield Watson	R	PA-09	March 4, 1915	5th term	
123	Thomas Sutler Williams	R	IL-24	March 4, 1915	5th term	
124	Riley J. Wilson	D	LA-05	March 4, 1915	5th term	
125	James W. Wise	D	GA-06	March 4, 1915	5th term	Left the House in 1925.
126	William R. Wood	R	IN-10	March 4, 1915	5th term	
127	Bertrand Snell	R	NY-31	November 2, 1915	5th term	
128	Henry Wilson Temple	R	PA-25	November 2, 1915; Previous service, 1913–1915.	6th term*	
129	William B. Bankhead	D	AL-10	March 4, 1917	4th term	
130	Thomas L. Blanton	D	TX-17	March 4, 1917	4th term	
131	Charles Hillyer Brand	D	GA-08	March 4, 1917	4th term	
132	Guy Edgar Campbell	R	PA-36	March 4, 1917	4th term	
133	Tom Connally	D	TX-11	March 4, 1917	4th term	
134	Frederick H. Dominick	D	SC-03	March 4, 1917	4th term	
135	Herbert J. Drane	D	FL-01	March 4, 1917	4th term	
136	Louis W. Fairfield	R	IN-12	March 4, 1917	4th term	Left the House in 1925.
137	Hubert Fisher	D	TN-10	March 4, 1917	4th term	
138	Burton L. French	R	ID-01	March 4, 1917; Previous service, 1903–1909 and 1911–1915.	9th term**	
139	William J. Graham	R	IL-14	March 4, 1917	4th term	Resigned on June 7, 1924.
140	Ira G. Hersey	R	ME-04	March 4, 1917	4th term	
141	John Marvin Jones	D	TX-18	March 4, 1917	4th term	
142	Melville Clyde Kelly	R	PA-33	March 4, 1917; Previous service, 1913–1915.	5th term*	
143	Harold Knutson	R	MN-06	March 4, 1917	4th term	
144	Joseph J. Mansfield	D	TX-09	March 4, 1917	4th term	
145	William Washington Larsen	D	GA-12	March 4, 1917	4th term	
146	Clarence F. Lea	D	CA-01	March 4, 1917	4th term	
147	Edward C. Little	R	KS-02	March 4, 1917	4th term	Died on June 27, 1924.
148	John Franklin Miller	R	WA-01	March 4, 1917	4th term	
149	Fred S. Purnell	R	IN-09	March 4, 1917	4th term	
150	Stuart F. Reed	R	WV-03	March 4, 1917	4th term	Left the House in 1925.
151	Archie D. Sanders	R	NY-39	March 4, 1917	4th term	
152	Everett Sanders	R	IN-05	March 4, 1917	4th term	Left the House in 1925.
153	William Francis Stevenson	D	SC-05	March 4, 1917	4th term	
154	Nathan Leroy Strong	R	PA-27	March 4, 1917	4th term	
155	Christopher D. Sullivan	D	NY-13	March 4, 1917	4th term	
156	Albert Henry Vestal	R	IN-08	March 4, 1917	4th term	
157	Edward Voigt	R	WI-02	March 4, 1917	4th term	
158	Wallace H. White, Jr.	R	ME-02	March 4, 1917	4th term	
159	Frederick Nicholas Zihlman	R	MD-06	March 4, 1917	4th term	
160	Richard N. Elliott	R	IN-06	June 29, 1917	4th term	
161	Schuyler Merritt	R	CT-04	November 6, 1917	4th term	
162	William C. Wright	D	GA-04	January 16, 1918	4th term	
163	Anthony J. Griffin	D	NY-22	March 5, 1918	4th term	
164	John W. Rainey	D	IL-04	April 2, 1918	4th term	Died on May 4, 1923.
165	S. Otis Bland	D	VA-01	July 2, 1918	4th term	
166	Florian Lampert	R	WI-06	November 5, 1918	4th term	
167	Ernest Robinson Ackerman	R	NJ-05	March 4, 1919	3rd term	
168	Henry E. Barbour	R	CA-07	March 4, 1919	3rd term	
169	James T. Begg	R	OH-13	March 4, 1919	3rd term	
170	William D. Boies	R	IA-11	March 4, 1919	3rd term	
171	John C. Box	D	TX-02	March 4, 1919	3rd term	
172	Clay Stone Briggs	D	TX-07	March 4, 1919	3rd term	
173	Clark Burdick	R	RI-01	March 4, 1919	3rd term	
174	R. Clint Cole	R	OH-08	March 4, 1919	3rd term	Left the House in 1925.
175	Thomas H. Cullen	D	NY-04	March 4, 1919	3rd term	
176	Ewin Lamar Davis	D	TN-05	March 4, 1919	3rd term	
177	Carl Richard Chindblom	R	IL-10	March 4, 1919	3rd term	
178	Frank Crowther	R	NY-30	March 4, 1919	3rd term	
179	Charles A. Christopherson	R	SD-01	March 4, 1919	3rd term	
180	Lester J. Dickinson	R	IA-10	March 4, 1919	3rd term	
181	Israel Moore Foster	R	OH-10	March 4, 1919	3rd term	Left the House in 1925.
182	Guy U. Hardy	R	CO-03	March 4, 1919	3rd term	
183	Andrew J. Hickey	R	IN-13	March 4, 1919	3rd term	
184	Homer Hoch	R	KS-04	March 4, 1919	3rd term	
185	Claude Benton Hudspeth	D	TX-16	March 4, 1919	3rd term	
186	Samuel Austin Kendall	R	PA-24	March 4, 1919	3rd term	
187	William Chester Lankford	D	GA-11	March 4, 1919	3rd term	
188	Robert Luce	R	MA-13	March 4, 1919	3rd term	
189	Clarence MacGregor	R	NY-41	March 4, 1919	3rd term	
190	James M. Mead	D	NY-42	March 4, 1919	3rd term	
191	John McDuffie	D	AL-01	March 4, 1919	3rd term	
192	Melvin O. McLaughlin	R	NE-04	March 4, 1919	3rd term	
193	Earl C. Michener	R	MI-02	March 4, 1919	3rd term	
194	C. Ellis Moore	R	OH-15	March 4, 1919	3rd term	
195	B. Frank Murphy	R	OH-18	March 4, 1919	3rd term	
196	Cleveland A. Newton	R	MO-10	March 4, 1919	3rd term	
197	Walter Newton	R	MN-05	March 4, 1919	3rd term	
198	Daniel A. Reed	R	NY-43	March 4, 1919	3rd term	
199	John M. Robsion	R	KY-11	March 4, 1919	3rd term	
200	Milton William Shreve	R	PA-29	March 4, 1919; Previous service, 1913–1915.	4th term*	
201	James H. Sinclair	R	ND-03	March 4, 1919	3rd term	
202	John H. Smithwick	D	FL-03	March 4, 1919	3rd term	
203	Ambrose E. B. Stephens	R	OH-02	March 4, 1919	3rd term	
204	James G. Strong	R	KS-05	March 4, 1919	3rd term	
205	John W. Summers	R	WA-04	March 4, 1919	3rd term	
206	J. Will Taylor	R	TN-02	March 4, 1919	3rd term	
207	Charles J. Thompson	R	OH-05	March 4, 1919	3rd term	
208	Jasper N. Tincher	R	KS-07	March 4, 1919	3rd term	
209	William David Upshaw	D	GA-05	March 4, 1919	3rd term	
210	William N. Vaile	R	CO-01	March 4, 1919	3rd term	
211	Zebulon Weaver	D	NC-10	March 4, 1919; Previous service, 1917–1919.	4th term*	
212	J. Stanley Webster	R	WA-05	March 4, 1919	3rd term	Resigned on May 8, 1923.
213	Hays B. White	R	KS-06	March 4, 1919	3rd term	
214	Richard Yates, Jr.	R	IL	March 4, 1919	3rd term	
215	Fritz G. Lanham	D	TX-12	April 19, 1919	3rd term	
216	R. Walton Moore	D	VA-08	April 27, 1919	3rd term	
217	James O'Connor	D	LA-01	June 5, 1919	3rd term	
218	Oscar Keller	R	MN-04	July 1, 1919	3rd term	
219	Peter Francis Tague	D	MA-10	October 23, 1919; Previous service, 1915–1919.	5th term*	Left the House in 1925.
220	Patrick H. Drewry	D	VA-04	April 27, 1920	3rd term	
221	Hamilton Fish, Jr.	R	NY-26	November 2, 1920	3rd term	
222	Francis F. Patterson, Jr.	R	NJ-01	November 2, 1920	3rd term	
223	Nathan D. Perlman	R	NY-14	November 2, 1920	3rd term	
224	Harry C. Ransley	R	PA-03	November 2, 1920	3rd term	
225	William B. Bowling	D	AL-05	December 14, 1920	3rd term	
226	Joseph D. Beck	R	WI-07	March 4, 1921	2nd term	
227	Carroll L. Beedy	R	ME-01	March 4, 1921	2nd term	
228	Harris Jacob Bixler	R	PA-28	March 4, 1921	2nd term	
229	Olger B. Burtness	R	ND-01	March 4, 1921	2nd term	
230	Theodore E. Burton	R	OH-22	March 4, 1921; Previous service, 1889–1891 and 1895–1909.	10th term**	
231	Alfred L. Bulwinkle	D	NC-09	March 4, 1921	2nd term	
232	John L. Cable	R	OH-04	March 4, 1921	2nd term	Left the House in 1925.
233	Frank Clague	R	MN-02	March 4, 1921	2nd term	
234	John D. Clarke	R	NY-34	March 4, 1921	2nd term	Left the House in 1925.
235	Ross A. Collins	D	MS-05	March 4, 1921	2nd term	
236	Don B. Colton	R	UT-01	March 4, 1921	2nd term	
237	James J. Connolly	R	PA-05	March 4, 1921	2nd term	
238	Henry Allen Cooper	R	WI-01	March 4, 1921; Previous service, 1893–1919.	14th term*	
239	Joseph T. Deal	D	VA-02	March 4, 1921	2nd term	
240	William J. Driver	D	AR-01	March 4, 1921	2nd term	
241	Roy G. Fitzgerald	R	OH-03	March 4, 1921	2nd term	
242	Louis A. Frothingham	R	MA-14	March 4, 1921	2nd term	
243	Charles L. Faust	R	MO-04	March 4, 1921	2nd term	
244	George K. Favrot	D	LA-06	March 4, 1921; Previous service, 1907–1909.	3rd term*	Left the House in 1925.
245	E. Hart Fenn	R	CT-01	March 4, 1921	2nd term	
246	Arthur M. Free	R	CA-08	March 4, 1921	2nd term	
247	Hampton P. Fulmer	D	SC-07	March 4, 1921	2nd term	
248	Frank H. Funk	R	IL-17	March 4, 1921	2nd term	
249	Daniel E. Garrett	D	TX-08	March 4, 1921; Previous service, 1913–1915 and 1917–1919.	4th term**	
250	Ralph Waldo Emerson Gilbert	D	KY-08	March 4, 1921	2nd term	
251	Thomas Alan Goldsborough	D	MD-01	March 4, 1921	2nd term	
252	William C. Hammer	D	NC-07	March 4, 1921	2nd term	
253	Harry B. Hawes	D	MO-11	March 4, 1921	2nd term	
254	John Boynton Philip Clayton Hill	R	MD-03	March 4, 1921	2nd term	
255	John C. Ketcham	R	MI-04	March 4, 1921	2nd term	
256	John J. Kindred	D	NY-02	March 4, 1921; Previous service, 1911–1913.	3rd term*	
257	William F. Kopp	R	IA-01	March 4, 1921	2nd term	
258	Stanley H. Kunz	D	IL-08	March 4, 1921	2nd term	
259	Oscar Larson	R	MN-08	March 4, 1921	2nd term	Left the House in 1925.
260	Elmer O. Leatherwood	R	UT-02	March 4, 1921	2nd term	
261	W. Turner Logan	D	SC-01	March 4, 1921	2nd term	Left the House in 1925.
262	Bill G. Lowrey	D	MS-02	March 4, 1921	2nd term	
263	Homer L. Lyon	D	NC-06	March 4, 1921	2nd term	
264	John J. McSwain	D	SC-04	March 4, 1921	2nd term	
265	M. Alfred Michaelson	R	IL-07	March 4, 1921	2nd term	
266	Ogden L. Mills	R	NY-17	March 4, 1921	2nd term	
267	Allen F. Moore	R	IL-19	March 4, 1921	2nd term	Left the House in 1925.
268	William M. Morgan	R	OH-17	March 4, 1921	2nd term	
269	John M. Nelson	R	WI-03	March 4, 1921; Previous service, 1906–1919.	9th term*	
270	Charles F. X. O'Brien	D	NJ-12	March 4, 1921	2nd term	Left the House in 1925.
271	Tilman B. Parks	D	AR-07	March 4, 1921	2nd term	
272	Randolph Perkins	R	NJ-06	March 4, 1921	2nd term	
273	John E. Rankin	D	MS-01	March 4, 1921	2nd term	
274	B. Carroll Reece	R	TN-01	March 4, 1921	2nd term	
275	Sidney C. Roach	R	MO-08	March 4, 1921	2nd term	Left the House in 1925.
276	Benjamin L. Rosenbloom	R	WV-01	March 4, 1921	2nd term	Left the House in 1925.
277	Morgan G. Sanders	D	TX-03	March 4, 1921	2nd term	
278	John N. Sandlin	D	LA-04	March 4, 1921	2nd term	
279	John C. Speaks	R	OH-12	March 4, 1921	2nd term	
280	Elliott W. Sproul	R	IL-03	March 4, 1921	2nd term	
281	Fletcher B. Swank	D	OK-05	March 4, 1921	2nd term	
282	Phil Swing	R	CA-11	March 4, 1921	2nd term	
283	John R. Tyson	D	AL-02	March 4, 1921	2nd term	Died on March 27, 1923.
284	Charles L. Underhill	R	MA-09	March 4, 1921	2nd term	
285	Hallett Sydney Ward	D	NC-01	March 4, 1921	2nd term	Left the House in 1925.
286	William Williamson	R	SD-03	March 4, 1921	2nd term	
287	Roy O. Woodruff	R	MI-10	March 4, 1921; Previous service, 1913–1915.	3rd term*	
288	Harry M. Wurzbach	R	TX-14	March 4, 1921	2nd term	
289	Adam Martin Wyant	R	PA-31	March 4, 1921	2nd term	
290	Walter F. Lineberger	R	CA-09	April 11, 1921	2nd term	
291	Lamar Jeffers	D	AL-04	June 7, 1921	2nd term	
292	John M. C. Smith	R	MI-03	June 28, 1921; Previous service, 1911–1921.	7th term*	Died on March 30, 1923.
293	Cyrenus Cole	R	IA-05	August 1, 1921	2nd term	
294	A. Piatt Andrew	R	MA-06	September 27, 1921	2nd term	
295	J. Murray Hooker	D	VA-05	November 8, 1921	2nd term	Left the House in 1925.
296	John E. Nelson	R	ME-03	March 20, 1922	2nd term	
297	Henry St. George Tucker	D	VA-10	March 21, 1922; Previous service, 1889–1897.	6th term*	
298	Guinn Williams	D	TX-13	May 22, 1922	2nd term	
299	Charles Laban Abernethy	D	NC-03	November 7, 1922	2nd term	
300	Charles L. Gifford	R	MA-16	November 7, 1922	2nd term	
301	James H. MacLafferty	R	CA-06	November 7, 1922	2nd term	Left the House in 1925.
302	Mae Nolan	R	CA-05	January 23, 1923	2nd term	Left the House in 1925.
303	Richard S. Aldrich	R	RI-02	March 4, 1923	1st term	
304	Robert E. Lee Allen	D	WV-02	March 4, 1923	1st term	Left the House in 1925.
305	Miles C. Allgood	D	AL-07	March 4, 1923	1st term	
306	William W. Arnold	D	IL-23	March 4, 1923	1st term	
307	William Augustus Ayres	D	KS-08	March 4, 1923; Previous service, 1915–1921.	4th term*	
308	Robert L. Bacon	R	NY-01	March 4, 1923	1st term	
309	Edward M. Beers	R	PA-18	March 4, 1923	1st term	
310	Victor L. Berger	Soc.	WI-05	March 4, 1923; Previous service, 1911–1913 and 1919.	3rd term**	
311	Loring Milton Black, Jr.	D	NY-05	March 4, 1923	1st term	
312	Sol Bloom	D	NY-19	March 4, 1923	1st term	
313	William H. Boyce	D	DE	March 4, 1923	1st term	Left the House in 1925.
314	John J. Boylan	D	NY-15	March 4, 1923	1st term	
315	Charles Brand	R	OH-07	March 4, 1923	1st term	
316	Charles Browne	D	NJ-04	March 4, 1923	1st term	Left the House in 1925.
317	George F. Brumm	R	PA-13	March 4, 1923	1st term	
318	Gordon Browning	D	TN-08	March 4, 1923	1st term	
319	James R. Buckley	D	IL-06	March 4, 1923	1st term	Left the House in 1925.
320	T. Jeff Busby	D	MS-04	March 4, 1923	1st term	
321	Harry C. Canfield	D	IN-04	March 4, 1923	1st term	
322	Clarence Cannon	D	MO-09	March 4, 1923	1st term	
323	John J. Casey	D	PA-12	March 4, 1923; Previous service, 1913–1917 and 1919–1921.	4th term**	Left the House in 1925.
324	Emanuel Celler	D	NY-10	March 4, 1923	1st term	
325	Robert H. Clancy	D	MI-01	March 4, 1923	1st term	Left the House in 1925.
326	William E. Cleary	D	NY-08	March 4, 1923; Previous service, 1918–1921.	3rd term*	
327	William P. Connery, Jr.	D	MA-07	March 4, 1923	1st term	
328	Samuel E. Cook	D	IN-11	March 4, 1923	1st term	Left the House in 1925.
329	Parker Corning	D	NY-28	March 4, 1923	1st term	
330	William Martin Croll	D	PA-14	March 4, 1923	1st term	Left the House in 1925.
331	Robert Crosser	D	OH-21	March 4, 1923; Previous service, 1913–1919.	4th term*	
332	Herbert Wesley Cummings	D	PA-17	March 4, 1923	1st term	Left the House in 1925.
333	Martin L. Davey	D	OH-14	March 4, 1923; Previous service, 1918–1921.	3rd term*	
334	Clement C. Dickinson	D	MO-06	March 4, 1923; Previous service, 1910–1921.	7th term*	
335	Samuel Dickstein	D	NY-12	March 4, 1923	1st term	
336	John J. Eagan	D	NJ-11	March 4, 1923; Previous service, 1913–1921.	5th term*	Left the House in 1925.
337	John M. Evans	D	MT-01	March 4, 1923; Previous service, 1913–1921.	5th term*	
338	Frederick G. Fleetwood	R	VT-01	March 4, 1923	1st term	Left the House in 1925.
339	James F. Fulbright	D	MO-14	March 4, 1923	1st term	Left the House in 1925.
340	James V. Ganly	D	NY-24	March 4, 1923; Previous service, 1919–1921.	2nd term*	Died on September 7, 1923.
341	Milton C. Garber	R	OK-08	March 4, 1923	1st term	
342	Frank Gardner	D	IN-03	March 4, 1923	1st term	
343	Allard H. Gasque	D	SC-06	March 4, 1923	1st term	
344	Elmer H. Geran	D	NJ-03	March 4, 1923	1st term	Left the House in 1925.
345	Samuel Feiser Glatfelter	D	PA-22	March 4, 1923	1st term	Left the House in 1925.
346	Arthur H. Greenwood	D	IN-02	March 4, 1923	1st term	
347	Thomas W. Harrison	D	VA-07	March 4, 1923; Previous service, 1916–1922.	5th term*	
348	William Wirt Hastings	D	OK-02	March 4, 1923; Previous service, 1915–1921.	4th term*	
349	William P. Holaday	R	IL-18	March 4, 1923	1st term	
350	Edgar Howard	D	NE-03	March 4, 1923	1st term	
351	Everette B. Howard	D	OK-01	March 4, 1923; Previous service, 1919–1921.	2nd term*	Left the House in 1925.
352	Grant M. Hudson	R	MI-06	March 4, 1923	1st term	
353	Cordell Hull	D	TN-04	March 4, 1923; Previous service, 1907–1921.	8th term*	
354	William E. Hull	R	IL-16	March 4, 1923	1st term	
355	Meyer Jacobstein	D	NY-38	March 4, 1923	1st term	
356	George W. Johnson	D	WV-04	March 4, 1923	1st term	Left the House in 1925.
357	Luther Alexander Johnson	D	TX-06	March 4, 1923	1st term	
358	Henry L. Jost	D	MO-05	March 4, 1923	1st term	Left the House in 1925.
359	Everett Kent	D	PA-30	March 4, 1923	1st term	Left the House in 1925.
360	Jacob Banks Kurtz	R	PA-21	March 4, 1923	1st term	
361	Ole J. Kvale	R	MN-07	March 4, 1923	1st term	
362	Fiorello H. La Guardia	R	NY-20	March 4, 1923; Previous service, 1917–1919.	3rd term*	
363	Scott Leavitt	R	MT-02	March 4, 1923	1st term	
364	Thomas Jefferson Lilly	D	WV-05	March 4, 1923	1st term	Left the House in 1925.
365	George W. Lindsay	D	NY-03	March 4, 1923	1st term	
366	Ralph F. Lozier	D	MO-02	March 4, 1923	1st term	
367	James McDevitt Magee	R	PA-35	March 4, 1923	1st term	
368	James Earl Major	D	IL-21	March 4, 1923	1st term	Left the House in 1925.
369	Samuel C. Major	D	MO-07	March 4, 1923; Previous service, 1919–1921.	2nd term*	
370	Joe J. Manlove	R	MO-15	March 4, 1923	1st term	
371	Tom D. McKeown	D	OK-04	March 4, 1923; Previous service, 1917–1921.	3rd term*	
372	Clarence J. McLeod	R	MI-13	March 4, 1923; Previous service, 1920–1921.	2nd term*	
373	Frank Joseph McNulty	D	NJ-08	March 4, 1923	1st term	Left the House in 1925.
374	Samuel Davis McReynolds	D	TN-03	March 4, 1923	1st term	
375	John McSweeney	D	OH-16	March 4, 1923	1st term	
376	Edward E. Miller	R	IL-22	March 4, 1923	1st term	Left the House in 1925.
377	Jacob L. Milligan	D	MO-03	March 4, 1923; Previous service, 1920–1921.	2nd term*	
378	Daniel F. Minahan	D	NJ-09	March 4, 1923; Previous service, 1919–1921.	2nd term*	Left the House in 1925.
379	John H. Morehead	D	NE-01	March 4, 1923	1st term	
380	Charles A. Mooney	D	OH-20	March 4, 1923; Previous service, 1919–1921.	2nd term*	
381	Robert Lee Moore	D	GA-01	March 4, 1923	1st term	Left the House in 1925.
382	John Morrow	D	NM	March 4, 1923	1st term	
383	David J. O'Connell	D	NY-09	March 4, 1923; Previous service, 1919–1921.	2nd term*	
384	Jeremiah E. O'Connell	D	RI-03	March 4, 1923	1st term	
385	Patrick B. O'Sullivan	D	CT-05	March 4, 1923	1st term	Left the House in 1925.
386	Frank A. Oliver	D	NY-23	March 4, 1923	1st term	
387	Hubert H. Peavey	R	WI-11	March 4, 1923	1st term	
388	George C. Peery	D	VA-09	March 4, 1923	1st term	
389	Thomas Wharton Phillips, Jr.	R	PA-26	March 4, 1923	1st term	
390	John Quayle	D	NY-07	March 4, 1923	1st term	
391	Heartsill Ragon	D	AR-05	March 4, 1923	1st term	
392	Henry Thomas Rainey	D	IL-20	March 4, 1923; Previous service, 1903–1921.	10th term*	
393	Henry Riggs Rathbone	R	IL	March 4, 1923	1st term	
394	Frank R. Reid	R	IL-11	March 4, 1923	1st term	
395	Charles L. Richards	D	NV	March 4, 1923	1st term	Left the House in 1925.
396	Thomas J. B. Robinson	R	IA-03	March 4, 1923	1st term	
397	William Nathaniel Rogers	D	NH-01	March 4, 1923	1st term	Left the House in 1925.
398	Milton A. Romjue	D	MO-01	March 4, 1923; Previous service, 1917–1921.	3rd term*	
399	Thomas L. Rubey	D	MO-16	March 4, 1923; Previous service, 1911–1921.	6th term*	
400	William Charles Salmon	D	TN-07	March 4, 1923	1st term	Left the House in 1925.
401	Lewis E. Sawyer	D	AR-06	March 4, 1923	1st term	Died on May 5, 1923.
402	John C. Schafer	R	WI-04	March 4, 1923	1st term	
403	George J. Schneider	R	WI-09	March 4, 1923	1st term	
404	Willis G. Sears	R	NE-02	March 4, 1923	1st term	
405	George N. Seger	R	NJ-07	March 4, 1923	1st term	
406	Ashton C. Shallenberger	D	NE-05	March 4, 1923; Previous service, 1901–1903 and 1915–1919.	4th term**	
407	Isaac R. Sherwood	D	OH-09	March 4, 1923; Previous service, 1873–1875 and 1907–1921.	9th term**	Left the House in 1925.
408	Robert G. Simmons	R	NE-06	March 4, 1923	1st term	
409	Frank Crawford Sites	D	PA-19	March 4, 1923	1st term	Left the House in 1925.
410	Gale H. Stalker	R	NY-37	March 4, 1923	1st term	
411	Charles I. Stengle	D	NY-06	March 4, 1923	1st term	Left the House in 1925.
412	William Irvin Swoope	R	PA-23	March 4, 1923	1st term	
413	John Taber	R	NY-36	March 4, 1923	1st term	
414	J. Alfred Taylor	D	WV-06	March 4, 1923	1st term	
415	Maurice Thatcher	R	KY-05	March 4, 1923	1st term	
416	Elmer Thomas	D	OK-06	March 4, 1923	1st term	
417	Millard Tydings	D	MD-02	March 4, 1923	1st term	
418	William H. Sproul	R	KS-03	March 4, 1923	1st term	
419	Mell G. Underwood	D	OH-11	March 4, 1923	1st term	
420	Bird J. Vincent	R	MI-08	March 4, 1923	1st term	
421	J. Mayhew Wainwright	R	NY-25	March 4, 1923	1st term	
422	Elton Watkins	D	OR-03	March 4, 1923	1st term	Left the House in 1925.
423	Laurence Hawley Watres	R	PA-11	March 4, 1923	1st term	
424	Knud Wefald	R	MN-09	March 4, 1923	1st term	
425	Royal Hurlburt Weller	D	NY-21	March 4, 1923	1st term	
426	George Austin Welsh	R	PA-06	March 4, 1923	1st term	
427	George M. Wertz	R	PA-20	March 4, 1923	1st term	Left the House in 1925.
428	T. Webber Wilson	D	MS-06	March 4, 1923	1st term	
429	William E. Wilson	D	IN-01	March 4, 1923	1st term	Left the House in 1925.
430	Charles E. Winter	R	WY	March 4, 1923	1st term	
431	J. Scott Wolff	D	MO-13	March 4, 1923	1st term	Left the House in 1925.
432	Clifton A. Woodrum	D	VA-06	March 4, 1923	1st term	
	Morton D. Hull	R	IL-02	April 3, 1923	1st term	
	John D. Fredericks	R	CA-10	May 1, 1923	1st term	
	Hiram Kinsman Evans	R	IA-08	June 4, 1923	1st term	Left the House in 1925.
	Arthur B. Williams	R	MI-03	June 19, 1923	1st term	
	J. Lister Hill	D	AL-02	August 14, 1923	1st term	
	Samuel B. Hill	D	WA-05	September 25, 1923	1st term	
	James B. Reed	D	AR-06	October 6, 1923	1st term	
	Thomas A. Doyle	D	IL-04	November 6, 1923	1st term	
	Ernest Willard Gibson	R	VT-02	November 6, 1923	1st term	
	Benjamin L. Fairchild	R	NY-24	November 6, 1923; Previous service, 1895–1897, 1917–1919 and 1921–1923.	4th term***	
	John H. Kerr	D	NC-02	November 6, 1923	1st term	
	John J. O'Connor	D	NY-16	November 6, 1923	1st term	
	Anning Smith Prall	D	NY-11	November 6, 1923	1st term	
	Thaddeus C. Sweet	R	NY-32	November 6, 1923	1st term	
	William Y. Humphreys	D	MS-03	November 27, 1923	1st term	Left the House in 1925.
	Joseph W. Morris	D	KY-07	November 30, 1923	1st term	Left the House in 1925.
	Fred M. Vinson	D	KY-09	January 24, 1924	1st term	
	James Z. Spearing	D	LA-02	April 22, 1924	1st term	
	Stephen Warfield Gambrill	D	MD-05	November 4, 1924	1st term	
	Ulysses Samuel Guyer	R	KS-02	November 4, 1924	1st term	Left the House in 1925.
	Thomas Hall	R	ND-02	November 4, 1924	1st term	
	Robert M. Leach	R	MA-15	November 4, 1924	1st term	Left the House in 1925.

== Delegates ==
Rank	Delegate	Party	District	Seniority date (Previous service, if any)	No.# of term(s)	Notes
1	Félix Córdova Dávila		PR	August 7, 1917	4th term	
2	Isauro Gabaldon		PHL	March 4, 1920	3rd term	
3	Daniel Sutherland	R	AK	March 4, 1921	2nd term	
4	Pedro Guevara	Nac	PHL	March 4, 1923	1st term	
5	William Paul Jarrett	D	HI	March 4, 1923	1st term	

== See also ==
- 68th United States Congress
- List of United States congressional districts
- List of United States senators in the 68th Congress
