= 1924 United States Senate election in Minnesota =

- November 4, 1924
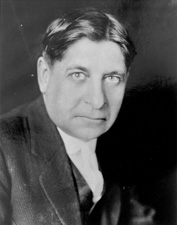

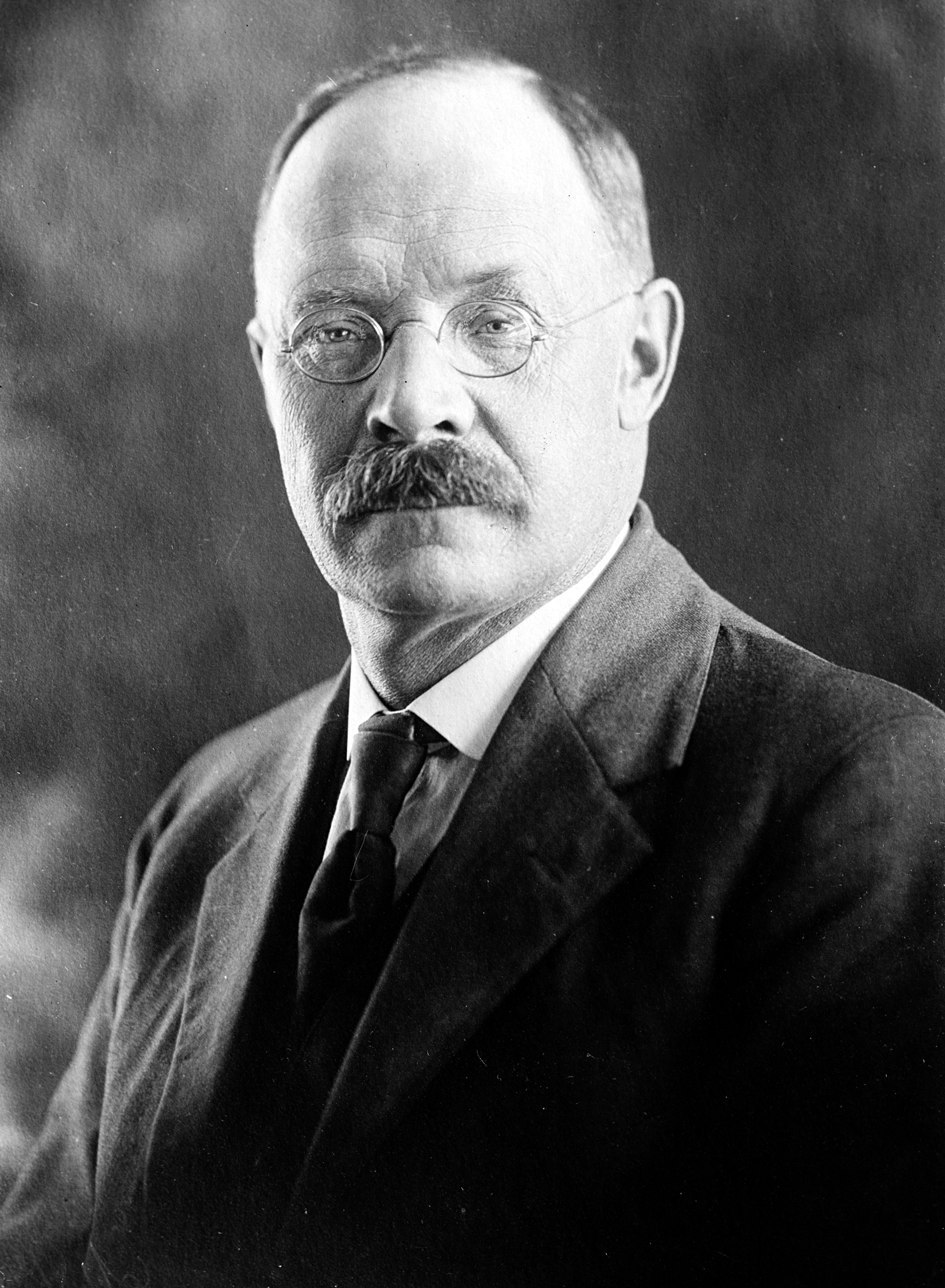

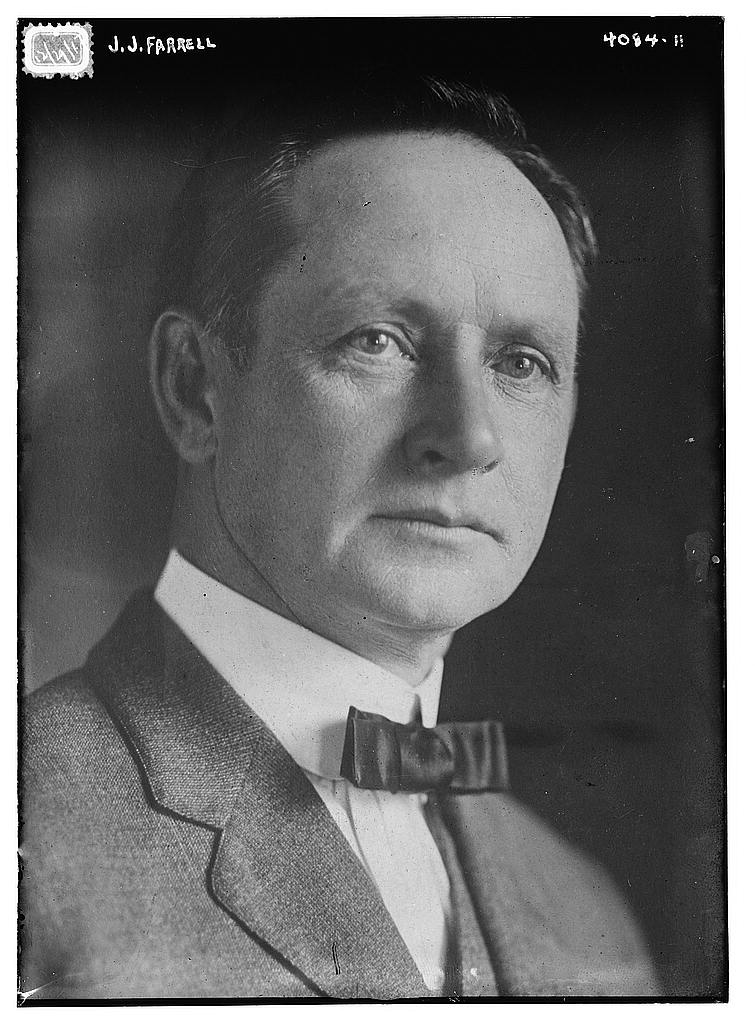
Nominee	Thomas D. Schall	Magnus Johnson	John J. Farrell
Party	Republican	Farmer–Labor	Democratic
Popular vote	388,594	380,646	53,709
Percentage	46.45%	45.50%	6.42%
- County results Schall: 40–50% 50–60% 60–70% Johnson: 40–50% 50–60% 60–70%
U.S. senator before election
Magnus Johnson
Farmer–Labor
Elected U.S. Senator
Thomas D. Schall
Republican

The 1924 United States Senate election in Minnesota took place on November 4, 1924. Republican U.S. Representative Thomas D. Schall defeated incumbent Farmer–Labor U.S. Senator Magnus Johnson and Democratic challenger John J. Farrell. Johnson, who was elected in the 1923 special election, had been in office for less than a year and a half when his attempt to win a full six-year term was defeated by Schall, by a narrow margin of 7,948 votes.

== Farmer–Labor primary ==
=== Candidates ===
==== Declared ====
- Hjalmar Dantes, Resident of Orr, endorsed by the state Communist Party
- Michael Ferch, Banker and farmer from Minneapolis, Republican nominee for the 56th Senate District in 1906, Independent Progressive candidate for governor in 1924
- Magnus Johnson, Incumbent U.S. Senator since 1923

=== Results ===
Farmer–Labor primary election results
Party	Candidate	Votes	%
Farmer–Labor	Magnus Johnson (Incumbent)	174,343	88.43%
Farmer–Labor	Michael Ferch	15,254	7.74%
Farmer–Labor	Hjalmar Dantes	7,548	3.83%
Total votes		197,145	100.00%

== Republican primary ==
=== Candidates ===
==== Declared ====
- Oscar Hallam, Associate justice of the Minnesota Supreme Court since 1912
- Ole Sageng, former State Senator from the 50th district (1915–1923) and 59th district (1907–1915), and former State Representative from the 59th district (1901–1903)
- Thomas D. Schall, U.S. Representative from Minnesota's 10th congressional district since 1915

==== Declined ====
- Theodore Christianson, State Representative (Running for Governor)

=== Results ===
Republican primary election results
Party	Candidate	Votes	%
Republican	Thomas D. Schall	81,701	35.46%
Republican	Oscar Hallam	80,491	34.94%
Republican	Ole Sageng	68,198	29.60%
Total votes		230,390	100.00%

== General election ==
=== Results ===
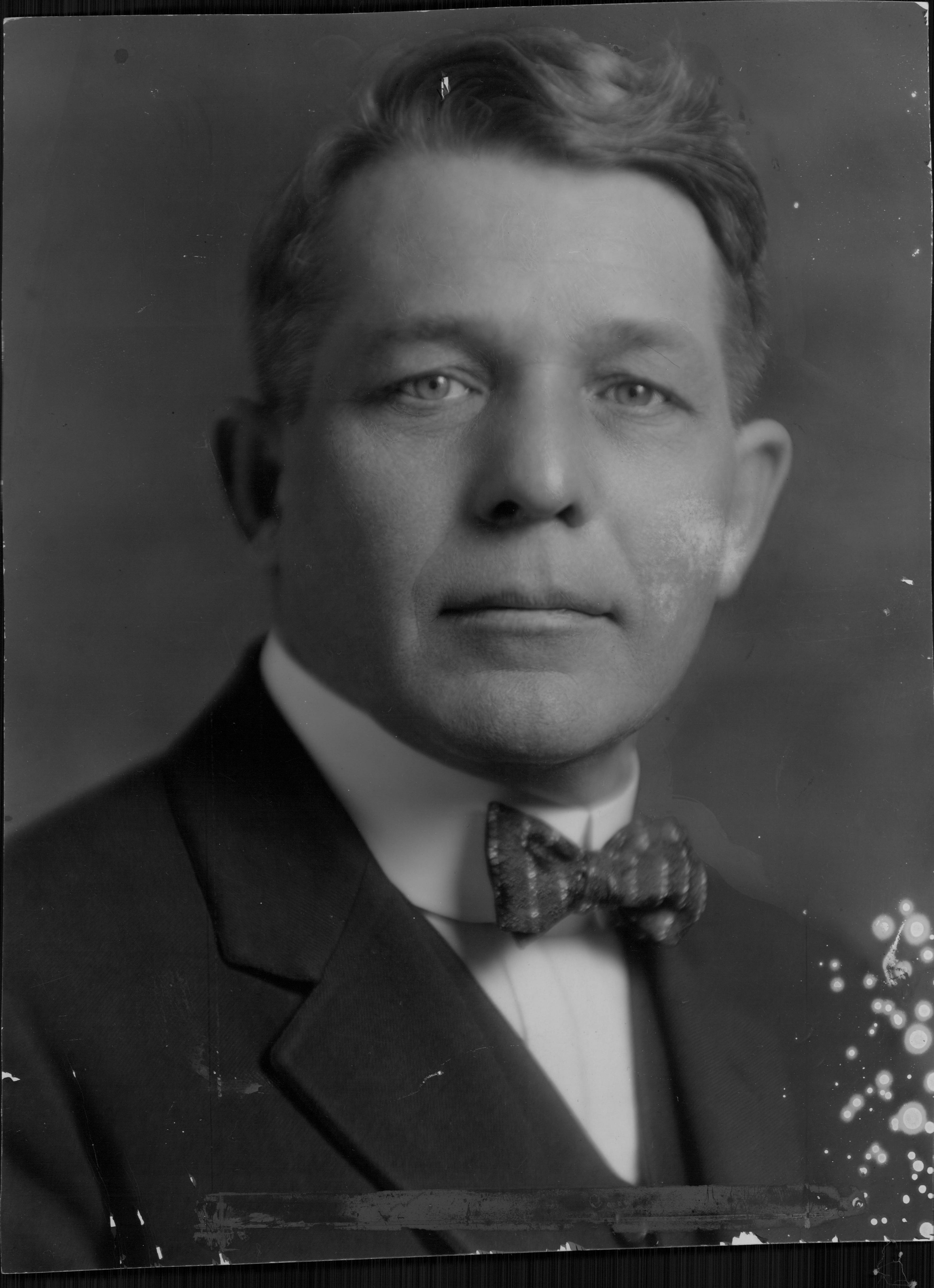
Merle Birmingham

General election results
Party	Candidate	Votes	%
Republican	Thomas D. Schall	388,594	46.45%
Farmer–Labor	Magnus Johnson (Incumbent)	380,646	45.50%
Democratic	John J. Farrell	53,709	6.42%
Independent	Merle Birmingham	8,620	1.03%
Independent	Thomas Keefe	4,994	0.60%
Total votes		836,563	100.00%
Majority		7,948	0.95%
Republican gain from Farmer–Labor			

== See also ==
- United States Senate elections, 1924 and 1925
