= List of United States senators in the 68th Congress =

This is a complete list of United States senators during the 68th United States Congress listed by seniority from March 4, 1923, to March 3, 1925.

Order of service is based on the commencement of the senator's first term. Behind this is former service as a senator (only giving the senator seniority within their new incoming class), service as vice president, a House member, a cabinet secretary, or a governor of a state. The final factor is the population of the senator's state.

Senators who were sworn in during the middle of the Congress (up until the last senator who was not sworn in early after winning the November 1924 election) are listed at the end of the list with no number.

== Terms of service ==
Class	Terms of service of senators that expired in years
Class 2	Terms of service of senators that expired in 1925 (AL, AR, CO, DE, GA, IA, ID, IL, KS, KY, LA, MA, ME, MI, MN, MS, MT, NC, NE, NH, NJ, NM, OK, OR, RI, SC, SD, TN, TX, VA, WV, and WY.)
Class 3	Terms of service of senators that expired in 1927 (AL, AR, AZ, CA, CO, CT, FL, GA, ID, IL, IN, IA, KS, KY, LA, MD, MO, NC, ND, NH, NV, NY, OH, OK, OR, PA, SC, SD, UT, VT, WA, and WI.)
Class 1	Terms of service of senators that expired in 1929 (AZ, CA, CT, DE, FL, IN, MA, MD, ME, MI, MN, MO, MS, MT, ND, NE, NJ, NM, NV, NY, OH, PA, RI, TN, TX, UT, VA, VT, WA, WI, WV, and WY.)

== U.S. Senate seniority list ==
U.S. Senate seniority
Rank	Senator (party-state)	Seniority date	Other factors
1	Henry Cabot Lodge (R-MA)	March 4, 1893	
2	Francis E. Warren (R-WY)	March 4, 1895	Previously a senator
3	Knute Nelson (R-MN)	March 4, 1895	
4	William P. Dillingham (R-VT)	October 18, 1900	
5	Furnifold M. Simmons (D-NC)	March 4, 1901	
6	Lee S. Overman (D-NC)	March 4, 1903	North Carolina 15th in population (1900)
7	Reed Smoot (R-UT)	March 4, 1903	Utah 41st in population (1900)
8	Frank B. Brandegee (R-CT)	May 10, 1905	
9	Robert M. La Follette, Sr. (R-WI)	January 4, 1906	
10	William Borah (R-ID)	March 4, 1907	
11	Robert Owen (D-OK)	December 11, 1907	
12	Albert B. Cummins (R-IA)	November 24, 1908	
13	Wesley Jones (R-WA)	March 4, 1909	Former representative
14	Ellison D. Smith (D-SC)	March 4, 1909	South Carolina 24th in population (1900)
15	Duncan U. Fletcher (D-FL)	March 4, 1909	Florida 33rd in population (1900)
16	Claude A. Swanson (D-VA)	August 1, 1910	
17	George P. McLean (R-CT)	March 4, 1911	Former governor
18	James A. Reed (D-MO)	March 4, 1911	
19	Henry F. Ashurst (D-AZ)	March 27, 1912	
20	Key Pittman (D-NV)	January 29, 1913	
21	Morris Sheppard (D-TX)	February 3, 1913	
22	Joseph E. Ransdell (D-LA)	March 4, 1913	Former representative (14 years)
23	Joseph Robinson (R-AR)	March 4, 1913	Former representative (10 years), former governor
24	George W. Norris (R-NE)	March 4, 1913	Former representative (10 years)
25	John Shields (D-TN)	March 4, 1913	Tennessee 17th in population (1910)
26	Thomas Sterling (R-SD)	March 4, 1913	South Dakota 36th in population (1910)
27	LeBaron Colt (R-RI)	March 4, 1913	Rhode Island 38th in population (1910)
28	Thomas J. Walsh (D-MT)	March 4, 1913	Montana 40th in population (1910)
29	Charles Curtis (R-KS)	March 4, 1915	Previously a senator
30	Oscar Underwood (D-AL)	March 4, 1915	Former representative
31	James Wadsworth, Jr. (R-NY)	March 4, 1915	
32	Bert Fernald (R-ME)	September 12, 1916	
33	James Watson (R-IN)	November 8, 1916	
34	Kenneth McKellar (D-TN)	March 4, 1917	Former representative (6 years)
35	William H. King (D-UT)	March 4, 1917	Former representative (3 years)
36	Peter G. Gerry (D-RI)	March 4, 1917	Former representative (2 years)
37	Park Trammell (D-FL)	March 4, 1917	Former governor, Florida 33rd in population (1910)
38	John B. Kendrick (D-WY)	March 4, 1917	Former governor, Wyoming 47th in population (1910)
39	Frederick Hale (R-ME)	March 4, 1917	Maine 34th in population (1910)
40	Andrieus Jones (D-NM)	March 4, 1917	New Mexico 43rd in population (1910)
41	Hiram Johnson (R-CA)	March 16, 1917	
42	Irvine Lenroot (R-WI)	April 18, 1918	
43	Selden P. Spencer (R-MO)	November 6, 1918	Missouri 7th in population (1910)
44	George H. Moses (R-NH)	November 6, 1918	New Hampshire 39th in population (1910)
45	Charles L. McNary (R-OR)	December 18, 1918	
46	Heisler Ball (R-DE)	March 4, 1919	Previously a senator (2 years)
47	Davis Elkins (R-WV)	March 4, 1919	Previously a senator (1 year)
48	Medill McCormick (R-IL)	March 4, 1919	Former representative
49	David I. Walsh (D-MA)	March 4, 1919	Former governor, Massachusetts 6th in population (1910)
50	Arthur Capper (R-KS)	March 4, 1919	Former governor, Kansas 22nd in population (1910)
51	Henry W. Keyes (R-NH)	March 4, 1919	Former governor, New Hampshire 39th in population (1910)
52	William J. Harris (D-GA)	March 4, 1919	Georgia 10th in population (1910)
53	Nathaniel Dial (D-SC)	March 4, 1919	South Carolina 26th in population (1910)
54	Lawrence C. Phipps (R-CO)	March 4, 1919	Colorado 32nd in population (1910)
55	Pat Harrison (D-MS)	March 5, 1919	
56	Augustus O. Stanley (D-KY)	May 19, 1919	Former representative (12 years)
57	Walter E. Edge (R-NJ)	May 19, 1919	Former governor, New Jersey 11th in population (1910)
58	Carter Glass (D-VA)	February 2, 1920	
59	James Thomas Heflin (D-AL)	November 2, 1920	
60	Frank B. Willis (R-OH)	January 14, 1921	
61	Frank R. Gooding (R-ID)	January 15, 1921	
62	William B. McKinley (R-IL)	March 4, 1921	Former representative (14 years)
63	Thaddeus H. Caraway (D-AR)	March 4, 1921	Former representative (8 years)
64	John Harreld (R-OK)	March 4, 1921	Former representative (2 years)
65	Ralph H. Cameron (R-AZ)	March 4, 1921	Former delegate
66	Peter Norbeck (R-SD)	March 4, 1921	Former governor, South Dakota 37th in population (1920)
67	Samuel M. Shortridge (R-CA)	March 4, 1921	California 8th in population (1920)
68	Richard P. Ernst (R-KY)	March 4, 1921	Kentucky 15th in population (1920)
69	Edwin S. Broussard (D-LA)	March 4, 1921	Louisiana 22nd in population (1920)
70	Ovington Weller (R-MD)	March 4, 1921	Maryland 28th in population (1920)
71	Samuel Nicholson (D-CO)	March 4, 1921	Colorado 33rd in population (1920)
72	Robert Stanfield (R-OR)	March 4, 1921	Oregon 34th in population (1920)
73	Edwin Ladd (R-ND)	March 4, 1921	North Dakota 36th in population (1920)
74	Tasker Oddie (R-NV)	March 4, 1921	Nevada 48th in population (1920)
75	Holm O. Bursum (R-NM)	March 11, 1921	
76	George W. Pepper (R-PA)	January 10, 1922	
77	David A. Reed (R-PA)	August 8, 1922	
78	Thomas F. Bayard, Jr. (D-DE)	November 7, 1922	
79	Walter F. George (D-GA)	November 22, 1922	
80	James Couzens (R-MI)	November 29, 1922	
81	Smith W. Brookhart (R-IA)	December 1, 1922	
82	Frank L. Greene (R-VT)	March 4, 1923	Former representative (11 years)
83	Simeon Fess (R-OH)	March 4, 1923	Former representative (10 years), Ohio 4th in population (1920)
84	Hubert D. Stephens (D-MS)	March 4, 1923	Former representative (10 years), Mississippi 23rd in population (1920)
85	Matthew M. Neely (D-WV)	March 4, 1923	Former representative (8 years)
86	Clarence Dill (D-WA)	March 4, 1923	Former representative (4 years)
87	Woodbridge N. Ferris (D-MI)	March 4, 1923	Former governor, Michigan 7th in population (1920)
88	Edward I. Edwards (D-NJ)	March 4, 1923	Former governor, New Jersey 10th in population (1920)
89	Samuel M. Ralston (D-IN)	March 4, 1923	Former governor, Indiana 11th in population (1920)
90	Lynn Frazier (R-ND)	March 4, 1923	Former governor, North Dakota 36th in population (1920)
91	Royal S. Copeland (D-NY)	March 4, 1923	New York 1st in population (1920)
92	Earle B. Mayfield (D-TX)	March 4, 1923	Texas 5th in population (1920)
93	Henrik Shipstead (FL-MN)	March 4, 1923	Minnesota 17th in population (1920)
94	William C. Bruce (D-MD)	March 4, 1923	Maryland 28th in population (1920)
95	Robert B. Howell (R-NE)	March 4, 1923	Nebraska 31st in population (1920)
96	Burton K. Wheeler (D-MT)	March 4, 1923	Montana 39th in population (1920)
—	Alva B. Adams (D-CO)	May 17, 1923	
—	Magnus Johnson (FL-MN)	July 17, 1923	
—	Porter H. Dale (R-VT)	November 7, 1923	
—	Jesse H. Metcalf (R-RI)	November 4, 1924	
—	William M. Butler (R-MA)	November 13, 1924	
—	Rice W. Means (R-CO)	December 1, 1924	
—	Hiram Bingham (R-CT)	December 17, 1924	
—	Charles S. Deneen (R-IL)	February 26, 1925	

== See also ==
- 68th United States Congress
- List of United States representatives in the 68th Congress
