= Ole O. Sageng =

American farmer, educator, and politician

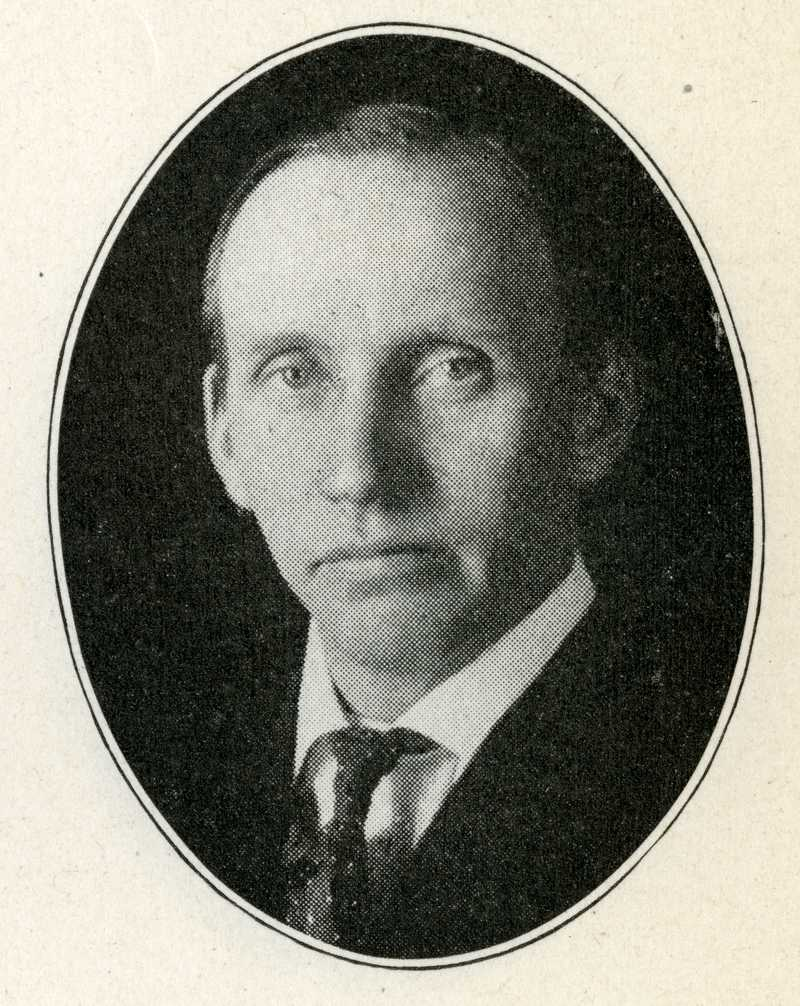
- Sageng in 1915

Member of the Minnesota House of Representatives from the 59th district
- In office January 7, 1901 – January 4, 1903
- Preceded by: Edmund C. Weston
- Succeeded by: Charles N. Haugen

Member of the Minnesota Senate from the 59th district
- In office January 7, 1907 – January 3, 1915
- Preceded by: Alonzo B. Cole
- Succeeded by: George M. Peterson

Member of the Minnesota Senate from the 50th district
- In office January 3, 1915 – December 31, 1922
- Preceded by: Thomas M. Pugh
- Succeeded by: Charles A. Lund

Member of the Minnesota Senate from the 50th district
- In office January 1, 1950 – January 2, 1955
- Preceded by: Colvin G. Butler
- Succeeded by: Henry Nycklemoe

Personal details
- Born: December 1, 1871 Tønset, Østerdalen, Norway
- Died: March 30, 1963 (aged 91) Tumuli Township, Minnesota
- Party: Republican; Populist Party; Prohibition
- Spouse: Carrie Brandvold (m. 1904)
- Children: 8

Ole O. Sageng (December 1, 1871 – March 30, 1963), also nicknamed "The Napoleon of Woman Suffrage" was an American farmer, educator, and politician.

Sageng was born in Østerdalen, Norway and emigrated to the United States, with his family, in 1878 and settled near Dalton, Otter Tail County, Minnesota. He went to the local public schools and graduated from the Fergus Falls High School in Fergus Falls, Minnesota. Sageng also went to Augsburg College. He lived in Dalton, Minnesota with his wife and family, was a farmer and taught school in Otter Tail County and in Grand Forks County, North Dakota. Sageng served in the Minnesota House of Representatives in 1901 and 1902 and in the Minnesota Senate from 1907 to 1914, from 1915 to 1922, and from 1951 to 1954. Sageng was a member of the Populist Party and was a supporter of women's suffrage and of Prohibition. He later joined the Republican Party.

In the 1938 United States House of Representatives elections, Sageng was the Republican nominee for Minnesota's 9th congressional district. He finished second behind incumbent Rich T. Buckler (Farmer-Labor) and ahead of Martin O. Brandon (Democratic). He ran to be the Republican nominee for the 9th district again in 1940, but lost to Colvin G. Butler who in turn lost the general to Buckler.

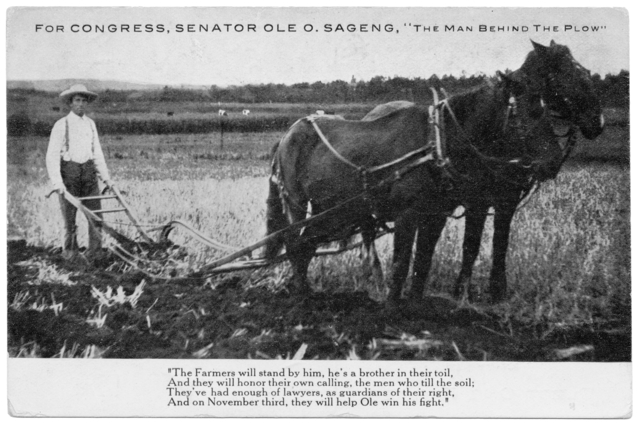
Sageng plowing his field, 1908

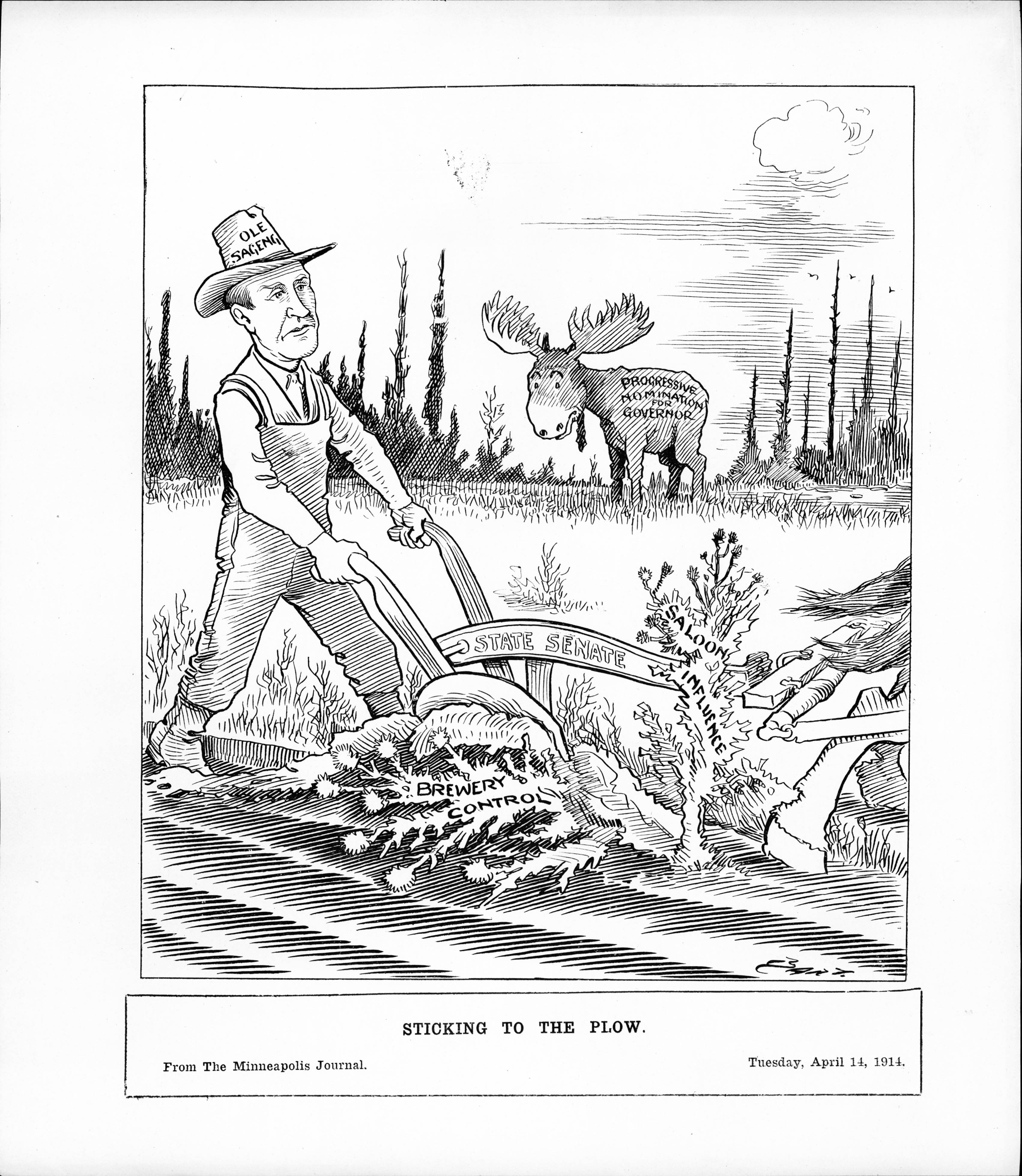
1914 caricature (and parody of his 1908 publicity shot) Sageng declining the Progressive Party nomination for governor, preferring to remain in the State Senate

In 1950, Sageng defeated Colvin G. Butler in a nonpartisan election for a seat in the Minnesota Senate. Sageng won by a margin of 8,188 votes to Butler's 6,284 votes. Over the course of his life, fellow legislator Julius E. Haycraft would note that Sageng became far more conservative. He represented the 50th district. In the 1954 general election, Henry Nycklemoe, a member of the Minnesota Democratic–Farmer–Labor Party, defeated Sageng.
