= Godfrey G. Goodwin =

American politician

Godfrey Goodwin
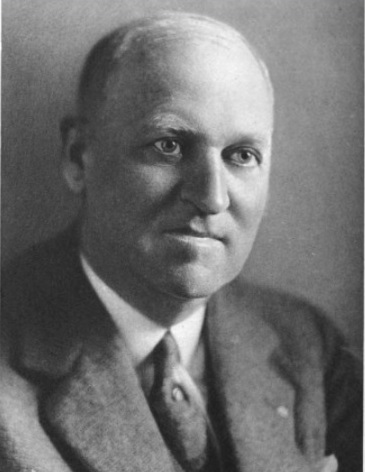
- Frontispiece of 1933's Godfrey G. Goodwin, Late a Representative

Member of the U.S. House of Representatives from Minnesota's 10th district
- In office March 4, 1925 – February 16, 1933
- Preceded by: Thomas D. Schall
- Succeeded by: District abolished

Personal details
- Born: Alfred Gustafson; January 11, 1873 St. Peter, Minnesota, U.S.
- Died: February 16, 1933 (aged 60) Washington, D.C., U.S.
- Resting place: Lakewood Cemetery
- Party: Republican
- Spouse: Geneva Edwina Josephina Gouldberg
- Education: University of Minnesota Law School
- Profession: Attorney

Godfrey Gummer Goodwin (January 11, 1873 – February 16, 1933) was a U.S. representative from Minnesota.

== Early life ==
Goodwin was born Alfred Gustafson near St. Peter, Minnesota, to a single mother, Cecilia Carlson (née Sissa Carlsdotter), a native of Sweden. They moved to St. Paul, Minnesota, in 1882, where he took the name Godfrey Gummer Goodwin. He attended public schools and graduated from the University of Minnesota Law School at Minneapolis in 1896. He was admitted to the bar in 1896 and commenced practice in Cambridge, Minnesota.

Goodwin married Geneva Edwina Josephina Gouldberg on June 5, 1905. He served as president of the Board of Education in Cambridge from 1914 to 1917.

== Political career ==
Goodwin was prosecuting attorney of Isanti County from 1898 to 1907. He was elected to the position again in November 1913, and served until February 15, 1925, when he resigned following his election to Congress.

Goodwin was elected as a Republican to the U.S. House of Representatives, representing Minnesota's 10th congressional district and serving from March 4, 1925, until his death in 1933. After his congressional district was eliminated, he failed to receive nomination to the at-large Minnesota delegation in 1932. He plunged to his death from a window of the Hotel Driscoll in Washington, D.C., on February 16, 1933, only two weeks before the end of his final term. It is not known whether Goodwin intended to commit suicide or if the fall was an accident. He is interred in Lakewood Cemetery in Minneapolis.

== See also ==
- List of members of the United States Congress who died in office (1900–1949)

U.S. House of Representatives
Preceded by Thomas D. Schall	U.S. Representative from Minnesota's 10th congressional district 1925 – 1933	Succeeded by district abolished
