= John J. Farrell (Minnesota politician) =

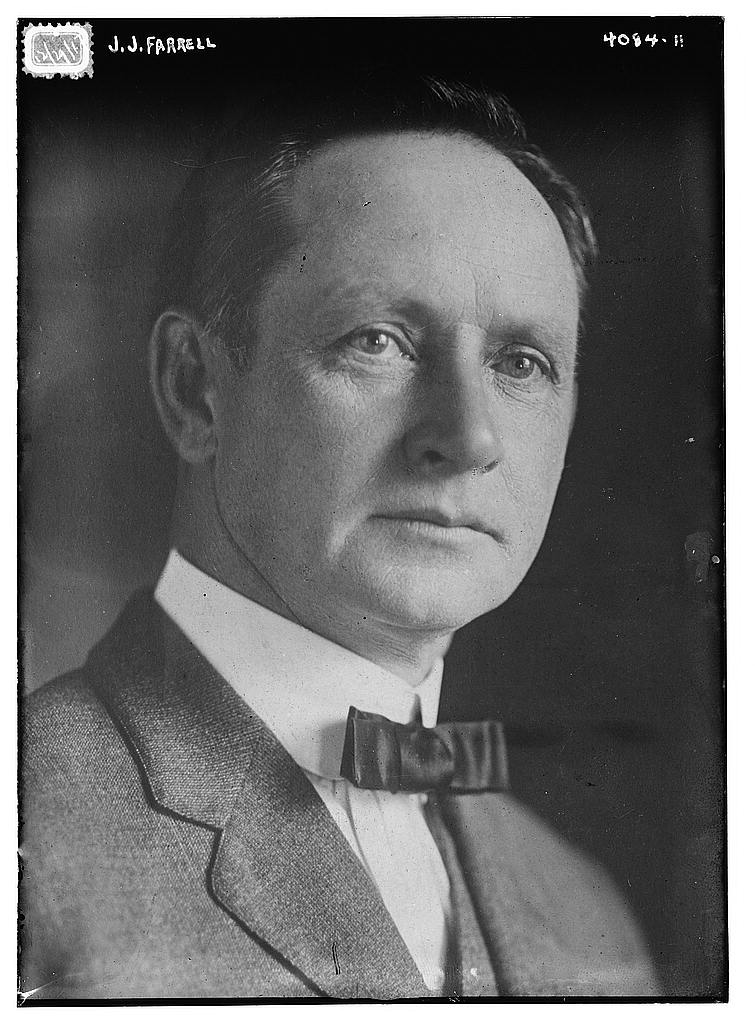
Farrell in 1917

John J. Farrell (1872 – July 22, 1946) was the Dairy and Food Commissioner of Minnesota in 1917 and president of the National Creamery Buttermakers' Association. By 1921 he was the secretary of National Dairy Products. He was the unsuccessful Democratic candidate in the United States Senate elections of 1924 for senator from Minnesota. He was the Minnesota Democratic state chair in 1931.

== Biography ==
He was born in 1872 in Ohio to Daniel Farrell and Mary Guyton, both Irish immigrant parents. They migrated to Minnesota in 1886. He married in August 1901 Mabel Sanborn of Faribault, Minnesota, a daughter of W. N. Sanborn.

By 1917 he was the Dairy and Food Commissioner of Minnesota and president of the National Creamery Buttermakers' Association.

By 1921 he was the secretary of National Dairy Products Committee. In 1924, he was the unsuccessful Democratic candidate for U.S. Senator from Minnesota.

He died on July 22, 1946, in South Harbor Township, Mille Lacs County, Minnesota.

== Footnotes ==
Party political offices
Preceded by James A. Carley	Democratic nominee for U.S. Senator from Minnesota (Class 2); 1924	Succeeded by Einar Hoidale
