= Magnus Johnson =

American politician (1871–1936)

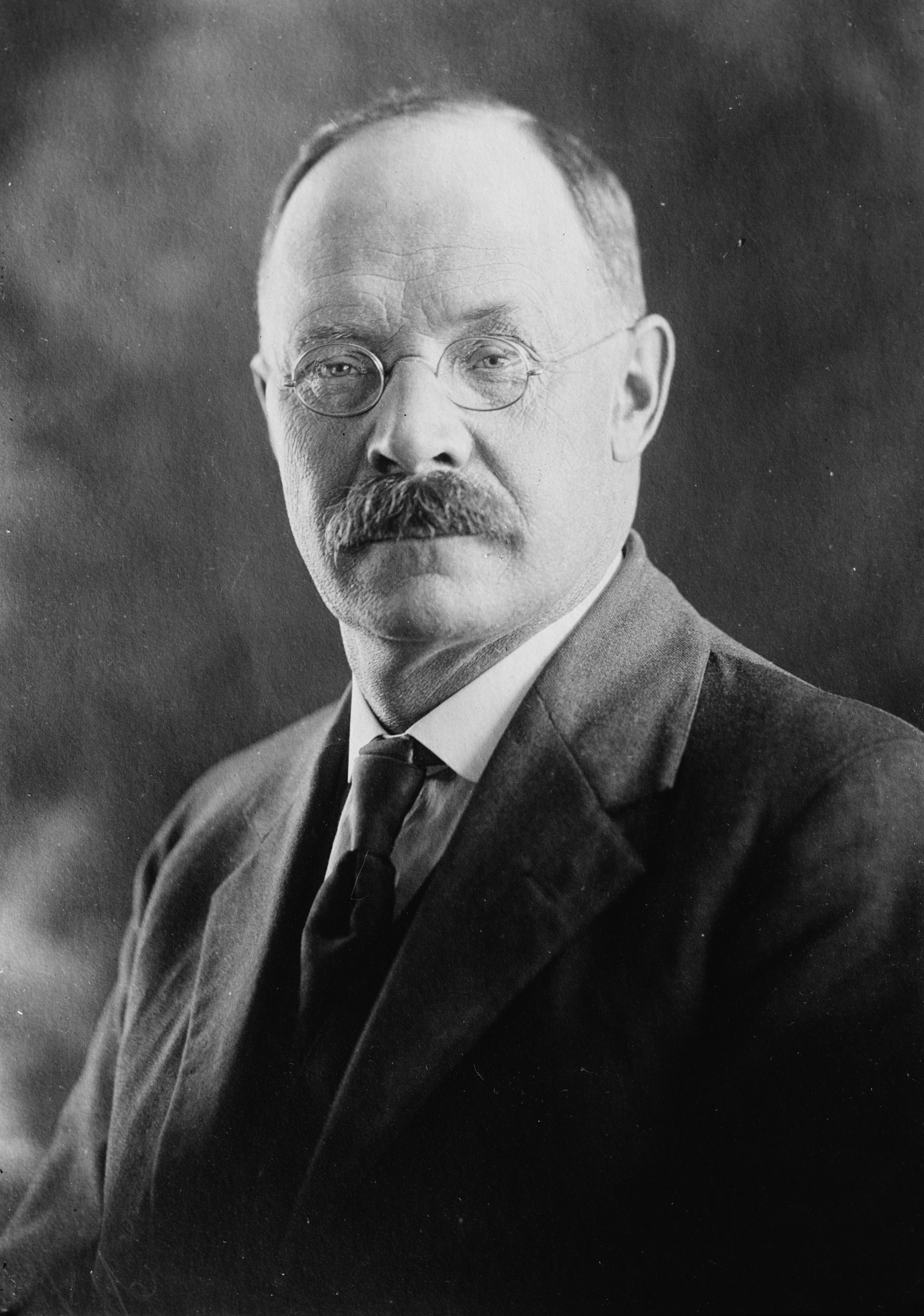
- Johnson c. 1923–1925

United States Senator from Minnesota
- In office July 16, 1923 – March 3, 1925
- Preceded by: Knute Nelson
- Succeeded by: Thomas D. Schall

Member of the U.S. House of Representatives from Minnesota's at-large district
- In office March 4, 1933 – January 3, 1935
- Preceded by: District re-established
- Succeeded by: District dissolved

Member of the Minnesota Senate from the 26th district
- In office January 6, 1919 – December 31, 1922
- Preceded by: Edward P. Peterson
- Succeeded by: Edward P. Peterson

Member of the Minnesota House of Representatives from the Meeker County district
- In office January 4, 1915 – January 5, 1919
- Preceded by: L. O. Westman
- Succeeded by: John M. Nelson

Personal details
- Born: September 19, 1871 Karlstad, Sweden
- Died: September 13, 1936 (aged 64) Litchfield, Minnesota, U.S.
- Party: Farmer–Labor
- Spouse(s): Matilda Boreen (m. 1895); Harriet Dorman (m. 1900)
- Children: 6

Magnus Johnson (September 19, 1871 – September 13, 1936) was an American politician. He served in the United States Senate and United States House of Representatives from Minnesota as a member of the Farmer–Labor Party. Johnson is the only Swedish-born person to serve in the U.S. Senate.

== Biography ==
Magnus Johnson was born in Ed Parish, near Karlstad, Sweden, on September 19, 1871. His family moved to La Crosse, Wisconsin in 1891, then to Meeker County, Minnesota, in 1893.

Johnson worked as a millhand and lumberjack, became a farmer, and by 1913 was the leader of the Minnesota branch of the American Society of Equity and Vice President of the Equity-owned Equity Co-operative Grain Exchange and Farmers' Terminal Packing Co.

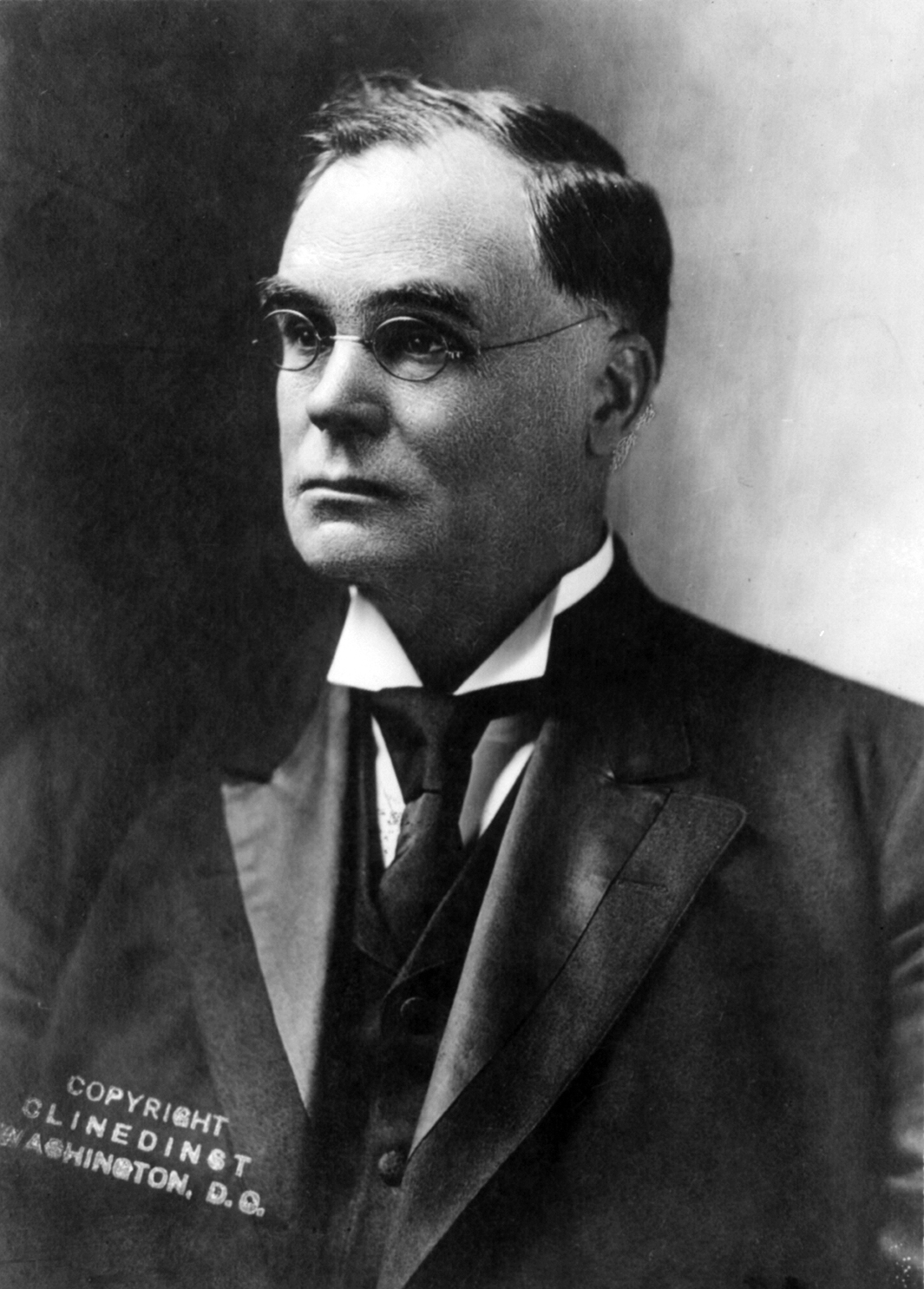
Portrait by Clinedinst c. 1909

Johnson served in both the Minnesota House of Representatives and the Minnesota Senate before being elected to the U.S. Senate on the Farmer-Labor ticket, to fill the seat opened because of the death of Knute Nelson. Johnson served in the Senate from July 16, 1923, to March 3, 1925, in the 68th congress. He lost his bid for reelection in 1924. He was elected to the U.S. House of Representatives and served March 4, 1933, to January 3, 1935, in the 73rd congress, winning one of the general ticket seats. Subsequently, he resumed agricultural pursuits and served as state supervisor of public stockyards 1934–1936. He was an unsuccessful candidate for the Farmer-Labor nomination for Governor of Minnesota in 1936.

Johnson died in Litchfield, where he had gone for medical treatment, on September 13, 1936, and his interment is in Dassel Community Cemetery in Dassel, Minnesota.

A son of his, Francis Austin Johnson (1904–1989) is the creator of the World's Biggest Ball of Twine; the twine ball rests under an enclosed pagoda in Darwin Township, Minnesota. He is interred in the same cemetery, near his father.

== See also ==
- List of United States senators born outside the United States

Party political offices
Vacant Title last held by David H. Evans	Farmer–Labor nominee for Governor of Minnesota; 1922	Succeeded by Floyd B. Olson
First	Farmer–Labor nominee for U.S. Senator from Minnesota (Class 2); 1923, 1924	Succeeded by Ernest Lundeen
Preceded by Floyd B. Olson	Farmer–Labor nominee for Governor of Minnesota; 1926	Succeeded by Ernest Lundeen
U.S. Senate
Preceded by Knute Nelson	U.S. senator (Class 2) from Minnesota; 1923–1925; Served alongside: Henrik Shipstead	Succeeded by Thomas D. Schall
U.S. House of Representatives
Preceded by General ticket Adopted	U.S. Representative from Minnesota; General ticket Seat Five; 1933–1935	Succeeded by General ticket Abolished
