= Minnesota's 10th congressional district =

1915–1933 US congressional district

- Obsolete district
- Created: 1915
- Eliminated: 1930
- Years active: 1915-1933

Minnesota's 10th congressional district is an obsolete congressional district which existed from 1915 to 1933. It was created from the results of the 1910 census and generally consisted of the current 3rd and 6th districts and the southern portion of the 8th district. It was abolished following the 1930 census.

It was represented by only two people, both Republicans: Thomas D. Schall and Godfrey G. Goodwin.

== List of members representing the district ==
Member (Residency)	Party	Years	Cong ress	Electoral history	District location
District created March 4, 1915
Thomas D. Schall (Excelsior)	Progressive	March 4, 1915 – March 3, 1919	64th 65th 66th 67th 68th	Elected in 1914. Re-elected in 1916. Re-elected in 1918. Re-elected in 1920. Re-elected in 1922. Retired to run for U.S. senator.	1915–1933; Anoka, Chisago, Isanti, Kanabec, Mille Lacs, Pine, and Wright; parts of Hennepin
Thomas D. Schall (Excelsior)	Republican	March 4, 1919 – March 3, 1925	64th 65th 66th 67th 68th	Elected in 1914. Re-elected in 1916. Re-elected in 1918. Re-elected in 1920. Re-elected in 1922. Retired to run for U.S. senator.	1915–1933; Anoka, Chisago, Isanti, Kanabec, Mille Lacs, Pine, and Wright; parts of Hennepin
Godfrey G. Goodwin (Cambridge)	Republican	March 4, 1925 – February 16, 1933	69th 70th 71st 72nd	Elected in 1924. Re-elected in 1926. Re-elected in 1928. Re-elected in 1930. Redistricted to the at-large district but lost renomination and died.	1915–1933; Anoka, Chisago, Isanti, Kanabec, Mille Lacs, Pine, and Wright; parts of Hennepin
Vacant		February 16, 1933 – March 3, 1933	72nd		1915–1933; Anoka, Chisago, Isanti, Kanabec, Mille Lacs, Pine, and Wright; parts of Hennepin
District eliminated March 4, 1933

== Election results ==
=== 1914 ===
1914 Minnesota's 10th congressional district election
Party	Candidate	Votes	%	±%
Progressive	Thomas D. Schall	12,786	39.11%	N/A
Republican	Lowell E. Jepson	11,383	34.82%	N/A
Democratic	Harry S. Swenson	8,522	26.07%	N/A
Total votes		32,691	100.00%	
Progressive win (new seat)				

=== 1916 ===
1916 Minnesota's 10th congressional district election
Party	Candidate	Votes	%	±%
Progressive	Thomas D. Schall (incumbent)	19,696	44.97%	+5.86
Republican	Lowell E. Jepson	13,170	30.07%	–4.75
Democratic	Neil Cronin	7,148	16.32%	–9.75
Socialist	John G. Soltis	3,782	8.64%	N/A
Total votes		43,796	100.00%	
Progressive hold				

=== 1918 ===
1918 Minnesota's 10th congressional district election
Party	Candidate	Votes	%	±%
Republican	Thomas D. Schall (incumbent)	25,866	71.06%	+40.99
Democratic	Henry A. Finlayson	10,534	28.94%	+12.62
Total votes		36,400	100.00%	
Republican gain from Progressive				

=== 1920 ===
1920 Minnesota's 10th congressional district election
Party	Candidate	Votes	%	±%
Republican	Thomas D. Schall (incumbent)	54,971	68.31%	–2.75
Farmer–Labor	John G. Soltis	18,590	23.10%	N/A
Democratic	Henry A. Finlayson	6,917	8.60%	–20.34
Total votes		80,478	100.00%	
Republican hold				

=== 1922 ===
1922 Minnesota's 10th congressional district election
Party	Candidate	Votes	%	±%
Republican	Thomas D. Schall (incumbent)	53,424	80.62%	+12.31
Progressive	Henry B. Rutledge	12,843	19.38%	N/A
Total votes		66,267	100.00%	
Republican hold				

=== 1924 ===
1924 Minnesota's 10th congressional district election
Party	Candidate	Votes	%	±%
Republican	Godfrey G. Goodwin	47,749	53.82%	–26.80
Farmer–Labor	George D. Brewer	36,490	41.13%	N/A
Democratic	Frank Hicks	4,485	5.06%	N/A
Total votes		88,724	100.00%	
Republican hold				

=== 1926 ===
1926 Minnesota's 10th congressional district election
Party	Candidate	Votes	%	±%
Republican	Godfrey G. Goodwin (incumbent)	36,897	59.07%	+5.25
Farmer–Labor	Ernest Lundeen	21,552	34.50%	–6.63
Democratic	Henry A. Finlayson	4,013	6.43%	+1.37
Total votes		62,462	100.00%	
Republican hold				

=== 1928 ===
1928 Minnesota's 10th congressional district election
Party	Candidate	Votes	%	±%
Republican	Godfrey G. Goodwin (incumbent)	60,100	56.39%	–2.68
Farmer–Labor	C. R. Hedlund	23,774	22.31%	–12.19
Democratic	Ernest W. Erickson	22,702	21.30%	+14.87
Total votes		106,576	100.00%	
Republican hold				

=== 1930 ===
1930 Minnesota's 10th congressional district election
Party	Candidate	Votes	%	±%
Republican	Godfrey G. Goodwin (incumbent)	38,391	49.53%	–6.86
Farmer–Labor	Erling Swenson	37,182	47.97%	+25.66
Communist	David I. Moses	1,931	2.49%	N/A
Total votes		77,504	100.00%	
Republican hold				
