= Colvin G. Butler =

American farmer and politician (1880–1961)

Colvin Garfield Butler (July 17, 1880 – April 15, 1961) was an American farmer, Presbyterian clergyman, and politician.

Butler was born in Perham, Otter Tail County, Minnesota. He went to the Perham elementary schools and graduated from the Kennedy Secondary School (formerly the Fergus Falls High School) in Fergus Falls, Minnesota. He went to the Park Region Luther College, Hamline University, Presbyterian Theological Seminary, in Omaha, Nebraska, and Buena Vista University in Sioux City, Iowa. Butler lived in Fergus Falls, Minnesota with his wife and family. He served in the Minnesota House of Representatives in 1939 and 1940 and in the Minnesota Senate from 1943 to 1950. Butler died at his home in Fergus Falls, Minnesota.
