= Thomas D. Schall =

American politician (1878–1935)

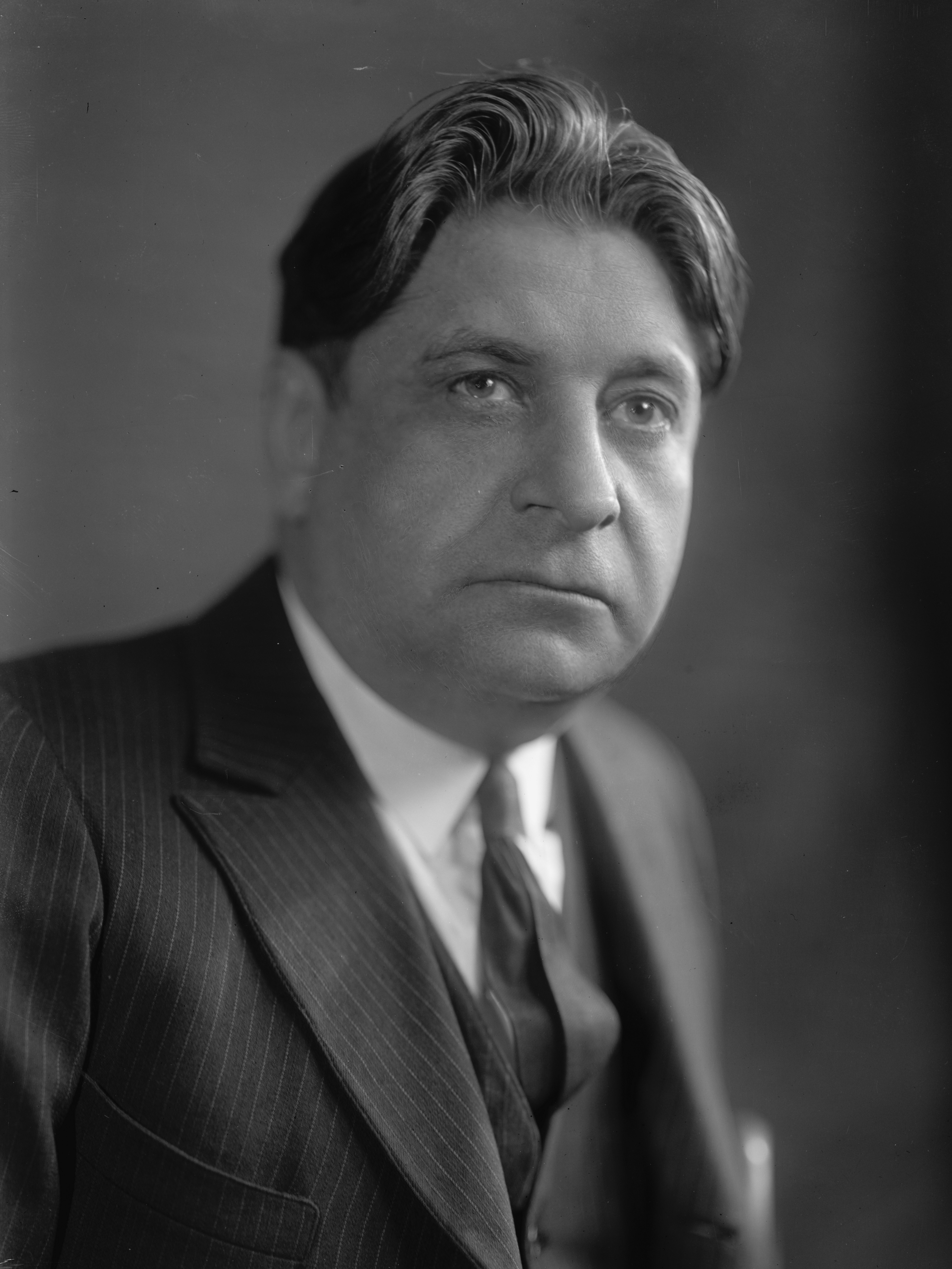
- Schall c. 1925–1935

United States Senator from Minnesota
- In office March 4, 1925 – December 22, 1935
- Preceded by: Magnus Johnson
- Succeeded by: Elmer Austin Benson

Member of the U.S. House of Representatives from Minnesota's 10th district
- In office March 4, 1915 – March 3, 1925
- Preceded by: District Created
- Succeeded by: Godfrey G. Goodwin

Personal details
- Born: June 4, 1878 Reed City, Michigan, U.S.
- Died: December 22, 1935 (aged 57) Washington, D.C., U.S.
- Resting place: Lakewood Cemetery
- Party: Republican
- Education: University of Minnesota; William Mitchell College of Law

Thomas David Schall (June 4, 1878 – December 22, 1935) was an American lawyer and politician. He served in both the United States House of Representatives and the United States Senate from Minnesota. He was initially elected and then reelected as a Progressive but later joined the Republican Party.

Schall was born in Reed City, Michigan, and moved with his family to Campbell, Minnesota, in 1884. He initially attended Hamline University, but graduated from the University of Minnesota in 1902, followed by William Mitchell College of Law (then the St. Paul College of Law) in 1904. Three years later, he was blinded by an electrical shock from a cigar lighter.

Schall was elected to the U.S. House of Representatives in 1914, representing Minnesota's 10th congressional district. He was reelected four times thereafter, serving from March 4, 1915, to March 3, 1925. As he was legally blind, he was granted, by House vote, a full-time page to assist him with his work.

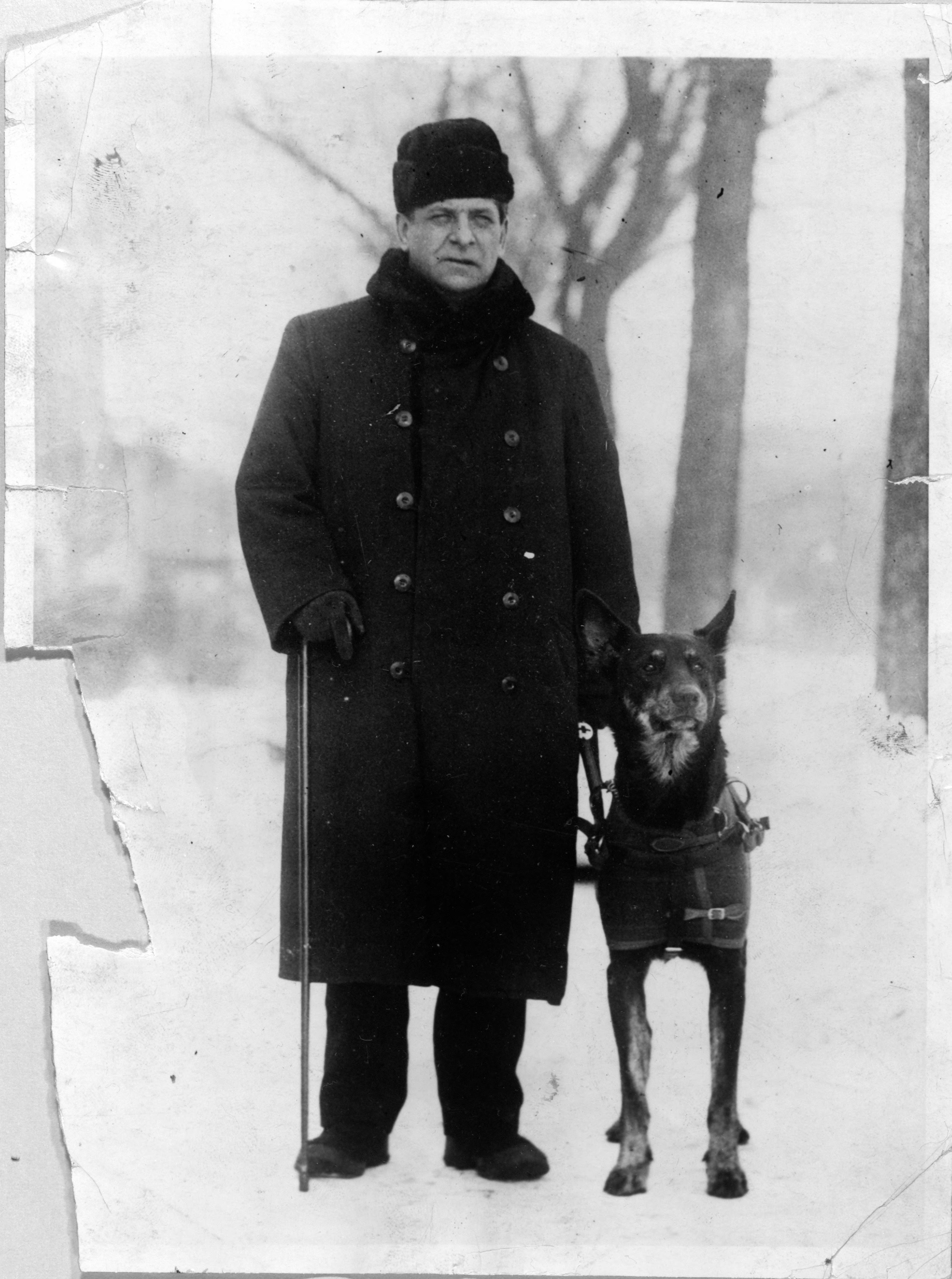
Senator Schall with his guide dog, ca. 1930

After losing the Republican primary for a special election to the U.S. Senate in 1923, Schall was elected to the Senate in 1924, defeating incumbent Senator Magnus Johnson with 46% of the vote. He served from March 4, 1925, until his death in 1935. Johnson challenged Schall's electoral victory in 1924, leading Schall to label him "a marionette who kicked and waved his hands and opened his mouth according to the tension of the string." He had a tough reelection campaign in 1930, facing strong candidates from both the Democratic and Farmer-Labor parties, and eventually won with 37% of the vote with the support of the NAACP owing to his support of the Dyer Anti-Lynching Bill.

Long noted as a vitriolic and personal campaigner, Schall emerged as a leading opponent of the New Deal, comparing Franklin D. Roosevelt to Satan and claiming his reform program was communistic in nature. Going further, Schall accused Eleanor Roosevelt of corruption and likened President Roosevelt to Mussolini and Hitler, while at the same time accusing him of plotting "the destruction of all private industry."

Schall was struck by a hit and run driver while walking across the Washington-Baltimore Boulevard, now known as Bladensburg Road, in Cottage City, Maryland, on December 19, 1935. He died in Washington three days later, becoming one of the few members of Congress to die in a road crash while in office. He is buried in Lakewood Cemetery in Minneapolis.

== See also ==
- List of members of the United States Congress who died in office (1900–1949)

Party political offices
Preceded by J. A. O. Preus	Republican nominee for U.S. Senator from Minnesota (Class 2); 1924, 1930	Succeeded by Guy V. Howard
U.S. Senate
Preceded by Magnus Johnson	U.S. senator (Class 2) from Minnesota; 1925–1935; Served alongside: Henrik Shipstead	Succeeded by Elmer Austin Benson
U.S. House of Representatives
Preceded by District Created	U.S. Representative from Minnesota's 10th congressional district 1915–1925	Succeeded by Godfrey G. Goodwin
