= 1923 United States Senate special election in Minnesota =

- July 16, 1923
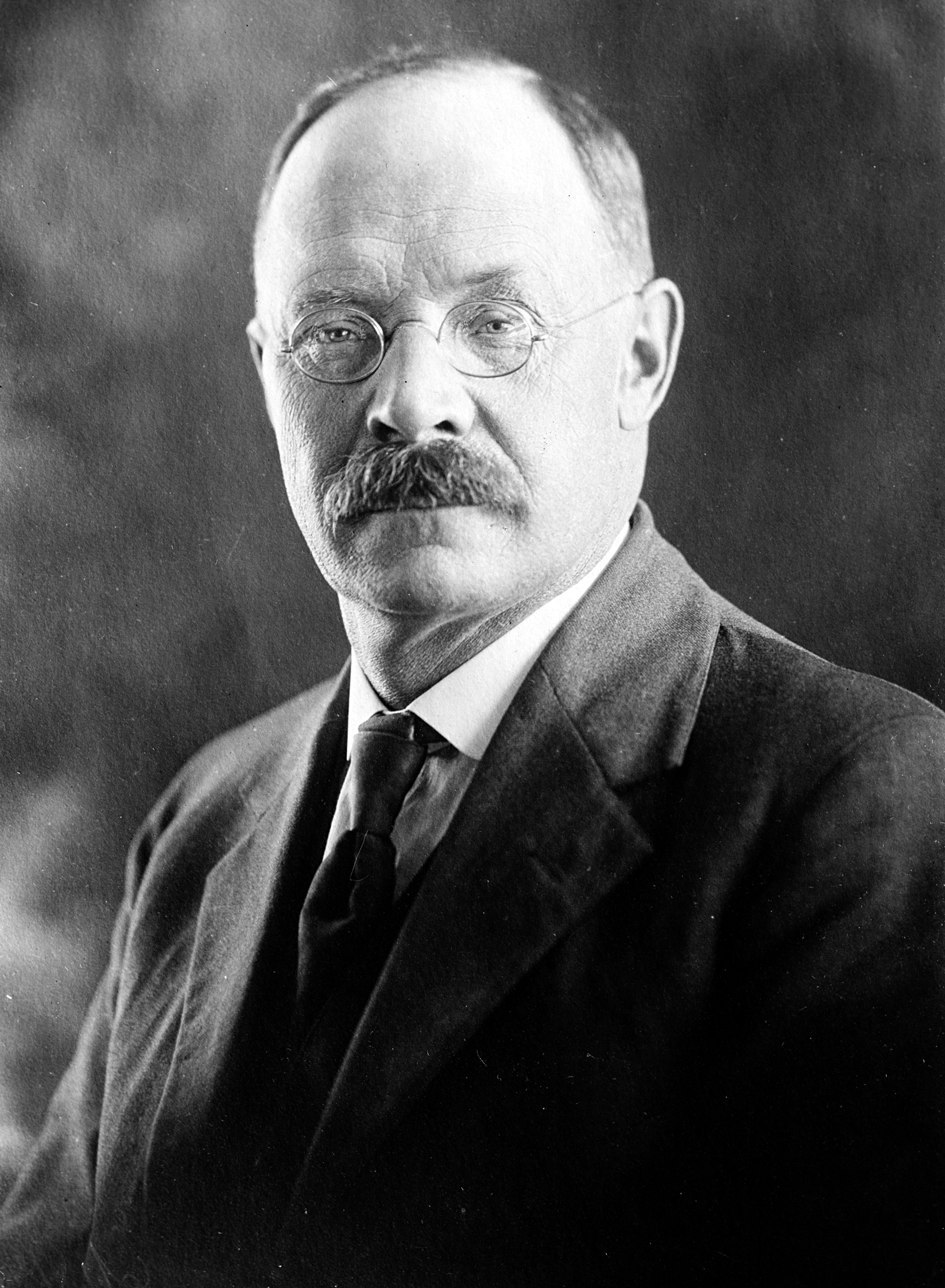

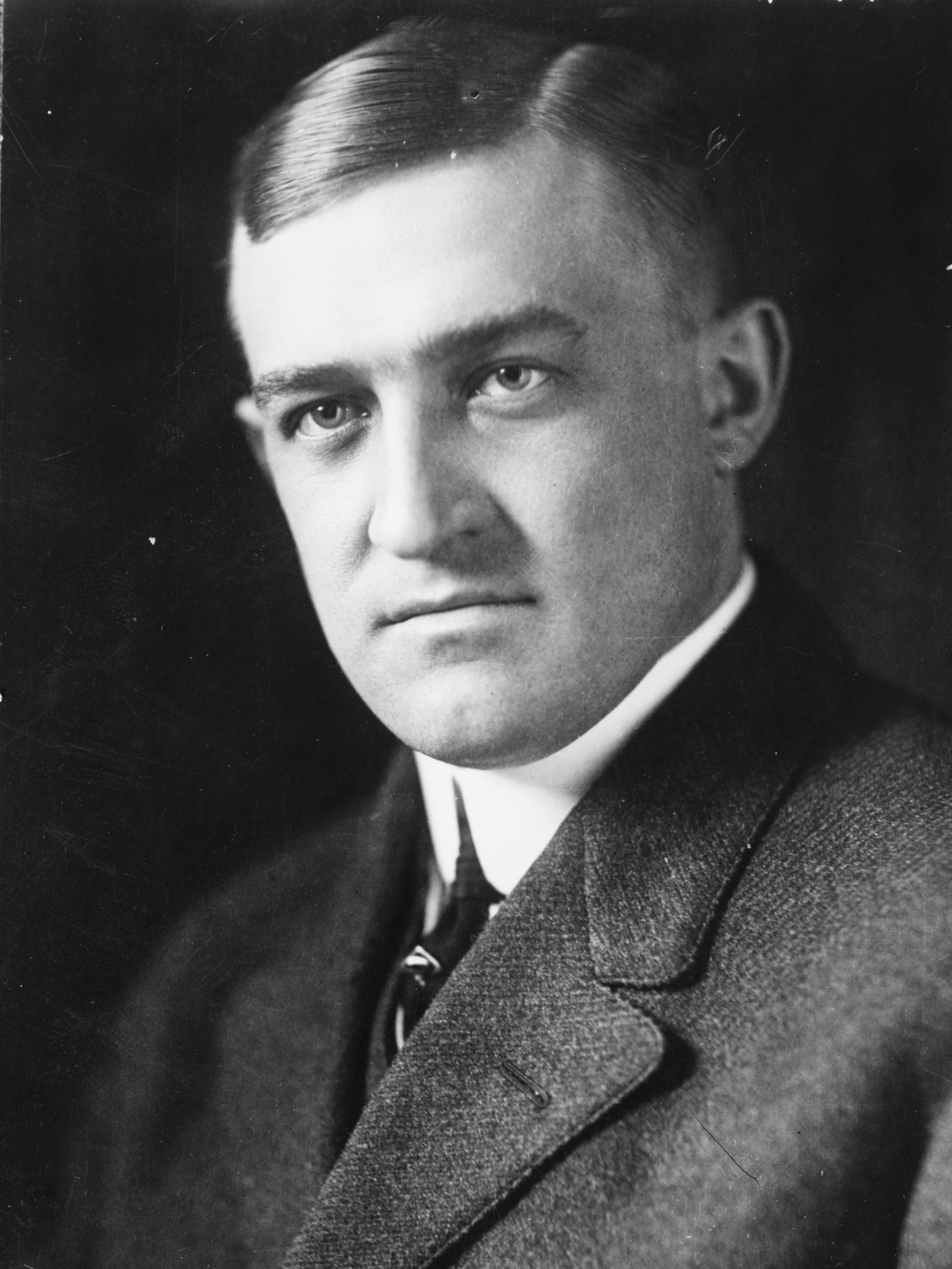
Nominee	Magnus Johnson	J. A. O. Preus
Party	Farmer–Labor	Republican
Popular vote	290,165	195,319
Percentage	57.48%	38.69%
County results
Johnson
30–40%
40–50%
50–60%
60–70%
70–80%
80–90%
Preus
40–50%
50–60%
60–70%
U.S. senator before election
Knute Nelson
Republican
Elected U.S. Senator
Magnus Johnson
Farmer–Labor

The 1923 United States Senate special election in Minnesota took place on July 16, 1923. The election was held to fill, for the remainder of the unexpired term, the seat in the United States Senate left vacant by Republican U.S. Senator Knute Nelson, who died in office on April 28, 1923. State Senator Magnus Johnson of the Farmer–Labor Party of Minnesota defeated Governor J. A. O. Preus of the Republican Party of Minnesota, and State Senator James A. Carley of the Minnesota Democratic Party, which, together with Henrik Shipstead's victory in 1922, brought both of Minnesota's seats in the United States Senate into the hands of the Farmer–Labor Party for the first time in history.

Johnson's victory marked the first time, since Morton S. Wilkinson took office in 1859, that neither of Minnesota's seats in the United States Senate were held by a Republican. It also marked the first time, since Wilkinson's assumption of the office, that the person holding Minnesota's Class 2 U.S. Senate seat was not a Republican, and Johnson became just the second non-Republican to ever hold that seat (the first being the Democrat James Shields, whose term of office ended when Wilkinson's began).

== Republican primary ==
=== Candidates ===
==== Nominated ====
- J.A.O. Preus, Governor (1921–1925), former state Insurance Commissioner (1911–1915), former state Auditor (1915–1921), Minneapolis attorney

==== Eliminated in Primary ====
- Sydney Anderson, Lanesboro attorney, U.S. Representative from the 1st CD (1911–1925)
- Joseph A. A. Burnquist, former state representative from the 33rd HD (1909–1913), former lieutenant governor (1913–1915), former governor (1915–1921)
- Oscar Hallam, St. Paul attorney, former Second Judicial District judge, former associate justice of the Supreme Court (1913–1923)
- Ernest Lundeen, former state representative from the 42nd HD (1911–1915), former U.S. Representative from the 5th CD (1917–1919), candidate for U.S. Senate in 1922, Minneapolis attorney
- John J. Martin, Minneapolis attorney
- Victor L. Power, attorney and mayor of Hibbing (1913–1922, 1923–1924)
- Thomas D. Schall, Excelsior attorney, Progressive-turned-Republican U.S. Representative from the 10th CD (1915–1925)
- Halvor Steenerson, former Polk County prosecuting attorney (1881–1883), former city attorney of Crookson, former state Senator from the 45th SD (1883–1887), former U.S. Representative from the 9th CD (1903–1923), resident of Crookson

=== Results ===
Republican Party primary results
Republican	J.A.O. Preus	57,919	33.64
Republican	Oscar Hallam	32,482	18.87
Republican	Thomas D. Schall	29,713	17.26
Republican	Sydney Anderson	17,526	10.18
Republican	Victor L. Power	15,384	8.94
Republican	Joseph A.A. Burnquist	8,381	4.87
Republican	Ernest Lundeen	5,851	3.40
Republican	Halvor Steenerson	4,032	2.34
Republican	John J. Martin	861	0.50
Total Votes		172,149	100.0

== Farmer-Labor Primary ==
=== Candidates ===
==== Nominated ====
- Magnus Johnson, state senator from the 26th SD (1919–1923), former state Representative from the 26th House District (1915–1919)

==== Eliminated in Primary ====
- L.A. Fritsche, Mayor of New Ulm, physician
- Charles August Lindbergh, former prosecuting attorney of Morrison County (1891–1893), former Republican U.S. Representative (CD 06, 1907–1917), candidate for U.S. Senate in 1916, candidate for governor in 1918, resident of Little Falls

=== Results ===
Farmer-Labor primary results
Farmer-Labor	Magnus Johnson	57,570	48.88
Farmer-Labor	L.A. Fritsche	38,393	32.60
Farmer-Labor	Charles A. Lindbergh	21,811	18.52
Total Votes		117,774	100.0

== Democratic primary ==
=== Candidates ===
==== Nominated ====
- James A. Carley, state senator from the 3rd SD (1915-), former Democratic state Representative from the 3rd HD (1909–1911), Plainview attorney

==== Eliminated in Primary ====
- Francis C. Cary, Lecturer and former attorney from Minneapolis

=== Results ===
Democratic primary results
Democratic	James A. Carley	7,555	74.19
Democratic	Francis C. Cary	2,628	25.81
Total Votes		10,183	100.0

== Special election ==
=== Republican ===
- J.A.O. Preus, Governor (1921–1925), former state Insurance Commissioner (1911–1915), former state Auditor (1915–1921), Minneapolis attorney

=== Farmer-Labor ===
- Magnus Johnson, state senator from the 26th SD (1919–1923), former state Representative from the 26th House District (1915–1919)

=== Democratic ===
- James A. Carley, state senator from the 3rd SD (1915-), former Democratic state Representative from the 3rd HD (1909–1911), Plainview attorney

=== Results ===
Special election results
Party	Candidate	Votes	%
Farmer–Labor	Magnus Johnson	290,165	57.48%
Republican	J. A. O. Preus	195,319	38.69%
Democratic	James A. Carley	19,311	3.83%
Total votes		504,795	100.00%
Majority		94,846	18.79%
Farmer–Labor gain from Republican			

== See also ==
- 1923 United States Senate elections
