= Ohio's at-large congressional district =

Coordinates: 40°N 82°W

- Obsolete district
- Created: 1800; 1910; 1930; 1960
- Eliminated: 1810; 1915; 1950; 1967
- Years active: 1803-1813; 1913-1915; 1933-1953; 1963-1967

Ohio's at-large congressional district existed from 1803 to 1813, from 1913 to 1915, from 1933 to 1953 and from 1963 until 1967, when it was banned by the Voting Rights Act of 1965.

From statehood in 1803 until the 1813 redistricting following the 1810 census, Ohio had only one member of the United States House of Representatives: Jeremiah Morrow.

== List of members representing the district ==
Cong ress	Years	Member	Party	Electoral history
8th 9th 10th 11th 12th	October 17, 1803 – March 3, 1813	Jeremiah Morrow (Montgomery)	Democratic-Republican	Elected in 1803. Re-elected in 1804. Re-elected in 1806. Re-elected in 1808. Re-elected in 1810. Retired to run for U.S. Senator.

After the 1810 census, the at-large seat was eliminated. It was reinstated after the 1910 census.

Cong ress	Years	Member	Party	Electoral history
63rd	March 4, 1913 – March 3, 1915	Robert Crosser (Cleveland)	Democratic	Elected in 1912. Redistricted to the 21st district.

From the 1930 census to the 1940 census, there were two seats elected at-large, on a general ticket.

Cong ress	Years	Seat A			Seat B		
Cong ress	Years	Member	Party	Electoral history	Member	Party	Electoral history
73rd	March 4, 1933 – March 3, 1935	Charles V. Truax (Bucyrus)	Democratic	Elected in 1932	Stephen M. Young (Cleveland)	Democratic	Elected in 1932.
74th	March 4, 1935 – August 9, 1935	Charles V. Truax (Bucyrus)	Democratic	Re-elected in 1934. Died.	Stephen M. Young (Cleveland)	Democratic	Re-elected in 1934. Retired to run for Governor of Ohio.
74th	August 9, 1935 – November 3, 1936	Vacant			Stephen M. Young (Cleveland)	Democratic	Re-elected in 1934. Retired to run for Governor of Ohio.
74th	November 3, 1936 – January 3, 1937	Daniel S. Earhart (Columbus)	Democratic	[data missing] Retired.	Stephen M. Young (Cleveland)	Democratic	Re-elected in 1934. Retired to run for Governor of Ohio.
75th	January 3, 1937 – January 3, 1939	John McSweeney (Wooster)	Democratic	Elected in 1936. Lost re-election.	Harold G. Mosier (Cleveland)	Democratic	Elected in 1936. Lost renomination.
76th	January 3, 1939 – January 3, 1941	George H. Bender (Cleveland Heights)	Republican	Elected in 1938	L. L. Marshall (Euclid)	Republican	Elected in 1938. Lost re-election.
77th	January 3, 1941 – January 3, 1943	George H. Bender (Cleveland Heights)	Republican	Re-elected in 1940	Stephen M. Young (Cleveland)	Democratic	Elected in 1940. Lost re-election.
78th	January 3, 1943 – January 3, 1945	George H. Bender (Cleveland Heights)	Republican	Re-elected in 1942	Seat two was eliminated after the 1940 census.		
79th	January 3, 1945 – January 3, 1947	George H. Bender (Cleveland Heights)	Republican	Re-elected in 1944.	Seat two was eliminated after the 1940 census.		
80th	January 3, 1947 – January 3, 1949	George H. Bender (Cleveland Heights)	Republican	Re-elected in 1946. Lost re-election.	Seat two was eliminated after the 1940 census.		
81st	January 3, 1949 – January 3, 1951	Stephen M. Young (Cleveland)	Democratic	Elected in 1948. Lost re-election.	Seat two was eliminated after the 1940 census.		
82nd	January 3, 1951 – January 3, 1953	George H. Bender (Chagrin Falls)	Republican	Elected in 1950. Redistricted to the 23rd district.	Seat two was eliminated after the 1940 census.		

In 1953, the seat was eliminated. It was restored in 1963.

Years	Cong ress	Member	Party	Electoral history
88th	January 3, 1963 – January 3, 1965	Robert Taft Jr. (Indian Hill)	Republican	Elected in 1962. Retired to run for U.S. Senator.
89th	January 3, 1965 – January 3, 1967	Robert E. Sweeney (Bay Village)	Democratic	Elected in 1964. Retired to run for Ohio Attorney General.

In 1967, the at-large district was eliminated, and Ohio's 24th congressional district was created to replace it.

== Elections ==
Between 1803 and 1813 Ohio had one representative. After the 1910 census Ohio's at large seat came back but was then eliminated in 1915. From 1932 to 1942 there were 2 at-large representatives but after the 1940 census there was only one until 1953. It was then again restored in 1963 but was eliminated in 1967.

== One seat (1803-1813) ==
=== 1803 ===
Results by county Morrow: 40–50% 50–60% 60–70% 70–80% 80–90% McMillan: 40–50% 50–60% Baldwin: 30–40% 40–50% 60–70% Langham: 40–50%

Democratic-Republican candidate Jeremiah Morrow won the general election held on June 21, 1803.

1803 United States House of Representatives election in Ohio
Party	Candidate	Votes	%	±%
Democratic-Republican	Jeremiah Morrow	3,701	48.18%	
Federalist	William McMillan	2,043	26.60%	
Democratic-Republican	Michael Baldwin	902	11.74%	
Democratic-Republican	Elias Langham	615	8.01%	
Democratic-Republican	William Goforth	313	4.07%	
Others		34	1.39%	
Total votes		7,681	100.0%	

=== 1804 ===
Democratic-Republican Jeremiah Morrow won the general election held on October 9, 1804.

1804 United States House of Representatives election in Ohio
Party	Candidate	Votes	%
Democratic-Republican	Jeremiah Morrow (incumbent)	4,101	70.20%
Federalist	Elias Langham	1,718	29.41%
Democratic-Republican	Rufus Putnam	23	0.39%
Total votes		5,842	100.0%
Democratic-Republican hold			

=== 1806 ===
Incumbent Jeremiah Morrow won the general election held on October 14, 1806 to a third term.

1806 United States House of Representatives election in Ohio
Party	Candidate	Votes	%
Democratic-Republican	Jeremiah Morrow (incumbent)	6,735	73.95%
Quids	James Pritchard	2,364	25.96%
Other candidates		9	0.10%
Total votes		9,108	100.0%
Democratic-Republican hold			

=== 1808 ===
Incumbent Jeremiah Morrow ran as a Quid and won the general election held on October 11, 1808.

1808 United States House of Representatives election in Ohio
Party	Candidate	Votes	%
Quids	Jeremiah Morrow (incumbent)	11,852	71.47%
Federalist	Philemon Beecher	4,724	28.49%
Other candidates		8	0.04%
Total votes		16,584	100.0%
Quids gain from Democratic-Republican			

=== 1810 ===
Incumbent Jeremiah Morrow won the general election held on October 9, 1810 as a Democratic-Republican. This would be the last election where Ohio had only 1 seat due to population growth.

1810 United States House of Representatives election in Ohio
Party	Candidate	Votes	%
Democratic-Republican	Jeremiah Morrow (incumbent)	6,859	95.77%
Democratic-Republican	Samuel Huntington	269	3.76%
Other candidates		34	0.47%
Total votes		7,162	100.0%
Democratic-Republican gain from Quids			

== 1910 census ==
=== 1912 ===
Democratic candidate Robert Crosser won the general election held on November 5, 1912.

1912 Ohio's at-large congressional district election
Party	Candidate	Votes	%
Democratic	Robert Crosser	423,311	41.64%
Republican	Lawrence Langdon	297,355	29.25%
Progressive	Randolph W. Walton	192,799	18.97%
Socialist	Harry D. Thomas	91,201	8.97%
Prohibition	Frank Stanton	11,862	1.17%
Total votes		1,016,528	100.0%

== Two seats (1933-1943) ==
Ohio would have two at-large districts until 1943 when it would only elect one representative at-large.

=== 1932 ===
The two Democrats, Charles V. Truax and Stephen M. Young would get first and second place. Republican candidate, George Bender would later win in 1938.

1932 Ohio's at-large congressional district election
Party	Candidate	Votes	%
Democratic	Charles V. Truax	1,206,631	25.81%
Democratic	Stephen M. Young	1,200,946	25.69%
Republican	George H. Bender	1,109,562	23.73%
Republican	L. T. Palmer	1,102,567	23.58%
Prohibition	Edward R. Stafford	24,625	0.53%
Prohibition	Alfred H. Stratton	17,844	0.38%
Communist	John Rehms	7,050	0.15%
Communist	William Hughey	6,010	0.13%
Total votes		4,675,235	100.0%

=== 1934 ===
Both Democrats, Charles V. Truax and Stephen M. Young would both win re-election to a second term.

1934 Ohio's at-large congressional district election
Party	Candidate	Votes	%
Democratic	Charles V. Truax (incumbent)	1,061,857	27.11%
Democratic	Stephen M. Young (incumbent)	1,050,089	26.81%
Republican	George H. Bender	905,233	23.11%
Republican	L. L. Marshall	871,432	22.25%
Communist	Ben Atkins	13,972	0.36%
Communist	John Marshall	13,808	0.35%
Total votes		3,916,391	100.0%

=== 1936 ===
Neither incumbent Democrat runs for re-election. Democrats hold on to both seats.

1936 Ohio's at-large congressional district election
Party	Candidate	Votes	%
Democratic	John McSweeney	1,553,059	28.75%
Democratic	Harold G. Mosier	1,493,152	27.64%
Republican	George H. Bender	1,226,147	22.70%
Republican	L. L. Marshall	1,121,370	20.76%
Communist	William C. Sandberg	8,947	0.17%
Total votes		5,402,675	100.0%

There was a special election for the remainder of Charles Truax's term due to his death on August 9, 1935. Daniel S. Earhart who won the election would serve until January 1937.

1936 Ohio's at-large congressional district special election
Party	Candidate	Votes	%
Democratic	Daniel S. Earhart	1,479,284	58.31%
Republican	Benson Ogier	1,057,473	41.69%
Total votes		2,536,757	100.0%

=== 1938 ===
Republicans flip both seats with George Bender and L. L. Marshall getting first and second place respectively.

1938 Ohio's at-large congressional district election
Party	Candidate	Votes	%
Republican	George H. Bender	1,177,982	27.00%
Republican	L. L. Marshall	1,101,193	25.24%
Democratic	Stephen M. Young (incumbent)	1,068,916	24.50%
Democratic	John McSweeney (incumbent)	1,015,041	23.26%
Total votes		2,536,757	100.0%

=== 1940 ===
George H. Bender wins re-election but L. L. Marshall loses to Stephen M. Young who got second place with 25.7% of the vote. The At-large district is split between one Democrat and one Republican.

1940 Ohio's at-large congressional district election
Party	Candidate	Votes	%
Republican	George H. Bender (incumbent)	1,519,559	26.31%
Democratic	Stephen M. Young	1,483,879	25.70%
Republican	L. L. Marshall (incumbent)	1,386,627	24.01%
Democratic	Francis W. Durbin	1,384,745	23.98%
Total votes		5,774,810	100.0%

== One Seat At-Large (1943-1953) ==
The 1940 United States census brings Ohio's At-Large districts down to one. Democrat Stephen M. Young ended up losing to Republican candidate George H. Bender by a wide margin.

=== 1942 ===
1942 Ohio's at-large congressional district election
Party	Candidate	Votes	%
Republican	George H. Bender (incumbent)	945,995	56.86%
Democratic	Stephen M. Young (incumbent)	717,692	43.14%
Total votes		1,663,687	100.0%

=== 1944 ===
George H. Bender wins re-election with 53.1% of the votes cast.

1944 Ohio's at-large congressional district election
Party	Candidate	Votes	%
Republican	George H. Bender (incumbent)	1,542,422	53.09%
Democratic	William Glass	1,362,843	46.91%
Total votes		2,905,265	100.0%

=== 1946 ===
George H. Bender wins re-election with 59.5% of the votes cast.

1946 Ohio's at-large congressional district election
Party	Candidate	Votes	%
Republican	George H. Bender (incumbent)	1,281,864	59.52%
Democratic	William M. Boyd	871,660	40.48%
Total votes		2,153,524	100.0%

=== 1948 ===
Former representative, Stephen M. Young defeats incumbent George H. Bender with 52 percent of the vote.

1948 Ohio's at-large congressional district election
Party	Candidate	Votes	%
Democratic	Stephen M. Young	1,455,972	52.03%
Republican	George H. Bender (incumbent)	1,342,388	47.97%
Total votes		2,798,360	100.0%

=== 1950 ===
George H. Bender wins a rematch with Stephen M. Young by a 7.81% margin.

1950 Ohio's at-large congressional district election
Party	Candidate	Votes	%
Republican	George H. Bender	1,447,154	53.91%
Democratic	Stephen M. Young (incumbent)	1,237,409	46.09%
Total votes		2,684,563	100.0%

== 1960 census seat (1963-1967) ==
The at-large seat would be abolished with the 1950 census but was brought back after the 1960 census. It would be abolished again and forever in 1967 being replaced with Ohio's 24th congressional district.

=== 1962 ===
Republican Party candidate, Robert Taft Jr. defeated Democrat Richard D. Kennedy by a large margin of 21 points.

1962 Ohio's at-large congressional district election
Party	Candidate	Votes	%
Republican	Robert Taft Jr.	1,786,018	60.53%
Democratic	Richard D. Kennedy	1,164,628	39.47%
Total votes		2,950,646	100.0%

=== 1964 ===
Incumbent, Robert Taft Jr. decided to run in the concurrent U.S. senate election instead of re-election to congress. Democratic Party nominee Robert Sweeney defeated Oliver P. Bolton who represented Ohio's 11th congressional district by around four percentage points.

1964 Ohio's at-large congressional district election
Party	Candidate	Votes	%
Democratic	Robert E. Sweeney	1,872,351	52.17%
Republican	Oliver P. Bolton	1,716,480	47.83%
Total votes		2,950,646	100.0%
