= 74th United States Congress =

1935–1937 U.S. Congress

←	73rd	75th	→
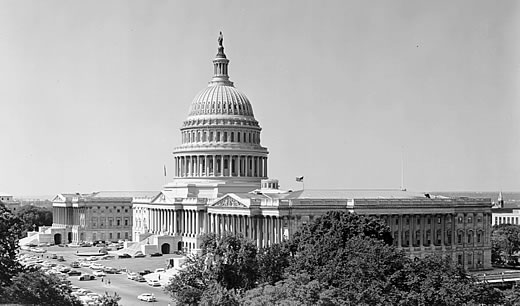
- United States Capitol (1956)

Overview
- Legislative body: United States Congress
- Jurisdiction: United States
- Term: January 3, 1935 – January 3, 1937

Senate
- Members: 96
- President: John N. Garner (D)
- President pro tempore: Key Pittman (D)
- Party control: Democratic

House of Representatives
- Members: 435 representatives 5 non-voting delegates
- Speaker: Jo Byrns (D) (until June 4, 1936); William B. Bankhead (D) (from June 4, 1936)
- Party control: Democratic

Sessions
- 1st: January 3, 1935 – August 26, 1935
- 2nd: January 3, 1936 – June 20, 1936

The 74th United States Congress was a meeting of the legislative branch of the United States federal government, composed of the United States Senate and the United States House of Representatives. It met in Washington, D.C., from January 3, 1935, to January 3, 1937, during the third and fourth years of Franklin D. Roosevelt's presidency. The apportionment of seats in the House of Representatives was based on the 1930 United States census.

The Democrats increased their majorities in both the House and Senate, resulting in a supermajority in both chambers, and along with President Franklin D. Roosevelt maintained an overall federal government trifecta.

== Major events ==
- April 14, 1935: Dust Bowl: The great dust storm hit eastern New Mexico, Colorado, and western Oklahoma
- May 6, 1935: Executive Order 7034 created the Works Progress Administration (WPA).
- May 27, 1935: Schechter Poultry Corp. v. United States: the U.S. Supreme Court declared the National Industrial Recovery Act unconstitutional
- June 12, 1935 – June 13, 1935: Senator Huey Long gave the second longest filibuster speech in Senate history up to that time, 15 hours and 30 minutes to retain a provision, opposed by President Franklin Roosevelt, requiring Senate confirmation for the National Recovery Administration's senior employees.
- July 1, 1935: Charles Watkins was appointed as the first officially recognized Parliamentarian of the United States Senate.
- September 10, 1935: Senator Huey Long of Louisiana died, as the result of being shot by an assassin on September 8.
- March 1, 1936: Construction of Hoover Dam was completed.
- March 2, 1936: Judge Halsted L. Ritter impeached by the U.S. House (H.Res. 422)
- April 17, 1936: Judge Halsted L. Ritter convicted by the U.S. Senate
- June 4, 1936: Speaker of the U.S. House of Representatives Jo Byrns died. William B. Bankhead was then elected later that day.
- November 3, 1936: General elections
  - President: Franklin D. Roosevelt (D) was reelected with 60.8% of the vote over Alf Landon (R).
  - Senate: Democrats gained 5 net seats during the election, and in combination with Democratic and Farmer–Labor interim appointments and the defection of George W. Norris from the Republican Party to become independent, the Republicans were reduced to 16 seats, the most lopsided Senate since Reconstruction.
  - House: Democrats gained twelve more net seats from the Republicans, bringing them above a three-fourths majority. This was the largest majority since Reconstruction. The last time a party won so decisively was in 1866.
- November 25, 1936: Abraham Lincoln Brigade sailed from New York City on its way to the Spanish Civil War

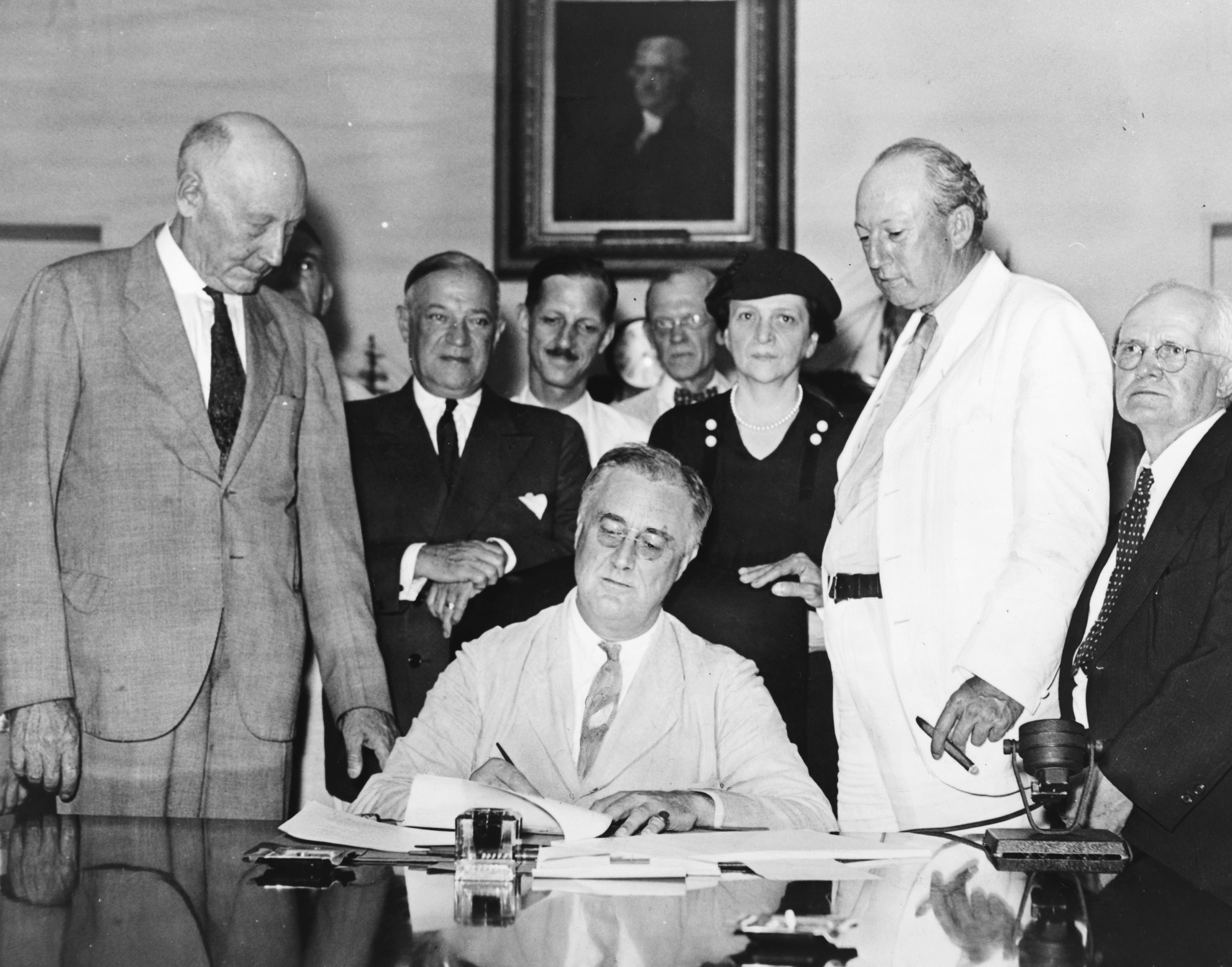
President Roosevelt signs the Social Security Act, at approximately 3:30pm ET on August 14, 1935. Standing with Roosevelt are Rep. Robert Doughton (D-NC); unknown person in shadow; Sen. Robert Wagner (D-NY); Rep. John Dingell Sr. (D-MI); unknown man in bowtie; Secretary of Labor, Frances Perkins; Sen. Pat Harrison (D-MS); and Rep. David Lewis (D-MD).

== Major legislation ==
- April 27, 1935: Soil Conservation and Domestic Allotment Act, Sess. 1, ch. 85, 49 Stat. 163
- July 5, 1935: National Labor Relations Act (Wagner Act), Sess. 1, ch. 372, 49 Stat. 449
- August 9, 1935: Motor Carrier Act, Sess. 1, ch. 498, 49 Stat. 546 (renamed part II of the Interstate Commerce Act)
- August 14, 1935: Social Security Act, including Aid to Dependent Children, Old Age Pension Act, Pub. L. 74–271, Sess. 1, ch. 531, 49 Stat. 620
- August 23, 1935: Banking Act of 1935 49 Stat. 694
- August 26, 1935: Public Utility Act (including: Title I: Public Utility Holding Company Act of 1935, Title II: Federal Power Act), Sess. 1, ch. 687, 49 Stat. 803
- August 30, 1935: Revenue Act of 1935, Sess. 1, ch. 829, 49 Stat. 1014
- August 31, 1935: Neutrality Act of 1935, Sess. 1, ch. 837, 49 Stat. 1081
- February 29, 1936: Neutrality Act of 1936, Sess. 2, ch. 106, 49 Stat. 1153
- May 20, 1936: Rural Electrification Act, Sess. 2, ch. 432, 49 Stat. 1363
- June 15, 1936: Commodity Exchange Act, Sess. 2, ch. 545, 49 Stat. 1491
- June 19, 1936: Robinson Patman Act, Sess. 2, ch. 592, 49 Stat. 1526
- June 22, 1936: Flood Control Act of 1936, Pub. L. 74–738, Sess. 2, ch. 688
- June 29, 1936: Merchant Marine Act, Sess. 2, ch. 250, 49 Stat. 1985
- June 30, 1936: Walsh–Healey Public Contracts Act, Sess. 2, ch. 881, 49 Stat. 2036

== Party summary ==
=== Senate ===
	Party (shading shows control)					Total	Vacant
	Democratic (D)	Farmer– Labor (FL)	Wisconsin Progressive (P)	Republican (R)	Other	Total	Vacant
End of previous congress	60	1	0	35	0	96	0
Begin	68	1	1	25	0	95	1
End	72	1	1	22	0	96	0
Final voting share	75.0%	1.0%	1.0%	22.9%	0.0%		
Beginning of next congress	75	2	1	16	1	95	1

=== House ===
	Party (shading shows control)					Total	Vacant
	Democratic (D)	Farmer– Labor (FL)	Wisconsin Progressive (P)	Republican (R)	Other	Total	Vacant
End of previous congress	309	5	0	113	0	427	8
Begin	322	3	7	102	0	434	1
End	308	3	7	100	0	418	17
Final voting share	73.7%	0.7%	1.7%	23.9%	0.0%		
Beginning of next congress	333	5	7	89	1	435	0

== Leaders ==
Section contents: Senate: Majority (D), Minority (R) • House: Majority (D), Minority (R)

=== Senate ===
- President: John N. Garner (D)
- President pro tempore: Key Pittman (D)

==== Majority (Democratic) leadership ====
- Majority leader: Joseph T. Robinson
- Assistant majority leader (Majority whip): J. Hamilton Lewis
- Democratic Caucus Secretary: Hugo Black

==== Minority (Republican) leadership ====
- Minority leader: Charles L. McNary
- Assistant Minority leader (Minority whip): None
- Republican Conference Secretary: Frederick Hale
- National Senatorial Committee Chair: Daniel O. Hastings then John G. Townsend Jr.

=== House of Representatives ===
- Speaker: Jo Byrns (D), died June 4, 1936
  - William B. Bankhead (D), elected June 4, 1936

==== Majority (Democratic) leadership ====
- Majority leader:
  - William B. Bankhead, until June 4, 1936
  - John J. O'Connor
- Majority whip: Patrick J. Boland
- Democratic Caucus Chairman: Edward T. Taylor
- Democratic Campaign Committee Chairman: Patrick H. Drewry

==== Minority (Republican) leadership ====
- Minority leader: Bertrand H. Snell
- Minority whip: Harry L. Englebright
- Republican Conference Chairman: Frederick R. Lehlbach
- Republican Campaign Committee Chairman: Joseph W. Martin Jr.

== Members ==
=== Senate ===
Senators are popularly elected statewide every two years, with one-third beginning new six-year terms with each Congress. Preceding the names in the list below are Senate class numbers, which indicate the cycle of their election, In this Congress, Class 2 meant their term ended with this Congress, facing re-election in 1936; Class 3 meant their term began in the last Congress, facing re-election in 1938; and Class 1 meant their term began in this Congress, facing re-election in 1940.

==== Alabama ====
▌2. John H. Bankhead II (D)
▌3. Hugo Black (D)

==== Arizona ====
▌1. Henry F. Ashurst (D)
▌3. Carl Hayden (D)

==== Arkansas ====
▌2. Joseph Taylor Robinson (D)
▌3. Hattie Caraway (D)

==== California ====
▌1. Hiram W. Johnson (R)
▌3. William Gibbs McAdoo (D)

==== Colorado ====
▌2. Edward P. Costigan (D)
▌3. Alva B. Adams (D)

==== Connecticut ====
▌1. Francis Maloney (D)
▌3. Augustine Lonergan (D)

==== Delaware ====
▌1. John G. Townsend Jr. (R)
▌2. Daniel O. Hastings (R)

==== Florida ====
▌1. Park Trammell (D), until May 8, 1936

▌Scott Loftin (D), from May 26, 1936, until November 3, 1936
▌Charles O. Andrews (D), from November 4, 1936

▌3. Duncan U. Fletcher (D), until June 17, 1936

▌William Luther Hill (D), from July 1, 1936, until November 3, 1936
▌Claude Pepper (D), from November 4, 1936

==== Georgia ====
▌2. Walter F. George (D)
▌3. Richard Russell Jr. (D)

==== Idaho ====
▌2. William E. Borah (R)
▌3. James P. Pope (D)

==== Illinois ====
▌2. James Hamilton Lewis (D)
▌3. William H. Dieterich (D)

==== Indiana ====
▌1. Sherman Minton (D)
▌3. Frederick Van Nuys (D)

==== Iowa ====
▌2. Lester J. Dickinson (R)
▌3. Richard L. Murphy (D), until July 16, 1936

▌Guy M. Gillette (D), from November 3, 1936

==== Kansas ====
▌2. Arthur Capper (R)
▌3. George McGill (D)

==== Kentucky ====
▌2. Marvel M. Logan (D)
▌3. Alben W. Barkley (D)

==== Louisiana ====
▌2. Huey Long (D), until September 10, 1935

▌Rose McConnell Long (D), from January 31, 1936

▌3. John H. Overton (D)

==== Maine ====
▌1. Frederick Hale (R)
▌2. Wallace H. White Jr. (R)

==== Maryland ====
▌1. George L. P. Radcliffe (D)
▌3. Millard Tydings (D)

==== Massachusetts ====
▌1. David I. Walsh (D)
▌2. Marcus A. Coolidge (D)

==== Michigan ====
▌1. Arthur H. Vandenberg (R)
▌2. James J. Couzens (R), until October 22, 1936

▌Prentiss M. Brown (D), from November 19, 1936

==== Minnesota ====
▌1. Henrik Shipstead (FL)
▌2. Thomas D. Schall (R), until December 22, 1935

▌Elmer Austin Benson (FL), from December 27, 1935, until November 3, 1936
▌Guy V. Howard (R), from November 3, 1936

==== Mississippi ====
▌1. Theodore G. Bilbo (D)
▌2. Pat Harrison (D)

==== Missouri ====
▌1. Harry S. Truman (D)
▌3. Bennett Champ Clark (D)

==== Montana ====
▌1. Burton K. Wheeler (D)
▌2. James E. Murray (D)

==== Nebraska ====
▌1. Edward R. Burke (D)
▌2. George W. Norris (R)

==== Nevada ====
▌1. Key Pittman (D)
▌3. Pat McCarran (D)

==== New Hampshire ====
▌2. Henry W. Keyes (R)
▌3. Fred H. Brown (D)

==== New Jersey ====
▌1. A. Harry Moore (D)
▌2. William Warren Barbour (R)

==== New Mexico ====
▌1. Bronson M. Cutting (R), until May 6, 1935

▌Dennis Chávez (D), from May 11, 1935

▌2. Carl Hatch (D)

==== New York ====
▌1. Royal S. Copeland (D)
▌3. Robert F. Wagner (D)

==== North Carolina ====
▌2. Josiah William Bailey (D)
▌3. Robert R. Reynolds (D)

==== North Dakota ====
▌1. Lynn Frazier (R-NPL)
▌3. Gerald Nye (R)

==== Ohio ====
▌1. A. Victor Donahey (D)
▌3. Robert J. Bulkley (D)

==== Oklahoma ====
▌2. Thomas P. Gore (D)
▌3. Elmer Thomas (D)

==== Oregon ====
▌2. Charles L. McNary (R)
▌3. Frederick Steiwer (R)

==== Pennsylvania ====
▌1. Joseph F. Guffey (D)
▌3. James J. Davis (R)

==== Rhode Island ====
▌1. Peter G. Gerry (D)
▌2. Jesse H. Metcalf (R)

==== South Carolina ====
▌2. James F. Byrnes (D)
▌3. Ellison D. Smith (D)

==== South Dakota ====
▌2. William J. Bulow (D)
▌3. Peter Norbeck (R), until December 20, 1936

▌Herbert E. Hitchcock (D), from December 29, 1936

==== Tennessee ====
▌1. Kenneth McKellar (D)
▌2. Nathan L. Bachman (D)

==== Texas ====
▌1. Tom T. Connally (D)
▌2. Morris Sheppard (D)

==== Utah ====
▌1. William H. King (D)
▌3. Elbert D. Thomas (D)

==== Vermont ====
▌1. Warren Austin (R)
▌3. Ernest Willard Gibson (R)

==== Virginia ====
▌1. Harry F. Byrd (D)
▌2. Carter Glass (D)

==== Washington ====
▌1. Lewis B. Schwellenbach (D)
▌3. Homer Bone (D)

==== West Virginia ====
▌1. Rush D. Holt Sr. (D), from June 21, 1935
▌2. Matthew M. Neely (D)

==== Wisconsin ====
▌1. Robert M. La Follette Jr. (P)
▌3. F. Ryan Duffy (D)

==== Wyoming ====
▌1. Joseph C. O'Mahoney (D)
▌2. Robert D. Carey (R)

Senators' party membership by state at the opening of the 74th Congress in January 1935. The green stripes denote Senator Robert M. La Follette Jr. of the Progressive Party, and the gray stripes denote Farmer-Labor Senator Henrik Shipstead. 2 Democrats 1 Democrat and 1 Republican 2 Republicans

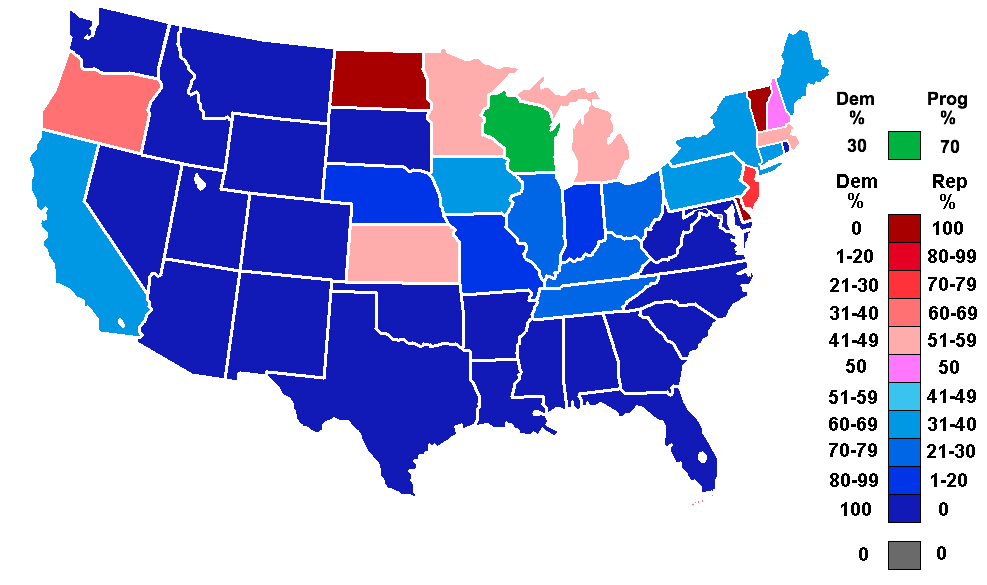
Percentage of members from each party by state at the opening of the 74th Congress, ranging from dark blue (most Democratic) to dark red (most Republican).

=== House of Representatives ===
The names of representatives are preceded by their district numbers.

==== Alabama ====
▌1. John McDuffie (D), until March 2, 1935

▌Frank W. Boykin (D), from July 30, 1935

▌2. J. Lister Hill (D)
▌3. Henry B. Steagall (D)
▌4. Sam Hobbs (D)
▌5. Joe Starnes (D)
▌6. William B. Oliver (D)
▌7. William B. Bankhead (D)
▌8. Archibald Hill Carmichael (D)
▌9. George Huddleston (D)

==== Arizona ====
▌At-large. Isabella Selmes Greenway (D)

==== Arkansas ====
▌1. William J. Driver (D)
▌2. John E. Miller (D)
▌3. Claude A. Fuller (D)
▌4. William B. Cravens (D)
▌5. David D. Terry (D)
▌6. John L. McClellan (D)
▌7. Tilman B. Parks (D)

==== California ====
▌1. Clarence F. Lea (D)
▌2. Harry L. Englebright (R)
▌3. Frank H. Buck (D)
▌4. Florence P. Kahn (R)
▌5. Richard J. Welch (R)
▌6. Albert E. Carter (R)
▌7. John H. Tolan (D)
▌8. John J. McGrath (D)
▌9. Bertrand W. Gearhart (R)
▌10. Henry E. Stubbs (D)
▌11. John S. McGroarty (D)
▌12. John H. Hoeppel (D)
▌13. Charles Kramer (D)
▌14. Thomas F. Ford (D)
▌15. John M. Costello (D)
▌16. John F. Dockweiler (D)
▌17. Charles J. Colden (D)
▌18. Byron N. Scott (D)
▌19. Sam L. Collins (R)
▌20. George Burnham (R)

==== Colorado ====
▌1. Lawrence Lewis (D)
▌2. Fred N. Cummings (D)
▌3. John A. Martin (D)
▌4. Edward T. Taylor (D)

==== Connecticut ====
▌1. Herman P. Kopplemann (D)
▌2. William L. Higgins (R)
▌3. James A. Shanley (D)
▌4. Schuyler Merritt (R)
▌5. J. Joseph Smith (D)
▌At-large. William M. Citron (D)

==== Delaware ====
▌At-large. J. George Stewart (R)

==== Florida ====
▌1. J. Hardin Peterson (D)
▌2. Robert A. Green (D)
▌3. Millard F. Caldwell (D)
▌4. J. Mark Wilcox (D)
▌At-large. William J. Sears (D)

==== Georgia ====
▌1. Hugh Peterson (D)
▌2. Edward E. Cox (D)
▌3. Bryant T. Castellow (D)
▌4. Emmett M. Owen (D)
▌5. Robert Ramspeck (D)
▌6. Carl Vinson (D)
▌7. Malcolm C. Tarver (D)
▌8. Braswell Deen (D)
▌9. B. Frank Whelchel (D)
▌10. Paul Brown (D)

==== Idaho ====
▌1. Compton I. White (D)
▌2. D. Worth Clark (D)

==== Illinois ====
▌1. Arthur W. Mitchell (D)
▌2. Raymond S. McKeough (D)
▌3. Edward A. Kelly (D)
▌4. Harry P. Beam (D)
▌5. Adolph J. Sabath (D)
▌6. Thomas J. O'Brien (D)
▌7. Leonard W. Schuetz (D)
▌8. Leo Kocialkowski (D)
▌9. James McAndrews (D)
▌10. Ralph E. Church (R)
▌11. Chauncey W. Reed (R)
▌12. John T. Buckbee (R), until April 23, 1936
▌13. Leo E. Allen (R)
▌14. Chester C. Thompson (D)
▌15. J. Leroy Adair (D)
▌16. Everett M. Dirksen (R)
▌17. Leslie C. Arends (R)
▌18. James A. Meeks (D)
▌19. Donald C. Dobbins (D)
▌20. Scott W. Lucas (D)
▌21. Harry H. Mason (D)
▌22. Edwin M. Schaefer (D)
▌23. William W. Arnold (D), until September 16, 1935
▌24. Claude V. Parsons (D)
▌25. Kent E. Keller (D)
▌At-large. Martin A. Brennan (D)
▌At-large. Michael L. Igoe (D), until June 2, 1935

==== Indiana ====
▌1. William T. Schulte (D)
▌2. Charles A. Halleck (R), from January 29, 1935
▌3. Samuel B. Pettengill (D)
▌4. James I. Farley (D)
▌5. Glenn Griswold (D)
▌6. Virginia E. Jenckes (D)
▌7. Arthur H. Greenwood (D)
▌8. John W. Boehne Jr. (D)
▌9. Eugene B. Crowe (D)
▌10. Finly H. Gray (D)
▌11. William H. Larrabee (D)
▌12. Louis Ludlow (D)

==== Iowa ====
▌1. Edward C. Eicher (D)
▌2. Bernhard M. Jacobsen (D), until June 30, 1936
▌3. John W. Gwynne (R)
▌4. Fred Biermann (D)
▌5. Lloyd Thurston (R)
▌6. Hubert Utterback (D)
▌7. Otha D. Wearin (D)
▌8. Fred C. Gilchrist (R)
▌9. Guy M. Gillette (D), until November 3, 1936

==== Kansas ====
▌1. William P. Lambertson (R)
▌2. Ulysses S. Guyer (R)
▌3. Edward White Patterson (D)
▌4. Randolph Carpenter (D)
▌5. John Mills Houston (D)
▌6. Frank Carlson (R)
▌7. Clifford R. Hope (R)

==== Kentucky ====
▌1. W. Voris Gregory (D), until October 10, 1936
▌2. Glover H. Cary (D), until December 5, 1936
▌3. Emmet O'Neal (D)
▌4. Cap R. Carden (D), until June 13, 1935

▌Edward W. Creal (D), from November 5, 1935

▌5. Brent Spence (D)
▌6. Virgil Chapman (D)
▌7. Andrew J. May (D)
▌8. Fred M. Vinson (D)
▌9. John M. Robsion (R)

==== Louisiana ====
▌1. Joachim O. Fernández (D)
▌2. Paul H. Maloney (D)
▌3. Numa F. Montet (D)
▌4. John N. Sandlin (D)
▌5. Riley Joseph Wilson (D)
▌6. Jared Y. Sanders Jr. (D)
▌7. René L. DeRouen (D)
▌8. Cleveland Dear (D)

==== Maine ====
▌1. Simon M. Hamlin (D)
▌2. Edward C. Moran Jr. (D)
▌3. Ralph Owen Brewster (R)

==== Maryland ====
▌1. T. Alan Goldsborough (D)
▌2. William P. Cole Jr. (D)
▌3. Vincent L. Palmisano (D)
▌4. Ambrose J. Kennedy (D)
▌5. Stephen W. Gambrill (D)
▌6. David J. Lewis (D)

==== Massachusetts ====
▌1. Allen T. Treadway (R)
▌2. William J. Granfield (D)
▌3. Joseph E. Casey (D)
▌4. Pehr G. Holmes (R)
▌5. Edith Nourse Rogers (R)
▌6. A. Piatt Andrew Jr. (R), until June 3, 1936
▌7. William P. Connery Jr. (D)
▌8. Arthur D. Healey (D)
▌9. Richard M. Russell (D)
▌10. George H. Tinkham (R)
▌11. John P. Higgins (D)
▌12. John W. McCormack (D)
▌13. Richard B. Wigglesworth (R)
▌14. Joseph W. Martin Jr. (R)
▌15. Charles L. Gifford (R)

==== Michigan ====
▌1. George G. Sadowski (D)
▌2. Earl C. Michener (R)
▌3. Henry M. Kimball (R), until October 19, 1935

▌Verner Main (R), from December 17, 1935

▌4. Clare E. Hoffman (R)
▌5. Carl Mapes (R)
▌6. William W. Blackney (R)
▌7. Jesse P. Wolcott (R)
▌8. Fred L. Crawford (R)
▌9. Albert J. Engel (R)
▌10. Roy O. Woodruff (R)
▌11. Prentiss M. Brown (D), until November 18, 1936
▌12. Frank Hook (D)
▌13. Clarence J. McLeod (R)
▌14. Louis C. Rabaut (D)
▌15. John D. Dingell Sr. (D)
▌16. John Lesinski Sr. (D)
▌17. George A. Dondero (R)

==== Minnesota ====
▌1. August H. Andresen (R)
▌2. Elmer Ryan (D)
▌3. Ernest Lundeen (FL)
▌4. Melvin Maas (R)
▌5. Theodore Christianson (R)
▌6. Harold Knutson (R)
▌7. Paul J. Kvale (FL)
▌8. William Pittenger (R)
▌9. Rich T. Buckler (FL)

==== Mississippi ====
▌1. John E. Rankin (D)
▌2. Wall Doxey (D)
▌3. William M. Whittington (D)
▌4. Aaron L. Ford (D)
▌5. Aubert C. Dunn (D)
▌6. William M. Colmer (D)
▌7. Dan R. McGehee (D)

==== Missouri ====
▌1. Milton A. Romjue (D)
▌2. William L. Nelson (D)
▌3. Richard M. Duncan (D)
▌4. C. Jasper Bell (D)
▌5. Joseph B. Shannon (D)
▌6. Reuben T. Wood (D)
▌7. Dewey Short (R)
▌8. Clyde Williams (D)
▌9. Clarence Cannon (D)
▌10. Orville Zimmerman (D)
▌11. Thomas C. Hennings Jr. (D)
▌12. James Robert Claiborne (D)
▌13. John J. Cochran (D)

==== Montana ====
▌1. Joseph P. Monaghan (D)
▌2. Roy E. Ayers (D)

==== Nebraska ====
▌1. Henry Carl Luckey (D)
▌2. Charles F. McLaughlin (D)
▌3. Karl Stefan (R)
▌4. Charles Gustav Binderup (D)
▌5. Harry B. Coffee (D)

==== Nevada ====
▌At-large. James G. Scrugham (D)

==== New Hampshire ====
▌1. William N. Rogers (D)
▌2. Charles W. Tobey (R)

==== New Jersey ====
▌1. Charles A. Wolverton (R)
▌2. Isaac Bacharach (R)
▌3. William H. Sutphin (D)
▌4. D. Lane Powers (R)
▌5. Charles A. Eaton (R)
▌6. Donald H. McLean (R)
▌7. Randolph Perkins (R), until May 25, 1936
▌8. George N. Seger (R)
▌9. Edward A. Kenney (D)
▌10. Fred A. Hartley Jr. (R)
▌11. Peter A. Cavicchia (R)
▌12. Frederick R. Lehlbach (R)
▌13. Mary T. Norton (D)
▌14. Edward J. Hart (D)

==== New Mexico ====
▌At-large. John J. Dempsey (D)

==== New York ====
▌1. Robert L. Bacon (R)
▌2. William F. Brunner (D), until September 27, 1935

▌William B. Barry (D), from November 5, 1935

▌3. Joseph L. Pfeifer (D)
▌4. Thomas H. Cullen (D)
▌5. Marcellus H. Evans (D)
▌6. Andrew L. Somers (D)
▌7. John J. Delaney (D)
▌8. Richard J. Tonry (D)
▌9. Stephen A. Rudd (D), until March 31, 1936
▌10. Emanuel Celler (D)
▌11. James A. O'Leary (D)
▌12. Samuel Dickstein (D)
▌13. Christopher D. Sullivan (D)
▌14. William I. Sirovich (D)
▌15. John J. Boylan (D)
▌16. John J. O'Connor (D)
▌17. Theodore A. Peyser (D)
▌18. Martin J. Kennedy (D)
▌19. Sol Bloom (D)
▌20. Vito Marcantonio (R)
▌21. Joseph A. Gavagan (D)
▌22. Anthony J. Griffin (D), until January 13, 1935

▌Edward W. Curley (D), from November 5, 1935

▌23. Charles A. Buckley (D)
▌24. James M. Fitzpatrick (D)
▌25. Charles D. Millard (R)
▌26. Hamilton Fish III (R)
▌27. Philip A. Goodwin (R)
▌28. Parker Corning (D)
▌29. William D. Thomas (R), until May 17, 1936
▌30. Frank Crowther (R)
▌31. Bertrand H. Snell (R)
▌32. Francis D. Culkin (R)
▌33. Fred J. Sisson (D)
▌34. Bert Lord (R)
▌35. Clarence E. Hancock (R)
▌36. John Taber (R)
▌37. W. Sterling Cole (R)
▌38. James P.B. Duffy (D)
▌39. James W. Wadsworth Jr. (R)
▌40. Walter G. Andrews (R)
▌41. Alfred F. Beiter (D)
▌42. James M. Mead (D)
▌43. Daniel A. Reed (R)
▌At-large. Matthew J. Merritt (D)
▌At-large. Caroline O'Day (D)

==== North Carolina ====
▌1. Lindsay C. Warren (D)
▌2. John H. Kerr (D)
▌3. Graham A. Barden (D)
▌4. Harold D. Cooley (D)
▌5. Franklin W. Hancock Jr. (D)
▌6. William B. Umstead (D)
▌7. J. Bayard Clark (D)
▌8. J. Walter Lambeth (D)
▌9. Robert L. Doughton (D)
▌10. Alfred L. Bulwinkle (D)
▌11. Zebulon Weaver (D)

==== North Dakota ====
▌At-large. William Lemke (R-NPL)
▌At-large. Usher L. Burdick (R-NPL)

==== Ohio ====
▌1. John B. Hollister (R)
▌2. William E. Hess (R)
▌3. Byron B. Harlan (D)
▌4. Frank Le Blond Kloeb (D)
▌5. Frank C. Kniffin (D)
▌6. James G. Polk (D)
▌7. Leroy T. Marshall (R)
▌8. Thomas B. Fletcher (D)
▌9. Warren J. Duffey (D), until July 7, 1936
▌10. Thomas A. Jenkins (R)
▌11. Mell G. Underwood (D), until April 10, 1936

▌Peter F. Hammond (D), from November 3, 1936

▌12. Arthur P. Lamneck (D)
▌13. William L. Fiesinger (D)
▌14. Dow W. Harter (D)
▌15. Robert T. Secrest (D)
▌16. William R. Thom (D)
▌17. William A. Ashbrook (D)
▌18. Lawrence E. Imhoff (D)
▌19. John G. Cooper (R)
▌20. Martin L. Sweeney (D)
▌21. Robert Crosser (D)
▌22. Chester C. Bolton (R)
▌At-large. Charles V. Truax (D), until August 9, 1935

▌Daniel S. Earhart (D), from November 3, 1936

▌At-large. Stephen M. Young (D)

==== Oklahoma ====
▌1. Wesley E. Disney (D)
▌2. John Conover Nichols (D)
▌3. Wilburn Cartwright (D)
▌4. Percy Lee Gassaway (D)
▌5. Joshua B. Lee (D)
▌6. Jed J. Johnson (D)
▌7. Sam C. Massingale (D)
▌8. Phil Ferguson (D)
▌At-large. Will Rogers (D)

==== Oregon ====
▌1. James W. Mott (R)
▌2. Walter M. Pierce (D)
▌3. William A. Ekwall (R)

==== Pennsylvania ====
▌1. Harry C. Ransley (R)
▌2. William H. Wilson (R)
▌3. Clare G. Fenerty (R)
▌4. J. Burrwood Daly (D)
▌5. Frank J. G. Dorsey (D)
▌6. Michael J. Stack (D)
▌7. George P. Darrow (R)
▌8. James Wolfenden (R)
▌9. Oliver Walter Frey (D)
▌10. J. Roland Kinzer (R)
▌11. Patrick J. Boland (D)
▌12. C. Murray Turpin (R)
▌13. James H. Gildea (D)
▌14. William Emanuel Richardson (D)
▌15. Charles E. Dietrich (D)
▌16. Robert F. Rich (R)
▌17. J. William Ditter (R)
▌18. Benjamin K. Focht (R)
▌19. Isaac Hoffer Doutrich (R)
▌20. Denis J. Driscoll (D)
▌21. Francis E. Walter (D)
▌22. Harry L. Haines (D)
▌23. Don Gingery (D)
▌24. J. Buell Snyder (D)
▌25. Charles I. Faddis (D)
▌26. Charles R. Eckert (D)
▌27. Joseph Gray (D)
▌28. William M. Berlin (D)
▌29. Charles N. Crosby (D)
▌30. J. Twing Brooks (D)
▌31. James L. Quinn (D)
▌32. Theodore L. Moritz (D)
▌33. Henry Ellenbogen (D)
▌34. Matthew A. Dunn (D)

==== Rhode Island ====
▌1. Francis B. Condon (D), until January 10, 1935

▌Charles Risk (R), from August 6, 1935

▌2. John M. O'Connell (D)

==== South Carolina ====
▌1. Thomas S. McMillan (D)
▌2. Hampton P. Fulmer (D)
▌3. John C. Taylor (D)
▌4. John J. McSwain (D), until August 6, 1936

▌Gabriel H. Mahon Jr. (D), from November 3, 1936

▌5. James P. Richards (D)
▌6. Allard H. Gasque (D)

==== South Dakota ====
▌1. Fred H. Hildebrandt (D)
▌2. Theodore B. Werner (D)

==== Tennessee ====
▌1. B. Carroll Reece (R)
▌2. J. Will Taylor (R)
▌3. Samuel D. McReynolds (D)
▌4. John Ridley Mitchell (D)
▌5. Joseph W. Byrns (D), until June 4, 1936
▌6. Clarence W. Turner (D)
▌7. Herron C. Pearson (D)
▌8. Jere Cooper (D)
▌9. Walter Chandler (D)

==== Texas ====
▌1. Wright Patman (D)
▌2. Martin Dies Jr. (D)
▌3. Morgan G. Sanders (D)
▌4. Sam Rayburn (D)
▌5. Hatton W. Sumners (D)
▌6. Luther Alexander Johnson (D)
▌7. Nat Patton (D)
▌8. Joe H. Eagle (D)
▌9. Joseph J. Mansfield (D)
▌10. James P. Buchanan (D)
▌11. Oliver H. Cross (D)
▌12. Fritz G. Lanham (D)
▌13. William D. McFarlane (D)
▌14. Richard M. Kleberg (D)
▌15. Milton H. West (D)
▌16. R. Ewing Thomason (D)
▌17. Thomas L. Blanton (D)
▌18. John Marvin Jones (D)
▌19. George H. Mahon (D)
▌20. Maury Maverick (D)
▌21. Charles L. South (D)

==== Utah ====
▌1. Abe Murdock (D)
▌2. J. W. Robinson (D)

==== Vermont ====
▌At-large. Charles A. Plumley (R)

==== Virginia ====
▌1. S. Otis Bland (D)
▌2. Colgate W. Darden Jr. (D)
▌3. Andrew Jackson Montague (D)
▌4. Patrick H. Drewry (D)
▌5. Thomas G. Burch (D)
▌6. Clifton A. Woodrum (D)
▌7. A. Willis Robertson (D)
▌8. Howard W. Smith (D)
▌9. John W. Flannagan Jr. (D)

==== Washington ====
▌1. Marion Anthony Zioncheck (D), until August 7, 1936
▌2. Monrad C. Wallgren (D)
▌3. Martin F. Smith (D)
▌4. Knute Hill (D)
▌5. Samuel B. Hill (D), until June 25, 1936
▌6. Wesley Lloyd (D), until January 10, 1936

==== West Virginia ====
▌1. Robert L. Ramsay (D)
▌2. Jennings Randolph (D)
▌3. Andrew Edmiston Jr. (D)
▌4. George W. Johnson (D)
▌5. John Kee (D)
▌6. Joe L. Smith (D)

==== Wisconsin ====
▌1. Thomas Ryum Amlie (P)
▌2. Harry Sauthoff (P)
▌3. Gardner R. Withrow (P)
▌4. Raymond Joseph Cannon (D)
▌5. Thomas David Patrick O'Malley (D)
▌6. Michael K. Reilly (D)
▌7. Gerald J. Boileau (P)
▌8. George J. Schneider (P)
▌9. Merlin Hull (P)
▌10. Bernard J. Gehrmann (P)

==== Wyoming ====
▌At-large. Paul Ranous Greever (D)

==== Non-voting members ====
▌Alaska Territory. Anthony J. Dimond (D)
▌Hawaii Territory. Samuel Wilder King (R)
▌Philippines. Francisco A. Delgado (Nac.), until February 14, 1936

▌Quintin Paredes (Nac.), from February 14, 1936

▌Philippines. Pedro Guevara (Nac.), until February 14, 1936
▌Puerto Rico. Santiago Iglesias Pantín (Coalitionist)

== Changes of membership ==
The count below reflects changes from the beginning of this Congress.

=== Senate ===
Senate changes
State (class)	Vacated by	Reason for change	Successor	Date of successor's formal installation (Note: When seated or oath administered, not necessarily when service began.)
West Virginia (1)	Vacant	Senator-elect Holt qualified late due to age having not yet been constitutionally old enough to serve. Holt was seated when he turned 30	Rush D. Holt Sr. (D)	June 21, 1935
New Mexico (1)	Bronson M. Cutting (R)	Died May 6, 1935. Successor was appointed to serve until the next election, and was subsequently elected.	Dennis Chavez (D)	May 11, 1935
Louisiana (2)	Huey Long (D)	Died September 10, 1935. Successor was appointed to serve until a special election, and was subsequently elected.	Rose McConnell Long (D)	January 31, 1936
Minnesota (2)	Thomas D. Schall (R)	Died December 22, 1935. Successor was appointed to serve until a special election.	Elmer Austin Benson (FL)	December 27, 1935
Florida (1)	Park Trammell (D)	Died May 8, 1936. Successor was appointed to serve until a special election.	Scott Loftin (D)	May 26, 1936
Florida (3)	Duncan U. Fletcher (D)	Died June 17, 1936. Successor was appointed to serve until a special election.	William Luther Hill (D)	July 1, 1936
Iowa (3)	Richard L. Murphy (D)	Died July 16, 1936. Successor was elected to finish the term.	Guy Gillette (D)	November 4, 1936
Michigan (2)	James J. Couzens (R)	Died October 22, 1936. Successor was appointed to finish the remaining term having already been elected to the next term.	Prentiss M. Brown (D)	November 19, 1936
Minnesota (2)	Elmer Austin Benson (FL)	Successor was elected November 3, 1936.	Guy V. Howard (R)	November 4, 1936
Florida (1)	Scott Loftin (D)	Successor was elected November 3, 1936.	Charles O. Andrews (D)	November 4, 1936
Florida (3)	William Luther Hill (D)	Successor was elected November 3, 1936.	Claude Pepper (D)	November 4, 1936
South Dakota (3)	Peter Norbeck (R)	Died December 20, 1936. Successor was appointed to serve until the next election.	Herbert E. Hitchcock (D)	December 29, 1936

=== House of Representatives ===
House changes
District	Vacated by	Reason for change	Successor	Date of successor's formal installation
Indiana 2nd	Vacant	Rep.-elect Frederick Landis died before being sworn in	Charles A. Halleck (R)	January 29, 1935
Rhode Island 1st	Francis Condon (D)	Resigned January 10, 1935, after being appointed associate justice of the Rhode Island Supreme Court	Charles Risk (R)	August 6, 1935
New York 22nd	Anthony J. Griffin (D)	Died January 13, 1935	Edward W. Curley (D)	November 5, 1935
Alabama 1st	John McDuffie (D)	Resigned March 2, 1935, after being appointed judge in US district court	Frank W. Boykin (D)	July 30, 1935
Illinois at-large	Michael L. Igoe (D)	Resigned June 2, 1935, after being appointed a US attorney for the Northern District of Illinois	Vacant until the next Congress	
Kentucky 4th	Cap R. Carden (D)	Died June 13, 1935	Edward W. Creal (D)	November 5, 1935
Ohio at-large	Charles V. Truax (D)	Died August 9, 1935	Daniel S. Earhart (D)	November 3, 1936
Illinois 23rd	William W. Arnold (D)	Resigned September 16, 1935, after being appointed a member of the US Board of Tax Appeals	Vacant until the next Congress	
New York 2nd	William F. Brunner (D)	Resigned September 27, 1935, after being elected Sheriff of Queens County, New York	William B. Barry (D)	November 5, 1935
Michigan 3rd	Henry M. Kimball (R)	Died October 19, 1935	Verner Main (R)	December 17, 1935
Washington 6th	Wesley Lloyd (D)	Died January 10, 1936	Vacant until the next Congress	
Philippines Resident Commissioner	Francisco A. Delgado (NAC)	Resigned February 14, 1936, after a successor qualified in accordance to a new form of government	Quintin Paredes (NAC)	February 14, 1936
Philippines Resident Commissioner	Pedro Guevara (NAC)	Resigned February 14, 1936, after the 2nd seat was abolished	None	
New York 9th	Stephen A. Rudd (D)	Died March 31, 1936	Vacant until the next Congress	
Ohio 11th	Mell G. Underwood (D)	Resigned April 10, 1936, after being appointed to the US District Court for the Southern District of Ohio	Peter F. Hammond (D)	November 3, 1936
Illinois 12th	John T. Buckbee (R)	Died April 23, 1936	Vacant until the next Congress	
New York 29th	William D. Thomas (R)	Died May 17, 1936	Vacant until the next Congress	
New Jersey 7th	Randolph Perkins (R)	Died May 25, 1936	Vacant until the next Congress	
Massachusetts 6th	A. Piatt Andrew (R)	Died June 3, 1936	Vacant until the next Congress	
Tennessee 5th	Jo Byrns (D)	Died June 4, 1936	Vacant until the next Congress	
Washington 5th	Samuel B. Hill (D)	Resigned June 25, 1936, after being appointed a member of the US Board of Tax Appeals	Vacant until the next Congress	
Iowa 2nd	Bernhard M. Jacobsen (D)	Died June 30, 1936	Vacant until the next Congress	
Ohio 9th	Warren J. Duffey (D)	Died July 7, 1936	Vacant until the next Congress	
South Carolina 4th	John J. McSwain (D)	Died August 6, 1936	Gabriel H. Mahon Jr. (D)	November 3, 1936
Washington 1st	Marion Zioncheck (D)	Died August 7, 1936	Vacant until the next Congress	
Kentucky 1st	William V. Gregory (D)	Died October 10, 1936	Vacant until the next Congress	
Iowa 9th	Guy Gillette (D)	Resigned November 3, 1936, after being elected to the U.S. Senate	Vacant until the next Congress	
Michigan 11th	Prentiss M. Brown (D)	Resigned November 18, 1936, after being appointed to the U.S. Senate having already been elected.	Vacant until the next Congress	
Kentucky 2nd	Glover H. Cary (D)	Died December 5, 1936	Vacant until the next Congress	

== Committees ==
Lists of committees and their party leaders for members of the House and Senate committees can be found through the Official Congressional Directory at the bottom of this article. The directory after the pages of terms of service lists committees of the Senate, House (Standing with Subcommittees, Select and Special) and Joint and, after that, House/Senate committee assignments. On the committees section of the House and Senate in the Official Congressional Directory, the committee's members on the first row on the left side shows the chairman of the committee and on the right side shows the ranking member of the committee.

=== Senate ===
- Agriculture and Forestry (Chairman: Ellison D. Smith; Ranking Member: George W. Norris)
- Air Mail and Ocean Mail Contracts (Special)
- Appropriations (Chairman: Carter Glass; Ranking Member: Frederick Hale)
- Audit and Control the Contingent Expenses of the Senate (Chairman: James F. Byrnes; Ranking Member: John G. Townsend Jr.)
- Banking and Currency (Chairman: Duncan U. Fletcher; Ranking Member: Peter Norbeck)
- Bankruptcy and Receiveship (Select)
- Campaign Expenditures Investigation (Special) (Chairman: James F. Byrnes)
- Civil Service (Chairman: William J. Bulow; Ranking Member: Wallace H. White Jr.)
- Claims (Chairman: Josiah W. Bailey; Ranking Member: Arthur Capper)
- Commerce (Chairman: Royal S. Copeland; Ranking Member: Charles L. McNary)
- District of Columbia (Chairman: William H. King; Ranking Member: Arthur Capper)
- Education and Labor (Chairman: David I. Walsh; Ranking Member: William E. Borah)
  - Investigation Violations of Free Speech and the Rights of Labor
- Enrolled Bills (Chairman: Hattie W. Caraway; Ranking Member: Arthur H. Vandenberg)
- Executive Agencies of the Government (Select)
- Expenditures in Executive Departments (Chairman: J. Hamilton Lewis; Ranking Member: Daniel O. Hastings)
- Finance (Chairman: Pat Harrison; Ranking Member: James Couzens)
- Foreign Relations (Chairman: Key Pittman; Ranking Member: William E. Borah)
- Immigration (Chairman: Marcus A. Coolidge; Ranking Member: Hiram W. Johnson)
- Indian Affairs (Chairman: Elmer Thomas; Ranking Member: Lynn J. Frazier)
- Interoceanic Canals (Chairman: Thomas P. Gore; Ranking Member: Thomas D. Schall then W. Warren Barbour)
- Interstate Commerce (Chairman: Burton K. Wheeler; Ranking Member: James Couzens)
- Irrigation and Reclamation (Chairman: Alva B. Adams; Ranking Member: Charles L. McNary)
- Judiciary (Chairman: Henry F. Ashurst; Ranking Member: William E. Borah)
- Land and Water Policies of the United States (Special)
- Library (Chairman: Alben W. Barkley; Ranking Member: Peter Norbeck)
- Lobbying Activities (Select)
- Manufactures (Chairman: Robert J. Bulkley; Ranking Member: Charles L. McNary)
- Military Affairs (Chairman: Morris Sheppard; Ranking Member: Bronson Cutting then Robert D. Carey)
- Mines and Mining (Chairman: M.M. Logan; Ranking Member: Lynn J. Frazier)
- Mississippi Flood Control Project (Select) (Chairman: Robert F. Wagner)
- Naval Affairs (Chairman: Park Trammell; Ranking Member: Frederick Hale)
- Patents (Chairman: William Gibbs McAdoo; Ranking Member: George W. Norris)
- Pensions (Chairman: George McGill; Ranking Member: Thomas D. Schall)
- Philippines Economic Condition (Special)
- Post Office and Post Roads (Chairman: Kenneth McKellar; Ranking Member: Thomas D. Schall)
- Presidential and Senatorial Campaign Expenditures (Special)
- Printing (Chairman: Carl Hayden; Ranking Member: Arthur H. Vandenberg)
- Privileges and Elections (Chairman: Walter F. George; Ranking Member: Daniel O. Hastings)
- Public Buildings and Grounds (Chairman: Tom Connally; Ranking Member: Henry W. Keyes)
- Public Lands and Surveys (Chairman: Robert F. Wagner; Ranking Member: Peter Norbeck)
- Rules (Chairman: Matthew M. Neely; Ranking Member: Frederick Hale)
- Silver (Special)
- Territories and Insular Affairs (Chairman: Millard E. Tydings; Ranking Member: Hiram W. Johnson)
- Virgin Islands (Select)
- Whole
- Wildlife Resources (Special) (Chairman: Vacant; Ranking Member: Vacant)
- Wool Production (Special)

=== House of Representatives ===
- Accounts (Chairman: Lindsay C. Warren; Ranking Member: James Wolfenden)
- Agriculture (Chairman: J. Marvin Jones; Ranking Member: Clifford R. Hope)
- American Retail Federation (Special)
- Appropriations (Chairman: James P. Buchanan; Ranking Member: John Taber)
- Banking and Currency (Chairman: Henry B. Steagall; Ranking Member: John B. Hollister)
- Census (Chairman: William H. Larrabee; Ranking Member: J. Roland Kinzer)
- Civil Service (Chairman: Robert Ramspeck; Ranking Member: Frederick R. Lehlbach)
- Claims (Chairman: Ambrose J. Kennedy; Ranking Member: Ulysses S. Guyer)
- Coinage, Weights and Measures (Chairman: Andrew Somers; Ranking Member: Randolph Perkins)
- Conservation of Wildlife Resources (Select) (Chairman: A. Willis Robertson)
- Disposition of Executive Papers (Chairman: Ambrose J. Kennedy; Ranking Member: N/A)
- District of Columbia (Chairman: Mary Teresa Norton; Ranking Member: Gardner Withrow)
- Education (Chairman: Vincent L. Palmisano; Ranking Member: Albert E. Carter)
- Election of the President, Vice President and Representatives in Congress (Chairman: Thomas B. Fletcher; Ranking Member: Charles L. Gifford)
- Elections No.#1 (Chairman: Cleveland Dear; Ranking Member: John B. Hollister)
- Elections No.#2 (Chairman: Joseph A. Gavagan; Ranking Member: Ulysses S. Guyer)
- Elections No.#3 (Chairman: John H. Kerr; Ranking Member: Charles L. Gifford)
- Enrolled Bills (Chairman: Claude V. Parsons; Ranking Member: N/A)
- Expenditures in the Executive Departments (Chairman: John J. Cochran; Ranking Member: Charles L. Gifford)
- Flood Control (Chairman: Riley J. Wilson; Ranking Member: Robert F. Rich)
- Foreign Affairs (Chairman: Sam D. McReynolds; Ranking Member: Hamilton Fish III)
- Immigration and Naturalization (Chairman: Samuel Dickstein; Ranking Member: J. Will Taylor)
- Indian Affairs (Chairman: Will Rogers; Ranking Member: Fred C. Gilchrist)
- Insular Affairs (Chairman: Leo Kocialkowski; Ranking Member: Lloyd Thurston)
- Interstate and Foreign Commerce (Chairman: Sam Rayburn; Ranking Member: John G. Cooper)
- Invalid Pensions (Chairman: John Lesinski; Ranking Member: Charles D. Millard)
- Investigate Real Estate Beholder's Reorganizations (Select) (Chairman: N/A)
- Irrigation and Reclamation (Chairman: Compton I. White; Ranking Member: Fred A. Hartley Jr.)
- Judiciary (Chairman: Hatton W. Sumners; Ranking Member: Randolph Perkins)
- Labor (Chairman: William P. Connery Jr.; Ranking Member: Richard J. Welch)
- Library (Chairman: Kent E. Keller; Ranking Member: N/A)
- Memorials (Chairman: Simon M. Hamlin; Ranking Member: Frank Crowther)
- Merchant Marine and Fisheries (Chairman: S. Otis Bland; Ranking Member: Frederick R. Lehlbach)
- Military Affairs (Chairman: John J. McSwain; Ranking Member: Harry C. Ransley)
- Mines and Mining (Chairman: Joe L. Smith; Ranking Member: Anthony J. Dimond)
- Naval Affairs (Chairman: Carl Vinson; Ranking Member: George P. Darrow)
- Patents (Chairman: William I. Sirovich; Ranking Member: Randolph Perkins)
- Pensions (Chairman: Allard H. Gasque; Ranking Member: Richard J. Welch)
- Post Office and Post Roads (Chairman: James M. Mead; Ranking Member: Charles E. Dietrich)
- Public Buildings and Grounds (Chairman: Fritz G. Lanham; Ranking Member: Robert F. Rich)
- Public Lands (Chairman: Rene L. DeRouen; Ranking Member: Harry Lane Englebright)
- Revision of Laws (Chairman: Raymond J. Cannon; Ranking Member: Jesse P. Wolcott)
- Rivers and Harbors (Chairman: Joseph J. Mansfield; Ranking Member: George N. Seger)
- Roads (Chairman: Wilburn Cartwright; Ranking Member: C. Murray Turpin)
- Rules (Chairman: John J. O'Connor; Ranking Member: Harry C. Ransley)
- Standards of Official Conduct
- Territories (Chairman: Robert A. Green; Ranking Member: Harry Lane Englebright)
- War Claims (Chairman: John H. Hoeppel; Ranking Member: Gerald J. Boileau)
- Ways and Means (Chairman: Robert L. Doughton; Ranking Member: Allen T. Treadway)
- World War Veterans' Legislation (Chairman: John E. Rankin; Ranking Member: Randolph Perkins)
- Whole

=== Joint committees ===
- Conditions of Indian Tribes (Special)
- Disposition of (Useless) Executive Papers
- The Library (Chairman: Sen. Alben W. Barkley; Vice Chairman: Rep. )
- Printing (Chairman: Sen. Duncan U. Fletcher; Vice Chairman: Rep. J. Walter Lambeth)
- Taxation (Chairman: Rep. Robert L. Doughton; Vice Chairman: Sen. Pat Harrison)

== Caucuses ==
- Democratic (House)
- Democratic (Senate)

== Employees ==
=== Legislative branch agency directors ===
- Architect of the Capitol: David Lynn
- Attending Physician of the United States Congress: George Calver
- Comptroller General of the United States: John R. McCarl, until June 30, 1936
  - vacant thereafter
- Librarian of Congress: Herbert Putnam
- Public Printer of the United States: Augustus E. Giegengack

=== Senate ===
- Secretary: Edwin A. Halsey
- Librarian: Ruskin McArdle
- Chaplain: ZeBarney Thorne Phillips (Episcopalian)
- Parliamentarian: Charles Watkins, from 1935
- Sergeant at Arms: Chesley W. Jurney
- Democratic Party Secretary: Leslie Biffle
- Republican Party Secretary: Carl A. Loeffler

=== House of Representatives ===
- Clerk: South Trimble
- Doorkeeper: Joseph J. Sinnott
- Postmaster: Finis E. Scott
- Parliamentarian: Lewis Deschler
- Reading Clerks: Patrick Joseph Haltigan (D) (until 1936) and Alney E. Chaffee (R)
- Sergeant at Arms: Kenneth Romney
- Chaplain: James Shera Montgomery - Methodist

== See also ==
- 1934 United States elections (elections leading to this Congress)
  - 1934 United States Senate elections
  - 1934 United States House of Representatives elections
- 1936 United States elections (elections during this Congress, leading to the next Congress)
  - 1936 United States presidential election
  - 1936 United States Senate elections
  - 1936 United States House of Representatives elections
