= L. L. Marshall =

American politician

Lycurgus Luther Marshall
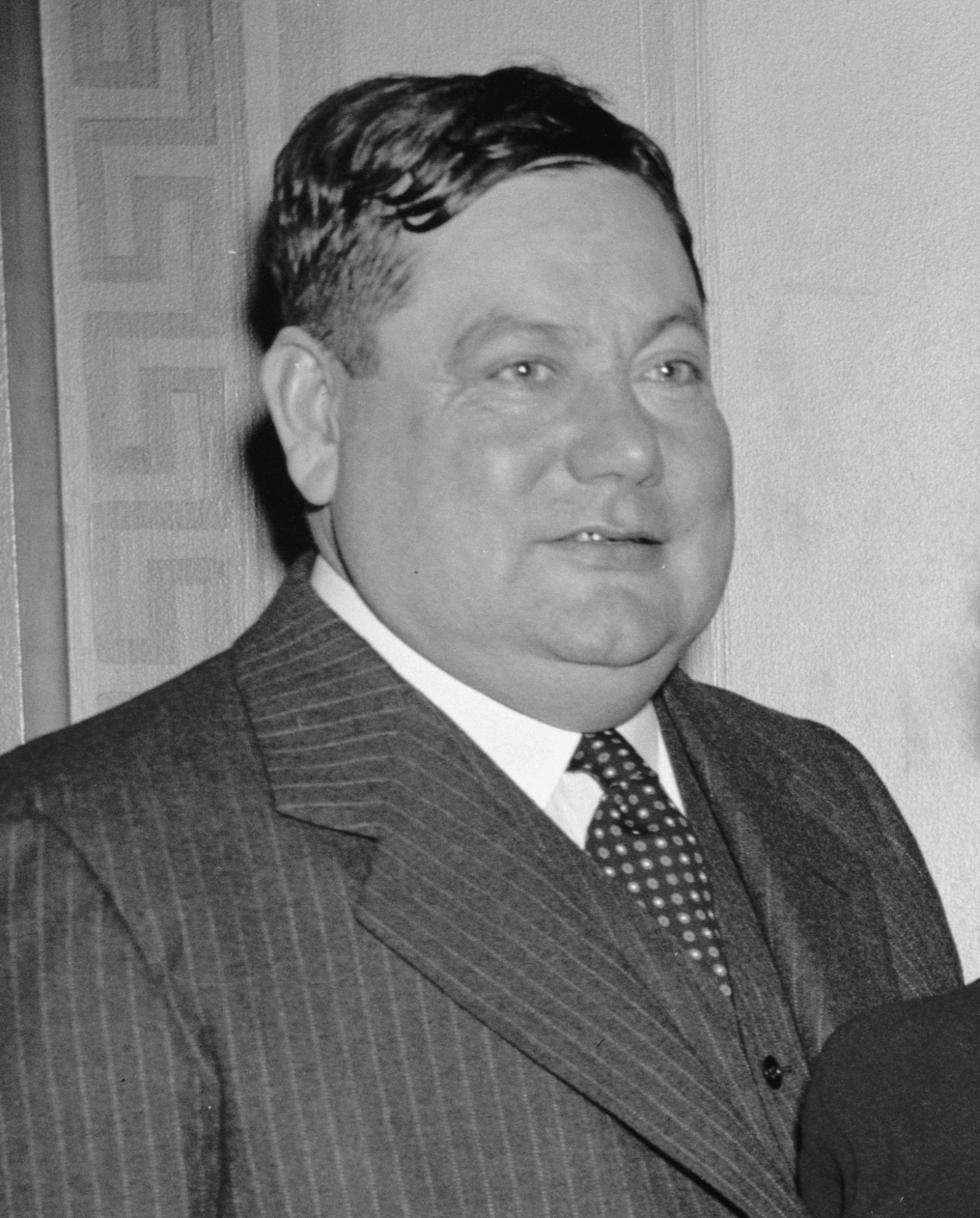

Member of the U.S. House of Representatives from Ohio's at-large district
- In office January 3, 1939 – January 3, 1941
- Preceded by: John McSweeney; Harold G. Mosier
- Succeeded by: George H. Bender; Stephen M. Young

Member of the Ohio Senate
- In office 1923-1935

Member of the Ohio House of Representatives
- In office 1921-1922

Personal details
- Born: July 9, 1888 Bucyrus, Ohio
- Died: January 12, 1958 (aged 69) Aurora, Ohio
- Resting place: Lake View Cemetery, Cleveland
- Party: Republican
- Education: Ohio Wesleyan University; Western Reserve University School of Law

Lycurgus Luther Marshall (July 9, 1888 – January 12, 1958) was an American lawyer and politician who served one term as a U.S. representative from Ohio from 1939 to 1941.

== Biography ==
Born in Bucyrus, Ohio, Marshall attended the public schools, and graduated from Ohio Wesleyan University, Delaware, Ohio, in 1909 and from the law department of Western Reserve University, Cleveland, Ohio, in 1915. He was admitted to the bar in 1915 and commenced practice in Cleveland, Ohio.

=== Political career ===
He served as member of the Ohio House of Representatives in 1921 and 1922, and in the Ohio State Senate from 1923 to 1935. He also served as member of the Euclid (Ohio) School Board for eight years.

Marshall was elected as a Republican to the Seventy-sixth Congress (January 3, 1939 – January 3, 1941). He was an unsuccessful candidate for reelection in 1940 to the Seventy-seventh Congress, and thereafter resumed the practice of law.

=== Death ===
He died in Aurora, Ohio, January 12, 1958, and was interred in Lake View Cemetery, Cleveland, Ohio.

== Sources ==
- United States Congress. "L. L. Marshall (id: M000159)". Biographical Directory of the United States Congress.

U.S. House of Representatives
Preceded by Harold G. Mosier	Member of the U.S. House of Representatives from Ohio's at-large congressional district 1939-1941	Succeeded by Stephen M. Young
