= Harold G. Mosier =

American politician

Harold Gerard Mosier
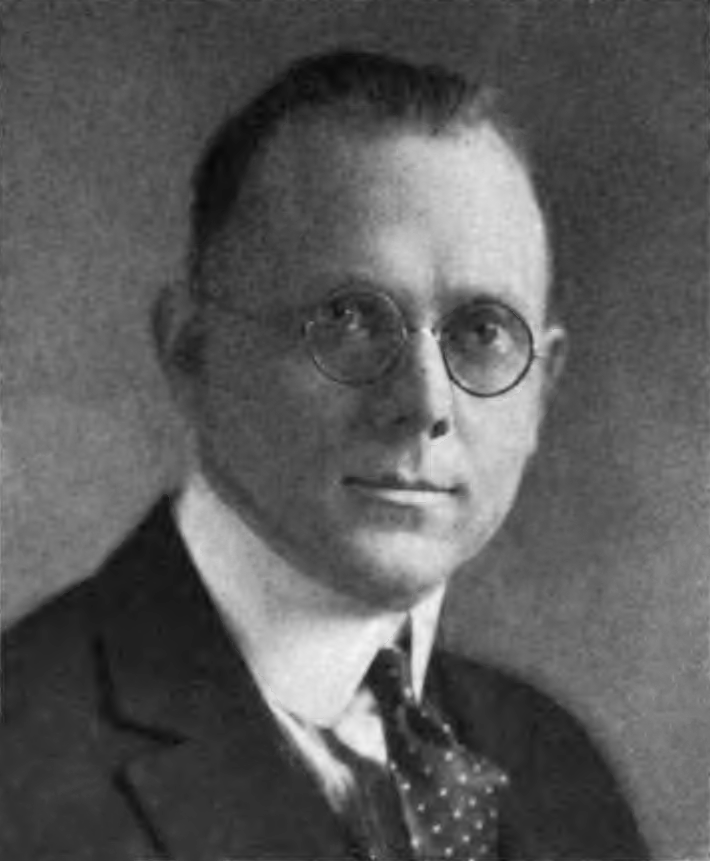
- circa 1921

Member of the U.S. House of Representatives from Ohio's at-large district
- In office January 3, 1937 – January 3, 1939 Serving with John McSweeney
- Preceded by: Daniel S. Earhart; Stephen M. Young
- Succeeded by: George H. Bender; L. L. Marshall

45th Lieutenant Governor of Ohio
- In office January 14, 1935 – January 11, 1937
- Governor: Martin L. Davey
- Preceded by: Charles W. Sawyer
- Succeeded by: Paul P. Yoder

Member of the Ohio Senate
- In office 1933–1935

Personal details
- Born: July 24, 1889 Cincinnati, Ohio
- Died: August 7, 1971 (aged 82) Washington, D.C.
- Resting place: Fort Lincoln Cemetery
- Party: Democratic
- Spouse: Grace Hoyt Jones
- Education: Dartmouth College; Harvard Law School

Harold Gerard Mosier (July 24, 1889 – August 7, 1971) was an American lawyer and politician who served as a U.S. representative from Ohio for one term from 1937 to 1939. He was also the 45th lieutenant governor of Ohio from 1935 to 1937.

== Early life and career ==
Mosier was born in Cincinnati, Ohio. He attended East High School in Cleveland, Ohio. He was graduated from Dartmouth College, Hanover, New Hampshire, in 1912 and from the law department of Harvard University in 1915. He was admitted to the bar in 1916 and commenced practice in Cleveland.

Mosier married Grace Hoyt Jones of Columbus, Ohio, April 20, 1918.

== Political career ==
He served as a member of the Ohio Senate 1933-1935 and was the lieutenant governor of Ohio 1935–1937.

=== Congress ===
Mosier was elected as a Democrat to the Seventy-fifth Congress (January 3, 1937 – January 3, 1939). He sat on the Dies Committee. He was an unsuccessful candidate for renomination in 1938. He resumed the practice of law in Cleveland, Baltimore, and Washington, D.C. He was Counsel to Glenn L. Martin Co. and the Aircraft Industries Association. He retired in 1961.

== Death ==
He resided in Washington, D.C., until his death there on August 7, 1971. He was interred in Fort Lincoln Cemetery.

== See also ==
- List of members of the House Un-American Activities Committee

== Sources ==
- United States Congress. "Harold G. Mosier (id: M001032)". Biographical Directory of the United States Congress.

Political offices
Preceded by Charles W. Sawyer	Lieutenant Governor of Ohio; 1935–1937	Succeeded by Paul P. Yoder
U.S. House of Representatives
Preceded by Stephen M. Young	Member of the U.S. House of Representatives from Ohio's at-large congressional district 1937-1939	Succeeded by L. L. Marshall
