= Ryan Neal (politician) =

American politician (born 1972)

47th Mayor of Beckley
- Incumbent
- Assumed office July 1, 2024
- Preceded by: Rob Rappold

Personal details
- Born: August 3, 1972 (age 54) Beckley, West Virginia, U.S.
- Education: West Virginia University
- Occupation: Business owner; politician

Ryan Neal (born August 3, 1972) is an American politician and small business owner serving as the 47th mayor of Beckley, West Virginia since July 1, 2024.

== Early life and education ==
Neal was born and raised in Beckley, West Virginia. He attended local public schools and graduated from Woodrow Wilson High School in 1990. He pursued higher education at West Virginia University (WVU), earning his degree in 1995.

== Career ==
Following a ten-year period living in Roanoke, Virginia, Neal returned to Beckley and became a prominent fixture in the local business community. For over a decade, he owned and operated corporate retail franchises, most notably running the Beef Jerky Outlet location on Harper Road in Beckley.

=== Mayor of Beckley, West Virginia (2024–present) ===
A political newcomer, Neal entered the mayoral race after two-term incumbent Mayor Rob Rappold announced he would not seek re-election. Running on a platform focused on community revitalization, economic growth, and utilizing a business-minded approach to governance, Neal campaigned heavily throughout the city.

In the primary election held on May 14, 2024, Neal secured a decisive victory in a five-candidate field. He captured over 40 percent of the total vote (1,485 votes), defeating his closest opponent, attorney and former council member Robert Dunlap, by more than 500 votes. He is the first mayor to transition into Beckley's new city manager style of government.

Neal was officially sworn into office by Raleigh County Circuit Judge Darl W. Poling on July 1, 2024. His administration coincided with a historical restructuring of Beckley's municipal charter. Moving away from a century-old "strong mayor" system, the city implemented a Council–manager framework. Under this system, administrative authority is delegated to an appointed city manager. As mayor, Neal functions as the head of the Common Council, managing legislative meetings and serving as the public face of the city.

Neal has overseen multiple managerial transitions, working initially with interim manager Billie Trump and subsequently appointing interim manager Phil Jarrell in February 2025.

In 2026, Neal initiated public town halls to address local panhandling concerns, balancing business interests with community outreach initiatives. Under his council leadership, the Beckley Police Department also secured federal grant funding to purchase specialized policing equipment, including drones and tactical pursuit safety systems.

He is ordered as the 47th mayor of Beckley (excluding A.K. Minter's three consecutive terms, 1938–1943).

== See also ==
- List of mayors of Beckley, West Virginia
