= 1804 United States House of Representatives election in Ohio =

1804 Ohio United States House of Representatives election
- October 9, 1804
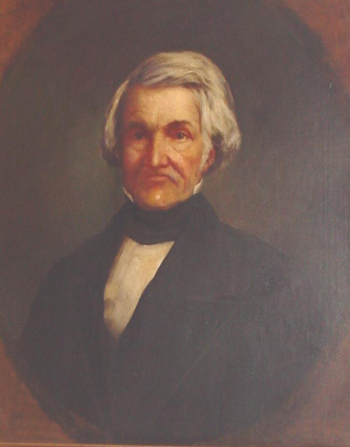

Nominee	Jeremiah Morrow	Elias Langham
Party	Democratic-Republican	Federalist
Popular vote	4,101	1,718
Percentage	70.2%	29.4%
Representative before election
Jeremiah Morrow
Democratic-Republican
Elected Representative
Jeremiah Morrow
Democratic-Republican

Incumbent, Democratic-Republican Jeremiah Morrow won the general election held on October 9, 1804 with 70 percent of the votes.

== Results ==
1804 United States House of Representatives election in Ohio
Party	Candidate	Votes	%
Democratic-Republican	Jeremiah Morrow (incumbent)	4,101	70.20%
Federalist	Elias Langham	1,718	29.41%
Democratic-Republican	Rufus Putnam	23	0.39%
Total votes		5,842	100.0%
Democratic-Republican hold			

District	Incumbent	Party	First elected	Result	Candidates
Ohio at-large	Jeremiah Morrow	Democratic-Republican	1803	Incumbent re-elected.	√ Jeremiah Morrow (Democratic-Republican) 70.2% Elias Langham (Federalist) 29.4% Rufus Putnam 0.4%

== See also ==
- United States House of Representatives elections, 1804 and 1805
- List of United States representatives from Ohio
