= Senator Yoder =

Senator Yoder may refer to:

- John C. Yoder (1951–2017), West Virginia State Senate
- Paul P. Yoder (1897–1965), Ohio State Senate
