= Darl =

Darl is a masculine given name. Notable people with this name include:

== Real people ==
- Darl Douglas (born 1979), Surinamese footballer
- Darl McBride (1959–2024), American entrepreneur
- Darl W. Poling (born 1962), American judge

== Fictional characters ==
- Darl Bundren, a character from the 1930 novel As I Lay Dying by William Faulkner

== See also ==
- Darl., taxonomic author abbreviation for William Darlington (1782–1863)
