= Charles V. Truax =

American politician (1887–1935)

Charles Vilas Truax
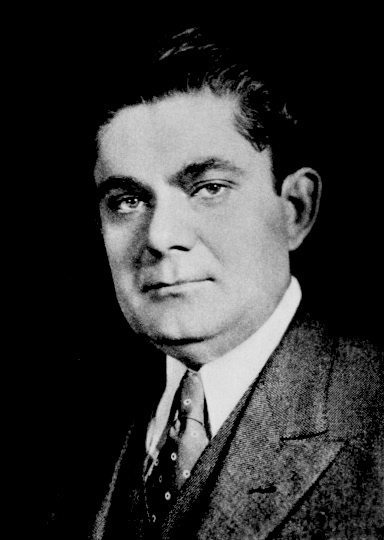
- Frontispiece of 1936's Charles Vilas Truax, Late a Representative

Member of the U.S. House of Representatives from Ohio's at-large district
- In office March 4, 1933 – August 9, 1935
- Preceded by: inactive
- Succeeded by: Daniel S. Earhart

Personal details
- Born: February 1, 1887 Sycamore, Ohio, US
- Died: August 9, 1935 (aged 48) Washington, D.C., US
- Resting place: Pleasant View Cemetery, Sycamore, Ohio
- Party: Democratic

Charles Vilas Truax (February 1, 1887 – August 9, 1935) was an American politician who served one term as a U.S. representative from Ohio from 1933 to 1935.

== Biography ==
Born on a farm near Sycamore, Ohio, Truax attended the public schools and graduated from Sycamore High School. He engaged in the implement business, and afterward, in agricultural pursuits. He was editor of the Swine World magazine from 1916 to 1921. He was appointed director of agriculture of Ohio by Governor A. Victor Donahey in 1923 and served until 1929. He was an unsuccessful candidate for election to the United States Senate in 1928. He engaged in the life insurance business in Columbus, Ohio, in 1928. He was elected as a Democrat to the Seventy-third and Seventy-fourth Congresses and served from March 4, 1933, until his death in Washington, D.C., August 9, 1935. He was interred in Pleasant View Cemetery, Sycamore, Ohio.

== See also ==
- List of members of the United States Congress who died in office (1900–1949)

== Sources ==
- United States Congress. "Charles V. Truax (id: T000386)". Biographical Directory of the United States Congress.
- "Charles V. Truax". Ohio History Central.

Party political offices
Preceded by Atlee Pomerene	Democratic nominee for U.S. Senator from Ohio (Class 1); 1928	Succeeded by A. Victor Donahey
U.S. House of Representatives
Preceded by District re-established	Member of the U.S. House of Representatives from Ohio's at-large congressional district 1933-1935	Succeeded by Daniel S. Earhart
