= 1956 United States Senate election in Ohio =

- November 6, 1956
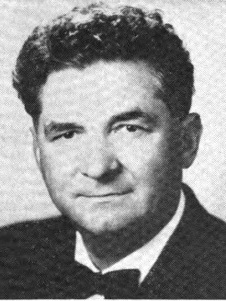

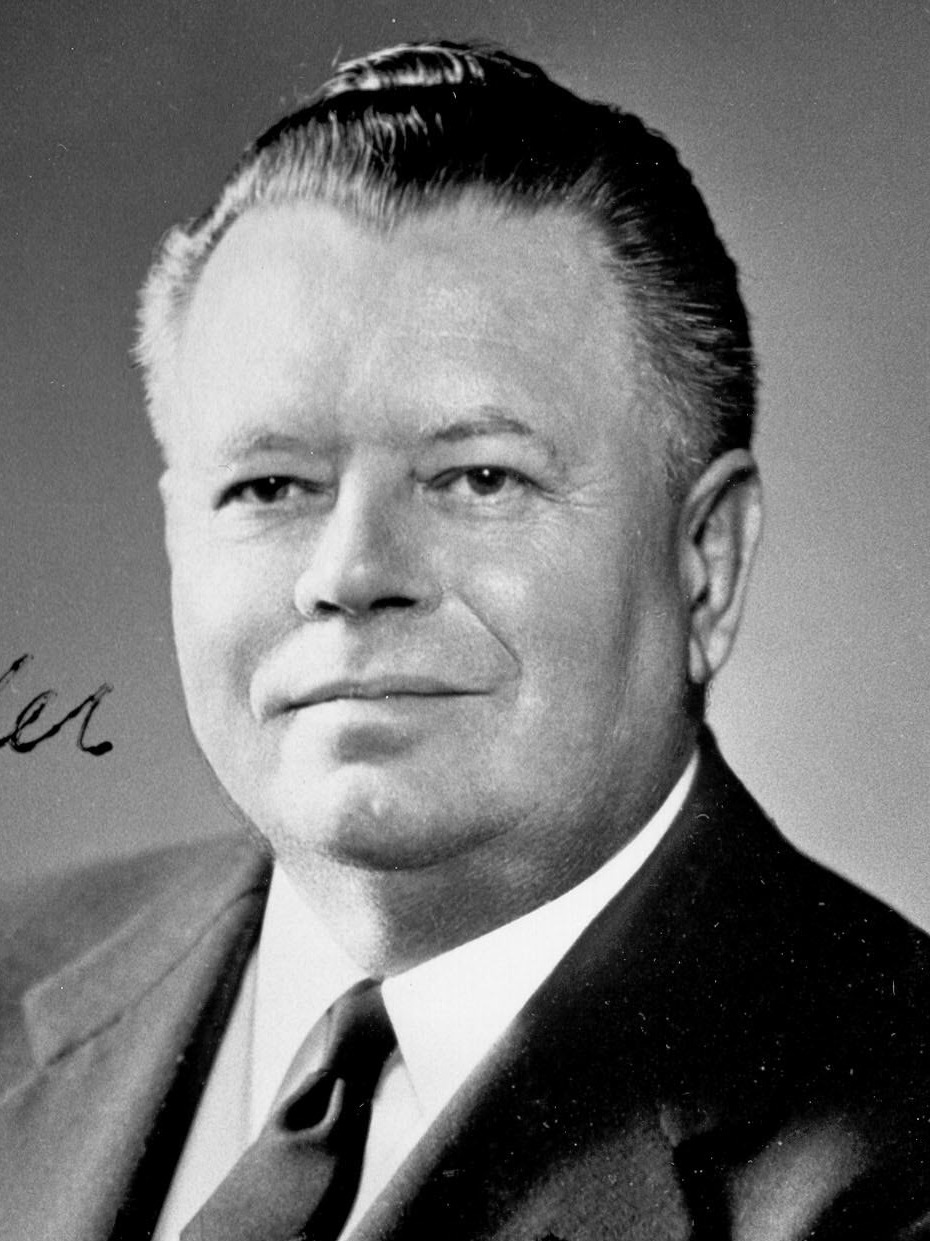
Nominee	Frank Lausche	George H. Bender
Party	Democratic	Republican
Popular vote	1,864,589	1,660,910
Percentage	52.89%	47.11%
- County results Lausche: 50–60% 60–70% Bender: 50–60% 60–70%
U.S. senator before election
George H. Bender
Republican
Elected U.S. Senator
Frank J. Lausche
Democratic

The 1956 United States Senate election in Ohio took place on November 6, 1956. Incumbent Senator George H. Bender, who won a special election to complete the term of the late Senator Robert A. Taft, ran for re-election to a full six-year term. He was defeated by Democratic Governor Frank Lausche.

== Campaign ==
The Ohio U.S. Senate race was one of the key races of 1956. In a year in which the Republicans expected to make sweeping gains in Congress due to Eisenhower's coattails, the race in Ohio was a key example of how short the President's coattails actually were.

Bender had been elected to complete the term of Senator Robert Taft just two years earlier in a good Democratic year. He had a moderate conservative voting record in the Senate.

The strongest Democratic candidate in early 1956 appeared to be Gov. Lausche. The governor, a moderate who had always campaigned without seeking the support of labor leaders and who had generally ignored Ohio Democratic leaders as well, had always been an enigma.

During the campaign, the two candidates appeared to agree on more issues than they disagreed. Lausche had managed to avoid discussing his differences with Adlai Stevenson in the campaign until the Lausche-Bender debate on 10/27/1956. In that debate, Bender got Lausche to admit that he did not support Stevenson's military or foreign policy proposals. Lausche also stated that if his vote would determine control of the Senate in 1957, he would vote to organize a Republican Senate.

The race was marked by unusual characteristics. Bender received the endorsement of labor leaders, who usually supported Democrats. Lausche received the support of moderate Republicans who wanted to steer left of the Republican leadership in Congress. Furthermore, the Ohio legislature worked inadvertently against Bender. Republican leaders had passed a law eliminating the box for straight ticket voting in the 1940s after the Roosevelt and Truman victories swept Democrats into office in close races. In this case, such a box for straight-ticket voting would undoubtedly have helped Bender.

In the few polls taken in 1956, Lausche maintained a narrow lead over Bender going into the election. One Democratic political insider, reflecting the disaffection of Ohio Democratic leaders with Lausche, told the New York Times "Nobody likes Lausche except the people."

Although election day was cloudy, with rain in the afternoon, Ohio had a record turnout. The voters narrowly chose Gov. Lausche over Bender, helping the Democrats maintain their narrow margin in the Senate. As the Republicans had feared, the lack of the "straight ticket" box hurt Bender. Voters cast 200,000 more votes in the presidential race than the senate race.

== General election ==
=== Candidates ===
- George H. Bender, incumbent Senator since 1954 (Republican)
- Frank J. Lausche, Governor of Ohio (1945–1947 and since 1949) (Democratic)

=== Results ===
1956 United States Senate election in Ohio
Party	Candidate	Votes	%	±%
Democratic	Frank Lausche	1,864,589	52.89%	▲2.95
Republican	George H. Bender (incumbent)	1,660,910	47.11%	▼2.95
Total votes		3,525,499	100.0%	

== See also ==
- 1956 United States Senate elections
