= 1928 United States Senate election in Ohio =

- November 6, 1928
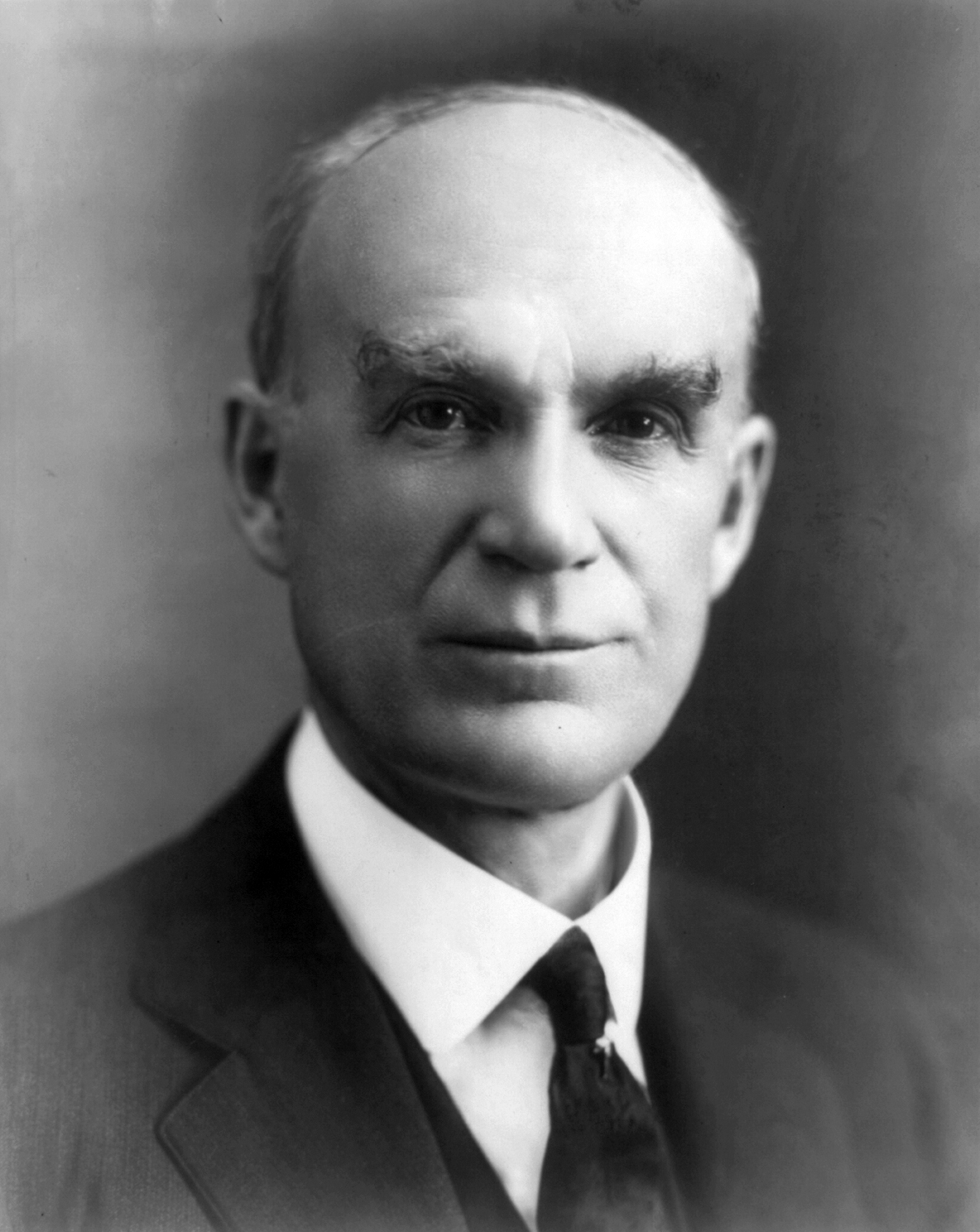

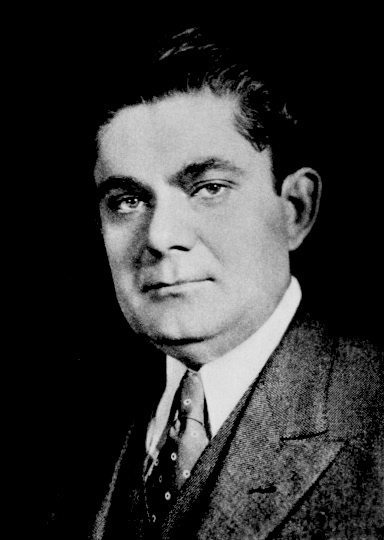
Nominee	Simeon Fess	Charles Truax
Party	Republican	Democratic
Popular vote	1,412,805	908,952
Percentage	60.73%	39.07%
- County results Fess: 50–60% 60–70% 70–80% Truax: 50–60% 60–70%
U.S. senator before election
Simeon Fess
Republican
Elected U.S. Senator
Simeon Fess
Republican

The 1928 United States Senate election in Ohio took place on November 6, 1928. Incumbent Republican Senator Simeon Fess was re-elected to a second term in office over Democratic Director of Agriculture Charles Truax.

== General election ==
=== Candidates ===
- Simeon Fess, incumbent Senator since 1923 (Republican)
- James Goward (Socialist Labor)
- J. Wetherell Hutton, Quaker schoolmaster (Prohibition)
- Charles Truax, Ohio Director of Agriculture (Democratic)
- Joseph Willnecker (Workers)

=== Results ===
1928 U.S. Senate election in Ohio
Party	Candidate	Votes	%	±%
Republican	Simeon Fess (incumbent)	1,412,805	60.73%	▲9.83
Democratic	Charles Truax	908,952	39.07%	▼8.65
Communist	Joseph Willnecker	2,061	0.09%	N/A
Socialist Labor	James Goward	1,384	0.06%	N/A
Prohibition	J. Wetherell Hutton	1,003	0.04%	N/A
Total votes		2,326,205	100.00%	
Republican hold				

== See also ==
- 1928 United States Senate elections
