= 1942 Ohio gubernatorial election =

- November 3, 1942
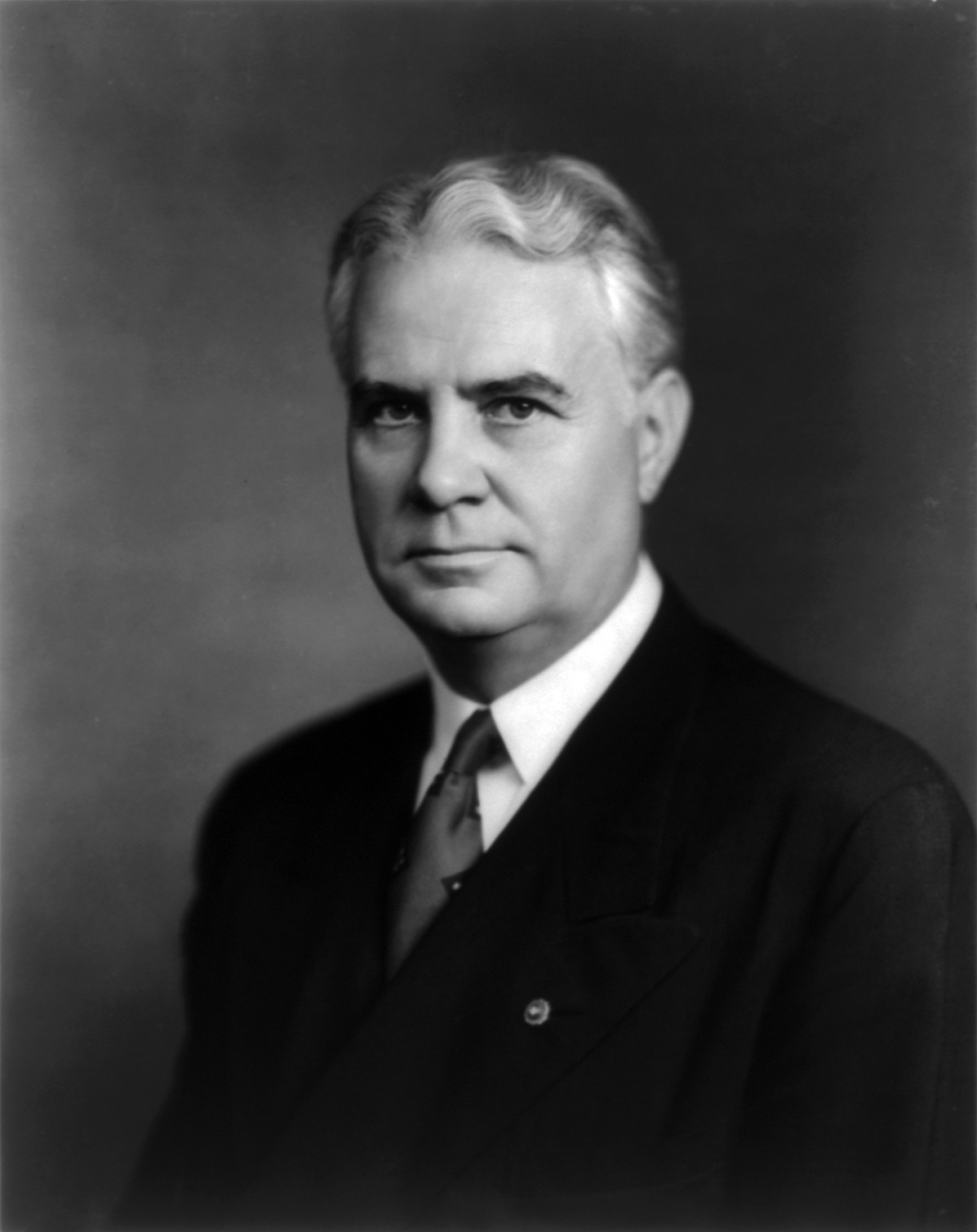

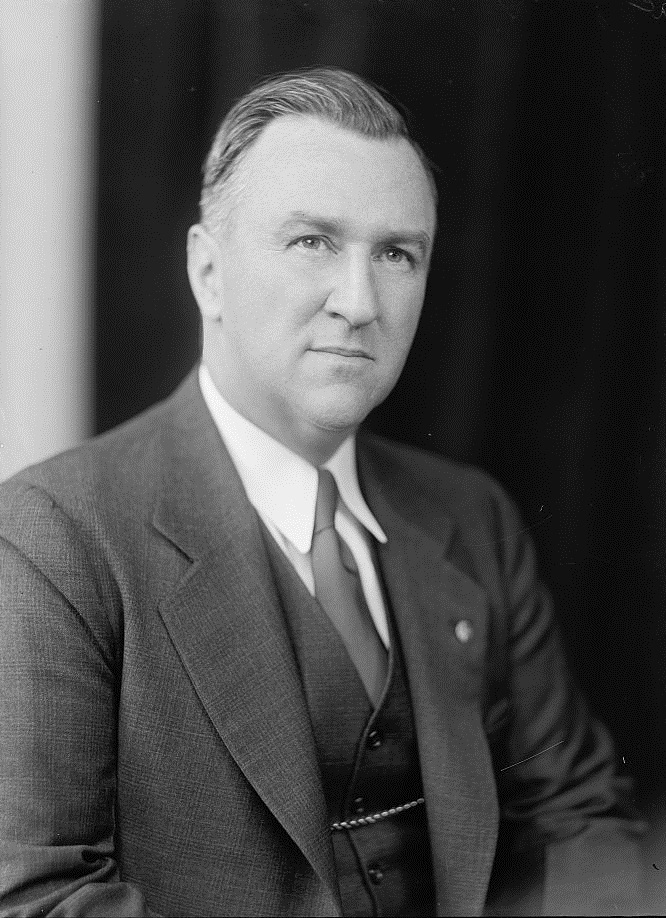
Nominee	John W. Bricker	John McSweeney
Party	Republican	Democratic
Popular vote	1,086,937	709,599
Percentage	60.50%	39.50%
- County results Bricker: 50–60% 60–70% 70–80% McSweeney: 50–60% 60–70%
Governor before election
John W. Bricker
Republican
Elected Governor
John W. Bricker
Republican

The 1942 Ohio gubernatorial election was held on November 3, 1942. Incumbent Republican John W. Bricker defeated Democratic nominee John McSweeney with 60.50% of the vote.

== Primary elections ==
Primary elections were held on August 11, 1942.

=== Democratic primary ===
==== Candidates ====
- John McSweeney, former U.S. Representative
- Joseph T. Ferguson, Ohio State Auditor
- Clarence H. Knisley
- Walter F. Heer
- Frank A. Dye

==== Results ====
Democratic primary results
Party	Candidate	Votes	%
Democratic	John McSweeney	119,698	37.56
Democratic	Joseph T. Ferguson	101,508	31.86
Democratic	Clarence H. Knisley	44,178	13.86
Democratic	Walter F. Heer	41,633	13.07
Democratic	Frank A. Dye	11,630	3.65
Total votes		318,647	100.00

=== Republican primary ===
==== Candidates ====
- John W. Bricker, incumbent Governor

==== Results ====
Republican primary results
Party	Candidate	Votes	%
Republican	John W. Bricker (incumbent)	350,730	100.00
Total votes		350,730	100.00

== General election ==
=== Candidates ===
- John W. Bricker, Republican
- John McSweeney, Democratic

=== Results ===
1942 Ohio gubernatorial election
Party	Candidate	Votes	%	±%
Republican	John W. Bricker (incumbent)	1,086,937	60.50%	
Democratic	John McSweeney	709,599	39.50%	
Majority				
Turnout				
Republican hold		Swing		
