= Daniel S. Earhart =

American politician

Daniel Scofield Earhart
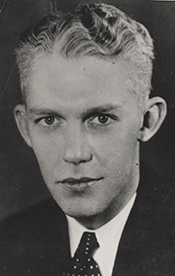

Member of the U.S. House of Representatives from Ohio's at-large district
- In office November 3, 1936 – January 3, 1937 Serving with Stephen M. Young
- Preceded by: Charles V. Truax; Stephen M. Young
- Succeeded by: John McSweeney; Harold G. Mosier

Personal details
- Born: May 28, 1907 Columbus, Ohio, U.S.
- Died: January 2, 1976 (aged 68) Columbus, Ohio, U.S.
- Resting place: Green Lawn Cemetery
- Party: Democratic

Daniel Scofield Earhart (May 28, 1907 – January 2, 1976) was an American lawyer who served as a U.S. representative from Ohio for two months from November 1936 to January 1937. He later served on active duty in both World War II and the Korean War.

== Early life and career ==
Born in Columbus, Ohio, May 28, 1907, Earhart attended the public schools, and the College of Engineering of Ohio State University at Columbus. He was graduated from the Moritz College of Law, Ohio State University, in 1928. He was admitted to the bar the same year and commenced practice in Columbus, Ohio.

== Special election and Congress ==
Earhart was elected as a Democrat to the Seventy-fourth Congress to fill the vacancy caused by the death of Charles V. Truax and served from November 3, 1936, to January 3, 1937.

== Later career ==
He was not a candidate for election in 1936 to the Seventy-fifth Congress and resumed the practice of law.

=== Military service ===
He served as member of the Officers' Reserve Corps 1928–1941. Ordered to active service in the Infantry with rank of captain on May 26, 1941. Transferred to the Army Air Forces with rank of major. He was promoted to lieutenant colonel and was relieved of active duty on February 24, 1946. Commissioned lieutenant colonel in the Ohio Air National Guard in 1948. Recalled to active Federal military service September 2, 1951, and served until September 7, 1953, as commanding officer, deputy commander, and operations officer of the One Hundred and Fifty-fifth Tactical Control Group, United States Air Force, building up NATO tactical air control facilities in western Europe.

== Retirement and death ==
After leaving the military, he returned to Columbus, Ohio, where resumed the practice of law.

He died there on January 2, 1976. Cremated. Ashes interred in Green Lawn Cemetery.

== Sources ==
- United States Congress. "Daniel S. Earhart (id: E000006)". Biographical Directory of the United States Congress.

U.S. House of Representatives
| Preceded by District re-established | Member of the U.S. House of Representatives from Ohio's at-large congressional district 1936-1937 | Succeeded by John McSweeney |
