= 1808 United States House of Representatives election in Ohio =

In October 1808, Jeremiah Morrow was re-elected to represent the state of Ohio in the United States Congress. Morrow received 1249 votes, while his challenger Philemon Beecher received 425 votes.

District	Incumbent			This race	
District	Representative	Party	First elected	Results	Candidates
Ohio at-large	Jeremiah Morrow	Democratic-Republican	1803	Incumbent re-elected.	√ Jeremiah Morrow (Democratic-Republican) 71.5% Philemon Beecher (Federalist) 28.5%

== See also ==
- United States House of Representatives elections, 1808 and 1809
- List of United States representatives from Ohio
