= List of mayors of Beckley, West Virginia =

Mayor of Beckley, West Virginia
- Incumbent; Ryan Neal since 2024
- Formation: 1872
- First holder: John Beckley (1872, 1884 - 1896)
- Website: Mayor's Office

This is a list of mayors of Beckley, West Virginia, United States of America.

== Mayors ==
=== Pre strong mayor format ===
Here's the list sorted by year:

- John Beckley, 1872 & 1884-1896 (Founder of Beckley)
- Thaddeus K. Scott, 1891
- Robert T. Willis, 1893
- Thaddeus K. Scott, 1894
- Capt. John W. Anderson, 1897
- John Wallace McCreery, 1898–1899
- J. E. Summerfield, 1900
- John Wallace McCreery, 1901
- George A. Cook, 1901
- A. D. Preston, 1902
- John H. Hatcher, 1903
- Ashton File, 1904
- Joe L. Smith, 1906
- Hugh A. Dunn, 1907
- Joe L. Smith, 1908-1909
- Lucien Hereford Davis, 1910–1911
- Thomas H. Wickham, 1911
- M. L. Painter, 1912–1913
- Dr. W. W. Watts, 1914–1915
- Hugh A. Davis, 1916–1917
- Herbert A. Stansbury, 1918–1919
- Dr. J. A. Campbell, 1920–1921
- C. V. Cottle, 1922–1923
- Herbert A. Stansbury, 1924–1925
- J. Hugh Miller, 1926–1927
- Joe L. Smith, 1928-1929
- George W. Bair Jr., 1929
- Cyrus H. Meador, 1930–1931
- Grover C. Hedrick, 1932–1933
- A. Z. Lilly, 1934–1935
- Robert Wriston, 1936–1937
- A. K. Minter, 1938–1939
- A. K. Minter, 1940–1941
- A. K. Minter, 1942–1943
- Robert Wriston, 1944–1945
- Walter A. E. Burke, 1946–1947
- Grover C. Hedrick, 1948–1949
- Walter A. E. Burke, 1950–1951
- George Chambers, 1952–1953
- Elmer L. Davis, 1954–1955
- A. K. Minter, 1956–1959
- Cecil Miller, 1959–1963
- John Wesley Smith, 1963–1970
- John Howard McCulloch, 1970–1982
- Charles F. Shoemaker, 1983–1987
- Emmett S. Pugh III, 1988–2013
- William A. O'Brien, 2014–2016
- Robert Rappold, 2016–2024
- Ryan Neal, 2024–present

== See also ==
- Beckley, West Virginia
