= John McSweeney (Ohio politician) =

American politician

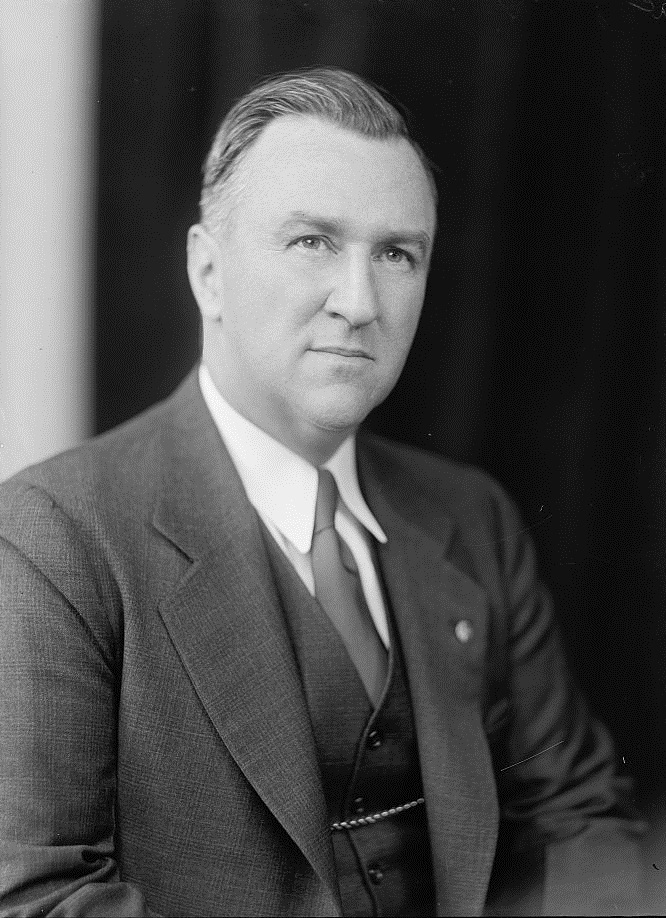

Member of the U.S. House of Representatives from Ohio
- In office March 4, 1923 – March 3, 1929
- Preceded by: Joseph H. Himes
- Succeeded by: Charles B. McClintock
- Constituency: 16th district
- In office January 3, 1937 – January 3, 1939 Serving with Harold G. Mosier
- Preceded by: Daniel S. Earhart; Stephen M. Young
- Succeeded by: George H. Bender; L. L. Marshall
- Constituency: At-large
- In office January 3, 1949 – January 3, 1951
- Preceded by: Henderson H. Carson
- Succeeded by: Frank T. Bow
- Constituency: 16th district

Personal details
- Born: John McSweeney; December 19, 1890 Wooster, Ohio, U.S.
- Died: December 13, 1969 (aged 78) Wooster, Ohio, U.S.
- Resting place: Wooster Cemetery
- Party: Democratic
- Education: College of Wooster

John McSweeney (December 19, 1890 – December 13, 1969) was an American lawyer and politician who served as a U.S. representative from Ohio in the 20th century.

== Biography ==
Born in Wooster, Ohio, McSweeney attended the public schools and was graduated from Wooster University in 1912. He was employed in the engineering corps of the Pennsylvania Railroad Co. in 1912 and 1913. He taught at Wooster High School 1913–1917. He served overseas during the First World War from May 10, 1917, to August 11, 1919, and was promoted to captain and aide-de-camp to General Farnsworth on August 16, 1918. Awarded the Purple Heart Medal and received the Croix de Guerre. He studied law at the Inns of Court, England. He returned to the United States in 1919 and resumed teaching. He served as member of the Wooster City Council 1919–1921 and served as president. He was an unsuccessful candidate for election in 1920 to the Sixty-seventh Congress. He was admitted to the bar in 1925 and commenced practice in Wooster.

=== Congress ===
McSweeney was elected as a Democrat to the Sixty-eighth, Sixty-ninth, and Seventieth Congresses (March 4, 1923 – March 3, 1929). He was an unsuccessful candidate for reelection in 1928 to the Seventy-first Congress. He resumed the practice of law in Wooster. State director of public welfare 1931–1935.

McSweeney was elected to the Seventy-fifth Congress (January 3, 1937 – January 3, 1939). He was an unsuccessful candidate for reelection in 1938 to the Seventy-sixth Congress. He was an unsuccessful Democratic candidate for election to the United States Senate in 1940 and for election as Governor of Ohio in 1942. He served as a lieutenant colonel with the Military Government in Italy 1943–1946.

He resumed the practice of law.

McSweeney was elected to the Eighty-first Congress (January 3, 1949 – January 3, 1951). He was an unsuccessful candidate for reelection in 1950 to the Eighty-second Congress, for election in 1952 to the Eighty-third Congress, and in 1956 to the Eighty-fifth Congress.

== Death and burial ==
He resided in Wooster, Ohio, until his death there December 13, 1969. He was interred in Wooster Cemetery.

== See also ==
- List of members of the House Un-American Activities Committee

== Sources ==
- United States Congress. "John McSweeney (id: M000606)". Biographical Directory of the United States Congress.

U.S. House of Representatives
Preceded by Joseph H. Himes	Member of the U.S. House of Representatives from Ohio's 16th congressional district 1923–1929	Succeeded by Charles B. McClintock
Preceded by Daniel S. Earhart	Member of the U.S. House of Representatives from Ohio's at-large congressional district 1937–1939	Succeeded by George H. Bender
Preceded by Henderson H. Carson	Member of the U.S. House of Representatives from Ohio's 16th congressional district 1949–1951	Succeeded by Frank T. Bow
Party political offices
Preceded by A. Victor Donahey	Democratic nominee for U.S. Senator from Ohio (Class 1); 1940	Succeeded by Henry P. Webber
Preceded by Martin L. Davey	Democratic Party nominee for Governor of Ohio; 1942	Succeeded by Frank Lausche
