= Paul P. Yoder =

American politician (1897–1965)

46th Lieutenant Governor of Ohio
- In office January 11, 1937 – January 9, 1939
- Governor: Martin L. Davey
- Preceded by: Harold G. Mosier
- Succeeded by: Paul M. Herbert

Personal details
- Born: Paul Price Yoder; June 25, 1897 West Liberty, Ohio, U.S.
- Died: September 1, 1965 (aged 68) Fayetteville, North Carolina, U.S.
- Resting place: Dayton National Cemetery, Dayton, Ohio, U.S.
- Party: Democratic
- Spouse: Martha Celestine Byers

Paul Price Yoder (June 25, 1897 – September 1, 1965) was an American politician who served as the 46th lieutenant governor of Ohio from 1937 to 1939. He died of cancer in a North Carolina veterans' hospital in 1965.

Political offices
| Preceded by Harold G. Mosier | Lieutenant Governor of Ohio; 1937–1939 | Succeeded by Paul M. Herbert |
