= Stephen M. Young =

American politician (1889–1984)

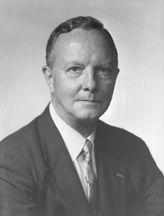
- Young, c. 1959

United States Senator from Ohio
- In office January 3, 1959 – January 3, 1971
- Preceded by: John W. Bricker
- Succeeded by: Robert Taft Jr.

Member of the U.S. House of Representatives from Ohio's at-large district
- In office March 4, 1933 – January 3, 1937
- Preceded by: District established
- Succeeded by: Harold G. Mosier; John McSweeney
- In office January 3, 1941 – January 3, 1943
- Preceded by: George H. Bender; L. L. Marshall
- Succeeded by: George H. Bender
- In office January 3, 1949 – January 3, 1951
- Preceded by: George H. Bender
- Succeeded by: George H. Bender

Member of the Ohio House of Representatives
- In office January 1913 – January 1917

Personal details
- Born: Stephen Marvin Young; May 4, 1889 Norwalk, Ohio, U.S.
- Died: December 1, 1984 (aged 95) Washington, D.C., U.S
- Resting place: Norwalk Cemetery, Norwalk, Ohio
- Party: Democratic
- Spouse(s): Ruby L. Dawley (died 1952); Rachel L. Bell (died 1982)
- Children: 2
- Education: Case Western Reserve University (LLB)

Military service
- Branch/service: United States Army
- Rank: Lieutenant Colonel
- Battles/wars: World War I Mexican Border War; World War II
- Awards: Bronze Star; Order of the Crown of Italy

Stephen Marvin Young (May 4, 1889 – December 1, 1984) was an American lawyer and politician who served as a United States senator from Ohio from 1959 to 1971. A member of the Democratic Party, Young also served in the U.S. House of Representatives during the 73rd, 74th, 77th, and 81st congresses. He was a veteran of the Mexican Border War, World War I, and World War II, where he served as the Allied Military Governor of the Italian Province of Reggio Emilia in 1945.

== Early life and education ==
Young was born on May 4, 1889, in Norwalk, Ohio, the fourth and youngest child of Stephen Marvin Young and Isabella Margaret Wagner. He and his father (who was a judge in Huron County) were namesakes of his great-grandfather, Stephen Marvin (1797–1868), the first pioneer of Shelby, Ohio. He attended Kenyon College and later received a law degree from Adelbert College of Western Reserve University in 1911.

== Career ==
Young served in the Ohio House of Representatives from 1913 to 1917, and as an assistant prosecutor of Cuyahoga County, Ohio, from 1917 to 1918. During the World War I era, he served in the U.S. Army in field artillery. In 1919, he returned to the Cuyahoga County prosecutor's office.

In 1922, Young ran for the office of attorney general of Ohio. He won the Democratic nomination, but lost in the general election to Charles Crabbe, garnering 744,693 votes to Crabbe's 780,192. In 1930, he ran for the Democratic nomination for governor of Ohio but lost in the Democratic primary to former Representative George White, who went on to win the governorship.

From 1931 to 1932, Young served on the Ohio Commission on Unemployment Insurance. In 1932, Young was elected to one of Ohio's two at-large seats in the U.S. House of Representatives. He was re-elected to his seat in 1934. In 1936, instead of running for re-election to the House, Young ran for governor of Ohio again. This time, he lost the Democratic primary to incumbent governor Martin Davey, who succeeded George White (against whom Young had run in 1930). From 1937 to 1939, Young served as special counsel to the attorney general of Ohio.

In 1938, Young again sought election to an at-large seat in the U.S. House of Representatives, but he and fellow Democrat John McSweeney were defeated by two Republicans, George H. Bender and L. L. Marshall. In 1940, Young was again elected to one of the at-large House seats; Bender retained the other. Losing that race were Marshall and Democrat Francis W. Durbin. In 1942, Ohio was reduced to one at-large House seat, and Young failed in his re-election bid, losing to Bender.

Young served in the U.S. Army from 1943 to 1946, entering as a major and being discharged as a lieutenant colonel. In 1945, during World War II, he served as the Allied Military Governor of the Province of Reggio Emilia in Italy. He returned to practicing law in Cleveland and Washington, D.C.

In 1948, Young was elected to the U.S. House for a fourth time, defeating his old adversary George H. Bender, but promptly lost his seat again to Bender in 1950. In 1956, Young ran for attorney general of Ohio, winning the Democratic nomination again but losing in the general election to Ohio House Speaker William Saxbe (who would later serve in the U.S. Senate, as well as U.S. Attorney General under Richard Nixon).

=== U.S. Senate (1959–1971) ===
Young ran for the United States Senate in 1958 against the Republican incumbent, Senator John W. Bricker, who had been Thomas E. Dewey's running mate in the 1944 presidential election. Bricker seemed invincible, but Young capitalized on widespread public opposition to the proposed right-to-work law amendment to Ohio's constitution, which Bricker had endorsed. Few thought that Young, who was 69 at the time, could win; even members of his own party had doubts, particularly Ohio's other senator, Democrat Frank J. Lausche. In an upset, Young defeated Bricker. Young knew that Lausche had not supported him and, when he took the oath of office, refused to allow Lausche to stand with him. This broke with the Senate custom of a senior senator escorting the junior senator of his state to take the oath.

In the U.S. Senate, Young was well known for his biting responses to abusive, offensive, or ignorant letters from constituents. On one occasion, he wrote, "Dear Sir: It appears to me that you have been grossly misinformed, or are exceedingly stupid. Which is it?" On another, he received a hostile letter that ended with the constituent's phone number and the message, "I would welcome the opportunity to have intercourse with you." Young wrote back, "you sir, can have intercourse with yourself."

Young was very narrowly re-elected in 1964, defeating the Republican nominee, then-Representative Robert Taft Jr., who was the son of conservative icon Senator Robert A. Taft from Ohio and the grandson of William Howard Taft. The result was considered an upset by The New York Times, as Taft's family name was "considered magic" in the state and Young's advanced age and polarizing attitude towards constituents were thought to be liabilities.

Young stood as a favorite son in the 1968 Ohio presidential primary. He did not enter any other primaries or stand as a candidate in his own right; he ultimately endorsed Hubert Humphrey. He decided not to run for re-election to the Senate in 1970 and was succeeded by Taft, who was again the Republican nominee.

== Personal life and death ==
Young lived in Washington, D.C., until his death on December 1, 1984. He is buried in Norwalk Cemetery, Norwalk, Ohio.

Party political offices
Preceded by Joseph McGhee	Democratic nominee for Attorney General of Ohio; 1922	Succeeded by Charles B. Zimmerman
Preceded by Paul F. Ward	Democratic nominee for Attorney General of Ohio; 1956	Succeeded by Mark McElroy
Preceded by Michael DiSalle	Democratic nominee for U.S. Senator from Ohio; 1958, 1964	Succeeded by Howard Metzenbaum
U.S. House of Representatives
New district	Member of the U.S. House of Representatives from Ohio's at-large congressional district March 4, 1933 – January 3, 1937 alongside George H. Bender and Daniel Scofield Earhart	Succeeded by Harold G. Mosier, John McSweeney
Preceded by George H. Bender, L. L. Marshall	Member of the U.S. House of Representatives from Ohio's at-large congressional district January 3, 1941 – January 3, 1943 alongside George H. Bender	Succeeded by George H. Bender
Preceded by George H. Bender	Member of the U.S. House of Representatives from Ohio's at-large congressional district January 3, 1949 – January 3, 1951	Succeeded by George H. Bender
U.S. Senate
Preceded by John W. Bricker	U.S. senator (Class 1) from Ohio; January 3, 1959 – January 3, 1971; Served alongside: Frank J. Lausche, William B. Saxbe	Succeeded by Robert Taft, Jr.
Honorary titles
Preceded by Hall Lusk; Oregon	Oldest living U.S. senator May 15, 1983 – December 1, 1984	Succeeded by Samuel Reynolds; Nebraska
