= Joe L. Smith =

American politician

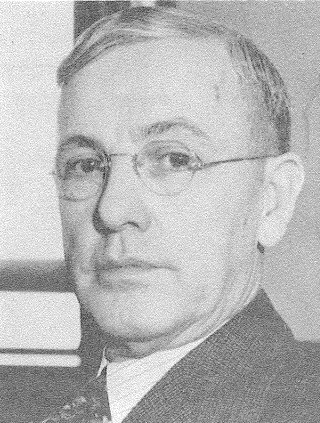

Member of the U.S. House of Representatives from West Virginia's 6th district
- In office March 4, 1929 – January 3, 1945
- Preceded by: Edward T. England
- Succeeded by: E. H. Hedrick

Member of the West Virginia Senate from the 7th district
- In office December 1, 1908 – December 1, 1912
- Preceded by: W. A. Ballard
- Succeeded by: Carl C. Coalter

Personal details
- Born: Joseph Luther Smith; May 22, 1880 Marshes, West Virginia, U.S.
- Died: August 23, 1962 (aged 82) Beckley, West Virginia, U.S.
- Party: Democratic
- Spouse: Christine Carlson

Joseph Luther Smith, commonly known as Joe L. Smith (May 22, 1880 – August 23, 1962), was an American politician, and a member of the Democratic Party from West Virginia.

He was born in Marshes (now Glen Daniel, West Virginia) in Raleigh County, West Virginia, where he attended public and private schools. Smith was editor and owner of Raleigh Register in Beckley, West Virginia. In addition, he was engaged in the real estate and banking businesses.

His political career began in 1904, when, aged 24, he became mayor of Beckley, a post he held 25 years later in 1929. He also served in the State Senate (1909–1913). Smith was elected to the United States House of Representatives from West Virginia's 6th District in 1928, where he served eight two-year terms (March 4, 1929 – January 3, 1945). He rose to become chairman of the House Committee on Mines and Mining (Seventy-second through Seventy-eighth Congresses). He didn't seek a ninth term in 1944. Fellow Democrat E. H. Hedrick replaced him. After leaving politics, Smith resumed his banking career and resided in Beckley, where he died. He is interred in Sunset Memorial Park.

His son Hulett C. Smith served as Governor of West Virginia.

== See also ==
- List of mayors of Beckley, West Virginia

U.S. House of Representatives
Preceded by Edward T. England	Member of the U.S. House of Representatives from West Virginia's 6th congressional district 1929-1945	Succeeded by E. H. Hedrick
