= 1964 United States Senate election in Ohio =

- November 3, 1964
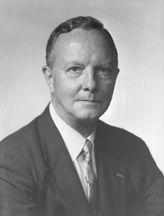

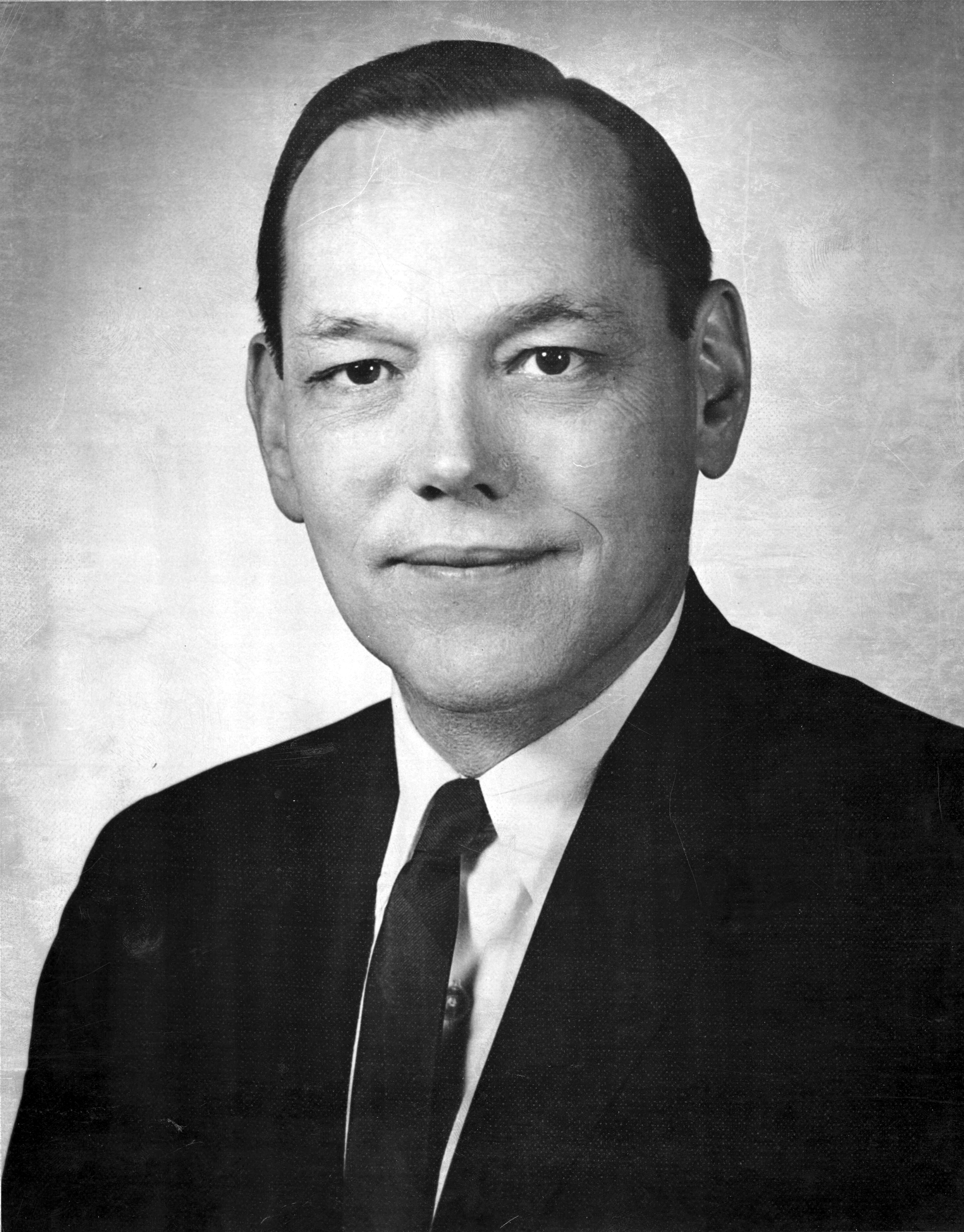
Nominee	Stephen M. Young	Robert Taft Jr.
Party	Democratic	Republican
Popular vote	1,923,608	1,906,781
Percentage	50.22%	49.78%
- County results Young: 50–60% 60–70% Taft: 50–60% 60–70%
U.S. senator before election
Stephen M. Young
Democratic
Elected U.S. Senator
Stephen M. Young
Democratic

The 1964 United States Senate election in Ohio took place on November 3, 1964. Incumbent Democratic Senator Stephen M. Young was re-elected to a second term in office, narrowly defeating Republican U.S. Representative Robert Taft, Jr. The result was considered an upset by The New York Times, as Taft's family name was "considered magic" in the state and Young's advanced age and polarizing attitude towards constituents were thought to be liabilities.

== Democratic primary ==
=== Candidates ===
- Albert T. Ball, Shaker Heights resident
- William Hotchkiss, Akron resident
- Stephen M. Young, incumbent Senator since 1959

==== Withdrew ====
- John Glenn, member of the Mercury Seven and first American to orbit the planet Earth (withdrew March 30)

=== Campaign ===
Astronaut John Glenn resigned from NASA and entered the race on January 17, 1964. However, a little over one month later, he was injured after slipping and falling while repairing his bathroom mirror. He suffered a concussion and an inner ear injury and was hospitalized in Columbus, before being flown to Wilford Hall Air Force Hospital in Texas on March 6.

After weeks in recovery, Glenn withdrew from the race on March 30 in a press conference from his hospital bed. He cited the medical advice of his doctors and his inability to campaign. “No man has a right to ask for a seat in either branch of the Congress merely because of a specific event such as orbiting the earth in a spacecraft, any more than he would have that right just by being a lawyer and having tried a few cases at the local courthouse,” Glenn said. "I will not run just asking the people of Ohio to vote for a name."

=== Results ===
1964 Democratic Senate primary
Party	Candidate	Votes	%
Democratic	Stephen M. Young (incumbent)	520,641	66.51%
Democratic	John Glenn (withdrawn)	206,956	26.44%
Democratic	Albert T. Ball	32,564	4.16%
Democratic	William Hotchkiss	22,618	2.89%
Total votes		782,779	100.00%

== Republican primary ==
=== Candidates ===
- Ted W. Brown, Ohio Secretary of State since 1951
- Robert Taft Jr., U.S. Representative from Cincinnati (representing Ohio at-large) and scion of the Taft family

=== Results ===
1964 Republican Senate primary
Party	Candidate	Votes	%
Republican	Robert Taft Jr.	606,944	79.11%
Republican	Ted W. Brown	160,263	20.89%
Total votes		767,207	100.00%

== General election ==
=== Results ===
1964 U.S. Senate election in Ohio
Party	Candidate	Votes	%	±%
Democratic	Stephen M. Young (incumbent)	1,923,608	50.22%	▼2.24
Republican	Robert Taft Jr.	1,906,781	49.78%	▲2.24
Total votes		3,830,389		
Democratic hold				

== See also ==
- 1964 United States Senate elections
