= George H. Bender =

American politician (1896–1961)

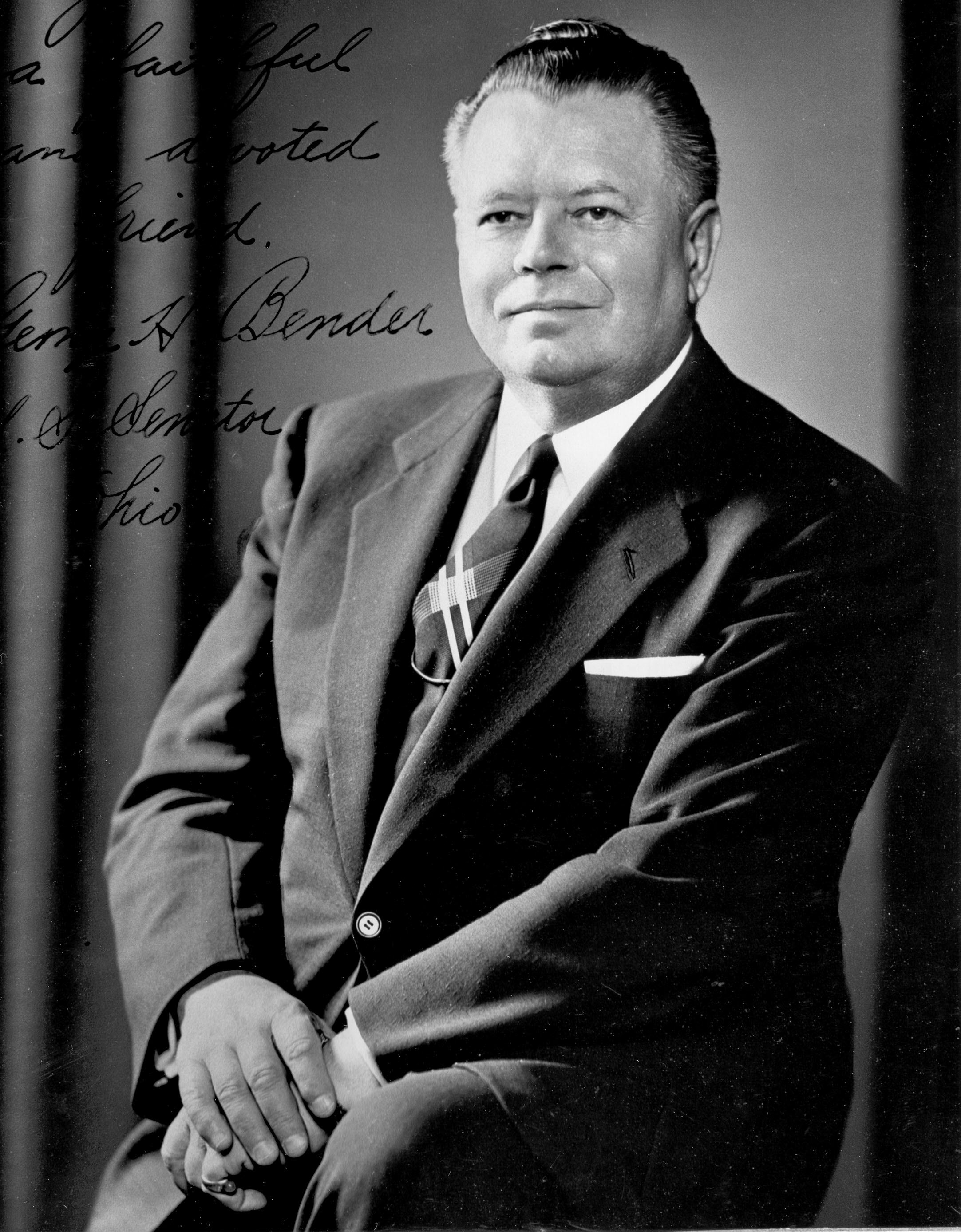

United States Senator from Ohio
- In office December 16, 1954 – January 3, 1957
- Preceded by: Thomas A. Burke
- Succeeded by: Frank Lausche

Member of the U.S. House of Representatives from Ohio
- In office January 3, 1939 – January 3, 1949
- Preceded by: John McSweeney
- Succeeded by: Stephen M. Young
- Constituency: At-large
- In office January 3, 1951 – December 15, 1954
- Preceded by: Stephen M. Young
- Succeeded by: William Edwin Minshall, Jr.
- Constituency: At-large (1951–53); 23rd district (1953–54)

Personal details
- Born: George Harrison Bender; September 29, 1896 Cleveland, Ohio, U.S.
- Died: June 18, 1961 (aged 64) Chagrin Falls, Ohio, U.S.
- Resting place: Knollwood Cemetery in Mayfield Heights, Ohio
- Party: Republican

George Harrison Bender (September 29, 1896 – June 18, 1961) was an American politician who served as a U.S. senator for Ohio from 1954 to 1957. A member of the Republican Party, he previously served in the United States House of Representatives from 1939 to 1949 and again from 1951 to 1954.

== Early life ==
George was born in Cleveland, Ohio, to Czech immigrants Joseph Bender, an employee at General Electric, and Anna Šírová (1866–1933). Anna was born in Fryšava pod Žákovou horou to Jan Šír and Anna Slámová, baptized under the Calvinist Helvetian Reform church in Nové Město na Moravě. Bender attended West Commerce High School, graduating in 1914. Bender was of Czech descent.

With an early interest in politics, at 15, he collected 10,000 signatures on a petition encouraging former president Theodore Roosevelt to run for the presidency in 1912. Bender presented the petition to Roosevelt personally and was rewarded when Roosevelt wrote him with news of his candidacy for the Republican presidential nomination, shortly before it was publicly announced. In 1916, Bender served as a delegate to the abortive Progressive Party convention, which voted to dissolve rather than nominate its own presidential candidate. During the November election, Bender campaigned for Republican Party candidates. His shifting party orientation reflected the internal divisions between "progressive" and "Old Guard" Republicans from 1912 to 1916.

== Career ==
=== Ohio General Assembly and magazines (1920–1938) ===
In 1920, as a Republican, he became the youngest person to win a seat in the Ohio Senate to that time. Serving until 1930, he had limited influence. He pushed unsuccessfully for the introduction of teacher tenure. Initially a strong supporter of Prohibition, he changed his attitude after the police had received an anonymous tip and raided his house in search of liquor. They found nothing, but Bender thereafter vehemently opposed the alcohol ban. In 1934, he founded the National Republican and the Ohio Republican magazines, which he also edited and published.

=== U.S. Representative (1939–1954) ===
After losing four bids for the U.S. House of Representatives in 1930, 1932, 1934, and 1936, he at last won in 1938. He was re-elected until 1948, a Democratic electoral year. He won the seat back in 1950 and retained it for four more years.

Strongly opposed to President Franklin Roosevelt's foreign and domestic policies, Bender articulated his criticism in the polemical The Challenge of 1940 (1940). The only aspects of Roosevelt's agenda that escaped Bender's censure were some humanitarian New Deal programs, notably the Works Progress Administration, which he accepted only as a temporary measure. With the onset of the Cold War after 1945, Bender opposed the Marshall Plan and the Truman Doctrine.

He did not question the necessity of helping European countries devastated by the war, but he disagreed with the idea that the US government should take a direct role in channeling the relief aid. He argued that assistance for European recovery should come through the United Nations or private relief organizations. He also fervently opposed aid to Greece and Turkey, where British influence had been strong, on the premise that US involvement in the region only accommodated the "needs of a collapsing British empire" but did not benefit the United States.

His reputation for strong party loyalty brought Bender the job of organizer for Ohio Senator Robert A. Taft's candidacy for the presidential nomination at the 1948 and 1952 Republican National Conventions. His public role included arranging musical entertainment, conducting singing, leading demonstrations, and ringing cowbells. His often-comic antics led to many unfairly dismissive jokes, as his opponents quickly dubbed him the "Clown Prince." That mockery did not diminish the fact that he remained a serious and influential political figure.

Bender was in a famous 1952 newsreel addressing a gathering of over 15,000 people in the Cleveland Public Auditorium immediately after Richard Nixon had given his wildly successful Checkers speech on television. Bender asked the crowd to show if it was for Nixon and was greeted with a thunderous ovation of support.

=== U.S. Senator (1954–1957) ===
After Taft's death in 1953, Bender narrowly won the election for the vacant Senate seat and served the remaining two years of its term. An avowed supporter of President Dwight Eisenhower, Bender consistently endorsed both Republican Party and presidential initiatives. His earlier isolationist views softened considerably, and he now approved of more direct US involvement abroad, including aid to countries of the former British Empire. Bender, however, joined with two fellow Republicans and three Democrats in voting in favor of a motion to adjourn for five minutes in late July 1956 that amounted to a vote for getting a civil rights bill to the floor and also, at some level, a rebellion against the prerogatives of party leaders.

In 1956, he lost his Senate seat to Governor Frank J. Lausche, a popular Democrat. Bender then worked as special assistant to the Secretary of the Interior from June 1957 to May 1958 and campaigned for the incorporation of Alaska as the 49th state.

=== Teamsters investigation ===
In 1958, Jimmy Hoffa hired Bender to chair a commission investigating racketeering in the Teamsters. After being appointed as the three-man commission's chairman. Bender proceeded independently to send a form letter to every Teamster local in the country. The letter asked the local officials to supply information on "any racketeering or gangster alliances" of which they might be aware within their respective Teamster subunits.

In December 1958, with his research into the locals completed, Bender reported preliminarily to Hoffa that he had found the International Brotherhood of Teamsters "free of corruption." The ex-senator's two colleagues on the commission almost immediately disclaimed any responsibility for that finding. Bender continued his "investigation" with the same degree of intensity until early May 1959 and charged the Teamsters a formidable $58,636.07 in salary and expenses for his efforts.

His political career eventually became clouded by allegations of corruption in his ties to the Teamsters. He was accused of curtailing a 1956 investigation into the organization after receiving a $40,000 campaign contribution. The United States Senate Select Committee on Improper Activities in Labor and Management looked into the accusations in autumn 1958 but recommended no actions.

In his testimony during the hearings with Senator Barry Goldwater, Bender defended his behavior: "When you run for office, you have to have the votes of the washed and the unwashed as well. If cats and dogs could vote I'd shake hands with them." He subsequently lost both a 1960 bid to be a delegate to the Republican National Convention and a 1961 campaign for the post of Republican Precinct Committeeman.

== Personal life ==
In 1920, Bender married Edna Eckhardt; they had two daughters. During his life and political career, Bender held a series of jobs and began a number of business ventures to support his family. His business career included stints as a department store advertising manager, manager of the Cleveland Stadium, and proprietor of a start-up business, the Bender Insurance Company. However, politics remained his only genuine interest. He retreated to a self-imposed retirement and died in Chagrin Falls, a suburb of Cleveland. He was buried at Knollwood Cemetery in Mayfield Heights, Ohio.

Party political offices
Preceded by Robert A. Taft	Republican nominee for U.S. Senator from Ohio (Class 3); 1954, 1956	Succeeded by John Marshall Briley
U.S. House of Representatives
Preceded by John McSweeney	Member of the U.S. House of Representatives from Ohio's at-large congressional district January 3, 1939 – January 3, 1949 alongside: L. L. Marshall, Stephen M. Young	Succeeded by Stephen M. Young
Preceded by Stephen M. Young	Member of the U.S. House of Representatives from Ohio's at-large congressional district January 3, 1951 – January 3, 1953	District eliminated
New district	Member of the U.S. House of Representatives from Ohio's 23rd congressional district January 3, 1953 – December 15, 1954	Succeeded by William E. Minshall, Jr.
U.S. Senate
Preceded by Thomas A. Burke	U.S. senator (Class 3) from Ohio; December 16, 1954 – January 3, 1957; Served alongside: John W. Bricker	Succeeded by Frank J. Lausche
