= Darl W. Poling =

American judge of the 10th Circuit Court of West Virginia

The Honorable Darl Poling

Judge of the Raleigh County Circuit Court
- Incumbent
- Assumed office April 10, 2019
- Appointed by: Jim Justice
- Preceded by: John A. Hutchison

Personal details
- Born: 1962 (age 63–64) Beckley, West Virginia, U.S.
- Spouse: Cindy Poling
- Children: 1
- Education: West Virginia University (BA), West Virginia University College of Law (JD)

Darl W. Poling (born 1962) is a judge of the Raleigh County Circuit Court in West Virginia. Poling was appointed by Governor Jim Justice in 2019 to serve as a circuit judge on the Tenth Judicial District in Raleigh County following the appointment of Judge John A. Hutchison to the West Virginia Supreme Court of Appeals.

== Biography ==
Poling was born in Beckley, West Virginia and is a lifelong resident of Beckley. He is a 1980 graduate of Woodrow Wilson High School (Beckley, West Virginia) and a collegiate graduate West Virginia University, and the West Virginia University College of Law, where he earned his Juris Doctor degree.

=== Judicial service ===
Poling was a Beckley municipal court judge until he was appointed to serve as a circuit judge of the Tenth Judicial Circuit in 2019 by West Virginia Governor Jim Justice following Raleigh County judge John A. Hutchison's appointment to the Supreme Court of Appeals of West Virginia. Poling was also a lawyer with the law firm of Abrams, Byron, Henderson & Richmond and in 1990, formed the law firm Canterbury, Poling & Roop. He was also a public defender with the Public Defender Corporation of Raleigh County. Poling was sworn in as circuit judge by Judge H. L. Kirkpatrick on April 10, 2019.

== Personal life ==
Poling is married to Cindy Poling, who is a teacher with Raleigh County Schools for more than thirty years. They have one son, Sean.

Legal offices	Judge of the Raleigh County Circuit Court; 2019–present	Incumbent
