= Elias Langham =

American politician

2nd Speaker of the Ohio House of Representatives
- In office December 5, 1803 – December 2, 1804
- Preceded by: Michael Baldwin
- Succeeded by: Michael Baldwin

Member of the Ohio House of Representatives from Ross County

Member of the Ohio House of Representatives
- In office 1803–1806

Personal details
- Born: 1749 Essex County, Virginia, U.S.
- Died: April 1830 (age 80-81)
- Party: Democratic-Republican

Elias Langham (1749 – April 1830), born in Essex County, Virginia, was an American politician, land surveyor and soldier. He was a member of the Ohio House of Representatives representing Ross County, Ohio from 1803 to 1806 and served as speaker of that house from December 5, 1803 to December 2, 1804.
