= List of United States Senate elections in Ohio =

United States Senate elections in Ohio occur when voters in the U.S. state of Ohio select an individual to represent the state in the United States Senate in either of the state's two seats allotted by the Constitution. Regularly scheduled general elections occur on Election Day, coinciding with various other federal, statewide, and local races.

Each state is allotted two U.S. Senators elected to staggered six-year terms, which were originally selected by the state legislature. The Senate is divided into three classes to stagger the terms of its members such that one-third of the Senate would be up for re-election every two years. Upon Ohio's admission to the Union in 1803, the state was assigned a Class 1 seat and a Class 3 seat, first elected in 1803. Since the passage of the Seventeenth Amendment in 1913, U.S. Senators are elected directly by the voters of each state. Special elections may be held to fill mid-term vacancies to elect an individual to serve the remainder of the unexpired term.

The list below contains results from all U.S. Senate elections held in Ohio after the passage of the Seventeenth Amendment, sorted by year. The next scheduled election for the Class 1 seat is in 2030, while the Class 3 seat will hold its next election in 2028.

== List of recent elections ==
=== Class 1 ===
Year	Winner				Runner(s)-up				Others		Ref
Year	Candidate	Party	Votes	%	Candidate	Party	Votes	%	Votes	%	Ref
1916	Atlee Pomerene*	Democratic	571,488	49.26%	Myron T. Herrick	Republican	535,391	46.15%	53,212	4.59%	
1922	Simeon D. Fess	Republican	794,159	50.90%	Atlee Pomerene*	Democratic	744,558	47.72%	21,514	1.38%	
1928	Simeon D. Fess*	Republican	1,412,805	60.73%	Charles V. Truax	Democratic	908,952	39.07%	4,448	0.19%	
1934	A. Victor Donahey	Democratic	1,276,206	59.95%	Simeon D. Fess*	Republican	839,068	39.41%	13,569	0.64%	
1940	Harold Hitz Burton	Republican	1,602,498	52.37%	John McSweeney	Democratic	1,457,304	47.63%			
1946 (sp)	Kingsley A. Taft	Republican	1,193,852	56.22%	Henry P. Webber	Democratic	929,584	43.78%			
1946	John W. Bricker	Republican	1,275,774	57.02%	James W. Huffman	Democratic	947,610	42.36%	13,885	0.62%	
1952	John W. Bricker*	Republican	1,878,961	54.58%	Michael DiSalle	Democratic	1,563,330	45.42%			
1958	Stephen M. Young	Democratic	1,652,211	52.46%	John W. Bricker*	Republican	1,497,199	47.54%			
1964	Stephen M. Young*	Democratic	1,923,608	50.22%	Robert Taft Jr.	Republican	1,906,781	49.78%			
1970	Robert Taft Jr.	Republican	1,565,682	49.68%	Howard Metzenbaum	Democratic	1,495,262	47.45%	90,330	2.87%	
1976	Howard Metzenbaum	Democratic	1,941,113	49.51%	Robert Taft Jr.*	Republican	1,823,774	46.52%	155,726	3.97%	
1982	Howard Metzenbaum*	Democratic	1,923,767	56.66%	Paul Pfeifer	Republican	1,396,790	41.14%	74,906	2.20%	
1988	Howard Metzenbaum*	Democratic	2,480,038	56.97%	George Voinovich	Republican	1,872,716	43.02%	151	0.00%	
1994	Mike DeWine	Republican	1,836,556	53.44%	Joel Hyatt	Democratic	1,348,213	39.23%	84	0.00%	
1994	Mike DeWine	Republican	1,836,556	53.44%	Joe Slovenec	Independent	252,031	7.33%	84	0.00%	
2000	Mike DeWine*	Republican	2,665,512	59.92%	Ted Celeste	Democratic	1,595,066	35.85%	188,223	4.23%	
2006	Sherrod Brown	Democratic	2,257,369	56.16%	Mike DeWine*	Republican	1,761,037	43.82%	830	0.02%	
2012	Sherrod Brown*	Democratic	2,762,766	50.70%	Josh Mandel	Republican	2,435,744	44.70%	250,617	4.60%	
2018	Sherrod Brown*	Democratic	2,358,508	53.40%	Jim Renacci	Republican	2,057,559	46.58%	1,017	0.02%	
2024	Bernie Moreno	Republican	2,857,383	50.09%	Sherrod Brown*	Democratic	2,650,949	46.47%	196,288	3.44%	

County results of Class 1 elections since 2006

2006
Brown vs. DeWine

2012
Brown vs. Mandel

2018
Brown vs. Renacci

2024
Moreno vs. Brown

=== Class 3 ===
Year	Winner				Runner(s)-up				Others		Ref
Year	Candidate	Party	Votes	%	Candidate	Party	Votes	%	Votes	%	Ref
1914	Warren G. Harding	Republican	526,115	49.16%	Timothy Sylvester Hogan	Democratic	423,742	39.60%	52,803	4.93%	
1914	Warren G. Harding	Republican	526,115	49.16%	Arthur Lovett Garford	Progressive	67,509	6.31%	52,803	4.93%	
1920	Frank B. Willis	Republican	1,134,953	59.10%	William Alexander Julian	Democratic	782,650	40.76%	2,647	0.14%	
1926	Frank B. Willis*	Republican	711,359	53.19%	Atlee Pomerene	Democratic	623,221	46.60%	2,846	0.21%	
1928 (sp)	Theodore E. Burton	Republican	1,429,554	62.43%	Graham P. Hunt	Democratic	856,807	37.42%	3,451	0.15%	
1930 (sp)	Robert J. Bulkley	Democratic	1,046,561	54.78%	Roscoe C. McCulloch	Republican	863,944	45.22%			
1932	Robert J. Bulkley*	Democratic	1,293,175	52.53%	Gilbert Bettman	Republican	1,126,832	45.77%	41,987	1.71%	
1938	Robert A. Taft	Republican	1,255,414	53.62%	Robert J. Bulkley*	Democratic	1,085,792	46.38%			
1944	Robert A. Taft*	Republican	1,500,609	50.30%	William G. Pickrel	Democratic	1,482,610	49.70%			
1950	Robert A. Taft*	Republican	1,645,643	57.54%	Joseph T. Ferguson	Democratic	1,214,459	42.46%			
1954 (sp)	George H. Bender	Republican	1,257,874	50.06%	Thomas A. Burke*	Democratic	1,254,904	49.94%			
1956	Frank Lausche	Democratic	1,864,589	52.89%	George H. Bender*	Republican	1,660,910	47.11%			
1962	Frank Lausche*	Democratic	1,843,813	61.56%	John Marshall Briley	Republican	1,151,173	38.44%			
1968	William B. Saxbe	Republican	1,928,964	51.53%	John J. Gilligan	Democratic	1,814,152	48.47%	4	0.00%	
1974	John Glenn	Democratic	1,930,670	64.62%	Ralph Perk	Republican	918,133	30.73%	138,803	4.65%	
1980	John Glenn*	Democratic	2,770,786	68.80%	Jim Betts	Republican	1,137,695	28.25%	118,822	2.95%	
1986	John Glenn*	Democratic	1,949,208	62.45%	Tom Kindness	Republican	1,171,893	37.55%	88	0.00%	
1992	John Glenn*	Democratic	2,444,397	50.88%	Mike DeWine	Republican	2,028,434	42.22%			
1992	John Glenn*	Democratic	2,444,397	50.88%	Martha Grevatt	Workers World	331,125	6.89%			
1998	George Voinovich	Republican	1,922,087	56.46%	Mary O. Boyle	Democratic	1,482,054	43.53%	210	0.01%	
2004	George Voinovich*	Republican	3,464,651	63.85%	Eric Fingerhut	Democratic	1,961,249	36.14%	296	0.01%	
2010	Rob Portman	Republican	2,168,742	56.85%	Lee Fisher	Democratic	1,503,297	39.40%	143,059	3.75%	
2016	Rob Portman*	Republican	3,118,567	58.03%	Ted Strickland	Democratic	1,996,908	37.16%	258,689	4.81%	
2022	JD Vance	Republican	2,192,114	53.04%	Tim Ryan	Democratic	1,939,489	46.92%	1,739	0.04%	
2026 (sp)	Sherrod Brown	Democratic	2,302,669	50.01%	Jon Husted*	Republican	2,080,064	45.17%	222,127	4.82%	

County results of Class 3 elections since 2010

2010
Portman vs. Fisher

2016
Portman vs. Strickland

2022
Vance vs. Ryan

2026
Brown vs. Husted

== See also ==
- List of United States senators from Ohio
- List of United States presidential elections in Ohio
- Elections in Ohio
