= 1974 United States Senate election in Ohio =

- November 5, 1974
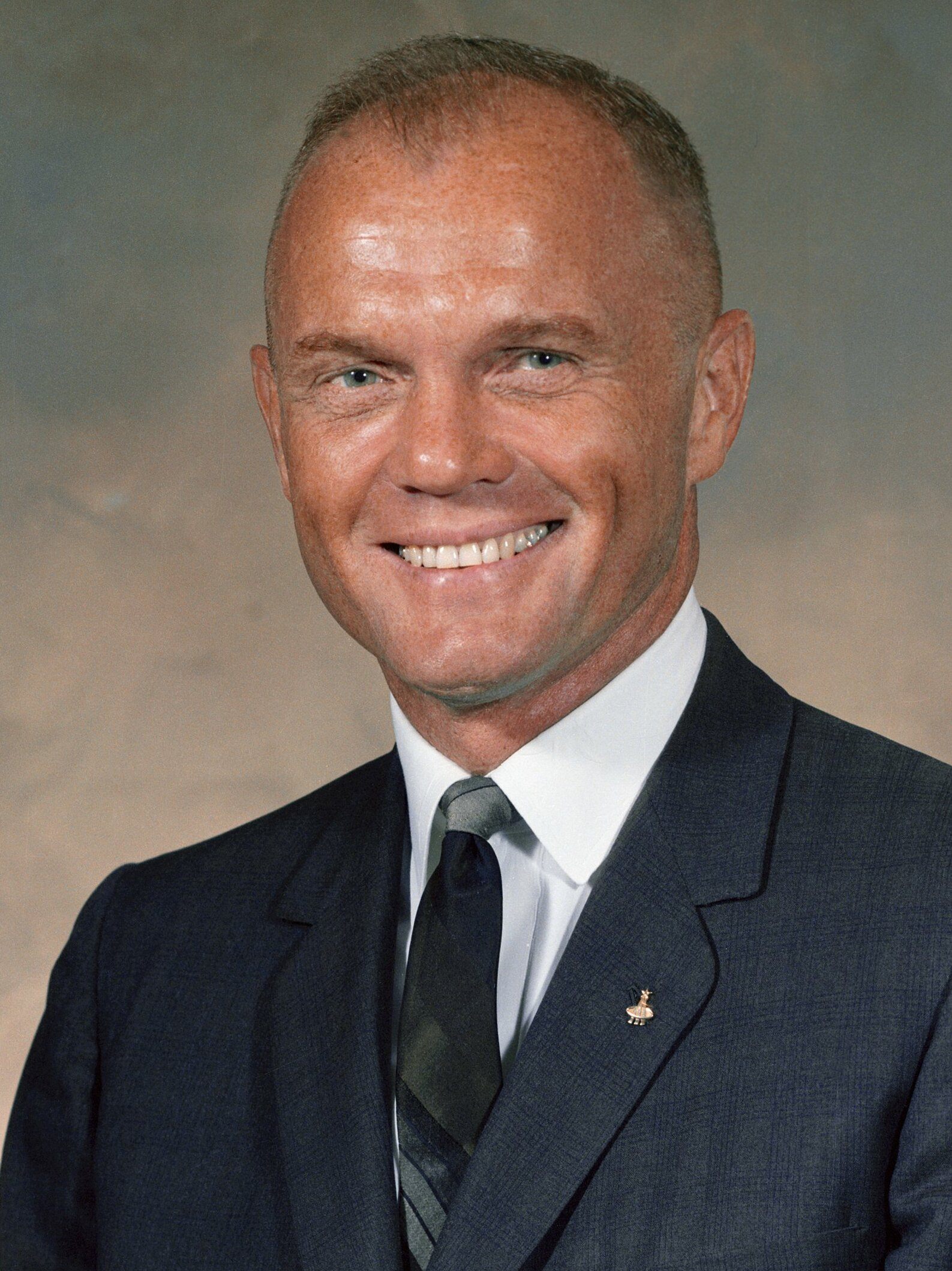

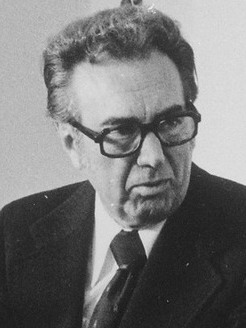
Nominee	John Glenn	Ralph Perk
Party	Democratic	Republican
Popular vote	1,930,670	918,133
Percentage	64.62%	30.73%
- County results Glenn: 50–60% 60–70% 70–80%
U.S. senator before election
Howard Metzenbaum
Democratic
Elected U.S. Senator
John Glenn
Democratic

The 1974 United States Senate election in Ohio took place on November 5, 1974.

Senator Howard Metzenbaum, who had been appointed to the seat in 1974 by Ohio governor John J. Gilligan, lost the Democratic primary election to famed astronaut John Glenn. In the general election, Glenn won every county in the state against Cleveland mayor Ralph Perk.

Metzenbaum would later be elected to Ohio's other U.S. Senate seat in 1976, and worked with Glenn as the state's junior senator until he retired in 1994.

== Background ==
Incumbent Senator William B. Saxbe resigned from office on January 3, 1974 to become United States attorney general. Saxbe was the permanent replacement for Elliot Richardson, who had resigned during the Saturday Night Massacre in response to the ongoing Watergate scandal. Governor of Ohio John J. Gilligan appointed Howard Metzenbaum, who had been the unsuccessful Democratic nominee for Ohio's other Senate seat in 1970, to fill the vacant seat for the remainder of Saxbe's unexpired term, which was due to end on January 3, 1975.

== Democratic primary ==
=== Candidates ===
- John Glenn, retired astronaut and candidate for U.S. Senate in 1964 and 1970
- Howard Metzenbaum, interim U.S. senator and nominee for U.S. Senate in 1970

=== Campaign ===
The Democratic primary was a rematch of the 1970 election, in which Metzenbaum had narrowly defeated Glenn. Glenn had also run for the Democratic nomination unsuccessfully in 1964 before withdrawing from the race due to health problems following a fall.

=== Results ===
Results by county Glenn: 50–60%; 60–70%; 70–80%; Metzenbaum: 50–60%; 60–70%

1974 Democratic U.S. Senate primary
Party	Candidate	Votes	%
Democratic	John Glenn	571,871	54.36%
Democratic	Howard Metzenbaum (incumbent)	480,123	45.64%
Write-in		33	0.00%
Total votes		1,052,027	100.00%

== General election ==
=== Candidates ===
- John Glenn, retired astronaut and candidate for U.S. Senate in 1964 and 1970 (Democratic)
- K. G. Harroff (Independent)
- Richard B. Kay, perennial candidate (Independent)
- Ralph Perk, mayor of Cleveland since 1971 (Republican)

=== Results ===
1974 United States Senate election in Ohio
Party	Candidate	Votes	%	±%
Democratic	John Glenn	1,930,670	64.62%	▲16.15
Republican	Ralph Perk	918,133	30.73%	▼20.80
Independent	Kathleen G. Harroff	76,882	2.57%	N/A
Independent	Richard B. Kay	61,921	2.07%	N/A
Independent	John O'Neill (write-in)	257	0.01%	N/A
Independent	Ronald E. Girkins (write-in)	88	0.00%	N/A
Total votes		2,987,951	100.00%	

== See also ==
- 1974 United States Senate elections
