= List of United States senators from Ohio =

Current delegation

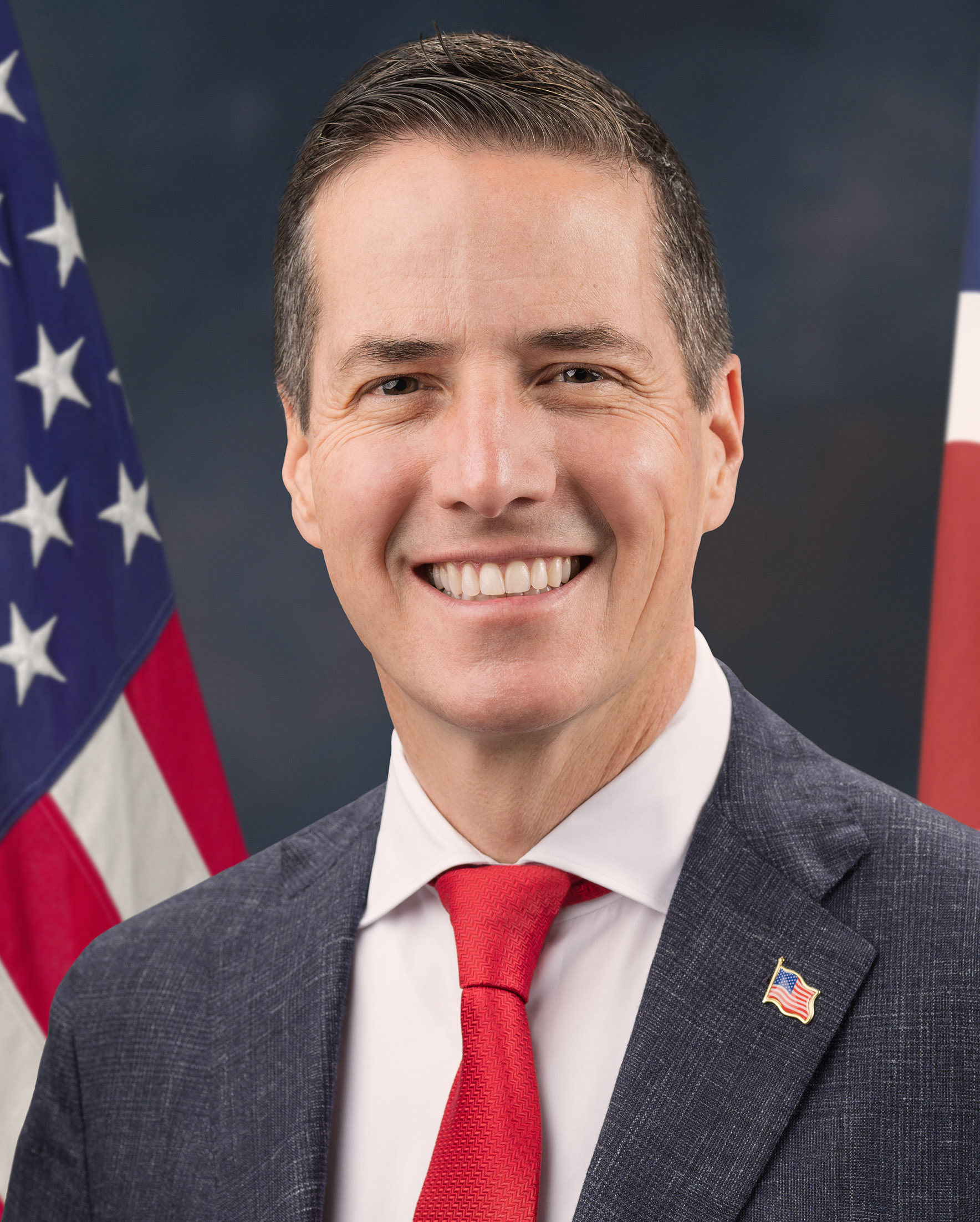
Bernie Moreno (R)

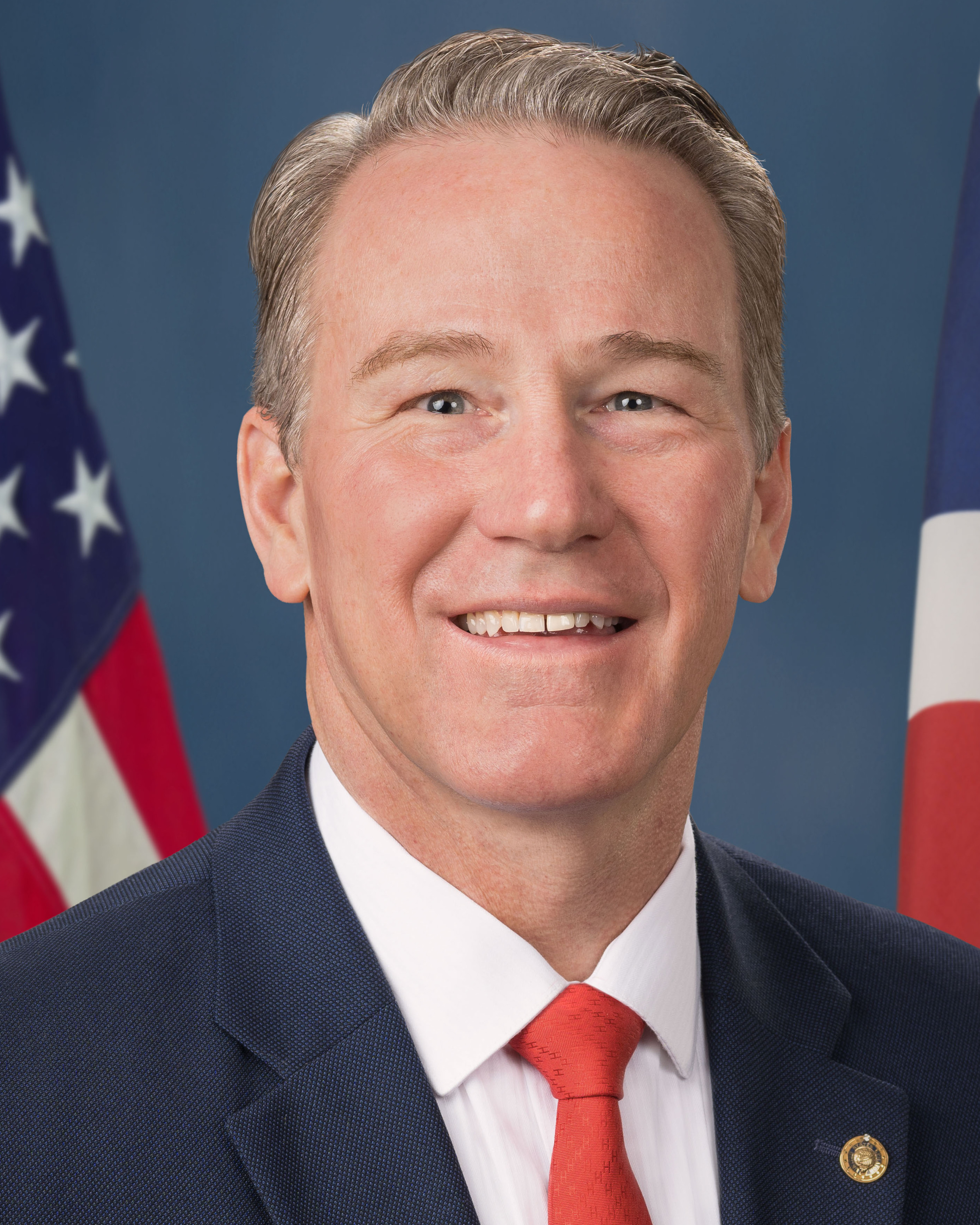
Jon Husted (R)

(ordered by seniority)

Ohio was admitted to the Union on March 1, 1803, and elects U.S. senators to class 1 and class 3. Its current U.S. senators are Republicans Bernie Moreno and Jon Husted (both serving since 2025). John Sherman was Ohio's longest-serving senator (1861–1877; 1881–1897) having served non-consecutively.

== List of senators ==
| Class 1 Class 1 senators belong to the electoral cycle that most recently had regular elections in 2006, 2012, 2018, and 2024. The next election will be in 2030. | | | | | | C | Class 3 Class 3 senators belong to the electoral cycle that most recently had regular elections in 2004, 2010, 2016, and 2022. The next election will be in 2028. | | | | | |
| # | Senator | Party | Dates in office | Electoral history | T | C | T | Electoral history | Dates in office | Party | Senator | # |
|---|---|---|---|---|---|---|---|---|---|---|---|---|
| 1 | John Smith (Columbia) | Democratic- Republican | Apr 1, 1803 – Apr 25, 1808 | Elected in 1803. Resigned. | 1 | 8th | 1 | Elected in 1803. Retired. | Apr 1, 1803 – Mar 3, 1807 | Democratic- Republican | Thomas Worthington (Chillicothe) | 1 |
| 1 | John Smith (Columbia) | Democratic- Republican | Apr 1, 1803 – Apr 25, 1808 | Elected in 1803. Resigned. | 1 | 9th | 1 | Elected in 1803. Retired. | Apr 1, 1803 – Mar 3, 1807 | Democratic- Republican | Thomas Worthington (Chillicothe) | 1 |
| 1 | John Smith (Columbia) | Democratic- Republican | Apr 1, 1803 – Apr 25, 1808 | Elected in 1803. Resigned. | 1 | 10th | 2 | Elected in 1807. Resigned. | Mar 4, 1807 – Mar 3, 1809 | Democratic- Republican | Edward Tiffin (Chillicothe) | 2 |
| Vacant | | | Apr 25, 1808 – Dec 12, 1808 | | 1 | 10th | 2 | Elected in 1807. Resigned. | Mar 4, 1807 – Mar 3, 1809 | Democratic- Republican | Edward Tiffin (Chillicothe) | 2 |
| 2 | Return J. Meigs Jr. (Marietta) | Democratic- Republican | Dec 12, 1808 – Dec 8, 1810 | Elected in 1808 to finish Smith's term. | 1 | 10th | 2 | Elected in 1807. Resigned. | Mar 4, 1807 – Mar 3, 1809 | Democratic- Republican | Edward Tiffin (Chillicothe) | 2 |
| 2 | Return J. Meigs Jr. (Marietta) | Democratic- Republican | Dec 12, 1808 – Dec 8, 1810 | Elected in 1808 to full term. Resigned to become Governor of Ohio. | 2 | 11th | 2 | | Mar 4, 1809 – May 18, 1809 | Vacant | | |
| 2 | Return J. Meigs Jr. (Marietta) | Democratic- Republican | Dec 12, 1808 – Dec 8, 1810 | Elected in 1808 to full term. Resigned to become Governor of Ohio. | 2 | 11th | 2 | Appointed to continue Tiffin's term. Retired when successor elected. | May 18, 1809 – Dec 11, 1809 | Democratic- Republican | Stanley Griswold (Chillicothe) | 3 |
| Vacant | | | Dec 8, 1810 – Dec 15, 1810 | | 2 | 11th | 2 | Appointed to continue Tiffin's term. Retired when successor elected. | May 18, 1809 – Dec 11, 1809 | Democratic- Republican | Stanley Griswold (Chillicothe) | 3 |
| Vacant | | | Dec 8, 1810 – Dec 15, 1810 | | 2 | 11th | 2 | Elected in 1809 to finish Tiffin's term. Retired. | Dec 11, 1809 – Mar 3, 1813 | Democratic- Republican | Alexander Campbell (Ripley) | 4 |
| 3 | Thomas Worthington (Chillicothe) | Democratic- Republican | Dec 15, 1810 – Dec 1, 1814 | Elected in 1810 to finish Meigs's term. Resigned to become Governor of Ohio. | 2 | 11th | 2 | Elected in 1809 to finish Tiffin's term. Retired. | Dec 11, 1809 – Mar 3, 1813 | Democratic- Republican | Alexander Campbell (Ripley) | 4 |
| 3 | Thomas Worthington (Chillicothe) | Democratic- Republican | Dec 15, 1810 – Dec 1, 1814 | Elected in 1810 to finish Meigs's term. Resigned to become Governor of Ohio. | 2 | 12th | 2 | Elected in 1809 to finish Tiffin's term. Retired. | Dec 11, 1809 – Mar 3, 1813 | Democratic- Republican | Alexander Campbell (Ripley) | 4 |
| 3 | Thomas Worthington (Chillicothe) | Democratic- Republican | Dec 15, 1810 – Dec 1, 1814 | Elected in 1810 to finish Meigs's term. Resigned to become Governor of Ohio. | 2 | 13th | 3 | Elected in 1813. Retired. | Mar 4, 1813 – Mar 3, 1819 | Democratic- Republican | Jeremiah Morrow (Montgomery) | 5 |
| Vacant | | | Dec 1, 1814 – Dec 10, 1814 | | 2 | 13th | 3 | Elected in 1813. Retired. | Mar 4, 1813 – Mar 3, 1819 | Democratic- Republican | Jeremiah Morrow (Montgomery) | 5 |
| 4 | Joseph Kerr (Chillicothe) | Democratic- Republican | Dec 10, 1814 – Mar 3, 1815 | Elected in 1814 to finish Meigs's term. Retired. | 2 | 13th | 3 | Elected in 1813. Retired. | Mar 4, 1813 – Mar 3, 1819 | Democratic- Republican | Jeremiah Morrow (Montgomery) | 5 |
| 5 | Benjamin Ruggles (St. Clairsville) | Democratic- Republican | Mar 4, 1815 – Mar 3, 1833 | Elected in 1815. | 3 | 14th | 3 | Elected in 1813. Retired. | Mar 4, 1813 – Mar 3, 1819 | Democratic- Republican | Jeremiah Morrow (Montgomery) | 5 |
| 5 | Benjamin Ruggles (St. Clairsville) | Democratic- Republican | Mar 4, 1815 – Mar 3, 1833 | Elected in 1815. | 3 | 15th | 3 | Elected in 1813. Retired. | Mar 4, 1813 – Mar 3, 1819 | Democratic- Republican | Jeremiah Morrow (Montgomery) | 5 |
| 5 | Benjamin Ruggles (St. Clairsville) | Democratic- Republican | Mar 4, 1815 – Mar 3, 1833 | Elected in 1815. | 3 | 16th | 4 | Elected in 1819. Died. | Mar 4, 1819 – Dec 13, 1821 | Democratic- Republican | William A. Trimble (Hillsboro) | 6 |
| 5 | Benjamin Ruggles (St. Clairsville) | Democratic- Republican | Mar 4, 1815 – Mar 3, 1833 | Re-elected in 1821. | 4 | 17th | 4 | Elected in 1819. Died. | Mar 4, 1819 – Dec 13, 1821 | Democratic- Republican | William A. Trimble (Hillsboro) | 6 |
| 5 | Benjamin Ruggles (St. Clairsville) | Democratic- Republican | Mar 4, 1815 – Mar 3, 1833 | Re-elected in 1821. | 4 | 17th | 4 | | Dec 13, 1821 – Jan 3, 1822 | Vacant | | |
| 5 | Benjamin Ruggles (St. Clairsville) | Democratic- Republican | Mar 4, 1815 – Mar 3, 1833 | Re-elected in 1821. | 4 | 17th | 4 | Elected in 1822 to finish Trimble's term. Lost re-election. | Jan 3, 1822 – Mar 3, 1825 | Democratic- Republican | Ethan Allen Brown (Cincinnati) | 7 |
| 5 | Benjamin Ruggles (St. Clairsville) | Democratic- Republican | Mar 4, 1815 – Mar 3, 1833 | Re-elected in 1821. | 4 | 18th | 4 | Elected in 1822 to finish Trimble's term. Lost re-election. | Jan 3, 1822 – Mar 3, 1825 | Democratic- Republican | Ethan Allen Brown (Cincinnati) | 7 |
| 5 | Benjamin Ruggles (St. Clairsville) | National; Republican | Mar 4, 1815 – Mar 3, 1833 | Re-elected in 1821. | 4 | 19th | 5 | Elected in 1824. Resigned to become U.S. Minister to Colombia. | Mar 4, 1825 – May 20, 1828 | National; Republican | William Henry Harrison (Cincinnati) | 8 |
| 5 | Benjamin Ruggles (St. Clairsville) | National; Republican | Mar 4, 1815 – Mar 3, 1833 | Re-elected in 1827. Retired. | 5 | 20th | 5 | Elected in 1824. Resigned to become U.S. Minister to Colombia. | Mar 4, 1825 – May 20, 1828 | National; Republican | William Henry Harrison (Cincinnati) | 8 |
| 5 | Benjamin Ruggles (St. Clairsville) | National; Republican | Mar 4, 1815 – Mar 3, 1833 | Re-elected in 1827. Retired. | 5 | 20th | 5 | | May 20, 1828 – Dec 10, 1828 | Vacant | | |
| 5 | Benjamin Ruggles (St. Clairsville) | National; Republican | Mar 4, 1815 – Mar 3, 1833 | Re-elected in 1827. Retired. | 5 | 20th | 5 | Elected in 1828 to finish Harrison's term. Retired. | Dec 10, 1828 – Mar 3, 1831 | National; Republican | Jacob Burnet (Cincinnati) | 9 |
| 5 | Benjamin Ruggles (St. Clairsville) | National; Republican | Mar 4, 1815 – Mar 3, 1833 | Re-elected in 1827. Retired. | 5 | 21st | 5 | Elected in 1828 to finish Harrison's term. Retired. | Dec 10, 1828 – Mar 3, 1831 | National; Republican | Jacob Burnet (Cincinnati) | 9 |
| 5 | Benjamin Ruggles (St. Clairsville) | National; Republican | Mar 4, 1815 – Mar 3, 1833 | Re-elected in 1827. Retired. | 5 | 22nd | 6 | Elected in 1830. Lost re-election. | Mar 4, 1831 – Mar 3, 1837 | National; Republican | Thomas Ewing (Lancaster) | 10 |
| 6 | Thomas Morris (Bethel) | Jacksonian | Mar 4, 1833 – Mar 3, 1839 | Elected in 1833. Lost re-election. | 6 | 23rd | 6 | Elected in 1830. Lost re-election. | Mar 4, 1831 – Mar 3, 1837 | National; Republican | Thomas Ewing (Lancaster) | 10 |
| 6 | Thomas Morris (Bethel) | Jacksonian | Mar 4, 1833 – Mar 3, 1839 | Elected in 1833. Lost re-election. | 6 | 24th | 6 | Elected in 1830. Lost re-election. | Mar 4, 1831 – Mar 3, 1837 | National; Republican | Thomas Ewing (Lancaster) | 10 |
| 6 | Thomas Morris (Bethel) | Democratic | Mar 4, 1833 – Mar 3, 1839 | Elected in 1833. Lost re-election. | 6 | 25th | 7 | Elected in 1837. | Mar 4, 1837 – Mar 3, 1849 | Democratic | William Allen (Chillicothe) | 11 |
| 7 | Benjamin Tappan (Steubenville) | Democratic | Mar 4, 1839 – Mar 3, 1845 | Elected in 1838. Retired. | 7 | 26th | 7 | Elected in 1837. | Mar 4, 1837 – Mar 3, 1849 | Democratic | William Allen (Chillicothe) | 11 |
| 7 | Benjamin Tappan (Steubenville) | Democratic | Mar 4, 1839 – Mar 3, 1845 | Elected in 1838. Retired. | 7 | 27th | 7 | Elected in 1837. | Mar 4, 1837 – Mar 3, 1849 | Democratic | William Allen (Chillicothe) | 11 |
| 7 | Benjamin Tappan (Steubenville) | Democratic | Mar 4, 1839 – Mar 3, 1845 | Elected in 1838. Retired. | 7 | 28th | 8 | Re-elected in 1842. Lost re-election. | Mar 4, 1837 – Mar 3, 1849 | Democratic | William Allen (Chillicothe) | 11 |
| 8 | Thomas Corwin (Lebanon) | Whig | Mar 4, 1845 – Jul 20, 1850 | Elected in 1844. Resigned to become U.S. Secretary of the Treasury. | 8 | 29th | 8 | Re-elected in 1842. Lost re-election. | Mar 4, 1837 – Mar 3, 1849 | Democratic | William Allen (Chillicothe) | 11 |
| 8 | Thomas Corwin (Lebanon) | Whig | Mar 4, 1845 – Jul 20, 1850 | Elected in 1844. Resigned to become U.S. Secretary of the Treasury. | 8 | 30th | 8 | Re-elected in 1842. Lost re-election. | Mar 4, 1837 – Mar 3, 1849 | Democratic | William Allen (Chillicothe) | 11 |
| 8 | Thomas Corwin (Lebanon) | Whig | Mar 4, 1845 – Jul 20, 1850 | Elected in 1844. Resigned to become U.S. Secretary of the Treasury. | 8 | 31st | 9 | Elected in 1849. Retired. | Mar 4, 1849 – Mar 3, 1855 | Free Soil | Salmon P. Chase (Cincinnati) | 12 |
| 9 | Thomas Ewing (Lancaster) | Whig | Jul 20, 1850 – Mar 3, 1851 | Appointed to finish Corwin's term. Lost election to the next term. | 8 | 31st | 9 | Elected in 1849. Retired. | Mar 4, 1849 – Mar 3, 1855 | Free Soil | Salmon P. Chase (Cincinnati) | 12 |
| Vacant | | | Mar 4, 1851 – Mar 15, 1851 | | 9 | 32nd | 9 | Elected in 1849. Retired. | Mar 4, 1849 – Mar 3, 1855 | Free Soil | Salmon P. Chase (Cincinnati) | 12 |
| 10 | Benjamin Wade (Jefferson) | Whig | Mar 15, 1851 – Mar 3, 1869 | Elected late in 1851. | 9 | 32nd | 9 | Elected in 1849. Retired. | Mar 4, 1849 – Mar 3, 1855 | Free Soil | Salmon P. Chase (Cincinnati) | 12 |
| 10 | Benjamin Wade (Jefferson) | Whig | Mar 15, 1851 – Mar 3, 1869 | Elected late in 1851. | 9 | 33rd | 9 | Elected in 1849. Retired. | Mar 4, 1849 – Mar 3, 1855 | Free Soil | Salmon P. Chase (Cincinnati) | 12 |
| 10 | Benjamin Wade (Jefferson) | Republican | Mar 15, 1851 – Mar 3, 1869 | Elected late in 1851. | 9 | 34th | 10 | Elected in 1854 Lost re-election. | Mar 4, 1855 – Mar 3, 1861 | Democratic | George E. Pugh (Cincinnati) | 13 |
| 10 | Benjamin Wade (Jefferson) | Republican | Mar 15, 1851 – Mar 3, 1869 | Re-elected in 1856. | 10 | 35th | 10 | Elected in 1854 Lost re-election. | Mar 4, 1855 – Mar 3, 1861 | Democratic | George E. Pugh (Cincinnati) | 13 |
| 10 | Benjamin Wade (Jefferson) | Republican | Mar 15, 1851 – Mar 3, 1869 | Re-elected in 1856. | 10 | 36th | 10 | Elected in 1854 Lost re-election. | Mar 4, 1855 – Mar 3, 1861 | Democratic | George E. Pugh (Cincinnati) | 13 |
| 10 | Benjamin Wade (Jefferson) | Republican | Mar 15, 1851 – Mar 3, 1869 | Re-elected in 1856. | 10 | 37th | 11 | Elected in 1860. Resigned to become U.S. Secretary of the Treasury. | Mar 4, 1861 – Mar 6, 1861 | Republican | Salmon P. Chase (Cincinnati) | 14 |
| 10 | Benjamin Wade (Jefferson) | Republican | Mar 15, 1851 – Mar 3, 1869 | Re-elected in 1856. | 10 | 37th | 11 | | Mar 6, 1861 – Mar 21, 1861 | Vacant | | |
| 10 | Benjamin Wade (Jefferson) | Republican | Mar 15, 1851 – Mar 3, 1869 | Re-elected in 1856. | 10 | 37th | 11 | Elected in 1861 to finish Chase's term. | Mar 21, 1861 – Mar 8, 1877 | Republican | John Sherman (Mansfield) | 15 |
| 10 | Benjamin Wade (Jefferson) | Republican | Mar 15, 1851 – Mar 3, 1869 | Re-elected in 1863. Lost renomination. | 11 | 38th | 11 | Elected in 1861 to finish Chase's term. | Mar 21, 1861 – Mar 8, 1877 | Republican | John Sherman (Mansfield) | 15 |
| 10 | Benjamin Wade (Jefferson) | Republican | Mar 15, 1851 – Mar 3, 1869 | Re-elected in 1863. Lost renomination. | 11 | 39th | 11 | Elected in 1861 to finish Chase's term. | Mar 21, 1861 – Mar 8, 1877 | Republican | John Sherman (Mansfield) | 15 |
| 10 | Benjamin Wade (Jefferson) | Republican | Mar 15, 1851 – Mar 3, 1869 | Re-elected in 1863. Lost renomination. | 11 | 40th | 12 | Re-elected in 1866. | Mar 21, 1861 – Mar 8, 1877 | Republican | John Sherman (Mansfield) | 15 |
| 11 | Allen G. Thurman (Columbus) | Democratic | Mar 4, 1869 – Mar 3, 1881 | Elected in 1868. | 12 | 41st | 12 | Re-elected in 1866. | Mar 21, 1861 – Mar 8, 1877 | Republican | John Sherman (Mansfield) | 15 |
| 11 | Allen G. Thurman (Columbus) | Democratic | Mar 4, 1869 – Mar 3, 1881 | Elected in 1868. | 12 | 42nd | 12 | Re-elected in 1866. | Mar 21, 1861 – Mar 8, 1877 | Republican | John Sherman (Mansfield) | 15 |
| 11 | Allen G. Thurman (Columbus) | Democratic | Mar 4, 1869 – Mar 3, 1881 | Elected in 1868. | 12 | 43rd | 13 | Re-elected in 1872. Resigned to become U.S. Secretary of the Treasury. | Mar 21, 1861 – Mar 8, 1877 | Republican | John Sherman (Mansfield) | 15 |
| 11 | Allen G. Thurman (Columbus) | Democratic | Mar 4, 1869 – Mar 3, 1881 | Re-elected in 1874. Lost re-election. | 13 | 44th | 13 | Re-elected in 1872. Resigned to become U.S. Secretary of the Treasury. | Mar 21, 1861 – Mar 8, 1877 | Republican | John Sherman (Mansfield) | 15 |
| 11 | Allen G. Thurman (Columbus) | Democratic | Mar 4, 1869 – Mar 3, 1881 | Re-elected in 1874. Lost re-election. | 13 | 45th | 13 | Re-elected in 1872. Resigned to become U.S. Secretary of the Treasury. | Mar 21, 1861 – Mar 8, 1877 | Republican | John Sherman (Mansfield) | 15 |
| 11 | Allen G. Thurman (Columbus) | Democratic | Mar 4, 1869 – Mar 3, 1881 | Re-elected in 1874. Lost re-election. | 13 | 45th | 13 | | Mar 8, 1877 – Mar 21, 1877 | Vacant | | |
| 11 | Allen G. Thurman (Columbus) | Democratic | Mar 4, 1869 – Mar 3, 1881 | Re-elected in 1874. Lost re-election. | 13 | 45th | 13 | Elected in 1877 to finish Sherman's term. Retired. | Mar 21, 1877 – Mar 3, 1879 | Republican | Stanley Matthews (Glendale) | 16 |
| 11 | Allen G. Thurman (Columbus) | Democratic | Mar 4, 1869 – Mar 3, 1881 | Re-elected in 1874. Lost re-election. | 13 | 46th | 14 | Election date unknown. Lost renomination. | Mar 4, 1879 – Mar 3, 1885 | Democratic | George H. Pendleton (Cincinnati) | 17 |
| 12 | John Sherman (Mansfield) | Republican | Mar 4, 1881 – Mar 4, 1897 | Elected in 1881. | 14 | 47th | 14 | Election date unknown. Lost renomination. | Mar 4, 1879 – Mar 3, 1885 | Democratic | George H. Pendleton (Cincinnati) | 17 |
| 12 | John Sherman (Mansfield) | Republican | Mar 4, 1881 – Mar 4, 1897 | Elected in 1881. | 14 | 48th | 14 | Election date unknown. Lost renomination. | Mar 4, 1879 – Mar 3, 1885 | Democratic | George H. Pendleton (Cincinnati) | 17 |
| 12 | John Sherman (Mansfield) | Republican | Mar 4, 1881 – Mar 4, 1897 | Elected in 1881. | 14 | 49th | 15 | Elected in 1884. Retired. | Mar 4, 1885 – Mar 3, 1891 | Democratic | Henry B. Payne (Cleveland) | 18 |
| 12 | John Sherman (Mansfield) | Republican | Mar 4, 1881 – Mar 4, 1897 | Re-elected in 1886. | 15 | 50th | 15 | Elected in 1884. Retired. | Mar 4, 1885 – Mar 3, 1891 | Democratic | Henry B. Payne (Cleveland) | 18 |
| 12 | John Sherman (Mansfield) | Republican | Mar 4, 1881 – Mar 4, 1897 | Re-elected in 1886. | 15 | 51st | 15 | Elected in 1884. Retired. | Mar 4, 1885 – Mar 3, 1891 | Democratic | Henry B. Payne (Cleveland) | 18 |
| 12 | John Sherman (Mansfield) | Republican | Mar 4, 1881 – Mar 4, 1897 | Re-elected in 1886. | 15 | 52nd | 16 | Elected in 1890. Lost re-election. | Mar 4, 1891 – Mar 3, 1897 | Democratic | Calvin S. Brice (Lima) | 19 |
| 12 | John Sherman (Mansfield) | Republican | Mar 4, 1881 – Mar 4, 1897 | Re-elected in 1892. Resigned to become U.S. Secretary of State. | 16 | 53rd | 16 | Elected in 1890. Lost re-election. | Mar 4, 1891 – Mar 3, 1897 | Democratic | Calvin S. Brice (Lima) | 19 |
| 12 | John Sherman (Mansfield) | Republican | Mar 4, 1881 – Mar 4, 1897 | Re-elected in 1892. Resigned to become U.S. Secretary of State. | 16 | 54th | 16 | Elected in 1890. Lost re-election. | Mar 4, 1891 – Mar 3, 1897 | Democratic | Calvin S. Brice (Lima) | 19 |
| 12 | John Sherman (Mansfield) | Republican | Mar 4, 1881 – Mar 4, 1897 | Re-elected in 1892. Resigned to become U.S. Secretary of State. | 16 | 55th | 17 | Elected in 1896. | Mar 4, 1897 – Mar 3, 1909 | Republican | Joseph B. Foraker (Cincinnati) | 20 |
| 13 | Mark Hanna (Cleveland) | Republican | Mar 5, 1897 – Feb 15, 1904 | Appointed to continue Sherman's term. Elected in 1898 to finish Sherman's term. | 16 | 55th | 17 | Elected in 1896. | Mar 4, 1897 – Mar 3, 1909 | Republican | Joseph B. Foraker (Cincinnati) | 20 |
| 13 | Mark Hanna (Cleveland) | Republican | Mar 5, 1897 – Feb 15, 1904 | Elected in 1898 to the next term. Died. | 17 | 56th | 17 | Elected in 1896. | Mar 4, 1897 – Mar 3, 1909 | Republican | Joseph B. Foraker (Cincinnati) | 20 |
| 13 | Mark Hanna (Cleveland) | Republican | Mar 5, 1897 – Feb 15, 1904 | Elected in 1898 to the next term. Died. | 17 | 57th | 17 | Elected in 1896. | Mar 4, 1897 – Mar 3, 1909 | Republican | Joseph B. Foraker (Cincinnati) | 20 |
| 13 | Mark Hanna (Cleveland) | Republican | Mar 5, 1897 – Feb 15, 1904 | Elected in 1898 to the next term. Died. | 17 | 58th | 18 | Re-elected in 1902. Retired. | Mar 4, 1897 – Mar 3, 1909 | Republican | Joseph B. Foraker (Cincinnati) | 20 |
| Vacant | | | Feb 15, 1904 – Mar 23, 1904 | | 17 | 58th | 18 | Re-elected in 1902. Retired. | Mar 4, 1897 – Mar 3, 1909 | Republican | Joseph B. Foraker (Cincinnati) | 20 |
| 14 | Charles W. F. Dick (Akron) | Republican | Mar 23, 1904 – Mar 3, 1911 | Elected in 1904 to finish Hanna's term. | 17 | 58th | 18 | Re-elected in 1902. Retired. | Mar 4, 1897 – Mar 3, 1909 | Republican | Joseph B. Foraker (Cincinnati) | 20 |
| 14 | Charles W. F. Dick (Akron) | Republican | Mar 23, 1904 – Mar 3, 1911 | Elected in 1904 to the next term. Lost re-election. | 18 | 59th | 18 | Re-elected in 1902. Retired. | Mar 4, 1897 – Mar 3, 1909 | Republican | Joseph B. Foraker (Cincinnati) | 20 |
| 14 | Charles W. F. Dick (Akron) | Republican | Mar 23, 1904 – Mar 3, 1911 | Elected in 1904 to the next term. Lost re-election. | 18 | 60th | 18 | Re-elected in 1902. Retired. | Mar 4, 1897 – Mar 3, 1909 | Republican | Joseph B. Foraker (Cincinnati) | 20 |
| 14 | Charles W. F. Dick (Akron) | Republican | Mar 23, 1904 – Mar 3, 1911 | Elected in 1904 to the next term. Lost re-election. | 18 | 61st | 19 | Elected Jan 12, 1909. Retired. | Mar 4, 1909 – Mar 3, 1915 | Republican | Theodore E. Burton (Cleveland) | 21 |
| 15 | Atlee Pomerene (Canton) | Democratic | Mar 4, 1911 – Mar 3, 1923 | Elected Jan 10, 1911. | 19 | 62nd | 19 | Elected Jan 12, 1909. Retired. | Mar 4, 1909 – Mar 3, 1915 | Republican | Theodore E. Burton (Cleveland) | 21 |
| 15 | Atlee Pomerene (Canton) | Democratic | Mar 4, 1911 – Mar 3, 1923 | Elected Jan 10, 1911. | 19 | 63rd | 19 | Elected Jan 12, 1909. Retired. | Mar 4, 1909 – Mar 3, 1915 | Republican | Theodore E. Burton (Cleveland) | 21 |
| 15 | Atlee Pomerene (Canton) | Democratic | Mar 4, 1911 – Mar 3, 1923 | Elected Jan 10, 1911. | 19 | 64th | 20 | Elected in 1914. Resigned, having been elected President of the United States. | Mar 4, 1915 – Jan 13, 1921 | Republican | Warren G. Harding (Marion) | 22 |
| 15 | Atlee Pomerene (Canton) | Democratic | Mar 4, 1911 – Mar 3, 1923 | Re-elected in 1916. Lost re-election. | 20 | 65th | 20 | Elected in 1914. Resigned, having been elected President of the United States. | Mar 4, 1915 – Jan 13, 1921 | Republican | Warren G. Harding (Marion) | 22 |
| 15 | Atlee Pomerene (Canton) | Democratic | Mar 4, 1911 – Mar 3, 1923 | Re-elected in 1916. Lost re-election. | 20 | 66th | 20 | Elected in 1914. Resigned, having been elected President of the United States. | Mar 4, 1915 – Jan 13, 1921 | Republican | Warren G. Harding (Marion) | 22 |
| 15 | Atlee Pomerene (Canton) | Democratic | Mar 4, 1911 – Mar 3, 1923 | Re-elected in 1916. Lost re-election. | 20 | 66th | 20 | Appointed to finish Harding's term, having been elected to the next term. | Jan 14, 1921 – Mar 30, 1928 | Republican | Frank B. Willis (Delaware) | 23 |
| 15 | Atlee Pomerene (Canton) | Democratic | Mar 4, 1911 – Mar 3, 1923 | Re-elected in 1916. Lost re-election. | 20 | 67th | 21 | Elected in 1920. | Jan 14, 1921 – Mar 30, 1928 | Republican | Frank B. Willis (Delaware) | 23 |
| 16 | Simeon D. Fess (Yellow Springs) | Republican | Mar 4, 1923 – Jan 3, 1935 | Elected in 1922. | 21 | 68th | 21 | Elected in 1920. | Jan 14, 1921 – Mar 30, 1928 | Republican | Frank B. Willis (Delaware) | 23 |
| 16 | Simeon D. Fess (Yellow Springs) | Republican | Mar 4, 1923 – Jan 3, 1935 | Elected in 1922. | 21 | 69th | 21 | Elected in 1920. | Jan 14, 1921 – Mar 30, 1928 | Republican | Frank B. Willis (Delaware) | 23 |
| 16 | Simeon D. Fess (Yellow Springs) | Republican | Mar 4, 1923 – Jan 3, 1935 | Elected in 1922. | 21 | 70th | 22 | Re-elected in 1926. Died. | Jan 14, 1921 – Mar 30, 1928 | Republican | Frank B. Willis (Delaware) | 23 |
| 16 | Simeon D. Fess (Yellow Springs) | Republican | Mar 4, 1923 – Jan 3, 1935 | Elected in 1922. | 21 | 70th | 22 | | Mar 30, 1928 – Apr 5, 1928 | Vacant | | |
| 16 | Simeon D. Fess (Yellow Springs) | Republican | Mar 4, 1923 – Jan 3, 1935 | Elected in 1922. | 21 | 70th | 22 | Appointed to continue Willis's term. Lost nomination to finish Willis's term. | Apr 5, 1928 – Dec 14, 1928 | Democratic | Cyrus Locher (Cleveland) | 24 |
| 16 | Simeon D. Fess (Yellow Springs) | Republican | Mar 4, 1923 – Jan 3, 1935 | Elected in 1922. | 21 | 70th | 22 | Elected in 1928 to finish Willis's term. Died. | Dec 15, 1928 – Oct 28, 1929 | Republican | Theodore E. Burton (Cleveland) | 25 |
| 16 | Simeon D. Fess (Yellow Springs) | Republican | Mar 4, 1923 – Jan 3, 1935 | Re-elected in 1928. Lost re-election. | 22 | 71st | 22 | Elected in 1928 to finish Willis's term. Died. | Dec 15, 1928 – Oct 28, 1929 | Republican | Theodore E. Burton (Cleveland) | 25 |
| 16 | Simeon D. Fess (Yellow Springs) | Republican | Mar 4, 1923 – Jan 3, 1935 | Re-elected in 1928. Lost re-election. | 22 | 71st | 22 | | Oct 28, 1929 – Nov 5, 1929 | Vacant | | |
| 16 | Simeon D. Fess (Yellow Springs) | Republican | Mar 4, 1923 – Jan 3, 1935 | Re-elected in 1928. Lost re-election. | 22 | 71st | 22 | Appointed to continue Willis's term. Lost election to finish Willis's term. | Nov 5, 1929 – Nov 30, 1930 | Republican | Roscoe C. McCulloch (Canton) | 26 |
| 16 | Simeon D. Fess (Yellow Springs) | Republican | Mar 4, 1923 – Jan 3, 1935 | Re-elected in 1928. Lost re-election. | 22 | 71st | 22 | Elected in 1930 to finish Willis's term. | Dec 1, 1930 – Jan 3, 1939 | Democratic | Robert J. Bulkley (Cleveland) | 27 |
| 16 | Simeon D. Fess (Yellow Springs) | Republican | Mar 4, 1923 – Jan 3, 1935 | Re-elected in 1928. Lost re-election. | 22 | 72nd | 22 | Elected in 1930 to finish Willis's term. | Dec 1, 1930 – Jan 3, 1939 | Democratic | Robert J. Bulkley (Cleveland) | 27 |
| 16 | Simeon D. Fess (Yellow Springs) | Republican | Mar 4, 1923 – Jan 3, 1935 | Re-elected in 1928. Lost re-election. | 22 | 73rd | 23 | Re-elected in 1932. Lost re-election. | Dec 1, 1930 – Jan 3, 1939 | Democratic | Robert J. Bulkley (Cleveland) | 27 |
| 17 | Vic Donahey (Huntsville) | Democratic | Jan 3, 1935 – Jan 3, 1941 | Elected in 1934. Retired. | 23 | 74th | 23 | Re-elected in 1932. Lost re-election. | Dec 1, 1930 – Jan 3, 1939 | Democratic | Robert J. Bulkley (Cleveland) | 27 |
| 17 | Vic Donahey (Huntsville) | Democratic | Jan 3, 1935 – Jan 3, 1941 | Elected in 1934. Retired. | 23 | 75th | 23 | Re-elected in 1932. Lost re-election. | Dec 1, 1930 – Jan 3, 1939 | Democratic | Robert J. Bulkley (Cleveland) | 27 |
| 17 | Vic Donahey (Huntsville) | Democratic | Jan 3, 1935 – Jan 3, 1941 | Elected in 1934. Retired. | 23 | 76th | 24 | Elected in 1938. | Jan 3, 1939 – Jul 31, 1953 | Republican | Robert A. Taft (Cincinnati) | 28 |
| 18 | Harold H. Burton (Cleveland) | Republican | Jan 3, 1941 – Sep 30, 1945 | Elected in 1940. Resigned when appointed to the U.S. Supreme Court. | 24 | 77th | 24 | Elected in 1938. | Jan 3, 1939 – Jul 31, 1953 | Republican | Robert A. Taft (Cincinnati) | 28 |
| 18 | Harold H. Burton (Cleveland) | Republican | Jan 3, 1941 – Sep 30, 1945 | Elected in 1940. Resigned when appointed to the U.S. Supreme Court. | 24 | 78th | 24 | Elected in 1938. | Jan 3, 1939 – Jul 31, 1953 | Republican | Robert A. Taft (Cincinnati) | 28 |
| 18 | Harold H. Burton (Cleveland) | Republican | Jan 3, 1941 – Sep 30, 1945 | Elected in 1940. Resigned when appointed to the U.S. Supreme Court. | 24 | 79th | 25 | Re-elected in 1944. | Jan 3, 1939 – Jul 31, 1953 | Republican | Robert A. Taft (Cincinnati) | 28 |
| Vacant | | | Sep 30, 1945 – Oct 8, 1945 | | 24 | 79th | 25 | Re-elected in 1944. | Jan 3, 1939 – Jul 31, 1953 | Republican | Robert A. Taft (Cincinnati) | 28 |
| 19 | James W. Huffman (Columbus) | Democratic | Oct 8, 1945 – Nov 5, 1946 | Appointed to continue Burton's term. Retired when successor elected. | 24 | 79th | 25 | Re-elected in 1944. | Jan 3, 1939 – Jul 31, 1953 | Republican | Robert A. Taft (Cincinnati) | 28 |
| 20 | Kingsley Taft (Shaker Heights) | Republican | Nov 5, 1946 – Jan 3, 1947 | Elected in 1946 to finish Burton's term. Retired. | 24 | 79th | 25 | Re-elected in 1944. | Jan 3, 1939 – Jul 31, 1953 | Republican | Robert A. Taft (Cincinnati) | 28 |
| 21 | John W. Bricker (Columbus) | Republican | Jan 3, 1947 – Jan 3, 1959 | Elected in 1946. | 25 | 80th | 25 | Re-elected in 1944. | Jan 3, 1939 – Jul 31, 1953 | Republican | Robert A. Taft (Cincinnati) | 28 |
| 21 | John W. Bricker (Columbus) | Republican | Jan 3, 1947 – Jan 3, 1959 | Elected in 1946. | 25 | 81st | 25 | Re-elected in 1944. | Jan 3, 1939 – Jul 31, 1953 | Republican | Robert A. Taft (Cincinnati) | 28 |
| 21 | John W. Bricker (Columbus) | Republican | Jan 3, 1947 – Jan 3, 1959 | Elected in 1946. | 25 | 82nd | 26 | Re-elected in 1950. Died. | Jan 3, 1939 – Jul 31, 1953 | Republican | Robert A. Taft (Cincinnati) | 28 |
| 21 | John W. Bricker (Columbus) | Republican | Jan 3, 1947 – Jan 3, 1959 | Re-elected in 1952. Lost re-election. | 26 | 83rd | 26 | Re-elected in 1950. Died. | Jan 3, 1939 – Jul 31, 1953 | Republican | Robert A. Taft (Cincinnati) | 28 |
| 21 | John W. Bricker (Columbus) | Republican | Jan 3, 1947 – Jan 3, 1959 | Re-elected in 1952. Lost re-election. | 26 | 83rd | 26 | | Jul 31, 1953 – Nov 10, 1953 | Vacant | | |
| 21 | John W. Bricker (Columbus) | Republican | Jan 3, 1947 – Jan 3, 1959 | Re-elected in 1952. Lost re-election. | 26 | 83rd | 26 | Appointed to continue Taft's term. Lost election to finish Taft's term. | Nov 10, 1953 – Dec 2, 1954 | Democratic | Thomas Burke (Cleveland) | 29 |
| 21 | John W. Bricker (Columbus) | Republican | Jan 3, 1947 – Jan 3, 1959 | Re-elected in 1952. Lost re-election. | 26 | 83rd | 26 | | Dec 2, 1954 – Dec 16, 1954 | Vacant | | |
| 21 | John W. Bricker (Columbus) | Republican | Jan 3, 1947 – Jan 3, 1959 | Re-elected in 1952. Lost re-election. | 26 | 83rd | 26 | Elected in 1954 to finish Taft's term. Lost re-election. | Dec 16, 1954 – Jan 3, 1957 | Republican | George H. Bender (Chagrin Falls) | 30 |
| 21 | John W. Bricker (Columbus) | Republican | Jan 3, 1947 – Jan 3, 1959 | Re-elected in 1952. Lost re-election. | 26 | 84th | 26 | Elected in 1954 to finish Taft's term. Lost re-election. | Dec 16, 1954 – Jan 3, 1957 | Republican | George H. Bender (Chagrin Falls) | 30 |
| 21 | John W. Bricker (Columbus) | Republican | Jan 3, 1947 – Jan 3, 1959 | Re-elected in 1952. Lost re-election. | 26 | 85th | 27 | Elected in 1956. | Jan 3, 1957 – Jan 3, 1969 | Democratic | Frank Lausche (Cleveland) | 31 |
| 22 | Stephen M. Young (Cleveland) | Democratic | Jan 3, 1959 – Jan 3, 1971 | Elected in 1958. | 27 | 86th | 27 | Elected in 1956. | Jan 3, 1957 – Jan 3, 1969 | Democratic | Frank Lausche (Cleveland) | 31 |
| 22 | Stephen M. Young (Cleveland) | Democratic | Jan 3, 1959 – Jan 3, 1971 | Elected in 1958. | 27 | 87th | 27 | Elected in 1956. | Jan 3, 1957 – Jan 3, 1969 | Democratic | Frank Lausche (Cleveland) | 31 |
| 22 | Stephen M. Young (Cleveland) | Democratic | Jan 3, 1959 – Jan 3, 1971 | Elected in 1958. | 27 | 88th | 28 | Re-elected in 1962. Lost renomination. | Jan 3, 1957 – Jan 3, 1969 | Democratic | Frank Lausche (Cleveland) | 31 |
| 22 | Stephen M. Young (Cleveland) | Democratic | Jan 3, 1959 – Jan 3, 1971 | Re-elected in 1964. Retired. | 28 | 89th | 28 | Re-elected in 1962. Lost renomination. | Jan 3, 1957 – Jan 3, 1969 | Democratic | Frank Lausche (Cleveland) | 31 |
| 22 | Stephen M. Young (Cleveland) | Democratic | Jan 3, 1959 – Jan 3, 1971 | Re-elected in 1964. Retired. | 28 | 90th | 28 | Re-elected in 1962. Lost renomination. | Jan 3, 1957 – Jan 3, 1969 | Democratic | Frank Lausche (Cleveland) | 31 |
| 22 | Stephen M. Young (Cleveland) | Democratic | Jan 3, 1959 – Jan 3, 1971 | Re-elected in 1964. Retired. | 28 | 91st | 29 | Elected in 1968. Resigned to become U.S. Attorney General. | Jan 3, 1969 – Jan 3, 1974 | Republican | William Saxbe (Mechanicsburg) | 32 |
| 23 | Robert Taft Jr. (Cincinnati) | Republican | Jan 3, 1971 – Dec 28, 1976 | Elected in 1970. Lost re-election and resigned early. | 29 | 92nd | 29 | Elected in 1968. Resigned to become U.S. Attorney General. | Jan 3, 1969 – Jan 3, 1974 | Republican | William Saxbe (Mechanicsburg) | 32 |
| 23 | Robert Taft Jr. (Cincinnati) | Republican | Jan 3, 1971 – Dec 28, 1976 | Elected in 1970. Lost re-election and resigned early. | 29 | 93rd | 29 | Elected in 1968. Resigned to become U.S. Attorney General. | Jan 3, 1969 – Jan 3, 1974 | Republican | William Saxbe (Mechanicsburg) | 32 |
| 23 | Robert Taft Jr. (Cincinnati) | Republican | Jan 3, 1971 – Dec 28, 1976 | Elected in 1970. Lost re-election and resigned early. | 29 | 93rd | 29 | Appointed to finish Saxbe's term. Lost nomination to full term and resigned early. | Jan 4, 1974 – Dec 23, 1974 | Democratic | Howard Metzenbaum (Cleveland) | 33 |
| 23 | Robert Taft Jr. (Cincinnati) | Republican | Jan 3, 1971 – Dec 28, 1976 | Elected in 1970. Lost re-election and resigned early. | 29 | 93rd | 29 | Appointed to finish Saxbe's term, having been elected to the next term. | Dec 24, 1974 – Jan 3, 1999 | Democratic | John Glenn (Columbus) | 34 |
| 23 | Robert Taft Jr. (Cincinnati) | Republican | Jan 3, 1971 – Dec 28, 1976 | Elected in 1970. Lost re-election and resigned early. | 29 | 94th | 30 | Elected in 1974. | Dec 24, 1974 – Jan 3, 1999 | Democratic | John Glenn (Columbus) | 34 |
| 24 | Howard Metzenbaum (Lyndhurst) | Democratic | Dec 29, 1976 – Jan 3, 1995 | Appointed to finish Taft's term, having been elected to the next term. | 29 | 94th | 30 | Elected in 1974. | Dec 24, 1974 – Jan 3, 1999 | Democratic | John Glenn (Columbus) | 34 |
| 24 | Howard Metzenbaum (Lyndhurst) | Democratic | Dec 29, 1976 – Jan 3, 1995 | Elected in 1976. | 30 | 95th | 30 | Elected in 1974. | Dec 24, 1974 – Jan 3, 1999 | Democratic | John Glenn (Columbus) | 34 |
| 24 | Howard Metzenbaum (Lyndhurst) | Democratic | Dec 29, 1976 – Jan 3, 1995 | Elected in 1976. | 30 | 96th | 30 | Elected in 1974. | Dec 24, 1974 – Jan 3, 1999 | Democratic | John Glenn (Columbus) | 34 |
| 24 | Howard Metzenbaum (Lyndhurst) | Democratic | Dec 29, 1976 – Jan 3, 1995 | Elected in 1976. | 30 | 97th | 31 | Re-elected in 1980. | Dec 24, 1974 – Jan 3, 1999 | Democratic | John Glenn (Columbus) | 34 |
| 24 | Howard Metzenbaum (Lyndhurst) | Democratic | Dec 29, 1976 – Jan 3, 1995 | Re-elected in 1982. | 31 | 98th | 31 | Re-elected in 1980. | Dec 24, 1974 – Jan 3, 1999 | Democratic | John Glenn (Columbus) | 34 |
| 24 | Howard Metzenbaum (Lyndhurst) | Democratic | Dec 29, 1976 – Jan 3, 1995 | Re-elected in 1982. | 31 | 99th | 31 | Re-elected in 1980. | Dec 24, 1974 – Jan 3, 1999 | Democratic | John Glenn (Columbus) | 34 |
| 24 | Howard Metzenbaum (Lyndhurst) | Democratic | Dec 29, 1976 – Jan 3, 1995 | Re-elected in 1982. | 31 | 100th | 32 | Re-elected in 1986. | Dec 24, 1974 – Jan 3, 1999 | Democratic | John Glenn (Columbus) | 34 |
| 24 | Howard Metzenbaum (Lyndhurst) | Democratic | Dec 29, 1976 – Jan 3, 1995 | Re-elected in 1988. Retired. | 32 | 101st | 32 | Re-elected in 1986. | Dec 24, 1974 – Jan 3, 1999 | Democratic | John Glenn (Columbus) | 34 |
| 24 | Howard Metzenbaum (Lyndhurst) | Democratic | Dec 29, 1976 – Jan 3, 1995 | Re-elected in 1988. Retired. | 32 | 102nd | 32 | Re-elected in 1986. | Dec 24, 1974 – Jan 3, 1999 | Democratic | John Glenn (Columbus) | 34 |
| 24 | Howard Metzenbaum (Lyndhurst) | Democratic | Dec 29, 1976 – Jan 3, 1995 | Re-elected in 1988. Retired. | 32 | 103rd | 33 | Re-elected in 1992. Retired. | Dec 24, 1974 – Jan 3, 1999 | Democratic | John Glenn (Columbus) | 34 |
| 25 | Mike DeWine (Columbus) | Republican | Jan 3, 1995 – Jan 3, 2007 | Elected in 1994. | 33 | 104th | 33 | Re-elected in 1992. Retired. | Dec 24, 1974 – Jan 3, 1999 | Democratic | John Glenn (Columbus) | 34 |
| 25 | Mike DeWine (Columbus) | Republican | Jan 3, 1995 – Jan 3, 2007 | Elected in 1994. | 33 | 105th | 33 | Re-elected in 1992. Retired. | Dec 24, 1974 – Jan 3, 1999 | Democratic | John Glenn (Columbus) | 34 |
| 25 | Mike DeWine (Columbus) | Republican | Jan 3, 1995 – Jan 3, 2007 | Elected in 1994. | 33 | 106th | 34 | Elected in 1998. | Jan 3, 1999 – Jan 3, 2011 | Republican | George Voinovich (Cleveland) | 35 |
| 25 | Mike DeWine (Columbus) | Republican | Jan 3, 1995 – Jan 3, 2007 | Re-elected in 2000. Lost re-election. | 34 | 107th | 34 | Elected in 1998. | Jan 3, 1999 – Jan 3, 2011 | Republican | George Voinovich (Cleveland) | 35 |
| 25 | Mike DeWine (Columbus) | Republican | Jan 3, 1995 – Jan 3, 2007 | Re-elected in 2000. Lost re-election. | 34 | 108th | 34 | Elected in 1998. | Jan 3, 1999 – Jan 3, 2011 | Republican | George Voinovich (Cleveland) | 35 |
| 25 | Mike DeWine (Columbus) | Republican | Jan 3, 1995 – Jan 3, 2007 | Re-elected in 2000. Lost re-election. | 34 | 109th | 35 | Re-elected in 2004. Retired. | Jan 3, 1999 – Jan 3, 2011 | Republican | George Voinovich (Cleveland) | 35 |
| 26 | Sherrod Brown (Lorain) | Democratic | Jan 3, 2007 – Jan 3, 2025 | Elected in 2006. | 35 | 110th | 35 | Re-elected in 2004. Retired. | Jan 3, 1999 – Jan 3, 2011 | Republican | George Voinovich (Cleveland) | 35 |
| 26 | Sherrod Brown (Lorain) | Democratic | Jan 3, 2007 – Jan 3, 2025 | Elected in 2006. | 35 | 111th | 35 | Re-elected in 2004. Retired. | Jan 3, 1999 – Jan 3, 2011 | Republican | George Voinovich (Cleveland) | 35 |
| 26 | Sherrod Brown (Lorain) | Democratic | Jan 3, 2007 – Jan 3, 2025 | Elected in 2006. | 35 | 112th | 36 | Elected in 2010. | Jan 3, 2011 – Jan 3, 2023 | Republican | Rob Portman (Terrace Park) | 36 |
| 26 | Sherrod Brown (Lorain) | Democratic | Jan 3, 2007 – Jan 3, 2025 | Re-elected in 2012. | 36 | 113th | 36 | Elected in 2010. | Jan 3, 2011 – Jan 3, 2023 | Republican | Rob Portman (Terrace Park) | 36 |
| 26 | Sherrod Brown (Lorain) | Democratic | Jan 3, 2007 – Jan 3, 2025 | Re-elected in 2012. | 36 | 114th | 36 | Elected in 2010. | Jan 3, 2011 – Jan 3, 2023 | Republican | Rob Portman (Terrace Park) | 36 |
| 26 | Sherrod Brown (Lorain) | Democratic | Jan 3, 2007 – Jan 3, 2025 | Re-elected in 2012. | 36 | 115th | 37 | Re-elected in 2016. Retired. | Jan 3, 2011 – Jan 3, 2023 | Republican | Rob Portman (Terrace Park) | 36 |
| 26 | Sherrod Brown (Lorain) | Democratic | Jan 3, 2007 – Jan 3, 2025 | Re-elected in 2018. Lost re-election. | 37 | 116th | 37 | Re-elected in 2016. Retired. | Jan 3, 2011 – Jan 3, 2023 | Republican | Rob Portman (Terrace Park) | 36 |
| 26 | Sherrod Brown (Lorain) | Democratic | Jan 3, 2007 – Jan 3, 2025 | Re-elected in 2018. Lost re-election. | 37 | 117th | 37 | Re-elected in 2016. Retired. | Jan 3, 2011 – Jan 3, 2023 | Republican | Rob Portman (Terrace Park) | 36 |
| 26 | Sherrod Brown (Lorain) | Democratic | Jan 3, 2007 – Jan 3, 2025 | Re-elected in 2018. Lost re-election. | 37 | 118th | 38 | Elected in 2022. Resigned to become Vice President of the United States. | Jan 3, 2023 – Jan 10, 2025 | Republican | JD Vance (Cincinnati) | 37 |
| 27 | Bernie Moreno (Westlake) | Republican | Jan 3, 2025 – present | Elected in 2024. | 38 | 119th | 38 | Elected in 2022. Resigned to become Vice President of the United States. | Jan 3, 2023 – Jan 10, 2025 | Republican | JD Vance (Cincinnati) | 37 |
| 27 | Bernie Moreno (Westlake) | Republican | Jan 3, 2025 – present | Elected in 2024. | 38 | 119th | 38 | | Jan 10, 2025 – Jan 18, 2025 | Vacant | | |
| 27 | Bernie Moreno (Westlake) | Republican | Jan 3, 2025 – present | Elected in 2024. | 38 | 119th | 38 | Appointed to continue Vance's term. Lost election to finish Vance's term. | Jan 18, 2025 – present | Republican | Jon Husted (Upper Arlington) | 38 |
| 27 | Bernie Moreno (Westlake) | Republican | Jan 3, 2025 – present | Elected in 2024. | 38 | 119th | 38 | Elected in 2026 to finish Vance's term. | Taking office Dec 15, 2026 | Democratic | Sherrod Brown (elect) (Bexley) | 39 |
| 27 | Bernie Moreno (Westlake) | Republican | Jan 3, 2025 – present | Elected in 2024. | 38 | 120th | 38 | Elected in 2026 to finish Vance's term. | Taking office Dec 15, 2026 | Democratic | Sherrod Brown (elect) (Bexley) | 39 |
| 27 | Bernie Moreno (Westlake) | Republican | Jan 3, 2025 – present | Elected in 2024. | 38 | 121st | 39 | To be determined in the 2028 election. | | | | |
| To be determined in the 2030 election. | | | | | 39 | 122nd | 39 | To be determined in the 2028 election. | | | | |

== See also ==
- List of United States representatives from Ohio
- List of United States Senate elections in Ohio
- Ohio's congressional delegations
