= 2028 United States Senate election in Ohio =

- November 7, 2028
Party	Democratic	Republican
Incumbent U.S. senator
Sherrod Brown (Note: JD Vance, who was elected in this seat in the previous regular election, was elected Vice President of the United States in the 2024 presidential election. He resigned his Senate seat on January 10, 2025. Governor Mike DeWine appointed Lieutenant Governor Jon Husted to fill in Vance's seat as his interim successor. However, Husted lost to Brown in the 2026 special election, therefore Brown will serve the remainder of Vance's term.)
Democratic

The 2028 United States Senate election in Ohio will be held on November 7, 2028, to elect a member of the United States Senate to represent the state of Ohio. Incumbent senator Sherrod Brown, who defeated Husted in the 2026 special election to serve out the remainder of JD Vance's term, has filed paperwork to run for re-election, although he has not publicly declared on whether he'll seek a full term or not.

This race is expected to be competitive, as Brown is one of five Democratic senators up for re-election in states that were won by Trump in 2024, and the only Democratic senator up for re-election in a double-digit Trump state. It is also viewed as one of the best pickup opportunities for Republicans if they want to take back the Senate in 2028.

== Background ==
In 2024, Ohio's U.S. Senate delegation went under a massive change. JD Vance, who held this seat from 2023 to 2025, was elected Vice President of the United States in the 2024 presidential election. Therefore, he resigned his seat to assumed the role on January 10, 2025, leaving Governor Mike DeWine to appoint Jon Husted to fill in Vance's seat. However, Husted would have to run in the 2026 special election in order to serve the remainder of Vance's term. Sherrod Brown the other Senator, lost re-election to businessman Bernie Moreno. For the first time since 2007, Ohio's Senate delegation was fully Republican. Nonetheless, Ohio is considered a moderately red state at the federal and state levels. Republicans have comfortably won the last three Presidential elections in the state, and continue to control both houses of the Ohio Legislature.

In August 2025, Brown decided to run in the special election against Husted. Brown would then go onto defeat Husted in the special election, pulling off a surprising political comeback and returning to the U.S. Senate. This led to Ohio return to a split Senate delegation again.

== Democratic primary ==
=== Candidates ===
==== Filed paperwork ====
- Sherrod Brown, incumbent U.S. senator

==== Potential ====
- Justin Bibb, mayor of Cleveland (2022–present)

==== Declined ====
- Tim Ryan, former U.S. representative from Ohio's 13th congressional district (2003–2023) and nominee for U.S. senate in 2022

== Republican primary ==
=== Candidates ===
==== Potential ====
- Kevin Coughlin, former state senator from the 27th district (2001–2010), candidate for U.S. senate in 2012, nominee for Ohio's 13th congressional district in 2024, and candidate in 2026
- Jon Husted, outgoing U.S. senator (2025–present)
- Mike Turner, outgoing U.S. representative from Ohio's 10th congressional district (2003–present)
- JD Vance, vice president of the United States (2025–present) and former U.S. senator (2023–2025)
