= Howard Metzenbaum =

American politician and businessman (1917–2008)

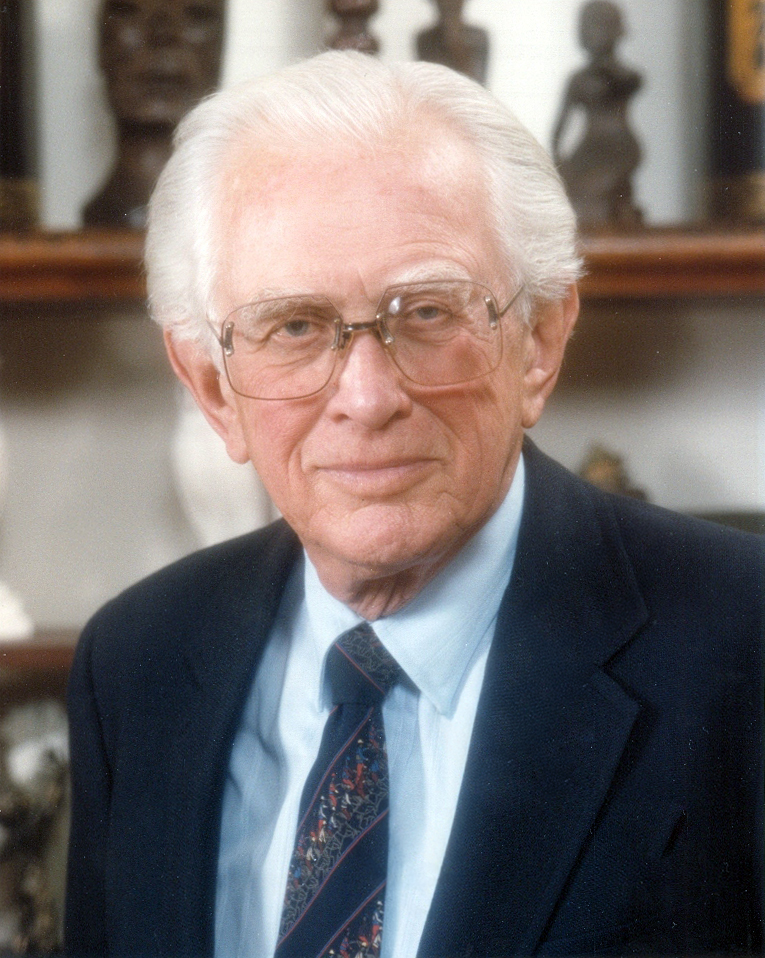
- Official portrait, 1991

United States Senator from Ohio
- In office December 29, 1976 – January 3, 1995
- Preceded by: Robert Taft Jr.
- Succeeded by: Mike DeWine
- In office January 4, 1974 – December 23, 1974
- Appointed by: John J. Gilligan
- Preceded by: William B. Saxbe
- Succeeded by: John Glenn

Member of the Ohio Senate from the 25th district
- In office 1947–1951
- Succeeded by: Anthony J. Celebrezze

Member of the Ohio House of Representatives
- In office 1943–1947

Personal details
- Born: Howard Morton Metzenbaum; June 4, 1917 Cleveland, Ohio, U.S.
- Died: March 12, 2008 (aged 90) Aventura, Florida, U.S.
- Resting place: Mayfield Cemetery
- Party: Democratic
- Spouse: Shirley Turoff (m. 1947)
- Children: 4, including Shelley
- Education: Ohio State University (BA, LLB)

Howard Morton Metzenbaum (June 4, 1917 – March 12, 2008) was an American politician and businessman who served as a United States senator from Ohio in 1974, and again from 1976 to 1995. A member of the Democratic Party, he also served in the Ohio General Assembly from 1943 to 1951.

== Early life and education ==
Metzenbaum was born June 4, 1917, in Cleveland, Ohio, to a poor family, the son of Anna (née Klafter) and Charles I. Metzenbaum. His paternal grandparents were Jewish immigrants from Poland and France, and his maternal grandparents were Hungarian Jews. He attended Glenville High School, where he ran track, while also working odd jobs after hours. He graduated from Ohio State University, receiving a bachelor's degree in 1939 and a law degree in 1941. During the 1940s, he practiced law in Cleveland. After initially facing discrimination due to his Jewish heritage, he found acceptance representing large labor unions, first with the Communications Workers of America and later the International Association of Machinists.

== Business career and Ohio legislature ==
Metzenbaum became independently wealthy through investments, particularly in real estate near what became the Cleveland Hopkins International Airport, which Metzenbaum and his partner, Alva "Ted" Bonda, correctly envisioned would make for extremely profitable, 24-hour, well-lit parking lots. The business expanded to become Airport Parking Company of America (APCOA), the world's largest parking lot company. By 1970, he had sold his interest in APCOA Parking for $20 million (equivalent to $166 million in 2025).

Metzenbaum served in the Ohio House of Representatives from 1943 to 1947. He then served in the Ohio Senate from 1947 to 1951. In 1958, he served as the campaign manager for future U.S. Senator Stephen M. Young, who, in a major upset, narrowly unseated incumbent Senator John Bricker, the Republican Party's 1944 vice presidential nominee. He returned to assist Young in his successful reelection campaign in 1964.

In January 1968, Metzenbaum and Bonda purchased the Cleveland Stokers soccer club from Cleveland Indians executives Vernon Stouffer and Gabe Paul. Under their leadership, the team played one year in the North American Soccer League, and even won their division, before departing the league due to differences in business philosophy with the other owners.

In the early 1970s, Metzenbaum also co-owned the Sun Newspapers chain of weeklies which covered the Cleveland suburbs, a venture undertaken after his first senatorial election defeat.

== U.S. Senate (1974, 1976–1995) ==
=== Elections ===
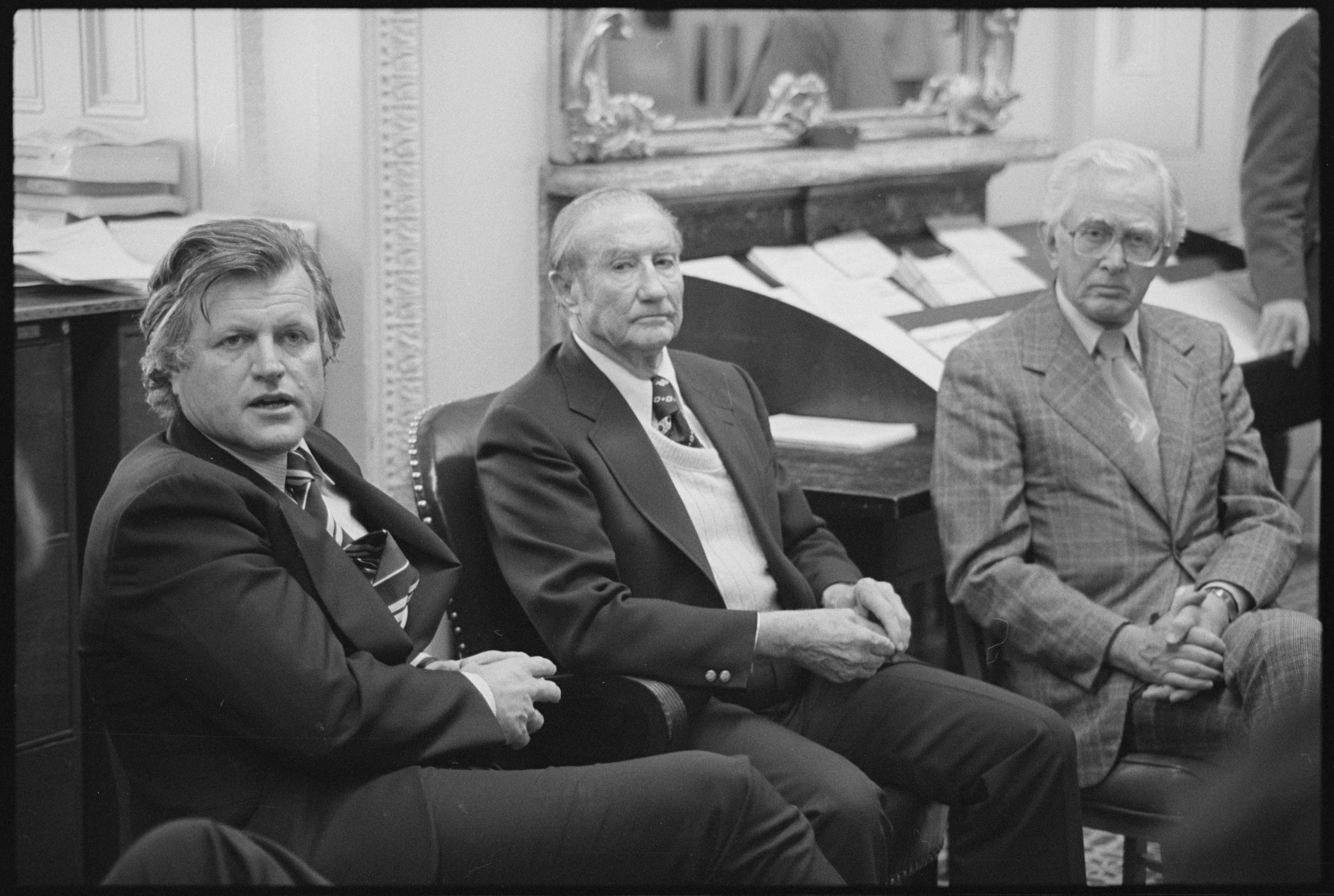
Metzenbaum (right) with Senators Ted Kennedy and Strom Thurmond in 1979

In 1970, Metzenbaum ran for the Senate seat vacated by Young, who chose not to run for a third term. He beat astronaut John Glenn in the Democratic primary by a close 46% to 45% margin, but narrowly lost to Robert Taft Jr. in the general election.

In 1974, when Senator William B. Saxbe resigned from his seat to accept the nomination as U.S. attorney general, Governor John J. Gilligan appointed Metzenbaum to serve the remainder of Saxbe's term. Metzenbaum ran for election to the seat, but in a bitter Democratic primary, lost to Glenn, who subsequently won the general election by a landslide. In the primary, Metzenbaum contrasted his strong business background with Glenn's military and astronaut credentials, saying his opponent had "never worked for a living." John Glenn had served in the Marine Corps for 23 years. Glenn's reply came to be known as the "Gold Star Mothers" speech. He told Metzenbaum to go to a veterans' hospital and "look those men with mangled bodies in the eyes and tell them they didn't hold a job. You go with me to any Gold Star mother and you look her in the eye and tell her that her son did not hold a job". Many felt the "Gold Star Mothers" speech won the primary for Glenn, which he won by 54% to 46%.

In 1976, Metzenbaum sought a rematch against Taft. The race was close again, but this time he won, riding on Jimmy Carter's coattails. Taft resigned the seat a few days before his term ended, allowing Metzenbaum to be sworn in a few days early and hence have a small edge in seniority over other senators newly elected in 1976. He was reelected in 1982, comfortably defeating Republican state Senator Paul Pfeifer. That same year, Metzenbaum's cousin, Harriett Woods, ran against Metzenbaum's Republican colleague, John Danforth, for Danforth's U.S. Senate seat in Missouri. Danforth defeated Woods by a margin of less than two percentage points.

In 1988, Metzenbaum was opposed by Cleveland mayor George Voinovich. Voinovich accused Metzenbaum of being soft on child pornography. Voinovich's charges were criticized by many, including Glenn, who recorded a statement for television refuting Voinovich's charges. Metzenbaum won the election by 57% to 43%, even as George H. W. Bush won Ohio's electoral votes by roughly 11 percentage points. Ten years later, Voinovich was elected to Glenn's U.S. Senate seat after Glenn's retirement.

Metzenbaum did not run for reelection in 1994. His son-in-law Joel Hyatt was nominated by the Democrats to replace him, but Hyatt lost to Lieutenant Governor Mike DeWine, who had been elected as Voinovich's running mate in 1990.

=== Tenure ===
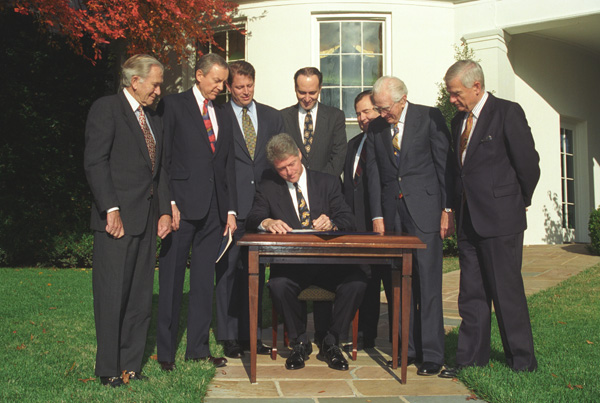
Metzenbaum (second from right) at the signing of the Religious Freedom Restoration Act by President Bill Clinton in 1993

While in the Senate, Metzenbaum was a powerful liberal. He was known as "Senator No" (a nickname shared by Republican Jesse Helms of North Carolina) and "Headline Howard" and a "headline hog" due to his ability to filibuster bills by offering scores of amendments as well as blocking hidden special-interest legislation. Metzenbaum took a particular interest in antitrust and consumer protection issues, often threatening to repeal the antitrust law exemption given to Major League Baseball. Since his retirement, the issue has gone largely unaddressed. Metzenbaum became well known for his service on the Senate Judiciary Committee, particularly because of his efforts to keep stringent antitrust laws and his pro-choice stance on abortion.

Metzenbaum was skeptical of corporations and agencies promoting aspartame. An allegation was that the G. D. Searle & Company was trying to bring aspartame to market and get it approved by the U.S. Food and Drug Administration (FDA) by submitting false data. Metzenbaum berated Searle's fabricated tests and also faulted the American Medical Association (AMA), whose Journal of the American Medical Association (JAMA) reported, with some significant disclaimers, that aspartame was safe for most people. Of the report, Metzenbaum said, "I wish that this [JAMA] report could ease my concerns. It does not. It merely restates the FDA position, which relies solely on the Searle tests. As I have indicated these tests are under a cloud. In addition, the concerns raised recently by the scientists...were not even included in the report." In 1985, the U.S. Senate heard testimony relating to an amendment by Metzenbaum that would require the quantity of aspartame in a product to be labeled.

In 1981, Metzenbaum was insulted on the floor of the Senate when Senator Ernest Hollings of South Carolina called him the "senator from B'nai B'rith". Some interpreted this as a slur on Metzenbaum's Jewish faith. Hollings later apologized to Metzenbaum and the remarks were stricken from the record.

On December 2, 1981, Metzenbaum was one of four senators to vote against an amendment to President Ronald Reagan's MX missiles proposal that would divert the silo system by $334 million as well as earmark further research for other methods that would allow giant missiles to be based. The vote was seen as a rebuff of the Reagan administration.

In the late 1970s and early 1980s, Glenn and Metzenbaum had strained relations. There was a thaw in 1983 when Metzenbaum endorsed Glenn for president.

== Retirement ==
After leaving the Senate in 1995, Metzenbaum served as the chairman of the Consumer Federation of America. He died at his home in Aventura, Florida on March 12, 2008. He is buried at Mayfield Cemetery in Cleveland Heights, Ohio.

Denying urban legends to the contrary, Metzenbaum said he was never affiliated with the Communist Party. When the National Republican Senatorial Committee suggested in 1987 that he had "Communist sympathies", Chairman Rudy Boschwitz apologized for the smear.

Metzenbaum's cousin James Metzenbaum was an Ohio attorney who wrote a text on zoning law and once ran for a seat on the Ohio Supreme Court.

== Personal life and legacy ==
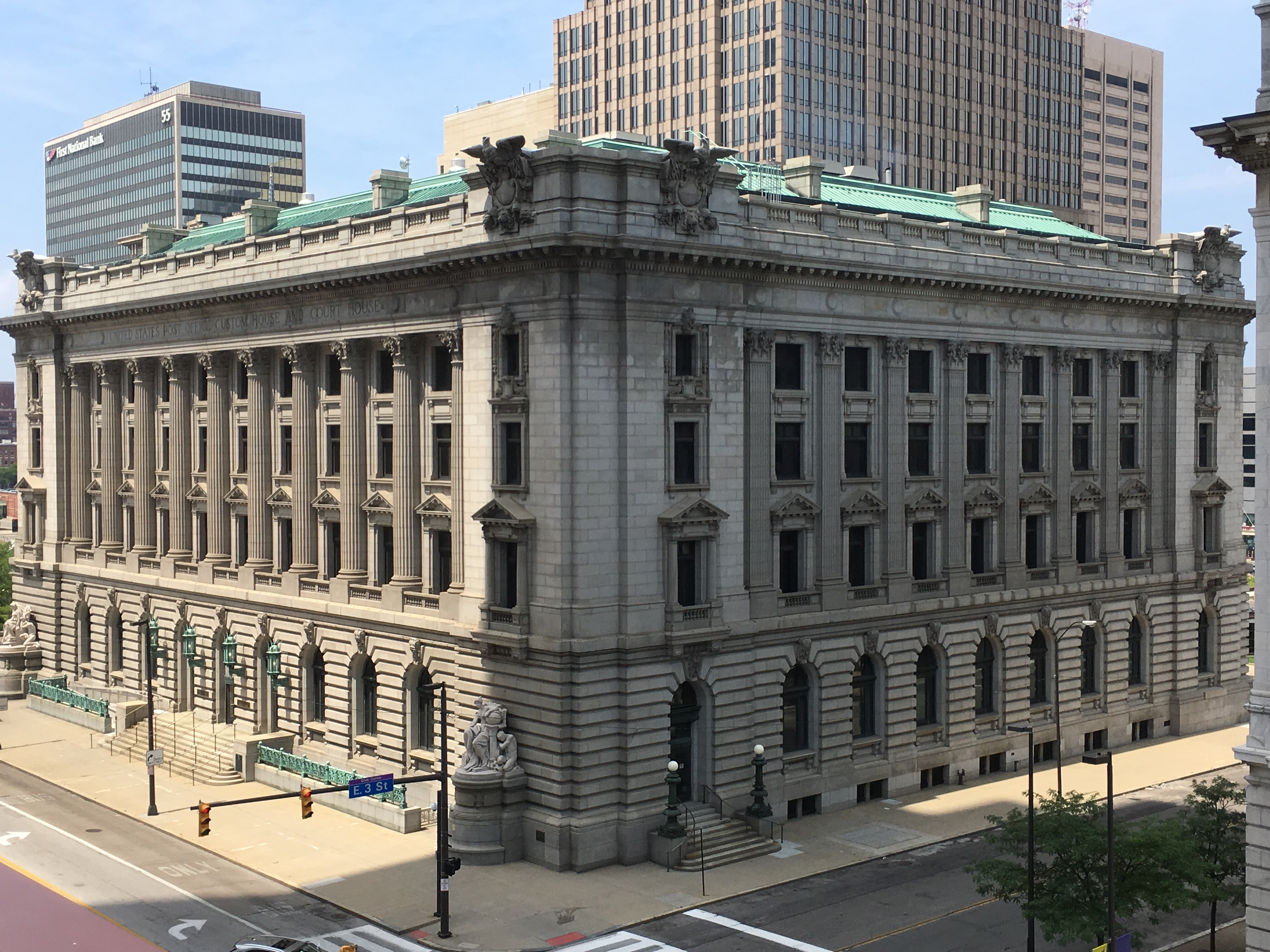
The Howard M. Metzenbaum United States Courthouse in Cleveland

Metzenbaum married Shirley Louise Turoff (1923–2019) on August 8, 1946. They had four daughters: Barbara, Susan, Shelley, and Amy. Susan married Joel Hyatt.

Metzenbaum was behind several pieces of enacted legislation during his senatorial career. These included the Worker Adjustment and Retraining Notification Act, which required warning periods for large factory closures; the Brady Law, which established a waiting period for handgun purchases; and the Howard M. Metzenbaum Multiethnic Placement Act of 1994 (MEPA) (U.S. Public Law 103-82), which prohibits federally subsidized adoption agencies from delaying or denying child placement on grounds of race or ethnicity.

On May 27, 1998, the Old Federal Building and Post Office in downtown Cleveland was renamed the Howard M. Metzenbaum United States Courthouse in his honor.

== In popular culture ==
- Metzenbaum was referenced in the Space Ghost Coast to Coast episode "Switcheroo". Space Ghost mentioned him as a guest whom his staff had forgotten to book.
- Metzenbaum had a cameo in the 1993 film Dave.

== See also ==
- List of Jewish members of the United States Congress

Party political offices
Preceded by Stephen M. Young	Democratic nominee for U.S. Senator from Ohio (Class 1); 1970, 1976, 1982, 1988	Succeeded by Joel Hyatt
U.S. Senate
Preceded by William B. Saxbe	U.S. senator (Class 3) from Ohio; 1974; Served alongside: Robert Taft	Succeeded by John H. Glenn Jr.
Preceded by Robert Taft Jr.	U.S. senator (Class 1) from Ohio; 1976–1995; Served alongside: John Glenn	Succeeded by R. Michael DeWine
