= 1988 United States Senate election in Ohio =

- November 8, 1988
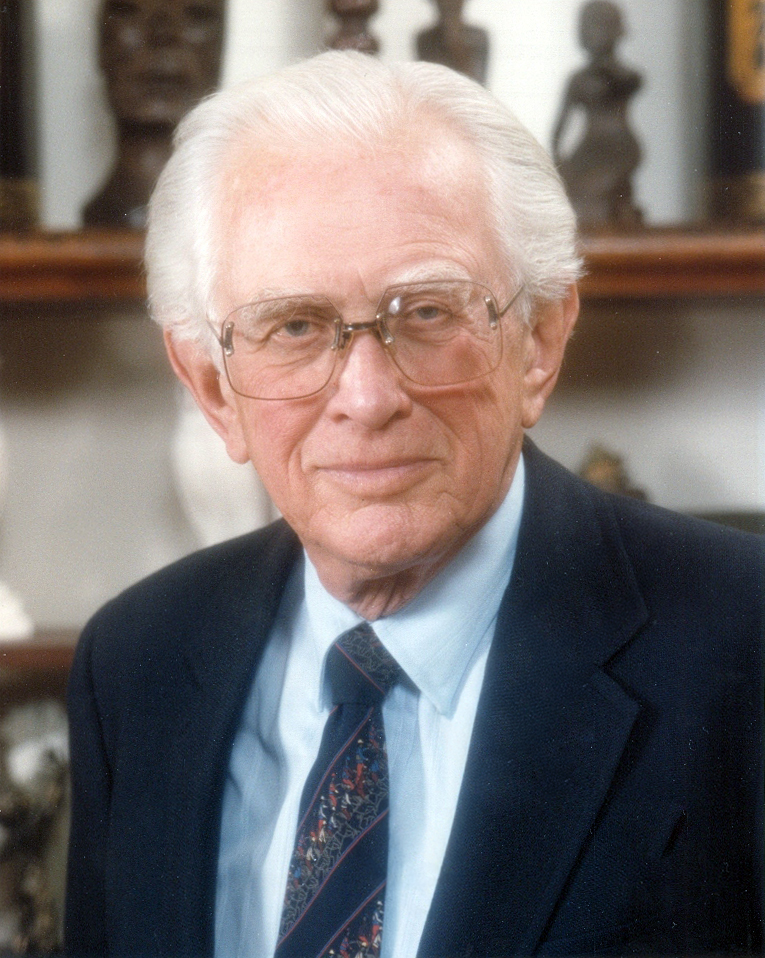

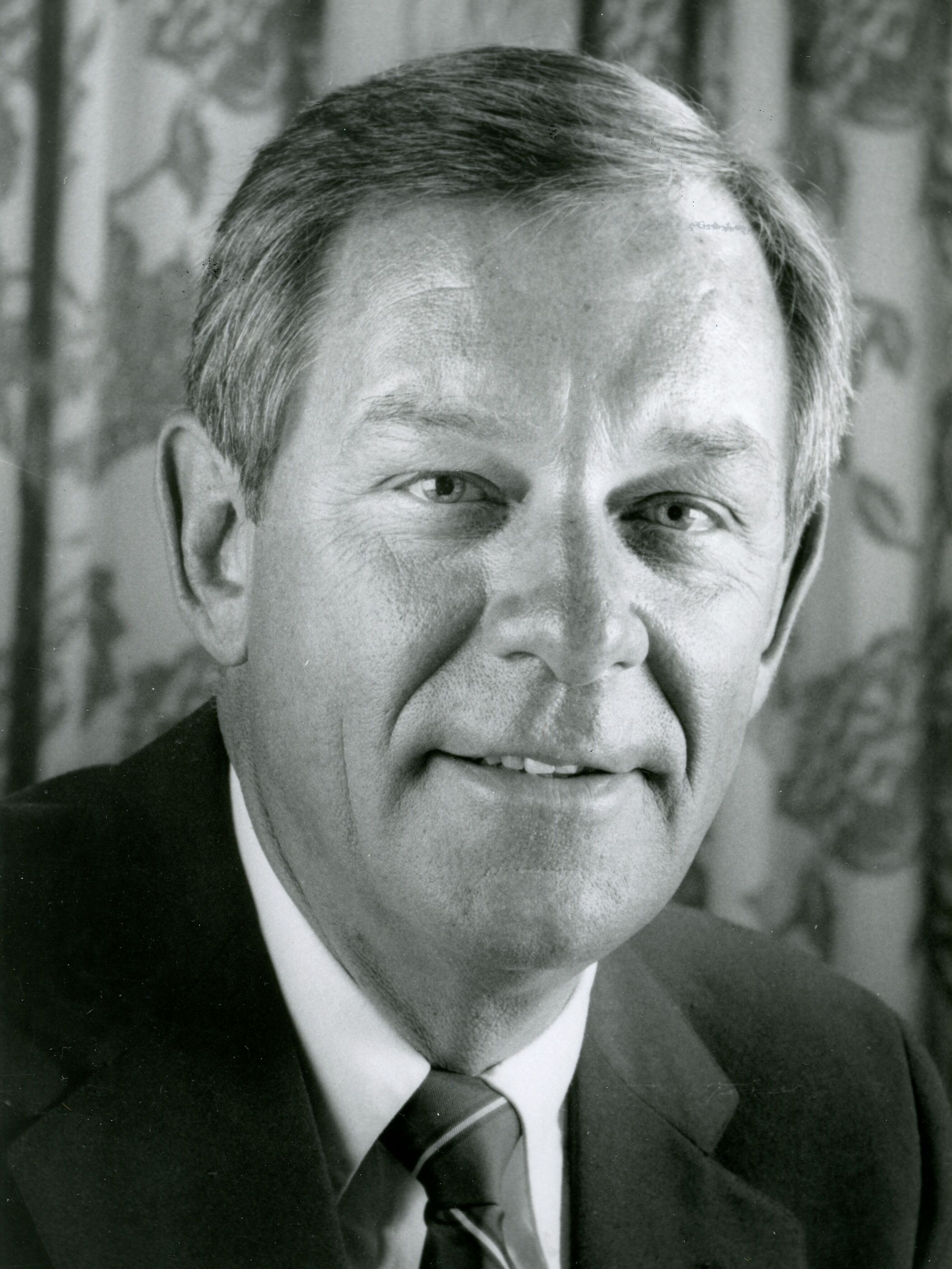
Nominee	Howard Metzenbaum	George Voinovich
Party	Democratic	Republican
Popular vote	2,480,038	1,872,716
Percentage	56.97%	42.31%
- Metzenbaum: 50–60% 60–70% 70–80% Voinovich: 50–60% 60–70%
U.S. senator before election
Howard Metzenbaum
Democratic
Elected U.S. Senator
Howard Metzenbaum
Democratic

The 1988 United States Senate election in Ohio was held on November 8, 1988. Incumbent Democratic U.S. Senator Howard Metzenbaum won re-election. Metzenbaum easily won the Democratic nomination with over 80% of the vote, while Cleveland Mayor George Voinovich was uncontested in his primary. This was the last time Democrats won this seat until 2006. Voinovich later served as Ohio's Governor from 1991 to 1998 and held the state's other U.S. Senate seat from 1999 to 2011. As of 2024, 1988 remains the last time that Ohio voted for different parties in concurrent presidential and Senate elections.

== Major candidates ==
=== Democratic ===
- Howard Metzenbaum, incumbent U.S. Senator

Democratic primary results
Party	Candidate	Votes	%
Democratic	Howard Metzenbaum	1,070,934	83.57%
Democratic	Ralph Applegate	210,508	16.43%
Total votes		1,281,442	100.00%

=== Republican ===
- George Voinovich, Mayor of Cleveland and former Lieutenant Governor of Ohio

Republican primary results
Party	Candidate	Votes	%
Republican	George Voinovich	636,806	100.00%
Total votes		636,806	100.00%

== Results ==
1988 United States Senate election in Ohio
Party	Candidate	Votes	%
Democratic	Howard Metzenbaum (incumbent)	2,480,038	56.97%
Republican	George Voinovich	1,872,716	42.31%
Independent	David Marshall	151	0.00%
Majority		607,322	14.66%
Turnout		4,352,905	100.00%
Democratic hold			

== See also ==
- 1988 United States Senate elections
