= 1922 United States Senate election in Ohio =

- November 7, 1922
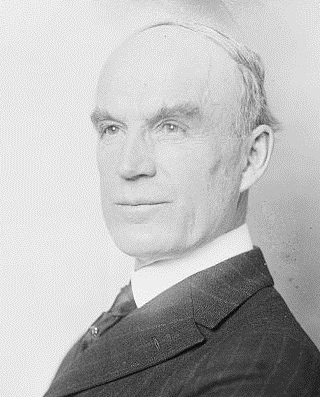

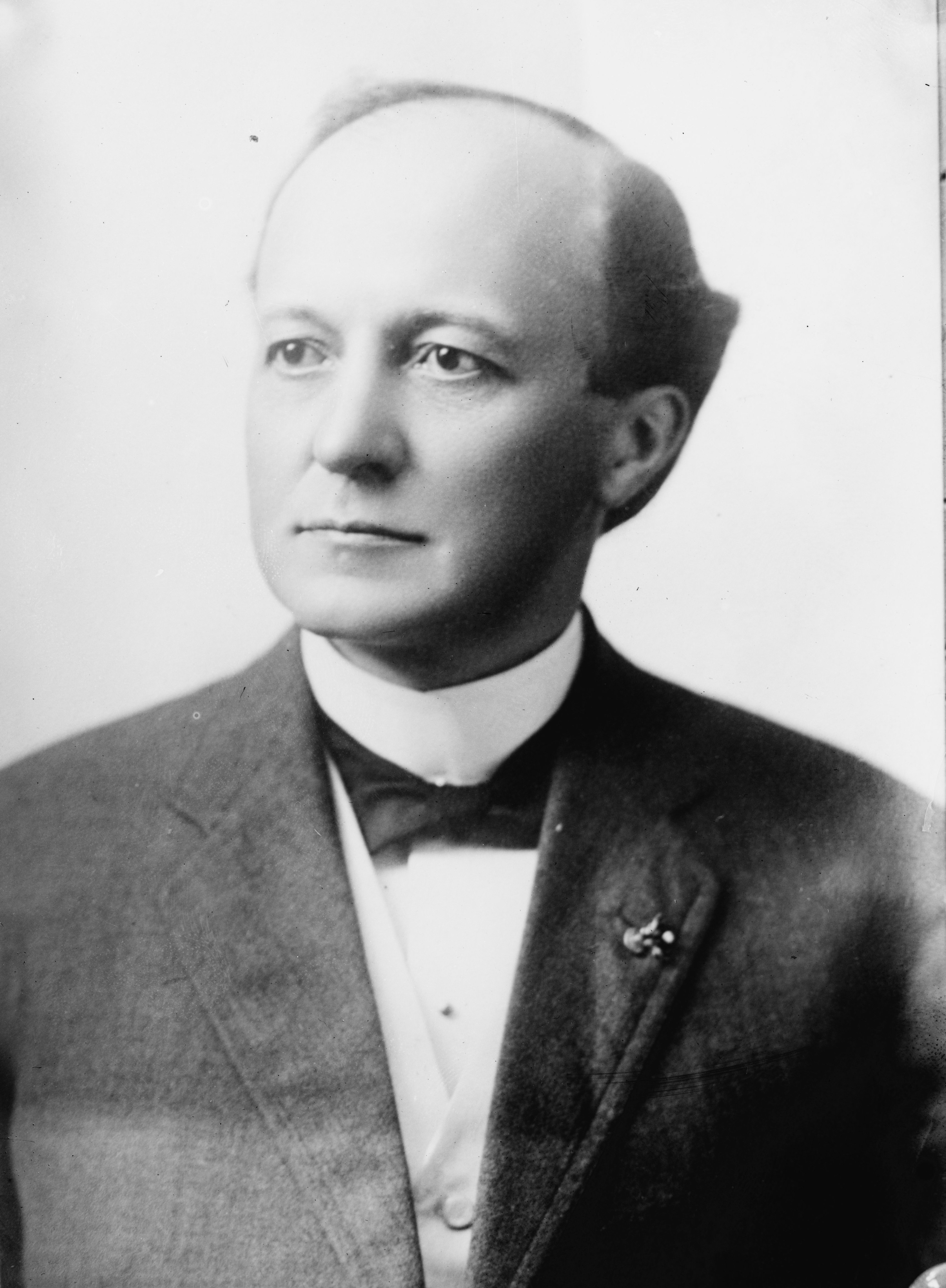
Nominee	Simeon Fess	Atlee Pomerene
Party	Republican	Democratic
Popular vote	794,159	744,558
Percentage	50.90%	47.72%
- County results Fess: 40–50% 50–60% 60–70% 70–80% Pomerene: 50–60% 60–70%
U.S. senator before election
Atlee Pomerene
Democratic
Elected U.S. Senator
Simeon Fess
Republican

The 1922 United States Senate election in Ohio took place on November 7, 1922. Incumbent Democratic Senator Atlee Pomerene ran for re-election to a third term in office, but was defeated by Republican U.S. Representative Simeon Fess.

== General election ==
=== Candidates ===
- Simeon Fess, U.S. Representative from Yellow Springs (Republican)
- Virginia D. Green (Independent)
- Atlee Pomerene, incumbent Senator since 1911 (Democratic)

=== Results ===
1922 U.S. Senate election in Ohio
Party	Candidate	Votes	%	±%
Republican	Simeon Fess	794,159	50.90%	▲4.75
Democratic	Atlee Pomerene (incumbent)	744,558	47.72%	▼1.54
Independent	Virginia D. Green	21,514	1.38%	N/A
Total votes		1,560,231	100.00%	
Republican gain from Democratic				

== See also ==
- 1922 United States Senate elections
