= 1962 United States Senate election in Ohio =

- November 6, 1962
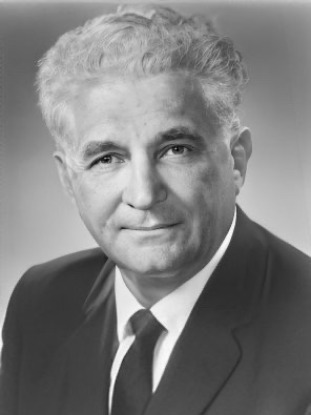

Nominee	Frank Lausche	John M. Briley
Party	Democratic	Republican
Popular vote	1,843,813	1,151,173
Percentage	61.56%	38.44%
- County results Lausche: 50–60% 60–70% 70–80% Briley: 50–60%
U.S. senator before election
Frank J. Lausche
Democratic
Elected U.S. Senator
Frank J. Lausche
Democratic

The 1962 United States Senate election in Ohio took place on November 6, 1962. Incumbent Senator Frank Lausche was re-elected to a second term in office, easily defeating Republican attorney John Marshall Briley.

== Democratic primary ==
=== Candidates ===
- Albert T. Ball, candidate for Lt. Governor in 1958
- Raymond Warren Beringer,
- Frank Lausche, incumbent Senator since 1957

Democratic primary results
Party	Candidate	Votes	%
Democratic	Frank Lausche (incumbent)	437,902	73.96%
Democratic	Albert T. Ball	90,609	15.30%
Democratic	Raymond Warren Beringer	63,543	10.73%
Total votes		592,054	100.00%

== Republican primary ==
=== Candidates ===
- John S. Ballard, Summit County Prosecutor
- John Marshall Briley, general counsel for Owens-Corning Fiberglas
- Charles E. Fry, State Senator from Springfield
- Ross Pepple, State Senator from Lima

Republican primary results
Party	Candidate	Votes	%
Republican	John Marshall Briley	177,987	34.80%
Republican	Charles E. Fry	143,320	28.02%
Republican	John S. Ballard	139,923	27.36%
Republican	Ross Pepple	50,221	7.50%
Total votes		511,452	100.00%

== General election ==
1962 United States Senate election in Ohio
Party	Candidate	Votes	%	±%
Democratic	Frank Lausche (incumbent)	1,843,813	61.56%	▲8.73
Republican	John Marshall Briley	1,151,173	38.44%	▼8.73
Total votes		3,743,120	100.0%	

== See also ==
- 1962 United States Senate elections
