= 1976 United States Senate election in Ohio =

- November 2, 1976
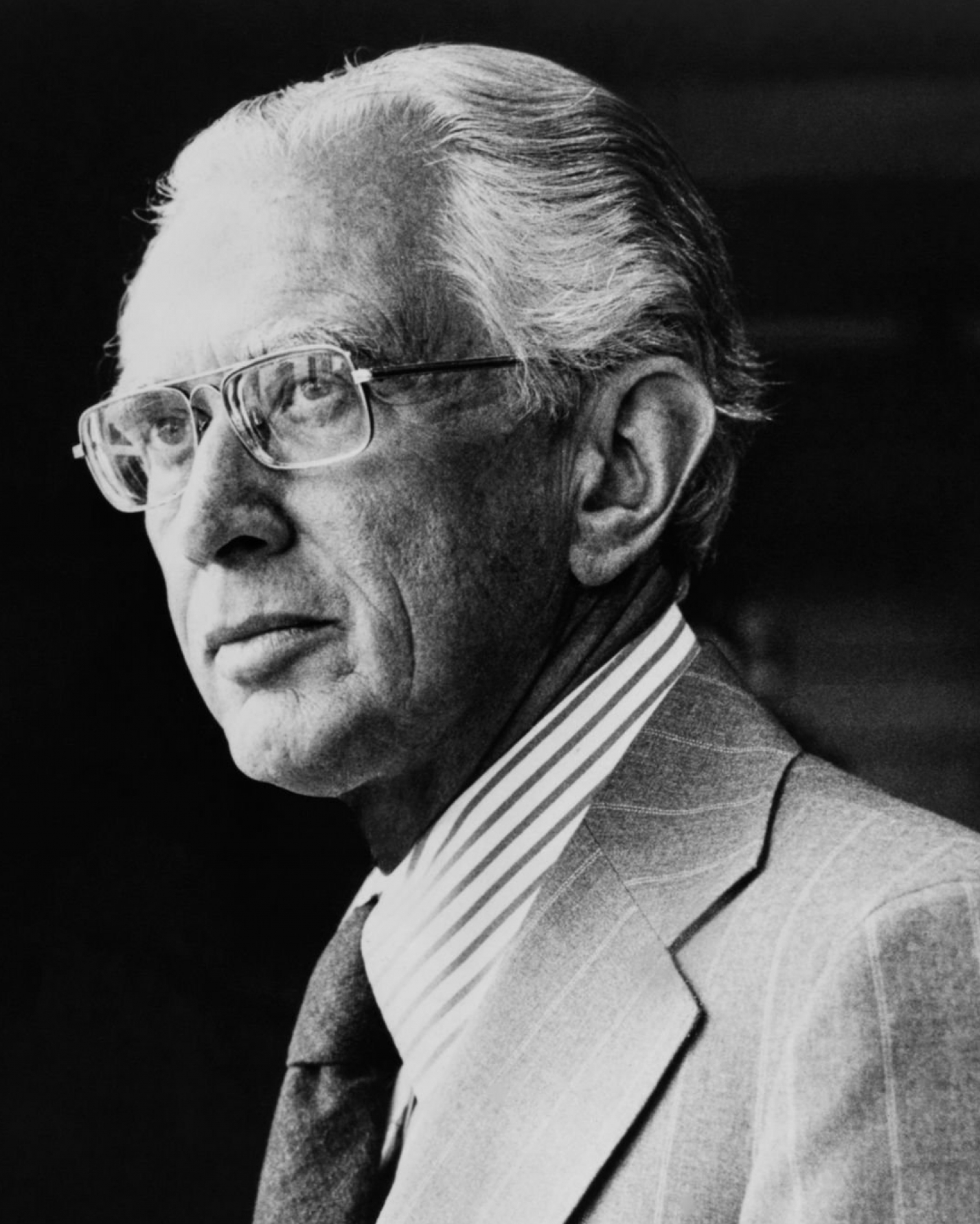

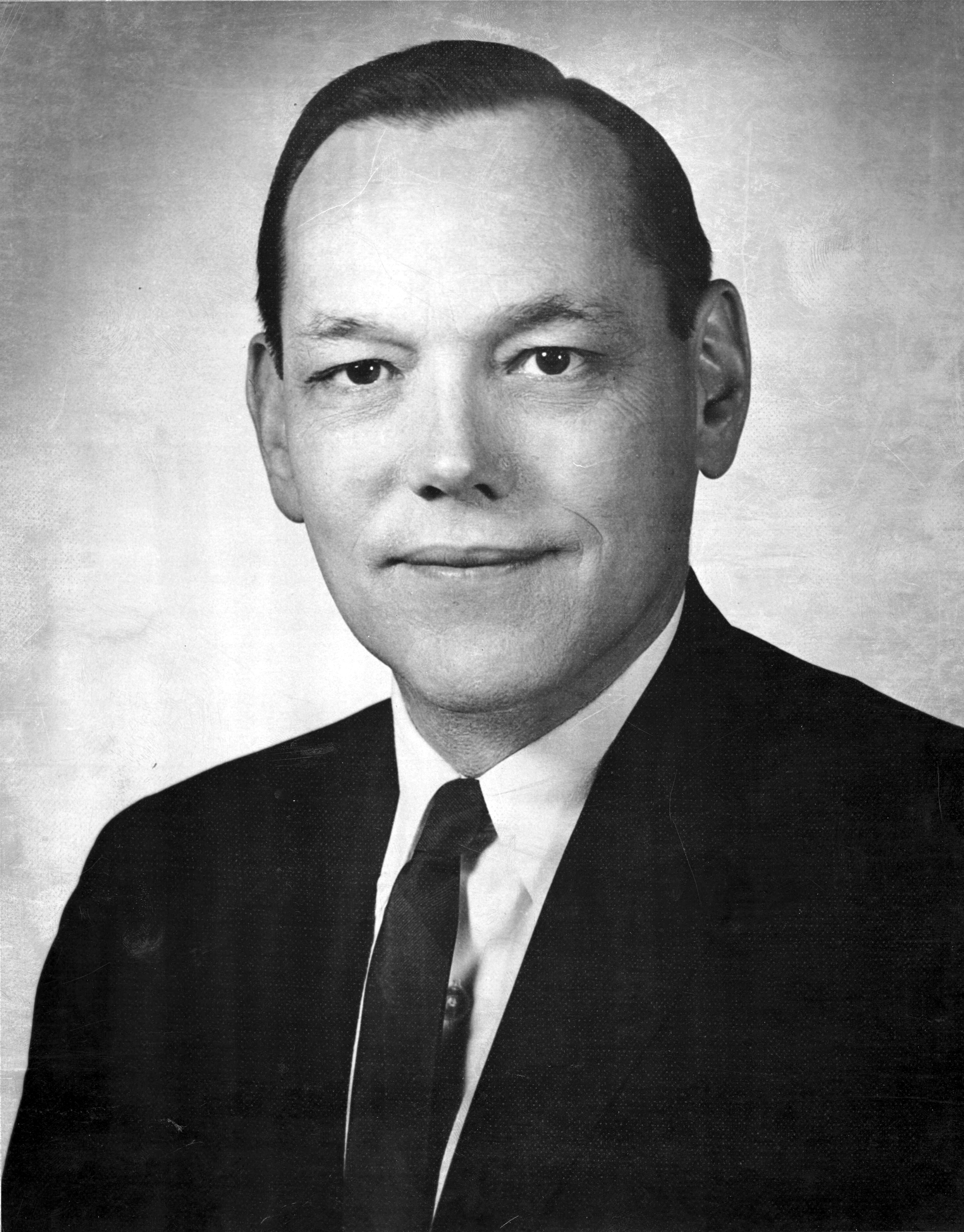
Nominee	Howard Metzenbaum	Robert Taft Jr.
Party	Democratic	Republican
Popular vote	1,941,113	1,823,774
Percentage	49.51%	46.52%
- County results Metzenbaum: 40–50% 50–60% 60–70% Taft: 40–50% 50–60% 60–70%
U.S. senator before election
Robert Taft Jr.
Republican
Elected U.S. Senator
Howard Metzenbaum
Democratic

The 1976 United States Senate election in Ohio took place on November 2, 1976. Incumbent Republican senator Robert Taft, Jr. ran for re-election to second term. Democrat Howard Metzenbaum, who had briefly served in the Senate in 1974, unseated Taft in a rematch of the 1970 election. Metzenbaum became the first Jewish senator of Ohio.

== Democratic primary ==
=== Candidates ===
- Richard B. Kay, Cleveland attorney and perennial candidate
- Howard Metzenbaum, former State Senator from Lyndhurst and interim United States Senator in 1974
- James D. Nolan, nominee for Ohio Secretary of State in 1966
- James V. Stanton, U.S. Representative from Cleveland

=== Results ===
1976 Democratic Senate primary
Party	Candidate	Votes	%
Democratic	Howard Metzenbaum	576,124	53.58%
Democratic	James V. Stanton	400,552	37.26%
Democratic	James D. Nolan	62,979	5.86%
Democratic	Richard B. Kay	35,522	3.30%
Total votes		1,075,177	100.00%

== General election ==
=== Results ===
General election results
Party	Candidate	Votes	%	±%
Democratic	Howard Metzenbaum	1,941,113	49.51%	▲2.06
Republican	Robert Taft, Jr. (incumbent)	1,823,774	46.52%	▼3.16
Independent	John O'Neill	53,657	1.37%	N/A
American Independent	Donald E. Babcock	36,979	0.94%	▼1.00
Independent	Emma Lila Fundaburk	33,285	0.85%	N/A
Socialist Workers	Melissa Singler	31,805	0.81%	▼0.11
Majority		117,339	2.99%	
Turnout		3,920,613		
Democratic gain from Republican				

== See also ==
- 1976 United States Senate elections
