= 1926 United States Senate election in Ohio =

- November 2, 1926
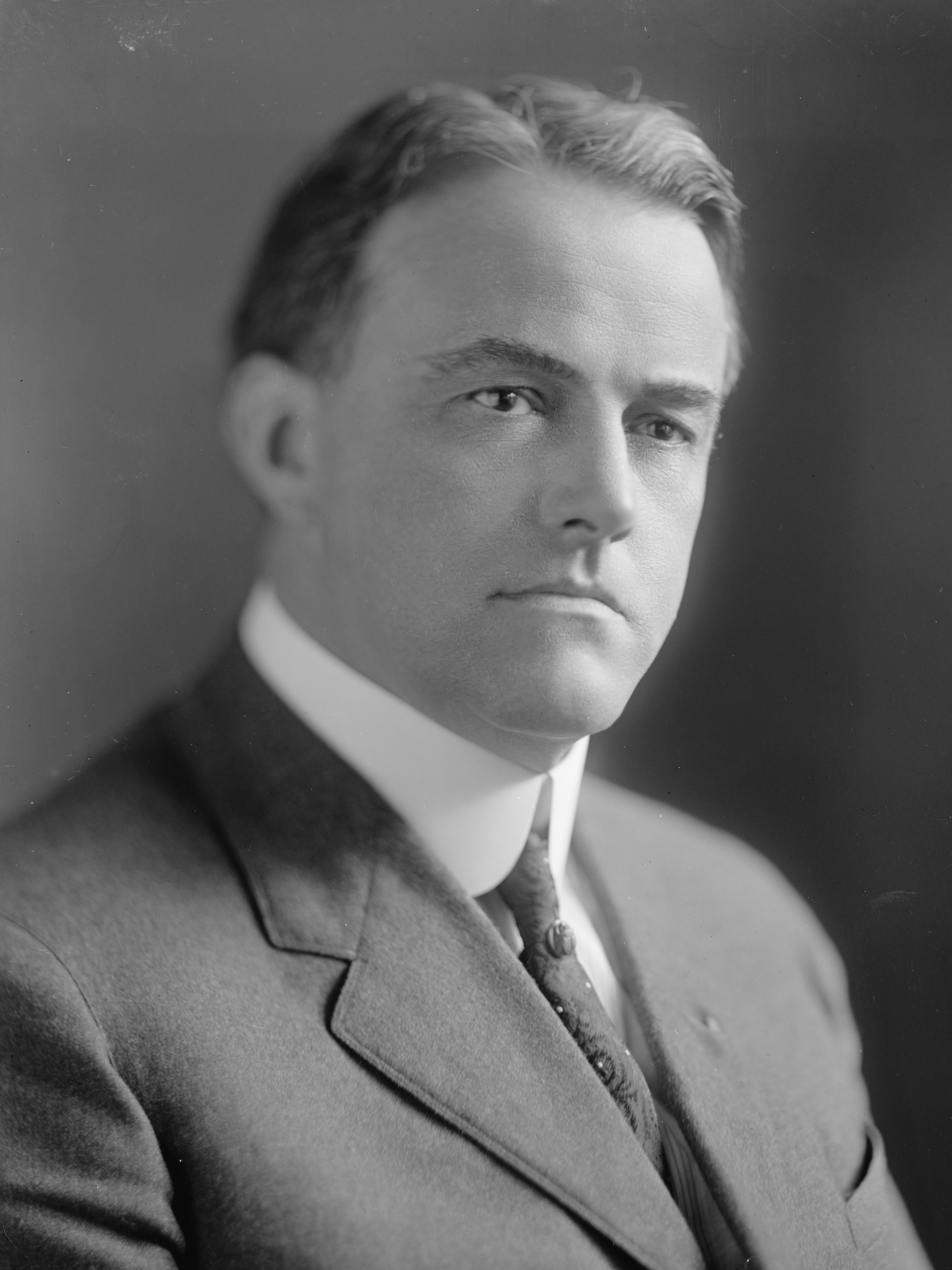

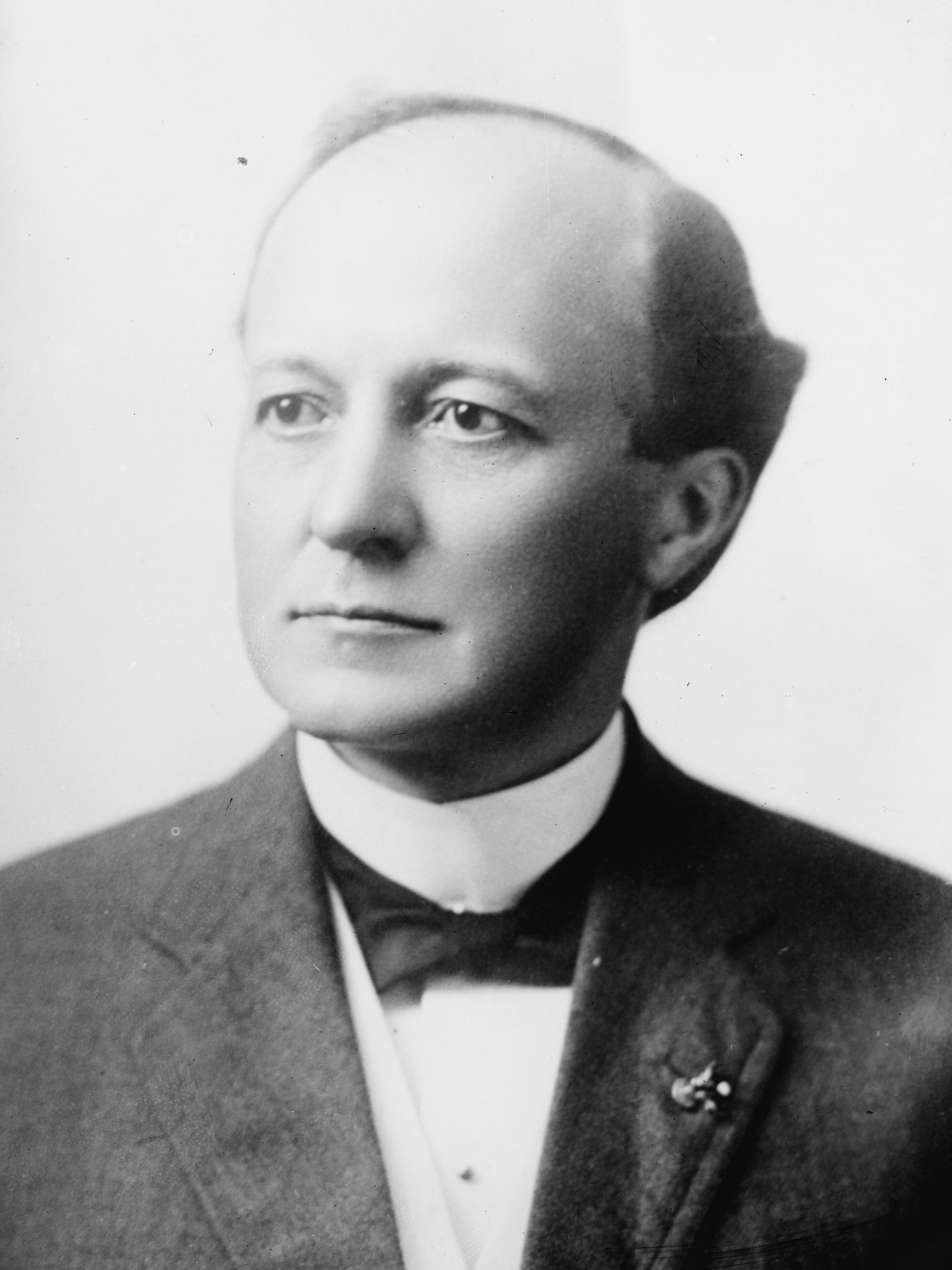
Nominee	Frank B. Willis	Atlee Pomerene
Party	Republican	Democratic
Popular vote	711,359	632,221
Percentage	53.19%	46.60%
- County results Willis: 40–50% 50–60% 60–70% 70–80% Pomerene: 50–60% 60–70%
U.S. senator before election
Frank B. Willis
Republican
Elected U.S. Senator
Frank B. Willis
Republican

The 1926 United States Senate special election in Ohio was held on November 2, 1926. Incumbent Republican Senator Frank B. Willis was re-elected to a second term in office, defeating former U.S. Senator Atlee Pomerene.

== General election ==
=== Candidates ===
- John D. Goerke (Socialist Labor)
- Atlee Pomerene, former U.S. Senator (1911–23) (Democratic)
- Frank B. Willis, incumbent Senator since 1921 (Republican)

=== Results ===
1926 U.S. Senate special election in Ohio
Party	Candidate	Votes	%	±%
Republican	Frank B. Willis (incumbent)	711,359	53.19%	▼5.91
Democratic	Atlee Pomerene	623,221	46.60%	▲5.84
Socialist Labor	John D. Goerke	2,846	0.21%	N/A
Total votes		1,337,426	100.00%	

== See also ==
- 1926 United States Senate elections
