= 1970 United States Senate election in Ohio =

- November 3, 1970
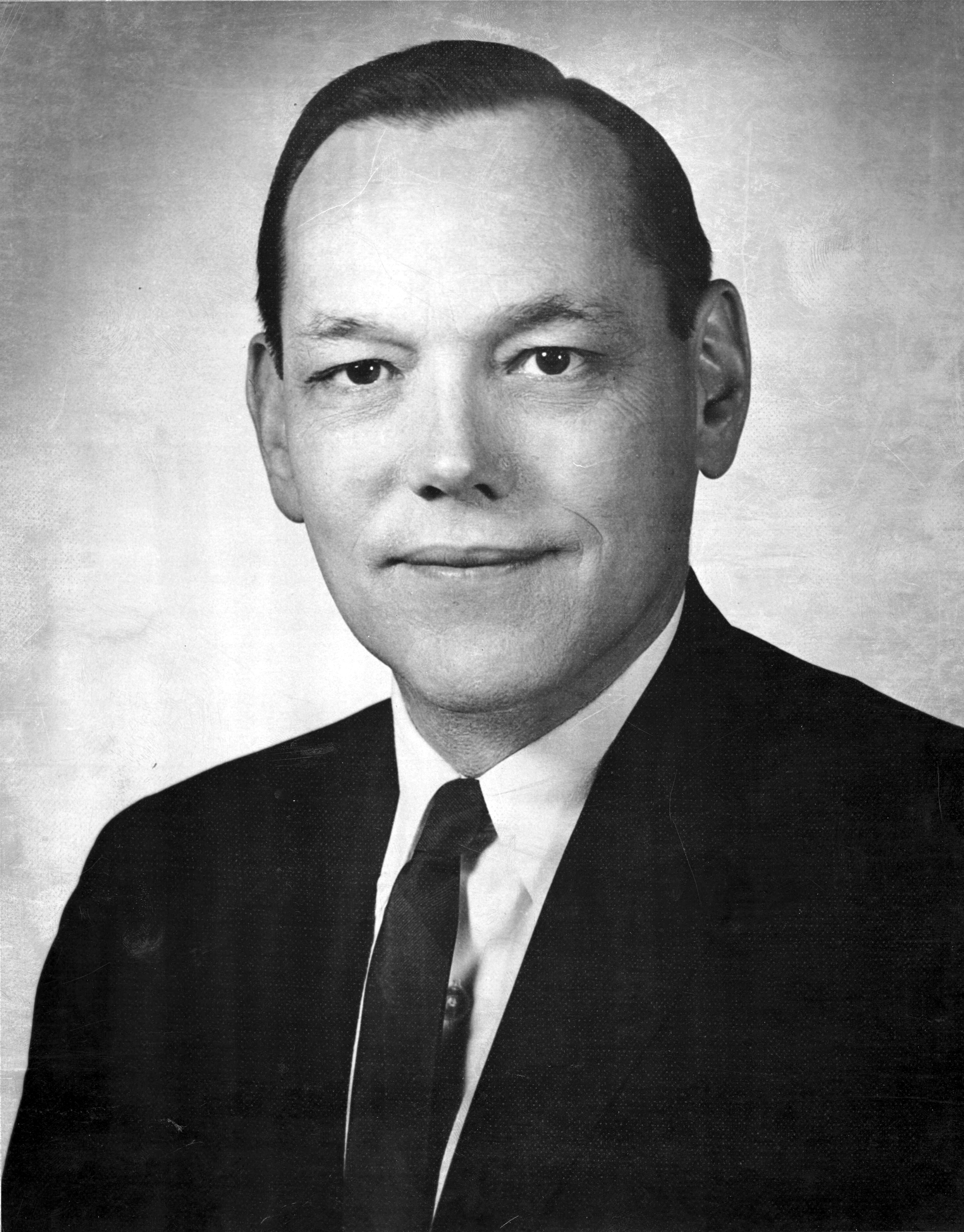

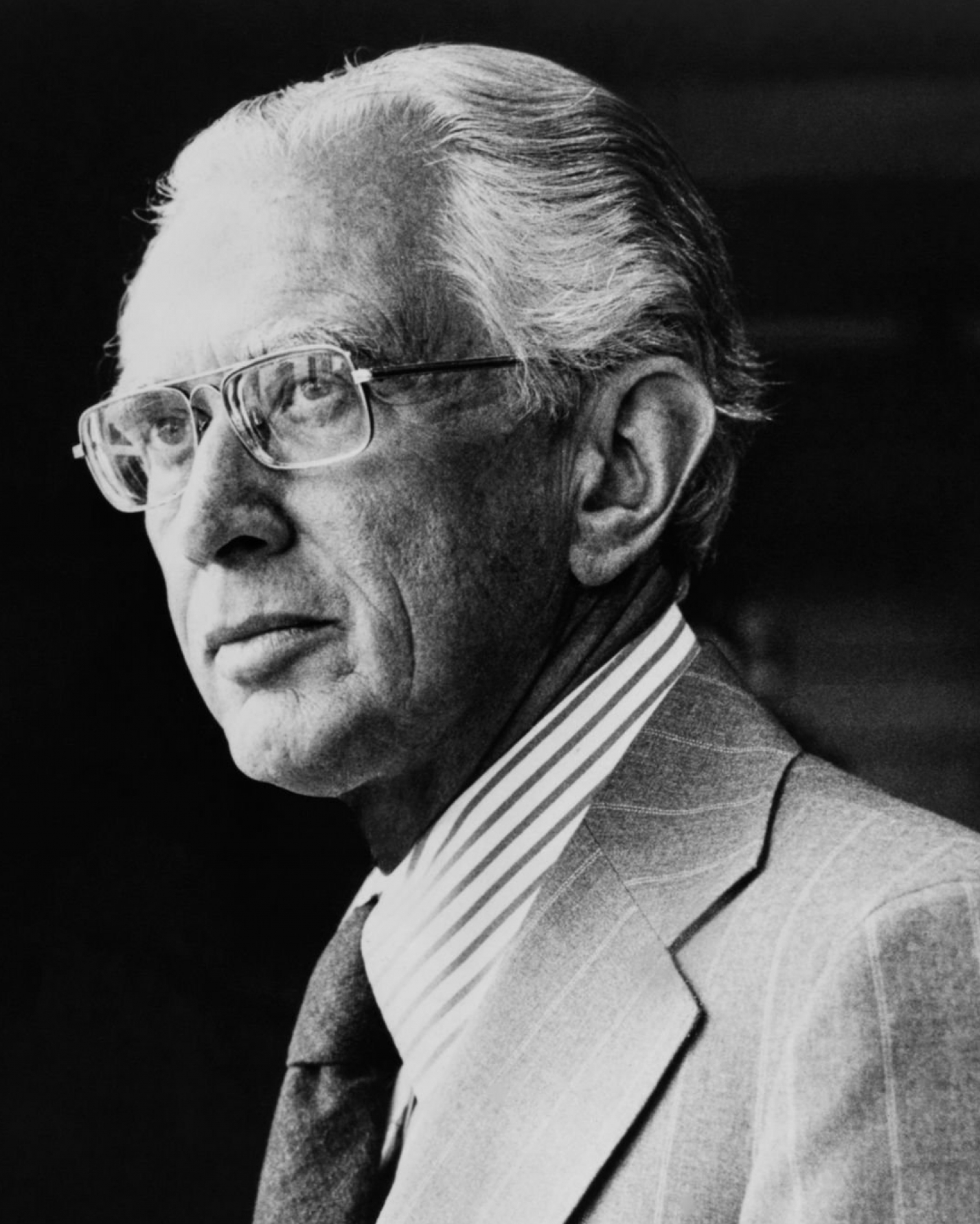
Nominee	Robert Taft Jr.	Howard Metzenbaum
Party	Republican	Democratic
Popular vote	1,565,682	1,495,262
Percentage	49.68%	47.52%
- County results Taft: 40–50% 50–60% 60–70% Metzenbaum: 40–50% 50–60%
U.S. senator before election
Stephen M. Young
Democratic
Elected U.S. Senator
Robert Taft Jr.
Republican

The 1970 United States Senate election in Ohio took place on November 3, 1970. Incumbent Democratic Senator Stephen M. Young did not run for re-election to a third term in office. U.S. Representative Robert Taft Jr. won the open seat over Democrat Howard Metzenbaum.

Primary elections were held on May 5, the day after four students were killed during the Kent State shootings. Both Taft and Metzenbaum won very competitive primaries to gain their parties' nominations, over Governor of Ohio Jim Rhodes and astronaut John Glenn, respectively.

== Democratic primary ==
=== Candidates ===
- Kenneth W. Clement, Cleveland physician and advisor to mayor Carl Stokes
- John Glenn, member of the Mercury Seven, first American to orbit the planet Earth, and candidate for Senate in 1964
- John W. McAlarney, Akron resident
- Howard Metzenbaum, industrialist, former State Senator from Lyndhurst and campaign manager for Senator Stephen Young in 1964

=== Results ===
Results by county Metzenbaum: 40–50% 50–60% Glenn: 40–50% 50–60% 60–70% 70–80%

1970 Democratic Senate primary
Party	Candidate	Votes	%
Democratic	Howard Metzenbaum	430,469	46.32%
Democratic	John Glenn	417,027	44.88%
Democratic	Kenneth W. Clement	50,375	5.42%
Democratic	John W. McAlarney	31,438	3.38%
Total votes		929,309	100.00%

== Republican primary ==
=== Candidates ===
- Jim Rhodes, Governor of Ohio since 1963
- Robert Taft Jr., U.S. Representative from Cincinnati, scion of the Taft family, and nominee for Senate in 1964

=== Results ===
1970 Republican Senate primary
Party	Candidate	Votes	%
Republican	Robert Taft Jr.	472,202	50.28%
Republican	Jim Rhodes	466,932	49.72%
Republican	William L. White (write-in)	18	0.00%
Total votes		939,152	100.00%

== General election ==
=== Results ===
1970 U.S. Senate election in Ohio
Party	Candidate	Votes	%	±%
Republican	Robert Taft Jr.	1,565,682	49.68%	▼0.10
Democratic	Howard Metzenbaum	1,495,262	46.52%	▼3.70
American Independent	Richard B. Kay	61,261	1.94%	N/A
Socialist Labor	John O'Neill	29,069	0.92%	N/A
Total votes		3,151,274	100.00%	
Republican gain from Democratic				

== See also ==
- 1970 United States Senate elections
