= Robert Taft Jr. =

American politician (1917–1993)

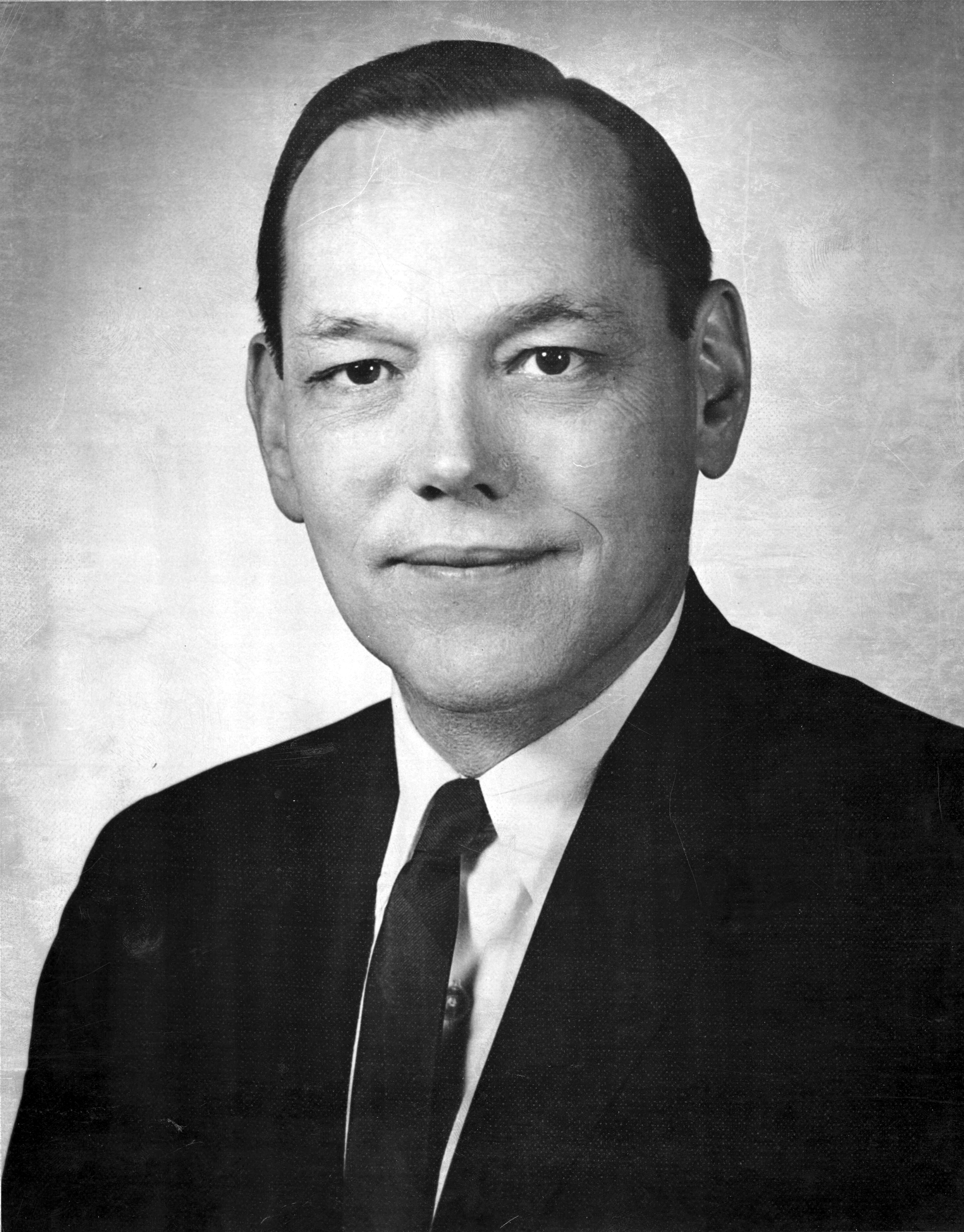
- Official portrait, 1964

United States Senator from Ohio
- In office January 3, 1971 – December 28, 1976
- Preceded by: Stephen M. Young
- Succeeded by: Howard Metzenbaum

Member of the U.S. House of Representatives from Ohio
- In office January 3, 1967 – January 3, 1971
- Preceded by: John J. Gilligan
- Succeeded by: William J. Keating
- Constituency: 1st district
- In office January 3, 1963 – January 3, 1965
- Preceded by: Constituency established
- Succeeded by: Robert E. Sweeney
- Constituency: at-large district
House positions
Chair of the House Republican Research Committee
In office January 3, 1969 – January 3, 1971
Leader	Gerald Ford
Preceded by	Charles Goodell
Succeeded by	Barber Conable

Personal details
- Born: Robert Alphonso Taft Jr. February 26, 1917 Cincinnati, Ohio, U.S.
- Died: December 7, 1993 (aged 76) Cincinnati, Ohio, U.S.
- Party: Republican
- Spouses: Blanca Duncan Noel (m. 1939; died 1968); Katherine Longworth Whittaker (m. 1969; div. 1977); Joan McKelvy (m. 1978)
- Children: 4, including Bob
- Parent: Robert A. Taft (father)
- Relatives: Taft family
- Education: Yale University (BA); Harvard University (LLB)

Robert Alphonso Taft Jr. (February 26, 1917 – December 7, 1993) was an American politician who served as a United States Senator from Ohio from 1971 to 1976. A member of the Republican Party, he also served in the United States House of Representatives from 1963 and 1965, and again from 1967 to 1971. He was a member of the prominent Taft political family; his father was Senate majority leader Robert A. Taft and his grandfather was President William Howard Taft, while his son Bob would serve as Ohio governor.

== Early life and education ==
Robert Alphonso Taft Jr. was born in Cincinnati, Ohio, on February 26, 1917, the second of four sons born to Robert A. Taft Sr. and Martha Wheaton Bowers. Robert Jr.'s paternal grandparents were President William Howard Taft and First Lady Helen Herron Taft, while his maternal grandparents were Solicitor General Lloyd Wheaton Bowers and Louisa Bennett Wilson. His older brother was William Howard Taft III, who served as U.S. Ambassador to Ireland from 1953 to 1957, while his younger brothers were Lloyd Bowers Taft, who worked as an investment banker in Cincinnati, and Horace Dwight Taft, who became a professor of physics and dean at Yale. Taft graduated from Yale University in 1939 and Harvard Law School in 1942.

== Career ==
During World War II, Taft served as an officer in the United States Navy from 1942 to 1946. After law school, Taft joined the Cincinnati law firm Taft Stettinius & Hollister, which had been founded by his father. In 1955, he became a compatriot of the Sons of the American Revolution.

Taft served in the Ohio House of Representatives from 1955 to 1962 until winning election to the United States House of Representatives. He was elected in 1962 as an at-large representative from Ohio (at-large seats were later barred by the Voting Rights Act of 1965).

Taft subsequently ran in the 1964 United States Senate election in Ohio rather than running for re-election to the House, but he lost to incumbent Stephen M. Young. In 1966, Taft returned to the House of Representatives, unseating Democratic incumbent (and future Ohio governor) John J. Gilligan. Taft won re-election in 1968, defeating Democrat Carl F. Heiser.

Taft ran for Senate again in the 1970 United States Senate election in Ohio, as Young was retiring; he narrowly defeated Ohio governor Jim Rhodes in the Republican primary and then defeated Democratic nominee Howard Metzenbaum in the general election. Taft, however, lost six years later in a rematch against Metzenbaum. He resigned six days before the end of his term to resume the practice of law.

== Personal life and death ==
In 1939, Robert Jr. married Blanca Duncan Noel (1917–1968), daughter of Lewis W. Noel and Natalie Duncan. They were the parents of Bob Taft, who would serve as governor of Ohio from 1999 to 2007; Sarah Butler Taft; Deborah Taft; and Jonathan Duncan Taft. After Blanca's death, Robert Jr. remarried to Katherine Longworth Whittaker, widow of his distant cousin David Gibson Taft. They divorced in 1977 and in October 1978, he married Joan McKelvy, also of Cincinnati.

On November 29, 1993, Taft suffered a stroke and fell into a coma. He never woke from the coma and died on December 7, 1993. Joan died on January 16, 2015.

U.S. House of Representatives
New constituency	Member of the U.S. House of Representatives from Ohio's at-large congressional district 1963–1965	Succeeded by Robert E. Sweeney
Preceded by John J. Gilligan	Member of the U.S. House of Representatives from Ohio's 1st congressional district 1967–1971	Succeeded by William J. Keating
Party political offices
Preceded by John W. Bricker	Republican nominee for U.S. Senator from Ohio (Class 1); 1964, 1970, 1976	Succeeded by Paul Pfeifer
Preceded by Charles Goodell	Chair of the House Republican Research Committee; 1969–1971	Succeeded by Barber Conable
U.S. Senate
Preceded by Stephen M. Young	U.S. Senator (Class 1) from Ohio; 1971–1976; Served alongside: William B. Saxbe, Howard Metzenbaum, John Glenn	Succeeded by Howard Metzenbaum
