= List of Ohio politicians by federal office =

Many politicians and lawyers from the state of Ohio have served in senior positions in the executive, legislative and judicial branches of the United States federal government. These have included seven presidents, three presidents of the Senate, two speakers of the House of Representatives, and three chief justices of the United States.

== Executive branch ==
=== Presidents of the United States and candidates ===
| Name | Life dates | Party | Candidate | Nominee | Served |
|---|---|---|---|---|---|
| James M. Cox | 1870-1957 | Democratic | | 1920 | |
| James A. Garfield | 1831-1881 | Republican | | 1880 | 1881 |
| John H. Glenn Jr. | 1921-2016 | Democratic | 1984 | | |
| Ulysses S. Grant | 1822-1885 | Republican | | 1868, 1872 | 1869-1877 |
| Warren G. Harding | 1865-1923 | Republican | | 1920 | 1921-1923 |
| Benjamin Harrison | 1833-1901 | Republican | | 1888, 1892 | 1889-1893 |
| Rutherford B. Hayes | 1822-1893 | Republican | | 1876 | 1877-1881 |
| William McKinley | 1843-1901 | Republican | | 1896, 1900 | 1843-1901 |
| William H. Taft I | 1857-1930 | Republican | | 1908, 1912 | 1909-1913 |
| Aaron S. Watkins | 1863-1941 | (Prohibition) | | 1920 | |

=== Vice presidents of the United States and candidates ===
| Name | Life dates | Party | Candidate | Served |
|---|---|---|---|---|
| John W. Bricker | 1893–1986 | Republican | 1944 | |
| Samuel F. Cary | 1814–1900 | Greenback | 1876 | |
| Thomas A. Hendricks | 1819–1885 | Democratic | 1884 | 1885 |
| Thomas Morris | 1776–1844 | Liberty | 1844 | |
| George H. Pendleton | 1825–1889 | Democratic | 1864 | |
| Allen G. Thurman | 1813–1895 | Democratic | 1888 | |
| Aaron S. Watkins | 1863–1941 | Prohibition | 1908, 1912 | |

=== Cabinet secretaries ===
| Name | Life dates | Party | Offices (with dates of service) |
|---|---|---|---|
| Newton D. Baker | 1871-1937 | Democratic | 1916-1921: Secretary of War |
| Anthony J. Celebrezze Sr. | 1910-1998 | Democratic | 1962-1965: Secretary of Health, Education, and Welfare |
| Salmon P. Chase | 1808-1873 | Republican | 1861-1864: Secretary of the Treasury |
| Thomas Corwin | 1794-1865 | Whig | 1850-1853: Secretary of the Treasury |
| William B. Saxbe | 1916-2010 | Republican | 1974-1975: Attorney General |
| John Sherman | 1823-1900 | Republican | 1877-1881: Secretary of the Treasury; 1897-1898: Secretary of State |
| Alphonso Taft | 1810-1891 | Republican | 1876: Secretary of War; 1876-1877: Attorney General |
| William H. Taft I | 1857-1930 | Republican | 1904-1908: Secretary of War |

=== United States ambassadors ===
- List of ambassadors of the United States from Ohio

=== Other federal officers ===
| Name | Life dates | Party | Positions and dates |
|---|---|---|---|
| William H. Taft I | 1857-1930 | Republican | 1901-1904: Civilian Governor of the Philippines |
| Mary Ellen Withrow | 1930- | Democratic | 1994-2001: U.S. Treasurer |

== Legislative branch ==
=== Senate ===
==== Presidents pro tempore of the United States Senate ====
| Name | Life dates | Party | Term(s) of service |
|---|---|---|---|
| John Sherman | 1823-1900 | Republican | 1885-1887 |
| Allen G. Thurman | 1813-1895 | Democratic | 1879-1880 |
| Benjamin F. Wade | 1800-1878 | Republican | 1867-1869 |

==== Majority leaders of the United States Senate ====
None

==== Minority leaders of the United States Senate ====
| Name | Life dates | Party | Term(s) of service |
|---|---|---|---|
| Robert A. Taft I | 1889-1953 | Republican | 1953 |

==== Democratic leadership officeholders (whips, conference chairmen, etc.) of the United States Senate ====
| Name | Life dates | Term(s) of service |
|---|---|---|
| George H. Pendleton | 1825-1889 | Democratic Conference Chairman: 1881-1885 |

==== Republican leadership officeholders (whips, conference chairmen, etc.) of the United States Senate ====
| Name | Life dates | Term(s) of service |
|---|---|---|
| Harold H. Burton | 1888-1964 | Republican Conference Secretary: 1944-1945 |
| Simeon D. Fess | 1861-1936 | Republican Whip: 1929-1933 |
| John Sherman | 1823-1900 | Republican Conference Chairman: 1884-1885, 1891-1897 |
| Robert A. Taft I | 1889-1953 | Republican Policy Committee Chairman: 1947-1952 |

==== United States senators and candidates ====
| Name | Life dates | Party | Candidate | Term(s) of service |
|---|---|---|---|---|
| Israel Amter | | | 1928s | |
| Donald E. Babcock | | American | 1976 | |
| George H. Bender | 1869-1961 | Republican | 1954s, 1956 | 1954-1957 |
| Gilbert Bettman | 1881-1942 | Republican | 1932 | |
| James E. Betts | 1932/1933- | Republican | 1980 | |
| Mary O. Boyle | 1941- | Democratic | 1998 | |
| John W. Bricker | 1893-1986 | Republican | 1946, 1952, 1958 | 1947-1959 |
| John Marshall Briley | | Republican | 1962 | |
| Robert J. Bulkley | 1880-1965 | Democratic | 1930s, 1932, 1938 | 1930-1933 |
| Thomas A. Burke | 1898-1971 | Democratic | 1954s | 1953-1954 |
| Harold Hitz Burton | 1888-1964 | Republican | 1940 | 1941-1946 |
| Theodore E. Burton | 1851-1929 | Republican | 1928s | 1928-1929 |
| Theodore S. Celeste | 1954- | Democratic | 2000 | |
| R. Michael DeWine | 1947- | Republican | 1992, 1994, 2000 | 1995-2006 |
| Michael DiSalle | 1908-1981 | Democratic | 1952 | |
| A. Victor Donahey | 1873-1946 | Democratic | 1934 | 1935-1941 |
| John Eastman | | Natural Law | 2000 | |
| William Farkas | | Socialist Labor | 1946, 1958 | |
| Joseph T. Ferguson | | Democratic | 1950 | |
| Simeon D. Fess | 1861-1936 | Republican | 1922, 1928, 1934 | 1923-1935 |
| Eric D. Fingerhut | 1959- | Democratic | 2004 | |
| I. O. Ford | | Communist | 1932 | |
| Emma Lila Fundaburk | | | 1976 | |
| John J. Gilligan | 1921-2013 | Democratic | 1968 | |
| John H. Glenn Jr. | 1921-2016 | Democratic | 1974, 1986, 1992 | 1975-1999 |
| ? Goerke | | Socialist Labor | 1926 | |
| James Goward | | | 1928 | |
| Virginia D. Green | | | 1922 | |
| Martha Kathryn Grevatt | | | 1992 | |
| Kathleen G. Harroff | | | 1974 | |
| Philip Herzing | | Libertarian | 1982 | |
| James W. Huffman | 1894-1980 | Democratic | 1946 | |
| Graham P. Hunt | | Democratic | 1928s | |
| J. Wetherell Hutton | | | 1928 | |
| Joel Z. Hyatt | 1950- | Democratic | 1994 | |
| Richard B. Kay | | American Independent | 1970, 1974 | |
| Thomas N. Kindness | 1929-2014 | Republican | 1986 | |
| Frank J. Lausche | 1895-1990 | Democratic | 1956, 1962 | 1957-1963 |
| Cyrus Locher | 1878-1929 | Democratic | | 1928 |
| John McAlister | | Libertarian | 2000 | |
| Roscoe C. McCulloch | 1880-1958 | Republican | 1930s | |
| John McSweeney | 1890-1969 | Democratic | 1940 | |
| Frank M. Mecartney | 1890-1969 | (Prohibition) | 1932 | |
| Alicia Merel | | | 1982 | |
| Howard M. Metzenbaum | 1917-2008 | Democratic | 1970, 1976, 1982, 1988 | 1974-1975, 1977-1995 |
| Rick Nagin | | | 1980 | |
| John O'Neill | | Socialist Labor | 1970, 1976 | |
| Ralph J. Perk | 1914-1999 | Republican | 1974 | |
| Paul E. Pfeifer | 1942- | Republican | 1982 | |
| William G. Pickrel | 1888-1966 | Democratic | 1944 | |
| Atlee Pomerene | 1863-1937 | Democratic | 1922 | |
| John E. Powers | | | 1980 | |
| W. C. Sandberg | | Communist | 1934 | |
| William B. Saxbe | 1916-2010 | Republican | 1968 | 1969-1974 |
| Melissa Singler | | | 1976 | |
| Joseph J. Slovenec | | | 1994 | |
| Anna K. Storck | | | 1926 | |
| Henry B. Strong | | | 1926 | |
| Kingsley A. Taft | 1903-1970 | Republican | 1946s | 1946-1947 |
| Robert A. Taft | 1889-1953 | Republican | 1938, 1944, 1950 | 1939-1953 |
| Robert Taft Jr. | 1917-1993 | Republican | 1964, 1970, 1976 | 1971-1976 |
| Charles V. Truax | 1887-1935 | Democratic | 1928 | |
| Henry P. Webber | | Democratic | 1946 | |
| Frank B. Willis | 1871-1928 | Republican | 1920, 1926 | 1920-1928 |
| Joseph Willnecker | | | 1928 | |
| George V. Voinovich | 1936-2016 | Republican | 1988, 1998, 2004 | 1999-present |
| Stephen M. Young | 1889-1984 | Democratic | 1958, 1964 | 1959-1971 |

=== House of Representatives ===
==== Speakers of the United States House of Representatives ====
| Name | Life dates | Party | Term(s) of service |
|---|---|---|---|
| J. Warren Keifer | 1836-1932 | Republican | 1881-1883 |
| Nicholas Longworth | 1869-1931 | Republican | 1925-1931 |

==== Majority leaders of the United States House of Representatives ====
| Name | Life dates | Party | Term(s) of service |
|---|---|---|---|
| Nicholas Longworth | 1869-1931 | Republican | 1923-1925 |

==== Minority leaders of the United States House of Representatives ====
None

==== Democratic leadership officeholders (whips, caucus chairmen, etc.) in the United States House of Representatives ====
| Name | Life dates | Position (with dates of service) |
|---|---|---|
| George W. Geddes | 1824-1892 | 1883-1885: Democratic Caucus Chairman |
| Edson B. Olds | 1802-1869 | 1853-1855: Democratic Caucus Chairman |

==== Republican leadership officeholders (whips, conference chairmen, etc.) in the United States House of Representatives ====
| Name | Life dates | Position (with dates of service) |
|---|---|---|
| John A. Boehner | 1949- | 1995-1999: Republican Conference Chairman |
| Samuel L. Devine | 1915-1997 | 1979-1981: Republican Conference Chairman |
| Charles H. Grosvenor | 1833-1917 | 1895-1899: Republican Conference Chairman |
| Deborah D. Pryce | 1951- | 2003–present: Republican Conference Chairman |
| Robert C. Schenck | 1809-1890 | 1869-1871: Republican Conference Chairman |

==== United States representatives and candidates ====
- List of candidates for U.S. Representative from Ohio
- List of candidates for U.S. Representative from Ohio, A-G
- List of candidates for U.S. Representative from Ohio, H-M
- List of candidates for U.S. Representative from Ohio, N-Z

== Judicial branch ==
=== Chief justices of the United States ===
| Name | Life dates | Appointed by | Party | Term(s) of service |
|---|---|---|---|---|
| Salmon P. Chase | 1808-1873 | Lincoln | Republican | 1864-1873 |
| William H. Taft I | 1857-1930 | Harding | Republican | 1921-1930 |
| Morrison R. Waite | 1816-1888 | Grant | Republican | 1874-1888 |

=== Associate justices of the United States Supreme Court ===
| Name | Life dates | Appointed by | Party | Term(s) of service |
|---|---|---|---|---|
| Harold H. Burton | 1888-1964 | Truman | Republican | 1945-1958 |
| John Hessin Clarke | 1857-1945 | Wilson | Democratic | 1916-1922 |
| William R. Day | 1849-1923 | T. Roosevelt | Republican | 1903-1922 |
| Stanley Matthews | 1824-1889 | Garfield | Republican | 1881-1889 |
| John McLean | 1785-1861 | Jackson | Democratic | 1830-1861 |
| Potter Stewart | 1915-1985 | Eisenhower | Republican | 1958-1981 |
| Noah Haynes Swayne | 1804-1884 | Lincoln | Republican | 1862-1881 |
| William Burnham Woods | 1824-1887 | Grant | Democratic | 1880-1887 |

=== Judges of United States Courts of Appeal ===
| Name | Life dates | Party | Circuit | Term(s) of service |
|---|---|---|---|---|
| Anthony J. Celebrezze Sr. | 1910-1998 | Democratic | 6th | 1965-1980 |
