= Gilbert Bettman =

American judge and politician (1881–1942)

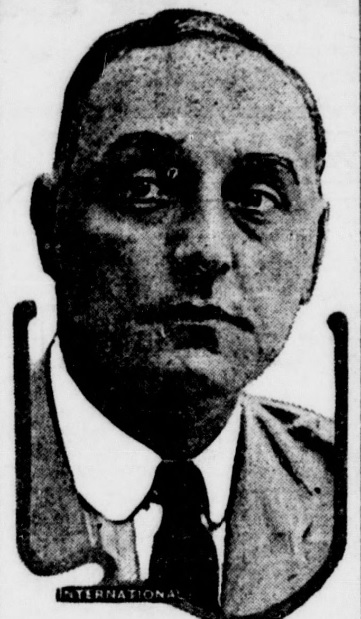
- Bettman in 1921

31st Ohio Attorney General
- In office 1929–1933
- Governor: Myers Y. Cooper; George White
- Preceded by: Edward C. Turner
- Succeeded by: John W. Bricker

Associate Justice of the Supreme Court of Ohio
- In office 1941–1942
- Preceded by: Arthur H. Day
- Succeeded by: Charles S. Bell

Personal details
- Born: October 3, 1881 Cincinnati, Ohio, U.S.
- Died: July 17, 1942 (aged 60) Ohio, U.S.
- Resting place: Spring Grove Cemetery
- Party: Republican
- Spouse: Iphigene Molony
- Education: Harvard University

Gilbert Bettman (October 3, 1881 – July 17, 1942) was an American politician of the Ohio Republican party.

From 1919 to 1929, he was on the faculty, and then the dean of the YMCA Law School of Cincinnati, now the Salmon P. Chase College of Law at Northern Kentucky University.

In 1932, Bettman ran for the office of U.S. senator from Ohio. He lost to the incumbent Democrat, Robert J. Bulkley.

From January 1941 to July 1942, Bettman served as a justice of the Ohio Supreme Court.

== See also ==
- List of Jewish American jurists
- List of justices of the Ohio Supreme Court
- List of Ohio politicians

Party political offices
Preceded by Roscoe C. McCulloch	Republican nominee for U.S. Senator from Ohio (Class 3); 1932	Succeeded by Robert A. Taft
Legal offices
Preceded by Edward C. Turner	Attorney General of Ohio; 1929–1933	Succeeded by John W. Bricker
