= William C. Mooney House =

Historic house in Ohio, United States

- U.S. National Register of Historic Places
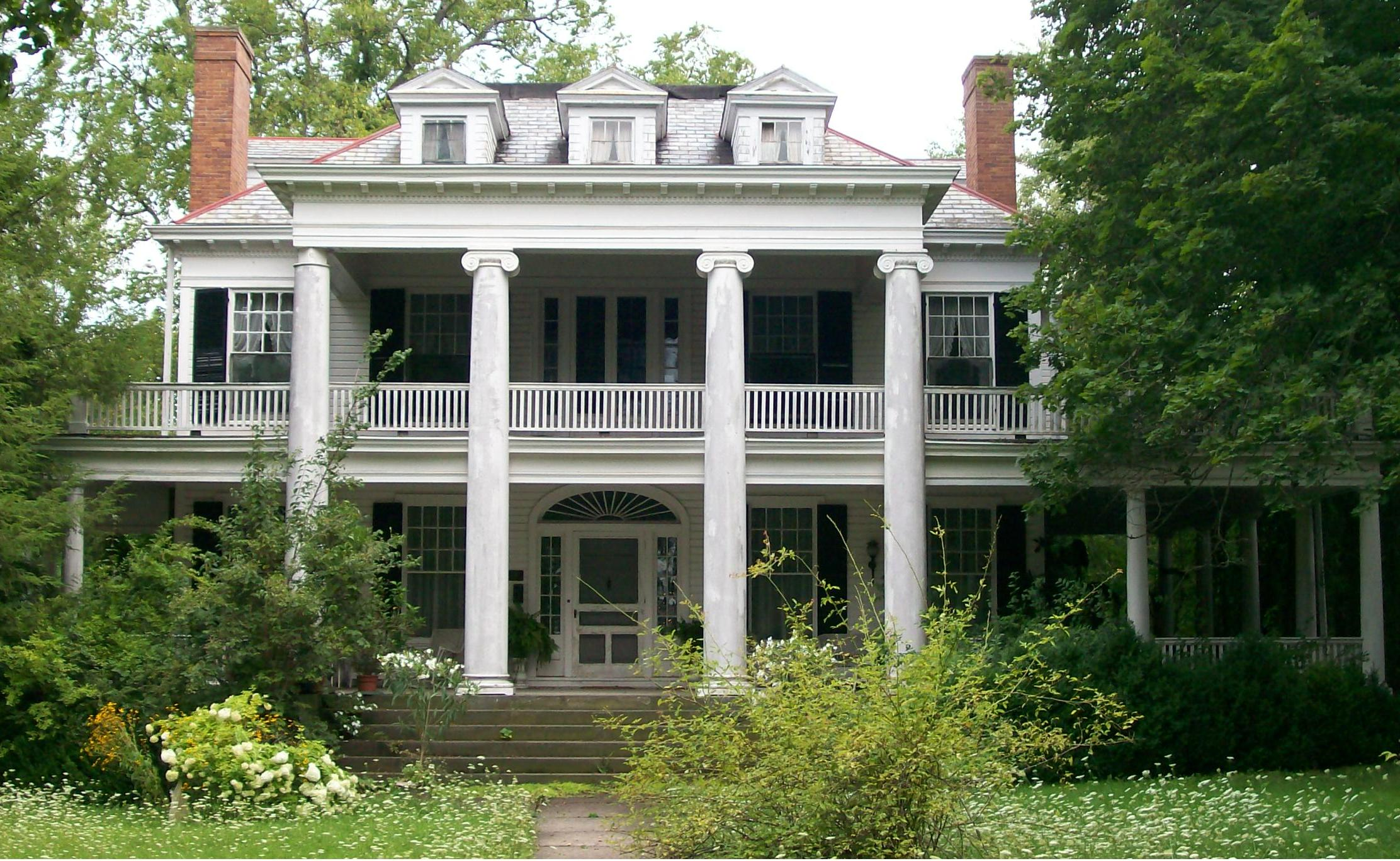
- The Mooney House in Woodsfield, Ohio

- Location within Ohio Location within the United States
- Location: 122 N. Paul St., Woodsfield, Ohio
- Coordinates: 39°45′50″N 81°6′46″W
- Area: 4.9 acres (2.0 ha)
- Built: 1880
- Architectural style: Colonial Revival
- NRHP reference No.: 82003615
- Added to NRHP: March 15, 1982

The William C. Mooney House, also known as the Mooney Mansion, is located at 122 North Paul Street in Woodsfield, Ohio. The house was placed on the National Register on 1982/03/15.

== History ==
The original house located on the property was a Queen Anne style residence, built with elements such as a corner tower. Such was the house when it became the home of William C. Mooney, a scion of Woodsfield's most prominent commercial family and vice-president of the Monroe Bank downtown. Beginning in 1912, Mooney arranged for a comprehensive remodelling project: gone were the ornaments, the tower, and the other Queen Anne components. In their place were built the current house's prominent facade with an Ionic-style portico, symmetrical five-bay front, and two-story-tall veranda. Mooney had a ballroom built on the third floor; here he threw Christmas parties and other events for many of the village's residents.

== Appearance ==
The 2 1/2-story wooden-frame house rises from its lot with the main entrance facing north. The entrance is reached by a small flight of stairs and is flanked by four colossal Ionic columns and a 2-story veranda. The front door is surrounded by transom windows on either side and a large fan light with wooden spokes. The door sits in between two windows on either side; each window is a 12/1 sash with dark black shutters.

Above the main door is a double French door with transom windows which opens onto the second floor of the veranda. The door is flanked by two windows that match the lower windows. A hipped roof tops the main block of the house and is pierced by three dormer windows. Two large brick chimneys sit to either side of the main part of the house.

A wraparound porch stretches off to either side of the house. A porte-cochere sits to the east of the house. Simple Doric columns line the porch and porte-cochere and add a classic touch to the home. A gabled projection juts from the center of the house on the east and west exposures.
