= 1928 Ohio gubernatorial election =

- November 6, 1928
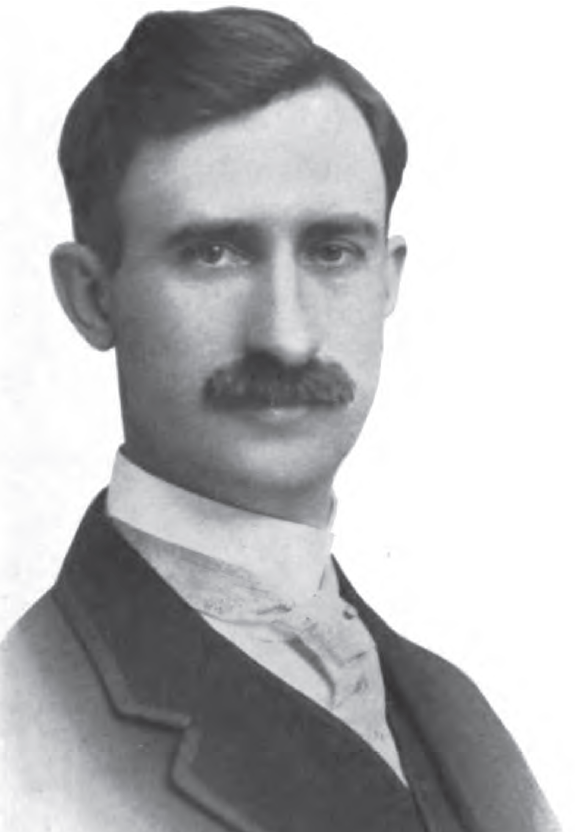

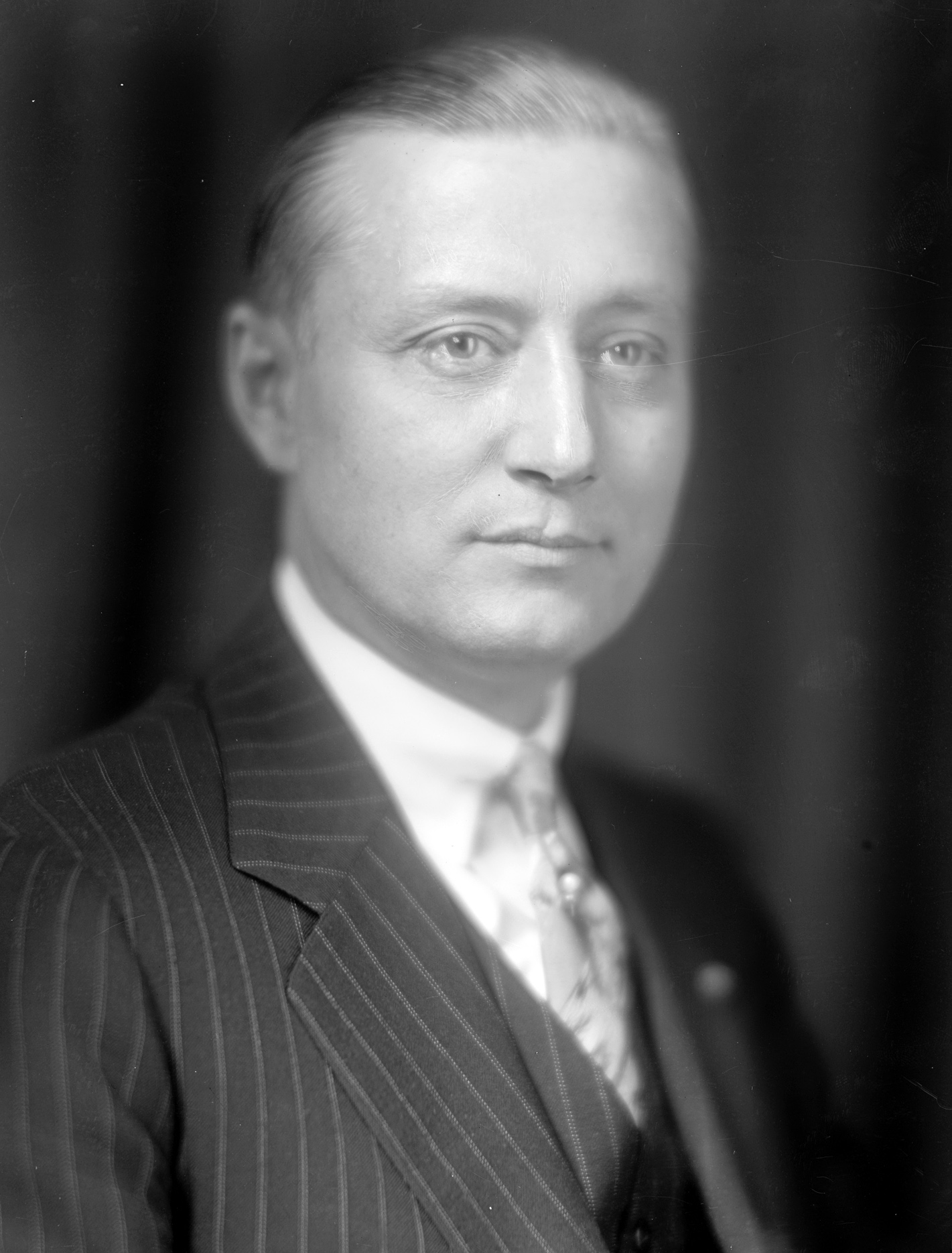
Nominee	Myers Y. Cooper	Martin L. Davey
Party	Republican	Democratic
Popular vote	1,355,517	1,106,739
Percentage	54.79%	44.74%
- County results Cooper: 40–50% 50–60% 60–70% 70–80% Davey: 50–60% 60–70%
Governor before election
A. Victor Donahey
Democratic
Elected Governor
Myers Y. Cooper
Republican

The 1928 Ohio gubernatorial election was held on November 6, 1928. Republican nominee Myers Y. Cooper defeated Democratic nominee Martin L. Davey with 54.79% of the vote.

== General election ==
=== Candidates ===
Major party candidates

- Myers Y. Cooper, Republican
- Martin L. Davey, Democratic

Other candidates

- Joseph Sharts, Socialist
- William Patterson, Workers
- John D. Goerke, Socialist Labor
- Frank W. Stanton, Prohibition

=== Results ===
1928 Ohio gubernatorial election
Party	Candidate	Votes	%	±%
Republican	Myers Y. Cooper	1,355,517	54.79%	
Democratic	Martin L. Davey	1,106,739	44.74%	
Socialist	Joseph Sharts	7,149	0.29%	
Workers	William Patterson	2,184	0.09%	
Socialist Labor	John D. Goerke	1,272	0.05%	
Prohibition	Frank W. Stanton	1,085	0.04%	
Majority		248,778		
Turnout				
Republican gain from Democratic		Swing		
