= Sharts =

Sharts is a surname. Notable people with the surname include:

- Hannah Sharts (born 1999), American soccer player
- Joseph Sharts (1875–1965), American writer

== See also ==
- Shart (disambiguation)
