= 1930 Ohio gubernatorial election =

- November 4, 1930
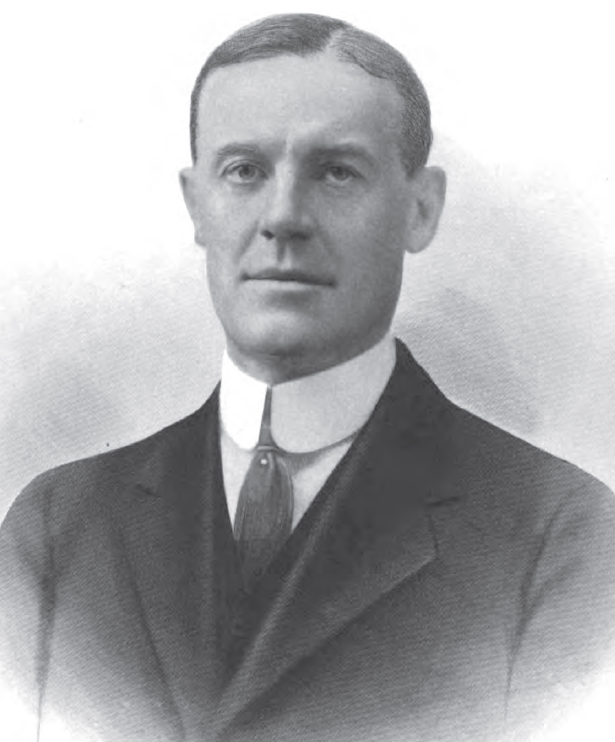

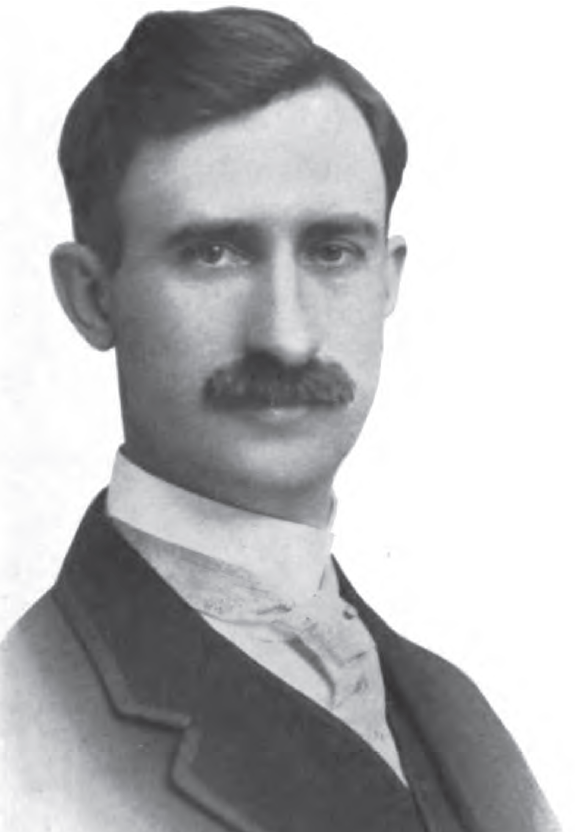
Nominee	George White	Myers Y. Cooper
Party	Democratic	Republican
Popular vote	1,033,168	923,538
Percentage	52.80%	47.20%
- County results White: 50–60% 60–70% Cooper: 50–60% 60–70%
Governor before election
Myers Y. Cooper
Republican
Elected Governor
George White
Democratic

The 1930 Ohio gubernatorial election was held on November 4, 1930. Democratic nominee George White defeated incumbent Republican Myers Y. Cooper with 52.80% of the vote.

== General election ==
=== Candidates ===
- George White, Democratic
- Myers Y. Cooper, Republican

=== Results ===
1930 Ohio gubernatorial election
Party	Candidate	Votes	%	±%
Democratic	George White	1,033,168	52.80%	
Republican	Myers Y. Cooper (incumbent)	923,538	47.20%	
Majority		109,630		
Turnout				
Democratic gain from Republican		Swing		
