= Keith O'Brien (author) =

American author and journalist

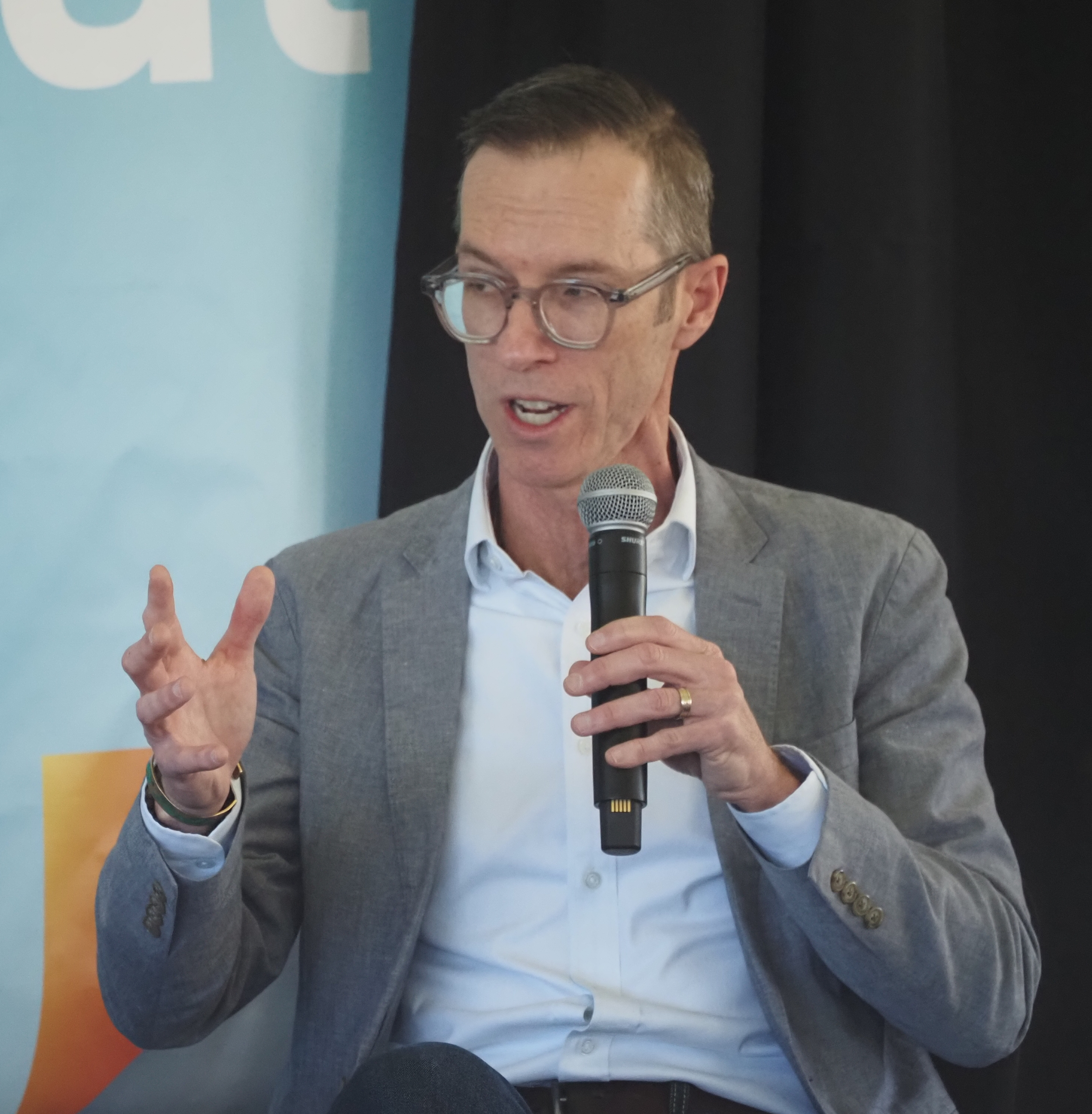
- at the 2026 Gaithersburg Book Festival
- Awards: Ohio Book Award

Keith O'Brien is an American author and journalist.

== Biography ==
O'Brien is a native of Anderson Township, Ohio. He graduated from St. Xavier High School in 1991 before graduating from Northwestern University in 1995 with a degree in history. He lives in New Hampshire with his wife and two children.

== Bibliography ==
- Charlie Hustle: The Rise and Fall of Pete Rose, and the Last Glory Days of Baseball (2024)
- Paradise Falls: The True Story of an Environmental Catastrophe (2022)
- Fly Girls: How Five Daring Women Defied All Odds and Made Aviation History (2018)
- with Colten Moore Catching the Sky: Two Brothers, One Family, and Our Dream to Fly (2017)
- Outside Shot: Big Dreams, Hard Times, and One County's Quest for Basketball Greatness (2013)

== Awards ==
O'Brien's Charlie Hustle won the Ohioana Library's 2025 Ohio Book Award in the category About Ohio or an Ohioan.
