= 1930 United States Senate special election in Ohio =

- November 4, 1930
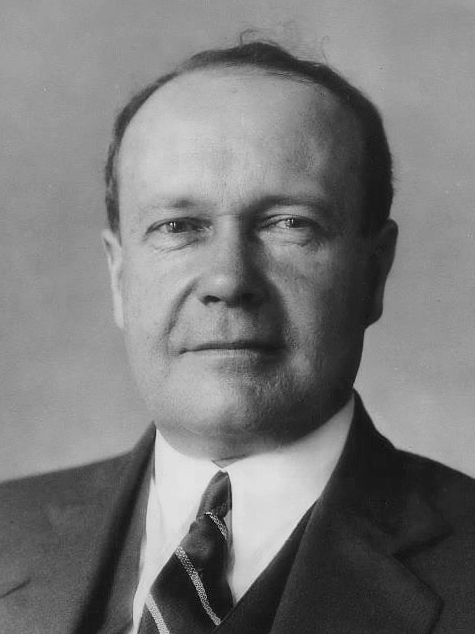

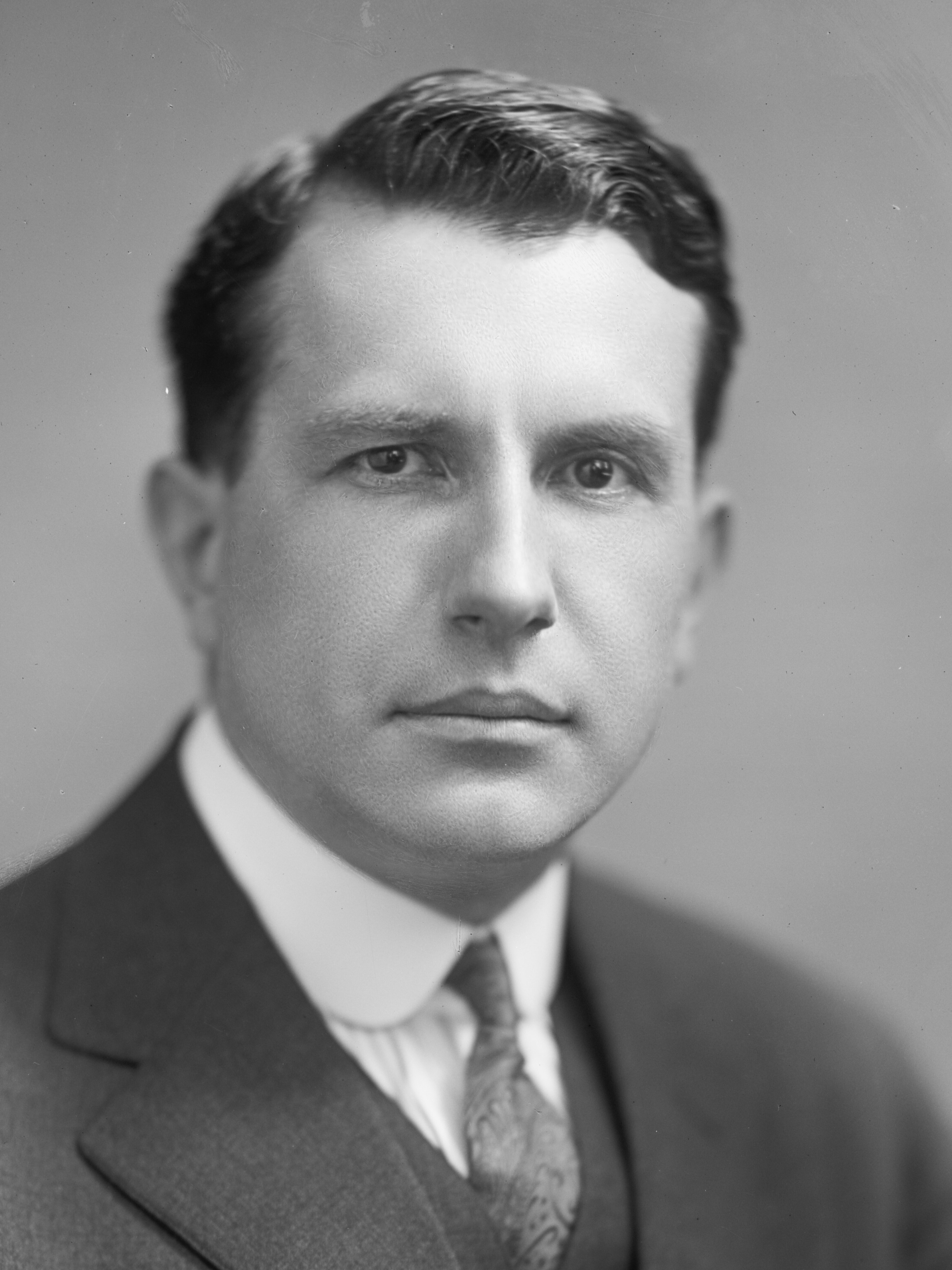
Nominee	Robert J. Bulkley	Roscoe C. McCulloch
Party	Democratic	Republican
Popular vote	1,046,561	863,944
Percentage	54.78%	45.22%
- County results Bulkley: 50–60% 60–70% 70–80% McCulloch: 50–60% 60–70% 70–80%
United States Senator before election
Roscoe C. McCulloch
Republican
Elected United States Senator
Robert J. Bulkley
Democratic

The 1930 United States Senate special election in Ohio was held on Tuesday November 4, to elect a successor to Senator Theodore E. Burton, who died in office in October 1929. United States Representative Roscoe C. McCulloch, who was appointed to fill the vacant seat, was to complete the term but was defeated by United States Representative Robert J. Bulkley.

== General election ==
=== Candidates ===
- Robert J. Bulkley, U.S. Representative from Cleveland (Democratic)
- Roscoe C. McCulloch, interim appointee Senator and former U.S. Representative from Canton (Republican)

=== Results ===
1930 U.S. Senate election in Ohio
Party	Candidate	Votes	%	±%
Democratic	Robert J. Bulkley	1,046,561	54.78%	▲17.46
Republican	Roscoe C. McCulloch (incumbent)	863,944	45.22%	▼17.21
Total votes		1,910,505	100.00%	

== See also ==
- 1930 United States Senate elections
