= 1926 Ohio gubernatorial election =

- November 2, 1926
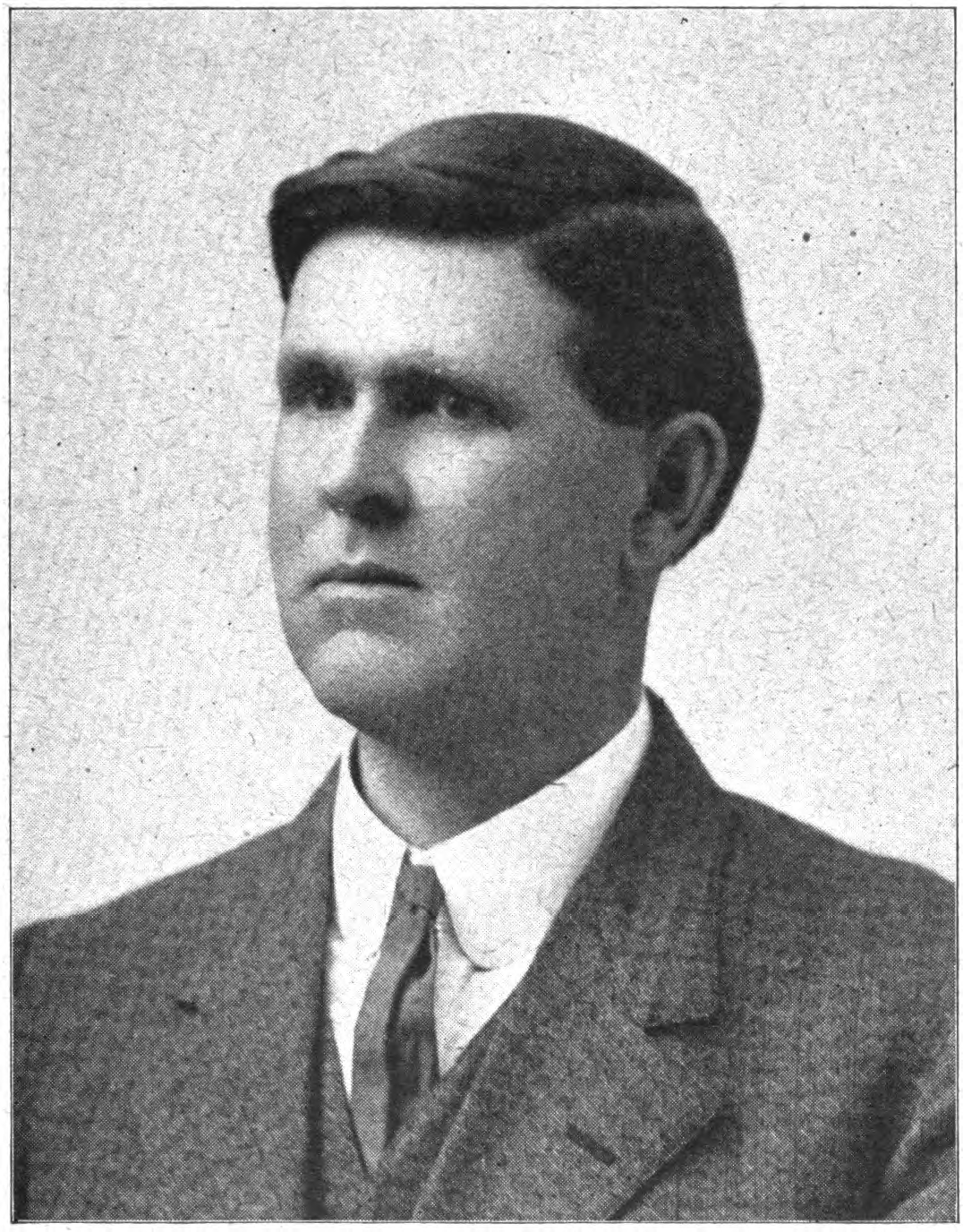

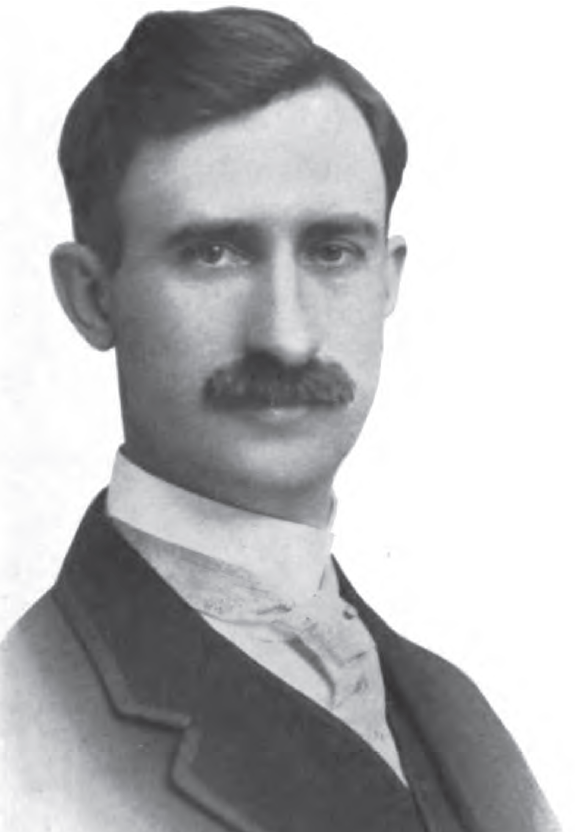
Nominee	A. Victor Donahey	Myers Y. Cooper
Party	Democratic	Republican
Popular vote	702,733	685,957
Percentage	50.33%	49.13%
- County results Donahey: 40–50% 50–60% 60–70% Cooper: 40–50% 50–60% 60–70%
Governor before election
A. Victor Donahey
Democratic
Elected Governor
A. Victor Donahey
Democratic

The 1926 Ohio gubernatorial election was held on November 2, 1926. Incumbent Democrat A. Victor Donahey defeated Republican nominee Myers Y. Cooper with 50.33% of the vote.

== General election ==
=== Candidates ===
Major party candidates

- A. Victor Donahey, Democratic
- Myers Y. Cooper, Republican

Other candidates

- Joseph Sharts, Socialist
- Walter Freeman, Socialist Labor

=== Results ===
1926 Ohio gubernatorial election
Party	Candidate	Votes	%	±%
Democratic	A. Victor Donahey (incumbent)	702,733	50.33%	
Republican	Myers Y. Cooper	685,957	49.13%	
Socialist	Joseph Sharts	5,985	0.43%	
Socialist Labor	Walter Freeman	1,597	0.11%	
Majority		16,776		
Turnout				
Democratic hold		Swing		
