= 1932 United States Senate election in Ohio =

- November 8, 1932
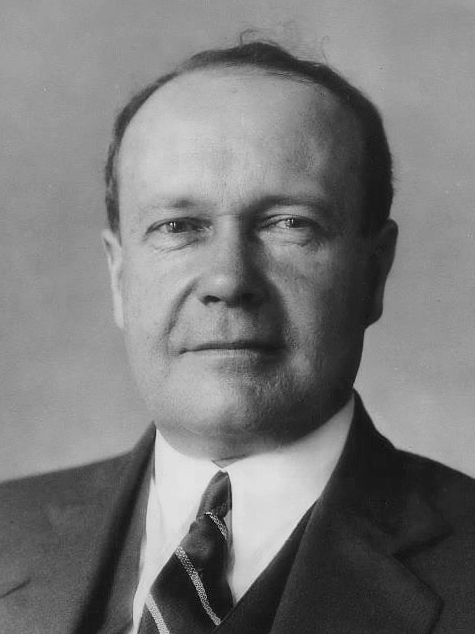

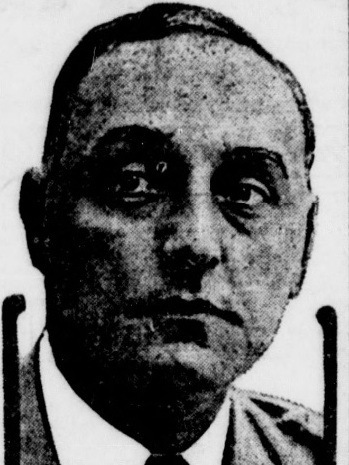
Nominee	Robert J. Bulkley	Gilbert Bettman
Party	Democratic	Republican
Popular vote	1,293,175	1,126,832
Percentage	52.53%	45.77%
- County results Bulkley: 40–50% 50–60% 60–70% 70–80% Bettman: 40–50% 50–60%
U.S. senator before election
Robert J. Bulkley
Democratic
Elected U.S. Senator
Robert J. Bulkley
Democratic

The 1932 United States Senate election in Ohio took place on November 8, 1932. Incumbent Senator Robert J. Bulkley, who was elected to complete the unexpired term of Frank Willis, was elected to a full term in office. This would be the last time that Democrats would win Ohio Class 3 Senate seat until Frank Lausche did so in 1956.

== General election ==
=== Candidates ===
- Gilbert Bettman, Attorney General of Ohio (Republican)
- Robert J. Bulkley, incumbent Senator since 1930 (Democratic)
- I. O. Ford (Socialist)
- Frank M. Mecartney (Prohibition)

=== Results ===
1932 U.S. Senate election in Ohio
Party	Candidate	Votes	%	±%
Democratic	Robert J. Bulkley (incumbent)	1,293,175	52.53%	▼2.25
Republican	Gilbert Bettman	1,126,832	45.77%	▲0.55
Prohibition	Frank M. Mecartney	34,760	1.41%	N/A
Socialist	I. O. Ford	7,227	0.29%	N/A
Total votes		2,461,994	100.00%	

== See also ==
- 1932 United States Senate elections
