= Shart =

Shart may refer to:

- Shart (1954 film), a Bollywood film starring Shashikala
- Shart (1986 film), a Bollywood film starring Shabana Azmi
- Shart (1969 film), a Bollywood film starring Sanjay Khan
- Shart: The Challenge, a 2004 Bollywood film starring Tusshar Kapoor
- "Shart", a song by Sonu Nigam from the Milan Talkies film soundtrack, 2019
- Raffy Shart, French-Armenian director and writer
- Melissa Shart, a fictional character in the TV series The Last Man on Earth
- Slang for accidental fecal incontinence

== See also ==
- Sharts (disambiguation)
