= Ohioana Library =

Library in Columbus, Ohio, United States

The Ohioana Library Association (also referred to as Ohioana Library or the Martha Kinney Cooper Ohioana Library) is a 501(c)(3) nonprofit organization based in Columbus, Ohio, United States, dedicated to collecting, preserving, and promoting the literary and creative works of Ohioans. Founded in 1929 by First Lady Martha Kinney Cooper, it holds one of the most comprehensive archives of books, music, and other materials by or about Ohio authors and artists. The organization is notable for its annual Ohio Book Awards, which are among the oldest state literary prizes in the United States.

== History ==
The Ohioana Library was established in 1929 by Martha Norma Kinney Cooper, wife of Ohio Governor Myers Y. Cooper. Shortly after moving into the Governor's Mansion in early 1929, Kinney Cooper discovered that none of the books on the mansion's shelves had been written by Ohio authors. This absence inspired her to create an institution dedicated to preserving Ohio's cultural heritage.

The library was created under the direction of Depew Head and was specifically designed to house the works of Ohioans. Ohio became the first state to found a library dedicated exclusively to the works of its own authors.

Kinney Cooper actively cultivated relationships with authors and interest groups to build the collection. Each spring she hosted a tea for Hamilton County authors at her Cincinnati home, and she developed connections with members of the National League of American Pen Women. One such member, Clara Heflebower, went on to serve as secretary of the Ohioana Library committee. She also enlisted the Ohio Federation of Women's Clubs to help collect and catalog books written by Ohioans.

=== Early growth ===
The library's first home was in the Governor's Mansion, where bookcases were installed along the walls of the Solarium to house the initial collection. By 1931, the library already held more than 600 volumes, all collected as donations from the authors themselves. As a nonprofit, the collection grew without a purchasing budget, relying entirely on contributions.

The collection quickly outgrew the Governor's Mansion and was relocated to the State Library of Ohio. Kinney Cooper remained active with the library until her death on April 20, 1964. On August 30, 1978, she was posthumously inducted into the Ohio Women's Hall of Fame.

=== Later relocations ===
The library resided in the State Office Building at 65 South Front Street in Columbus for several decades. In January 2001, it relocated to 274 East First Avenue, Suite 300, Columbus, Ohio, where it is now co-located with the State Library of Ohio in the renovated Jeffrey Mining Corporate Center.

=== Governance ===
The Ohioana Library Association is governed by a Board of Trustees of up to 28 members drawn from across Ohio. It is supported through memberships, subscriptions, private contributions, and a subsidy from the State of Ohio.

=== Ohio Book Awards ===
First presented in 1942, the Ohio Book Awards honor Ohio authors in fiction, nonfiction, poetry, and juvenile literature. They are the second-oldest state literary prize in the nation. Each year, juried awards are given in seven categories: Fiction, Nonfiction, Poetry, About Ohio or an Ohioan, Young Adult Literature, Middle Grade Literature, and Juvenile Literature.

In addition, the Walter Marvin Grant (commonly called the Marvin Grant) is a $1,000 cash award given annually to an Ohio writer age 30 or younger who has not yet published a book.
