= Roscoe C. McCulloch =

American politician (1880–1958)

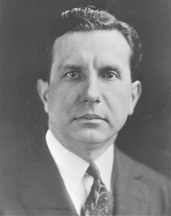

United States Senator from Ohio
- In office November 5, 1929 – November 30, 1930
- Appointed by: Myers Y. Cooper
- Preceded by: Theodore E. Burton
- Succeeded by: Robert J. Bulkley

Member of the U.S. House of Representatives from Ohio's 16th district
- In office March 4, 1915 – March 3, 1921
- Preceded by: William B. Francis
- Succeeded by: Joseph H. Himes

Personal details
- Born: Roscoe Conkling McCulloch; November 27, 1880 Millersburg, Ohio, U.S.
- Died: March 17, 1958 (aged 77) West Palm Beach, Florida, U.S.
- Party: Republican

Roscoe Conkling McCulloch (November 27, 1880 – March 17, 1958) was a Republican politician from Ohio who served in the United States House of Representatives and U.S. Senate.

== Early life and career ==
Born in Millersburg, Ohio, McCulloch attended the University of Wooster, Ohio State University and Case Western Reserve University School of Law. He commenced the practice of law in Canton, Ohio, in 1903.

== Political career ==
=== House of Representatives ===
After serving as an assistant prosecutor in Stark County, he ran for the House in 1912. He lost, but won a second bid two years later and served three terms from 1915 to 1921. In 1920, he unsuccessfully sought the Republican nomination for governor.

=== Senate ===
He was appointed to the U.S. Senate on November 5, 1929, to fill the vacancy created by the death of Theodore E. Burton. He lost a special election on November 30, 1930, to Robert J. Bulkley to fill out the remainder of the term.

== Death ==
He died on March 17, 1958, in West Palm Beach, Florida, at the age of 77.

== See also ==
- Ohio's 16th congressional district
- List of United States Senate elections in Ohio

Party political offices
Preceded by Theodore E. Burton	Republican nominee for U.S. Senator from Ohio (Class 3); 1930	Succeeded by Gilbert Bettman
U.S. House of Representatives
Preceded by William B. Francis	Member of the U.S. House of Representatives from Ohio's 16th congressional district 1915–1921	Succeeded by Joseph H. Himes
U.S. Senate
Preceded by Theodore E. Burton	United States Senator (Class 3) from Ohio; 1929–1930	Succeeded by Robert J. Bulkley
