= Workers Defense Union =

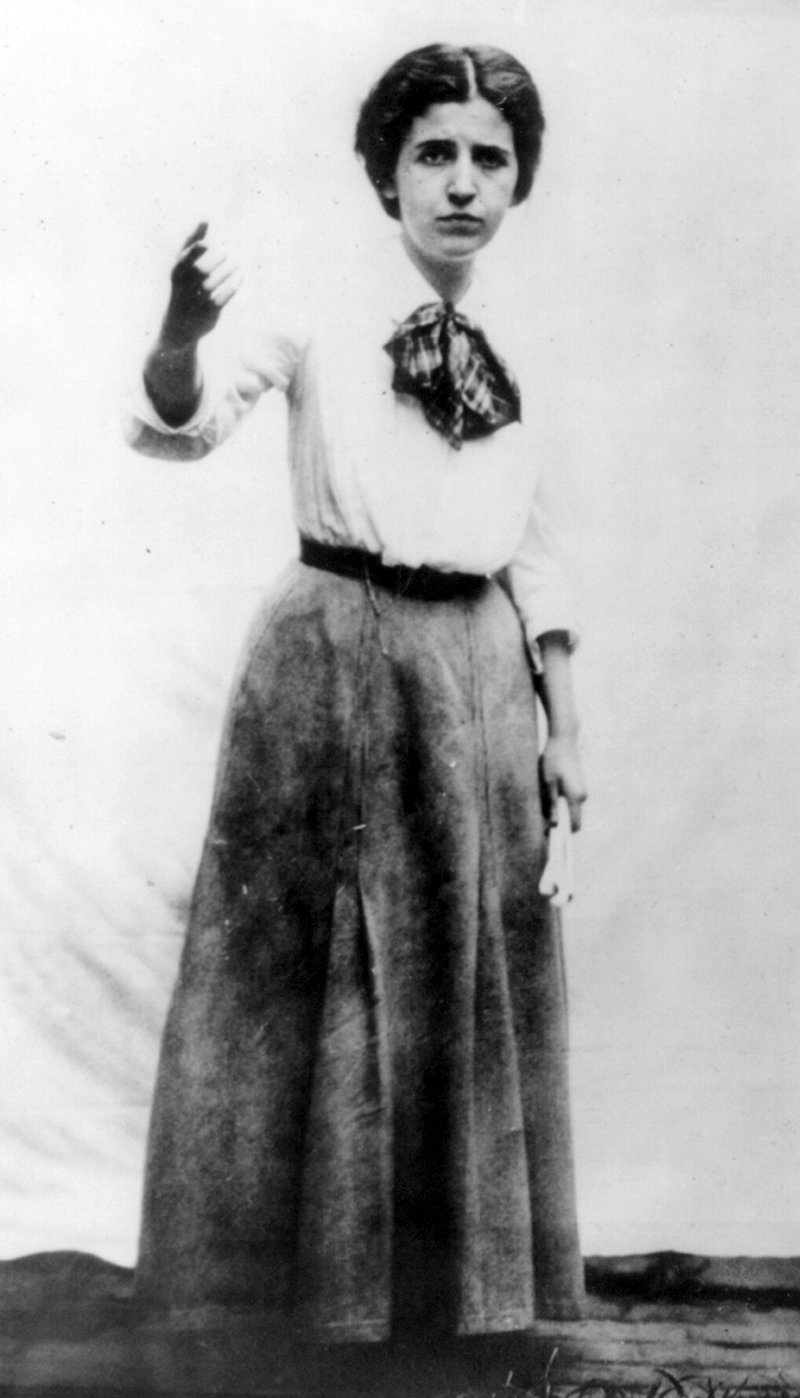
Free speech activist and union organizer Elizabeth Gurley Flynn was the creator and Secretary of the Workers Defense Union, established in November 1918.

The Workers Defense Union (WDU) was a legal defense organization in the United States, established in New York City in November 1918 to lend aid in cases involving trade union and radical political activists. The group was organized by Industrial Workers of the World organizer Elizabeth Gurley Flynn, working closely with radical trade unionist Fred Biedenkapp. Both would subsequently become active members of the Workers (Communist) Party of America. The WDU became a local affiliate of the American Civil Liberties Union in 1920, with Flynn joining the National Committee of that organization, before finally dissolving as an independent entity in 1923.

== Organizational history ==
=== Establishment ===
The last decades of the 19th century and first decades of the 20th century were marked by violent labor and political conflict in the United States. Efforts at labor organization or to hold political gatherings or demonstrations were periodically met with violence from private guards, police, or state militias. The entrance of the United States into World War I in the spring of 1917 further intensified the process, with the May passage Selective Service Act of 1917 and the June passage of the Espionage Act of 1917 marking the start of a campaign against conscientious objectors and political dissidents.

In New York City, political organizer Roger Nash Baldwin and attorney Albert DeSilver established the National Civil Liberties Bureau to coordinate the work of liberal and radical lawyers in the legal defense of this new class of American political criminals, who by 1918 numbered more than 1,500. This was not the only effort at coordinating legal defense efforts for the hundreds of members of Socialists, Wobblies, and conscientious objectors facing prosecution. Believing the Civil Liberties Bureau was not equal to the task of nationally organizing publicity and fundraising efforts on behalf of political prisoners, a stillborn effort called the Liberty Defense Union was made by IWW organizer Elizabeth Gurley Flynn.

Flynn had an extensive history with the legal system as a defendant in various prosecutions relating to free speech actions and union organizing. Flynn had been arrested for her IWW organizing activities as part of the 1912 Lawrence Textile Strike, facing a seven-year prison term in a trial which was held in June 1913, gaining her freedom when the jury deadlocked over the question of conviction. Later Flynn had spent the better part of a year raising public awareness and funds on behalf of condemned IWW activist Joe Hill, who was ultimately executed by firing squad in the state of Utah in November 1915. In 1917, Flynn was the only woman arrested in September 1917 in a nationwide operation aimed at decapitating the leadership of the IWW organization — an effort which jailed more than 100 leaders and activists of that organization. Flynn had been held in New York City's Tombs prison until $10,000 had been raised for her bail; her case was severed from the main group of defendants in February 1918 and finally dismissed only in March 1919.

Flynn was unable to persuade a sufficient number of high-profile public intellectuals and attorneys to join her effort, however, and the plan was soon abandoned, with its remaining assets distributed to a subcommittee of National Civil Liberties Bureau headed by Charles Ervin, editor of the Socialist daily The New York Call, and economics professor without portfolio Scott Nearing.

Early in November 1918 another effort was made at a national defense organization, this time in conjunction with the Civil Liberties Bureau. This was a group called the Workers Defense Union, launched with $250 of Civil Liberty Bureau funds, sufficient to pay Flynn for six weeks. The group was conceived as a mechanism to enable activists from a variety of sometimes antagonistic political organizations to work together on common tasks in the realm of legal defense, with an emphasis upon working class defendants and solicitation of trade unions for financial support.

=== Structure ===
The Workers Defense Union issued a number of politically-charged leaflets in support of its cause, including this 1919 piece written by Ohio attorney Joseph Sharts.

A conference which formally founded the WDU and elected its officers was held in a hall owned by The Jewish Daily Forward on December 18, 1918. The gathering was attended by delegates from 163 trade unions, political groups, and social service organizations. A subsequent meeting held January 5, 1919, adopted a program for the organization and resolutions on specific actions.

Flynn was chosen as Secretary of the organization, joined in her efforts by Financial Secretary-Treasurer Fred Biedenkapp of the Brotherhood of Metal Workers, a radical trade unionist. The publicity director was Eugene Lyons, a radical sympathizer in his younger years who would turn to conservative anti-communism in the second half of the 1930s. The national field organizer was veteran member of the Socialist Party Ella Reeve Bloor.

The WDU maintained an office in the building occupied by the Rand School of Social Science, located at 7 East 15th Street in New York City. Flynn's office was located in the Rand School building, a small back room of a larger office rented by Biedenkapp's Brotherhood of Metal Workers. The spartan room had bars over the windows and faced an enclosed air shaft, an ambiance which Flynn later recalled made her feel like she was herself in jail, fighting for her own liberty as well as the prisoners which her organization sought to liberate. In 1922 a move was made by the Brotherhood of Metal Workers and the Workers Defense Union to new facilities, located at 80 East 10th Street.

Initial funding for the organization, which was initially known as the "Workers Liberty Defense Union", was provided by Roger Baldwin's National Civil Liberties Bureau, forerunner of the ACLU. National Civil Liberties Bureau funding ran out midway through January 1919 and thereafter the WDU was left to its own devices to cover its operating expenses. Additional funds were provided by various progressive trade unions, including the Amalgamated Clothing Workers of America, the International Ladies' Garment Workers' Union, and the Furriers' Union. Its efforts were additionally endorsed by the Socialist Party.

Although Flynn and Biedenkapp was the individuals maintaining day-to-day operations of the WDU, the group was nominally controlled by a National Committee, which included a number of prominent civil libertarians of various political allegiances, including Chicago poverty worker Jane Addams, Nation magazine editor Oswald Garrison Villard, activist clergyman such as Frank A. Ryan, Harry F. Ward, and Judah L. Magnes, prominent labor lawyer Frank P. Walsh, muckraking writer Frederic C. Howe, and trade unionist Rose Schneiderman, among others.

=== Strategy ===
The WDU was an explicitly radical organization and sought to aid so-called "victims of capitalist class tyranny" who had run afoul of the legal system in various contexts. The organization sought to provide immediate, basic legal defense in the hopes of allaying more severe charges and expediting a favorable outcome. A representative of the WDU briefly detailed his organization's legal strategy in a presentation to the biennial convention of the Cloth Hat and Cap Makers of North America in May 1919:

...Ofttimes a legal defense at the time of arrest — the first time of arrest — will prevent a lot of unpleasant work afterwards. If we have a good lawyer to represent them at the primary court, ofttimes the prisoners are discharges or a minor charge is placed against them. If the prisoners are there without a legal defense, ofttimes the charge is perverted so as to make it really an international offense, and instead of being discharged or given a small fine or short term of imprisonment, they are turned over to the Federal authorities and there they get from 10 to 20 years on the charge of Espionage.

In addition to providing legal defense in criminal charges relating to political or union activity, the WDU also provided legal assistance for resident alien workers threatened with deportation by the Bureau of Immigration as a result of their radical political affiliations.

To publicize its efforts, the WDU published a monthly magazine, the Workers Defense Bulletin. The editor of the publication, which launched on April 15, 1919, was Eugene Lyons.

=== Dissolution ===
In January 1920 the wartime National Civil Liberties Bureau headed by Roger Baldwin dissolved, in favor of a new permanent organization called the American Civil Liberties Union (ACLU). As part of the call to establish the new organization, the Workers Defense Union was asked to ally itself with the ACLU as a local affiliate. Elizabeth Gurley Flynn became a founding member of the National Committee of the ACLU, remaining in that post until pressured to resign in 1940 in the anti-communist climate which surrounded the signing of the Molotov–Ribbentrop Pact.

The Workers Defense Union continued its independent activities until the group was dissolved in 1923.

== See also ==
- American Civil Liberties Union
- International Labor Defense

== Publications ==
- Program of the Workers Defense Union. New York: Workers Defense Union, n.d. [1919].
- Who Are the Murderers? New York: Workers Defense Union, n.d. [May 1919].
- Justice Later. New York: Workers Defense Union, n.d. [1919].
- Joseph W. Sharts, An Open Letter to You President Wilson. New York: Workers Defense Union, n.d. [1919].
- Dumb Submission or Deportation? New York: Workers Defense Union, n.d. [c. 1919].
- Russian Pogroms in America. New York: Workers Defense Union, n.d. [c. 1919].
- Lumber vs. Labor. New York: Workers Defense Union, n.d. [c. 1919].
- Are They Doomed? New York: Workers Defense Union, n.d. [c. 1919].
- Using the Espionage Act to Terrorize Labor; Some Judicial Atrocities. New York: Workers Defense Union, 1919.
- Freedom for Political Prisoners. Workers: Make Monday, September 6, a Real Labor Day. New York: Workers Defense Union, n.d. [1920].
- Alexander Sidney Lanier, Justice to the IWW: Open Letter to the President. New York: Workers Defense Union, n.d. [1921].
- Art Shields, The Sacco-Vanzetti Case and the Grim Forces Behind It. New York: Workers Defense Union, n.d. [1921?].
