= Arthur H. Day =

American judge

Arthur Hiram Day
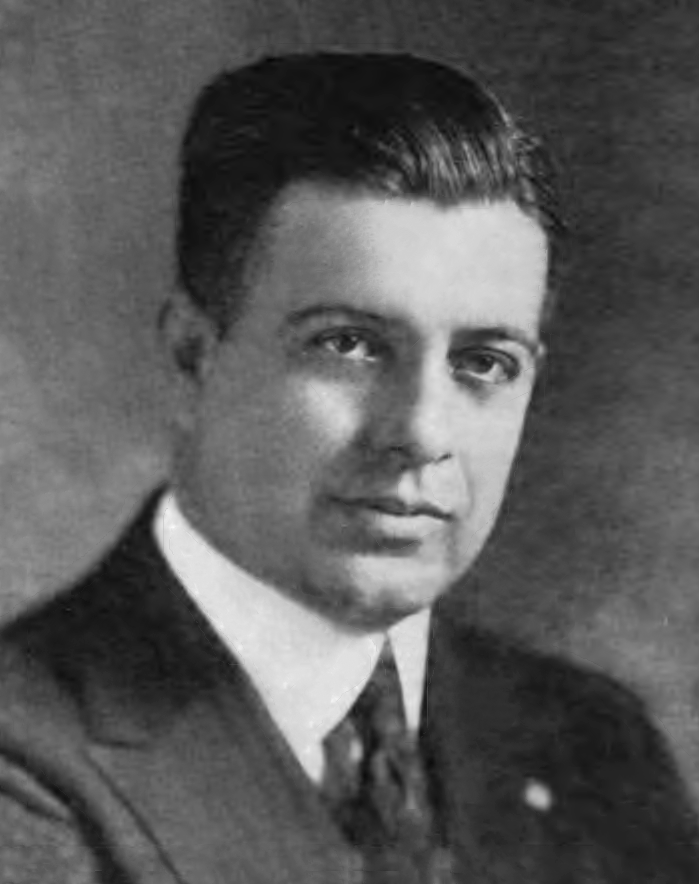

Justice of the Ohio Supreme Court
- In office January 1, 1935 – December 31, 1940
- Preceded by: William L. Hart
- Succeeded by: Gilbert Bettman

Member of the Ohio Senate from the 25th district
- In office January 3, 1921 – December 31, 1922
- In office January 5, 1925 – January 3, 1927

Personal details
- Born: February 1, 1890 Pandora, Ohio, U.S.
- Died: January 11, 1967 (aged 76) Cleveland, Ohio, U.S.
- Resting place: Holy Cross Cemetery, Cleveland
- Party: Republican
- Spouse(s): Clara Loring; Gertrude Medlin Bixby; Kathryn Mullen
- Children: Two
- Education: Ohio Wesleyan University; Cleveland Law School

Arthur Hiram Day (February 1, 1890 – January 11, 1967) was an American lawyer, politician, judge, and college football coach. A Republican, served two terms as an Ohio State Senator in the 1920s and a six-year term as a justice of the Ohio Supreme Court, from 1935 to 1940. Day was the head football coach at Trinity University in Waxahachie, Texas for one season, in 1912.

== Biography ==
Day was born on February 1, 1890, at Pandora, Ohio, to Hiram and Jessie Ayres Day. He attended Ohio Wesleyan University in Delaware, Ohio, where he played football, basketball, and baseball, and ran track before graduating in 1912 with an A.B. degree. In August 1912, Day was appointed physical director and coach at Trinity University in Waxahachie, Texas.

Day attended the Case Western Reserve University School of Law for one year, graduated from Cleveland Law School in 1916, and was admitted to the bar in June, 1916. He was Republican nominee for the Ohio House of Representatives in 1916. He was a captain in the United States Army from 1918 to 1919, member of the Allied Expeditionary Forces in World War I, and was wounded in action August 5, 1918.

Day was elected to the Ohio State Senate in 1921 and 1922, and served again in 1925. He was elected to the Cleveland Municipal Court in 1931, and to the Cuyahoga County Court of Common Pleas in 1932. He was elected to a six-year term to the Ohio Supreme Court in November 1934, and served January 1, 1935, to December 31, 1940. He ran in the Republican United States Senate primary against Robert A. Taft in 1938, but lost. He ran for re-election to the court in November, 1940, but lost to Gilbert Bettman.

Day lost election for Cuyahoga County Prosecuting Attorney in 1941, and was elected again to the Court of Common Pleas in 1942. He served four terms, was re-elected to a fifth but died before serving any of it on January 11, 1967. He died in Cleveland, and is buried at Holy Cross Cemetery.

== Family ==
Arthur H. Day was married to Clara Loring on January 28, 1919. He later married Gertrude Medlin Bixby, who had two children and died in 1940. He then married Kathryn Mullen.

Early in life, Arthur H. Day was a member of the Veterans of Foreign Wars, American Legion, Masons, Loyal Order of Moose, Sigma Alpha Epsilon, and Delta Theta Phi.

== Head coaching record ==
Year	Team	Overall	Conference	Standing	Bowl/playoffs
Trinity Tigers (Independent) (1912)
1912	Trinity	1–6			
Trinity:		1–6			
Total:		1–6			
