= William C. Mooney =

American politician

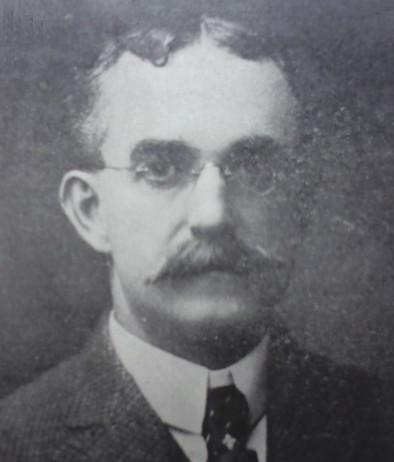

Member of the U.S. House of Representatives from Ohio's 15th district
- In office March 4, 1915 – March 3, 1917
- Preceded by: George White
- Succeeded by: George White

Personal details
- Born: William Crittenden Mooney; June 15, 1855 Beallsville, Ohio
- Died: July 24, 1918 (aged 63) New York City, New York
- Resting place: Oaklawn Cemetery in Woodsfield
- Party: Republican
- Spouse: Elizabeth Davenport Mooney
- Education: Ohio Wesleyan College
- Occupation: Banker

William Crittenden Mooney (June 15, 1855 – July 24, 1918) was a U.S. representative from Ohio. His parents were Colonel Samuel L. Mooney, a major figure in the development of Monroe County, and Martha Kirkpatrick.

== Early life ==
Born in Beallsville, Ohio, Mooney attended public school in town until his family moved to Woodsfield in 1862, at which time he attended Woodsfield Schools. After high school he attended Ohio Wesleyan College at Delaware. He became a book keeper with Taylor & Armstrong in Bellaire. He worked at that position for two years when, in 1894 he engaged in banking at Monroe Bank, which was chartered by his father. Mooney started as a clerk and moved his way up to teller and cashier, when in 1898, he was appointed as Vice President. At the same time he was appointed on the O.R.& W. Railway board of directors.

== Adulthood ==
Mooney married Elizabeth Davenport (May 10, 1856 - August 2, 1946) during this time, and was soon appointed to the Ohio Republican Executive Committee and as chairman of the County Republican Central Committee. He also began his long tenure as President and Treasurer of the Monroe County Agricultural Society. Mooney built and occupied his mansion house on Paul Street. When the courthouse burned down in 1905, he was appointed as one of the five-member Courthouse Commission charged with rebuilding the courthouse.

== Congressional Years ==
Mooney was elected as a Republican to the Sixty-fourth Congress (March 4, 1915 – March 3, 1917). He was an unsuccessful candidate for reelection in 1916 to the Sixty-fifth Congress.

=== After Congress ===
After leaving Congress, Mooney again engaged in banking at Monroe Bank as President.

== Death ==
He died in at the age of 63 in New York City on July 24, 1918. Mooney was ill prior to his death and died within 24 hours. He was interred in Oaklawn Cemetery in Woodsfield.

U.S. House of Representatives
Preceded by George White	Member of the U.S. House of Representatives from Ohio's 15th congressional district 1915–1917	Succeeded by George White
