= Start Westward Memorial =

Memorial to the "Start Westward of the United States"
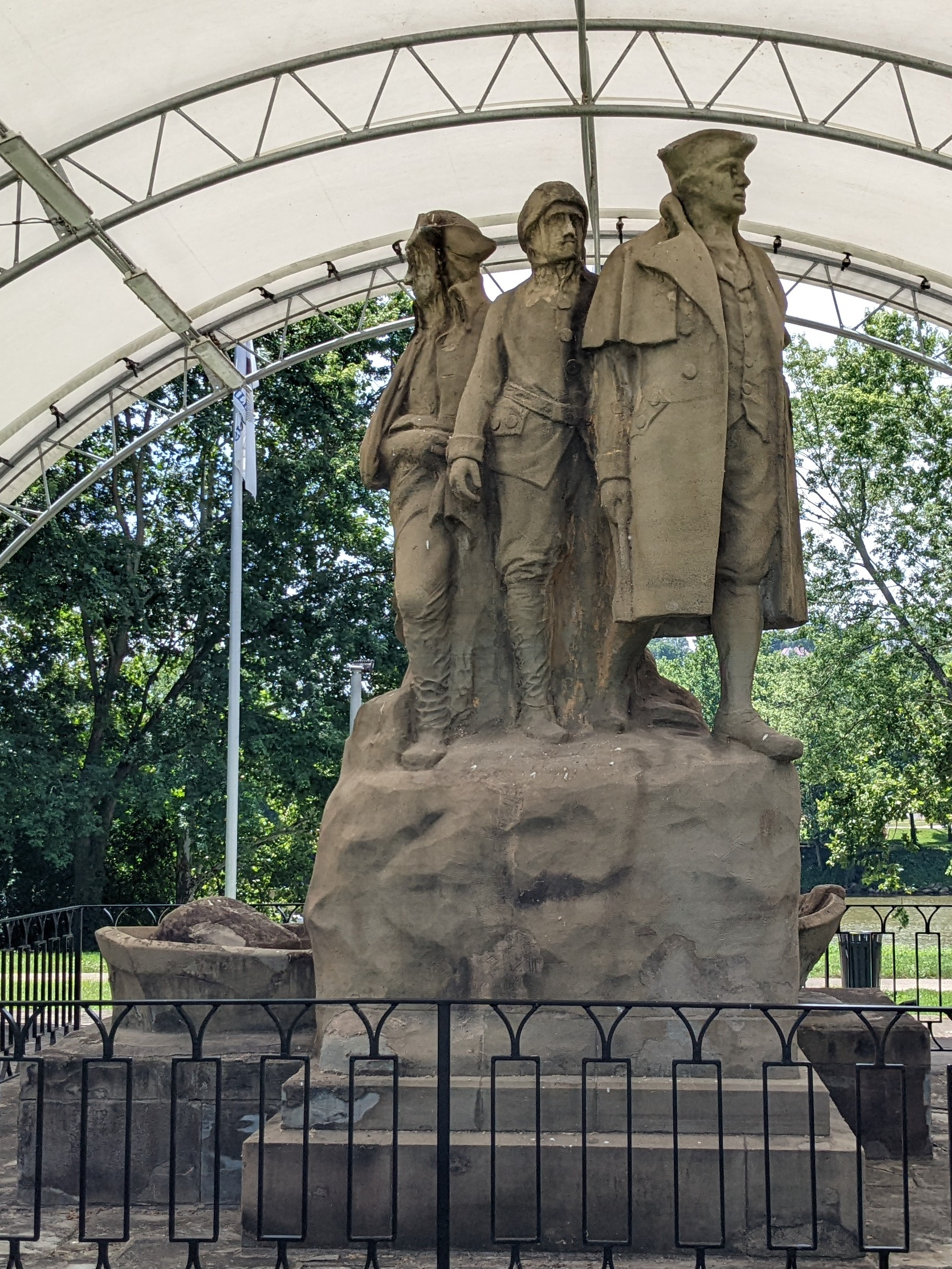
- The memorial under its temporary canopy, in 2022
- Artist: Gutzon Borglum
- Year: 1938
- Medium: Sandstone
- Location: Muskingum Park, Marietta, Ohio, United States
- 39.415664°N 81.457768°W
- Owner: City of Marietta / National Park Service (disputed)

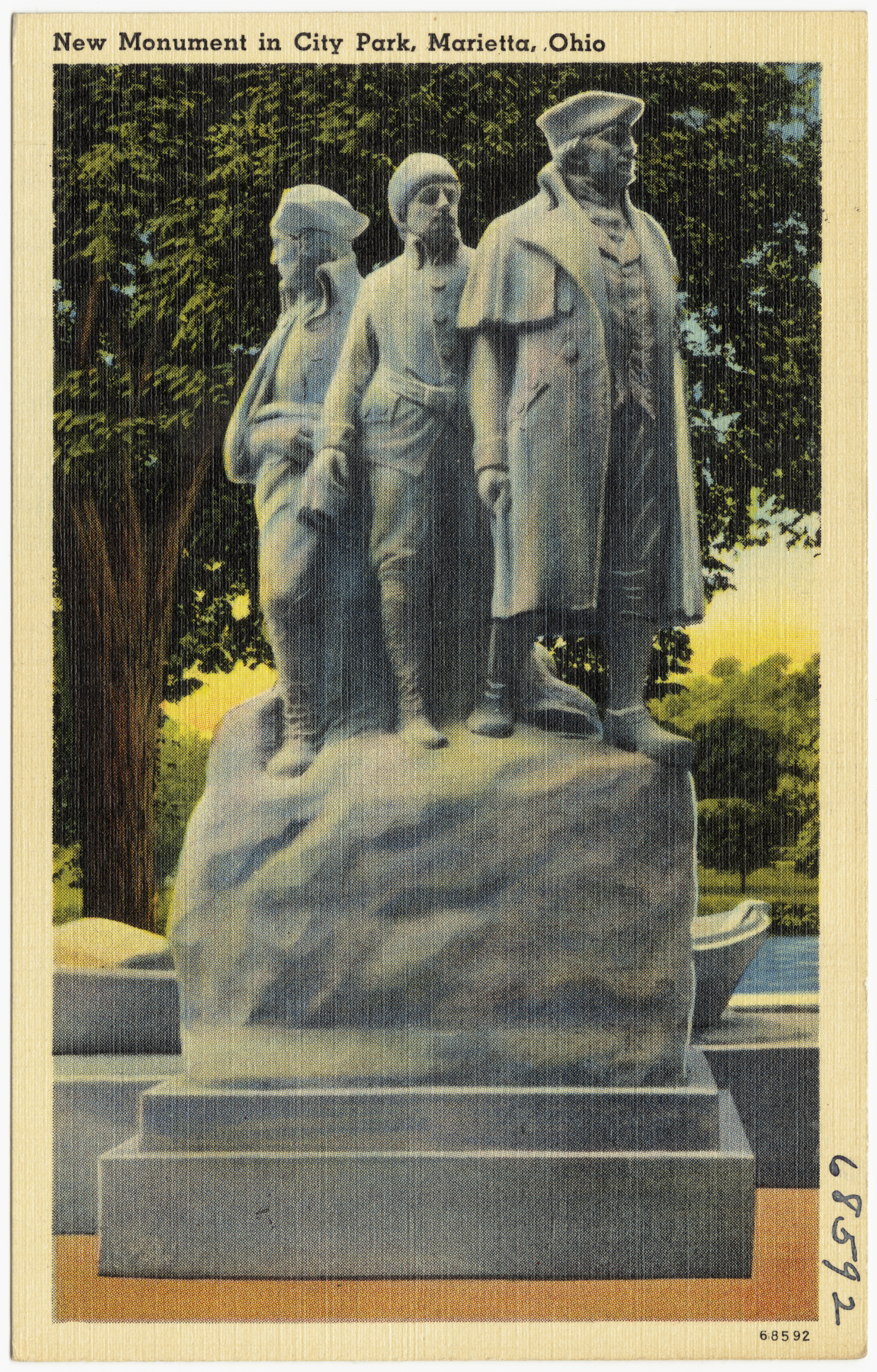
A 1938 postcard of the memorial

The Start Westward Memorial, officially known as the Memorial to the "Start Westward of the United States", also known as the National Start Westward Memorial of The United States or Start Westward Monument, is a 1938 sculpture designed by Gutzon Borglum and located in Muskingum Park in Marietta, Ohio, United States. Borglum agreed to take on the commission at the request of George White, his friend and former Governor of Ohio.

It commemorates the westward expansion of the United States, and the sesquicentennial of the establishment of Marietta in 1788. It stands on purpose-designed esplanade designed by Borglum and the architect John Schooley.

As the memorial has weathered badly, there are plans to recreate it in bronze, and move the original to a new indoor visitor center.

== Design and construction ==
Borglum visited Marietta in October 1936. He was asked by the former state governor, his friend George White, to design a sculpture to commemorate the Westward expansion of the United States, from its original thirteen states, the settlement of the Northwest Territory and the sesquicentennial (150th anniversary) of the establishment of Marietta in 1788. His appointment, by the Federal Commission for the Celebration of the 150th Anniversary of the Ordinance of 1787, was first announced on the front page of The Marietta Daily Times on November 18, 1936.

Borglum designed the memorial at his studio in San Antonio, Texas in late 1936 and 1937, working in plaster of Paris. From this full-scale rendering, a small clay maquette was made, and given to stonemasons engaged using Works Progress Administration funding as part of the New Deal. They sculpted the design from an 80-short-ton (73 t) block of sandstone from a quarry near the old lock number 18 on the Ohio River at a workshop at Briggs Station.

With its weight reduced to 25 short tons (23 t), the partially completed carving was moved ten miles (on a circuitous route to avoid a railroad bridge at Mile Run) on May 7, 1938 to Muskingum Park (then known as East Muskingum Park), Marietta, on the east bank of the Muskingum River, where work was completed. The chosen position is where Arthur St. Clair was inaugurated as first governor of the Northwest Territory.

The sculpture depicts three standing men on a rock, with two further men and a woman behind them, alongside a boat, to represent the first landing of pioneers. The figures wear eighteenth-century clothing.

With John Schooley, State Architect of Ohio, who worked pro bono, Borglum also designed the esplanade on which the statue sits. It includes anding stage on the riverbank.

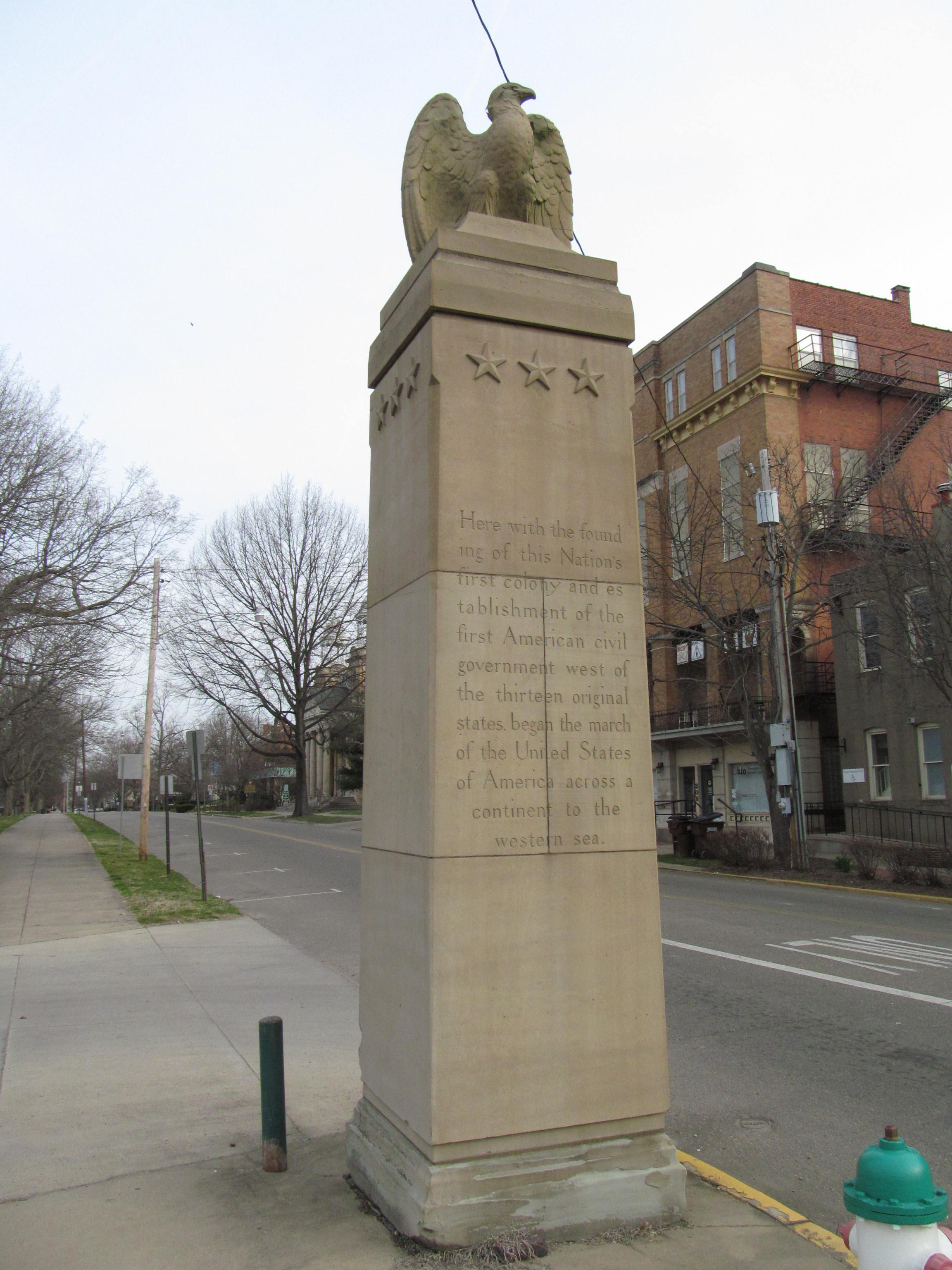
The Borglum sculpted eagle on Southwest side of Front Street

Borglum also sculpted four eagles, as a gift to the city, to top pylons, or obelisks, located at entrances to the park, on Front Street.

== Dedication ==
The memorial was dedicated by President Franklin D. Roosevelt on 8 July 1938. He traveled to Marietta by train from Washington D.C. Borglum refused to attend the ceremony, being unhappy with the reproduction of his work, as he believed the stone to be of inferior quality.

== Postage stamp ==
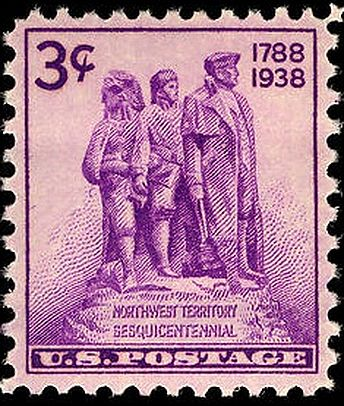
Northwest Territory settlement 1938 U.S. postage stamp

The sculpture featured on a 3¢ United States postage stamp, issued on July 15, 1938.

== Protection and restoration ==
Since its creation, the sculpture has weathered badly.

In April 1962 the head of the center standing pioneer, which broke in 1961, was replaced with one carved by Fred Mitchem and a silicone coating was applied to the work.

In August 1975 the head on the figure nearest the river had to be reattached.

On the 50th anniversary of the memorial's dedication, flagpoles, with the flags of the six states formed from the Northwest Territory, and the national flag, lighting and commemorative plaques were installed.

In readiness for the 250th anniversary of the founding of the United States, there have been moves to restore the memorial and the city of Marietta has commissioned a study in how best to do so. In 2020 the memorial was covered by a temporary canopy, to give some protection from the elements.

In August 2021 Marietta City Council approved a $7 million proposal by the Start Westward Memorial Society to replicate the memorial in bronze—in accordance with Borglum's original intention—and to move the original stone sculpture to an indoor Start Westward National Memorial Visitors Center, with a target completion date of Marietta's 250th anniversary in 2038.

== Ownership ==
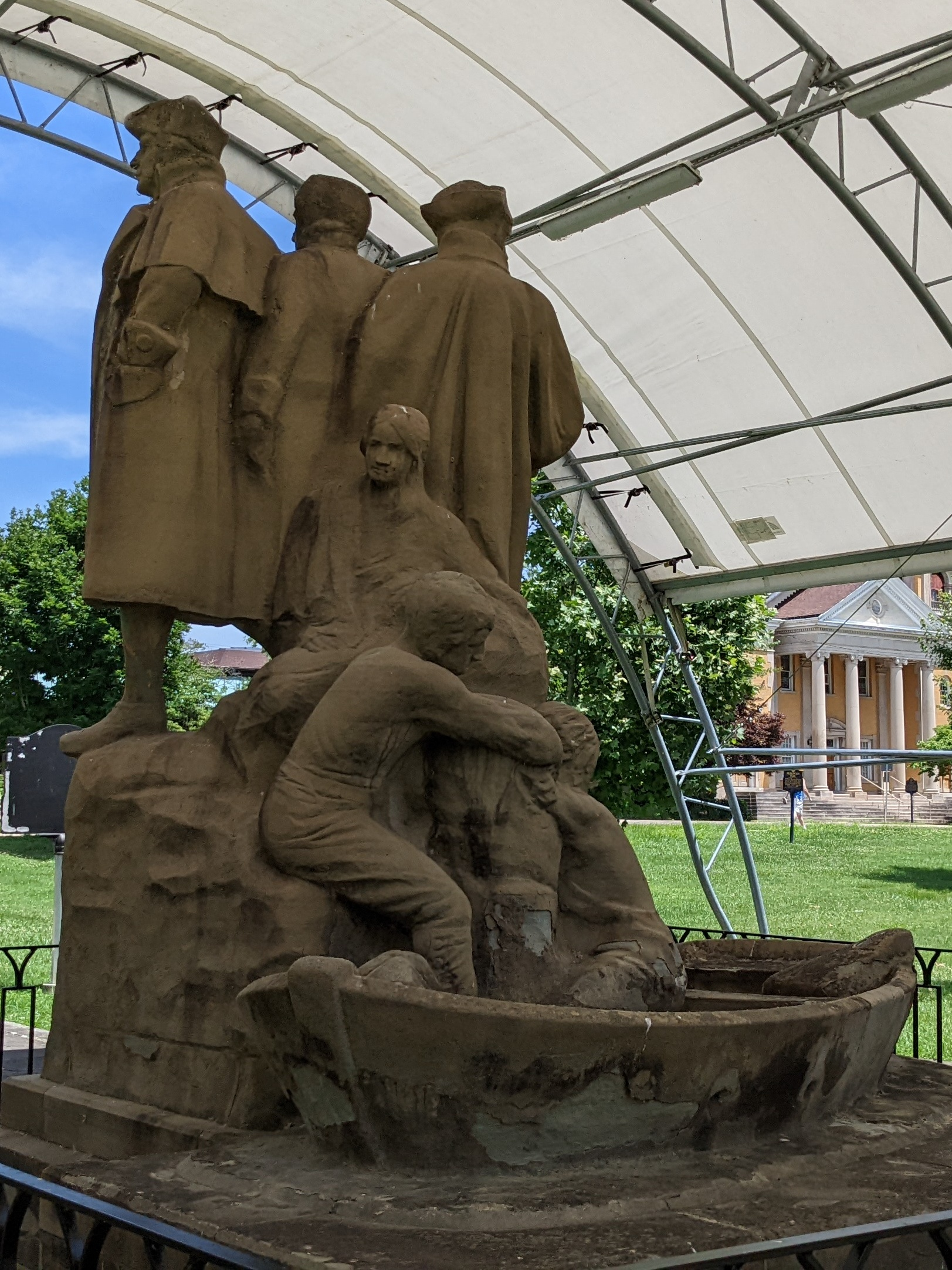
The rear of the monument

The ownership and responsibility for the care of the memorial is being discussed, as of 2022, between Marietta City Council and the National Park Service.
