= List of Ohio politicians =

This is a list of politicians from the U.S. state of Ohio.

== Current government and congressional delegation ==
=== Statewide elected executive officials ===
- Governor: Mike DeWine (R)
- Lieutenant Governor: Jim Tressel (R)
- Attorney General: Dave Yost (R)
- Auditor of State: Keith Faber (R)
- Secretary of State: Frank LaRose (R)
- Treasurer of State: Robert Sprague (R)

=== General Assembly leadership ===
==== Senate ====
- President of the Senate: Rob McColley (R)
- President Pro Tempore: Bill Reineke (R)

Majority leadership

- Majority Leader: Theresa Gavarone (R)
- Majority Whip: George Lang (R)

Minority leadership

- Minority Leader: Nickie Antonio (D)
- Assistant Minority Leader: Hearcel Craig (D)
- Minority Whip: Kent Smith (D)
- Assistant Minority Whip: Beth Liston (D)

==== House of Representatives ====
- Speaker of the House: Matt Huffman (R)
- Speaker Pro Tempore: Gayle Manning (R)

Majority leadership

- Majority Leader: Marilyn John (R)
- Assistant Majority Leader: Adam Bird (R)
- Majority Whips: Riordan McClain, Steve Demetriou, Nick Santucci, and Josh Williams (R)

Minority leadership

- Minority Leader: Dani Isaacsohn (D)
- Assistant Minority Leader: Phil Robinson (D)
- Minority Whip: Beryl Piccolantonio (D)
- Assistant Minority Whip: Desiree Tims (D)

=== United States senators ===
1. Bernie Moreno (R)
2. Jon Husted (R)

=== United States representatives ===
- 1st district: Greg Landsman (D)
- 2nd district: David Taylor (R)
- 3rd district: Joyce Beatty (D)
- 4th district: Jim Jordan (R)
- 5th district: Bob Latta (R)
- 6th district: Michael Rulli (R)
- 7th district: Max Miller (R)
- 8th district: Warren Davidson (R)
- 9th district: Marcy Kaptur (D)
- 10th district: Mike Turner (R)
- 11th district: Shontel Brown (D)
- 12th district: Troy Balderson (R)
- 13th district: Emilia Sykes (D)
- 14th district: David Joyce (R)
- 15th district: Mike Carey (R)

== Candidates for state office ==
- Ohio gubernatorial elections
- List of Ohio lieutenant gubernatorial elections
- Ohio Attorney General elections
- Ohio State Auditor elections
- Ohio Secretary of State elections
- Ohio State Treasurer elections
- Ohio Supreme Court elections

== Candidates for federal office ==
=== U.S. Senate ===
- List of United States Senate elections in Ohio

=== U.S. House of Representatives ===
- 1st district election results
- 2nd district election results
- 3rd district election results
- 4th district election results
- 5th district election results
- 6th district election results
- 7th district election results
- 8th district election results
- 9th district election results
- 10th district election results
- 11th district election results
- 12th district election results
- 13th district election results
- 14th district election results
- 15th district election results
- 16th district election results (to 2020)
- 17th district election results (to 2010)
- 18th district election results (to 2010)
- 19th district election results (to 2000)
- 20th district election results (to 1990)
- 21st district election results (to 1990)
- 22nd district election results (to 1980)
- 23rd district election results (1952–1980)
- 24th district election results (1966–1970)
- At-large district election results (1932–1950 and 1962–1964)

== See also ==
- List of governors of Ohio
  - List of current United States governors
- List of lieutenant governors of Ohio
- List of United States senators from Ohio
  - List of current United States senators
- List of United States representatives from Ohio
  - List of current United States representatives
- Ohio's congressional delegations
- Supreme Court of Ohio
  - List of justices of the Supreme Court of Ohio
- Ohio General Assembly
  - Ohio Senate
  - Ohio House of Representatives
- List of Ohio politicians by federal office
- List of Ohio politicians by state office
