= Martha Kinney Cooper =

First Lady of Ohio from 1929 to 1931

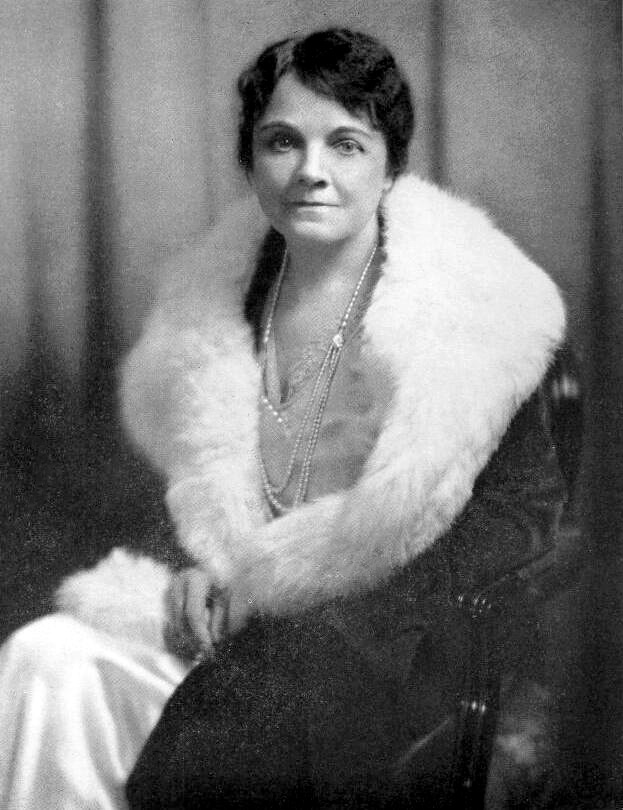
- Born: Martha Norma Kinney; January 12, 1874; Cincinnati, Ohio, U.S.
- Died: April 20, 1964 (aged 90)
- Known for: Founding the Martha Kinney Cooper Ohioana Library
- Spouse: Myers Y. Cooper (m. 1897)
- Children: 2
- Honors: Ohio Women's Hall of Fame

Martha Norma Kinney Cooper (née Kinney; January 12, 1874 – April 20, 1964) was the First Lady of Ohio. After her husband Myers Y. Cooper was elected governor of Ohio in 1929, Kinney Cooper decided to create a library housing the works of Ohioans.

== Personal life ==
Kinney Cooper was born to parents Joel and Sarah Kinney on January 12, 1874. Her father was a former Major during the Civil War and worked as a lawyer. Growing up, Kinney Cooper attended Walnut Hills Christian Church where she met her future husband, Myers Y. Cooper. She graduated from Woodward High School in 1892. She married Cooper on December 15, 1897, and they had two children together; Raymond K. Cooper and Martha Anne Cooper.

== Career ==
In early 1929, she moved into the governor's mansion with her husband. As she was unpacking, Kinney Cooper came across stacks of books and large bookshelves but realized that none of them were written by Ohio authors. This inspired her to establish the Ohioana Library Association, an organization with the goal to preserve Ohio's cultural heritage. Directed by Depew Head, the Martha Kinney Cooper Ohioana Library was created to specifically house the works of Ohioans. Kinney Cooper established relationships with various authors and interests groups to expand the library. Each spring, she would host a tea for Hamilton County authors at her Cincinnati home. She also developed a friendship with members of the National League of American Pen Women. One such member, Clara Heflebower, would go on to serve as secretary of the Ohioana Library committee.

By the 1931, the library already held more than 600 volumes. As a non-profit, all the books were collected through the authors themselves. Ohio was the first state to found a library of the works of its own authors. She continued to enlist help from interest groups, such as the Ohio Federation of Women's Clubs, to help her collect and file books written by Ohioans. As a result, the library outgrew its space in the governor's mansion and was relocated to the State Library of Ohio. By January 2001, the library again relocated, this time to 274 E First Avenue. In 1942, the Ohioana Book Awards was established to honor Ohio authors in Fiction, Nonfiction, Poetry, and Juvenile Literature.

Kinney Cooper remained active with the library until her death in 1964. On August 30, 1978, Kinney Cooper was posthumously inducted into the Ohio Women's Hall of Fame.
