= Joseph H. Himes =

American politician

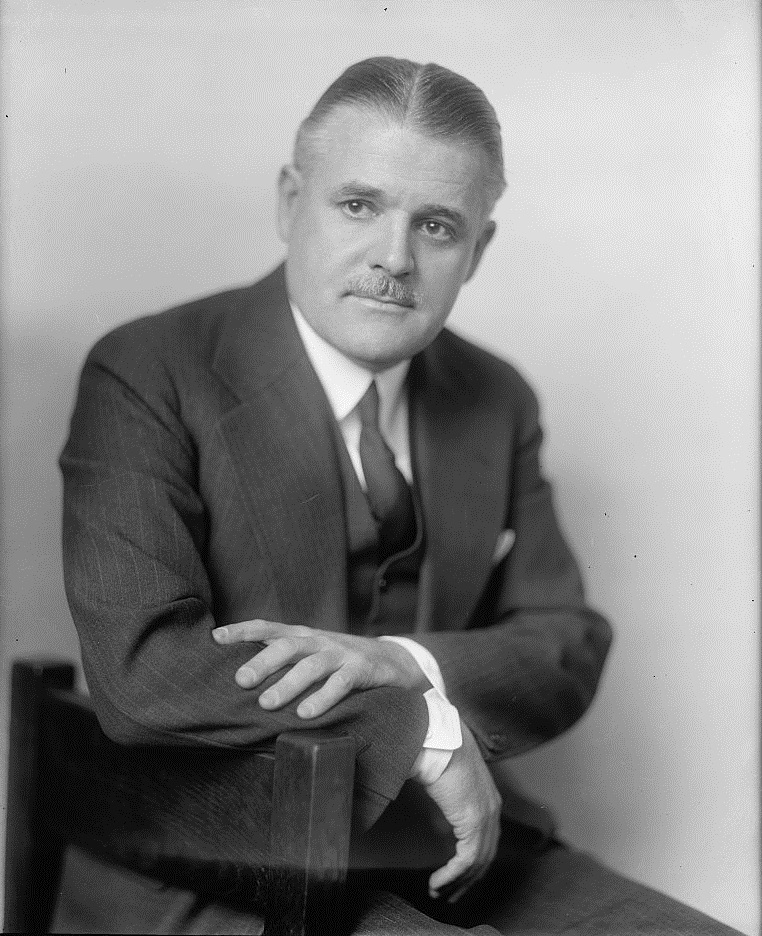

Member of the U.S. House of Representatives from Ohio's 16th district
- In office March 4, 1921 – March 3, 1923
- Preceded by: Roscoe C. McCulloch
- Succeeded by: John McSweeney

Personal details
- Born: Joseph Hendrix Himes; August 15, 1885 New Oxford, Pennsylvania, U.S.
- Died: September 9, 1960 (aged 75) Washington, D.C., U.S.
- Resting place: Fort Lincoln Cemetery
- Party: Republican
- Education: Gettysburg College; Penn State

Joseph Hendrix Himes (August 15, 1885 – September 9, 1960) was an American politician and one-term U.S. representative from Ohio from 1921 to 1923.

== Life and career ==
Born in New Oxford, Pennsylvania, Himes attended the public schools, Gettysburg College, and Pennsylvania State College. He was employed in the steel industry and later engaged as banker.

=== Congress ===
Himes was elected as a Republican to the Sixty-seventh Congress (March 4, 1921 – March 3, 1923). He was an unsuccessful candidate in 1922 for reelection to the Sixty-eighth Congress.

=== Later life ===
He then moved to Frederick, MD in 1925 and took possession of the mansion known as Prospect Hall (Frederick, Maryland) where he lived with his family until 1958, entertaining and hosting dignitaries and US Presidents like Franklin Delano Roosevelt en route to Shangri-La, later dubbed Camp David.

Himes was the founder, president, and chairman of the board of directors of Group Hospitalization, Inc., Washington, D.C. He engaged in various business interests in Washington, New York City, and elsewhere.

=== Death and burial ===
He died in Washington, D.C., on September 9, 1960, and was interred in Fort Lincoln Cemetery.

== Sources ==
- United States Congress. "Joseph H. Himes (id: H000626)". Biographical Directory of the United States Congress.

U.S. House of Representatives
Preceded by Roscoe C. McCulloch	Member of the U.S. House of Representatives from Ohio's 16th congressional district 1921-1923	Succeeded by John McSweeney
