= Monroe Bank =

- U.S. National Register of Historic Places
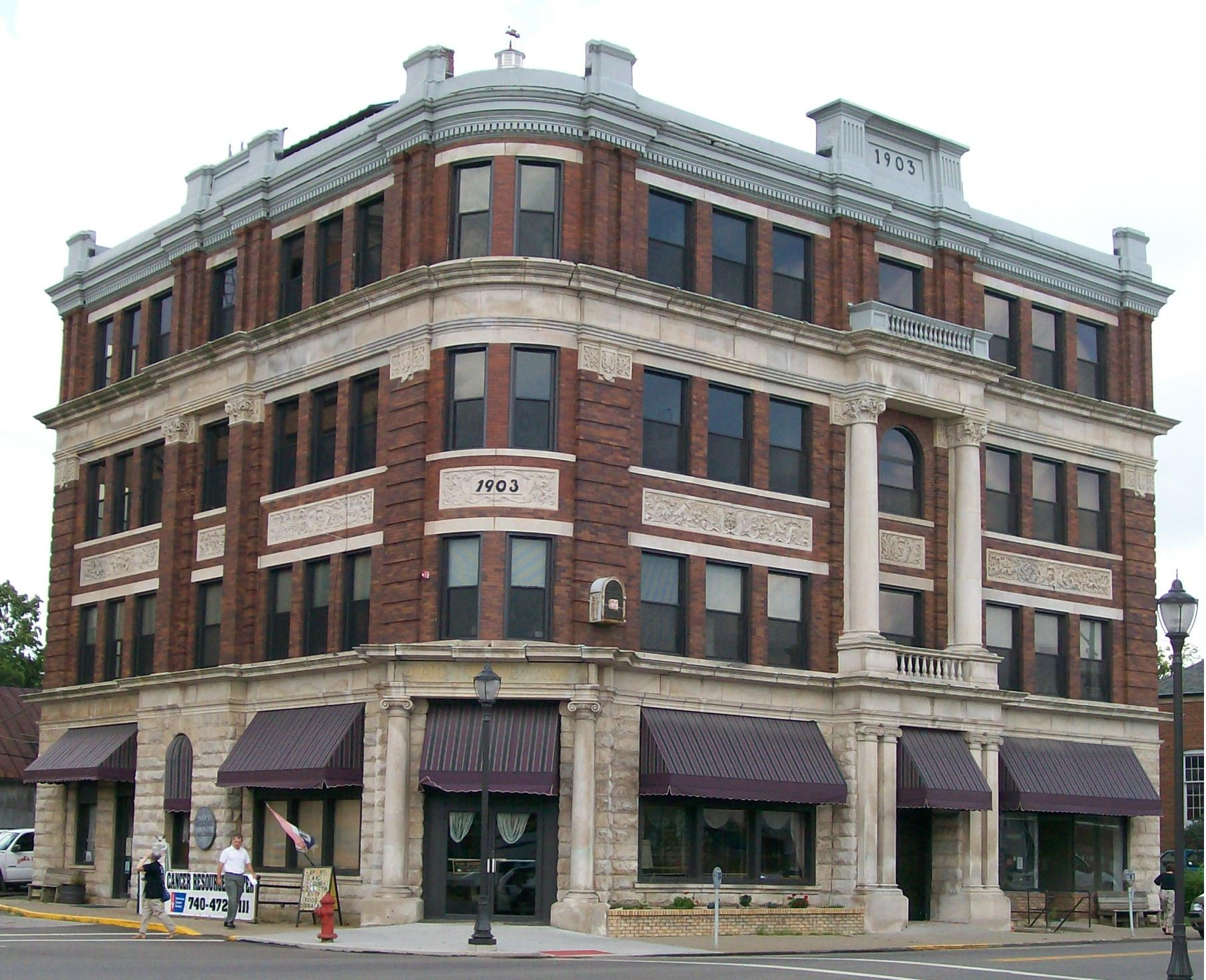
- Monroe Bank in 2009

- Location within Ohio Location within the United States
- Location: 117 Main St., Woodsfield, Ohio
- Coordinates: 39°45′47″N 81°6′57″W
- Area: less than one acre
- Built: 1903
- NRHP reference No.: 80003167
- Added to NRHP: March 11, 1980

The Monroe Bank building is located at 117 Main Street in Woodsfield, Ohio. The building was placed on the National Register of Historic Places on March 11, 1980.

== History ==
The building was built in 1903 and was the headquarters for Monroe County Bank. The bank was chartered 1874 by Colonel Samuel L. Mooney, with an initial capital of $50,000. For years it was the only bank in Monroe County. The fine crafted interior gave a glimpse of the bank's wealth to its clients.

The bank acted as the main office for the O.R.&W. Railway from 1905 until it was purchased and moved out of state in 1917.

When Samuel Mooney died in 1916, his son William C. Mooney took over as President of the bank, but he died in 1918, leaving the Presidency open. J.D. Mooney took over as president and remained in that post for the remainder of the bank's operation. The bank remained one of the prominent business of Monroe County and seemed to weather the first years of the Great Depression well, until 1931, when the bank was forced to close all of its branch locations, leaving just the location in Woodsfield open. However, the financial situation did not improve and was forced to close its doors 1933. The liquidation of the bank was a long and arduous one and lasted for years.

The bank housed various offices, including a few of the county officials, and even served as an apartment building. The bank is currently owned by Gary Rubel, who has renovated the bank back to its former glory and has rented out many of the offices inside.

== Building Appearance ==
The building was constructed of rusticated stone blocks with the upper floors built with red brick on a primarily square footprint. The four-story building contains three entrances on the ground floor, two on the main facades and the third on a flattened corner. The entrances on the south facade are surrounded by Ionic columns, the entrance on the corner has a panel above the second floor windows reading "1903", with decorative scrollwork stone panels separating the second and third floors. Above the entrance on the south facade rises two large Corinthian columns with balconies and a balustrade panel bearing "1903" on the panel. This piece is part of what was once a complete balustrade running along the roofline.

In 2006 construction began on an observation deck giving panoramic views of Woodsfield. The octagonal room is lined with long windows and topped by a roof rising to a weathervane in the shape of a locomotive.
