= List of ambassadors of the United States from Ohio =

Name	Life dates	Party	Ambassadorship(s) with dates
James E. Akins			1973-1975: Ambassador to Saudi Arabia
Horace N. Allen			1897-1905: Ambassador to Korea
Thomas H. Anderson			1889-1892: Ambassador to Bolivia
John A. Bingham			1873-1885: Ambassador to Japan
Paul H. Boeker	1938-2003		1977-1980: Ambassador to Bolivia; 1984-1987: Ambassador to Jordan
Davis Eugene Boster			1974-1976: Ambassador to Bangladesh; 1976-1979: Ambassador to Guatemala
Thomas D. Boyatt			1978-1980: Ambassador to Burkina Faso; 1980-1983: Ambassador to Colombia
Ethan Allen Brown	1776-1852	Democratic	1830-1834: Ambassador to Brazil
John A. Bryan			1844-1845: Ambassador to Peru
Charles R. Burrows			1960-1965: Ambassador to Honduras
Patricia M. Byrne			1976-1979: Ambassador to Mali; 1979-1983: Ambassador to Burma
John W. Caldwell			1868-1869: Ambassador to Bolivia
Lewis D. Campbell			1866: Sworn in as ambassador to Mexico, but did not serve
David K. Cartter			1861-1862: Ambassador to Bolivia
Richard F. "Dick" Celeste	1937-	Democratic	1997-2001: Ambassador to India
William T. Coggeshall	1824-1867		1866-1867: Ambassador to Ecuador
James M. Comly	1832-1887		1877-1882: Ambassador to Hawaii
James Cooley			1826-1828: Ambassador to Peru
Frank P. Corrigan			1934-1937: Ambassador to El Salvador; 1937-1939: Ambassador to Panama; 1939-1947: Ambassador to Venezuela
Robert Foster Corrigan			1971-1973: Ambassador to Rwanda
Thomas Corwin	1794-1865	Whig	1861-1864: Ambassador to Mexico
Joseph E. Denning			1922-1924: Ambassador to Mongolia
John E. Dolibois			1981-1985: Ambassador to Luxembourg
Edwin Dun			1893-1897: Ambassador to Japan
John Arthur Ferch			1985-1986: Ambassador to Honduras
George H. Flood			1840-1841: Ambassador to Texas
Joseph C. Green			1952-1953: Ambassador to Jordan,
Fred L. Hadsel			1971-1974: Ambassador to Ghana
John Hamm			1831-1833: Ambassador to Chile
Holsey G. Handyside			1975-1977: Ambassador to Mauritania
Matthew E. Hanna			1929-1933: Ambassador to Nicaragua; 1933-1936: Ambassador to Guatemala
William Henry Harrison	1773-1841	Republican	1828-1829: Ambassador to Colombia
Frederick Hassaurek			1861-1866: Ambassador to Ecuador
Myron T. Herrick	1854-1929	Republican	1912-1914, 1921-1929: Ambassador to France
J. Morton Howell			1921-1927: Ambassador to Egypt
J. Klahr Huddle			1947-1949: Ambassador to Burma
Joseph J. Johnson			1918-1922: Ambassador to Liberia
Harmon Elwood Kirby			1990-1994: Ambassador to Togo
Robert C. Kirk			1862-1866: Ambassador to Argentina; 1869-1871: Ambassador to Argentina and Uruguay
Paul Knabenshue			1932-1942: Ambassador to Iraq
Foy D. Kohler			1962-1966: Ambassador to Russia
Joseph Saul Kornfeld			1921-1924: Ambassador to Iran (Persia)
Edward S. Little			1974-1976: Ambassador to Chad
Jesse D. Locker	1891-1955	Republican	1953-1955: Ambassador to Liberia
Francis B. Loomis			1897-1901: Ambassador to Venezuela; 1901-1902: Ambassador to Portugal
Stephen Low			1976-1979: Ambassador to Zambia; 1979-1981: Ambassador to Nigeria
Leopold Markbreit			1869-1873: Ambassador to Bolivia
Edwin M. Martin			1964-1968: Ambassador to Argentina
Edward E. Masters			1976-1977: Ambassador to Bangladesh; 1977-1981: Ambassador to Indonesia
Donald J. McConnell			1993-1996: Ambassador to Burkina Faso
Tom McDonald			1997–present: Ambassador to Zimbabwe
Roger A. McGuire			1992-1995: Ambassador to Guinea-Bissau
Samuel Medary	1801-1864	Democratic	1853: Sworn in as ambassador to Chile, but did not serve
Lloyd I. Miller			1973-1975: Ambassador to Trinidad and Tobago
Daniel F. Mooney			1914-1921: Ambassador to Paraguay
George W. Morgan			1858-1861: Ambassador to Portugal
William S. Murphy			1843-1844: Ambassador to Texas
Wallace Murray			1935-1936: Ambassador to Iran
Edwin L. Neville			1937-1940: Ambassador to Thailand
Raymond Henry Norweb			1936-1937: Ambassador to Bolivia; 1937-1940: Ambassador to the Dominican Republic; 1940-1943: Ambassador to Peru; 1943-1945: Ambassador to Portugal; 1945-1948: Ambassador to Cuba
Edward F. Noyes	1832-1890	Republican	1877-1881: Ambassador to France
Jefferson Patterson			1956-1958: Ambassador to Uruguay
H. E. Peck			1865-1867: Ambassador to Haiti
George H. Pendleton	1825-1889	Democratic	1885-1889: Ambassador to Germany
Charles J. Pilliod, Jr.			1986-1989: Ambassador to Mexico
William S. Rosecrans	1819-1898	Republican	1868-1869: Ambassador to Mexico
Charles W. Sawyer			1944-1945: Ambassador to Belgium and Luxembourg
William B. Saxbe	1916-	Republican	1975-1976: Ambassador to India
William E. Schaufele Jr.			1969-1971: Ambassador to Burkina Faso; 1978-1980: Ambassador to Poland
Robert C. Schenck			1851-1853: Ambassador to Brazil; 1870-1876: Ambassador to the United Kingdom
John Seys			1866-1870: Ambassador to Liberia
Wilson Shannon	1802-1877	Democratic	1844-1845: Ambassador to Mexico
William G. Sharp			1914-1919: Ambassador to France
Samuel Shellabarger I			1869-1870: Ambassador to Portugal
Daniel Howard Simpson			1989-1992: Ambassador to the Central African Republic; 1995–present: Ambassador to Congo (Kinshasa)
Robert Peet Skinner			1931-1933: Ambassador to Estonia, Latvia, and Lithuania; 1926-1932: Ambassador to Greece; 1933-1936: Ambassador to Turkey
Carroll Sprigg			1920-1921: Ambassador to Egypt
John B. Stallo			1885-1889: Ambassador to Italy
David A. Starkweather			1854-1847: Ambassador to Chile
Carl B. Stokes	1927-1996	Democratic	1994-1995: Ambassador to the Seychelles
Bellamy Storer			1899-1902: Ambassador to Spain; 1902-1906: Ambassador to Austria; 1897-1899: Ambassador to Belgium
Peter J. Sullivan			1867-1869: Ambassador to Colombia
Alphonso Taft	1810-1891	Republican	1882-1884: Ambassador to Austria; 1884-1885: Ambassador to Russia
Richard W. Teare			1993-1996: Ambassador to Papua New Guinea, the Solomon Islands, and Vanuatu
David Tod	1805-1868	Republican	1847-1851: Ambassador to Brazil
Timothy Lathrop Towell			1988-1991: Ambassador to Paraguay
Sandra Louise Vogelgesang			1994-1997: Ambassador to Nepal
Marvin L. Warner			1977-1979: Ambassador to Switzerland
Brand Whitlock			1913-1914: Envoy to Belgium; 1919-1921: Ambassador to Belgium
John N. Willys			1930-1932: Ambassador to Poland
Milton A. Wolf			1977-1980: Ambassador to Austria
Jonathan F. Woodside			1835-1841: Ambassador to Denmark
