= George White (Ohio politician) =

52nd governor of Ohio

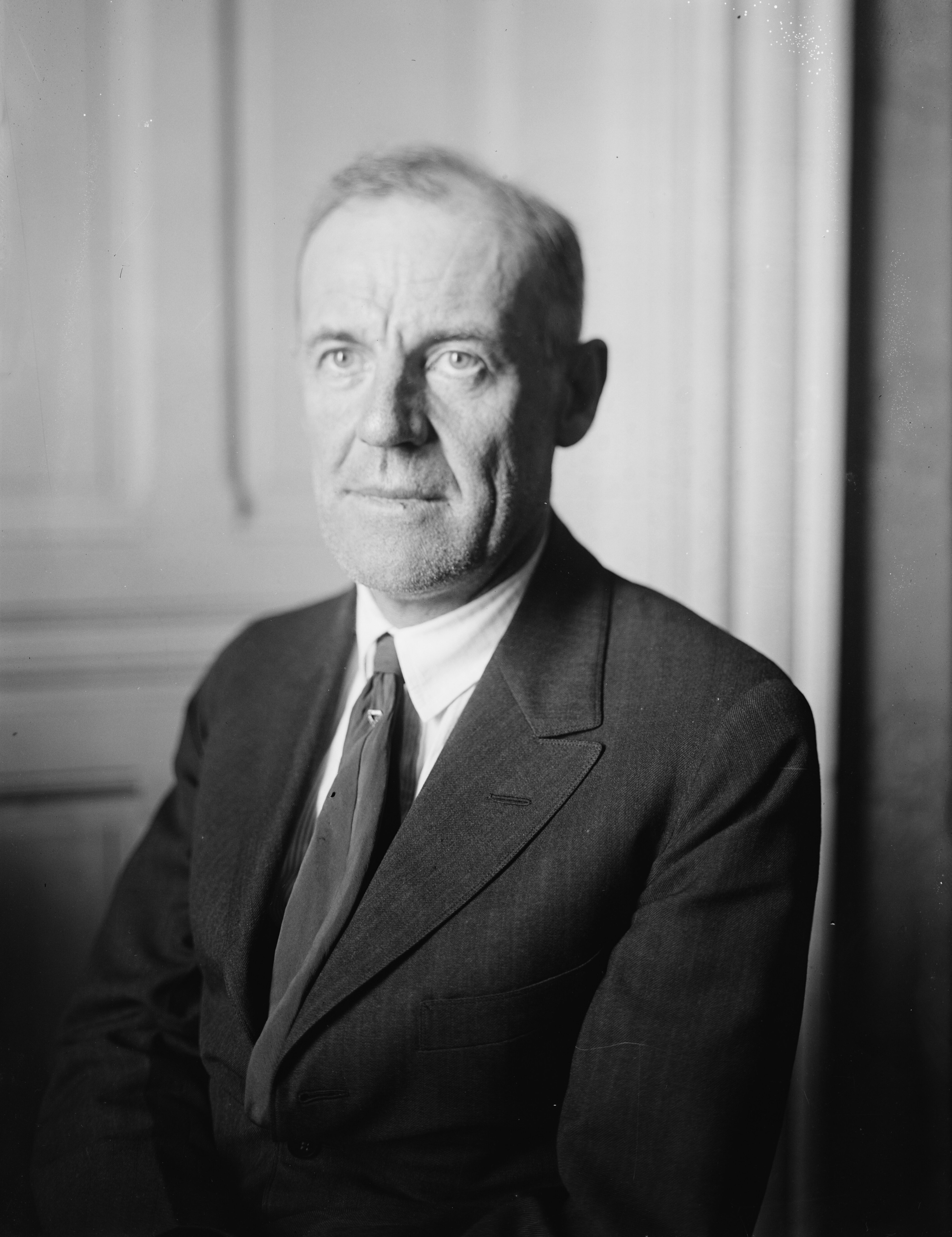
- White c. 1915–1920

52nd Governor of Ohio
- In office January 12, 1931 – January 14, 1935
- Lieutenant: William G. Pickrel; Charles W. Sawyer
- Preceded by: Myers Y. Cooper
- Succeeded by: Martin L. Davey

Member of the U.S. House of Representatives from Ohio's 15th district
- In office March 4, 1911 – March 3, 1915
- Preceded by: James Joyce
- Succeeded by: William C. Mooney
- In office March 4, 1917 – March 3, 1919
- Preceded by: William C. Mooney
- Succeeded by: C. Ellis Moore

Personal details
- Born: August 21, 1872 Elmira, New York, U.S.
- Died: December 15, 1953 (aged 81) West Palm Beach, Florida, U.S.
- Resting place: Oak Grove Cemetery in Marietta, Ohio
- Party: Democratic
- Spouse: Charlotte McKelvy
- Children: 5
- Education: Princeton College

George White (August 21, 1872 – December 15, 1953) was an American Democratic Party politician who served as a U.S. Representative and as the 52nd governor of Ohio.

== Early life and education ==
George White was born on August 21, 1872, in Elmira, New York. He was the son of Charles W. and Mary S. (Back) White. He attended Princeton College in Princeton, New Jersey.

== Career ==
After mining in the Klondike, Yukon, he settled in Marietta, Ohio, to drill for oil.

=== Politics ===
After serving in the Ohio House of Representatives from 1905 to 1908, White was elected to the U.S. House of Representatives in 1910, serving from 1911 to 1915. White lost a re-election bid in 1914, but won election again in 1916 before his defeat in the 1918 election.

White served as Chairman of the Democratic National Committee from 1920 to 1921, additionally managing James M. Cox's presidential campaign in 1920.

He then returned to politics again in 1930, serving two two-year terms as governor from 1931 to 1935. He was an unsuccessful candidate for the U.S. Senate in 1934. In 1940, White ran again for the Democratic nomination for governor but lost to Martin L. Davey.

In 1936, White was influential in securing the agreement of sculptor Gutzon Borglum to create the National Start Westward Memorial of The United States,, which was completed in 1938.

== Personal life ==
He married Charlotte McKelvy of Titusville, Pennsylvania, on September 25, 1900, and had five children.

=== Death and burial ===
He died at West Palm Beach, Florida, December 15, 1953, and is buried at Oak Grove Cemetery in Marietta.

== See also ==
- Ohio gubernatorial elections

Political offices
Preceded by Myers Y. Cooper	Governor of Ohio; 1931–1935	Succeeded by Martin L. Davey
Party political offices
Preceded by Martin L. Davey	Democratic nominee for Governor of Ohio; 1930, 1932	Succeeded by Martin L. Davey
Ohio House of Representatives
Preceded by Harvey E. Smith	Representative from Washington County; January 1, 1906-January 3, 1909	Succeeded by John D. Hollinger
