= Joseph Sharts =

American writer (1875–1965)

Sharts as he appeared in December 1924 at a meeting of the National Executive Committee of the Socialist Party.

Joseph William Sharts (September 14, 1875 – May 15, 1965) was an American political operative, newspaper editor, and novelist. Sharts is best remembered as a novelist of the first two decades of the 20th century and as a defense attorney in a number of high-profile political trials, including cases involving Socialist Party of America leader Eugene V. Debs, future Workers (Communist) Party leader C. E. Ruthenberg, and radical clergyman William Montgomery Brown.

Sharts was a top leader of the Socialist Party of America, sitting on that group's governing National Executive Committee from 1925 to 1932. He unsuccessfully ran three times as the Socialist candidate for Governor of Ohio.

== Biography ==
=== Early years ===
Joseph Sharts was born September 14, 1875, in Hamilton, Ohio. He was the son of an attorney who moved the family to the small city of Dayton, Ohio, when Joseph was just a boy. It was in Dayton that Sharts attended public school, graduating from high school there.

After graduation Sharts enrolled at Harvard College, from which he graduated in 1897.

=== Novelist ===
Pictorial title page of Sharts's 1902 novel, The Romance of a Rogue.

Sharts gained some note as the writer of popular fiction, publishing his first book, Ezra Caine, in 1900. Sharts published six novels in all between 1900 and 1913, these being essentially works of light romantic fiction in which protagonists battled obstacles to their realization of true love en route to inevitable happy endings.

Sharts's literary work was lauded by critics for high competence in execution, although criticized for lacking imagination with respect to plot.

=== Attorney ===
A graduate of Harvard Law School, Sharts was an attorney who participated in a number of important political cases during the late 1910s and the decade of the 1920s. During World War I he defended a number of individuals tried for various violations of the Espionage Act, including most prominently a position on the defense team of Socialist Party icon Eugene V. Debs. He had earlier headed the defense of future Communist Party leaders C. E. Ruthenberg, Alfred Wagenknecht, and Charles Baker, charged with violation of the Espionage Act in Ohio in 1917.

Although not himself a Communist, Sharts did not hesitate to represent Communists in legal proceedings, including a 1920 case filed by the Communist Labor Party of America against the American Legion for damages suffered during a mob action against one of their offices.

=== Socialist activist ===
Front page of Sharts's 1919 "Open Letter to You, President Wilson," a 4-page leaflet of the Workers Defense Union.

During the early 1920s Sharts was the publisher and editor of The Miami Valley Socialist, a weekly newspaper which covered contemporary political news and promulgated the ideas of the Socialist Party of America (SPA). In this role he was instrumental in rebuilding the Socialist Party of Ohio, which had been shattered and nearly obliterated in the 1919 split of the left wing to form new Communist political organizations.

Sharts was a member of the governing National Executive Committee of the national Socialist Party from 1925 to 1932, having held a similar post on the short-lived Conference for Progressive Political Action (CPPA), an exploratory group for a potential labor party which existed from 1922 to 1925.

Sharts was a candidate for Ohio Attorney General in 1920. He would later run for Governor of Ohio three times, heading the SPA's ticket in the state in 1926, 1928, and again in 1932. Sharts's best showing was in his final gubernatorial race, when he was the recipient of slightly more than 1.25% of total votes cast.

In 1924 Sharts played a leading role in the trial of defrocked Episcopal bishop William Montgomery Brown, a Communist Party supporter from Massillon, Ohio, in his trial for heresy.

Sharts was a popular figure within Socialist Party ranks and was among those considered for nomination for President of the United States at the SPA's 1928 convention in New York City.

=== Later years ===
Sharts was a freemason and was a member of the United Spanish War Veterans.

=== Death and legacy ===
Joseph Sharts died May 15, 1965, in Dayton, Ohio. He was 89 years old at the time of his death.

His estate was probated in Dayton. His will specified that his estate be divided among the descendants of his great, great-grandparents (sixteen people). The executor was unable to identify all of those ancestors, and was unable to identify all of the identified ancestors' descendants before the probate case was closed due to lack of time and funding.The executor estimated the number of living descendants of merely one great, great-grandparent --- Jonathan Minshall --- to be in "the hundreds, if not thousands."

== Works ==
- Ezra Caine. Chicago: Herbert S. Stone and Co., 1900.
- The Romance of a Rogue. Chicago: Herbert S. Stone and Co., 1902.
- The Hills of Freedom. Doubleday, Page & Co., 1904.
- The Black Sheep. New York: Duffield and Co., 1909.
- The Vintage. New York: Duffield and Co., 1911. —Title in Great Britain: The Red Vintage.
- The King Who Came: A Tale of the Great Revolt. New York: Duffield and Co., 1913.
- Guilty? Of What? Speeches Before the Jury in Connection with the Trial of C.E. Ruthenberg, Alfred Wagenknecht, Charles Baker. With C.E. Ruthenberg, Alfred Wagenknecht, and Charles Baker. Cleveland, OH: Local Cleveland, Socialist Party, n.d. [1917].
- An Open Letter to You, President Wilson. New York: Workers Defense Union, 1919.
- "Left Wingers Capture the Ohio Socialist Convention: Resolve to Rule or Wreck National Party — 'Communist Party' to Be Formed," Miami Valley Socialist [Dayton, OH], v. 7, whole no. 382 (July 4, 1919), pg. 1.
- Biography of Dayton: An Economic Interpretation of Local History. Dayton, OH: Miami Valley Socialist, 1922.
- "The 'Workers' Party," New York Call, vol. 15, no. 3 (Jan. 3, 1922), pg. 7.
- Bishop Brown's Case: A Speech by Joseph W. Sharts, Attorney at Law, Dayton, Ohio. New York : Morris R. Lukens, 1925.
- Pure Milk and the Future of the Dairy Industry: Address by Mr. Joseph W. Sharts, March 8, 1929, Hotel Sherman, Chicago, Illinois. Chicago: American Medical Liberty League, 1929.
