= Myers Y. Cooper =

American politician (1873–1958)

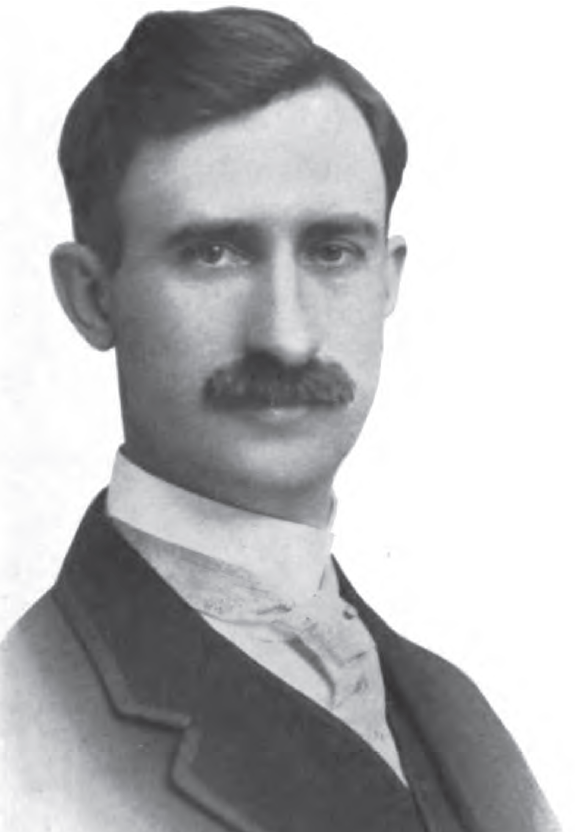

51st Governor of Ohio
- In office January 14, 1929 – January 12, 1931
- Lieutenant: John T. Brown
- Preceded by: A. Victor Donahey
- Succeeded by: George White

Personal details
- Born: November 25, 1873 St. Louisville, Ohio, U.S.
- Died: December 6, 1958 (aged 85) Hyde Park, Cincinnati, Ohio, U.S.
- Resting place: Spring Grove Cemetery
- Party: Republican
- Spouse: Martha Kinney (m. 1897)
- Children: 2
- Education: National Normal University

Myers Young Cooper (November 25, 1873 – December 6, 1958) was an American Republican politician and businessman from Ohio. Cooper was the 51st governor of Ohio.

Born In St. Louisville, Ohio, the youngest of eleven children, Cooper had a public school education, and attended the National Normal University in Lebanon, Ohio for three years. In 1893, at age 20, he joined his brothers in Cincinnati in a large real-estate and homebuilding business. On December 15, 1897, he married Martha Kinney. His business interests also included lumber, building supplies and banking. After losing in 1926, he won election to the governorship in 1928, serving from 1929 to 1931. His January 14, 1929, inauguration ceremony in Columbus was live broadcast by Ohio School of the Air, simulcast via Ohio State University's radio station WEAO and Cincinnati's WLW.

The defining feature of his term was the beginning of the Great Depression in October 1929, which was exacerbated by a drought the following summer that pummeled the Ohio farm economy. Cooper largely echoed the Hoover Administration's calls for calm and efforts to speed up previously-planned public works spending which represented the conventional view of how to respond to sudden downturns. Local committees were created to aid in finding jobs of the unemployed but this effort largely proved ineffective as the crisis intensified.

Cooper was nominated without opposition in 1930, but lost to George White. Cooper's tepid response to the developing Great Depression led to a collapse in voter turnout - about 20 percent fewer votes were cast compared with the 1928 election. White won despite winning fewer votes than Democratic candidate Martin Davey collected two years previously. Cooper unsuccessfully sought the Republican nomination for governor again in 1932, his last bid for office.

In 1929 Cooper signed a one-cent increase in the state gas tax which was estimated to produce $8.5 million in additional funds for road and bridge work. His administration also authorized the start of construction on the State Office Building to house agencies scattered in rented space around Columbus. The building on Front Street is now home to the Ohio Supreme Court. Cooper also faced a major crisis when a fire at the Ohio Penitentiary on April 21, 1930 killed 322 inmates. The fire led to legislative efforts to ease overcrowding and the establishment of a state parole board.

In mid-to-late 1920s, Cooper was associated with South Florida real estate developer and politician George E. Merrick. Cooper was involved with Merrick's Village Project developments in Coral Gables, Florida that would later impact and inspire the architecture of Cincinnati homes in the 1930s-50s.

His former home is now the grounds for Clark Montessori High School.

Cooper Arena at the Ohio Expo Center and State Fairgrounds in Columbus, Ohio, was named in honor of Cooper.

Party political offices
Preceded by Harry L. Davis	Republican Party nominee for Governor of Ohio; 1926, 1928, 1930	Succeeded by David S. Ingalls
