= Robert J. Bulkley =

American politician (1880–1965)

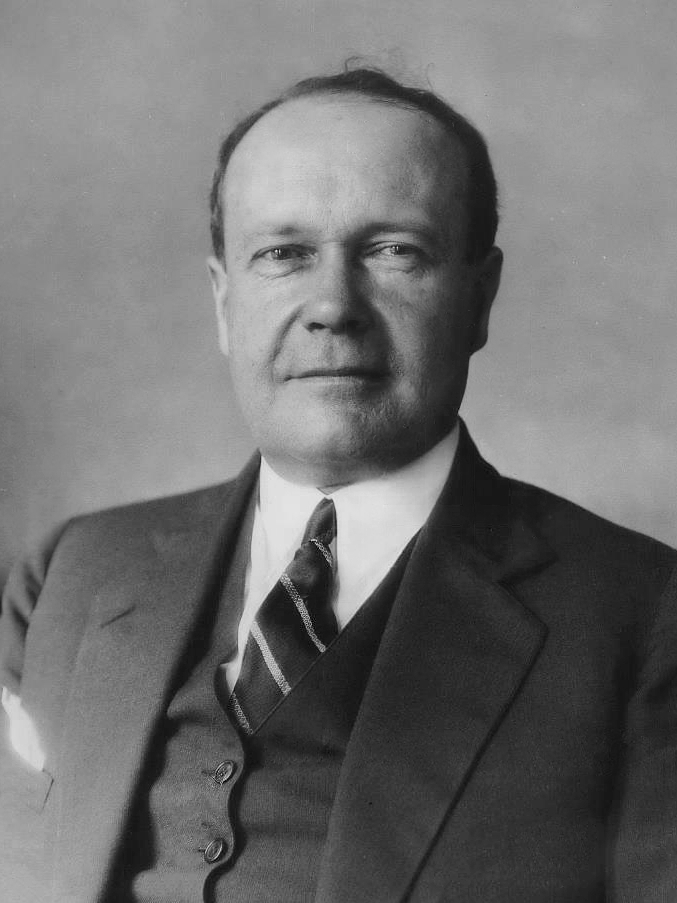
- Bulkley in 1930

United States Senator from Ohio
- In office December 1, 1930 – January 3, 1939
- Preceded by: Roscoe C. McCulloch
- Succeeded by: Robert A. Taft

Member of the U.S. House of Representatives from Ohio's 21st district
- In office March 4, 1911 – March 3, 1915
- Preceded by: James H. Cassidy
- Succeeded by: Robert Crosser

Personal details
- Born: Robert Johns Bulkley; October 8, 1880 Cleveland, Ohio, U.S.
- Died: July 21, 1965 (aged 84) Cleveland, Ohio, U.S.
- Resting place: Lake View Cemetery
- Party: Democratic
- Spouses: Katherine Pope (m. 1909; died 1932); Helen Robbins (m. 1934)
- Education: Harvard University

Robert Johns Bulkley (October 8, 1880 – July 21, 1965) was an American attorney and politician from Ohio. A Democrat, he served in the United States House of Representatives, and in the United States Senate from 1930 until 1939.

== Life and career ==
Bulkley was born to a wealthy family in Cleveland, Ohio in 1880. He attended the private University School before graduating from Harvard College and law school. He commenced the practice of law in Cleveland, Ohio in 1906. Bulkley served two terms in the House from 1911-1915 from the 21st District on Cleveland's East Side. During World War I, he served as chief of the legal section of the War Industries Board. He was later elected to the U.S. Senate in 1930 to fill the vacancy created by the death of Theodore E. Burton. Bulkley was re-elected in 1932, yet he lost a bid for a second full term in 1938 to Robert A. Taft. After his term in the Senate ended, he resumed his practice of law.

While a member of the House of Representatives, Bulkley became an expert on banking. He helped frame the Federal Reserve Act of 1913 and the Federal Farm Loan Act, which would not pass until 1916.

Bulkley knew Franklin D. Roosevelt from their college days when they worked together on the Harvard Crimson student newspaper. Senator Bulkley praised President Roosevelt and most of the New Deal, and he doled out a great deal of federal patronage. He was a moderate: midway between the liberals and the conservatives. He voted against key New Deal laws such the National Industrial Recovery Act, Tennessee Valley Authority, Agricultural Adjustment Act, Works Progress Administration, soil conservation, and against the wages and hours legislation. Nevertheless, when Roosevelt was trying to purge the Democratic conservatives in 1938, he went to Ohio to praise and endorse Bulkley. The decisive factor for Roosevelt was that Bulkey had voted YEA on the two critical 1937 bills for court-packing and for executive reorganization.

The Bulkley Building located in Playhouse Square in downtown Cleveland, Ohio is named after him.

Bulkley was married February 17, 1909 to Katherine Pope of Helena, Montana.

== Electoral history ==
Ohio 1938 Senate Election
Party	Candidate	Votes	%
Republican	Robert A. Taft	1,255,414	53.62%
Democratic	Robert J. Bulkley (Incumbent)	1,085,792	46.38%
Majority		169,622	7.24%
Turnout		2,341,206	
Republican gain from Democratic			

Ohio 1932 Senate Election
Party	Candidate	Votes	%
Democratic	Robert J. Bulkley (Incumbent)	1,293,175	52.53%
Republican	Gilbert Bettman	1,126,832	45.77%
Prohibition	Frank M. Mecartney	34,760	1.41%
Communist	I. O. Ford	7,227	0.29%
Majority		166,343	6.76%
Turnout		2,461,994	
Democratic hold			

United States Senate special election in Ohio, 1930
Party	Candidate	Votes	%
Democratic	Robert J. Bulkley	1,046,561	54.78%
Republican	Roscoe C. McCulloch	863,944	45.22%
Majority		182,617	9.56%
Turnout		1,910,505	
Democratic gain from Republican			

Party political offices
Preceded by Graham P. Hunt	Democratic nominee for U.S. Senator from Ohio (Class 3); 1930, 1932, 1938	Succeeded by William G. Pickrel
U.S. House of Representatives
Preceded by James H. Cassidy	Member of the U.S. House of Representatives from Ohio's 21st congressional district 1911-1915	Succeeded by Robert Crosser
U.S. Senate
Preceded by Roscoe C. McCulloch	United States Senator (Class 3) from Ohio; 1930-1939	Succeeded by Robert A. Taft I
