= George Voinovich =

American politician (1936–2016)

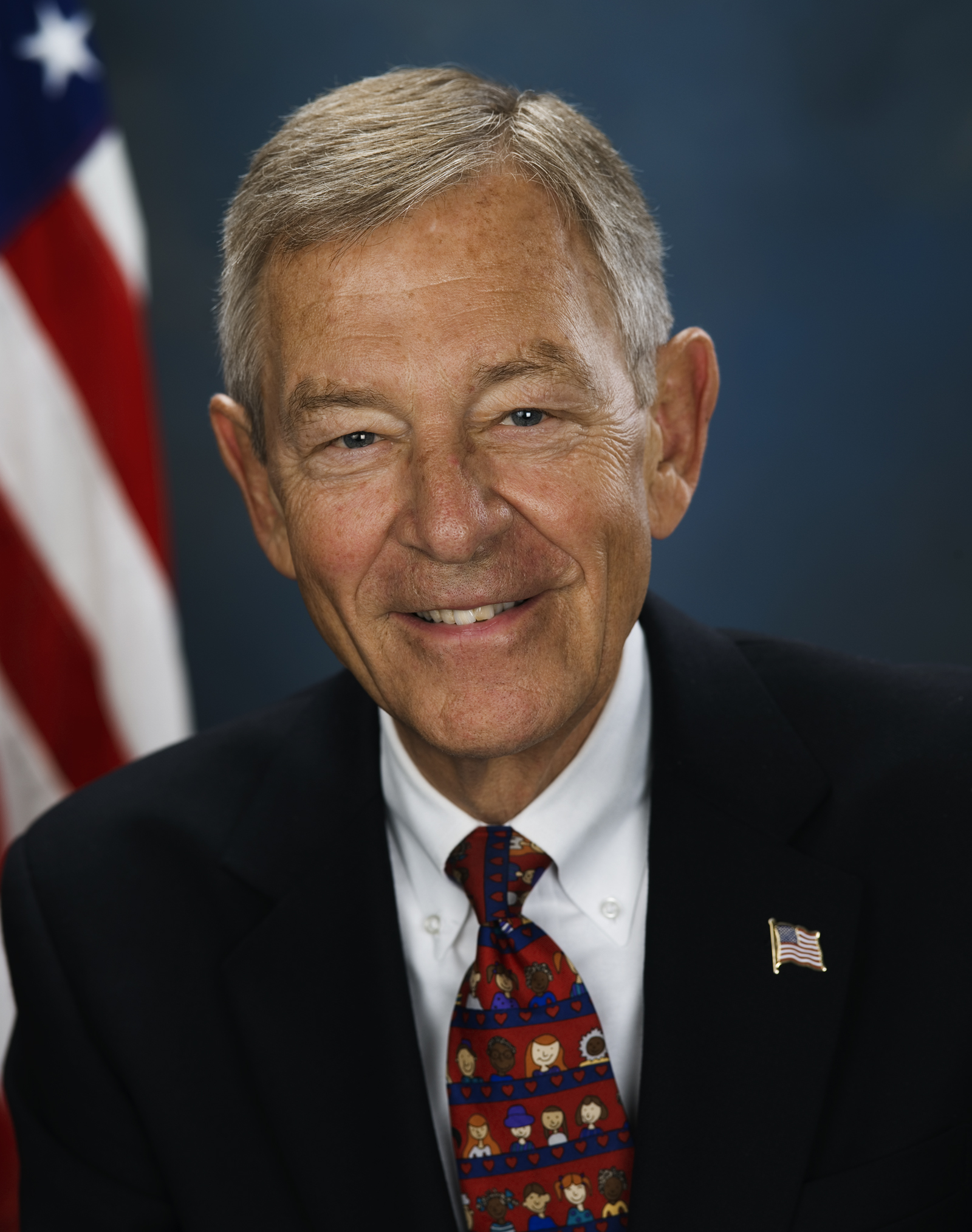
- Official portrait, 2006

United States Senator from Ohio
- In office January 3, 1999 – January 3, 2011
- Preceded by: John Glenn
- Succeeded by: Rob Portman
Senate positions
Chair of the Senate Ethics Committee
In office January 3, 2003 – January 3, 2007
Preceded by	Harry Reid
Succeeded by	Barbara Boxer

Chair of the National Governors Association
- In office July 30, 1997 – August 4, 1998
- Preceded by: Bob Miller
- Succeeded by: Tom Carper

65th Governor of Ohio
- In office January 14, 1991 – December 31, 1998
- Lieutenant: Mike DeWine; Nancy Hollister
- Preceded by: Dick Celeste
- Succeeded by: Nancy Hollister

54th Mayor of Cleveland
- In office January 1, 1980 – December 31, 1989
- Preceded by: Dennis Kucinich
- Succeeded by: Michael White

59th President of the National League of Cities
- In office 1985
- Preceded by: George Latimer
- Succeeded by: Henry Cisneros

56th Lieutenant Governor of Ohio
- In office January 8, 1979 – November 1979
- Governor: Jim Rhodes
- Preceded by: Dick Celeste
- Succeeded by: Myrl Shoemaker

Member of the Ohio House of Representatives from the 53rd district
- In office January 3, 1967 – December 15, 1971
- Preceded by: District established
- Succeeded by: Edward Ryder

Personal details
- Born: George Victor Voinovich; July 15, 1936 Cleveland, Ohio, U.S.
- Died: June 12, 2016 (aged 79) Cleveland, Ohio, U.S.
- Party: Republican
- Spouse: Janet Allan (m. 1962)
- Children: 4
- Education: Ohio University (BA); Ohio State University (JD)
- Voinovich's voice Voinovich on issues with establishing a cabinet department for homeland security Recorded January 17, 2003

George Victor Voinovich (July 15, 1936 – June 12, 2016) was an American politician. A member of the Republican Party, he was a United States senator from Ohio from 1999 to 2011, the 65th governor of Ohio from 1991 to 1998, and the 54th mayor of Cleveland from 1980 to 1989. He is the most recent Republican to serve as mayor of Cleveland as of 2026.

Born and raised in Cleveland, Voinovich graduated from Ohio University and the Ohio State University College of Law. He spent more than 46 years in public service, first as an assistant attorney general in 1963. He began his political career in the Ohio House of Representatives before serving as Cuyahoga County auditor, county commissioner, and Ohio lieutenant governor. He was elected mayor of Cleveland in 1979 and gained national recognition for helping restore the city's financial stability after its 1978 default.

Voinovich was elected governor in 1990 and reelected by a landslide in 1994. As governor, he emphasized economic development and government efficiency. He won election to the U.S. Senate in 1998, where he became known as a moderate Republican and a leading advocate of fiscal responsibility, and was reelected in 2004. Voinovich retired after his second term ended in 2011.

Voinovich was the 15th person to have served as both the governor of Ohio and a U.S. senator and one of only two Cleveland mayors to later become governor of Ohio and a U.S. senator; the other was Frank Lausche. He is also the only person to have served as both chairman of the National Governors Association and president of the National League of Cities.

== Early life and education ==
Voinovich was born in Cleveland, the son of Josephine (Bernot) and George S. Voinovich. He was the oldest of six children. His father was of Serbian descent (from Kordun, Croatia), and his mother was of Slovenian ancestry.

Voinovich grew up in the Collinwood neighborhood of Cleveland and graduated from Collinwood High School in 1954. He was raised Catholic and was a lifelong member of his neighborhood parish, Our Lady of the Lake in Euclid (formerly Holy Cross). He earned a Bachelor of Arts degree in government in 1958 from Ohio University, where he was a member of the fraternity Phi Kappa Tau and served as president of the student body and the men's dormitory system. Voinovich received a Juris Doctor from the Ohio State University College of Law in 1961.

== Early career ==
Voinovich began his career in 1963 as an assistant attorney general. He then served as a member of the Ohio House of Representatives from 1967 until 1971. From 1971 until 1976, he served as County Auditor of Cuyahoga County, Ohio. In 1971, he made an unsuccessful run for the Republican nomination for mayor of Cleveland against Ralph Perk, who went on to win the general election. From 1977 to 1978, Voinovich served as a member of the Cuyahoga County Board of Commissioners. In 1978, he was elected lieutenant governor of Ohio as the running mate of Jim Rhodes. Voinovich was the first Ohio lieutenant governor not to be elected separately from the governor.

== Mayor of Cleveland (1980–1989) ==
=== 1979 Cleveland mayoral election ===
By 1979, elections in Cleveland had become nonpartisan, and with then-Mayor Dennis J. Kucinich (D) about to enter a tough reelection campaign, Voinovich began to consider running for mayor again. Finally, on July 26, he entered the race, calling the decision "one of the most difficult in [his] life". He remained lieutenant governor until he won the election.

Aside from Kucinich, Voinovich's opponents in the race included State Senator Charles Butts and city council majority leader Basil Russo. As the election drew closer, The Plain Dealer endorsed Voinovich. Voter turnout in the primary was greater than that of the 1977 race among Perk, Kucinich and Edward F. Feighan. In the 1979 nonpartisan primary election, Voinovich received 47,000 votes to Kucinich's 36,000. Russo (who got 21,000) and Butts (with 19,000) did not qualify for the general election. The biggest surprise was Voinovich's showing in predominantly African American wards, where he was expected to finish last. He trailed only Butts, with Kucinich last.

On October 8, 1979, a few days after the primary, Voinovich's nine-year-old daughter Molly was struck by a van and killed. The event brought the Voinovich campaign to a virtual halt and made it difficult for Kucinich to attack his opponent. Still, he challenged Voinovich to a series of debates in various Cleveland neighborhoods. Voinovich declined the invitations, saying the debates would be unproductive, but they did debate on November 3 at the City Club. Voinovich won the election with 94,541 votes to Kucinich's 73,755.

Voinovich was reelected twice in landslides. In 1981 he defeated former State Representative Patrick Sweeney, 107,472 to 32,940, to win Cleveland's first four-year mayoral term. In 1985 he defeated former councilman Gary Kucinich (Dennis Kucinich's brother), 82,840 to 32,185.

=== "The Comeback City" ===
Voinovich was considered shy and a rather low-key politician, a description he adopted himself. Once elected, he met with Ohio Governor James Rhodes to solicit the state government's help in clearing up the city's debts. Voinovich negotiated a debt repayment schedule and in October 1980, with the state serving as guarantor, eight local banks lent Cleveland $36.2 million, allowing the city to emerge from default. Still, the city's economy continued to decline, and federal funding was cut. Two weeks earlier, voters turned down another 0.5 percent income tax increase. The opposition was led by Kucinich, who had been keeping a low profile since losing the election. Voinovich said he would resubmit the tax issue on the February ballot to avoid facing a deficit in 1981. That time the voters approved the tax increase.

By the time Voinovich was elected, Cleveland had become the butt of late night comedians' jokes about the Cuyahoga River and Mayor Ralph Perk's hair catching fire (in separate incidents) and as the only major American city to go bankrupt.

Voinovich took an aggressive approach. He reversed a defensive attitude projected by the Cleveland media, going to "war ... to save one of this country's greatest cities". Others soon jumped on board. For instance, The Smythe-Cramer Co., a local realty firm, tried to restore the city's former glory by running a series of ads with photographs of downtown Cleveland captioned "Take Another Look. It's Cleveland!" In May 1981, The Plain Dealer sent its Sunday subscribers bumper stickers reading, "New York's the Big Apple, but Cleveland's a Plum." The paper also passed out thousands of "Cleveland's a Plum" buttons and ran a huge picture of publisher Thomas Vail, with a smiling Voinovich beside him, throwing out the first plum at a Yankees-Indians game. Sportscaster Howard Cosell hailed the city during a baseball game, and Voinovich subsequently presented him with a key to the city. A survey showed 65 percent of the residents of Greater Cleveland were very satisfied with their life in the city and that 57 percent claimed to be very satisfied even in 1978, the year of default. A national poll found Detroit to be the city with the worst image, with New York City second and Cleveland fifth.

The New Cleveland Campaign, a promotion agency formed in 1978, began sending out news releases promoting Cleveland's virtues and circulating reprints whenever it got a favorable story. But to show how much the "new" Cleveland had improved, it had to highlight how bad the old Cleveland was. In particular, it stressed the city's 1978 default of $15.5 million short-term loans from local banks, even though New York City owed nearly 150 times as much when it received a $2.3 billion federal bailout to avoid bankruptcy in 1975.

The restoration campaign reached its peak in October in the society magazine Town and Country's article "Cleveland's Come-Around", which said that "businessmen, lawyers and concerned citizens" had rescued the city from "the petulant, pugnacious Dennis Kucinich". It called Voinovich's Operation Improvement Task Force under E. Mandell de Windt "the most significant undertaking in Cleveland since Moses Cleaveland stepped ashore on the bank of the Cuyahoga River in 1786". It also enticed its readers with Lake Erie and its "beautiful and exciting year-round sailing".

So confident was Voinovich that during election season he even attracted presidential candidates Jimmy Carter and Ronald Reagan to debate in Cleveland. "Cleveland is making a comeback," Time declared at the close of 1980. "During the past year, convention business has flourished, school desegregation has proceeded peacefully, and a modest construction boom has begun.... Most impressive of all, the city dug itself out of default."

=== Downtown development and other improvements ===
In order to allow them to accomplish more, Voinovich felt that the terms for mayor and members of the Cleveland City Council ought to be extended. He offered a referendum to voters to extend them from two to four years and also asked voters to approve cutting the number of council members from 33 to 21 to help ease the city's strained economy. Both proposals passed.

During the Voinovich years neighborhoods began to see some improvement, starting with the Lexington Village housing project, $149 million in Urban Development Action Grants, and $3 billion of construction underway or completed. In particular, the neighborhoods of Hough and Fairfax, then two of Cleveland's worst east side neighborhoods, began to see new houses built and less criminal activity. Voinovich also quietly moved to reconcile the warring groups of the 1970s. He made peace with business leaders and posed with them in photographs that ran in New Cleveland Campaign ads in business magazines, captioned with the Voinovich slogan "Together, we can do it." He refined the neighborhood groups, which, with the breakdown of the Democratic Party, had become the most potent political forces in the city. He also extended his hand to unions, in particular the Teamsters.

As mayor, Voinovich was a member of the National League of Cities, of which he was elected president in 1985. Voinovich also oversaw an urban renaissance downtown. Sohio (purchased by BP America in 1987), Ohio Bell, and Eaton Corporation all built new offices downtown (most notably the BP Building). Brothers Richard and David Jacobs rescued the troubled Cleveland Indians. The two also improved the desolate area located by the Erieview Tower and turned it into the glass-roofed Galleria at Erieview. Voinovich also enticed Society Bank to build the Society Center, the largest skyscraper in Cleveland and the 15th largest in the nation (since renamed Key Tower). In addition, the National Civic League awarded Cleveland the All-America City Award three times in five years (1982, 1984, 1986), in addition to its first, won in 1950.

=== Municipal Light ===
One of the major controversies of the previous Kucinich administration was its cancellation of the sale of Cleveland Municipal Light (now Cleveland Public Power). Kucinich's insistence on saving it from being absorbed into the Cleveland Electric Illuminating Company (CEI) led the business community to force Cleveland into default. Voinovich's successful negotiations reversed this action when he first took office, but Voinovich's pro-business attitude did not change CEI's position on the issue, as they persisted in making efforts to buy out Muni Light and pressuring Voinovich into giving them the right to do so. Voinovich resisted. Early in his tenure, he arranged for capital improvements to strengthen Muni Light's operation, and by 1982, it was able to compete with CEI. He asserted that the company was making attempts to cripple Muni Light by lobbying council against much-needed legislation. "We still have a battle going on," Voinovich said. "They [CEI] are as dedicated as ever to laying away the Municipal Light system."

The rebuilding process began through Voinovich's administration and improvements were made throughout the company including equipment upgrades and increased wages for all employees. To reflect all the changes Municipal Light officially changed its name to Cleveland Public Power (CPP) in 1983. In 1984, the company received the American Municipal Power Association's Scattergood Award for outstanding system operation and achievement.

=== 1988 Senate race ===
In 1988, Voinovich ran for the Senate seat of Howard Metzenbaum, in a hard-fought and negative campaign. Voinovich accused Metzenbaum of being soft on child pornography, charges that were roundly criticized by many, including John Glenn who recorded a statement for television refuting Voinovich's charges. Metzenbaum won the election, 57% to 43%, even as George H. W. Bush carried the state by 11 percentage points.

== Governor of Ohio (1991–1998) ==
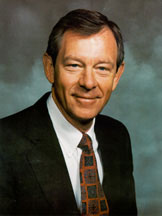
Voinovich as governor

=== Elections ===
In the 1990 Ohio gubernatorial election, Voinovich was nominated by the Republicans to replace Governor Dick Celeste, a Democrat who was barred from running for a third consecutive term. He selected Representative Mike DeWine as his running mate for lieutenant governor. Voinovich defeated the Democratic nominee, Attorney General Anthony J. Celebrezze Jr., by 11 percentage points.

Voinovich was reelected in the 1994 Ohio gubernatorial election, defeating Democrat Rob Burch with 72 percent of the vote, the largest share of the vote of any governor up for election that year and the largest margin of victory for any Ohio governor in the 20th century. For his reelection, Voinovich chose Nancy Hollister as his running mate for lieutenant governor (who would become Ohio's first female lieutenant governor) to replace DeWine, who successfully ran for Senate the same year.

=== Tenure ===
Voinovich's tenure as governor saw Ohio's unemployment rate fall to a 25-year low. The state created more than 500,000 new jobs, the Medicaid growth rate was cut by more than two-thirds, and enrollment in welfare was cut in half. During his first four years, he pulled Ohio out of a $1.5 billion deficit and led efforts to reform welfare and eliminate unfunded mandates. In 1991, Voinovich served as the Chairman of the Midwestern Governors Association. To replace Mary Ellen Withrow, who became the U.S. Treasurer, he appointed Cincinnati mayor Kenneth Blackwell as state treasurer, the first African-American to hold statewide office in Ohio. Blackwell would win election to a full term in the 1994 Ohio State Treasurer election.

In 1995, Voinovich was named Public Official of the Year by the National Journal. He is credited with leading efforts to create a public voucher plan that used public funds to pay tuition at church-affiliated schools. After significant litigation over the program, the US Supreme Court ruled in a 5–4 decision that the program did not violate the constitutional prohibition against promoting religion in public schools. By the end of his second term, Ohio led the nation in percentage of eligible children participating in the Head Start Program.

When the state legislature wanted to close Central State University, Ohio's only historically black state-supported college, Voinovich stepped in by appointing a new board and convincing John Garland to become president.

As both mayor and governor, Voinovich helped to advertise Cleveland as the true birthplace of rock and roll. Beginning in 1985 Voinovich, the City of Cleveland and the State of Ohio began lobbying for the Rock and Roll Hall of Fame and Museum to be built in Cleveland. It eventually opened in 1995. As a nod to his efforts, the Hall's main atrium was renamed the George V. Voinovich Atrium.

In 1996, Voinovich was the first governor to endorse Senator Bob Dole's bid for the Republican presidential nomination. Later, Voinovich was among nine candidates asked to submit to background checks as potential vice-presidential running mates for Dole. Voinovich withdrew his name from consideration, reiterating his desire to run for the U.S. Senate in 1998.

== U.S. Senate (1999–2011) ==
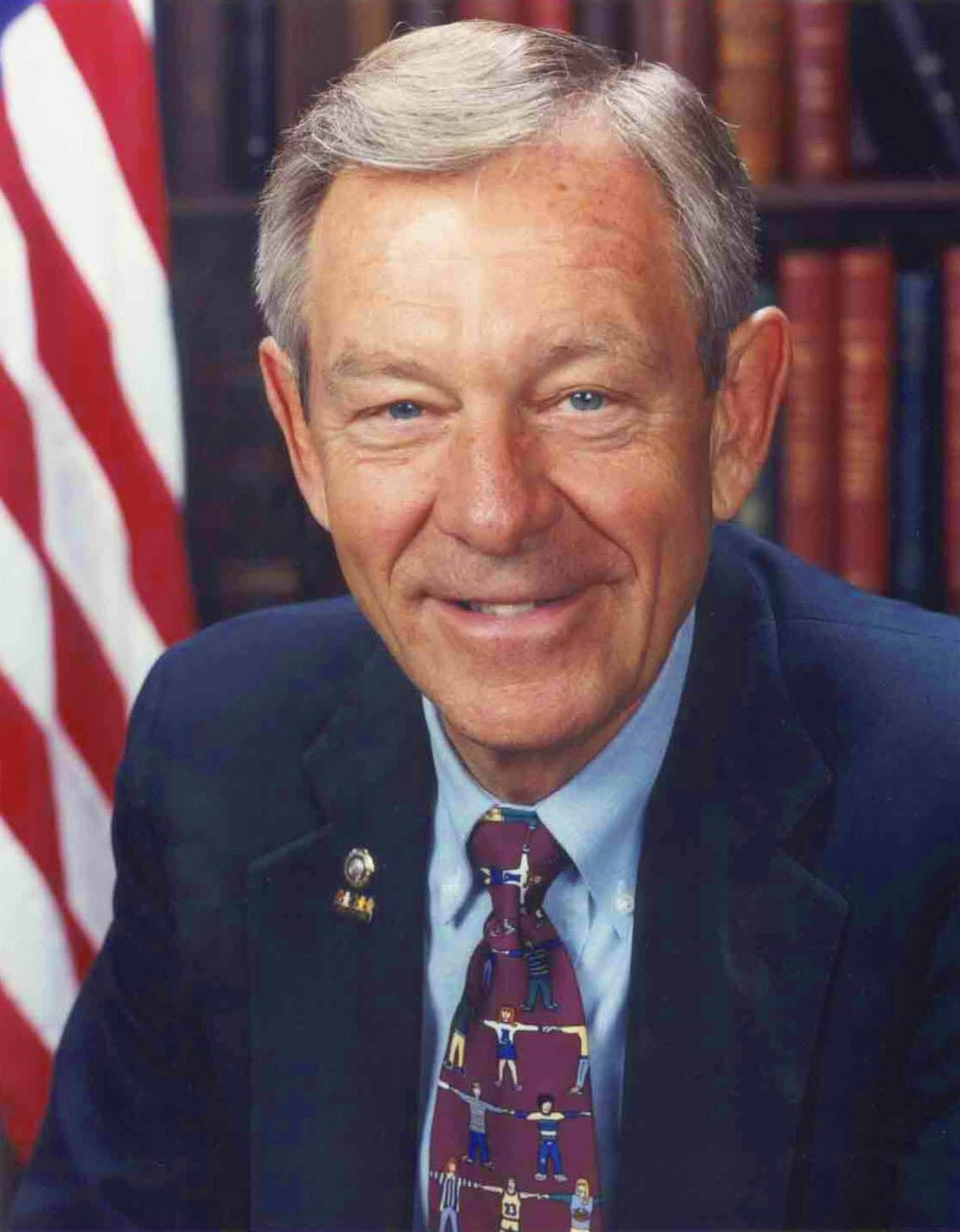
An earlier photo of Senator Voinovich

=== Elections ===
In 1998, barred by term limits from running for a third term as governor, Voinovich ran for the United States Senate seat vacated by the retirement of longtime incumbent Democrat John Glenn. He won the election over Democratic nominee Mary O. Boyle. Voinovich was briefly succeeded by Lieutenant Governor Hollister upon his resignation as governor and before he entered the Senate. Hollister was succeeded by the newly elected Bob Taft in January 1999, marking the first time a Republican governor in Ohio had been succeeded by another Republican governor since 1904.

Voinovich was then reelected to a second term in 2004, defeating Democratic nominee Eric Fingerhut with 64 percent of the vote. Voinovich won all 88 Ohio counties and the most votes ever in a U.S. Senate race in Ohio, 3.5 million.

In a press conference in January 2009, Voinovich announced he would not be seeking a third term, saying, "I must devote my full time, energy and focus to the job I was elected to do, the job in front of me, which seeking a third term — with the money-raising and campaigning that it would require — would not allow me to do." Voinovich also said that after 44 years in public office it was time for him to relax and spend time with his wife Janet and his family. Upon Voinovich's announcement, The Plain Dealer wrote, "After decades in an arena that has sullied so many, Voinovich's personal integrity remains unquestioned. He has never been afraid to work across the aisle, and has never forgotten that tax money comes from the wallets of hard-working people."

=== Tenure ===
For the first eight years, Voinovich became Ohio's junior senator to DeWine, his first lieutenant governor, until DeWine's defeat to Sherrod Brown in 2006. Voinovich then became the state's senior senator until this term expired, when he officially retired. In the Senate, Voinovich opposed lowering tax rates. He frequently joined Democrats on tax issues. The Herald-Star wrote that Voinovich "considers the impact of his votes...choosing carefully without regard for what the political impact might be on him personally". Government Executive wrote, "no matter what anyone thinks of George Voinovich or Daniel Akaka's politics in general, no one can deny that they know their federal employee issues cold."

==== Domestic policy ====
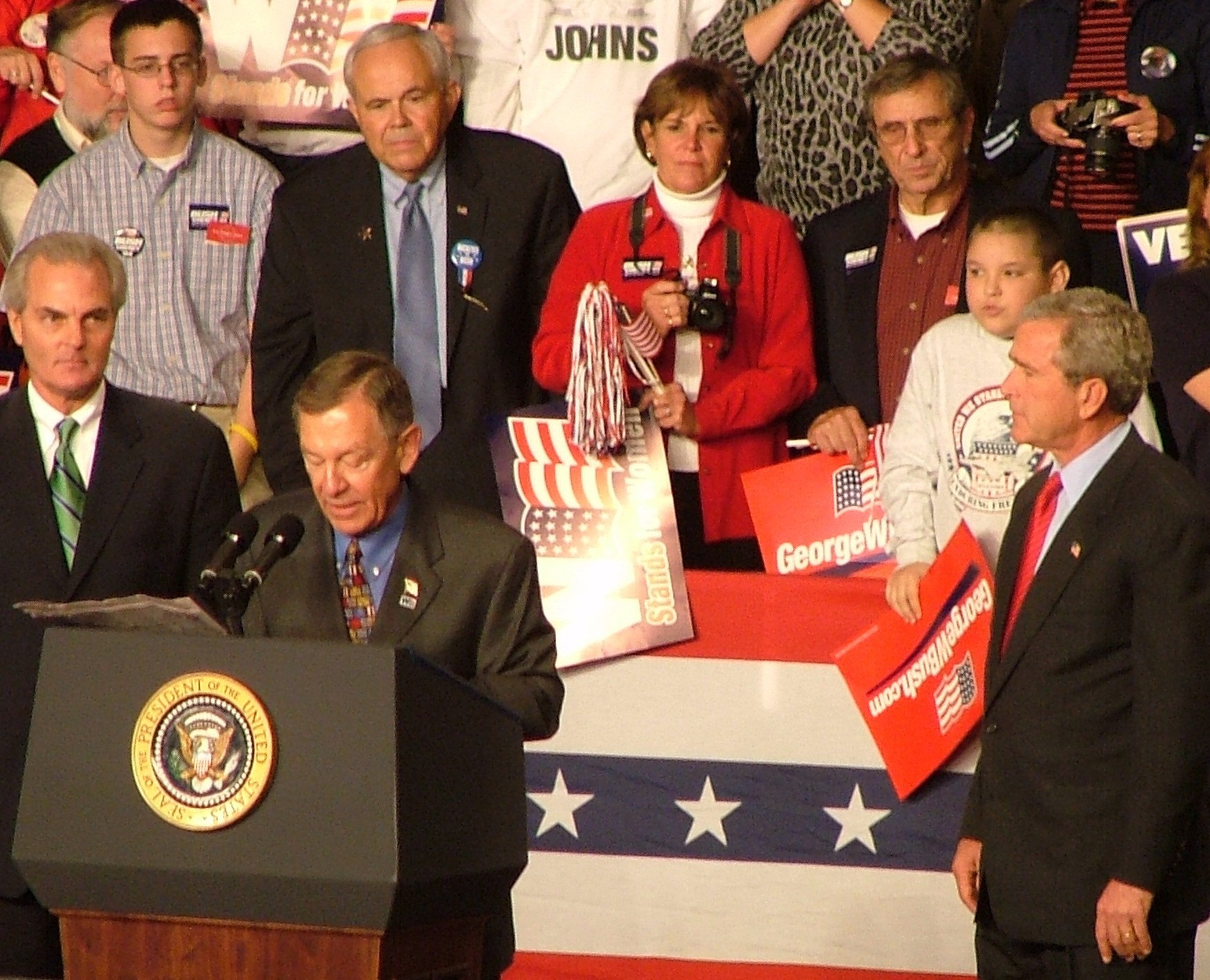
Voinovich introducing President George W. Bush at an Ohio campaign rally in 2004

In 2000, Voinovich was the only Republican in Congress to vote against a bill providing for relief from the "marriage penalty". He was the main sponsor of five-year reauthorizations of the Appalachian Regional Commission (ARC) in 2002 and 2008, which fostered economic development in the 13 Appalachian states and in Ohio's 29 Appalachian counties. Voinovich authored the National Infrastructure Improvement Act of 2007, which established a commission to provide concrete recommendations for current and future infrastructure needs.

Voinovich long championed the need for a "Second Declaration of Independence", referring to the nation's energy situation. He supported clean air legislation ("Voinovich has idea on clearing the air", The Dayton Daily News, April 30, 2002) and argued for nuclear-energy development because it "provides a dependable, continuous stream of electricity, supports thousands of jobs, and does not emit any greenhouse gases" ("Depoliticizing decisions", The Columbus Dispatch, June 12, 2010). He served as Chairman and ranking member of the EPW Clean Air and Nuclear Safety Subcommittee, introducing legislation that helped to pave the way for applications for new nuclear power plants in the U.S.

Voinovich sponsored legislation aimed to protect the Great Lakes from foreign species and preserve "our ultimate jewels, the five Great Lakes". He lobbied his colleagues in the Senate as well as Great Lakes governors and administration officials to take real action. Working with Senator Carl Levin, he introduced legislation to ratify the Great Lakes Compact, a bipartisan agreement among the Great Lakes states to protect the Great Lakes through better water management, conservation, and public involvement. When Michigan became the eighth state to accede to the Great Lakes Compact on July 9, 2008, Voinovich was one of the leading legislators in supporting the interstate compact's passage in Congress.

On January 20, 2009, Voinovich was appointed to the Appropriations Committee. His appointment marked the first time an Ohioan served on the coveted Senate committee since Mike DeWine lost his 2006 reelection bid. In accepting the appointment, Voinovich relinquished his seat on the Foreign Relations Committee.

From June 25, 2007 to January 3, 2009, Voinovich sat at what is traditionally known as the Senate's "candy desk". On July 22, 2009, Voinovich opposed a measure that would have allowed people to cross state lines with concealed weapons. Voinovich voted in favor of the Matthew Shepard Act in October 2009.

As the Senate's leading debt hawk, Voinovich introduced the Securing America's Future Economy (SAFE) Commission Act in every Congress in which he served. The measure proposed the establishment of a national commission to examine the nation's tax and entitlement systems and present long-term solutions to place the United States on a fiscally sustainable course and ensure the solvency of entitlement programs for future generations. In January 2010, Voinovich met with President Obama to discuss the urgency of the nation's fiscal crisis. Four days later, Obama publicly endorsed the Conrad-Gregg statutory debt commission, which was modeled after Voinovich's SAFE Commission. In his 2010 State of the Union address Obama announced that he would create the debt commission by executive order because it had failed to pass the Senate.

On December 18, 2010, Voinovich voted in favor of the Don't Ask, Don't Tell Repeal Act of 2010.

==== Foreign policy ====
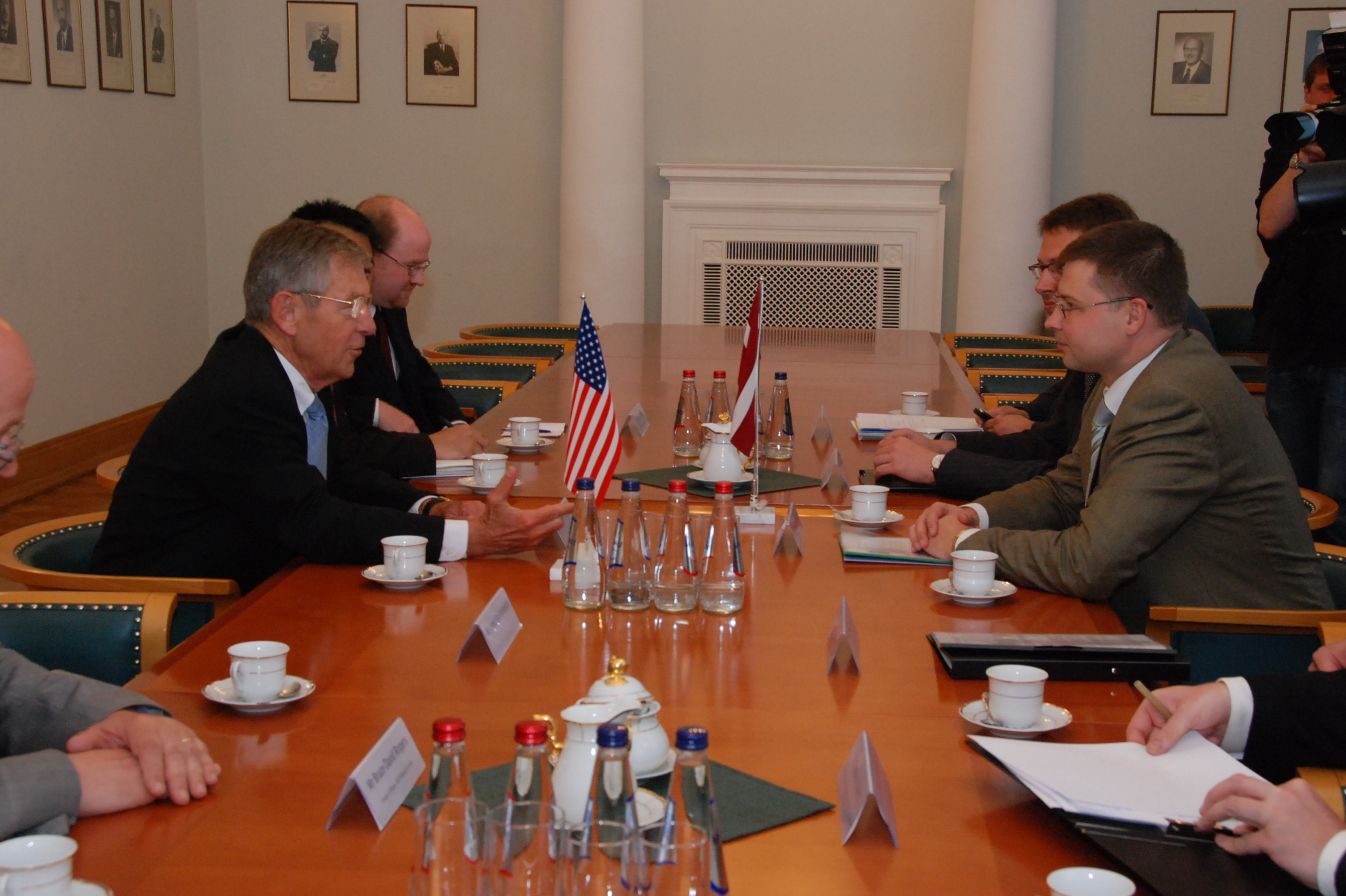
Voinovich meeting Latvian Prime Minister Valdis Dombrovskis in 2009

Voinovich gained national attention when he gave a speech tearfully opposing President George W. Bush's nomination of John Bolton for U.S. Ambassador to the United Nations at Bolton's hearing in front of the Senate Foreign Relations Committee. Voinovich remarked, "I don't feel comfortable voting today on Mr. John Bolton." As a result, the committee recessed without a vote, stalling the nomination. Democrats refused to invoke cloture and end debate on the nomination; the first time, Voinovich voted to end debate, but the second time he joined Democrats in voting to extend debate and urged Bush to choose another nominee. Bolton was ultimately confirmed by the Senate and served as ambassador until 2006.

In January 2007, Voinovich expressed concern to Secretary of State Condoleezza Rice that Bush's plan to increase troop levels in Iraq would not be effective: "At this stage of the game, I don't think it's going to happen." As a moderate Republican, Voinovich was viewed as one of few who could potentially influence Bush. Five months later, Voinovich wrote Bush a five-page letter requesting that the U.S. begin pulling troops from Iraq and that the Iraqis start taking care of their own territory, calling for a "comprehensive plan for our country's gradual military disengagement from Iraq".

On April 7, 2008, Voinovich departed from the Republican platform and stated at a Senate Foreign Relations Committee hearing regarding the war in Iraq: "We've kind of bankrupted this country" through war spending. "We're in a recession ... and God knows how long it's going to last."

Called "the Senate's leading Balkan expert" and a "leader in the fight against anti-Semitism and hate crime against all groups," Voinovich was a key voice on the Foreign Relations Committee about the Organization for Security and Co-operation in Europe and the relationship between the United States and countries in Eastern Europe in particular. He played a leadership role in strengthening and enlarging NATO and was the only member of Congress in the room at the 2002 NATO summit in Prague, where membership was formally extended to Latvia, Bulgaria, Estonia, Lithuania, Romania, Slovakia, and Slovenia. Voinovich was an active participant in the annual Brussels Forum from its inception in 2007, and served as chairman of the U.S. congressional delegation to the conference in 2010.

As senator and a prominent member of its Foreign Relations Committee, Voinovich consistently supported measures to strengthen Israel. In addition, Voinovich devoted himself to combating anti-Semitism, especially through involvement in the Organization of Security and Cooperation in Europe and its Office of Democratic Institutions and Human Rights.

=== Committee assignments ===
- Senate Select Committee on Ethics (Chairman)
- Committee on Appropriations
  - Subcommittee on Commerce, Justice, Science, and Related Agencies
  - Subcommittee on Energy and Water Development
  - Subcommittee on Homeland Security (Ranking Member)
  - Subcommittee on State, Foreign Operations, and Related Programs
  - Subcommittee on Transportation, Housing and Urban Development, and Related Agencies
- United States Senate Committee on Foreign Relations
- Committee on Environment and Public Works
  - Subcommittee on Clean Air and Nuclear Safety (Chairman & Ranking Member)
  - Subcommittee on Green Jobs and the New Economy
  - Subcommittee on Transportation and Infrastructure (Ranking Member)
- Committee on Homeland Security and Governmental Affairs
  - Subcommittee on Federal Financial Management, Government Information and International Security
  - Subcommittee on Oversight of Government Management, the Federal Workforce and the District of Columbia (Chairman & Ranking Member)
  - Ad Hoc Subcommittee on State, Local, and Private Sector Preparedness and Integration

== Personal life and death ==
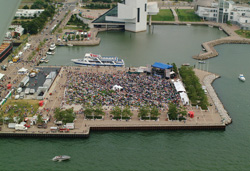
Voinovich Bicentennial Park in Cleveland's North Coast Harbor district, shown during a 2009 concert

Plaques at the Voinovich Livestock Center in Columbus, noting the Farm Bureau Memorial Tree and "Spountain" sculpture

Voinovich married his wife, Janet (née Allan), in 1962. They had four children, George, Betsy, Peter, and Molly, and nine grandchildren. Molly, their youngest child, was killed at age 9 after being struck by a van as she walked home from school.

In June 2003, doctors implanted a pacemaker into Voinovich's heart because his heart rate had slowed down due to progressive sinus bradycardia. After retiring in January 2011, Voinovich was named a Senior Fellow at Cleveland State University at the Maxine Goodman Levin College of Urban Affairs, and Ohio Visiting Professor of Leadership and Public Affairs at the George V. Voinovich School of Leadership and Public Affairs at Ohio University.

On June 10, 2016, two days before his death, Voinovich delivered public remarks at the 25th Slovenian Independence Day event at Cleveland City Hall. He was to be a delegate to the July 2016 Republican National Convention in Cleveland. Voinovich died at his home in Cleveland on June 12, 2016, at the age of 79.

=== Legacy ===
Voinovich has been honored several times in his hometown of Cleveland by having prominent landmarks named after him, including Voinovich Bicentennial Park in the city's North Coast Harbor district and the George V. Voinovich Bridges spanning downtown.

In 1998, Ohio University renamed the Institute of Local Government and Rural Development the Voinovich Center for Leadership and Public Affairs, and in 2007 the Ohio Board of Regents voted to rename the center a school. Since being honored in 1998, Voinovich remained committed to the success of the school.

The Voinovich Livestock Center at the Ohio Expo Center and State Fair in Columbus is named in honor of Voinovich. The lawn in front of the center is the site of "Spountain", a sculpture by Barry Gunderson. It is also the site of the Farm Bureau Memorial tree, which was planted in soil from all 88 Ohio counties in 1976 during the Ohio Farm Bureau Bicentennial.

== Electoral history ==
Mayor of Cleveland: 1979–1985 U.S. Senate elections in Ohio: 1988, 1998–2004 Governor of Ohio: 1990–1994
Year	Office	Democrat	Votes	Pct	Republican	Votes	Pct	3rd Party	Party	Votes	Pct
1979	Mayor	Dennis J. Kucinich	73,505	44%	George Voinovich	94,407	56%				
1981	Mayor	Patrick Sweeney	32,940	23%	George Voinovich	107,472	77%				
1985	Mayor	Gary J. Kucinich	32,185	28%	George Voinovich	82,840	72%				
1988	U.S. Senate	Howard Metzenbaum	2,480,038	57%	George Voinovich	1,872,716	43%				
1990	Governor	Anthony J. Celebrezze Jr.	1,539,416	44%	George Voinovich	1,938,103	56%				
1994	Governor	Robert L. Burch	835,849	25%	George Voinovich	2,401,572	72%	Billy Inmon	Independent	108,745	3%
1998	U.S. Senate	Mary Boyle	1,482,054	44%	George Voinovich	1,922,087	56%				
2004	U.S. Senate	Eric D. Fingerhut	1,961,249	36%	George Voinovich	3,464,651	64%				

*Write-in and minor candidate notes: In 1988, write-ins received 151 votes. In 1990, David Marshall received 82 votes and James E. Attia received 49 votes. In 1994, Keith Hatton received 48 votes and Michael Italie received 24 votes. In 1998, write-ins received 210 votes. In 2004, Helen Meyers received 296 votes.

== See also ==
- Ohio gubernatorial elections

Political offices
Preceded by Dick Celeste	Lieutenant Governor of Ohio; 1979	Succeeded by Myrl Shoemaker
Preceded by Dennis Kucinich	Mayor of Cleveland; 1980–1989	Succeeded by Michael White
Preceded by Dick Celeste	Governor of Ohio; 1991–1998	Succeeded by Nancy Hollister
Preceded by Bob Miller	Chair of the National Governors Association; 1997–1998	Succeeded by Tom Carper
Party political offices
Preceded by John William Brown	Republican nominee for Lieutenant Governor of Ohio; 1978	Succeeded by Jim Betts
Preceded by Paul Pfeifer	Republican nominee for U.S. Senator from Ohio (Class 1); 1988	Succeeded by Mike DeWine
Preceded by Jim Rhodes	Republican nominee for Governor of Ohio; 1990, 1994	Succeeded by Bob Taft
Preceded by Tommy Thompson	Chair of the Republican Governors Association; 1992–1993	Succeeded by Jock McKernan
Preceded by Mike DeWine	Republican nominee for U.S. Senator from Ohio (Class 3); 1998, 2004	Succeeded by Rob Portman
U.S. Senate
Preceded by John Glenn	U.S. Senator (Class 3) from Ohio; 1999–2011; Served alongside: Mike DeWine, Sherrod Brown	Succeeded by Rob Portman
Preceded by Harry Reid	Chair of the Senate Ethics Committee; 2003–2007	Succeeded by Barbara Boxer
