= 2002 Ohio State Treasurer election =

- November 5, 2002

Nominee	Joe Deters	Mary O. Boyle
Party	Republican	Democratic
Popular vote	1,666,844	1,459,113
Percentage	53.32%	46.68%
- County results Deters: 50–60% 60–70% 70–80% Boyle: 50–60% 60–70%
State Treasurer before election
Joe Deters
Republican
Elected State Treasurer
Joe Deters
Republican

The 2002 Ohio State Treasurer election was held on November 5, 2002, to elect the Ohio State Treasurer. Republican incumbent Treasurer Joe Deters defeated his Democratic opponent, former Ohio House Representative Mary O. Boyle, with 53.32% of the vote.

Deters would not serve a full second term as Treasurer as he would go on to resign in 2005 after winning election to Hamilton County Prosecuting Attorney.

== Republican primary ==
=== Candidates ===
- Joe Deters, incumbent Ohio State Treasurer (1999–2005)

=== Campaign ===
The Republican primary was held on May 7, 2002. Deters won renomination without opposition.

=== Results ===
Republican primary results
Party	Candidate	Votes	%
Republican	Joe Deters	504,334	100%
Total votes		504,334	100.0%

== Democratic primary ==
=== Candidates ===
- Mary O. Boyle, former Ohio House Representative (1979–1984)
- Willis Blackshear, Montgomery County Recorder

=== Campaign ===
The Democratic primary was held on May 7, 2002. Boyle easily defeated Blackshear, her only opponent, in a landslide, winning 81.45% of the vote.

=== Results ===
Democratic primary results
Party	Candidate	Votes	%
Democratic	Mary O. Boyle	386,029	81.45%
Democratic	Willis Blackshear	87,928	18.55%
Total votes		473,957	100.0%

== General election ==
=== Candidates ===
- Joe Deters, incumbent Ohio State Treasurer (1999–2005) (Republican)
- Mary O. Boyle, former Ohio House Representative (1979–1984) (Democratic)
- Robert Martin (Write-in)

=== Results ===
2002 State Treasurer election results
Party	Candidate	Votes	%	±%
Republican	Joe Deters	1,666,844	53.32%	−0.54%
Democratic	Mary O. Boyle	1,459,113	46.68%	+0.54%
Write-in	Robert Martin	108	0.00%	N/A
Total votes		3,126,065	100.0%	
Republican hold		Swing		
