= Nancy Hollister =

American politician (born 1949)

66th Governor of Ohio
- In office December 31, 1998 – January 11, 1999
- Lieutenant: Vacant
- Preceded by: George Voinovich
- Succeeded by: Bob Taft

60th Lieutenant Governor of Ohio
- In office January 9, 1995 – December 31, 1998
- Governor: George Voinovich
- Preceded by: Mike DeWine
- Succeeded by: Maureen O'Connor

Member of the Ohio House of Representatives
- In office January 11, 1999 – December 31, 2004
- Preceded by: Tom Johnson
- Succeeded by: Jennifer Garrison
- Constituency: 96th district (1999-2003); 93rd district (2003-2004)

Mayor of Marietta
- In office 1984–1991
- Preceded by: George Cranston
- Succeeded by: Brooks Harper

Personal details
- Born: May 22, 1949 (age 77) Terre Haute, Indiana, U.S.
- Party: Republican
- Spouse: Jeff Hollister (m. 1970)
- Children: 5
- Education: Kent State University (attended)

Nancy Elizabeth Hollister (née Putnam; born May 22, 1949) is an American politician who was the 66th governor of Ohio from December 1998 to January 1999. Hollister was the first, and until 2027, only female Ohio governor. A member of the Republican Party, she previously served as the 60th lieutenant governor of Ohio under George Voinovich and succeeded him after he resigned to join the U.S. Senate. Hollister later served in the Ohio House of Representatives from 1999 to 2004.

Hollister attended Kent State University, and upon leaving college she became a housewife. She began her political career in the 1980s, first becoming a member of the city council in Marietta, Ohio, and eventually being elected mayor. In the 1994 Ohio gubernatorial election, George Voinovich picked her as his candidate for lieutenant governor. Hollister ran to represent Ohio's 6th congressional district in 1998, but lost to incumbent Ted Strickland.

After Voinovich resigned, Hollister served as governor for 11 days, taking few political actions during her brief tenure. She was appointed to a seat in the Ohio House of Representatives almost immediately after leaving the governorship, where she was succeeded by fellow Republican Bob Taft. She won election to a full term in 2000 and 2002. In 2004, Hollister was defeated for re-election, attributed in part to her opposition to a constitutional amendment outlawing gay marriage.

== Early life and education ==
Nancy Putnam was born in Terre Haute, Indiana, the daughter of Benjamin Hay Putnam Jr. (1925-2007) and Mary Elizabeth White (1926-1990). Her parents had married in 1945 in West Virginia and had moved briefly back to Terre Haute (her mother's hometown) before moving to Marietta, Ohio, where her father's family resided. Her 6th great-grandfather was Revolutionary War General Israel Putnam. Her 8th great-grandmother was Bathsheba Folger Pope, an accuser of witches during the Salem Witch Trials. She has five siblings: Emily, Esther, Sarah and Benjamin Hay Putnam, III.

Hollister attended Kent State University majoring in communications. She was active in protests on campus, including protesting curfews placed on women students, a policy which would later be abolished. Hollister left to marry her husband Jeff, just two months before the Kent State shootings.

== Early political career (1980–1994) ==
Nancy Hollister first entered public office when she was elected to the Marietta City Council in 1980. Hollister would serve on city council until being elected Mayor of Marietta in 1984. As Mayor, Hollister worked to attract new businesses to the area, promote tourism, and secured funding for a new bridge across the Ohio River.

Since Hollister was a mayor in Southeastern Ohio, Governor George Voinovich appointed Nancy Hollister as director of the Governor's Office of Appalachia. In this position, Hollister was responsible for coordinating federal and state efforts to improve life for the twenty-nine counties in Appalachia.

== Lieutenant governor of Ohio (1995–1998) ==
In 1994, Hollister was selected by Voinovich as his running mate to replace incumbent lieutenant governor Mike DeWine, who was running for the U.S. Senate. Her selection was thought to be beneficial for Voinovich, who had lost many counties downstate in 1990, and helpful for attracting women to the ticket. Her election in November made her the first woman to be elected Lieutenant Governor.

Hollister would oversee several State and Local Government Commissions. These included the Governor's Office of Appalachia, the Governor's Workforce Development Board, the Ohio Department of Agriculture, the Ohio Bureau of Employment Services, the Ohio School-to-Work Initiative, the Office of Housing and Community Partnership, the Ohio Coal Development Office, and the Ohio Farmland Preservation Task Force. In 1998, she was inducted into the Ohio Women's Hall of Fame.

=== 1998 Ohio's 6th congressional district election ===
In 1996, Hollister began raising funds for a bid for Ohio Secretary of State in 1998. A bid to succeed Voinovich as governor was seen as complicated by Voinovich's implicit endorsement of Bob Taft for governor. In 1997, she began reconsidering and considered a bid for the 6th congressional district against incumbent Democrat Ted Strickland. On July 1, 1997, Hollister announced her intent to run for congress. In the primary, Hollister defeated former congressman Frank Cremeans by 4 points. She faced difficulty due to her moderate stances, but won out due to a divided conservative vote.

The race was viewed as highly competitive, in part due to the fact that the district had ousted an incumbent every election since 1990. A big issue in the race was education, as the district contained some of the least affluent school districts in the state. Strickland supported more government funding in schools and hiring more teachers, whereas Hollister supported reducing the size of the Department of Education to give funds through block grants. Hollister received the endorsements of George Voinovich and John Boehner, and campaigned alongside House Speaker Newt Gingrich and Bob Dole. On November 3, 1998, Hollister was defeated by Strickland 57% to 43%.

== Governor of Ohio (1998–1999) ==
On the same day Hollister was defeated in her bid for the 6th congressional district seat, Governor George Voinovich was elected to the United States Senate, and Bob Taft was elected to the governorship.

Voinovich resigned as governor on December 31, 1998, so he could be sworn into the Senate three days later, and with that, Hollister became governor. Hollister became Ohio's first female governor. She only served 11 days in office - which would also make her Ohio's shortest-serving governor - as she was essentially finishing out Voinovich's term. During her transitory time in office, she signed a piece of legislation allowing farmers to sell land to local governments to ensure the land would remain farmland, and that local governments would pay the farmers dependent on land value. She was succeeded by Taft, whose term officially began on January 11, 1999.

== Ohio House of Representatives (1999–2004) ==
Upon leaving the Governor's office, Hollister was appointed to the Ohio House of Representatives for the 96th district, replacing outgoing Rep. Tom Johnson, who took a job with Governor Taft. She ran for and was elected to the seat in 2000 and 2002, when she ran in the redrawn 93rd district. During her tenure, Hollister introduced a bill allowing nurses to prescribe prescription drugs. The bill went into effect in 2002.

In her final run for office to date, Hollister was defeated by Jennifer Garrison in 2004. A key issue in the campaign was Hollister's opposition to a constitutional amendment to ban same-sex marriage. Garrison – the Democrat – ran to the ideological right of Hollister on the state's same-sex marriage ban.

== Personal life ==
She married Jeffrey Lynn Hollister, her boyfriend since high school, on March 21, 1970. They have five children: Jonathan Dunham Hollister (b. 1970), Jeremy Douglas Hollister (b. 1973), Justin Harrington Hollister (b. 1976), Emily Elizabeth Hollister (b. 1979) and Sarah Katherine Hollister (b. 1982).

Hollister served on the board of trustees of the Ohio History Connection between 2011 and 2016. In May 2016, she was appointed by Governor John Kasich to fill a vacancy on the Ohio Board of Education. As of October 2020, Hollister is an ad-hoc board member of the Friends of the Museums, which manages the Campus Martius Museum and Ohio River Museum in Marietta.

In November 2026, Hollister was named an honorary co-chair for the inaugural committee of Governor-elect Amy Acton, alongside all other then-living former governors.

== See also ==
- List of female governors in the United States
- List of female lieutenant governors in the United States
- List of Ohio lieutenant gubernatorial elections
- Ohio's 6th congressional district

Party political offices
Preceded by Mike DeWine	Republican nominee for Lieutenant Governor of Ohio; 1994	Succeeded by Maureen O'Connor
Political offices
Preceded by Mike DeWine	Lieutenant Governor of Ohio; 1995–1998	Succeeded by Maureen O'Connor
Preceded by George Voinovich	Governor of Ohio; 1998–1999	Succeeded by Bob Taft
U.S. order of precedence (ceremonial)
Preceded by Dick Celeste as Former Governor	Order of precedence of the United States	Succeeded by Bob Taft as Former Governor
