= Rob Burch (politician) =

American politician

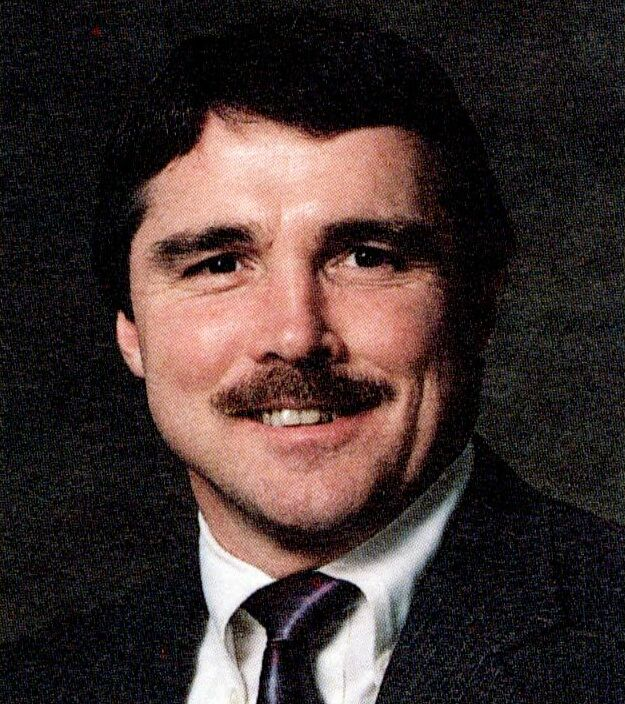

Member of the Ohio Senate from the 30th district
- In office January 3, 1985 – December 31, 1996
- Preceded by: Bill Ress
- Succeeded by: Greg DiDonato

Personal details
- Born: September 30, 1949 (age 76) Louisville, Kentucky, U.S.
- Party: Democratic
- Education: Kent State University (BA); Georgetown University (JD)

Robert Leonard Burch Jr. (born September 30, 1949) is an American politician of the Democratic party.

In 1994, Burch, then an Ohio state senator, was the Democratic nominee for Ohio governor and he ran to unseat incumbent Republican Gov. George Voinovich. Burch's campaign was woefully underfunded against Voinovich's $8 million warchest and although he campaigned hard, his name never registered with the public and he was buried in the general election, winning only a quarter of the vote and joining his fellow Ohio Democrats in a series of defeats.

In 1996 and 1998, Burch ran for a seat in the United States House of Representatives (Ohio's 18th district), but lost to incumbent Republican Robert W. Ney both times.

== See also ==
- Ohio gubernatorial elections
- Ohio's 18th congressional district

Party political offices
Preceded by Anthony Celebrezze	Democratic nominee for Governor of Ohio; 1994	Succeeded by Lee Fisher
