= 1990 Ohio gubernatorial election =

- November 6, 1990
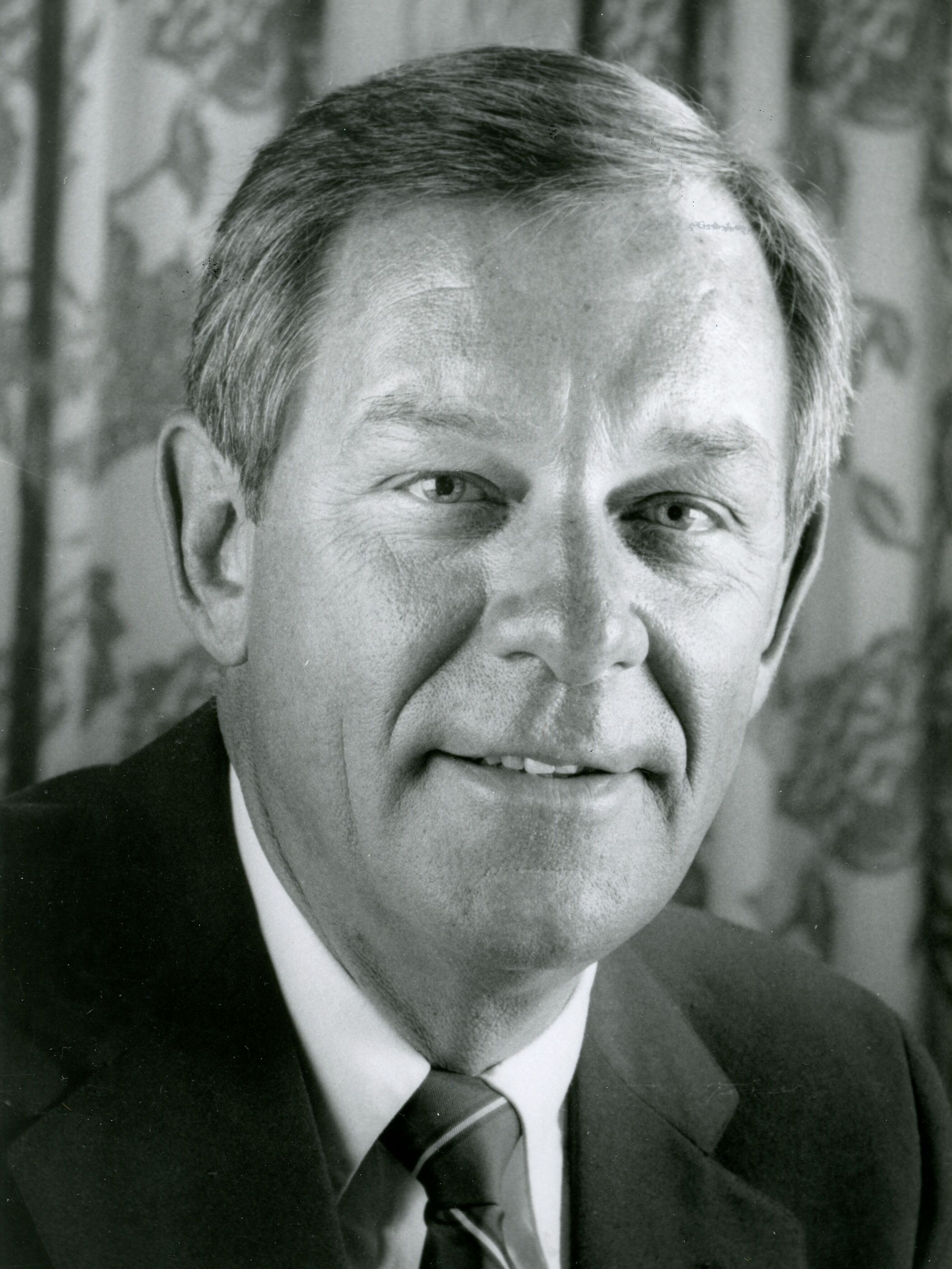

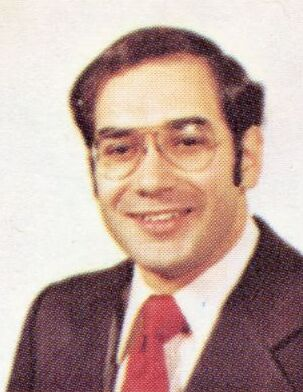
Nominee	George Voinovich	Anthony J. Celebrezze Jr.
Party	Republican	Democratic
Running mate	Mike DeWine	Eugene Branstool
Popular vote	1,938,103	1,539,416
Percentage	55.73%	44.27%
- Voinovich: 50–60% 60–70% 70–80% 80–90% Celebrezze: 50–60% 60–70% 70–80%
Governor before election
Dick Celeste
Democratic
Elected Governor
George Voinovich
Republican

The 1990 Ohio gubernatorial election was held on November 6, 1990. Incumbent Democratic governor Dick Celeste was unable to run for a third consecutive term due to term limits. Former mayor of Cleveland George Voinovich, who also ran for the United States Senate in 1988, was uncontested for the Republican nomination, while Ohio Attorney General Anthony J. Celebrezze Jr. emerged from the Democratic primary. In the end, Voinovich was able to defeat Celebrezze by a fairly wide margin, winning his first term in office.

Abortion was a key issue of the election. Celebrezze switched from his lifelong anti-abortion position to a pro-choice position nine days before declaring his candidacy. Assuming that this would help him in a mostly pro-choice state, he raised the issue frequently. Because of this, the topic of abortion made the news. This allowed Voinovich to have an issue to criticize Celebrezze's integrity, contributing to Voinovich's win.

== Democratic primary ==
=== Candidates ===
- Anthony J. Celebrezze Jr., Attorney General of Ohio
- Michael Hugh Lord, businessman

=== Results ===
Democratic primary results
Party	Candidate	Votes	%
Democratic	Anthony J. Celebrezze, Jr.	683,932	83.85
Democratic	Michael Hugh Lord	131,564	16.13
Democratic	Write-ins	191	0.02
Total votes		815,687	100.00

== Republican primary ==
=== Candidates ===
- George Voinovich, former mayor of Cleveland, former lieutenant governor and nominee for the U.S. Senate in 1988

=== Results ===
Republican primary results
Party	Candidate	Votes	%
Republican	George Voinovich	645,224	100.00
Total votes		645,224	100.00

== General election ==
=== Results ===
Ohio gubernatorial election, 1990
Party	Candidate	Votes	%	±%
Republican	George Voinovich	1,938,103	55.73%	+16.36%
Democratic	Anthony J. Celebrezze Jr.	1,539,416	44.27%	−16.33%
Write-ins		131	0.00%	
Majority		398,687	11.46%	−9.77%
Turnout		3,477,650		
Republican gain from Democratic		Swing		
