= 1985 Cleveland mayoral election =

- November 5, 1985
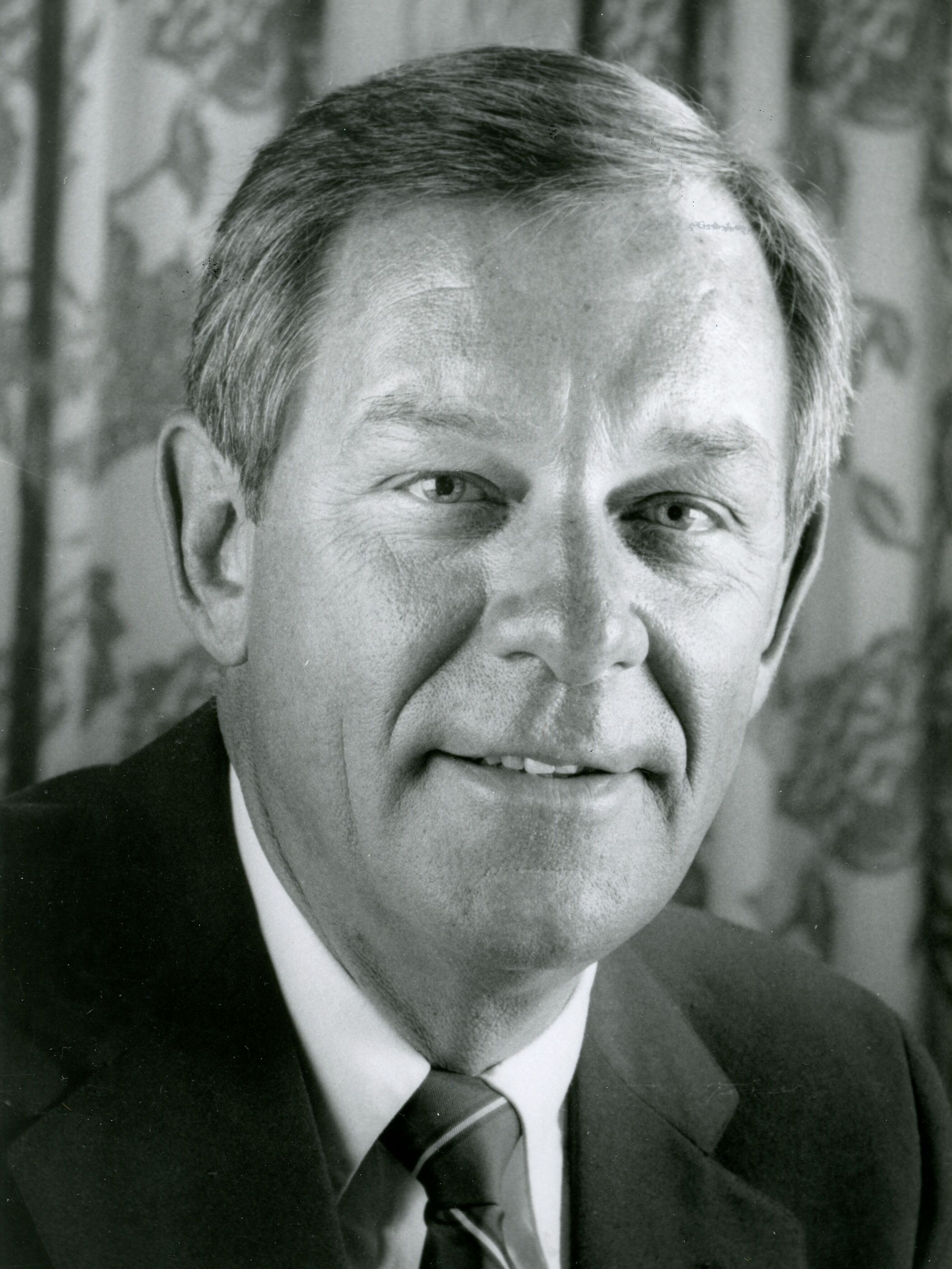

Candidate	George Voinovich	Gary Kucinich
Party	Nonpartisan	Nonpartisan
Popular vote	82,840	32,185
Percentage	72.02%	27.98%
Mayor before election
George Voinovich
Republican
Elected mayor
George Voinovich
Republican

The 1985 Cleveland mayoral election took place on November 5, 1985, to elect the Mayor of Cleveland, Ohio. The election was officially nonpartisan, with the top two candidates from the October 1 primary advancing to the general election.

Voinovich's top opponent was council member Gary Kucinich, brother of former mayor Dennis Kucinich.

== Primary election ==
Primary election results
Candidate	Votes	%
George Voinovich (incumbent)	33,364	63.61%
Gary Kucinich	13,385	25.52%
James W. Barrett	5,143	9.81%
Henry Scheer	561	1.07%
Total votes	52,453	

== General election ==
Cleveland mayoral election, 1985
Candidate	Votes	%
George Voinovich (incumbent)	82,840	72.02%
Gary Kucinich	32,185	27.98%
Total votes	115,025	
