= Eric Fingerhut =

American politician (born 1959)

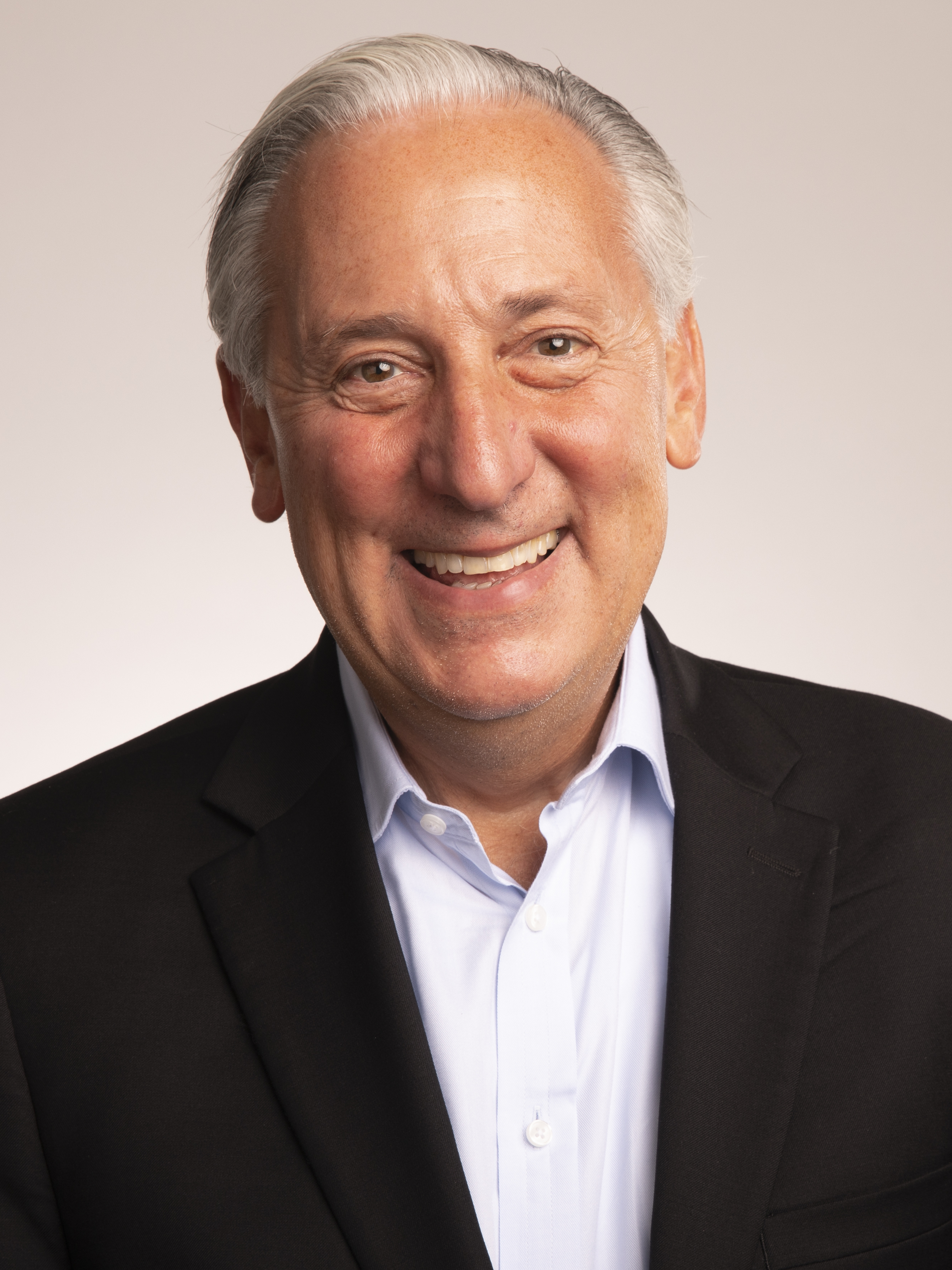
- Fingerhut in 2019

Chancellor of the Ohio Board of Regents
- In office March 14, 2007 – March 14, 2011
- Governor: Ted Strickland; John Kasich
- Preceded by: Roderick Chu
- Succeeded by: Jim Petro

Member of the Ohio Senate from the 25th district
- In office January 5, 1999 – December 31, 2006
- Preceded by: Judy Sheerer
- Succeeded by: Lance Mason
- In office January 3, 1991 – December 12, 1992
- Preceded by: Lee Fisher
- Succeeded by: Judy Sheerer

Member of the U.S. House of Representatives from Ohio's 19th district
- In office January 3, 1993 – January 3, 1995
- Preceded by: Ed Feighan
- Succeeded by: Steve LaTourette

Personal details
- Born: Eric David Fingerhut; May 6, 1959 (age 67) University Heights, Ohio, U.S.
- Party: Democratic
- Spouse: Amy Fingerhut
- Education: Northwestern University (BS); Stanford University (JD)

Eric David Fingerhut (born May 6, 1959) is an American politician, attorney, and academic administrator who is the president and CEO of the Jewish Federations of North America (JFNA). Prior to his appointment at JFNA, he was president and CEO of Hillel International from 2013 to 2019 and the chancellor of the Ohio Board of Regents from 2007 to 2011.

A member of the Democratic Party, Fingerhut served in the Ohio Senate from 1991 to 1992, and again from 1999 to 2006. He represented Ohio's 19th congressional district in the U.S. House of Representatives from 1993 to 1995 and was the Democratic nominee in the 2004 United States Senate election in Ohio, losing to incumbent George Voinovich.

== Early life and education ==
Fingerhut was born May 6, 1959, in the Cleveland suburb of University Heights, Ohio. He grew up in University Heights and nearby Cleveland Heights, and graduated from Cleveland Heights High School in 1977. He earned a Bachelor of Science degree from Northwestern University in 1981 and a Juris Doctor from Stanford Law School in 1984.

== Career ==
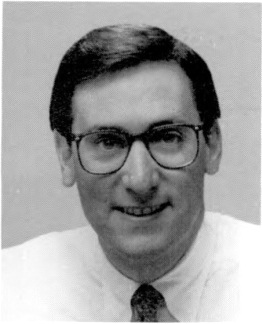
Fingerhut during the 103rd Congress

Fingerhut began his career in public service and community development, serving as associate director of Cleveland Works from 1987 to 1989. He later worked as campaign manager and transition director for Cleveland Mayor Michael R. White.

Fingerhut was elected to the Ohio Senate in 1990 and served from 1991 to 1993. In 1992, he was elected to represent Ohio's 19th congressional district in the 103rd United States Congress. He sought reelection in 1994 but was unsuccessful in his bid for a second term. Fingerhut then returned to the Ohio Senate and served from 1999 to 2006.

Fingerhut unsuccessfully challenged incumbent Republican U.S. Senator George Voinovich in the 2004 United States Senate election in Ohio. A popular senator, Voinovich was the heavy favorite to win the election virtually from the start. Fingerhut tried to draw attention to his candidacy by walking over 300 miles across the state and meeting with voters. However, he still faced long odds, with many Democratic officials ignoring his campaign and voters not believing in his chances. He garnered 36 percent of the vote in the general election.

Fingerhut was appointed Chancellor of the Ohio Board of Regents on March 14, 2007, by Governor Ted Strickland. The position made Fingerhut a member of the Ohio Governor's Cabinet and gave him oversight of the University System of Ohio. On February 22, 2011, he submitted his resignation to Governor John Kasich, effective March 14, 2011, after serving four years of his five-year term. He later worked as vice president of education and STEM learning at Battelle Memorial Institute.

Very quickly after beginning his tenure as CEO of Hillel International, the organization experienced a major controversy. The Hillel chapter at Swarthmore College declared itself an "Open Hillel", choosing to welcome all guest speakers and student organizations, whether or not they support Zionism. Fingerhut responded, stating "Let me be very clear – 'anti-Zionists' will not be permitted to speak using the Hillel name or under the Hillel roof, under any circumstances."

Beginning in 2015, Fingerhut became involved in a dispute with J Street U after withdrawing from an appearance at the group's national conference, citing concerns about sharing a platform with speakers who had made what he described as inflammatory statements about Israel. Critics argued that the decision risked alienating a significant segment of engaged Jewish students and suggested donor pressure may have played a role. In response, hundreds of J Street U members protested at Hillel International's headquarters and accused Fingerhut of favoring conservative donors over student voices. Fingerhut subsequently met with student leaders and acknowledged the deep divisions within the Jewish community, pledging to foster greater dialogue and mutual respect across differing viewpoints.

== See also ==
- List of United States representatives from Ohio
- List of Jewish members of the United States Congress

U.S. House of Representatives
Preceded by Ed Feighan	Member of the U.S. House of Representatives from Ohio's 19th congressional district 1993–1995	Succeeded by Steve LaTourette
Party political offices
Preceded by Mary Boyle	Democratic nominee for U.S. Senator from Ohio (Class 3); 2004	Succeeded by Lee Fisher
U.S. order of precedence (ceremonial)
Preceded by Charlie Luken as Former U.S. Representative	Order of precedence of the United States as Former US Representative	Succeeded by David S. Mann as Former U.S. Representative
