= 2004 United States Senate election in Ohio =

- November 2, 2004
- Turnout: 71.77% (registered voters) ▲21.96pp
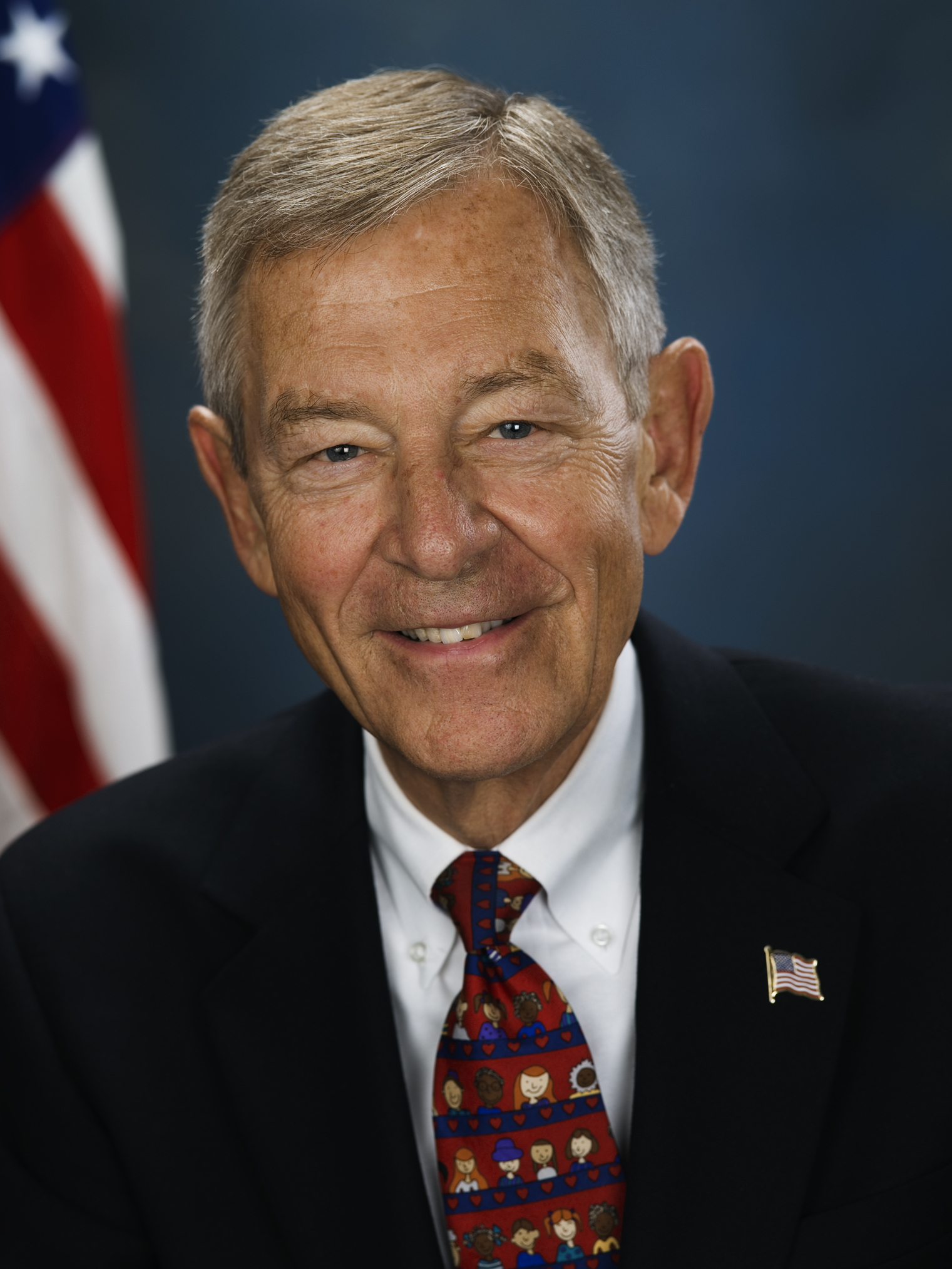

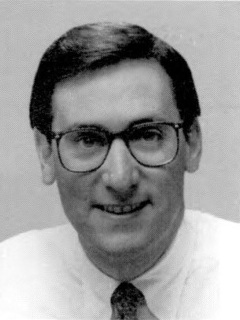
Nominee	George Voinovich	Eric Fingerhut
Party	Republican	Democratic
Popular vote	3,464,651	1,961,249
Percentage	63.85%	36.14%
- Voinovich: 50–60% 60–70% 70–80% 80–90% Fingerhut: 60–70%
U.S. senator before election
George Voinovich
Republican
Elected U.S. Senator
George Voinovich
Republican

The 2004 United States Senate election in Ohio took place on November 2, 2004. It was concurrent with elections to the United States House of Representatives and the presidential election. Incumbent Republican U.S. Senator George Voinovich won re-election to a second term with the highest raw vote total in Ohio history. This remains the last Ohio statewide election to date in which a candidate won every county in the state. This was the first time since 1950 that an incumbent Republican Senator was re-elected to this seat.

== Republican primary ==
=== Candidates ===
- John Mitchel, retired United States Air Force lieutenant colonel and perennial candidate
- George Voinovich, incumbent U.S. Senator since 1999

=== Results ===
Republican primary
Party	Candidate	Votes	%
Republican	George Voinovich (Incumbent)	640,082	76.61%
Republican	John Mitchel	195,476	23.39%
Total votes		835,558	100.00%

== Democratic primary ==
=== Candidates ===
- Norbert Dennerll, former member of the Cleveland city council
- Eric Fingerhut, state senator and former U.S. representative from Mayfield Heights

==== Declined ====
- Jerry Springer, host of The Jerry Springer Show and former mayor of Cincinnati

=== Campaign ===
The early story of the campaign surrounded speculation of whether Jerry Springer would enter the race. Springer, a former mayor of Cincinnati, had previously considered a challenge to the state's other Senator Mike DeWine in 2000, but ultimately passed on it. Among the steps Springer took, included filing papers to run traveling across the state to meet voters, and airing a nationwide 30 minute infomercial for the purpose of fundraising. The infomercial would not be seen in Ohio due to equal time laws. Ultimately, Springer declined a return to public office, citing his inability to distance himself from his infamous talk show's reputation. He also cited his show's contract as playing a role. In all, Springer spent a little over $1 million of his own money on his exploratory campaign.

Had he run, Springer would have faced obstacles, as polling showed that as much as 71% of voters polled held an unfavorable view of him. That same poll also showed that in a prospective contest, Voinovich lead with 77% of the vote to Springer's 16%. After his brief exploration, Springer hinted that in 2006, he would be interested in the open governorship and declined to rule out a Senate bid that year. Ultimately, he would pursue neither bid.

After Springer declined to enter, Fingerhut was seen as the favorite to win the nomination. He only faced token opposition from Norbert Dennerll, a former City Councilman who served in the late 50's and early 60's.

=== Results ===
Democratic primary
Party	Candidate	Votes	%
Democratic	Eric Fingerhut	672,989	70.79%
Democratic	Norbert Dennerll	277,721	29.21%
Total votes		950,710	100.00%

== General election ==
=== Candidates ===
- Eric Fingerhut, state senator and former U.S. representative from Mayfield Heights (Democratic)
- Helen Meyers (write-in)
- George Voinovich, incumbent senator since 1999 and former governor (Republican)

=== Campaign ===
A popular U.S. Senator, Voinovich was the heavy favorite to win the election virtually from the start. He had over $9 million in the bank, while his opponent barely had $1.5 million. Fingerhut tried to draw attention to his candidacy by walking over 300 miles across the state and meeting with voters. However, he still faced long odds, with many Democratic officials ignoring his campaign and voters not believing in his chances.

Voinovich's biggest advantage was getting support from the most Democratic-leaning county in the state, Cuyahoga County, Ohio. Kerry carried it with almost 67% of the vote, by far his best performance in the state in 2004. It is the home of Cleveland and it is also most populous county in the state. Voinovich was a former mayor of Cleveland. In addition, he catered to Cleveland's large Jewish population by visiting Israel six times as a first-term U.S. Senator. He also consistently voted for aid to Israel through foreign appropriations bills. He's supported resolutions reaffirming Israel's right to self-defense and condemned Palestinian terrorist attacks. In addition, Fingerhut's home base was in the Cleveland area, and therefore he had to cut in through the incumbent's home base in order to even make the election close.

In a September University of Cincinnati poll, the incumbent led 64% to 34%. In an October ABC News poll, Voinovich was winning 60% to 35%. He led across almost all demographic groups. Only Democrats, non-whites, liberals, and those who pick health care as their #1 issue favor Fingerhut. The election coincided with the presidential election, where Ohio was a swing state. 27% of Voinovich's supporters preferred U.S. Senator John Kerry for president.

=== Predictions ===
Source	Ranking	As of
Sabato's Crystal Ball	Safe R	November 1, 2004

=== Polling ===
Poll source	Date(s) administered	Sample size (Note: Key: A – all adults RV – registered voters LV – likely voters V – unclear)	Margin of error	George Voinovich (R)	Eric Fingerhut (D)	Other / Undecided
SurveyUSA	October 29–31, 2004	813 (LV)	± 3.5%	61%	33%	5%

=== Results ===
2004 United States Senate election, Ohio
Party	Candidate	Votes	%
Republican	George Voinovich (Incumbent)	3,464,651	63.85%
Democratic	Eric Fingerhut	1,961,249	36.14%
Independent	Helen Meyers (write-in)	296	0.01%
Turnout		5,426,196	100.00%
Republican hold			

==== Counties that flipped from Democratic to Republican ====
- Monroe (Largest city: Woodsfield)
- Cuyahoga (Largest city: Cleveland)
- Mahoning (Largest city: Youngstown)
- Trumbull (Largest city: Warren)
- Summit (Largest city: Akron)
- Lorain (largest municipality: Lorain)
- Portage (largest city: Kent)
- Belmont (largest city: Martins Ferry)
- Jefferson (largest city: Steubenville)
- Harrison (Largest city: Cadiz)
- Perry (Largest city: New Lexington)
- Pike (Largest city: Waverly)
- Athens (Largest city: Athens)

=== By congressional district ===
Voinovich won 17 of 18 congressional districts, including 6 that have Democratic congressman and 5 that voted for John Kerry in the presidential race.

District	Voinovich	Fingerhut	Representative
1st	60%	40%	Steve Chabot
2nd	72%	28%	Rob Portman
2nd	72%	28%	Jean Schmidt
3rd	66%	34%	Mike Turner
4th	73%	27%	Mike Oxley
5th	72%	28%	Paul Gillmor
6th	62%	38%	Ted Strickland
7th	69%	31%	David Hobson
8th	73%	27%	John Boehner
9th	58%	42%	Marcy Kaptur
10th	61%	39%	Dennis Kucinich
11th	39%	61%	Stephanie Tubbs Jones
12th	65%	35%	Pat Tiberi
13th	59%	41%	Sherrod Brown
14th	66%	34%	Steven LaTourette
15th	63%	37%	Deborah Pryce
16th	67%	33%	Ralph Regula
17th	51%	49%	Tim Ryan
18th	68%	32%	Bob Ney

== See also ==
- 2004 United States Senate elections
