= List of mayors of Marietta, Ohio =

List of Mayors and chairman of town meeting of Marietta, Ohio

This is a list of mayors of the city of Marietta. Prior to the mayoral position the position of leadership was Chairman of the Town Meeting.

List of the Chairman of the Town Meeting
#	Term	Chairman of the Town Meeting
1	1801–1803	Rufus Putnam
2	1804–1807	Dudley Woodbridge
3	1808	Edwin Putnam
4	1809	Paul Fearing
5	1810	Seth Washburn
6	1811–1813	Icabod Nye
7	1814	Caleb Emerson
8	1815	John Brough
9	1816	Caleb Emerson
10	1817–1818	James Sharp
11	1819	Caleb Emerson
12	1820–1821	Icabod Nye
13	1822	John Clark
14	1825	Daniel H. Buell

List of the Mayors of Marietta
#	Term	Mayor	Party affiliation
1	1826–1830	James M. Booth	
2	1831–1832	James Dunn	
3	1833–1835	Nahum Ward	
4	1836–1841	Anselm T. Nye	
5	1842–1843	Daniel H. Buell	
6	1843–1848	Louis Soyez	
7	1849	Anselm T. Nye	
8	1850	Louis Soyez	
9	1851–1853	James Dunn	
10	1854–1855	Daniel Protsman	
11	1856–1857	William A. Whittlesey	
12	1858–1859	Ethan H. Allen	
13	1860–1863	William A. Whittlesey	
14	1864–1867	Samuel S. Knowles-	
15	1868–1871	Frederick A. Wheeler	
16	1872–1873	John V. Ramsey	
17	1874–1877	Jewett Palmer	
18	1878–1879	William Glines	
19	1880–1881	Rufus E. Harte	
20	1882–1883	Charles W. Richards	
21	1884–1887	Sidney Ridgeway	
22	1888–1889	Josiah Coulter	
23	1890–1893	Charles Richardson	
24	1894–1895	Jewett Palmer	
25	1896–1897	Edward Meisenhelder	
26	1898–1899	Charles Richardson	
27	1900-1901	E. Sykes	
28	1902-1903	Oscar W. Lambert	
29	1904-1905	O. P. Hyde	
30	1906-1913	Charles F. Leeper	
31	1914-1915	David Okey	
32	1916-1917	Val. B. Hovey	
33	1918-1919	A. A. Crawford	
34	1920-1921	William M. Sprague	
35	1922-1923	G. B. H. Sanford	
36	1924-1925	William M. Sprague	
37	1926-1929	John W. Gray	
38	1930-1933	F. A. Steadman	
39	1934-1937	J. Morton Harper	
40	1938-1939	P. W. Griffiths	
41	1940-1947	Earl D. Schob	Democrat
42	1948-1952	Joe C. Hartline	Republican
43	1952-1953	Gerald E. Broughton	Republican
44	1954-1955	Benjamin B. Cain	Republican
45	1956-1957	Forester Farley	Democrat
46	1958-1965	Don L. Curtis	Republican
47	1965-1965	Ralph E. Gearhart	Republican
48	1966-1971	John A. Burnworth	Democrat
49	1972-1975	James F. Schweikert	Republican
50	1976-1979	Geoffrey D. Brunton	Democrat
51	1980-1983	George F. Cranston	Republican
52	1984-1991	Nancy Putnam Hollister	Republican
53	1991-1991	Brooks Harper	Republican
54	1992-2003	Joe A. Matthews	Democrat
55	2004-2011	Michael Mullen	Democrat
56	2012-2020	Joe A. Matthews	Democrat
57	2020-	Josh Schlicher	Republican
