= 1994 Ohio gubernatorial election =

- November 8, 1994
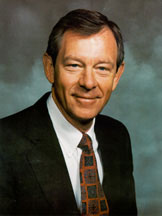

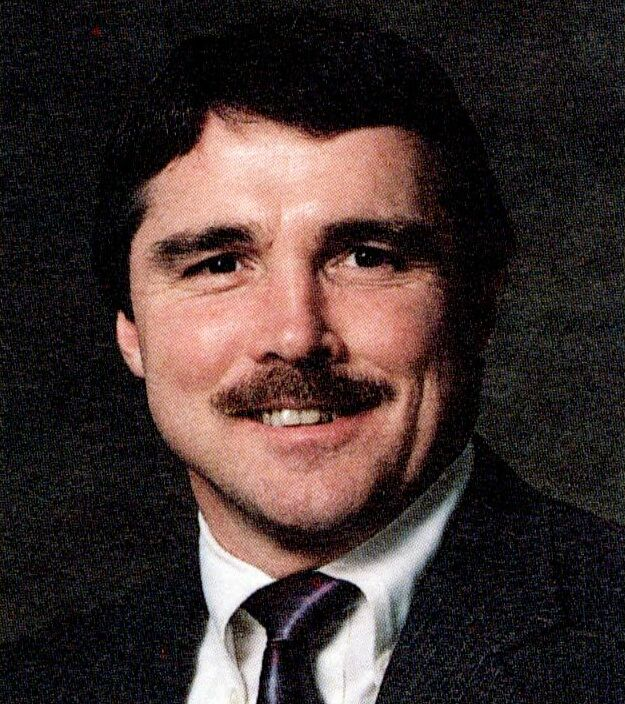
Nominee	George Voinovich	Rob Burch
Party	Republican	Democratic
Running mate	Nancy Hollister	Peter Lawson Jones
Popular vote	2,401,572	835,849
Percentage	71.77%	24.98%
- Voinovich: 50–60% 60–70% 70–80% 80–90% >90% Burch: 50–60% 60–70% 70–80%
Governor before election
George Voinovich
Republican
Elected Governor
George Voinovich
Republican

The 1994 Ohio gubernatorial election took place on November 8, 1994. Incumbent Republican Governor of Ohio George Voinovich ran for a second term. Voinovich won his party's nomination uncontested and was opposed by State Senator Rob Burch, who won a competitive Democratic primary. Ultimately, Voinovich capitalized on his massive popularity within Ohio and won re-election in an overwhelming landslide, defeating Burch and winning almost 72% of the vote. As of 2024, this was the last time Athens County voted for the Republican candidate.

== Democratic primary ==
=== Candidates ===
- Rob Burch, Ohio State Senator
- Peter Michael Schuller, philosophy professor and former congressional candidate

=== Results ===
Democratic primary results
Party	Candidate	Votes	%
Democratic	Rob Burch	408,161	58.78
Democratic	Peter Michael Schuller	286,276	41.22
Total votes		694,437	100.00

== Republican primary ==
=== Candidates ===
- George Voinovich, incumbent Governor of Ohio

=== Results ===
Republican primary results
Party	Candidate	Votes	%
Republican	George Voinovich (inc.)	750,781	100.00
Total votes		750,781	100.00

== General election ==
=== Results ===
Ohio gubernatorial election, 1994
Party	Candidate	Votes	%	±%
Republican	George Voinovich (inc.)	2,401,572	71.77%	+16.04%
Democratic	Rob Burch	835,849	24.98%	−19.29%
Independent	Billy R. Inmon	108,745	3.25%	
Write-ins		72	0.00%	
Majority		1,565,723	46.79%	+35.33%
Turnout		3,346,238		
Republican hold		Swing		
