= Arthur Brooks (politician) =

American politician (1936–2021)

Member of the Ohio House of Representatives from the 14th district
- In office January 3, 1975 – December 31, 1978
- Preceded by: John Sweeney
- Succeeded by: Mary Boyle

Personal details
- Born: May 8, 1936
- Died: July 6, 2021 (aged 85)
- Party: Democratic

Arthur V. N. Brooks (May 8, 1936 – July 6, 2021) was a member of the Ohio House of Representatives. He died on July 6, 2021.
