= 1994 Ohio State Treasurer election =

- November 8, 1994
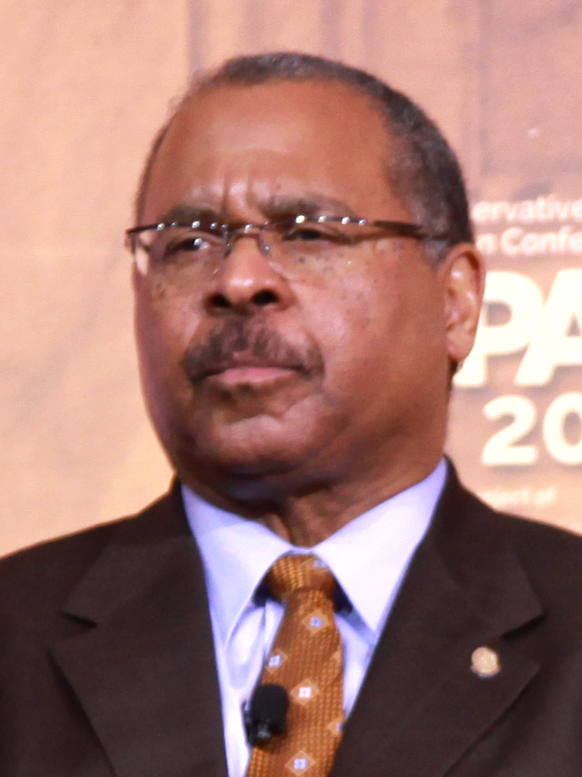

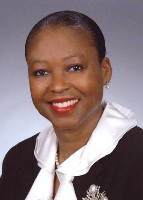
Nominee	Ken Blackwell	Barbara Sykes
Party	Republican	Democratic
Popular vote	1,740,710	1,370,737
Percentage	53.74%	42.32%
- County results Blackwell: 40–50% 50–60% 60–70% 70–80% Sykes: 40–50% 50–60% 60–70%
Ohio State Treasurer before election
Ken Blackwell
Republican
Elected Ohio State Treasurer
Ken Blackwell
Republican

The 1994 Ohio State Treasurer election was held on November 8, 1994, to elect the Ohio State Treasurer. Primaries were held on May 3, 1994.

Republican incumbent Ohio State Treasurer Ken Blackwell, who was appointed following Democrat Mary Ellen Withrow's resignation after being nominated to Treasurer of the United States, won election to a full term, defeating the Democratic nominee Akron City Council member Barbara Sykes by eleven percentage points.

== Republican primary ==
=== Candidates ===
- Ken Blackwell, incumbent Ohio State Treasurer (1994–1999)

=== Campaign ===
Blackwell won the Republican nomination unopposed.

=== Results ===
Republican primary results
Party	Candidate	Votes	%
Republican	Ken Blackwell	610,594	100%
Total votes		610,594	100.00%

== Democratic primary ==
=== Candidates ===
- Barbara Sykes, Akron City Council member
- George McKelvey, Mahoning County Treasurer

=== Campaign ===
Sykes easily won the Democratic nomination over McKelvey, winning with 62.74% of the vote.

=== Results ===
Democratic primary results
Party	Candidate	Votes	%
Democratic	Barbara Sykes	495,632	62.74%
Democratic	George McKelvey	294,361	37.26%
Total votes		789,993	100.00%

== General election ==
=== Candidates ===
- Ken Blackwell, incumbent Ohio State Treasurer (1994–1999) (Republican)
- Barbara Sykes, Akron City Council member (Democratic)
- Edward Licht (Independent)

=== Results ===
1994 Ohio State Treasurer election results
Party	Candidate	Votes	%	±%
Republican	Ken Blackwell	1,740,710	53.74%	+13.21%
Democratic	Barbara Sykes	1,370,737	42.32%	−17.15%
Independent	Edward Licht	127,670	3.94%	N/A
Total votes		3,239,117	100.00%	
Republican hold				
