= United States Senate Environment and Public Works Subcommittee on Green Jobs and the New Economy =

The U.S. Senate Environment and Public Works Subcommittee on Green Jobs and the New Economy was a subcommittee of the U.S. Senate Committee on Environment and Public Works.

== Jurisdiction ==
According to the committee's website:

Responsibility for issues related to job creation through the development and deployment of “green” technologies and practices. Issues also include federal investment in technologies and practices that reduce the government’s carbon footprint or the emission of other pollutants, including technologies and practices that enhance energy efficiency, conservation, or renewable power sources.

== Members, 114th Congress ==
Majority	Minority
Dan Sullivan, Alaska Chairman; Roger Wicker, Mississippi; Jeff Sessions, Alabama	Jeff Merkley, Oregon, Ranking Member; Tom Carper, Delaware; Bernie Sanders, Vermont
Ex officio
Jim Inhofe, Oklahoma	Barbara Boxer, California
