= 1998 United States Senate election in Ohio =

- November 3, 1998
- Turnout: 49.81% (registered voters) ▼
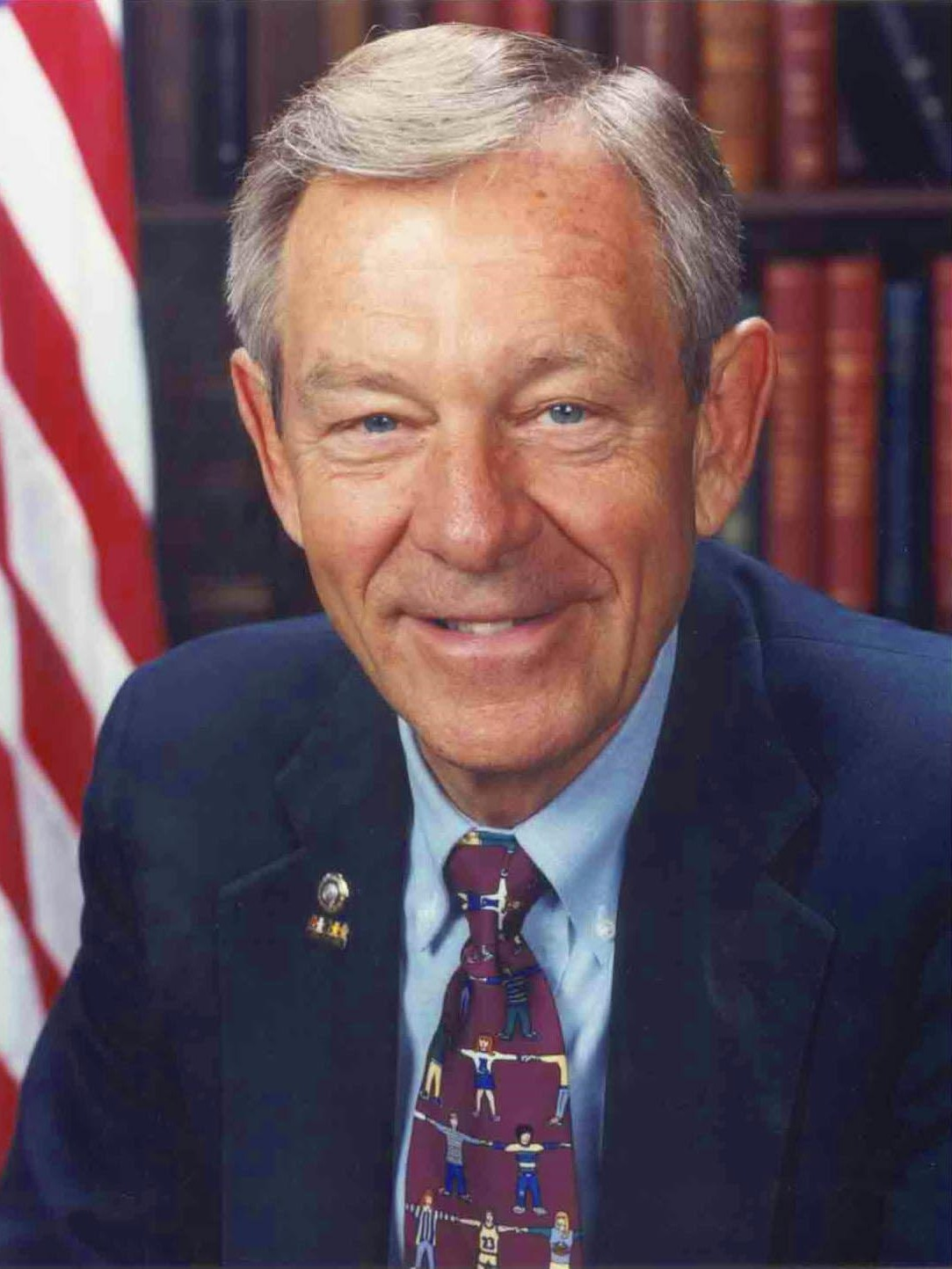

Nominee	George Voinovich	Mary Boyle
Party	Republican	Democratic
Popular vote	1,922,087	1,482,054
Percentage	56.46%	43.54%
- County results Voinovich: 50–60% 60–70% 70–80% Boyle: 50–60% 60–70%
U.S. senator before election
John Glenn
Democratic
Elected U.S. Senator
George Voinovich
Republican

The 1998 United States Senate election in Ohio was held November 3, 1998. It was concurrent with elections to the United States House of Representatives. Incumbent Democratic U.S Senator John Glenn decided to retire, instead of seeking a fifth term. Republican Governor George Voinovich won the open seat. This was the first open-seat Senate election in Ohio for this seat since 1920.

== General election ==
=== Candidates ===
- Mary Boyle, former Cuyahoga County commissioner and candidate for U.S. Senate in 1994 (Democratic)
- George Voinovich, incumbent governor of Ohio and nominee in 1988 (Republican)

=== Polling ===
Poll source	Date(s)	Sample size (Note: Key: A – all adults RV – registered voters LV – likely voters V – unclear)	Margin of error	George Voinovich (R)	Mary Boyle (D)	Other / undecided (Note: Calculated by taking the difference of 100% and all other candidates combined.)
Harris Insights & Analytics	October 30, 1998	2,149	—	58%	39%	3%
Columbus Dispatch	October 27, 1998	800	—	51%	49%	0%
Mason-Dixon Polling & Strategy	October 25–27, 1998	815 (LV)	± 3.5%	55%	37%	8%
University of Cincinnati	October 26, 1998	1,196	—	62%	38%	0%
University of Cincinnati	October 22–26, 1998	754 (LV)	± 3.6%	62%	34%	4%
Harris Insights & Analytics	October 20, 1998	1,793	—	55%	37%	8%
Gordon S. Black Corp.	October 18, 1998	1,012	—	51%	28%	21%
University of Cincinnati	October 8–18, 1998	540 (LV)	± 4.2%	62%	34%	4%
University of Cincinnati	October 2–7, 1998	405 (LV)	± 5.0%	58%	35%	7%
Mason-Dixon Polling & Strategy	October 2–5, 1998	805 (LV)	± 3.5%	54%	35%	11%
University of Cincinnati	September 8–20, 1998	921 (LV)	± 4.3%	62%	31%	7%
Mason-Dixon Polling & Strategy	September 12–14, 1998	817 (LV)	± 3.5%	56%	28%	16%
Gordon S. Black Corp.	September 10–14, 1998	1,005 (LV)	± 3.0%	46%	28%	26%
University of Cincinnati	May 13–27, 1998	560 (RV)	± 4.0%	57%	34%	9%
Mason-Dixon Polling & Strategy	April 26–28, 1998	808 (LV)	± 3.5%	51%	26%	23%
Columbus Dispatch (Note: Poll sponsored by The Columbus Dispatch, Ohio State University, & WBNS-TV)	April 12–23, 1998	830 (A)	± 3.5%	52%	29%	19%

=== Results ===
1998 United States Senate election in Ohio
Party	Candidate	Votes	%	±%
Republican	George Voinovich	1,922,087	56.46%	+14.15%
Democratic	Mary Boyle	1,482,054	43.54%	−7.45%
Majority		440,033	12.92%	
Turnout		3,404,141	49.81%	
Republican gain from Democratic		Swing		

== See also ==
- 1998 United States Senate elections

== Notes ==
Partisan clients
