= Mary O. Boyle =

American politician (born 1941)

Mary Boyle

Majority Whip of the Ohio House of Representatives
- In office 1982 – December 31, 1984
- Preceded by: Francine Panehal
- Succeeded by: Patrick Sweeney

Member of the Ohio House of Representatives from the 15th district
- In office January 3, 1979 – December 31, 1984
- Preceded by: Arthur Brooks
- Succeeded by: Jane Campbell

Personal details
- Born: December 23, 1941 (age 84) Cleveland, Ohio, U.S.
- Party: Democratic
- Education: Saint Mary's College (BA)

Mary O. Boyle (born December 23, 1941) is an American politician who was a member of the Ohio House of Representatives from 1979 to 1984. A member of the Democratic Party, she was the party's nominee in the 1998 United States Senate election in Ohio.

Boyle started her career in elective office as a state legislator representing Cleveland Heights (Ohio District 9) in 1978. She was elected majority whip in 1982. After leaving the legislature, she served as a Cuyahoga County commissioner for twelve years. She was the first woman ever elected to a non-judicial county office in Cuyahoga County. Boyle entered the Democratic primary for the United States Senate in 1994 to replace the retiring Howard Metzenbaum, but was defeated by Joel Hyatt.

In 1998, Boyle chose to run for the Senate again to replace the retiring John Glenn, declining those who sought her entry to run for Ohio Secretary of State. She won the Democratic nomination and became the first woman nominated by a major party for the U.S. Senate from Ohio. In the general election, Boyle was defeated by Governor George Voinovich. Her campaign focused on Voinovich's record as governor and her experience as a mother of four, but lacked sufficient fundraising.

Boyle also unsuccessfully ran for Ohio state treasurer in 2002 against Joe Deters.

Ohio House of Representatives
Preceded by Arthur Brooks	Member of the Ohio House of Representatives from the 15th district January 3, 1979 – December 31, 1984	Succeeded by Jane Campbell
Party political offices
Preceded by John Glenn	Democratic nominee for U.S. Senator from Ohio (Class 3); 1998	Succeeded by Eric Fingerhut
Preceded by John A. Donofrio	Democratic nominee for Treasurer of Ohio; 2002	Succeeded by Richard Cordray
