= 1936 United States Senate elections =

- November 3, 1936
- Class 2

32 of the 96 seats in the United States Senate 49 seats needed for a majority
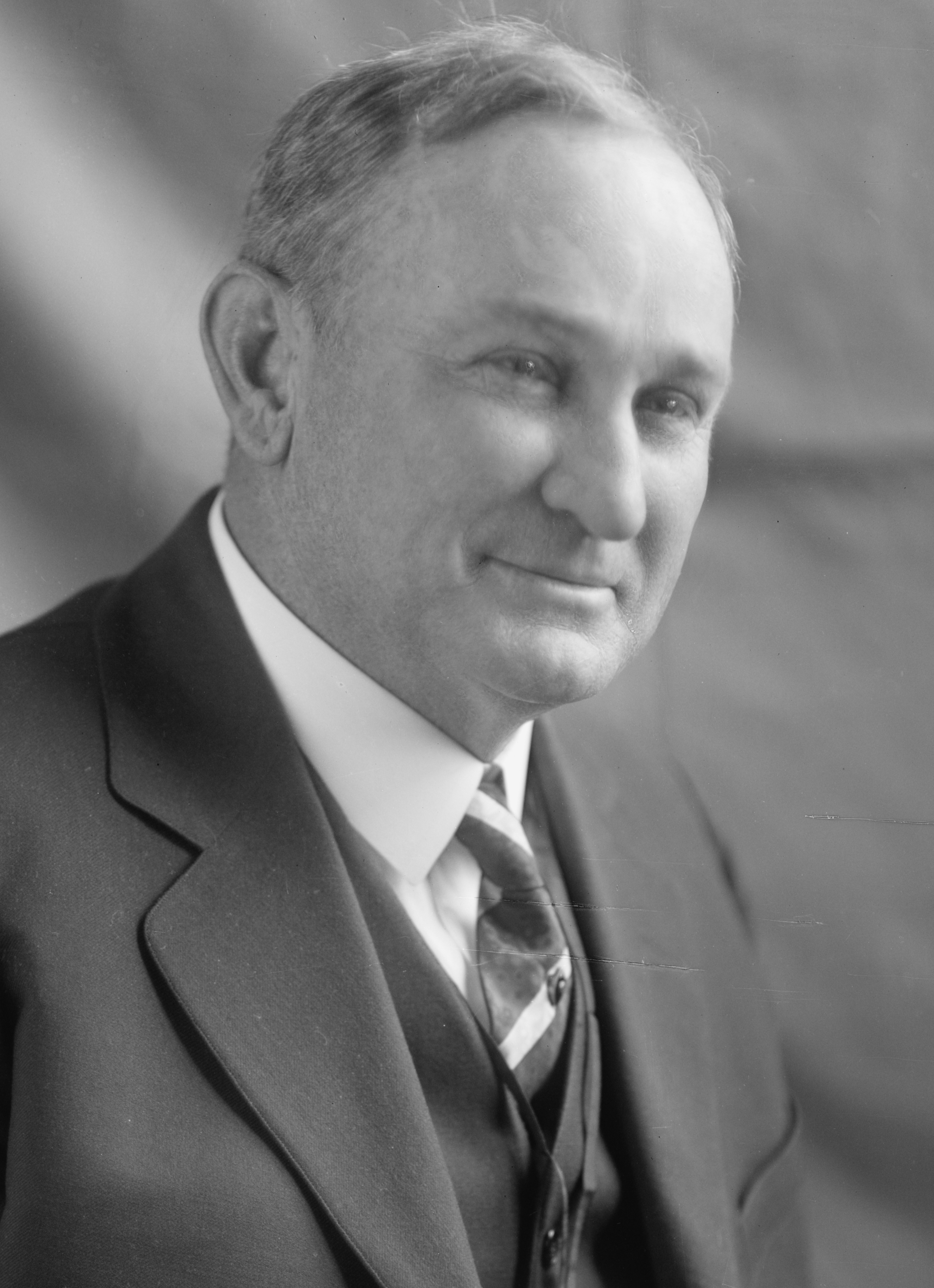

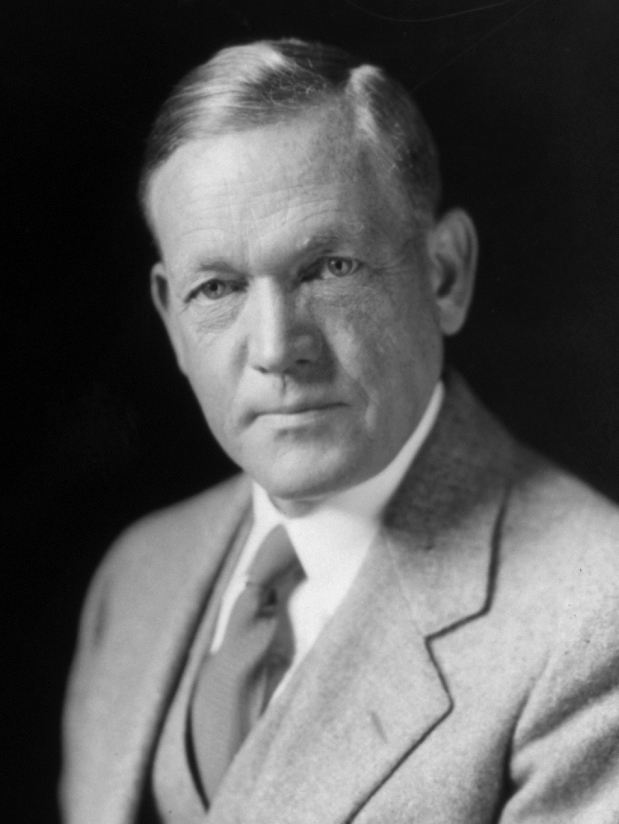
	Majority party	Minority party
Leader	Joseph Robinson	Charles McNary
Party	Democratic	Republican
Leader since	December 3, 1923	March 4, 1933
Leader's seat	Arkansas	Oregon
Seats before	70	23
Seats after	75	17
Seat change	▲5	▼6
Seats up	19	11
Races won	24	6
	Third party	Fourth party
Party	Farmer–Labor	Progressive
Seats before	2	1
Seats after	2	1
Seat change	Steady	Steady
Seats up	1	0
Races won	1	0
	Fifth party
Party	Independent
Seats before	0
Seats after	1
Seat change	▲1
Seats up	0
Races won	1
- Results of the elections: Democratic gain Democratic hold Republican gain Republican hold Farmer–Labor hold Independent gain No election
Majority Leader before election
Joseph Robinson
Democratic
Elected Majority Leader
Joseph Robinson
Democratic

The 1936 United States Senate elections coincided with the reelection of President Franklin D. Roosevelt. The 32 seats of Class 2 were contested in regular elections, and special elections were held to fill vacancies. The Great Depression continued and voters backed progressive candidates favoring Roosevelt's New Deal in races across the country. The Democrats gained 5 net seats during the election, and in combination with Democratic and Farmer–Labor interim appointments and the defection of George W. Norris from the Republican Party to become independent, the Republicans were reduced to 16 seats. The Democrats gained a further two seats due to midterm vacancies. The Democrats' 77 seats and their 62-seat majority remain their largest in history.

This was the last of four consecutive election cycles where Republicans suffered losses due to the ongoing effects of the Great Depression. This also marked the last Senate election cycle until 2012 in which a Democratic presidential candidate who won two consecutive terms also led their party to net gains in both election cycles. (Note: Although Roosevelt won a third term and fourth term, he lost Senate seats on both occasions.) Additionally, this is the last time any party held three-fourths of all Senate seats. In contrast, this was the first time since 1930 (which also involved the Class 2 seats) where the Republicans were able to flip a Senate seat despite suffering net losses during this period.

== Gains, losses, and holds ==
=== Retirements ===
One Republican, one Farmer-Labor, and five Democrats retired instead of seeking re-election.

State	Senator	Replaced by
Colorado	Edward P. Costigan	Edwin C. Johnson
Florida (special, class 1)	Scott Loftin	Charles O. Andrews
Florida (special, class 3)	William Luther Hill	Claude Pepper
Louisiana	Rose McConnell Long	Allen J. Ellender
Massachusetts	Marcus A. Coolidge	Henry Cabot Lodge Jr.
Minnesota (special)	Elmer A. Benson	Guy V. Howard
Minnesota	Elmer A. Benson	Ernest Lundeen
New Hampshire	Henry W. Keyes	Styles Bridges

=== Defeats ===
Six Republicans and one Democrat sought re-election but lost in the primary or general election.

State	Senator	Replaced by
Delaware	Daniel O. Hastings	James H. Hughes
Iowa	L. J. Dickinson	Clyde L. Herring
Michigan	James Couzens	Prentiss M. Brown
New Jersey	W. Warren Barbour	William H. Smathers
Oklahoma	Thomas Gore	Joshua B. Lee
Rhode Island	Jesse H. Metcalf	Theodore F. Green
Wyoming	Robert D. Carey	Harry Schwartz

=== Death ===
One Democrat died on July 16, 1936, and his seat remained vacant until the election.

State	Senator	Replaced by
Iowa (special)	Louis Murphy	Guy Gillette

=== Independent gain ===
One Republican won re-election as an independent.

State	Senator	Replaced by
Nebraska	George W. Norris	George W. Norris

=== Post-election changes ===
State	Senator	Replaced by
Alabama	Hugo Black	Dixie Bibb Graves
Arkansas	Joseph Taylor Robinson	John E. Miller
New Jersey	A. Harry Moore	John Gerald Milton
New York	Royal S. Copeland	James M. Mead
Oregon	Frederick Steiwer	Alfred E. Reames
Tennessee	Nathan L. Bachman	George L. Berry

== Change in composition ==
=== Before the elections ===
After the April 1936 special election.

		D_{1}	D_{2}	D_{3}	D_{4}	D_{5}	D_{6}	D_{7}	D_{8}
D_{18}	D_{17}	D_{16}	D_{15}	D_{14}	D_{13}	D_{12}	D_{11}	D_{10}	D_{9}
D_{19}	D_{20}	D_{21}	D_{22}	D_{23}	D_{24}	D_{25}	D_{26}	D_{27}	D_{28}
D_{38}	D_{37}	D_{36}	D_{35}	D_{34}	D_{33}	D_{32}	D_{31}	D_{30}	D_{29}
D_{39}	D_{40}	D_{41}	D_{42}	D_{43}	D_{44}	D_{45}	D_{46}	D_{47}	D_{48} Ala. Ran
Majority →									D_{49} Ark. Ran
D_{58} Miss. Ran	D_{57} Mass. Retired	D_{56} La. (sp); Elected (Note: Appointee elected); La. (reg); Retired	D_{55} Ky. Ran	D_{54} Ill. Ran	D_{53} Ga. Ran	D_{52} Fla. (sp3); Retired	D_{51} Fla. (sp1); Retired	D_{50} Colo. Retired	D_{49} Ark. Ran
D_{59} Mont. Ran	D_{60} N.M. (reg); Ran	D_{61} N.M. (sp); Ran	D_{62} N.C. Ran	D_{63} Okla. Ran	D_{64} S.C. Ran	D_{65} S.D. Ran	D_{66} Tenn. Ran	D_{67} Texas; Ran	D_{68} Va. Ran
R_{19} N.H. Retired	R_{20} N.J. Ran	R_{21} Ore. Ran	R_{22} R.I. Ran	R_{23} Wyo. Ran	FL_{1}	FL_{2} Minn. (sp); Minn. (reg); Retired	P_{1}	V_{1} Iowa (sp)	D_{69} W.Va. Ran
R_{18} Neb. Ran	R_{17} Mich. Ran	R_{16} Maine; Ran	R_{15} Kan. Ran	R_{14} Iowa; Ran	R_{13} Idaho; Ran	R_{12} Del. Ran	R_{11}	R_{10}	R_{9}
		R_{1}	R_{2}	R_{3}	R_{4}	R_{5}	R_{6}	R_{7}	R_{8}

=== Result of the elections ===
		D_{1}	D_{2}	D_{3}	D_{4}	D_{5}	D_{6}	D_{7}	D_{8}
D_{18}	D_{17}	D_{16}	D_{15}	D_{14}	D_{13}	D_{12}	D_{11}	D_{10}	D_{9}
D_{19}	D_{20}	D_{21}	D_{22}	D_{23}	D_{24}	D_{25}	D_{26}	D_{27}	D_{28}
D_{38}	D_{37}	D_{36}	D_{35}	D_{34}	D_{33}	D_{32}	D_{31}	D_{30}	D_{29}
D_{39}	D_{40}	D_{41}	D_{42}	D_{43}	D_{44}	D_{45}	D_{46}	D_{47}	D_{48} Ala. Re-elected
Majority →									D_{49} Ark. Re-elected
D_{58} Mont. Re-elected	D_{57} Miss. Re-elected	D_{56} La. (reg); Hold	D_{55} Ky. Re-elected	D_{54} Ill. Re-elected	D_{53} Ga. Re-elected	D_{52} Fla. (sp3); Hold	D_{51} Fla. (sp1); Hold	D_{50} Colo. Hold	D_{49} Ark. Re-elected
D_{59} N.M. (reg); Re-elected	D_{60} N.M. (sp); Elected	D_{61} N.C. Re-elected	D_{62} Okla. Hold	D_{63} S.C. Re-elected	D_{64} S.D. Re-elected	D_{65} Tenn. Re-elected	D_{66} Texas; Re-elected	D_{67} Va. Re-elected	D_{68} W.Va. Re-elected
FL_{1}	FL_{2} Minn. (sp); Gain (Note: The Republican candidate was elected to finish the term, but the Farmer-Labor candidate was elected to the next term.) Minn. (reg); Hold	P_{1}	D_{75} Wyo. Gain	D_{74} R.I. Gain	D_{73} N.J. Gain	D_{72} Mich. Gain	D_{71} Iowa (sp); Hold	D_{70} Iowa (reg); Gain	D_{69} Del. Gain
I_{1} Neb. Re-elected new party	R_{17} Mass. Gain	R_{16} Ore. Re-elected	R_{15} N.H. Hold	R_{14} Maine; Re-elected	R_{13} Kan. Re-elected	R_{12} Idaho; Re-elected	R_{11}	R_{10}	R_{9}
		R_{1}	R_{2}	R_{3}	R_{4}	R_{5}	R_{6}	R_{7}	R_{8}

=== Beginning of the next Congress ===
		D_{1}	D_{2}	D_{3}	D_{4}	D_{5}	D_{6}	D_{7}	D_{8}
D_{18}	D_{17}	D_{16}	D_{15}	D_{14}	D_{13}	D_{12}	D_{11}	D_{10}	D_{9}
D_{19}	D_{20}	D_{21}	D_{22}	D_{23}	D_{24}	D_{25}	D_{26}	D_{27}	D_{28}
D_{38}	D_{37}	D_{36}	D_{35}	D_{34}	D_{33}	D_{32}	D_{31}	D_{30}	D_{29}
D_{39}	D_{40}	D_{41}	D_{42}	D_{43}	D_{44}	D_{45}	D_{46}	D_{47}	D_{48}
Majority →									D_{49}
D_{58}	D_{57}	D_{56}	D_{55}	D_{54}	D_{53}	D_{52}	D_{51}	D_{50}	D_{49}
D_{59}	D_{60}	D_{61}	D_{62}	D_{63}	D_{64}	D_{65}	D_{66}	D_{67}	D_{68}
FL_{2}	P_{1}	D_{76} S.D. Appointed (Note: A South Dakota Republican, who was not up for election, died December 20, 1936, and a Democrat was appointed December 29, 1936, to continue the term pending a 1938 special election.)	D_{75}	D_{74}	D_{73}	D_{72}	D_{71}	D_{70}	D_{69}
FL_{1}	I_{1}	R_{16}	R_{15}	R_{14}	R_{13}	R_{12}	R_{11}	R_{10}	R_{9}
		R_{1}	R_{2}	R_{3}	R_{4}	R_{5}	R_{6}	R_{7}	R_{8}

Key

D_{#}	Democratic
FL_{#}	Farmer–Labor
I_{#}	Independent
P_{#}	Progressive
R_{#}	Republican
V_{#}	Vacant

Composition of the Senate after the Election

== Race summaries ==
=== Elections during the 74th Congress ===
In these special elections the winners were seated once they qualified; ordered by election date.

State	Incumbent			Results	Candidates
State	Senator	Party	Electoral history	Results	Candidates
Louisiana (Class 2)	Rose McConnell Long	Democratic	1936 (Appointed)	Interim appointee elected April 21, 1936. Winner was later not elected to the next term; see below.	▌ ✓ Rose McConnell Long (Democratic); Unopposed
Florida (Class 1)	Scott Loftin	Democratic	1936 (Appointed)	Interim appointee retired. New senator elected November 3, 1936. Democratic hold.	▌ ✓ Charles O. Andrews (Democratic) 80.9%; ▌Howard C. Babcock (Republican) 19.1%
Florida (Class 3)	William Luther Hill	Democratic	1936 (Appointed)	Interim appointee retired. New senator elected November 3, 1936. Democratic hold.	▌ ✓ Claude Pepper (Democratic); Unopposed
Iowa (Class 3)	Vacant			Louis Murphy (D) had died July 16, 1936. New senator elected November 3, 1936. Democratic hold	▌ ✓ Guy Gillette (Democratic) 51.9%; ▌Berry F. Halden (Republican) 46.6%
Minnesota (Class 2)	Elmer A. Benson	Farmer–Labor	1935 (Appointed)	Interim appointee retired. New senator elected November 3, 1936. Republican gain. Winner was not a candidate for the next term; see below.	▌ ✓ Guy V. Howard (Republican) 42.89%; ▌Nathaniel J. Holmberg (Republican) 28.42%; ▌Andrews O. Devold (Republican) 19.98%; ▌John G. Alexander (Republican) 8.71%
New Mexico (Class 1)	Dennis Chávez	Democratic	1935 (Appointed)	Interim appointee elected November 3, 1936.	▌ ✓ Dennis Chávez (Democratic) 55.7%; ▌M. A. Otero Jr. (Republican) 44.2%

=== Elections leading to the 75th Congress ===
In these general elections, the winners were elected for the term beginning January 3, 1937; ordered by state.

All of the elections involved the Class 2 seats.

State	Incumbent			Results	Candidates
State	Senator	Party	Electoral history	Results	Candidates
Alabama	John H. Bankhead II	Democratic	1930	Incumbent re-elected.	▌ ✓ John H. Bankhead II (Democratic) 87.0%; ▌H. E. Berkstresser (Republican) 12.2%
Arkansas	Joseph T. Robinson	Democratic	1913; 1918; 1924; 1930	Incumbent re-elected.	▌ ✓ Joseph T. Robinson (Democratic) 81.8%; ▌G. C. Ledbetter (Republican) 16.4%
Colorado	Edward P. Costigan	Democratic	1930	Incumbent retired. New senator elected. Democratic hold.	▌ ✓ Edwin C. Johnson (Democratic) 63.5%; ▌Raymond L. Sauter (Republican) 35.3%
Delaware	Daniel O. Hastings	Republican	1928 (Appointed); 1930	Incumbent lost re-election. New senator elected. Democratic gain.	▌ ✓ James H. Hughes (Democratic) 53.0%; ▌Daniel O. Hastings (Republican) 41.4%; ▌Robert G. Houston (Independent) 5.4%
Georgia	Richard Russell Jr.	Democratic	1932 (special)	Incumbent re-elected.	▌ ✓ Richard Russell Jr. (Democratic); Unopposed
Idaho	William Borah	Republican	1907; 1913; 1918; 1924; 1930	Incumbent re-elected.	▌ ✓ William Borah (Republican) 63.4%; ▌C. Ben Ross (Democratic) 36.6%
Illinois	J. Hamilton Lewis	Democratic	1913 (Late); 1918 (Lost); 1930	Incumbent re-elected.	▌ ✓ J. Hamilton Lewis (Democratic) 56.5%; ▌Otis F. Glenn (Republican) 40.7%
Iowa	L. J. Dickinson	Republican	1930	Incumbent lost re-election. New senator elected. Democratic gain.	▌ ✓ Clyde L. Herring (Democratic) 50.5%; ▌L. J. Dickinson (Republican) 47.1%
Kansas	Arthur Capper	Republican	1918; 1924; 1930	Incumbent re-elected.	▌ ✓ Arthur Capper (Republican) 51.0%; ▌Omar B. Ketchum (Democratic) 48.4%
Kentucky	M. M. Logan	Democratic	1930	Incumbent re-elected.	▌ ✓ M. M. Logan (Democratic) 58.8%; ▌Robert M. Lucas (Republican) 39.8%
Louisiana	Rose McConnell Long	Democratic	1936 (Appointed); 1936 (special)	Incumbent retired. New senator elected. Democratic hold.	▌ ✓ Allen J. Ellender (Democratic); Unopposed
Maine	Wallace H. White	Republican	1930	Incumbent re-elected.	▌ ✓ Wallace H. White (Republican) 50.8%; ▌Louis J. Brann (Democratic) 49.3%
Massachusetts	Marcus A. Coolidge	Democratic	1930	Incumbent retired. New senator elected. Republican gain.	▌ ✓ Henry Cabot Lodge Jr. (Republican) 48.5%; ▌James Michael Curley (Democratic) 41.0%; ▌Thomas C. O'Brien (Independent) 7.4%
Michigan	James Couzens	Republican	1922 (Appointed); 1924 (special); 1924; 1930	Incumbent lost renomination then died October 22, 1936. New senator elected. Democratic gain. Winner was later appointed to finish term.	▌ ✓ Prentiss M. Brown (Democratic) 53.3%; ▌Wilber M. Brucker (Republican) 41.8%
Minnesota	Elmer A. Benson	Farmer–Labor	1935 (Appointed)	Interim appointee retired to run for Governor of Minnesota. New senator elected. Farmer–Labor hold. Winner was not a candidate to finish the current term.	▌ ✓ Ernest Lundeen (Farmer–Labor) 62.2%; ▌Theodore Christianson (Republican) 37.8%
Mississippi	Pat Harrison	Democratic	1918; 1924; 1930	Incumbent re-elected.	▌ ✓ Pat Harrison (Democratic); Unopposed
Montana	James E. Murray	Democratic	1934 (special)	Incumbent re-elected.	▌ ✓ James E. Murray (Democratic) 55.0%; ▌Thomas O. Larson (Republican) 27.1%; ▌Joseph P. Monaghan (Independent) 17.9%
Nebraska	George W. Norris	Republican	1913; 1918; 1924; 1930	Incumbent re-elected as an independent. Independent gain.	▌ ✓ George W. Norris (Independent) 43.8%; ▌Robert G. Simmons (Republican) 37.8%; ▌Terry Carpenter (Democratic) 18.4%
New Hampshire	Henry W. Keyes	Republican	1918; 1924; 1930	Incumbent retired. New senator elected. Republican hold.	▌ ✓ Styles Bridges (Republican) 51.9%; ▌William Nathaniel Rogers (Democratic) 47.7%
New Jersey	W. Warren Barbour	Republican	1931 (Appointed); 1932 (special)	Incumbent lost re-election. New senator elected. Democratic gain.	▌ ✓ William H. Smathers (Democratic) 54.9%; ▌W. Warren Barbour (Republican) 44.3%
New Mexico	Carl Hatch	Democratic	1933 (Appointed); 1934 (special)	Incumbent re-elected.	▌ ✓ Carl Hatch (Democratic) 61.7%; ▌Ernest W. Everly (Republican) 38.3%
North Carolina	Josiah Bailey	Democratic	1930	Incumbent re-elected.	▌ ✓ Josiah Bailey (Democratic) 70.8%; ▌Frank R. Patton (Republican) 29.2%
Oklahoma	Thomas Gore	Democratic	1907 (New state); 1909; 1914; 1920 (Lost); 1930	Incumbent lost renomination. New senator elected. Democratic hold.	▌ ✓ Joshua B. Lee (Democratic) 68.0%; ▌Herbert K. Hyde (Republican) 31.6%
Oregon	Charles L. McNary	Republican	1917 (Appointed); 1918 (Not elected 1918 (Appointed); 1918; 1924; 1930	Incumbent re-elected.	▌ ✓ Charles L. McNary (Republican) 51.0%; ▌Willis Mahoney (Democratic) 48.4%
Rhode Island	Jesse H. Metcalf	Republican	1924 (special); 1924; 1930	Incumbent lost re-election. New senator elected. Democratic gain.	▌ ✓ Theodore F. Green (Democratic) 48.6%; ▌Jesse H. Metcalf (Republican) 44.4%; ▌Ludger LaPointe (Independent) 7.0%
South Carolina	James F. Byrnes	Democratic	1930	Incumbent re-elected.	▌ ✓ James F. Byrnes (Democratic); Unopposed
South Dakota	William J. Bulow	Democratic	1930	Incumbent re-elected.	▌ ✓ William J. Bulow (Democratic) 48.8%; ▌Chan Gurney (Republican) 46.8%
Tennessee	Nathan L. Bachman	Democratic	1933 (Appointed); 1934 (special)	Incumbent re-elected.	▌ ✓ Nathan L. Bachman (Democratic) 76.4%; ▌Dwayne D. Maddox (Republican) 18.8%
Texas	Morris Sheppard	Democratic	1913 (special); 1913; 1918; 1924; 1930	Incumbent re-elected.	▌ ✓ Morris Sheppard (Democratic) 92.6%; ▌Carlos G. Watson (Republican) 7.1%
Virginia	Carter Glass	Democratic	1920 (Appointed); 1920 (special); 1924; 1930	Incumbent re-elected.	▌ ✓ Carter Glass (Democratic) 91.7%; ▌George Rohken (Republican) 4.7%; ▌Donald Burke (Communist) 3.3%
West Virginia	Matthew M. Neely	Democratic	1930	Incumbent re-elected.	▌ ✓ Matthew M. Neely (Democratic) 59.1%; ▌Hugh Ike Shott (Republican) 40.9%
Wyoming	Robert D. Carey	Republican	1930 (special); 1930	Incumbent lost re-election. New senator elected. Democratic gain.	▌ ✓ Harry Schwartz (Democratic) 53.8%; ▌Robert D. Carey (Republican) 45.4%

== Closest races ==
Eleven races had a margin of victory under 10%:

State	Party of winner	Margin
Maine	Republican	1.5%
Kansas	Republican	2.6%
Oregon	Republican	2.6%
South Dakota	Democratic	2.0%
Iowa	Democratic (flip)	3.4%
New Hampshire	Republican	4.2%
Rhode Island	Democratic (flip)	4.2%
Iowa (special)	Democratic (flip)	5.3%
Nebraska	Independent (flip)	6.0%
Massachusetts	Republican (flip)	7.5%
Wyoming	Democratic (flip)	8.4%

There is no tipping point state.

== Alabama ==
1936 United States Senate election in Alabama
- November 2, 1936
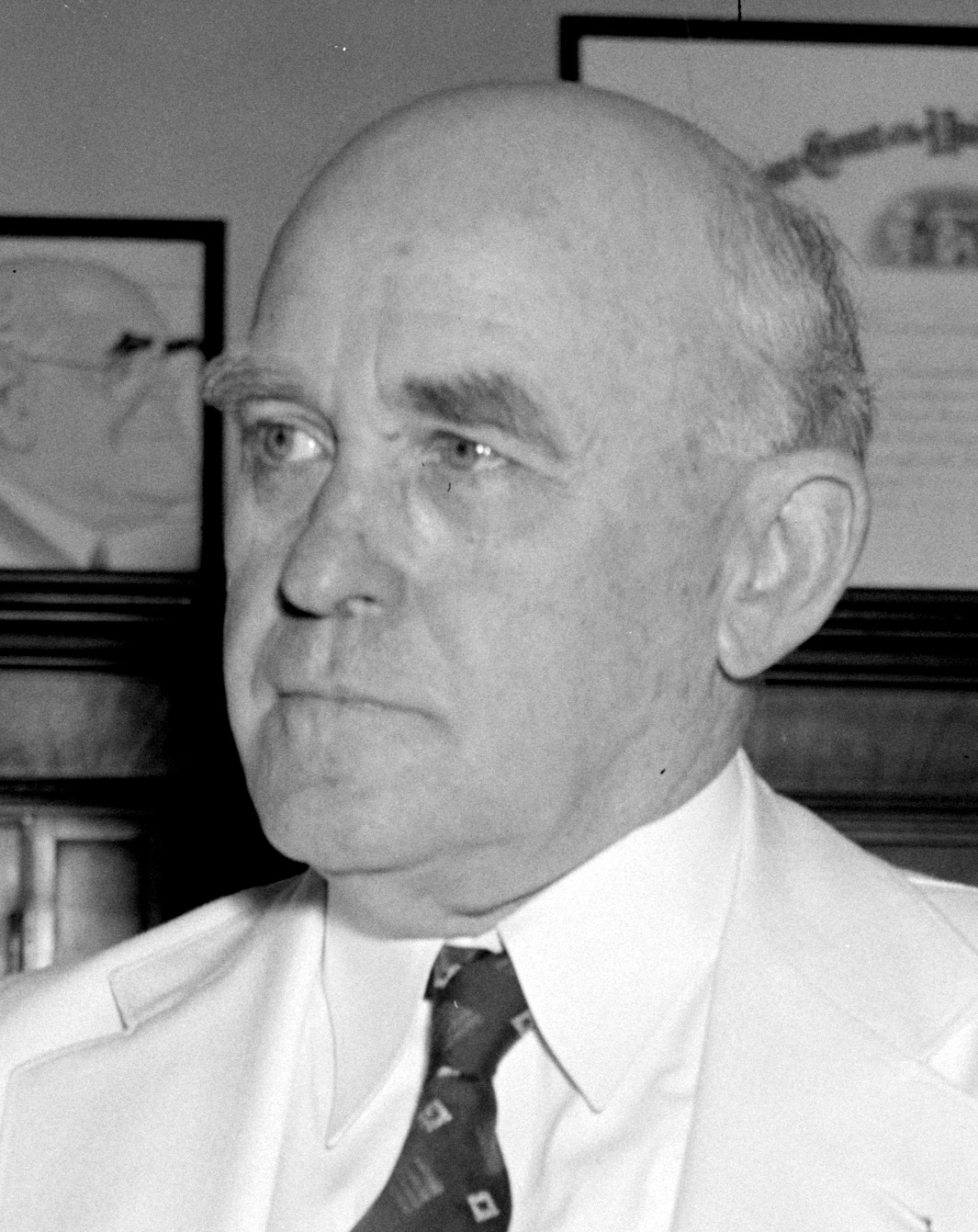

Nominee	John H. Bankhead II	H. E. Berkstresser
Party	Democratic	Republican
Popular vote	239,632	33,698
Percentage	87.03%	12.24%
- County results Bankhead: 50–60% 60–70% 70–80% 80–90% >90% Berkstresser: 50–60%
U.S. senator before election
John H. Bankhead II
Democratic
Elected U.S. Senator
John H. Bankhead II
Democratic

1936 United States Senate election in Alabama
Party	Candidate	Votes	%
Democratic	John H. Bankhead II (Incumbent)	239,532	87.02%
Republican	H. E. Berkstresser	33,697	12.24%
Independent	William C. Irby	2,022	0.73%
Independent	Sam Powe	1	0.00%
Majority		105,835	74.78%
Turnout		275,252	
Democratic hold			

== Arkansas ==
1936 United States Senate election in Arkansas
- November 3, 1936
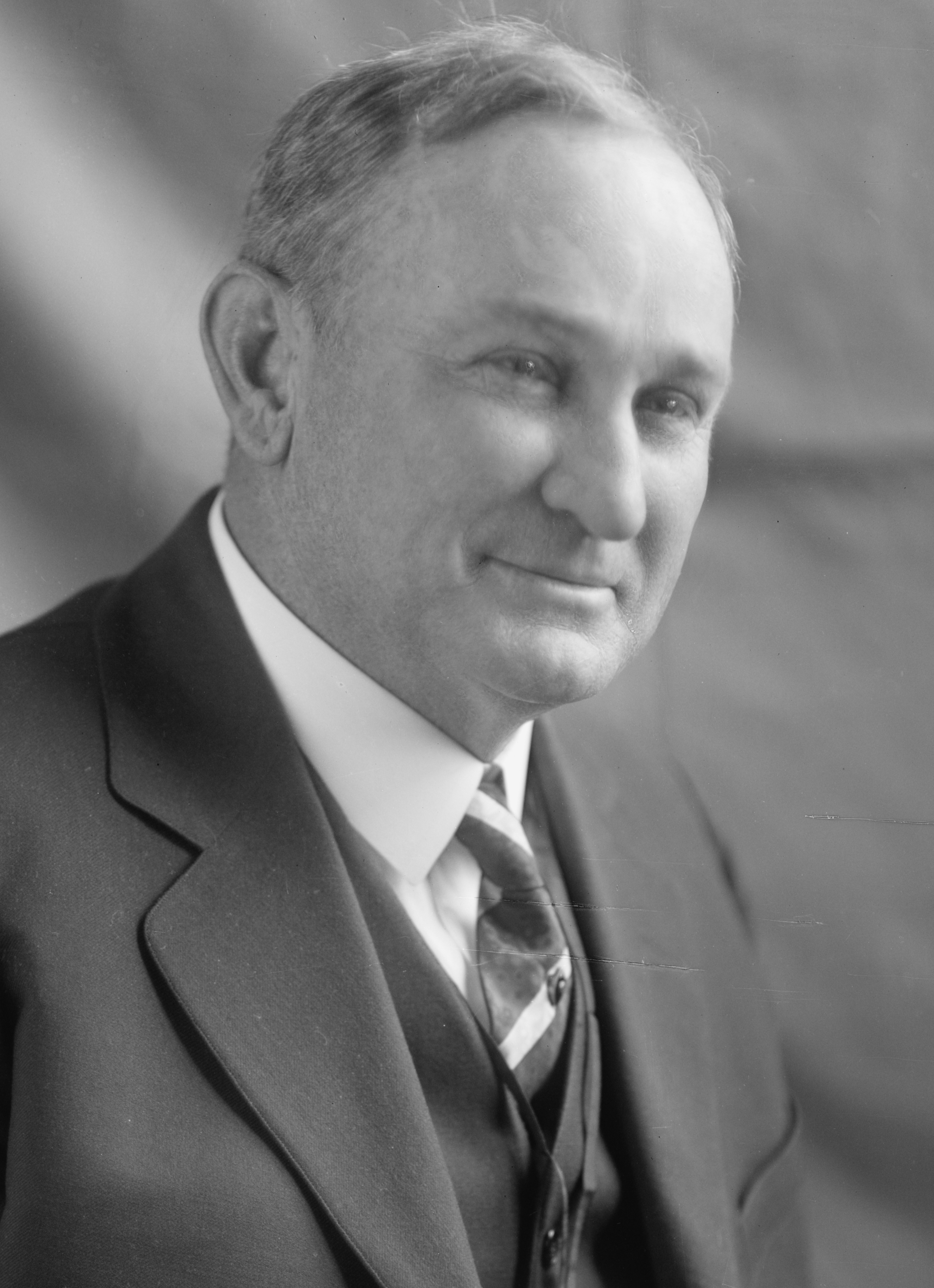

Nominee	Joe T. Robinson	G.C. Ledbetter
Party	Democratic	Republican
Popular vote	170,336	27,746
Percentage	84.08%	15.06%
- County results Robinson: 50–60% 60–70% 70–80% 80–90% >90% Ledbetter: 50–60% Williams: 50–60% Tie: 40–50%
U.S. senator before election
Joseph T. Robinson
Democratic
Elected U.S. Senator
Joseph T. Robinson
Democratic

1936 United States Senate election in Arkansas
Party	Candidate	Votes	%
Democratic	Joseph Taylor Robinson	154,866	84.08%
Republican	G. C. Ledbetter	27,746	15.06%
Independent	Claude C. Williams	1,587	0.86%
Majority		127,120	69.02%
Turnout		184,199	
Democratic hold			

== Colorado ==
1936 United States Senate election in Colorado
- November 3, 1936
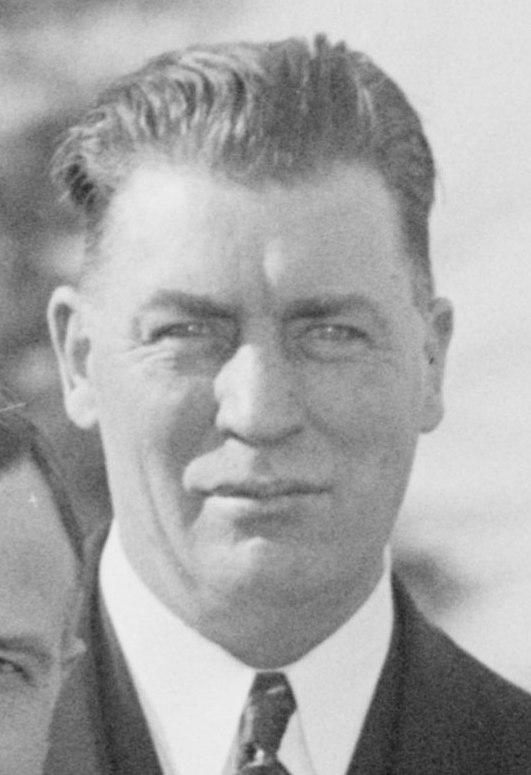

Nominee	Ed Johnson	Ray Sauter
Party	Democratic	Republican
Popular vote	299,376	166,308
Percentage	63.45%	35.25%
- Results by county Johnson: 50–60% 60–70% 70–80% Sauter: 50–60%
U.S. senator before election
Edward P. Costigan
Democratic
Elected U.S. Senator
Edwin C. Johnson
Democratic

1936 United States Senate election in Colorado
Party	Candidate	Votes	%
Democratic	Edwin C. Johnson	299,376	63.45%
Republican	Raymond L. Sauter	166,308	35.25%
Socialist	Carle Whithead	4,438	0.94%
National Union	George W. Carleton	1,705	0.36%
Majority		133,068	28.20%
Turnout		471,827	
Democratic hold			

== Delaware ==
1936 United States Senate election in Delaware
Party	Candidate	Votes	%
Democratic	James H. Hughes	67,136	52.97%
Republican	Daniel O. Hastings (Incumbent)	52,469	41.40%
Independent	Robert G. Houston	6,897	5.44%
Socialist	Charles W. Perry	183	0.14%
Communist	William V. P. Daviatis	53	0.04%
Majority		14,667	11.57%
Turnout		126,738	
Democratic gain from Republican			

== Florida (special) ==
There were two special elections in Florida, due to the May 8, 1936, death of four-term Democrat Park Trammell and the June 17, 1936, death of five-term Democrat Duncan U. Fletcher.

=== Florida (special, class 1) ===
1936 Florida U.S. Senate special election
- November 3, 1936
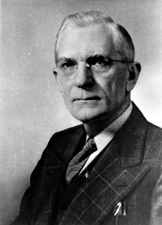

Nominee	Charles O. Andrews	Howard C. Babcock
Party	Democratic	Republican
Popular vote	241,528	57,016
Percentage	80.90%	19.10%
- Results by county Andrews: 60–70% 70–80% 80–90% >90%
U.S. senator before election
Scott Loftin
Democratic
Elected U.S. Senator
Charles O. Andrews
Democratic

Democrat Scott Loftin was appointed May 26, 1936, to continue the term, pending a special election. Primaries were held August 11, 1936.

1936 United States Senate election in Florida (Class 1 special)
Party	Candidate	Votes	%
Democratic	Charles O. Andrews	241,528	81.90%
Republican	Howard C. Babcock	57,016	19.10%
Majority		184,512	62.80%
Turnout		298,544	20.33%
Democratic hold			

Andrews would be re-elected once and serve until his own death on September 18, 1946.

=== Florida (special, class 3) ===
Democrat William Luther Hill was appointed July 1, 1936, to continue the term, pending a special election, after the death of Senator Duncan U. Fletcher on June 17, 1936. Democrat Claude Pepper, who had lost to Trammell in 1934, won this election.

1936 United States Senate Class 3 special election in Florida
Party	Candidate	Votes	%
Democratic	Claude Pepper	246,050	100.00%
Turnout			16.76%
Democratic hold			

Pepper would be re-elected twice and serve until he lost renomination in 1950. He would later be elected to the U.S. House of Representatives and served there for 26 years.

== Georgia ==
Democratic primary
Candidate	Votes	%	CUV
Richard Russell Jr.	165,111	65.54	344
Eugene Talmadge	86,203	34.46	66

1936 United States Senate election in Georgia
Party	Candidate	Votes	%
Democratic	Richard Russell Jr. (Incumbent)	285,468	100.00%
Democratic hold			

== Idaho ==
1936 United States Senate election in Idaho
- November 3, 1936
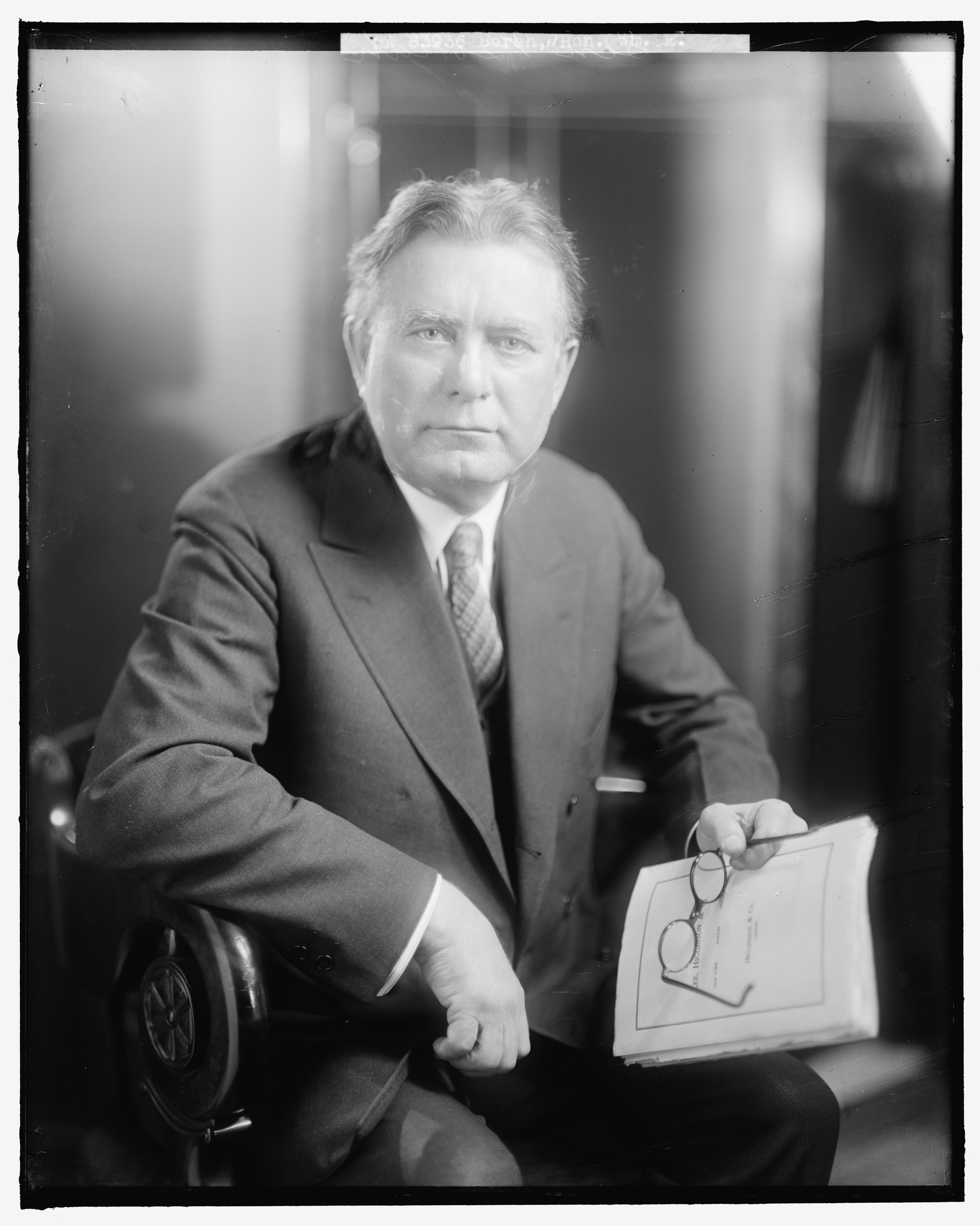

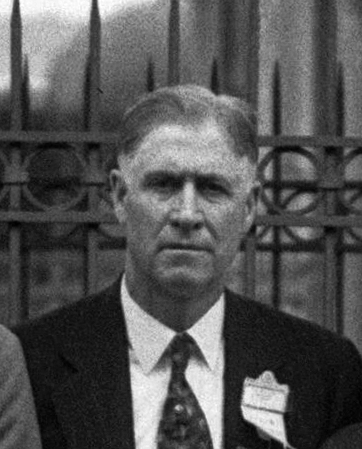
Nominee	William Borah	C. Ben Ross
Party	Republican	Democratic
Popular vote	128,723	74,444
Percentage	63.36%	36.64%
- County results Borah: 50–60% 60–70% 70–80% Ross: 50–60%
U.S. senator before election
William Borah
Republican
Elected U.S. Senator
William Borah
Republican

1936 United States Senate election in Idaho
Party	Candidate	Votes	%
Republican	William Borah (Incumbent)	128,723	63.36%
Democratic	C. Ben Ross	74,444	36.64%
Majority		54,279	26.72%
Turnout		203,167	
Republican hold			

== Illinois ==
1936 United States Senate election in Illinois
- November 3, 1936
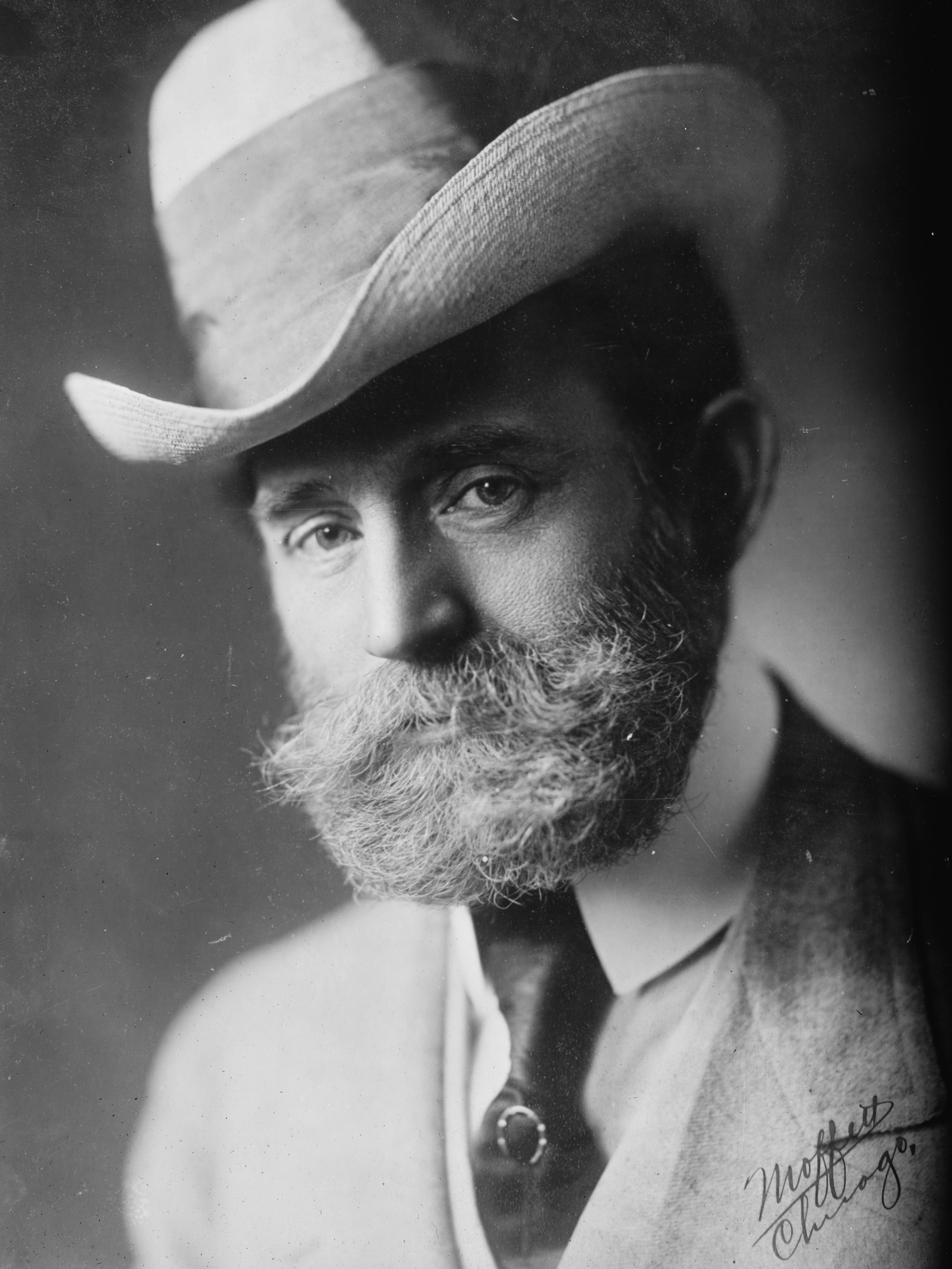

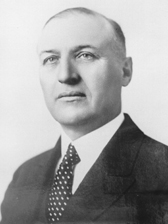
Nominee	J. Hamilton Lewis	Otis F. Glenn
Party	Democratic	Republican
Popular vote	2,142,887	1,545,170
Percentage	56.47%	40.72%
- Results by county Lewis: 40–50% 50–60% 60–70% Glenn: 40–50% 50–60% 60–70%
U.S. senator before election
J. Hamilton Lewis
Democratic
Elected U.S. senator
J. Hamilton Lewis
Democratic

1936 United States Senate election in Illinois
Party	Candidate	Votes	%
Democratic	J. Hamilton Lewis (Incumbent)	2,142,887	56.47%
Republican	Otis F. Glenn	1,545,170	40.72%
Union	Newton Jenkins	93,696	2.47%
Socialist	Arthur McDowell	7,405	0.20%
Prohibition	Adah M. Hagler	3,298	0.09%
Socialist Labor	Frank Schnur	2,208	0.06%
Majority		597,717	15.75%
Turnout		3,794,664	
Democratic hold			

== Iowa ==
=== Iowa (regular) ===
1936 United States Senate election in Iowa
- November 3, 1936
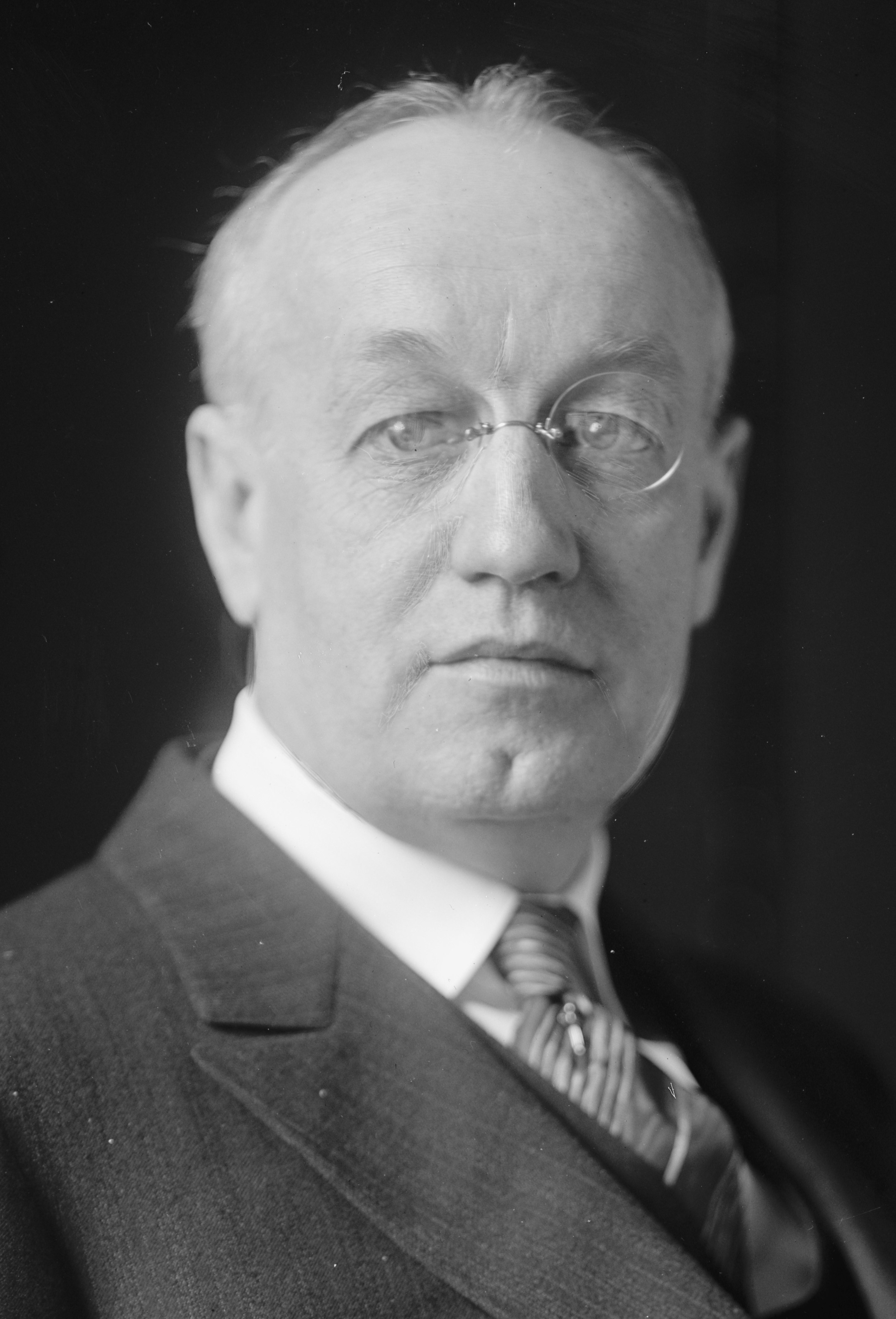

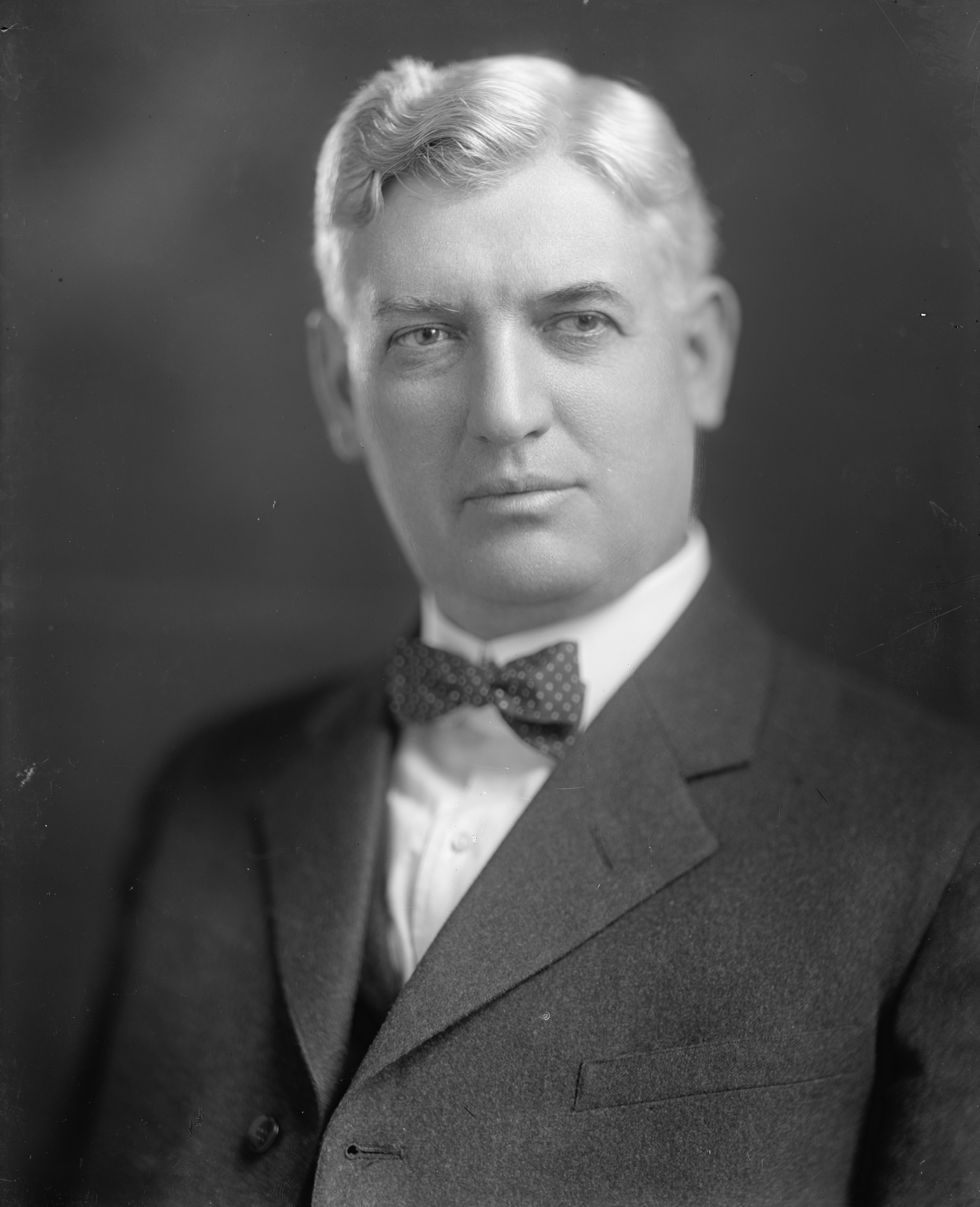
Nominee	Clyde Herring	L. J. Dickinson
Party	Democratic	Republican
Popular vote	539,554	504,535
Percentage	50.26%	47.34%
- County Results; Herring: 40–50% 50–60% 60–70% Dickinson: 40–50% 50–60% 60–70%
U.S. senator before election
Lester J. Dickinson
Republican
Elected U.S. Senator
Clyde Herring
Democratic

1936 United States Senate election in Iowa
Party	Candidate	Votes	%
Democratic	Clyde L. Herring	539,555	50.34%
Republican	Lester J. Dickinson (Incumbent)	503,635	46.99%
Farmer–Labor	George F. Buresch	25,567	2.39%
Prohibition	John B. Hammond	1,726	0.16%
Socialist	Laetitia M. Conrad	1,233	0.12%
Majority		35,920	3.35%
Turnout		1,071,716	
Democratic gain from Republican			

=== Iowa (special) ===
1936 United States Senate Special Election
- November 3, 1936
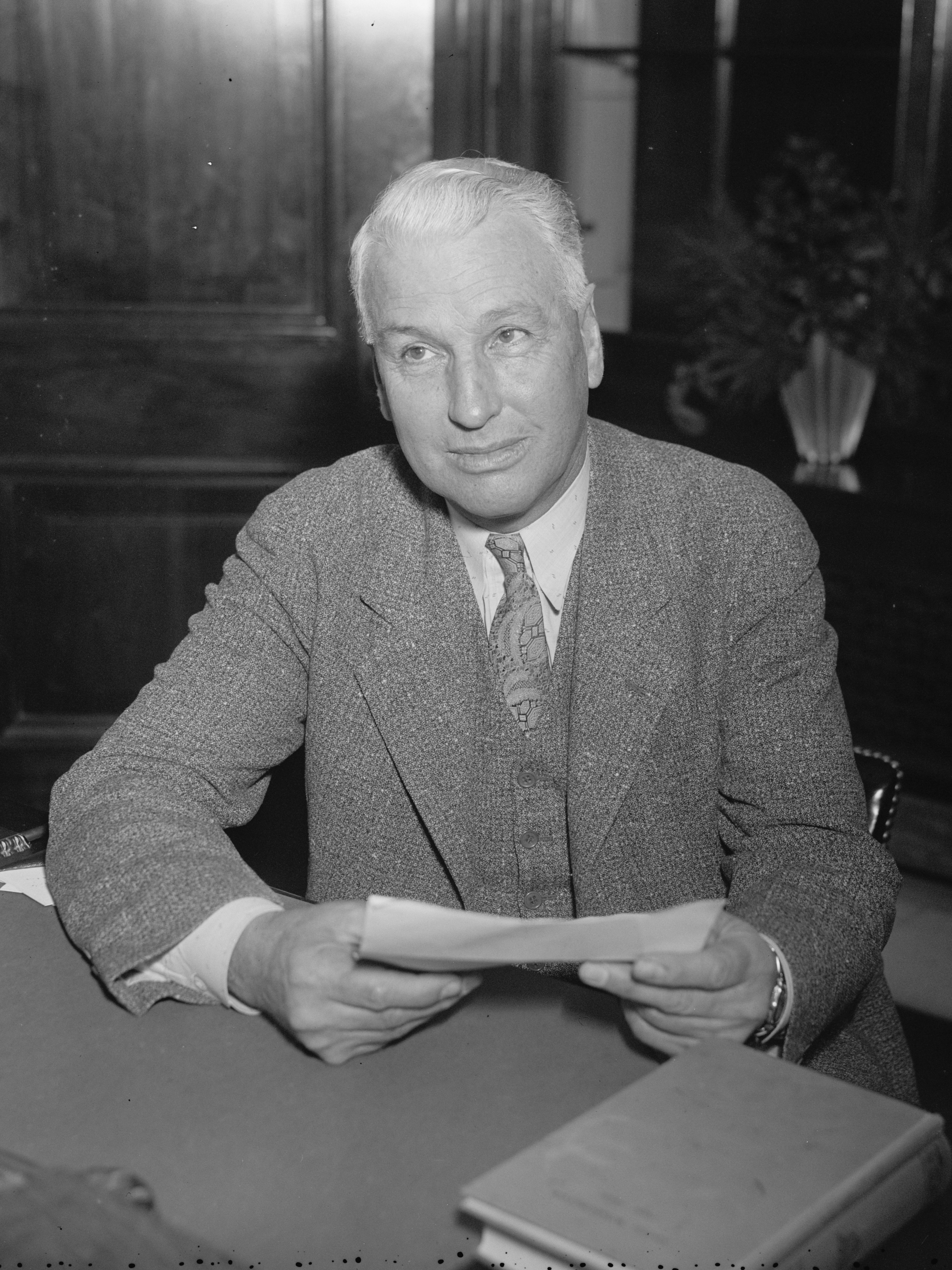

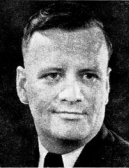
	Majority party	Minority party
Candidate	Guy M. Gillette	Berry F. Halden
Party	Democratic	Republican
Popular vote	536,075	478,521
Percentage	51.91%	46.43%
- County Results; Gillette: 40–50% 50–60% 60–70% Halden: 40–50% 50–60% 60–70%
U.S. senator before election
Vacant
Elected U.S. Senator
Guy M. Gillette
Democratic

1936 United States Senate special election in Iowa
Party	Candidate	Votes	%
Democratic	Guy M. Gillette	535,966	52.00%
Republican	Berry.F. Halden	478,516	46.43%
Farmer–Labor	Ernest R. Quick	16,179	1.57%
Majority		57,450	5.57%
Turnout		1,030,661	
Democratic hold			

== Kansas ==
1936 United States Senate election in Kansas
- November 3, 1936
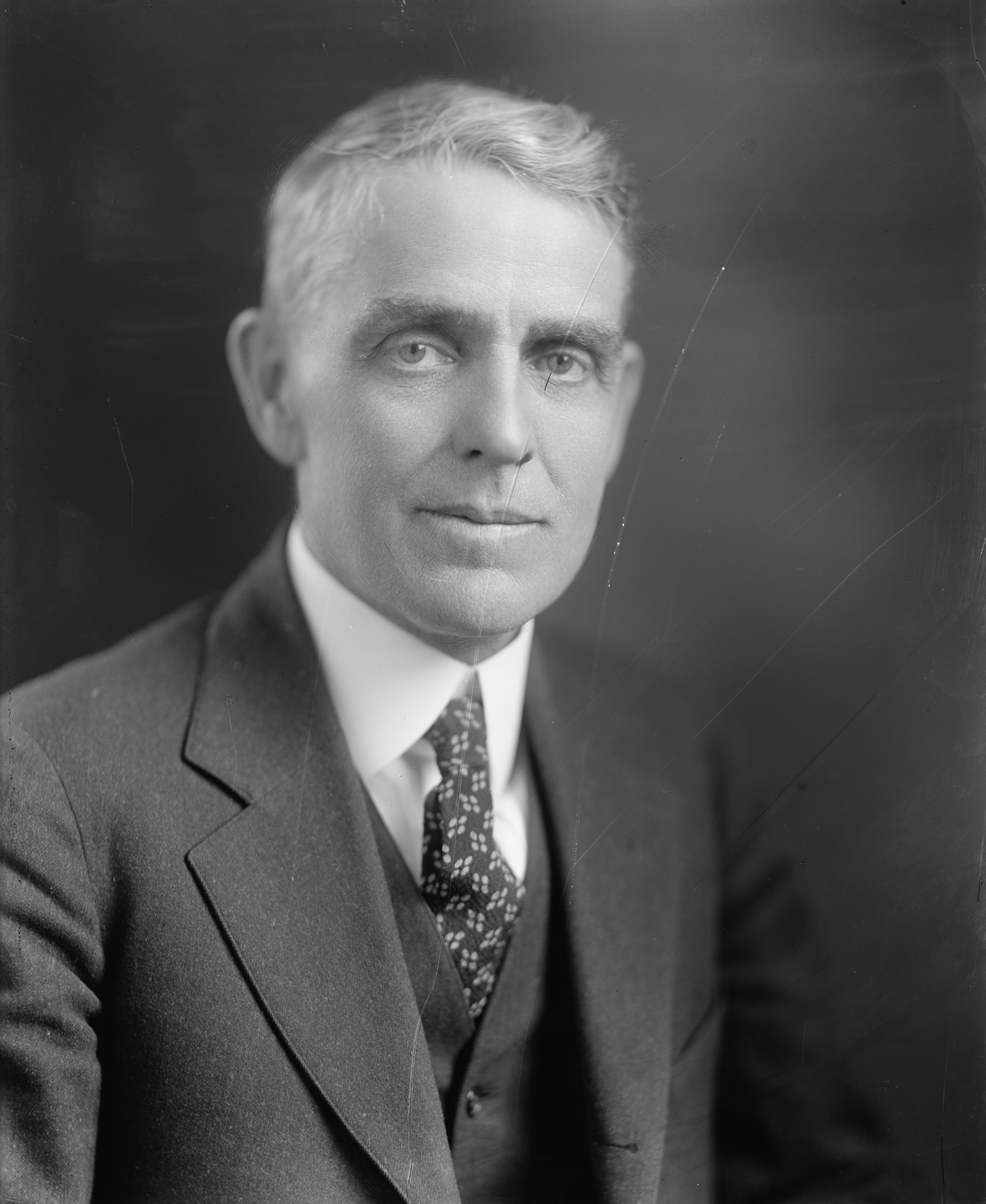
Nominee	Arthur Capper	Omar B. Ketchum
Party	Republican	Democratic
Popular vote	417,873	386,685
Percentage	51.63%	47.78%
- County results Capper: 40–50% 50–60% 60–70% Ketchum: 40–50% 50–60% 60–70%
U.S. senator before election
Arthur Capper
Republican
Elected U.S. Senator
Arthur Capper
Republican

1936 United States Senate election in Kansas
Party	Candidate	Votes	%
Republican	Arthur Capper (Incumbent)	417,873	51.63%
Democratic	Omar B. Ketchum	386,685	47.78%
Socialist	T. C. Hager	4,775	0.59%
Majority		31,188	3.85%
Turnout		809,333	
Republican hold			

== Kentucky ==
1936 United States Senate election in Kentucky
- November 3, 1936
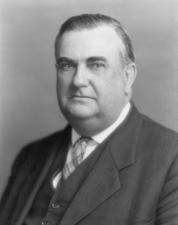

Nominee	M. M. Logan	Robert H. Lucas
Party	Democratic	Republican
Popular vote	539,968	365,850
Percentage	58.80%	39.84%
- County results Logan: 50–60% 60–70% 70–80% 80–90% Lucas: 50–60% 60–70% 70–80% 80–90%
U.S. senator before election
M. M. Logan
Democratic
Elected U.S. Senator
M. M. Logan
Democratic

1936 United States Senate election in Kentucky
Party	Candidate	Votes	%
Democratic	M. M. Logan (Incumbent)	539,968	58.80%
Republican	Robert H. Lucas	365,850	39.84%
Union	William M. Likins	11,709	1.28%
Socialist	W. E. Sandefer	541	0.06%
Socialist Labor	Ferdinand Zimmerer	271	0.03%
Majority		174,118	18.96%
Turnout		918,339	
Democratic hold			

== Louisiana ==
=== Louisiana (regular) ===
1936 United States Senate election in Louisiana
Party	Candidate	Votes	%
Democratic	Allen J. Ellender	293,256	100.00%
None	Scattering	7	0.00%
Majority		293,249	100.00%
Turnout		293,263	
Democratic hold			

=== Louisiana (special) ===
Democrat Rose McConnell Long was elected April 21, 1936, to finish the term to which she was appointed on January 31, 1936. She was not a candidate, however, to the next term on November 3, 1936, see above.

1936 United States Senate special election in Louisiana
- April 21, 1936
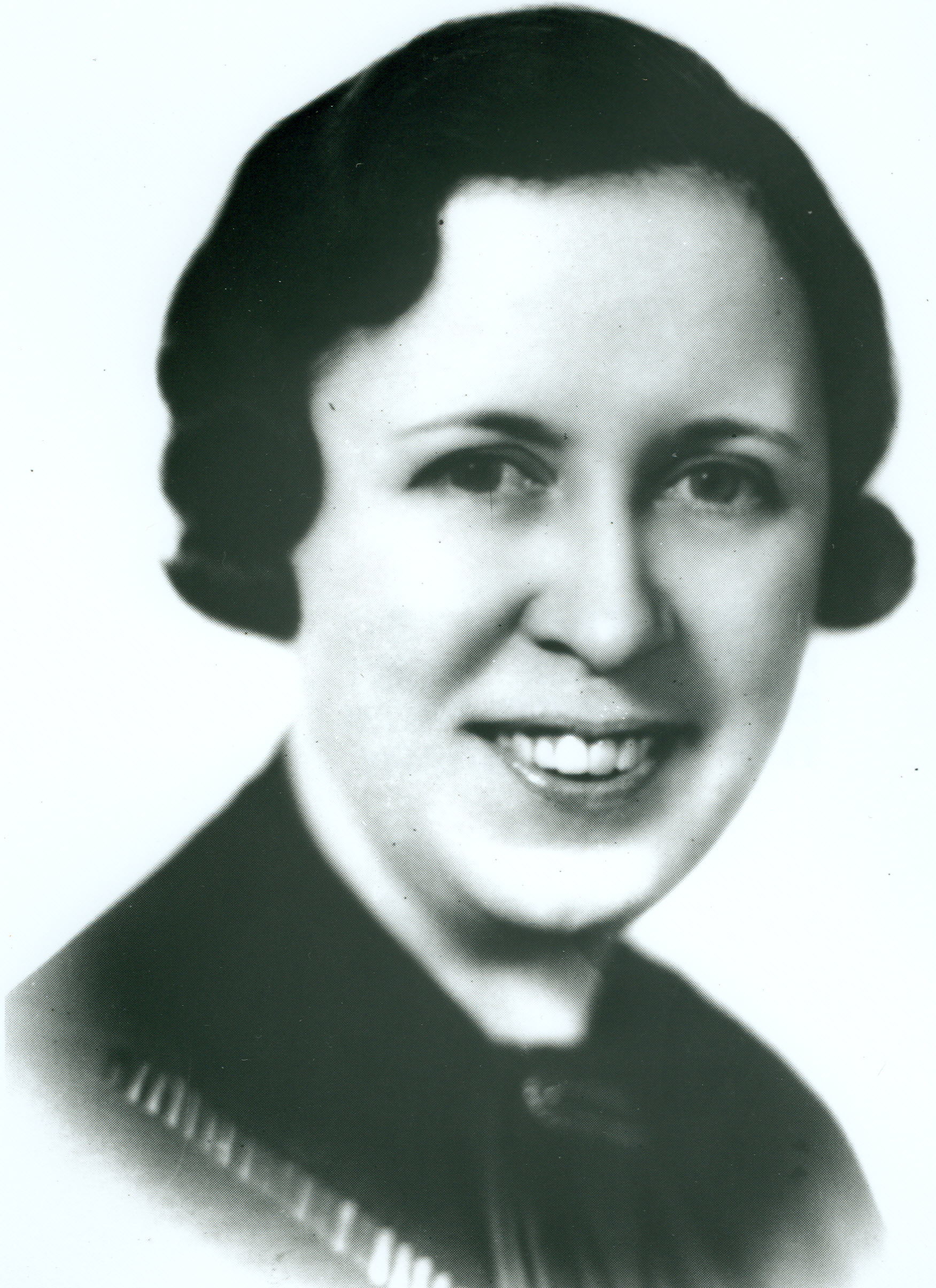
Nominee	Rose McConnell Long
Party	Democratic
Popular vote	131,930
Percentage	100.00%
- Parish results Long 90–100%
U.S. senator before election
Rose McConnell Long
Democratic
Elected U.S. Senator
Rose McConnell Long
Democratic

== Maine ==
Maine election
- September 14, 1942
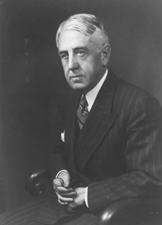
Nominee	Wallace White	Fulton J. Redman
Party	Republican	Democratic
Popular vote	158,068	153,420
Percentage	50.75%	49.25%
- County results White: 50–60% 60–70% Redman: 50–60% 60–70%
U.S. senator before election
Wallace H. White Jr.
Republican
Elected U.S. Senator
Wallace H. White Jr.
Republican

1936 United States Senate election in Maine
Party	Candidate	Votes	%
Republican	Wallace H. White Jr. (Incumbent)	158,068	50.75%
Democratic	Louis J. Brann	153,420	49.25%
Majority		4,648	1.50%
Turnout		311,488	
Republican hold			

== Massachusetts ==
1936 United States Senate election in Massachusetts
- November 3, 1936
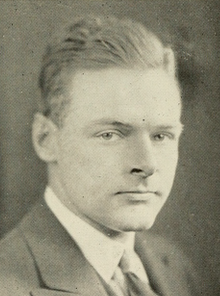

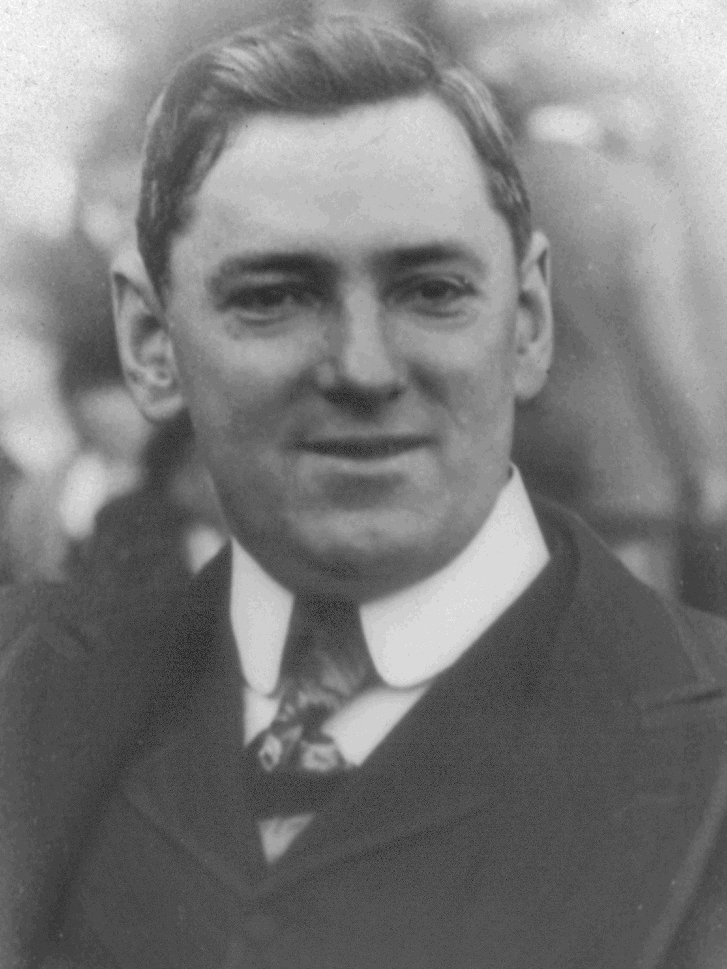

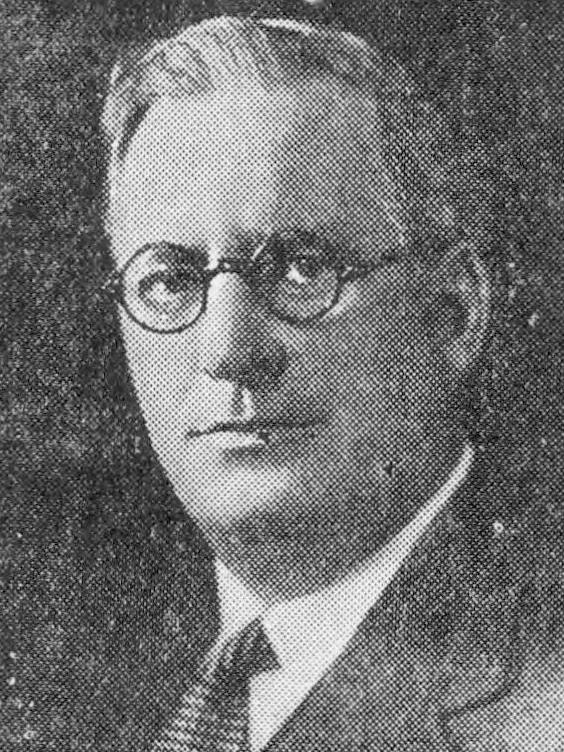
Nominee	Henry Cabot Lodge Jr.	James Michael Curley	Thomas C. O'Brien
Party	Republican	Democratic	Union
Popular vote	875,160	739,751	134,245
Percentage	48.53%	41.02%	7.44%
- Lodge: 40–50% 50–60% 60–70% 70–80% 80–90% 90–100% Curley: 40–50% 50–60% 60–70% 70–80%
U.S. senator before election
Marcus A. Coolidge
Democratic
Elected U.S. Senator
Henry Cabot Lodge Jr.
Republican

Massachusetts general election
Party	Candidate	Votes	%	±%
Republican	Henry Cabot Lodge Jr.	875,160	48.53	+3.86
Democratic	James Michael Curley	739,751	41.02	−12.99
Union	Thomas C. O'Brien	134,245	7.44	+7.44
Economy	Alonzo B. Cook	11,519	0.64	+0.64
Social Justice	Guy M. Gray	9,906	0.55	+0.55
Socialist	Albert Sprague Coolidge	9,763	0.54	−0.06
Townsend	Moses H. Gulesian	7,408	0.41	+0.41
Socialist Labor	Ernest L. Dodge	7,408	0.39	+0.01
Communist	Charles Flaherty	4,821	0.27	−0.06
Prohibition	Wilbur D. Moon	3,677	0.20	+0.20
Write-in		16	0.00	
total		1,803,674	100.00	

== Michigan ==
1936 United States Senate election in Michigan
- November 3, 1936
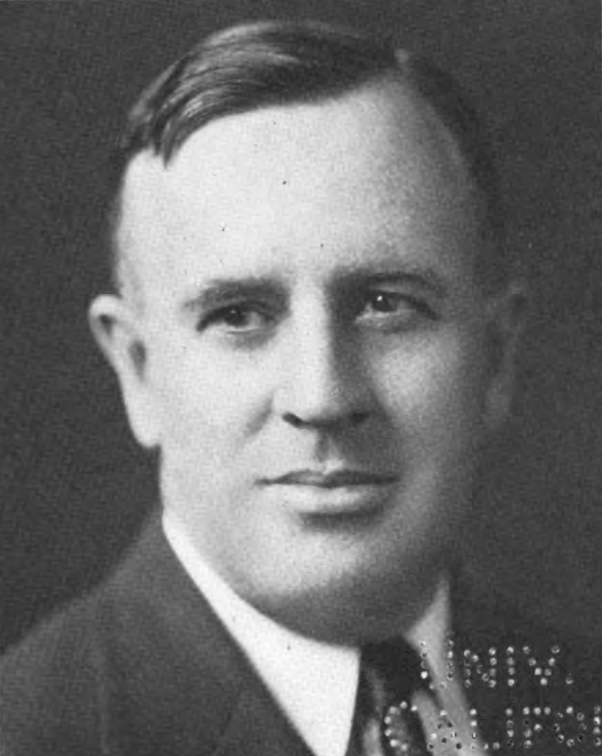

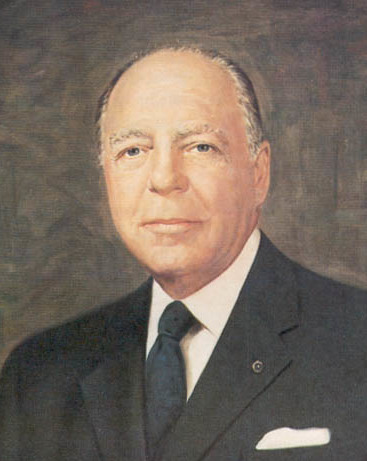
Nominee	Prentiss M. Brown	Wilber M. Brucker
Party	Democratic	Republican
Popular vote	910,937	714,602
Percentage	53.29%	41.80%
- County results Brown: 40–50% 50–60% 60–70% Brucker: 40–50% 50–60% 60–70% 70–80%
U.S. senator before election
James J. Couzens
Republican
Elected U.S. Senator
Prentiss M. Brown
Democratic

1936 United States Senate election in Michigan
Party	Candidate	Votes	%
Democratic	Prentiss M. Brown	910,937	53.29%
Republican	Wilber M. Brucker	714,602	41.80%
The Third Party	Louis B. Ward	75,680	4.43%
Socialist	Roy E. Mathews	4,994	0.29%
Communist	Lawrence Emery	2,145	0.13%
Socialist Labor	Ralph Naylor	510	0.03%
Commonwealth Land	Albert B. Sheldon	429	0.03%
American	Edward N. Lee	147	0.01%
Majority		196,335	11.49%
Turnout		1,709,444	
Democratic gain from Republican			

== Minnesota ==
There were 2 elections to the same seat on the same day due to the December 22, 1935, death of two-term Republican Thomas D. Schall.

=== Minnesota (special) ===
Minnesota special election
- November 3, 1936
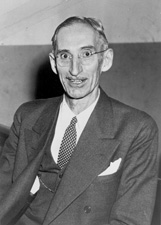

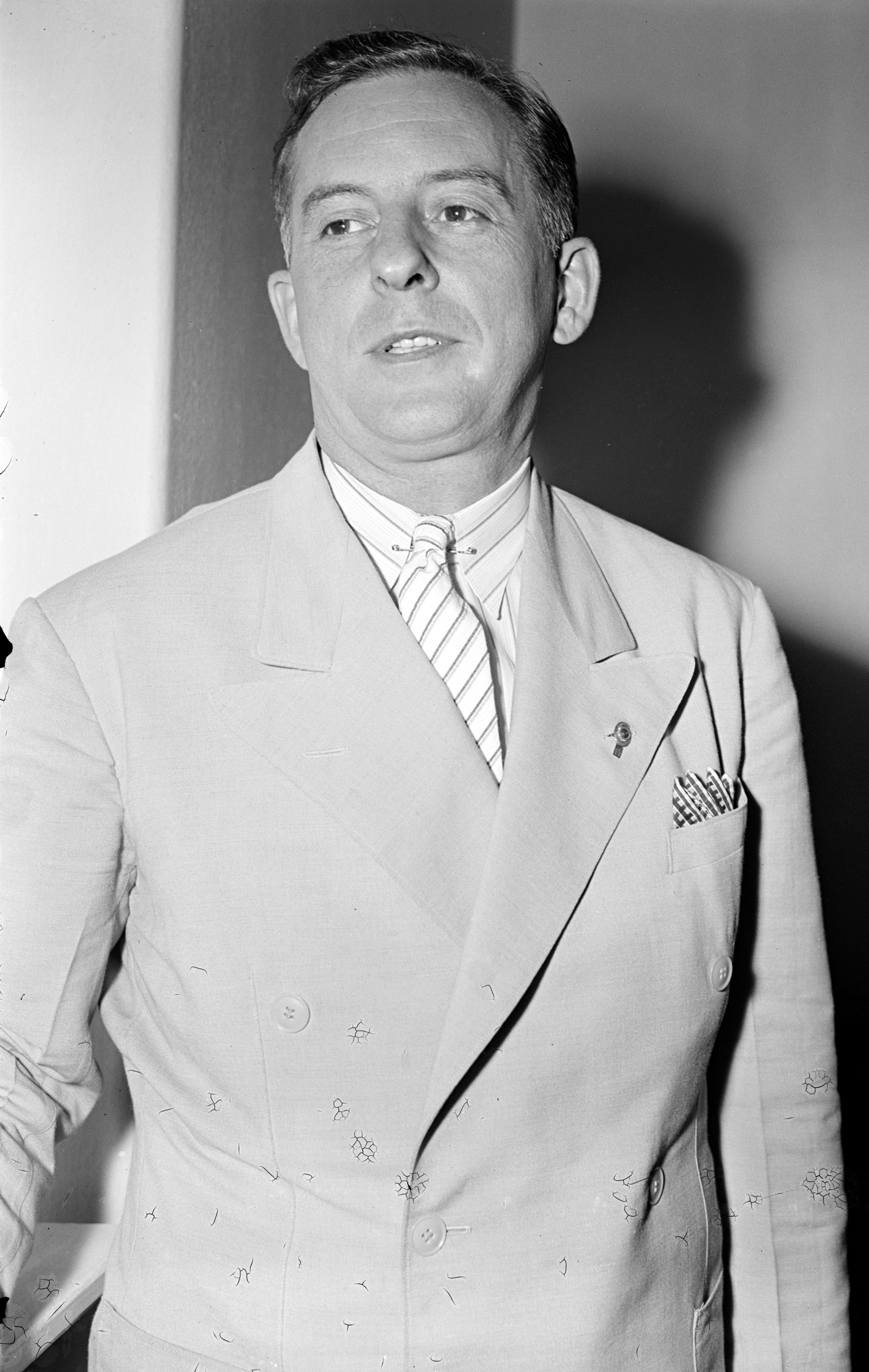
Nominee	Guy V. Howard	N. J. Holmberg
Party	Republican	Independent
Popular vote	317,457	210,364
Percentage	42.89%	28.42%
Nominee	Andrew Olaf Devold	John G. Alexander
Party	Independent	Independent
Popular vote	147,858	64,493
Percentage	19.98%	8.71%
- County results Howard: 30–40% 40–50% 50–60% 60–70% Holmberg: 30–40% Devold: 30–40% Tie: Howard/Holmberg 30–40%
U.S. senator before election
Elmer A. Benson
Farmer–Labor
Elected U.S. Senator
Guy V. Howard
Republican

The election was held to fill the vacancy in the seat formerly held by Thomas D. Schall for the final two months of Schall's unexpired term. Governor Floyd B. Olson had appointed Elmer Benson to fill the seat in 1935, but this appointment was temporary and subject to a special election held in the next general election year thereafter—1936. Benson opted to run for governor instead of running for election to continue for the remainder of the term. No special primaries were held for the special election, and, among Minnesota's three major parties, only the Republican Party of Minnesota officially fielded a candidate—Guy V. Howard. Regardless of the absence of Farmer-Labor and Democratic nominees, Howard nevertheless faced a great degree of competition from independent candidates Nathaniel J. Holmberg, Andrew Olaf Devold, and John G. Alexander.

The candidates were:

- John G. Alexander (I), Attorney and real estate manager
- Andrew Olaf Devold (I), Attorney, State Senator since 1919, former State Representative (1915–1919); a member of the Farmer-Labor Party of Minnesota and formerly a member of the Socialist Party of Minnesota
- N. J. Holmberg (I), Former State Senator (1915–1919) and State Representative (1907–1915); a member of the Republican Party of Minnesota
- Guy V. Howard (R), Businessman and Republican elector in the 1916 presidential election

Minnesota special election
Party	Candidate	Votes	%
Republican	Guy V. Howard	317,457	42.89%
Independent	N. J. Holmberg	210,364	28.42%
Independent	Andrew Olaf Devold	147,858	19.98%
Independent	John G. Alexander	64,493	8.71%
Total votes		740,172	100.00%
Majority		107,093	14.47%
Republican gain from Farmer–Labor			

Howard was not a candidate for the next term, and served only until January 1937.

=== Minnesota (regular) ===
1936 United States Senate election in Minnesota
- November 3, 1936
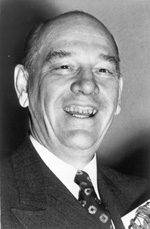

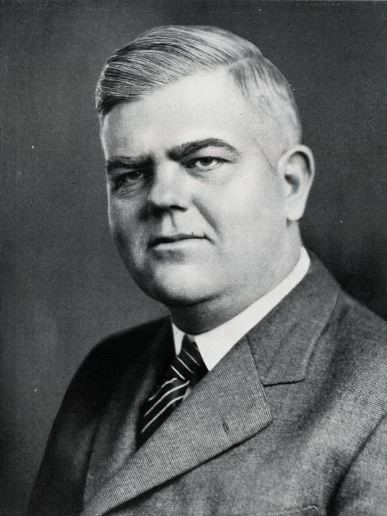
Nominee	Ernest Lundeen	Theodore Christianson
Party	Farmer–Labor	Republican
Popular vote	663,363	402,404
Percentage	62.24%	37.76%
- County results Lundeen: 50–60% 60–70% 70–80% Christianson: 50–60% 60–70%
U.S. senator before election
Elmer A. Benson
Farmer–Labor
Elected U.S. Senator
Ernest Lundeen
Farmer–Labor

The election to the next term was won by Farmer–Labor congressman Ernest Lundeen.

Minnesota regular election
Party	Candidate	Votes	%
Farmer–Labor	Ernest Lundeen	663,363	62.24%
Republican	Theodore Christianson	402,404	37.76%
Majority		260,959	24.48%
Turnout		1,065,767	
Farmer–Labor hold			

== Mississippi ==
1936 U.S. Senate Democratic primary in Mississippi
- August 25, 1936
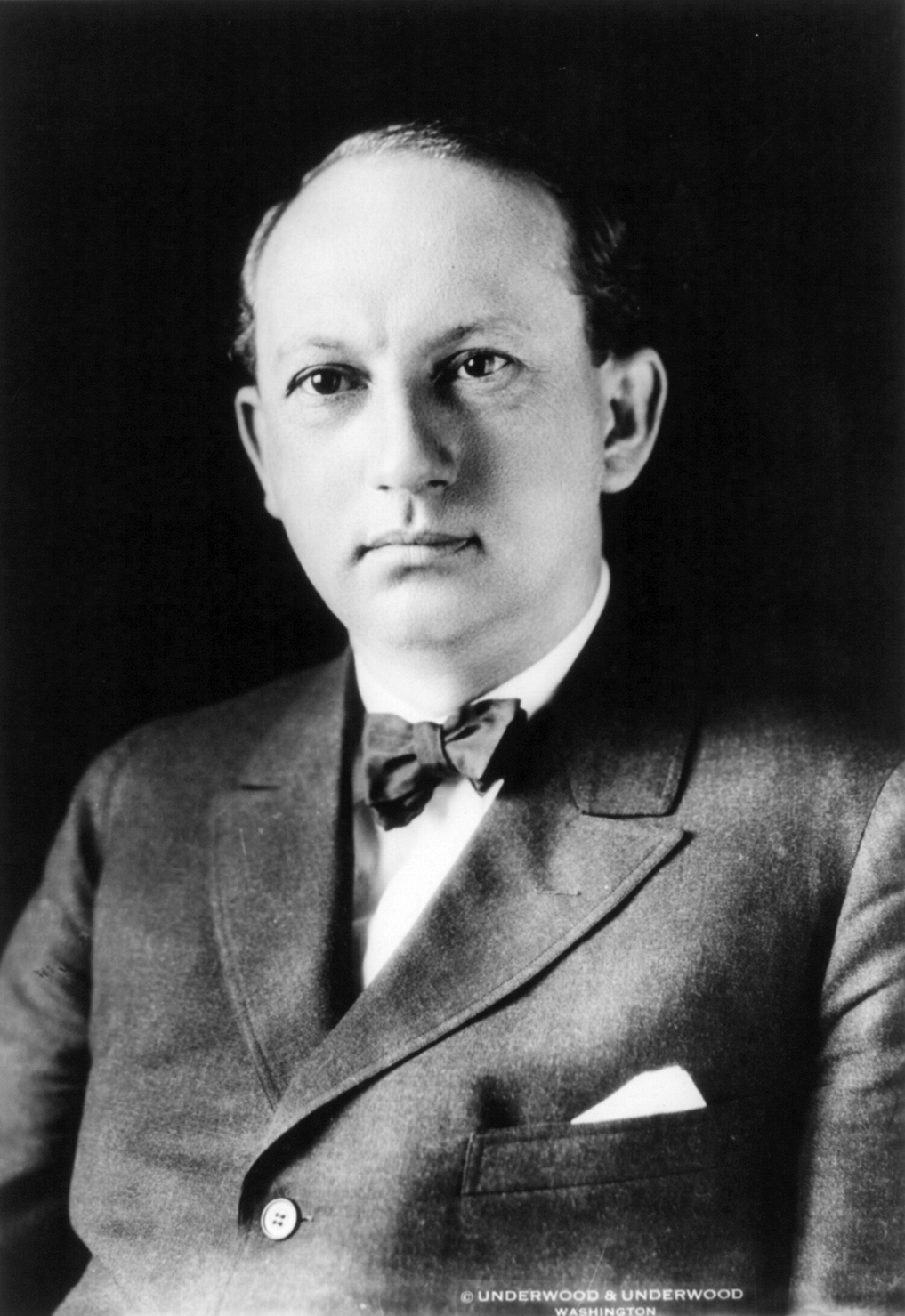

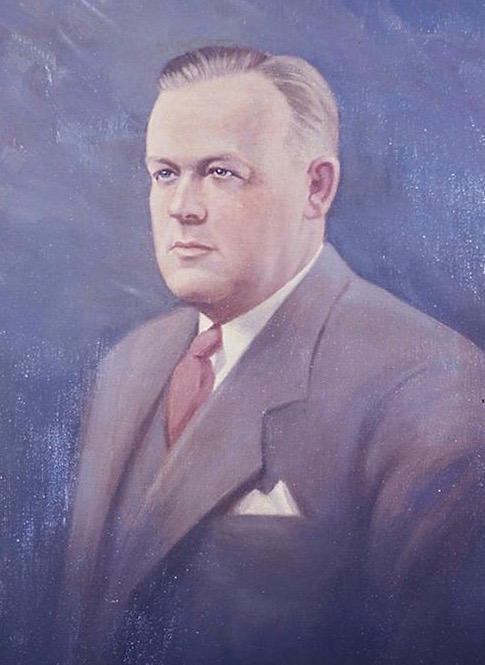
Nominee	Pat Harrison	Martin S. Conner
Party	Democratic	Democratic
Popular vote	128,729	65,296
Percentage	65.51%	33.23%
- County results Harrison: 40–50% 50–60% 60–70% 70–80% 80–90% Conner: 40–50% 50–60% 60–70%
U.S. senator before election
Pat Harrison
Democratic
Elected U.S. Senator
Pat Harrison
Democratic

1936 United States Senate election in Mississippi
Party	Candidate	Votes	%
Democratic	Pat Harrison (Incumbent)	140,570	100.00%
Democratic	Mike Conner	1	0.00%
Democratic	Frank Harper	1	0.00%
Majority		140,569	100.00%
Turnout		140,572	
Democratic hold			

== Montana ==
1936 United States Senate election in Montana
- November 3, 1936
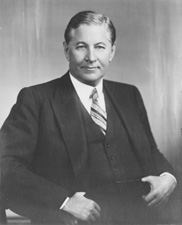

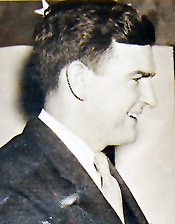
Nominee	James E. Murray	Thomas Larson	Joseph P. Monaghan
Party	Democratic	Republican	Independent
Popular vote	121,769	60,038	39,655
Percentage	54.98%	27.11%	17.91%
- County results Murray: 40–50% 50–60% 60–70% 70–80% Monaghan: 40–50% No Data/Vote: Tie: 40-50
U.S. senator before election
James E. Murray
Democratic
Elected U.S. Senator
James E. Murray
Democratic

1936 United States Senate election in Montana
Party	Candidate	Votes	%	±%
Democratic	James E. Murray (Incumbent)	121,769	54.98%	−4.68%
Republican	Thomas O. Larson	60,038	27.11%	−12.32%
Independent	Joseph P. Monaghan	39,655	17.91%	
Majority		61,731	27.87%	+7.65%
Turnout		221,462		
Democratic hold		Swing		

== Nebraska ==
1936 United States Senate election in Nebraska
- November 3, 1936
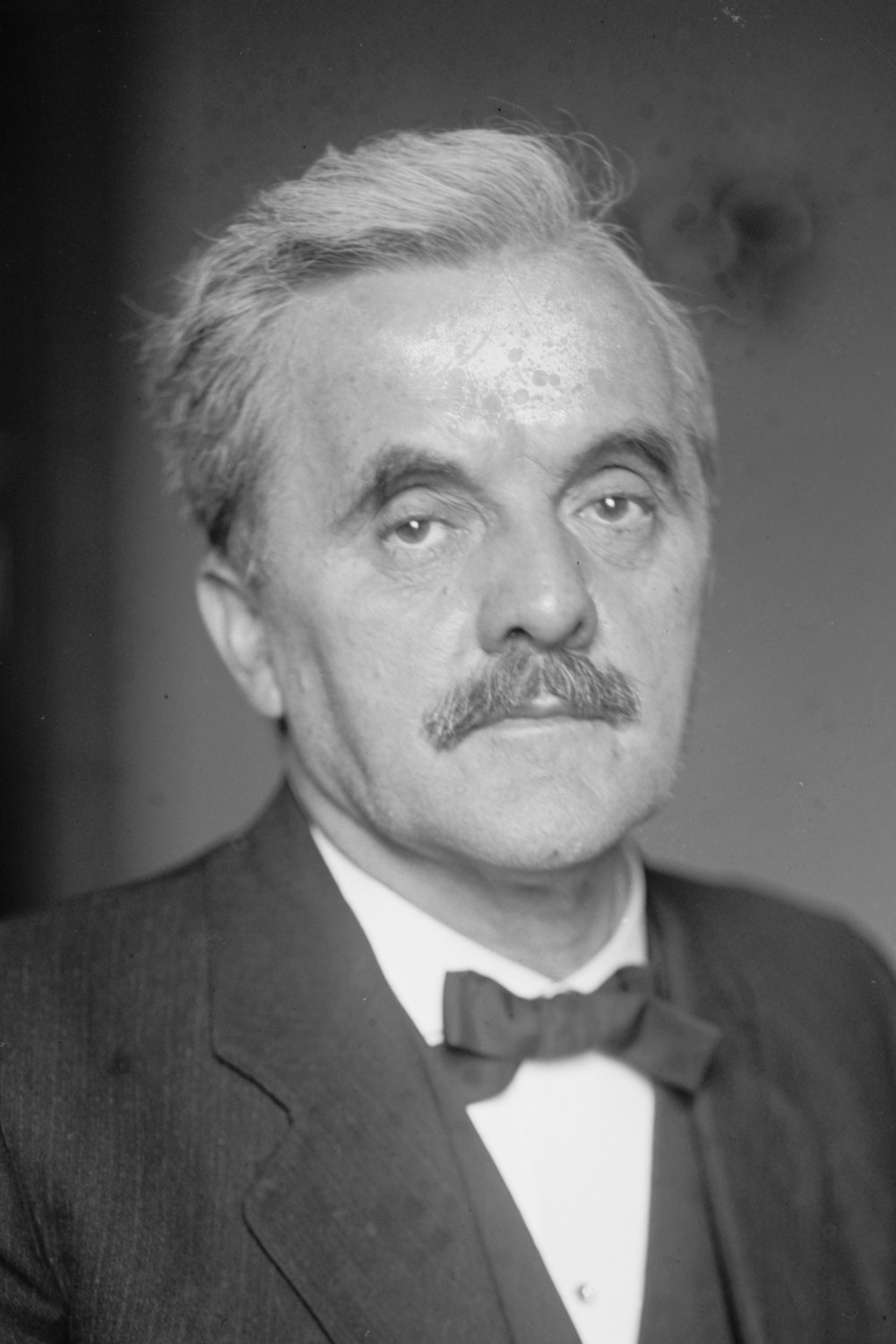

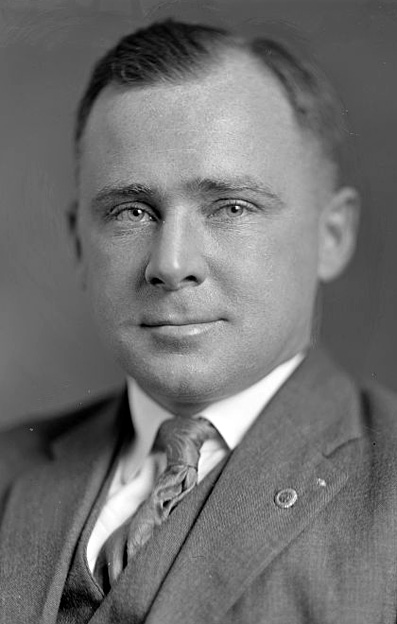

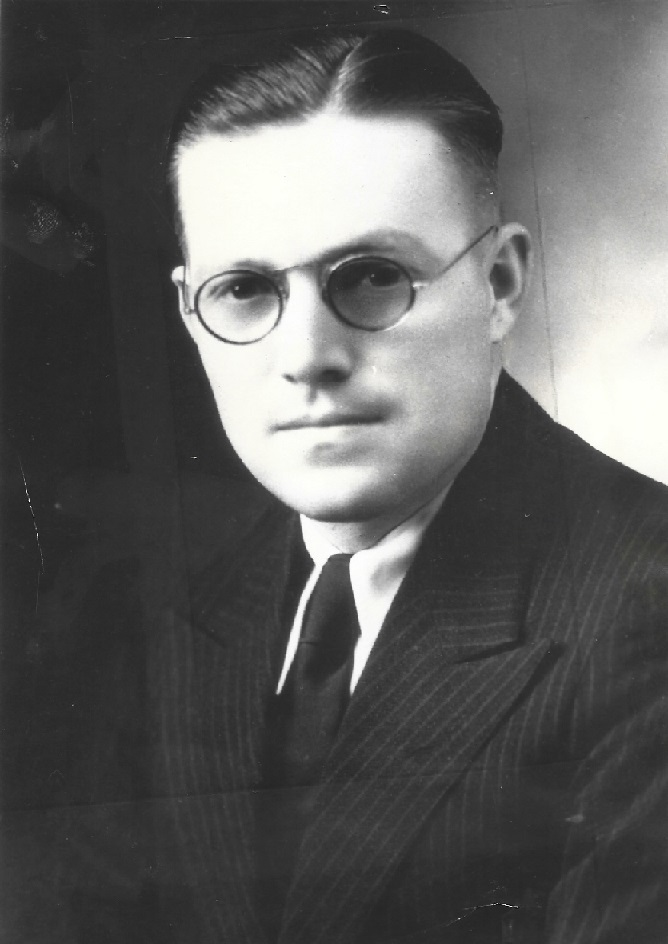
Nominee	George Norris	Robert Simmons	Terry Carpenter
Party	Independent	Republican	Democratic
Popular vote	258,700	223,276	108,391
Percentage	43.82%	37.82%	18.36%
County results
Norris
30–40%
40–50%
50–60%
60–70%
Simmons
30–40%
40–50%
50–60%
Carpenter
30–40%
40–50%
50–60%
60–70%
U.S. senator before election
George W. Norris
Independent
Elected U.S. Senator
George W. Norris
Independent

1936 United States Senate election in Nebraska
Party	Candidate	Votes	%
Independent	George W. Norris (Incumbent)	258,700	43.82%
Republican	Robert G. Simmons	223,276	37.82%
Democratic	Terry Carpenter	108,391	18.36%
Majority		35,424	6.00%
Turnout		590,367	
Independent gain from Republican			

== New Hampshire ==
1936 United States Senate election in New Hampshire
- November 3, 1936
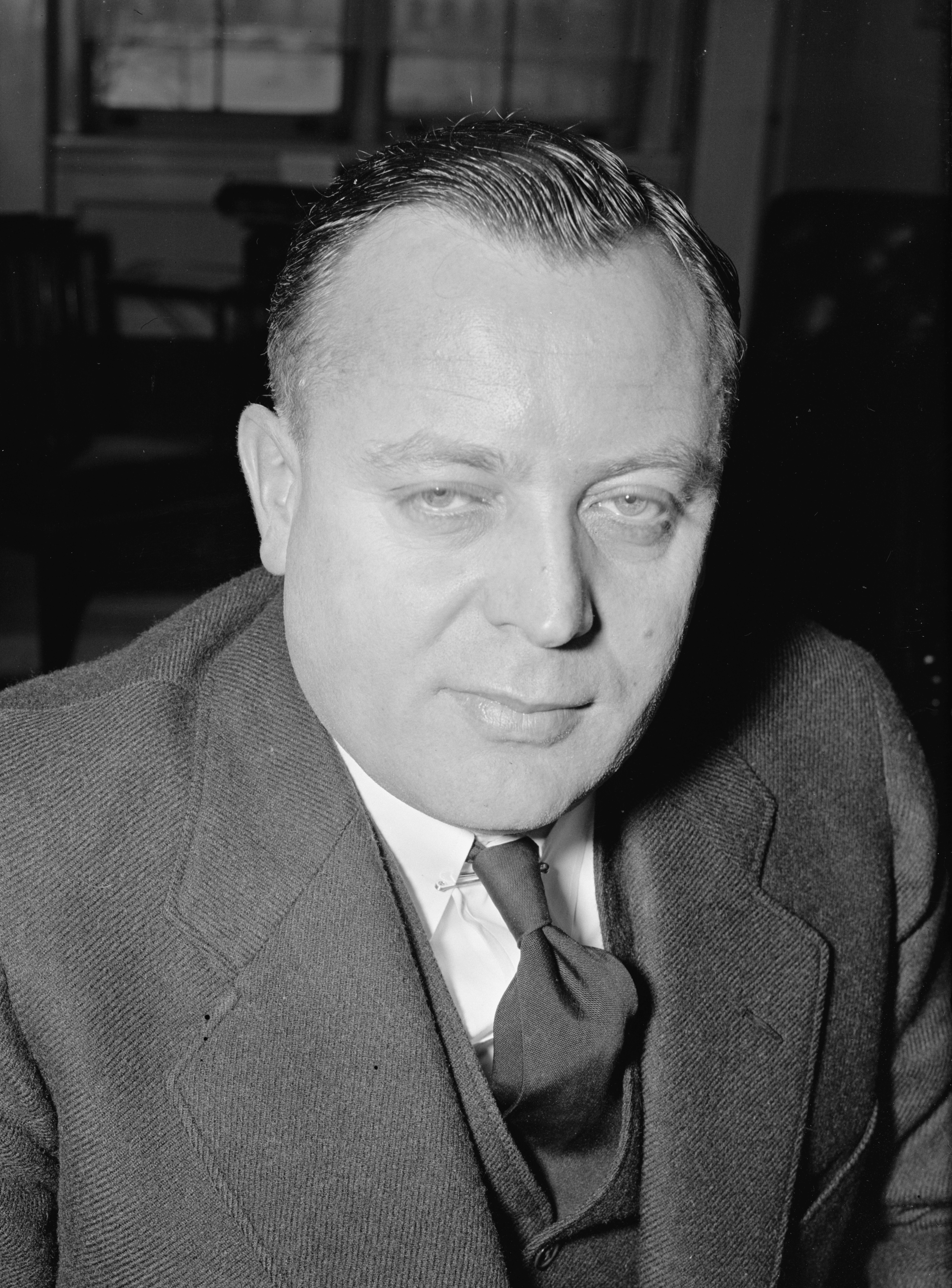

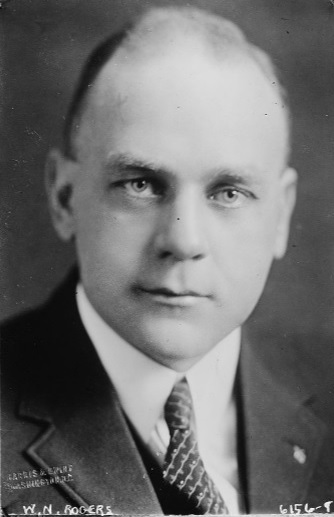
Nominee	Styles Bridges	William N. Rogers
Party	Republican	Democratic
Popular vote	107,923	99,195
Percentage	51.86%	47.67%
- Bridges: 50–60% 60–70% 70–80% 80–90% 90-100% Rogers: 50–60% 60–70% 70–80% 80–90%
U.S. senator before election
Henry W. Keyes
Republican
Elected U.S. Senator
Styles Bridges
Republican

1936 United States Senate election in New Hampshire
Party	Candidate	Votes	%
Republican	Styles Bridges	107,923	51.86%
Democratic	William Nathaniel Rogers	99,195	47.67%
Farmer–Labor	Stearns Morse	989	0.48%
Majority		8,728	4.19%
Turnout		208,107	
Republican hold			

== New Jersey ==
New Jersey election
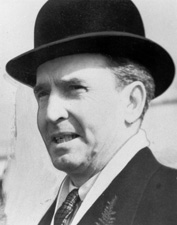

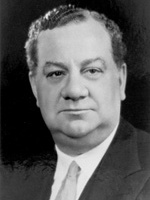
Nominee	William H. Smathers	William Warren Barbour
Party	Democratic	Republican
Popular vote	916,414	740,088
Percentage	54.90%	44.34%
- County results Smathers: 40–50% 50–60% 60–70% 70–80% Barbour: 50–60% 60–70%
U.S. senator before election
William Warren Barbour
Republican
Elected U.S. Senator
William H. Smathers
Democratic

1936 United States Senate election in New Jersey
Party	Candidate	Votes	%
Democratic	William H. Smathers	916,414	54.90%
Republican	William Warren Barbour (Incumbent)	740,088	44.34%
Townsend	Fred Turner	6,651	0.40%
Socialist	Herman F. Niessner	3,309	0.20%
Communist	Herbert Coley	1,414	0.08%
Prohibition	Malcolm G. Thomas	967	0.06%
Socialist Labor	George E. Bopp	448	0.03%
Majority		176,326	10.56%
Turnout		1,669,291	
Democratic gain from Republican			

== New Mexico ==
There were 2 elections, due to the May 6, 1935, death of two-term Republican Bronson M. Cutting.

=== New Mexico (special) ===
1936 United States Senate election in New Mexico
- November 3, 1936
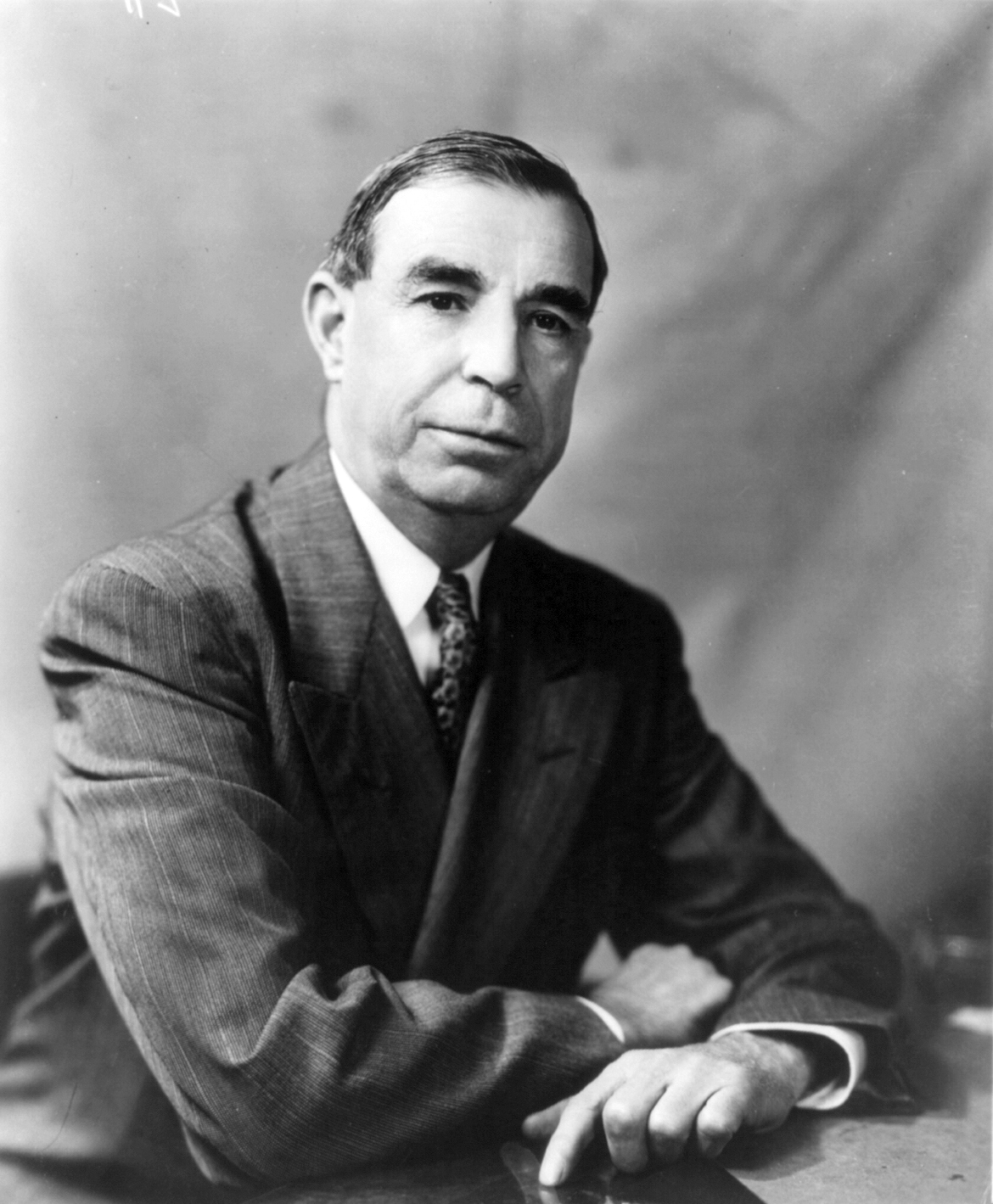

Nominee	Dennis Chávez	M. A. Otero Jr.
Party	Democratic	Republican
Popular vote	94,585	75,029
Percentage	55.74%	44.22%
- County results Chávez: 50–60% 60–70% 70–80% 80–90% Otero: 50–60%
U.S. senator before election
Dennis Chávez
Democratic
Elected U.S. Senator
Dennis Chávez
Democratic

Democratic former-Congressman Dennis Chavez had been Cutting's opponent in 1934. On May 11, 1935, after Cutting's death, Chavez was then appointed to continue Cutting's term, pending a special election which he then won.

New Mexico special election
Party	Candidate	Votes	%
Democratic	Dennis Chávez (Incumbent)	94,585	55.74%
Republican	M. A. Otero Jr.	75,029	44.22%
Farmer–Labor	Santiago El Mayor Matta	68	0.04%
Majority		19,556	11.52%
Turnout		169,438	
Democratic hold			

Chavez would be re-elected four more times and serve until his death in 1962.

=== New Mexico (regular) ===
1936 United States Senate election in New Mexico
- November 3, 1936
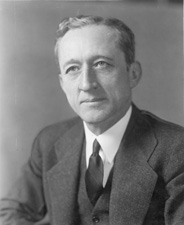
Nominee	Carl Hatch	Ernest W. Everly
Party	Democratic	Republican
Popular vote	104,550	64,817
Percentage	61.70%	38.25%
- County results Hatch: 50–60% 60–70% 70–80% 80–90% Everly: 50–60%
U.S. senator before election
Carl Hatch
Democratic
Elected U.S. Senator
Carl Hatch
Democratic

First-term Democrat Carl Hatch was easily re-elected.

New Mexico regular election
Party	Candidate	Votes	%
Democratic	Carl Hatch (Incumbent)	104,550	61.70%
Republican	Ernest W. Everly	64,817	38.25%
Farmer–Labor	W. C. Throp	71	0.04%
Majority		39,733	23.45%
Turnout		169,682	
Democratic hold			

Hatch would be re-elected once and serve until his 1948 retirement.

== North Carolina ==
1936 United States Senate election in North Carolina
- November 3, 1936
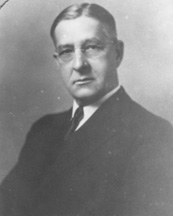

Nominee	Josiah Bailey	Frank C. Patton
Party	Democratic	Republican
Popular vote	563,968	233,009
Percentage	70.76%	29.24%
- County results Bailey: 50–60% 60–70% 70–80% 80–90% 90–100% Patton: 50–60% 60–70% 70–80%
Senator before election
Josiah Bailey
Democratic
Elected Senator
Josiah Bailey
Democratic

1936 United States Senate election in North Carolina
Party	Candidate	Votes	%
Democratic	Josiah Bailey (Incumbent)	563,968	70.76%
Republican	Frank C. Patton	233,009	29.24%
Majority		330,959	41.52%
Turnout		796,977	
Democratic hold			

== Oklahoma ==
1936 United States Senate election in Oklahoma
- November 3, 1936
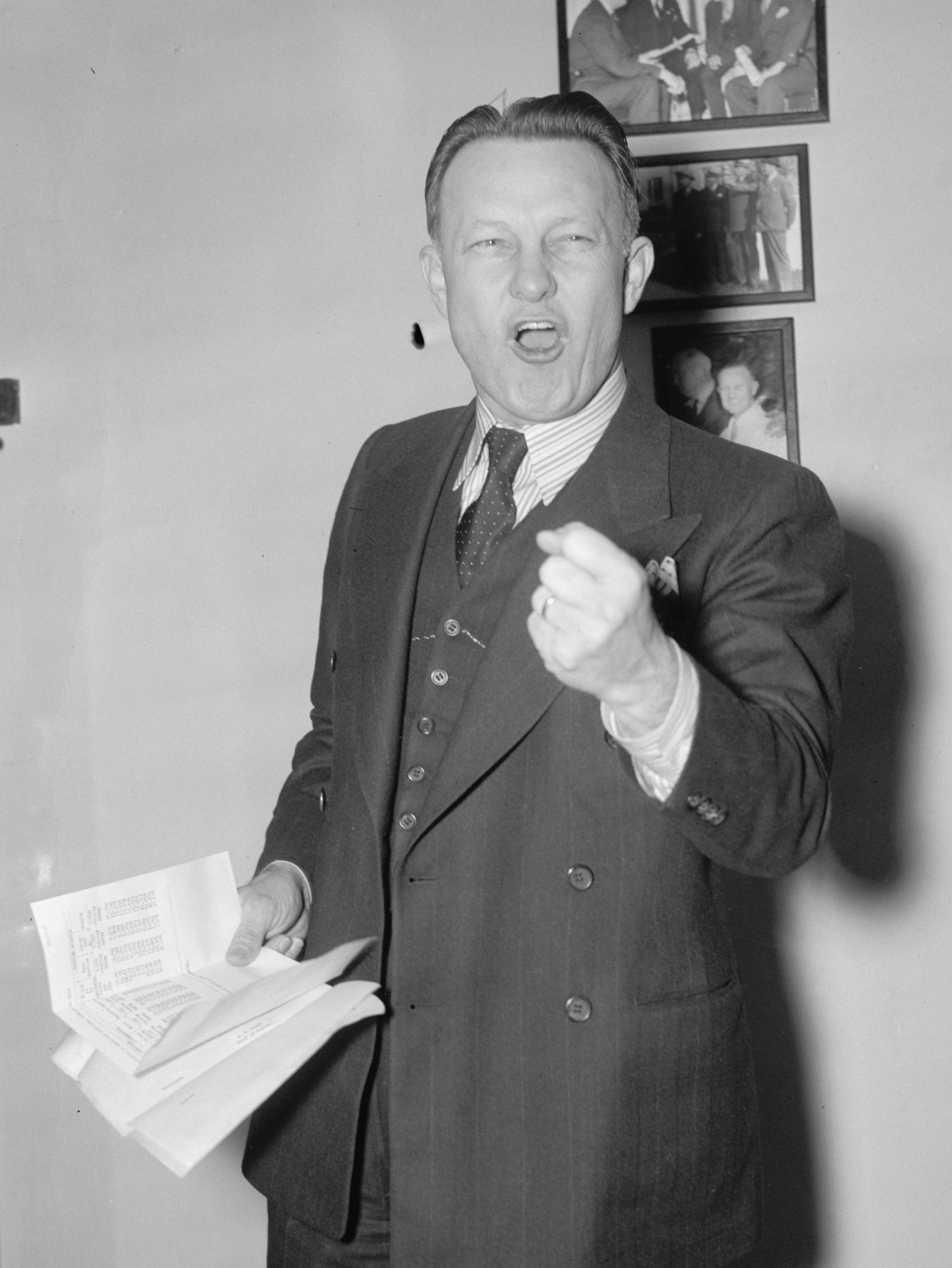

Nominee	Joshua B. Lee	Herbert K. Hyde
Party	Democratic	Republican
Popular vote	493,407	229,004
Percentage	67.97%	31.55%
- County results Lee: 50–60% 60–70% 70–80% 80–90% Hyde: 50–60%
U.S. senator before election
Thomas Gore
Democratic
Elected U.S. Senator
Joshua B. Lee
Democratic

1936 United States Senate election in Oklahoma
Party	Candidate	Votes	%
Democratic	Joshua B. Lee	493,407	67.97%
Republican	Herbert K. Hyde	229,004	31.55%
Socialist	Edgar Clemons	1,895	0.26%
Prohibition	P. C. Nelson	973	0.13%
Independent	Frank M. Kimes	344	0.05%
Independent	R. M. Funk	298	0.04%
Majority		264,403	36.42%
Turnout		725,921	
Democratic hold			

== Oregon ==
1936 United States Senate election in Oregon
- November 3, 1936
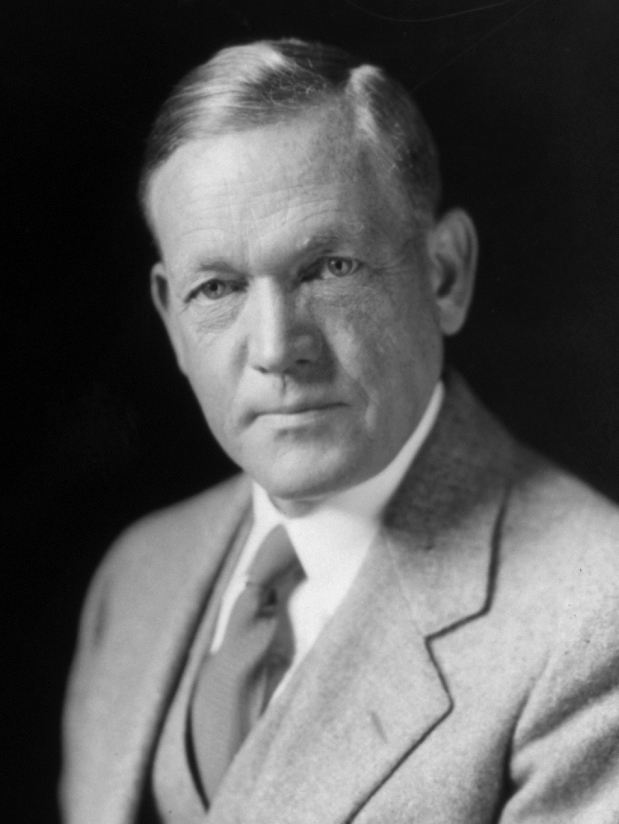

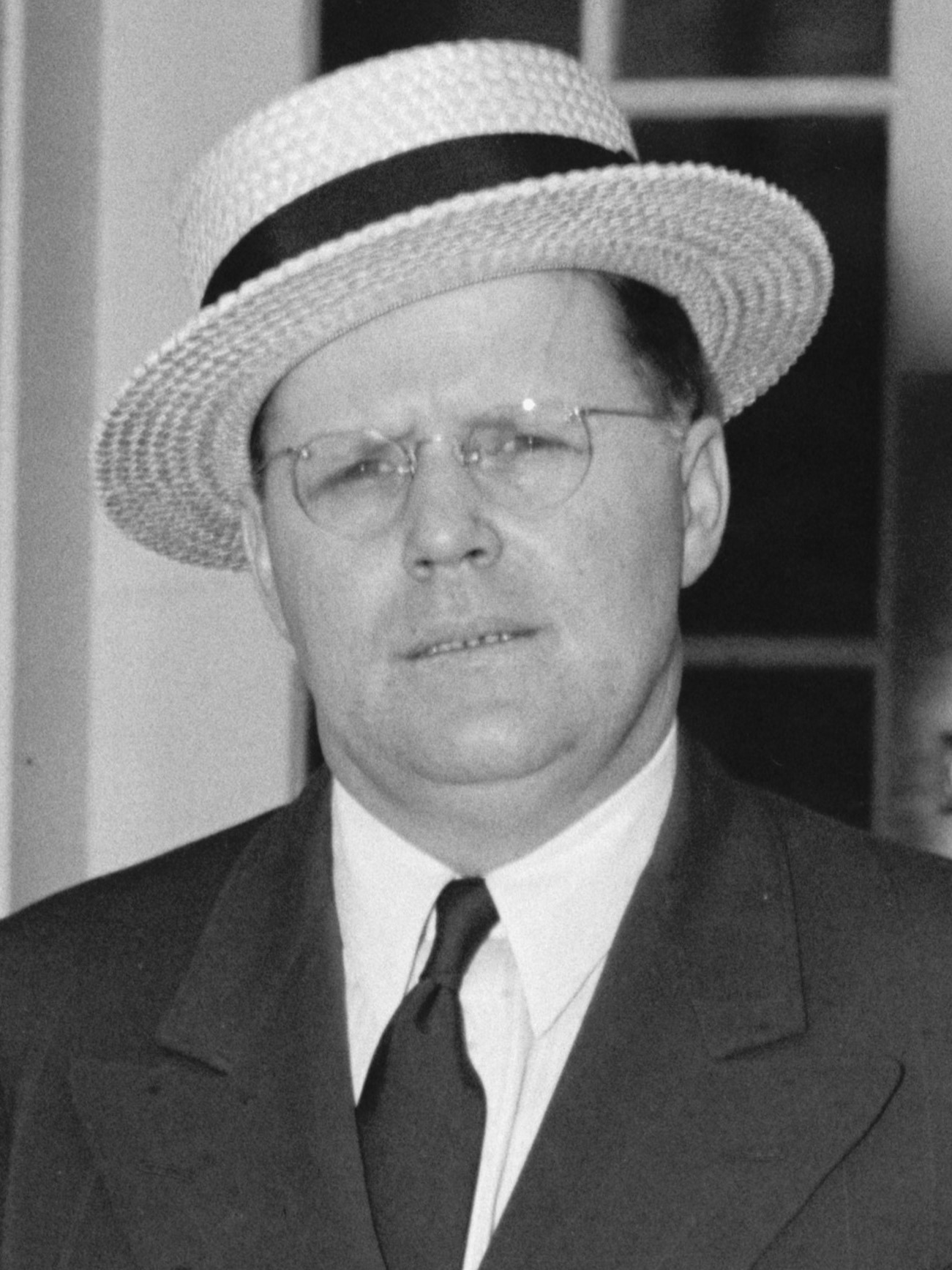
Nominee	Charles L. McNary	Willis Mahoney
Party	Republican	Democratic
Popular vote	199,332	193,822
Percentage	49.69%	48.32%
- County results McNary: 40–50% 50–60% 60–70% Mahoney: 40–50% 50–60%
Senator before election
Charles L. McNary
Republican
Elected Senator
Charles L. McNary
Republican

1936 United States Senate election in Oregon
Party	Candidate	Votes	%
Republican	Charles L. McNary (Incumbent)	199,332	49.69%
Democratic	Willis Mahoney	193,822	48.32%
Independent	Albert Streiff	3,134	0.78%
Socialist Labor	Eric Hass	2,886	0.72%
Independent	Clarence Rudder	1,956	0.49%
None	Scattering	1	0.00%
Majority		5,510	1.37%
Turnout		401,131	
Republican hold			

== Rhode Island ==
1936 United States Senate election in Rhode Island
Party	Candidate	Votes	%
Democratic	Theodore F. Green	149,141	48.62%
Republican	Jesse H. Metcalf (Incumbent)	136,125	44.37%
Independent	Ludger LaPointe	21,495	7.01%
Majority		13,016	4.35%
Turnout		306,761	
Democratic gain from Republican			

== South Carolina ==
1936 Democratic Senate primary in South Carolina
- September 6, 1936
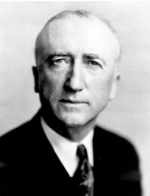

Nominee	James F. Byrnes	Thomas P. Stoney
Party	Democratic	Democratic
Popular vote	257,247	25,627
Percentage	87.08%	8.67%
- Results by county Byrnes: 50–60% 60–70% 70–80% 80–90% >90%
U.S. senator before election
James F. Byrnes
Democratic
Elected U.S. Senator
James F. Byrnes
Democratic

1936 South Carolina election
Party	Candidate	Votes	%	±%
Democratic	James F. Byrnes (Incumbent)	113,696	98.6	−1.4
Republican	Joseph Augustis Tolbert	961	0.8	N/A
Republican	Marion W. Seabrook	702	0.6	N/A
No party	Write-Ins	1	0.0	0.0
Majority		112,735	97.8	−2.2
Turnout		115,360		
Democratic hold				

== South Dakota ==
1936 United States Senate election in South Dakota
- November 3, 1936
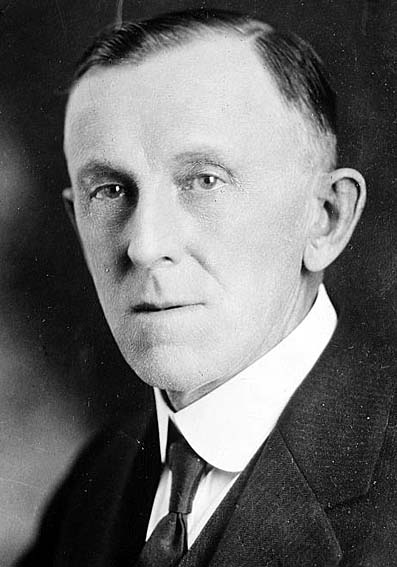

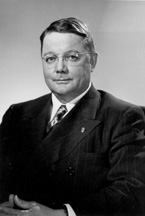
Nominee	William J. Bulow	Chan Gurney
Party	Democratic	Republican
Popular vote	141,509	135,461
Percentage	48.83%	46.75%
- County results Bulow: 40–50% 50–60% 60–70% Gurney: 40–50% 50–60% 60–70% No Vote
U.S. senator before election
William J. Bulow
Democratic
Elected U.S. Senator
William J. Bulow
Democratic

1936 United States Senate election in South Dakota
Party	Candidate	Votes	%
Democratic	William J. Bulow (Incumbent)	141,509	48.83%
Republican	John Chandler Gurney	135,461	46.75%
Independent	Arthur Bennett	12,816	4.42%
Majority		6,048	2.08%
Turnout		289,786	
Democratic hold			

== Tennessee ==
1936 United States Senate election in Tennessee
- November 3, 1936
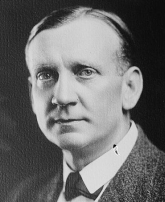

Nominee	Nathan L. Bachman	Dwayne D. Maddox
Party	Democratic	Republican
Popular vote	273,298	69,753
Percentage	75.88%	19.37%
Senator before election
Nathan L. Bachman
Democratic
Elected Senator
Nathan L. Bachman
Democratic

1936 United States Senate election in Tennessee
Party	Candidate	Votes	%
Democratic	Nathan L. Bachman (Incumbent)	273,298	75.88%
Republican	Dwayne D. Maddox	69,753	19.37%
Independent	John Randolph Neal Jr.	14,617	4.06%
Independent	Howard Kester	2,516	0.70%
Majority		203,545	56.51%
Turnout		360,184	
Democratic hold			

== Texas ==
Texas election
- November 3, 1936
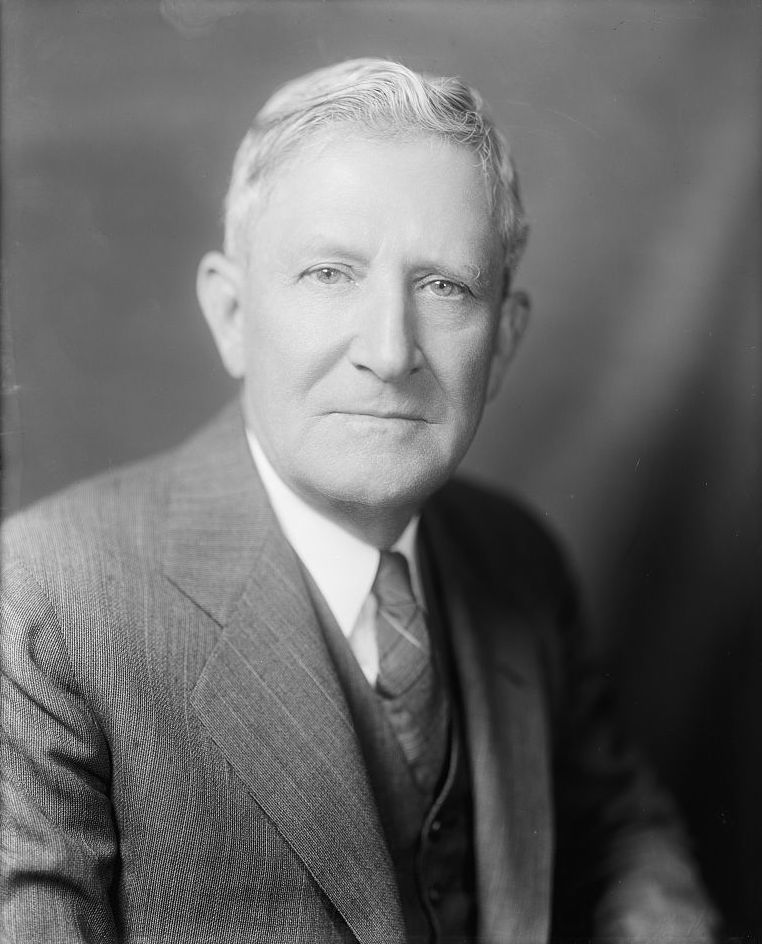

Nominee	Morris Sheppard	Carlos Watson
Party	Democratic	Republican
Popular vote	774,975	59,491
Percentage	92.56%	7.11%
- County Results Sheppard: 70–80% 80–90% >90% Watson: 40–50% 50–60% No vote
U.S. senator before election
Morris Sheppard
Democratic
Elected U.S. Senator
Morris Sheppard
Democratic

1936 United States Senate election in Texas
Party	Candidate	Votes	%	±%
Democratic	Morris Sheppard (incumbent)	774,975	92.56%	▲5.65
Republican	Carlos G. Watson	59,491	7.11%	▼5.62
Union	Gertrude Wilson	1,836	0.22%	N/A
Socialist	William Burr Starr	958	0.11%	▼0.15
Total votes		837,260	100.00%	
Democratic hold				

== Virginia ==
United States Senate election in Virginia, 1936
- November 3, 1936
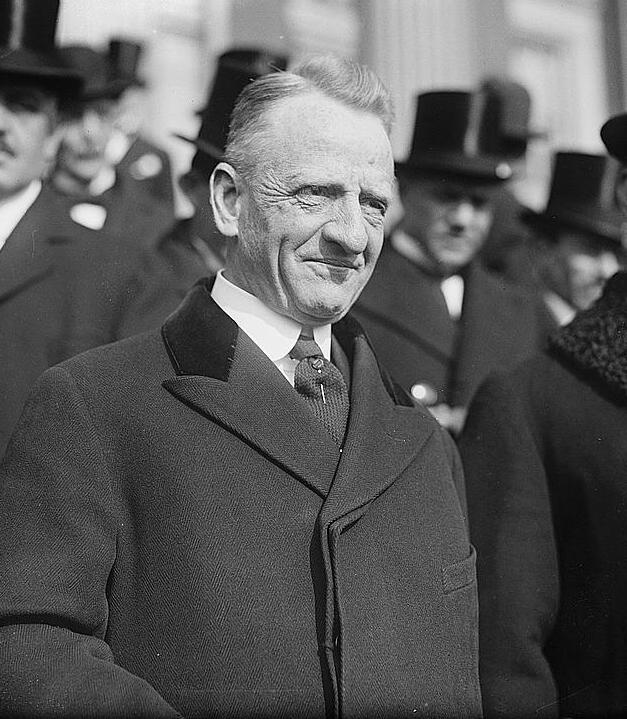
Nominee	Carter Glass
Party	Democratic
Popular vote	244,518
Percentage	91.66%
- County and independent city results Glass: 80–90% 90–100%
U.S. senator before election
Carter Glass
Democratic
Elected U.S. Senator
Carter Glass
Democratic

1936 United States Senate election in Virginia
Party	Candidate	Votes	%	±%
Democratic	Carter Glass (inc.)	244,518	91.66%	+14.99%
Republican	George Rohken	12,573	4.71%	+4.71%
Communist	Donald Burke	8,907	3.34%	+3.34%
Independent Democratic	Elbert Lee Trinkle	469	0.18%	−17.68%
Independent	A. J. Dunning	125	0.05%	
Write-ins		174	0.07%	+0.04%
Majority		231,945	86.95%	+28.14%
Turnout		266,766		
Democratic hold				

== West Virginia ==
1936 United States Senate election in West Virginia
- November 3, 1936
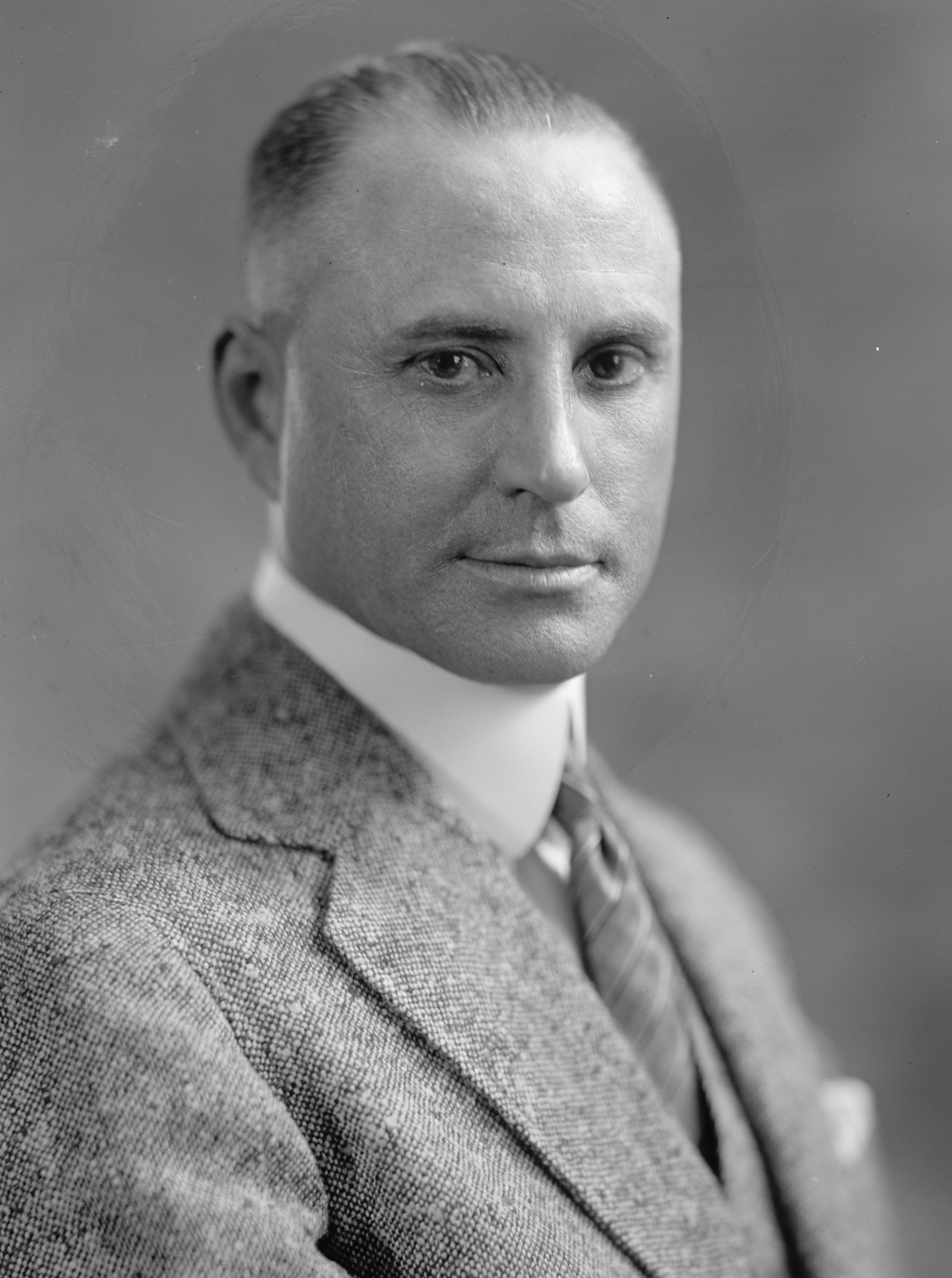

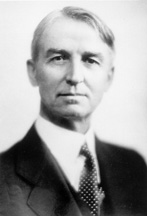
Nominee	Matthew M. Neely	Hugh Ike Shott
Party	Democratic	Republican
Popular vote	488,720	338,363
Percentage	58.95%	40.81%
- County results Neely: 50–60% 60–70% 70–80% Shott: 50–60% 60–70% 70–80%
U.S. senator before election
Matthew M. Neely
Democratic
Elected U.S. Senator
Matthew M. Neely
Democratic

1936 United States Senate election in West Virginia
Party	Candidate	Votes	%
Democratic	Matthew M. Neely (Incumbent)	488,720	58.95%
Republican	Hugh Ike Shott	338,363	40.81%
Prohibition	John Wesley MacDonald	1,005	0.12%
Socialist	J. H. Snider	935	0.11%
Majority		150,357	18.14%
Turnout		829,023	
Democratic hold			

== Wyoming ==
1936 United States Senate election in Wyoming
- November 3, 1936
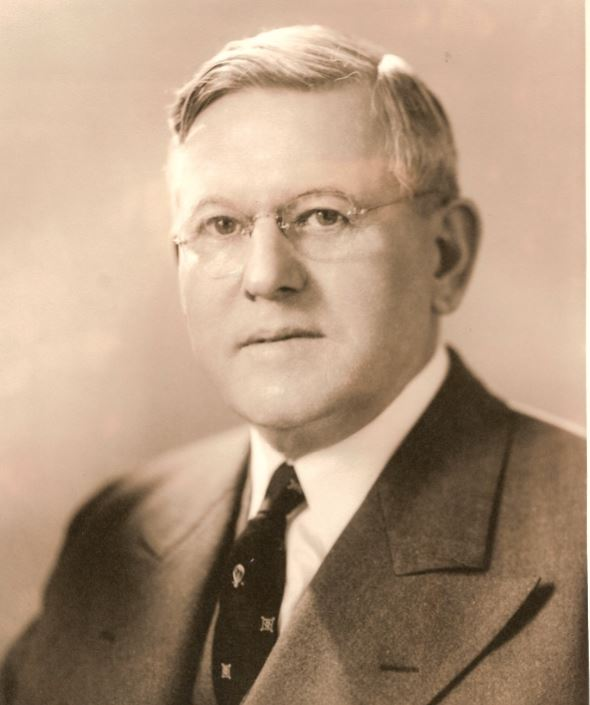

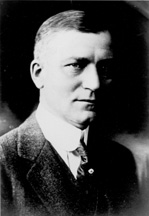
Nominee	Harry Schwartz	Robert D. Carey
Party	Democratic	Republican
Popular vote	53,919	45,483
Percentage	53.83%	45.40%
- County results Schwartz: 50–60% 60–70% 70–80% Carey: 50–60% 60–70%
U.S. senator before election
Robert D. Carey
Republican
Elected U.S. Senator
Harry Schwartz
Democratic

1936 United States Senate election in Wyoming
Party	Candidate	Votes	%
Democratic	Henry H. Schwartz	53,919	53.83%
Republican	Robert D. Carey (Incumbent)	45,483	45.40%
Union	George E. Geier	682	0.68%
Communist	Merton Willer	88	0.09%
Majority		8,436	8.43%
Turnout		100,172	
Democratic gain from Republican			

== See also ==
- 1936 United States elections
  - 1936 United States presidential election
  - 1936 United States House of Representatives elections
- 74th United States Congress
- 75th United States Congress
