= 1936 United States Senate special elections in Florida =

There were two United States Senate special elections in Florida in 1936:

- 1936 United States Senate special election in Florida (Class 1)
- 1936 United States Senate special election in Florida (Class 3)
