= Moses H. Gulesian =

Armenian-American businessman

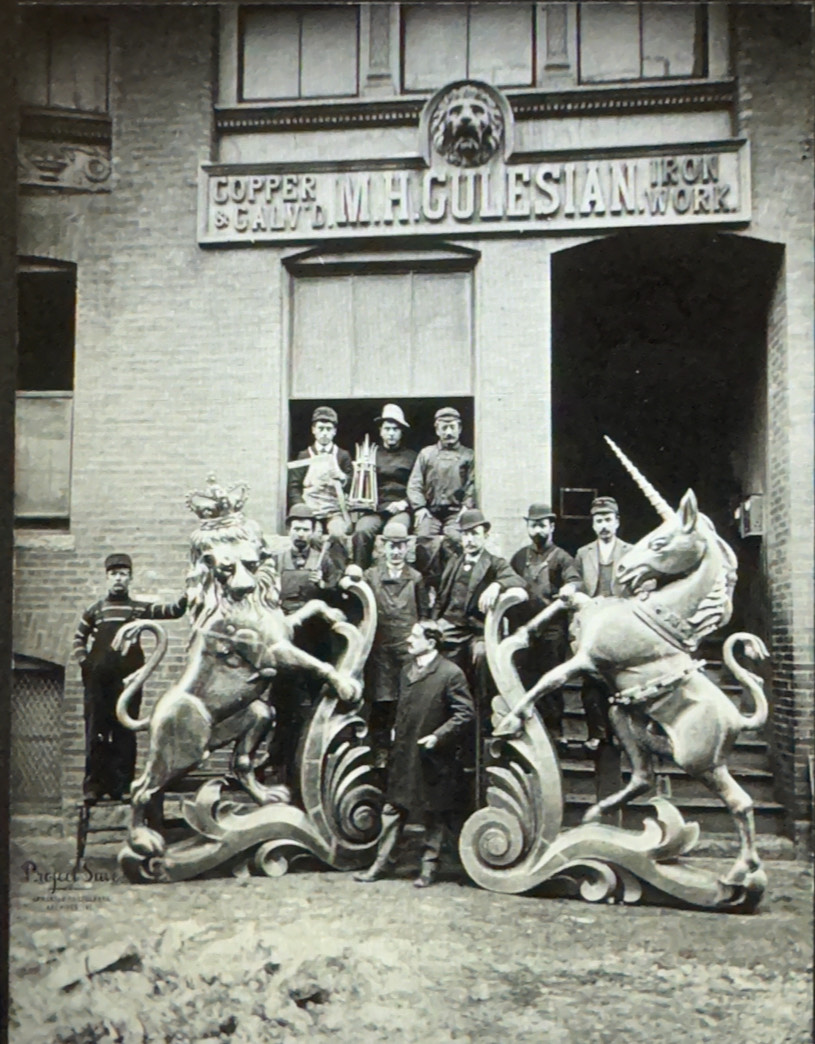
Moses Gulesian, center front, copper-works owner, with his staff and their cast of the lion and unicorn for the Old State House. 1901, Boston, Massachusetts

Moses H. Gulesian (April 10, 1855 – July 13, 1951) was an Armenian-American businessman. He was born in Marash in the Ottoman Empire. Seeking better opportunities and escaping persecution, Gulesian emigrated to the United States in 1883, where he would go on to become a successful entrepreneur and a notable philanthropist. He is well known for offering to buy the USS Constitution to avoid its destruction which sparked a wave of patriotism which later prompted the initiative to keep the ship and rebuild it.

== Background ==
Moses H. Gulesian married Anna Torosian, also of Armenian descent, and the couple had four children. Upon arriving in the United States, Gulesian settled in Worcester, Massachusetts, where he initially worked in a factory. Demonstrating a keen business acumen and a tireless work ethic, he quickly moved up the ranks and soon ventured into entrepreneurship. Gulesian founded a successful metalworking company, which specialized in manufacturing fine brass and copper products. His business, M.H. Gulesian & Sons, gained a reputation for high-quality craftsmanship and innovation, supplying products to various industries, including electrical, architectural, and industrial sectors.

Gulesian's entry in the Biographical History of Massachusetts notes, "Here is another instance of American patriotism shown by Mr. Gulesian: fourteen years ago, when, authorized by the city of Boston, he made the lion and unicorn of copper to replace the historic ones on the Old State House, he bought the old ones to ensure their preservation, and today they adorn the lawn in front of his house."

Gulesian was known to help the Red Cross Society. He also spoke widely about the Armenian massacres from 1894 to 1896, during which many Armenians were indiscriminately massacred under Turkish rule.

In 1905, Secretary of the Navy Charles Joseph Bonaparte suggested that Constitution be towed out to sea and used as target practice, after which she would be allowed to sink. Moses H. Gulesian read about this in a Boston newspaper; he was a businessman from Worcester, Massachusetts, and he offered to purchase her for $10,000. The State Department refused, but Gulesian initiated a public campaign which began from Boston and ultimately "spilled all over the country." The storms of protest from the public prompted Congress to authorize $100,000 in 1906 for the ship's restoration. First to be removed was the barracks structure on her spar deck, but the limited amount of funds allowed just a partial restoration. In an interview with The Boston Journal he said, "My only intention in making this offer of $10,000 for the old Constitution was to save her from such a horrible end as being used as a target. If it is a question of price, I will raise my offer to $15,000." The navy refused the offer, but later it sparked a campaign, and more than 30,000 people signed a petition to save the ship. Later, the US government approved funds to have it repaired.

Moses H. Gulesian died on July 13, 1951, in Worcester, Massachusetts.
