= 1940 Florida gubernatorial election =

1940 Florida Democratic gubernatorial runoff
- May 28, 1940
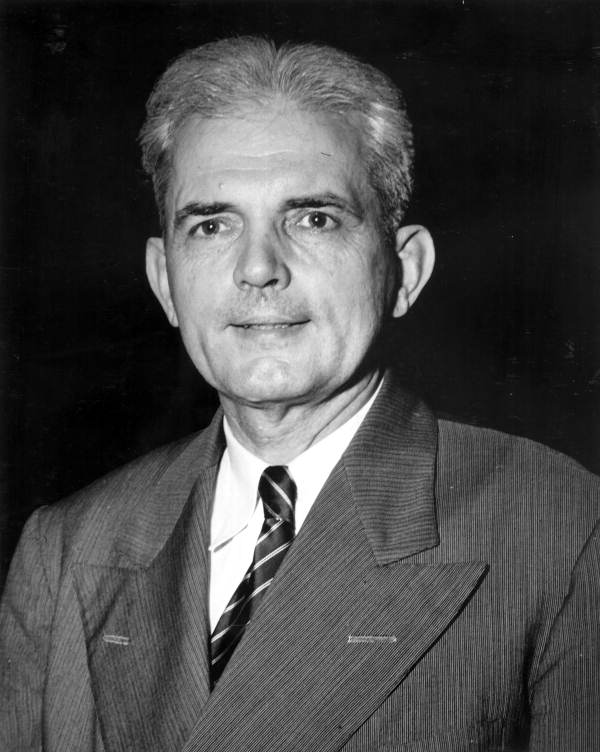

Nominee	Spessard Holland	Francis P. Whitehair
Party	Democratic	Democratic
Popular vote	272,718	206,158
Percentage	56.95%	43.05%
- County results Holland: 50–60% 60–70% 70–80% Whitehair: 50–60%
Governor before election
Fred P. Cone
Democratic
Elected Governor
Spessard Holland
Democratic

The 1940 Florida gubernatorial election was held on November 5, 1940. Incumbent Governor Fred P. Cone was term-limited. Democratic nominee Spessard Holland was elected unopposed.

== Primary elections ==
Primary elections were held on May 7, 1940, with the Democratic runoff held on May 28, 1940.

=== Democratic primary ===
==== Results ====
Democratic primary results
Party	Candidate	Votes	%
Democratic	Spessard Holland	118,962	24.71
Democratic	Francis P. Whitehair	95,431	19.82
Democratic	Fuller Warren	83,316	17.31
Democratic	B. F. Paty	75,608	15,71
Democratic	Walter B. Fraser	36,855	7.66
Democratic	James Barbee	33,699	7.00
Democratic	Hans Walker	21,666	4.50
Democratic	Burton Schoepf	8,055	1.67
Democratic	Frederick Van Roy	2,716	0.56
Democratic	J. H. Clancey	2,703	0.56
Democratic	Carl Maples	2,426	0.50
Total votes		481,437	100.00

Democratic primary runoff results
Party	Candidate	Votes	%
Democratic	Spessard Holland	272,718	56.95
Democratic	Francis P. Whitehair	206,158	43.05
Total votes		478,876	100.00

== General election ==
=== Candidates ===
- Spessard Holland, Democratic

There was no Republican candidate.

=== Results ===
1940 Florida gubernatorial election
Party	Candidate	Votes	%	±%
Democratic	Spessard Holland	334,152	100.00%	
Turnout		334,152	100.00%	
Democratic hold		Swing		

== Bibliography ==
- Morris, Allen (1965). The Florida Handbook, 1965-66. Tallahassee, FL: The Peninsular Publishing Company.
- Glashan, Roy R. (1979). American Governors and Gubernatorial Elections, 1775-1978. Meckler Books. ISBN 0-930466-17-9.
- Gubernatorial Elections, 1787-1997. Washington, D.C.: Congressional Quarterly Inc. 1998. ISBN 1-56802-396-0.
