= 1936 United States Senate special election in Florida (Class 1) =

1936 Florida U.S. Senate special election
- November 3, 1936
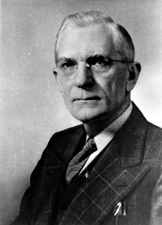

Nominee	Charles O. Andrews	Howard C. Babcock
Party	Democratic	Republican
Popular vote	241,528	57,016
Percentage	80.90%	19.10%
- Results by county Andrews: 60–70% 70–80% 80–90% >90%
U.S. senator before election
Scott Marion Loftin
Democratic
Elected U.S. Senator
Charles O. Andrews
Democratic

The 1936 United States Senate special election in Florida was held on November 3, 1936. Charles O. Andrews was easily elected to fill the seat.

== Background ==
After incumbent Senator Park Trammell died, Scott Marion Loftin was appointed to serve until the November 1936 election.

== Democratic primary ==
The Democratic primary was held on August 11, 1936.

=== Candidates ===
- Charles O. Andrews, former State Representative from Orlando
- Doyle E. Carlton, former Governor of Florida and State Senator

=== Results ===
Democratic primary results
Party	Candidate	Votes	%
Democratic	Charles O. Andrews	67,387	51.87%
Democratic	Doyle E. Carlton	62,530	48.13%
Total votes		129,917	100.00%

== General election ==
=== Results ===
General election results
Party	Candidate	Votes	%	±%
Democratic	Charles O. Andrews	241,528	80.90%	▼19.10
Republican	Howard C. Babcock	57,016	19.10%	▲19.10
Total votes		298,544	100.00%	

== See also ==
- 1936 United States Senate elections
