= List of United States senators from Florida =

Current delegation

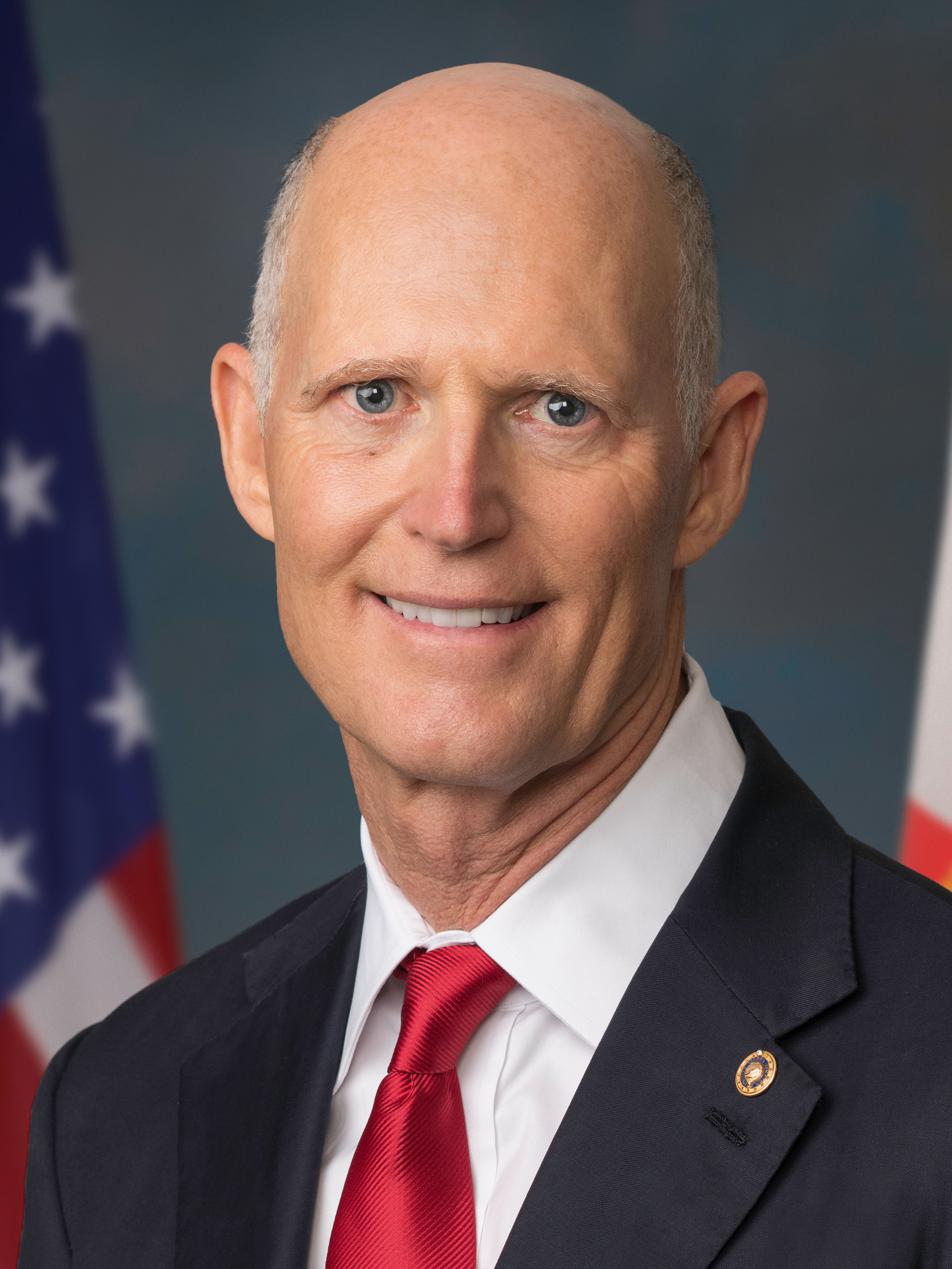
Rick Scott (R)

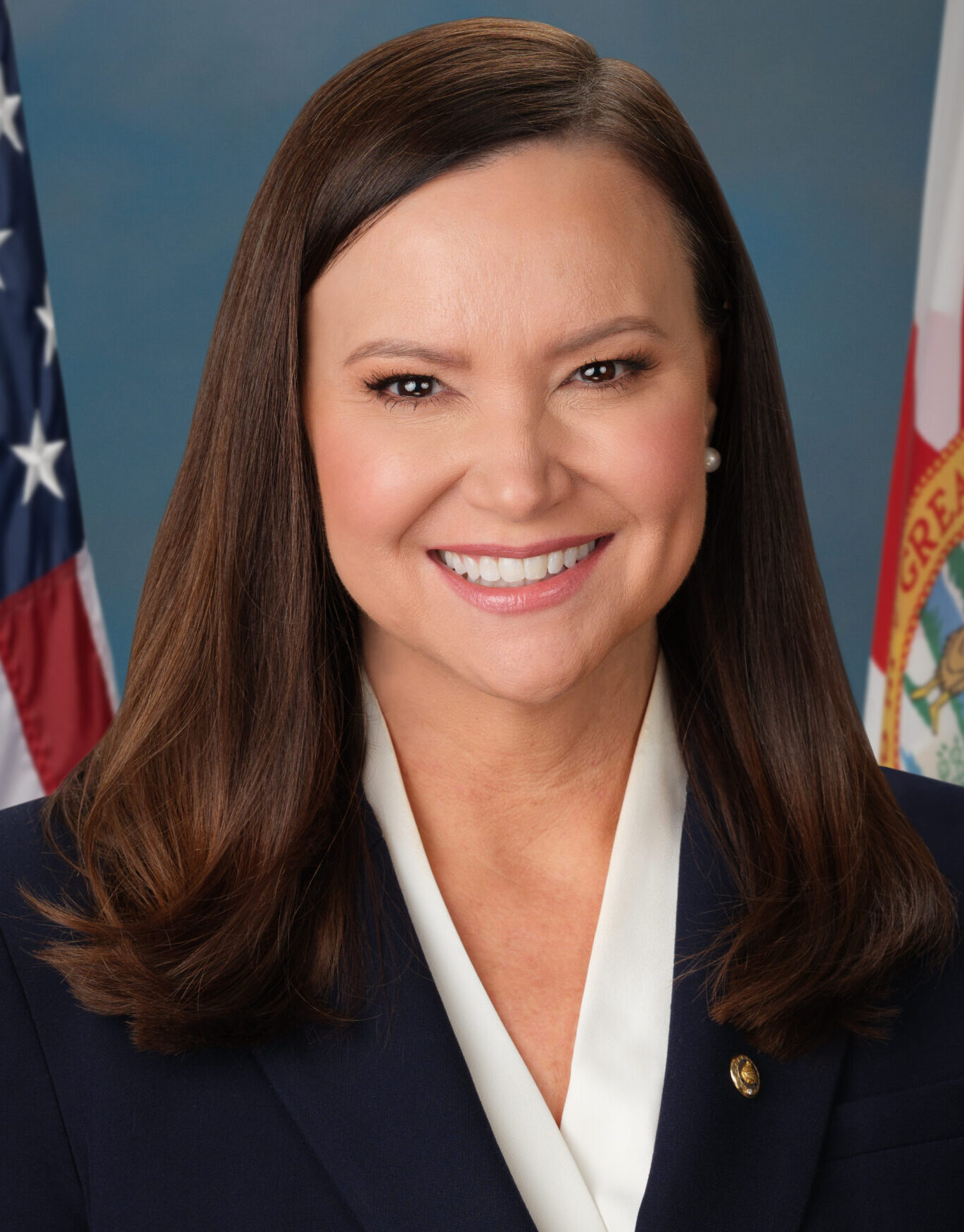
Ashley Moody (R)

(ordered by seniority)

Florida was admitted to the Union on March 3, 1845, and elects its U.S. senators to class 1 and class 3. Florida's U.S. Senate seats were declared vacant in March 1861, due to its secession from the Union. They were filled again in July 1868. The state is currently represented by Rick Scott (serving since 2019) and Ashley Moody (serving since 2025). After Scott's 2018 election, Florida has been represented by two Republican senators for the first time since Reconstruction. Duncan U. Fletcher was Florida's longest-serving senator (1909–1936).

== List of senators ==
Class 1 Class 1 senators belong to the electoral cycle that most recently had regular elections in 2006, 2012, 2018, and 2024. The next election will be in 2030.						C	Class 3 Class 3 senators belong to the electoral cycle that most recently had regular elections in 2004, 2010, 2016, and 2022. The next election will be in 2028.					
#	Senator	Party	Dates in office	Electoral history	T	C	T	Electoral history	Dates in office	Party	Senator	#
1	David Levy Yulee (Fernandina Beach)	Democratic	Jul 1, 1845 – Mar 3, 1851	Elected in 1845. Lost re-election.	1	29th	1	Elected in 1845. Retired.	Jul 1, 1845 – Mar 3, 1849	Democratic	James Westcott (Tallahassee)	1
1	David Levy Yulee (Fernandina Beach)	Democratic	Jul 1, 1845 – Mar 3, 1851	Elected in 1845. Lost re-election.	1	30th	1	Elected in 1845. Retired.	Jul 1, 1845 – Mar 3, 1849	Democratic	James Westcott (Tallahassee)	1
1	David Levy Yulee (Fernandina Beach)	Democratic	Jul 1, 1845 – Mar 3, 1851	Elected in 1845. Lost re-election.	1	31st	2	Elected in 1848. Retired.	Mar 4, 1849 – Mar 3, 1855	Whig	Jackson Morton (Pensacola)	2
2	Stephen Mallory (Pensacola)	Democratic	Mar 4, 1851 – Jan 21, 1861	Elected in 1851.	2	32nd	2	Elected in 1848. Retired.	Mar 4, 1849 – Mar 3, 1855	Whig	Jackson Morton (Pensacola)	2
2	Stephen Mallory (Pensacola)	Democratic	Mar 4, 1851 – Jan 21, 1861	Elected in 1851.	2	33rd	2	Elected in 1848. Retired.	Mar 4, 1849 – Mar 3, 1855	Whig	Jackson Morton (Pensacola)	2
2	Stephen Mallory (Pensacola)	Democratic	Mar 4, 1851 – Jan 21, 1861	Elected in 1851.	2	34th	3	Elected in 1855. Withdrew.	Mar 4, 1855 – Jan 21, 1861	Democratic	David Levy Yulee (Homosassa)	3
2	Stephen Mallory (Pensacola)	Democratic	Mar 4, 1851 – Jan 21, 1861	Re-elected in 1857. Withdrew.	3	35th	3	Elected in 1855. Withdrew.	Mar 4, 1855 – Jan 21, 1861	Democratic	David Levy Yulee (Homosassa)	3
2	Stephen Mallory (Pensacola)	Democratic	Mar 4, 1851 – Jan 21, 1861	Re-elected in 1857. Withdrew.	3	36th	3	Elected in 1855. Withdrew.	Mar 4, 1855 – Jan 21, 1861	Democratic	David Levy Yulee (Homosassa)	3
Vacant			Jan 21, 1861 – Jun 17, 1868	Civil War and Reconstruction.	3	36th	3	Civil War and Reconstruction.	Jan 21, 1861 – Jun 25, 1868	Vacant		
Vacant			Jan 21, 1861 – Jun 17, 1868	Civil War and Reconstruction.	3	37th	4	Civil War and Reconstruction.	Jan 21, 1861 – Jun 25, 1868	Vacant		
Vacant			Jan 21, 1861 – Jun 17, 1868	Civil War and Reconstruction.	4	38th	4	Civil War and Reconstruction.	Jan 21, 1861 – Jun 25, 1868	Vacant		
Vacant			Jan 21, 1861 – Jun 17, 1868	Civil War and Reconstruction.	4	39th	4	Civil War and Reconstruction.	Jan 21, 1861 – Jun 25, 1868	Vacant		
Vacant			Jan 21, 1861 – Jun 17, 1868	Civil War and Reconstruction.	4	40th	5	Civil War and Reconstruction.	Jan 21, 1861 – Jun 25, 1868	Vacant		
3	Adonijah Welch (Jacksonville)	Republican	Jun 17, 1868 – Mar 3, 1869	Elected to finish term. Retired.	4	40th	5	Civil War and Reconstruction.	Jan 21, 1861 – Jun 25, 1868	Vacant		
3	Adonijah Welch (Jacksonville)	Republican	Jun 17, 1868 – Mar 3, 1869	Elected to finish term. Retired.	4	40th	5	Elected to finish term. Retired.	Jun 25, 1868 – Mar 3, 1873	Republican	Thomas W. Osborn (Pensacola)	4
4	Abijah Gilbert (St. Augustine)	Republican	Mar 4, 1869 – Mar 3, 1875	Elected in 1868 or 1869. Retired.	5	41st	5	Elected to finish term. Retired.	Jun 25, 1868 – Mar 3, 1873	Republican	Thomas W. Osborn (Pensacola)	4
4	Abijah Gilbert (St. Augustine)	Republican	Mar 4, 1869 – Mar 3, 1875	Elected in 1868 or 1869. Retired.	5	42nd	5	Elected to finish term. Retired.	Jun 25, 1868 – Mar 3, 1873	Republican	Thomas W. Osborn (Pensacola)	4
4	Abijah Gilbert (St. Augustine)	Republican	Mar 4, 1869 – Mar 3, 1875	Elected in 1868 or 1869. Retired.	5	43rd	6	Elected in 1872 or 1873. Retired.	Mar 4, 1873 – Mar 3, 1879	Republican	Simon B. Conover (Tallahassee)	5
5	Charles W. Jones (Pensacola)	Democratic	Mar 4, 1875 – Mar 3, 1887	Elected in 1875.	6	44th	6	Elected in 1872 or 1873. Retired.	Mar 4, 1873 – Mar 3, 1879	Republican	Simon B. Conover (Tallahassee)	5
5	Charles W. Jones (Pensacola)	Democratic	Mar 4, 1875 – Mar 3, 1887	Elected in 1875.	6	45th	6	Elected in 1872 or 1873. Retired.	Mar 4, 1873 – Mar 3, 1879	Republican	Simon B. Conover (Tallahassee)	5
5	Charles W. Jones (Pensacola)	Democratic	Mar 4, 1875 – Mar 3, 1887	Elected in 1875.	6	46th	7	Elected in 1879.	Mar 4, 1879 – Mar 3, 1891	Democratic	Wilkinson Call (Jacksonville)	6
5	Charles W. Jones (Pensacola)	Democratic	Mar 4, 1875 – Mar 3, 1887	Re-elected in 1881. Retired.	7	47th	7	Elected in 1879.	Mar 4, 1879 – Mar 3, 1891	Democratic	Wilkinson Call (Jacksonville)	6
5	Charles W. Jones (Pensacola)	Democratic	Mar 4, 1875 – Mar 3, 1887	Re-elected in 1881. Retired.	7	48th	7	Elected in 1879.	Mar 4, 1879 – Mar 3, 1891	Democratic	Wilkinson Call (Jacksonville)	6
5	Charles W. Jones (Pensacola)	Democratic	Mar 4, 1875 – Mar 3, 1887	Re-elected in 1881. Retired.	7	49th	8	Elected in 1885.	Mar 4, 1879 – Mar 3, 1891	Democratic	Wilkinson Call (Jacksonville)	6
Vacant			Mar 4, 1887 – May 19, 1887		8	50th	8	Elected in 1885.	Mar 4, 1879 – Mar 3, 1891	Democratic	Wilkinson Call (Jacksonville)	6
6	Samuel Pasco (Monticello)	Democratic	May 19, 1887 – Apr 18, 1899	Elected late to finish term in 1887.	8	50th	8	Elected in 1885.	Mar 4, 1879 – Mar 3, 1891	Democratic	Wilkinson Call (Jacksonville)	6
6	Samuel Pasco (Monticello)	Democratic	May 19, 1887 – Apr 18, 1899	Elected late to finish term in 1887.	8	51st	8	Elected in 1885.	Mar 4, 1879 – Mar 3, 1891	Democratic	Wilkinson Call (Jacksonville)	6
6	Samuel Pasco (Monticello)	Democratic	May 19, 1887 – Apr 18, 1899	Elected late to finish term in 1887.	8	52nd	9	Legislature failed to elect.	Mar 4, 1891 – May 26, 1891	Vacant		6
6	Samuel Pasco (Monticello)	Democratic	May 19, 1887 – Apr 18, 1899	Elected late to finish term in 1887.	8	52nd	9	Elected late in 1891. Retired.	May 26, 1891 – Mar 3, 1897	Democratic	Wilkinson Call (Jacksonville)	6
6	Samuel Pasco (Monticello)	Democratic	May 19, 1887 – Apr 18, 1899	Appointed to begin next term as legislature had failed to elect. Elected in 1893 to finish term.	9	53rd	9	Elected late in 1891. Retired.	May 26, 1891 – Mar 3, 1897	Democratic	Wilkinson Call (Jacksonville)	6
6	Samuel Pasco (Monticello)	Democratic	May 19, 1887 – Apr 18, 1899	Appointed to begin next term as legislature had failed to elect. Elected in 1893 to finish term.	9	54th	9	Elected late in 1891. Retired.	May 26, 1891 – Mar 3, 1897	Democratic	Wilkinson Call (Jacksonville)	6
6	Samuel Pasco (Monticello)	Democratic	May 19, 1887 – Apr 18, 1899	Appointed to begin next term as legislature had failed to elect. Elected in 1893 to finish term.	9	55th	10	Legislature failed to elect.	Mar 4, 1897 – May 13, 1897	Vacant		
6	Samuel Pasco (Monticello)	Democratic	May 19, 1887 – Apr 18, 1899	Appointed to begin next term as legislature had failed to elect. Elected in 1893 to finish term.	9	55th	10	Elected late in 1897.	May 14, 1897 – Dec 23, 1907	Democratic	Stephen Mallory II (Pensacola)	7
6	Samuel Pasco (Monticello)	Democratic	May 19, 1887 – Apr 18, 1899	Appointed to begin next term as legislature had failed to elect. Lost election to finish term.	10	56th	10	Elected late in 1897.	May 14, 1897 – Dec 23, 1907	Democratic	Stephen Mallory II (Pensacola)	7
Vacant			Apr 18, 1899 – Apr 20, 1899		10	56th	10	Elected late in 1897.	May 14, 1897 – Dec 23, 1907	Democratic	Stephen Mallory II (Pensacola)	7
7	James Taliaferro (Jacksonville)	Democratic	Apr 20, 1899 – Mar 3, 1911	Elected to finish term.	10	56th	10	Elected late in 1897.	May 14, 1897 – Dec 23, 1907	Democratic	Stephen Mallory II (Pensacola)	7
7	James Taliaferro (Jacksonville)	Democratic	Apr 20, 1899 – Mar 3, 1911	Elected to finish term.	10	57th	10	Elected late in 1897.	May 14, 1897 – Dec 23, 1907	Democratic	Stephen Mallory II (Pensacola)	7
7	James Taliaferro (Jacksonville)	Democratic	Apr 20, 1899 – Mar 3, 1911	Elected to finish term.	10	58th	11	Appointed to begin the term as legislature had failed to elect. Elected in 1903 to finish term. Died.	May 14, 1897 – Dec 23, 1907	Democratic	Stephen Mallory II (Pensacola)	7
7	James Taliaferro (Jacksonville)	Democratic	Apr 20, 1899 – Mar 3, 1911	Appointed to begin the term as legislature had failed to elect. Re-elected in 1905 to finish term. Lost re-election.	11	59th	11	Appointed to begin the term as legislature had failed to elect. Elected in 1903 to finish term. Died.	May 14, 1897 – Dec 23, 1907	Democratic	Stephen Mallory II (Pensacola)	7
7	James Taliaferro (Jacksonville)	Democratic	Apr 20, 1899 – Mar 3, 1911	Appointed to begin the term as legislature had failed to elect. Re-elected in 1905 to finish term. Lost re-election.	11	60th	11	Appointed to begin the term as legislature had failed to elect. Elected in 1903 to finish term. Died.	May 14, 1897 – Dec 23, 1907	Democratic	Stephen Mallory II (Pensacola)	7
7	James Taliaferro (Jacksonville)	Democratic	Apr 20, 1899 – Mar 3, 1911	Appointed to begin the term as legislature had failed to elect. Re-elected in 1905 to finish term. Lost re-election.	11	60th	11		Dec 23, 1907 – Dec 26, 1907	Vacant		
7	James Taliaferro (Jacksonville)	Democratic	Apr 20, 1899 – Mar 3, 1911	Appointed to begin the term as legislature had failed to elect. Re-elected in 1905 to finish term. Lost re-election.	11	60th	11	Appointed to finish term. Died.	Dec 26, 1907 – Mar 22, 1908	Democratic	William James Bryan (Jacksonville)	8
7	James Taliaferro (Jacksonville)	Democratic	Apr 20, 1899 – Mar 3, 1911	Appointed to begin the term as legislature had failed to elect. Re-elected in 1905 to finish term. Lost re-election.	11	60th	11		Mar 22, 1908 – Mar 27, 1908	Vacant		
7	James Taliaferro (Jacksonville)	Democratic	Apr 20, 1899 – Mar 3, 1911	Appointed to begin the term as legislature had failed to elect. Re-elected in 1905 to finish term. Lost re-election.	11	60th	11	Appointed to finish term. Retired.	Mar 27, 1908 – Mar 3, 1909	Democratic	William Hall Milton (Marianna)	9
7	James Taliaferro (Jacksonville)	Democratic	Apr 20, 1899 – Mar 3, 1911	Appointed to begin the term as legislature had failed to elect. Re-elected in 1905 to finish term. Lost re-election.	11	61st	12	Appointed to begin the term. Elected in 1909 to finish the term.	Mar 4, 1909 – Jun 17, 1936	Democratic	Duncan U. Fletcher (Jacksonville)	10
8	Nathan P. Bryan (Jacksonville)	Democratic	Mar 4, 1911 – Mar 3, 1917	Appointed to begin the term. Elected in 1911 to finish the term. Lost renomination.	12	62nd	12	Appointed to begin the term. Elected in 1909 to finish the term.	Mar 4, 1909 – Jun 17, 1936	Democratic	Duncan U. Fletcher (Jacksonville)	10
8	Nathan P. Bryan (Jacksonville)	Democratic	Mar 4, 1911 – Mar 3, 1917	Appointed to begin the term. Elected in 1911 to finish the term. Lost renomination.	12	63rd	12	Appointed to begin the term. Elected in 1909 to finish the term.	Mar 4, 1909 – Jun 17, 1936	Democratic	Duncan U. Fletcher (Jacksonville)	10
8	Nathan P. Bryan (Jacksonville)	Democratic	Mar 4, 1911 – Mar 3, 1917	Appointed to begin the term. Elected in 1911 to finish the term. Lost renomination.	12	64th	13	Re-elected in 1914.	Mar 4, 1909 – Jun 17, 1936	Democratic	Duncan U. Fletcher (Jacksonville)	10
9	Park Trammell (Lakeland)	Democratic	Mar 4, 1917 – May 8, 1936	Elected in 1916.	13	65th	13	Re-elected in 1914.	Mar 4, 1909 – Jun 17, 1936	Democratic	Duncan U. Fletcher (Jacksonville)	10
9	Park Trammell (Lakeland)	Democratic	Mar 4, 1917 – May 8, 1936	Elected in 1916.	13	66th	13	Re-elected in 1914.	Mar 4, 1909 – Jun 17, 1936	Democratic	Duncan U. Fletcher (Jacksonville)	10
9	Park Trammell (Lakeland)	Democratic	Mar 4, 1917 – May 8, 1936	Elected in 1916.	13	67th	14	Re-elected in 1920.	Mar 4, 1909 – Jun 17, 1936	Democratic	Duncan U. Fletcher (Jacksonville)	10
9	Park Trammell (Lakeland)	Democratic	Mar 4, 1917 – May 8, 1936	Re-elected in 1922.	14	68th	14	Re-elected in 1920.	Mar 4, 1909 – Jun 17, 1936	Democratic	Duncan U. Fletcher (Jacksonville)	10
9	Park Trammell (Lakeland)	Democratic	Mar 4, 1917 – May 8, 1936	Re-elected in 1922.	14	69th	14	Re-elected in 1920.	Mar 4, 1909 – Jun 17, 1936	Democratic	Duncan U. Fletcher (Jacksonville)	10
9	Park Trammell (Lakeland)	Democratic	Mar 4, 1917 – May 8, 1936	Re-elected in 1922.	14	70th	15	Re-elected in 1926.	Mar 4, 1909 – Jun 17, 1936	Democratic	Duncan U. Fletcher (Jacksonville)	10
9	Park Trammell (Lakeland)	Democratic	Mar 4, 1917 – May 8, 1936	Re-elected in 1928.	15	71st	15	Re-elected in 1926.	Mar 4, 1909 – Jun 17, 1936	Democratic	Duncan U. Fletcher (Jacksonville)	10
9	Park Trammell (Lakeland)	Democratic	Mar 4, 1917 – May 8, 1936	Re-elected in 1928.	15	72nd	15	Re-elected in 1926.	Mar 4, 1909 – Jun 17, 1936	Democratic	Duncan U. Fletcher (Jacksonville)	10
9	Park Trammell (Lakeland)	Democratic	Mar 4, 1917 – May 8, 1936	Re-elected in 1928.	15	73rd	16	Re-elected in 1932. Died.	Mar 4, 1909 – Jun 17, 1936	Democratic	Duncan U. Fletcher (Jacksonville)	10
9	Park Trammell (Lakeland)	Democratic	Mar 4, 1917 – May 8, 1936	Re-elected in 1934. Died.	16	74th	16	Re-elected in 1932. Died.	Mar 4, 1909 – Jun 17, 1936	Democratic	Duncan U. Fletcher (Jacksonville)	10
Vacant			May 8, 1936 – May 26, 1936		16	74th	16	Re-elected in 1932. Died.	Mar 4, 1909 – Jun 17, 1936	Democratic	Duncan U. Fletcher (Jacksonville)	10
10	Scott Loftin (Jacksonville)	Democratic	May 26, 1936 – Nov 3, 1936	Appointed to continue Trammell's term. Successor elected.	16	74th	16	Re-elected in 1932. Died.	Mar 4, 1909 – Jun 17, 1936	Democratic	Duncan U. Fletcher (Jacksonville)	10
10	Scott Loftin (Jacksonville)	Democratic	May 26, 1936 – Nov 3, 1936	Appointed to continue Trammell's term. Successor elected.	16	74th	16		Jun 17, 1936 – Jul 1, 1936	Vacant		
10	Scott Loftin (Jacksonville)	Democratic	May 26, 1936 – Nov 3, 1936	Appointed to continue Trammell's term. Successor elected.	16	74th	16	Appointed to continue Fletcher's term. Retired when successor qualified.	Jul 1, 1936 – Nov 3, 1936	Democratic	William Luther Hill (Gainesville)	11
11	Charles O. Andrews (Orlando)	Democratic	Nov 4, 1936 – Sep 18, 1946	Elected to finish Trammell's term.	16	74th	16	Elected to finish Fletcher's term.	Nov 4, 1936 – Jan 3, 1951	Democratic	Claude Pepper (Tallahassee)	12
11	Charles O. Andrews (Orlando)	Democratic	Nov 4, 1936 – Sep 18, 1946	Elected to finish Trammell's term.	16	75th	16	Elected to finish Fletcher's term.	Nov 4, 1936 – Jan 3, 1951	Democratic	Claude Pepper (Tallahassee)	12
11	Charles O. Andrews (Orlando)	Democratic	Nov 4, 1936 – Sep 18, 1946	Elected to finish Trammell's term.	16	76th	17	Re-elected in 1938.	Nov 4, 1936 – Jan 3, 1951	Democratic	Claude Pepper (Tallahassee)	12
11	Charles O. Andrews (Orlando)	Democratic	Nov 4, 1936 – Sep 18, 1946	Re-elected in 1940. Died.	17	77th	17	Re-elected in 1938.	Nov 4, 1936 – Jan 3, 1951	Democratic	Claude Pepper (Tallahassee)	12
11	Charles O. Andrews (Orlando)	Democratic	Nov 4, 1936 – Sep 18, 1946	Re-elected in 1940. Died.	17	78th	17	Re-elected in 1938.	Nov 4, 1936 – Jan 3, 1951	Democratic	Claude Pepper (Tallahassee)	12
11	Charles O. Andrews (Orlando)	Democratic	Nov 4, 1936 – Sep 18, 1946	Re-elected in 1940. Died.	17	79th	18	Re-elected in 1944. Lost renomination.	Nov 4, 1936 – Jan 3, 1951	Democratic	Claude Pepper (Tallahassee)	12
Vacant			Sep 18, 1946 – Sep 25, 1946		17	79th	18	Re-elected in 1944. Lost renomination.	Nov 4, 1936 – Jan 3, 1951	Democratic	Claude Pepper (Tallahassee)	12
12	Spessard Holland (Bartow)	Democratic	Sep 25, 1946 – Jan 3, 1971	Appointed to finish Andrews's term.	17	79th	18	Re-elected in 1944. Lost renomination.	Nov 4, 1936 – Jan 3, 1951	Democratic	Claude Pepper (Tallahassee)	12
12	Spessard Holland (Bartow)	Democratic	Sep 25, 1946 – Jan 3, 1971	Elected in 1946.	18	80th	18	Re-elected in 1944. Lost renomination.	Nov 4, 1936 – Jan 3, 1951	Democratic	Claude Pepper (Tallahassee)	12
12	Spessard Holland (Bartow)	Democratic	Sep 25, 1946 – Jan 3, 1971	Elected in 1946.	18	81st	18	Re-elected in 1944. Lost renomination.	Nov 4, 1936 – Jan 3, 1951	Democratic	Claude Pepper (Tallahassee)	12
12	Spessard Holland (Bartow)	Democratic	Sep 25, 1946 – Jan 3, 1971	Elected in 1946.	18	82nd	19	Elected in 1950.	Jan 3, 1951 – Jan 3, 1969	Democratic	George Smathers (Miami)	13
12	Spessard Holland (Bartow)	Democratic	Sep 25, 1946 – Jan 3, 1971	Re-elected in 1952.	19	83rd	19	Elected in 1950.	Jan 3, 1951 – Jan 3, 1969	Democratic	George Smathers (Miami)	13
12	Spessard Holland (Bartow)	Democratic	Sep 25, 1946 – Jan 3, 1971	Re-elected in 1952.	19	84th	19	Elected in 1950.	Jan 3, 1951 – Jan 3, 1969	Democratic	George Smathers (Miami)	13
12	Spessard Holland (Bartow)	Democratic	Sep 25, 1946 – Jan 3, 1971	Re-elected in 1952.	19	85th	20	Re-elected in 1956.	Jan 3, 1951 – Jan 3, 1969	Democratic	George Smathers (Miami)	13
12	Spessard Holland (Bartow)	Democratic	Sep 25, 1946 – Jan 3, 1971	Re-elected in 1958.	20	86th	20	Re-elected in 1956.	Jan 3, 1951 – Jan 3, 1969	Democratic	George Smathers (Miami)	13
12	Spessard Holland (Bartow)	Democratic	Sep 25, 1946 – Jan 3, 1971	Re-elected in 1958.	20	87th	20	Re-elected in 1956.	Jan 3, 1951 – Jan 3, 1969	Democratic	George Smathers (Miami)	13
12	Spessard Holland (Bartow)	Democratic	Sep 25, 1946 – Jan 3, 1971	Re-elected in 1958.	20	88th	21	Re-elected in 1962. Retired.	Jan 3, 1951 – Jan 3, 1969	Democratic	George Smathers (Miami)	13
12	Spessard Holland (Bartow)	Democratic	Sep 25, 1946 – Jan 3, 1971	Re-elected in 1964. Retired.	21	89th	21	Re-elected in 1962. Retired.	Jan 3, 1951 – Jan 3, 1969	Democratic	George Smathers (Miami)	13
12	Spessard Holland (Bartow)	Democratic	Sep 25, 1946 – Jan 3, 1971	Re-elected in 1964. Retired.	21	90th	21	Re-elected in 1962. Retired.	Jan 3, 1951 – Jan 3, 1969	Democratic	George Smathers (Miami)	13
12	Spessard Holland (Bartow)	Democratic	Sep 25, 1946 – Jan 3, 1971	Re-elected in 1964. Retired.	21	91st	22	Elected in 1968. Retired and resigned early.	Jan 3, 1969 – Dec 31, 1974	Republican	Edward Gurney (Winter Park)	14
13	Lawton Chiles (Lakeland)	Democratic	Jan 3, 1971 – Jan 3, 1989	Elected in 1970.	22	92nd	22	Elected in 1968. Retired and resigned early.	Jan 3, 1969 – Dec 31, 1974	Republican	Edward Gurney (Winter Park)	14
13	Lawton Chiles (Lakeland)	Democratic	Jan 3, 1971 – Jan 3, 1989	Elected in 1970.	22	93rd	22	Elected in 1968. Retired and resigned early.	Jan 3, 1969 – Dec 31, 1974	Republican	Edward Gurney (Winter Park)	14
13	Lawton Chiles (Lakeland)	Democratic	Jan 3, 1971 – Jan 3, 1989	Elected in 1970.	22	93rd	22	Appointed to finish Gurney's term, having been elected to the next term.	Jan 1, 1975 – Dec 31, 1980	Democratic	Richard Stone (Tallahassee)	15
13	Lawton Chiles (Lakeland)	Democratic	Jan 3, 1971 – Jan 3, 1989	Elected in 1970.	22	94th	23	Elected in 1974. Lost renomination and resigned early.	Jan 1, 1975 – Dec 31, 1980	Democratic	Richard Stone (Tallahassee)	15
13	Lawton Chiles (Lakeland)	Democratic	Jan 3, 1971 – Jan 3, 1989	Re-elected in 1976.	23	95th	23	Elected in 1974. Lost renomination and resigned early.	Jan 1, 1975 – Dec 31, 1980	Democratic	Richard Stone (Tallahassee)	15
13	Lawton Chiles (Lakeland)	Democratic	Jan 3, 1971 – Jan 3, 1989	Re-elected in 1976.	23	96th	23	Elected in 1974. Lost renomination and resigned early.	Jan 1, 1975 – Dec 31, 1980	Democratic	Richard Stone (Tallahassee)	15
13	Lawton Chiles (Lakeland)	Democratic	Jan 3, 1971 – Jan 3, 1989	Re-elected in 1976.	23	96th	23	Appointed to finish Stone's term, having been elected to the next term.	Jan 1, 1981 – Jan 3, 1987	Republican	Paula Hawkins (Winter Park)	16
13	Lawton Chiles (Lakeland)	Democratic	Jan 3, 1971 – Jan 3, 1989	Re-elected in 1976.	23	97th	24	Elected in 1980. Lost re-election.	Jan 1, 1981 – Jan 3, 1987	Republican	Paula Hawkins (Winter Park)	16
13	Lawton Chiles (Lakeland)	Democratic	Jan 3, 1971 – Jan 3, 1989	Re-elected in 1982. Retired.	24	98th	24	Elected in 1980. Lost re-election.	Jan 1, 1981 – Jan 3, 1987	Republican	Paula Hawkins (Winter Park)	16
13	Lawton Chiles (Lakeland)	Democratic	Jan 3, 1971 – Jan 3, 1989	Re-elected in 1982. Retired.	24	99th	24	Elected in 1980. Lost re-election.	Jan 1, 1981 – Jan 3, 1987	Republican	Paula Hawkins (Winter Park)	16
13	Lawton Chiles (Lakeland)	Democratic	Jan 3, 1971 – Jan 3, 1989	Re-elected in 1982. Retired.	24	100th	25	Elected in 1986.	Jan 3, 1987 – Jan 3, 2005	Democratic	Bob Graham (Miami Lakes)	17
14	Connie Mack III (Cape Coral)	Republican	Jan 3, 1989 – Jan 3, 2001	Elected in 1988.	25	101st	25	Elected in 1986.	Jan 3, 1987 – Jan 3, 2005	Democratic	Bob Graham (Miami Lakes)	17
14	Connie Mack III (Cape Coral)	Republican	Jan 3, 1989 – Jan 3, 2001	Elected in 1988.	25	102nd	25	Elected in 1986.	Jan 3, 1987 – Jan 3, 2005	Democratic	Bob Graham (Miami Lakes)	17
14	Connie Mack III (Cape Coral)	Republican	Jan 3, 1989 – Jan 3, 2001	Elected in 1988.	25	103rd	26	Re-elected in 1992.	Jan 3, 1987 – Jan 3, 2005	Democratic	Bob Graham (Miami Lakes)	17
14	Connie Mack III (Cape Coral)	Republican	Jan 3, 1989 – Jan 3, 2001	Re-elected in 1994. Retired.	26	104th	26	Re-elected in 1992.	Jan 3, 1987 – Jan 3, 2005	Democratic	Bob Graham (Miami Lakes)	17
14	Connie Mack III (Cape Coral)	Republican	Jan 3, 1989 – Jan 3, 2001	Re-elected in 1994. Retired.	26	105th	26	Re-elected in 1992.	Jan 3, 1987 – Jan 3, 2005	Democratic	Bob Graham (Miami Lakes)	17
14	Connie Mack III (Cape Coral)	Republican	Jan 3, 1989 – Jan 3, 2001	Re-elected in 1994. Retired.	26	106th	27	Re-elected in 1998. Retired.	Jan 3, 1987 – Jan 3, 2005	Democratic	Bob Graham (Miami Lakes)	17
15	Bill Nelson (Orlando)	Democratic	Jan 3, 2001 – Jan 3, 2019	Elected in 2000.	27	107th	27	Re-elected in 1998. Retired.	Jan 3, 1987 – Jan 3, 2005	Democratic	Bob Graham (Miami Lakes)	17
15	Bill Nelson (Orlando)	Democratic	Jan 3, 2001 – Jan 3, 2019	Elected in 2000.	27	108th	27	Re-elected in 1998. Retired.	Jan 3, 1987 – Jan 3, 2005	Democratic	Bob Graham (Miami Lakes)	17
15	Bill Nelson (Orlando)	Democratic	Jan 3, 2001 – Jan 3, 2019	Elected in 2000.	27	109th	28	Elected in 2004. Resigned.	Jan 3, 2005 – Sep 9, 2009	Republican	Mel Martínez (Orlando)	18
15	Bill Nelson (Orlando)	Democratic	Jan 3, 2001 – Jan 3, 2019	Re-elected in 2006.	28	110th	28	Elected in 2004. Resigned.	Jan 3, 2005 – Sep 9, 2009	Republican	Mel Martínez (Orlando)	18
15	Bill Nelson (Orlando)	Democratic	Jan 3, 2001 – Jan 3, 2019	Re-elected in 2006.	28	111th	28	Elected in 2004. Resigned.	Jan 3, 2005 – Sep 9, 2009	Republican	Mel Martínez (Orlando)	18
15	Bill Nelson (Orlando)	Democratic	Jan 3, 2001 – Jan 3, 2019	Re-elected in 2006.	28	111th	28	Appointed to finish Martínez's term. Retired.	Sep 9, 2009 – Jan 3, 2011	Republican	George LeMieux (Fort Lauderdale)	19
15	Bill Nelson (Orlando)	Democratic	Jan 3, 2001 – Jan 3, 2019	Re-elected in 2006.	28	112th	29	Elected in 2010.	Jan 3, 2011 – Jan 20, 2025	Republican	Marco Rubio (West Miami)	20
15	Bill Nelson (Orlando)	Democratic	Jan 3, 2001 – Jan 3, 2019	Re-elected in 2012. Lost re-election.	29	113th	29	Elected in 2010.	Jan 3, 2011 – Jan 20, 2025	Republican	Marco Rubio (West Miami)	20
15	Bill Nelson (Orlando)	Democratic	Jan 3, 2001 – Jan 3, 2019	Re-elected in 2012. Lost re-election.	29	114th	29	Elected in 2010.	Jan 3, 2011 – Jan 20, 2025	Republican	Marco Rubio (West Miami)	20
15	Bill Nelson (Orlando)	Democratic	Jan 3, 2001 – Jan 3, 2019	Re-elected in 2012. Lost re-election.	29	115th	30	Re-elected in 2016.	Jan 3, 2011 – Jan 20, 2025	Republican	Marco Rubio (West Miami)	20
Vacant			Jan 3, 2019 – Jan 8, 2019		30	116th	30	Re-elected in 2016.	Jan 3, 2011 – Jan 20, 2025	Republican	Marco Rubio (West Miami)	20
16	Rick Scott (Naples)	Republican	Jan 8, 2019 – present	Elected in 2018. Seated late to complete his term as Governor of Florida.	30	116th	30	Re-elected in 2016.	Jan 3, 2011 – Jan 20, 2025	Republican	Marco Rubio (West Miami)	20
16	Rick Scott (Naples)	Republican	Jan 8, 2019 – present	Elected in 2018. Seated late to complete his term as Governor of Florida.	30	117th	30	Re-elected in 2016.	Jan 3, 2011 – Jan 20, 2025	Republican	Marco Rubio (West Miami)	20
16	Rick Scott (Naples)	Republican	Jan 8, 2019 – present	Elected in 2018. Seated late to complete his term as Governor of Florida.	30	118th	31	Re-elected in 2022. Resigned to become U.S. Secretary of State.	Jan 3, 2011 – Jan 20, 2025	Republican	Marco Rubio (West Miami)	20
16	Rick Scott (Naples)	Republican	Jan 8, 2019 – present	Re-elected in 2024.	31	119th	31	Re-elected in 2022. Resigned to become U.S. Secretary of State.	Jan 3, 2011 – Jan 20, 2025	Republican	Marco Rubio (West Miami)	20
16	Rick Scott (Naples)	Republican	Jan 8, 2019 – present	Re-elected in 2024.	31	119th	31	Appointed to continue Rubio's term. Elected in 2026 to finish Rubio's term.	Jan 21, 2025 – present	Republican	Ashley Moody (Tampa)	21
16	Rick Scott (Naples)	Republican	Jan 8, 2019 – present	Re-elected in 2024.	31	120th	31	Appointed to continue Rubio's term. Elected in 2026 to finish Rubio's term.	Jan 21, 2025 – present	Republican	Ashley Moody (Tampa)	21
16	Rick Scott (Naples)	Republican	Jan 8, 2019 – present	Re-elected in 2024.	31	121st	32	To be determined in the 2028 election.				
To be determined in the 2030 election.					32	122nd	32	To be determined in the 2028 election.				

== See also ==
- Elections in Florida
- Florida's congressional delegations
- List of United States representatives from Florida
