= Floberg =

Floberg is a surname of Swedish origin. Notable people with the surname include:

- Bjørn Floberg (born 1947), Norwegian actor
- John F. Floberg (1915–2011), United States Assistant Secretary of the Navy
