= 1928 United States Senate election in Florida =

- November 6, 1928
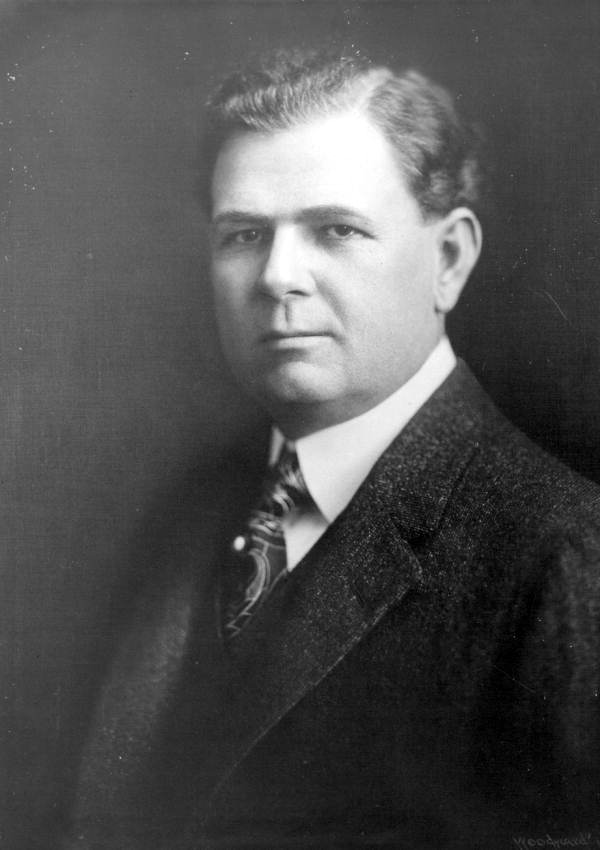

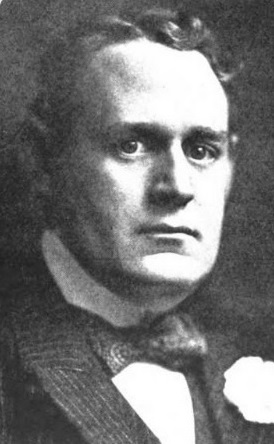
Nominee	Park Trammell	Barclay Warburton
Party	Democratic	Republican
Popular vote	153,816	70,633
Percentage	68.53%	31.47%
- County results Trammell: 50–60% 60–70% 70–80% 80–90% >90% Warburton: 50–60%
U.S. senator before election
Park Trammell
Democratic
Elected U.S. Senator
Park Trammell
Democratic

The 1928 United States Senate election in Florida was held on November 6, 1928.

Incumbent Democratic Senator Park Trammell defeated a primary challenge from Governor of Florida John W. Martin and was re-elected to a third term in office over Republican Barclay Warburton.

Republican Herbert Hoover won the state in the concurrent presidential election, and though Hoover's coattails did not make the race close, Warburton's percentage of the vote would not be exceeded by a Republican nominee for Senate until 1964. A Republican would not win a county in a U.S. Senate election in Florida again until 1950.

== Democratic primary ==
=== Candidates ===
- John W. Martin, Governor of Florida
- Park Trammell, incumbent Senator since 1917

=== Results ===
1928 Democratic U.S. Senate primary
Party	Candidate	Votes	%
Democratic	Park Trammell (incumbent)	138,534	57.97%
Democratic	John W. Martin	100,454	42.03%
Total votes		238,988	100.00%

== Republican primary ==
=== Candidates ===
- Barclay Warburton, businessman and Mayor of Palm Beach

=== Results ===
Warburton was unopposed for the Republican nomination.

== General election ==
=== Results ===
1928 U.S. Senate election in Florida
Party	Candidate	Votes	%	±%
Democratic	Park Trammell (incumbent)	153,816	68.53%	▼19.74
Republican	Barclay Warburton	70,633	31.47%	N/A
Total votes		224,449	100.00%	

== See also ==
- 1928 United States Senate elections
