= 1946 United States Senate election in Florida =

- November 5, 1946
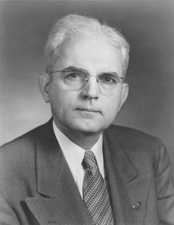

| Nominee | Spessard Holland | J. Harry Schad |
| Party | Democratic | Republican |
| Popular vote | 156,232 | 42,408 |
| Percentage | 78.65% | 21.35% |
- County results Holland: 50–60% 60–70% 70–80% 80–90% >90%
U.S. senator before election
Spessard Holland
Democratic
Elected U.S. Senator
Spessard Holland
Democratic

The 1946 United States Senate election in Florida was held on November 5, 1946.

Incumbent Florida Senator Charles O. Andrews did not run for re-election and died on September 18. Former Governor Spessard Holland, who served from 1941 to 1945, had already won the May Democratic primary (usually tantamount to victory in the solidly Democratic South), and was appointed to the vacant seat by Governor Millard Caldwell. Holland was then elected in the regular fall election.

== Democratic primary ==
=== Candidates ===
- Polly Rose Balfe, former member of the Democratic National Committee (DNC).
- Henry M. Burch
- Robert A. "Lex" Green, U.S. Representative from Starke
- Spessard L. Holland, incumbent Senator

=== Results ===
U.S. Senate candidate Spessard Holland looking at election returns with his family in May 1946 in Bartow, Florida.

1946 Democratic U.S. Senate primary
| Party | Candidate | Votes | % |
|---|---|---|---|
| Democratic | Spessard L. Holland (incumbent) | 204,352 | 60.72% |
| Democratic | Robert A. Green | 109,040 | 32.40% |
| Democratic | Polly Rose Balfe | 14,553 | 4.32% |
| Democratic | Henry M. Burch | 8,600 | 2.56% |
| Total votes | | 336,545 | 100.00% |

== Republican primary ==
=== Candidates ===
- J. Harry Schad

=== Results ===
Schad was unopposed for the Republican nomination.

== General election ==
=== Campaign ===
On September 18, outgoing Senator Andrews died. Governor Millard Caldwell appointed Holland as Andrews' replacement for the remainder of the term, ending January 3, 1947.

=== Results ===
General election results
| Party | Candidate | Votes | % | ±% |
|---|---|---|---|---|
| Democratic | Spessard Holland (incumbent) | 156,232 | 78.65% | ▼21.35 |
| Republican | J. Harry Schad | 42,408 | 21.35% | ▲21.35 |
| Total votes | | 198,640 | 100.00% | |

== See also ==
- 1946 United States Senate elections
