= 1952 United States Senate election in Florida =

- November 4, 1952
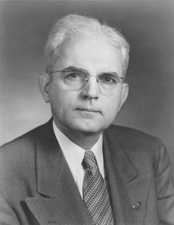
Nominee	Spessard Holland
Party	Democratic
Popular vote	616,665
Percentage	99.82%
- County Results; Holland: >90%
U.S. senator before election
Spessard Holland
Democratic
Elected U.S. Senator
Spessard Holland
Democratic

The 1952 United States Senate election in Florida was held on November 4, 1952. Incumbent Senator Spessard Holland was easily re-elected to a second term in office.

== Democratic primary ==
=== Candidates ===
- William A. Gaston, Jacksonville civil service employee
- Spessard L. Holland, incumbent Senator

=== Results ===
1952 Democratic U.S. Senate primary
Party	Candidate	Votes	%
Democratic	Spessard L. Holland (incumbent)	485,515	84.21%
Democratic	William A. Gaston	91,011	15.79%
Total votes		576,526	100.00%

== General election ==
=== Results ===
General election results
Party	Candidate	Votes	%	±%
Democratic	Spessard Holland (incumbent)	616,665	99.82%	
Write-in		1,135	0.18%	
Total votes		617,800	100.00%	

== See also ==
- 1952 United States Senate elections
