= 1958 United States Senate election in Florida =

- November 4, 1958
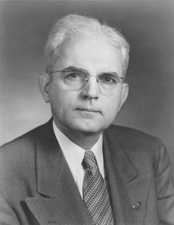

Nominee	Spessard Holland	Leland Hyzer
Party	Democratic	Republican
Popular vote	386,113	155,956
Percentage	71.23%	28.77%
- County results Holland: 50–60% 60–70% 70–80% 80–90% >90%
U.S. senator before election
Spessard Holland
Democratic
Elected U.S. Senator
Spessard Holland
Democratic

The 1958 United States Senate election in Florida was held on November 4, 1958.

After fending off a primary challenge from former senator Claude Pepper, the incumbent senator Spessard Holland was easily re-elected to a third term in office.

== Democratic primary ==
=== Candidates ===
- Spessard L. Holland, incumbent senator
- Claude Pepper, former senator

=== Campaign ===
The incumbent senator Holland, a firm conservative, was challenged by former senator Claude Pepper, who had been unseated in 1950. Holland had played a role in recruiting George A. Smathers to run against the liberal Pepper in that election. The two served as colleagues in the Senate from 1947 to 1951. 26.4% of the voting age population participated in the Democratic primary.

=== Results ===
Primary results by county: Holland: 50–60%; 60–70%; 70–80%; 80–90%; Pepper: 50–60%; 60–70%

1958 Democratic U.S. Senate primary
Party	Candidate	Votes	%
Democratic	Spessard L. Holland (incumbent)	408,084	55.94%
Democratic	Claude Pepper	321,377	44.06%
Total votes		729,461	100.00%

== Republican primary ==
=== Candidates ===
- Leland Hyzer, nominee for Florida's 4th congressional district in 1956

=== Results ===
Hyzer was unopposed for the Republican nomination.

== General election ==
=== Results ===
General election results
Party	Candidate	Votes	%	±%
Democratic	Spessard Holland (incumbent)	386,113	71.23%	▼28.59
Republican	Leland Hyzer	155,956	28.77%	▲28.77
Total votes		542,069	100.00%	

== See also ==
- 1958 United States Senate elections

== Works cited ==
- Steed, Robert; Moreland, Laurence; Baker, Tod, eds. (1980). Party Politics in the South. Praeger Publishers. ISBN 0030565863.
