= 1950 United States Senate election in Florida =

- November 7, 1950
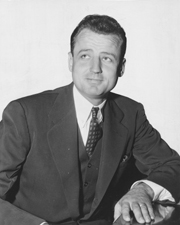

Nominee	George Smathers	John P. Booth
Party	Democratic	Republican
Popular vote	238,987	74,228
Percentage	76.30%	23.70%
- County results Smathers: 50–60% 60–70% 70–80% 80–90% >90% Booth: 50–60%
Senator before election
Claude Pepper
Democratic
Elected Senator
George Smathers
Democratic

The 1950 United States Senate election in Florida was held on November 7, 1950. Incumbent Senator Claude Pepper ran for a third full term in office but was defeated in the Democratic primary by U.S. Representative George Smathers, who went on to easily win the general election.

The primary campaign has been described as one of the "most bitter and ugly campaigns in Florida political history." Pepper was targeted for his opposition to incumbent President Harry Truman during the 1948 Democratic Party presidential primaries. Smathers also accused Pepper of ties to communist organizations and the Soviet Union, making this race emblematic of the second Red Scare in American politics.

The general election was low-key, as the Democratic primary was effectively tantamount to election. Smathers defeated Republican John P. Booth in a landslide. After the election, Pepper remained active in politics, mounting another unsuccessful Senate run in 1958 and then winning election to a U.S. House seat in 1962, a position he held until his death in 1989. Smathers served in the Senate until retiring in 1968. This was the first time since 1928, and the last time until 1964, that a Republican won a county in a U.S. Senate election in Florida.

== Background ==
Early in his Senate career, Claude Pepper was a close ally of President Franklin D. Roosevelt and was among the leading advocates for the passage of New Deal legislation. According to a personal account by Pepper, following his closer than expected re-election in 1944, efforts began to mobilize for his defeat in 1950. Wealthy businessman Edward Ball raised approximately $62,000 in a single afternoon for a war chest that would later be used to beat Pepper. After Roosevelt's death in 1945, Pepper provided only lukewarm support to his successor,Harry Truman. Pepper had been part of an unsuccessful 1948 campaign to "dump" Truman as the Democratic presidential nominee and suggested that the Democrats nominate Dwight D. Eisenhower, who had no political party affiliation at the time. Tensions began to grow between Truman and Pepper.

During the summer of 1949, then-U.S. House Representative George Smathers began to seriously contemplate running for the Senate seat. Truman called Smathers into a White House meeting and reportedly said to him, "I want you to do me a favor. I want you to beat that son-of-a-bitch Claude Pepper." In August, Pepper received a letter from Smathers' brother Frank, indicating that George would run against Pepper unless he was nominated for Solicitor General of the United States, if Smathers would be allowed to have a say in the nomination of a new senator if a vacancy resulted, and if Smathers were to receive the support of Pepper if he ran for governor in 1952. Pepper refused the deal and spoke with Truman during his visit to Miami, when Truman promised to assist Pepper in winning re-election.

== Democratic primary ==
Democratic Party primary election
- May 2, 1950
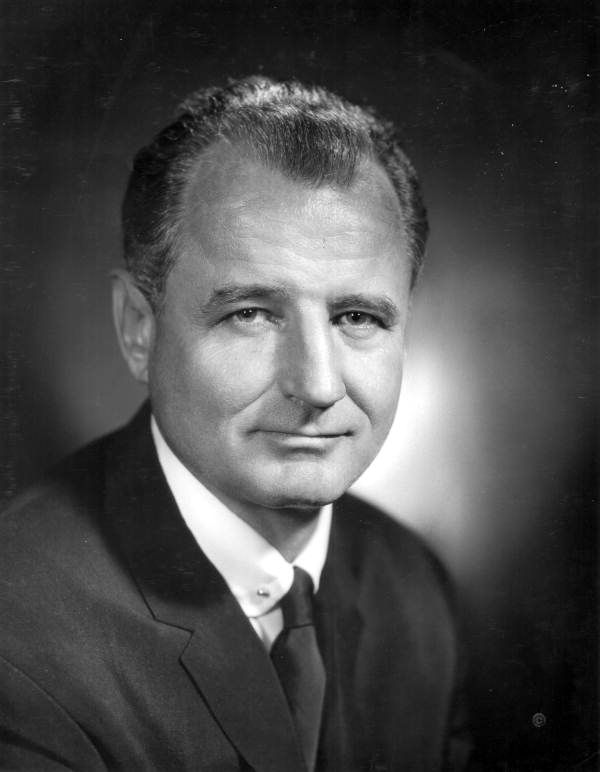

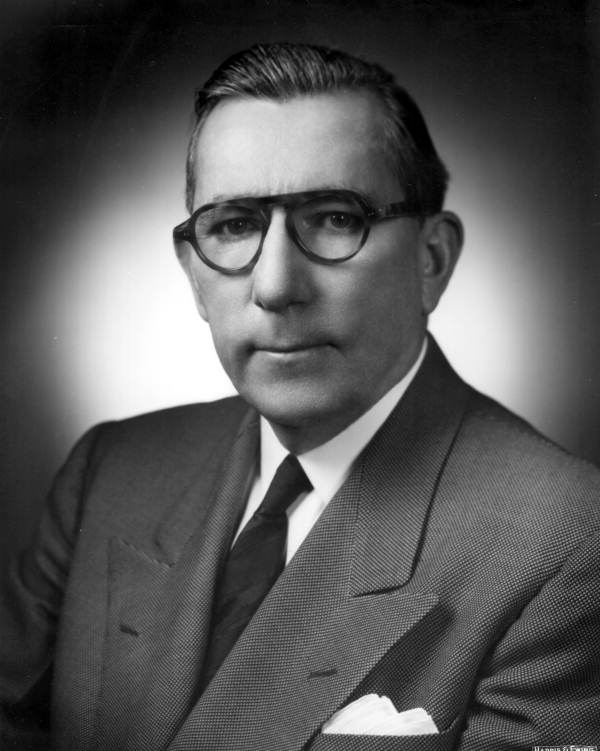
Nominee	George Smathers	Claude Pepper
Party	Democratic	Democratic
Popular vote	387,315	319,754
Percentage	54.78%	45.22%
- Results by county Smathers: 50–60% 60–70% 70–80% Pepper: 50–60% 60–70% 70–80%

=== Candidates ===
- Claude Pepper, incumbent U.S. Senator since 1936
- George Smathers, U.S. Representative from Miami

=== Campaign ===
The Democratic primary for the 1950 United States Senate election in Florida was described as the "most bitter and ugly campaign in Florida political history." Ormund Powers, a Central Florida historian, noted that ABC and NBC commentator David Brinkley said that "the Pepper-Smathers campaign would always stand out in his mind as the dirtiest in the history of American politics". On January 12, 1950, U.S. Representative George A. Smathers declared his candidacy for the race in Orlando at Kemp's Coliseum, where about 3,000 supporters had gathered. In his opening speech, Smathers accused Pepper of being "the leader of the radicals and extremists", an advocate of treason, and a person against the constitutional rights of Americans. Ed Ball, a power in state politics who had broken with Claude Pepper, financed his opponent, Smathers.

Prior to the entry of Smathers and Pepper, Orlando attorney James G. Horrell campaigned for the seat. Horrell researched Pepper's weaknesses and the state's voters. Horrell also compiled a list of communist-front groups that Pepper had communicated with. On the day that Pepper declared his candidacy, Horrell withdrew and endorsed Smathers. Horrell also sent his reports about Pepper to Smathers, which he used throughout the next few months. This would also prevent the chance of a run-off election. In late February and early March, the Jacksonville Journal conducted a poll in 11 counties important for the election. Smathers led by about 2-to-1 and dominated in Duval, Pinellas, and Volusia counties, while he was also statistically tied with Pepper in Dade, Escambia, and Hillsborough counties. However, Smathers did not trail in any of the 11 counties.

Smathers repeatedly attacked "Red Pepper" for having communist sympathies, condemning both his support for universal health care and his alleged support for the Soviet Union. Pepper had traveled to the Soviet Union in 1945 and, after meeting Soviet leader Joseph Stalin, declared he was "a man Americans could trust." Additionally, although Pepper supported universal health care, sometimes referred to as "socialized medicine", Smathers voted for "socialized medicine" in the Senate when it was introduced as Medicare in 1965. In The Saturday Evening Post, even respected writer and notorious anti-segregation editor Ralph McGill labeled Pepper a "spell-binding pinko". Beginning on March 28 and until the day of the primary, Smathers named one communist organization each day that Pepper addressed, starting with the American Slav Congress.

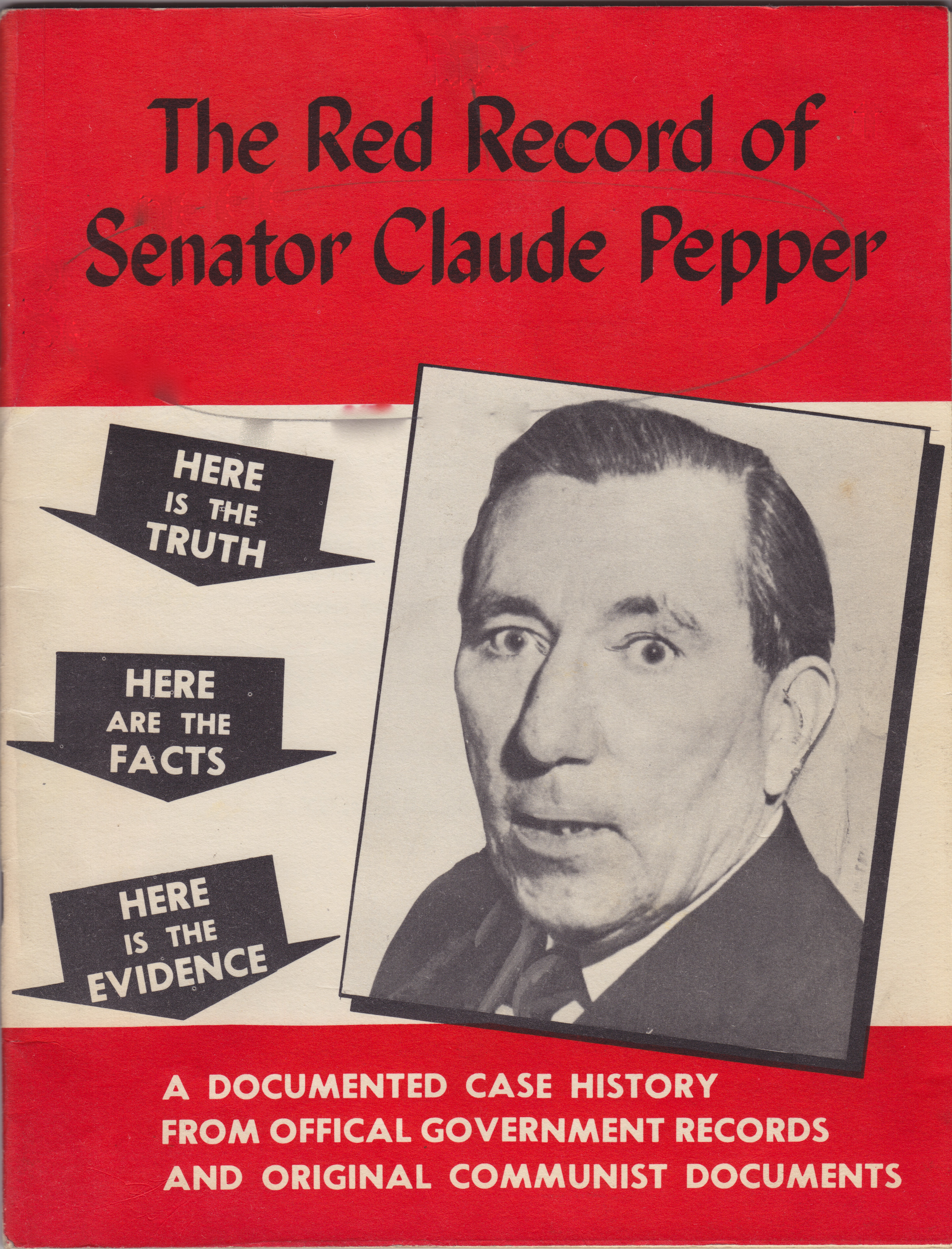
Front cover of The Red Record of Senator Claude Pepper

Pepper's opponents circulated widely a 49-page booklet titled The Red Record of Senator Claude Pepper. It contained photographs and headlines from several communist publications such as the Daily Worker. In April the Daily Worker endorsed Pepper, with Communist Party of Florida leader George Nelson warning that a Smathers victory would "strengthen the Dixiecrat-KKK forces in Florida as well as throughout the South." The booklet also made it seem as if Pepper desired to give Russia nuclear bomb-making instructions, billions of dollars, and the United States' natural resources. There was also a double page montage of Pepper in 1946 at New York City's Madison Square Garden with progressive Henry A. Wallace and civil rights activist Paul Robeson, and quoted Pepper speaking favorably of both of them. Throughout the campaign, Pepper denied sympathizing with communism.

Simultaneous to this election, then-U.S. House Representative Richard Nixon was running for the senate seat in California. In a letter from Senator Karl E. Mundt of South Dakota, he told Nixon that "It occurs to me that if Helen is your opponent in the fall, something of a similar nature might well be produced", in reference to The Red Record of Senator Claude Pepper and a similar Democratic primary between Manchester Boddy and Helen Gahagan Douglas.

Race also played a role in the election. Labor unions began a voter registration drive, which mostly added African Americans to the voter rolls. Smathers accused the "Northern labor bosses" of paying black people to register and vote for Pepper. Shortly after Smathers declared his candidacy, he indicated to the Florida Peace Officers Association that he would defend law enforcement officers for free if they were found guilty of civil rights violations. With the election occurring during the era of racial segregation, Pepper was portrayed as favoring integration and interracial marriage. He was also labeled a "nigger lover" and accused by Orlando Sentinel publisher Martin Andersen of shaking hands with a black woman in Sanford. In Dade County, which had a significant black and Jewish population, doctored photographs depicting Smathers in a Ku Klux Klan hood were distributed.

In the Groveland Case, four young African American men – Charles Greenlee, Walter Irvin, Samuel Shepherd, and Ernest Thomas – known as the Groveland Four, were accused of raping a 17-year old white women in Groveland on July 16, 1949. Thomas fled the area but was later shot and killed by police. Greenlee, Irvin, and Shepherd were convicted by an all-white jury. After the St. Petersburg Times questioned the verdict in April 1950, Lake County State Attorney J. W. Hunter, a supporter of Pepper, demanded that Pepper repudiate the news articles. However, Pepper refused. Hunter then denounced Pepper and endorsed Smathers. In addition to the racial violence, cross burning was also common at the time, with five in Jacksonville, ten in Orlando and Winter Park, and seventeen in the Tallahassee area.

With the accusation of "Northern labor bosses" sending "the carpetbaggers of 1950" to Florida on his behalf, Pepper reminded voters that Smathers was born in New Jersey and sometimes referred to him as a "damn Yankee intruder". In response, Smathers decorated speaking platform in the colors of his alma mater at the University of Florida, orange and blue, while informing his supporters that Pepper graduated from Harvard Law School.

Powers noted that throughout the campaign, "scarcely a day passed" without Andersen writing a news story, column, or editorial that was very positive of Smathers or highly critical of Pepper. Thirty-eight daily newspapers in Florida endorsed Smathers, while only the St. Petersburg Times and The Daytona Beach News-Journal endorsed Pepper. Among the newspapers that supported Smathers were the Miami Herald, owned by John S. Knight, and the Miami Daily News, published by James M. Cox, a former Governor of Ohio and the Democratic Party nominee for the 1920 presidential election. However, Pepper's aides compared this situation to when Alf Landon was endorsed by more editors and newspapers than Franklin Roosevelt in 1936, but received far fewer votes than him.

==== Redneck speech ====
Part of American political lore is the Smathers "redneck speech," which Smathers reportedly delivered to a poorly educated audience. The alleged comments were recorded in a small magazine, picked up in Time and elsewhere and etched into the public's memories. Time, during the campaign, claimed that Smathers said this:

Are you aware that Claude Pepper is known all over Washington as a shameless extrovert? Not only that, but this man is reliably reported to practice nepotism with his sister-in-law, he has a brother who is a known homo sapiens, and he has a sister who was once a thespian in wicked New York. Worst of all, it is an established fact that Mr. Pepper, before his marriage, habitually practiced celibacy.

The leading reporter who actually covered Smathers said he always gave the same speech. No Florida newspapers covering the campaign ever reported such remarks contemporaneously. Smathers offered $10,000 to anyone who could prove he said it, and there were no takers before his death on January 20, 2007.

=== Results ===
Smathers defeated incumbent Pepper in the primary election on May 2, 1950, by a margin of 9.56% – or a total of 67,561 votes. Smathers performed generally well across many areas of the state, with the exception of Miami, Tampa, and the Florida Panhandle. On the morning after the election, Andersen wrote on the front-page headline of the Orlando Sentinel, "Praise God From Whom All Blessings Flow ... We Have Won from Hell to Breakfast And From Dan to Beersheba ... And Staved Off Socialism", which was inspired by a headline in The New York Times celebrating Lawrence of Arabia's victory over the Turks in 1917.

Democratic primary results
Party	Candidate	Votes	%
Democratic	George Smathers	387,315	54.78
Democratic	Claude Pepper (incumbent)	319,754	45.22
Total votes		707,069	100

== Republican primary ==
On January 21, 1950, Coral Gables attorney John P. Booth entered the race after qualifying with Secretary of State of Florida Robert Andrew Gray. Booth received no primary opposition and thus became the Republican Party nominee by default.

== General election ==
Smathers defeated Booth in a landslide in the general election on November 7. Results indicated that Smathers received 76.3% of the vote compared to just 23.7% for Booth. In the popular vote, Smathers garnered 238,987 votes versus 74,228 for Booth. Smathers fared well throughout the state and won all but Pinellas County.

== Aftermath ==
Following the primary defeat, Pepper mounted a bid for United States Senate again in 1958, but lost to incumbent Spessard Holland in the Democratic primary by a margin of 11.89%. In 1962, Pepper successfully ran for Florida's 3rd congressional district in the United States House of Representatives. He remained a member of the House until his death on May 30, 1989.
