= Dan A. Kimball =

U.S. Secretary of the Navy from 1951 to 1953

Dan Kimball
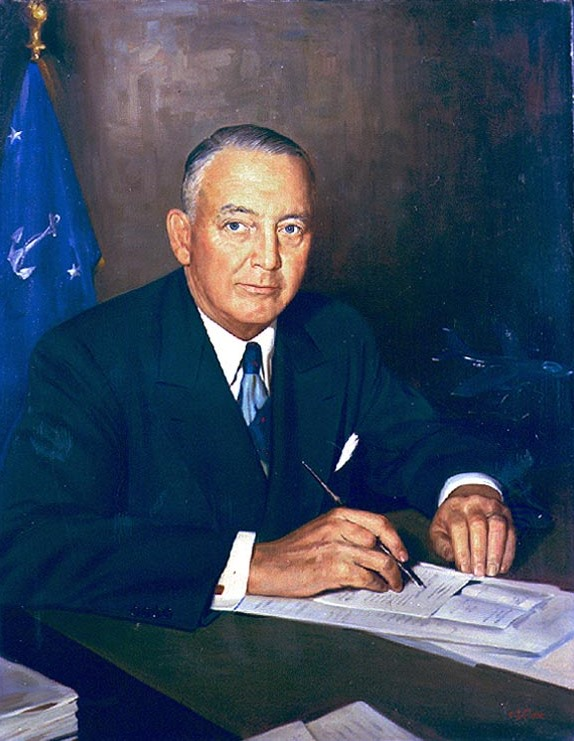
- Official portrait, c. 1951

51st United States Secretary of the Navy
- In office July 31, 1951 – January 20, 1953
- President: Harry S. Truman
- Preceded by: Francis P. Matthews
- Succeeded by: Robert B. Anderson

Under Secretary of the Navy
- In office May 1949 – July 31, 1951
- President: Harry S. Truman

Assistant Secretary of the Navy for Air
- In office February 1949 – May 1949
- President: Harry S. Truman

Personal details
- Born: Dan Able Kimball; March 1, 1896 St. Louis, Missouri, U.S.
- Died: July 30, 1970 (aged 74) Washington, D.C., U.S.
- Party: Democratic

Dan Able Kimball (March 1, 1896 – July 30, 1970) was the 51st U.S. Secretary of the Navy.

== Biography ==
Kimball was born in St. Louis, Missouri, on March 1, 1896. He was an Army Air Service pilot during the First World War and maintained an intense interest in aviation thereafter. Beginning in 1920, he was employed by the General Tire and Rubber Company, rising to Vice President of that firm in 1942. He subsequently was an executive of the rocket engine producer Aerojet Engineering Company, a division of General Tire. He was appointed Assistant Secretary of the Navy for Air in February 1949 and became Under Secretary of the Navy the following May.

Kimball assumed the post of Secretary of the Navy in July 1951 and held that position until the end of the Truman Administration in January 1953. His tenure was marked by the continuation of the Korean War, the resulting expansion of the nation's defense establishment and considerable technological progress in aviation, naval engineering and other defense-related fields. Returning to business after leaving office, he was President and later Chairman of the Board of the Aerojet General Corporation until 1969. He died on July 30, 1970.

Government offices
Preceded by John N. Brown	Assistant Secretary of the Navy (AIR); March 9, 1949 – May 24, 1949	Succeeded by John F. Floberg
Preceded by W. John Kenney	Under Secretary of the Navy; May 25, 1949 – July 31, 1951	Succeeded by Francis P. Whitehair
Preceded by Francis P. Matthews	United States Secretary of the Navy; July 31, 1951 – January 20, 1953	Succeeded by Robert B. Anderson
