= 1936 Florida gubernatorial election =

- November 3, 1936
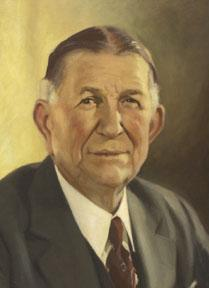

Nominee	Fred P. Cone	E.E. Callaway
Party	Democratic	Republican
Popular vote	253,638	59,832
Percentage	80.91%	19.09%
- Cone: 60–70% 70–80% 80–90% >90%
Governor before election
David Sholtz
Democratic
Elected Governor
Fred P. Cone
Democratic

The 1936 Florida gubernatorial election was held on Tuesday November 3, to elect the next Governor of Florida. Democratic candidate and president of the florida State Senate Fred P. Conel defeated Republican candidate E.E. Callaway with 80.91% of the vote.

== Primary elections ==
Primary elections were held on June 2, 1936.

=== Democratic primary ===
==== Candidates ====
- Fred P. Cone, former State Senator
- W. Raleigh Petteway, Judge of the Criminal Court of Record for Hillsborough County
- William C. Hodges, State Senator
- Jerry W. Carter, member of the Florida Railroad Commission.
- B. F. Paty, attorney
- Dan Chappell
- Grady Burton
- Peter Tomasello Jr., former Speaker of the State House and State Representative.
- Stafford Caldwell
- Amos Lewis
- Mallie Martin, commissioner of the Florida State Road Department.
- Carl Maples, lumber operator from Wakulla County.
- Redmond B. Gautier, former mayor of Miami.
- J. R. Yearwood

=== Endorsements ===
W. Raleigh Petteway

Notable individuals

- B.F. Paty, attorney, democratic candidate for Florida governor (1936)

Newspapers

- Columbia Gazette
- Sunday Sentinel-Star
Fred P. Cone

State legislators

- Lewis W. Zim, former state representative (1893–1895) & (1929–1933), former state senator (1905–1915)

Democratic Primary Runoff by county Cone: 50–60%; 60–70%; 70–80%; 80–90%; >90%; Petteway: 50–60%; 60–70%; 70–80%

==== Results ====
Democratic primary results
Party	Candidate	Votes	%
Democratic	W. Raleigh Petteway	51,705	15.73
Democratic	Fred P. Cone	46,842	14.25
Democratic	William C. Hodges	46,471	14.14
Democratic	Jerry W. Carter	35,578	10.82
Democratic	B. F. Paty	34,153	10.39
Democratic	Dan Chappell	29,494	8.97
Democratic	Grady Burton	24,985	7.60
Democratic	Peter Tomasello Jr.	22,355	6.80
Democratic	Stafford Caldwell	19,789	6.02
Democratic	Amos Lewis	8,068	2.45
Democratic	Mallie Martin	4,264	1.30
Democratic	Carl Maples	2,389	0.73
Democratic	Redmond B. Gautier	1,607	0.49
Democratic	J. R. Yearwood	1,049	0.32
Total votes		328,749	100.00

Democratic primary runoff results
Party	Candidate	Votes	%
Democratic	Fred P. Cone	184,540	58.83
Democratic	W. Raleigh Petteway	129,150	41.17
Total votes		313,690	100.00

==== Runoff Results by county ====
County	Fred P. Cone		W. Raleigh Petteway		Total votes
County	#	%	#	%	Total votes
Alachua	3,279	62.21%	1,992	37.79%	5,271
Baker	1,891	90.83%	191	9.17%	2,082
Bay	2,438	55.45%	1,959	44.55%	4,397
Bradford	1,588	79.52%	409	20.48%	1,997
Brevard	1,667	56.59%	1,279	43.41%	2,946
Broward	1,942	45.75%	2,303	54.25%	4,245
Calhoun	2,054	71.05%	837	28.95%	2,891
Charlotte	770	58.11%	555	41.89%	1,325
Citrus	1,347	75.93%	427	24.07%	1,774
Clay	1,291	68.49%	594	31.51%	1,885
Collier	876	87.43%	126	12.57%	1,002
Columbia	2,636	74.04%	924	25.96%	3,560
Dade	10,560	36.07%	18,717	63.93%	29,277
DeSoto	1,540	56.56%	1,183	43.44%	2,723
Dixie	1,179	71.24%	476	28.76%	1,655
Duval	20,444	74.86%	6,865	25.14%	27,309
Escambia	8,109	69.45%	3,567	30.55%	11,676
Flagler	517	72.01%	201	27.99%	718
Franklin	1,119	65.75%	583	34.25%	1,702
Gadsden	1,980	69.47%	870	30.53%	2,850
Gilchrist	764	81.10%	178	18.90%	942
Glades	681	68.44%	314	31.56%	995
Gulf	668	62.14%	407	37.86%	1,075
Hamilton	1,314	70.08%	561	29.92%	1,875
Hardee	1,887	53.27%	1,655	46.73%	3,542
Hendry	561	53.63%	485	46.37%	1,046
Hernando	822	56.30%	638	43.70%	1,460
Highlands	1,927	65.28%	1,025	34.72%	2,952
Hillsborough	13,860	55.20%	11,249	44.80%	25,109
Holmes	4,139	71.45%	1,654	28.55%	5,793
Indian River	1,172	61.20%	743	38.80%	1,915
Jackson	5,499	73.29%	2,004	26.71%	7,503
Jefferson	1,056	73.64%	378	26.36%	1,434
Lafayette	952	70.05%	407	29.95%	1,359
Lake	2,554	47.59%	2,813	52.41%	5,367
Lee	'2,536	62.49%	1,522	37.51%	4,058
Leon	2,180	53.77%	1,874	46.23%	4,054
Levy	1,846	73.58%	663	26.42%	2,509
Liberty	932	78.58%	254	21.42%	1,186
Madison	2,118	71.97%	825	28.03%	2,943
Manatee	2,800	54.95%	2,296	45.05%	5,096
Marion	3,823	79.20%	1,004	20.80%	4,827
Martin	562	56.71%	429	43.29%	991
Monroe	582	26.24%	1,636	73.76%	2,218
Nassau	902	59.30%	619	40.70%	1,521
Okaloosa	1,834	53.21%	1,613	46.79%	3,447
Okeechobee	530	55.79%	420	44.21%	950
Orange	4,337	47.40%	4,813	52.60%	9,150
Osceola	1,422	56.14%	1,111	43.86%	2,533
Palm Beach	4,973	41.88%	6,902	58.12%	11,875
Pasco	2,009	55.81%	1,591	44.19%	3,600
Pinellas	5,021	45.24%	6,078	54.76%	11,099
Polk	6,499	49.11%	6,734	50.89%	13,233
Putnam	2,800	74.25%	971	25.75%	3,771
Santa Rosa	2,291	57.72%	1,678	42.28%	3,969
Sarasota	1,635	53.91%	1,398	46.09%	3,033
Seminole	1,710	48.39%	1,824	51.61%	3,534
St. Johns	3,325	69.93%	1430	30.07%	4,755
St. Lucie	1,317	55.81%	1043	44.19%	2,360
Sumter	2,032	69.95%	873	30.05%	2,905
Suwannee	2,743	68.94%	1,236	31.06%	3,979
Taylor	1,591	61.07%	1,014	38.93%	2,605
Union	1,000	76.16%	313	23.84%	1,313
Volusia	7,307	60.94%	4,683	39.06%	11,990
Wakulla	1,112	62.72%	661	37.28%	1,773
Walton	2,671	57.43%	1,980	42.57%	4,651
Washington	3,017	73.41%	1,093	26.59%	4,110

== General election ==
=== Candidates ===
- Fred P. Cone, Democratic
- Elvy Edison "E.E" Callaway, Republican, white lawyer for the NAACP.

=== Results ===
1936 Florida gubernatorial election
Party	Candidate	Votes	%	±%
Democratic	Fred P. Cone	253,638	80.91%	−14.29%
Republican	E.E. Callaway	59,832	19.09%	−14.29%
Majority		193,806		
Turnout				
Democratic hold		Swing		

==== County results ====
County	Fred P. Cone Democratic		E.E. Callaway Republican		Total votes
County	#	%	#	%	Total votes
Alachua	4,908	87.96%	672	12.04%	5,580
Baker	1,576	96.33%	60	3.67%	1,636
Bay	3,024	87.65%	426	12.35%	3,450
Bradford	1,521	87.62%	215	12.38%	1,736
Brevard	2,526	73.45%	913	26.55%	3,439
Broward	4,608	73.94%	1,624	26.06%	6,232
Calhoun	1,087	89.69%	125	10.31%	1,212
Charlotte	889	69.24%	395	30.76%	1,284
Citrus	1,410	94.31%	85	5.69%	1,495
Clay	1,359	77.35%	398	22.65%	1,757
Collier	923	94.76%	51	5.24%	974
Columbia	2,838	95.23%	142	4.77%	2,980
Dade	27,500	74.56%	9,383	25.44%	36,883
DeSoto	1,643	78.69%	445	21.31%	2,088
Dixie	1,139	96.20%	45	3.80%	1,184
Duval	23,312	84.73%	4,201	15.27%	27,513
Escambia	9,049	91.29%	863	8.71%	9,912
Flagler	546	88.93%	68	11.07%	614
Franklin	1,391	94.56%	80	5.44%	1,471
Gadsden	2,694	97.82%	60	2.18%	2,754
Gilchrist	802	94.91%	43	5.09%	845
Glades	584	81.56%	132	18.44%	716
Gulf	845	95.59%	39	4.41%	884
Hamilton	1,498	94.69%	84	5.31%	1,582
Hardee	2,198	74.26%	762	25.74%	2,960
Hendry	708	80.09%	176	19.91%	884
Hernando	1,169	87.17%	172	12.83%	1,341
Highlands	2,162	79.37%	562	20.63%	2,724
Hillsborough	21,196	84.81%	3,795	15.19%	24,991
Holmes	3,271	88.77%	414	11.23%	3,685
Indian River	1,365	80.06%	340	19.94%	1,705
Jackson	3,961	95.22%	199	4.78%	4,160
Jefferson	1,287	96.33%	49	3.67%	1,336
Lafayette	1,113	96.61%	39	3.39%	1,152
Lake	4,517	76.48%	1,389	23.52%	5,906
Lee	2,764	78.75%	746	21.25%	3,510
Leon	3,795	95.66%	172	4.34%	3,967
Levy	2,014	94.91%	108	5.09%	2,122
Liberty	837	98.12%	16	1.88%	853
Madison	2,305	96.69%	79	3.31%	2,384
Manatee	3,688	77.01%	1,101	22.99%	4,789
Marion	4,637	88.93%	577	11.07%	5,214
Martin	906	80.39%	221	19.61%	1,127
Monroe	2,301	90.73%	235	9.27%	2,536
Nassau	1,180	90.28%	127	9.72%	1,307
Okaloosa	2,217	90.01%	246	9.99%	2,463
Okeechobee	699	84.32%	130	15.68%	829
Orange	8,148	71.79%	3,202	28.21%	11,350
Osceola	1,743	65.90%	902	34.10%	2,645
Palm Beach	10,056	73.20%	3,682	26.80%	13,738
Pasco	2,518	75.30%	826	24.70%	3,344
Pinellas	12,198	62.10%	7,444	37.90%	19,642
Polk	10,765	74.95%	3,598	25.05%	14,363
Putnam	3,078	86.32%	488	13.68%	3,566
Santa Rosa	2,835	86.99%	424	13.01%	3,259
Sarasota	2,396	74.18%	834	25.82%	3,230
Seminole	2,702	80.11%	671	19.89%	3,373
St. Johns	3,432	78.97%	914	21.03%	4,346
St. Lucie	2,062	86.57%	320	13.43%	2,382
Sumter	2,143	93.62%	146	6.38%	2,289
Suwannee	2,892	96.30%	111	3.70%	3,003
Taylor	1,814	94.92%	97	5.08%	1,911
Union	1,074	94.54%	62	5.46%	1,136
Volusia	8,959	72.52%	3,395	27.48%	12,354
Wakulla	1,406	98.87%	16	1.13%	1,422
Walton	2,848	92.11%	244	7.89%	3,092
Washington	2,607	91.19%	252	8.81%	2,859
Total	253,638	80.91%	59,832	19.09%	313,470
