= Fred P. Cone =

American politician (1871–1948)

Fred Preston Cone
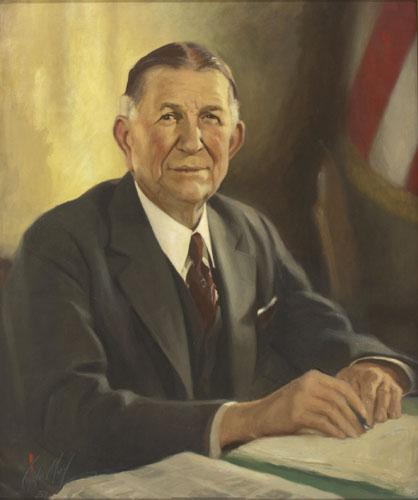

27th Governor of Florida
- In office January 5, 1937 – January 7, 1941
- Preceded by: David Sholtz
- Succeeded by: Spessard Holland

President of the Florida Senate
- In office 1911
- Preceded by: Frederick M. Hudson
- Succeeded by: Herbert J. Drane

Member of the Florida Senate
- In office 1907–1913

Mayor of Lake City, Florida

Personal details
- Born: September 28, 1871 Benton, Columbia County, Florida, U.S.
- Died: July 28, 1948 (aged 76) Lake City, Florida, U.S.
- Party: Democratic
- Spouse(s): Ruby Scarborough (died 1923); Mildred Victoria Thompson
- Children: Jessie Cone Brimmer (1902–1984)
- Profession: Lawyer, banker, politician

Frederick Preston Cone (September 28, 1871 – July 28, 1948) was an American New Deal Democratic politician who served as the 27th Governor of Florida.

== Early life ==
Frederick Preston Cone was born in the Benton community of northern Columbia County, Florida to William Henry Cone and Sarah Emily Branch on September 28, 1871. His father was a state senator prior to the American Civil War. He received his education at the Florida Agricultural College (precursor of the University of Florida) and Jasper Normal College. Although he never received a law degree, in 1892 he passed the Florida bar exam and began a successful law practice in Lake City, Florida. In 1911 Cone and eight other prominent Lake Citians decided to open a bank. With $50,000 in capital, the Columbia County Bank opened in February 1912 and grew with the community. Cone retained his leadership role on the board of directors until shortly before his death. The bank celebrated its centennial in 2012.

=== Personal ===
Cone married his first wife, Ruby Scarborough, and the union bore one child in 1902, a daughter named Jessie. Ruby died in 1923. He wed again in 1930 to Mildred Victoria Thompson. He held membership in Benevolent and Protective Order of Elks, Freemasonry, Ancient Arabic Order of the Nobles of the Mystic Shrine and Rotary International.

== Politics ==
Cone began his political career as Mayor of Lake City, and served three terms there. He was elected to and served in the Florida Senate from 1907 to 1913, serving as the senate president in 1911. Cone was active in national politics, attending the 1924 and 1928 Democratic National Conventions as a delegate before chairing the Florida delegation in 1932.

=== Governor ===
Cone was elected as Florida governor in November 1936 and was inaugurated on January 5, 1937. He had just turned 65, and he had problems with his health. Subsequent Governor Spessard Holland thought he was too old for the job. It was the height of the Great Depression in the United States, and Florida was suffering like every other state.

During Cone's tenure, Florida A&M University President J. R. E. Lee was able to secure higher salaries for teachers and administrators at the university despite the statement by Gov. Cone, a Democrat and a strict segregationist, that "no Negro was worth $4000 a year."

At that time, Florida governors held little real power; they were primarily figureheads for the state. The 1885 state constitution severely limited the governor's power – a reaction to the bitter memories of the reconstruction era following the Civil War. The governor was just one of seven elected cabinet members; only the governor was limited to a single 4-year term. Political scientist V. O. Key, Jr. described politics in Florida as "every man for himself".

Many state boards, commissions and departments answered to a specific cabinet member or to the legislature directly. The cabinet as a whole also decided many issues. The governor's power was vested in three tools:

- Patronage: Under the spoils system, the governor spent more than half his time appointing commissioners, officers, directors and bureaucrats throughout government, which provided leverage with other elected officials.
- Veto: The use and threat of legislative veto was used to influence the contents of many bills, or to gain favors, which would be called in for important matters.
- Persuasion: Citizens and the press listened to the governor, who helped shape public opinion and citizens were encouraged to contact other elected officials and convey their opinions.

Cone was a fiscal conservative and a "hands-off" governor. He generally believed that the governor should not interfere in operation of state agencies or deliberations of the legislature. However, Cone did not hesitate to reject legislation he disliked, using the veto more than any prior governor. The state badly needed new revenue streams, but business opposed a sales tax and a 1924 amendment to the state constitution prohibited a state income tax. Property taxes were the primary revenue of cities and counties, and the gas tax funded most of the state's activities. As a result, little was accomplished.

=== Accomplishments ===
During his term, the Florida Highway Patrol was created, and although Cone opposed new taxes, he funded the agency by fees assessed on driver's licenses. To encourage tourism, the state sponsored a 110,000-square-foot exhibition at the 1939 New York World's Fair, the largest of any state. Florida's presentation recreated a tropical paradise and included 45 exhibits depicting natural resources, points of interest and the latest discoveries in science and industry.

=== Decision ===
In 1940 Cone made an unsuccessful bid for the U.S. Senate seat previously held by Park Trammell, who had died in office several years earlier. Cone was defeated in the Democratic primary by incumbent Charles O. Andrews, who easily won the general election.

== Death ==
After leaving the governor's office on January 7, 1941, Cone returned to Lake City. He died there in 1948 and was buried at the Prospect Primitive Baptist Cemetery near White Springs, Florida in Hamilton County.

== See also ==
- Politics of the United States

Party political offices
Preceded by David Sholtz	Democratic nominee for Governor of Florida; 1936	Succeeded by Spessard Holland
Political offices
Preceded by David Sholtz	Governor of Florida; January 5, 1937 – January 7, 1941	Succeeded by Spessard Holland
