= 1940 United States Senate election in Florida =

1936 U.S. Senate Democratic primary in Florida
- May 28, 1940
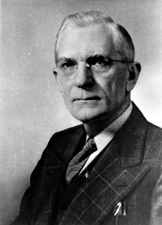

Nominee	Charles O. Andrews	Jerry W. Carter
Party	Democratic	Democratic
Popular vote	312,293	137,641
Percentage	69.4%	30.6%
- Andrews: 50–60% 60–70% 70–80% 80–90% Carter: 50–60% 60–70%
U.S. senator before election
Charles O. Andrews
Democratic
Elected U.S. Senator
Charles O. Andrews
Democratic

The 1940 United States Senate election in Florida was held on November 5, 1940.

Incumbent Senator Charles O. Andrews failed to achieve a majority in the May 7 primary election, but defeated Jerry W. Carter easily in a run-off on May 28. Andrews won the November general election without an opponent.

== Background ==
Incumbent Senator Charles O. Andrews was first elected in a special 1936 election to complete the unexpired term of Park Trammell.

== Democratic primary ==
=== Candidates ===
- Charles O. Andrews, incumbent Senator
- Jerry W. Carter, member of the Florida Railway Commission and candidate for Governor in 1936
- Charles Francis Coe, resident of West Palm Beach
- Fred P. Cone, Governor of Florida
- O.B. Hazen, resident of Pahokee
- Bernarr Macfadden, retired bodybuilder and proponent of physical culture

=== Results ===
Results by county: Andrews: <30%; 30–40%; 40–50%; 50–60%; 60–70%; Carter: <30%; 30–40%; Macfadden: <30%; 30–40%; Cone: <30%; 30–40%; 40–50%; 50–60%

1940 Democratic U.S. Senate primary
Party	Candidate	Votes	%
Democratic	Charles O. Andrews (incumbent)	179,195	40.92%
Democratic	Jerry W. Carter	80,869	18.47%
Democratic	Bernarr Macfadden	14,553	16.32%
Democratic	Fred P. Cone	68,584	15.66%
Democratic	Charles Francis Coe	33,463	7.64%
Democratic	O. B. Hazen	4,370	1.00%
Total votes		437,968	100.00%

=== Runoff ===
1940 Democratic U.S. Senate runoff
Party	Candidate	Votes	%
Democratic	Charles O. Andrews (incumbent)	312,293	69.41%
Democratic	Jerry W. Carter	137,641	30.59%
Total votes		449,934	100.00%

== General election ==
=== Results ===
County results Andrews: 90–100%

General election results
Party	Candidate	Votes	%	±%
Democratic	Charles O. Andrews (incumbent)	323,216	100.00%	▲19.10
Total votes		323,216	100.00%	

== See also ==
- 1940 United States Senate elections
