= Spessard Holland =

American lawyer and politician (1892–1971)

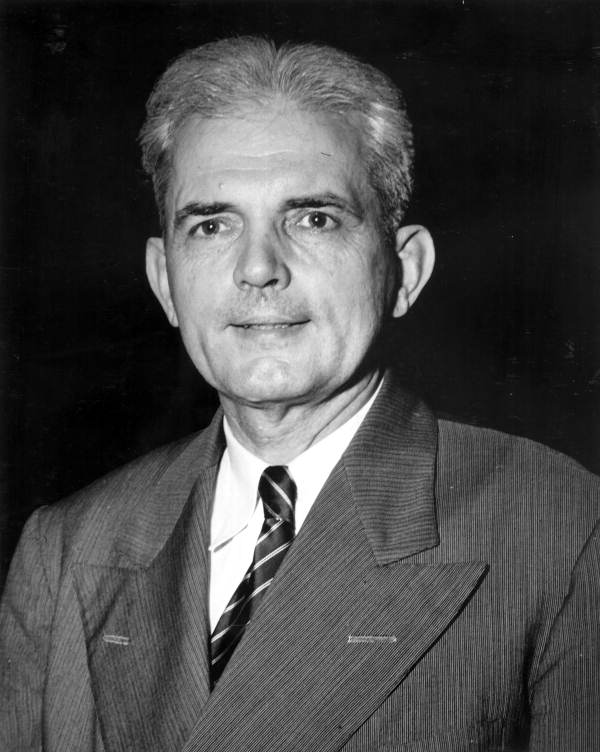
- Holland in 1946

United States Senator from Florida
- In office September 25, 1946 – January 3, 1971
- Preceded by: Charles O. Andrews
- Succeeded by: Lawton Chiles

28th Governor of Florida
- In office January 7, 1941 – January 2, 1945
- Preceded by: Fred P. Cone
- Succeeded by: Millard Caldwell

Member of the Florida Senate from the 7th district
- In office 1932–1940
- Preceded by: John J. Swearingen
- Succeeded by: Harry E. King

Judge of the Polk County Court
- In office 1921–1929

Prosecutor of Polk County, Florida
- In office 1919–1921

Personal details
- Born: Spessard Lindsey Holland; July 10, 1892 Bartow, Florida, U.S.
- Died: November 6, 1971 (aged 79) Bartow, Florida, U.S.
- Resting place: Wildwood Cemetery; Bartow, Florida
- Party: Democratic
- Spouse: Mary Agnes Groover Holland
- Children: 4
- Education: Emory College (BA); University of Florida (JD)

Military service
- Allegiance: United States
- Branch/service: United States Army; United States Army Signal Corps Aviation Section
- Years of service: 1917–1919
- Rank: Captain
- Unit: Coast Artillery Corps; 24th Flying Squadron
- Battles/wars: World War I
- Awards: Distinguished Service Cross

Spessard Lindsey Holland (July 10, 1892 – November 6, 1971) was an American lawyer and politician. A Southern Democrat, he served as the 28th governor of Florida from 1941 to 1945, and as a U.S. senator for Florida from 1946 to 1971. He was the first person born in Florida to serve as governor and U.S. senator for the state. While serving as a U.S. senator he would notably introduce the 24th Amendment.

During his tenure as governor, he was mainly preoccupied with preparations for World War II and the war itself. On the death of U.S. senator Charles O. Andrews, Holland was appointed by Governor Millard F. Caldwell on September 25, 1946, to serve out the rest of Andrews' term, which was to expire the following January. He was elected to a full term in November 1946 and was re-elected senator in 1952, 1958 and 1964, retiring in January 1971.

== Early life and education ==
Spessard Holland was one of three children of Benjamin Franklin Holland and the former Fannie Virginia Spessard. Benjamin Holland was a Confederate veteran of the American Civil War, serving as a member of the Georgia State Line under Company I of the 2nd Regiment. Benjamin's father was the orderly sergeant for his son's unit. Benjamin was born in Carroll County, Georgia, in 1846 and was 17 when he joined the Georgia State Line in January 1864. He participated in the Battle of Kennesaw Mountain, where he was wounded. In 1882 he moved to Bartow, Florida, where he created the first abstract company in Polk County; he eventually served as a member of the school board, as a county commissioner, and as the county treasurer.

Virginia Spessard, who was known by her middle name, moved to Bartow in 1889 and was a teacher at the Summerlin Institute (now Bartow High School) prior to her marriage. Benjamin and Virginia married in September 1890 in Monroe County, West Virginia.

Their son Spessard was born at his family's home at 390 East Church Street in Bartow, on July 10, 1892. He attended public schools, graduating from the Summerlin Institute in 1909. Holland graduated magna cum laude from Emory College (now Emory University) in Atlanta in 1912. Holland went on to teach high school in Warrenton, Georgia, from 1912 to 1914.

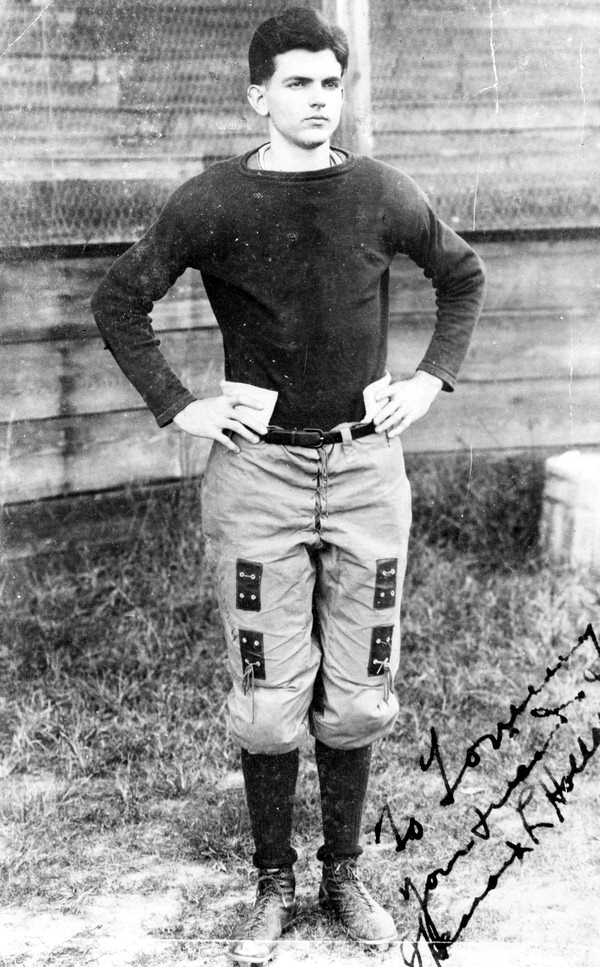
Holland as a football player at Emory.

In 1916, Holland began attending law school at the University of Florida. There he taught in the "sub-freshman department" (high school) of the university. He also became the first elected student body president and a member of the debating society. During his time at Emory and UF, he participated in track and field, football, basketball, and baseball. On one occasion, he played so well as a pitcher in an exhibition game against the Philadelphia Athletics that Connie Mack (the grandfather of Connie Mack III, who later held the Senate seat Holland once occupied) offered him a contract that Holland ultimately declined.

== World War I service ==
Holland qualified for a Rhodes Scholarship, and was already a junior partner with R.B. Huffaker in the Huffaker & Holland law firm, but his plans were interrupted by World War I. He volunteered for service and was commissioned as a second lieutenant in the Coast Artillery Corps, where he was transferred to France and served in the brigade's JAG Corps as an assistant adjutant. At his request, Holland was later transferred to the 24th Aero Squadron, Signal Corps of the Army Air Corps. Here he served with Lieutenant George E. Goldthwaite as a gunner and aerial observer, gathering information and taking photographs in reconnaissance missions behind enemy lines. At various times Holland took part in battles at Meuse-Argonne, Champagne, St. Mihiel, and Lunéville, where he downed two enemy planes; on one mission, Holland's plane crash-landed in a crater. On December 11, 1918, Holland and Goldthwaite were each awarded the Distinguished Service Cross. Holland's citation, signed by General John J. Pershing, noted:

First Lieutenant Spessard L. Holland, C.A.C. Observer 24th, Aero Squadron, distinguished himself by extra-ordinary heroism in connection with military operations against an armed enemy of the United States at Bois de Banthville, France, on October 15, 1918 and in recognition of his gallant conduct I have awarded him in the name of the President the Distinguished Service Cross."

Holland was promoted to captain. Once back in the U.S., he toured for the Victory Loan Drive. He then went to Fort Monroe, Virginia, where he resigned his commission in July 1919. Holland then resumed his law practice in Bartow.

== Early political career ==
Holland's return to his law practice was short-lived; he accepted an appointment as the Polk County prosecutor in late 1919. He left that position after being elected to a four-year term as a county judge in 1920. Re-elected in 1924, Holland left the judgeship at the end of his second term, in 1929. He then returned to private law practice, joining William F. Bevis to establish the firm of Holland & Bevis in Bartow. The firm grew rapidly, eventually becoming a large international law firm that still exists today as Holland & Knight.

In 1932, Holland was elected to the Florida Senate, where he served eight years. During his two terms, Holland was noted for his strong advocacy for public schools; as a member of the school committee, he drafted and cosponsored the Florida School Code and supported legislation that raised teachers' pay and retirement benefits. Holland also supported workers' compensation, tax cuts, and unemployment insurance. He was strongly opposed to both the sales tax and the poll tax, the latter of which he worked with fellow state Senator Ernest R. Graham to repeal in 1937.

Although Holland supported discrimination against African-American voters, he opposed the poll tax because he viewed it as a form of wealth discrimination that made voting difficult for both poor whites and poor African-Americans. Publicly, Holland cited two reasons for his opposition to the poll tax. The first was that he thought it allowed politicians to "buy" their way into office through political machines. Secondly, he thought that eliminating the poll tax would increase voter turnout in elections.

== Gubernatorial campaign ==
Holland announced he was running for governor on December 4, 1939, after considering running for U.S. senator but deciding against it. His campaign platform called for expanding assistance to the elderly through increasing a tax on horse and dog tracks, making highways safer, continuing a ban on poll taxes for state elections, creating Everglades National Park, giving state financial aid for economic development, regulating salary buyers (loan sharks), repealing the gross receipts tax, and improving working conditions in Florida. He also pitched himself as being hard on crime but for tourism in the state. Holland also identified himself with the progressive policies of the Roosevelt Administration, expressing his support in late 1940 for a number of New Deal measures that he felt had benefited moderate income groups and the middle class such as social security and rural electrification.

In the initial primary, Holland finished first but failed to attain the required majority of the vote. Advancing to a runoff, he faced Francis P. Whitehair, who attacked Holland throughout the runoff campaign. Whitehair said in a speech that Holland was a candidate for "'an invisible government' of duPont interests, chain stores, and a fertilizer trust." Holland, for his part, charged that Whitehair was a product of a political machine; Whitehair accused Holland of the same thing.

Holland ended up winning the runoff. For the general election, the Republicans nominated John F. Walter as their candidate for governor, but he ended up dropping out; Walter's party then was a distinct minority in Florida. Holland ended up winning the general election even more easily than Democrats usually did at the time.

== Governorship ==
=== Overview ===
While governor, Holland promoted the establishment of military bases in his state. He also supported the state public school system's financial condition. A variety of financial reforms were also undertaken during his tenure.

=== 1941 ===
Holland was sworn in as governor of Florida on January 7, 1941. As governor, his powers were limited. Under the 1885 Florida Constitution, the governor could only serve for one four-year term and the governorship was described as being a weak position. Holland also had to compete with the influence of Cabinet members who could be re-elected.

Concerns about World War II were dominant with audiences during Holland's campaign for governor; he wished for peace but said that preparations should be made in case of American involvement in the war. He began those preparations with a review of $7 million in State Road Department contracts made during the administration of his predecessor as governor, Fred P. Cone. Holland and his wife attended President Franklin D. Roosevelt's third inauguration and while in Washington, D.C., he spoke with federal authorities and Florida's congressional delegation about getting more money for defense road construction; he was successful in obtaining the funds. Florida saw an increase in military activities during the mobilization prior to entering World War II.

When Holland became governor, he attempted to improve Florida's record on lynching. Florida, like the rest of the Southern U.S., faced pressure to take action on lynching during the 1940s. Holland's first challenge came on May 12, 1941, when 22-year-old A.C. Williams, an African-American accused of raping a 12-year-old girl and committing a robbery, was abducted in Quincy, Florida and lynched. Afterward, there was pressure on the local government to act as it was feared that the federal government would become involved; pressure was also seen from the Association of Southern Women for the Prevention of Lynching (ASWPL), who wrote letters to Holland. In response, Holland called for an investigation into the death of Williams and named Maurice Tripp as the special investigator. A spokesperson for Holland said: "he would be able to reach a decision on whether any action by him against Quincy law enforcement authorities was justified. The pressure of legislative business on the governor was heavy, and the inquest transcript is long." Tripp submitted a report to Governor Holland on May 25, 1941, and in July 1942 the case was given to the United States Department of Justice, which reviewed it. The identities of those who killed Williams were never discovered.

When American involvement in World War II began with the attack on Pearl Harbor, Holland promoted new military bases in Florida and co-ordinated state defenses with the federal government. Governor Holland put the Florida Highway Patrol on standby to assist the Federal Bureau of Investigation with taking Japanese Americans and foreigners into custody.

The impact of World War II was felt at a more personal level in Holland's life as well. One of his sons, Spessard Holland Jr., served as a Marine in the South Pacific. The family planted a victory garden and set up a chicken coop at the Governor's Mansion. Holland's daughter Mary volunteered as an aircraft spotter, while his daughter Ivanhoe and his wife Mary sewed squares to be used in quilts sent to U.S. troops. The mansion was visited by British soldiers who were training in the area; the First Lady corresponded with the soldiers' mothers.

=== 1942 ===
When the United States entered World War II, German admiral Karl Dönitz launched Operation Drumbeat starting in January 1942, in an effort to cause significant damage to American shipping along the Eastern seaboard and the Gulf Coast. Except for a brief lull in March, U-boat activity on Florida's coasts lasted until April. As a result of the U-boat activity, tourism declined in the state, and the idea of building the Cross Florida Barge Canal was revived. Holland was neutral on the canal compared to U.S. senators Charles O. Andrews and Claude Pepper, who strongly supported it. Holland said the reason behind his neutrality was because the canal itself was incredibly controversial.

During the 1942 general election, Holland participated despite not being up for re-election. He traveled throughout the state making public appearances in an attempt to generate interest in the election, trying to get a gas tax amendment passed. Holland made a statewide radio address urging people to vote. That year nine amendments were on the ballot, and Holland backed three of them: an amendment that would streamline the process for amending the state constitution, the gas tax amendment and another that would create a state freshwater fish & game commission. All nine amendments passed that year with almost no opposition.

=== 1943 ===
During 1943 there were calls for a special session of the state legislature. State Senator Wallace E. Sturgis, from Ocala, wanted a special session to revise an absentee-voting law to allow Floridians serving in the military outside the state to register to vote. Sturgis later got the backing of the president pro tempore of the Senate, Ernest F. Householder. Those wanting to repeal the cigarette tax also joined in calling for a special session. Holland reacted to this by attempting to reduce enthusiasm for a special session. Regarding the absentee-voting law, Holland thought that it did a good job when it came to initial primaries except in instances of those who became 21 prior to leaving the state. However, he thought it was not practical with runoffs, as they were very close in time to the first contests, along with being able to send out and receive returned ballots as well. As for the cigarette tax, Holland opposed repealing it, as it could serve as a supplement in case other taxes were decreased. Holland also cited potential changes in wartime restrictions. Having a special session became a significant issue in the 1944 Democratic gubernatorial primaries.

During a conference in Denver, Colorado, Holland promoted new railroad freight prices, helping the Florida economy.

=== 1944 & 1945 ===
Holland was an outdoorsman and environmentalist. His negotiation of the purchase of Everglades wetland and marshland in 1944 helped lead to the establishment of Everglades National Park in 1947.

Holland's term ended on January 2, 1945, when Millard F. Caldwell took office.

== U.S. senator ==
On September 25, 1946, Governor Caldwell appointed Holland to fill the U.S. Senate vacancy created by the death of Charles O. Andrews a week earlier. In November, Holland defeated Republican J. Harry Schad to win a full six-year term.

Although identified with liberalism during his time as governor and early in his senate career, Holland later shifted towards conservatism. Like many Southern Democrats, Holland stood out as a conservative who was pro-business, supported racial segregation, staunchly opposed the civil rights movement and labor unions, and believed in a limited federal government and states' rights. He opposed Harry S. Truman's proposals for national health insurance and the Fair Employment Practices Commission, and voted to override Truman's veto of the Taft-Hartley Act. However, he accepted the elements of the New Deal that benefited Florida economically, much like other Southern politicians of his time. Holland's views contrasted with those of Claude Pepper, the senior U.S. senator from Florida during his first four years, who was a more outspoken liberal. Holland had bad relations with governors Daniel T. McCarty, who he described as being "cold" or "thorny," and LeRoy Collins, who openly disliked his record in the Senate.

=== First term ===
As he had in the Florida Senate, Holland supported abolishing the poll tax for federal elections during his time in the U.S. Senate, making an attempt to ban it during every session for a dozen years after arriving in Congress. During the 80th Congress, allies in the U.S. House of Representatives introduced H.R. 29, which passed the House on a 290-112 vote on July 21, 1947, but was filibustered in the Senate. During the following 81st Congress, H.R. 3199 was introduced; it passed the House on July 26, 1949, on a 273-116 vote, but failed to get past the Senate Committee on Rules and Administration. On other issues, Holland remained a segregationist who supported discrimination against Black voters, but maintained his view that the poll tax should be repealed because it was a form of wealth discrimination.

=== Second term ===
In 1952, Holland ran for re-election, winning a significantly larger margin of the vote (99.82%) than in the previous race in 1946 (78.65%). He, along with all other senators from the former Confederate states (except Lyndon B. Johnson, Estes Kefauver, and Albert Gore, Sr.), signed the 1956 "Southern Manifesto", which condemned the Supreme Court ruling in Brown v. Board of Education (1954), declaring that segregation of public schools was unconstitutional, and promised to resist its implementation.

Holland did favor statehood for Alaska and Hawaii. The first Southerner to support statehood for Hawaii, he voted for both the Alaska Statehood Act and the Hawaii Admission Act. Along with his support for Alaska's statehood, he introduced the two senators-elect from Alaska who were produced as a result of the Alaska-Tennessee Plan to the U.S. Senate: E.L. "Bob" Bartlett and Ernest Gruening.

=== Third term ===
Up for re-election in 1958, Holland was challenged by his former colleague Claude Pepper (who had been defeated for renomination in 1950) in the Democratic primary. After fending off Pepper's challenge, he easily defeated his Republican opponent, Leland Hyzer, in November to win a third term.

During the 87th Congress, Holland finally succeeded in his long-standing quest to ban the poll tax federally. Holland introduced a constitutional amendment that would prohibit states from conditioning the right to vote in federal elections on payment of a poll tax or other types of tax. The amendment was approved by a required two-thirds vote of both houses of Congress in August 1962 and was quickly ratified by the required three-fourths of the states (38), and in January 1964 became the Twenty-fourth Amendment to the United States Constitution. Described as a conservative Democrat, Holland believed in maintaining the filibuster and believed that civil rights was a matter for the states. Speaking in opposition to the Civil Rights Act of 1964, Holland said "We'll stand up and fight as long as we can".

On November 22, 1963, in the absence of Vice President Lyndon B. Johnson, Senator Edward M. Kennedy of Massachusetts was presiding over a routine session of the Senate, which was debating a bill about federal library services. It was almost time for a lunch break when staffer Richard Reidell came running into the chamber where he bumped into Holland, whispering that President John F. Kennedy had been shot and Holland was the first senator to be informed of it. Reidell told Senator Kennedy of the news about his brother. After hearing this Kennedy left and went to the lobby where he called the White House and his surviving brother, U.S. attorney general Robert F. Kennedy, before going to his office in the Senate Office Building. Holland replaced Kennedy as the presiding officer in the Senate when he left.

=== Fourth term ===
Holland won a fourth term in 1964, this time defeating Republican Claude R. Kirk, Jr. (who would be elected governor in 1966). In November 1969, at the age of 77, Holland announced that he would not seek re-election in 1970. He actively campaigned for Democrat Lawton Chiles, who defeated Republican U.S. representative William C. Cramer in the general election. Cramer had the endorsement of President Richard Nixon, and had handily defeated G. Harrold Carswell (whom Nixon had earlier nominated unsuccessfully to the U.S. Supreme Court) in the Republican primary.

== Personal life ==
Holland married Mary Agnes Groover (born July 31, 1896) on February 8, 1919, and they were together until his death. Together they had four children: Spessard Lindsey Holland Jr. (1921-1989), Mary Groover Holland Lewis (1924-1997), William Benjamin Holland (1926-1974) and Ivanhoe Holland Craney. Mary Holland died of a stroke on March 22, 1975, at age 78. In 1974, the city of Bartow had dedicated Mary Holland Park in her honor.

Spessard Holland was also a member of several fraternities during his life: Phi Beta Kappa, Alpha Tau Omega and Phi Delta Phi. His son Spessard Lindsey Holland, Jr. was a nonregistered member of Phi Delta Phi. He was involved with Freemasonry, being a 33rd degree and a Shriner. Holland also was a member of the Sons of the American Revolution, the American Legion, the Veterans of Foreign Wars, Bartow's Kiwanis club and the Elks. General James Van Fleet was a personal friend of Holland and supported his candidacy for governor.

He was described as being a conservationist and enjoyed birdwatching. Holland liked hunting and fishing as well. He was a fan of baseball and football and played tennis; he enjoyed collecting books on Florida history. While teaching in Georgia, he was known to have owned a motorcycle and crashed it many times; once he was flung 60 feet from it and landed scraping much of the skin from his back.

Holland left office in January 1971. He died of a heart attack at his Bartow home only ten months later, on November 6, 1971, at age 79.

== Honors and degrees ==
He received several honorary degrees:

- Rollins College (Bachelor of Laws, 1941)
- Florida Southern College (Bachelor of Laws, 1941)
- Florida State University (Bachelor of Laws, 1941)
- Emory University (Bachelor of Laws, 1941)
- Florida State University (Bachelor of Laws, 1956)
- University of Miami (Bachelor of Laws, 1962)
- University of Florida (Doctor of Comparative/Civil Law, 1953)
- University of Tampa (HHD, 1956)
- Stetson University College of Law (Doctor of Laws, 1970)

Several buildings and public facilities are named after Holland:

- The Spessard L. Holland Law Center, the administrative building at the Levin College of Law at the University of Florida;
- The Holland State Building in Tallahassee;
- The Spessard Holland Golf Course, Park, and Community Center, and the Spessard Holland Beaches, North and South, in Melbourne Beach;
- The Spessard L. Holland Elementary School in his hometown of Bartow;
- The Spessard L. Holland Elementary School in Satellite Beach, "Home of the Holland Hornets";
- The Spessard Holland East-West Expressway (State Road 408); and
- The section of U.S. Highway 17 in Holland's hometown of Bartow is known as the Spessard Holland Parkway.

Party political offices
Preceded by Fred P. Cone	Democratic nominee for Governor of Florida; 1940	Succeeded by Millard Caldwell
Preceded by Charles O. Andrews	Democratic nominee for U.S. Senator from Florida (Class 1); 1946, 1952, 1958, 1964	Succeeded by Lawton Chiles
Political offices
Preceded by Fred P. Cone	Governor of Florida; 1941–1945	Succeeded by Millard F. Caldwell
U.S. Senate
Preceded by Charles O. Andrews	U.S. senator (Class 1) from Florida; 1946–1971; Served alongside: Claude Pepper, George Smathers, Edward J. Gurney	Succeeded by Lawton Chiles
