= 1964 United States Senate election in Florida =

- November 3, 1964
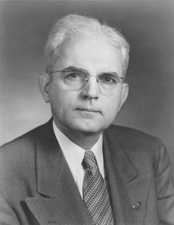

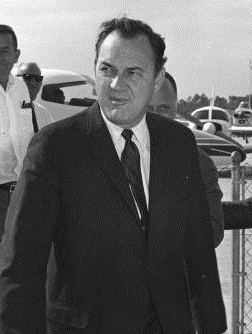
Nominee	Spessard Holland	Claude R. Kirk Jr.
Party	Democratic	Republican
Popular vote	997,585	562,212
Percentage	63.93%	36.03%
- County results Holland: 50–60% 60–70% 70–80% 80–90% Kirk: 50–60%
U.S. senator before election
Spessard Holland
Democratic
Elected U.S. Senator
Spessard Holland
Democratic

The 1964 United States Senate election in Florida was held on November 3, 1964. Incumbent Democratic U.S. Senator Spessard Holland was re-elected to a fourth term in office, defeating J. Brailey Oldham in the primary and Republican Claude R. Kirk Jr. in the general election. Kirk would go on to be elected governor in 1966. This was the first time since 1950 that a Republican won a county in a U.S. Senate race in Florida.

== Democratic primary ==
=== Candidates ===
- Spessard Holland, incumbent U.S. Senator
- J. Brailey Oldham, former state representative and candidate for governor in 1952 and 1954

28.4% of the voting age population participated in the Democratic primary.

=== Results ===
1964 Democratic U.S. Senate primary
Party	Candidate	Votes	%
Democratic	Spessard Holland (inc.)	676,014	70.02%
Democratic	J. Brailey Oldham	289,454	29.98%
Total votes		965,468	100.00%

== General election ==
=== Major candidates ===
- Spessard Holland (D), incumbent Senator
- Claude R. Kirk Jr. (R), Florida campaign manager for Richard Nixon in 1960

=== Results ===
1964 United States Senate election in Florida
Party	Candidate	Votes	%	±%
Democratic	Spessard Holland (inc.)	997,585	63.93%	▼7.30
Republican	Claude R. Kirk Jr.	562,212	36.03%	▲7.26
Write-in		540	0.04%	
Democratic hold		Swing	[?]	

== See also ==
- 1964 United States Senate elections

== Works cited ==
- Steed, Robert; Moreland, Laurence; Baker, Tod, eds. (1980). Party Politics in the South. Praeger Publishers. ISBN 0030565863.
