= Scott Loftin =

American politician (1878–1953)

Scott Marion Loftin
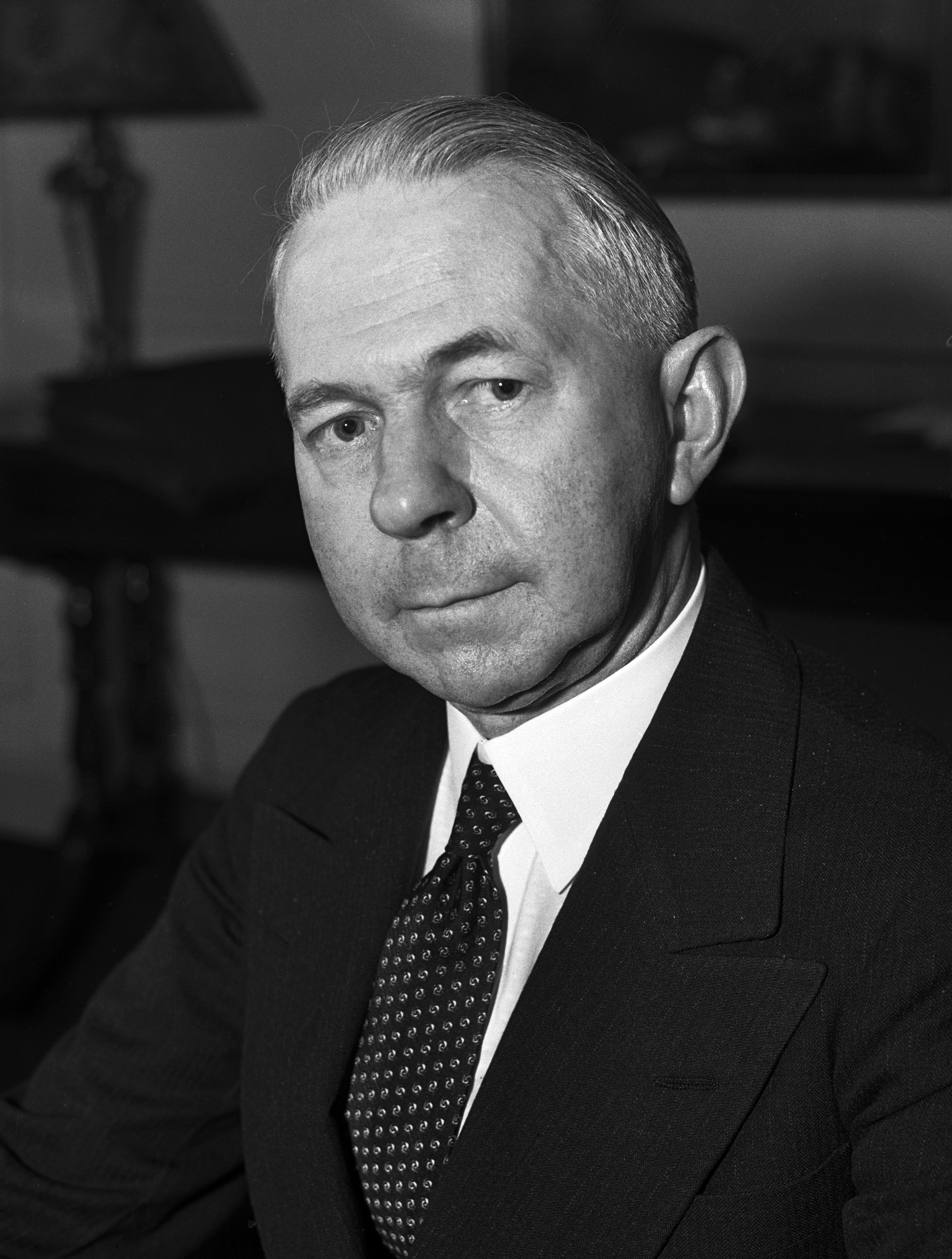

United States Senator from Florida
- In office May 26, 1936 – November 3, 1936
- Appointed by: David Sholtz
- Preceded by: Park Trammell
- Succeeded by: Charles O. Andrews

Member of the Florida House of Representatives
- In office 1903–1905

Personal details
- Born: September 14, 1878 Montgomery, Alabama, U.S.
- Died: September 22, 1953 (aged 75) Highlands, North Carolina, U.S.
- Party: Democratic

Scott Marion Loftin (September 14, 1878 – September 22, 1953) was a U.S. senator from Florida who served as a Democrat in 1936.

== Biography ==
Loftin was born in Montgomery, Montgomery County, Alabama. At the age of nine, he moved to Pensacola, Florida, with his parents in 1887. He attended the public schools and Washington and Lee University School of Law at Lexington, Virginia. He was admitted to the bar in 1899 and commenced practice in Pensacola, Florida. Loftin was a member of the Florida House of Representatives between 1903-1905 and was prosecuting attorney of Escambia County, Florida between 1904 and 1917. He moved to Jacksonville, Florida, in 1917 to continue the practice of law.

Loftin became a member of the Attorney General's Advisory Committee on Crime in 1934 and president of the American Bar Association in 1934. He became a general counsel for the Florida East Coast Railway between 1931-1941 and for a variety of other transportation-related businesses. He was a businessman with interests in railroads, shipping, and newspapers.

On May 26, 1936, he was appointed as a Democrat to the United States Senate to fill the vacancy caused by the death of Park Trammell and served from May 26 to November 3, 1936, when a successor was elected. Loftin was not a candidate for election to fill the vacancy. He resumed the practice of law in Jacksonville, Fla., until his death in Highlands, North Carolina.

U.S. Senate
Preceded by Park Trammell	United States Senator (Class 1) from Florida; 1936	Succeeded by Charles O. Andrews
