= John F. Floberg =

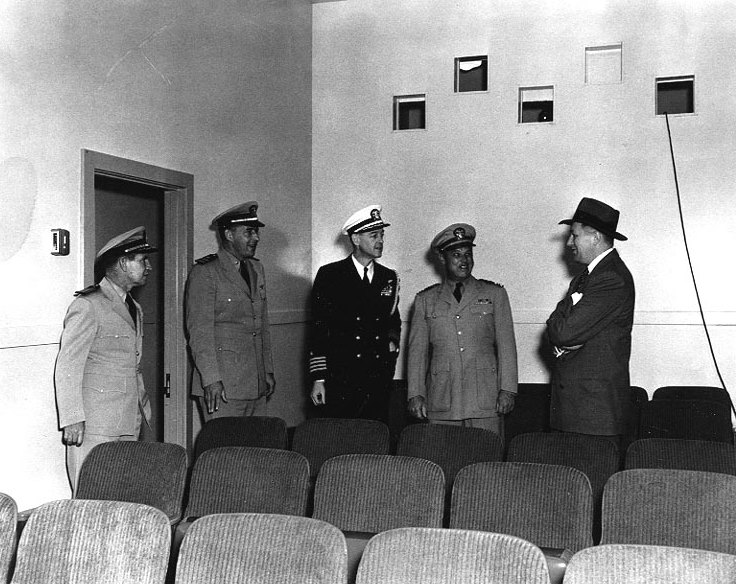
During a March 15, 1952 inspection of the El Centro Naval Air Station, John F. Floberg (right) meets with (left to right): Captain Robert N. Hunter, USN; Lieutenant Commander John A. Morrison, USN; Captain John S. Thach, USN, and Lieutenant Commander B.L. Tacker, USNR.

John Forrest Floberg (October 28, 1915 – August 29, 2011) was the United States Assistant Secretary of the Navy (AIR) from 1949 to 1953.

== Biography ==
=== Early life ===
Born in 1915, John F. Floberg was a lawyer. He also graduated from the United States armed forces' training course in atomic weapons at the Sandia National Laboratories at Kirtland Air Force Base outside Albuquerque, New Mexico.

=== Adult life ===
President of the United States Harry S. Truman named Floberg as Assistant Secretary of the Navy (AIR) in 1949, and Floberg held this office from December 5, 1949, through July 23, 1953. During this period, Floberg was a strong supporter of Admiral Hyman G. Rickover's proposals to create a nuclear navy; together, Floberg and Rickover eventually convinced Admiral William Fechteler, Chief of Naval Operations, to support the construction of atomic carriers.

In 1957, President Dwight D. Eisenhower appointed Floberg as one of five members of the United States Atomic Energy Commission, and Floberg served on that commission from October 1, 1957, until June 23, 1960.

In 1960, Floberg moved to Akron, Ohio to become General Counsel of the Firestone Tire and Rubber Company. He later became a vice president and a member of Firestone's executive committee.

Government offices
Preceded by Dan A. Kimball	Assistant Secretary of the Navy (AIR); December 5, 1949 – July 23, 1953	Succeeded by James H. Smith Jr.
