= Charles O. Andrews =

American politician (1877–1946)

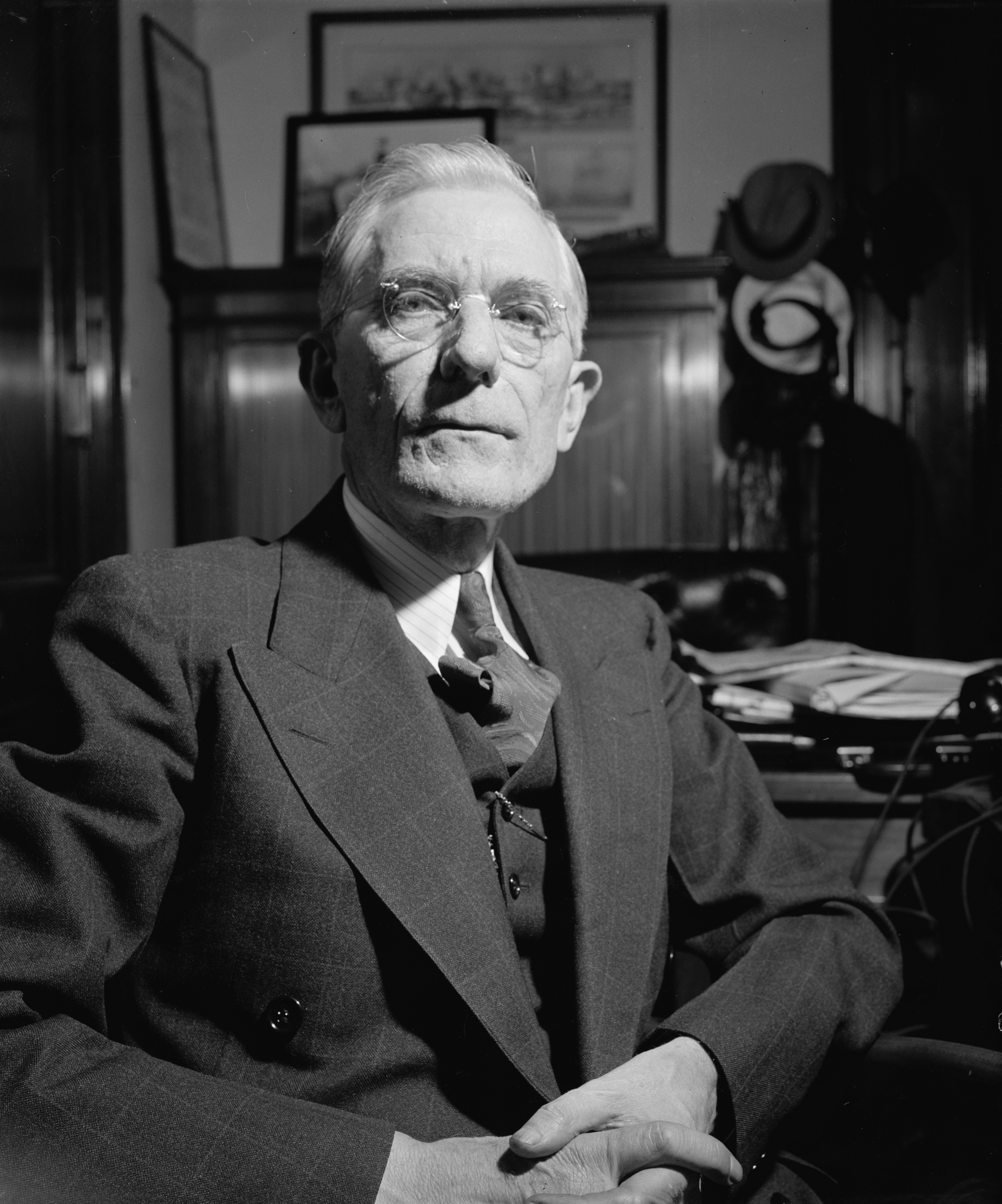

United States Senator from Florida
- In office November 4, 1936 – September 18, 1946
- Preceded by: Scott Loftin
- Succeeded by: Spessard Holland

Member of the Florida House of Representatives
- In office 1927

Personal details
- Born: March 7, 1877 Ponce de Leon, Florida, U.S.
- Died: September 18, 1946 (aged 69) Washington, D.C., U.S.
- Party: Democratic
- Spouse: Margaret Lee Spears (m. 1909)
- Children: Charles O. Andrews Jr. and 4 others
- Education: University of Florida

Military service
- Branch/service: United States National Guard
- Years of service: 1903–1905
- Rank: Captain
- Unit: Florida
- Battles/wars: Spanish–American War

Charles Oscar Andrews (March 7, 1877 – September 18, 1946) was a Democratic Party politician who represented Florida in the United States Senate from 1936 until 1946.

== Early life ==
Charles O. Andrews was born in Ponce de Leon, Florida, in 1877. He attended public school and the South Florida Military Institute at Bartow, Florida. In 1901 he graduated from the Florida State Normal School at Gainesville, Florida, and the University of Florida at Gainesville in 1907.

== Military service and early career ==
During the Spanish–American War he served as a captain in the Florida National Guard from 1903–1905. Andrews became secretary of the Florida State Senate, holding that position from 1905–1907. About the same time he began studying law. He was admitted to the bar in 1907 and commenced practicing law in DeFuniak Springs, Florida. He returned to the Florida State Senate as secretary from 1909-1911. He was appointed judge of the criminal court of record of Walton County, Florida, 1910–1911, assistant attorney general of Florida 1912–1919, then circuit judge of the seventeenth judicial circuit 1919–1925. Subsequent state positions were as general counsel of the Florida Real Estate Commission 1925–1928, member of the Florida House of Representatives in 1927, attorney for Orlando, Florida, 1926–1929, and State supreme court commissioner 1929–1932.

== U.S. Senator ==
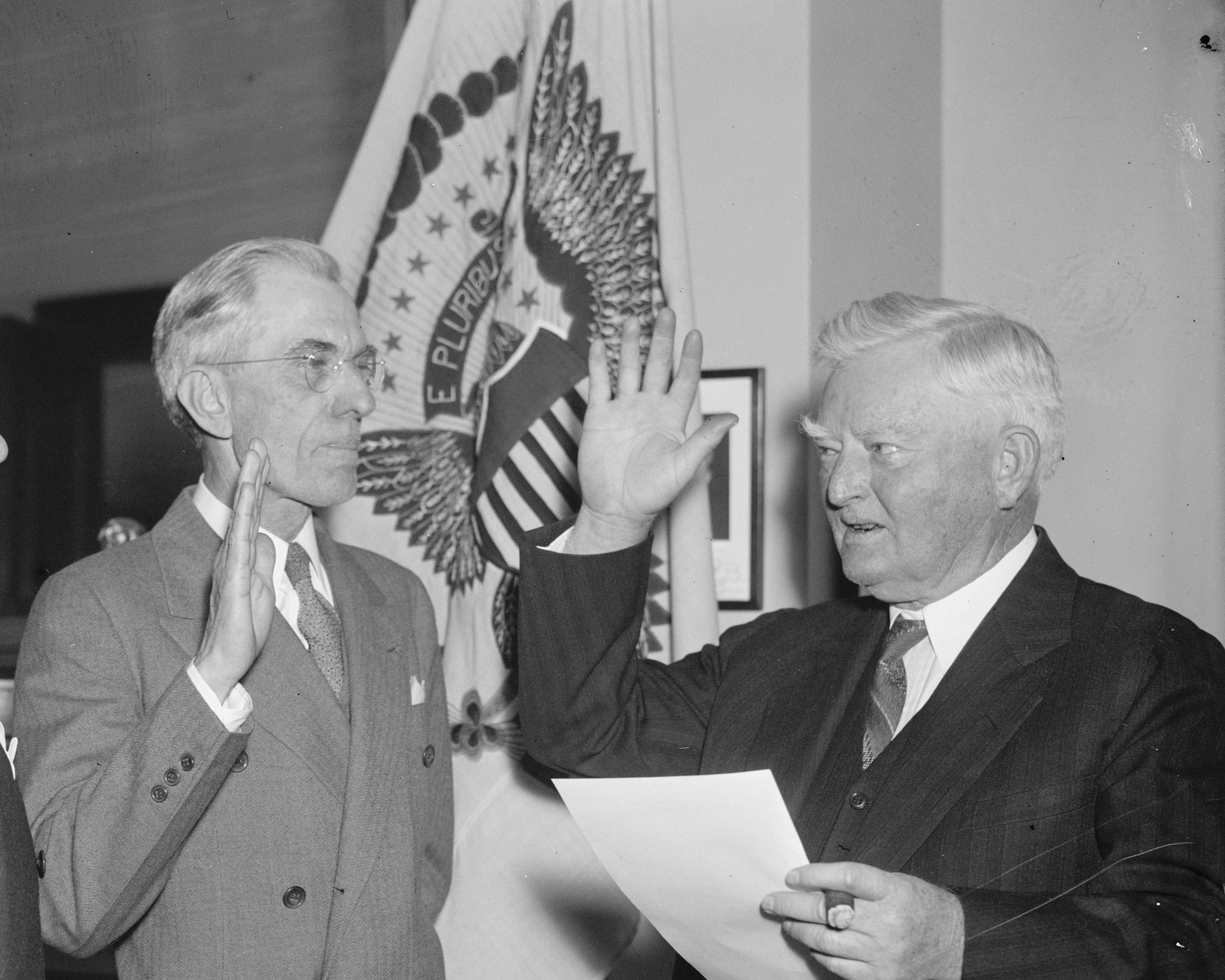
Vice President Garner administers oath to new Florida Senator Charles O. Andrews in Washington, D.C., on December 8, 1936.

On November 3, 1936, voters elected Andrews to Congress as a Democrat to the United States Senate to fill the vacancy caused by the death of Park Trammell. In early October 1940, a story spread that he would rather be a federal judge than a U.S. Senator. After this it was speculated that US President Franklin Delano Roosevelt would appoint Andrews to a federal judge seat in Tampa. This speculation later ended in late October when U.S. Senator Claude Pepper from Florida met with President Roosevelt to discuss possible candidates to succeed Judge Ackerman's and Pepper was informed by officials that Andrews exceeded the administrations age limit of 60 as he was 62. Andrews was re-elected in 1940 without opposition in the general election. Andrews continued to serve until his death in Washington, D.C., on September 18, 1946.

Notably, in 1943, he would attempt to repeal the Chinese Exclusion Act. On September 30, 1943, Andrews proposed S.1404 in the Senate, which would have repealed the Chinese Exclusion Act and was identical to the bill that was proposed by Warren Magnuson of Washington in the House of Representatives. Ultimately, the bill proposed by Andrews did not go through, as the Senate Committee on Immigration decided that it would be quicker to go through the House bill. The House bill would end up passing the House and later the Senate before being signed into law on December 17 by President Roosevelt.

During his time in the United States Senate, he was chairman of the Committee on Enrolled Bills (Seventy-ninth United States Congress), served with the Committee on Public Buildings and Grounds (79th Congress), and on the Special Committee on Reconstruction of the Senate Roof and Skylights (79th Congress). He is interred in Greenwood Cemetery.

== See also ==
- List of members of the United States Congress who died in office (1900–1949)

Party political offices
Preceded by Park Trammell	Democratic nominee for U.S. Senator from Florida (Class 1); 1936, 1940	Succeeded by Spessard Holland
U.S. Senate
Preceded by Scott Loftin	U.S. senator (Class 1) from Florida; 1936–1946	Succeeded by Spessard Holland
