= List of appointed United States senators =

This article lists all appointed United States senators since the 1913 ratification of the Seventeenth Amendment to the United States Constitution which established the direct election of senators, as well as means of filling vacant Senate seats.

== Text of the Seventeenth Amendment to the United States Constitution ==
The Senate of the United States shall be composed of two Senators from each State, elected by the people thereof, for six years; and each Senator shall have one vote. The electors in each State shall have the qualifications requisite for electors of the most numerous branch of the State legislatures.

When vacancies happen in the representation of any State in the Senate, the executive authority of such State shall issue writs of election to fill such vacancies: Provided, That the legislature of any State may empower the executive thereof to make temporary appointments until the people fill the vacancies by election as the legislature may direct.

This amendment shall not be so construed as to affect the election or term of any Senator chosen before it becomes valid as part of the Constitution.

== Gubernatorial appointment governing Senate vacancies ==
Laws per state for filling vacancies in the U.S. Senate Filled by gubernatorial appointment until next statewide election Filled by gubernatorial appointment, followed by proximate special election No gubernatorial appointment, filled by proximate special election ● Requires appointee from same party as the previous incumbent

=== Filling vacancies by special election ===
The following states require Senate vacancies to be filled only by elections and do not allow state governors to fill them through appointments.

- Kentucky
- North Dakota
- Rhode Island
- Wisconsin

=== Filling vacancies by gubernatorial appointment followed by a proximate special election ===
The following 10 states allow state governors to fill Senate vacancies through appointments. However, a special election must be held within a few months of the vacancy.

- Alabama
- Alaska
- Connecticut
- Louisiana
- Massachusetts
- Mississippi
- Oregon (Note: Disallows the governor to appoint oneself as senator.) (Note: Requires the governor to appoint a replacement senator from the same party as the previous incumbent.)
- Texas
- Vermont
- Washington

=== Filling vacancies by gubernatorial appointment through the next election ===
The following 36 states allow state governors to fill Senate vacancies through appointments. An appointed senator may serve out the balance of the term or until after the next statewide general election. State laws vary on what constitutes the next general election, depending on the timing of the vacancy.

- Arizona
- Arkansas
- California
- Colorado
- Delaware
- Florida
- Georgia
- Hawaii (Note: Requires the governor to select a candidate from a list of three prospective appointees submitted by the party of the previous incumbent.)
- Idaho
- Illinois
- Indiana
- Iowa
- Kansas (Note: Requires the governor to select a nominee from a list of three people in the adopted concurrent resolution or joint committee report.)
- Maine
- Maryland
- Michigan
- Minnesota
- Missouri
- Montana
- Nebraska
- Nevada
- New Hampshire
- New Jersey
- New Mexico
- New York
- North Carolina
- Ohio
- Oklahoma
- Pennsylvania
- South Carolina
- South Dakota
- Tennessee
- Utah
- Virginia
- West Virginia
- Wyoming

== Appointments of senators-elect to the Senate ==
In the past, retiring or defeated senators often resigned after the general election but before the expiration of their term due to various reasons.

One of the common reason was to allow state governors to appoint their successors to the vacated seat. This enabled their successors to gain extra seniority over other freshmen senators for the purposes of obtaining choice committee assignments. This practice ended in 1980 after both parties established new party rules that no longer gave seniority to senators who entered Congress early by being appointed to fill the vacancy just before the end of a Congress. Seniority still counted in obtaining choice of office and parking space assignments.

In the election years of 1966, 1974, and 1978, changes to pension laws made it advantageous for senators to resign before December 31, rather than wait until their term expired in early January, contributing to the increase in the number of appointed senators.

In addition, 3 senators died after the election of their successors, allowing their successors to be appointed and take office early.

- Joseph M. McCormick (Illinois)
- James J. Couzens (Michigan)
- Philip Hart (Michigan)

== Number of appointed senators since the ratification of the Seventeenth Amendment ==
There have been a total of 255 senators appointed to the United States Senate since the 1913 ratification of the Seventeenth Amendment, including 208 appointments made before the next scheduled or special election and 47 appointments made of senators-elect who have already been elected to the seat.

Number of appointed senators by state
State	Appointment made		Total
State	Before election	After election	Total
Alabama	6	1	7
Alaska	2	0	2
Arizona	2	0	2
Arkansas	3	0	3
California	7	5	12
Colorado	4	0	4
Connecticut	3	0	3
Delaware	3	1	4
Florida	6	2	8
Georgia	6	0	6
Hawaii	2	0	2
Idaho	6	1	7
Illinois	3	1	4
Indiana	4	0	4
Iowa	2	0	2
Kansas	4	1	5
Kentucky	8	2	10
Louisiana	4	1	5
Maine	1	0	1
Maryland	0	0	0
Massachusetts	5	1	6
Michigan	4	2	6
Minnesota	7	1	8
Mississippi	3	1	4
Missouri	5	3	8
Montana	3	1	4
Nebraska	6	2	8
Nevada	5	1	6
New Hampshire	5	2	7
New Jersey	9	2	11
New Mexico	5	0	5
New York	3	0	3
North Carolina	7	0	7
North Dakota	4	1	5
Ohio	7	3	10
Oklahoma	2	0	2
Oregon	4	1	5
Pennsylvania	5	0	5
Rhode Island	2	1	3
South Carolina	8	2	10
South Dakota	3	1	4
Tennessee	5	0	5
Texas	4	1	5
Utah	0	1	1
Vermont	5	0	5
Virginia	4	2	6
Washington	3	3	6
West Virginia	4	0	4
Wisconsin	0	0	0
Wyoming	5	1	6
Total	208	47	255

== List of individuals appointed to the Senate ==
The following is a list of individuals appointed to the Senate preceding an election. Only appointments made after the ratification of the Seventeenth Amendment, which established the direct election of senators, are included. The Senate Historical Office does not maintain records of senators who were appointed before the passage of the Seventeenth Amendment.

For a list of senators-elect appointed to the Senate after being elected, see List of senators-elect appointed to the Senate.

Key

Democratic Party	Republican Party	North Dakota Nonpartisan League	Minnesota Farmer–Labor Party	Minnesota Democratic–Farmer–Labor Party	North Dakota Democratic–Nonpartisan League Party	Independence Party of Minnesota

Currently serving

State (Senate Class)	Name	Appointee's tenure during unexpired term (Note: "Unexpired terms occur when there is a vacancy due to death or resignation and a senator is either appointed or elected for the term remaining." – The Term of Senator: When Does It Begin and End? Terms of senators who are reelected in subsequent scheduled elections are not reflected in the tenure listed in this table.)			Appointee's electoral history		Appointer	Succeeded	Ref.
State (Senate Class)	Name	Start (Note: Determined by the commencement of the Senate term, as according to the chronological list of Senators.)	End	Duration	Next election	Elections won	Appointer	Succeeded	Ref.
Georgia (Class 2)	William Stanley West (D)	March 2, 1914	November 3, 1914	246 days	Did not seek election.	–	John M. Slaton (D)	Augustus Octavius Bacon (D)	
Kentucky (Class 3)	Johnson N. Camden Jr. (D)	June 16, 1914	March 4, 1915	261 days	Elected in the 1914 special election.	1914 (Special)	James B. McCreary (D)	William O'Connell Bradley (R)	
Indiana (Class 3)	Thomas Taggart (D)	March 20, 1916	November 7, 1916	232 days	Defeated in the 1916 special election.	–	Samuel M. Ralston (D)	Benjamin F. Shively (D)	
Oregon (Class 2)	Charles L. McNary (R)	May 29, 1917	November 5, 1918	1 year, 160 days	Did not run in the 1918 special election but was elected in the 1918 election held on the same day.	1918; 1924; 1930; 1936; 1942	James Withycombe (R)	Harry Lane (D)	
Nevada (Class 3)	Charles Henderson (D)	January 12, 1918	March 4, 1921	3 years, 51 days	Elected in the 1918 special election.	1918 (Special)	Emmet D. Boyle (D)	Francis G. Newlands (D)	
Idaho (Class 3)	John F. Nugent (D)	January 22, 1918	January 14, 1921	2 years, 358 days	Elected in the 1918 special election.	1918 (Special)	Moses Alexander (D)	James H. Brady (R)	
New Jersey (Class 2)	David Baird Sr. (R)	February 23, 1918	March 4, 1919	1 year, 9 days	Elected in the 1918 special election.	1918 (Special)	Walter Evans Edge (R)	William Hughes (D)	
Louisiana (Class 3)	Walter Guion (D)	April 22, 1918	November 5, 1918	197 days	Did not seek election.	–	Ruffin Pleasant (D)	Robert F. Broussard (D)	
Missouri (Class 3)	Xenophon P. Wilfley (D)	April 30, 1918	November 5, 1918	189 days	Lost nomination to run in the 1918 special election.	–	Frederick D. Gardner (D)	William J. Stone (D)	
South Carolina (Class 2)	Christie Benet (D)	July 6, 1918	November 5, 1918	122 days	Lost nomination to run in the 1918 special election.	–	Richard Irvine Manning III (D)	Benjamin Tillman (D)	
New Hampshire (Class 3)	Irving W. Drew (R)	September 2, 1918	November 5, 1918	64 days	Did not seek election.	–	Henry W. Keyes (R)	Jacob Harold Gallinger (R)	
Kentucky (Class 2)	George B. Martin (D)	September 7, 1918	March 4, 1919	178 days	Did not seek election to the next term.	–	Augustus Owsley Stanley (D)	Ollie Murray James (D)	
Virginia (Class 2)	Carter Glass (D)	February 2, 1920	March 4, 1925	5 years, 30 days	Elected in the 1920 special election.	1920 (Special); 1924; 1930; 1936; 1942	Westmoreland Davis (D)	Thomas S. Martin (D)	
Alabama (Class 2)	B. B. Comer (D)	March 5, 1920	November 2, 1920	242 days	Did not seek election.	–	Thomas Kilby (D)	John H. Bankhead (D)	
New Mexico (Class 2)	Holm O. Bursum (R)	March 11, 1921	March 4, 1925	3 years, 358 days	Elected in the 1921 special election.	1921 (Special)	Merritt C. Mechem (R)	Albert B. Fall (R)	
Delaware (Class 1)	T. Coleman du Pont (R)	July 7, 1921	November 7, 1922	1 year, 123 days	Defeated in the 1922 special election.	1924	William D. Denney (R)	Josiah O. Wolcott (D)	
Pennsylvania (Class 1)	William E. Crow (R)	October 24, 1921	August 2, 1922	282 days	Died in office.	–	William Cameron Sproul (R)	Philander C. Knox (R)	
Pennsylvania (Class 3)	George W. Pepper (R)	January 9, 1922	March 4, 1927	5 years, 54 days	Elected in the 1922 special election.	1922 (Special)	William Cameron Sproul (R)	Boies Penrose (R)	
Iowa (Class 2)	Charles A. Rawson (R)	February 24, 1922	November 7, 1922	256 days	Did not seek election.	–	Nathan E. Kendall (R)	William S. Kenyon (R)	
Pennsylvania (Class 1)	David A. Reed (R)	August 8, 1922	March 4, 1923	208 days	Elected in the 1922 special election.	1922 (Special); 1922; 1928	William Cameron Sproul (R)	William E. Crow (R) (Note: The Senate seat was first vacated by William E. Crow. David A. Reed was appointed to the seat after the previous interim appointee, Philander C. Knox, died.)	
Georgia (Class 3)	Rebecca Latimer Felton (D)	October 3, 1922	November 22, 1922	50 days	Did not seek election.	–	Thomas W. Hardwick (D)	Thomas E. Watson (D)	
Michigan (Class 2)	James J. Couzens (R)	November 29, 1922	March 4, 1925	2 years, 95 days	Elected in the 1924 election.	1924; 1930	Alex J. Groesbeck (R)	Truman Handy Newberry (R)	
Colorado (Class 3)	Alva B. Adams (D)	May 17, 1923	November 30, 1924	1 year, 197 days	Did not run in the 1924 special election and was defeated in the 1924 election.	1932; 1938	William Ellery Sweet (D)	Samuel D. Nicholson (R)	
Massachusetts (Class 1)	William M. Butler (R)	November 13, 1924	December 6, 1926	2 years, 23 days	Defeated in the 1926 special election.	–	Channing H. Cox (R)	Henry Cabot Lodge (R)	
Missouri (Class 3)	George Howard Williams (R)	May 25, 1925	December 5, 1926	1 year, 194 days	Defeated in the 1926 special election.	–	Sam Aaron Baker (R)	Selden P. Spencer (R)	
Indiana (Class 1)	Arthur Raymond Robinson (R)	October 20, 1925	March 4, 1929	3 years, 135 days	Elected in the 1926 special election.	1926 (Special); 1928	Edward L. Jackson (R)	Samuel M. Ralston (D)	
North Dakota (Class 3)	Gerald Nye (R)	November 14, 1925	March 4, 1927	1 year, 110 days	Elected in the 1926 special election.	1926 (Special); 1926; 1932; 1938	Arthur G. Sorlie (NPL)	Edwin F. Ladd (R)	
Iowa (Class 3)	David W. Stewart (R)	August 7, 1926	March 4, 1927	209 days	Elected in the 1926 special election.	1926 (Special)	John Hammill (R)	Albert B. Cummins (R)	
New Mexico (Class 1)	Bronson M. Cutting (R)	December 29, 1927	December 6, 1928	343 days	Did not run in the 1928 special election but was elected in the 1928 election held on the same day.	1928; 1934	Richard C. Dillon (R)	Andrieus A. Jones (D)	
Michigan (Class 1)	Arthur Vandenberg (R)	March 31, 1928	March 4, 1929	338 days	Elected in the 1928 elections.	1928 (Special); 1928; 1934; 1940; 1946	Fred W. Green (R)	Woodbridge N. Ferris (D)	
Ohio (Class 3)	Cyrus Locher (D)	April 4, 1928	December 14, 1928	254 days	Lost nomination to run in the 1928 special election.	–	A. Victor Donahey (D)	Frank B. Willis (R)	
Idaho (Class 3)	John Thomas (R)	June 30, 1928	March 4, 1933	4 years, 247 days	Elected in the 1928 special election.	1928 (Special); 1940 (Special); 1942	H. C. Baldridge (R)	Frank R. Gooding (R)	
Delaware (Class 2)	Daniel O. Hastings (R)	December 10, 1928	March 4, 1931	2 years, 84 days	Elected in the 1930 special election.	1930 (Special); 1930	Robert P. Robinson (R)	T. Coleman du Pont (R)	
Kansas (Class 3)	Henry Justin Allen (R)	April 1, 1929	November 30, 1930	1 year, 243 days	Defeated in the 1930 special election.	–	Clyde M. Reed (R)	Charles Curtis (R)	
Tennessee (Class 2)	William Emerson Brock (D)	September 2, 1929	March 4, 1931	1 year, 183 days	Did not seek election to the next term.	–	Henry Hollis Horton (D)	Lawrence Tyson (D)	
Ohio (Class 3)	Roscoe C. McCulloch (R)	November 5, 1929	November 30, 1930	1 year, 25 days	Defeated in the 1930 special election.	–	Myers Y. Cooper (R)	Theodore E. Burton (R) (Note: The Senate seat was first vacated by Frank B. Willis. Roscoe C. McCulloch was appointed to the seat early after the previous incumbent, Theodore E. Burton, died.)	
New Jersey (Class 2)	David Baird Jr. (R)	November 30, 1929	December 2, 1930	1 year, 2 days	Did not seek election to the next term.	–	Morgan Foster Larson (R)	Walter Evans Edge (R)	
Wyoming (Class 2)	Patrick Joseph Sullivan (R)	December 5, 1929	November 20, 1930	350 days	Did not seek election to the next term.	–	Frank Emerson (R)	Francis E. Warren (R)	
Pennsylvania (Class 3)	Joseph R. Grundy (R)	December 11, 1929	December 1, 1930	355 days	Lost nomination to run in the 1930 special election.	–	John Stuchell Fisher (R)	William Scott Vare (R) (Note: Senator-elect)	
Kentucky (Class 2)	John M. Robsion (R)	January 11, 1930	November 30, 1930	323 days	Defeated in the 1930 special election.	–	Flem D. Sampson (R)	Frederic M. Sackett (R)	
North Carolina (Class 3)	Cameron A. Morrison (D)	December 13, 1930	December 4, 1932	1 year, 357 days	Lost nomination to run in the 1932 special election.	–	Oliver Max Gardner (D)	Lee Slater Overman (D)	
Vermont (Class 1)	Frank C. Partridge (R)	December 23, 1930	March 31, 1931	98 days	Lost nomination to run in the 1931 special election.	–	John E. Weeks (R)	Frank L. Greene (R)	
Arkansas (Class 3)	Hattie Wyatt Caraway (D)	November 13, 1931	March 4, 1933	1 year, 111 days	Elected in the 1932 special election.	1932 (Special); 1932; 1938	Harvey Parnell (D)	Thaddeus H. Caraway (D)	
New Jersey (Class 2)	William Warren Barbour (R)	December 1, 1931	March 4, 1933	1 year, 93 days	Elected in the 1932 special election.	1932 (Special); 1938 (Special); 1940	Morgan Foster Larson (R)	Dwight Morrow (R)	
Georgia (Class 2)	John S. Cohen (D)	April 25, 1932	January 11, 1933	261 days	Did not seek election.	–	Richard Russell Jr. (D)	William J. Harris (D)	
Colorado (Class 3)	Walter Walker (D)	September 26, 1932	December 6, 1932	71 days	Defeated in the 1932 special election.	–	Billy Adams (D)	Charles W. Waterman (R)	
Washington (Class 3)	Elijah S. Grammer (R)	November 22, 1932	March 4, 1933	102 days	Did not seek election to the next term.	–	Roland H. Hartley (R)	Wesley Livsey Jones (R)	
Tennessee (Class 2)	Nathan L. Bachman (D)	February 28, 1933	January 3, 1937	3 years, 310 days	Elected in the 1934 special election.	1934 (Special); 1936	Hill McAlister (D)	Cordell Hull (D)	
Virginia (Class 1)	Harry F. Byrd (D)	March 4, 1933	January 3, 1935	1 year, 305 days	Elected in the 1933 special election.	1933 (Special); 1934; 1940; 1946; 1952; 1958; 1964	John Garland Pollard (D)	Claude A. Swanson (D)	
Montana (Class 2)	John E. Erickson (D)	March 13, 1933	November 6, 1934	1 year, 238 days	Lost nomination to run in the 1934 special election.	–	Frank Henry Cooney (D)	Thomas J. Walsh (D)	
Nebraska (Class 1)	William Henry Thompson (D)	May 24, 1933	November 6, 1934	1 year, 166 days	Did not seek election to the next term.	–	Charles W. Bryan (D)	Robert B. Howell (R)	
New Mexico (Class 2)	Carl Hatch (D)	October 10, 1933	January 3, 1937	3 years, 85 days	Elected in the 1934 special election.	1934 (Special); 1936; 1942	Andrew W. Hockenhull (D)	Sam G. Bratton (D)	
Vermont (Class 3)	Ernest Willard Gibson (R)	November 21, 1933	January 3, 1939	5 years, 43 days	Elected in the 1934 special election.	1934 (Special); 1938	Stanley C. Wilson (R)	Porter H. Dale (R)	
Wyoming (Class 1)	Joseph C. O'Mahoney (D)	January 1, 1934	January 3, 1935	1 year, 2 days	Elected in the 1934 special election.	1934 (Special); 1934; 1940; 1946; 1954 (Special); 1954	Leslie A. Miller (D)	John B. Kendrick (D)	
New Mexico (Class 1)	Dennis Chávez (D)	May 11, 1935	January 3, 1941	5 years, 237 days	Elected in the 1936 special election.	1936 (Special); 1940; 1946; 1952; 1958	Clyde Tingley (D)	Bronson M. Cutting (R)	
Minnesota (Class 2)	Elmer Austin Benson (FL)	December 27, 1935	November 3, 1936	312 days	Did not seek election to the next term.	–	Floyd B. Olson (FL)	Thomas D. Schall (R)	
Louisiana (Class 2)	Rose McConnell Long (D)	January 31, 1936	January 3, 1937	338 days	Elected in the 1936 special election.	1936 (Special)	James A. Noe (D)	Huey Long (D)	
Florida (Class 1)	Scott Loftin (D)	May 26, 1936	November 3, 1936	161 days	Did not seek election.	–	David Sholtz (D)	Park Trammell (D)	
Florida (Class 3)	William Luther Hill (D)	July 1, 1936	November 3, 1936	125 days	Did not seek election.	–	David Sholtz (D)	Duncan U. Fletcher (D)	
South Dakota (Class 3)	Herbert E. Hitchcock (D)	December 29, 1936	November 8, 1938	1 year, 314 days	Lost nomination to run in the 1938 special election.	–	Tom Berry (D)	Peter Norbeck (R)	
Tennessee (Class 2)	George L. Berry (D)	May 6, 1937	November 8, 1938	1 year, 186 days	Lost nomination to run in the 1938 special election.	–	Gordon Browning (D)	Nathan L. Bachman (D)	
Alabama (Class 3)	Dixie Bibb Graves (D)	August 20, 1937	January 10, 1938	143 days	Did not seek election.	–	Bibb Graves (D)	Hugo Black (D)	
Alabama (Class 3)	J. Lister Hill (D)	January 11, 1938	January 3, 1939	357 days	Elected in the 1938 special election.	1938 (Special); 1938; 1944; 1950; 1956; 1962	Bibb Graves (D)	Dixie Bibb Graves (D) (Note: The Senate seat was first vacated by Hugo Black. J. Lister Hill was appointed to the seat after the previous interim appointee, Dixie Bibb Graves, resigned.)	
New Jersey (Class 1)	John Gerald Milton (D)	January 18, 1938	November 8, 1938	294 days	Did not seek election.	–	A. Harry Moore (D)	A. Harry Moore (D)	
Oregon (Class 3)	Alfred E. Reames (D)	February 1, 1938	November 8, 1938	280 days	Did not seek election to the next term.	–	Charles Martin (D)	Frederick Steiwer (R)	
California (Class 3)	Thomas M. Storke (D)	November 9, 1938	January 3, 1939	55 days	Did not seek election to the next term.	–	Frank Merriam (R)	William Gibbs McAdoo (D)	
Illinois (Class 2)	James M. Slattery (D)	April 14, 1939	November 21, 1940	1 year, 221 days	Defeated in the 1940 special election.	–	Henry Horner (D)	J. Hamilton Lewis (D)	
Kentucky (Class 2)	Happy Chandler (D)	October 10, 1939	January 3, 1943	3 years, 85 days	Elected in the 1940 special election.	1940 (Special); 1942	Keen Johnson (D)	M. M. Logan (D)	
Idaho (Class 2)	John Thomas (R)	January 27, 1940	January 3, 1943	2 years, 341 days	Elected in the 1940 special election.	1940 (Special); 1942	C. A. Bottolfsen (R)	William Borah (R)	
Vermont (Class 3)	Ernest W. Gibson Jr. (R)	June 24, 1940	January 3, 1941	342 days	Did not seek election.	–	George Aiken (R)	Ernest Willard Gibson (R)	
Minnesota (Class 2)	Joseph H. Ball (R)	October 14, 1940	November 17, 1942	2 years, 34 days	Did not run in the 1942 special election but was elected in the 1942 election held on the same day.	1942	Harold Stassen (R)	Ernest Lundeen (FL)	
Nevada (Class 1)	Berkeley L. Bunker (D)	November 27, 1940	December 6, 1942	2 years, 9 days	Lost nomination to run in the 1942 special election.	–	Edward P. Carville (D)	Key Pittman (D)	
West Virginia (Class 2)	Joseph Rosier (D)	January 13, 1941	November 17, 1942	1 year, 308 days	Defeated in the 1942 special election.	–	Matthew M. Neely (D)	Matthew M. Neely (D)	
Arkansas (Class 2)	Lloyd Spencer (D)	April 1, 1941	January 3, 1943	1 year, 277 days	Did not seek election to the next term.	–	Homer Martin Adkins (D)	John E. Miller (D) (Note: The Senate seat was first vacated by Joe T. Robinson. Lloyd Spencer was appointed to the seat after the previous interim appointee, John E. Miller, resigned to become a US District Judge.)	
Texas (Class 2)	Andrew Jackson Houston (D)	April 21, 1941	June 26, 1941	66 days	Died in office.	–	W. Lee O'Daniel (D)	Morris Sheppard (D)	
Mississippi (Class 2)	James Eastland (D)	June 30, 1941	September 28, 1941	90 days	Did not run in the 1941 special election but was elected in the 1942 election held in the following year.	1942; 1948; 1954; 1960; 1966; 1972	Paul B. Johnson Sr. (D)	Pat Harrison (D)	
South Carolina (Class 2)	Alva M. Lumpkin (D)	July 22, 1941	August 1, 1941	10 days	Died in office.	–	Burnet R. Maybank (D)	James F. Byrnes (D)	
South Carolina (Class 2)	Roger C. Peace (D)	August 5, 1941	November 4, 1941	91 days	Did not seek election.	–	Burnet R. Maybank (D)	Alva M. Lumpkin (D) (Note: The Senate seat was first vacated by James F. Byrnes. Roger C. Peace was appointed to the seat after the previous interim appointee, Alva M. Lumpkin, died.)	
Colorado (Class 3)	Eugene Millikin (R)	December 20, 1941	January 3, 1945	3 years, 14 days	Elected in the 1942 special election.	1942 (Special); 1944; 1950	Ralph Lawrence Carr (R)	Alva B. Adams (D)	
New Jersey (Class 1)	Arthur Walsh (D)	November 26, 1943	December 7, 1944	1 year, 11 days	Did not seek election.	–	Charles Edison (D)	W. Warren Barbour (R)	
Indiana (Class 3)	Samuel D. Jackson (D)	January 28, 1944	November 13, 1944	290 days	Did not seek election to the next term.	–	Henry F. Schricker (D)	Frederick Van Nuys (D)	
Massachusetts (Class 2)	Sinclair Weeks (R)	February 8, 1944	December 19, 1944	315 days	Did not seek election.	–	Leverett Saltonstall (R)	Henry Cabot Lodge Jr. (R)	
Oregon (Class 2)	Guy Cordon (R)	March 4, 1944	January 3, 1949	4 years, 305 days	Elected in the 1944 special election.	1944 (Special); 1948	Earl Snell (R)	Charles L. McNary (R)	
South Carolina (Class 3)	Wilton E. Hall (D)	November 20, 1944	January 3, 1945	44 days	Did not seek election to the next term.	–	Olin D. Johnston (D)	Ellison D. Smith (D)	
Washington (Class 1)	Hugh Mitchell (D)	January 10, 1945	December 25, 1946	1 year, 349 days	Defeated in the 1946 election.	–	Monrad Wallgren (D)	Monrad Wallgren (D)	
Missouri (Class 1)	Frank P. Briggs (D)	January 18, 1945	January 3, 1947	1 year, 350 days	Defeated in the 1946 election.	–	Phil M. Donnelly (D)	Harry S. Truman (D)	
Connecticut (Class 1)	Thomas C. Hart (R)	February 15, 1945	November 5, 1946	1 year, 263 days	Did not seek election to the next term.	–	Raymond E. Baldwin (R)	Francis T. Maloney (D)	
North Dakota (Class 3)	Milton Young (R)	March 12, 1945	January 3, 1951	5 years, 297 days	Elected in the 1946 special election.	1946 (Special); 1950; 1956; 1962; 1968; 1974	Fred G. Aandahl (R)	John Moses (D)	
Nevada (Class 1)	Edward P. Carville (D)	July 25, 1945	January 3, 1947	1 year, 162 days	Lost nomination to run in the 1946 election.	–	Vail M. Pittman (D)	James G. Scrugham (D)	
California (Class 1)	William Knowland (R)	August 26, 1945	January 3, 1947	1 year, 130 days	Elected in the 1946 special election.	1946 (Special); 1946; 1952	Earl Warren (R)	Hiram Johnson (R)	
Ohio (Class 1)	James W. Huffman (D)	October 8, 1945	November 5, 1946	1 year, 28 days	Did not run in the 1946 special election and was defeated in the 1946 election.	–	Frank Lausche (D)	Harold Hitz Burton (R)	
Idaho (Class 2)	Charles C. Gossett (D)	November 17, 1945	November 6, 1946	354 days	Lost nomination to run in the 1946 special election.	–	Arnold Williams (D)	John Thomas (R)	
Kentucky (Class 2)	William A. Stanfill (R)	November 19, 1945	November 5, 1946	351 days	Did not seek election.	–	Simeon Willis (R)	Happy Chandler (D)	
Virginia (Class 2)	Thomas G. Burch (D)	May 31, 1946	November 5, 1946	158 days	Did not seek election.	–	William M. Tuck (D)	Carter Glass (D)	
Alabama (Class 2)	George R. Swift (D)	June 15, 1946	November 5, 1946	143 days	Did not seek election.	–	Chauncey Sparks (D)	John H. Bankhead II (D)	
Florida (Class 1)	Spessard Holland (D)	September 25, 1946	January 3, 1947	100 days	Elected in the 1946 election.	1946; 1952; 1958; 1964	Millard Caldwell (D)	Charles O. Andrews (D)	
Vermont (Class 1)	Ralph Flanders (R)	November 1, 1946	January 3, 1947	63 days	Elected in the 1946 election.	1946; 1952	Mortimer R. Proctor (R)	Warren Austin (R)	
North Carolina (Class 2)	William B. Umstead (D)	December 18, 1946	December 30, 1948	2 years, 12 days	Lost nomination to run in the 1948 special election.	–	R. Gregg Cherry (D)	Josiah Bailey (D)	
Louisiana (Class 3)	William C. Feazel (D)	May 18, 1948	December 30, 1948	226 days	Did not seek election.	–	Earl Long (D)	John H. Overton (D)	
South Dakota (Class 2)	Vera C. Bushfield (R)	October 6, 1948	December 26, 1948	81 days	Did not seek election to the next term.	–	George Theodore Mickelson (R)	Harlan J. Bushfield (R)	
Kentucky (Class 3)	Garrett Withers (D)	January 20, 1949	November 26, 1950	1 year, 310 days	Did not seek election to the next term.	–	Earle Clements (D)	Alben W. Barkley (D)	
North Carolina (Class 2)	Frank Porter Graham (D)	March 29, 1949	November 26, 1950	1 year, 242 days	Lost nomination to run in the 1950 special election.	–	W. Kerr Scott (D)	J. Melville Broughton (D)	
New York (Class 3)	John Foster Dulles (R)	July 7, 1949	November 8, 1949	124 days	Defeated in the 1949 special election.	–	Thomas E. Dewey (R)	Robert F. Wagner (D)	
Rhode Island (Class 1)	Edward L. Leahy (D)	August 24, 1949	December 18, 1950	1 year, 116 days	Did not seek election.	–	John Pastore (D)	J. Howard McGrath (D)	
Idaho (Class 2)	Henry Dworshak (R)	October 14, 1949	January 3, 1955	5 years, 81 days	Elected in the 1950 special election.	1946 (Special); 1950 (Special); 1954; 1960	C. A. Robins (R)	Bert H. Miller (D)	
Kansas (Class 3)	Harry Darby (R)	December 2, 1949	November 28, 1950	361 days	Did not seek election to the next term.	–	Frank Carlson (R)	Clyde M. Reed (R)	
Connecticut (Class 1)	William Benton (D)	December 17, 1949	January 3, 1953	3 years, 17 days	Elected in the 1950 special election.	1950 (Special)	Chester Bowles (D)	Raymond E. Baldwin (R)	
Kentucky (Class 2)	Thomas R. Underwood (D)	March 19, 1951	November 4, 1952	1 year, 230 days	Defeated in the 1952 special election.	–	Lawrence Wetherby (D)	Virgil Chapman (D)	
Michigan (Class 1)	Blair Moody (D)	April 23, 1951	November 4, 1952	1 year, 195 days	Defeated in the 1952 elections.	–	G. Mennen Williams (D)	Arthur Vandenberg (R)	
Nebraska (Class 2)	Fred A. Seaton (R)	December 10, 1951	November 4, 1952	330 days	Did not seek election.	–	Val Peterson (R)	Kenneth S. Wherry (R)	
Connecticut (Class 3)	William A. Purtell (R)	August 29, 1952	November 4, 1952	67 days	Did not run in the 1952 special election but was elected in the 1952 election the same day.	1952	John Davis Lodge (R)	Brien McMahon (D)	
California (Class 3)	Thomas Kuchel (R)	January 2, 1953	January 3, 1957	4 years, 1 day	Elected in the 1954 special election.	1954 (Special); 1956; 1962	Earl Warren (R)	Richard Nixon (R)	
North Carolina (Class 2)	Alton Lennon (D)	July 10, 1953	November 28, 1954	1 year, 141 days	Lost nomination to run in the 1954 elections.	–	William B. Umstead (D)	Willis Smith (D) (Note: The Senate seat was first vacated by J. Melville Broughton. Alton Lennon was appointed to the seat after the previous incumbent, Willis Smith, died.)	
New Hampshire (Class 3)	Robert W. Upton (R)	August 14, 1953	November 7, 1954	1 year, 85 days	Lost nomination to run in the 1954 special election.	–	Hugh Gregg (R)	Charles W. Tobey (R)	
Ohio (Class 3)	Thomas A. Burke (D)	November 10, 1953	December 2, 1954	1 year, 22 days	Defeated in the 1954 special election.	–	Frank Lausche (D)	Robert A. Taft (R)	
Nebraska (Class 2)	Eva Bowring (R)	April 16, 1954	November 7, 1954	205 days	Did not seek election to the next term.	–	Robert B. Crosby (R)	Dwight Griswold (R) (Note: The Senate seat was first vacated by Kenneth S. Wherry. Eva Bowring was appointed to the seat early after the previous incumbent, Dwight Griswold, died.)	
North Carolina (Class 3)	Sam Ervin (D)	June 5, 1954	January 3, 1957	2 years, 212 days	Elected in the 1954 special election.	1954 (Special); 1956; 1962; 1968	William B. Umstead (D)	Clyde R. Hoey (D)	
Wyoming (Class 2)	Edward D. Crippa (R)	June 24, 1954	November 28, 1954	157 days	Did not seek election to the next term.	–	Clifford Joy Rogers (R)	Lester C. Hunt (D)	
Nebraska (Class 1)	Samuel W. Reynolds (R)	July 3, 1954	November 7, 1954	127 days	Did not seek election.	–	Robert B. Crosby (R)	Hugh A. Butler (R)	
South Carolina (Class 2)	Charles E. Daniel (D)	September 6, 1954	December 23, 1954	108 days	Did not seek election to the next term.	–	James F. Byrnes (D)	Burnet R. Maybank (D)	
Nevada (Class 3)	Ernest S. Brown (R)	October 1, 1954	December 1, 1954	61 days	Defeated in the 1954 special election.	–	Charles H. Russell (R)	Pat McCarran (D)	
West Virginia (Class 1)	William Laird III (D)	March 13, 1956	November 6, 1956	238 days	Did not seek election.	–	William C. Marland (D)	Harley M. Kilgore (D)	
South Carolina (Class 2)	Thomas A. Wofford (D)	April 5, 1956	November 6, 1956	215 days	Did not seek election.	–	George Bell Timmerman Jr. (D)	Strom Thurmond (D)	
Kentucky (Class 2)	Robert Humphreys (D)	June 21, 1956	November 6, 1956	138 days	Did not seek election.	–	Happy Chandler (D)	Alben W. Barkley (D)	
Texas (Class 1)	William A. Blakley (D)	January 15, 1957	April 28, 1957	103 days	Did not seek election.	–	Price Daniel (D)	Price Daniel (D)	
West Virginia (Class 2)	John D. Hoblitzell Jr. (R)	January 25, 1958	November 4, 1958	283 days	Defeated in the 1958 special election.	–	Cecil H. Underwood (R)	Matthew M. Neely (D)	
North Carolina (Class 2)	B. Everett Jordan (D)	April 19, 1958	January 3, 1961	2 years, 259 days	Elected in the 1958 special election.	1958 (Special); 1960; 1966	Luther H. Hodges (D)	W. Kerr Scott (D)	
North Dakota (Class 1)	Norman Brunsdale (R)	November 19, 1959	August 7, 1960	262 days	Did not seek election.	–	John E. Davis (R)	William Langer (R)	
Oregon (Class 2)	Hall S. Lusk (D)	March 16, 1960	November 8, 1960	237 days	Did not seek election to the next term.	–	Mark Hatfield (R)	Richard L. Neuberger (D)	
Missouri (Class 3)	Edward V. Long (D)	September 23, 1960	January 3, 1963	2 years, 102 days	Elected in the 1960 special election.	1960 (Special); 1962	James T. Blair Jr. (D)	Thomas C. Hennings Jr. (D)	
Massachusetts (Class 1)	Benjamin A. Smith II (D)	December 27, 1960	November 6, 1962	1 year, 314 days	Did not seek election.	–	Foster Furcolo (D)	John F. Kennedy (D)	
Texas (Class 2)	William A. Blakley (D)	January 3, 1961	June 14, 1961	162 days	Defeated in the 1961 special election.	–	Price Daniel (D)	Lyndon B. Johnson (D)	
Wyoming (Class 2)	Joe Hickey (D)	January 3, 1961	November 6, 1962	1 year, 307 days	Defeated in the 1962 special election.	–	Jack R. Gage (D)	Keith Thomson (R)	
New Hampshire (Class 2)	Maurice J. Murphy Jr. (R)	December 7, 1961	November 6, 1962	334 days	Lost nomination to run in the 1962 special election.	–	Wesley Powell (R)	Styles Bridges (R)	
Kansas (Class 2)	James B. Pearson (R)	January 31, 1962	January 3, 1967	4 years, 337 days	Elected in the 1962 special election.	1962 (Special); 1966; 1972	John Anderson Jr. (R)	Andrew Frank Schoeppel (R)	
South Dakota (Class 3)	Joseph H. Bottum (R)	July 9, 1962	January 3, 1963	178 days	Defeated in the 1962 election.	–	Archie M. Gubbrud (R)	Francis H. Case (R)	
Idaho (Class 2)	Len Jordan (R)	August 6, 1962	January 3, 1967	4 years, 150 days	Elected in the 1962 special election.	1962 (Special); 1966	Robert E. Smylie (R)	Henry Dworshak (R)	
New Mexico (Class 1)	Edwin L. Mechem (R)	November 30, 1962	November 3, 1964	1 year, 339 days	Defeated in the 1964 elections.	–	Tom Bolack (R)	Dennis Chávez (D)	
Oklahoma (Class 2)	J. Howard Edmondson (D)	January 7, 1963	November 3, 1964	1 year, 301 days	Lost nomination to run in the 1964 special election.	–	George Nigh (D)	Robert S. Kerr (D)	
Tennessee (Class 2)	Herbert S. Walters (D)	August 20, 1963	November 3, 1964	1 year, 75 days	Did not seek election.	–	Frank G. Clement (D)	Estes Kefauver (D)	
California (Class 1)	Pierre Salinger (D)	August 4, 1964	December 31, 1964	149 days	Defeated in the 1964 election.	–	Pat Brown (D)	Clair Engle (D)	
Minnesota (Class 2)	Walter Mondale (DFL)	December 30, 1964	December 30, 1966	2 years, 0 days	Elected in the 1966 election.	1966; 1972	Karl Rolvaag (DFL)	Hubert Humphrey (DFL)	
South Carolina (Class 3)	Donald S. Russell (D)	April 22, 1965	November 8, 1966	1 year, 200 days	Lost nomination to run in the 1966 special election.	–	Robert Evander McNair (D)	Olin D. Johnston (D)	
Virginia (Class 1)	Harry F. Byrd Jr. (D)	November 12, 1965	January 3, 1971	5 years, 52 days	Elected in the 1966 special election.	1966 (Special); 1970; 1976	Albertis Harrison (D)	Harry F. Byrd (D)	
Michigan (Class 2)	Robert P. Griffin (R)	May 11, 1966	January 3, 1967	237 days	Elected in the 1966 elections.	1966; 1972	George W. Romney (R)	Patrick V. McNamara (D)	
New York (Class 1)	Charles Goodell (R)	September 10, 1968	January 3, 1971	2 years, 115 days	Defeated in the 1970 election.	–	Nelson Rockefeller (R)	Robert F. Kennedy (D)	
Alaska (Class 2)	Ted Stevens (R)	December 24, 1968	January 3, 1973	4 years, 10 days	Elected in the 1970 special election.	1970 (Special); 1972; 1978; 1984; 1990; 1996; 2002	Wally Hickel (R)	Bob Bartlett (D)	
Illinois (Class 3)	Ralph T. Smith (R)	September 17, 1969	November 16, 1970	1 year, 60 days	Defeated in the 1970 special election.	–	Richard B. Ogilvie (R)	Everett Dirksen (R)	
Georgia (Class 2)	David H. Gambrell (D)	February 1, 1971	November 7, 1972	1 year, 280 days	Lost nomination to run in the 1972 elections.	–	Jimmy Carter (D)	Richard Russell Jr. (D)	
Vermont (Class 1)	Robert Stafford (R)	September 16, 1971	January 3, 1977	5 years, 109 days	Elected in the 1972 special election.	1972 (Special); 1976; 1982	Deane C. Davis (R)	Winston L. Prouty (R)	
Louisiana (Class 2)	Elaine Edwards (D)	August 1, 1972	November 13, 1972	104 days	Did not seek election to the next term.	–	Edwin Edwards (D)	Allen J. Ellender (D)	
Ohio (Class 3)	Howard Metzenbaum (D)	January 4, 1974	December 23, 1974	353 days	Lost nomination to run in the 1974 election.	1976; 1982; 1988	John J. Gilligan (D)	William B. Saxbe (R)	
New Hampshire (Class 3)	Louis C. Wyman (R)	December 31, 1974	January 3, 1975	3 days	Term annulled at the start of the 94th Congress. Later subsequently defeated in the 1975 special election.	–	Meldrim Thomson Jr. (R)	Norris Cotton (R)	
New Hampshire (Class 3)	Norris Cotton (R)	August 8, 1975	September 18, 1975	41 days	Did not seek election.	1954 (Special); 1956; 1962; 1968	Meldrim Thomson Jr. (R)	None (Note: The 1974 election result was contested. Eventually, the Senate declared the seat vacant. Norris Cotton, who had retired at the election, was subsequently appointed to the seat until a special election could be held.)	
Minnesota (Class 2)	Wendell R. Anderson (DFL)	December 30, 1976	December 29, 1978	1 year, 364 days	Defeated in the 1978 election.	–	Rudy Perpich (DFL)	Walter Mondale (DFL)	
Arkansas (Class 2)	Kaneaster Hodges Jr. (D)	December 10, 1977	January 3, 1979	1 year, 24 days	Did not seek election to the next term.	–	David Pryor (D)	John L. McClellan (D)	
Montana (Class 2)	Paul G. Hatfield (D)	January 22, 1978	December 14, 1978	326 days	Lost nomination to run in the 1978 election.	–	Thomas Lee Judge (D)	Lee Metcalf (D)	
Minnesota (Class 1)	Muriel Humphrey (DFL)	January 25, 1978	November 7, 1978	286 days	Did not seek election.	–	Rudy Perpich (DFL)	Hubert Humphrey (DFL)	
Alabama (Class 3)	Maryon Pittman Allen (D)	June 8, 1978	November 7, 1978	152 days	Lost nomination to run in the 1978 special election.	–	George Wallace (D)	James Allen (D)	
Maine (Class 1)	George J. Mitchell (D)	May 17, 1980	January 3, 1983	2 years, 231 days	Elected in the 1982 election.	1982; 1988	Joseph E. Brennan (D)	Edmund Muskie (D)	
New Jersey (Class 1)	Nicholas F. Brady (R)	April 12, 1982	December 27, 1982	259 days	Did not seek election to the next term.	–	Thomas Kean (R)	Harrison A. Williams (D)	
Washington (Class 1)	Daniel J. Evans (R)	September 8, 1983	January 3, 1989	5 years, 117 days	Elected in the 1983 special election.	1983 (Special)	John Spellman (R)	Henry M. Jackson (D)	
North Carolina (Class 3)	Jim Broyhill (R)	July 14, 1986	November 4, 1986	113 days	Defeated in the 1986 elections.	–	James G. Martin (R)	John P. East (R)	
Nebraska (Class 1)	David Karnes (R)	March 11, 1987	January 3, 1989	1 year, 298 days	Defeated in the 1988 election.	–	Kay A. Orr (R)	Edward Zorinsky (D)	
Indiana (Class 3)	Dan Coats (R)	January 3, 1989	January 3, 1993	4 years, 0 days	Elected in the 1990 special election.	1990 (Special); 1992; 2010	Robert D. Orr (R)	Dan Quayle (R)	
Hawaii (Class 1)	Daniel Akaka (D)	May 16, 1990	January 3, 1995	4 years, 232 days	Elected in the 1990 special election.	1990 (Special); 1994; 2000; 2006	John D. Waiheʻe III (D)	Spark Matsunaga (D)	
California (Class 1)	John Seymour (R)	January 7, 1991	November 10, 1992	1 year, 308 days	Defeated in the 1992 special election.	–	Pete Wilson (R)	Pete Wilson (R)	
Pennsylvania (Class 1)	Harris Wofford (D)	May 8, 1991	January 3, 1995	3 years, 240 days	Elected in the 1991 special election.	1991 (Special)	Bob Casey Sr. (D)	John Heinz (R)	
North Dakota (Class 1)	Jocelyn Burdick (D-NPL)	September 12, 1992	December 14, 1992	93 days	Did not seek election.	–	George A. Sinner (D-NPL)	Quentin Burdick (D-NPL)	
Tennessee (Class 2)	Harlan Mathews (D)	January 2, 1993	December 1, 1994	1 year, 333 days	Did not seek election.	–	Ned McWherter (D)	Al Gore (D)	
Texas (Class 1)	Bob Krueger (D)	January 21, 1993	June 14, 1993	144 days	Defeated in the 1993 special election.	–	Ann Richards (D)	Lloyd Bentsen (D)	
Kansas (Class 3)	Sheila Frahm (R)	June 11, 1996	November 5, 1996	147 days	Lost nomination to run in the 1996 special election.	–	Bill Graves (R)	Bob Dole (R)	
Rhode Island (Class 1)	Lincoln Chafee (R)	November 2, 1999	January 3, 2001	1 year, 62 days	Elected in the 2000 election.	2000	Lincoln Almond (R)	John Chafee (R)	
Georgia (Class 3)	Zell Miller (D)	July 24, 2000	January 3, 2005	4 years, 163 days	Elected in the 2000 special election.	2000 (Special)	Roy Barnes (D)	Paul Coverdell (R)	
Missouri (Class 1)	Jean Carnahan (D)	January 3, 2001	November 25, 2002	1 year, 326 days	Defeated in the 2002 special election.	–	Roger B. Wilson (D)	Mel Carnahan (D)	
Minnesota (Class 2)	Dean Barkley (IPM)	November 4, 2002	January 3, 2003	60 days	Did not seek election to the next term.	–	Jesse Ventura (IPM)	Paul Wellstone (DFL)	
Alaska (Class 3)	Lisa Murkowski (R)	December 20, 2002	January 3, 2005	2 years, 14 days	Elected in the 2004 election.	2004; 2010; 2016; 2022	Frank Murkowski (R)	Frank Murkowski (R)	
New Jersey (Class 1)	Bob Menendez (D)	January 17, 2006	January 3, 2007	351 days	Elected in the 2006 election.	2006; 2012; 2018	Jon Corzine (D)	Jon Corzine (D)	
Wyoming (Class 1)	John Barrasso (R)	June 22, 2007	January 3, 2013	5 years, 195 days	Elected in the 2008 special election.	2008 (Special); 2012; 2018; 2024	Dave Freudenthal (D)	Craig L. Thomas (R)	
Mississippi (Class 1)	Roger Wicker (R)	December 31, 2007	January 3, 2013	5 years, 3 days	Elected in the 2008 special election.	2008 (Special); 2012; 2018; 2024	Haley Barbour (R)	Trent Lott (R)	
Illinois (Class 3)	Roland Burris (D)	January 12, 2009	November 29, 2010	1 year, 321 days	Did not seek election to the next term.	–	Rod Blagojevich (D)	Barack Obama (D)	
Delaware (Class 2)	Ted Kaufman (D)	January 15, 2009	November 15, 2010	1 year, 304 days	Did not seek election.	–	Ruth Ann Minner (D)	Joe Biden (D)	
Colorado (Class 3)	Michael Bennet (D)	January 21, 2009	January 3, 2011	1 year, 347 days	Elected in the 2010 election.	2010; 2016; 2022	Bill Ritter (D)	Ken Salazar (D)	
New York (Class 1)	Kirsten Gillibrand (D)	January 26, 2009	January 3, 2013	3 years, 343 days	Elected in the 2010 special election.	2010 (Special); 2012; 2018; 2024	David Paterson (D)	Hillary Clinton (D)	
Florida (Class 3)	George LeMieux (R)	September 9, 2009	January 3, 2011	1 year, 116 days	Did not seek election to the next term.	–	Charlie Crist (R)	Mel Martínez (R)	
Massachusetts (Class 1)	Paul G. Kirk (D)	September 24, 2009	February 4, 2010	133 days	Did not seek election.	–	Deval Patrick (D)	Ted Kennedy (D)	
West Virginia (Class 1)	Carte Goodwin (D)	July 16, 2010	November 15, 2010	122 days	Did not seek election.	–	Joe Manchin (D)	Robert Byrd (D)	
Nevada (Class 1)	Dean Heller (R)	May 9, 2011	January 3, 2013	1 year, 239 days	Elected in the 2012 election.	2012	Brian Sandoval (R)	John Ensign (R)	
Hawaii (Class 3)	Brian Schatz (D)	December 26, 2012	January 3, 2017	4 years, 8 days	Elected in the 2014 special election.	2014 (Special); 2016; 2022	Neil Abercrombie (D)	Daniel Inouye (D)	
South Carolina (Class 3)	Tim Scott (R)	January 2, 2013	January 3, 2017	4 years, 1 day	Elected in the 2014 special election.	2014 (Special); 2016; 2022	Nikki Haley (R)	Jim DeMint (R)	
Massachusetts (Class 2)	Mo Cowan (D)	February 1, 2013	July 15, 2013	164 days	Did not seek election.	–	Deval Patrick (D)	John Kerry (D)	
New Jersey (Class 2)	Jeffrey Chiesa (R)	June 6, 2013	October 30, 2013	146 days	Did not seek election.	–	Chris Christie (R)	Frank Lautenberg (D)	
Montana (Class 2)	John Walsh (D)	February 9, 2014	January 3, 2015	328 days	Was originally to run in the 2014 election but withdrew.	–	Steve Bullock (D)	Max Baucus (D)	
Alabama (Class 2)	Luther Strange (R)	February 9, 2017	January 3, 2018	328 days	Lost nomination to run in the 2017 special election.	–	Robert J. Bentley (R)	Jeff Sessions (R)	
Minnesota (Class 2)	Tina Smith (DFL)	January 3, 2018	January 3, 2021	3 years, 0 days	Elected in the 2018 special election.	2018 (Special); 2020	Mark Dayton (DFL)	Al Franken (DFL)	
Mississippi (Class 2)	Cindy Hyde-Smith (R)	April 2, 2018	January 3, 2021	2 years, 276 days	Elected in the 2018 special election.	2018 (Special); 2020	Phil Bryant (R)	Thad Cochran (R)	
Arizona (Class 3)	Jon Kyl (R)	September 4, 2018	December 31, 2018	118 days	Did not seek election.	1994; 2000; 2006	Doug Ducey (R)	John McCain (R)	
Arizona (Class 3)	Martha McSally (R)	January 3, 2019	December 2, 2020	1 year, 334 days	Defeated in the 2020 special election.	–	Doug Ducey (R)	Jon Kyl (R) (Note: The Senate seat was first vacated by John McCain. Martha McSally was appointed to the seat after the previous interim appointee, Jon Kyl, resigned.)	
Georgia (Class 3)	Kelly Loeffler (R)	January 6, 2020	January 20, 2021	1 year, 14 days	Defeated in the 2020–21 special election.	–	Brian Kemp (R)	Johnny Isakson (R)	
California (Class 3)	Alex Padilla (D)	January 20, 2021	January 3, 2023	1 year, 348 days	Elected in the 2022 elections.	2022	Gavin Newsom (D)	Kamala Harris (D)	
Nebraska (Class 2)	Pete Ricketts (R)	January 23, 2023	Incumbent	–	Elected in the 2024 special election.	2024 (Special); 2026	Jim Pillen (R)	Ben Sasse (R)	
California (Class 1)	Laphonza Butler (D)	October 1, 2023	December 8, 2024	1 year, 68 days	Did not seek election to the next term.	–	Gavin Newsom (D)	Dianne Feinstein (D)	
New Jersey (Class 1)	George Helmy (D)	August 23, 2024	December 8, 2024	107 days	Did not seek election to the next term.	–	Phil Murphy (D)	Bob Menendez (D)	
Ohio (Class 3)	Jon Husted (R)	January 21, 2025	Incumbent	–	Defeated in the 2026 special election.	–	Mike DeWine (R)	JD Vance (R)	
Florida (Class 3)	Ashley Moody (R)	January 21, 2025	Incumbent	–	Elected in the 2026 special election.	2026 (Special)	Ron DeSantis (R)	Marco Rubio (R)	
Oklahoma (Class 2)	Alan Armstrong (R)	March 24, 2026	Incumbent	–	Ineligible to seek election to the next term.	–	Kevin Stitt (R)	Markwayne Mullin (R) (Note: The Senate seat was first vacated by Jim Inhofe, who resigned due to health concerns. Markwayne Mullin was elected in the 2022 special election to continue the remaining years of Inhofe's six-year term.)	
South Carolina (Class 2)	Darline Graham (R)	July 14, 2026	Incumbent	–	Defeated in the 2026 election.	–	Henry McMaster (R)	Lindsey Graham (R)	
Minnesota (Class 1)	TBA (DFL)	–	Appointee	–	May run in the 2027 special election.	–	Tim Walz or Amy Klobuchar (DFL)	Amy Klobuchar (DFL)	
Tennessee (Class 1)	TBA (R)	–	Appointee	–	May run in the 2028 special election.	–	Bill Lee or Marsha Blackburn (R)	Marsha Blackburn (R)	
State (Class)	Appointee	Term started	Term ended	Tenure	Immediate election following appointment	Elections won	Appointed by	Original senator	Ref.
State (Class)	Appointee	Tenure of appointee serving within the unexpired term			Electoral history		Appointed by	Original senator	Ref.

== List of senators-elect appointed to the Senate ==
The following is a list of senators-elect appointed to the Senate after being elected. Only appointments made after the ratification of the Seventeenth Amendment, which established the direct election of senators, are included.

Key

Democratic Party	Republican Party	North Dakota Nonpartisan League	Minnesota Farmer–Labor Party	Minnesota Democratic–Farmer–Labor Party	North Dakota Democratic–Nonpartisan League Party	Independence Party of Minnesota

Currently serving

State (Class)	Senator-elect	Tenure of appointee serving within the unexpired term			Electoral history of appointee		Appointed by	Original senator	Ref.
State (Class)	Senator-elect	Term start	Term end	Tenure	Immediate election preceding appointment	Elections won	Appointed by	Original senator	Ref.
Oregon (Class 2)	Charles L. McNary (R)	December 18, 1918	March 4, 1919	76 days	Elected in the 1918 election.	1918; 1924; 1930; 1936; 1942	James Withycombe (R)	Frederick W. Mulkey (R)	
Ohio (Class 3)	Frank B. Willis (R)	January 14, 1921	March 4, 1921	49 days	Elected in the 1920 election.	1920; 1926	Harry L. Davis (R)	Warren G. Harding (R)	
Idaho (Class 3)	Frank R. Gooding (R)	January 15, 1921	March 4, 1921	48 days	Elected in the 1920 election.	1920; 1926	D. W. Davis (R)	John F. Nugent (D)	
Illinois (Class 2)	Charles S. Deneen (R)	February 26, 1925	March 4, 1925	6 days	Elected in the 1924 election.	1924	Len Small (R)	Joseph M. McCormick (R)	
Missouri (Class 3)	Bennett Champ Clark (D)	February 4, 1933	March 4, 1933	28 days	Elected in the 1932 election.	1932; 1938	Guy Brasfield Park (D)	Harry B. Hawes (D)	
Michigan (Class 2)	Prentiss M. Brown (D)	November 19, 1936	January 3, 1937	45 days	Elected in the 1936 election.	1936	Frank Fitzgerald (R)	James J. Couzens (R)	
Washington (Class 1)	Monrad Wallgren (D)	December 19, 1940	January 3, 1941	15 days	Elected in the 1940 election.	1940	Clarence D. Martin (D)	Lewis B. Schwellenbach (D)	
Washington (Class 3)	Warren Magnuson (D)	December 14, 1944	January 3, 1945	20 days	Elected in the 1944 election.	1944; 1950; 1956; 1962; 1968; 1974	Arthur B. Langlie (R)	Homer Bone (D)	
Washington (Class 1)	Harry P. Cain (R)	December 26, 1946	January 3, 1947	8 days	Elected in the 1946 election.	1946	Monrad Wallgren (D)	Hugh Mitchell (D) (Note: The Senate seat was first vacated by Monrad Wallgren. Harry P. Cain was appointed to the seat early after the previous interim appointee, Hugh Mitchell, lost election to a full term.)	
South Dakota (Class 2)	Karl E. Mundt (R)	December 31, 1948	January 3, 1949	3 days	Elected in the 1948 election.	1948; 1954; 1960; 1966	George Theodore Mickelson (R)	Vera C. Bushfield (R)	
California (Class 3)	Richard Nixon (R)	December 1, 1950	January 3, 1951	33 days	Elected in the 1950 election.	1950	Earl Warren (R)	Sheridan Downey (D)	
South Carolina (Class 2)	Strom Thurmond (D)	December 24, 1954	January 3, 1955	10 days	Elected in the 1954 election.	1954 (Write-in) (Note: Senator Strom Thurmond was originally elected as a Democrat in 1954, but as a write-in candidate, then resigned, and then won a special election in 1956 and 1960 before switching to become a Republican in 1964. Thurmond won re-election as a Republican in 1966, 1972, 1978, 1984, 1990, and 1996.); 1956 (Special); 1960; 1966; 1972; 1978; 1984; 1990; 1996	James F. Byrnes (D)	Charles E. Daniel (D) (Note: The Senate seat was first vacated by Burnet R. Maybank. Strom Thurmond was appointed to the seat early after the previous interim appointee, Charles E. Daniel, resigned.)	
Nebraska (Class 2)	Carl Curtis (R)	January 1, 1955	January 3, 1955	2 days	Elected in the 1954 regular election.	1954; 1960; 1966; 1972	Robert B. Crosby (R)	Hazel Abel (R) (Note: The Senate seat was first vacated by Dwight Griswold, in which it was originally vacated by Kenneth S. Wherry. Carl Curtis was appointed to the seat early after the previous interim appointee, Eva Bowring, retired.)	
California (Class 1)	George Murphy (R)	January 1, 1965	January 3, 1965	2 days	Elected in the 1964 election.	1964	Pat Brown (D)	Pierre Salinger (D) (Note: The Senate seat was first vacated by Clair Engle. George Murphy was appointed to the seat early after the previous interim appointee, Pierre Salinger, lost election to a full term.)	
Virginia (Class 2)	William B. Spong Jr. (D)	December 31, 1966	January 3, 1967	3 days	Elected in the 1966 election.	1966	Mills Godwin (D)	Absalom Willis Robertson (D)	
Kentucky (Class 3)	Marlow Cook (R)	December 17, 1968	January 3, 1969	17 days	Elected in the 1968 election.	1968	Louie Nunn (R)	Thruston Ballard Morton (R)	
Missouri (Class 3)	Thomas Eagleton (D)	December 28, 1968	January 3, 1969	6 days	Elected in the 1968 election.	1968; 1974; 1980	Warren E. Hearnes (D)	Edward V. Long (D)	
Delaware (Class 1)	William Roth (R)	January 1, 1971	January 3, 1971	2 days	Elected in the 1970 election.	1970; 1976; 1982; 1988; 1994	Russell W. Peterson (R)	John J. Williams (R)	
California (Class 1)	John V. Tunney (D)	January 2, 1971	January 3, 1971	1 day	Elected in the 1970 election.	1970	Ronald Reagan (R)	George Murphy (R)	
Louisiana (Class 2)	J. Bennett Johnston (D)	November 14, 1972	January 3, 1973	50 days	Elected in the 1972 election.	1972; 1978; 1984; 1990	Edwin Edwards (D)	Elaine Edwards (D) (Note: The Senate seat was first vacated by Allen J. Ellender. J. Bennett Johnston was appointed to the seat early after the previous interim appointee, Elaine Edwards, retired.)	
Nevada (Class 3)	Paul Laxalt (R)	December 18, 1974	January 3, 1975	16 days	Elected in the 1974 election.	1974; 1980	Mike O'Callaghan (D)	Alan Bible (D)	
Utah (Class 3)	Jake Garn (R)	December 21, 1974	January 3, 1975	13 days	Elected in the 1974 election.	1974; 1980; 1986	Cal Rampton (D)	Wallace F. Bennett (R)	
Ohio (Class 3)	John Glenn (D)	December 24, 1974	January 3, 1975	10 days	Elected in the 1974 election.	1974; 1980; 1986; 1992	John J. Gilligan (D)	Howard Metzenbaum (D) (Note: The Senate seat was first vacated by William B. Saxbe. John Glenn was appointed to the seat early after the previous interim appointee, Howard Metzenbaum, lost nomination for a full term.)	
Kentucky (Class 3)	Wendell Ford (D)	December 28, 1974	January 3, 1975	6 days	Elected in the 1974 election.	1974; 1980; 1986; 1992	Julian Carroll (D)	Marlow Cook (R)	
Florida (Class 3)	Richard Stone (D)	January 1, 1975	January 3, 1975	2 days	Elected in the 1974 election.	1974	Reubin Askew (D)	Edward Gurney (R)	
Michigan (Class 1)	Donald Riegle (D)	December 30, 1976	January 3, 1977	4 days	Elected in the 1976 election.	1976; 1982; 1988	William Milliken (R)	Philip Hart (D)	
Missouri (Class 1)	John Danforth (R)	December 27, 1976	January 3, 1977	7 days	Elected in the 1976 election.	1976; 1982; 1988	Kit Bond (R)	Stuart Symington (D)	
Nebraska (Class 1)	Edward Zorinsky (D)	December 28, 1976	January 3, 1977	6 days	Elected in the 1976 election.	1976; 1982	J. James Exon (D)	Roman Hruska (R)	
Rhode Island (Class 1)	John Chafee (R)	December 29, 1976	January 3, 1977	5 days	Elected in the 1976 election.	1976; 1982; 1988; 1994	Philip W. Noel (D)	John Pastore (D)	
Ohio (Class 1)	Howard Metzenbaum (D)	December 29, 1976	January 3, 1977	5 days	Elected in the 1976 election.	1976; 1982; 1988	Jim Rhodes (R)	Robert Taft Jr. (R)	
California (Class 1)	S. I. Hayakawa (R)	January 2, 1977	January 3, 1977	1 day	Elected in the 1976 election.	1976	Jerry Brown (D)	John V. Tunney (D)	
Montana (Class 2)	Max Baucus (D)	December 15, 1978	January 3, 1979	19 days	Elected in the 1978 election.	1978; 1984; 1990; 1996; 2002; 2008	Thomas Lee Judge (D)	Paul G. Hatfield (D) (Note: The Senate seat was first vacated by Lee Metcalf. Max Baucus was appointed to the seat early after the previous interim appointee, Paul G. Hatfield, lost nomination for a full term.)	
Kansas (Class 2)	Nancy Kassebaum (R)	December 23, 1978	January 3, 1979	11 days	Elected in the 1978 election.	1978; 1984; 1990	Robert Frederick Bennett (R)	James B. Pearson (R)	
Mississippi (Class 2)	Thad Cochran (R)	December 27, 1978	January 3, 1979	7 days	Elected in the 1978 election.	1978; 1984; 1990; 1996; 2002; 2008; 2014	Cliff Finch (D)	James Eastland (D)	
Minnesota (Class 2)	Rudy Boschwitz (R)	December 30, 1978	January 3, 1979	4 days	Elected in the 1978 election.	1978; 1984	Rudy Perpich (DFL)	Wendell R. Anderson (DFL) (Note: The Senate seat was first vacated by Walter Mondale. Rudy Boschwitz was appointed to the seat early after the previous interim appointee, Wendell R. Anderson, lost election to a full term.)	
Wyoming (Class 2)	Alan Simpson (R)	January 1, 1979	January 3, 1979	2 days	Elected in the 1978 election.	1978; 1984; 1990	Edgar Herschler (D)	Clifford Hansen (R)	
Virginia (Class 2)	John Warner (R)	January 2, 1979	January 3, 1979	1 day	Elected in the 1978 election.	1978; 1984; 1990; 1996; 2002	John N. Dalton (R)	William L. Scott (R)	
New Hampshire (Class 3)	Warren Rudman (R)	December 30, 1980	January 3, 1981	4 days	Elected in the 1980 election.	1980; 1986	Hugh Gallen (D)	John A. Durkin (D) (Note: The Senate seat was first vacated after the start of the contested term. Warren Rudman was appointed to the seat early after the previous incumbent, John A. Durkin, resigned.)	
Florida (Class 3)	Paula Hawkins (R)	January 1, 1981	January 3, 1981	2 days	Elected in the 1980 election.	1980	Bob Graham (D)	Richard Stone (D)	
Alabama (Class 3)	Jeremiah Denton (R)	January 2, 1981	January 3, 1981	1 day	Elected in the 1980 election.	1980	Fob James (D)	Donald Stewart (D) (Note: The Senate seat was first vacated by James Allen. Jeremiah Denton was appointed to the seat early after the previous incumbent, Donald Stewart, lost renomination to a full term.)	
New Jersey (Class 1)	Frank Lautenberg (D)	December 27, 1982	January 3, 1983	7 days	Elected in the 1982 election.	1982; 1988; 1994; 2002; 2008	Thomas Kean (R)	Nicholas F. Brady (R) (Note: The Senate seat was first vacated by Harrison A. Williams. Frank Lautenberg was appointed to the seat early after the previous interim appointee, Nicholas F. Brady, resigned.)	
Massachusetts (Class 2)	John Kerry (D)	January 2, 1985	January 3, 1985	1 day	Elected in the 1984 election.	1984; 1990; 1996; 2002; 2008	Michael Dukakis (D)	Paul Tsongas (D)	
New Hampshire (Class 2)	Bob Smith (R)	December 7, 1990	January 3, 1991	27 days	Elected in the 1990 election.	1990; 1996	Judd Gregg (R)	Gordon J. Humphrey (R)	
North Dakota (Class 3)	Byron Dorgan (D-NPL)	December 14, 1992	January 3, 1993	20 days	Elected in the 1992 election.	1992; 1998; 2004	George A. Sinner (D-NPL)	Kent Conrad (D-NPL)	
Texas (Class 2)	John Cornyn (R)	December 2, 2002	January 3, 2003	32 days	Elected in the 2002 election.	2002; 2008; 2014; 2020	Rick Perry (R)	Phil Gramm (R)	
New Jersey (Class 1)	Andy Kim (D)	December 8, 2024	January 3, 2025	26 days	Elected in the 2024 election.	2024	Phil Murphy (D)	George Helmy (D) (Note: The Senate seat was first vacated by Bob Menendez. Andy Kim was appointed to the seat early after the previous interim appointee, George Helmy, resigned.)	
California (Class 1)	Adam Schiff (D)	December 8, 2024	January 3, 2025	26 days	Elected in the 2024 elections.	2024	Gavin Newsom (D)	Laphonza Butler (D) (Note: The Senate seat was first vacated by Dianne Feinstein. Adam Schiff was appointed to the seat early after the previous interim appointee, Laphonza Butler, retired.)	
Oklahoma (Class 2)	Kevin Hern (R)	November 30, 2026	January 3, 2027	34 days	Elected in the 2026 election.	2026	Kevin Stitt (R)	Alan Armstrong (R) (Note: The Senate seat was first vacated by Markwayne Mullin, in which it was originally vacated by Jim Inhofe. Kevin Hern will be appointed to the seat early after the previous interim appointee, Alan Armstrong, retiring.)	
State (Class)	Senator-elect	Term start	Term end	Tenure	Immediate election preceding appointment	Elections won	Appointed by	Original senator	Ref.
State (Class)	Senator-elect	Tenure of appointee serving within the unexpired term			Electoral history		Appointed by	Original senator	Ref.

== See also ==
- List of special elections to the United States Senate
