= Clark Kuppinger =

American politician

Member of the Kansas Senate from the 6th district
- In office January 10, 1961 – November 18, 1963
- Preceded by: James B. Pearson

Member of the Kansas House of Representatives from the 10th district
- In office 1951 – January 10, 1961

Personal details
- Born: 1918 Texas
- Died: November 18, 1963
- Party: Republican

Clark Kuppinger (1918–November 18, 1963) was an American politician and attorney who served in the Kansas House of Representatives and Kansas Senate. He spent 5 terms in the Kansas House of Representatives from 1951 to 1960, moving up to the Kansas Senate in 1961; however, he died before completing his first term in the Senate, in 1963.
