= Mortimer Elwyn Cooley =

US Naval officer (1855–1944)

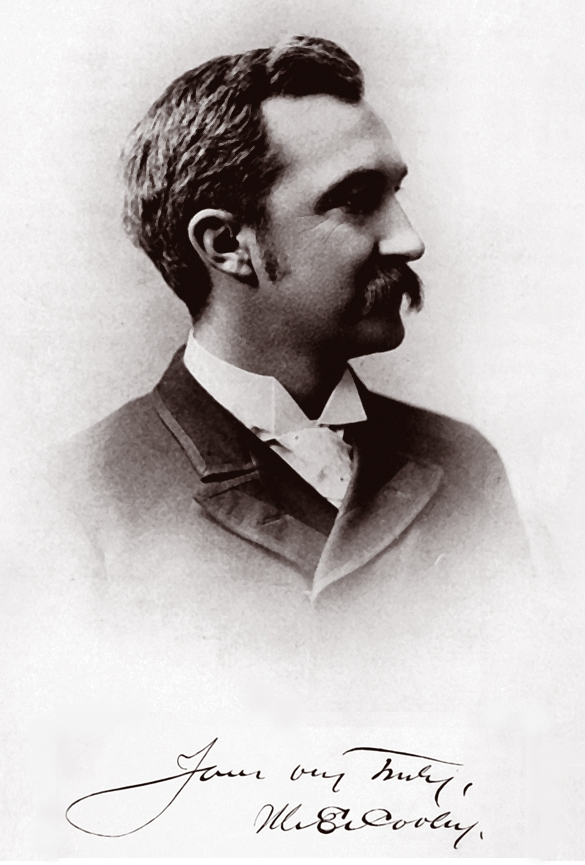
Mortimer Elwyn Cooley

Mortimer Elwyn Cooley (March 28, 1855 – August 25, 1944) was an American mechanical and consulting engineer, US Naval officer, politician, and professor of mechanical engineering at the University of Michigan. He served as the 2nd dean of the University of Michigan College of Engineering from 1903 to 1928 and as the president of the American Society of Mechanical Engineers from 1919 to 1920.

== Early life and education ==
Cooley was born in Canandaigua, New York as the son of Albert Blake Colle and Achsah (Griswold) Coole. After the local district schools and the Canandaigua Academy he attended the Naval Academy in Annapolis, Maryland, now the United States Naval Academy, where he graduated in 1878. At the academy Mortimer served on two practical cruises aboard USS Alert and USS Mayflower.

== Career ==
=== Early career ===
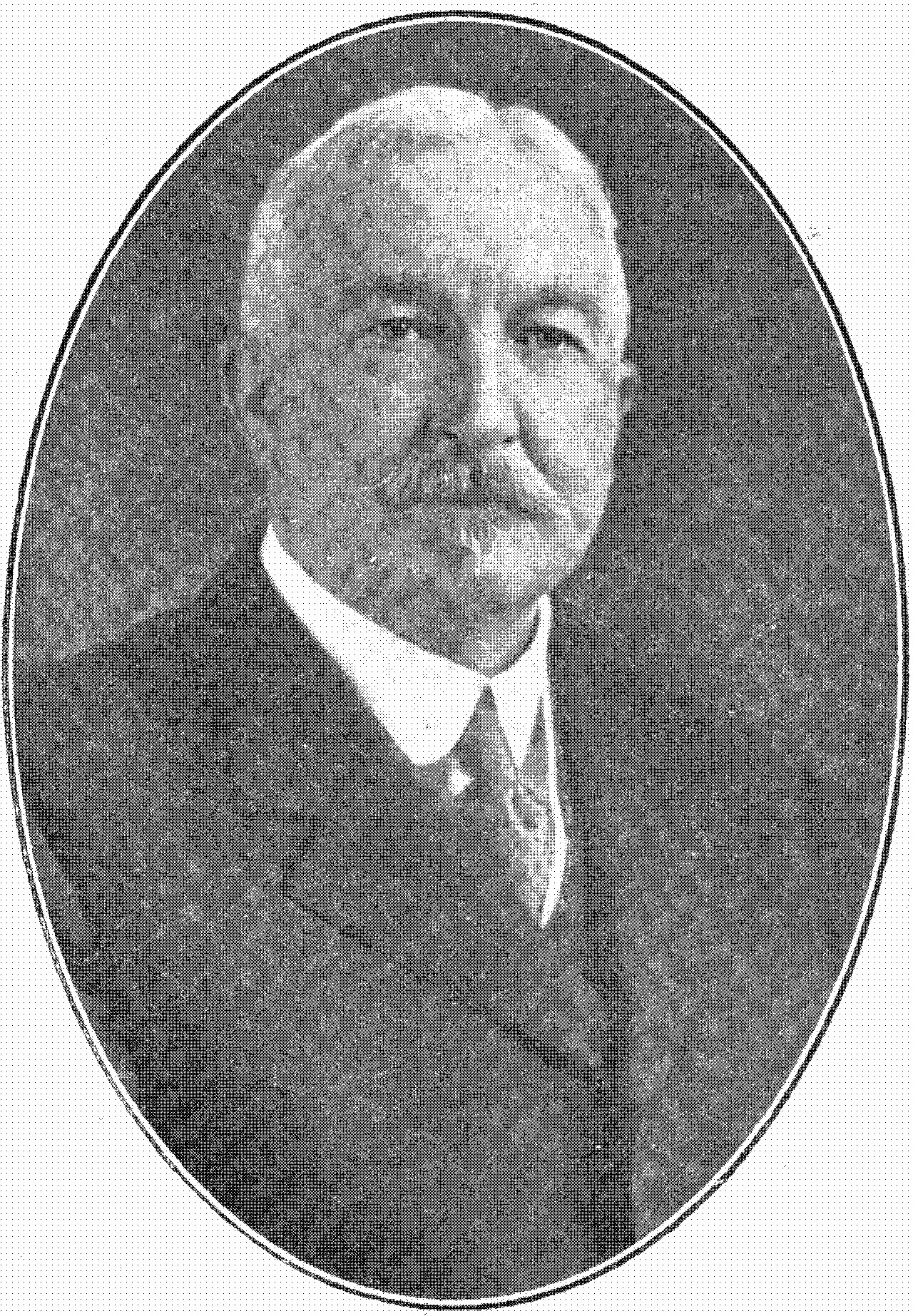
Cooley, mechanical engineer for the USS Yosemite (1892)

After his graduation in 1878 he first served on USS Quinnebaug, cruising the North and Mediterranean seas, together with Ira Nelson Hollis. In the year 1879–1880 he cruised the North Atlantic on the screw gunboat USS Alliance. In 1880–1881 he was assistant at the Bureau of Steam Engineering in the Navy Department, and in 1881 was appointed Professor of Mechanical Engineering at the University of Michigan, lecturing Steam Engineering and Iron Shipbuilding.

=== Later career ===
After his resignation from the Navy in 1885, he continued working as Professor of at the University of Michigan. Since 1904, he was also Dean of its College of Engineering and Architecture at the University of Michigan, until his retirement in 1928. Beside his academic career he also continued to work as mechanical and consulting engineer for various military and civil offices.

Cooley was elected fellow of the American Academy of Arts and Sciences. He served as president of the American Society of Mechanical Engineers in 1919–1920, and also as president of the American Society of Civil Engineers, and the Federated American Engineering Societies, later the American Engineering Council. in 1930, he was awarded the Washington Award.

In 1924, Cooley ran unsuccessfully for a seat in the United States Senate as a Democrat, but lost to incumbent James Couzens.

== Personal life ==
He was married to Carolyn Elizabeth Moseley.

== Selected publications ==
- Cooley, Mortimer E. Annual report[s, and Final report] of the Block Singal and Train Control Board to the Interstate Commerce Commission. Washington, Govt. Print. Off., 1909–12.
- Cooley, Mortimer E. Report on proposed Belle Isle bridge by the Consulting board, Bell Isle bridge division of engineering and construction, Department of public works. Detroit, 1918.
- Cooley, C. M. E., and Mortimer Elwyn. The Cooley genealogy, the descendants of Ensign Benjamin Cooley, an early settler of Springfield and Longmeadow, Massachusetts; and other members of the family in America. Rutland VT, The Tuttle Pub. Co (1940).
- Mortimer E. Cooley & Vivien B. Keatley. Scientific blacksmith, by Mortimer E. Cooley, with the assistance of Vivien B. Keatley. Ann Arbor, Univ. of Michigan Press, 1947.

Party political offices
Preceded by Henry Ford	Democratic nominee for U.S. Senator from Michigan (Class 2); 1924	Succeeded by Prentiss M. Brown
