= 1952 United States Senate election in Washington =

- November 4, 1952
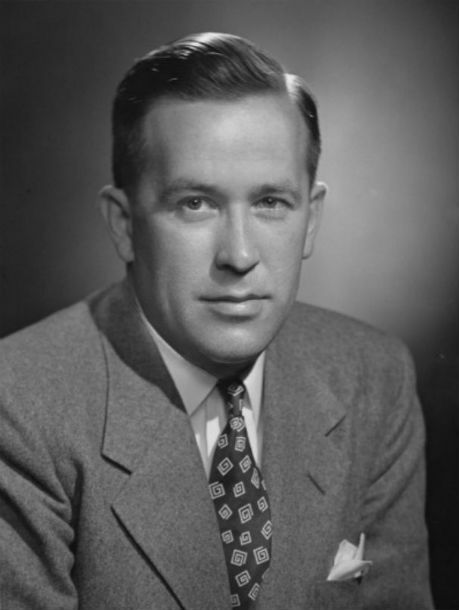

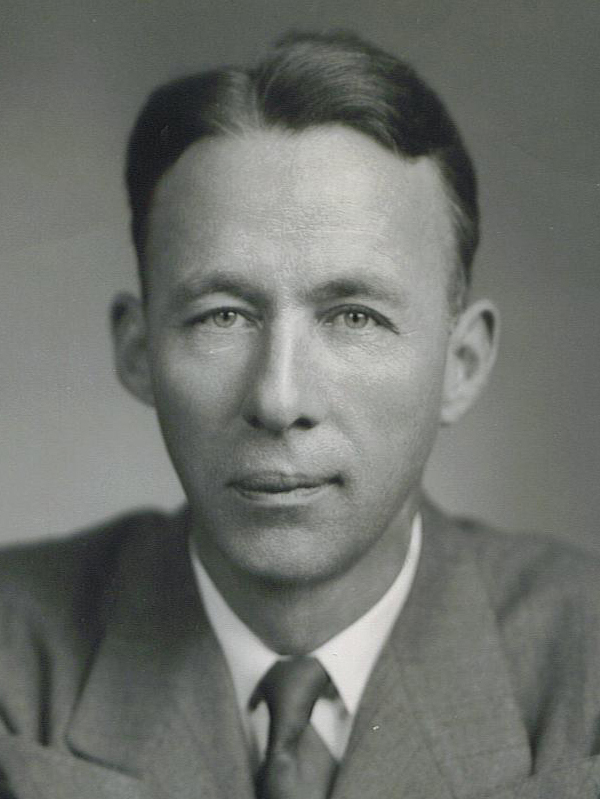
| Nominee | Henry M. Jackson | Harry Cain |
| Party | Democratic | Republican |
| Popular vote | 595,288 | 460,884 |
| Percentage | 56.23% | 43.53% |
- County results Jackson: 50–60% 60–70% Cain: 40–50% 50–60% 60–70%
U.S. senator before election
Harry Cain
Republican
Elected U.S. Senator
Henry M. Jackson
Democratic

The United States Senate election in Washington of 1952 was held on November 4, 1952. Incumbent and highly-controversial Republican Harry Cain ran for a second term in office, but was defeated by Democratic U.S. Representative Henry M. Jackson. Jackson would come to serve 30 years as a United States Senator, and this would be his only election to the Senate in which he lost any of the state's counties.

== Blanket primary ==
=== Candidates ===
==== Democratic ====
- Henry M. Jackson, U.S. Representative from Everett

==== Republican ====
- Harry Cain, incumbent U.S. Senator since 1946
- Carl Viking Holman
- Ed F. Oldfield

=== Results ===
1952 U.S. Senate primary election in Washington
| Party | Candidate | Votes | % |
|---|---|---|---|
| Democratic | Henry M. Jackson | 326,341 | 48.84% |
| Republican | Harry Cain (incumbent) | 261,244 | 39.09% |
| Republican | Carl Viking Holman | 49,411 | 7.39% |
| Republican | Ed F. Oldfield | 31,243 | 4.68% |
| Total votes | | 668,239 | 100.00% |

== General election ==
=== Results ===
1952 U.S. Senate election in Washington
| Party | Candidate | Votes | % | ±% |
|---|---|---|---|---|
| Democratic | Henry M. Jackson | 595,288 | 56.23% | ▲11.09 |
| Republican | Harry Cain (incumbent) | 460,884 | 43.53% | ▼10.81 |
| Progressive | Thomas C. Rabbitt | 1,912 | 0.18% | N/A |
| Socialist Labor | Henry M. Killman | 651 | 0.06% | ▼0.29 |
| Total votes | | 1,058,735 | 100.00% | |
| Democratic gain from Republican | | Swing | | |

== See also ==
- 1952 United States Senate elections
