= 1972 United States Senate election in Kansas =

- November 7, 1972
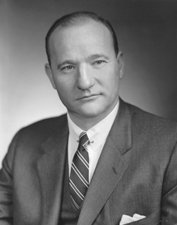

| Nominee | James B. Pearson | Archibald O. Tetzlaff |
| Party | Republican | Democratic |
| Popular vote | 622,591 | 200,764 |
| Percentage | 71.42% | 23.03% |
- County results Pearson: 60–70% 70–80% 80–90%
U.S. senator before election
James B. Pearson
Republican
Elected U.S. Senator
James B. Pearson
Republican

The 1972 United States Senate election in Kansas took place on November 7, 1972, concurrently with the U.S. presidential election, elections to the United States Senate in other states, elections to the United States House of Representatives, and various state and local elections.

Incumbent Republican U.S. Senator James B. Pearson defeated Democratic nominee Arch O. Tetzlaff with 71.42% of the vote.

== Primary elections ==
Primary elections were held on August 1, 1972.

=== Democratic primary ===
==== Candidates ====
- Archibald O. Tetzlaff, anesthesiologist, unsuccessful candidate for Republican nomination for Kansas's 3rd congressional district in 1970

==== Results ====
Democratic primary results
| Party | Candidate | Votes | % |
|---|---|---|---|
| Democratic | Archibald O. Tetzlaff | | unopposed |

=== Republican primary ===
==== Candidates ====
- Harlan D. House, farmer
- James B. Pearson, incumbent U.S. senator

==== Results ====
Republican primary results
| Party | Candidate | Votes | % |
|---|---|---|---|
| Republican | James B. Pearson (incumbent) | 229,908 | 82.19% |
| Republican | Harlan D. House | 49,825 | 17.81% |
| Total votes | | 279,733 | 100.00% |

== General election ==
=== Candidates ===
- Howard Hadin (P), perennial candidate
- Gene F. Miller (C)
- James B. Pearson (R)
- Archibald O. Tetzlaff (D)

=== Results ===
1972 United States Senate election in Kansas
| Party | Candidate | Votes | % |
|---|---|---|---|
| Republican | James B. Pearson (incumbent) | 622,591 | 71.42 |
| Democratic | Archibald O. Tetzlaff | 200,764 | 23.03 |
| Conservative | Gene F. Miller | 35,510 | 4.07 |
| Prohibition | Howard Hadin | 12,857 | 1.48 |
| Majority | | 421,827 | 48.39 |
| Turnout | | 871,722 | |
| Republican hold | | | |

== See also ==
- 1972 United States Senate elections

== Bibliography ==
- Congressional Elections, 1946-1996. Washington, D.C.: Congressional Quarterly Inc. 1998. ISBN 1-56802-248-4.
- Scammon, Richard M., ed. (1973). America Votes 10: a handbook of contemporary American election statistics, 1972. Washington, D.C.: Governmental Affairs Institute.
