= 1920 United States Senate special election in Virginia =

United States Senate special election in Virginia, 1920
- November 2, 1920
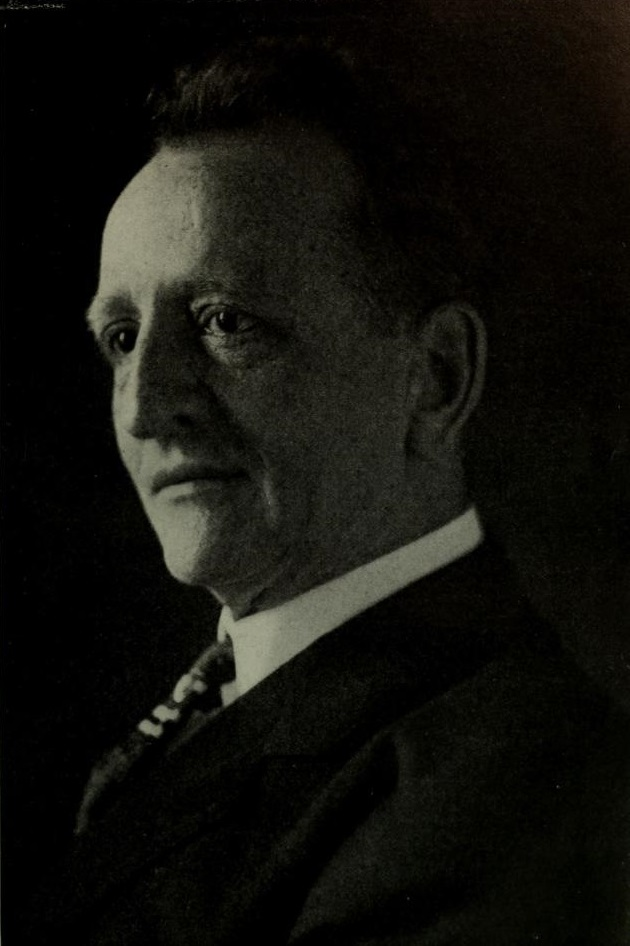

Nominee	Carter Glass	J. R. Pollard
Party	Democratic	Republican
Popular vote	184,646	17,576
Percentage	91.31%	8.69%
U.S. senator before election
Carter Glass
Democratic
Elected U.S. Senator
Carter Glass
Democratic

The 1920 United States Senate special election in Virginia was held on Tuesday November 2. Appointed Senator Carter Glass defeated Republican J. R. Pollard and was elected to finish the term of Democrat Thomas S. Martin, who died the previous year. Glass and fellow Senator Claude A. Swanson were the first U.S. senators to be elected by popular vote (Martin ran unopposed in 1918) following the passage of the Seventeenth Amendment.

== Results ==
United States Senate special election in Virginia, 1920
Party	Candidate	Votes	%	±%
Democratic	Carter Glass (inc.)	184,646	91.31%	
Republican	J. R. Pollard	17,576	8.69%	
Majority		167,070	82.62%	
Turnout		202,222		
Democratic hold				
