= Hugh Mitchell (politician) =

American politician

Hugh Burnton Mitchell
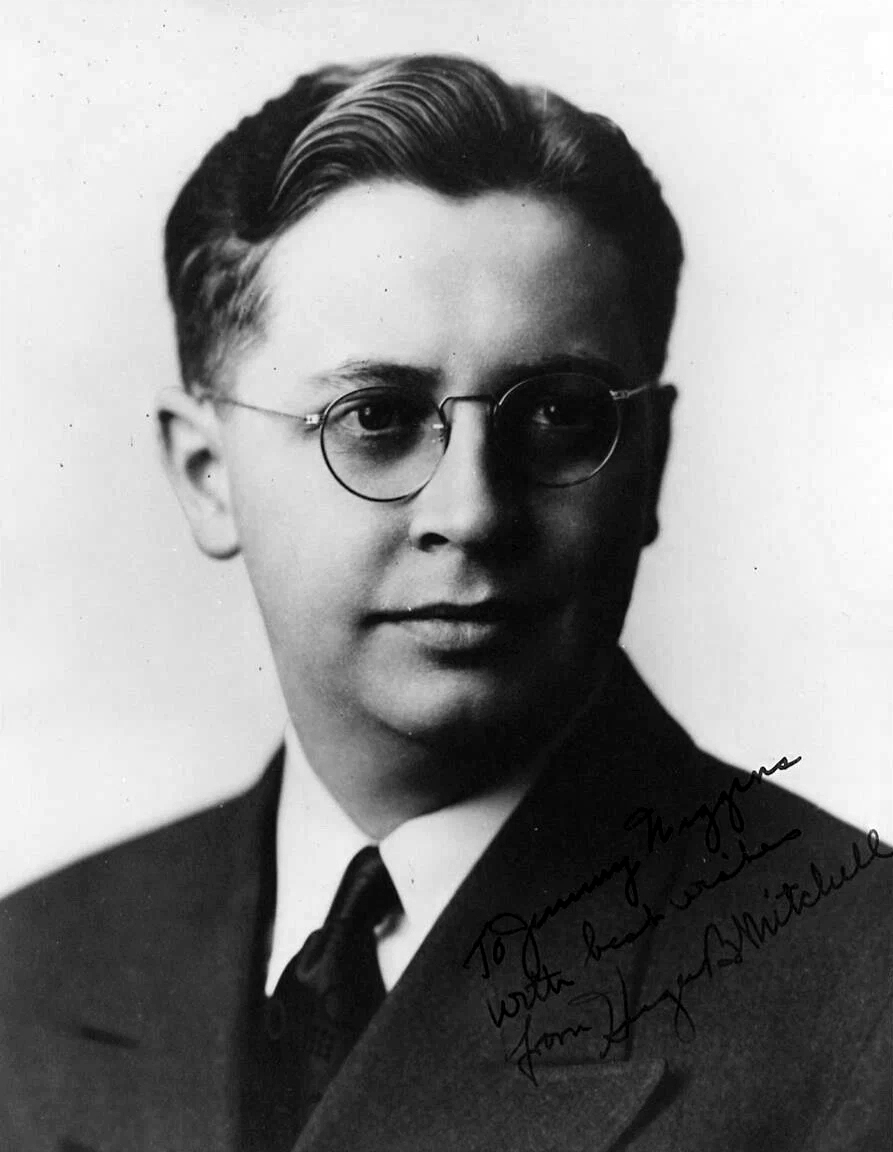

Member of the U.S. House of Representatives from Washington's 1st district
- In office January 3, 1949 – January 3, 1953
- Preceded by: Homer Jones
- Succeeded by: Thomas Pelly

United States Senator from Washington
- In office January 10, 1945 – December 25, 1946
- Appointed by: Monrad Wallgren
- Preceded by: Monrad Wallgren
- Succeeded by: Harry P. Cain

Personal details
- Born: March 22, 1907 Great Falls, Montana, U.S.
- Died: June 10, 1996 (aged 89) Seattle, Washington, U.S.
- Party: Democratic

Hugh Burnton Mitchell (March 22, 1907 – June 10, 1996), was an American politician and journalist who served as a member of the United States Senate from 1944 to 1946 and as a member of the United States House of Representatives from 1949 to 1953. He represented the state of Washington. He left Dartmouth College and the class of 1930 in 1929 when the Great Crash hit. He traveled to Washington State and a job as a sports reporter in 1929, but the political reporter for the Everett News was removed to prevent bias, as she was involved with the Mayor. Mitchell took over the political beat and, assessing the changing political climate, was among the first if not the first in the area to predict Franklin Roosevelt's victory as president in 1932.

Mitchell, a Democrat, was appointed on January 10, 1945, to fill a vacancy in the Senate caused by the resignation of Monrad Wallgren, who Mitchell had been executive assistant to since 1933. He proposed extending the Marshall Plan to Asia, seeing economic and infrastructure development as critical to the development of democracy. This was defeated on budget grounds by Republican adversaries, setting the stage for Truman's dependence on military containment of communist expansion, and the readmission of France to Viet Nam after World War II as a part of containment. He did not win re-election in 1946, and resigned on December 25, 1946, to give his successor seniority in committee assignments important to Washington State.

In 1948, Mitchell won election to the House of Representatives in the First Congressional District. He won his bid for re-election in 1950. He proposed integrated resource planning for the Columbia River Valley, adding fish and watershed management to irrigation and power production. This was defeated by a coalition of industrial and bureaucratic interests, including irrigation and power production private concerns and the Corps of Engineers and the Bureau of Land Management, whose authority and budgets were threatened. In 1952, Mitchell did not run for re-election, instead running for Governor of Washington to pursue state development including Columbia River Valley integrated resource development. He was unsuccessful in that election, as well as in his candidacies for the House of Representatives in 1954 and 1958. He was later appointed by President Carter to the Presidential Commission on Japanese Internment during World War II. This Commission considered that Constitutional guarantees had been violated by internment and recommended reparation to those affected.

Mitchell was known as a reformer while in Congress and helped expose the scandal surrounding the sale of World War II surplus property.

Party political offices
Preceded by Monrad Wallgren	Democratic nominee for U.S. Senator from Washington (Class 1); 1946	Succeeded by Henry M. Jackson
Preceded by Monrad Wallgren	Democratic nominee for Governor of Washington; 1952	Succeeded by Albert Rosellini
U.S. Senate
Preceded by Monrad Wallgren	U.S. senator (Class 1) from Washington; January 10, 1945 – December 25, 1946; Served alongside: Warren Magnuson	Succeeded by Harry P. Cain
U.S. House of Representatives
Preceded by Homer Jones	Member of the U.S. House of Representatives from Washington's 1st congressional district 1949–1953	Succeeded by Thomas Pelly
Honorary titles
Preceded by Joseph H. Ball	Youngest member of the United States Senate; January 18, 1945 – August 26, 1945	Succeeded by William F. Knowland
