= 1933 United States Senate special election in Virginia =

- November 7, 1933
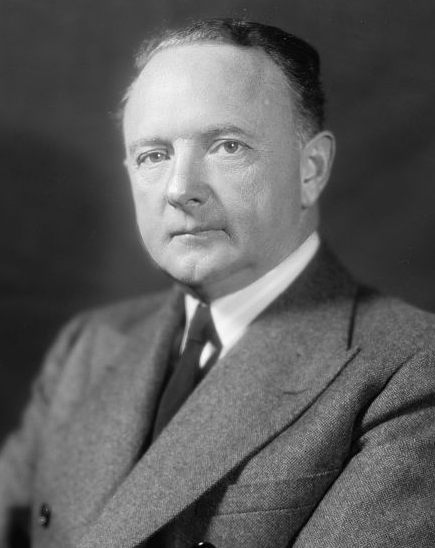

Nominee	Harry F. Byrd, Sr.	Henry A. Wise
Party	Democratic	Republican
Popular vote	119,377	44,648
Percentage	71.31%	26.67%
- County and independent city results Byrd: 50–60% 60–70% 70–80% 80–90% >90% Wise: 50–60%
U.S. senator before election
Harry F. Byrd
Democratic
Elected U.S. Senator
Harry F. Byrd
Democratic

The 1933 United States Senate special election in Virginia was held on November 7, 1933. Byrd had been appointed to fill the vacancy left by Claude A. Swanson after Swanson became the U.S. Secretary of the Navy earlier in the year.

== Results ==
United States Senate special election in Virginia, 1933
Party	Candidate	Votes	%	±%
Democratic	Harry F. Byrd (inc.)	119,377	71.31%	−28.53%
Republican	Henry A. Wise	44,648	26.67%	+26.67%
Independent	John M. Daniel	1,543	0.92%	
Socialist	Elizabeth L. Otey	1,130	0.68%	+0.68%
Prohibition	Hewman H. Raymond	704	0.42%	+0.42%
Majority		74,729	44.64%	−55.04%
Turnout		167,402		
Democratic hold				

== See also ==
- 1933 United States Senate elections
