= 1928 United States Senate elections in Michigan =

1928 United States Senate election in Michigan
- November 6, 1928
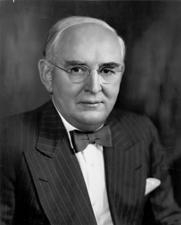

Nominee	Arthur Vandenberg	John W. Bailey
Party	Republican	Democratic
Popular vote	977,893	376,592
Percentage	71.79%	27.65%
- County results Vandenberg: 50–60% 60–70% 70–80% 80–90% >90%
U.S. senator before election
Arthur Vandenberg
Republican
Elected U.S. Senator
Arthur Vandenberg
Republican

The 1928 United States Senate election in Michigan was held on November 6, 1928, alongside a special election to the same seat.

Democratic Senator Woodbridge N. Ferris died in office in March 1928. Governor Fred W. Green appointed newspaper publisher Arthur H. Vandenberg to fill Ferris's seat until a successor could be duly elected. Vandenberg won both the special election to complete Ferris's term and the regularly scheduled 1928 election, both held on November 6.

== General election ==
=== Regular election ===
==== Candidates ====
- John W. Bailey (Democratic)
- David Boyd (Socialist Labor)
- Ben A. Faulkner (Workers)
- William L. Kreighoff (Socialist)
- Duly McCone (Prohibition)
- Arthur H. Vandenberg, interim appointee Senator (Republican)

==== Results ====
1928 U.S. Senate election in Michigan
Party	Candidate	Votes	%
Republican	Arthur H. Vandenberg (incumbent)	977,893	71.79%
Democratic	John W. Bailey	376,592	27.65%
Socialist	William L. Kreighoff	2,796	0.21%
Communist	Ben A. Faulkner	2,249	0.17%
Prohibition	Duly McCone	1,927	0.14%
Socialist Labor	David Boyd	689	0.05%
Total votes		1,362,146	100.00%
Republican hold			

=== Special election ===
==== Candidates ====
- John W. Bailey (Democratic)
- Francis W. Elliott (Socialist)
- Arthur H. Vandenberg, interim appointee Senator (Republican)

==== Results ====
1928 U.S. Senate special election in Michigan
Party	Candidate	Votes	%
Republican	Arthur H. Vandenberg	974,203	72.03%
Democratic	John W. Bailey	375,673	27.78%
Socialist	Francis W. Elliott	2,682	0.20%
Total votes		1,352,558	100.00%
Republican hold			

== See also ==
- 1928 United States Senate elections
