= 1962 United States Senate special election in Kansas =

- November 6, 1962
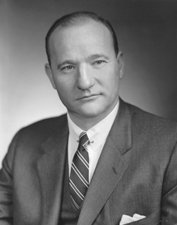

Nominee	James B. Pearson	Paul L. Aylward
Party	Republican	Democratic
Popular vote	344,689	260,756
Percentage	56.21%	42.52%
- County results Pearson: 50–60% 60–70% 70–80% Aylward: 40–50% 50–60% 60–70%
U.S. senator before election
James B. Pearson
Republican
Elected U.S. Senator
James B. Pearson
Republican

The 1962 United States Senate special election in Kansas took place on November 6, 1962, to elect a U.S. Senator to complete the unexpired term of Senator Andrew Frank Schoeppel, who died on January 21, 1962. Former State Senator James B. Pearson was appointed on January 31, 1962, by Governor John Anderson Jr. to fill the vacancy until a special election could be held.

Pearson won the special election, defeating Democratic nominee Paul L. Aylward.

== Primary elections ==
Primary elections were held on August 7, 1962.

=== Democratic primary ===
==== Candidates ====
- Paul L. Aylward, attorney

==== Results ====
Democratic primary results
Party	Candidate	Votes	%
Democratic	Paul L. Aylward	unopposed	

=== Republican primary ===
==== Candidates ====
- Edward F. Arn, former Governor of Kansas
- James B. Pearson, incumbent U.S. Senator

==== Results ====
Republican primary results
Party	Candidate	Votes	%
Republican	James B. Pearson (incumbent)	124,854	62.31
Republican	Edward F. Arn	75,524	37.69
Total votes		200,378	100.00

== General election ==
=== Results ===
1962 United States Senate special election in Kansas
Party	Candidate	Votes	%
Republican	James B. Pearson (incumbent)	344,689	56.21
Democratic	Paul L. Aylward	260,756	42.52
Prohibition	C. E. Cowen	7,804	1.27
Majority		83,933	13.69
Turnout		613,249	
Republican hold			

== See also ==
- 1962 United States Senate elections

== Bibliography ==
- Congressional Elections, 1946-1996. Washington, D.C.: Congressional Quarterly Inc. 1998. ISBN 1-56802-248-4.
- Scammon, Richard M., ed. (1964). America Votes 5: a handbook of contemporary American election statistics, 1962. Washington, D.C.: Governmental Affairs Institute.
