= 1924 United States Senate elections in Michigan =

- November 4, 1924
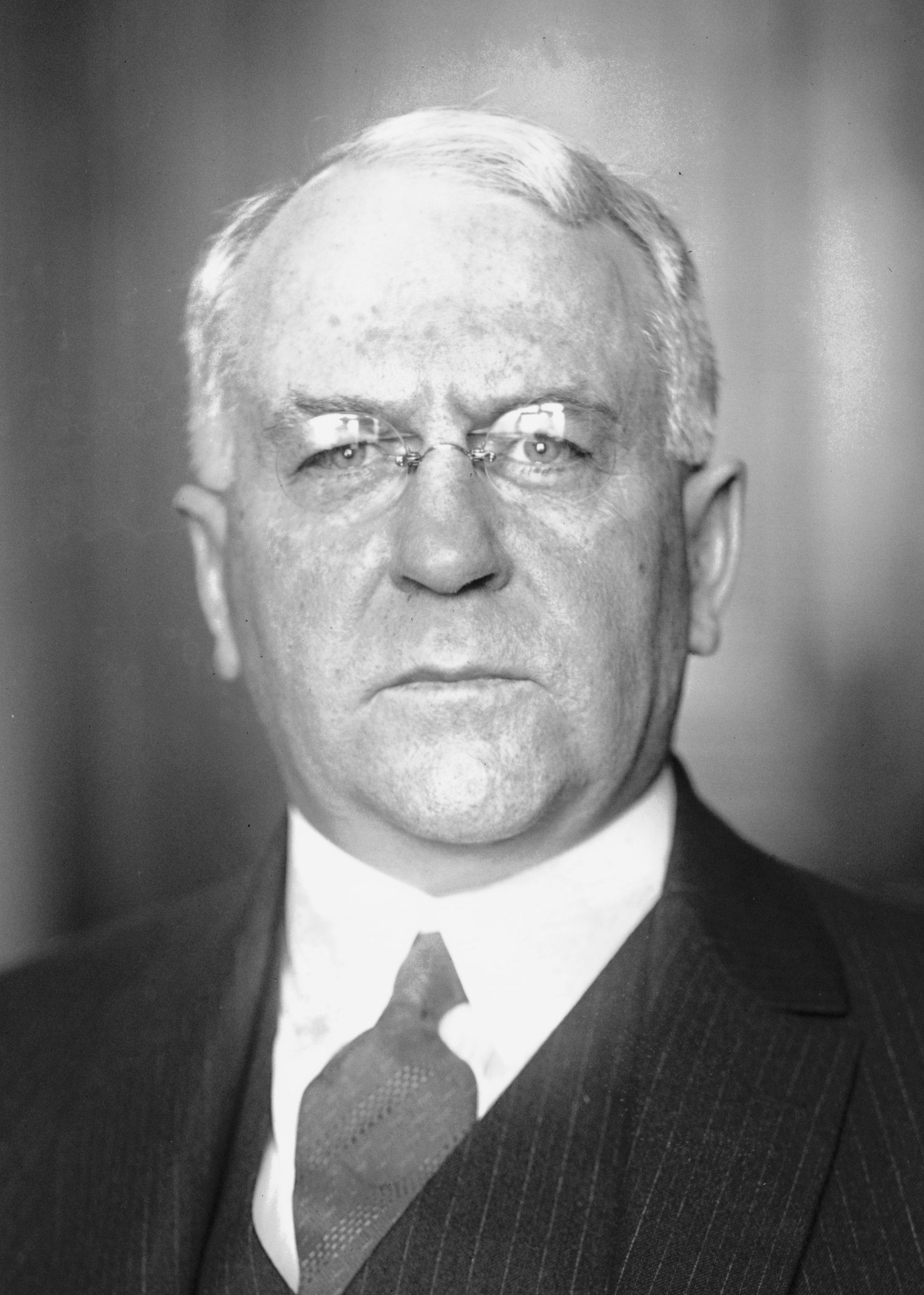

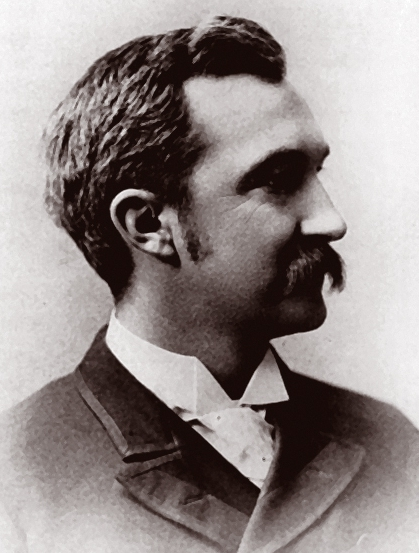
Nominee	James J. Couzens	Mortimer Cooley
Party	Republican	Democratic
Regular election	858,934; 74.27%	284,609; 24.61%
Special election	839,569; 75.04%	266,851; 23.85%
- County results Couzens: 50–60% 60–70% 70–80% 80–90% >90%
U.S. senator before election
James J. Couzens
Republican
Elected U.S. Senator
James J. Couzens
Republican

Two 1924 United States Senate elections in Michigan were held on November 4, 1924. Incumbent Republican U.S. Senator James J. Couzens, who was appointed following the resignation of Truman Newberry, was elected to a full term in a landslide. He also won the concurrent special election to serve out the remainder of Newberry's term (for the remainder of the 68th Congress), defeating the same candidates by roughly the same margin.

== Background ==
In 1918, Truman Newberry defeated Henry Ford to win a six-year term in the United States Senate. Each candidate accused the other of campaign spending impropriety. Newberry was ultimately convicted of bribery, corruption of the press and elections boards, and voter fraud, though his convictions were overturned by the United States Supreme Court in Newberry v. United States. Following a separate Senate investigation, Newberry was permitted to take the seat but formally admonished for his excessive spending. Facing renewed calls for his removal from office, Newberry resigned effective November 18, 1922.

Governor Alex J. Groesbeck appointed James J. Couzens, the mayor of Detroit and a former Ford Motor Company executive, to fill the vacant seat until a successor could be duly elected. Couzens was sworn in on November 29, 1922. A special election for the remainder of Newberry's unexpired term was scheduled for November 4, 1924, concurrent with the next general election to the seat.

== General election ==
=== Candidates ===
- Mortimer Elwyn Cooley, professor at University of Michigan and former president of the American Society of Mechanical Engineers (Democratic)
- James J. Couzens, incumbent U.S. Senator since 1922 and former Mayor of Detroit (Republican)
- Logan M. Cunningham (Socialist Labor)
- Albert L. Day (Socialist)
- Frank E. Titus (Prohibition)

=== Results ===
1924 U.S. Senate election in Michigan
Party	Candidate	Votes	%	±%
Republican	James J. Couzens (incumbent)	858,934	74.27%	▲24.08
Democratic	Mortimer Elwyn Cooley	284,609	24.61%	▼23.86
Prohibition	Frank E. Titus	8,330	0.72%	▲0.46
Socialist Labor	Logan M. Cunningham	3,080	0.27%	N/A
Socialist	Albert L. Day	1,619	0.14%	▼0.95
Total votes		1,156,572	100.00%	
Republican hold				

=== Special election results ===
1924 U.S. Senate election in Michigan
Party	Candidate	Votes	%	±%
Republican	James J. Couzens (incumbent)	839,569	75.04%	
Democratic	Mortimer Elwyn Cooley	266,851	23.85%	
Prohibition	Frank E. Titus	7,452	0.67%	
Socialist Labor	Logan M. Cunningham	3,360	0.30%	N/A
Socialist	Albert L. Day	1,555	0.14%	
Write-in		16	0.00%	
Total votes		1,118,803	100.00%	
Republican hold				

== See also ==
- 1924 United States Senate elections
