= 1946 United States Senate election in Washington =

- November 5, 1946
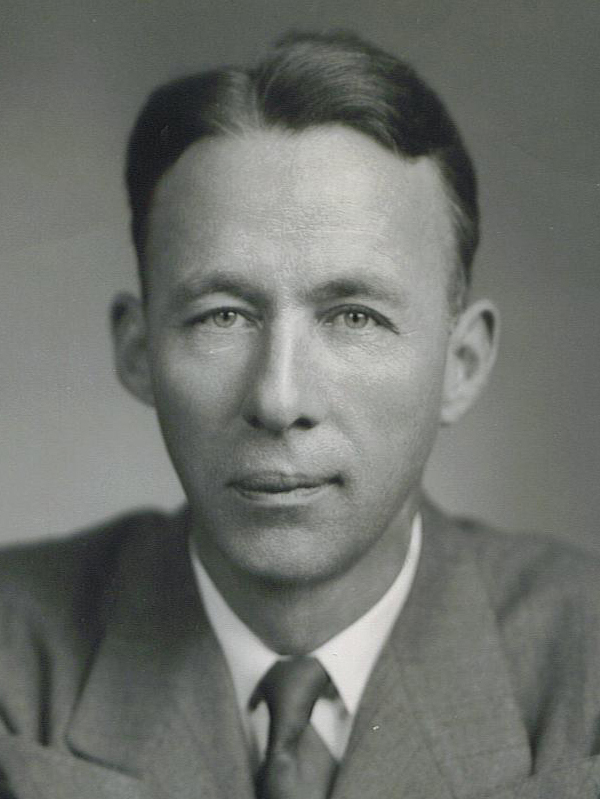

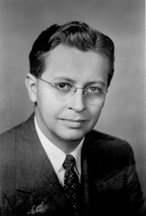
Nominee	Harry Cain	Hugh Mitchell
Party	Republican	Democratic
Popular vote	358,847	298,683
Percentage	54.34%	45.23%
- County results Cain: 40–50% 50–60% 60–70% 70–80% Mitchell: 40–50% 50–60%
U.S. senator before election
Hugh Mitchell
Democratic
Elected U.S. Senator
Harry Cain
Republican

The 1946 United States Senate election in Washington was held on November 5, 1946. Incumbent Democrat Hugh Mitchell, who had been appointed to fill the unexpired term of Monrad Wallgren, ran for a full term in office, but was defeated by Republican Mayor of Tacoma Harry Cain.

After this election, no Republican would be elected to either of Washington's U.S. Senate seats until 1980, when Slade Gorton defeated incumbent Warren Magnuson; while no Republican would win this Senate seat until 1983; when Daniel J. Evans defeated Mike Lowry in the special election after the death of Cain's successor, Henry M. Jackson.

== Blanket primary ==
=== Candidates ===
==== Democratic ====
- Sam C. Herren
- Russell Fluent, Washington State Treasurer
- Hugh Mitchell, interim U.S. Senator since 1945

==== Republican ====
- Harry Cain, Mayor of Tacoma
- J. Parkhurst Douglass

=== Results ===
1946 U.S. Senate primary election in Washington
Party	Candidate	Votes	%
Republican	Harry Cain	158,596	43.88%
Democratic	Hugh Mitchell (incumbent)	134,286	37.15%
Democratic	Russell H. Fluent	35,758	9.89%
Republican	Ed F. Oldfield	21,017	5.82%
Republican	Sam C. Herren	11,789	3.26%
Total votes		361,446	100.00%

== General election ==
=== Results ===
1946 U.S. Senate election in Washington
Party	Candidate	Votes	%	±%
Republican	Harry Cain	358,847	54.34%	▲8.50
Democratic	Hugh Mitchell (incumbent)	298,683	45.23%	▼8.93
Socialist Labor	Harry Morton	2,297	0.35%	N/A
Socialist Workers	Charles R. Swett	515	0.08%	N/A
Total votes		660,342	100.00%	
Republican gain from Democratic		Swing		

== See also ==
- 1946 United States Senate elections
