= Harry P. Cain =

American politician (1906–1979)

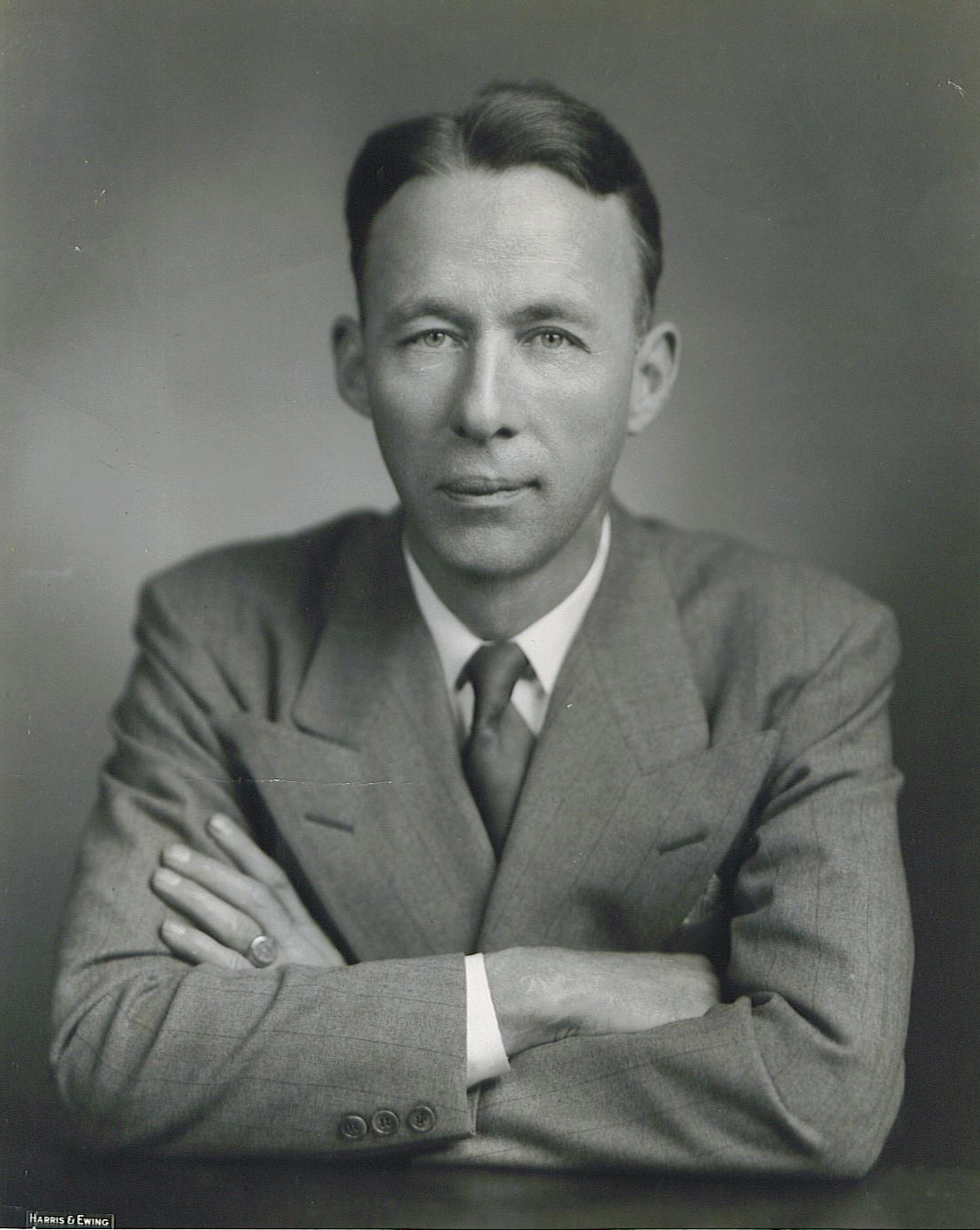
- Portrait by Harris & Ewing c. 1946–1953

Member of the Dade County Board of Commissioners
- In office April 13, 1972 – November 16, 1976

United States Senator from Washington
- In office December 26, 1946 – January 3, 1953
- Preceded by: Hugh Mitchell
- Succeeded by: Henry M. Jackson

23rd Mayor of Tacoma
- In office 1940–1946
- Preceded by: J. J. Kaufman
- Succeeded by: C. Val Fawcett

Personal details
- Born: Harry Pulliam Cain; January 10, 1906 Nashville, Tennessee, U.S.
- Died: March 3, 1979 (aged 73) Miami Lakes, Florida, U.S.
- Party: Republican
- Spouse(s): Marjorie Elloise Dils (m. 1934; div. 1958) LaVonne Kneisley (m. 1958)
- Children: 2
- Education: Sewanee: The University of the South (BA)

Military service
- Allegiance: United States
- Branch/service: United States Army
- Years of service: 1943–1945
- Rank: Colonel
- Battles/wars: World War II

Harry Pulliam Cain (January 10, 1906 – March 3, 1979) was an American politician who served as a United States senator from Washington who served as a Republican from 1946 to 1953. Cain is mainly remembered for his conservative and often highly-controversial views as a member of the Senate and as a friend and supporter of Senator Joseph McCarthy. Prior to his term in the Senate, he had served as the 23rd mayor of Tacoma, Washington. Following his Senate term he was widely recognized as a defender of the civil liberties of individuals accused of being security risks during the Eisenhower administration and as a community activist and moderate Republican until his death in 1979.

In a 1972 interview, Cain described himself as being, "basically a political pragmatist – from time to time and for different reasons a conservative, militant, liberal, moderate, purist, radical and now and again what some call a populist". Acknowledging that his career had been known for its inconsistencies, he said, "The record consists of doing the best I could when confronted by any situation demanding action."

== Early life and education ==
Harry Pulliam Cain and his twin brother were born in Nashville, Tennessee. Both parents were of Scots-Irish descent who had moved from Virginia, Alabama, and Kentucky. Their boys were taught a strong appreciation for their southern heritage and family history. The family moved to Tacoma in 1911. Both parents were accomplished writers. His mother suffered from depression and committed suicide in 1917. Shortly after her death, Cain suffered an attack of Bell's palsy, crippling his ability to speak. He eventually regained his speech.

Cain attended the Tacoma public schools and then, in 1920, enrolled at Hill Military Academy in Portland, Oregon, where he was a star athlete and edited the school newspaper. He spent 1924 and 1925 working as a reporter for the now-defunct Portland News-Telegram. He attended Sewanee: The University of the South in Sewanee, Tennessee, graduating in 1929. His intellectual hero was the eighteenth-century British philosopher and statesman, Edmund Burke. Upon graduation he received an offer of work from The New York Times.

== Career ==
Before moving to New York City, Cain visited his father in Tacoma but finding him in ill health, decided to remain. He was employed by the Tacoma branch of The Bank of California, N.A. (now Union Bank, N.A.) where he remained until 1939.

When Tacoma was selected to host the 1939 Golden Jubilee Celebration, celebrating fifty years of Washington statehood, Cain was selected as its festival director. The success of the event led Cain to run for the non-partisan position of Mayor of Tacoma in a special election to complete the two-year term of the interim mayor who decided not to run again. A conservative Democrat, Cain voted twice for President Franklin Roosevelt but became disenchanted with the New Deal after 1936. Cain placed third in the primary election. Four days before the general election, the leading candidate died of a stroke and Cain's name was added to the ballot. The dead candidate's supporters backed Cain and he was elected mayor at the age of 34.

=== Mayor of Tacoma ===
Cain's terms as mayor were characterized by his enthusiasm and very public approach to governing, including a weekly radio program that was uncommon for the time. His first term was also characterized by the build-up for World War II at the shipyards and military bases around Tacoma, and for the collapse of the Tacoma Narrows Bridge. Following the Japanese attack at Pearl Harbor, Hawaii, Cain was one of only two elected officials on the West Coast to publicly oppose the government's internment of 110,000 Japanese.

In 1942, Cain was re-elected mayor by the largest plurality in Tacoma's history. His second term was characterized by his aggressive efforts to clean up long-existing vice, to obtain funding for wartime housing, to institute a long-range planning process for the city, to reform the outdated City Commission form of government, and opposition from his fellow city commissioners to each of the above.

=== World War II ===
He took a leave of absence on May 5, 1943 to enter the United States Army as a major. Following training at the Army's School of Military Government, Cain was assigned to Allied Military Government for Occupied Territories (AMGOT) in Algiers, Algeria. After field training in Sicily, Cain participated in the invasion of Italy, landing on the beachhead at Salerno, Italy attached to a glider regiment of the U.S. 82nd Airborne Division on September 15, 1943. Cain was placed in charge of 29 towns and villages near Naples, Italy, trying to meet the needs of starving displaced civilians caught between the two armies. Cain later served in various staff positions on the staff of the newly formed Allied Control Commission (ACC) and the Rome Area Command of the U.S. Fifth Army. He was present during the fighting for Monte Cassino and the invasion of Anzio, two of the bloodiest battles of the Italian campaign.

In March 1944, Cain was assigned to SHAEF headquarters in London, England where he directed the psychological warfare and public relations division of the G-5 Civil Affairs staff. Promoted to lieutenant colonel, he worked with many famous writers and journalists including Archibald MacLeish and Edward R. Murrow. In April 1944, Cain was approached by political supporters in Washington state to run as a Republican for the open U.S. Senate seat in the 1944 election. Although Cain was unable to campaign actively, he won the Republican primary and faced popular Democratic Representative Warren G. Magnuson in the general election. Cain ran a respectable campaign, but fell behind in the final weeks of the campaign, losing to Magnuson by 88,000 votes.

While he was running for the Senate and carrying out his staff duties in London, the Invasion of Normandy and Operation Market Garden had taken place and Cain had missed both of them. He longed for an assignment in the field with a combat unit. In September, he was assigned to the XVIII Airborne Corps, commanded by Major General Matthew Ridgway, as Assistant Chief of Staff for Civil Affairs (G-5). During the Battle of the Bulge in December, Ridgway's Corps was instrumental in plugging the gap and Cain was in the thick of the fighting. Responsible for trying to protect and feed the civilians caught in the middle, Cain received a battlefield promotion to Colonel.

Cain participated in the planning for Operation Varsity, the elimination of the Ruhr Pocket, and the Allied push into Northern Germany. He was slightly wounded 24 hours before the end of hostilities on May 7, 1945. A day later, Cain delivered a speech at the burial of approximately 200 concentration camp victims near the town of Hagenow, Germany. General Ridgway remembered the speech in his memoirs as "one of the most effective I have ever heard".

Cain's last military assignment was inspecting General George S. Patton's controversial military government procedures during the military occupation of Bavaria.

=== U.S. Senate ===
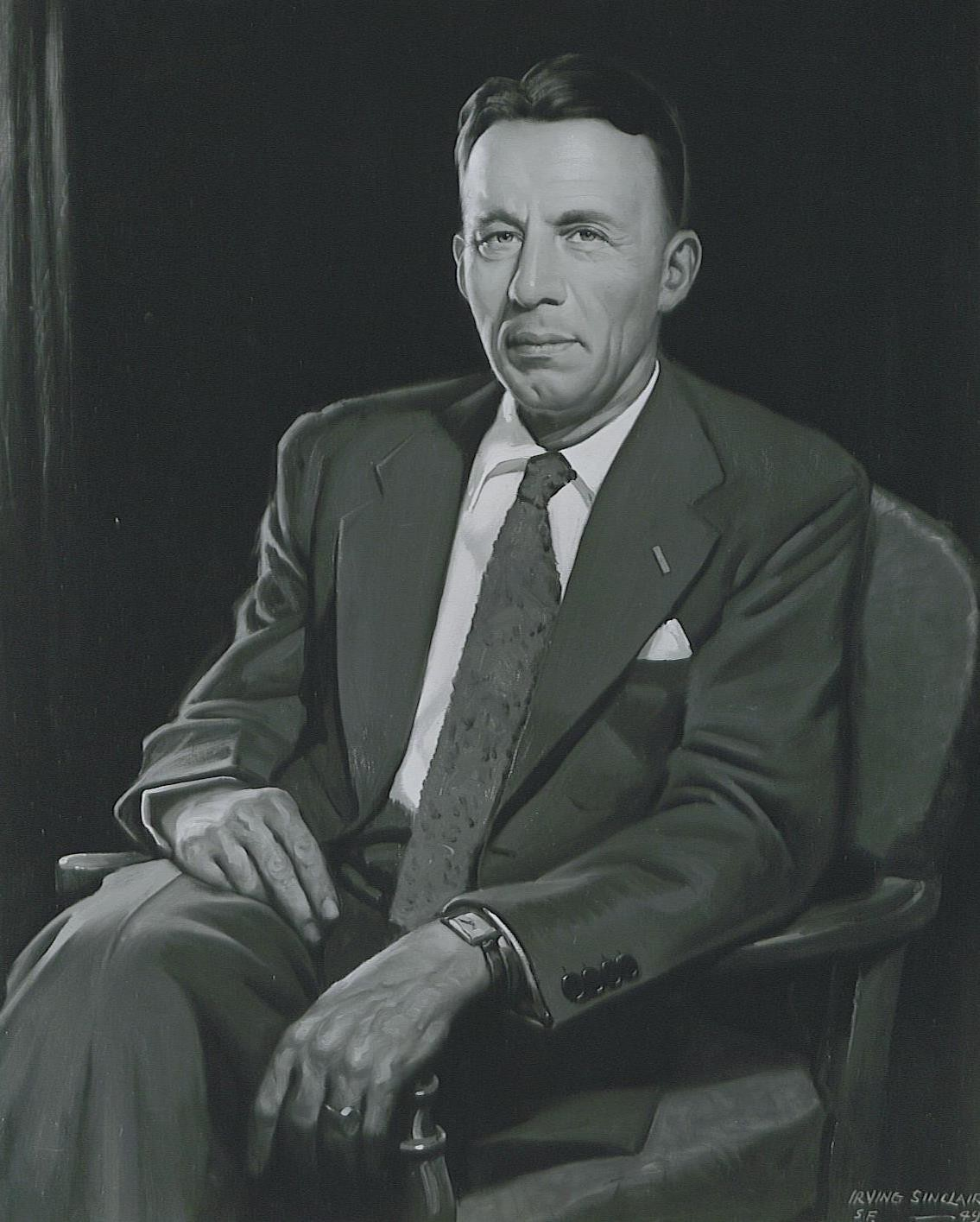
Cain's official U.S. Senate portrait, 1949

After the war, Cain resumed his duties as mayor of Tacoma, but resigned on June 15, 1946, to run again for the Senate. He was elected to the Senate on November 5, 1946, defeating Democrat Hugh B. Mitchell, an affable, competent, and decidedly uncharismatic campaigner who had recently been appointed to the position, by more than 60,000 votes. In this campaign Cain first began to raise the allegations of ties to Communist front organizations against Mitchell and other state Democrats.

Cain served in the Senate from December 26, 1946, to January 3, 1953. He became associated with the midwestern, conservative bloc of the Republican Party led by Robert A. Taft and Arthur H. Vandenberg. His term was controversial and marked by often inflammatory rhetoric and positions on issues that were sometimes seen as being at odds with the best interests of his constituents. Cain later discussed his approach to serving in the Senate in a 1949 interview. "I had decided to listen only to my conscience and my instinct and do what seemed right at the time. Why not? A man in public office might as well play it the way he thinks he should. There is no sure way to stay in public office."

He voted for the Taft-Hartley Act, against a 70-group Air Force, against an expansion in Social Security benefits and generally against public power. He was generally considered to be the real estate industry's strongest supporter in Congress and once made an extended speech attacking Time magazine for including him on a list of the "Senate's Most Expendable" members. He engaged in two notable filibusters; the first a 6 3 /4 hour successful effort to block the nomination of former Washington Governor and Senator Mon C. Wallgren to be director of the National Security Resources Board, and a longer 12 1 /2 hour unsuccessful effort to block an extension of federal rent controls. While in the Senate, he generally supported the efforts of Senator Joseph McCarthy and others to identify and dismiss government employees who were alleged to be communist security risks. During the Korean War, he opposed the firing of General Douglas MacArthur and supported extending the war to mainland China.

As Cain's term in the Senate wound down, he was targeted by the National Democratic Party for defeat in what otherwise looked like a very promising Republican year. With Hugh Mitchell running for Governor, Cain's opponent would be the popular six-term Congressman, Henry M. Jackson. The two fought a tough, bruising campaign, based largely on Cain's record in the Senate. Jackson overcame a national Republican landslide to beat Cain by more than 130,000 votes.

Cain once responded to a comment that he had been a "reactionary" in the U.S. Senate. "as a reactionary I reacted strongly against measures believed to be adverse to the public interest. It seldom bothered me that a number of my positions were supported only by a small minority. Had I been concerned with self rather than country I would have acted much differently. I was often angry and too impatient for my own good."

=== Subversive Activities Control Board ===
At the urging of some of his former Senate colleagues, President Dwight D. Eisenhower appointed Cain to the Subversive Activities Control Board, where he served from 1953 to 1956.

Cain went about his new duties, generally supporting the recommendations brought to the board by Attorney General Herbert Brownell Jr. Cain soon became aware of numerous cases in which the government's internal security program, while legal, often violated the civil liberties of the accused and sometimes denied them due process under the law. He began to speak out against what he believed to be the excesses of the program in a series of speeches to national civil liberties groups, to the point that White House Chief of Staff Sherman Adams and members of the Justice Department considered him disloyal. The Eisenhower administration, under pressure from the right wing of their party, saw their internal security program as a means of eliminating security risks from government; Cain saw the program as often trampling on the civil rights of the accused. The confrontation came to a head in a contentious meeting between Cain and the President in the White House on June 7, 1955. Cain determined that he would not to be re-appointed to the position and resigned on June 17, 1955.

On October 23, 1956, a banquet in Cain's honor was held at the National Press Club and attended by more than 350 civil liberties advocates, labor leaders and political admirers, including many of the individuals who Cain had helped. A plaque was presented to Cain with the following inscription: "In Tribute to Harry P. Cain / Champion of Human Dignity, Defender of Constitutional Rights in the Search For National Security / From Those Whose Loyalty to Country He Vindicated, and Those Whose Faith in Freedom He Strengthened / Presented at Testimonial Dinner / National Press Club, Washington, D.C. / 23 October 1956."

=== Later career ===
Never wealthy, Cain returned to Tacoma with limited prospects and even less money. Both major parties found him unpredictable. To make matters worse, his marriage was unraveling. He lectured briefly at Yale University and looked for a job. He found it in Miami, Florida, where old friends hired him to manage the public relations and, later, the community relations of a large Miami-based savings and loan association.

In May 1957, he was called to testify at Arthur Miller's trial for contempt of Congress. He was Miller's "expert witness on communism" and he testified that he "did not believe" that Miller had written his plays "under the discipline of the Communist Party". His testimony was unusual in that normally only the government produced 'expert testimony' to demonstrate that the defendant was a Communist. In January 1964 he testified in a libel trial brought on behalf of John Goldmark, a Washington state legislator who had been defeated partially on the basis of allegations that his membership in the ACLU was tantamount to being a member of a Communist-front organization. Cain testified that the ACLU had never been on the Attorney General's list of such organizations and Goldmark won a sizable award from the defendants.

Cain became a familiar face on Miami television, hosting and interviewing national political personalities on a weekly public affairs program that the bank sponsored. He also became active in numerous community and civic activities.

He remained active in Republican politics and worked to liberalize and broaden the face of the party in Dade County and throughout the state. In 1962 he managed the congressional campaign of Republican newcomer Robert A. Peterson against Claude Pepper. Peterson lost, but Cain established himself as a viable political force in Florida. He considered running for the U.S. Senate in 1964 and again in 1968, but his moderate positions on social issues were in variance with the state party. In 1964, he chaired the Florida Citizens for Johnson-Humphrey, backing the Democratic Party ticket, but by 1968, he supported Nelson Rockefeller and Richard Nixon due to his opposition to the Vietnam War. In 1972, he supported his old opponent, Henry Jackson, for the Democratic presidential nomination and campaigned with him in Florida.

In 1972, Cain was appointed to the Metropolitan Miami-Dade County Commission. He championed one of the first indoor smoking bans in the country and other measures ensuring equal rights in jobs, housing and public accommodation. In failing health, he was defeated for re-election in 1976.

== Personal life ==
He married Marjorie Elloise Dils of Seattle, Washington on September 22, 1934. They had two children: Harry Jr. (Buzzy) and Candy. From 1935 to 1936, the couple took an extended trip to England and Germany, where they immersed themselves in theater and he studied British banking methods and listened to the colorful orators in London's Hyde Park. While in Germany, Cain attended several mass rallies where Adolf Hitler and other top Nazi leaders spoke and returned home convinced that Germany presented a major world threat, making more than 150 speeches to local and statewide groups about what he had seen. The Cains divorced on February 4, 1958. On July 18, 1958, he married LaVonne Kneisley in Chevy Chase, Maryland, a family friend since the mid-1930s.

=== Death ===
He died of complications from emphysema at his home in Miami Lakes, Florida, on March 3, 1979. He was cremated and his ashes scattered on his favorite golf course in Bethesda, Maryland.

== See also ==
- List of mayors of Tacoma, Washington

Party political offices
Preceded by Ewing D. Colvin	Republican nominee for U.S. Senator from Washington (Class 3); 1944	Succeeded by Walter Williams
Preceded by Stephen F. Chadwick	Republican nominee for U.S. Senator from Washington (Class 1); 1946, 1952	Succeeded by William B. Bantz
U.S. Senate
Preceded by Hugh B. Mitchell	U.S. senator (Class 1) from Washington; December 26, 1946 – January 3, 1953; Served alongside: Warren Magnuson	Succeeded by Henry M. Jackson
