= James B. Pearson =

American politician (1920–2009)

James Pearson
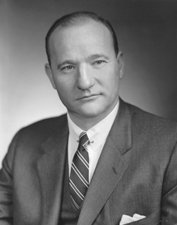

United States Senator from Kansas
- In office January 31, 1962 – December 23, 1978
- Preceded by: Andrew F. Schoeppel
- Succeeded by: Nancy Kassebaum

Chair of the Kansas Republican Party
- In office August 30, 1960 – December 8, 1960
- Preceded by: Sam Mellinger
- Succeeded by: Donald Schnacke

Member of the Kansas Senate from the 6th district
- In office January 8, 1957 – January 10, 1961
- Preceded by: John Anderson Jr.
- Succeeded by: Clark Kuppinger

Personal details
- Born: James Blackwood Pearson; May 7, 1920 Nashville, Tennessee, U.S.
- Died: January 13, 2009 (aged 88) Gloucester, Massachusetts, U.S.
- Party: Republican
- Spouse(s): Martha Mitchell; Margaret Lynch
- Children: 4
- Education: Duke University (BA); University of Virginia (LLB)

Military service
- Allegiance: United States
- Branch/service: United States Navy
- Years of service: 1943–1946
- Rank: Lieutenant
- Battles/wars: World War II

James Blackwood Pearson (May 7, 1920 – January 13, 2009) was an American politician from Kansas who served as a member of the United States Senate from 1962 to 1978.

== Biography ==
James Pearson was born in 1920 in Nashville, Tennessee, the son of a Methodist minister. With his parents, he moved to Virginia in 1934 and attended public school. He went on to attend college at Duke University in Durham, North Carolina. During the Second World War he interrupted his schooling to serve as a pilot in the air transport service of the United States Navy, flying DC3's across country (1943–1946), and was discharged as a lieutenant.

Pearson's legislative accomplishments included the "National Weather Modification Policy Act," which authorizes a member of the cabinet to "negotiate an International agreement concerning the peaceful uses of weather modification." It was written into public law October 13, 1976.

Stationed at the Olathe Naval Air Station in Kansas, Pearson met and married the former Martha Mitchell. Pearson graduated from the law school of the University of Virginia at Charlottesville in 1950. He was admitted to the bar and commenced the practice of law in Mission, Kansas. Pearson served as Assistant County Attorney of Johnson County, Kansas, from 1952 to 1954; County Probate Judge from 1954 to 1956; and was elected to the State Senate, where he served from 1956 to 1960. He did not seek reelection but returned to the practice of law. Pearson campaigned with Attorney General John Anderson for governor in 1960. Anderson was elected and Pearson became the state GOP chairman. On January 31, 1962, Anderson appointed Pearson to the United States Senate to fill the vacancy caused by the death of Andrew F. Schoeppel. Pearson was elected on November 6, 1962, in a special election for the term ending January 3, 1967; reelected in 1966 for a full six-year term, and again in 1972.

Pearson initially voted regularly with the leadership of his party, opposing Lyndon B. Johnson's Great Society programs. However Pearson moderated his positions with time. Following the Kent State shooting in 1970, Pearson shifted his position to oppose the bombing of Laos and Cambodia during the Vietnam War. In the Senate he became known for working with colleagues across the political aisle. By the 1970s, Pearson got 20% ratings from the Americans for Constitutional Action organization.

When a group of senators led by Walter Mondale of Minnesota set out to change the filibuster rule, which had been used to block civil rights legislation, they asked Pearson to join them. Together they reduced the number of votes required to end debate from 67 to 60. Pearson voted in favor of the Civil Rights Acts of 1964 and 1968, as well as the 24th Amendment to the U.S. Constitution, the Voting Rights Act of 1965, and the confirmation of Thurgood Marshall to the U.S. Supreme Court.

Pearson's other legislative accomplishments came as a member of the Commerce Committee, where he was the ranking minority member of its aviation subcommittee. Those successes included the creation of the airport/airways trust fund, which allowed for the expansion of the nation's airports and air traffic system, and the deregulation of "new" natural gas, which brought increased production of that clean-burning fuel.

Pearson collaborated with Senator Howard Cannon (D-NV) and others, on the former legislation and Senators Russell B. Long (D-LA) and Lloyd Bentsen (D-TX) on the latter.

Pearson and Fred R. Harris (D-OK) introduced the first major legislation with economic incentives for rural development. With Philip Hart (D-MI), Pearson sponsored the first major campaign reform legislation following World War II. Pearson was an early supporter of consumer protection legislation.

Pearson was a member of the Wednesday Club, a group of moderate and liberal Republican senators who met for lunch to discuss issues. He opposed President Richard Nixon on several Cold War issues, but voted with the president on the Safeguard anti-missile program, which narrowly passed the Senate. The president and his national security advisor, Henry Kissinger, took that program to Moscow and negotiated the abolition of such systems.

Back in Kansas, Pearson was considered by some conservatives as not "Republican enough." He dealt with this criticism by providing strong constituent service and championing Kansas interests, especially the aviation, oil and gas, and cattle industries. Pearson braved this criticism by introducing his University of Virginia Law School classmate, Robert F. Kennedy, at the University of Kansas and Kansas State University just days after Kennedy had announced he would run for president. On the podium, smiling, Pearson wished Kennedy a long, successful career in the Senate.

Following his reelection in 1972, Pearson was appointed by Nixon as a delegate to the United Nations General Assembly. He retired from the Senate in 1978 and was again named by the Senate to the U. N. delegation. Pearson was succeeded by Nancy Landon Kassebaum Baker.

After retiring from the Senate, Pearson and his second wife, the former Margaret Lynch, traveled frequently to Japan and Southeast Asia. Pearson served as a member of the Board of Governors of the East–West Center based in Honolulu, Hawaii, from 1983 to 1991. He and former Senator Ribicoff were selected by the Senate to co-chair a commission to study the structure and procedures of the Senate. After leaving the Senate Pearson had a relationship with the Washington, D. C. office of the law firm of LeBoeuf, Lamb, Lieby and MacRae.

A fellowship program named for Pearson allows foreign service officers to work temporarily in other branches of government, including state and local, to learn more about domestic politics. In Kansas, a Pearson Fellowship helps graduates of public universities study abroad. The U.S. Post Office in Prairie Village, Pearson's home town, was named the James B. Pearson Post Office in 2004.

Pearson's children include three sons, James, William, and Thomas, and a daughter, Laura.

Pearson served from January 31, 1962, until his resignation on December 23, 1978. He was not a candidate for re-election in 1978.

Pearson died on January 13, 2009, at his home in Gloucester, Massachusetts at the age of 88.

Until 2026, Pearson was the last person elected to the Senate who came from the Kansas City metropolitan area, even though Johnson County has the state's largest population.

Party political offices
Preceded by Andrew Frank Schoeppel	Republican nominee for U.S. Senator from Kansas (Class 2); 1962, 1966, 1972	Succeeded by Nancy Kassebaum
U.S. Senate
Preceded by Andrew Schoeppel	U.S. Senator (Class 2) from Kansas; 1962–1978; Served alongside: Frank Carlson, Bob Dole	Succeeded by Nancy Kassebaum
Preceded by Norris Cotton	Ranking Member of the Senate Commerce Committee; 1975–1979	Succeeded by Bob Packwood
New office	Chair of the Senate Practices and Procedures Study Group; 1982–1983; Served alongside: Abraham Ribicoff	Position abolished
