= Smathers =

Smathers is a surname, and may refer to

- Bruce Smathers (born 1943), American politician, son of George
- George Smathers (1913–2007), American politician, nephew of William
- James Fields Smathers (1888–1967), American typewriter inventor
- Jason Smathers, AOL employee convicted of selling customer email addresses
- O. K. Smathers (1914–1997), American archer
- Patrick Smathers, American mayor
- William H. Smathers (1891–1955), American politician

== See also ==
- George A. Smathers Libraries, University of Florida
- Smathers Beach, Florida
- Smithers (name)
- Smothers, a surname
