= Transportation Act =

Transportation Act may refer to:

== Canada ==
- Canada Transportation Act

== Great Britain ==
- Transportation Act 1718

== United States ==
- Transportation Act of 1958
- Transportation Act of 2005
