= Dante Fascell =

American politician (1917–1998)

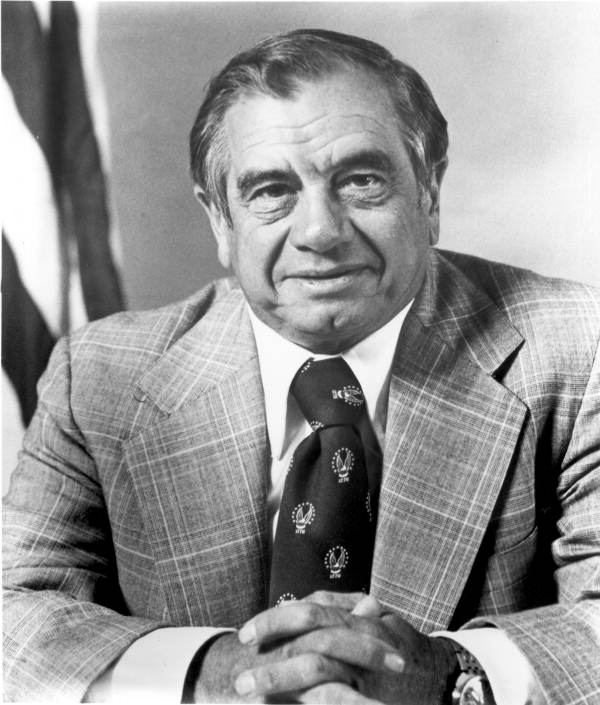

Chair of the House Foreign Affairs Committee
- In office December 3, 1983 – January 3, 1993
- Preceded by: Clement J. Zablocki
- Succeeded by: Lee H. Hamilton

Member of the U.S. House of Representatives from Florida
- In office January 3, 1955 – January 3, 1993
- Preceded by: Bill Lantaff
- Succeeded by: Peter Deutsch (Redistricting)
- Constituency: 4th district (1955–1967); 12th district (1967–1973); 15th district (1973–1983); 19th district (1983–1993)

Member of the Florida House of Representatives
- In office 1950–1954

Personal details
- Born: Dante Bruno Fascell; March 9, 1917 Bridgehampton, New York, U.S.
- Died: November 28, 1998 (aged 81) Clearwater, Florida, U.S.
- Party: Democratic
- Spouse: Jeanne-Marie Fascell
- Relatives: Ben Diamond (grandson)
- Education: University of Miami (JD)
- Dante Fascell's voice Dante Fascell on the importance of combatting the illegal drug trade Recorded November 21, 1989

Dante Bruno Fascell (March 9, 1917 – November 28, 1998) was an American World War II veteran and liberal politician who represented Florida as a member of the United States House of Representatives from 1955 to 1993. He served as chairman of the House Foreign Affairs Committee for nine years.

== Early life and education ==
Dante Fascell was born in 1917 in Bridgehampton, New York. In 1925, his family moved to Florida. In 1938, he graduated from the University of Miami School of Law. Fascell was a brother of Phi Mu Alpha Sinfonia fraternity and the Kappa Sigma fraternity. While a University of Miami law school student, Fascell was inducted into its Iron Arrow Honor Society, the University of Miami's highest honor.

=== Military service ===
Fascell joined the Florida National Guard in 1941 and was commissioned as a second lieutenant in 1942, serving in the African, Sicilian, and Italian Campaigns during World War II, eventually rising to the rank of captain.

== Political career ==
Fascell was elected to the Florida House of Representatives in 1950.

=== Congress ===
In 1954 he was elected to the U.S. House of Representatives as a Democrat in a district representing Dade County, Florida.

Fascell was the sole Democratic representative from the state of Florida (1 of 7) to not sign the 1956 Southern Manifesto. Fascell would later go on to vote in favor of the Civil Rights Acts of 1960 and 1968, in addition to the 24th Amendment to the U.S. Constitution and the Voting Rights Act of 1965, but not the Civil Rights Acts of 1957 (though he agreed to the Anderson-Aiken amendment) or 1964.

Fascell began as a supporter of the Vietnam War, but he soon spoke out against the war. Fascell cosponsored the War Powers Act of 1973 and he won aid for Cuban-Americans who had settled in his district. He served as the chairman of the House Committee on Foreign Affairs from 1984 to 1993. He worked to repeal the Clark Amendment in 1985, allowing the U.S. government to send aid to UNITA rebels in Angola. He later served as a partner in the Black, Manafort, Stone and Kelly lobbying firm, which lobbied for funding UNITA.

Fascell worked to champion the creation of Biscayne National Park, south of Miami. It was signed into law by President Lyndon B. Johnson in 1968. The visitor center in the park is named after Representative Fascell. Similarly, a public park located in South Miami is named for him. The Dante B. Fascell North-South Center Act of 1991 established the prestigious think tank at the University of Miami.

=== Retirement and death ===
Fascell retired from the House after his 19th term ended in 1993. When President Bill Clinton took office he proposed to nominate Fascell as the United States Ambassador to Italy, however Fascell declined for family reasons as he had developed colorectal cancer. On October 29, 1998, Fascell was presented with the Presidential Medal of Freedom by President Clinton. He died the following month from colorectal cancer, at the age of 81.

== Publications ==
- Congress Commission on Security and Cooperation in Europe; Fascell, Dante B. (1977), Basket III, Implementation of the Helsinki Accords, Washington: U.S. G.P.O., OCLC 70310979
- Combatting International Terrorism : the Role of Congress, 1986, OCLC 769294159
- House Committee on International Relations; Fascell, Dante B. (1976), Commission on Security and Cooperation in Europe ... : Report to Accompany S.2679, Washington: U.S. Govt. Print. Off., OCLC 2236258
- Fascell, Dante B. (1987), Congress and Arms Control, OCLC 847013401
- House Committee on Foreign Affairs; Fascell, Dante B. (1961), Establishment of the Caribbean Organization : Report to Accompany H.J. Res. 384, Washington, DC: U.S. G.P.O., OCLC 35624037
- Fascell, Dante B.; Suchlicki, Jaime (2001), Fascell on Cuba : Selected Speeches and Statements on the Cuban Revolution, Fidel Castro and U.S.-Cuban Relations, Miami, Fla.: Institute for Cuban and Cuban-American Studies, University of Miami, OCLC 46461428
- House Committee on Government Operations; Balderston, C. Canby; Martin, Wm. McChesney Jr.; Mitchell, Geo. Wilder; United States. Congress; Farrell, John R.; Fascell, Dante B. (1966), Federal Reserve System--check Clearance Float Hearing Before a Subcommittee ... 89th, 2nd Sess. February 9, 1966, Washington: U.S. Govt. Print. Off., OCLC 21217645
- House Committee on Government Operations, Legal and Monetary Affairs Subcommittee; Fascell, Dante B. (1967), GAO Bid Protest Procedures : R̲̲eport, Washington: U.S. G.P.O., OCLC 26615100
- International Communications Policy : Preparing for the Future, London: University Press of America, 1987, OCLC 16924709
- International Communications Policy : Preparing for the Future : the Third David M. Abshire Endowed Lecture, October 8, 1985, Washington, D.C.: Center for Strategic and International Studies, Georgetown University, 1986, OCLC 13526652
- Fascell, Dante B. (1979), International News : Freedom Under Attack : With Essays by David M. Abshire, Beverly Hills, Calif., Sage Publications, OCLC 471775169
- Abshire, David M.; Fascell, Dante B.; Georgetown University. Center for Strategic and International Studies (1979), International News : Freedom Under Attack, Beverly Hills, Calif.: Sage Publications, OCLC 5103140
- House Committee on Foreign Affairs, Subcommittee on International Organizations and Movements; Fascell, Dante B. (1966), Report on Activities of the International Cooperation Year, Washington D.C.: U.S. G.P.O., OCLC 2188183
- Selden, Armistead I.; Fascell, Dante B.; United States. Congress. House. Committee on Foreign Affairs (1961), Special Study Mission to Latin America: Venezuela, Brazil, Argentina, Chile, Bolivia, Panama, Washington: U.S. Govt. Print. Off., OCLC 3290889
- Scheman, L. Ronald; Kennedy, Edward Moore, 1932-2009; Fascell, Dante B. (1988), The Alliance for Progress : a Retrospective, New York: Praeger, OCLC 468687033
- Fascell, Dante B.; United States. Congress. House. Committee on Foreign Affairs (1982), Twenty-third Meeting of the Canada-United States Interparliamentary Group, March 4-8, 1982, Washington, DC: U.S. G.P.O., OCLC 25397536
- United Nations Financial Situation Background and Consequences of the Article 19 Controversy Over the Financing of U. N. Peacekeeping Operations ..., Subcommittee on International Organizations and Movements of the Committee on Foreign Affairs, House of Representatives, Together with Hearings Before the Subcommittee, Washington, D.C.: U. S. Gov. Print. Off., 1966, OCLC 753644385
- House Committee on Foreign Affairs, Subcommittee on International Organizations and Movements; Fascell, Dante B. (1966), United Nations Financing : Background and Chronology of the Article 19 Controversy, Washington: U.S. G.P.O., OCLC 35621799

U.S. House of Representatives
Preceded by Bill Lantaff	Member of the U.S. House of Representatives from Florida's 4th congressional district 1955–1967	Succeeded by Syd Herlong
Preceded by William C. Cramer	Member of the U.S. House of Representatives from Florida's 12th congressional district 1967–1973	Succeeded by J. Herbert Burke
New constituency	Member of the U.S. House of Representatives from Florida's 15th congressional district 1973–1983	Succeeded by Clay Shaw
New constituency	Member of the U.S. House of Representatives from Florida's 19th congressional district 1983–1993	Succeeded by Harry Johnston
New office	Chair of the Joint Helsinki Commission; 1976–1985	Succeeded by Al D'Amato
Preceded by Clement J. Zablocki	Chair of the House Foreign Affairs Committee; 1983–1993	Succeeded by Lee H. Hamilton
Party political offices
Preceded by Les AuCoin, Joe Biden, Bill Bradley, Robert Byrd, Tom Daschle, Bill Hefner, Barbara B. Kennelly, George Miller, Tip O'Neill, Paul Tsongas, Tim Wirth	Response to the State of the Union address 1984; Served alongside: Max Baucus, Joe Biden, David L. Boren, Barbara Boxer, Robert Byrd, Bill Gray, Tom Harkin, Dee Huddleston, Carl Levin, Tip O'Neill, Claiborne Pell	Succeeded by Bill Clinton; Bob Graham; Tip O'Neill
