= William Homer Leavitt =

American painter

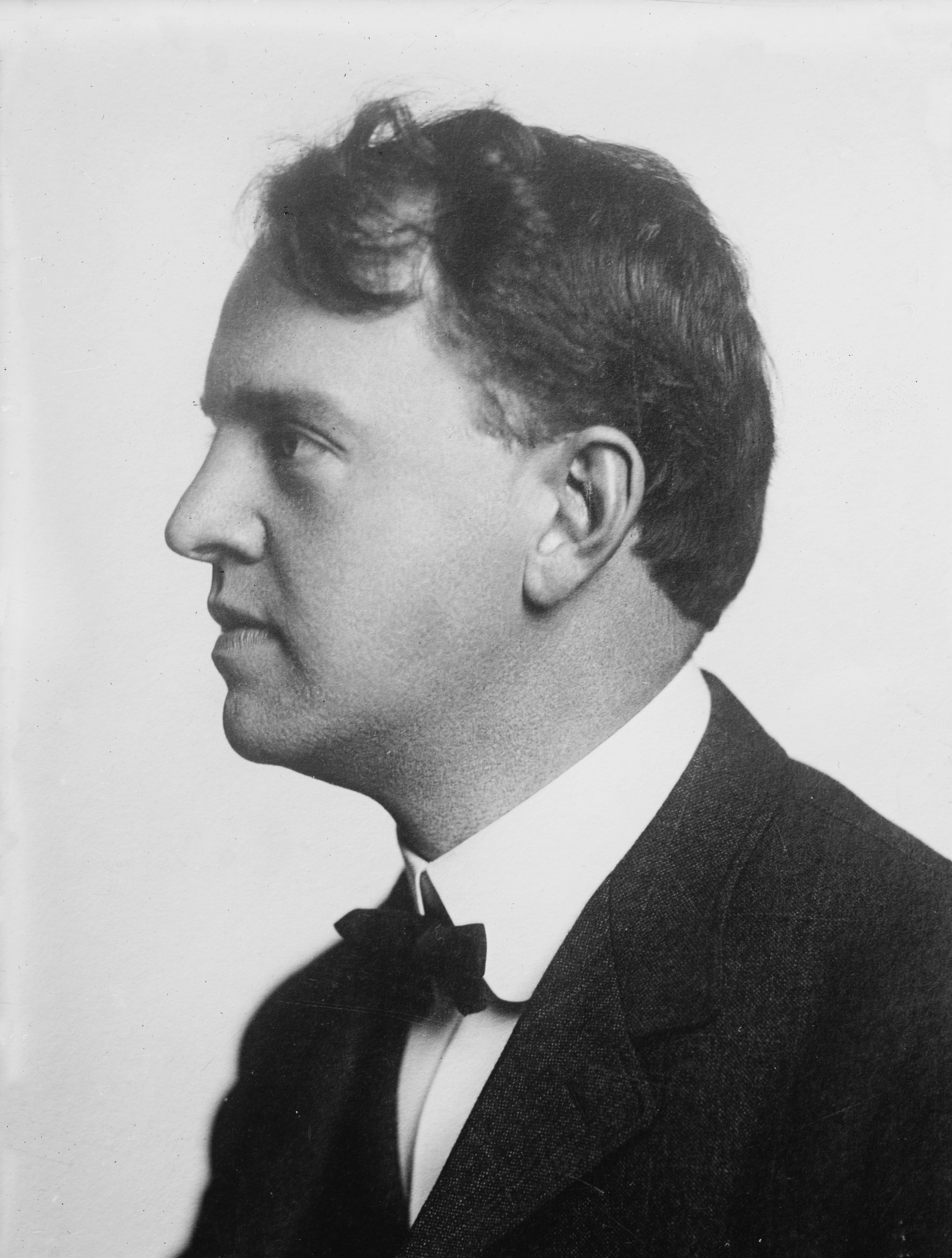
- Leavitt in 1904
- Born: April 23, 1868; Scituate, Massachusetts, U.S.
- Died: August 8, 1951 (aged 83); Winthrop, Massachusetts, U.S.
- Education: University of Nebraska
- Known for: Portrait paintings
- Spouse: Ruth Bryan Owen (m. 1903; div. 1909)

William Homer Leavitt (April 23, 1868 – August 8, 1951) was an American portrait painter who married the daughter of politician William Jennings Bryan. For a time, Leavitt was a sought-after society portraitist, until he departed for Paris to pursue his art. He was subsequently divorced by his wife, and his two children were raised by their politician grandfather. Leavitt's two children became the subject of a heated custody battle chronicled in the newspapers of the day.

== Early life and career ==
William Homer Leavitt was born in Scituate, Massachusetts, to Aaron Littlefield Leavitt and his wife Sarah (Clark) Leavitt. The family subsequently removed in 1880 to Newport, Rhode Island, where William Homer Leavitt, having studied art in Paris, returned and set himself up as a society portrait painter. He was much in demand, and among the many well-known figures he painted was United States General Joseph Wheeler, who after the portrait session lent Leavitt his black horse, Alabama. The horse bucked and threw Leavitt onto Newport's Bellevue Avenue. Initially Leavitt was not expected to recover, although he did later make a full recovery.

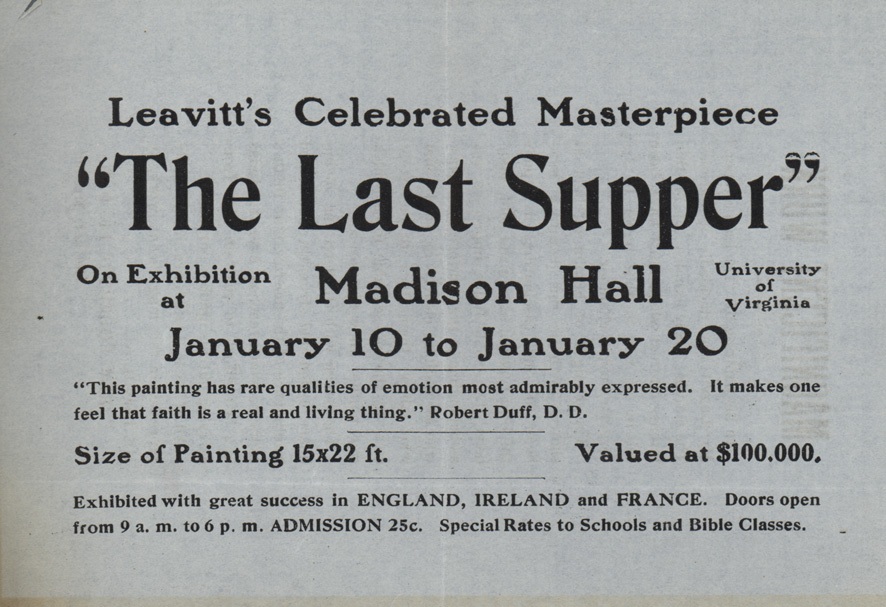
Exhibition advertisement for Leavitt's The Last Supper, 1911

Two years later Leavitt's career had taken off, causing The New York Times to note that "artist Leavitt has won distinction in his work and has a host of friends in intellectual circles." That same year, 1903, Leavitt went west to Lincoln, Nebraska, to paint the portrait of attorney and Presidential candidate William Jennings Bryan. The 32-year-old artist and the politician's 18-year-old daughter Ruth Bryan struck up a friendship. On September 17, 1903, the couple announced their plans to marry the next month, meaning the politician's daughter would leave her freshly started career at the University of Nebraska. In announcing the marriage, The New York Times noted that "Preparations [Were] Under Way to Make It an Elaborate Society Event."

But the big society wedding never transpired. Bryan opposed the match, because of the difference in ages of the couple, as well as the fact that Ruth had just begun college. The couple married, in a small civil ceremony – described by the newspapers as 'informal' – attended by Bryan's parents, the members of Ruth's college sorority and the widow of the college president and minister who had married William J. Bryan and his wife. Leavitt's mother traveled to Nebraska from Rhode Island for the wedding, which was held in the Bryan home at Lincoln. "In accordance with Miss Bryan's wishes and those of her parents," noted The Oswego Daily Times, "the wedding appointments will be void of any attempt at elaboration."

== Marital life and dissolution ==
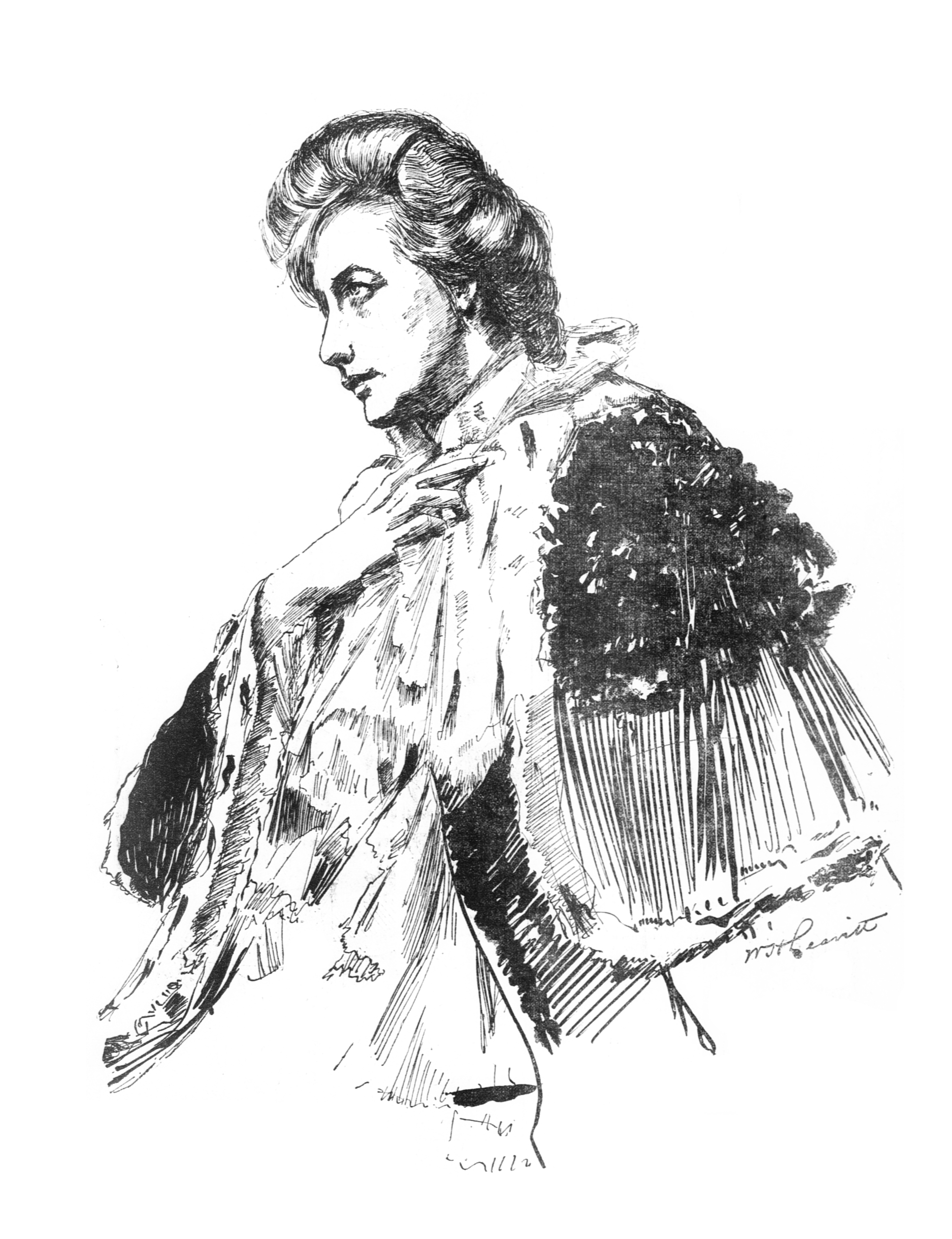
Leavitt's wife Ruth Bryan as sketched by Leavitt. 1903

Following the abbreviated ceremony, Leavitt and his wife departed for the East Coast and the South, and briefly to Europe where they honeymooned. Later the couple settled at their home at 81 Pelham Street in Newport, Rhode Island, where Leavitt set himself up in a studio devoted to his portraiture. But the union was apparently rocky from the start, and within six years Leavitt had departed for Paris to paint, and his wife sued for divorce on the grounds of non-support. William Bryan, a devout Presbyterian, was said to have opposed the divorce on religious grounds. Nevertheless, in 1909 Bryan's daughter's petition for divorce based on non-support was granted. Following the divorce, Ruth Bryan Leavitt (as she continued to be known) often filled her father's shoes in his speaking engagements.

The couple had two children, Ruth and Bryan Leavitt, who were favorites of grandfather William Jennings Bryan. At the Democratic National Convention in Denver, in 1908, newspapers carried photos of Bryan's two grandchildren, and noted that the candidate "was never happier than when bouncing on his knees Ruth and Bryan Leavitt." Following the divorce, Bryan assumed custody of the grandchildren. The following year, Ruth married Major Reginald A. Owen, a British Army officer, whom she met while studying voice in Germany. Following his ex-wife's remarriage, painter Leavitt told reporters that the nuptials – and his ex-wife's presence overseas with her husband – meant that Leavitt would make an attempt to gain custody of his two children. But those attempts were, apparently, in vain, and the two Leavitt children remained with Bryan.

== Fate of the children and later life ==
Ruth Bryan Owen lived abroad for several years during her English husband's postings, until she returned to America, where she ran for Congress from Florida after his early death. She was the first Congresswoman elected from Florida, served as the first woman on the House Foreign Affairs Committee, and later served as the nation's first female Ambassador. While the United States Ambassador to Denmark, a post to which she was appointed by President Franklin D. Roosevelt, Ruth Baird Bryan Leavitt Owen married Danish citizen Capt. Boerge Rohde, Captain of the Royal Life Guards of King Christian X of Denmark, to whose court Ruth Bryan Owen was ambassador. She died in Copenhagen, Denmark, in 1954.

Leavitt's son John Bryan Leavitt later dropped the name Leavitt, and became an actor known as John Bryan. He died in New York City on January 2, 1943. His sister Ruth married investment banker Robert Lehman.

William Homer Leavitt eventually returned to America from Paris and married as his second wife Gertrude (Leeper) Leavitt, daughter of the Rev. Dr. G. Leeper of Cleveland, Ohio. Leavitt lived at his old home in Newport with his wife, who died of appendicitis on April 15, 1914. Leavitt continued to paint and in February 1927 delivered a lecture at the Boston Public Library on The Personal Influence of John Ruskin. Leavitt's death from heart disease was reported in "Deaths Registered in the Town of Winthrop, 1946–1951, pg. 32 as August 8, 1951 in Winthrop, Mass. He was buried in Island Cemetery, Newport, Rhode Island, according to the same document.
