= Smother (disambiguation) =

Smother, smothered or smothering may refer to:

- Asphyxia, caused by obstructing air flow
- Smother (film), a 2008 American film
- Smother (album), a 2011 album by Wild Beasts
- Smothered (2016 film), a film by John Schneider
- Smothered (2025 film), an Indonesian thriller film by Kevin Rahardjo and Rafki Hidayat
- "Smothered" (song), by nu metal band Spineshank
- Smothering (food), a cooking technique associated with Cajun and Louisiana Creole cuisine
- Smother play, a type of endplay in bridge
- Smother (TV series), a 2021 Irish drama series
- Smothered (TV series), a 2023 British comedy series
- An Australian rules football tactic, see One percenter (Australian rules football)#Smother

== See also ==
- Smothered mate, a checkmate in chess
- Smothers, a surname
