= Bill Lantaff =

American politician

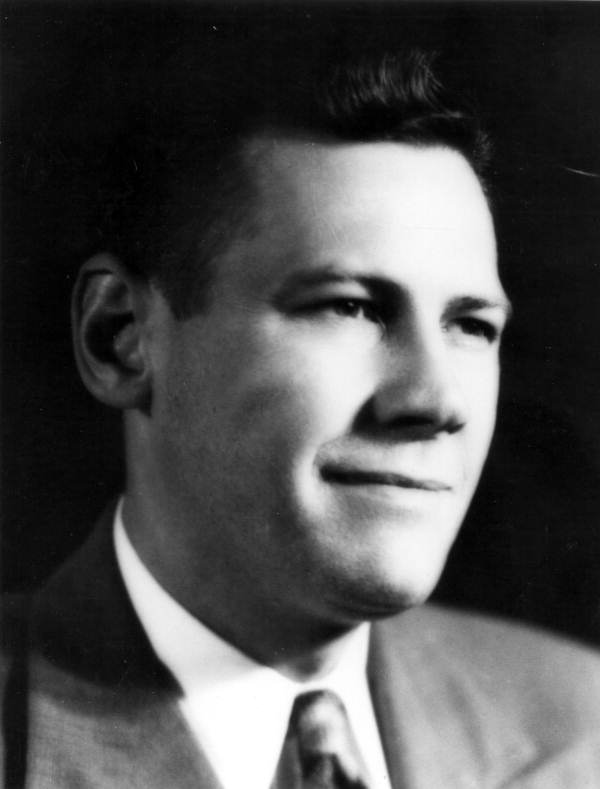

Member of the U.S. House of Representatives from Florida's 4th district
- In office January 3, 1951 – January 3, 1955
- Preceded by: George Smathers
- Succeeded by: Dante Fascell

Member of the Florida House of Representatives
- In office 1947–1950

Personal details
- Born: William Courtland Lantaff; July 31, 1913 Buffalo, New York
- Died: January 28, 1970 (aged 56) Miami, Florida
- Resting place: Caballero Rivero Woodlawn North Park Cemetery and Mausoleum
- Party: Democratic

William Courtland Lantaff (July 31, 1913 – January 28, 1970) was an American lawyer, jurist, and politician who served as a Democratic U.S. representative from Florida for two terms from 1951 to 1955.

He also served as a state court judge in Florida and as a member of the Florida House of Representatives.

== Life and career ==
Lantaff's family moved to Jacksonville, Florida in 1921 and to Miami, Florida in 1929. He graduated from the University of Florida (where he was a member of Phi Kappa Tau fraternity) in 1935 and from the University of Florida College of Law in 1936. He was admitted to the Florida bar in 1937 and practiced law in Miami, serving as assistant city judge of Miami Beach in 1939 and 1940.

He was inducted into the Florida National Guard as a first lieutenant in January 1941 where he served as executive officer for the Military Intelligence Division of the War Department General Staff. He was discharged as a lieutenant colonel in November 1945 but returned to active duty from September through December 1950, while he was running for Congress.

=== Congress ===
In 1950, he was elected to his first of two terms in the U.S. House of Representatives, serving as a Democrat from 1951 to 1955.

He appeared on the January 25, 1953 episode of the panel show What's My Line? as a contestant.

=== Later career ===
Lantaff was a delegate to the 1956 and 1960 Democratic National Conventions. At the conclusion of his political career, he returned to the law and was involved in banking and advertising. In 1967, he became a founding board member of the Dade Community Foundation.

== Death ==
He died in 1970 at the age of 56 and is buried in Woodlawn Park Cemetery and Mausoleum (now Caballero Rivero Woodlawn North Park Cemetery and Mausoleum), Miami.

U.S. House of Representatives
Preceded by George Smathers	United States Representative for the 4th congressional district of Florida; 1951–1955	Succeeded by Dante Fascell
