= J. Mark Wilcox =

American politician (1890–1956)

James Mark Wilcox
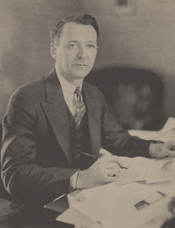

Member of the U.S. House of Representatives from Florida's 4th district
- In office March 4, 1933 – January 3, 1939
- Preceded by: Ruth Bryan Owen
- Succeeded by: Pat Cannon

Personal details
- Born: May 21, 1890 Willacoochee, Georgia, U.S.
- Died: February 3, 1956 (aged 65) White Springs, Florida, U.S.
- Resting place: Woodlawn Park Cemetery, Miami, Florida
- Party: Democratic
- Education: Mercer University

James Mark Wilcox (May 21, 1890 – February 3, 1956) was a U.S. representative from Florida. He is remembered as the author of the Wilcox Municipal Bankruptcy Act, which became law in 1934, a bill which initially allowed a city in his district, West Palm Beach, to adjust its bonded indebtedness and avoid bankruptcy. It was later invoked to help New York City avoid bankruptcy in 1972.

== Early life and career ==
James Mark Wilcox, commonly known by his middle name, was born May 21, 1890, in Willacoochee, Georgia, the second son of Dr. Jefferson Taylor Wilcox and his wife Marian Henson Wilcox. He attended public schools and Emory University. After graduation from Emory, he worked as a teacher before attending law school at Mercer University. He graduated from Mercer in 1910 and was admitted to the bar the same year; he commenced practice in Hazlehurst, Georgia.

Wilcox married the former Lyde Christine Helm (1892–1973) of Birmingham, Alabama, on November 27, 1910. The couple had two sons, James Mark Wilcox, Jr. (1916-2005) and Joel C. Wilcox, Sr. (1918–2009).

Wilcox served as the solicitor of Jeff Davis County, Georgia, from 1911 until 1918. The following year he moved to Brunswick, Georgia, then in 1925 to West Palm Beach, Florida, where he continued to practice law. He served as city attorney of West Palm Beach from 1928 until 1933 and as a member of the taxation committee of President Herbert Hoover's Conference on Home Ownership in 1931.

== Congress ==
Wilcox was elected to Congress in 1932, defeating two-term Congressional representative Ruth Bryan Owen in the June Democratic primary. Wilcox was elected to the Seventy-third, Seventy-fourth, and Seventy-fifth Congresses and served from March 4, 1933, to January 3, 1939.

In Congress authored HR Bill 3151 in 1937 which recommended separating the Air Corps from the Army and making it an independent service. He also authored the Wilcox Municipal Bankruptcy Act which became law in 1934; it allowed West Palm Beach to adjust its bonded indebtedness and avoid bankruptcy. It was later invoked to help New York City avoid bankruptcy in 1972.

=== Run for the U.S. Senate ===
He was not a candidate for Congress in 1938, instead choosing to make a run for the Democratic nomination for United States Senator, a campaign which was ultimately unsuccessful.

=== Views on racial issues ===
In a congressional discussion on the Fair Labor Standards Act of 1937, Wilcox expressed the importance and concern of Southern Democrats in maintaining wage disparities among races. "[T]here is another matter of great importance in the South and that is the problem of our Negro labor. There has always been a difference in the wage scale of white and colored labor. So long as Florida people are permitted to handle the matter, the delicate and perplexing problem can be adjusted; but the Federal Government knows no color line and of necessity, it cannot make any distinction between the races. We may rest assured, therefore, that when we turn over to a federal bureau or board the power to fix wages, it will prescribe the same wages for the Negro that it prescribes for the white man. Now, such a plan might work in some sections of the United States but those of us who know the true situation know that it just will not work in the South. You cannot put the Negro and the white man on the same basis and get away with it."

== Later career and death ==
Following his 1938 electoral defeat Wilcox resumed the practice of law in Miami, Florida. Later, he served as attorney for the Dade County Port Authority/Greater Miami Traffic Association from 1945 until his death at his farm, ChrisMar, in White Springs, Florida, on February 3, 1956.

Wilcox's body was interred in Woodlawn Park Cemetery, Miami, Florida.

== Legacy ==
Wilcox is the namesake of Miami International Airport, the official name of which is J. Mark Wilcox Field.

== Footnotes ==
U.S. House of Representatives
Preceded by Ruth Bryan Owen	Member of the U.S. House of Representatives from Florida's 4th congressional district 1933–1939	Succeeded by Pat Cannon
