= 1956 United States Senate election in Florida =

1956 U.S. Senate Democratic primary in Florida
- May 8, 1956
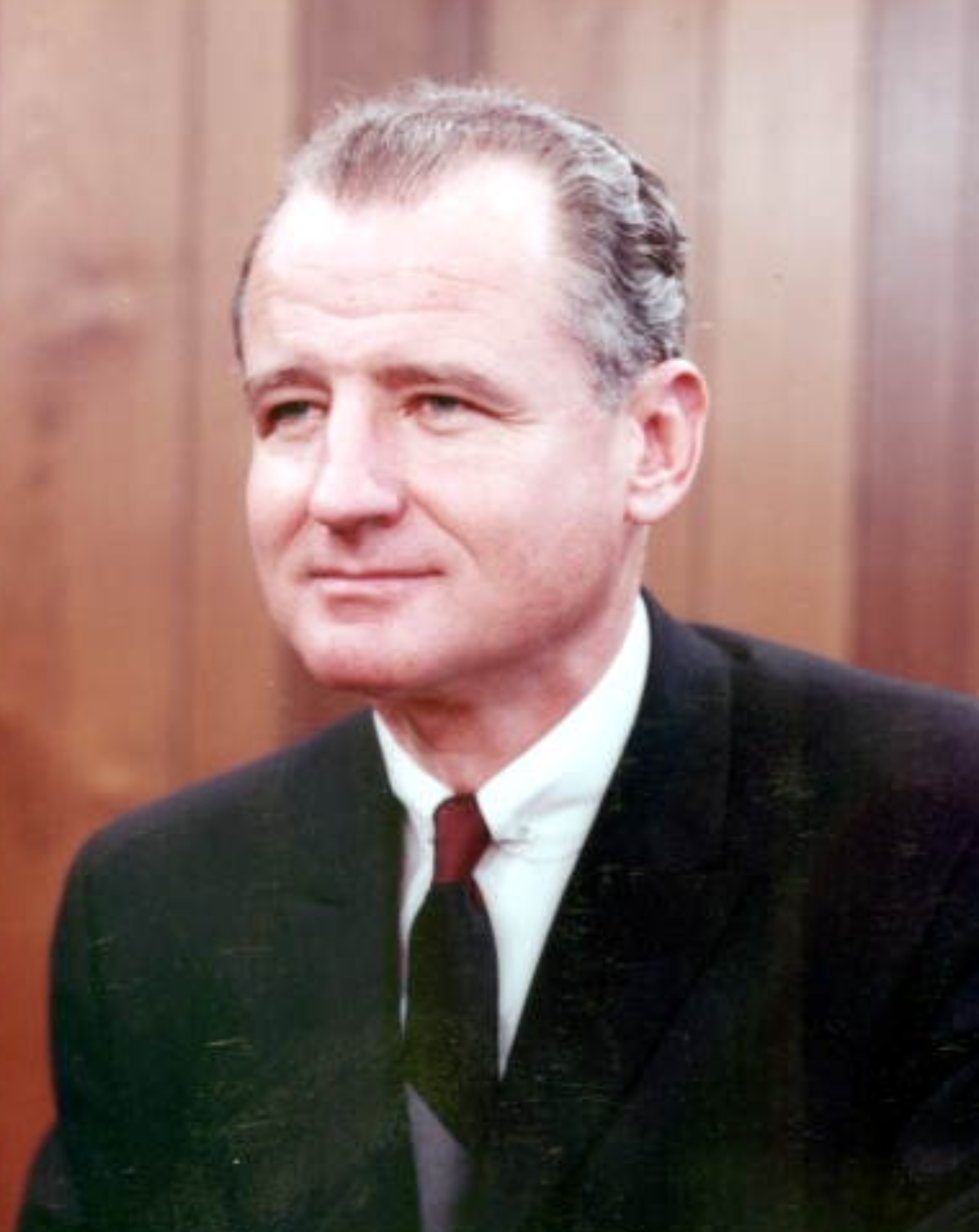

Nominee	George Smathers	Erle Griffis
Party	Democratic	Democratic
Popular vote	614,663	87,525
Percentage	87.5%	12.5%
- County results Smathers: 50–60% 60–70% 70–80% 80–90% >90% Griffis: 50–60% 70–80%
U.S. senator before election
George Smathers
Democratic
Elected U.S. Senator
George Smathers
Democratic

The 1956 United States Senate election in Florida was held on November 6, 1956. Incumbent Democratic U.S. Senator George Smathers won re-election to a second term.

Smathers' victory in the May 8 primary was tantamount to election, as the Republican Party did not field a candidate for this election. This election was the last Senate election in Florida in which the Republicans did not field a candidate.

== Democratic primary ==
=== Candidates ===
- Erle L. Griffis, attorney
- George Smathers, incumbent U.S. Senator

=== Results ===
Democratic Party primary results
Party	Candidate	Votes	%
Democratic	George Smathers (incumbent)	614,663	87.54%
Democratic	Erle L. Griffis	87,525	12.46%
Total votes		702,188	

== General election ==
=== Results ===
County results Smathers: >90%

United States Senate election in Florida, 1956
Party	Candidate	Votes	%	±%
Democratic	George Smathers (incumbent)	655,418	100.00%	
Total votes		655,418	100.00%	
Democratic hold				

== See also ==
- 1956 United States Senate elections

== Bibliography ==
- Guide to U.S. Elections. Vol. II. Washington, DC: CQ Press. 2005. ISBN 1-56802-981-0.
