= Florida's 4th congressional district =

U.S. House district for Florida

Coordinates: 30°25′35″N 81°51′51″W

- Map of district boundaries since January 3, 2023 (Note: The district includes the same census blocks as drawn for the 2020 redistricting cycle in 2022 and during mid-decade redistricting in 2026. As such, boundaries of the district will not change at the 2026 elections.) (Interactive map version)
- Representative: Aaron Bean; R–Fernandina Beach
- Area: 1,962 mi^{2} (5,080 km^{2})
- Distribution: 87.4% urban; 12.6% rural
- Population (2025): 855,470
- Median household income: $75,534
- Ethnicity: 52.1% White; 31.1% Black; 8.8% Hispanic; 4.5% Two or more races; 2.5% Asian; 0.9% other
- Cook PVI: R+5

Florida's 4th congressional district is a congressional district in northeastern Florida, encompassing Nassau and Clay counties and Duval County west of the St. Johns River, including Downtown Jacksonville. The district is currently represented by Aaron Bean of the Republican Party.

As part of the 2020 redistricting cycle, the district was redrawn to include Clay County and exclude St. Johns County. Rutherford was redistricted into the 5th district, and Republican state senator Aaron Bean was elected to be the district's representative in the 2022 election.

Before 1993, most of the territory now in the 4th district was the 3rd district, represented by Charles Edward Bennett, a Democrat. He had held the seat and its predecessors since 1949 and was facing a stiff reelection contest against Republican Tillie Fowler in the 1992 election. Bennett retired after his wife fell ill, and Fowler easily defeated an underfunded replacement candidate. She became the first Republican woman to represent the district.

From 1967 to 1993, the 4th district stretched from the southern Jacksonville suburbs to the northern Orlando suburbs. Much of this area became the 7th district after redistricting, and is now the 6th district.

== Voting ==
=== Recent election results from statewide races ===
Year	Office	Results
2008	President	McCain 53% - 46%
2010	Senate	Rubio 54% - 27%
2010	Governor	Scott 56% - 44%
2010	Attorney General	Bondi 56% - 38%
2010	Chief Financial Officer	Atwater 56% - 37%
2012	President	Romney 54% - 46%
2012	Senate	Nelson 52% - 48%
2014	Governor	Scott 59% - 41%
2016	President	Trump 53% - 43%
2016	Senate	Rubio 59% - 37%
2018	Senate	Scott 53% - 46%
2018	Governor	DeSantis 52% - 47%
2018	Attorney General	Moody 55% - 44%
2018	Chief Financial Officer	Patronis 55% - 45%
2020	President	Trump 53% - 46%
2022	Senate	Rubio 59% - 40%
2022	Governor	DeSantis 60% - 39%
2022	Attorney General	Moody 62% - 38%
2022	Chief Financial Officer	Patronis 61% - 39%
2024	President	Trump 55% - 44%
2024	Senate	Scott 55% - 43%

=== Voter registration ===
Voter Registration and Party Enrollment as of February 20, 2024
Party	Voters	Percentage
Republican	209,858	40.70%
Democratic	186,958	36.26%
No Party Affiliation	105,509	20.46%

== Composition ==
For the 118th and successive Congresses (based on redistricting following the 2020 census), the district contains all or portions of the following counties and communities:

Clay County (11)

All 11 communities

Duval County (2)

Baldwin, Jacksonville (part; also 5th)

Nassau County (5)

All 5 communities

== List of members representing the district ==
Member	Party	Years	Cong ress	Electoral history	
District created March 4, 1915
William J. Sears (Kissimmee)	Democratic	March 4, 1915 – March 3, 1929	64th 65th 66th 67th 68th 69th 70th	Elected in 1914. Re-elected in 1916. Re-elected in 1918. Re-elected in 1920. Re-elected in 1922. Re-elected in 1924. Re-elected in 1926. Lost renomination.	
Ruth Bryan Owen (Miami)	Democratic	March 4, 1929 – March 3, 1933	71st 72nd	Elected in 1928. Re-elected in 1930. Lost renomination.	
J. Mark Wilcox (West Palm Beach)	Democratic	March 4, 1933 – January 3, 1939	73rd 74th 75th	Elected in 1932. Re-elected in 1934. Re-elected in 1936. Retired to run for U.S. Senate.	
Pat Cannon (Miami)	Democratic	January 3, 1939 – January 3, 1947	76th 77th 78th 79th	Elected in 1938. Re-elected in 1940. Re-elected in 1942. Re-elected in 1944; Lost renomination.	
George Smathers (Miami)	Democratic	January 3, 1947 – January 3, 1951	80th 81st	Elected in 1946. Re-elected in 1948. Retired to run for U.S. Senate.	
Bill Lantaff (Miami Springs)	Democratic	January 3, 1951 – January 3, 1955	82nd 83rd	Elected in 1950. Re-elected in 1952. Retired.	
Dante Fascell (Miami)	Democratic	January 3, 1955 – January 3, 1967	84th 85th 86th 87th 88th 89th	Elected in 1954. Re-elected in 1956. Re-elected in 1958. Re-elected in 1960. Re-elected in 1962. Re-elected in 1964. Redistricted to the 12th district.	
Syd Herlong (Leesburg)	Democratic	January 3, 1967 – January 3, 1969	90th	Redistricted from the 5th district and re-elected in 1966. Retired.	
Bill Chappell (Ormond Beach)	Democratic	January 3, 1969 – January 3, 1989	91st 92nd 93rd 94th 95th 96th 97th 98th 99th 100th	Elected in 1968. Re-elected in 1970. Re-elected in 1972. Re-elected in 1974. Re-elected in 1976. Re-elected in 1978. Re-elected in 1980. Re-elected in 1982. Re-elected in 1984. Re-elected in 1986. Lost re-election.	
Craig James (DeLand)	Republican	January 3, 1989 – January 3, 1993	101st 102nd	Elected in 1988. Re-elected in 1990. Retired.	
Tillie Fowler (Jacksonville)	Republican	January 3, 1993 – January 3, 2001	103rd 104th 105th 106th	Elected in 1992. Re-elected in 1994. Re-elected in 1996. Re-elected in 1998. Retired.	1993–2003 [data missing]
Ander Crenshaw (Jacksonville)	Republican	January 3, 2001 – January 3, 2017	107th 108th 109th 110th 111th 112th 113th 114th	Elected in 2000. Re-elected in 2002. Re-elected in 2004. Re-elected in 2006. Re-elected in 2008. Re-elected in 2010. Re-elected in 2012. Re-elected in 2014. Retired.	1993–2003 [data missing]
Ander Crenshaw (Jacksonville)	Republican	January 3, 2001 – January 3, 2017	107th 108th 109th 110th 111th 112th 113th 114th	Elected in 2000. Re-elected in 2002. Re-elected in 2004. Re-elected in 2006. Re-elected in 2008. Re-elected in 2010. Re-elected in 2012. Re-elected in 2014. Retired.	2003–2013
Ander Crenshaw (Jacksonville)	Republican	January 3, 2001 – January 3, 2017	107th 108th 109th 110th 111th 112th 113th 114th	Elected in 2000. Re-elected in 2002. Re-elected in 2004. Re-elected in 2006. Re-elected in 2008. Re-elected in 2010. Re-elected in 2012. Re-elected in 2014. Retired.	2013–2017
John Rutherford (Jacksonville)	Republican	January 3, 2017 – January 3, 2023	115th 116th 117th	Elected in 2016. Re-elected in 2018. Re-elected in 2020. Redistricted to the 5th district.	2017–2023
Aaron Bean (Fernandina Beach)	Republican	January 3, 2023 – present	118th 119th	Elected in 2022. Re-elected in 2024. Re-elected in 2026.	2023–present

== Election results ==
=== 2002 ===
Florida's 4th Congressional District Election (2002)
Party	Candidate	Votes	%
Republican	Ander Crenshaw (incumbent)	171,152	99.70
No party	Others	509	0.30
Total votes		171,661	100.00
Republican hold			

=== 2004 ===
Florida's 4th Congressional District Election (2004)
Party	Candidate	Votes	%
Republican	Ander Crenshaw*	256,157	99.55
No party	Richard Grayson	1,170	0.45
Total votes		257,327	100.00
Republican hold			

=== 2006 ===
Florida's 4th Congressional District Election (2006)
Party	Candidate	Votes	%
Republican	Ander Crenshaw* (incumbent)	141,759	69.67
Democratic	Robert Harms	61,704	30.33
Total votes		203,463	100.00
Republican hold			

=== 2008 ===
Florida's 4th Congressional District Election (2008)
Party	Candidate	Votes	%
Republican	Ander Crenshaw*	224,112	65.26
Democratic	Jay McGovern	119,330	34.74
Total votes		343,442	100.00
Republican hold			

=== 2010 ===
Florida's 4th Congressional District Election (2010)
Party	Candidate	Votes	%
Republican	Ander Crenshaw*	178,238	77.21
Independent	Troy Dwayne Stanley	52,540	22.76
No party	Others	67	0.03
Total votes		230,845	100.00
Republican hold			

=== 2012 ===
Florida's 4th Congressional District Election (2012)
Party	Candidate	Votes	%
Republican	Ander Crenshaw*	239,988	76.07
Independent	James Klauder	75,236	23.85
Independent	Gary Koniz	246	0.08
Total votes		315,470	100.00
Republican hold			

=== 2014 ===
Florida's 4th Congressional District Election (2014)
Party	Candidate	Votes	%
Republican	Ander Crenshaw*	177,887	78.28
Independent	Paula Moser-Bartlett	35,663	15.69
Independent	Gary Koniz	13,690	6.02
No party	Deborah Katz Pueschel	13	0.01
Total votes		227,253	100.00
Republican hold			

=== 2016 ===
Florida's 4th Congressional District Election (2016)
Party	Candidate	Votes	%
Republican	John Rutherford	287,509	70.18
Democratic	David Bruderly	113,088	27.61
Independent	Gary Koniz	9,054	2.21
No party	Others	11	0.00
Total votes		409,662	100.00
Republican hold			

=== 2018 ===
Florida's 4th Congressional District Election (2018)
Party	Candidate	Votes	%
Republican	John Rutherford (incumbent)	248,420	65.16
Democratic	Ges Selmont	123,351	32.35
Independent	Joceline Berrios	7,155	1.88
Independent	Jason Bulger	2,321	0.61
Write-in		2	<0.01
Total votes		381,249	100.00
Republican hold			

=== 2020 ===
2020 United States House of Representatives elections in Florida
Party	Candidate	Votes	%
Republican	John Rutherford (incumbent)	308,497	61.10%
Democratic	Donna Deegan	196,423	38.90%
Independent	Gary Koniz (write-in)	20	0.00%
Total votes		504,940	100.0
Republican hold			

=== 2022 ===
2022 United States House of Representatives elections in Florida
Party	Candidate	Votes	%
Republican	Aaron Bean	165,696	60.45%
Democratic	LaShonda Holloway	108,402	39.55%
Independent	Gary Koniz (write-in)	5	<0.01%
Total votes		274,103	100.0
Republican hold			

=== 2024 ===
2024 United States House of Representatives elections in Florida
Party	Candidate	Votes	%
Republican	Aaron Bean	222,364	57.26%
Democratic	LaShonda Holloway	165,912	42.72%
Independent	Todd Schaefer (write-in)	73	0.02%
Total votes		388,349	100.0
Republican hold			
