= Ruth Bryan Owen =

American politician (1885–1954)

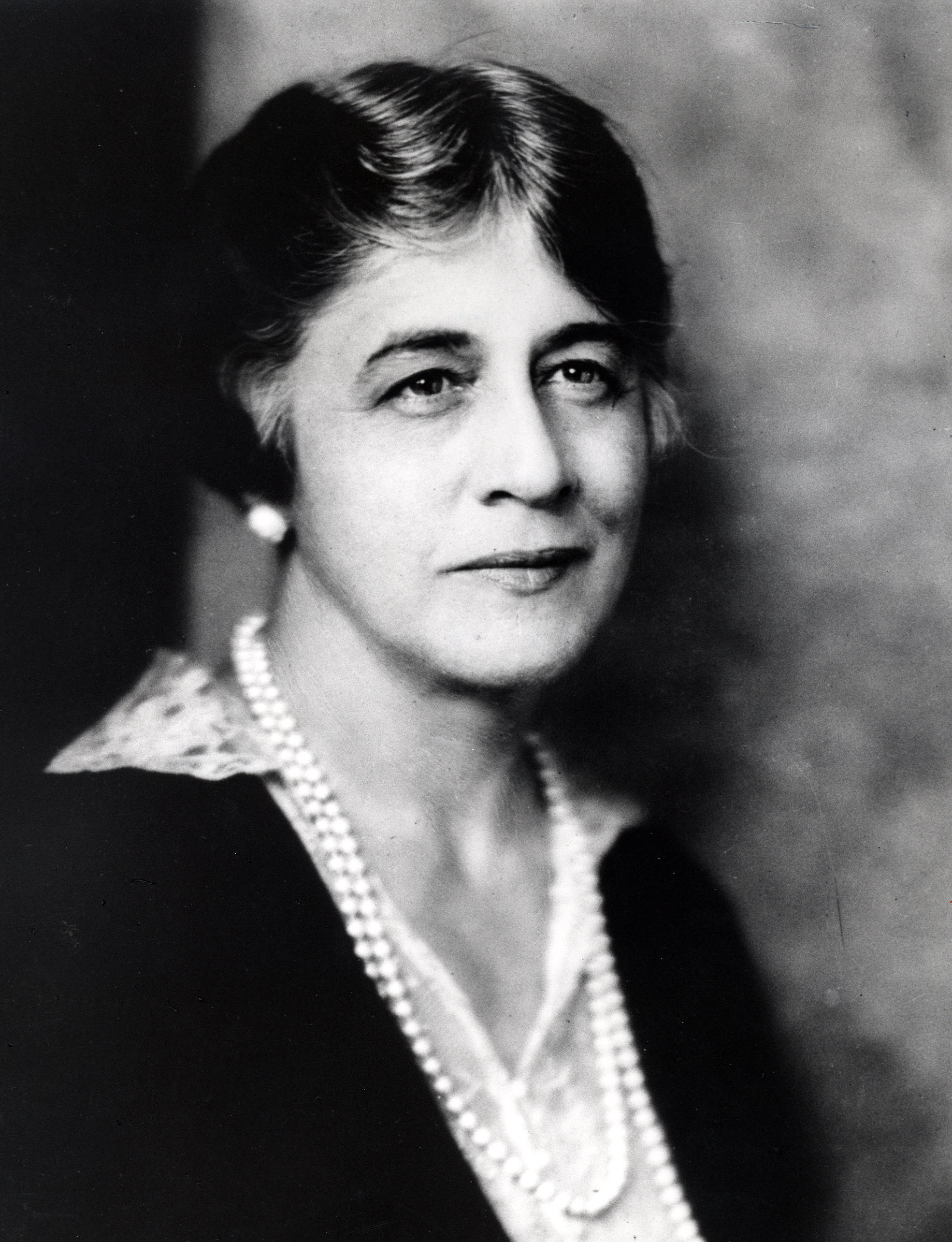

United States Ambassador to Denmark
- In office May 29, 1933 – June 27, 1936
- President: Franklin D. Roosevelt
- Preceded by: Frederick W. B. Coleman
- Succeeded by: Alvin M. Owsley

Member of the U.S. House of Representatives from Florida's 4th district
- In office March 4, 1929 – March 3, 1933
- Preceded by: William J. Sears
- Succeeded by: J. Mark Wilcox

Personal details
- Born: Ruth Baird Bryan; October 2, 1885 Jacksonville, Illinois, U.S.
- Died: July 26, 1954 (aged 68) Copenhagen, Denmark
- Resting place: Ordrup Cemetery, Copenhagen
- Party: Democratic
- Spouses: William Homer Leavitt (m. 1903; div. 1909) Reginald Altham Owen (m. 1910; died 1927) Børge Rohde (m. 1936)
- Parent(s): William Jennings Bryan; Mary E. Baird
- Relatives: William Jennings Bryan Jr. (brother)
- Profession: Politician, diplomat, author

Ruth Baird Leavitt Owen Rohde (née Bryan; October 2, 1885 – July 26, 1954), also known as Ruth Bryan Owen, was an American politician and diplomat who represented Florida's 4th congressional district in the United States House of Representatives from 1929 to 1933 and served as United States Envoy to Denmark from 1933 to 1936. She was the first woman elected to Congress from Florida and just the second woman ever elected to the House from the American South, after Alice Mary Robertson of Oklahoma. Owen became the first woman to earn a seat on the House Committee on Foreign Affairs. A member of the Democratic Party, she was the first female chief of mission at the minister rank in U.S. diplomatic history under President Franklin D. Roosevelt.

== Biography ==
=== Early years ===
Ruth Baird Bryan was born on October 2, 1885, in Jacksonville, Illinois, to William Jennings Bryan and his wife, the former Mary E. Baird. Her father was a congressman and three-time Democratic presidential nominee and her grandfather, Silas Bryan was a judge and legislator. Growing up, Ruth Bryan had to move several times depending on her father's work in politics. She attended public schools in Washington, D.C., and the Monticello Female Academy in Godfrey, Illinois. In 1901 she began to take classes at the University of Nebraska.

In 1903 she dropped out of the University of Nebraska to marry William H. Leavitt, a well-known Newport, Rhode Island, portrait painter. The couple met when he was painting a portrait of Bryan's father. The couple had two children before divorcing in 1909.

Bryan married Reginald Owen, a British Army officer, in 1910, and had two more children with him. Her second husband died in 1928. She spent three years in Oracabessa, Jamaica, where she oversaw the design and construction of her home, Golden Clouds. It is now operated as a luxury villa. Owen kept her home in Jamaica for more than three decades and spent many winters there, particularly in later years when she lived in Denmark and New York City. She detailed her time in Jamaica and experiences at Golden Clouds in a book, Caribbean Caravel.

During World War I, Ruth Owen served as a war nurse in the Voluntary Aid Detachment in the Egypt–Palestine campaign, 1915–1918. She also served as a secretary for the American Women's War Relief Fund.

=== Filmmaking career ===
Ruth Bryan Owen was a female pioneer in the film industry. She was a director, producer, and screenwriter for a feature film in 1922, called Once Upon a Time/Scheherazade, which is now considered lost. In the spring of 1921, she started production of Once Upon a Time. The film featured the Community Players of Coconut Grove, Florida, and was not related to a major studio at the time.

The storyline was said to revolve around a shah dethroned by his jealous subordinate, who in turn uses his new power to torture young women who do not amuse him. Towards the end, the sadistic ruler runs into the most beautiful one of all, and the exiled shah returns just in time to save the young woman from his nemesis. According to the Moving Picture World, the costuming was ornate and elaborately done, the staging was complicated, and the mise-en-scène evoked an "atmosphere of experience in the Far East". Owen had done extensive traveling, and visited countries such as India, Burma, Sri Lanka, China and Japan. Inspired by these places, she used them as the backdrop for her film.

Little would be known about the film except that Owen discussed it in correspondence with Carrie Dunlap, a friend from Illinois who served as campaign treasurer for Owen's father. In her letters to Dunlap, Owen expresses great joy in her film, quoting, "I can scarcely believe the film is mine when I see it 'projected' on the wall above our fireplace."

She thought of herself as a true pioneer in the industry. Her correspondence with Dunlap also revealed her intent to become one of the first female filmmakers in the U.S. Owen funded the film solely from her earnings on the public speaking circuit. In her letters, Owen discussed the support she gained from the General Federation of Women's Clubs, and their contribution to help secure a distribution deal with the Society for Visual Education.

=== Political career ===
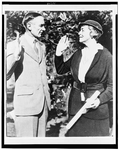
Bryan Owen takes the oath of office as U.S. envoy to Denmark, 1933

Owen first ran for office in 1926 for the Democratic nomination for Florida's 4th congressional district. It was a year after the death of her father. It then included nearly the entire east coast of the state from Jacksonville to the Florida Keys: with Miami, Orlando and St. Augustine. She lost the primary by fewer than 800 votes to incumbent William J. Sears.

From 1925 to 1928, she was an administrator at the University of Miami.

In 1928, after the death of her husband, Owen ran again. Having played a significant role when a hurricane hit Miami in 1927 and put efforts into promotions in newspapers, she defeated Sears by more than 14,000 votes and began her term of office on March 4, 1929, while a widow and mother of four. Her election was contested on the grounds that she had lost her citizenship by marrying an alien. By the Cable Act in 1922, she could petition for her citizenship, which she did in 1925, less than the seven years required by the Constitution. She argued her case before the House Committee on Elections, saying that no American man had ever lost his citizenship by marriage. She said that she lost her citizenship because she was a woman, not because of her marital status. The U.S. House of Representatives voted in her favor.

Owen ran for re-election in 1930, defeating Daytona Beach attorney Dewitt T. Deen by a wide margin in the June Democratic primary. As the Republicans did not nominate a candidate to run in the 4th District, the pro-Prohibition Owen was heralded in the press as presumably having won re-election by virtue of her Democratic nomination.

Owen's second term would prove to be her last, however, as in the 1932 Democratic primary, she was defeated by J. Mark Wilcox, who advocated the repeal of Prohibition. Her congressional career thus came to an end on March 4, 1933.

=== First female U.S. ambassador ===
From 1933 to 1936, Owen served as United States Ambassador to Denmark, appointed by President Franklin D. Roosevelt. She would become the first woman to represent the United States in a foreign country as part of a diplomatic delegation. While serving in her position in Denmark, one of her primary goals was to restore Danish-American relations, which had been damaged by the Smoot–Hawley Tariff Act.

On July 11, 1936, she married Børge Rohde, a Danish Captain of the King's Guard. The wedding took place at the estate of President Roosevelt and Eleanor Roosevelt in Hyde Park, New York. Fannie Hurst, noted novelist and close friend of the bride, was matron of honor. Owen announced that she would retain her own name in her diplomatic and literary careers. The marriage gave her dual citizenship as a Dane—in addition to that of the United States—so she resigned her ambassadorial post in September.

She served as a delegate to the 1945 San Francisco Conference, which established the United Nations after World War II. In 1948, President Harry S. Truman named her an alternate delegate to the U.N. General Assembly.

=== Later years ===
In 1939, Ruth Bryan Owen and her husband purchased "The Cedars", in Alderson, West Virginia, and began making repairs. They sold the property in 1945. It was listed on the National Register of Historic Places in 1978.

=== Death and burial ===
While in Denmark to accept the Danish Medal of Merit, she died of a heart attack in Copenhagen on July 26, 1954. She was cremated, with her ashes being interred at Ordrup Cemetery, Copenhagen.

== Legacy ==
In 1992, Owen was inducted into the Florida Women's Hall of Fame.

In 2008, Chief Financial Officer of Florida Alex Sink founded Ruth's List Florida, which was named in her honor, and aimed at electing more women to public office.

== Works ==
- Elements of Public Speaking New York, H. Liveright, 1931.
- Leaves from a Greenland Diary New York: Dodd, Mead & Co., 1935.
- Denmark Caravan New York: Dodd, Mead & Co., 1936.
- Picture Tales from Scandinavia Philadelphia: J. B. Lippincott Co., 1939.
- The Castle in the Silver Wood and Other Scandinavian Fairy Tales New York: Dodd, Mead & Co., 1939.
- Look Forward, Warrior New York: Dodd, Mead & Co., 1942.
- Caribbean Caravel New York: Dodd, Mead & Co., 1949.

== Filmography ==
- Once Upon A Time.

== See also ==
- Women in the United States House of Representatives

U.S. House of Representatives
| Preceded by William J. Sears | Member of the U.S. House of Representatives from Florida's 4th congressional district 1929–1933 | Succeeded by J. Mark Wilcox |
Diplomatic posts
| Preceded by Frederick W. B. Coleman | U.S. Ambassador to Denmark; 1933–1936 | Succeeded by Alvin M. Owsley |
