= Smothers =

Smothers is a surname. Notable people with the surname include:

== People ==
- Clay Smothers (1935–2004), African-American member of the Texas House of Representatives 1977–81
- Dick Smothers (born 1938), American comedian, composer and musician, one half of the Smothers Brothers, father of Dick Smothers, Jr.
- Hollywood Smothers (born 2005), American football running back
- Howard Smothers (born 1973), American football offensive lineman
- Jessie Belle Smothers (AKA Jessie Belle McCoy, born 1985), American model, professional wrestling valet, and professional wrestler
- Joseph Smothers (fl. 1870s), Baptist minister and state legislator in Mississippi
- Little Smokey Smothers (1939–2010), American blues guitarist and singer, younger brother of Otis "Big Smokey" Smothers
- Logan Smothers (born 2000), American football player
- Otis "Big Smokey" Smothers (1929–1993), American blues guitarist and singer, elder brother of Little Smokey Smothers
- Smothers Brothers, American double act consisting of Dick and Tom Smothers
- Tom Smothers (1937–2023), American comedian, composer and musician, one half of the Smothers Brothers
- Tracy Smothers (1962–2020), American professional wrestler

== See also ==
- Smother (disambiguation)
