= William J. Sears =

American politician

William Joseph Sears
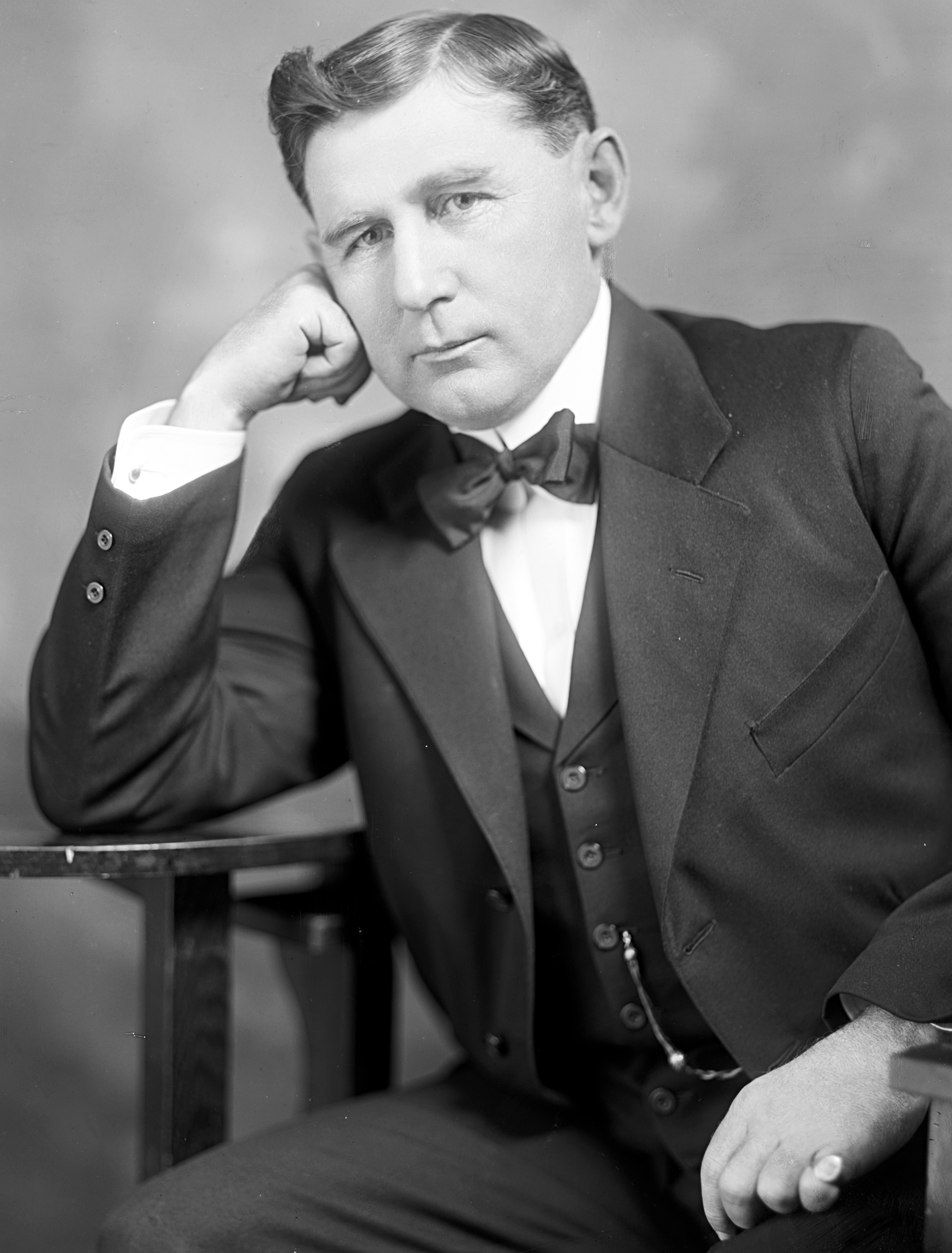

Member of the U.S. House of Representatives from Florida
- In office March 4, 1915 – March 3, 1929
- Preceded by: District created
- Succeeded by: Ruth Bryan Owen
- Constituency: 4th district
- In office March 4, 1933 – January 3, 1937
- Preceded by: Seat inactive
- Succeeded by: Seat inactive
- Constituency: At-large

Personal details
- Born: December 4, 1874 Smithville, Georgia, U.S.
- Died: March 30, 1944 (aged 69) Kissimmee, Florida, U.S.
- Resting place: Rose Hill Cemetery
- Party: Democratic

William Joseph Sears (December 4, 1874 – March 30, 1944) was a lawyer and U.S. Representative from Florida. A Democrat, he was an avowed white supremacist.

== Early life and education ==
Born in Smithville, Georgia, Sears moved with his parents to Ellaville, Georgia, and thence to Kissimmee, Florida, in January 1881. He attended the public schools. He graduated from Florida State College at Lake City in 1895 and from Mercer University in Macon, Georgia, in 1896.

He studied law and was admitted to the bar in 1905. He commenced his law practice in Kissimmee, and served as its mayor from 1907 to 1911. He was also the superintendent of public instruction of Osceola County 1905–1915.

== Congress ==
Sears was elected as a Democrat to the Sixty-fourth and to the six succeeding Congresses (March 4, 1915 – March 3, 1929). He served as chairman of the Committee on Education (Sixty-fifth Congress). He was an unsuccessful candidate for renomination in 1928 and resumed the practice of his legal profession in Kissimmee. He moved to Jacksonville, Florida, and continued the practice of law.

Sears was again elected to the U.S. House for the Seventy-third and Seventy-fourth Congresses (March 4, 1933 – January 3, 1937), holding an at-large seat. He was an unsuccessful candidate for renomination in 1936, in a newly drawn district.

== Later career and death ==
Sears served as an associate member of the Board of Veterans' Appeals of the Veterans' Administration in Washington, D.C., from 1937 until his retirement in October 1942. He died in Kissimmee on March 30, 1944, and was interred in Rose Hill Cemetery.

U.S. House of Representatives
Preceded by District created	Member of the U.S. House of Representatives from Florida's 4th congressional district 1915 – 1929	Succeeded by Ruth Bryan Owen
Preceded by Seat inactive	Member of the U.S. House of Representatives from Florida's at-large congressional district 1933 – 1937	Succeeded by Seat inactive
