= Pat Cannon =

American politician (1904–1966)

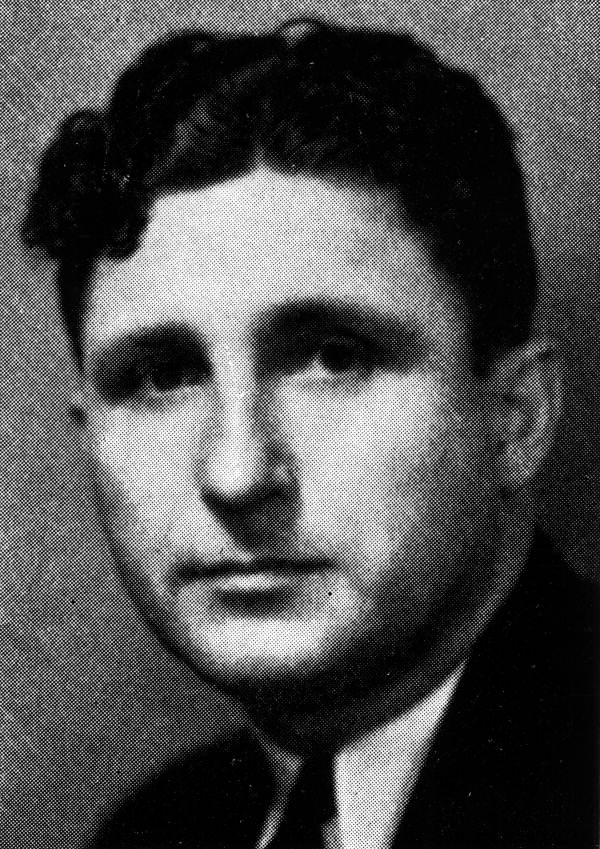

Member of the U.S. House of Representatives from Florida's 4th district
- In office January 3, 1939 – January 3, 1947
- Preceded by: J. Mark Wilcox
- Succeeded by: George Smathers

Personal details
- Party: Democratic

Arthur Patrick Cannon (May 22, 1904 – January 23, 1966) was a four-term United States representative from Florida, serving from 1939 to 1947.

== Early life and education ==
Cannon was born in Powder Springs, Georgia and later moved to Laurens County, South Carolina where he attended the public schools. On the post-secondary level, he attended Wofford College, Stetson University, and graduated from the University of Miami School of Law in 1931. He was admitted to the bar in 1931, and commenced the practice of law in Miami, Florida.

== Congress ==
Cannon was elected as a Democrat to Florida's 4th District in the United States House of Representatives for the Seventy-sixth Congress, and to the three succeeding sessions of the United States Congress (January 3, 1939 – January 3, 1947). He was an unsuccessful candidate for renomination in 1946, losing the election to future U.S. Senator George Smathers.

== Later career and death ==
After leaving Congress, Cannon resumed the practice of law and was elected circuit judge of Dade County, Florida in 1952. He was reelected in 1954 and in 1960 to six-year terms.

Cannon was a resident of Miami, Florida until his death in Miami on January 23, 1966.

U.S. House of Representatives
Preceded by J. Mark Wilcox	Member of the U.S. House of Representatives from Florida's 4th congressional district 1939-1947	Succeeded by George Smathers
