= 1962 United States Senate election in Florida =

- November 6, 1962
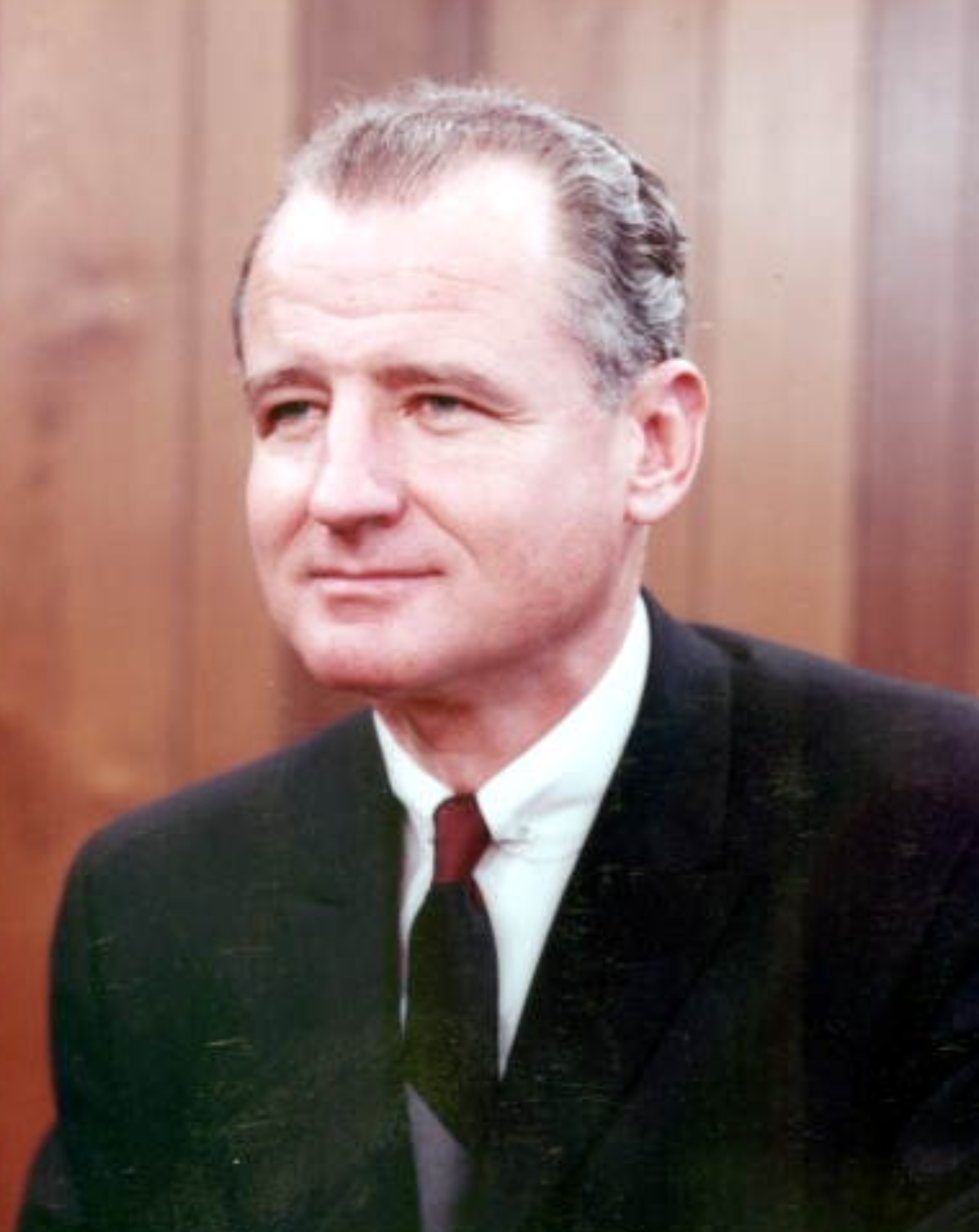

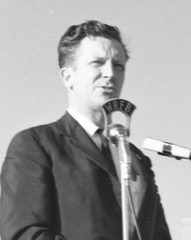
| Nominee | George Smathers | Emerson Rupert |
| Party | Democratic | Republican |
| Popular vote | 657,633 | 281,381 |
| Percentage | 70.02% | 29.96% |
- County results Smathers: 50–60% 60–70% 70–80% 80–90% >90%
U.S. senator before election
George Smathers
Democratic
Elected U.S. Senator
George Smathers
Democratic

The 1962 United States Senate election in Florida took place on November 6, 1962. Incumbent Democratic Senator George Smathers won re-election to a third term. To date, this is the last time that a winning United States Senate candidate carried all counties in Florida for the Class 3 Senate seat from Florida, and the last time a winning United States Senate candidate carried all counties in Florida for a Senate seat from Florida until 1994.

== Primary elections ==
Primary elections were held on May 8, 1962.

=== Democratic primary ===
==== Candidates ====
- Roger L. Davis, lawyer
- George Smathers, incumbent U.S. Senator
- Douglas Randolph Voorhees, real estate salesman

20.5% of the voting age population participated in the Democratic primary.

==== Results ====
Democratic primary results
| Party | Candidate | Votes | % |
|---|---|---|---|
| Democratic | George Smathers (incumbent) | 587,562 | 84.18 |
| Democratic | Roger L. Davis | 74.565 | 10.68 |
| Democratic | Douglas Randolph Voorhees | 35,832 | 5.13 |
| Total votes | | 697,959 | |

=== Republican primary ===
==== Candidates ====
- Emerson H. Rupert, businessman, unsuccessful candidate for Republican nomination for Governor in 1960

==== Results ====
Republican primary results
| Party | Candidate | Votes | % |
|---|---|---|---|
| Republican | Emerson H. Rupert | unopposed | |

== General election ==
=== Results ===
1962 United States Senate election in Florida
| Party | Candidate | Votes | % |
|---|---|---|---|
| Democratic | George Smathers (Incumbent) | 657,633 | 70.02 |
| Republican | Emerson Rupert | 281,381 | 29.96 |
| None | Scattering | 193 | 0.02 |
| Majority | | 376,252 | 40.06 |
| Turnout | | 939,207 | |
| Democratic hold | | | |

== See also ==
- 1962 United States Senate elections

== Works cited ==
- Congressional Elections, 1946-1996. Washington, D.C.: Congressional Quarterly Inc. 1998. ISBN 1-56802-248-4.
- Adams, Tom (1963). Biennial Report of the Secretary of State of the State of Florida for the Period Beginning January 1, 1961 and Ending December 31, 1962. Tallahassee: Office of the Secretary of State for Florida.
- Scammon, Richard M., ed. (1964). America Votes 5: a handbook of contemporary American election statistics, 1962. Washington, D.C.: Governmental Affairs Institute.
- Steed, Robert; Moreland, Laurence; Baker, Tod, eds. (1980). Party Politics in the South. Praeger Publishers. ISBN 0030565863.
