= Transportation Act of 1958 =

American law

- Long title: An Act to amend the Interstate Commerce Act, as amended, so as to strengthen and improve the national transportation system, and for other purposes.
- Enacted by: the 85th United States Congress

Citations
- Public law: Pub. L. 85-625
- Statutes at Large: 72 Stat. 568

Legislative history
- Introduced in the Senate as S. 3778 by George Smathers on May 8, 1958; Signed into law by President Dwight D. Eisenhower on August 12, 1958

The Transportation Act of 1958 (Pub. L. 85–625) attempted to reinvigorate the commercial railroads of the United States by granting the Interstate Commerce Commission money to loan to railroads and power to fix prices. Despite this, railroads were still having a difficult time remaining profitable, and asked to shed services, particularly passenger rail services.
