= Smathers Beach =

Beach in Key West, Florida, United States

Coordinates: 24.551193°N 81.771798°W

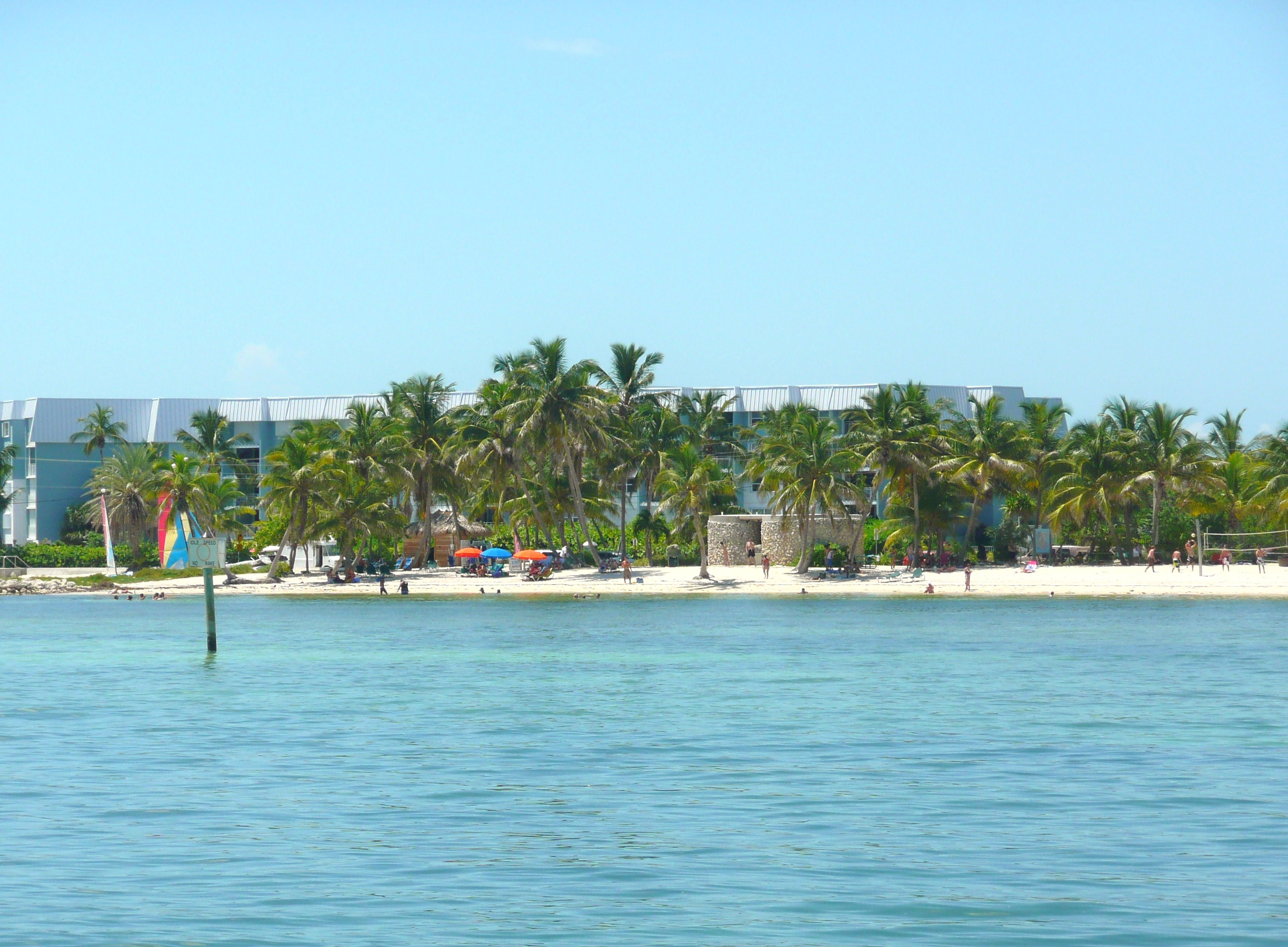
Typical summer day on Smathers Beach.

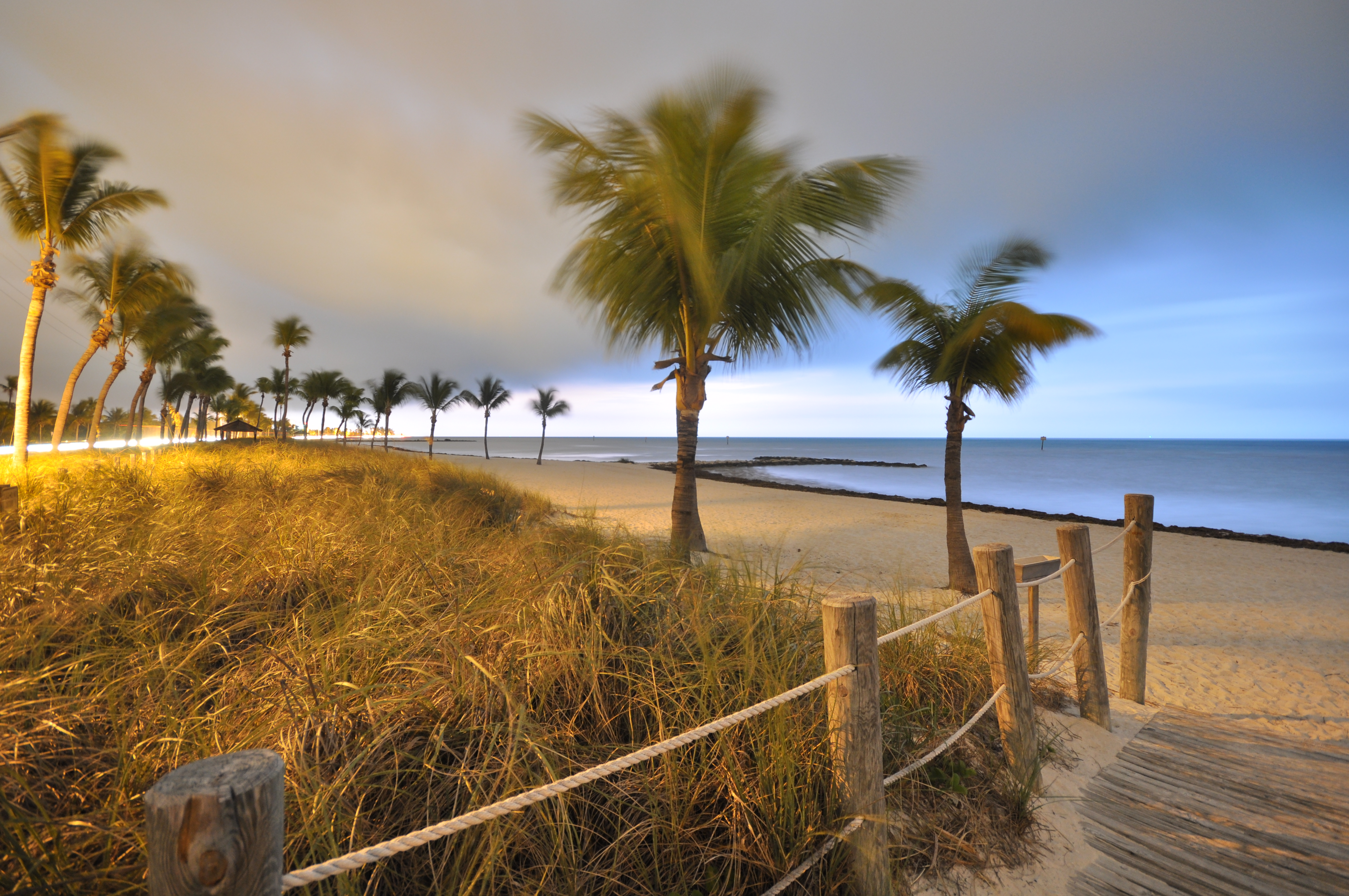
Early morning on Smathers Beach

Smathers Beach is the largest public beach in Key West, Florida, United States. It is approximately a half mile long.

The beach is located on the south side of the island, along the Atlantic Ocean and State Road A1A, and begins at mile marker zero, the beginning of A1A. The beach is lined with coconut trees and is often crowded with tourists and locals alike.

On September 2, 2013, long-distance swimmer Diana Nyad arrived on Smathers Beach after swimming 110 miles (166 kilometers) from Havana, Cuba. It was the first time a person had ever swum from Cuba to Florida without a shark cage.

Smathers Beach is named after George Smathers (1913–2007), a U.S. Senator for Florida and friend of President John F. Kennedy.
