= George Smathers =

American lawyer and politician (1913–2007)

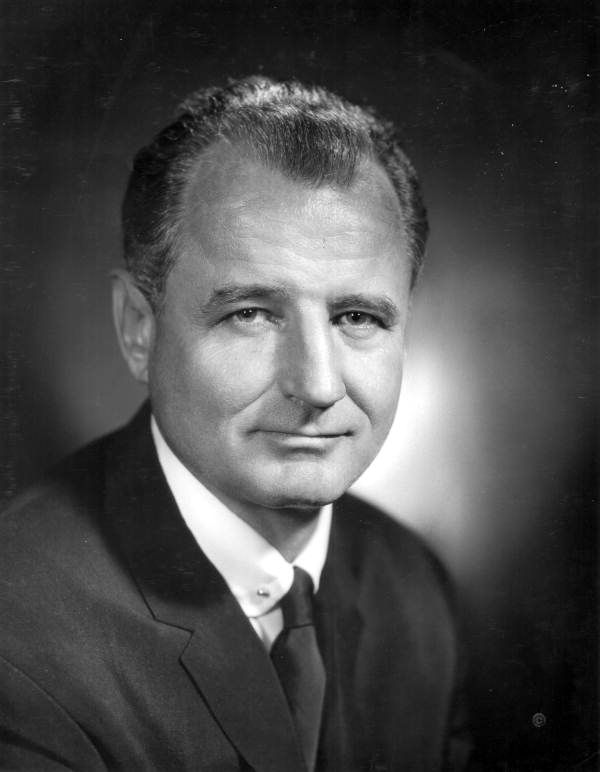
- Smathers, c. 1964

Chair of the Senate Small Business Committee
- In office January 3, 1967 – January 3, 1969
- Preceded by: John Sparkman
- Succeeded by: Alan Bible

Chair of the Senate Aging Committee
- In office January 3, 1963 – January 3, 1967
- Preceded by: Patrick V. McNamara
- Succeeded by: Harrison A. Williams

Secretary of the Senate Democratic Conference
- In office September 13, 1960 – January 3, 1967
- Leader: Lyndon B. Johnson; Mike Mansfield
- Preceded by: Thomas Hennings
- Succeeded by: Robert Byrd

United States Senator from Florida
- In office January 3, 1951 – January 3, 1969
- Preceded by: Claude Pepper
- Succeeded by: Edward Gurney

Member of the U.S. House of Representatives from Florida's 4th district
- In office January 3, 1947 – January 3, 1951
- Preceded by: Pat Cannon
- Succeeded by: Bill Lantaff

Personal details
- Born: George Armistead Smathers; November 14, 1913 Atlantic City, New Jersey, U.S.
- Died: January 20, 2007 (aged 93) Indian Creek, Florida, U.S.
- Resting place: Arlington National Cemetery
- Party: Democratic
- Spouses: Rosemary Townley (m. 1939; div. 1971) Carolyn Hyder (m. 1972)
- Children: 2, including Bruce
- Relatives: William H. Smathers (uncle)
- Education: University of Florida (BA, LLB)

Military service
- Allegiance: United States
- Branch/service: United States Marine Corps
- Years of service: 1942–1945
- Battles/wars: World War II

George Armistead Smathers (November 14, 1913 – January 20, 2007) was an American lawyer and politician from the state of Florida who served in both chambers of the United States Congress, the United States House of Representatives from 1947 to 1951 and the United States Senate from 1951 to 1969. He was a member of the Democratic Party.

== Early life, education and military service ==
Smathers was born on November 13, 1913, in Atlantic City, New Jersey, the son of Lura Frances (Jones) and Benjamin Franklin Smathers. The Smathers Family moved to New Jersey from western North Carolina. Frank Smathers served as a state judge in New Jersey and his brother, William H. Smathers, represented New Jersey in the United States Senate. Frank Smathers moved his family to Miami, Florida, when George Smathers was six in 1920. Smathers would attend Miami Senior High School. While in high school he was an athletic student.

After graduating from high school, Smathers' father convinced him to not accept a football scholarship from the University of Illinois and instead go for the University of Florida as he felt his son had the potential of holding elected office, was not fitted for college football and needed to have connections at the University of Florida for his law firm. At the University of Florida, he would be the captain of both the basketball and track team. He was also academically involved being a member of the Florida Blue Key and managed to become a member of the university's hall of fame in 1936, the same year he graduated. At UF, he was elected as the president of the student body without any opposition. Smathers was inducted into the university's Student Hall of Fame and later into the University of Florida Athletic Hall of Fame in 1991.

After completing his LL.B. in 1939, Smathers married Rosemary Townley from Atlanta and returned to Miami, where he served as Assistant United States Attorney from 1939 to 1942. During World War II, he volunteered for the U.S. Marine Corps and served with Marine Light Bomber Squadron 413 for 19 months in the South Pacific. He survived a crash landing when his light bomber was damaged by enemy fire. Smathers returned to Miami after the war. He would also spend a short period of time prosecuting fraud from the war before running for the United States House of Representatives.

== Political career ==
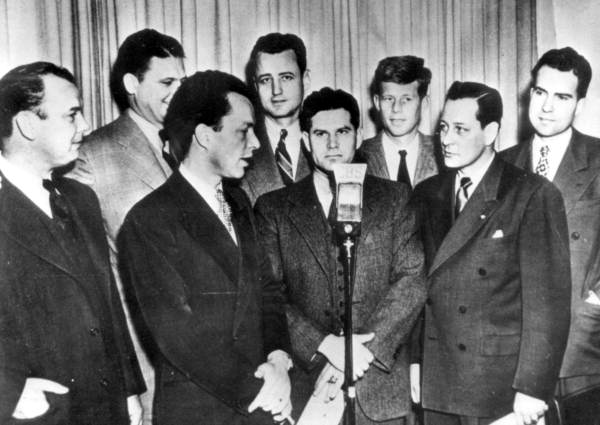
Smathers with John F. Kennedy, Richard Nixon, and other congressional freshmen in 1947

After the war, Smathers was elected to serve two terms in the United States House of Representatives, representing Florida's Fourth Congressional District from 1947 to 1951. He established a reputation for being a moderate except for his anti-communism.

=== House of Representatives ===
In 1946, Smathers defeated four-term incumbent Congressman Pat Cannon by a margin of over two-to-one. Smathers served two terms in the United States House of Representatives, representing Florida's Fourth Congressional District from 1947 to 1951. He established a reputation as a southern liberal and a rising Democratic leader. He was best known for his strong support for President Truman and the Truman Doctrine to contain Soviet and Communist aggression. He fought to make Miami a gateway to Latin American commerce and cultural exchange. Congressman Smathers sponsored legislation to create the Florida Everglades National Park and supported the 24th Constitutional Amendment outlawing the poll tax in federal elections.

=== 1950 Senate Democratic primary ===
Congressman Smathers' district included the "Winter White House" of President Harry Truman in Key West, Florida. Smathers was invited by Truman to fly with him from Washington to Key West, establishing a key relationship with President Truman and members of his Cabinet. In 1949, President Truman called Smathers into a meeting at the White House and said: "I want you to do me a favor. I want you to beat that son-of-a-bitch Claude Pepper." Senator Pepper had been a strong critic of President Truman and the Truman Doctrine and had taken a prominent and visible role in the unsuccessful effort to "dump Truman" in the weeks leading up to the 1948 Democratic National Convention.

Senator Pepper was a strong supporter of Franklin Roosevelt and the New Deal and recognized as a leading southern liberal. As one of the most effective orators of his era, Pepper was considered unbeatable by most Florida observers. In attempting to become a national figure, though, Senator Pepper promoted an internationalist platform of post-war, peaceful cooperation with the Soviet Union. In his praise for Joseph Stalin, the Red Army, and the Soviet Union, Pepper developed one of the most vulnerable records in Congress. Those positions, as well as his advocacy for sharing nuclear weapons technology with the Soviets, lost him the support of Florida's and the nation's press.

Smathers' campaign attacked Pepper on his vulnerable international record, his support for universal health care and his changing stands on the Fair Employment Practice Committee. He charged that Pepper was out-of-touch with his Florida constituency and his positions contrary to national interests. Smathers defeated Pepper in the Democratic primary by over 63,000 votes and won handily in the November general election.

==== Significance of 1950 election ====
While earlier interpretations stressed anti-communism, race-baiting and red-baiting as the dominant reasons for Pepper's defeat, more recent scholarship has focused on Pepper's vulnerable voting record. Historians also contrasted the two candidates' campaign styles as a factor in the outcome. Finally, Smathers was the first candidate from south Florida to be popularly elected as United States Senator breaking the political monopoly of north and central Florida on the highest statewide offices. His victory marked the emergence of southeast Florida's significant economic and political power. For the first time in Florida history an incumbent United States Senator went down to defeat. Pepper's loss also broke the Florida tradition dating to 1845 of always electing one United States Senator from north Florida.

=== Stand on civil rights ===
The civil rights movement dominated southern politics during Smathers' time in Congress. Smathers publicly opposed federal intervention in racial matters except to support voting rights. He also stressed the rule of law and the need for southern states to comply with any federal legislation. Privately, Smathers rejected many of the doctrines and tenets of white supremacy and believed that, over time, whites would change their views on race relations. Smathers, though, fell into line with other southern senators by signing the 1956 Southern Manifesto, an attack on the Supreme Court's 1954 Brown v. Board of Education decision. The signatories accused the Supreme Court of a "clear abuse of judicial power" and promised to use "all lawful means to bring about a reversal of this decision which is contrary to the Constitution and to prevent the use of force in its implementation". As Johnson's lieutenant in the Senate, he helped craft the Senate version of the Civil Rights Act of 1957. He publicly predicted the defeat of the southern filibuster of the bill and voted for its passage in the Senate. The bill was then referred to a conference committee and Smathers voted against the final version. After the chaos surrounding James Meredith's entry into the University of Mississippi in 1962, Smathers wrote: "Federal law must be obeyed ... so that force does not have to be used to bring compliance."

Smather's contradictory positions on racial matters as a private individual and a Florida senator responsive to his conservative state were never more evident than after Johnson became president. Smathers urged Johnson to act quickly to pass national civil rights legislation, stating: "Now that you're the President, I should think they would agree that the sooner we get a civil rights bill over with ... the better the South would be, the better the North would be, the better everybody would be." Smathers privately strategized with Johnson on the passage of the 1964 Civil Rights Act telling Johnson: "I hope that he [Senate Majority Leader Mike Mansfield] has done his counting and that he has the votes."

Yet, as a Florida senator, when the bill came before the Senate, he voted against it. Likewise, Smathers supported federal involvement in upholding voting rights, believing that through the ballot African Americans would gain a seat at the table at all levels of local, state and federal government. In his words, "franchise and freedom are inseparable in America". However, while publicly praising the objectives of the Voting Rights Act of 1965, he opposed the Senate version of the bill. Nonetheless, he supported the final, amended voting rights measures, which enforced the voting rights provisions of the 14th and 15th Amendment to the U.S. Constitution, while outlawing all literacy tests.

=== Senate leadership ===
Smathers' legislative abilities quickly attracted the attention of Senate Majority Leader Lyndon B. Johnson, who brought Smathers into his inner circle as Secretary of the Senate Caucus, the third most powerful position in the party caucus. When Johnson suffered a heart attack in 1956, Smathers became acting Senate majority leader during Johnson's hospitalization. Smathers rejected Johnson's request to later become whip and recommended Mike Mansfield instead. Smathers' refusal to become Johnson's whip precluded Smathers from becoming majority leader when Johnson became vice president in 1961. Smathers retained his position and influence as Secretary of the Democratic Caucus under Majority Leader Mike Mansfield in the sixties. No other Floridian has ever risen as high in either the Democratic or Republican Senate caucuses. Smathers also served as chairman of the important Democratic Senatorial Campaign Committee for six years.

Smathers helped pass bills to create Medicare and Medicaid, the Clean Air Act, sponsored the creation of the Small Business Administration and the Senate Select Committee on Aging, and was the Senate sponsor of the Kerr-Smathers Individual Retirement Accounts (IRAs). He steered critical reforms of the Transportation and Immigration acts and legislation moving federal holidays to Mondays, essentially creating the modern three-day weekend.

=== "Senator From Latin America" ===
Senator Smathers was an early and longstanding advocate for aid to the countries of Latin America. Smathers continually urged vital improvements in sanitation and infrastructure as well as increased trade and economic aid to modernize Latin American economies. Smathers recommended a joint OAS (Organization of American States) military force that would replace individual national armies to maintain the peace and fight communism. For his leadership on Latin America, his Senate colleagues dubbed Smathers "The Senator From Latin America".

In February 1960 he was dispatched alongside William D. Pawley to the Dominican Republic in order to convince the Dominican Republic dictator, Rafael Trujillo, to step down. Trujillo refused.

=== Cuban Revolution ===
Smathers had a chance encounter with Fidel Castro in April 1948. Smathers was attending the Pan-American Conference in Bogota, Colombia, and Castro was participating in the opposition Pan-American Students Conference. Smathers would later claim that Castro admitted to Communist leanings at their encounter. As such, Smathers became an early opponent against Fidel Castro and an early advocate of an economic and arms embargo of Cuba.

Smathers described the Bay of Pigs fiasco as "an ill-conceived, ill-planned deal" that lacked the planning and firepower to succeed. He was the only Senator with John F. Kennedy the night the President announced the U.S. Naval embargo of Cuba during the Missile Crisis of October 1962 – the historic moment when the global superpowers came closest to nuclear war. Senator Smathers amended the Immigration Act to provide permanent visas for Cubans fleeing Communist Cuba, as well as efforts to provide federal assistance in food, education, housing and work for Cuban refugees. He worked closely with the Catholic Welfare Bureau and State Department officials to support Operation Pedro Pan which brought over 14,000 Cuban children to America.

=== Alliance for Progress ===
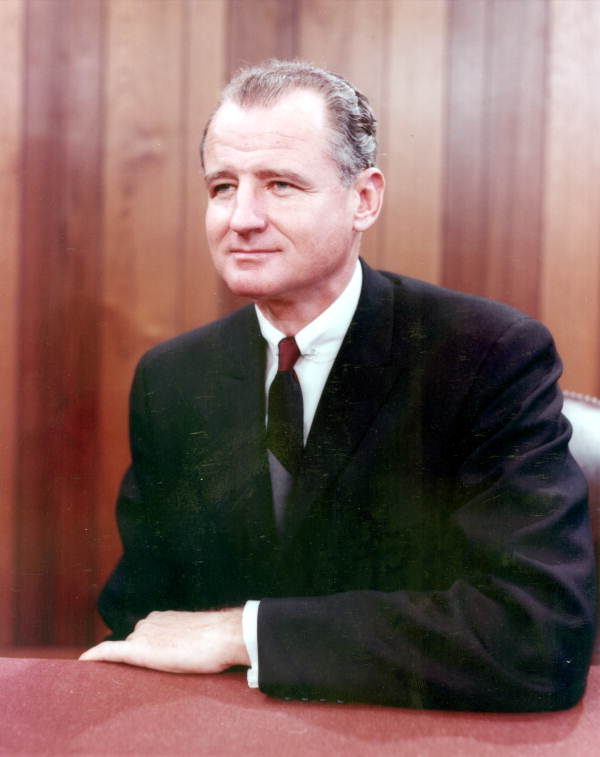
Smathers in 1963

Smathers received partial credit for much of Kennedy's Alliance for Progress which incorporated Smathers recommendations of the need for the U.S to aid Latin America in sanitation, infrastructure, education, increased trade and economic assistance, including the Inter-American Bank which Smathers helped pass. President Kennedy lauded Smathers for being "one of the first Americans to recognize the importance of Latin America".

=== Relationship with John F. Kennedy ===
Both Smathers and Kennedy entered Congress the same year. They became fast friends, which lasted until Kennedy's assassination. At the wedding of Kennedy and Jacqueline Bouvier, Smathers was chosen by the Kennedys to speak on behalf of Jack Kennedy at his wedding rehearsal dinner. In 1960, Kennedy asked Smathers to deliver his nominating speech to the Democratic Convention and to manage the Kennedy-Johnson campaign in the South. Nixon would later say that Smathers was one of Kennedy's few close friends in politics.

=== Presidential politics ===
In 1960, to keep the Florida Democratic Party united, Smathers agreed to run as a "Favorite Son". Winning the Democratic Presidential Primary, Smathers became the first Floridian popularly elected to represent Florida as a presidential candidate at a national convention. In 1968, Floridians again nominated Smathers as their Favorite Son candidate for president.

== Career after Congress ==
After leaving the Senate in 1969, Smathers was divorced from his first wife and married Carolyn Hyder. He achieved considerable success as a lobbyist and businessman. Smathers lived in Indian Creek, Florida and was father to two sons, John (born 1941) and Bruce Smathers (born 1943) (Florida State Senate 1973–1975 and Secretary of State 1975–1978) from his marriage to Rosemary Townley.

In 1988, Smathers donated property appraised at $2 million to renovate the University of Florida's original library building, now Smathers Library. He also made a testamentary gift, valued at the time at $20 million, to the University of Florida and the university honored him by naming the George A. Smathers Libraries. He also donated property valued at $10 million to the University of Miami.

Smathers often attended "Church by the Sea", the United Church of Christ in Bal Harbour, Florida.

== Death and burial ==
His funeral was held there in 2007 after his death in Indian Creek at age 93. At the time of his death, he was the last living former U.S. representative who assumed office in the 1940s and the last living former U.S. senator who assumed office in the 1950s, as well as the last living former U.S. senator who served during the Presidency of Harry S. Truman. Smathers was interred at Arlington National Cemetery.

=== Relationships ===
In addition to his relationships with Kennedy and Johnson, Smathers was also close to Richard Nixon, who was also elected to the House in 1946. Smathers introduced Nixon to "Bebe" Rebozo, who became Nixon's close friend and longtime companion. Smathers sold Nixon his Key Biscayne home which became famous as Nixon's "Florida White House". Smathers was a childhood friend of Phil Graham, a fellow Floridian and half-brother to Bob Graham, Governor of Florida (1979–1987) and United States Senate member (1987–2005). Phil Graham would later become the publisher of The Washington Post. Bill Nelson, U.S. Senate member from Florida from 2001 to 2019, was a summer intern in Smathers's office in 1961–1962 and remained close to the Smathers family throughout his career.

== In popular culture ==
- Smathers Beach, a popular Key West destination, is named after the senator.
- The handsome politician was known by some of his detractors as "Gorgeous George" (after the famous professional wrestler who appeared under that moniker).
- Part of American political lore is the Smathers "redneck speech", which Smathers reportedly delivered to a poorly educated audience. The comments were recorded in a small magazine, picked up in Time and elsewhere, and etched into the public's memories. Time, during the campaign, reported a "yarn" that Smathers had said: "Are you aware that Claude Pepper is known all over Washington as a shameless extrovert? Not only that, but this man is reliably reported to practice nepotism with his sister-in-law, he has a brother who is a known homo sapiens, and he has a sister who was once a thespian in wicked New York. Worst of all, it is an established fact that Mr. Pepper, before his marriage, habitually practiced celibacy." The leading reporter who actually covered Smathers said he always gave the same humdrum speech. No Florida newspapers covering the campaign ever reported such remarks contemporaneously. Smathers offered $10,000 to anyone who could prove he said it, and there were no takers before his death.
- Smathers appeared on The Ed Sullivan Show, was a panelist on What's My Line?, and was frequently a guest on Larry King Live and other news programs.
- In Bryce Zabel's Surrounded By Enemies: What If Kennedy Survived Dallas, Smathers is mentioned as a possible vice presidential candidate for President John F. Kennedy in the 1964 presidential election.

== See also ==
- Florida Gators
- List of Levin College of Law graduates
- List of Sigma Alpha Epsilon members
- List of University of Florida alumni
- List of University of Florida Athletic Hall of Fame members

== Bibliography ==
- Crispell, Brian Lewis, Testing the Limits: George Armistead Smathers and Cold War America, University of Georgia Press, Athens, Georgia (1999). ISBN 0-8203-2103-6.

U.S. House of Representatives
Preceded by Pat Cannon	Member of the U.S. House of Representatives from Florida's 4th congressional district 1947–1951	Succeeded by Bill Lantaff
Party political offices
Preceded by Claude Pepper	Democratic nominee for U.S. Senator from Florida (Class 3); 1950, 1956, 1962	Succeeded by LeRoy Collins
Preceded by Thomas Hennings	Secretary of Senate Democratic Conference; 1960–1967	Succeeded by Robert Byrd
U.S. Senate
Preceded by Claude Pepper	U.S. Senator (Class 3) from Florida; 1951–1969; Served alongside: Spessard Holland	Succeeded by Edward Gurney
Preceded by Patrick V. McNamara	Chair of the Senate Aging Committee; 1963–1967	Succeeded by Harrison A. Williams
Preceded by John Sparkman	Chair of the Senate Small Business Committee; 1967–1969	Succeeded by Alan Bible
Honorary titles
Preceded by Russell B. Long	Most senior living U.S. senator (Sitting or former); 2003–2007	Succeeded by Robert Byrd
Preceded by Edwin Arthur Hall	Most senior living U.S. representative (Sitting or former); 2004–2007	Succeeded by Melvin Laird
