= Joseph Smothers =

Baptist minister

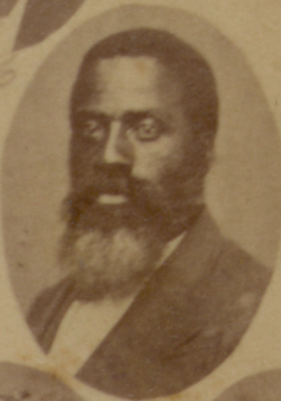

Joseph Smothers was a Baptist minister and state legislator in Mississippi. He represented Claiborne County in the Mississippi House of Representatives from 1872 to 1875.

He was born in Kentucky. He lived in Port Gibson, Mississippi.

== See also ==
- African American officeholders from the end of the Civil War until before 1900
